= Athletics at the 2019 European Games – Men's high jump =

Sports event

Men's high jump at the 2019 European Games
- Venue: Dinamo Stadium, Minsk
- Date: 23 June 2019
- Competitors: 24 from 24 nations
- Winning high: 2.27

Medalists
gold medal	Maksim Nedasekau	Belarus
silver medal	Ilya Ivanyuk	Russia
bronze medal	Bohdan Bondarenko	Ukraine

The men's high jump event at the 2019 European Games in Minsk took place on 23 June. The winners in this discipline were determined during the qualifications for Dynamic New Athletics.

== Results ==
Rank	Match	Athlete	Nation	Result	Notes
1st place, gold medalist(s)	3	Maksim Nedasekau	Belarus	2.27	
2nd place, silver medalist(s)	2	Ilya Ivanyuk	Russia	2.26	
3rd place, bronze medalist(s)	4	Bohdan Bondarenko	Ukraine	2.21	
4	2	Mihai Donisan	Romania	2.18	
5	3	Andrijus Glebauskas	Lithuania	2.14	
6	1	Dimitrios Chondrokoukis	Cyprus	2.13	PB
7	4	Paulo Conceição	Portugal	2.13	
8	1	Falk Wendrich	Germany	2.11	
9	2	Karl Lumi	Estonia	2.11	
10	1	Péter Bakosi	Hungary	2.11	
11	2	William Aubatin	France	2.10	
12	4	Alexis Sastre	Spain	2.10	
13	1	Antonios Merlos	Greece	2.09	
14	1	Roman Sieber	Switzerland	2.08	
15	1	Lukáš Beer	Slovakia	2.08	
16	3	Martin Heindl	Czech Republic	2.08	
17	3	Rihards Bremze	Latvia	2.04	
18	3	Nelvin Appiah	Ireland	2.02	
19	2	Nicolas De Luca	Italy	2.00	
20	4	Simon Hansen	Denmark	1.94	PB
21	2	Axel Luxa	Slovenia	1.90	
21	3	Karol Hoffmann	Poland	1.90	PB
	4	Tihomir Ivanov	Bulgaria	NM	
	4	Alperen Acet	Turkey	NM	
