= 2023 European Athletics Indoor Championships – Men's high jump =

Men's high jump at the 2023 European Athletics Indoor Championships
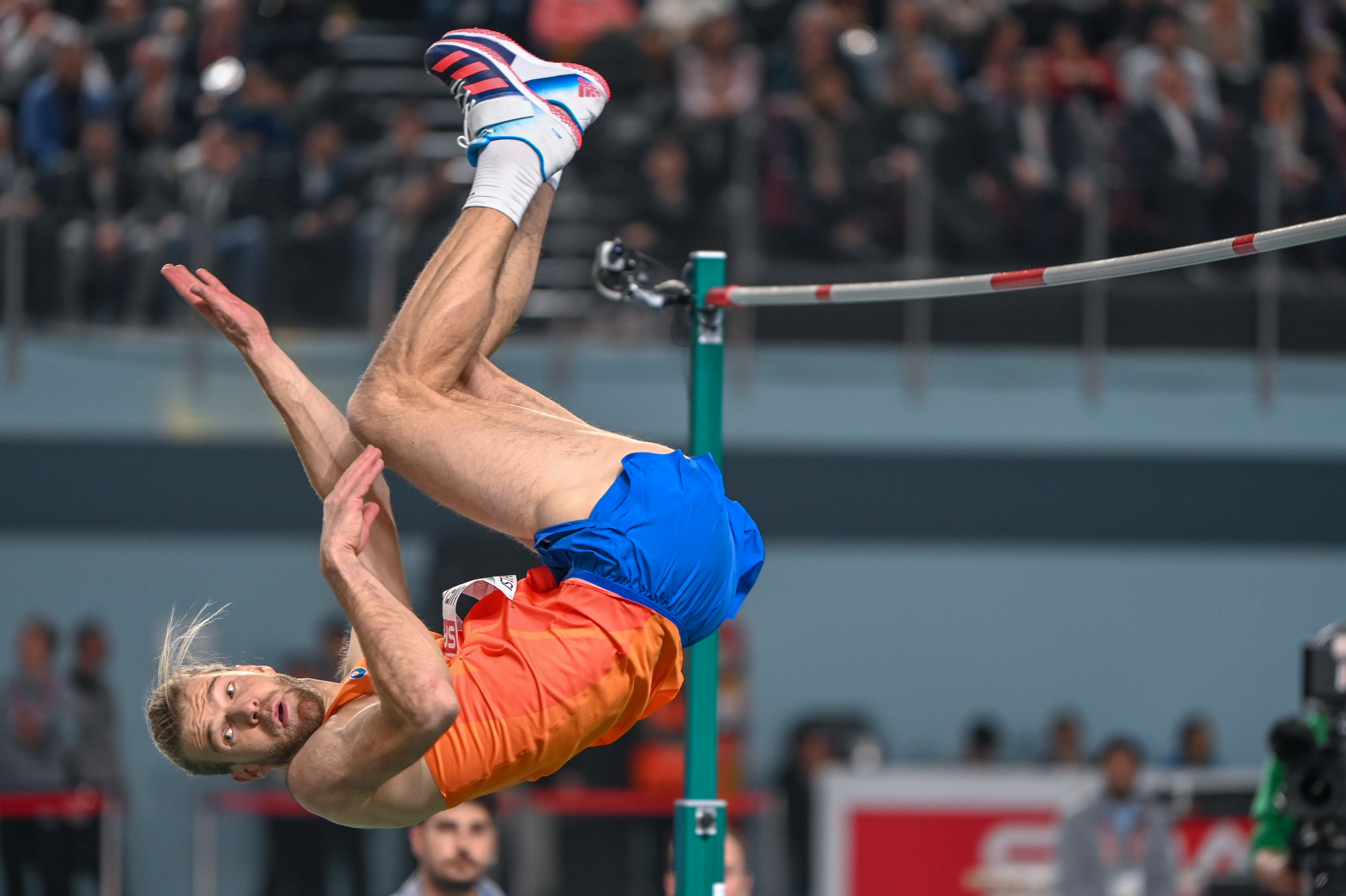
- Gold medal winner, Douwe Amels, in action
- Venue: Ataköy Athletics Arena
- Location: Istanbul, Turkey
- Dates: 3 March 2023 (qualification); 5 March 2023 (final)
- Competitors: 17 from 13 nations
- Winning mark: 2.31 m =NR

Medalists
gold medal	Douwe Amels	Netherlands
silver medal	Andriy Protsenko	Ukraine
bronze medal	Thomas Carmoy	Belgium

The men's high jump event at the 2023 European Athletics Indoor Championships was held on 3 March at 19:00 (qualification) and 5 March at 19:05 (final) local time.

== Records ==
Standing records prior to the 2023 European Athletics Indoor Championships
World record	Javier Sotomayor (CUB)	2.43	Budapest, Hungary	4 March 1989
European record	Carlo Thränhardt (FRG)	2.42	Berlin, West Germany	26 February 1988
Championship record	Stefan Holm (SWE)	2.40	Madrid, Spain	6 March 2005
World Leading	Danil Lysenko (RUS)	2.38	Moscow, Russia	29 January 2023
European Leading	Danil Lysenko (RUS)	2.38	Moscow, Russia	29 January 2023

== Results ==
=== Qualification ===
Qualification: Qualifying performance 2.26 (Q) or at least 8 best performers (q) advance to the Final.

Rank	Athlete	Nationality	2.08	2.14	2.19	2.23	2.26	Result	Note
1	Douwe Amels	Netherlands	–	o	o			2.19	q
1	Thomas Carmoy	Belgium	o	o	o			2.19	q
1	Norbert Kobielski	Poland	o	o	o			2.19	q
1	Andriy Protsenko	Ukraine	o	o	o			2.19	q
5	Christian Falocchi	Italy	o	o	xxo			2.19	q
5	Marco Fassinotti	Italy	o	o	xxo			2.19	q
5	Loïc Gasch	Switzerland	o	o	xxo			2.19	q
5	Tobias Potye	Germany	o	o	xxo			2.19	q
9	Péter Bakosi	Hungary	o	o	xxx			2.14	
9	Gerson Baldé	Portugal	o	o	xxx			2.14	
9	Tihomir Ivanov	Bulgaria	o	o	xxx			2.14	
9	Enes Talha Şenses	Turkey	o	o	xxx			2.14	
13	Antonios Merlos	Greece	xo	o	xxx			2.14	
14	Vadym Kravchuk	Ukraine	xo	xo	xxx			2.14	
14	Jonas Wagner	Germany	xo	xo	xxx			2.14	
16	Juozas Baikštys	Lithuania	o	xxo	xxx			2.14	SB
17	Stefano Sottile	Italy	o	xxx				2.08	

=== Final ===
Rank	Athlete	Nationality	2.10	2.15	2.19	2.23	2.26	2.29	2.31	2.33	2.35	Result	Note
1st place, gold medalist(s)	Douwe Amels	Netherlands	–	o	o	xo	xo	xxo	xo	xr		2.31	=NR
2nd place, silver medalist(s)	Andriy Protsenko	Ukraine	o	o	o	o	xo	o	xx-	x		2.29	
3rd place, bronze medalist(s)	Thomas Carmoy	Belgium	xo	o	o	o	o	xxo	xxx			2.29	PB
4	Tobias Potye	Germany	–	xo	o	xo	o	xx-	x			2.26	
5	Norbert Kobielski	Poland	o	o	o	xo	xo	xxx				2.26	PB
6	Christian Falocchi	Italy	xo	xo	xxo	xxx						2.19	
7	Loïc Gasch	Switzerland	o	xo	xxx							2.15	
8	Marco Fassinotti	Italy	xo	xxo	xxx							2.15	
