= 2022 European Athletics Championships – Men's high jump =

Men's high jump at the 2022 European Athletics Championships
- Venue: Olympiastadion
- Location: Munich
- Dates: 16 August (qualification); 18 August (final)
- Competitors: 24 from 15 nations
- Winning height: 2.30

Medalists
gold medal	Gianmarco Tamberi	Italy
silver medal	Tobias Potye	Germany
bronze medal	Andriy Protsenko	Ukraine

The men's high jump at the 2022 European Athletics Championships takes place at the Olympiastadion on 16 and 18 August.

== Records ==
Standing records prior to the 2022 European Athletics Championships
World record	Javier Sotomayor (CUB)	2.45 m	Salamanca, Spain	27 July 1993
European record	Patrik Sjöberg (SWE)	2.42 m	Stockholm, Sweden	30 June 1987
European record	Bohdan Bondarenko (UKR)	2.42 m	New York, United States	14 June 2014
Championship record	Andrey Silnov (RUS)	2.36 m	Gothenburg, Sweden	9 August 2006
World Leading	Mutaz Essa Barshim (QAT)	2.37 m	Eugene, United States	18 July 2022
Europe Leading	Ilya Ivanyuk (ANA)	2.34 m	Moscow, Russia	7 June 2022

== Schedule ==
Date	Time	Round
16 August 2022	18:35	Qualification
18 August 2022	20:50	Final

All times are local times (UTC+2)

== Results ==
=== Qualification ===
Qualification: 2.28 m (Q) or best 12 performances (q)

Rank	Group	Name	Nationality	2.12	2.17	2.21	Result	Notes
1	B	Thomas Carmoy	Belgium	o	o	o	2.21	q
1	B	Marco Fassinotti	Italy	o	o	o	2.21	q
1	B	Tihomir Ivanov	Bulgaria	o	o	o	2.21	q, =SB
1	A	Tobias Potye	Germany	o	o	o	2.21	q
5	A	Douwe Amels	Netherlands	o	xo	o	2.21	q
5	B	Jonas Wagner	Germany	o	xo	o	2.21	q
7	A	Mateusz Przybylko	Germany	o	xxo	o	2.21	q
8	A	Andriy Protsenko	Ukraine	o	o	xo	2.21	q
8	B	Gianmarco Tamberi	Italy	–	o	xo	2.21	q
10	A	Oleh Doroshchuk	Ukraine	o	o	xxo	2.21	q
10	A	Sébastien Micheau	France	o	o	xxo	2.21	q
10	B	Jan Štefela	Czech Republic	o	o	xxo	2.21	q
13	B	Joel Clarke-Khan	Great Britain	o	xo	xxo	2.21	q
14	A	Juozas Baikštys	Lithuania	o	o	xxx	2.17	
14	B	Bohdan Bondarenko	Ukraine	o	o	xxx	2.17	
14	B	Yonathan Kapitolnik	Israel	o	o	xxx	2.17	
14	B	Antonios Merlos	Greece	o	o	xxx	2.17	
18	A	David Smith	Great Britain	xxo	xo	xxx	2.17	
19	A	Péter Bakosi	Hungary	o	xxx		2.12	
19	A	Gerson Baldé	Portugal	o	xxx		2.12	
21	A	Josef Adámek	Czech Republic	xo	xxx		2.12	
21	A	Christian Falocchi	Italy	xo	xxx		2.12	
23	B	Enes Talha Şenses	Turkey	xxo	xxx		2.12	
	B	Nathan Ismar	France	xxx			NM	

=== Final ===
Rank	Name	Nationality	2.18	2.23	2.27	2.30	2.32	2.33	Result	Notes
1st place, gold medalist(s)	Gianmarco Tamberi	Italy	o	o	o	xo	x-	xx	2.30	
2nd place, silver medalist(s)	Tobias Potye	Germany	o	o	o	xxx			2.27	
3rd place, bronze medalist(s)	Andriy Protsenko	Ukraine	o	xxo	o	xx-	x		2.27	
4	Oleh Doroshchuk	Ukraine	o	o	xx-	x			2.23	
5	Thomas Carmoy	Belgium	o	xo	xxx				2.23	
6	Mateusz Przybylko	Germany	o	xxo	xxx				2.23	
7	Jan Štefela	Czech Republic	o	xxx					2.18	
8	Tihomir Ivanov	Bulgaria	xxo	xxx					2.18	
	Douwe Amels	Netherlands	xxx						NM	
	Joel Clarke-Khan	Great Britain	xxx						NM	
	Marco Fassinotti	Italy	xxx						NM	
	Sébastien Micheau	France	xxx						NM	
	Jonas Wagner	Germany	xxx						NM	
