= 2017 European Athletics Indoor Championships – Men's high jump =

The men's high jump event at the 2017 European Athletics Indoor Championships was held on 4 March at 11:20 (qualification) and 5 March at 16:50 (final) local time.

== Medalists ==
Gold	Silver	Bronze
Sylwester Bednarek; Poland	Robbie Grabarz; Great Britain	Pavel Seliverstau; Belarus

== Records ==
Standing records prior to the 2017 European Athletics Indoor Championships
World record	Javier Sotomayor (CUB)	2.43	Budapest, Hungary	4 March 1989
European record	Carlo Thränhardt (FRG)	2.42	Berlin, West Germany	26 February 1988
Championship record	Stefan Holm (SWE)	2.40	Madrid, Spain	6 March 2005
World Leading	Sylwester Bednarek (POL); Derek Drouin (CAN)	2.33	Banská Bystrica, Slovakia	8 February 2017
European Leading	Sylwester Bednarek (POL)	2.33	Banská Bystrica, Slovakia	8 February 2017

== Results ==
=== Qualification ===
Rank	Athlete	Nationality	2.10	2.16	2.21	2.25	2.28	Result	Note
1	Silvano Chesani	Italy	o	o	o	o	o	2.28	Q, SB
1	Tihomir Ivanov	Bulgaria	–	o	o	o	o	2.28	Q
3	Pavel Seliverstau	Belarus	–	o	o	xo	o	2.28	Q
4	Sylwester Bednarek	Poland	–	o	o	xxo	o	2.28	Q
5	Matúš Bubeník	Slovakia	o	o	o	o	xo	2.28	Q, SB
6	Mateusz Przybylko	Germany	o	o	o	xo	xo	2.28	Q
7	Robert Grabarz	Great Britain	–	–	o	o	xxx	2.25	q
7	Allan Smith	Great Britain	–	o	o	o	xxx	2.25	q
9	Vasilios Constantinou	Cyprus	–	o	xo	o	xxx	2.25	
10	Chris Kandu	Great Britain	o	o	xxo	xxo	xxx	2.25	
11	Lukáš Beer	Slovakia	o	o	o	xxx		2.21	
11	Martin Heindl	Czech Republic	–	o	o	xxx		2.21	
13	Christian Falocchi	Italy	xo	xxo	xo	xxx		2.21	
14	Oleksandr Barannikov	Ukraine	o	xo	xxo	xx–	x	2.21	
15	Raivydas Stanys	Lithuania	xo	o	xxx			2.16	
16	Jānis Vanags	Latvia	o	xxx				2.10	
17	Péter Bakosi	Hungary	xo	xxx				2.10	
17	Fabian Delryd	Sweden	xo	xxx				2.10	
	Miguel Ángel Sancho	Spain	xxx					NM	

=== Final ===
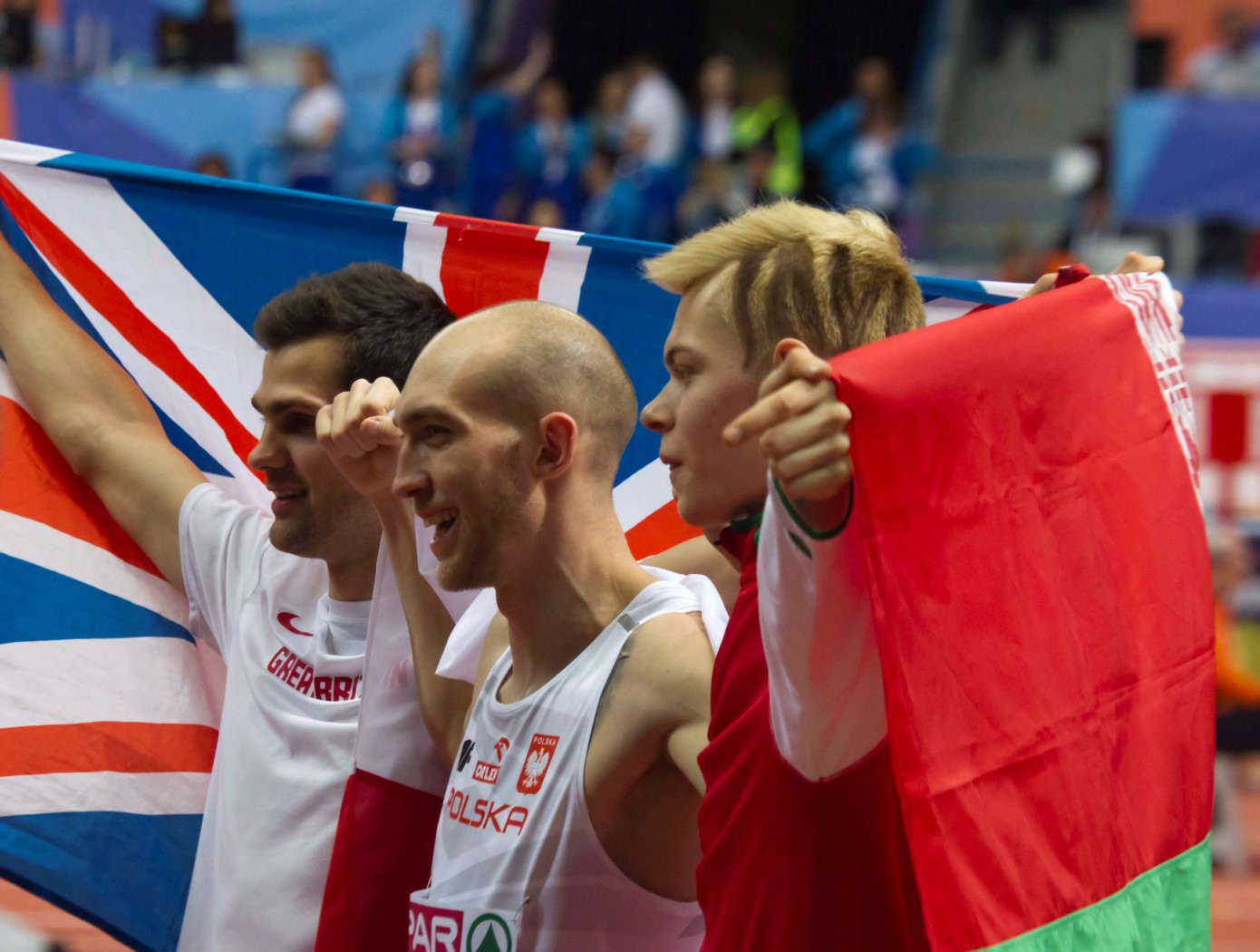
The medallists

Rank	Athlete	Nationality	2.18	2.23	2.27	2.30	2.32	2.34	2.35	Result	Note
1st place, gold medalist(s)	Sylwester Bednarek	Poland	o	o	xxo	xo	o	xx-	x	2.32	
2nd place, silver medalist(s)	Robbie Grabarz	Great Britain	–	o	o	o	x-	xx		2.30	SB
3rd place, bronze medalist(s)	Pavel Seliverstau	Belarus	–	o	o	xxx				2.27	
4	Tihomir Ivanov	Bulgaria	xo	o	o	xxx				2.27	
5	Matúš Bubeník	Slovakia	o	o	xo	xxx				2.27	
6	Silvano Chesani	Italy	o	xo	xo	xxx				2.27	
7	Mateusz Przybylko	Germany	o	xo	xxo	xxx				2.27	
8	Allan Smith	Great Britain	o	xxx						2.18	
