= Daniil Tsyplakov =

Russian high jumper

Personal information
- Native name: Даниил Александрович Цыплаков
- Full name: Daniil Aleksandrovich Tsyplakov
- Nationality: Russia
- Born: 29 July 1992 (age 34) Komsomolsk-on-Amur, Khabarovsk Krai, Russia

Sport
- Country: Russia
- Sport: Athletics
- Event: High jump
- Club: CSKA
- Now coaching: A. Zyplakov, R. Lupatov, P. Harin

Achievements and titles
- Personal bests: 2.33 m 2.34 m (indoors)
Medal record
Men's athletics
Representing Russia
European Indoor Championships
Gold medal – first place	2015 Prague	High jump
Summer Universiade
Gold medal – first place	2015 Gwangju	High jump
World Junior Championships
Bronze medal – third place	2009 Brixen	High jump

Daniil Aleksandrovich Tsyplakov (Russian: Даниил Александрович Цыплаков; born 29 July 1992) is a Russian track and field athlete who competes in the high jump.

== Career ==
Born in Khabarovsk Krai, Tsyplakov's first international medal came at the 2009 World Youth Championships in Athletics, where he cleared a personal best of 2.17 m (7 ft 1 1/4 in) to take the bronze medal. He improved further at the 2009 European Youth Olympics, topping the podium with a jump of 2.21 m (7 ft 3 in). He equalled his best to win the 2010 Russian junior title but had a poor showing at the 2010 World Junior Championships in Athletics, managing only 2.05 m. He jumped a best of 2.26 m (7 ft 4 3/4 in) as the runner-up at the Russian junior championships the following year, but was one place off a medal at the 2011 European Athletics Junior Championships, taking fourth place. The highlight of his 2012 season was a personal best of 2.31 m (7 ft 6 3/4 in) to take sixth place at the Russian Athletics Championships.

Tsyplakov made his first impacts in the senior ranks in the 2013 season. An indoor best of 2.30 m (7 ft 6 1/2 in) brought him third at the Russian Indoor Championships. On the circuit he was second on count-back to Bohdan Bondarenko at the Moscow Challenge and came third at the Athletissima meet with a jump of 2.30 m (7 ft 6 1/2 in). He secured a silver medal in the high jump at the 2013 European Athletics U23 Championships, runner-up to Douwe Amels on count-back, and was third at the Russian Championships later that year.

A performance of 2.34 m (7 ft 8 in) at the 2014 Russian Indoor Championships marked him in second place to Ivan Ukhov and earned him a spot for the 2014 IAAF World Indoor Championships.

== Major competitive record ==
Year	Competition	Venue	Position	Notes
Representing Russia
2009	World Youth Championships	Brixen, Italy	3rd	2.17 m
2009	European Youth Olympics	Tampere, Finland	1st	2.21 m
2010	World Junior Championships	Moncton, Canada	26th (q)	2.05 m
2011	European Junior Championships	Tallinn, Estonia	4th	2.23 m
2013	European U23 Championships	Tampere, Finland	2nd	2.28 m
2014	World Indoor Championships	Sopot, Poland	5th	2.32 m
2014	European Championships	Zürich, Switzerland	5th	2.26 m
2015	European Indoor Championships	Prague, Czech Republic	1st	2.31 m
2015	Universiade	Gwangju, South Korea	1st	2.31 m
2015	World Championships	Beijing, China	5th	2.29 m
