= Przybylko =

Przybylko or Przybyłko is a gender-neutral Polish surname. Notable people with the surname include:

- Kacper Przybyłko (born 1993), Polish footballer
- Mateusz Przybylko (born 1992), German high jumper
