= Dmytro Yakovenko (athlete) =

Ukrainian high jumper (born 1992)

Personal information
- Full name: Dmytro Valeryovych; Yakovenko
- Born: 17 September 1992 (age 33) Ananiv, Ukraine
- Height: 1.92 m (6 ft 4 in)
- Weight: 70 kg (154 lb)

Sport
- Country: Ukraine
- Sport: Athletics
- Event: High jump

Achievements and titles
- Personal best: High jump: 2.30 (2015)
- Updated on 29 August 2015

Dmytro Valeryovych Yakovenko (Ukrainian: Дмитро Валерійович Яковенко; born 17 September 1992) is a Ukrainian high jumper. A member of Ukraine's track and field squad at the 2015 IAAF World Championships and 2016 Summer Olympics, Yakovenko managed to clear his outdoor best jump of 2.30 m at the 2015 Ukraine Team Championships in Kirovohrad.

At the 2016 Summer Olympics in Rio de Janeiro, Yakovenko competed for Ukraine, along with his fellow countrymen Andriy Protsenko and eventual bronze medalist and current European record holder Bohdan Bondarenko, in the men's high jump. Leading up to his maiden Games, Yakovenko jumped a height of 2.30 metres to attain both his personal best and the IAAF Olympic entry standard at the 2015 Ukraine Team Championships. During the qualifying phase, Yakovenko elected to pass 2.17 and 2.22 and then successfully cleared a season best of 2.26 m on his second attempt. Unable to trump the mandatory 2.29-metre barrier after three successive attempts, Yakovenko finished twentieth from a field of 43 high jumpers.

== Competition record ==
Year	Competition	Venue	Position	Notes
Representing Ukraine
2013	European U23 Championships	Tampere, Finland	12th	2.14 m
2015	World Championships	Beijing, China	27th (q)	2.26 m
2016	European Championships	Amsterdam, Netherlands	21st (q)	2.19 m
2016	Olympic Games	Rio de Janeiro, Brazil	20th (q)	2.26 m
