= 2013 European Athletics U23 Championships – Men's high jump =

The Men's high jump event at the 2013 European Athletics U23 Championships was held in Tampere, Finland, at Ratina Stadium on 12 and 14 July.

== Medalists ==
Gold	Douwe Amels; Netherlands
Silver	Daniil Tsyplakov; Russia
Bronze	Adónios Mástoras; Greece
Bronze	Allan Smith; United Kingdom

== Results ==
=== Final ===
14 July 2013

Rank	Name	Nationality	Attempts									Result	Notes
Rank	Name	Nationality	2.05	2.10	2.14	2.18	2.21	2.24	2.26	2.28	2.30	Result	Notes
1st place, gold medalist(s)	Douwe Amels	Netherlands	-	o	o	xo	xxo	xo	o	o	xxx	2.28	PB
2nd place, silver medalist(s)	Daniil Tsyplakov	Russia	-	-	o	o	o	o	o	xxo	xxx	2.28	
3rd place, bronze medalist(s)	Adónios Mástoras	Greece	-	-	o	o	xo	o	o	xxx		2.26	PB
3rd place, bronze medalist(s)	Allan Smith	United Kingdom	-	-	o	o	o	xo	o	xxx		2.26	PB
5	Mateusz Przybylko	Germany	o	o	xo	o	xxo	xo	xxx			2.24	PB
6	Ilya Ivanyuk	Russia	o	o	o	o	o	xxx				2.21	
7	Chris Baker	United Kingdom	o	o	o	xxo	xxo	x-	xx			2.21	
8	Artsem Naumovich	Belarus	o	o	o	o	xxx					2.18	
9	Andrei Churyla	Belarus	o	o	o	xxx						2.14	
9	Alen Melon	Croatia	-	o	o	xxx						2.14	
9	Tanel Reismann	Estonia	o	o	o	xxx						2.14	
12	Dmytro Yakovenko	Ukraine	o	o	xo	xxx						2.14	

=== Qualifications ===
Qualified: qualifying perf. 2.20 (Q) or 12 best performers (q) advance to the Final

==== Summary ====
Rank	Name	Nationality	Result	Notes
1	Adónios Mástoras	Greece	2.20	Q
1	Daniil Tsyplakov	Russia	2.20	Q
3	Douwe Amels	Netherlands	2.20	Q SB
4	Andrei Churyla	Belarus	2.20	Q
4	Ilya Ivanyuk	Russia	2.20	Q
4	Artsem Naumovich	Belarus	2.20	Q
7	Mateusz Przybylko	Germany	2.20	Q
8	Allan Smith	United Kingdom	2.20	Q
9	Chris Baker	United Kingdom	2.20	Q
9	Dmytro Yakovenko	Ukraine	2.20	Q
11	Alen Melon	Croatia	2.20	Q PB
12	Tanel Reismann	Estonia	2.17	q
13	Andriy Kovalyov	Ukraine	2.17	
13	Gianmarco Tamberi	Italy	2.17	
15	Vasilios Konstantinou	Cyprus	2.17	PB
16	Bram Ghuys	Belgium	2.17	PB
16	Ferrante Grasselli	Italy	2.17	
18	Mihai Anastasiu	Romania	2.17	=PB
19	Paulo Conceição	Portugal	2.13	
19	Mikk Meerents	Estonia	2.13	PB
21	Piotr Milewski	Poland	2.13	
22	Şahabettin Karabulut	Turkey	2.13	
23	Péter Bakosi	Hungary	2.09	
23	Martin Heindl	Czech Republic	2.09	
25	Eugenio Rossi	San Marino	2.09	
26	Jānis Vanags	Latvia	2.09	
27	Haris Selimović	Bosnia and Herzegovina	2.09	
28	Tiago Pereira	Portugal	2.05	

==== Details ====
===== Group A =====
12 July 2013 / 10:00

Rank	Name	Nationality	Attempts								Result	Notes
Rank	Name	Nationality	1.90	1.95	2.00	2.05	2.09	2.13	2.17	2.20	Result	Notes
1	Daniil Tsyplakov	Russia	-	-	-	-	-	o	o	o	2.20	Q
2	Andrei Churyla	Belarus	-	-	-	o	o	o	o	xo	2.20	Q
3	Mateusz Przybylko	Germany	-	-	o	xo	o	o	o	xo	2.20	Q
4	Chris Baker	United Kingdom	-	-	-	o	o	o	o	xxo	2.20	Q
4	Dmytro Yakovenko	Ukraine	-	-	o	o	o	o	o	xxo	2.20	Q
6	Tanel Reismann	Estonia	-	-	o	o	o	xo	o	xxx	2.17	q
7	Bram Ghuys	Belgium	-	-	-	o	o	o	xxo	xxx	2.17	PB
7	Ferrante Grasselli	Italy	-	-	o	o	o	o	xxo	xxx	2.17	
9	Mihai Anastasiu	Romania	-	-	-	o	o	xxo	xxo	xxx	2.17	=PB
10	Piotr Milewski	Poland	-	-	o	o	xo	o	xxx		2.13	
11	Şahabettin Karabulut	Turkey	-	-	-	o	o	xo	xxx		2.13	
12	Péter Bakosi	Hungary	-	-	-	o	o	xxx			2.09	
13	Jānis Vanags	Latvia	-	-	-	xo	xo	x-	r		2.09	
14	Tiago Pereira	Portugal	-	-	xxo	xxo	xxx				2.05	

===== Group B =====
12 July 2013 / 10:00

Rank	Name	Nationality	Attempts								Result	Notes
Rank	Name	Nationality	1.90	1.95	2.00	2.05	2.09	2.13	2.17	2.20	Result	Notes
1	Adónios Mástoras	Greece	-	-	-	-	o	o	o	o	2.20	Q
2	Douwe Amels	Netherlands	-	-	-	o	o	xo	o	o	2.20	Q SB
3	Ilya Ivanyuk	Russia	-	-	-	o	o	o	o	xo	2.20	Q
3	Artsem Naumovich	Belarus	-	-	-	o	o	o	o	xo	2.20	Q
5	Allan Smith	United Kingdom	-	-	-	-	o	o	xxo	xo	2.20	Q
6	Alen Melon	Croatia	-	-	-	-	o	o	xo	xxo	2.20	Q PB
7	Andriy Kovalyov	Ukraine	-	-	-	xo	o	o	xo	xxx	2.17	
7	Gianmarco Tamberi	Italy	-	-	-	-	xo	o	xo	xxx	2.17	
9	Vasilios Konstantinou	Cyprus	-	-	xxo	o	xo	xxo	xo	xxx	2.17	PB
10	Paulo Conceição	Portugal	-	-	-	o	o	o	xxx		2.13	
10	Mikk Meerents	Estonia	-	-	o	o	o	o	xxx		2.13	PB
12	Martin Heindl	Czech Republic	o	-	o	o	o	xxx			2.09	
13	Eugenio Rossi	San Marino	-	-	xo	o	o	xxx			2.09	
14	Haris Selimović	Bosnia and Herzegovina	o	o	o	o	xxo	xxx			2.09	

== Participation ==
According to an unofficial count, 28 athletes from 21 countries participated in the event.

- Belarus (2)
- Belgium (1)
- Bosnia and Herzegovina (1)
- Croatia (1)
- Cyprus (1)
- Czech Republic (1)
- Estonia (2)
- Germany (1)
- Greece (1)
- Hungary (1)
- Italy (2)
- Latvia (1)
- Netherlands (1)
- Poland (1)
- Portugal (2)
- Romania (1)
- Russia (2)
- San Marino (1)
- Turkey (1)
- Ukraine (2)
- United Kingdom (2)
