= 2018 European Athletics Championships – Men's high jump =

Men's high jump at the 2018 European Athletics Championships
- Venue: Olympic Stadium
- Location: Berlin
- Dates: August 9 (qualification); August 11 (final)
- Competitors: 28 from 18 nations
- Winning height: 2.35

Medalists
gold medal	Mateusz Przybylko	Germany
silver medal	Maksim Nedasekau	Belarus
bronze medal	Ilya Ivanyuk	Authorised Neutral Athletes

The men's high jump at the 2018 European Athletics Championships took place at the Olympic Stadium on 9 and 11 August.

== Records ==
Standing records prior to the 2018 European Athletics Championships
World record	Javier Sotomayor (CUB)	2.45 m	Salamanca, Spain	27 July 1993
European record	Patrik Sjöberg (SWE)	2.42 m	Stockholm, Sweden	30 June 1987
European record	Bohdan Bondarenko (UKR)	2.42 m	New York City, United States	14 June 2014
Championship record	Andrey Silnov (RUS)	2.36 m	Gothenburg, Sweden	9 August 2006
World Leading	Mutaz Essa Barshim (QAT)	2.40 m	Doha, Qatar	4 May 2018
European Leading	Danil Lysenko (ANA)	2.40 m	Monaco	20 July 2018

== Schedule ==
Date	Time	Round
9 August 2018	19:45	Qualification
11 August 2018	20:00	Final

All times are local times (UTC+2)

== Results ==
=== Qualification ===
Qualification: 2.27 m (Q) or best 12 performances (q)

Rank	Group	Name	Nationality	2.11	2.16	2.21	2.25	Result	Notes
1	B	Maksim Nedasekau	Belarus	–	o	o	o	2.25	q
1	A	Mateusz Przybylko	Germany	o	o	o	o	2.25	q
3	A	Dmytro Dem'yanyuk	Ukraine	–	o	xxo	o	2.25	q
3	B	Andriy Protsenko	Ukraine	o	xo	xo	o	2.25	q
5	B	Eike Onnen	Germany	o	o	o	xo	2.25	q
5	A	Gianmarco Tamberi	Italy	–	o	o	xo	2.25	q
7	B	Alperen Acet	Turkey	o	o	xo	xo	2.25	q
7	B	Ilya Ivanyuk	Authorised Neutral Athletes	o	o	xo	xo	2.25	q
9	A	Sylwester Bednarek	Poland	o	o	xo	xxo	2.25	q
10	A	Douwe Amels	Netherlands	o	o	o	xxx	2.21	q
10	B	Konstadinos Baniotis	Greece	–	o	o	xxx	2.21	q
10	B	Loïc Gasch	Switzerland	o	o	o	xxx	2.21	q
13	B	Marco Fassinotti	Italy	o	o	xo	xxx	2.21	
13	B	Viktor Lonskyy	Ukraine	o	o	xo	xxx	2.21	
15	A	Allan Smith	Great Britain	–	xo	xo	xxx	2.21	
16	B	Chris Baker	Great Britain	o	o	xxo	xxx	2.21	
16	B	Maciej Grynienko	Poland	o	o	xxo	xxx	2.21	
16	A	Dmitry Kroyter	Israel	o	o	xxo	xxx	2.21	
16	A	Tobias Potye	Germany	o	o	xxo	xxx	2.21	
20	B	Lukáš Beer	Slovakia	o	o	xxx		2.16	
20	A	Matúš Bubeník	Slovakia	o	o	xxx		2.16	
20	A	Adrijus Glebauskas	Lithuania	o	o	xxx		2.16	
20	A	Jonas Kløjgaard Jensen	Denmark	o	o	xxx		2.16	
20	A	David Smith	Great Britain	o	o	xxx		2.16	
25	B	Bram Ghuys	Belgium	xo	o	xxx		2.16	
26	B	Vasilios Konstantinou	Cyprus	o	xxx			2.11	
26	A	Andrei Skabeika	Belarus	o	xxx			2.11	
	A	Eugenio Rossi	San Marino	xxx				NM	

=== Final ===
Rank	Name	Nationality	2.19	2.24	2.28	2.31	2.33	2.35	2.37	2.38	Result	Notes
1st place, gold medalist(s)	Mateusz Przybylko	Germany	o	o	o	o	o	o	–	xr	2.35	=PB
2nd place, silver medalist(s)	Maksim Nedasekau	Belarus	o	o	xx–	o	o	xx–	x		2.33	=PB
3rd place, bronze medalist(s)	Ilya Ivanyuk	Authorised Neutral Athletes	o	o	o	o	xxx				2.31	PB
4	Gianmarco Tamberi	Italy	o	xo	o	x–	xx				2.28	SB
5	Alperen Acet	Turkey	o	xo	xxx						2.24	
5	Andriy Protsenko	Ukraine	o	xo	xxx						2.24	
7	Sylwester Bednarek	Poland	o	xxo	xxx						2.24	
8	Douwe Amels	Netherlands	o	xxx							2.19	
8	Eike Onnen	Germany	o	xxx							2.19	
10	Konstadinos Baniotis	Greece	xxo	xxx							2.19	
10	Loïc Gasch	Switzerland	xxo	xxx							2.19	
	Dmytro Dem'yanyuk	Ukraine	xxx								NM	
