= 2015 European Athletics Indoor Championships – Men's high jump =

The men's high jump event at the 2015 European Athletics Indoor Championships was held on 6 March at 16:05 (qualification) and 7 March at 16:30 (final) local time.

== Medalists ==
Gold	Silver	Bronze
Daniil Tsyplakov; Russia	Silvano Chesani; Italy; Antonios Mastoras; Greece	

== Results ==
=== Qualification ===
Qualification: Qualification Performance 2.31 (Q) or at least 8 best performers (q) advanced to the final.

Rank	Athlete	Nationality	2.14	2.19	2.24	2.28	Result	Note
1	Jaroslav Bába	Czech Republic	o	o	o	o	2.28	q
1	Antonios Mastoras	Greece	o	o	o	o	2.28	q
1	Daniil Tsyplakov	Russia	o	o	o	o	2.28	q
4	Silvano Chesani	Italy	o	o	o	xo	2.28	q
5	Gianmarco Tamberi	Italy	o	xo	xxo	xo	2.28	q, SB
6	Aleksandr Shustov	Russia	o	o	o	xxo	2.28	q, =SB
7	Kyriakos Ioannou	Cyprus	xo	o	o	xxo	2.28	q, SB
7	Andriy Protsenko	Ukraine	o	o	xo	xxo	2.28	q
9	Sylwester Bednarek	Poland	o	o	o	xxx	2.24	
9	Matúš Bubeník	Slovakia	o	o	o	xxx	2.24	
9	Mihai Donisan	Romania	o	o	o	xxx	2.24	
12	Konstadinos Baniotis	Greece	o	xo	xo	xxx	2.24	
12	Aleksey Dmitrik	Russia	o	xo	xo	xxx	2.24	
14	Tihomir Ivanov	Bulgaria	o	xo	xxo	xxx	2.24	
14	Yuriy Krymarenko	Ukraine	o	xo	xxo	xxx	2.24	
16	Lukáš Beer	Slovakia	o	o	xxx		2.19	
16	Andrea Lemmi	Italy	o	o	xxx		2.19	
16	Eugenio Rossi	San Marino	o	o	xxx		2.19	
19	Dimitrios Chondrokoukis	Cyprus	o	xo	xxx		2.19	
20	Raivydas Stanys	Lithuania	xo	xo	xxx		2.19	
21	Allan Smith	Great Britain	o	xxo	x–	xx	2.19	
22	Andriy Kovalyov	Ukraine	o	xxx			2.14	
22	Andrei Mîtîcov	Moldova	o	xxx			2.14	
22	Mateusz Przybylko	Germany	o	xxx			2.14	
25	Péter Bakosi	Hungary	xo	xxx			2.14	
25	Miguel Ángel Sancho	Spain	xo	xxx			2.14	
	Michal Kabelka	Slovakia	xxx				NM	

=== Final ===
Rank	Athlete	Nationality	2.19	2.24	2.28	2.31	2.34	Result	Note
1st place, gold medalist(s)	Daniil Tsyplakov	Russia	o	o	xxo	o	xxx	2.31	=SB
2nd place, silver medalist(s)	Silvano Chesani	Italy	o	xxo	xo	xo	xxx	2.31	SB
2nd place, silver medalist(s)	Antonios Mastoras	Greece	xo	o	xxo	xo	xxx	2.31	PB
4	Aleksandr Shustov	Russia	xo	o	o	xxx		2.28	=SB
5	Jaroslav Bába	Czech Republic	o	o	xo	xxx		2.28	
6	Andriy Protsenko	Ukraine	o	xxo	xxo	xx–	x	2.28	
7	Gianmarco Tamberi	Italy	o	xo	xxx			2.24	
	Kyriakos Ioannou	Cyprus	–	xr				NM	
