= Sylwester Bednarek =

Polish high jumper (born 1989)

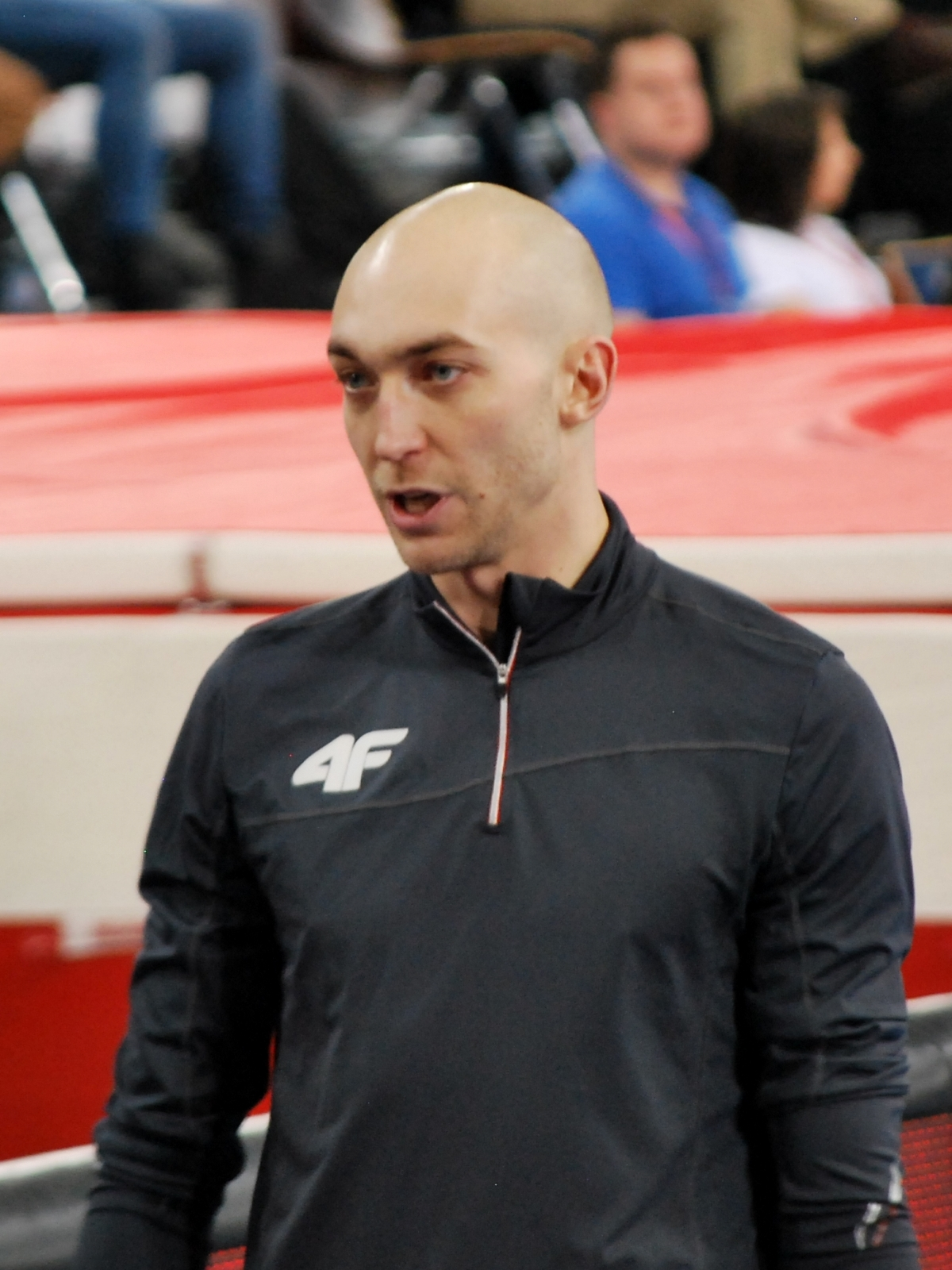
- Bednarek in 2016

Personal information
- Born: 28 April 1989 (age 37) Łódź, Poland
- Height: 1.96 m (6 ft 5 in)

Sport
- Country: Poland
- Sport: Athletics
- Event: High jump
- Club: RKS Łódź
- Coached by: Lech Krakowiak; Michał Lićwinko
Medal record
Men's Athletics
Representing Poland
World Championships
Bronze medal – third place	2009 Berlin	High jump
European Indoor Championships
Gold medal – first place	2017 Belgrade	High jump
World Junior Championships
Silver medal – second place	2008 Bydgoszcz	High jump
European Athletics U23 Championships
Gold medal – first place	2009 Kaunas	High jump

Sylwester Bednarek (Polish pronunciation: [sɨlˈvɛstɛr bɛdˈnarɛk]; born 28 April 1989) is a Polish high jumper. He won the bronze medal at the 2009 World Championships and gold at the 2017 European Indoor Championships.

== Life and career ==
Bednarek was born in Łódź. He finished fourth at the 2005 World Youth Championships and the 2006 World Junior Championships, finished sixth at the 2007 European Junior Championships and won the silver medal at the 2008 World Junior Championships. He also competed at the 2009 European Indoor Championships without reaching the final. He underwent knee surgery due to an injury in 2010 and returned to competition. He was tenth at the 2010 European Athletics Championships but pain persisted in his knee into the 2011 season and he decided to undergo further surgery with an eye on being in his best shape for the 2012 London Olympics. Unfortunately, at the national championships soon before the Games, he ruptured the Achilles tendon in his other leg and only returned to competition in 2013. In 2017, he won the gold medal at the European Indoor Championships in Belgrade.

His personal best jump is 2.32 metres, achieved in August 2009 in Berlin at the World Championships. He has achieved 2.33 metres indoors, a mark set in February 2017 in Banská Bystrica.

For his sport achievements, he received:
Golden Cross of Merit in 2009.

== Competition record ==
Year	Competition	Venue	Position	Notes
Representing Poland
2005	World Youth Championships	Marrakesh, Morocco	4th	2.18 m
2006	World Junior Championships	Beijing, China	4th	2.23 m
2007	European Junior Championships	Hengelo, Netherlands	6th	2.21 m
2008	World Junior Championships	Bydgoszcz, Poland	2nd	2.24 m
2009	European Indoor Championships	Turin, Italy	14th (q)	2.22 m
2009	European U23 Championships	Kaunas, Lithuania	1st	2.28 m
2009	World Championships	Berlin, Germany	3rd	2.32 m
2010	European Championships	Barcelona, Spain	10th	2.19 m
2015	European Indoor Championships	Prague, Czech Republic	9th (q)	2.24 m
2015	Universiade	Gwangju, South Korea	6th	2.20 m
2015	World Championships	Beijing, China	33rd (q)	2.22 m
2016	European Championships	Amsterdam, Netherlands	16th (q)	2.23 m
2016	Olympic Games	Rio de Janeiro, Brazil	30th (q)	2.22 m
2017	European Indoor Championships	Belgrade, Serbia	1st	2.32 m
2017	World Championships	London, United Kingdom	20th (q)	2.26 m
2018	World Indoor Championships	Birmingham, United Kingdom	5th	2.25 m
2018	European Championships	Berlin, Germany	7th	2.24 m
2019	European Indoor Championships	Glasgow, United Kingdom	6th	2.22 m

== Personal bests ==
- Outdoor: 2.32 m (2009)
- Indoor: 2.33 m (2017)
