= Chris Baker (high jumper) =

British high jumper (born 1991)

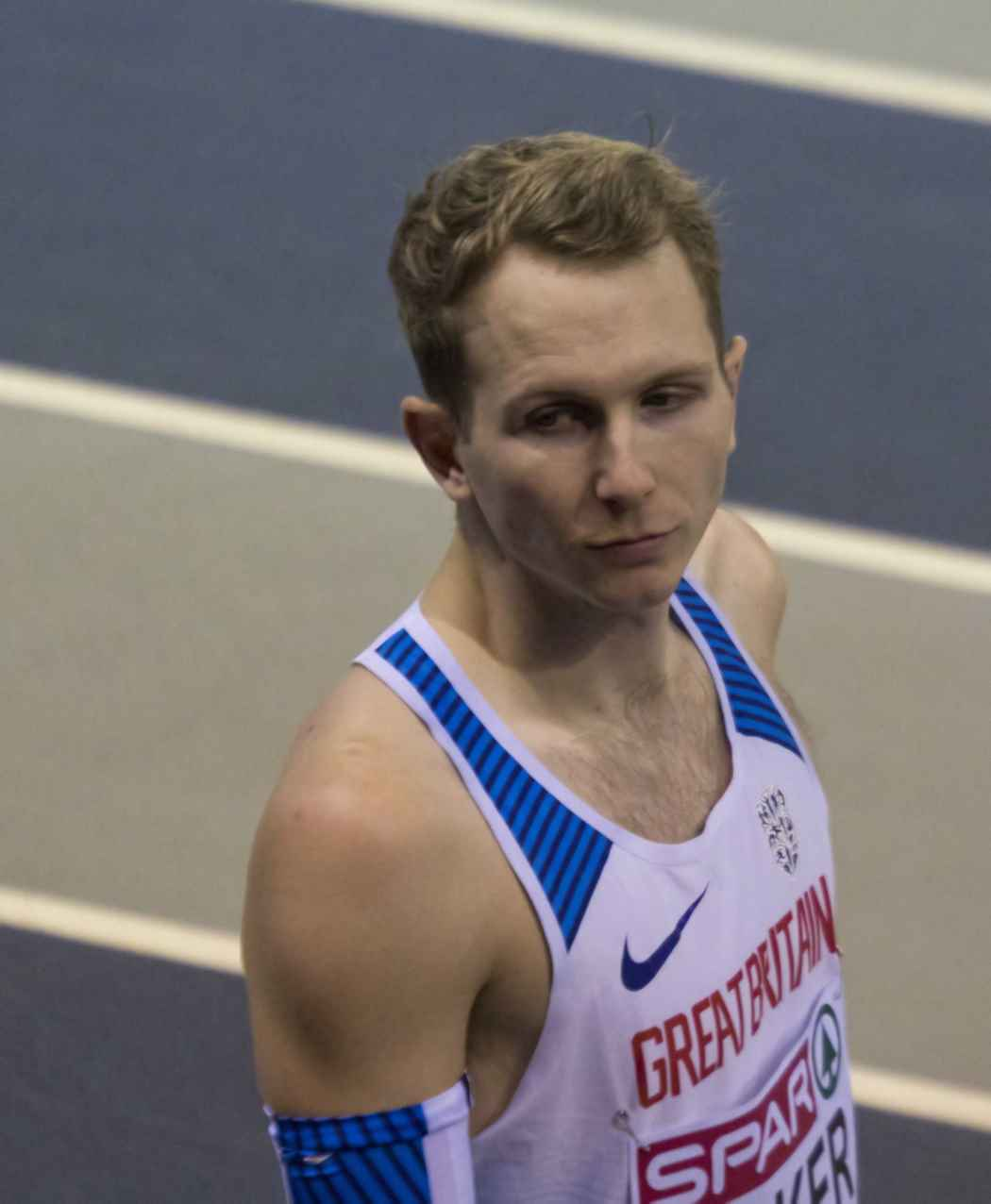
- Baker in 2019

Personal information
- Born: 2 February 1991 (age 35) Norwich, England
- Height: 1.94 m (6 ft 4 1/2 in)
- Weight: 80 kg (180 lb)

Sport
- Sport: Athletics
- Event: High jump
- Club: Sale Harriers
- Coached by: Gareth Walton & Graham Ravenscroft
Medal record
European Championships
| Bronze medal – third place | Amsterdam 2016 | High jump |

Christopher Edwin Baker (born 2 February 1991) is an English athlete specialising in the high jump. He competed at the 2016 Summer Olympics.

== Biography ==
Baker represented England at the 2014 Commonwealth Games in Glasgow and won a bronze medal at the 2016 European Championships. His personal bests in the event are 2.29 metres outdoors (Amsterdam 2016) and 2.36 metres indoors (Hustopece 2016).

At the 2016 Olympic Games in Rio de Janeiro, he represented Great Britain in the high jump event.

Baker became the British high jump champion after winning the 2018 British Athletics Championships. A second Commonwealth Games appearance ensued when he represented England at the 2018 Commonwealth Games in Gold Coast.

== Competition record ==
| Year | Competition | Venue | Position | Notes |
Representing Great Britain and England
| 2008 | Commonwealth Youth Games | Pune, India | 4th | 2.06 m |
| 2013 | European U23 Championships | Tampere, Finland | 7th | 2.21 m |
| 2014 | European Team Championships | Braunschweig, Germany | 5th | 2.19 m |
| 2014 | Commonwealth Games | Glasgow, United Kingdom | 4th | 2.25 m |
| 2014 | European Championships | Zürich, Switzerland | 11th | 2.21 m |
| 2016 | World Indoor Championships | Portland, United States | 8th | 2.29 m |
| 2016 | European Championships | Amsterdam, Netherlands | 3rd | 2.29 m |
| 2016 | Olympic Games | Rio de Janeiro, Brazil | 16th (q) | 2.26 m |
| 2017 | European Team Championships | Lille, France | 8th | 2.12 m |
| 2018 | Commonwealth Games | Gold Coast, Australia | 9th | 2.21 m |
| 2018 | European Championships | Berlin, Germany | 16th (q) | 2.21 m |
| 2019 | European Indoor Championships | Glasgow, United Kingdom | 4th | 2.22 m |
