= Yuji Hiramatsu =

Japanese high jumper

Personal information
- Born: 11 January 1997 (age 29)
- Education: University of Tsukuba
- Height: 1.85 m (6 ft 1 in)
- Weight: 63 kg (139 lb)

Sport
- Sport: Track and field
- Event: High jump
- Updated on 29 August 2015

Yuji Hiramatsu (平松 祐司, Hiramatsu Yūji; born 11 January 1997) is a Japanese high jumper. He competed at the 2015 World Championships in Beijing.

His personal bests in the event are 2.28 metres outdoors (Yokohama 2015) and 2.17 metres indoors (Gothenburg 2015).

== Competition record ==
Year	Competition	Venue	Position	Notes
Representing Japan
2013	Asian Youth Games	Nanjing, China	1st	2.06 m
2014	Youth Olympic Games	Nanjing, China	2nd	2.14 m
2015	Universiade	Gwangju, South Korea	15th (q)	2.10 m
2015	World Championships	Beijing, China	35th (q)	2.17 m
2016	World U20 Championships	Bydgoszcz, Poland	6th	2.21 m
