= Loïc Gasch =

Swiss high jumper (born 1994)

Personal information
- Born: 13 August 1994 (age 31) Sainte-Croix, Switzerland

Sport
- Country: Switzerland
- Sport: Athletics
- Event: High jump
Medal record
Men's track and field
Representing Switzerland
World Indoor Championships
Silver medal – second place	2022 Belgrade	High jump

Loïc Gasch (French pronunciation: [lɔik ɡaʃ]; born 13 August 1994) is a Swiss high jumper.

He finished tenth at the 2018 European Championships. He also competed at the 2015 European U23 Championships without reaching the final.

His personal best jump was 2.26 metres, achieved in July 2017 in Zürich, before he jumped 2.33 m, new Swiss record at Stade olympique de la Pontaise, Lausanne (SUI) on 8 May 2021.

== International competitions ==
Year	Competition	Venue	Position	Result
Representing Switzerland
2011	European Youth Olympic Festival	Trabzon, Turkey	7th	2.00 m
2015	European U23 Championships	Tallinn, Estonia	17th (q)	2.10 m
2018	European Championships	Berlin, Germany	10th	2.19 m
2021	Olympic Games	Tokyo, Japan	23rd (q)	2.21 m
2022	World Indoor Championships	Belgrade, Serbia	2nd	2.31 m
2022	World Championships	Eugene, United States	22nd (q)	2.21 m
2023	European Indoor Championships	Istanbul, Turkey	7th	2.15 m
