= Vasilios Konstantinou =

Cypriot high jumper (born 1992)

Personal information
- Born: 13 September 1992 (age 33) Geneva, Switzerland
- Height: 1.80 m (5 ft 11 in)
- Weight: 63 kg (139 lb)

Sport
- Sport: Athletics
- Event: High jump

Vasilios Konstantinou (Greek: Βασίλειος Κωνσταντίνου; born 13 September 1992) is a Cypriot athlete specialising in the high jump. He has won several Games of the Small States of Europe titles.

His personal bests in the event are 2.28 metres outdoors (Kavala, Greece 2017) and 2.28 metres indoors (Hustopece, Czech Republic 2016).

== International competitions ==
Year	Competition	Venue	Position	Notes
Representing Cyprus
2009	World Youth Championships	Brixen, Italy	15th (q)	2.07 m
2009	European Youth Olympic Festival	Tampere, Finland	7th	2.04 m
2010	World Junior Championships	Moncton, Canada	27th (q)	2.05 m
2013	Games of the Small States of Europe	Luxembourg, Luxembourg	1st	2.12 m
2013	European U23 Championships	Tampere, Finland	15th (q)	2.17 m
2014	Mediterranean U23 Championships	Aubagne, France	1st	2.18 m
2014	Commonwealth Games	Glasgow, United Kingdom	17th (q)	2.11 m
2015	Games of the Small States of Europe	Reykjavík, Iceland	1st	2.18 m
2016	Championships of the Small States of Europe	Marsa, Malta	1st	2.16 m
2016	European Championships	Amsterdam, Netherlands	9th	2.24 m
2017	European Indoor Championships	Belgrade, Serbia	9th (q)	2.25 m
2017	Games of the Small States of Europe	Serravalle, San Marino	1st	2.21 m
2018	Balkan Indoor Championships	Istanbul, Turkey	2nd	2.18 m
2018	Commonwealth Games	Gold Coast, Australia	18th (q)	2.10 m
2018	Mediterranean Games	Tarragona, Spain	4th	2.20 m
2018	European Championships	Berlin, Germany	26th (q)	2.11 m
2024	European Championships	Rome, Italy	14th (q)	2.17 m
