= Yun Seung-hyun =

South Korean high jumper

Personal information
- Born: 1 June 1994 (age 32)
- Education: Korea National Sport University
- Height: 1.93 m (6 ft 4 in)
- Weight: 75 kg (165 lb)

Korean name
- Hangul: 윤승현
- RR: Yun Seunghyeon
- MR: Yun Sŭnghyŏn

Sport
- Sport: Athletics
- Event: High jump

Yun Seung-hyun (Korean pronunciation: [jun.sɯŋ.ɦjʌn]; born 1 June 1994) is a South Korean athlete specialising in the high jump. He represented his country at the 2016 Summer Olympics without qualifying for the final.

His personal bests in the event are 2.32 metres outdoors (Yeosu 2015) and 2.25 metres indoors (Manhattan 2016).

== International competitions ==
Year	Competition	Venue	Position	Notes
Representing South Korea
2011	World Youth Championships	Lille, France	4th	2.09 m
2012	World Junior Championships	Barcelona, Spain	16th (q)	2.14 m
2013	Universiade	Kazan, Russia	20th (q)	2.10 m
2014	Asian Games	Incheon, South Korea	6th	2.20 m
2015	Universiade	Gwangju, South Korea	8th	2.20 m
2016	Asian Indoor Championships	Doha, Qatar	7th	2.20 m
2016	Olympic Games	Rio de Janeiro, Brazil	43rd (q)	2.17 m
