= Athletics at the 2015 Summer Universiade – Men's high jump =

The men's high jump event at the 2015 Summer Universiade was held on 8 and 10 July at the Gwangju Universiade Main Stadium.

== Medalists ==
Gold	Silver	Bronze
Daniil Tsyplakov; Russia	Matúš Bubeník; Slovakia	Hsiang Chun-Hsien; Chinese Taipei

== Results ==
=== Qualification ===
Qualification: 2.23 m (Q) or at least 12 best (q) qualified for the final.

Rank	Group	Athlete	Nationality	1.90	2.00	2.10	2.15	2.20	Result	Notes
1	A	Lukáš Beer	Slovakia	–	o	o	o	–	2.15	q
1	A	Hsiang Chun-Hsien	Chinese Taipei	–	–	o	o	–	2.15	q
1	A	Dmitriy Semenov	Russia	–	–	o	o	–	2.15	q
1	A	Raivydas Stanys	Lithuania	–	–	o	o	–	2.15	q
1	B	Sylwester Bednarek	Poland	–	o	o	o	–	2.15	q
1	B	Matúš Bubeník	Slovakia	–	–	o	o	x	2.15	q
1	B	Gao Woqi	China	–	o	o	o	–	2.15	q, SB
1	B	Daniil Tsyplakov	Russia	–	–	o	o	–	2.15	q
9	B	Yun Seung-hyun	South Korea	–	o	xo	o	–	2.15	q, SB
10	A	Florian Labourel	France	–	o	xo	xo	–	2.15	q
11	B	Mpho Links	South Africa	–	–	o	xxo	–	2.15	q
12	B	Ivan Kristoffer Nilsen	Norway	o	o	o	xxo	–	2.15	q, SB
13	A	Woo Sang-hyeok	South Korea	–	o	xo	xxo	–	2.15	q
14	A	Douwe Amels	Netherlands	–	–	o	xxx		2.10	
15	A	Yuji Hiramatsu	Japan	–	–	xo	xxx		2.10	
15	B	Cody Crampton	United States	o	o	xo	xxx		2.10	
17	B	Deniss Tsernobajev	Estonia	xo	o	xxo	xxx		2.10	SB
18	B	Nauraj Singh	Malaysia	o	o	xxx			2.00	
19	A	Tshwanelo Aabobe	Botswana	o	xo	xxx			2.00	
19	A	Marcel Mayack II	Cameroon	o	xo	xxx			2.00	
	A	Majid Al-Maqbali	Oman	xxx					NM	
	A	Athapaththu Mudiyanselage	Sri Lanka	xxx					NM	
	B	Oscar Katuka	Zimbabwe	–	xxx				NM	

=== Final ===
Official Video

Rank	Athlete	Nationality	2.00	2.05	2.10	2.15	2.20	2.24	2.28	2.31	2.35	Result	Notes
1st place, gold medalist(s)	Daniil Tsyplakov	Russia	–	–	o	o	o	o	xxo	xxo	xxx	2.31	
2nd place, silver medalist(s)	Matúš Bubeník	Slovakia	–	–	o	o	o	xo	o	xxx		2.28	PB
3rd place, bronze medalist(s)	Hsiang Chun-Hsien	Chinese Taipei	–	–	–	o	xxo	xo	o	xxx		2.28	NR
4	Raivydas Stanys	Lithuania	–	–	o	o	o	o	xxx			2.24	
5	Woo Sang-hyeok	South Korea	–	o	o	o	o	xo	xxx			2.24	SB
6	Sylwester Bednarek	Poland	–	–	o	xo	xo	xxx				2.20	
6	Lukáš Beer	Slovakia	o	–	xo	o	xo	xxx				2.20	SB
8	Yun Seung-hyun	South Korea	–	o	o	o	xxo	xxx				2.20	SB
9	Dmitriy Semenov	Russia	–	–	o	xo	xxx					2.15	
10	Florian Labourel	France	–	–	xo	xo	xxx					2.15	
10	Ivan Kristoffer Nilsen	Norway	xo	o	o	xo	xxx					2.15	
12	Gao Woqi	China	o	o	o	xxx						2.10	
12	Mpho Links	South Africa	–	o	o	xxx						2.10	
