= Matúš Bubeník =

Slovak high jumper

Personal information
- Born: 14 November 1989 (age 36) Hodonín, Czechoslovakia
- Education: Masaryk University
- Height: 1.97 m (6 ft 6 in)
- Weight: 78 kg (172 lb)

Sport
- Sport: Track and field
- Event: High jump
Medal record
Men's Athletics
Representing Slovakia
European Games
Gold medal – first place	2015 Baku	Mixed team
Universiade
Silver medal – second place	2015 Gwengju	High jump

Matúš Bubeník (born 14 November 1989 in Hodonín) is a Slovak athlete specialising in the high jump. He won the silver medal at the 2015 Summer Universiade.

His personal bests in the event are 2.29 metres outdoor (Banská Bystrica 2015) and 2.31 metres indoor (Banská Bystrica 2015).

== Competition record ==
Year	Competition	Venue	Position	Notes
Representing Slovakia
2011	European U23 Championships	Ostrava, Czech Republic	8th	2.18 m
2013	European Indoor Championships	Gothenburg, Sweden	18th (q)	2.18 m
2014	European Championships	Zürich, Switzerland	18th (q)	2.19 m
2015	European Indoor Championships	Prague, Czech Republic	9th (q)	2.24 m
2015	Universiade	Gwangju, South Korea	2nd	2.28 m
2015	World Championships	Beijing, China	37th (q)	2.17 m
2016	European Championships	Amsterdam, Netherlands	15th (q)	2.23 m
2016	Olympic Games	Rio de Janeiro, Brazil	35th (q)	2.17 m
2017	European Indoor Championships	Belgrade, Serbia	5th	2.27 m
2018	European Championships	Berlin, Germany	20th (q)	2.16 m
2019	European Indoor Championships	Glasgow, United Kingdom	10th (q)	2.25 m
