= 2019 European Athletics Indoor Championships – Men's high jump =

The men's high jump event at the 2019 European Athletics Indoor Championships was held on 1 March at 12:30 (qualification) and 2 March at 18:00 (final) local time.

== Medalists ==
Gold	Silver	Bronze
Gianmarco Tamberi; Italy	Konstadinos Baniotis; Greece; Andriy Protsenko; Ukraine	

== Records ==
Standing records prior to the 2019 European Athletics Indoor Championships
World record	Javier Sotomayor (CUB)	2.43	Budapest, Hungary	4 March 1989
European record	Carlo Thränhardt (FRG)	2.42	Berlin, West Germany	26 February 1988
Championship record	Stefan Holm (SWE)	2.40	Madrid, Spain	6 March 2005
World Leading	Naoto Tobe (JPN)	2.35	Karlsruhe, Germany	2 February 2019
European Leading	Gianmarco Tamberi (ITA)	2.32	Ancona, Italy	15 February 2019

== Results ==
=== Qualification ===
Qualification: Qualifying performance 2.28 (Q) or at least 8 best performers (q) advance to the Final

Rank	Group	Athlete	Nationality	2.10	2.16	2.21	2.25	2.28	Result	Note
1	B	Mateusz Przybylko	Germany	xo	o	xo	xxo	xo	2.28	Q, SB
2	A	Andriy Protsenko	Ukraine	o	o	o	o	xxx	2.25	q
3	A	Sylwester Bednarek	Poland	o	xo	o	o	xxx	2.25	q
4	A	Chris Baker	Great Britain	o	o	o	xo	xxx	2.25	q
4	A	Gianmarco Tamberi	Italy	–	o	o	xo	xxx	2.25	q
4	A	Falk Wendrich	Germany	o	o	o	xo	xxx	2.25	q
7	B	Tihomir Ivanov	Bulgaria	o	o	xo	xo	xxx	2.25	q
8	B	Konstadinos Baniotis	Greece	–	o	xxo	xo	xxx	2.25	q
9	B	Ilya Ivanyuk	Authorised Neutral Athletes	o	o	o	xxo	xxx	2.25	
10	B	Matúš Bubeník	Slovakia	o	o	xxo	xxo	xxx	2.25	SB
11	A	Adrijus Glebauskas	Lithuania	o	xo	o	xxx		2.21	PB
12	A	Alperen Acet	Turkey	–	xo	xo	xxx		2.21	
12	B	Andrei Skabeika	Belarus	o	xo	xo	xxx		2.21	
14	A	Maksim Nedasekau	Belarus	o	o	xxo	xxx		2.21	
15	A	Martin Heindl	Czech Republic	o	xo	xxx			2.16	
15	B	Dmitriy Kroytor	Israel	o	xo	xxx			2.16	
17	A	Lukáš Beer	Slovakia	o	xxo	xxx			2.16	
18	B	Norbert Kobielski	Poland	o	xxx				2.10	
	A	Dmytro Demyanyuk	Ukraine	xxx					NM	

=== Final ===
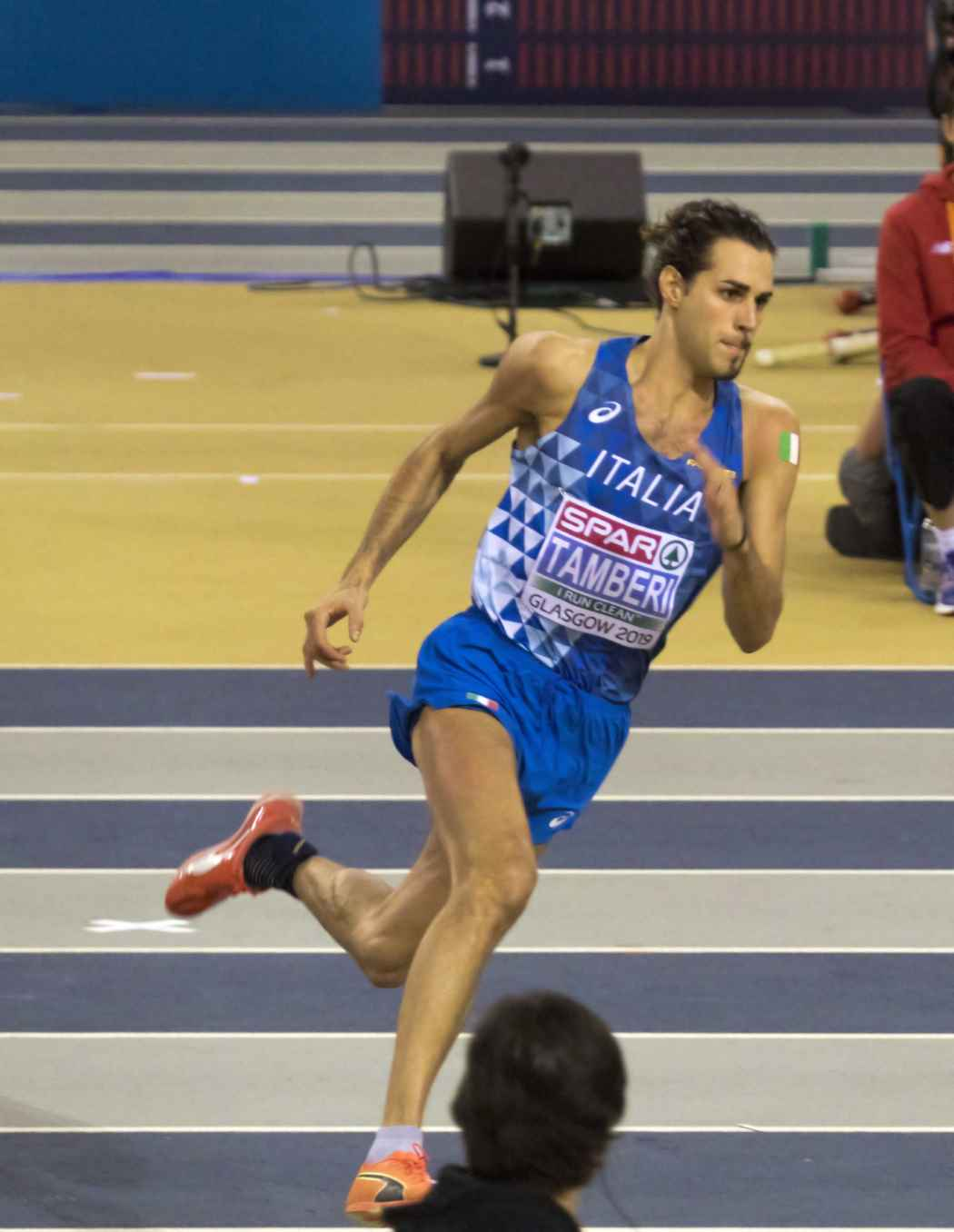
The winner, Gianmarco Tamberi

Rank	Athlete	Nationality	2.18	2.22	2.26	2.29	2.32	2.34	2.36	Result	Note
1st place, gold medalist(s)	Gianmarco Tamberi	Italy	o	o	o	o	xo	x-	xx	2.32	=EL
2nd place, silver medalist(s)	Konstadinos Baniotis	Greece	o	xo	xxo	x–	xx			2.26	
2nd place, silver medalist(s)	Andriy Protsenko	Ukraine	o	xo	xxo	x–	xx			2.26	
4	Chris Baker	Great Britain	o	o	xxx					2.22	
4	Tihomir Ivanov	Bulgaria	o	o	xxx					2.22	
6	Sylwester Bednarek	Poland	xo	o	xxx					2.22	
7	Falk Wendrich	Germany	o	xxx						2.18	
8	Mateusz Przybylko	Germany	xxo	xxx						2.18	
