= Adonios Mastoras =

Greek high jumper (born 1991)

Personal information
- Born: January 6, 1991 (age 35)

Sport
- Country: Greece
- Sport: Athletics
- Event: High jump

Achievements and titles
- Personal bests: 2.30 m 2.31 m (i)
Medal record
European Indoor Championships
Silver medal – second place	2015 Prague	High jump

Antonios Mastoras (Greek: Αντώνιος Μάστορας; born January 6, 1991) is a Greek high jumper. He took the fourth place at the 2013 European Indoor Championships in Gothenburg and won the bronze medal, the same year, at the European U23 Championships in Tampere.

== Competition record ==
Year	Competition	Venue	Position	Notes
Representing Greece
2008	World Junior Championships	Bydgoszcz, Poland	6th	2.17 m
2010	World Junior Championships	Moncton, New Brunswick, Canada	14th (q)	2.14 m
2013	European Indoor Championships	Gothenburg, Sweden	4th	2.29 m PB
2013	European U23 Championships	Tampere, Finland	3rd	2.26 m
2013	Mediterranean Games	Mersin, Turkey	5th	2.21 m
2013	World Championships	Moscow, Russia	13th (q)	2.26 m
2014	European Championships	Zürich, Switzerland	21st (q)	2.15 m
2015	European Indoor Championships	Prague, Czech Republic	2nd	2.31 m PB

== Personal life ==
He hails from Neo Petritsi, Serres.
