= Eugenio Rossi (athlete) =

Athlete from San Marino

Personal information
- Born: March 6, 1992 (age 34)
- Height: 1.92 m (6 ft 3 1/2 in)
- Weight: 75 kg (165 lb)

Sport
- Country: San Marino
- Sport: Track and field
- Event: High jump

Achievements and titles
- Personal bests: High jump: outdoors: 2.27 m (7 ft 5 in) (2015); indoors: 2.24 m (7 ft 4 in) (2018)

Eugenio Rossi (born 6 March 1992) is an athlete from San Marino specialising in the high jump. He represented his country at the 2016 Olympic Games, and multiple other major championships. He has personal bests of 2.27 metres (7 ft 5 in) outdoors (Caprino Veronese 2015) and 2.24 metres (7 ft 4 in) indoors (Ancona 2018). Both are current national records.

== Career ==
Rossi is coached by Giulio Ciotti. He was a member of Olimpus San Marino before joining Atletica Biotekna Marcon. He won two silver medals and one bronze in various editions of the Italian youth championships prior to February 2014, when Rossi became the new U23 Italian Indoor High Jump Champion. In June 2014 in Piedmont he increases his national record from 2.20 metres to 2.21 metres. That summer, he competed at the 2014 European Athletics Championships in Zurich, Switzerland, where he jumped 2.19 metres but missed out on a place in the final only on countback.

He also cleared 2.19 metres at the 2015 European Athletics Indoor Championships in Prague, finishing joint-fifteenth in qualifying. He had a best jump of 2.17 metres at the 2015 World Championships in Athletics in Beijing, China. In 2015, he improved the national record twice, peaking at 2.27 metres.

He jumped 2.23 metres at the 2016 European Athletics Championships in Amsterdam, Netherlands. He represented San Marino at the 2016 Olympic Games in Rio de Janeiro, Brazil, but did not qualify for the final.

In 2017, he finished second at the Italian Championships in Trieste with a best jump of 2.18 meters. That summer he triumphed at the Galà Drovandi in Livorno, winning the competition with 2.24 m at his first attempt, beating the Italian champion Eugenio Meloni who could not jump higher than 2.20. The following day, Rossi jumped at the Città di Nembro meeting, near Bergamo, and achieved another success with a seasons best jump of 2.25 m.

== Competition record ==
Year	Competition	Venue	Position	Notes
Representing San Marino
2011	Games of the Small States of Europe	Schaan, Liechtenstein	2nd	2.03 m (6 ft 8 in)
2011	European Junior Championships	Tallinn, Estonia	19th (q)	2.05 m (6 ft 9 in)
2012	European Championships	Helsinki, Finland	32nd (q)	2.00 m (6 ft 7 in)
2013	European Indoor Championships	Gothenburg, Sweden	26th (q)	2.08 m (6 ft 10 in)
2013	Games of the Small States of Europe	Luxembourg, Luxembourg	2nd	2.06 m (6 ft 9 in)
2013	Mediterranean Games	Mersin, Turkey	11th	2.10 m (6 ft 11 in)
2013	European U23 Championships	Tampere, Finland	25th (q)	2.09 m (6 ft 10 in)
2014	European Championships	Zürich, Switzerland	16th (q)	2.19 m (7 ft 2 in)
2015	European Indoor Championships	Prague, Czech Republic	16th (q)	2.19 m (7 ft 2 in)
2015	Games of the Small States of Europe	Reykjavík, Iceland	2nd	2.15 m (7 ft 1 in)
2015	World Championships	Beijing, China	37th (q)	2.17 m (7 ft 1 in)
2016	European Championships	Amsterdam, Netherlands	13th (q)	2.23 m (7 ft 4 in)
2016	Olympic Games	Rio de Janeiro, Brazil	35th (q)	2.17 m (7 ft 1 in)
2017	Games of the Small States of Europe	Serravalle, San Marino	2nd	2.18 m (7 ft 2 in)
2018	Mediterranean Games	Tarragona, Spain	6th	2.15 m (7 ft 1 in)
2018	European Championships	Berlin, Germany	–	NM
2021	Championships of the Small States of Europe	Serravalle, San Marino	1st	2.18 m (7 ft 2 in)
