= 2015 World Championships in Athletics – Men's high jump =

Men's high jump at the 2015 World Championships
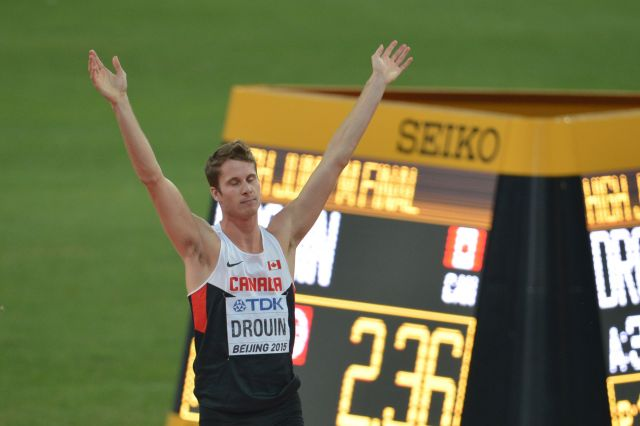
- Winner Derek Drouin
- Venue: Beijing National Stadium
- Dates: 28 August (qualification); 30 August (final)
- Competitors: 40 from 26 nations
- Winning height: 2.34

Medalists
gold medal	Derek Drouin	Canada
silver medal	Bohdan Bondarenko	Ukraine
silver medal	Zhang Guowei	China

The men's high jump at the 2015 World Championships in Athletics was held at the Beijing National Stadium on 28 and 30 August.

In the trials, only nine were able to get over 2.31, so they took perfect to 2.29 to fill out the field. In the final, only seven were able to make 2.29 and at the next height 2.33 they were down to four, Derek Drouin, Bohdan Bondarenko, Zhang Guowei and Mutaz Essa Barshim all on their first attempt. In fact all but Barshim were perfect to that point. Nobody could make 2.36, which left a three way tie for first and Barshim, the odd man out. They did a fourth, jumpoff attempt at 2.36, nobody made it. The next step lowered the bar to 2.34. Drouin cleared it, putting do or die pressure on the others. Neither made it giving Drouin the gold and leaving a tie for silver.

== Records ==
Prior to the competition, the records were as follows:

World record	Javier Sotomayor (CUB)	2.45	Salamanca, Spain	27 July 1993
Championship record	Bohdan Bondarenko (UKR)	2.41	Moscow, Russia	15 August 2013
World leading	Mutaz Essa Barshim (QAT)	2.41	Eugene, OR, United States	30 May 2015
African record	Jacques Freitag (RSA)	2.38	Oudtshoorn, South Africa	5 March 2005
Asian record	Mutaz Essa Barshim (QAT)	2.43	Brussels, Belgium	5 September 2014
North, Central American and Caribbean record	Javier Sotomayor (CUB)	2.45	Salamanca, Spain	27 July 1993
South American record	Gilmar Mayo (COL)	2.33A	Pereira, Colombia	17 October 1994
European record	Patrik Sjöberg (SWE)	2.42	Stockholm, Sweden	30 June 1987
European record	Bohdan Bondarenko (UKR)	2.42	New York City, United States	14 June 2014
Oceanian record	Tim Forsyth (AUS)	2.36	Melbourne, Australia	2 March 1997

== Qualification standards ==
Entry standards
2.28

== Schedule ==
Date	Time	Round
28 August 2015	09:45	Qualification
30 August 2015	18:30	Final

All times are local times (UTC+8)

== Results ==
KEY:	Q	Qualified	q	12 best performers	NR	National record	PB	Personal best	SB	Seasonal best

=== Qualification ===
Qualification: 2.31 m (Q) or at least 12 best performers (q).

Rank	Group	Name	Nationality	2.17	2.22	2.26	2.29	2.31	Mark	Notes
1	A	Derek Drouin	Canada	o	o	o	o	o	2.31	Q
1	B	Zhang Guowei	China	o	o	o	o	o	2.31	Q
3	B	Bohdan Bondarenko	Ukraine	–	o	–	xo	o	2.31	Q
3	A	Mutaz Essa Barshim	Qatar	–	o	o	xo	o	2.31	Q
5	A	Brandon Starc	Australia	o	o	xxo	xxo	o	2.31	Q, PB
6	A	Eike Onnen	Germany	o	o	o	o	xxo	2.31	Q
7	B	Dimitrios Chondrokoukis	Cyprus	o	o	o	xo	xxo	2.31	Q
8	B	Jaroslav Bába	Czech Republic	o	o	o	xxo	xxo	2.31	Q, SB
8	A	Konstadinos Baniotis	Greece	o	o	xo	xo	xxo	2.31	Q, SB
10	B	Daniil Tsyplakov	Russia	o	o	o	o	xx–	2.29	q
10	B	Donald Thomas	Bahamas	o	o	o	o	x–	2.29	q
10	B	Erik Kynard	United States	o	o	o	o	xxx	2.29	q
10	A	Gianmarco Tamberi	Italy	o	o	o	o	xxx	2.29	q
10	A	Trevor Barry	Bahamas	o	o	o	o	xxx	2.29	q, SB
15	B	Majd Eddin Ghazal	Syria	o	o	xo	o	xxx	2.29	NR
16	A	JaCorian Duffield	United States	xxo	o	o	o	xxx	2.29	
17	A	Andriy Protsenko	Ukraine	o	xo	xo	xo	xxx	2.29	
18	B	Michael Mason	Canada	o	o	o	xxx		2.26	
18	A	Robert Grabarz	Great Britain & N.I.	–	o	o	xxx		2.26	
18	A	Wang Yu	China	o	o	o	xxx		2.26	
21	B	Joel Baden	Australia	o	xo	o	xxx		2.26	SB
22	A	Jesse Williams	United States	o	o	xo	xxx		2.26	
22	A	Mihai Donisan	Romania	o	o	xo	xxx		2.26	
24	A	Ivan Ukhov	Russia	o	xo	xo	xxx		2.26	
25	B	Ryan Ingraham	Bahamas	xxo	–	xo	xxx		2.26	
25	A	Naoto Tobe	Japan	o	xxo	xo	xxx		2.26	
27	B	Dmytro Yakovenko	Ukraine	xo	o	xxo	xxx		2.26	
28	B	Mateusz Przybylko	Germany	o	o	xxx			2.22	
28	A	Kabelo Kgosiemang	Botswana	o	o	xxx			2.22	
28	A	Takashi Eto	Japan	o	o	xxx			2.22	
28	A	Yuriy Krymarenko	Ukraine	o	o	xxx			2.22	
32	B	Hsiang Chun-Hsien	Chinese Taipei	xxo	o	–	xxx		2.22	
33	B	Dmitry Kroyter	Israel	o	xo	xxx			2.22	
33	A	Sylwester Bednarek	Poland	o	xo	xxx			2.22	
35	B	Yuji Hiramatsu	Japan	o	xxx				2.17	
35	A	Ali Mohd Younes Idriss	Sudan	o	xxx				2.17	
37	B	Eugenio Rossi	San Marino	xo	xxx				2.17	
37	B	Matúš Bubeník	Slovakia	xo	xxx				2.17	
39	B	Talles Frederico Silva	Brazil	xxo	xxx				2.17	
	B	Raivydas Stanys	Lithuania	xxx					NM	
	B	Marco Fassinotti	Italy						DNS	

=== Final ===
The final was started at 18:30

Rank	Name	Nationality	2.20	2.25	2.29	2.33	2.36	2.36	2.34	Mark	Notes
1st place, gold medalist(s)	Derek Drouin	Canada	o	o	o	o	xxx	x	o	2.34	
2nd place, silver medalist(s)	Bohdan Bondarenko	Ukraine	−	o	−	o	xxx	x	x	2.33	
2nd place, silver medalist(s)	Zhang Guowei	China	o	o	o	o	xxx	x	x	2.33	
4	Mutaz Essa Barshim	Qatar	o	o	xo	o	xxx			2.33	
5	Daniil Tsyplakov	Russia	o	o	o	xxx				2.29	
6	Donald Thomas	Bahamas	o	o	xo	−	xxx			2.29	
7	Jaroslav Bába	Czech Republic	o	xo	xo	xxx				2.29	
8	Erik Kynard	United States	o	o	xxx					2.25	
8	Gianmarco Tamberi	Italy	o	o	xxx					2.25	
10	Trevor Barry	Bahamas	xxo	o	xxx					2.25	
11	Dimitrios Chondrokoukis	Cyprus	o	xo	xxx					2.25	
12	Brandon Starc	Australia	o	xxo	xxx					2.25	
12	Eike Onnen	Germany	o	xxo	xxx					2.25	
14	Konstadinos Baniotis	Greece	xo	xxx						2.20	
