= Pavel Seliverstau =

Belarusian high jumper

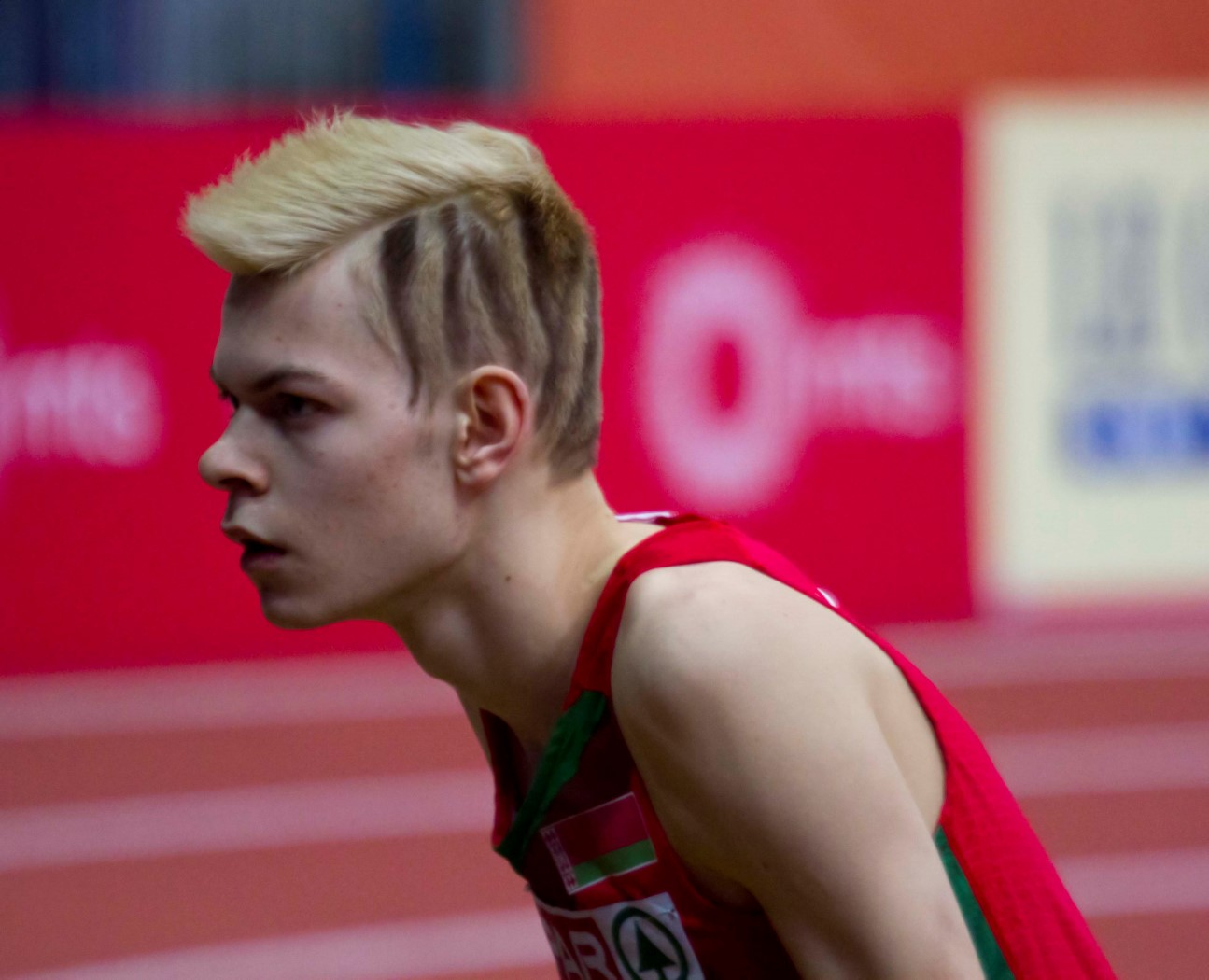
- Seliverstau in 2017

Medal record

Men's athletics

Representing Belarus

European Indoor Championships
Bronze medal – third place	2017 Belgrade	High jump

Pavel Vadimovich Seliverstau (Belarusian: Павел Вадзімавіч Селівёрстаў; born 2 September 1996) is a Belarusian track and field athlete who competes in the high jump. He holds a personal best of 2.32 m (7 ft 7 1/4 in), set indoors in 2017. He was a bronze medallist at the 2017 European Athletics Indoor Championships and represented his country at the 2016 European Athletics Championships.

In his youth, he competed at the 2013 World Youth Championships in Athletics and the 2015 European Athletics Junior Championships.

== International competitions ==
Year	Competition	Venue	Position	Notes
2013	World Youth Championships	Donetsk, Ukraine	17th (q)	2.07 m
2015	European Junior Championships	Eskilstuna, Sweden	5th	2.17 m
2016	European Championships	Amsterdam, Netherlands	19th (q)	2.19 m
2017	European Indoor Championships	Belgrade, Serbia	3rd	2.27 m
2017	European U23 Championships	Bydgoszcz, Poland	5th	2.22 m
