= Tihomir Ivanov =

Bulgarian high jumper (born 1994)

Personal information
- Born: 11 July 1994 (age 32) Pleven, Bulgaria
- Height: 1.96 m (6 ft 5 in)

Sport
- Sport: Athletics
- Event: High jump
Medal record
Event	1st	2nd	3rd
Summer Universiade	1	0	0
Total	1	0	0
Summer Universiade
Gold medal – first place	2019 Naples	high jump

Tihomir Ivaylov Ivanov (Bulgarian: Тихомир Ивайлов Иванов; born 11 July 1994) is a Bulgarian athlete specialising in the high jump. He won a gold medal at the 2019 Summer Universiade in Naples.

He has personal bests of 2.31 metres outdoors (London 2017) and 2.28 metres indoors (Banská Bystrica & Beograd 2017).

== Competition record ==
Year	Competition	Venue	Position	Notes
Representing Bulgaria
2011	European Youth Olympic Festival	Trabzon, Turkey	7th	2.00 m
2013	European Junior Championships	Rieti, Italy	12th	2.10 m
2014	European Championships	Zürich, Switzerland	7th	2.26 m
2015	European Indoor Championships	Prague, Czech Republic	14th (q)	2.24 m
2015	European U23 Championships	Tallinn, Estonia	7th	2.18 m
2016	European Championships	Amsterdam, Netherlands	5th	2.24 m
2016	Olympic Games	Rio de Janeiro, Brazil	10th	2.29 m
2017	European Indoor Championships	Belgrade, Serbia	4th	2.27 m
2017	World Championships	London, United Kingdom	4th (q)	2.31 m^{1}
2018	World Indoor Championships	Birmingham, United Kingdom	9th	2.20 m
2019	European Indoor Championships	Glasgow, United Kingdom	4th	2.22 m
2019	Universiade	Naples, Italy	1st	2.30 m
2019	World Championships	Doha, Qatar	16th (q)	2.26 m
2021	European Indoor Championships	Toruń, Poland	9th (q)	2.16 m
2021	Olympic Games	Tokyo, Japan	26th (q)	2.17 m
2022	European Championships	Munich, Germany	8th	2.18 m
2023	European Indoor Championships	Istanbul, Turkey	9th	2.14 m
2023	World Championships	Budapest, Hungary	28th (q)	2.18 m
2024	European Championships	Rome, Italy	6th	2.22 m
2024	Olympic Games	Paris, France	8th	2.27 m
2025	European Indoor Championships	Apeldoorn, Netherlands	10th (q)	2.18 m
2025	World Championships	Tokyo, Japan	22nd (q)	2.16 m

^{1}No mark in the final
