= Maksim Nedasekau =

Belarusian high jumper (1998)

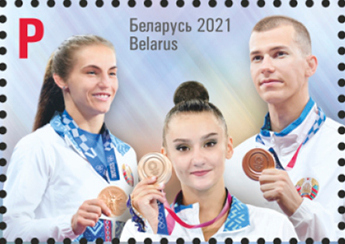
- Nedasekau (right) on a 2021 stamp of Belarus

Personal information
- Born: 21 January 1998 (age 28) Vitebsk, Belarus
- Height: 1.93 m (6 ft 4 in)
- Weight: 77 kg (170 lb)

Sport
- Sport: Athletics
- Event: High jump
- Club: Dynamo
- Coached by: Tatiana Nareiko, Vladimir Pologov
Medal record
Representing Belarus
Olympic Games
Bronze medal – third place	2020 Tokyo	High jump
European Indoor Championships
Gold medal – first place	2021 Toruń	High jump

Maksim Yuryevich Nedasekau (Belarusian: Максім Юр’евіч Недасекаў; born 21 January 1998) is a Belarusian athlete specialising in the high jump and praporshchik of the Sports Committee of the Armed Forces of Belarus. He was the bronze medallist at the 2020 Olympic Games. He also won the gold medals at the 2021 European Indoor Championships, 2019 European U23 Championships and 2017 European U20 Championships.

In 2019, he won the silver medal in the team event at the 2019 European Games.

His personal bests are 2.37 metres outdoors (2020 Olympic Games) and 2.37 metres indoors (Toruń 2021).

== International competitions ==
Year	Competition	Venue	Position	Notes
Representing Belarus
2016	World U20 Championships	Bydgoszcz, Poland	8th	2.18 m
2017	European U20 Championships	Grosseto, Italy	1st	2.33 m
2018	World Indoor Championships	Birmingham, United Kingdom	6th	2.20 m
2018	European Championships	Berlin, Germany	2nd	2.33 m
2019	European Indoor Championships	Glasgow, United Kingdom	14th (q)	2.21 m
2019	European U23 Championships	Gävle, Sweden	1st	2.29 m
2019	World Championships	Doha, Qatar	4th	2.33 m
2021	European Indoor Championships	Toruń, Poland	1st	2.37 m
2021	Olympic Games	Tokyo, Japan	3rd	2.37 m

== Politics ==
Nedasekau supports Alexander Lukashenko. In 2020, he condemned the protests and signed an open letter of the pro-government sportsmen. Nedasekau actively participates in children training in military-patriotic camps.

In April 2023, Nedasekau was blacklisted by Ukraine.

In July 2023, Nedasekau said in an interview that "Ukraine is conducting hostilities, people are dying, and their athletes are competing and rejoicing. What do I mean? They like to accuse us of competing, smiling, but there are fightings over there. Although, I would like to note, Belarus does not participate in the SMO. We are Union State with Russia, and therefore we provide support. But this is natural and normal, as it should be. But is it normal that the athletes of a country that is at war calmly participate in commercial competitions, earn money and have fun when their compatriots are fighting at the front?"

Sporting positions
Preceded by (Qatar) Mutaz Essa Barshim	Men's High Jump Best Year Performance alongside other five athletes 2020	Succeeded by Incumbent
