= Andriy Protsenko =

Ukrainian high jumper

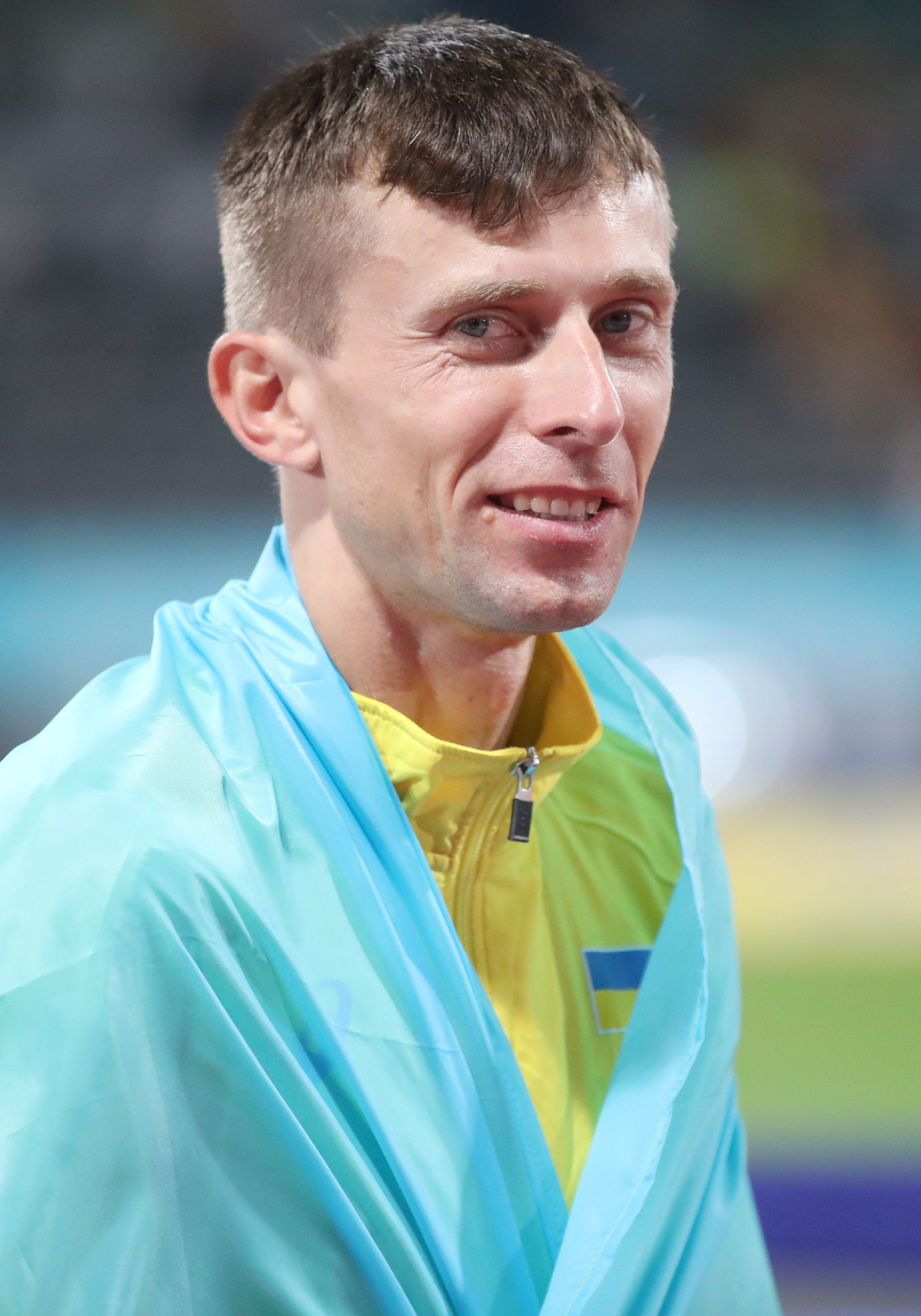
- Protsenko in 2022

Personal information
- Native name: Андрій Олексійович Проценко
- Full name: Andriy Oleksiyovych Protsenko
- Born: 20 May 1988 (age 38) Kherson, Ukrainian SSR, Soviet Union
- Height: 1.94 m (6 ft 4 in)
- Weight: 80 kg (176 lb)
Medal record
Men's athletics
Representing Ukraine
World Championships
Bronze medal – third place	2022 Eugene	High jump
World Indoor Championships
Silver medal – second place	2014 Sopot	High jump
European Championships
Silver medal – second place	2014 Zürich	High jump
Bronze medal – third place	2022 Munich	High jump
European Indoor Championships
Silver medal – second place	2019 Glasgow	High jump
Silver medal – second place	2023 Istanbul	High jump
European Games
Gold medal – first place	2019 Minsk	Team event
Universiade
Silver medal – second place	2013 Kazan	High jump
European Athletics Team Championships
Gold medal – first place	2014 Braunschweig	High jump
Bronze medal – third place	2010 Bergen	High jump
European U23 Championships
Bronze medal – third place	2009 Kaunas	High jump
European Junior Championships
Silver medal – second place	2007 Hengelo	High jump

Andrii Oleksiyovych Protsenko (Ukrainian: Андрій Олексійович Проценко; born 20 May 1988) is a Ukrainian high jumper. He is the 2022 World bronze medallist, 2014 World Indoor bronze medallist and European silver medallist.

== Career ==
He won the silver medal at the 2007 European Junior Championships, and the bronze medal at the 2009 European U23 Championships. He competed at the 2009 World Championships without reaching the final. He also competed at the 2011, 2013 and 2015 World Championships also without reaching the final.

His personal best jump is 2.40 metres, achieved in July 2014 in Lausanne. He became only 12th person in the history of men's high jump to jump over 2.40.

He won the 2019 Diamond League final in Zurich, with his season best of 2.32 m, which gave him a wild card entry for the 2019 World Athletics Championships in Doha.

Protsenko won a bronze medal at the 2022 World Athletics Championships in Eugene, United States. He said in his interview that he spent nearly 40 days in occupied Kherson Oblast before he was able to safely leave it. He spent those days in a village where he made improvised facilities to continue his trainings. After he left Ukraine to get prepared for the Worlds, he first trained in Portugal and then in Spain. He also mentioned in his interview that Gianmarco Tamberi, who also showed his support of Ukraine at the 2022 World Athletics Indoor Championships, supported and helped him a lot.

== Competition record ==
Year	Competition	Venue	Position	Notes
Representing Ukraine
2007	European Junior Championships	Hengelo, Netherlands	2nd	2.21 m
2009	European U23 Championships	Kaunas, Lithuania	3rd	2.24 m
2009	World Championships	Berlin, Germany	25th (q)	2.20 m
2010	European Championships	Barcelona, Spain	17th (q)	2.19 m
2011	Universiade	Shenzhen, China	11th	2.18 m
2011	World Championships	Daegu, South Korea	27th (q)	2.21 m
2012	World Indoor Championships	Istanbul, Turkey	15th (q)	2.22 m
2012	European Championships	Helsinki, Finland	13th (q)	2.23 m
2012	Olympic Games	London, United Kingdom	9th	2.25 m
2013	Universiade	Kazan, Russia	2nd	2.31 m
2013	World Championships	Moscow, Russia	23rd (q)	2.22 m
2014	World Indoor Championships	Sopot, Poland	2nd	2.36 m
2014	European Championships	Zürich, Switzerland	2nd	2.33 m
2015	European Indoor Championships	Prague, Czech Republic	6th	2.28 m
2015	World Championships	Beijing, China	17th (q)	2.29 m
2016	World Indoor Championships	Portland, United States	7th	2.29 m
2016	European Championships	Amsterdam, Netherlands	9th	2.24 m
2016	Olympic Games	Rio de Janeiro, Brazil	4th	2.33 m
2017	World Championships	London, United Kingdom	13th (q)	2.29 m
2018	European Championships	Berlin, Germany	5th	2.24 m
2019	European Indoor Championships	Glasgow, Scotland	2nd	2.26 m
2019	World Championships	Doha, Qatar	14th (q)	2.26 m
2021	Olympic Games	Tokyo, Japan	14th (q)	2.25 m
2022	World Championships	Eugene, United States	3rd	2.33 m
2022	European Championships	Munich, Germany	3rd	2.27 m
2023	European Indoor Championships	Istanbul, Turkey	2nd	2.29 m
2023	World Championships	Budapest, Hungary	11th	2.25 m
2024	World Indoor Championships	Glasgow, United Kingdom	11th	2.15 m
2024	Olympic Games	Paris, France	–	NM

== Personal life ==
Protsenko is married, has a daughter and resides with his family in Kherson.
