= Lukáš Beer =

Slovak high jumper (born 1989)

Personal information
- Born: 23 August 1989 (age 36) Košice, Czechoslovakia
- Education: University of Prešov
- Height: 1.86 m (6 ft 1 in)
- Weight: 73 kg (161 lb)

Sport
- Sport: Athletics
- Event: High jump
- Club: AC Stavbár Nitra
- Coached by: Dušan Veľký; Jaroslav Rusnák
Medal record
Men's athletics
Representing Slovakia
European Games
Silver medal – second place	2015 Baku	Mixed team

Lukáš Beer (born 23 August 1989) is a Slovak athlete specialising in the high jump. He won the silver medal at the 2015 European Games in Baku and finished the same year sixth at the 2015 Summer Universiade.

His personal bests in the event are 2.26 metres outdoors (Banská Bystrica 2014) and 2.28 metres indoors (Banská Bystrica 2017).

== International competitions ==
Year	Competition	Venue	Position	Notes
Representing Slovakia
2011	European U23 Championships	Ostrava, Czech Republic	17th (q)	2.04 m
2013	Jeux de la Francophonie	Nice, France	6th	2.20 m
2014	European Championships	Zürich, Switzerland	17th (q)	2.19 m
2015	European Indoor Championships	Prague, Czech Republic	16th (q)	2.19 m
2015	European U23 Championships	Tallinn, Estonia	17th (q)	2.10 m
2017	Universiade	Gwangju, South Korea	6th	2.20 m
2017	European Indoor Championships	Belgrade, Serbia	11th (q)	2.21 m
2018	European Championships	Berlin, Germany	20th (q)	2.16 m
2019	European Indoor Championships	Glasgow, United Kingdom	17th (q)	2.16 m
