= Ilya Ivanyuk =

Russian high jumper (born 1993)

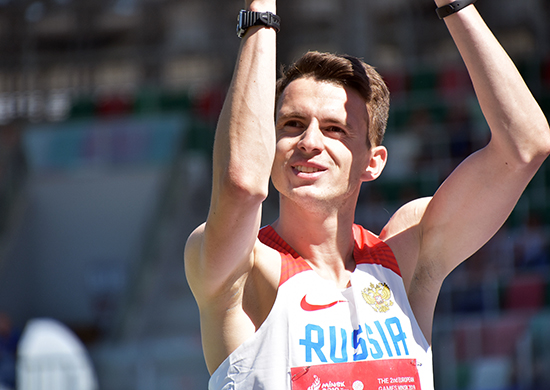

Personal information
- Full name: Ilya Dmitriyevich Ivanyuk
- National team: Russia
- Born: 9 March 1993 (age 33) Krasny, Smolensk Oblast, Russia
- Height: 1.79 m (5 ft 10 in)
- Weight: 75 kg (165 lb)m

Sport
- Country: Russia; ANA (2017–19, 2021-2022)
- Sport: Athletics
- Event: High jump
Medal record
World Championships
Bronze medal – third place	2019 Doha	High jump
European Championships
Bronze medal – third place	2018 Berlin	High jump
European Games
Silver medal – second place	2019 Minsk	High jump
Military World Games
Gold medal – first place	2019 Wuhan	High jump

Ilya Dmitriyevich Ivanyuk (Russian: Илья Дмитриевич Иванюк; born 9 March 1993) is a Russian athlete specialising in the high jump. He competed at the 2017 World Championships as an authorised neutral athlete finishing sixth and won the bronze medal at the 2018 European Championships. He is also the 2015 European U23 champion.

His personal bests are 2.37 metres outdoors and 2.31 metres indoors (Moscow 2017).

In April 2021, he was granted the status of Authorised Neutral Athlete by World Athletics. On 7 June 2022, he jumped 2.34 m in Moscow, Russia.

== International competitions ==
Year	Competition	Venue	Position	Notes
Representing Russia
2012	World Junior Championships	Barcelona, Spain	4th	2.21 m
2013	European U23 Championships	Tampere, Finland	6th	2.21 m
2015	European U23 Championships	Tallinn, Estonia	1st	2.30 m
Competing as Authorised Neutral Athlete
2017	World Championships	London, United Kingdom	6th	2.25 m
2018	European Championships	Berlin, Germany	3rd	2.31 m
2019	European Indoor Championships	Glasgow, United Kingdom	9th (q)	2.25 m
2019	World Championships	Doha, Qatar	3rd	2.35 m
2019	Military World Games	Wuhan, China	1st	2.20 m
2021	Olympic Games	Tokyo, Japan	9th	2.30 m
