= Christian Falocchi =

Italian high jumper

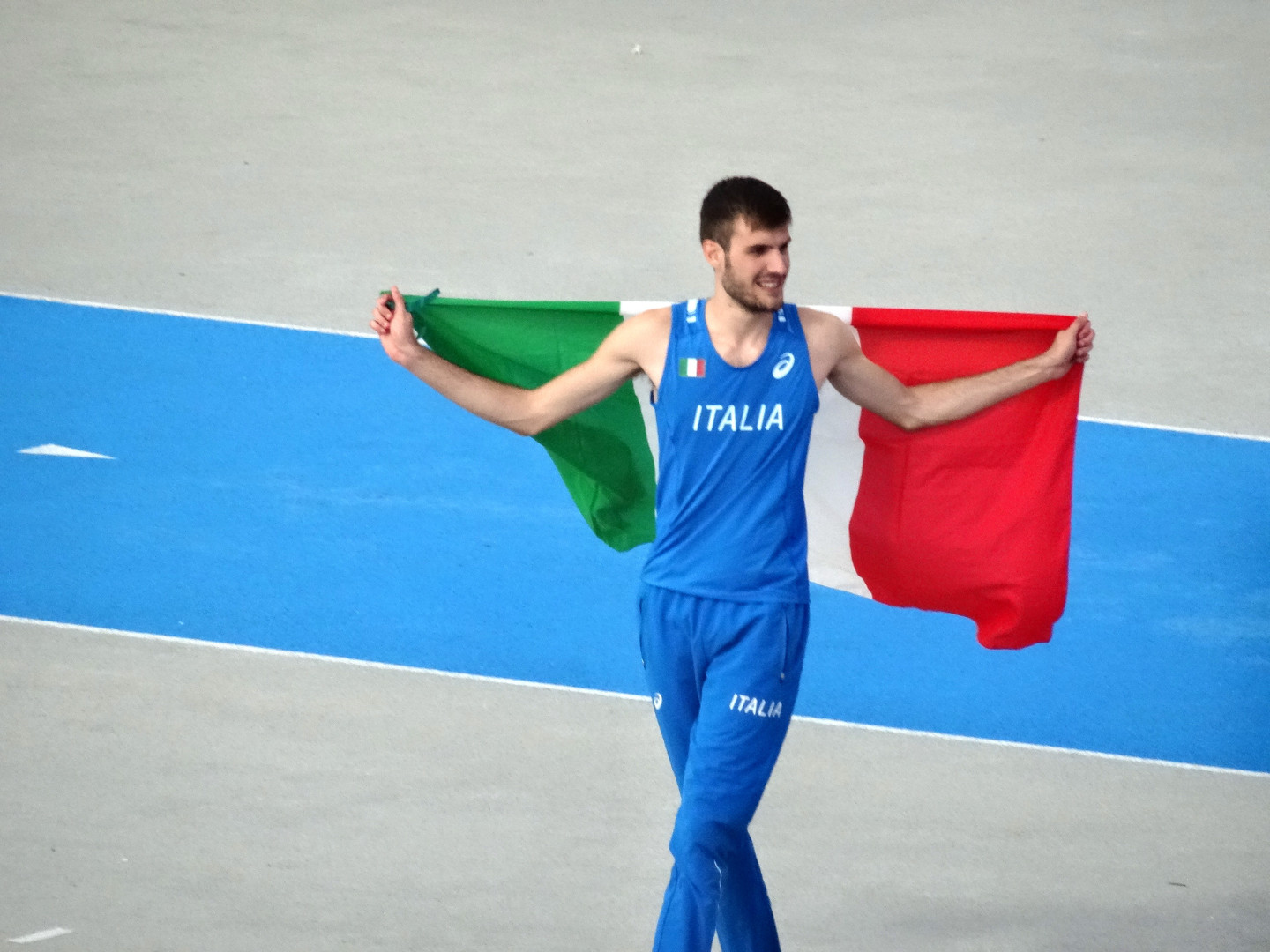
- Christian Falocchi in 2017

Personal information
- Nationality: Italian
- Born: 30 January 1997 (age 29) Lovere
- Height: 1.94 m (6 ft 4 1/2 in)
- Weight: 72 kg (159 lb)

Sport
- Country: Italy
- Sport: Athletics
- Event: High jump
- Club: Brixia Atletica 2014

Achievements and titles
- Personal bests: High jump outdoor 2.27 m (2026); High jump indoor: 2.30 m (2026)
Medal record
Men's athletics
Representing Italy
Mediterranean Games
Bronze medal – third place	2026 Taranto	High jump
European U23 Championships
Silver medal – second place	2017 Bydgoszcz	High jump

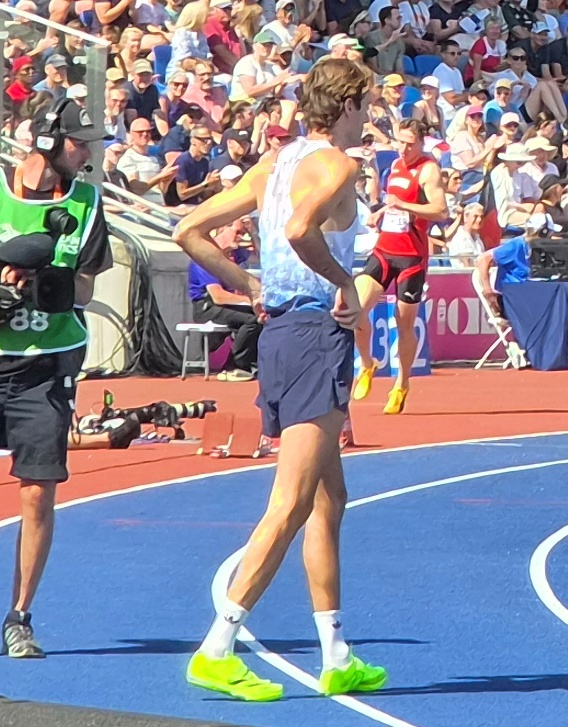
Falocchi at Birmingham 2026

Christian Falocchi (born 30 January 1997) is an Italian male high jumper, national champion at senior level in the high jump indoor in 2022

== Career ==
He was 13th at 2017 European Athletics Indoor Championships and won the silver medal at the 2017 European Athletics Indoor Championships. In February 2017, at age 20, he improved his Personal Best of 10 cm, bringing him from 2.15 m to 2.25 m This exploit has made it to the 27th place in end-of-season 2017 world-class lists.

He won the 2018 Mediterranean Athletics U23 Championships with the Championships record.

== Personal best ==
- High jump indoor: 2.25: (Italy) Ancona, 4 February 2017
- High jump outdoor: 2.24: (Poland) Bydgoszcz, 15 July 2017

== Progression ==
Since 1 November 2023, World Athletics officially unifies indoor and outdoor statistics for field events into a single progression under the "Short Track" rule changes.

Outdoor

Year (age)	Performance	Venue	Date	World Ranking
2026 (29)	2.27	(Monaco) Montecarlo	5 August	
2025 (28)	2.23	(Italy) Brescia	12 July	
2023 (26)	2.21	(Germany) Rehlingen	28 May	
2022 (25)	2.24	(Italy) Rovellasca	20 July	
2021 (24)	2.17	(Italy) Bergamo	12 September	
2019 (22)	2.18	(Italy) Cesena	25 May	
2018 (21)	2.20	(Spain) Madrid	22 June	
2017 (20)	2.24	(Poland) Bydgoszcz	15 July	54th
2016 (19)	2.12	(Italy) Busto Arsizio	8 May	
2015 (18)	2.15	(Italy) Nembro	1 July	
2013 (16)	1.99	(Italy) Cremona	9 June	

Indoor

Year (age)	Performance	Venue	Date	World Ranking
2026 (29)	2.30	(Italy) Ancona	1 March	8th
2023 (26)	2.21	(France) Metz	11 February	
2017 (20)	2.25	(Italy) Ancona	4 February	27th
2015 (18)	2.01	(Italy) Bergamo	18 January	

== Achievements ==
Year	Competition	Venue	Position	Event	Measure	Notes
2017	European Indoor Championships	(Serbia) Belgrade	13th	High jump	2.21 m	
2017	European U23 Championships	(Poland) Bydgoszcz	2nd	High jump	2.24 m	
2022	European Championships	(Turkey) Istanbul	6th	High jump	2.19 m	
2026	World Indoor Championships	(Poland) Torun	11th	High jump	2.19 m	
2026	European Championships	(United Kingdom) Birmingham	8th	High jump	2.18 m	

== National titles ==
Falocchi won two national championships at individual senior level.

- Italian Athletics Indoor Championships
  - High jump: 2022, 2026 (2)
