= Mateusz Przybylko =

German high jumper (born 1992)

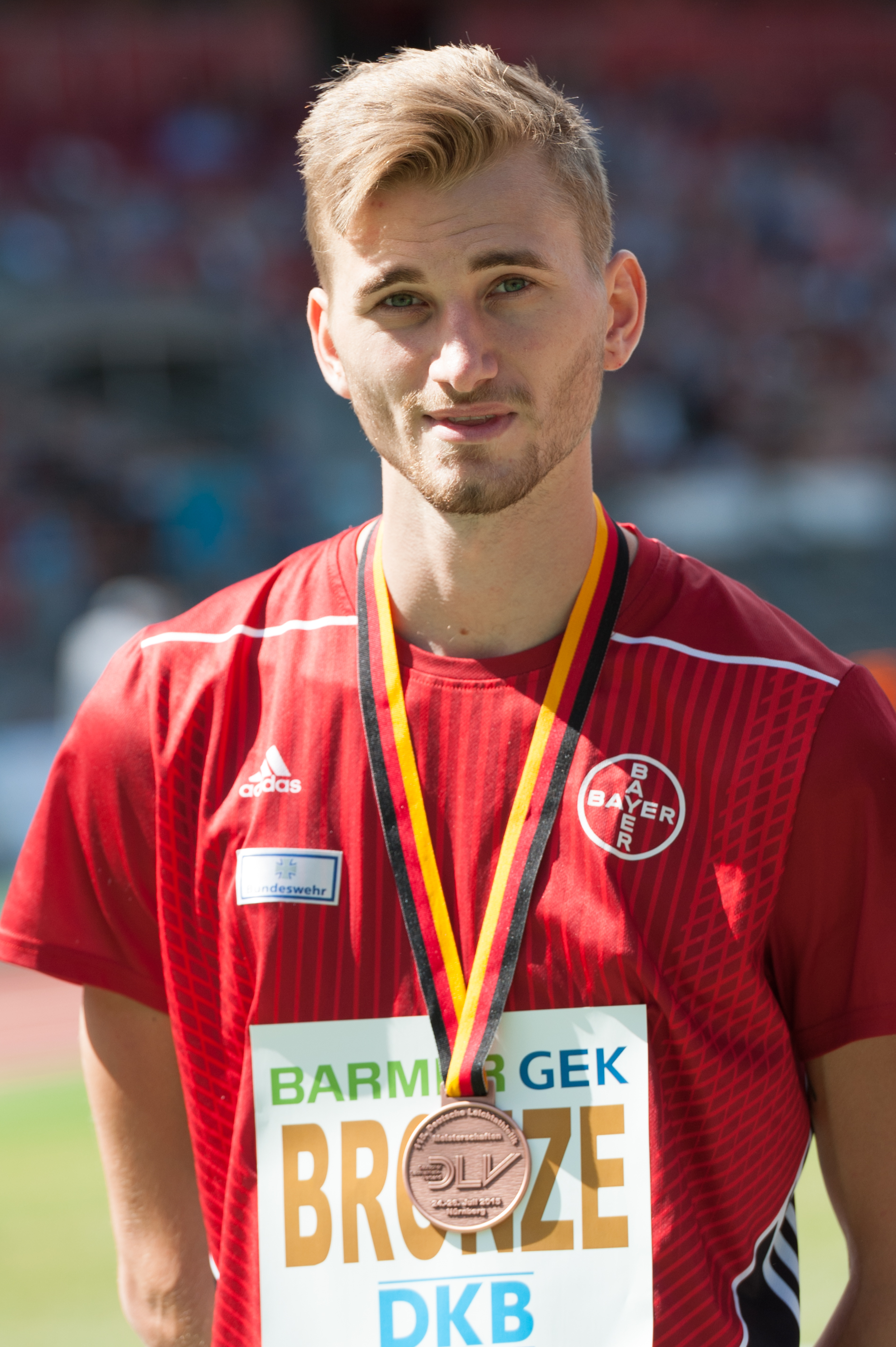

Personal information
- Born: 9 March 1992 (age 34) Bielefeld, Ostwestfalen- Lippe, Germany
- Height: 1.95 m (6 ft 5 in)
- Weight: 78 kg (172 lb)

Sport
- Country: Germany
- Sport: Athletics
- Event: High jump
- Club: TSV Bayer 04 Leverkusen
- Coached by: Hans-Jörg Thomaskamp

Achievements and titles
- Personal best: High jump: 2.35 (2017)
Medal record
World Indoor Championships
Bronze medal – third place	2018 Birmingham	High jump
European Championships
Gold medal – first place	2018 Berlin	High jump
- Updated on 11 August 2018

Mateusz Przybylko (born 9 March 1992) is a German high jumper of Polish descent. He won the gold medal at the 2018 European Championships.

== Career ==
A member of Germany's track and field squad at the 2015 IAAF World Championships and the 2016 Summer Olympics, Przybylko cleared a personal best of 2.35 m. Przybylko currently trains for the track and field squad at TSV Bayer 04 Leverkusen under the tutelage of his coach Hans-Jörg Thomaskamp.

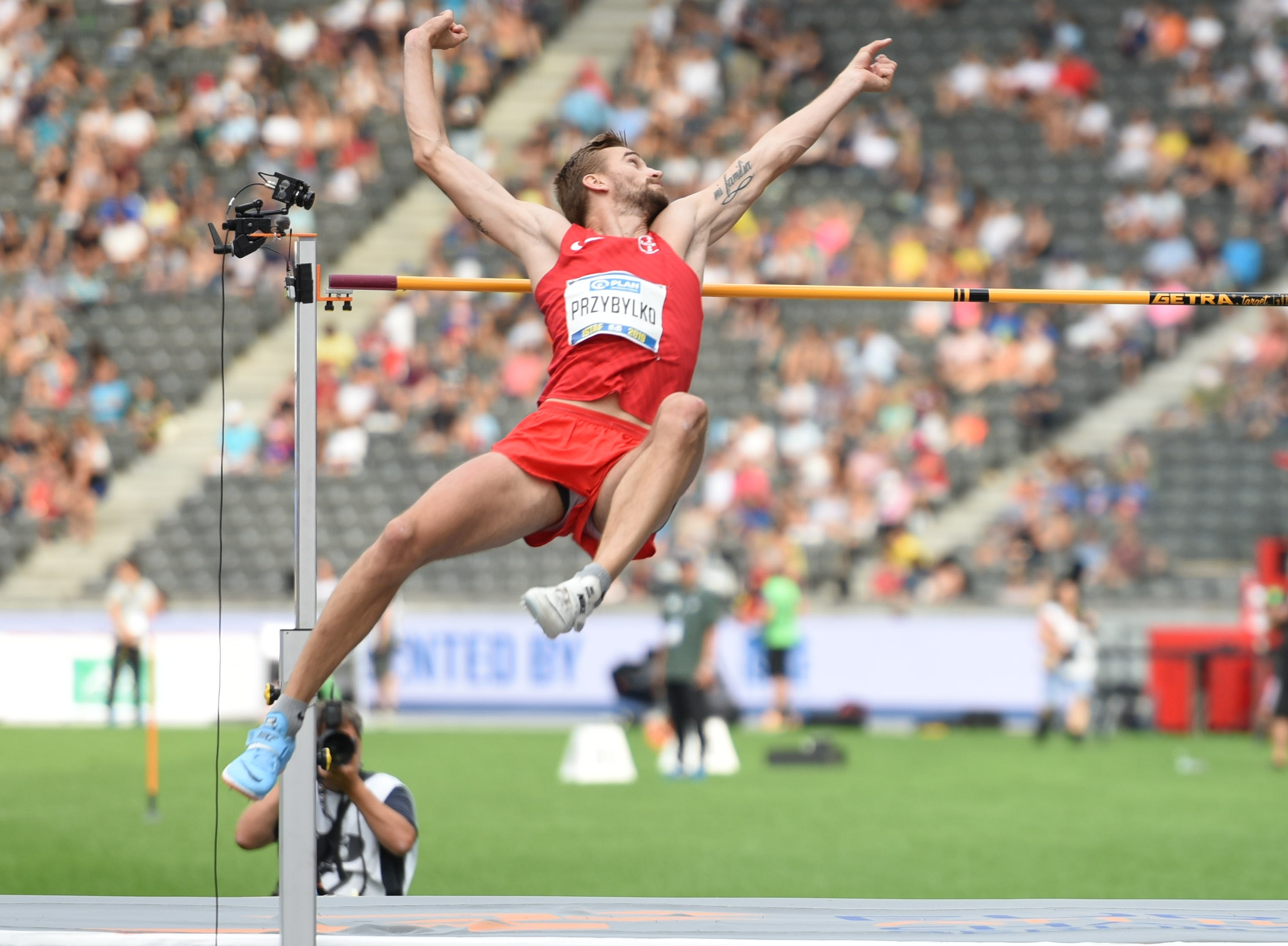
Przybylko at the ISTAF 2019 in Berlin

At the 2016 Summer Olympics in Rio de Janeiro, Przybylko competed for Germany, along with his fellow countryman Eike Onnen, in the men's high jump. Leading up to his maiden Games, Przybylko jumped a height of 2.30 metres to surpass the IAAF Olympic entry standard (2.29) by a single centimetre at the 2015 Kurpfalz Gala in Weinheim. During the qualifying phase, Przybylko elected to pass 2.17 at his second attempt and remained clean at 2.22, before he could not reach the 2.26-metre barrier with all three misses, ending his Olympic campaign in twenty-eighth place.

Przybylko also came from a sporting family of Polish origin. Mateusz's father Mariusz previously played for one of his native country's regional football clubs, while his mother Violetta ran for the Polish track and field team in her youth. Mateusz's younger brothers and twins Kacper and Jakub inherited their father's sporting talent to compete internationally for Poland in football.

== Competition record ==
Year	Competition	Venue	Position	Notes
Representing Germany
2009	World Youth Championships	Brixen, Italy	11th	2.09 m
2010	World Juniors Championships	Moncton, Canada	18th (q)	2.10 m
2011	European Junior Championships	Tallinn, Estonia	7th	2.19 m
2013	European U23 Championships	Tampere, Finland	5th	2.24 m
2015	European Indoor Championships	Prague, Czech Republic	22nd (q)	2.14 m
2015	World Championships	Beijing, China	28th (q)	2.22 m
2016	Olympic Games	Rio de Janeiro, Brazil	28th (q)	2.22 m
2017	European Indoor Championships	Belgrade, Serbia	7th	2.27 m
2017	World Championships	London, United Kingdom	5th	2.29 m
2018	World Indoor Championships	Birmingham, United Kingdom	3rd	2.29 m
2018	European Championships	Berlin, Germany	1st	2.35 m
2019	European Indoor Championships	Glasgow, United Kingdom	8th	2.22 m
2019	World Championships	Doha, Qatar	30th (q)	2.17 m
2021	European Indoor Championships	Toruń, Poland	7th	2.19 m
2021	Olympic Games	Tokyo, Japan	23rd (q)	2.21 m
2022	World Championships	Eugene, United States	12th	2.24 m
2022	European Championships	Munich, Germany	6th	2.23 m
2024	European Championships	Rome, Italy	12th	2.17 m
