= Douwe Amels =

Dutch high jumper (born 1991)

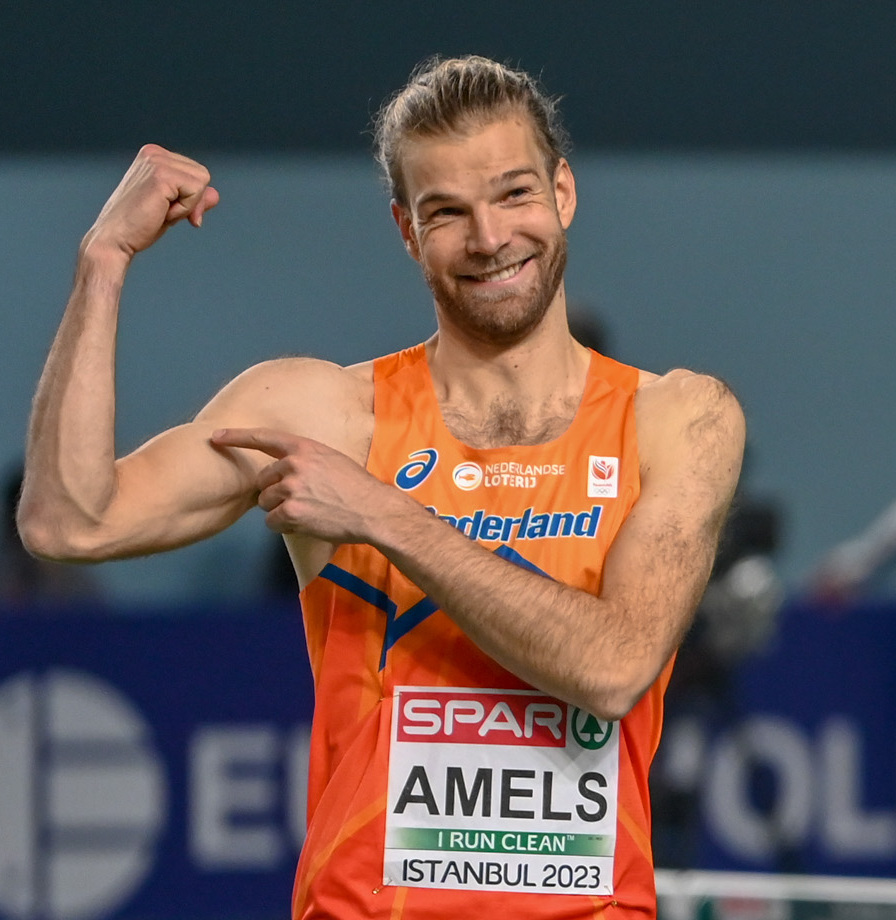
- Amels at the 2023 European Indoor Championships in Istanbul

Personal information
- Born: 16 September 1991 (age 34) Drachten, Netherlands
- Height: 1.95 m (6 ft 5 in)

Sport
- Country: Netherlands
- Sport: Athletics
- Event: High jump
- Coached by: Sierd Wijnalda, Rini van Leeuwen, Marlies Larsen, Hans-Jörg Thomaskamp

Achievements and titles
- Personal bests: 2.28 m (7 ft 5 3/4 in) (Tampere 2013); Indoors; 2.31 m (7 ft 6 3/4 in) =NR (Istanbul 2023)
Medal record
Men's athletics
Representing the Netherlands
European Indoor Championships
Gold medal – first place	2023 Istanbul	High jump
European U23 Championships
Gold medal – first place	2013 Tampere	High jump

Douwe Jorn Amels (Dutch: [ˈdʌu.ə ˈjɔr(ə)n ˈaːməls]; born 16 September 1991) is a Dutch track and field athlete who specialises in the high jump. He won the gold medal at the 2023 European Indoor Championships, becoming the first Dutchman ever to win gold in the event and the first Dutch high jump medallist at these championships since 1977. Amels claimed also gold at the 2013 European Under-23 Championships.

He represented Netherlands at the World Championships in Athletics in 2013 and 2019. He is the joint Dutch indoor record holder for the high jump, and won over 20 national titles (outdoors and indoors).

== Career ==
Born in Drachten, Douwe Amels' family was interested in athletics and joined Impala, a local club, to work with coach Hans-Jörg Thomaskamp.

In 2010, he set a national junior record for the high jump and competed at the World Junior Championships in Athletics held in Moncton, Canada. His first senior national titles followed in 2011 and 2012, when he won both outdoor and indoor titles. Having reached the peak of senior national athletics, he remained in the age category competitions internationally, jumping at the 2011 European Under-23 Championships and then the 2013 European U23 Championships, winning the gold medal at the latter with a personal best jump of 2.28 m (7 ft 5 3/4 in).

Amels was selected to compete for the Netherlands at the 2013 World Championships in Athletics, but at that competition he was some way off his new best, being eliminated in the qualifying rounds with a best jump of 2.17 m (7 ft 1 1/4 in). He failed to improve upon his best in the 2014 and 2015 seasons (jumping 2.23 m and 2.24 m, respectively), though he was also undertaking a degree in corporate law at the Erasmus Universiteit Rotterdam during this period. Amels appeared for the Netherlands at the 2014 European Team Championships Super League, placing ninth, and jumped in the qualifying round of the 2015 Summer Universiade.

He equalled his personal best of 2.28 m in Zoetermeer (NED) on 28 August 2019, qualifying for the 2019 World Championships in Doha, Qatar, where he did not advance to the final.

At the 2023 European Indoor Championships in Istanbul, the 31-year-old equalled Wilbert Pennings' Dutch record of 2.31 m dating back to 2002 to claim the gold medal, the biggest success of his career up to that point. It was the first Dutch title in the men's high jump in history and the first high jump medal for the Netherlands in these championships since Ruud Wielart's bronze in 1977.

In 2025 he ended his professional sports career.

== Statistics ==
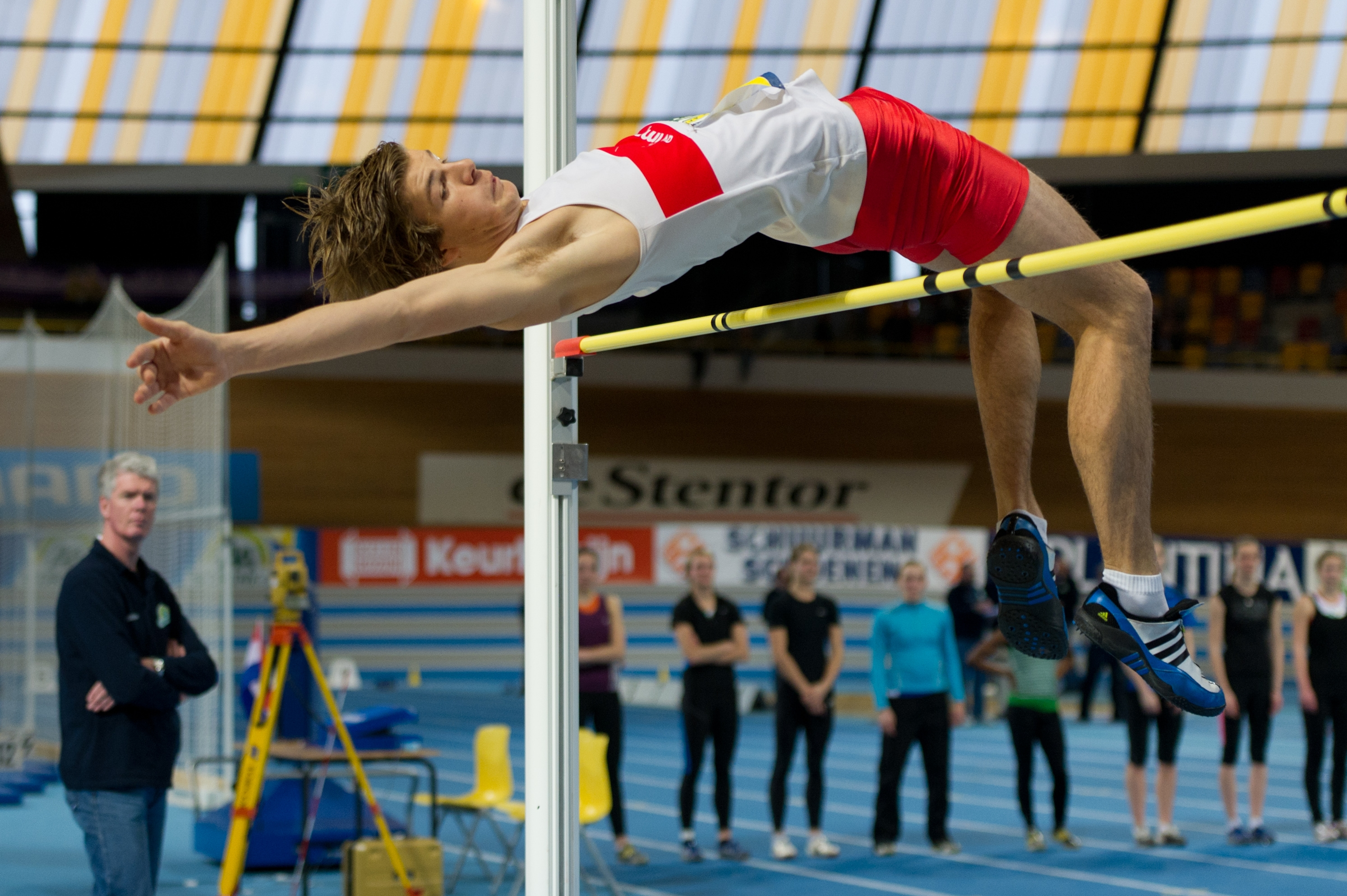
Amels jumps at the 2011 Dutch Indoor Championships in Apeldoorn.

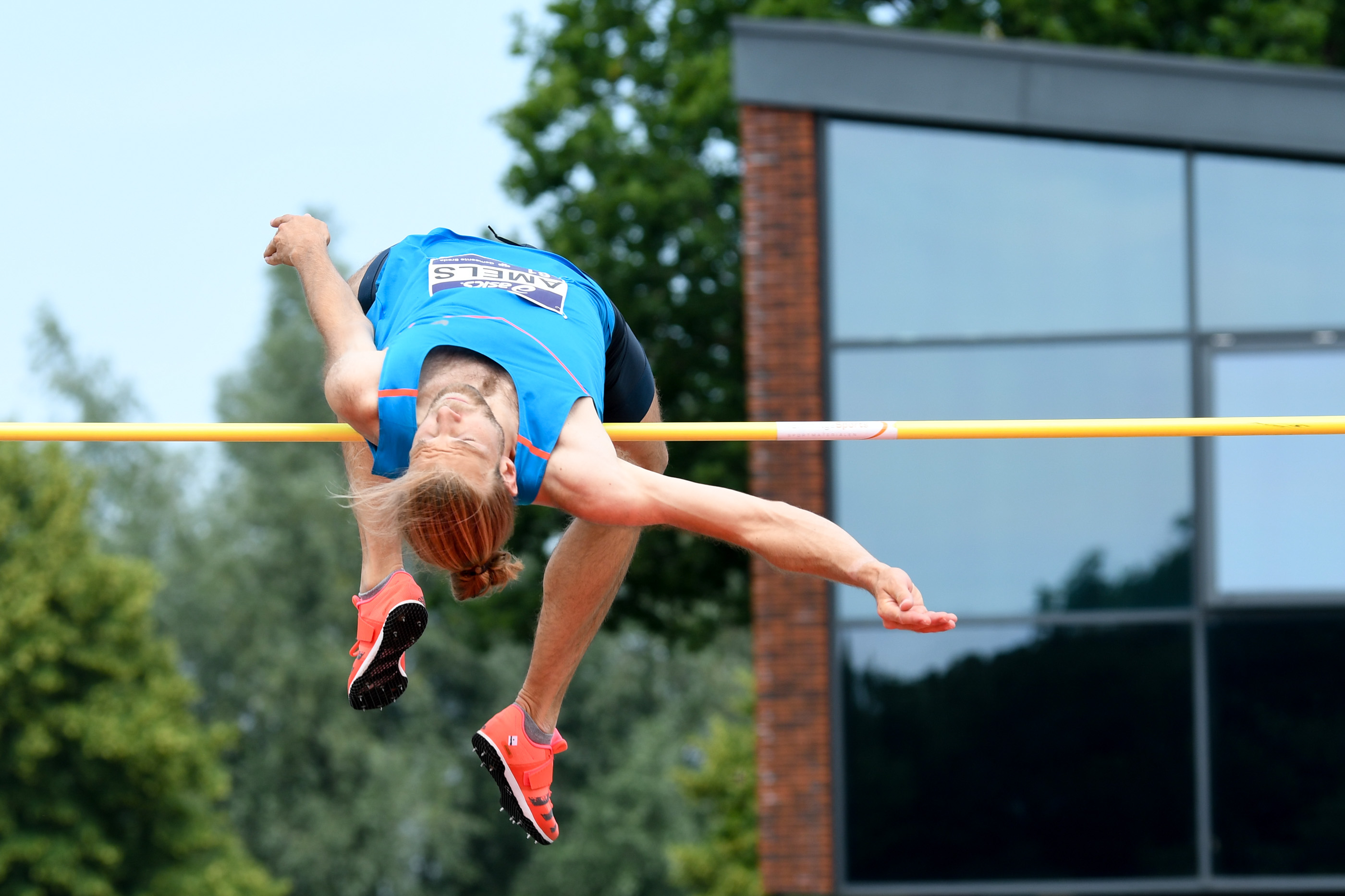
Douwe Amels during the high jump event at the 2021 Dutch Championships in Breda.

=== International competitions ===
Representing the Netherlands
Year	Competition	Venue	Position	Result
2010	World Junior Championships	Moncton, Canada	9th (q)	2.14 m
2011	European U23 Championships	Ostrava, Czech Republic	15th (q)	2.08 m
2013	European U23 Championships	Tampere, Finland	1st	2.28 m PB
2013	World Championships	Moscow, Russia	25th (q)	2.17 m
2014	European Team Championships Super League	Braunschweig, Germany	9th	2.15 m
2015	Universiade	Gwangju, South Korea	14th (q)	2.10 m
2018	European Championships	Berlin, Germany	8th	2.19 m
2019	World Championships	Doha, Qatar	19th (q)	2.22 m
2022	European Championships	Munich, Germany	5th (q)	2.21 m^{1}
2023	European Indoor Championships	Istanbul, Turkey	1st	2.31 m =NR
2023	World Championships	Budapest, Hungary	20th (q)	2.22 m
2024	European Championships	Rome, Italy	11th	2.17 m
2025	European Indoor Championships	Apeldoorn, Netherlands	15th (q)	2.13 m

^{1}No mark in the final

=== National titles ===
- Dutch Athletics Championships
  - High jump: 2011, 2012, 2013, 2014, 2018, 2019, 2020, 2021, 2022, 2023, 2024
- Dutch Indoor Athletics Championships
  - High jump: 2011, 2012, 2014, 2015, 2018, 2020, 2021, 2022, 2023, 2024

== See also ==
- List of high jump national champions (men)
