= Péter Bakosi =

Hungarian high jumper

Péter Bakosi (born 23 June 1993) is a Hungarian high jumper.

He finished eighth at the 2012 World Junior Championships, and fifth at the 2015 European U23 Championships. He also competed at the 2013 European U23 Championships, the 2015 European Indoor Championships and the 2017 European Indoor Championships without reaching the final.

His personal best jump is 2.26 metres, achieved in July 2016 in Miskolc.
