= Allan Smith (high jumper) =

British high jumper

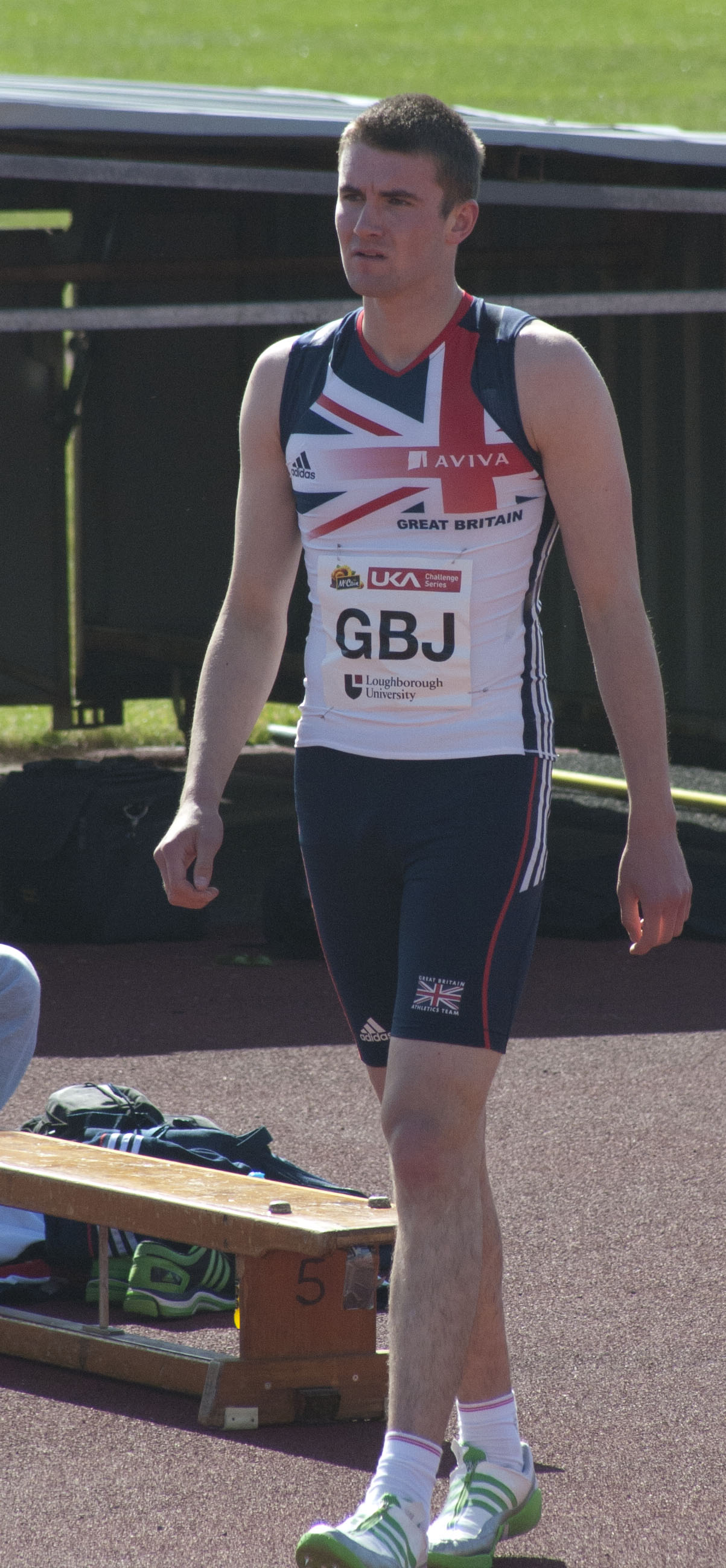
- Smith at the Loughborough International Athletics meeting

Personal information
- Nationality: British (Scottish)
- Born: 6 November 1992 (age 33) Paisley, Scotland
- Height: 2.00 m (6 ft 6 1/2 in)

Sport
- Sport: Athletics
- Event: High jump
- Club: Shaftesbury Barnet Harriers
- Coached by: Bryan Roy
Medal record
Men's athletics
Representing Great Britain
European Athletics U23 Championships
Bronze medal – third place	Tampere 2013	High jump

Allan Smith (born 6 November 1992) is a former high jumper from Scotland who competed at the Commonwealth Games.

== Biography ==
Smith first came to prominence in 2011, when capturing all four of the Great Britain & Ireland under 20 men national indoor championship titles. During that indoor season he also won the Welsh senior indoor title and set a championship best performance in the Scottish Athletics indoor league, placing him at the top of the UK junior men rankings for 2011.

In 2012, he won the Scottish National Open and was runner-up in the Amateur Athletic Association of England (AAA) Under 23 Championship.

During the 2013 indoor season, Smith won the Scottish Universities title, Scottish Seniors title and was runner up in the UK Senior Indoor Championships. During the outdoor season he won a bronze medal at the European U23 Athletics Championships in Tampere, Finland, clearing a personal best height of 2.26m. At the end of the 2013 season Smith received the "Scottish Sports Aid Junior Sportsperson of the Year Award 2013".

In 2014 he won both England Athletics U23 and 2014 British Athletics Championships titles. In February 2015 he continued his domestic winning streak by capturing the Scottish Athletics indoor title and then followed it up by winning the British Athletics Indoor title with a new pb of 2.29m.

During his career Smith accumulated many high jump records at various levels; including the Scottish Native Record; Scottish Universities and Colleges; Scottish Schools; Scottish Athletics Indoor League, Scottish Athletics Under 20 Men and the Shaftesbury Barnet club record. Of particular note is the Scottish Native Record of 2.22m which he set in January 2013 whilst competing at the Scottish Universities and College Championships in Glasgow. Two weeks later he raised the Scottish native record to 2.23m, a mark set at the British International Match in Glasgow as he represented the Commonwealth Select team.

In 2017 Allan was selected to represent Great Britain at the European Indoor Championships and the World University Games; and by Scotland for the Loughborough and Manchester Internationals. In 2018, Smith jumped 2.27m at the Commonwealth Games in Australia, narrowly missing a medal and finishing 5th overall. He also won the BUCS outdoor high jump title as a first time participant. In 2019, he won both the Scottish national title and a second British Athletics Championships title.

In May 2021 he announced his retirement.

== Achievements ==
Year	Competition	Venue	Position	Result	Notes
Representing Edinburgh Napier University
2018	British Universities and Colleges (BUCS) Athletics Championship	Bedford, UK	1st	2.18 m	
Representing Great Britain Juniors
2013	Loughborough International	Loughborough, UK	2nd	2.22 m	
Representing Commonwealth Select
2013	Glasgow International Match	Emirates Arena, UK	4th	2.23 m	
Representing Club - Shaftesbury Barnet
2019	British Athletics UK Championships and World Trials	Birmingham, England	1st	2.25 m	
2017	British Athletics UK Indoor Championships and European Trials	Sheffield, England	1st	2.25 m	
2015	British Athletics UK Indoor Championships and European Trials	Sheffield, England	1st	2.29 m	
2014	British Athletics UK Championships and European Trials	Birmingham, England	1st	2.24 m	
Representing GB & NI team
2013	European Athletics Under23 Championships	Tampere, Finland	3rd	2.26 m	
2017	2017 Summer Universiade	Taipei, Taiwan	4th	2.23 m	
Representing Team Scotland
2018	2018 Commonwealth Games	Gold Coast, Queensland, Australia	5th	2.27 m	
2018	Loughborough International	Loughborough, UK	1st	2.23 m	
