= Sergey Mudrov =

Russian high jumper

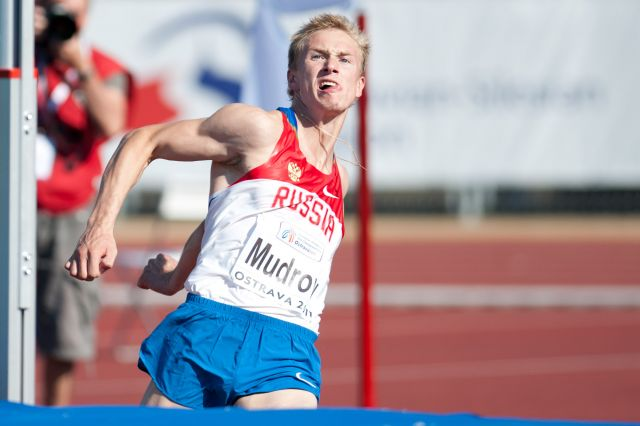
- Sergey Mudrov in 2011

Medal record

Representing Russia

Men's athletics

European Indoor Championships
Gold medal – first place	2013 Gothenburg	High jump

European U23 Championships
Silver medal – second place	2011 Ostrava	High jump

Universiade
Gold medal – first place	2013 Kazan	High jump
Bronze medal – third place	2011 Shenzhen	High jump

European Junior Championships
Gold medal – first place	2009 Novi Sad	High jump

World Youth Championships
Silver medal – second place	2007 Ostrava	High jump

Sergey Mudrov (born 8 September 1990) is a Russian high jumper.

== Biography ==
As a teenager he won the silver medal at the 2007 World Youth Championships, finished fourth at the 2008 World Junior Championships and the gold medal at the 2009 European Junior Championships.

He later competed at the 2011 European Indoor Championships without reaching the final, won the silver medal at the 2011 European U23 Championships and the bronze medal at the 2011 Universiade. His personal best jump was 2.30 metres, achieved in July 2011 in Ostrava. He has achieved 2.31 metres outdoors, a mark set in April 2011 in Des Moines.

In 2013, he won the gold medal at the 2013 European Athletics Indoor Championships, jumping a new personal best of 2.35 metres and beating compatriot Aleksey Dmitrik.

== Achievements ==
Year	Competition	Venue	Position	Notes
Representing Russia
2007	World Youth Championships	Ostrava, Czech Republic	2nd	2.22 m
2007	European Youth Olympics	Belgrade, Serbia	1st	2.20 m
2008	World Junior Championships	Bydgoszcz, Poland	4th	2.17 m
2009	European Junior Championships	Novi Sad, Serbia	1st	2.25 m
2011	European U23 Championships	Ostrava, Czech Republic	2nd	2.30 m
2011	Summer Universiade	Shenzhen, China	3rd	2.24 m
2012	European Championships	Helsinki, Finland	4th	2.28 m
2013	European Indoor Championships	Gothenburg, Sweden	1st	2.35 m
2013	Summer Universiade	Kazan, Russia	1st	2.31 m
