= Yuriy Krymarenko =

Ukrainian high jumper

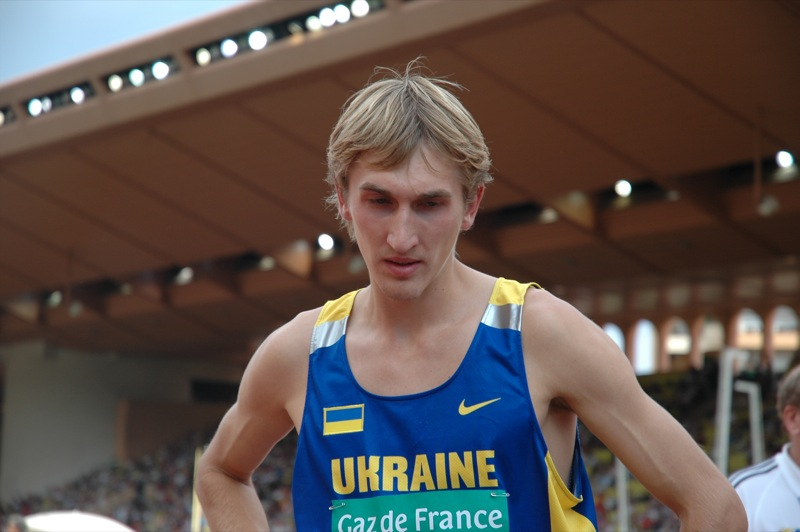
- Krymarenko in 2005

Personal information
- Native name: Юрій Олександрович Кримаренко
- Full name: Yuriy Oleksandrovych Krymarenko
- Born: 11 August 1983 (age 42) Berdychiv, Zhytomyr Oblast, Ukrainian SSR, Soviet Union
Medal record
Representing Ukraine
Men's athletics
World Championships
Gold medal – first place	2005 Helsinki	High jump
Military World Games
Gold medal – first place	2003 Catania	High jump
Silver medal – second place	2011 Rio de Janeiro	High jump
European Team Championships
Gold medal – first place	2009 Leiria	High jump
European U23 Championships
Bronze medal – third place	2005 Erfurt	High jump

Yuriy Oleksandrovych Krymarenko (Ukrainian: Юрій Олександрович Кримаренко; born August 11, 1983) is a Ukrainian high jumper. His personal best performance is 2.33 m.

== Career ==
Krymarenko won a gold medal in the 2005 World Championships in Athletics, clearing the height of 2.32 m which was the lowest winning result for men's high jump since 1983. The favorites of the contest, most notably Swede Stefan Holm, failed to jump over more than 2.29 m. Krymarenko had started the 2005 season with a silver medal in the European Under 23 Championships in Erfurt, Germany, where he was beaten by the Czech Republic's Jaroslav Bába.

He finished 33rd in the 2008 Summer Olympics with a jump of 2.15 m.

== Competition record ==
Year	Competition	Venue	Position	Notes
Representing Ukraine
2005	European U23 Championships	Erfurt, Germany	3rd	2.27 m
2005	World Championships	Helsinki, Finland	1st	2.32 m
2005	Universiade	İzmir, Turkey	6th	2.20 m
2007	World Championships	Osaka, Japan	21st (q)	2.26 m
2008	Olympic Games	Beijing, China	33rd (q)	2.15 m
2009	World Championships	Berlin, Germany	18th (q)	2.24 m
2010	World Indoor Championships	Doha, Qatar	9th (q)	2.26 m
2013	European Indoor Championships	Gothenburg, Sweden	11th (q)	2.23 m
2013	World Championships	Moscow, Russia	19th (q)	2.22 m
2014	European Championships	Zürich, Switzerland	6th	2.26 m
2015	European Indoor Championships	Prague, Czech Republic	14th (q)	2.24 m
2015	World Championships	Beijing, China	28th (q)	2.22 m
2016	European Championships	Amsterdam, Netherlands	18th (q)	2.23 m
