= Robbie Grabarz =

British high jumper (born 1987)

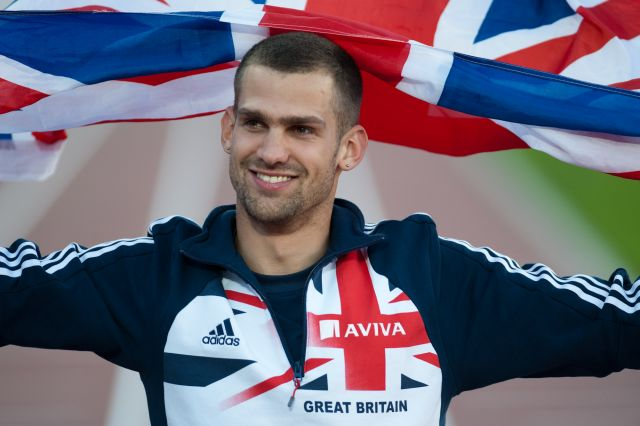
- Grabarz at the 2012 European Athletics Championships in Helsinki

Personal information
- Nationality: British
- Born: 3 October 1987 (age 39) Enfield, Greater London, England
- Height: 1.91 m (6 ft 3 in)
- Weight: 80 kg (180 lb; 12 st 8 lb)

Sport
- Sport: Athletics
- Event: High jump
Medal record
Men's athletics
Representing Great Britain
Olympic Games
Silver medal – second place	2012 London	High jump
World Indoor Championships
Silver medal – second place	2016 Portland	High jump
Diamond League
Gold medal – first place	2014	High jump
European Championships
Gold medal – first place	2012 Helsinki	High jump
Silver medal – second place	2016 Amsterdam	High jump
European Indoor Championships
Silver medal – second place	2017 Belgrade	High jump

Robert Karl Grabarz (born 3 October 1987) is a retired British high jumper. Active during the 2010s, with his greatest success coming in two periods between 2012 and 2017. He was the 2012 European champion, the 2012 Diamond League high jump champion and won a shared silver medal in the 2012 Summer Olympics, which was upgraded from bronze after disqualification of the original winner, Ivan Ukhov of Russia, for doping in 2021.

He failed to figure at the sharp end internationally in 2014 and 2015, but between 2016 and 2017 Grabarz had a significant return to form, as he won World and European silver medals indoors, and European outdoors silver as well as finishing 4th at the 2016 Summer Olympics.and 6th at the 2017 World Championships. Domestically, Grabarz was a five-time British champion between 2012 and 2017.

Following a troubled start to his 2018 season, Grabarz announced his immediate representative retirement at the age of 30.

== Personal life ==
Grabarz was born in Enfield, England. His grandfather, Ernst Karl Grabarz (1934–2001), emigrated to England from Poland. Robbie attended Crosshall Junior School and Longsands College in St Neots, Cambridgeshire, and started a foundation degree programme with Loughborough College in 2006.

== Career ==
Grabarz finished twelfth at the 2006 World Junior Championships and competed at the 2011 European Indoor Championships, finishing 23rd and failing to reach the final. Grabarz subsequently failed to qualify for the 2011 World Championships in Athletics and lost his National Lottery funding.

After this string of poor performances and funding loss, Grabarz "realised I didn't want that disappointment to happen again and I realised it was my decision to make it not happen again." He moved to Birmingham to train and "make a fresh start so I could give 100% of what I have to offer." He secured financial help from the Ron Pickering Memorial Fund and BackleyBlack, the company run by former athletes Steve Backley and Roger Black. His coach Fuzz Ahmed commented: "If I hadn't found him backing and if he didn't have a credit card, I would have funded him, because that's how much I believed in him. I recognised he had matured into a person that wanted to be a world class high jumper, rather than somebody who was just a very good high jumper."

2012 saw a much improved Grabarz. In January 2012 he made his international breakthrough by jumping 2.34 metres at an indoor high jump gala in Wuppertal. His previous best was 2.28m and the jump saw him pass the Olympic 'A' qualifying standard. In June, Grabarz won gold at the European Athletics Championships with a jump of 2.31m. He followed this up at the 2012 London Olympics in August, by clearing 2.29 metres in the final to win bronze, in a three-way tie with Canada's Derek Drouin and Qatar's Mutaz Essa Barshim. After victories in the Rome and Birmingham Diamond League events, Grabarz took the overall 2012 IAAF Diamond League high jump crown, winning the Diamond Trophy and $40,000 prize money.

His personal-best jump is 2.37 metres, a mark set at the Lausanne Diamond League meeting on 23 August 2012, equalling the British men's outdoor record held by Steve Smith since 1992.

Grabarz finished joint fourth at the 2016 Olympics. He cleared a season's-best height of 2.33 metres, the same height as bronze medallist Bohdan Bondarenko, at the first attempt but earlier in the competition he had failed at his first attempt at 2.25 metres, meaning that Bondarenko won the bronze on countback.

In May 2018 he announced his retirement, saying that he doesn't enjoy competition anymore.

In 2019, Ukhov was stripped of the gold medal by the Court of Arbitration in Sport for doping offences. As a result, two years later, Grabarz was upgraded to the silver medal position, along with Drouin and Barshim. The USA's Erik Kynard, the original silver medallist, was promoted to gold.

== International competitions ==
Year	Competition	Venue	Position	Notes
Representing Great Britain
2005	European Junior Championships	Kaunas, Lithuania	18th (q)	2.05 m
2006	World Junior Championships	Beijing, China	12th	2.05 m
2009	European U23 Championships	Kaunas, Lithuania	11th	2.18 m
2011	European Indoor Championships	Paris, France	23rd (q)	2.12 m
2012	World Indoor Championships	Istanbul, Turkey	6th	2.31 m
2012	European Championships	Helsinki, Finland	1st	2.31 m
2012	Olympic Games	London, United Kingdom	2nd	2.29 m
2013	European Indoor Championships	Gothenburg, Sweden	6th	2.23 m
2013	World Championships	Moscow, Russia	8th	2.29 m
2014	World Indoor Championships	Sopot, Poland	11th (q)	2.25 m
2015	World Championships	Beijing, China	18th (q)	2.26 m
2016	World Indoor Championships	Portland, Oregon, United States	2nd	2.33 m
2016	European Championships	Amsterdam, Netherlands	2nd	2.29 m
2016	Olympic Games	Rio de Janeiro, Brazil	4th	2.33 m
2017	European Indoor Championships	Belgrade, Serbia	2nd	2.30 m
2017	World Championships	London, United Kingdom	6th	2.25 m
2018	World Indoor Championships	Birmingham, United Kingdom	9th	2.20 m
2018	Commonwealth Games	Gold Coast, Australia	12th	2.18 m

=== Diamond League wins ===
- 2012 - Rome & Birmingham
- Won the 2012 Overall Diamond Race High Jump title
