= Derek Drouin =

Canadian track and field athlete

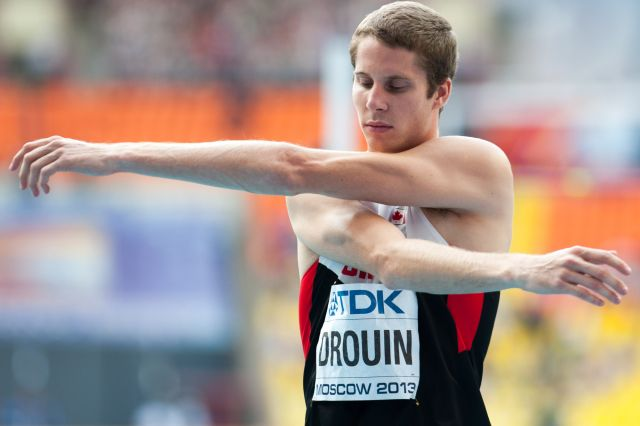
- Drouin at the 2013 World Championships

Personal information
- Nationality: Canada
- Born: March 6, 1990 (age 36) Sarnia, Ontario, Canada
- Home town: Corunna, Ontario, Canada
- Height: 194 cm (6 ft 4 in)
- Weight: 80 kg (176 lb)

Sport
- Sport: Track and field
- Event: High jump
- College team: Indiana Hoosiers

Achievements and titles
- Personal bests: High jump: 2.40 m (7 ft 10 1/4 in) NR (Des Moines 2014); Decathlon: 7,150 (Santa Barbara 2017)
Medal record
Event	1st	2nd	3rd
Olympic Games	1	1	0
World Championships	1	0	1
Commonwealth Games	1	0	0
Pan American Games	1	0	0
Jeux de la Francophonie	1	0	0
IAAF Continental Cup	0	0	1
Total	5	1	2
Representing Canada
Olympic Games
Gold medal – first place	2016 Rio de Janeiro	High jump
Silver medal – second place	2012 London	High jump
World Championships
Gold medal – first place	2015 Beijing	High jump
Bronze medal – third place	2013 Moscow	High jump
Commonwealth Games
Gold medal – first place	2014 Glasgow	High jump
Pan American Games
Gold medal – first place	2015 Toronto	High jump
Jeux de la Francophonie
Gold medal – first place	2013 Nice	High jump
Continental Cup
Bronze medal – third place	2014 Marrakesh	High jump

Derek Drouin (born March 6, 1990) is a Canadian retired track and field athlete who competes in the high jump. He won gold at the 2016 Summer Olympics, and was the 2015 World Champion. He also won gold at the 2014 Commonwealth Games and the 2015 Pan American Games, and won a silver medal at the 2012 Summer Olympics and a bronze medal at the 2013 World Championships. Drouin was originally awarded the bronze at the 2012 Olympics which was retroactively changed to silver when the original gold medallist Ivan Ukhov was stripped of his medal for doping violations. He was belatedly presented with the upgraded silver in a presentation during the 2024 Paris Summer Olympics, one of 10 Olympians who were presented with “reallocated” medals from previous Olympics. He holds both the world decathlon best and the world heptathlon best in the high jump with clearances of 2.28 m (7 ft 5 3/4 in) and 2.30 m (7 ft 6 1/2 in), respectively.

Drouin's personal best jump of 2.40 m (7 ft 10 1/4 in), set in 2014, is the Canadian record and ranks him joint eighth on the overall list. In his college career, he was a five-time NCAA Champion in the high jump for the Indiana Hoosiers.

== Career ==
Drouin first learned to high jump in kindergarten in Corunna, Ontario when his teacher introduced the sport to the class. After the lesson, Drouin went home and put a broom over two speakers and started leaping over it. He first achieved international success when he won the 2009 Pan American Junior Championships in high jump for Canada, clearing 2.27 m. He would continue on in his career competing in the NCAA with the Indiana Hoosiers track team where he would be the first Hoosier athlete to win an NCAA championship in high jump. Prior to the 2012 season Drouin had never competed at any senior level World Championships. Drouin won the Big Ten Athlete of the Year in 2013, after becoming the first athlete in NCAA history to win 5 NCAA championships in the high jump.

He competed in the high jump event at the 2012 Summer Olympics after winning the Canadian national championships with a 2.31 to edge out compatriot Michael Mason who also competed in London. Drouin was almost unable to get to the point where he could compete at the Olympics, having torn three ligaments in his foot in 2011 after jumping in a meet in Mississippi State and only returned to competition in April 2012. In two Diamond League meets in London and Monaco before the Olympics, Drouin won and finished third with a 2.26 and 2.30 for each respective meet. Drouin initially won the bronze medal at the 2012 Summer Olympics in London, England with a jump of 2.29 metres. This was Canada's first medal in high jump since the 1976 Summer Olympics in Montreal when Greg Joy medalled for Canada. His medal was retroactively upgraded to silver in 2021 when the original winner Ukhov of the event was disqualified.

2013 World Championships

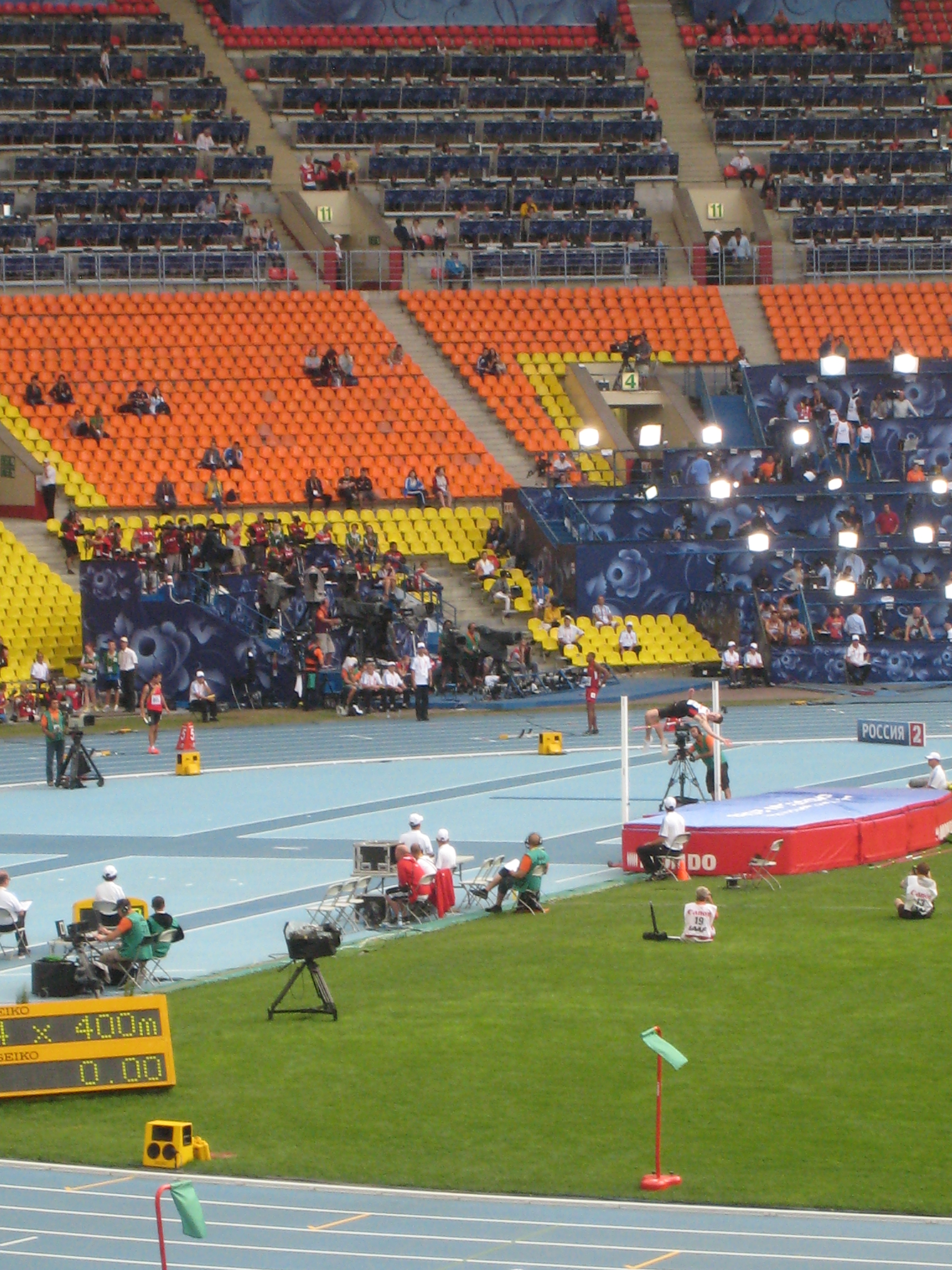
Drouin jumping at the 2013 World Championships in Moscow

The 2013 World Championships in Athletics that took place in Moscow was the next major global competition for Drouin. At these games he again found himself in the bronze competition with a personal best and a national record 2.38 m, but was unable to achieve 2.41 m. In contrast to London he stood in third place with Mutaz Barshim in second and the 2013 world leader Bohdan Bondarenko winning the gold. Drouin had a lot to say of the moment but felt he could achieve more: "I wanted to prove this year that I deserved to be on the podium in London 2012, feels good to have accomplished that goal. I was joking after that I never thought I would only place third jumping 2.38 metres, I'm certainly not disappointed, it was an incredible competition. I felt like 2.41 metres was attainable but it's always emotional when you set a personal best, getting another one in the same competition was a daunting task. That height is definitely a realistic goal for me now."

One month after the Worlds, Drouin won his first major international title at the 7th edition of the Francophone Games held in Nice, France on Saturday September 14, 2013. Three men cleared 2.30m in the high jump, but victory went to Drouin as he went over on his first attempt, while France's Mickaël Hanany and Romania's 2009 Francophone Games champion Mihai Donisan needed three attempts each at that height.

As a result of his record-breaking season, Drouin won three major awards from Athletics Canada. He was awarded the Jack W. Davies Trophy as outstanding athlete of the year, plus the F.N.A. Rowell Trophy as athlete of the year in field events, and the Cal D. Bricker Memorial Trophy for outstanding performance of the year.

2014

Building on his new breakthroughs, the following outdoor season saw Drouin reach new heights when he bettered his Canadian record jumping 2.40 at the 2014 Drake Relays event in Des Moines, United States. In that Friday evening competition on April 25, he cleared the first 8 heights – each on his first attempt – winning at 2.38m; Americans Erik Kynard and Dusty Jonas both cleared 2.35m and were second and third respectively. Drouin then cleared 2.40 on his third attempt for a new Canadian record (and did not attempt to jump higher). Drouin was proud of reaching what he deemed a prestigious height, saying, "That is a huge barrier distance, I think, for any elite high jumper. It's kind of like the first time making two metres, or seven foot being an elusive seven-foot club. Two-forty has only been cleared by a handful of people ever, so as a high jumper I think I've sort of coined that as my lifetime goal." As a result of the jump, Drouin became just the tenth man in the world to jump 2.40 or higher outdoors, while five others have done it indoors.

Drouin went to the 2014 Commonwealth Games in July, there he won the gold medal with a jump of 2.31 m, while he failed to clear a jump of 2.37 on his next attempts at trying to set the Commonwealth Games record. Teammate Michael Mason finished behind Drouin in the bronze medal position.

2015 Pan Am and world champion

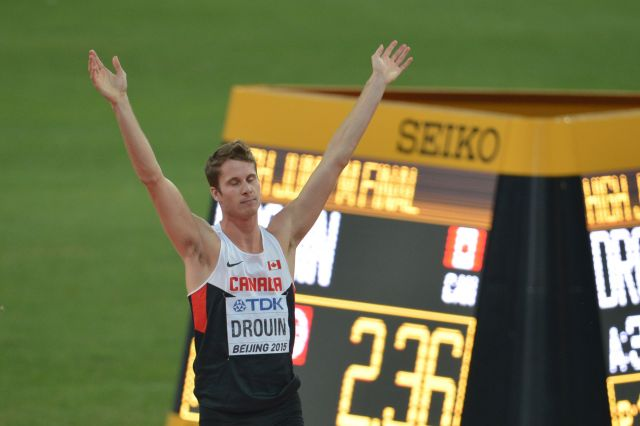
Derek Drouin at the 2015 World Championships in Athletics in Beijing

The 2015 came with two big events for Drouin, the 2015 Pan American Games in Toronto followed by the 2015 World Championships in Athletics a few weeks later. In his hometown Pan Am Games in Toronto, Drouin won gold with teammate Mason again grabbing silver in a duplicate result from the Commonwealth Games. After the win Drouin said "My last two meets were season bests also, so I was carrying in some confidence. I knew that being in Toronto and being in front of the crowd like this would be great, so I'm glad I didn't let that go to waste. Canada winning gold and silver, it can't get much better than that. Non-verbally, because I didn't want to jinx it, I was hoping Mike and I would be the top two spots."

At the 2015 World Championships in Athletics Drouin found himself in the finals in a four-way jumpoff after they all cleared 2.33 m but could not make 2.36 m. Drouin managed to make the 2.34 m on his first try while his opponents all faltered, thus securing his world title. After winning he said, "It's funny because a few months ago I was just so frustrated with the season. I went about a month and a half without clearing 2.30m, playing with a new approach and trying to peak at the end of the season. I got to the point where I just wanted the season to be done and forget about world championships. Luckily, I was patient and things finally worked out and things clicked and when they clicked they really clicked. I felt like I was in a really good place coming into here."

2016 Olympic gold

At the 2016 Summer Olympics in Rio de Janeiro, Drouin jumped a season best height of 2.38 metres to win the gold medal, defeating Barshim and Bondarenko. Drouin cleared every height on his first attempt, until he missed at 2.40 while going for the Olympic record. It was the second medal won by a Canadian male athlete, the first gold medal for a Canadian male, and Canada's third gold medal overall during the Rio de Janeiro games. Drouin was the first Canadian to win a gold medal in a field sport since Duncan McNaughton, who also won the high jump at the 1932 Summer Olympics in Los Angeles. Of the historic gold, Drouin said, "We've had a pretty good tradition in high jump, so myself and my teammates are just trying to keep re-writing it. It doesn't matter that I was world champion coming in today. In my eyes, everyone was on even playing ground right from the start. The pressure that maybe other people felt for me I certainly wasn't internalizing."

Drouin is noted for a slightly different technique than most of his contemporary opponents. His approach involves him going slower and bounding toward the bar rather than running at it with pace as his opponents do. This allows him to keep his plant leg stiff, if the leg bends he'll lose the energy he needs in his leg for the jump. Drouin commented on the technique to The New York Times saying, "You see, jumpers try to run as fast as they can, and then they put their foot down and their leg isn't able to handle it. So they just end up blowing through the bar."

Post-Rio de Janeiro

Following the 2016 Rio de Janeiro Olympics, Drouin began training for decathlons with the goal of making the 2018 Commonwealth Games team in the multi-event. Drouin said of the professional event change that "it's to get back to what I was doing in college, which was really when I was most confident competing, I kind of felt my strongest, felt like I was in my best physical shape, and I just have a whole lot of fun doing that. It's something I really haven't done in a while, but I'm very excited to get back into that. I was always a pretty strong hurdler in college. I really love throwing javelin. I was always competitive in multis in college and I loved it." On April 7, 2017, at the Sam Adam Multi Event meet in Montecito, California, he set the world decathlon best in the high jump at 2.28 m (7 ft 5 3/4 in). His jump and decathlon performance improved upon a record that had stood since 1977. He did add that he still intends to compete in the high jump at the 2017 IAAF World Championships in London to defend his world title. Plagued by injury problems prior to the 2017 World Championships, Drouin still hoped to compete in the pinnacle championship of the year. Unfortunately the injury to his achilles tendon forced him, like fellow Canadian and medal favourite Andre De Grasse, to miss the championships.

=== Post-career ===
He retired from athletic competition in 2021 and now works with the Canadian Olympic Committee as a program manager in Athletic Marketing and Olympic Legacy within the organization.

== Personal life ==
Drouin was born in Sarnia, Ontario, to Sheila (née Teschke) and Gaetan Drouin. He grew up in Corunna, Ontario, a small community in the St. Clair Township. He has two sisters, Jillian and Alysha. Jillian was also an international competitor for Canada in the heptathlon, competing at the World Youth Championships, Commonwealth Games, and Pan American Games.

== Honours ==
In 2012, Drouin was awarded the Queen Elizabeth II Diamond Jubilee Medal.

== National titles ==
- Canadian Track and Field Championships
  - High jump: 2010, 2012, 2013, 2014, 2015
- NCAA Men's Outdoor Track and Field Championships
  - High jump: 2010, 2013
- NCAA Men's Indoor Track and Field Championships
  - High jump: 2010, 2011, 2013

== Personal bests ==
Outdoor

Individual events
Event	Performance	Location	Date	Ref.
Long jump	6.51 m (21 ft 4 1/4 in) (+1.9 m/s)	Sydney	March 18, 2017	
High jump	2.40 m (7 ft 10 1/4 in) NR	Des Moines	April 25, 2014	
110 metres hurdles	14.04 (+1.5 m/s)	Louisville	April 13, 2013	
110 metres hurdles	13.87 (+2.5 m/s)	Bloomington	May 3, 2013	
400 metres hurdles	56.30	Louisville	April 14, 2012	
Javelin throw	57.65 m (189 ft 1 1/2 in)	Gainesville	April 5, 2013	

Combined events
Event	Performance	Location	Date	Score	Ref.
Decathlon	—N/a	Santa Barbara	April 7–8, 2017	7,150 points	
100 metres	11.42	Santa Barbara	April 7, 2017	769 points	
Long jump	6.78 m (22 ft 2 3/4 in) (+1.1 m/s)	Tuscaloosa	March 28, 2010	762 points	
Shot put	12.10 m (39 ft 8 1/4 in)	Santa Barbara	April 7, 2017	612 points	
High jump	2.28 m (7 ft 5 3/4 in)^{[a]}	Santa Barbara	April 7, 2017	1,071 points	
400 metres	51.81	Santa Barbara	April 7, 2017	733 points	
110 metres hurdles	14.47	Santa Barbara	April 8, 2017	915 points	
Discus throw	34.85 m (114 ft 4 in)	Santa Barbara	April 8, 2017	561 points	
Pole vault	3.80 m (12 ft 5 1/2 in)	Santa Barbara	April 8, 2017	562 points	
Javelin throw	52.33 m (171 ft 8 in)	Tuscaloosa	March 28, 2010	623 points	
1500 metres	4:54.51	Santa Barbara	April 8, 2017	592 points	
Virtual Best Performance				7,200 points	—N/a

^{a} Decathlon best

Indoor

Individual events
Event	Performance	Location	Date
Long jump	7.13 m (23 ft 4 1/2 in)	Bloomington	January 12, 2013
High jump	2.35 m (7 ft 8 1/2 in) NR	Fayetteville	March 9, 2013
60 metres hurdles	8.00	Champaign	February 26, 2011

Combined events
Event	Performance	Location	Date	Score
Heptathlon	—N/a	Geneva, Ohio	February 22–23, 2013	5,817 points
60 metres	7.25	Geneva, Ohio	February 22, 2013	796 points
Long jump	7.20 m (23 ft 7 1/4 in)	Geneva, Ohio	February 22, 2013	862 points
Shot put	12.28 m (40 ft 3 1/4 in)	Geneva, Ohio	February 4, 2011	623 points
High jump	2.30 m (7 ft 6 1/2 in)^{[b]}	Geneva, Ohio	February 22, 2013	1,091 points
60 metres hurdles	7.98	Bloomington	December 7, 2012	987 points
Pole vault	4.15 m (13 ft 7 1/4 in)	Geneva, Ohio	February 23, 2013	659 points
1000 metres	2:45.06	Geneva, Ohio	February 23, 2013	818 points
Virtual Best Performance				5,836 points

^{b} Heptathlon best

== International competitions ==
Year	Competition	Venue	Position	Notes
Representing Canada
2007	World Youth Championships	Ostrava, Czech Republic	10th	2.04
2008	Commonwealth Youth Games	Pune, India	3rd	2.09
2009	Pan American Junior Championships	Port of Spain, Trinidad and Tobago	1st	2.27
2012	Olympic Games	London, United Kingdom	2nd	2.29
2013	World Championships	Moscow, Russia	3rd	2.38 NR
2013	Francophonie Games	Nice, France	1st	2.30
2014	Commonwealth Games	Glasgow, Scotland	1st	2.31
2014	IAAF Continental Cup	Marrakesh, Morocco	3rd	2.31
2015	Pan American Games	Toronto, Canada	1st	2.37
2015	World Championships	Beijing, China	1st	2.34
2016	Olympic Games	Rio de Janeiro, Brazil	1st	2.38

Awards
Preceded by Cam Levins	The Bowerman (men's winner); 2013	Succeeded by Deon Lendore
