= 2016 European Athletics Championships – Men's high jump =

Men's high jump at the European Athletics Championships
- Venue: Olympic Stadium
- Location: Amsterdam
- Dates: 9 July (qualification); 10 July (final)
- Competitors: 23 from 16 nations
- Winning height: 2.32 m

Medalists
gold medal	Gianmarco Tamberi	Italy
silver medal	Robbie Grabarz	Great Britain
bronze medal	Chris Baker	Great Britain
bronze medal	Eike Onnen	Germany

The men's high jump at the 2016 European Athletics Championships took place at the Olympic Stadium on 9 and 10 July.

== Records ==
Standing records prior to the 2016 European Athletics Championships
World record	Javier Sotomayor (CUB)	2.45 m	Salamanca, Spain	27 July 1993
European record	Patrik Sjöberg (SWE)	2.42 m	Stockholm, Sweden	30 June 1987
European record	Bohdan Bondarenko (UKR)	2.42 m	New York City, United States	14 June 2014
Championship record	Andrey Silnov (RUS)	2.36 m	Gothenburg, Sweden	9 August 2006
World Leading	Mutaz Essa Barshim (QAT)	2.40 m	Opole, Poland	11 June 2016
European Leading	Gianmarco Tamberi (ITA)	2.36 m	Rieti, Italy	26 June 2016

== Schedule ==
Date	Time	Round
9 July 2016	14:10	Qualifying
10 July 2016	17:00	Final

All times are local times (UTC+2)

== Results ==
=== Qualification ===
Qualification: 2.25 m (Q) or best 12 performances (q)

Rank	Group	Name	Nationality	2.09	2.14	2.19	2.23	2.25	Result	Notes
1	A	Miguel Ángel Sancho	Spain	o	o	o	o	o	2.25	Q, SB
1	A	Eike Onnen	Germany	–	o	o	o	o	2.25	Q
1	A	Robbie Grabarz	Great Britain	–	–	o	o	o	2.25	Q
1	B	Chris Baker	Great Britain	–	o	o	o	o	2.25	Q
1	B	Gianmarco Tamberi	Italy	–	–	o	o	o	2.25	Q
6	A	Jaroslav Bába	Czech Republic	–	o	xo	o	o	2.25	Q
6	A	Dimitrios Hondrokoukis	Cyprus	–	xo	o	o	o	2.25	Q, =SB
8	A	Vasilios Constantinou	Cyprus	–	xo	o	xo	o	2.25	Q, =SB
9	B	Andriy Protsenko	Ukraine	o	o	o	xxo	xo	2.25	Q
10	B	Kyriakos Ioannou	Cyprus	–	–	o	o	xxo	2.25	Q
10	B	Tihomir Ivanov	Bulgaria	–	o	o	o	xxo	2.25	Q
12	A	Konstadinos Baniotis	Greece	–	xo	o	o	xxo	2.25	Q
13	A	Dmitriy Kroyter	Israel	o	o	o	o	xxx	2.23	=SB
13	A	Eugenio Rossi	San Marino	–	–	o	o	xxx	2.23	
15	B	Matúš Bubeník	Slovakia	o	o	o	xo	xxx	2.23	
16	B	Sylwester Bednarek	Poland	–	o	xo	xo	xxx	2.23	
17	A	Raivydas Stanys	Lithuania	o	o	o	xxo	xxx	2.23	
18	A	Yuriy Krymarenko	Ukraine	o	xo	o	xxo	xxx	2.23	
19	A	Pavel Seliverstau	Belarus	–	o	o	xxx		2.19	
19	B	Simón Siverio	Spain	o	o	o	xx–	x	2.19	
21	B	Dmytro Yakovenko	Ukraine	o	o	xo	xxx		2.19	
22	B	Barry Pender	Ireland	o	xo	xxx			2.14	
23	B	Dzmitry Nabokau	Belarus	xo	xxx				2.09	

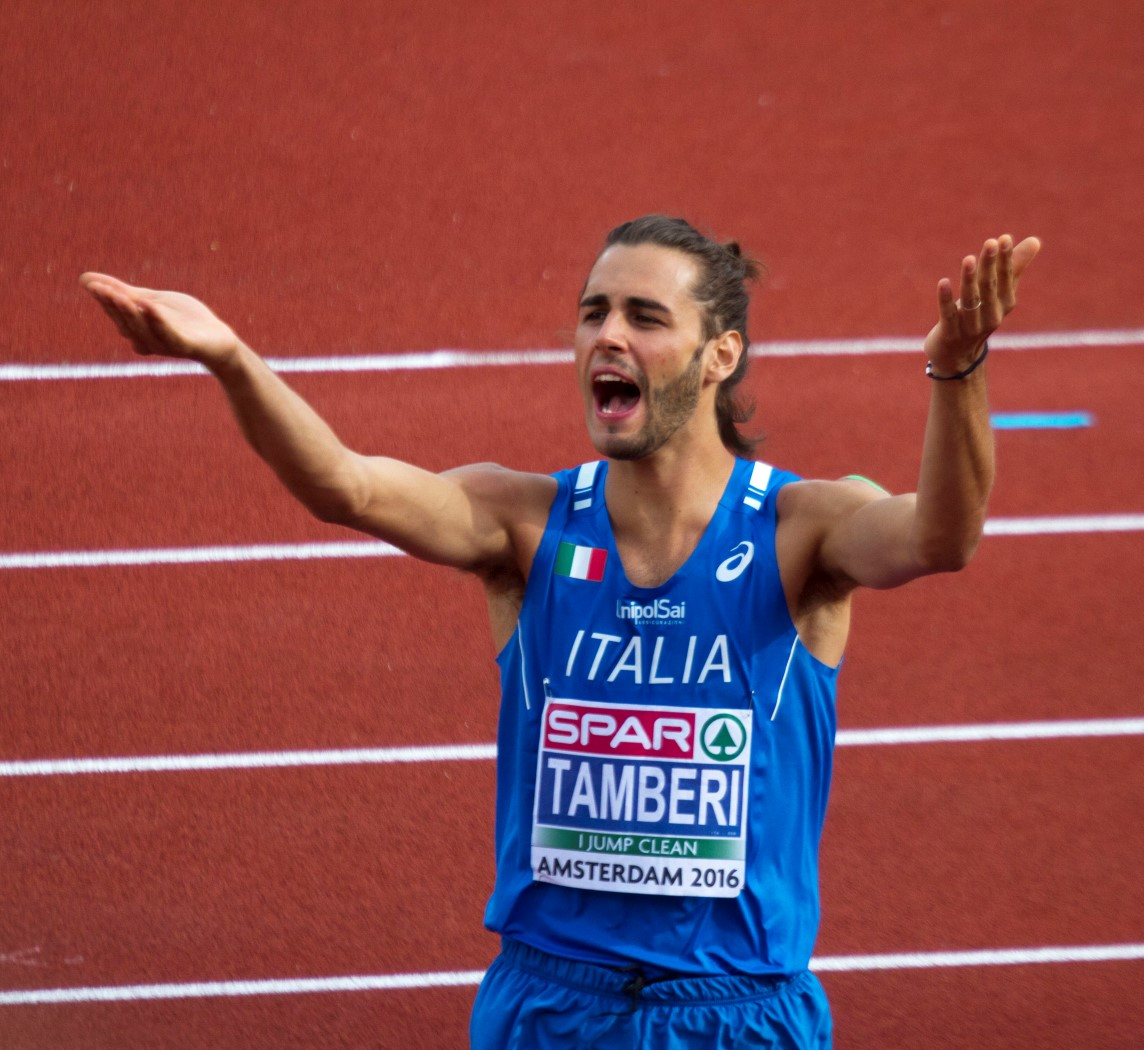
The winner, Gianmarco Tamberi.

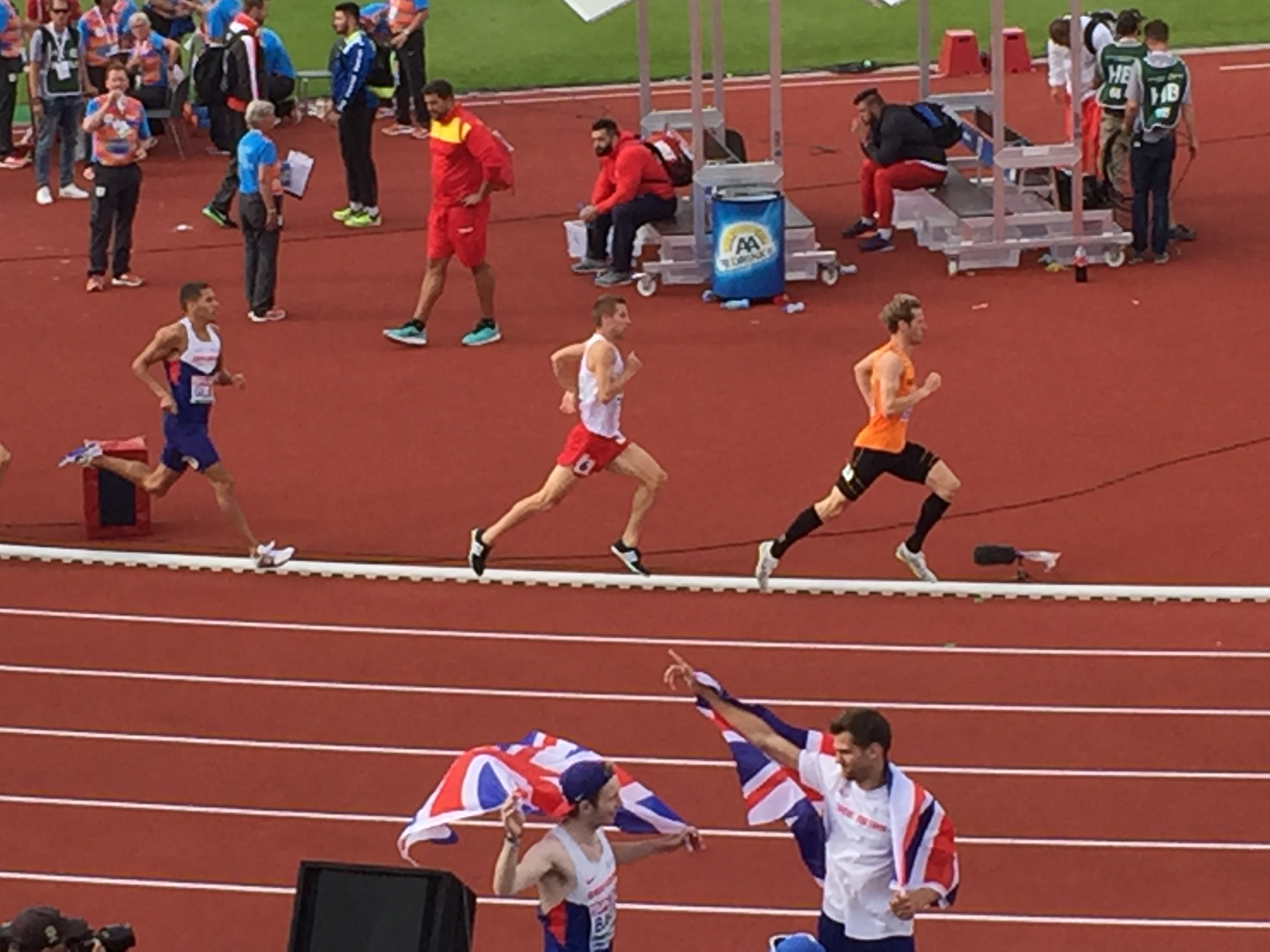
The two British medalists (in front)

=== Final ===
Rank	Name	Nationality	2.19	2.24	2.29	2.32	2.40	Result	Notes
1st place, gold medalist(s)	Gianmarco Tamberi	Italy	o	o	o	o	xxx	2.32	
2nd place, silver medalist(s)	Robbie Grabarz	Great Britain	o	xo	o	xxx		2.29	
3rd place, bronze medalist(s)	Chris Baker	Great Britain	o	o	xo	xxx		2.29	PB
3rd place, bronze medalist(s)	Eike Onnen	Germany	o	o	xo	xxx		2.29	
5	Tihomir Ivanov	Bulgaria	o	o	xxx			2.24	
6	Konstadinos Baniotis	Greece	xxo	o	xxx			2.24	
7	Jaroslav Bába	Czech Republic	o	xo	xx-	x		2.24	
7	Dimitrios Hondrokoukis	Cyprus	o	xo	xx-	x		2.24	
9	Vasilios Constantinou	Cyprus	o	xxo	xxx			2.24	
9	Andriy Protsenko	Ukraine	o	xxo	xx			2.24	
	Kyriakos Ioannou	Cyprus	–	–	xxx			NM	
	Miguel Ángel Sancho	Spain	xxx					NM	
