= 2014 European Athletics Championships – Men's high jump =

Men's high jump at the European Athletics Championships

The men's high jump at the 2014 European Athletics Championships took place at the Letzigrund on 13 and 15 August.

== Medalists ==
Gold	Bohdan Bondarenko; Ukraine
Silver	Andriy Protsenko; Ukraine
Bronze	Ivan Ukhov; Russia

== Records ==
Standing records prior to the 2014 European Athletics Championships
World record	Javier Sotomayor (CUB)	2.45 m	Salamanca, Spain	27 July 1993
European record	Patrik Sjöberg (SWE)	2.42 m	Stockholm, Sweden	30 June 1987
European record	Bohdan Bondarenko (UKR)	2.42 m	New York City, United States	14 June 2014
Championship record	Andrey Silnov (RUS)	2.36 m	Gothenburg, Sweden	9 August 2006
World Leading	Bohdan Bondarenko (UKR)	2.42 m	New York City, United States	14 June 2014
World Leading	Mutaz Essa Barshim (QAT)	2.42 m	New York City, United States	14 June 2014
European Leading	Bohdan Bondarenko (UKR)	2.42 m	New York City, United States	14 June 2014

== Schedule ==
Date	Time	Round
13 August 2014	10:07	Qualifying
15 August 2014	19:46	Final

All times are local times (UTC+2)

== Results ==
=== Qualification ===
Qualification: Qualification Performance 2.28 (Q) or at least 12 best performers advance to the final

Rank	Group	Name	Nationality	2.10	2.15	2.19	2.23	Mark	Note
1	B	Jaroslav Bába	Czech Republic	–	o	o	o	2.23	q
1	A	Bohdan Bondarenko	Ukraine	–	–	–	o	2.23	q
1	A	Mihai Donisan	Romania	o	o	o	o	2.23	q
1	B	Wojciech Theiner	Poland	o	o	o	o	2.23	q
1	B	Ivan Ukhov	Russia	–	o	o	o	2.23	q
6	B	Marco Fassinotti	Italy	o	o	o	xo	2.23	q
6	B	Andriy Protsenko	Ukraine	–	o	o	xo	2.23	q
6	A	Daniil Tsyplakov	Russia	o	o	o	xo	2.23	q
9	A	Chris Baker	Great Britain	o	o	o	xxo	2.23	q
9	A	Tihomir Ivanov	Bulgaria	o	o	o	xxo	2.23	q
11	A	Andrei Churyla	Belarus	o	o	xo	xxo	2.23	q
12	B	Yuriy Krymarenko	Ukraine	o	o	o	xxx	2.19	q
12	A	Raivydas Stanys	Lithuania	o	o	o	xxx	2.19	q
12	A	Gianmarco Tamberi	Italy	o	o	o	xxx	2.19	q
15	B	Jussi Viita	Finland	o	xo	o	xxx	2.19	
16	B	Eugenio Rossi	San Marino	xo	o	xo	xxx	2.19	
17	B	Lukáš Beer	Slovakia	o	xxo	xo	xxx	2.19	
18	A	Matúš Bubeník	Slovakia	o	o	xxo	xxx	2.19	
19	A	Mickaël Hanany	France	–	xo	xxo	xxx	2.19	
20	B	Konstadinos Baniotis	Greece	o	o	xxx		2.15	
21	A	Adónios Mástoras	Greece	–	xo	xxx		2.15	
22	B	Viktor Ninov	Bulgaria	o	xxo	xxx		2.15	
23	B	Aleksey Dmitrik	Russia	o	xxx			2.10	

=== Final ===
Rank	Name	Nationality	2.21	2.26	2.30	2.33	2.35	2.37	2.39	2.41	2.43	Mark	Note
1st place, gold medalist(s)	Bohdan Bondarenko	Ukraine	–	–	xo	–	xo	–	–	–	xr	2.35	
2nd place, silver medalist(s)	Andriy Protsenko	Ukraine	o	xxo	o	xxo	x–	xx				2.33	
3rd place, bronze medalist(s)	Ivan Ukhov	Russia	o	o	o	xxx						2.30	
4	Jaroslav Bába	Czech Republic	o	xxo	xo	xxx						2.30	
5	Daniil Tsyplakov	Russia	o	o	xxx							2.26	
6	Yuriy Krymarenko	Ukraine	xxo	o	xxx							2.26	
7	Marco Fassinotti	Italy	o	xo	xxx							2.26	
7	Tihomir Ivanov	Bulgaria	o	xo	xxx							2.26	
7	Gianmarco Tamberi	Italy	o	xo	xxx							2.26	SB
10	Wojciech Theiner	Poland	o	xxo	xxx							2.26	
11	Chris Baker	Great Britain	xxo	xxx								2.21	
11	Andrei Churyla	Belarus	xxo	xxx								2.21	
11	Mihai Donisan	Romania	xxo	xxx								2.21	
	Raivydas Stanys	Lithuania	xxx									NM	
