= Athletics at the 2011 Summer Universiade – Men's high jump =

The men's high jump event at the 2011 Summer Universiade was held on 16–18 August.

== Medalists ==
Gold	Silver	Bronze
Bohdan Bondarenko; Ukraine	Wojciech Theiner; Poland	Sergey Mudrov; Russia

== Results ==
=== Qualification ===
Qualification: 2.23 m (Q) or at least 12 best (q) qualified for the final.

Rank	Group	Athlete	Nationality	1.90	2.00	2.10	2.15	2.20	Result	Notes
1	A	Marco Fassinotti	Italy	–	o	o	o	o	2.20	q
1	A	Erik Kynard	United States	–	–	o	o	o	2.20	q
1	B	Sergey Mudrov	Russia	–	–	o	o	o	2.20	q
4	A	Raivydas Stanys	Lithuania	–	o	o	xo	o	2.20	q
5	A	Eduard Malchenko	Russia	–	o	o	o	xo	2.20	q
5	A	Andriy Protsenko	Ukraine	–	o	o	o	xo	2.20	q
5	A	Wang Yu	China	–	–	o	o	xo	2.20	q
5	B	Bohdan Bondarenko	Ukraine	–	–	o	o	xo	2.20	q
9	B	Jin Qichao	China	–	o	o	xo	xo	2.20	q
10	B	Keyvan Ghanbarzadeh	Iran	–	–	o	o	xxo	2.20	q, =PB
11	A	Wojciech Theiner	Poland	–	o	o	xo	xxo	2.20	q
12	A	Mark Dillon	Canada	–	–	xo	xo	xxo	2.20	q, SB
12	A	Kourosh Foroughi	Ireland	–	o	o	xxo	xxo	2.20	q, =PB
14	B	Mihai Donisan	Romania	–	–	o	o	xxx	2.15	
14	B	Edgar Rivera	Mexico	–	o	o	o	xxx	2.15	
16	B	Normunds Pūpols	Latvia	–	o	o	xxo	xxx	2.15	
16	B	Miguel Ángel Sancho	Spain	–	o	o	xxo	xxx	2.15	
18	B	Jussi Viita	Finland	–	o	o	xxx		2.10	
19	A	Ivan Nilsen	Norway	o	o	xxo	xxx		2.10	
19	A	Simón Siverio	Spain	o	o	xxo	xxx		2.10	
21	A	Philip Frifelt	Sweden	o	o	xxx			2.00	
21	B	Charles Witmer	Canada	–	o	xxx			2.00	
23	A	Lee Gwang-tae	South Korea	–	xo	xxx			2.00	
23	A	Khalid Essa Oqaybi	Saudi Arabia	o	xo	xxx			2.00	
23	B	William Crayford	New Zealand	o	xo	xxx			2.00	
26	B	Sayed Alawi	United Arab Emirates	–	xxo	xxx			2.00	
26	B	Julien Matongo Bong	Cameroon	–	xxo	xxx			2.00	
26	B	Naoto Tobe	Japan	–	xxo	xxx			2.00	
	A	Tomislav Popek	Croatia	–	xxx				NM	
	B	Wi Nadeesha Fernando	Sri Lanka	xxx					NM	
	B	Maungo Tsounyane	Botswana	xxx					NM	

=== Final ===
Rank	Athlete	Nationality	2.10	2.15	2.18	2.20	2.22	2.24	2.26	2.28	2.30	2.31	Result	Notes
1st place, gold medalist(s)	Bohdan Bondarenko	Ukraine	–	o	–	o	–	o	–	xo	–	x	2.28	
2nd place, silver medalist(s)	Wojciech Theiner	Poland	o	o	o	o	o	xo	xo	xx–	x		2.26	SB
3rd place, bronze medalist(s)	Sergey Mudrov	Russia	–	o	–	o	–	xo	–	xx			2.24	
4	Wang Yu	China	o	o	–	xxo	o	xo	xxx				2.24	
5	Raivydas Stanys	Lithuania	xxo	o	xx–	o	–	xxo	xxx				2.24	
6	Keyvan Ghanbarzadeh	Iran	o	xxo	xo	xo	xxx						2.20	=PB
7	Jin Qichao	China	o	–	–	xxo	–	xxx					2.20	
8	Eduard Malchenko	Russia	o	xo	o	xxo	xxx						2.20	
9	Mark Dillon	Canada	o	o	o	xxx							2.18	
9	Kourosh Foroughi	Ireland	o	o	o	xxx							2.18	
11	Andriy Protsenko	Ukraine	xo	o	o	x–	xx						2.18	
12	Marco Fassinotti	Italy	o	o	xxo	xxx							2.18	
13	Erik Kynard	United States	o	o	xxx								2.15	
