= Miguel Ángel Sancho =

Spanish high jumper

Miguel Ángel Sancho Rubio (born 24 April 1990) is a Spanish high jumper and mathematician.

He was born in Valencia. He finished fourth at the 2007 World Youth Championships and won the bronze medal at the 2008 World Junior Championships. He also competed at the 2009 European Indoor Championships without reaching the final.

His personal best jump is 2.26 metres, achieved in August 2011 in Málaga. He has 2.27 metres on the indoor track, achieved in February 2009 in San Sebastián.

== Competition record ==
Year	Competition	Venue	Position	Notes
Representing Spain
2007	World Youth Championships	Ostrava, Czech Republic	4th	2.16 m
2008	World Junior Championships	Bydgoszcz, Poland	3rd	2.21 m
2009	European Indoor Championships	Turin, Italy	19th (q)	2.22 m
2009	European Junior Championships	Novi Sad, Serbia	11th	2.07 m
2011	European U23 Championships	Ostrava, Czech Republic	3rd	2.21 m
2011	Universiade	Shenzhen, China	16th (q)	2.15 m
2012	European Championships	Helsinki, Finland	15th (q)	2.19 m
2013	Universiade	Kazan, Russia	11th	2.15 m
2015	European Indoor Championships	Prague, Czech Republic	25th (q)	2.14 m
2016	Ibero-American Championships	Rio de Janeiro, Brazil	3rd	2.23 m
2016	European Championships	Amsterdam, Netherlands	1st (q)	2.25 m^{1}
2017	European Indoor Championships	Belgrade, Serbia	– (q)	NM

^{1}No mark in the final
