= Aleksey Dmitrik =

Russian high jumper

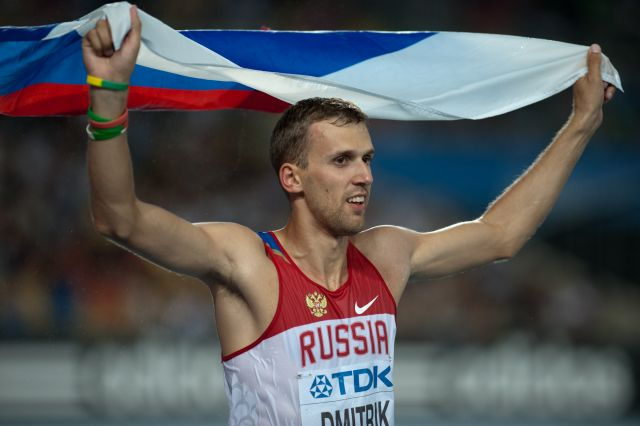
- Dmitrik at the 2011 World championships Athletics in Daegu

Medal record

Men's athletics

Representing Russia

World Championships
Silver medal – second place	2011 Daegu	High jump

European Indoor Championships
Silver medal – second place	2009 Torino	High jump
Silver medal – second place	2013 Gothenburg	High jump

Aleksey Vladimirovich Dmitrik (Russian: Алексей Владимирович Дмитрик; born 12 April 1984) is a Russian high jumper. He won the silver medal at the 2009 European Indoor Championships.

He was born in Slantsy, Leningrad Oblast. He won the gold medal at the 2001 World Youth Championships, finished fourteenth at the 2002 World Junior Championships and was the runner-up to Jaroslav Bába at the 2003 European Athletics Junior Championships. His first major win as a senior athlete came at the 2005 European Cup. He also competed at the 2007 European Indoor Championships, but without reaching the final. He achieved a personal best jump of 2.33 m in Thessaloniki in June 2009. He has 2.34 metres on the indoor track, achieved in January 2005 in Glasgow.

As one of three Russians in the men's high jump at the 2010 European Athletics Championships, he came seventh with a clearance of 2.26 m while Aleksander Shustov and Ivan Ukhov took the top two spots. In the 2011 season, he set a meet record of 2.30 m at the Meeting Grand Prix IAAF de Dakar, going on to jump an outright personal best of 2.35 m at the Gran Premio Iberoamericano in Huelva, Spain (which was also a world leading performance).

At the 2011 World Championships in Athletics he outperformed his compatriots Ivan Ukhov and Aleksandr Shustov by clearing 2.35 m. This mark brought Dmitrik the silver medal as he finished behind Jesse Williams on countback. The following year he won the Hochsprung mit Musik meet in February 2012, again beating Ukhov.

== Competition record ==
Year	Competition	Venue	Position	Notes
2001	World Youth Championships	Debrecen, Hungary	1st	2.23 m
2001	European Youth Olympics	Murcia, Spain	1st	2.14 m
2002	World Junior Championships	Kingston, Jamaica	14th	2.05 m
2003	European Junior Championships	Tampere, Finland	2nd	2.26 m
2005	European U23 Championships	Erfurt, Germany	6th	2.25 m
2007	European Indoor Championships	Birmingham, United Kingdom	20th (q)	2.18 m
2009	European Indoor Championships	Turin, Italy	2nd	2.29 m
2010	European Championships	Barcelona, Spain	7th	2.26 m
2011	World Championships	Daegu, South Korea	2nd	2.35 m
2013	European Indoor Championships	Gothenburg, Sweden	2nd	2.33 m
2013	World Championships	Moscow, Russia	25th (q)	2.17 m
2014	European Championships	Zürich, Switzerland	23rd (q)	2.10 m
2015	European Indoor Championships	Prague, Czech Republic	12th (q)	2.24 m
