= Track and field at the 2011 Military World Games – Men's high jump =

The men's high jump event at the 2011 Military World Games was held on 19 and 20 July at the Estádio Olímpico João Havelange.

== Records ==
Prior to this competition, the existing world and CISM record were as follows:

World Record	Javier Sotomayor (CUB)	2.45	Salamanca, Spain	27 July 1993
CISM World Record	Eugen-Cristian Popescu (ROU)	2.28	Tours, France	August 1993

== Schedule ==
Date	Time	Round
19 July 2011	16:10	Qualification
20 July 2011	16:20	Final

== Medalists ==
Gold	Silver	Bronze
Mutaz Barshim; Qatar	Yuriy Krymarenko; Ukraine	Dmytro Dem'yanyuk; Ukraine

== Results ==
=== Final ===
Rank	Athlete	Nationality	1.95	2.00	2.05	2.08	2.11	2.14	2.17	2.20	2.23	2.26	2.29	Mark	Notes
1st place, gold medalist(s)	Mutaz Barshim	Qatar	-	-	-	-	o	o	o	o	xxo	o	xo	2.29	CR
2nd place, silver medalist(s)	Yuriy Krymarenko	Ukraine	-	-	-	-	o	o	-	xo	o	xxx		2.23	
3rd place, bronze medalist(s)	Dmytro Dem'yanyuk	Ukraine	-	-	-	-	-	o	-	o	-	xxx		2.20	
4	Kivan Ghanbarzadeh	Iran	-	-	o	-	o	xo	xo	o	xxx			2.20	
5	Nicola Ciotti	Italy	-	-	o	-	o	o	o	xo	xxx			2.20	
6	Artsiom Zaitsau	Belarus	-	-	-	-	o	o	o	xxx				2.17	
7	Chen Ji	China	-	o	o	-	xo	o	o	xxx				2.17	
8	Majd Eddin Ghazal	Syria	-	-	-	-	xo	o	xo	xxx				2.17	
9	Andrea Bettinelli	Italy	-	-	o	-	x-	xo	xx-	x				2.14	
10	Peter Horák	Slovakia	-	-	o	-	xo	xxo	xxx					2.14	
11	Rashid Al-Mannai	Qatar	-	-	o	o	o	xxx						2.11	
12	Nawaf Ahmed Al-Yami	Saudi Arabia	-	o	o	xo	xxx							2.08	
