= Athletics at the 2013 Summer Universiade – Men's high jump =

The men's high jump event at the 2013 Summer Universiade was held on 7–9 July.

== Medalists ==
Gold	Silver	Bronze
Sergey Mudrov; Russia	Andriy Protsenko; Ukraine	Wang Yu; China

== Results ==
=== Qualification ===
Qualification: 2.23 m (Q) or at least 12 best (q) qualified for the final.

Rank	Group	Athlete	Nationality	1.85	1.95	2.05	2.10	2.15	2.20	Result	Notes
1	B	Andriy Protsenko	Ukraine	-	-	o	o	o	o	2.20	q
1	A	Nikola Bojic	Australia	-	-	o	o	o	o	2.20	q
1	B	Edgar Rivera	Mexico	-	-	-	o	o	o	2.20	q
1	B	Naoto Tobe	Japan	-	-	-	o	o	o	2.20	q
1	B	Ivan Ukhov	Russia	-	-	-	o	o	o	2.20	q
1	A	Sergey Mudrov	Russia	-	-	-	-	-	o	2.20	q
1	A	Wang Yu	China	-	-	-	o	-	o	2.20	q
8	A	Jussi Viita	Finland	-	-	o	o	xo	o	2.20	q, SB
8	B	Raivydas Stanys	Lithuania	-	-	o	xo	o	o	2.20	q
10	B	Wojciech Theiner	Poland	-	-	xo	o	o	xo	2.20	q
11	A	Luis Castro	Puerto Rico	-	-	o	o	o	xxx	2.15	q
11	A	Miguel Ángel Sancho	Spain	-	-	o	o	o	xxx	2.15	q
11	B	Montez Blair	United States	-	-	-	o	o	xxx	2.15	q
11	B	Miloš Todosijević	Serbia	-	o	o	o	o	xxx	2.15	q
15	A	Serhat Birinci	Turkey	-	-	-	-	xo	xxx	2.15	
15	A	Django Lovett	Canada	-	-	o	o	xo	xxx	2.15	
17	B	Nauraj Singh Randhawa	Malaysia	-	o	o	o	xxo	xxx	2.15	=PB
17	B	Alexandru Tufa	Romania	-	-	o	o	xxo	xxx	2.15	
19	B	Jeremy Eckert	Canada	-	o	xxo	o	xxo	xxx	2.15	
20	A	Anton Bodnar	Kazakhstan	-	-	-	o	-	xxx	2.10	
20	A	Yun Seung-hyun	South Korea	-	-	o	o	xxx		2.10	
22	B	Jakob Thorvaldsson	Sweden	-	-	o	xxo	xxx		2.10	SB
23	A	Ivan Kristoffer Nilsen	Norway	-	xo	xo	xxo	xxx		2.10	
24	A	Ile Faisal Zaman	United Arab Emirates	-	o	o	xxx			2.05	
24	B	Chethan Balasubramanya	India	-	o	o	xxx			2.05	
26	A	Indrek Kalvet	Estonia	-	o	xo	xxx			2.05	
26	A	Ernestas Raudys	Lithuania	o	o	xo	xxx			2.05	
28	B	Andreas Jeppesen	Denmark	o	o	xxo	xxx			2.05	=PB
29	A	Tshwanelo Aabobe	Botswana	-	o	xxx				1.95	
30	A	Jethro Kwenani	Namibia	o	xxx					1.85	
	B	Jeyaruban Elalasingam	Sri Lanka	xxx						NM	
	A	Foday Koroma	Sierra Leone							DNS	
	B	Emmanuel Bendu	Sierra Leone							DNS	
	B	Oscar Katuka	Zimbabwe							DNS	
	B	Martins Zacests	Latvia							DNS	

=== Final ===
Official Video

Rank	Athlete	Nationality	2.05	2.10	2.15	2.20	2.25	2.28	2.31	2.34	Result	Notes
1st place, gold medalist(s)	Sergey Mudrov	Russia	-	-	o	xo	o	xxo	o	xxx	2.31	PB
2nd place, silver medalist(s)	Andriy Protsenko	Ukraine	-	o	xo	o	xo	xo	xxo	xxx	2.31	PB
3rd place, bronze medalist(s)	Wang Yu	China	-	o	o	o	xo	o	xxx		2.28	
4	Nikola Bojic	Australia	-	o	o	xo	xxo	o	xxx		2.28	PB
5	Ivan Ukhov	Russia	-	-	o	o	o	xo	xxx		2.28	SB
6	Wojciech Theiner	Poland	-	o	o	o	xxo	x-	xx		2.25	
7	Raivydas Stanys	Lithuania	-	o	o	o	xxx				2.20	
8	Jussi Viita	Finland	-	o	o	xo	xxx				2.20	SB
9	Naoto Tobe	Japan	-	o	o	xxo	xxx				2.20	
10	Edgar Rivera	Mexico	-	o	xo	xxx					2.15	
11	Luis Castro	Puerto Rico	o	o	xxo	xxx					2.15	
11	Miguel Ángel Sancho	Spain	o	o	xxo	xxx					2.15	
13	Miloš Todosijević	Serbia	o	o	xxx						2.10	
14	Montez Blair	United States	-	xo	xxx						2.10	
