= 2013 World Championships in Athletics – Men's high jump =

Men's high jump at the 2013 World Championships
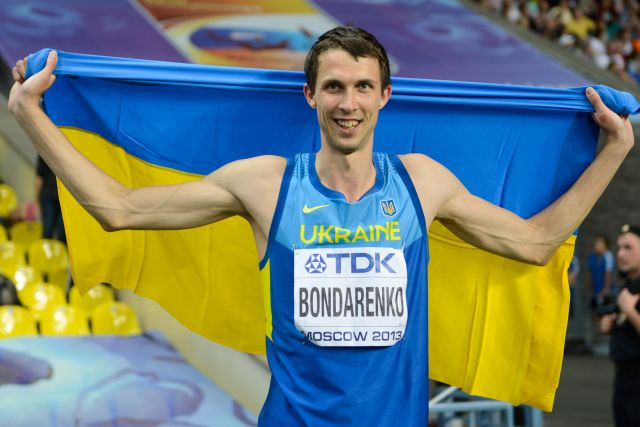
- Gold medalist Bohdan Bondarenko
- Venue: Luzhniki Stadium
- Dates: 13 August (qualification); 15 August (final)
- Competitors: 34 from 22 nations
- Winning height: 2.41 m (7 ft 10 3/4 in)

Medalists
gold medal	Bohdan Bondarenko; Ukraine
silver medal	Mutaz Essa Barshim; Qatar
bronze medal	Derek Drouin; Canada

The men's high jump at the 2013 World Championships in Athletics was held at the Luzhniki Stadium on 13–15 August.

With 18 over 2.26 m (7 ft 4 3/4 in), it took a first attempt clearance and one miss to make it into the final.

In the final, three remained perfect to 2.35 m (7 ft 8 1/2 in), with Mutaz Essa Barshim just one miss behind, while Donald Thomas passed his personal best. But Barshim seized the lead with a first attempt clearance at 2.38 m (7 ft 9 1/2 in). Thomas and home team favorite Ivan Ukhov couldn't make the height, while Derek Drouin set a Canadian national record clearing on his second attempt. World leader Bohdan Bondarenko confidently passed the height knowing it would require him to equal his world leading jump from the previous month and to break Javier Sotomayor's championship record. On his second attempt at 2.41 m (7 ft 10 3/4 in), he made it to take the lead. Drouin took his three attempts and settled for bronze. Already above his personal best, Barshim passed to 2.44 m (8 ft 0 in), 1 cm below the world record, to try for the win but couldn't get it. Bondarenko watched, then took three attempts at Sotomayor's world record.

== Records ==
Prior to the competition, the records were as follows:

World record	Javier Sotomayor (CUB)	2.45	Salamanca, Spain	27 July 1993
Championship record	Javier Sotomayor (CUB)	2.40	Stuttgart, Germany	22 August 1993
World leading	Bohdan Bondarenko (UKR)	2.41	Lausanne, Switzerland	4 July 2013
African record	Jacques Freitag (RSA)	2.38	Oudtshoorn, South Africa	5 March 2005
Asian record	Mutaz Essa Barshim (QAT)	2.40	Eugene, United States	1 June 2013
North, Central American and Caribbean record	Javier Sotomayor (CUB)	2.45	Salamanca, Spain	27 July 1993
South American record	Gilmar Mayo (COL)	2.33A	Pereira, Colombia	17 October 1994
European record	Patrik Sjöberg (SWE)	2.42	Stockholm, Sweden	30 June 1987
Oceanian record	Tim Forsyth (AUS)	2.36	Melbourne, Australia	2 March 1997

== Qualification standards ==
A result	B result
2.31	2.28

== Schedule ==
Date	Time	Round
13 August 2013	09:50	Qualification
15 August 2013	19:00	Final

All times are local times (UTC+4)

== Results ==
KEY:	Q	Qualified	q	12 best performers	NR	National record	PB	Personal best	SB	Seasonal best

=== Qualification ===
Qualification: Qualifying Performance 2.31 (Q) or at least 12 best performers (q) advance to the final.

Rank	Group	Name	Nationality	2.17	2.22	2.26	2.29	Mark	Notes
1	A	Robert Grabarz	Great Britain & N.I.	o	o	o	o	2.29	q
1	A	Aleksandr Shustov	Russia	o	o	o	o	2.29	q
1	B	Bohdan Bondarenko	Ukraine	–	o	–	o	2.29	q
1	B	Ivan Ukhov	Russia	o	o	o	o	2.29	q
5	A	Donald Thomas	Bahamas	o	o	xxo	o	2.29	q
6	A	Mutaz Essa Barshim	Qatar	o	o	o	xxo	2.29	q
6	B	Zhang Guowei	China	o	o	o	xxo	2.29	q
8	B	Derek Drouin	Canada	o	o	xo	xxo	2.29	q
9	B	Ryan Ingraham	Bahamas	o	o	o	xxx	2.26	q
9	A	Konstadinos Baniotis	Greece	o	o	o	xo	2.26	q
11	A	Erik Kynard	United States	o	xo	o	xxx	2.26	q
11	A	Kabelo Kgosiemang	Botswana	xo	o	o	xxx	2.26	q
13	B	Adónios Mástoras	Greece	xxo	o	o	xxx	2.26	
14	B	Mickaël Hanany	France	o	o	xo	xxx	2.26	
14	A	Jaroslav Bába	Czech Republic	o	o	xo	xxx	2.26	
16	A	Mihai Donisan	Romania	o	xo	xo	xxx	2.26	
16	B	Dusty Jonas	United States	xo	o	xo	xxx	2.26	
16	B	Silvano Chesani	Italy	xo	o	xo	xxx	2.26	
19	B	Yuriy Krymarenko	Ukraine	o	o	xxx		2.22	
19	A	Wang Yu	China	o	o	xxx		2.22	
21	B	Majed Al-Din Ghazal	Syria	xo	o	xxx		2.22	SB
22	B	Edgar Rivera	Mexico	o	xo	xxx		2.22	
23	B	Jesse Williams	United States	o	xxo	xxx		2.22	
23	A	Andriy Protsenko	Ukraine	o	xxo	xxx		2.22	
25	A	Rožle Prezelj	Slovenia	o	xxx			2.17	
25	A	Michael Mason	Canada	o	xxx			2.17	
25	A	Douwe Amels	Netherlands	o	xxx			2.17	
25	A	Diego Ferrín	Ecuador	o	xR			2.17	
25	B	Ali Mohd Younes Idriss	Sudan	o	xxx			2.17	
25	B	Aleksey Dmitrik	Russia	o	xxx			2.17	
25	B	Szymon Kiecana	Poland	o	xxx			2.17	
25	B	Brandon Starc	Australia	o	xxx			2.17	
	A	Bi Xiaoliang	China	xxx				NM	
	A	Keith Moffatt	United States	xxx				NM	

=== Final ===
The final was started at 19:00.

Rank	Name	Nationality	2.20	2.25	2.29	2.32	2.35	2.38	2.41	2.44	2.46	Mark	Notes
1st place, gold medalist(s)	Bohdan Bondarenko	Ukraine	–	–	o	–	o	–	xo	–	xxx	2.41	CR, =NR
2nd place, silver medalist(s)	Mutaz Essa Barshim	Qatar	o	o	o	xo	o	o	x-	xx		2.38	
3rd place, bronze medalist(s)	Derek Drouin	Canada	o	o	o	o	o	xo	xxx			2.38	NR
4	Erik Kynard	United States	o	o	o	xo	xxx					2.32	
5	Donald Thomas	Bahamas	xo	o	o	xo	–	xxx				2.32	SB
6	Robert Grabarz	Great Britain & N.I.	o	o	xo	xxx						2.29	
7	Zhang Guowei	China	o	xxo	xo	xxx						2.29	
8	Kabelo Kgosiemang	Botswana	o	o	xxx							2.25	
8	Ryan Ingraham	Bahamas	o	o	xxx							2.25	
8	Konstadinos Baniotis	Greece	o	o	xxx							2.25	
DQ	Ivan Ukhov	Russia	~~o~~	~~o~~	~~o~~	~~o~~	~~o~~	~~xxx~~				~~2.35~~	~~SB~~
DQ	Aleksandr Shustov	Russia	~~o~~	~~o~~	~~xo~~	~~xxo~~	~~xxx~~					~~2.32~~	~~SB~~

When the event took place, Ukhov and Shustov placed 4th and 7th respectively. However, in 2019 and 2020 these athletes had their results disqualified after receiving retrospective anti-doping bans.
