= 2013 European Athletics Indoor Championships – Men's high jump =

The Men's high jump event at the 2013 European Athletics Indoor Championships was held at March 1, 2013 at 16:30 & 18:30 (qualification) and March 2, 16:15 (final) local time.

== Records ==
Standing records prior to the 2013 European Athletics Indoor Championships
World record	Javier Sotomayor (CUB)	2.43	Budapest, Hungary	4 March 1989
European record	Carlo Thränhardt (FRG)	2.42	Berlin, West Germany	26 February 1988
Championship record	Stefan Holm (SWE)	2.40	Madrid, Spain	6 March 2005
World Leading	Mutaz Essa Barshim (QAT)	2.37	Moscow, Russia	3 February 2013
European Leading	Aleksey Dmitrik (RUS)	2.36	Arnstadt, Germany	2 February 2013

== Results ==
=== Qualification ===
Qualification: Qualification Performance 2.31 (Q) or at least 8 best performers advanced to the final.

Rank	Group	Athlete	Nationality	2.08	2.13	2.18	2.23	2.28	2.31	Result	Note
1	A	Sergey Mudrov	Russia	–	–	o	o	o	xx–	2.28	q
2	B	Adónios Mástoras	Greece	–	xo	o	o	o	–	2.28	q
3	B	Jaroslav Bába	Czech Republic	–	–	o	o	xo	–	2.28	q
4	B	Aleksey Dmitrik	Russia	–	o	o	xo	xo	–	2.28	q
5	A	Mickaël Hanany	France	–	xxo	o	o	xxo	–	2.28	q
6	A	Konstadínos Baniótis	Greece	–	–	o	o	xxx		2.23	q
6	B	Dmytro Dem'yanyuk	Ukraine	–	o	o	o	xxx		2.23	q
6	B	Robbie Grabarz	Great Britain	–	–	o	o	xxx		2.23	q
6	B	Gianmarco Tamberi	Italy	–	o	o	o	xxx		2.23	q
10	A	Silvano Chesani	Italy	–	xo	o	o	xxx		2.23	
11	A	Yuriy Krymarenko	Ukraine	–	o	xo	xo	xxx		2.23	
11	B	Vitaliy Samoylenko	Ukraine	–	o	xo	xo	xxx		2.23	
13	B	Marco Fassinotti	Italy	–	o	o	xxo	xxx		2.23	
13	A	Viktor Ninov	Bulgaria	–	o	o	xxo	xxx		2.23	
15	A	Dmitriy Semenov	Russia	–	o	o	xxx			2.18	
15	B	Serhat Birinci	Turkey	–	o	o	xxx			2.18	
15	B	Mihai Donisan	Romania	–	o	o	xxx			2.18	
18	B	Matúš Bubeník	Slovakia	–	xo	o	xxx			2.18	
19	A	Alen Melon	Croatia	–	o	xo	xxx			2.18	
20	A	Michal Kabelka	Slovakia	–	o	xxo	xxx			2.18	
20	B	Jānis Vanags	Latvia	–	o	xxo	xxx			2.18	
22	A	Zurab Gogochuri	Georgia	–	o	DNF				2.13	
22	B	Matthias Haverney	Germany	–	o	xxx				2.13	
24	A	Alexandru Tufa	Romania	xxo	o	xxx				2.13	
25	A	Peter Horák	Slovakia	–	xo	xxx				2.13	
26	A	Eugenio Rossi	San Marino	xo	xxx					2.08	=SB
	A	Osku Torro	Finland							DNS	

=== Final ===
The final was held at 16:15.

Rank	Athlete	Nationality	2.15	2.17	2.19	2.21	2.23	2.25	2.27	2.29	2.31	2.33	2.35	2.37	Result	Note
1st place, gold medalist(s)	Sergey Mudrov	Russia	–	–	o	–	o	–	o	–	xo	o	o	xxx	2.35	PB
2nd place, silver medalist(s)	Aleksey Dmitrik	Russia	–	o	–	o	–	o	–	xo	xo	o	x-	xx	2.33	
3rd place, bronze medalist(s)	Jaroslav Bába	Czech Republic	–	–	–	xo	–	o	o	o	xo	x-	xx		2.31	SB
4	Adónios Mástoras	Greece	xo	–	o	–	o	–	o	o	xx-	x			2.29	PB
5	Gianmarco Tamberi	Italy	o	–	o	–	o	o	o	xo	xx-	x			2.29	
6	Robbie Grabarz	Great Britain	–	–	o	–	o	xxx							2.23	
7	Mickaël Hanany	France	o	–	o	–	xo	xxx							2.23	
8	Dmytro Dem'yanyuk	Ukraine	o	–	–	xo	–	xxx							2.21	
9	Konstadínos Baniótis	Greece	–	–	o	–	xxx								2.19	
