= Konstadinos Baniotis =

Greek high jumper (born 1986)

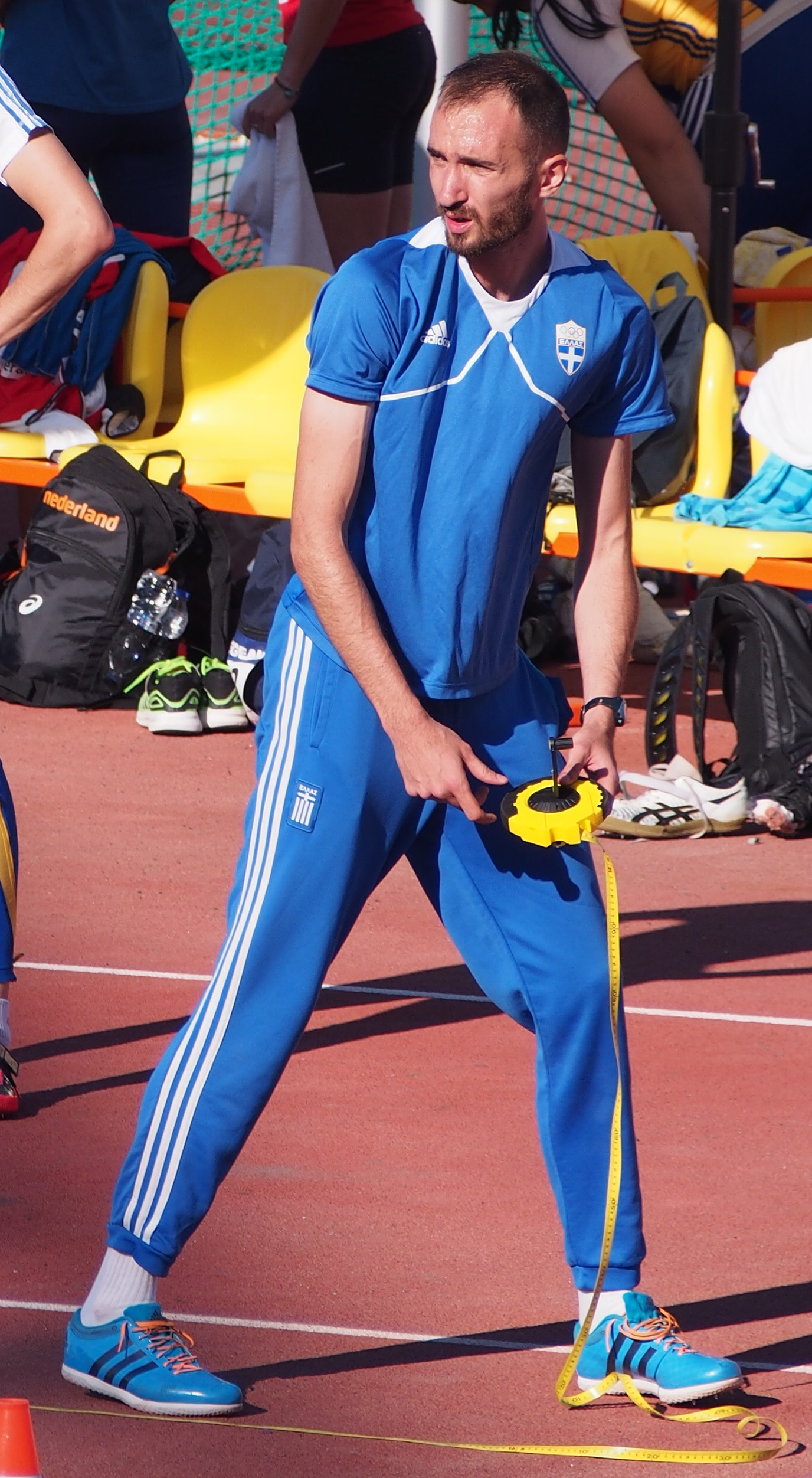
- Kostas Baniotis in Heraklion, 2015

Personal information
- Born: 6 November 1986 (age 39)
- Height: 2 m (6 ft 6 1/2 in)
- Weight: 81 kg (179 lb)

Sport
- Country: Greece
- Sport: Athletics
- Event: High jump

Achievements and titles
- Personal bests: 2.34 m 2.33 m (i)
Medal record
European Indoor Championships
Silver medal – second place	2019 Glasgow	High jump
Mediterranean Games
Gold medal – first place	2013 Mersin	High jump
Silver medal – second place	2009 Pescara	High jump
Silver medal – second place	2018 Tarragona	High jump

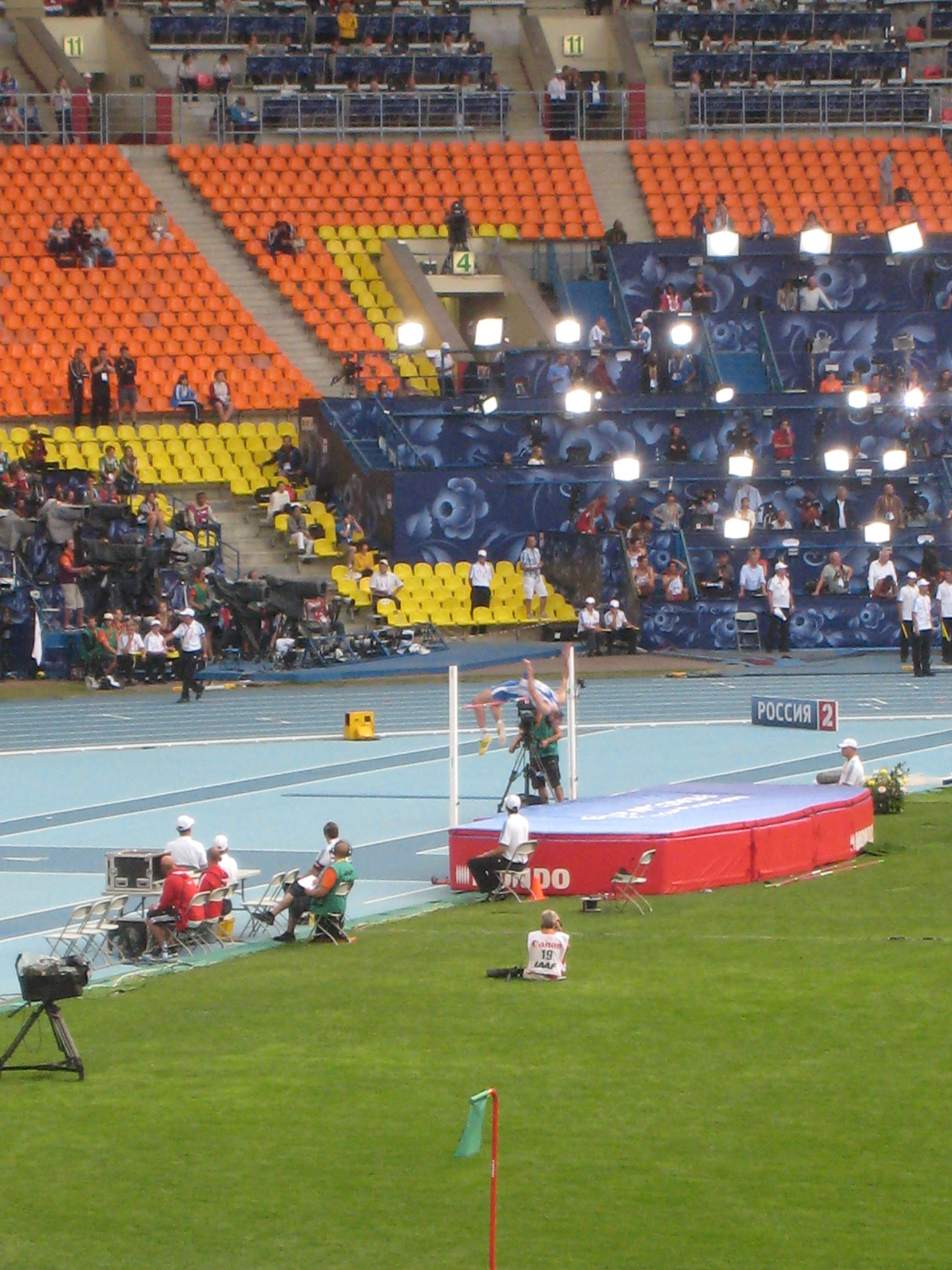
Kostas Baniotis in Moscow, 2013

Konstadinos "Kostas" Baniotis (Greek: Κωνσταντίνος "Κώστας" Μπανιώτης; born 6 November 1986 in Komotini, Rhodope) is a retired Greek high jumper.

== Biography ==
He finished sixth at the 2009 European Indoor Championships, sixth at the 2009 European Team Championships (Super League), seventh at the 2009 World Athletics Final, eighth at the 2010 European Championships, while he took the 4th place in the 2011 European Indoor Championships, with a new personal record of 2.32 m. He also won the silver medal at the 2009 Mediterranean Games in Pescara. He competed at the 2008 Olympic Games, the 2012 Summer Olympics, and the 2009 World Championships without reaching the final. His uncle is the former football player Charis Baniotis.

== Competition record ==
Year	Competition	Venue	Position	Notes
Representing Greece
2007	European U23 Championships	Debrecen, Hungary	12th	2.14 m
2007	Universiade	Bangkok, Thailand	7th	2.15 m
2008	Olympic Games	Beijing, China	37th (q)	2.10 m
2009	European Indoor Championships	Turin, Italy	6th	2.29 m
2009	Mediterranean Games	Pescara, Italy	2nd	2.28 m
2009	World Championships	Berlin, Germany	16th (q)	2.24 m
2010	European Championships	Barcelona, Spain	8th	2.23 m
2011	European Indoor Championships	Paris, France	4th	2.32 m (PB)
2011	World Championships	Daegu, South Korea	15th (q)	2.28 m
2012	World Indoor Championships	Istanbul, Turkey	4th	2.31 m
2012	European Championships	Helsinki, Finland	16th (q)	2.19 m
2012	Olympic Games	London, United Kingdom	25th (q)	2.21 m
2013	European Indoor Championships	Gothenburg, Sweden	9th	2.19 m
2013	Mediterranean Games	Mersin, Turkey	1st	2.34 m (PB)
2013	World Championships	Moscow, Russia	10th	2.25 m
2014	European Championships	Zürich, Switzerland	20th (q)	2.15 m
2015	European Indoor Championships	Prague, Czech Republic	12th (q)	2.24 m
2015	World Championships	Beijing, China	14th	2.20 m
2016	World Indoor Championships	Portland, USA	5th	2.29 m
2016	European Championships	Amsterdam, Netherlands	6th	2.24 m
2016	Olympic Games	Rio de Janeiro, Brazil	34th (q)	2.22 m
2018	Mediterranean Games	Tarragona, Spain	2nd	2.23 m
2018	European Championships	Berlin, Germany	10th	2.19 m
2019	European Indoor Championships	Glasgow, Scotland	2nd	2.26 m
