= 2011 European Athletics U23 Championships – Men's high jump =

The Men's high jump event at the 2011 European Athletics U23 Championships was held in Ostrava, Czech Republic, at Městský stadion on 15 and 17 July.

== Medalists ==
Gold	Bohdan Bondarenko; Ukraine
Silver	Sergey Mudrov; Russia
Bronze	Miguel Ángel Sancho; Spain

== Results ==
=== Final ===
17 July 2011 / 15:05

Rank	Name	Nationality	Attempts											Result	Notes
Rank	Name	Nationality	2.00	2.05	2.10	2.14	2.18	2.21	2.24	2.26	2.28	2.30	2.32	Result	Notes
1st place, gold medalist(s)	Bohdan Bondarenko	Ukraine	-	-	o	-	o	o	o	o	x-	o	xxx	2.30	PB
2nd place, silver medalist(s)	Sergey Mudrov	Russia	-	-	o	o	o	xo	xo	o	-	xxo	xxx	2.30	PB
3rd place, bronze medalist(s)	Miguel Ángel Sancho	Spain	-	o	o	o	o	o	xxx					2.21	=SB
4	Szymon Kiecana	Poland	-	o	o	xo	xo	o	xxx					2.21	PB
5	Marco Fassinotti	Italy	-	o	o	o	o	xo	xxx					2.21	
6	Jarosław Rutkowski	Poland	-	-	o	xo	xxo	xxo	xxx					2.21	
7	Kourosh Foroughi	Ireland	-	o	o	o	o	xxx						2.18	
8	Matúš Bubeník	Slovakia	o	o	o	o	xxo	xxx						2.18	
9	Alen Melon	Croatia	-	o	o	xo	xxo	xxx						2.18	PB
10	Michael Salomon	France	-	o	o	o	xxx							2.14	
11	Serhat Birinci	Turkey	-	o	xo	o	xxx							2.14	
12	Artsem Naumovich	Belarus	o	o	o	xxo	xx-	x						2.14	

=== Qualifications ===
Qualified: qualifying perf. 2.20 (Q) or 12 best performers (q) to the advance to the Final

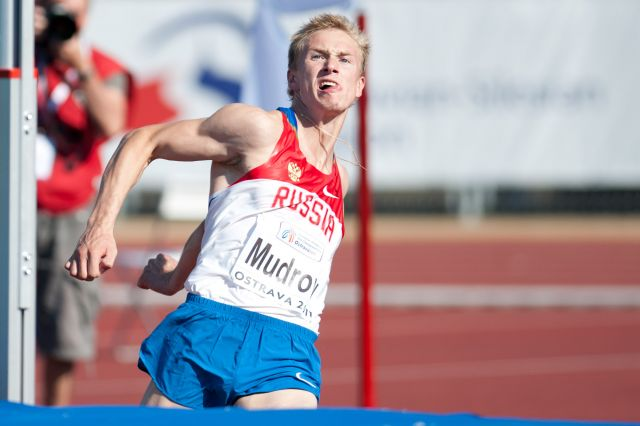
Silver medalist Sergey Mudrov competing in the final

==== Summary ====
Rank	Name	Nationality	Result	Notes
1	Bohdan Bondarenko	Ukraine	2.14	q
1	Szymon Kiecana	Poland	2.14	q
1	Sergey Mudrov	Russia	2.14	q
4	Kourosh Foroughi	Ireland	2.14	q
4	Jarosław Rutkowski	Poland	2.14	q
6	Serhat Birinci	Turkey	2.11	q
6	Marco Fassinotti	Italy	2.11	q
6	Alen Melon	Croatia	2.11	q
6	Michael Salomon	France	2.11	q
10	Miguel Ángel Sancho	Spain	2.11	q
11	Matúš Bubeník	Slovakia	2.11	q
12	Artsem Naumovich	Belarus	2.11	q
13	Kristoffer Nilsen	Norway	2.08	
14	Emil Svensson	Sweden	2.08	
15	Douwe Amels	Netherlands	2.08	
15	David Smith	Great Britain	2.08	
17	Lukáš Beer	Slovakia	2.04	
17	Andriy Rubel	Ukraine	2.04	
19	Emil Niţă	Romania	2.04	

==== Details ====
===== Group A =====
15 July 2011 / 10:30

Rank	Name	Nationality	Attempts							Result	Notes
Rank	Name	Nationality	1.90	1.95	2.00	2.04	2.08	2.11	2.14	Result	Notes
1	Sergey Mudrov	Russia	-	-	-	-	o	o	o	2.14	q
2	Kourosh Foroughi	Ireland	-	-	o	o	xo	o	o	2.14	q
2	Jarosław Rutkowski	Poland	-	-	o	o	o	xo	o	2.14	q
4	Matúš Bubeník	Slovakia	-	-	o	xo	o	xo	xxx	2.11	q
5	Emil Svensson	Sweden	-	-	-	xo	xo	xxx		2.08	
6	Douwe Amels	Netherlands	-	-	-	xo	xxo	xxx		2.08	
6	David Smith	Great Britain	-	-	o	xo	xxo	xxx		2.08	
8	Andriy Rubel	Ukraine	-	-	-	o	xxx			2.04	
9	Emil Niţă	Romania	-	o	xo	xxo	xxx			2.04	

===== Group B =====
15 July 2011 / 10:30

Rank	Name	Nationality	Attempts							Result	Notes
Rank	Name	Nationality	1.90	1.95	2.00	2.04	2.08	2.11	2.14	Result	Notes
1	Bohdan Bondarenko	Ukraine	-	-	-	-	o	-	o	2.14	q
1	Szymon Kiecana	Poland	-	-	o	o	o	o	o	2.14	q
3	Serhat Birinci	Turkey	-	-	o	o	o	o	x	2.11	q
3	Marco Fassinotti	Italy	-	-	o	-	o	o	x	2.11	q
3	Alen Melon	Croatia	-	-	o	o	o	o	x	2.11	q
3	Michael Salomon	France	-	-	-	o	o	o	x	2.11	q
7	Miguel Ángel Sancho	Spain	-	-	o	o	xo	o	x	2.11	q
8	Artsem Naumovich	Belarus	-	o	xo	o	o	xxo	x	2.11	q
9	Kristoffer Nilsen	Norway	-	-	o	o	o	xxx		2.08	
10	Lukáš Beer	Slovakia	-	o	o	o	xxx			2.04	

== Participation ==
According to an unofficial count, 19 athletes from 16 countries participated in the event.

- Belarus (1)
- Croatia (1)
- France (1)
- Ireland (1)
- Italy (1)
- Netherlands (1)
- Norway (1)
- Poland (2)
- Romania (1)
- Russia (1)
- Slovakia (2)
- Spain (1)
- Sweden (1)
- Turkey (1)
- Ukraine (2)
- United Kingdom (1)
