= Wang Yu (high jumper) =

Chinese high jumper (born 1991)

Wang Yu (Chinese: 王宇; born 18 August 1991 in Zhuhai) is a Chinese athlete specializing in the high jump. He won the bronze medal at the 2013 Summer Universiade in Kazan.

He has personal bests of 2.33 metres outdoors (Beijing 2013) and 2.34 metres indoors (PSD Bank Meeting, Düsseldorf 2019, NR).

In 2019, his season best is 2.31 m in Nanjing (CHN), on 21 May 2019.

== Competition record ==
Year	Competition	Venue	Position	Notes
Representing China
2011	Universiade	Shenzhen, China	4th	2.24 m
2012	Asian Indoor Championships	Hangzhou, China	4th	2.15 m
2013	Universiade	Kazan, Russia	3rd	2.28 m
2013	World Championships	Moscow, Russia	19th (q)	2.22 m
2014	World Indoor Championships	Sopot, Poland	10th (q)	2.25 m
2014	Asian Games	Incheon, South Korea	4th	2.25 m
2015	Asian Championships	Wuhan, China	6th	2.15 m
2015	World Championships	Beijing, China	18th (q)	2.26 m
2016	Olympic Games	Rio de Janeiro, Brazil	32nd (q)	2.22 m
2017	World Championships	London, United Kingdom	12th (q)	2.29 m^{1}
2018	World Indoor Championships	Birmingham, United Kingdom	6th	2.20 m
2018	Asian Games	Jakarta, Indonesia	1st	2.30 m
2019	World Championships	Doha, Qatar	10th	2.24 m
2021	Olympic Games	Tokyo, Japan	17th (q)	2.21 m

^{1}Did not start in the final
