= Marco Fassinotti =

Italian high jumper (born 1989)

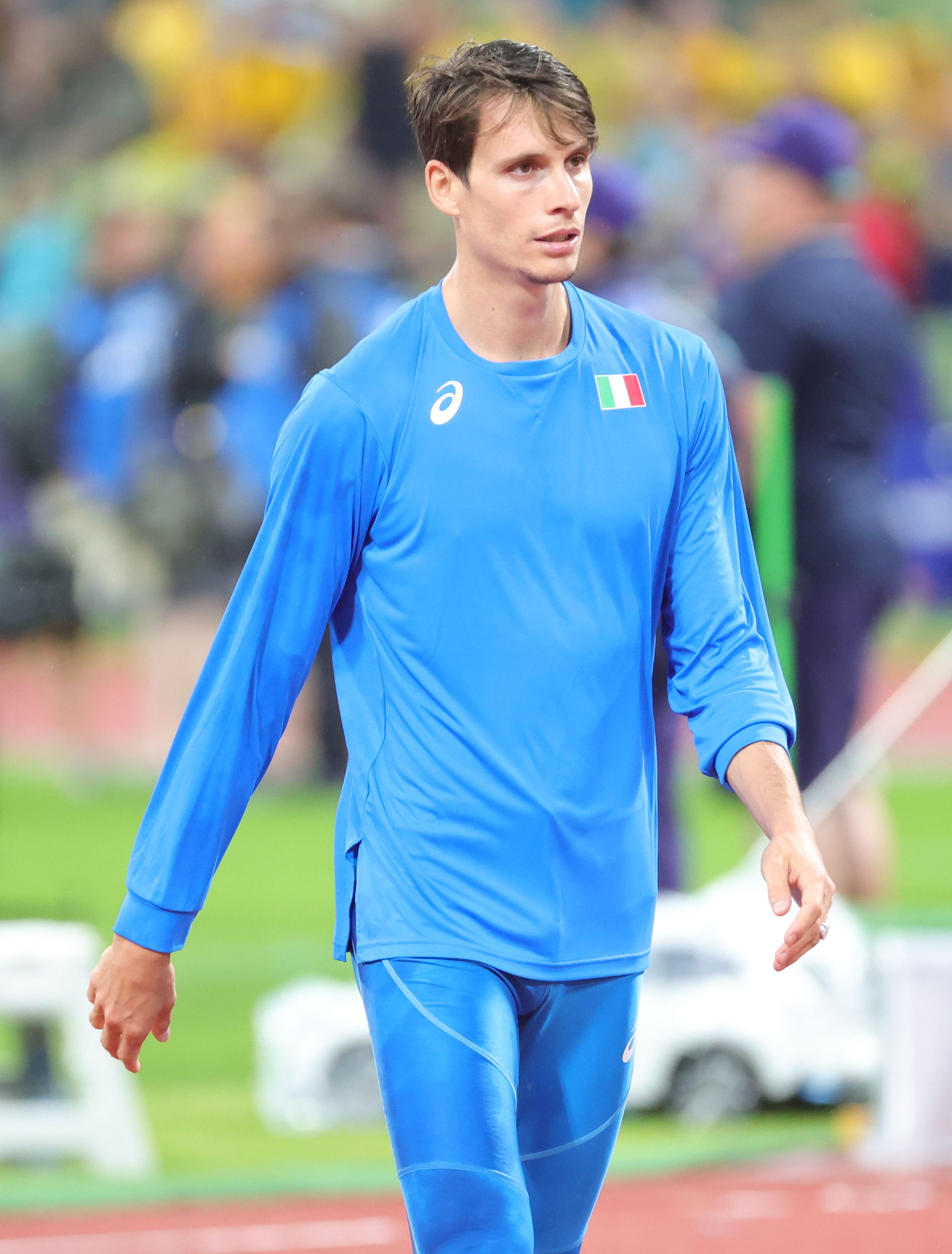
- Fassinotti training in 2022

Personal information
- Nationality: Italian
- Born: 29 April 1989 (age 37) Turin, Italy
- Education: University of Pisa
- Height: 1.92 m (6 ft 3 1/2 in)
- Weight: 71 kg (157 lb)

Sport
- Country: Italy
- Sport: Athletics
- Event: High jump
- Club: C.S. Aeronautica Militare

Achievements and titles
- Personal bests: High jump (outdoor): 2.33 m (2015); High jump (indoor): 2.35 m (2016)
Medal record
Summer Universiade
Silver medal – second place	2017 Taipei	High jump
Mediterranean Games
Bronze medal – third place	2018 Tarragona	High jump

Marco Fassinotti (born 29 April 1989 in Turin) is an Italian high jumper.

== Biography ==
He has a record of 2.29 m, obtained in Paris on 5 March 2011. He was a finalist (7th) at the World Junior Championships in Athletics in Bydgoszcz on 13 July 2008. After entering the sports group of Centro Sportivo Aeronautica Militare, he took part in the first European Championships in Barcelona 2010, reaching 9th place with 2.23 m. At the European indoor games of Paris in 2011, Fassinotti finished 6th, obtaining his personal best of 2.29 m. He trains at the Club Primo Nebiolo of Turin with the company SAFA.

== Personal life ==
Fassinotti is engaged to Australian high jumper Eleanor Patterson.

== National records ==
- High jump indoor: 2.34 ( (Italy) Ancona, 23 February 2014)

== Achievements ==
Year	Competition	Venue	Position	Notes
Representing Italy
2008	World Junior Championships	Bydgoszcz, Poland	7th	2.13 m
2009	Universiade	Belgrade, Serbia	4th	2.20 m
2009	European U23 Championships	Kaunas, Lithuania	6th	2.21 m
2010	European Championships	Barcelona, Spain	9th	2.23 m
2011	European Indoor Championships	Paris, France	6th	2.29 m
2011	European U23 Championships	Ostrava, Czech Republic	5th	2.21 m
2011	Universiade	Shenzhen, China	12th	2.18 m
2013	European Indoor Championships	Gothenburg, Sweden	13th (q)	2.23 m
2014	World Indoor Championships	Sopot, Poland	6th	2.29 m
2014	European Championships	Zürich, Switzerland	7th	2.26 m
2016	World Indoor Championships	Portland, United States	9th	2.25 m
2017	Universiade	Taipei, Taiwan	2nd	2.29 m
2018	Mediterranean Games	Tarragona, Spain	3rd	2.23 m
2018	European Championships	Berlin, Germany	13th (q)	2.21 m
2022	Mediterranean Games	Oran, Algeria	7th	2.19 m
2022	World Championships	Eugene, United States	16th (q)	2.25 m
2022	European Championships	Munich, Germany	1st (q)	2.21 m^{1}
2023	European Indoor Championships	Istanbul, Turkey	8th	2.19 m
2023	World Championships	Budapest, Hungary	12th	2.20 m
2024	European Championships	Rome, Italy	20th (q)	2.17 m

^{1}No mark in the final

== National titles ==
Fassinotti won seven national championships at individual senior level.

- Italian Athletics Championships
  - High jump: 2013, 2015, 2021, 2025 (4)
- Italian Athletics Indoor Championships
  - High jump: 2014, 2020, 2024 (3)

== See also ==
- Italian records in athletics
- Men's high jump Italian record progression
- Italian all-time top lists - High jump
- Italy at the 2010 European Athletics Championships
