= 2012 European Athletics Championships – Men's high jump =

Men's high jump at the European Athletics Championships

The men's high jump at the 2012 European Athletics Championships was held at the Helsinki Olympic Stadium on 27 and 29 June.

== Medalists ==
Gold	Robert Grabarz; Great Britain
Silver	Raivydas Stanys; Lithuania
Bronze	Mickaël Hanany; France

== Records ==
Standing records prior to the 2012 European Athletics Championships
World record	Javier Sotomayor (CUB)	2.45	Salamanca, Spain	27 July 1993
European record	Patrik Sjöberg (SWE)	2.42	Stockholm, Sweden	30 June 1987
Championship record	Andrey Silnov (RUS)	2.36	Gothenburg, Sweden	9 August 2006
World Leading	Ivan Ukhov (RUS)	2.37	Opole, Poland	6 June 2012
European Leading	Ivan Ukhov (RUS)	2.37	Opole, Poland	6 June 2012

== Schedule ==
Date	Time	Round
27 June 2012	18:10	Qualification
29 June 2012	18:40	Final

== Results ==
=== Qualification ===
Qualification: Qualification Performance 2.28 (Q) or at least 12 best performers advance to the final

Rank	Group	Athlete	Nationality	2.00	2.10	2.15	2.19	2.23	2.26	Result	Notes
1	B	Raivydas Stanys	Lithuania	–	o	o	o	o	o	2.26	q, SB
2	A	Sergey Mudrov	Russia	–	o	o	xo	xo	o	2.26	q, SB
3	B	Robert Grabarz	Great Britain	–	–	–	o	o	xxx	2.23	q
3	A	Jaroslav Bába	Czech Republic	–	–	o	o	o	xx–	2.23	q
3	A	Mickaël Hanany	France	–	o	o	o	o	xx–	2.23	q
6	A	Mihai Donisan	Romania	–	o	o	xo	o	xxx	2.23	q
7	A	Michal Kabelka	Slovakia	–	o	o	xxo	o	xx–	2.23	q, PB
8	B	Gianmarco Tamberi	Italy	–	o	xxo	xo	o	xx–	2.23	q
9	B	Bohdan Bondarenko	Ukraine	–	–	o	o	xo	xxx	2.23	q
10	A	Szymon Kiecana	Poland	–	o	xo	o	xo	xxx	2.23	q
10	A	Samson Oni	Great Britain	–	–	xo	o	xo	xxx	2.23	q
12	B	Eike Onnen	Germany	–	xo	o	o	xxo	xxx	2.23	q
13	B	Fabrice Saint-Jean	France	–	–	–	xxo	xxo	xxx	2.23	
13	B	Andriy Protsenko	Ukraine	–	o	xo	xo	xxo	xxx	2.23	
15	B	Miguel Ángel Sancho	Spain	o	o	xo	o	xxx		2.19	
16	A	Dmitry Kroyter	Israel	–	o	o	xo	xxx		2.19	
16	B	Konstadinos Baniotis	Greece	–	–	o	xo	xxx		2.19	
18	B	Osku Torro	Finland	–	–	xo	xo	xxx		2.19	
19	B	Peter Horák	Slovakia	o	o	xo	xxo	xxx		2.19	
20	A	Dmytro Dem'yanyuk	Ukraine	–	xxo	–	xxo	xxx		2.19	
21	A	Rožle Prezelj	Slovenia	–	o	o	xxx			2.15	
21	A	Viktor Ninov	Bulgaria	–	–	o	xxx			2.15	SB
21	A	Silvano Chesani	Italy	–	o	o	xxx			2.15	
21	A	Kyriakos Ioannou	Cyprus	–	–	o	–	xxx		2.15	
25	B	Karl Lumi	Estonia	o	o	xo	xxx			2.15	
26	A	Simón Siverio	Spain	–	o	xxo	xxx			2.15	
27	B	Marius Dumitrache	Romania	o	xo	xxo	xxx			2.15	
28	A	Tom Parsons	Great Britain	–	o	xxx				2.10	
28	A	Zurab Gogochuri	Georgia	o	o	xxx				2.10	
30	B	Olivér Harsányi	Hungary	o	xxo	xxx				2.10	
30	B	Dragutin Topić	Serbia	o	xxo	x				2.10	
32	B	Eugenio Rossi	San Marino	xxo	xxx					2.00	

=== Final ===
Rank	Athlete	Nationality	2.15	2.20	2.24	2.28	2.31	2.33	Result	Notes
1st place, gold medalist(s)	Robert Grabarz	Great Britain	–	–	o	o	xo	xxx	2.31	
2nd place, silver medalist(s)	Raivydas Stanys	Lithuania	o	xxo	o	xo	xo	xxx	2.31	PB
3rd place, bronze medalist(s)	Mickaël Hanany	France	o	o	o	xxo	xx		2.28	
4	Sergey Mudrov	Russia	o	o	xo	xxo	xxx		2.28	SB
5	Gianmarco Tamberi	Italy	o	o	o	xxx			2.24	
6	Michal Kabelka	Slovakia	o	xo	o	xxx			2.24	PB
6	Szymon Kiecana	Poland	o	xo	o	xxx			2.24	
8	Jaroslav Bába	Czech Republic	o	o	xo	xx–	x		2.24	
8	Mihai Donisan	Romania	o	o	xo	xxx			2.24	=SB
10	Eike Onnen	Germany	o	xo	xxx				2.20	
11	Bohdan Bondarenko	Ukraine	xo	–	xxx				2.15	
	Samson Oni	Great Britain	–	xxx					NM	
