= Wojciech Theiner =

Polish high jumper

Personal information
- Born: 25 June 1986 (age 40) Ruda Śląska, Poland
- Height: 1.89 m (6 ft 2 in)
- Weight: 84 kg (185 lb)

Sport
- Country: Poland
- Sport: Track and field
- Event: High jump

Wojciech Theiner (born 25 June 1986 in Ruda Śląska) is a Polish high jumper.

He finished fifth at the 2003 World Youth Championships, won the silver medal at the 2005 European Junior Championships and competed at the 2006 IAAF World Indoor Championships without reaching the final.

His personal best is 2.32 metres, achieved on 2 July 2014 in Katowice.

== Achievements ==
Year	Competition	Venue	Position	Event	Notes
Representing Poland
2003	World Youth Championships	Sherbrooke, Canada	5th	High jump	2.08 m
2005	European Junior Championships	Kaunas, Lithuania	2nd	High jump	2.21 m
2005	European Junior Championships	Kaunas, Lithuania	13th (q)	Long jump	7.35 m
2006	World Indoor Championships	Moscow, Russia	10th (q)	High jump	2.24 m
2010	European Championships	Barcelona, Spain	13th (q)	High jump	2.23 m
2011	Universiade	Shenzhen, China	2nd	High jump	2.26 m
2013	Universiade	Kazan, Russia	6th	High jump	2.25 m
2014	European Championships	Zürich, Switzerland	10th	High jump	2.26 m
2016	Olympic Games	Rio de Janeiro, Brazil	25th (q)	High jump	2.22 m
