= 2007 European Athletics U23 Championships – Men's high jump =

The men's high jump event at the 2007 European Athletics U23 Championships was held in Debrecen, Hungary, at Gyulai István Atlétikai Stadion on 15 July.

== Medalists ==
| Gold | Linus Thörnblad; Sweden |
| Silver | Benjamin Lauckner; Germany |
| Bronze | Jussi Viita; Finland |

== Results ==
=== Final ===
15 July

| Rank | Name | Nationality | Attempts | | | | | | | Result | Notes |
| Rank | Name | Nationality | 2.04 | 2.09 | 2.14 | 2.18 | 2.21 | 2.24 | 2.27 | Result | Notes |
|---|---|---|---|---|---|---|---|---|---|---|---|
| 1st place, gold medalist(s) | Linus Thörnblad | Sweden | – | – | o | o | o | xo | xxx | 2.24 | |
| 2nd place, silver medalist(s) | Benjamin Lauckner | Germany | o | – | o | o | o | xxx | | 2.21 | |
| 3rd place, bronze medalist(s) | Jussi Viita | Finland | o | o | xo | o | o | xxx | | 2.21 | |
| 4 | Radu Tucan | Moldova | o | o | o | o | xxo | xxx | | 2.21 | |
| 5 | Mickaël Diaz | France | o | o | o | xo | xxo | xxx | | 2.21 | |
| 6 | Michal Kabelka | Slovakia | xo | o | o | xo | xxo | xxx | | 2.21 | |
| 7 | Ivan Ilyichev | Russia | o | o | o | o | xxx | | | 2.18 | |
| 8 | Adam Scarr | United Kingdom | – | o | xo | o | xxx | | | 2.18 | |
| 9 | Niki Palli | Israel | – | o | xo | xxo | xxx | | | 2.18 | |
| 10 | Bogdan Popa | Romania | o | o | o | xxx | | | | 2.14 | |
| 11 | Jovan Vukičević | Serbia | xo | o | o | xxx | | | | 2.14 | |
| 12 | Konstadinos Baniotis | Greece | o | o | xxo | – | xxx | | | 2.14 | |
| 12 | Andrei Mîțîcov | Moldova | o | o | xxo | xxx | | | | 2.14 | |
| | Raivydas Stanys | Lithuania | xxx | | | | | | | NM | |

== Participation ==
According to an unofficial count, 14 athletes from 13 countries participated in the event.

- Finland (1)
- France (1)
- Germany (1)
- Greece (1)
- Israel (1)
- Lithuania (1)
- Moldova (2)
- Romania (1)
- Russia (1)
- Serbia (1)
- Slovakia (1)
- Sweden (1)
- United Kingdom (1)
