= Raivydas Stanys =

Lithuanian high jumper (born 1987)

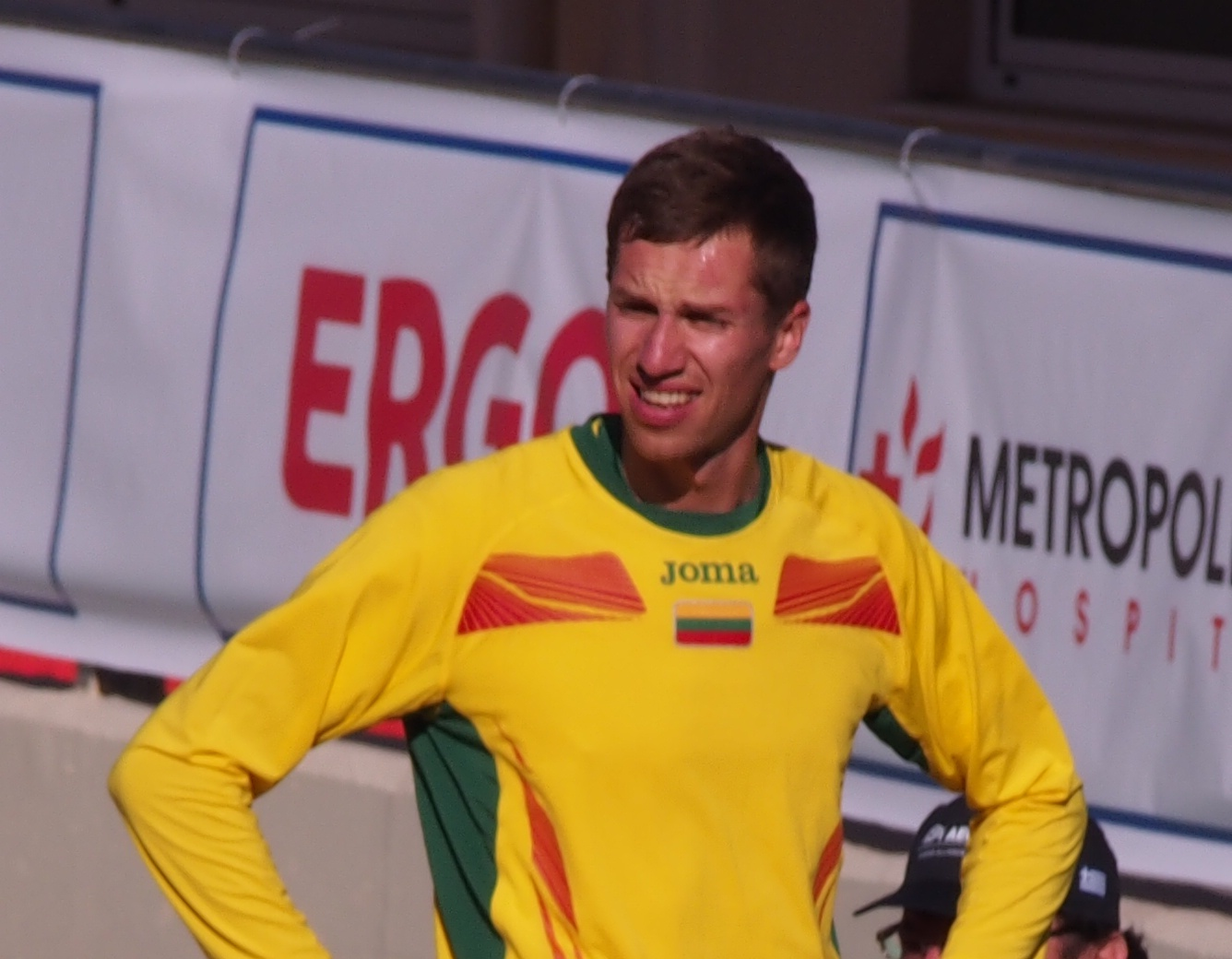
- Raivydas Stanys during 2015 European Team Championships First League

Personal information
- Born: February 3, 1987 (age 39)
- Height: 1.94 m (6 ft 4 1/2 in)
- Weight: 80 kg (176 lb)

Sport
- Country: Lithuania
- Sport: Athletics
- Event: High jump
Medal record
European Championships
| Silver medal – second place | 2012 Helsinki | High jump |
- Updated on 15 August 2012

Raivydas Stanys (born 3 February 1987, Rokiškis, Lithuania) is a Lithuanian former high jumper. His personal record is 2.31 metres.

He represented Lithuania in 2011 World Championships in Athletics and the 2015 World Championships.

== Competition record ==
| Year | Competition | Venue | Position | Notes |
|---|---|---|---|---|
| 2006 | World Junior Championships | Beijing, China | 20th (q) | 2.10 m |
| 2007 | European U23 Championships | Debrecen, Hungary | – | NM |
| 2009 | European Indoor Championships | Turin, Italy | 25th (q) | 2.17 m |
| 2009 | European U23 Championships | Kaunas, Lithuania | 8th | 2.21 m |
| 2011 | Universiade | Shenzhen, China | 5th | 2.24 m |
| 2011 | World Championships | Daegu, South Korea | 20th (q) | 2.25 m |
| 2012 | European Championships | Helsinki, Finland | 2nd | 2.31 m |
| 2012 | Olympic Games | London, United Kingdom | 27th (q) | 2.16 m |
| 2013 | Universiade | Kazan, Russia | 7th | 2.20 m |
| 2014 | European Championships | Zürich, Switzerland | 12th (q) | 2.19 m |
| 2015 | European Indoor Championships | Prague, Czech Republic | 20th (q) | 2.19 m |
| 2015 | Universiade | Gwangju, South Korea | 4th | 2.24 m |
| 2015 | World Championships | Beijing, China | — | NM |
| 2016 | European Championships | Amsterdam, Netherlands | 17th (q) | 2.23 m |
| 2017 | European Indoor Championships | Belgrade, Serbia | 15th (q) | 2.16 m |
