= Athletics at the 2016 Summer Olympics – Men's high jump =

Men's high jump at the Games of the XXXI Olympiad
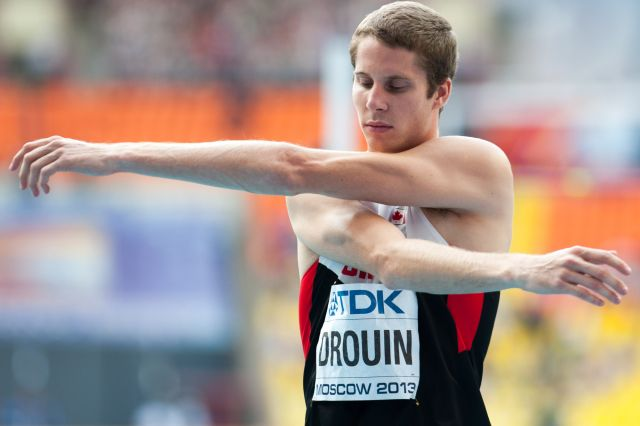
- Derek Drouin (2013)
- Venue: Olympic Stadium
- Dates: 14–16 August 2016
- Competitors: 44 from 28 nations
- Winning height: 2.38

Medalists
1st place, gold medalist(s)		Derek Drouin	Canada
2nd place, silver medalist(s)		Mutaz Essa Barshim	Qatar
3rd place, bronze medalist(s)		Bohdan Bondarenko	Ukraine

Official Video Highlights

The men's high jump competition at the 2016 Summer Olympics in Rio de Janeiro, Brazil was held at the Olympic Stadium between 14 and 16 August. Forty-four athletes from 28 nations competed. The event was won by Derek Drouin of Canada, the nation's first victory in the men's high jump since 1932 (and second overall). Drouin was the ninth man to win multiple medals in the high jump, after his 2012 silver. Mutaz Essa Barshim, who had tied Drouin for silver in 2012, was the tenth multiple medalist in the event. Barshim's silver was Qatar's fifth Olympic medal in any event, and the first better than bronze. Bohdan Bondarenko took bronze, Ukraine's first medal in the men's high jump.

== Background ==
This was the 28th appearance of the event, which is one of 12 athletics events to have been held at every Summer Olympics. The returning finalists from the 2012 Games were gold medalist Erik Kynard of the United States, all three silver medalists (Derek Drouin of Canada, Robert Grabarz of Great Britain, and Mutaz Essa Barshim of Qatar), sixth-place finisher Bohdan Bondarenko of Ukraine, seven-place finisher Michael Mason of Canada, eight-place finisher Andriy Protsenko of Ukraine, and twelve-place finisher Kyriakos Ioannou of Cyprus.

The 2012 Olympic champion Ivan Ukhov was absent as a result of the Russian team's ban for doping (he would later be stripped of the 2012 gold medal). Another major absence, due to injury, was Italy's Gianmarco Tamberi who ranked second in the world and had won the 2016 World Indoor Championships. The top ranked athlete with 2.40 metres was Qatar's Barshim, who won the 2012 Olympic bronze medal and had previously jumped 2.43 metres in competition in 2014, the second-highest clearance in history. Drouin, who shared the 2012 bronze with Barshim, was ranked third in the world in 2016 and was the winner at the 2015 World Championships. The 2015 silver and bronze medalists Bondarenko and Zhang Guowei, American Olympic medalist Kynard, and 31-year-old Donald Thomas of the Bahamas (ranked fourth), also qualified for the event. All those athletes, save for Zhang, advanced to the final.

San Marino made its debut in the event. The United States made its 27th appearance, most of any nation, having missed only the boycotted 1980 Games.

== Summary ==
Forty-four athletes competed in the qualification round, all, save for one, having achieved the Olympic qualifying mark of 2.29 metres. Eleven of those competitors cleared 2.29 metres to advance to the final, with an additional four who jumped 2.26 metres also advancing.

The opening height in the final was 2.20 m. Of the 15 men who qualified for the final, two failed to clear the next height, 2.25 m, and a further three were eliminated at 2.29 m. Six athletes remained clean through 2.29 m, having no misses on any of their attempts (though Bondarenko passed at the height). At 2.33 m, five competitors cleared on their initial attempt, four were eliminated and six remained in the competition. Barshim, Drouin, and Bondarenko remained clean at 2.33 m; Robert Grabarz and Andriy Protsenko also cleared 2.33 m on their first attempts, but both men had a single miss at earlier heights and were tied for fourth. Erik Kynard was in sixth place after taking three attempts to get over 2.33 m. Barshim and Drouin remained perfect at 2.36 m; Grabarz, Protsenko and Kynard were unable to advance while Bondarenko passed at the height. Barshim, Drouin and Bondarenko were now guaranteed medals, as Barshim and Drouin were the only ones over 2.36 m, and Bondarenko had fewer misses in the competition than the three others (besides Drouin, Barshim and himself) who had cleared 2.33 m. With the bar now set at 2.38 m (7 ft 9 1/2 in) , Drouin cleared on his first attempt. Barshim was unable to clear 2.38 m after three attempts, and was eliminated. Bondarenko failed twice to clear at the height and, following Barshim's second failure, he elected to pass his third attempt. With the bar raised to an Olympic-record height of 2.40 m, he hoped to clear and take the lead from Drouin, but he had only a single attempt. Jumping before Drouin, he failed at his attempt and Drouin won the competition, securing Canada's first gold medal in the event since 1932. Having won the gold medal, Drouin elected to attempt the height and thus set a new Olympic record. His single attempt was a failure and he decided to retire from the competition. Barshim received the silver medal and Bondarenko received the bronze.

The medals for the competition were presented by Samih Moudallal, Syria, member of the International Olympic Committee, and the gifts were presented by Dahlan Al Hamad, Vice President of the International Association of Athletics Federations.

== Qualification ==
A National Olympic Committee (NOC) could enter up to 3 qualified athletes in the men's high jump event if all athletes met the entry standard during the qualifying period. (The limit of 3 has been in place since the 1930 Olympic Congress.) The qualifying standard was 2.29 metres. The qualifying period was from 1 May 2015 to 11 July 2016. The qualifying distance standards could be obtained in various meets during the given period that have the approval of the IAAF. Both indoor and outdoor meets were accepted. NOCs could also use their universality place—each NOC could enter one male athlete regardless of time if they had no male athletes meeting the entry standard for an athletics event—in the high jump.

== Competition format ==
The competition consisted of two rounds, qualification and final. In qualification, each athlete had three attempts at each height and was eliminated if they had three consecutive failed attempts, either at one height, or over two (or even three) heights if they chose to pass after one or two failures at one height. Athletes who successfully jumped the qualifying height moved on to the final. If fewer than 12 reached that height, the best 12 moved on. Cleared heights reset for the final, which followed the same three-attempts-per-height format until all athletes recorded three consecutive failed attempts, save for the victor who could opt not to make any more attempts.

== Records ==
Prior to the competition, the existing world and Olympic records were as follows.

World record	Javier Sotomayor (CUB)	2.45	Salamanca, Spain	27 July 1993
Olympic record	Charles Austin (USA)	2.39	Atlanta, United States	27 July 1996

2016 World leading	Mutaz Essa Barshim (QAT)	2.40	Opole, Poland	11 June 2016

No new world or Olympic records were set during the competition.

== Schedule ==
All times are Brasilia Time (UTC-3)

Date	Time	Round
Sunday, 14 August 2016	20:30	Qualifying
Tuesday, 16 August 2016	20:30	Final

== Results ==
Key

- o = Height cleared
- x = Height failed
- – = Height passed
- r = Retired
- SB = Season's best
- PB = Personal best
- NR = National record
- AR = Area record
- OR = Olympic record
- WR = World record
- WL = World lead
- NM = No mark
- DNS = Did not start
- DQ = Disqualified

=== Qualifying round ===
Qualification rule: Qualifying performance 2.31 (Q) or at least 12 best performers (q) advance to the final. With only 11 athletes successfully clearing 2.29 metres, none of the jumpers attempted 2.31 metres.

Rank	Group	Athlete	Nation	2.17	2.22	2.26	2.29	Height	Notes
1	A	Mutaz Essa Barshim	Qatar	o	o	o	o	2.29	q
1	A	Bohdan Bondarenko	Ukraine	—	o	—	o	2.29	q
1	B	Derek Drouin	Canada	o	o	o	o	2.29	q
1	B	Tihomir Ivanov	Bulgaria	o	o	o	o	2.29	q, SB
5	B	Robert Grabarz	Great Britain	—	o	xo	o	2.29	q
5	B	Erik Kynard	United States	o	o	xo	o	2.29	q
7	B	Majd Eddin Ghazal	Syria	—	o	o	xo	2.29	q
7	A	Andriy Protsenko	Ukraine	o	o	o	xo	2.29	q
9	B	Donald Thomas	Bahamas	o	o	xo	xo	2.29	q
10	A	Trevor Barry	Bahamas	o	o	xo	xxo	2.29	q, SB
10	A	Brandon Starc	Australia	xo	o	o	xxo	2.29	q, SB
12	B	Jaroslav Bába	Czech Republic	o	o	o	xxx	2.26	q
12	A	Luis Castro	Puerto Rico	o	o	o	xxx	2.26	q
12	B	Dimitrios Chondrokoukis	Cyprus	o	o	o	xxx	2.26	q, SB
12	A	Kyriakos Ioannou	Cyprus	o	o	o	xxx	2.26	q
16	A	Chris Baker	Great Britain	xo	o	o	xxx	2.26	
17	A	Ricky Robertson	United States	o	o	xo	xxx	2.26	
18	A	Michael Mason	Canada	xo	o	xo	xxx	2.26	
18	B	Nauraj Singh Randhawa	Malaysia	xo	o	xo	xxx	2.26	
20	B	Dmytro Yakovenko	Ukraine	o	xxo	xo	xxx	2.26	SB
21	B	Bradley Adkins	United States	xxo	xo	xo	xxx	2.26	
22	A	Woo Sang-hyeok	South Korea	o	o	xxo	xxx	2.26	
23	B	David Adley Smith II	Puerto Rico	o	xo	xxo	xxx	2.26	
24	A	Eike Onnen	Germany	o	xxo	xxo	xxx	2.26	
25	A	Wojciech Theiner	Poland	o	o	xxx		2.22	
25	B	Jamal Wilson	Bahamas	o	o	xxx	—N/a	2.22	
25	B	Zhang Guowei	China	o	o	xxx	—N/a	2.22	
28	B	Mateusz Przybylko	Germany	xo	o	xxx	—N/a	2.22	
29	B	Arturo Chávez	Peru	xxo	o	xxx	—N/a	2.22	
30	B	Sylwester Bednarek	Poland	o	xo	xxx	—N/a	2.22	
30	A	Andrei Churyla	Belarus	o	xo	xxx	—N/a	2.22	
32	A	Wang Yu	China	xo	xo	xxx	—N/a	2.22	
33	A	Silvano Chesani	Italy	o	xxo	xxx	—N/a	2.22	
34	A	Konstadinos Baniotis	Greece	xo	xxo	xxx	—N/a	2.22	
35	A	Matúš Bubeník	Slovakia	o	xxx	—N/a		2.17	
35	A	Takashi Eto	Japan	o	xxx	—N/a		2.17	
35	A	Hsiang Chun-hsien	Chinese Taipei	o	xxx	—N/a		2.17	
35	B	Edgar Rivera	Mexico	o	xxx	—N/a		2.17	
35	A	Eugenio Rossi	San Marino	o	xxx	—N/a		2.17	
35	B	Talles Frederico Silva	Brazil	o	xxx	—N/a		2.17	
41	B	Joel Baden	Australia	xo	xxx	—N/a		2.17	
41	A	Dmitry Kroyter	Israel	xo	xxx	—N/a		2.17	
43	B	Dzmitry Nabokau	Belarus	xxo	xxx	—N/a		2.17	
43	B	Yun Seung-hyun	South Korea	xxo	xxx	—N/a		2.17	

=== Final ===
Rank	Athlete	Nation	2.20	2.25	2.29	2.33	2.36	2.38	2.40	Height	Notes
1st place, gold medalist(s)	Derek Drouin	Canada	o	o	o	o	o	o	x	2.38	
2nd place, silver medalist(s)	Mutaz Essa Barshim	Qatar	o	o	o	o	o	xxx	—N/a	2.36	
3rd place, bronze medalist(s)	Bohdan Bondarenko	Ukraine	–	o	–	o	–	xx–	x	2.33	
4	Robert Grabarz	Great Britain	o	xo	o	o	xxx	—N/a		2.33	=SB
4	Andriy Protsenko	Ukraine	o	o	xo	o	xxx	—N/a		2.33	SB
6	Erik Kynard	United States	o	xo	o	xxo	xxx	—N/a		2.33	
7	Majd Eddin Ghazal	Syria	o	o	o	xxx	—N/a			2.29	
7	Kyriakos Ioannou	Cyprus	o	o	o	xxx	—N/a			2.29	
7	Donald Thomas	Bahamas	o	o	o	xxx	—N/a			2.29	
10	Tihomir Ivanov	Bulgaria	o	xo	o	xxx	—N/a			2.29	=PB
11	Trevor Barry	Bahamas	o	o	xxx	—N/a				2.25	
12	Dimitrios Chondrokoukis	Cyprus	xo	o	xxx	—N/a				2.25	
13	Luis Castro	Puerto Rico	o	xxo	xxx	—N/a				2.25	
14	Jaroslav Bába	Czech Republic	o	xxx	—N/a					2.20	
15	Brandon Starc	Australia	xo	xxx	—N/a					2.20	
