= 2008 World Junior Championships in Athletics – Men's high jump =

The men's high jump event at the 2008 World Junior Championships in Athletics was held in Bydgoszcz, Poland, at Zawisza Stadium on 11 and 13 July.

== Medalists ==
Gold	Bohdan Bondarenko; Ukraine
Silver	Sylwester Bednarek; Poland
Bronze	Miguel Ángel Sancho; Spain

== Results ==
=== Final ===
13 July

Rank	Name	Nationality	Result	Notes
1st place, gold medalist(s)	Bohdan Bondarenko	Ukraine	2.26	
2nd place, silver medalist(s)	Sylwester Bednarek	Poland	2.24	
3rd place, bronze medalist(s)	Miguel Ángel Sancho	Spain	2.21	
4	Sergey Mudrov	Russia	2.17	
4	Ümit Tan	Turkey	2.17	
6	Adónios Mástoras	Greece	2.17	
7	Marco Fassinotti	Italy	2.13	
8	Raymond Higgs	Bahamas	2.13	
9	Matthew Owens	United Kingdom	2.13	
10	Giuseppe Carollo	Italy	2.08	
10	Naoto Tobe	Japan	2.08	
10	Edgar Rivera	Mexico	2.08	
10	Marius Dumitrace	Romania	2.08	
14	Karim Lotfy	Egypt	2.08	

=== Qualifications ===
11 July

==== Group A ====
Rank	Name	Nationality	Result	Notes
1	Raymond Higgs	Bahamas	2.14	q
1	Edgar Rivera	Mexico	2.14	q
1	Sylwester Bednarek	Poland	2.14	q
4	Matthew Owens	United Kingdom	2.14	q
5	Sergey Mudrov	Russia	2.14	q
6	Karim Lotfy	Egypt	2.14	q
6	Giuseppe Carollo	Italy	2.14	q
8	Naoto Tobe	Japan	2.14	q
9	Martinš Karabeško	Latvia	2.10	
10	Erik Kynard	United States	2.10	
11	Barry Pender	Ireland	2.05	
12	Enrique Gimeno	Spain	2.00	
	Lakshmanan Yogaraj	India	NH	

==== Group B ====
Rank	Name	Nationality	Result	Notes
1	Miguel Ángel Sancho	Spain	2.14	q
2	Marco Fassinotti	Italy	2.14	q
3	Bohdan Bondarenko	Ukraine	2.14	q
4	Marius Dumitrace	Romania	2.14	q
4	Ümit Tan	Turkey	2.14	q
6	Adónios Mástoras	Greece	2.14	q
7	Bartosz Krocz	Poland	2.10	
7	Willem Voigt	South Africa	2.10	
9	Dávid Fajoyomi	Hungary	2.10	
10	Tino Martin	Germany	2.10	
11	Ryan Fleck	United States	2.05	
	Shawn Swartz	Canada	NH	
	Miloš Petrovic	Serbia	NH	

== Participation ==
According to an unofficial count, 26 athletes from 22 countries participated in the event.

- Bahamas (1)
- Canada (1)
- Egypt (1)
- Germany (1)
- Greece (1)
- Hungary (1)
- India (1)
- Ireland (1)
- Italy (2)
- Japan (1)
- Latvia (1)
- Mexico (1)
- Poland (2)
- Romania (1)
- Russia (1)
- Serbia (1)
- South Africa (1)
- Spain (2)
- Turkey (1)
- Ukraine (1)
- United Kingdom (1)
- United States (2)
