= Mihai Donisan =

Romanian high jumper

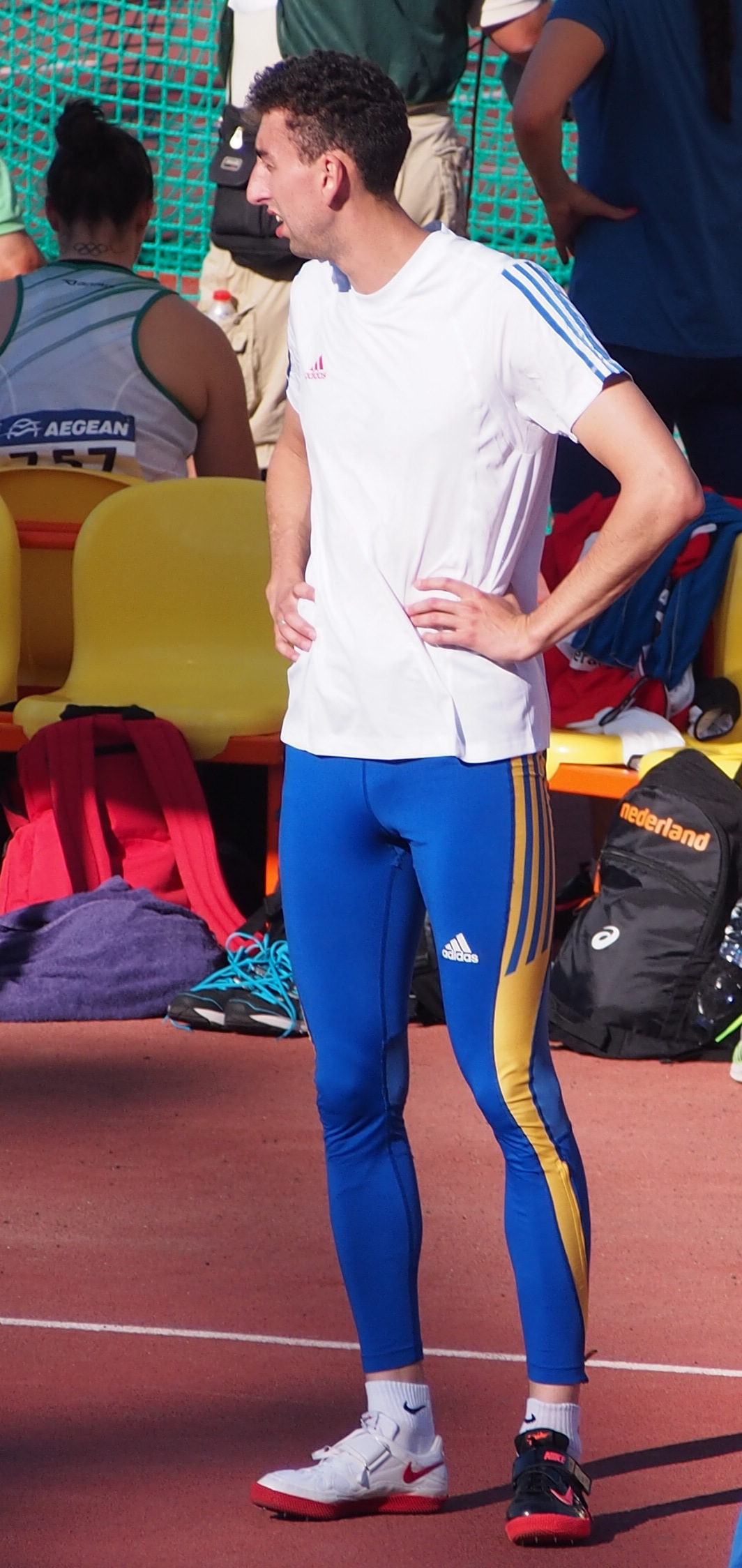
Mihai Donisan at the 2015 European Team Championships First League.

Mihai Donisan (born 24 July 1988) is a Romanian athlete specialising in the high jump. He won two medals at the Jeux de la Francophonie, gold in 2009 and silver in 2013.

He has personal bests of 2.31 metres outdoors (2013) and 2.30 metres indoors (2013). On 13 May 2016, he was banned for the use of an illegal substance meldonium and was banned for two years until 19 February 2018.

== Competition record ==
Year	Competition	Venue	Position	Notes
Representing Romania
2009	European U23 Championships	Kaunas, Lithuania	10th	2.18 m
2009	Jeux de la Francophonie	Beirut, Lebanon	1st	2.24 m
2010	European Championships	Barcelona, Spain	18th (q)	2.19 m
2011	Universiade	Shenzhen, China	15th (q)	2.15 m
2012	World Indoor Championships	Istanbul, Turkey	15th (q)	2.22 m
2012	European Championships	Helsinki, Finland	8th	2.24 m
2013	European Indoor Championships	Gothenburg, Sweden	15th (q)	2.18 m
2013	World Championships	Moscow, Russia	16th (q)	2.26 m
2013	Jeux de la Francophonie	Nice, France	2nd	2.30 m
2014	World Indoor Championships	Sopot, Poland	9th (q)	2.25 m
2014	European Championships	Zürich, Switzerland	11th	2.21 m
2015	European Indoor Championships	Prague, Czech Republic	9th (q)	2.24 m
2015	World Championships	Beijing, China	22nd (q)	2.26 m
