= Mickaël Hanany =

French high jumper

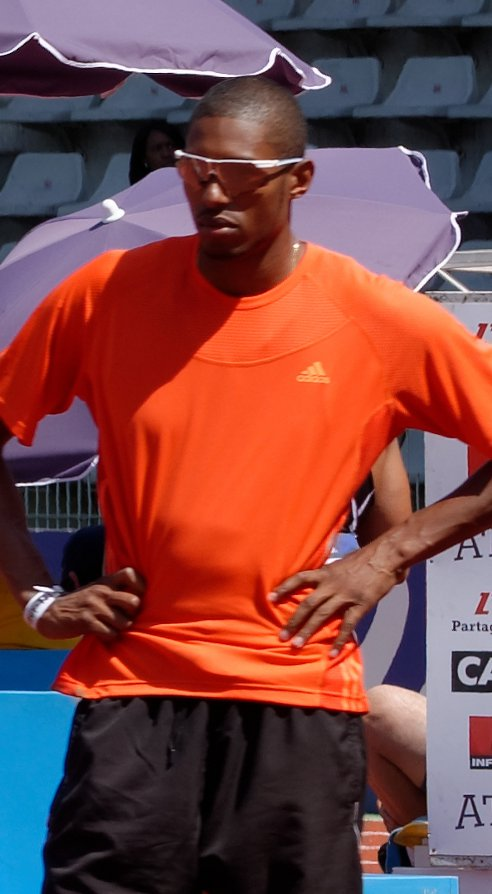
- Hanany in 2013

Personal information
- Born: 25 March 1983 (age 43) Vitry-sur-Seine, France
- Height: 1.98 m (6 ft 6 in)
- Weight: 88 kg (194 lb)

Sport
- Country: France
- Sport: Athletics
- Event: High jump
- University team: SMU Mustangs; UTEP Miners
- Now coaching: Mouhamadou Fall; Enhanced Games

Achievements and titles
- Olympic finals: 2012; High jump, 13th
- World finals: 2009; High jump, 5th
- Personal bests: High jump: 2.34 m NR; Long jump: 7.83 m Triple jump: 15.94 m
Medal record
Men's athletics
Representing France
European Athletics Championships
Bronze medal – third place	2012 Helsinki	High jump
NCAA Track and Field Championships
Gold medal – first place	2008 Des Moines	High jump
- Updated on 29 May 2026

Mickaël Hanany (born 25 March 1983, in Vitry-sur-Seine) is a French high jumper and national record holder in the event. He won the bronze medal at the 2012 European Championships in Helsinki. He competed in the 2008 and 2012 Summer Olympics as well as the 2005, 2009, and 2013 World Athletics Championships.

Hanany was an All-American jumper for SMU Mustangs track and field team, finishing 4th in the high jump at the 2004 NCAA Division I Outdoor Track and Field Championships. Following the disbanding of the Mustangs program, Hanany transferred to the UTEP Miners track and field team, where he won the high jump at the 2008 NCAA Division I Outdoor Track and Field Championships.

His personal best jump is 2.34 metres, achieved in 2014 in El Paso.

Hanany coaches Mouhamadou Fall. He was a track coach at the 2026 Enhanced Games.

== Competition record ==
Year	Competition	Venue	Position	Notes
Representing France
2000	World Junior Championships	Santiago, Chile	7th	2.10 m
2001	European Junior Championships	Grosseto, Italy	3rd	2.19 m
2002	European Indoor Championships	Vienna, Austria	27th (q)	2.12 m
2002	World Junior Championships	Kingston, Jamaica	15th (q)	2.15 m
2003	European U23 Championships	Bydgoszcz, Poland	7th	2.21 m
2005	Mediterranean Games	Almería, Spain	9th	2.14 m
2005	European U23 Championships	Erfurt, Germany	8th	2.23 m
2005	World Championships	Helsinki, Finland	16th (q)	2.24 m
2006	European Championships	Gothenburg, Sweden	21st (q)	2.19 m
2008	Olympic Games	London, United Kingdom	14th (q)	2.25 m
2009	World Championships	Berlin, Germany	5th	2.23 m
2012	European Championships	Helsinki, Finland	3rd	2.28 m
2012	Olympic Games	London, United Kingdom	14th	2.20 m
2013	European Indoor Championships	Gothenburg, Sweden	7th	2.23 m
2013	World Championships	Moscow, Russia	14th (q)	2.26 m
2013	Jeux de la Francophonie	Nice, France	2nd	2.30 m
2014	European Championships	Zürich, Switzerland	19th (q)	2.19 m
2018	Mediterranean Games	Tarragona, Spain	7th	2.10 m
