= Jaroslav Bába =

Czech high jumper (born 1984)

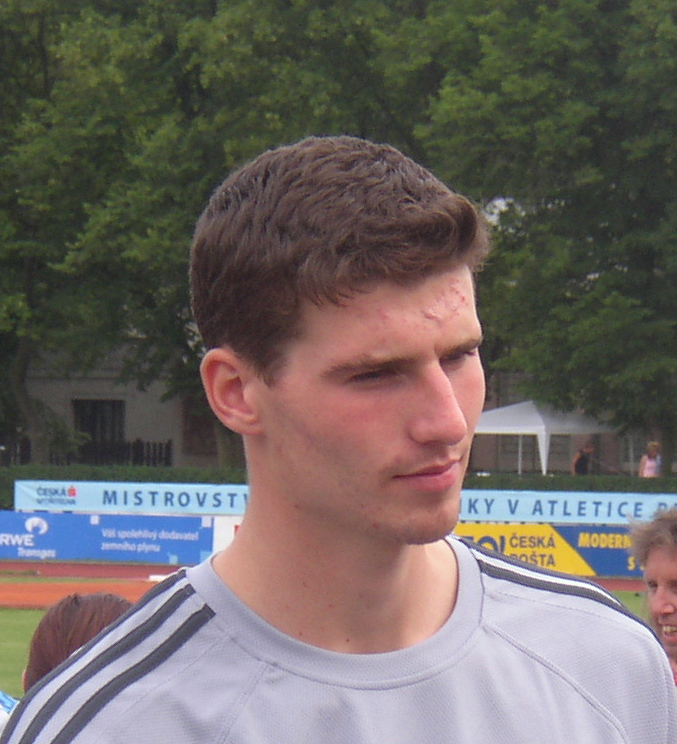
- Jaroslav Bába (2005)

Personal information
- Born: 2 September 1984 (age 42) Karviná, Czechoslovakia
- Height: 1.96 m (6 ft 5 in)
- Weight: 80 kg (176 lb)

Sport
- Country: Czech Republic
- Sport: Track and field
- Event: High jump
Medal record
Men's athletics
Representing Czech Republic
Olympic Games
Bronze medal – third place	2004 Athens	High jump
World Indoor Championships
Bronze medal – third place	2004 Budapest	High jump
European Indoor Championships
Silver medal – second place	2011 Paris	High jump
Bronze medal – third place	2013 Gothenburg	High jump
European U23 Championships
Gold medal – first place	2005 Erfurt	High jump

Jaroslav Bába (Czech pronunciation: [ˈjaroslav ˈbaːba]) (born 2 September 1984 in Karviná) is a Czech high jumper.

At the 2004 IAAF World Indoor Championships he jumped 2.25 metres, winning a joint bronze medal along with Germaine Mason and Ştefan Vasilache. In the same year he won the Olympic bronze medal with a jump of 2.34 m.

In 2005 he jumped a new personal best of 2.36 m in July in Rome, and later finished fifth at the World Championships. He had 2.37 m on the indoor track in Arnstadt from February of the same year. He did not compete in the 2006 season. During the summer of 2009 he spent several weeks in England to improve his English language skills.

== Achievements ==
Year	Competition	Venue	Position	Notes
Representing the Czech Republic
2002	World Junior Championships	Kingston, Jamaica	8th	2.18 m
2003	World Indoor Championships	Birmingham, United Kingdom	9th	2.25 m
2003	European Junior Championships	Tampere, Finland	1st	2.28 m
2003	World Championships	Paris, France	11th	2.25 m
2004	World Indoor Championships	Budapest, Hungary	3rd	2.25 m
2004	Olympic Games	Athens, Greece	3rd	2.34 m
2004	World Athletics Final	Monte Carlo, Monaco	7th	2.23 m
2005	European Indoor Championships	Madrid, Spain	4th	2.30 m
2005	European U23 Championships	Erfurt, Germany	1st	2.29 m
2005	World Championships	Helsinki, Finland	5th	2.29 m
2005	World Athletics Final	Monte Carlo, Monaco	7th	2.20 m
2007	World Championships	Osaka, Japan	8th	2.26 m
2008	World Indoor Championships	Valencia, Spain	9th	2.23 m
2008	Olympic Games	Beijing, China	6th	2.29 m
2009	European Indoor Championships	Turin, Italy	20th (q)	2.17 m
2009	World Championships	Berlin, Germany	5th	2.23 m
2010	World Indoor Championships	Doha, Qatar	11th (q)	2.23 m
2010	European Championships	Barcelona, Spain	5th	2.26 m
2011	European Indoor Championships	Paris, France	2nd	2.34 m
2011	European Team Championships	Stockholm, Sweden	3rd	2.28 m
2011	World Championships	Daegu, South Korea	4th	2.32 m
2012	World Indoor Championships	Istanbul, Turkey	13th (q)	2.22 m
2012	European Championships	Helsinki, Finland	8th	2.24 m
2012	Olympic Games	London, United Kingdom	21st (q)	2.21 m
2013	European Indoor Championships	Gothenburg, Sweden	3rd	2.31 m
2013	World Championships	Moscow, Russia	14th (q)	2.26 m
2014	European Championships	Zürich, Switzerland	3rd	2.30 m
2015	European Indoor Championships	Prague, Czech Republic	5th	2.28 m
2015	World Championships	Beijing, China	7th	2.29 m
2016	European Championships	Amsterdam, Netherlands	7th	2.24 m
2016	Olympic Games	Rio de Janeiro, Brazil	14th	2.20 m
