= Athletics at the 2012 Summer Olympics – Men's high jump =

Men's high jump at the Games of the XXX Olympiad
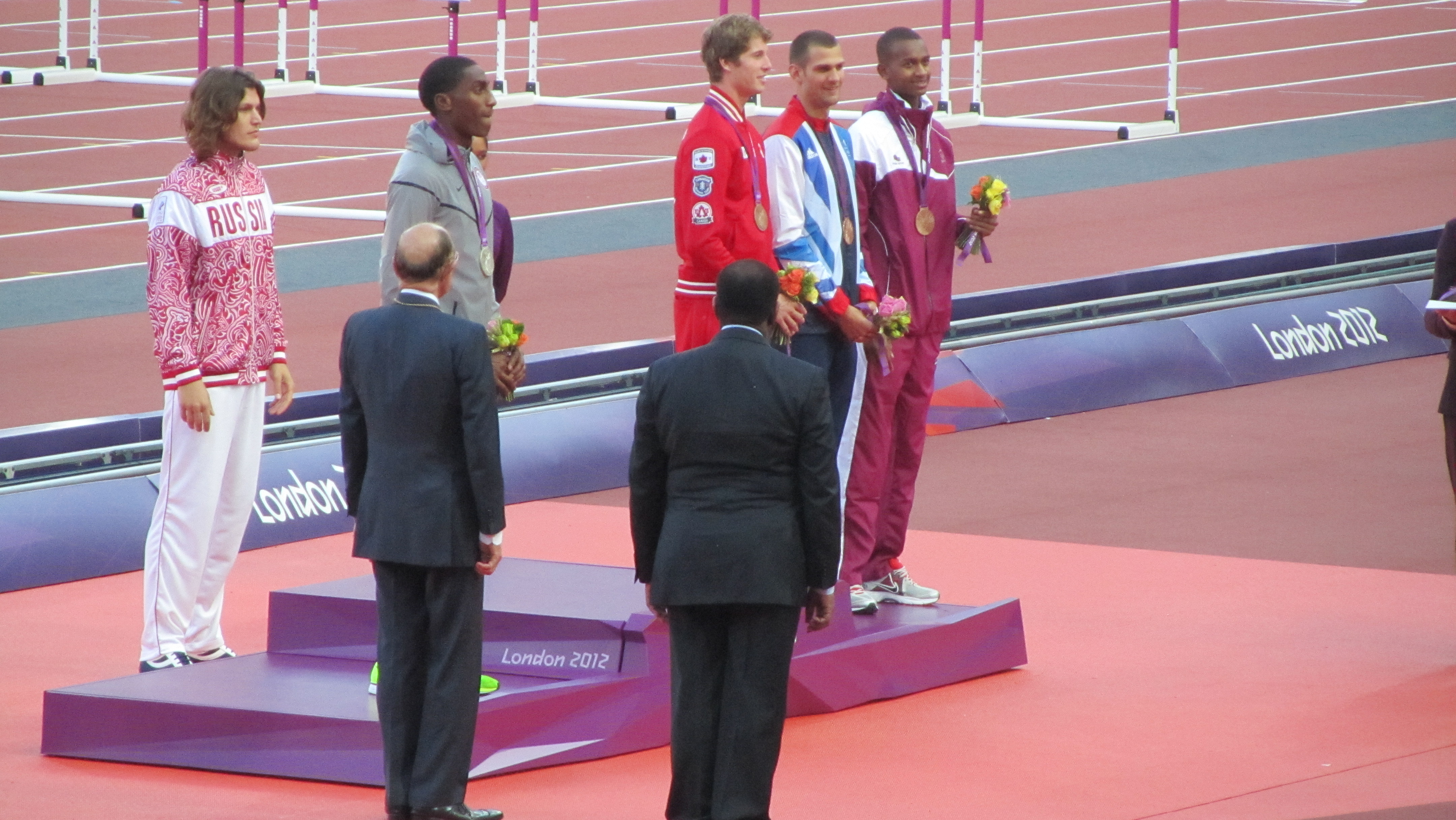
- Men's high jump victory ceremony — Ivan Ukhov was consequently stripped his gold medal for doping
- Venue: Olympic Stadium
- Date: 5–7 August
- Competitors: 35 from 27 nations
- Winning height: 2.33

Medalists
1st place, gold medalist(s)		Erik Kynard	United States
2nd place, silver medalist(s)		Derek Drouin	Canada
2nd place, silver medalist(s)		Robert Grabarz	Great Britain
2nd place, silver medalist(s)		Mutaz Essa Barshim	Qatar

Official video highlights

The men's high jump competition at the 2012 Summer Olympics in London, United Kingdom was held at the Olympic Stadium on 5–7 August. Thirty-five athletes from 27 nations competed. The event was won by Ivan Ukhov of Russia, the nation's second consecutive and third overall victory in the men's high jump. On February 1, 2019, Ukhov was stripped of the gold medal by the Court of Arbitration in Sport for doping offenses. Erik Kynard's silver returned the United States to the men's high jump podium after a one-Games absence. A three-way tie for third resulted in bronze medals for Derek Drouin (Canada's first medal in the event since hosting in Montreal 1976), Robert Grabarz (Great Britain's second consecutive podium appearance), and Mutaz Essa Barshim (Qatar's first medal in the event, first medal in athletics since 1992, and fourth overall Olympic medal). In 2021, the medals were reallocated; Kynard received the gold medal, while Drouin, Grabarz and Barshim were all promoted to the silver.

== Summary ==
In the qualifying round, nobody needed to take an attempt at the automatic qualifying mark because they were at a tie for the 12th qualifying position at 2.26 metres, with no misses before that height. Because there were two pits going on at the same time, they continued to 2.29 and half the field missed, two heights below the auto-qualifier. All the medalists came from those who made 2.29.

In the final, six athletes did not make it back to the qualifying height, including reigning world champion Jesse Williams and defending champion Andrey Silnov. Derek Drouin, Robert Grabarz and Mutaz Essa Barshim were clean through 2.29 and were in a three-way tie for first place. Erik Kynard cleared the next height at 2.33. Somehow between jumps, Ivan Ukhov had taken off his singlet and it got lost. As time clicked down, he pinned his number to a T-shirt and quickly took his jump at that height. It was successful, to move him into a tie for first place. After the other three had failed, Jamie Nieto made a strategic decision to take an all or nothing jump at 2.36. It was a close attempt, but he missed it.

Nieto finished in 6th, with a three-way tie for the bronze medal. Kynard missed at 2.36, but Ukhov, again in his singlet, cleared. With silver guaranteed, Kynard passed to 2.38 to try to win. He missed but Ukhov again cleared. Kynard again passed to 2.40 to try to win but he missed, keeping the silver, and Ukhov took the gold.

On 1 February 2019, it was announced on that all of Ivan Ukhov's results from 16 July 2012 to 31 December 2015 were being disqualified for doping.

== Background ==
This was the 27th appearance of the event, which is one of 12 athletics events to have been held at every Summer Olympics. The returning finalists from the 2008 Games were gold medalist Andrey Silnov of Russia, sixth-place finisher Jaroslav Bába of the Czech Republic, and twelfth-place finisher Rožle Prezelj of Slovenia. Dragutin Topić of Serbia was competing in his sixth Games. "This event had no clear favorite." Jesse Williams of the United States was the reigning world champion, but had struggled at the U.S. trials. Silnov had finished second at the Russian trials to Ivan Ukhov.

Ecuador and Saint Lucia each made their debut in the event. The United States made its 26th appearance, most of any nation, having missed only the boycotted 1980 Games.

== Qualification ==
A National Olympic Committee (NOC) could enter up to 3 qualified athletes in the men's high jump event if all athletes met the A standard, or 1 athlete if they met the B standard. The maximum number of athletes per nation had been set at 3 since the 1930 Olympic Congress. The qualifying height standards could be obtained in various meets during the qualifying period that had the approval of the IAAF. Both outdoor and indoor meets were eligible. The A standard for the 2012 men's high jump was 2.31 metres; the B standard was 2.28 metres. The qualifying period for was from 1 May 2011 to 8 July 2012. NOCs could also have an athlete enter the high jump through a universality place. NOCs could enter one male athlete in an athletics event, regardless of height, if they had no male athletes meeting the qualifying A or B standards in any men's athletic event.

== Competition format ==
The competition consisted of two rounds, qualification and final. In qualification, each athlete had three attempts at each height and was eliminated if they failed to clear any height. Athletes who successfully jumped the qualifying height moved on the final. If fewer than 12 reached that height, the best 12 moved on. Cleared heights reset for the final, which followed the same three-attempts-per-height format until all athletes reached a height they could not jump.

== Records ==
Prior to the competition, the existing world and Olympic records were as follows.

World record	Javier Sotomayor (CUB)	2.45	Salamanca, Spain	27 July 1993
Olympic record	Charles Austin (USA)	2.39	Atlanta, United States	27 July 1996

2012 World leading	Ivan Ukhov (RUS)	2.39 m	Cheboksary, Russia	5 July 2012

No new world or Olympic records were set for this event.

== Schedule ==
All times are British Summer Time (UTC+1)

Date	Time	Round
Sunday, 5 August 2012	19:05	Qualifying
Tuesday, 7 August 2012	19:00	Final

== Results ==
Key

- o = Height cleared
- x = Height failed
- – = Height passed
- r = Retired
- SB = Season's best
- PB = Personal best
- NR = National record
- AR = Area record
- OR = Olympic record
- WR = World record
- WL = World lead
- NM = No mark
- DNS = Did not start
- DQ = Disqualified

=== Qualifying ===
Qual. rule: qualification standard 2.32m (Q) or at least best 12 qualified (q). Only six athletes successfully cleared 2.29 metres, so none took attempts at 2.32 metres in the qualifying round.

Rank	Group	Athlete	Nation	2.16	2.21	2.26	2.29	Height	Note
1	B	Robert Grabarz	Great Britain	—	o	o	o	2.29	q
~~2~~	B	Ivan Ukhov	Russia	~~o~~	~~o~~	~~xo~~	~~o~~	~~2.29~~	q, DPG
3	A	Erik Kynard	United States	o	o	o	xo	2.29	q
3	B	Jesse Williams	United States	o	o	o	xo	2.29	q
5	B	Andriy Protsenko	Ukraine	o	xo	xo	xo	2.29	q
6	A	Derek Drouin	Canada	o	xxo	xo	xxo	2.29	q
7	B	Jamie Nieto	United States	o	o	o	xxx	2.26	q
8	A	Mutaz Essa Barshim	Qatar	o	o	xo	xx-	2.26	q
8	A	Bohdan Bondarenko	Ukraine	o	o	xo	xx-	2.26	q
8	A	Mickael Hanany	France	o	o	xo	xxx	2.26	q
8	A	Andrey Silnov	Russia	o	o	xo	xxx	2.26	q
12	A	Kyriakos Ioannou	Cyprus	o	o	xxo	xxx	2.26	q
12	B	Michael Mason	Canada	o	o	xxo	xxx	2.26	q
12	B	Wanner Miller	Colombia	o	o	xxo	xxx	2.26	q
15	A	Aleksandr Shustov	Russia	o	xo	xxo	xxx	2.26	
16	B	Trevor Barry	Bahamas	o	o	xxx	—N/a	2.21	
16	B	Guilherme Cobbo	Brazil	o	o	xxx	—N/a	2.21	
16	A	Dmytro Dem'yanyuk	Ukraine	o	o	xxx	—N/a	2.21	
16	A	Osku Torro	Finland	o	o	xxx	—N/a	2.21	
20	B	Víctor Moya	Cuba	xo	o	xx-	x	2.21	
21	B	Jaroslav Bába	Czech Republic	o	xo	xxx	—N/a	2.21	
21	B	Diego Ferrín	Ecuador	o	xo	xxx	—N/a	2.21	
21	B	Gianmarco Tamberi	Italy	o	xo	xxx	—N/a	2.21	
21	A	Zhang Guowei	China	o	xo	xxx	—N/a	2.21	
25	A	Konstadínos Baniótis	Greece	o	xxo	xxx	—N/a	2.21	
25	B	Rožle Prezelj	Slovenia	o	xxo	xxx	—N/a	2.21	
27	B	Raivydas Stanys	Lithuania	o	xxx	—N/a		2.16	
28	A	Majed Aldin Ghazal	Syria	xo	xxx	—N/a		2.16	
28	B	Viktor Ninov	Bulgaria	xo	xxx	—N/a		2.16	
30	A	Michal Kabelka	Slovakia	xxo	xxx	—N/a		2.16	
30	A	Lee Hup Wei	Malaysia	xxo	xxx	—N/a		2.16	
30	A	Donald Thomas	Bahamas	xxo	–	xxx	—N/a	2.16	
—	A	Andrei Churyla	Belarus	xxx	—N/a			NM	
—	A	Darvin Edwards	Saint Lucia	xxx	—N/a			NM	
—	B	Dragutin Topić	Serbia	xxx	—N/a			NM	

=== Final ===
Rank	Athlete	Nation	2.20	2.25	2.29	2.33	2.36	2.38	2.40	Height	Notes
1st place, gold medalist(s)	Erik Kynard	United States	o	xo	o	o	x-	x-	x	2.33	
2nd place, silver medalist(s)	Derek Drouin	Canada	o	o	o	xxx	—N/a			2.29	
2nd place, silver medalist(s)	Robert Grabarz	Great Britain	—	o	o	xxx	—N/a			2.29	
2nd place, silver medalist(s)	Mutaz Essa Barshim	Qatar	o	o	o	xxx	—N/a			2.29	
5	Jamie Nieto	United States	o	o	xo	xx-	x	—N/a		2.29	
6	Bohdan Bondarenko	Ukraine	xo	o	xo	xxx	—N/a			2.29	
7	Michael Mason	Canada	o	o	xxo	xxx	—N/a			2.29	
8	Wanner Miller	Colombia	o	o	xxx	—N/a				2.25	
8	Jesse Williams	United States	o	o	xxx	—N/a				2.25	
8	Andriy Protsenko	Ukraine	o	o	xxx	—N/a				2.25	
11	Andrey Silnov	Russia	o	xo	xxx	—N/a				2.25	
12	Kyriakos Ioannou	Cyprus	o	xxx	—N/a					2.20	
13	Mickael Hanany	France	xo	xxx	—N/a					2.20	
DSQ	Ivan Ukhov	Russia	~~o~~	~~o~~	~~xo~~	~~o~~	~~o~~	~~o~~	~~x~~	~~2.38~~	DSQ
