= 2009 European Athletics Indoor Championships – Men's high jump =

The Men's high jump event at the 2009 European Athletics Indoor Championships was held on March 6–7.

Ivan Ukhov won gold with Russia.

== Medalists ==
Gold	Silver	Bronze
Ivan Ukhov Russia	Kyriakos Ioannou Cyprus; Aleksey Dmitrik Russia	

== Results ==
=== Qualification ===
Qualification: Qualification Performance 2.30 (Q) or at least 8 best performers advanced to the final.

Rank	Group	Athlete	Nationality	2.12	2.17	2.22	2.27	2.30	Result	Notes
1	A	Ivan Ukhov	Russia	–	o	o	o	o	2.30	Q
2	A	Raul Spank	Germany	x–	o	o	o	o	2.30	Q, =PB
3	A	Kyriakos Ioannou	Cyprus	–	o	o	xxo	xo	2.30	Q, SB
3	B	Aleksey Dmitrik	Russia	o	o	o	xxo	xo	2.30	Q, =SB
5	A	Filippo Campioli	Italy	–	o	o	xxo	xxo	2.30	Q, =PB
6	B	Dragutin Topić	Serbia	–	o	o	o	–	2.27	q
7	A	Konstadinos Baniotis	Greece	o	o	xo	o	xxx	2.27	q, =PB
8	B	Aleksandr Shustov	Russia	o	o	xo	xo	xxx	2.27	q
8	B	Bohdan Bondarenko	Ukraine	o	o	xo	xo	xx–	2.27	q, =PB
10	A	Nicola Ciotti	Italy	o	o	xo	xxo	xxx	2.27	
11	B	Michal Kabelka	Slovakia	o	o	o	xxx		2.22	
12	B	Samson Oni	Great Britain	o	xo	o	xxx		2.22	
13	B	Viktor Shapoval	Ukraine	o	xxo	o	xxx		2.22	
14	B	Sylwester Bednarek	Poland	o	o	xo	xxx		2.22	
15	A	Oleksandr Nartov	Ukraine	o	xo	xo	xxx		2.22	
16	B	Martyn Bernard	Great Britain	o	o	xxo	xxx		2.22	
16	B	Andrea Bettinelli	Italy	o	o	xxo	xxx		2.22	
18	A	Javier Bermejo	Spain	o	xo	xxo	xxx		2.22	
19	B	Miguel Ángel Sancho	Spain	o	xxo	xxo	xxx		2.22	
20	A	Martijn Nuyens	Netherlands	o	o	xxx			2.17	
20	A	Jaroslav Bába	Czech Republic	o	o	xxx			2.17	
20	A	Artsiom Zaitsau	Belarus	o	o	xxx			2.17	
20	B	Linus Thörnblad	Sweden	o	o	xxx			2.17	
20	B	Peter Horák	Slovakia	o	o	xxx			2.17	
25	B	Raivydas Stanys	Lithuania	xxo	o	xxx			2.17	
26	B	Andrei Mîtîcov	Moldova	o	xo	xxx			2.17	SB
27	A	Martin Kalafus	Slovakia	o	xxo	xxx			2.17	
27	A	Abdoulaye Diarra	France	o	xxo	xxx			2.17	
27	B	Tim Riedel	Germany	o	xxo	xxx			2.17	
30	A	Normunds Pupols	Latvia	xo	xxx				2.12	

=== Final ===
Rank	Athlete	Nationality	2.15	2.20	2.25	2.29	2.32	Result	Notes
1st place, gold medalist(s)	Ivan Ukhov	Russia	o	o	x–	o	o	2.32	
2nd place, silver medalist(s)	Kyriakos Ioannou	Cyprus	–	o	o	o	xxx	2.29	
2nd place, silver medalist(s)	Aleksey Dmitrik	Russia	o	o	o	o	xxx	2.29	
4	Aleksandr Shustov	Russia	-	o	o	xo	xxx	2.29	
4	Filippo Campioli	Italy	o	o	o	xo	xxx	2.29	
6	Konstadinos Baniotis	Greece	o	o	o	xxo	xxx	2.29	PB
7	Raul Spank	Germany	–	o	xo	xx–	x	2.25	
8	Dragutin Topić	Serbia	–	x–	xo	xx–	x	2.25	
9	Bohdan Bondarenko	Ukraine	o	xo	xxx			2.20	
