= Banskobystrická latka =

Slovakian High Jump Competition

The Banskobystrická latka is an annual indoor high jump competition which takes place at the Štiavničky Sport Hall in Banská Bystrica, Slovakia. It was formerly known as the Europa SC High Jump due to sponsorship by the Europa Shopping Center, the city's main shopping mall.

== History ==
The event was established in 1993 by a group of athletics enthusiasts, including Ľubomír Roško, Július Nyárjas, Róbert Ruffíni, and Robert Rozim. The first edition was held in the city's Štiavničkách Sports Hall and saw Šárka Kašpárková win the women's contest with a Czech record of 1.95 metres. The competition quickly attracted a high calibre of European competitors: Dalton Grant won the second men's competition prior to his victory at the 1994 European Athletics Indoor Championships and Sorin Matei set a meet record of 2.36 m at the third edition.

The meeting was not held in 2002. Stefan Holm was the winner of the 10th edition in 2003 with a jump of 2.34 m and he went on to take his second World Indoor title two months later. Holm repeated his clearance to win the year after – the same year he became Olympic champion. Blanka Vlašić raised the women's meet record to 2.05 m which was a Croatian record and made her the fourth best indoor jumper ever at the time. In the men's contest that year Andrey Sokolovskiy equalled the meet record of 2.36 m and Kyriakos Ioannou cleared a Cypriot record of 2.30 m in third place. In 2007 Holm took his third career victory with a meet record of 2.37 m and also managed to clear the 2.30 m mark for the 100th time in his competitive career. Venelina Veneva won the women's jump in 2.02 m, but was later disqualified for doping. Runner-up Antonietta Di Martino broke the Italian record with her two-metre jump.

At the 2009 edition both Linus Thörnblad and Jesse Williams cleared 2.36 m, which made them joint second best in the world that year. Russia's Ivan Ukhov broke the meet record with a jump of 2.38 m in 2010 and repeated the feat in 2011 – both marks were the best indoor performances that year. Vlašić took her fourth career victory in 2.04 m in 2010 and Di Martino improved her Italian record to that standard in 2011.

== Past winners ==
Key: Meeting record

Past winners of the Banskobystrická latka
Ed.	Year	Men's winner	Mark (m)	Women's winner	Mark (m)
1st	1993	Eugen-Cristian Popescu (ROM)	2.24	Šárka Kašpárková (CZE)	1.95
2nd	1994	Dalton Grant (GBR)	2.32	Iryna Mykhalchenko (UKR)	1.96
3rd	1995	Sorin Matei (ROM)	2.36	Tatyana Motkova (RUS)	2.00
4th	1996	Yuriy Sergiyenko (UKR)	2.25	Monika Gollner (AUT)	1.92
5th	1997	Patrik Sjöberg (SWE)	2.28	Mária Melová-Henkel (SVK)	1.96
6th	1998	Artur Partyka (POL)	2.31	Yelena Gulyayeva (RUS)	1.96
7th	1999	Jan Janků (CZE)	2.28	Mária Melová-Henkel (SVK)	1.95
8th	2000	Gennadiy Morozov (BLR)	2.22	Vita Palamar (UKR)	1.88
9th	2001	Sergey Dymchenko (UKR)	2.31	Not held	—
—	2002	Not held	—	Not held	—
10th	2003	Stefan Holm (SWE)	2.34	Not held	—
11th	2004	Stefan Holm (SWE)	2.34	Not held	—
12th	2005	Jaroslav Bába (CZE)	2.33	Not held	—
13th	2006	Andriy Sokolovskyy (UKR)	2.36	Blanka Vlašić (CRO)	2.05
14th	2007	Stefan Holm (SWE)	2.37	Venelina Veneva (BUL) ^{†}	2.02
15th	2008	Stefan Holm (SWE)	2.34	Blanka Vlašić (CRO)	2.04
16th	2009	Linus Thörnblad (SWE)	2.36	Blanka Vlašić (CRO)	2.00
17th	2010	Ivan Ukhov (RUS)	2.38	Blanka Vlašić (CRO)	2.04
18th	2011	Ivan Ukhov (RUS)	2.38	Antonietta Di Martino (ITA)	2.04
19th	2012	Ivan Ukhov (RUS)	2.33	Anna Chicherova (RUS)	2.00
20th	2013	Mutaz Essa Barshim (QAT)	2.36	Not held	—
—	2014	Lukas Beer (SVK)	2.24	Not held	—
21st	2015	Mutaz Essa Barshim (QAT)	2.40	Alessia Trost (ITA)	1.96
22nd	2016	Gianmarco Tamberi (ITA)	2.35	Doreen Amata (NGR)	1.93
23rd	2017	Derek Drouin (CAN) - Sylwester Bednarek (POL)	2.33	Iryna Gerashchenko (UKR)	1.93
24th	2018	Yu Wang (CHN)	2.31	Mariya Lasitskene (RUS)	2.02
25th	2019	Naoto Tobe (JPN)	2.33	Mariya Lasitskene (RUS)	2.00
26th	2020	Luis Enrique Zayas (CUB)	2.33	Yaroslava Mahuchikh (UKR)	1.96
27th	2021	Gianmarco Tamberi (ITA)	2.31	Yaroslava Mahuchikh (UKR)	2.06
28th	2022	Woo Sang-hyeok (KOR)	2.35	Eleanor Patterson (AUS)	1.99
29th	2023	Hamish Kerr (NZ)	2.34	Yaroslava Mahuchikh (UKR)	1.97
30th	2024	Woo Sang-hyeok (KOR)	2.32	Angelina Topić (SRB)	1.97

- ^{†} = Later disqualified for doping. Antonietta Di Martino was the runner-up with 2.00 m.

== Statistics ==
=== Multiple winners ===
==== Men ====
Pos.	Men	Wins
1	(Sweden) Stefan Holm	4
2	(Russia) Ivan Ukhov	3
3	(Italy) Gianmarco Tamberi (Qatar) Mutaz Essa Barshim (South Korea) Woo Sang-hyeok	2

==== Women ====
Pos.	Women	Wins
1	(Croatia) Blanka Vlašić	4
2	(Ukraine) Yaroslava Mahuchikh	3
3	(Russia) Mariya Lasitskene (Slovakia) Mária Melová-Henkel	2

=== Winners by country ===
Pos.	Country	Men's race	Women's race	Total
1	Ukraine	3	6	9
2	Russia	3	5	8
3	Sweden	6	0	6
4	Italy	2	2	4
5	Croatia	0	3	3
-	Czech Republic	2	1	3
-	Slovakia	1	2	3
8	Qatar	2	0	2
-	Romania	2	0	2
-	Poland	2	0	2
-	South Korea	2	0	2
12	Belarus	1	0	1
-	Great Britain	1	0	1
-	Canada	1	0	1
-	China	1	0	1
-	Japan	1	0	1
-	Nigeria	0	1	1
-	Cuba	1	0	1
-	Austria	0	1	1
-	New Zealand	1	0	1
-	Serbia	0	1	1
22	Bulgaria	0	1†	1†

- ^{†} = Later disqualified for doping. Italy was the runner-up with 2.00 m.

== See also ==
- Moravia High Jump Tour – indoor competition(s) held in the Czech Republic in late January
