= 2011 European Athletics Indoor Championships – Men's high jump =

The Men's high jump event at the 2011 European Athletics Indoor Championships was held at March 4–5, 2011 with the final being held on March 5 at 14:30 local time.

== Records ==
Standing records prior to the 2011 European Athletics Indoor Championships
| World record | Javier Sotomayor (CUB) | 2.43 | Budapest, Hungary | 4 March 1989 |
| European record | Carlo Thränhardt (FRG) | 2.42 | West Berlin, West Germany | 26 February 1988 |
| Championship record | Stefan Holm (SWE) | 2.40 | Madrid, Spain | 6 March 2005 |
| World Leading | Ivan Ukhov (RUS) | 2.38 | Hustopeče, Czech Republic | 29 January 2011 |
| World Leading | Ivan Ukhov (RUS) | 2.38 | Banská Bystrica, Slovakia | 9 February 2011 |
| European Leading | Ivan Ukhov (RUS) | 2.38 | Hustopeče, Czech Republic | 29 January 2011 |
| European Leading | Ivan Ukhov (RUS) | 2.38 | Banská Bystrica, Slovakia | 9 February 2011 |

== Results ==
=== Qualification ===
Qualification: Qualification Performance 2.30 (Q) or at least 8 best performers advanced to the final. It was held at 16:00.

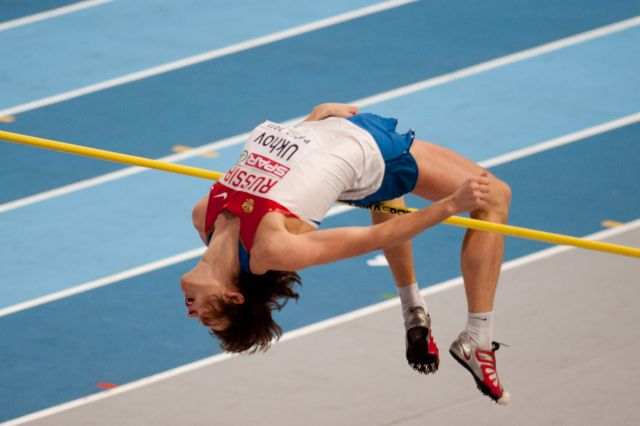
Ukhov soars to gold.

| Rank | Athlete | Nationality | 2.12 | 2.17 | 2.22 | 2.27 | 2.30 | Result | Notes |
|---|---|---|---|---|---|---|---|---|---|
| 1 | Jaroslav Bába | Czech Republic | – | o | o | o | – | 2.27 | q |
| 1 | Konstadinos Baniotis | Greece | o | o | o | o | – | 2.27 | q |
| 1 | Dimitrios Chondrokoukis | Greece | o | o | o | o | – | 2.27 | q, =PB |
| 1 | Janick Klausen | Denmark | o | o | o | o | x– | 2.27 | q, =NR |
| 1 | Aleksandr Shustov | Russia | – | o | o | o | – | 2.27 | q |
| 1 | Ivan Ukhov | Russia | – | o | o | o | x– | 2.27 | q |
| 7 | Marco Fassinotti | Italy | o | o | o | xo | x– | 2.27 | q, PB |
| 7 | Raúl Spank | Germany | – | o | o | xo | – | 2.27 | q |
| 9 | Nicola Ciotti | Italy | o | o | o | xxx | | 2.22 | |
| 9 | Tom Parsons | Great Britain | o | o | o | xxx | | 2.22 | |
| 9 | Rožle Prezelj | Slovenia | o | o | o | xxx | | 2.22 | |
| 9 | Artsiom Zaitsau | Belarus | o | o | o | xxx | | 2.22 | =SB |
| 13 | Viktor Ninov | Bulgaria | – | o | xo | xxx | | 2.22 | |
| 13 | Osku Torro | Finland | – | o | xo | xx– | | 2.22 | |
| 13 | Jussi Viita | Finland | o | o | xo | xxx | | 2.22 | |
| 16 | Tomislav Popek | Croatia | o | xo | xo | xxx | | 2.22 | PB |
| 17 | Dmytro Dem'yanyuk | Ukraine | xo | xo | xo | xxx | | 2.22 | |
| 18 | Oleksandr Nartov | Ukraine | o | o | xx– | | | 2.17 | |
| 18 | Peter Horák | Slovakia | o | o | xxx | | | 2.17 | |
| 18 | Dmitriy Kroyter | Israel | o | o | xxx | | | 2.17 | |
| 18 | Sergey Mudrov | Russia | – | o | xxx | | | 2.17 | |
| 22 | Normunds Pūpols | Latvia | xo | o | xxx | | | 2.17 | |
| 23 | Robbie Grabarz | Great Britain | o | xxx | | | | 2.12 | |

=== Final ===
The final was held at 16:00.

| Rank | Athlete | Nationality | 2.15 | 2.20 | 2.25 | 2.29 | 2.32 | 2.34 | 2.36 | 2.38 | 2.40 | 2.44 | Result | Notes |
|---|---|---|---|---|---|---|---|---|---|---|---|---|---|---|
| 1st place, gold medalist(s) | Ivan Ukhov | Russia | – | o | o | xo | o | o | o | o | – | xxx | 2.38 | =WL, =EL |
| 2nd place, silver medalist(s) | Jaroslav Bába | Czech Republic | o | o | o | o | o | o | x– | x– | x | | 2.34 | SB |
| 3rd place, bronze medalist(s) | Aleksandr Shustov | Russia | – | o | o | xo | xo | xxo | xxx | | | | 2.34 | PB |
| 4 | Konstadinos Baniotis | Greece | o | o | o | xo | xxo | xxx | | | | | 2.32 | PB |
| 5 | Dimitrios Chondrokoukis | Greece | o | o | o | xo | xxx | | | | | | 2.29 | PB |
| 6 | Marco Fassinotti | Italy | xxo | o | xo | xo | xxx | | | | | | 2.29 | PB |
| 7 | Janick Klausen | Denmark | o | o | o | xxx | | | | | | | 2.25 | |
| 8 | Raúl Spank | Germany | – | o | xxx | | | | | | | | 2.20 | |
