= 2005 European Athletics U23 Championships – Men's high jump =

The men's high jump event at the 2005 European Athletics U23 Championships was held in Erfurt, Germany, at Steigerwaldstadion on 15 and 17 July.

== Medalists ==
Gold	Jaroslav Bába; Czech Republic
Silver	Artsiom Zaitsau; Belarus
Bronze	Yuriy Krymarenko; Ukraine

== Results ==
=== 17 July Final ===
Rank	Name	Nationality	Attempts									Result	Notes
Rank	Name	Nationality	2.10	2.15	2.18	2.21	2.23	2.25	2.27	2.29	2.33	Result	Notes
1st place, gold medalist(s)	Jaroslav Bába	Czech Republic	–	–	xo	o	–	xo	xo	xxo	xxx	2.29	
2nd place, silver medalist(s)	Artsiom Zaitsau	Belarus	–	o	–	o	xxo	xx	o	xxx		2.27	
3rd place, bronze medalist(s)	Yuriy Krymarenko	Ukraine	o	o	xo	o	–	o	xo	xxx		2.27	
4	Kyriakos Ioannou	Cyprus	o	o	o	–	–	ox	xo	xxx		2.27	
5	Matthias Haverney	Germany	o	o	o	o	o	o	xxx			2.25	
6	Aleksey Dmitrik	Russia	o	xo	o	xo	–	o	xxx			2.25	
7	Michał Bieniek	Poland	–	–	o	–	o	–	xxx			2.23	
8	Mickaël Hanany	France	–	xo	–	xxo	o	xxx				2.23	
9	Andrey Silnov	Russia	–	o	o	o	xo	xxx				2.23	
10	Linus Thörnblad	Sweden	o	o	–	o	–	xxx				2.21	
11	Martyn Bernard	United Kingdom	–	o	xo	o	–	xxx				2.21	
12	Aleksandr Shustov	Russia	o	o	xxx							2.15	
13	Zoltán Vaskó	Hungary	o	xxx								2.10	
13	Artem Kozbanov	Ukraine	o	xxx								2.10	

=== Group A ===
Rank	Name	Nationality	Result	Notes
1	Michał Bieniek	Poland	2.21	Q
1	Aleksandr Shustov	Russia	2.21	Q
3	Kyriakos Ioannou	Cyprus	2.21	Q
3	Martyn Bernard	United Kingdom	2.21	Q
3	Aleksey Dmitrik	Russia	2.21	Q
6	Artem Kozbanov	Ukraine	2.21	Q
7	Linus Thörnblad	Sweden	2.21	Q
8	Stefan Häfner	Germany	2.18	
9	Stéphane Toinon	France	2.18	
10	Normunds Pūpols	Latvia	2.18	
11	Michal Kabelka	Slovakia	2.18	
12	Hervé Paris	France	2.15	
13	Stijn Stroobants	Belgium	2.15	
14	Siarhei Haliashou	Belarus	2.10	
	Radosław Struzik	Poland	NM	

==== Group B ====
Rank	Name	Nationality	Result	Notes
1	Andrey Silnov	Russia	2.21	Q
2	Jaroslav Bába	Czech Republic	2.21	Q
2	Mickaël Hanany	France	2.21	Q
2	Matthias Haverney	Germany	2.21	Q
5	Yuriy Krymarenko	Ukraine	2.21	Q
6	Artsiom Zaitsau	Belarus	2.21	Q
7	Zoltán Vaskó	Hungary	2.21	Q
8	Rainer Piirimets	Estonia	2.18	
9	Tom Parsons	United Kingdom	2.18	
9	Peter Horák	Slovakia	2.18	
11	Matthias Franta	Germany	2.15	
12	Joel Spolén	Sweden	2.15	
13	Marios Iacovou	Cyprus	2.10	
14	Grzegorz Bałkowiec	Poland	2.05	

== Participation ==
According to an unofficial count, 29 athletes from 15 countries participated in the event.

- Belarus (2)
- Belgium (1)
- Cyprus (2)
- Czech Republic (1)
- Estonia (1)
- France (3)
- Germany (3)
- Hungary (1)
- Latvia (1)
- Poland (3)
- Russia (3)
- Slovakia (2)
- Sweden (2)
- Ukraine (2)
- United Kingdom (2)
