= Michal Kabelka =

Slovak high jumper

Personal information
- Born: 4 February 1985 (age 41)
- Height: 1.91 m (6 ft 3 in)
- Weight: 74 kg (163 lb)

Sport
- Country: Slovakia
- Sport: Athletics
- Event: High jump
- Updated on 15 August 2012

Michal Kabelka (born 4 February 1985 in Lučenec) is a retired Slovak athlete. He competed at the 2012 Summer Olympics.

Kabelka emerged as a "new name" in high jumping in February 2012, as he improved his three-year-old personal best from 2.24 m to 2.31 m at the Banskobystrická latka meeting. His final mark was only one centimetre off the Slovak national record.

== Competition record ==
Year	Competition	Venue	Position	Notes
Representing Slovakia
2005	European U23 Championships	Erfurt, Germany	21st (q)	2.18 m
2007	European U23 Championships	Debrecen, Hungary	6th	2.21 m
2009	European Indoor Championships	Turin, Italy	11th (q)	2.22 m
2009	Universiade	Belgrade, Serbia	7th	2.15 m
2012	European Championships	Helsinki, Finland	6th	2.24 m
2012	Olympic Games	London, United Kingdom	30th (q)	2.16 m
2013	European Indoor Championships	Gothenburg, Sweden	20th (q)	2.18 m
2015	European Indoor Championships	Prague, Czech Republic	–	NM
