= 2010 European Athletics Championships – Men's high jump =

Men's high jump at the European Athletics Championships

The men's high jump at the 2010 European Athletics Championships was held at the Estadi Olímpic Lluís Companys on 27 and 29 July.

== Medalists ==
| Gold | Aleksandr Shustov; Russia (RUS) |
| Silver | Ivan Ukhov; Russia (RUS) |
| Bronze | (United Kingdom) Martyn Bernard; Great Britain (GBR) |

== Records ==
Standing records prior to the 2010 European Athletics Championships
| World record | Javier Sotomayor (CUB) | 2.45 | Salamanca, Spain | 27 July 1993 |
| European record | Patrik Sjöberg (SWE) | 2.42 | Stockholm, Sweden | 30 June 1987 |
| Championship record | Andrey Silnov (RUS) | 2.36 | Gothenburg, Sweden | 9 August 2006 |
| World Leading | Ivan Ukhov (RUS) | 2.34 | Monaco | 22 July 2010 |
| European Leading | Ivan Ukhov (RUS) | 2.34 | Monaco | 22 July 2010 |

== Schedule ==
| Date | Time | Round |
|---|---|---|
| 27 July 2010 | 19:10 | Qualification |
| 29 July 2010 | 18:30 | Final |

== Results ==
=== Qualification ===
Qualification: Qualification Performance 2.28 (Q) or at least 12 best performers advance to the final

| Rank | Group | Athlete | Nationality | 2.10 | 2.15 | 2.19 | 2.23 | 2.26 | Result | Notes |
|---|---|---|---|---|---|---|---|---|---|---|
| 1 | B | Ivan Ukhov | Russia | – | o | o | o | o | 2.26 | q |
| 2 | A | Aleksandr Shustov | Russia | – | xo | o | o | o | 2.26 | q |
| 3 | A | Marco Fassinotti | Italy | o | o | xxo | o | o | 2.26 | q |
| 4 | A | Aleksey Dmitrik | Russia | o | o | xxo | xo | o | 2.26 | q |
| 5 | A | Jaroslav Bába | Czech Republic | – | o | o | xo | xo | 2.26 | q |
| 6 | B | Konstadínos Baniótis | Greece | – | o | o | xxo | xo | 2.26 | q |
| 7 | A | Martyn Bernard | Great Britain & N.I. | o | o | xo | xxo | xo | 2.26 | q |
| 8 | B | Linus Thörnblad | Sweden | – | o | o | o | xxo | 2.26 | q |
| 9 | A | Oleksandr Nartov | Ukraine | o | o | xxo | o | xxo | 2.26 | q, SB |
| 10 | A | Peter Horák | Slovakia | o | o | o | o | xxx | 2.23 | q |
| 10 | B | Tom Parsons | Great Britain & N.I. | – | o | o | o | xxx | 2.23 | q |
| 12 | A | Sylwester Bednarek | Poland | o | o | o | xo | xxx | 2.23 | q |
| 13 | B | Wojciech Theiner | Poland | o | o | xo | xo | xxx | 2.23 | |
| 14 | A | Filippo Campioli | Italy | – | o | o | xxo | xxx | 2.23 | |
| 15 | B | Viktor Ninov | Bulgaria | xo | o | xo | xxo | xxx | 2.23 | |
| 16 | B | Konrad Owczarek | Poland | o | o | o | xxx | | 2.19 | |
| 17 | B | Andriy Protsenko | Ukraine | o | xo | o | xxx | | 2.19 | |
| 18 | B | Silvano Chesani | Italy | o | o | xo | xxx | | 2.19 | |
| 18 | A | Mihai Donisan | Romania | o | o | xo | xxx | | 2.19 | |
| 18 | B | Normunds Pūpols | Latvia | o | o | xo | xxx | | 2.19 | |
| 21 | B | Dmytro Demyanyuk | Ukraine | – | xo | xo | xxx | | 2.19 | |
| 21 | A | Osku Torro | Finland | – | xo | xo | xxx | | 2.19 | |
| 23 | A | Martijn Nuijens | Netherlands | o | xo | xxo | xxx | | 2.19 | |
| 24 | B | Javier Bermejo | Spain | o | o | xxx | | | 2.15 | |
| 24 | B | Rožle Prezelj | Slovenia | o | o | xxx | | | 2.15 | |
| 26 | A | Janick Klausen | Denmark | o | xo | – | xxx | | 2.15 | |
| 27 | A | Simón Siverio | Spain | xo | xo | xxx | | | 2.15 | |

=== Final ===
| Rank | Athlete | Nationality | 2.19 | 2.23 | 2.26 | 2.29 | 2.31 | 2.33 | 2.35 | Result | Notes |
|---|---|---|---|---|---|---|---|---|---|---|---|
| 1st place, gold medalist(s) | Aleksandr Shustov | Russia | o | o | o | xo | xxo | o | xxx | 2.33 | =WL |
| 2nd place, silver medalist(s) | Ivan Ukhov | Russia | o | xo | o | xxo | xo | x- | xx | 2.31 | |
| 3rd place, bronze medalist(s) | Martyn Bernard | Great Britain & N.I. | - | xxo | x- | o | xxx | | | 2.29 | SB =PB |
| 4 | Linus Thörnblad | Sweden | o | o | o | xo | xxx | | | 2.29 | |
| 5 | Jaroslav Bába | Czech Republic | o | o | xo | xxx | | | | 2.26 | |
| 6 | Oleksandr Nartov | Ukraine | xo | xxo | xo | xxx | | | | 2.26 | =SB |
| 7 | Aleksey Dmitrik | Russia | xo | o | xxo | xxx | | | | 2.26 | |
| 8 | Konstadinos Baniotis | Greece | o | o | xxx | | | | | 2.23 | |
| 9 | Marco Fassinotti | Italy | o | xo | xxx | | | | | 2.23 | |
| 10 | Sylwester Bednarek | Poland | o | xxx | | | | | | 2.19 | |
| 10 | Peter Horák | Slovakia | o | xxx | | | | | | 2.19 | |
| | Tom Parsons | Great Britain & N.I. | xxx | | | | | | | NM | |
