= Athletics at the 2007 Summer Universiade – Men's high jump =

The men's high jump event at the 2007 Summer Universiade was held on 10–11 August.

== Medalists ==
Gold	Silver	Bronze
Aleksandr Shustov; Russia	Kyriakos Ioannou; Cyprus	Oleksandr Nartov; Ukraine

== Results ==
=== Qualification ===
Qualification: 2.23 m (Q) or at least 12 best (q) qualified for the final.

Rank	Group	Athlete	Nationality	1.90	2.00	2.10	2.15	2.20	Result	Notes
1	B	Kyriakos Ioannou	Cyprus						2.20	q
1	B	Viktor Shapoval	Ukraine						2.20	q
1	B	Aleksandr Shustov	Russia						2.20	q
4	A	Konstadinos Baniotis	Greece						2.20	q
5	A	Oleksandr Nartov	Ukraine						2.20	q
6	A	Martyn Bernard	Great Britain						2.20	q
6	A	Tsao Chih-hao	Chinese Taipei						2.20	q
6	A	Liam Zamel-Paez	Australia						2.20	q
9	B	Peter Horák	Slovakia						2.20	q
9	B	Osku Torro	Finland	–	–	o	o	xxo	2.20	q
9	B	Hikaru Tsuchiya	Japan						2.20	q, SB
12	A	Siarhei Haliashou	Belarus						2.15	q
12	B	Andrei Mîtîcov	Moldova						2.15	q
14	B	Dimitrios Chondrokoukis	Greece						2.15	
15	B	Normunds Pūpols	Latvia						2.15	
16	A	Nikita Palli	Israel						2.15	
17	A	Jussi Viita	Finland	–	o	xxo	xxo	xxx	2.15	
18	A	Michael Mason	Canada						2.10	
18	B	Nguyen Duy Bang	Vietnam						2.10	
20	A	Vitaliy Tsykunov	Kazakhstan						2.10	
20	B	Matthias Franta	Germany						2.10	
20	B	Derek Watkins	Canada						2.10	
23	A	Hans von Lieres	Namibia						2.10	
23	A	Jovan Vukićević	Serbia						2.10	
25	A	Toms Andersons	Latvia						2.00	
25	A	Lebopo Malambane	Botswana						2.00	
25	A	Jean-Paul Masanga	Democratic Republic of the Congo						2.00	
25	A	Suchart Singhaklang	Thailand						2.00	
25	B	Ahmad Najwan Aqra Hassaim	Malaysia						2.00	
30	A	Jens Møller Boeriis	Denmark						2.00	
	A	Jah Bennett	Liberia						NM	
	B	Suranji Fernando	Sri Lanka						NM	
	B	Andrew Katwiremu Atuhaire	Uganda						NM	
	B	Zhang Shufeng	China						DNF	
	B	Wilho Eliaser	Namibia						DNF	
	A	Nerijus Bužas	Lithuania						DNS	
	B	Esfandyar Ayati	Iran						DNS	

=== Final ===
Rank	Athlete	Nationality	2.00	2.10	2.15	2.20	2.23	2.26	2.28	2.31	2.35	Result	Notes
1st place, gold medalist(s)	Aleksandr Shustov	Russia	–	–	–	o	o	o	o	xo	xxx	2.31	
2nd place, silver medalist(s)	Kyriakos Ioannou	Cyprus	–	–	o	xo	o	o	xxx			2.26	
3rd place, bronze medalist(s)	Oleksandr Nartov	Ukraine	–	o	o	o	o	xo	xxx			2.26	
4	Viktor Shapoval	Ukraine	–	o	o	xo	o	xxo	xxx			2.26	
5	Martyn Bernard	Great Britain	–	o	xo	o	xxo	xxx				2.23	
6	Peter Horák	Slovakia	–	o	xo	xo	xxx					2.20	
7	Konstadinos Baniotis	Greece	o	o	o	xxx						2.15	
7	Hikaru Tsuchiya	Japan	–	–	o	xxx						2.15	
9	Osku Torro	Finland	–	o	xo	x–	xx					2.15	
9	Tsao Chih-hao	Chinese Taipei	o	o	xo	xxx						2.15	
9	Liam Zamel-Paez	Australia	o	o	xo	xxx						2.15	
12	Andrei Mîtîcov	Moldova	o	o	xxo	xxx						2.15	
13	Siarhei Haliashou	Belarus	o	xxx								2.10	
