= Viktor Ninov =

Bulgarian high jumper

Personal information
- Born: June 19, 1988 (age 38)
- Height: 1.97 m (6 ft 5 1/2 in)
- Weight: 82 kg (181 lb)

Sport
- Country: Bulgaria
- Sport: Athletics
- Event: High jump
- Updated on 15 August 2012

Viktor Ninov (Bulgarian: Виктор Нинов; born 19 June 1988, Cherven Bryag) is a Bulgarian athlete competing in the high jump.

As a junior, he finished thirteenth at the 2009 European U23 Championships.

He later competed at the 2010 European Championships, the 2011 European Indoor Championships, the 2011 World Championships, the 2012 World Indoor Championships, the 2012 European Championships, the 2012 Olympic Games and the 2013 European Indoor Championships without ever reaching the final.

His personal best jump is 2.29 metres, achieved in July 2011 in Plovdiv. Indoors he has recorded 2.30 metres in February 2013 in Prague.

== Competition record ==
Year	Competition	Venue	Position	Notes
Representing Bulgaria
2009	European U23 Championships	Kaunas, Lithuania	13th	2.10 m
2010	European Championships	Barcelona, Spain	15th (q)	2.23 m
2011	European Indoor Championships	Paris, France	13th (q)	2.22 m
2011	World Championships	Daegu, South Korea	18th (q)	2.28 m
2012	World Indoor Championships	Istanbul, Turkey	11th (q)	2.26 m
2012	European Championships	Helsinki, Finland	21st (q)	2.15 m
2012	Olympic Games	London, United Kingdom	28th (q)	2.16 m
2013	European Indoor Championships	Gothenburg, Sweden	13th (q)	2.23 m
2014	European Championships	Zürich, Switzerland	22nd (q)	2.15 m
