= Dmytro Dem'yanyuk =

Ukrainian high jumper

Personal information
- Born: June 30, 1983 (age 43)
- Height: 2.00 m (6 ft 6 1/2 in)
- Weight: 86 kg (190 lb)

Sport
- Country: Ukraine
- Sport: Athletics
- Event: High jump
- Updated on 15 August 2012

Dmytro Dem'yanyuk (born 30 June 1983) is a male high jumper from Ukraine.

He competed at the 2007 World Championships, the 2008 World Indoor Championships, the 2008 Olympic Games and the 2012 Summer Olympics without reaching the final. At the 2010 World Indoor Championships he failed to record a valid jump. At the 2011 World Championships, he finished in 12th place.

He won high jump at European Team Championship 2011 in Stockholm with new personal best of 2.35 metres.

His father, Oleksiy Demyanyuk, was also a high jumper.

== Competition record ==
Year	Competition	Venue	Position	Notes
Representing Ukraine
2007	World Championships	Osaka, Japan	25th (q)	2.23 m
2008	World Indoor Championships	Valencia, Spain	10th (q)	2.24 m
2008	Olympic Games	Beijing, China	21st (q)	2.20 m
2010	World Indoor Championships	Doha, Qatar	–	NM
2010	European Championships	Barcelona, Spain	21st (q)	2.19 m
2011	European Indoor Championships	Paris, France	17th (q)	2.22 m
2011	European Team Championships	Stockholm, Sweden	1st	2.35 m
2011	World Championships	Daegu, South Korea	12th	2.20 m
2012	European Championships	Helsinki, Finland	20th (q)	2.19 m
2012	Olympic Games	London, England	16th (q)	2.21 m
2013	European Indoor Championships	Gothenburg, Sweden	8th	2.21 m
2018	European Championships	Berlin, Germany	3rd (q)	2.25 m^{1}
2019	European Indoor Championships	Glasgow, United Kingdom	–	NM

^{1}No mark in the final
