= Moravia High Jump Tour =

Indoor athletics competition in Czechia

The Moravia High Jump Tour is an elite-level, invitation-only, indoor athletics competition for the world's best high jumpers, both men and women. It is a high jump-only competition held in the eastern Czech region of Moravia. Although the competition is held in small basketball gymnasiums, without a track, the tour is sanctioned by the IAAF, the sport's governing body.

== Description and history ==
First organized as a tour in 2005, it quickly became the world's best (non-championship) indoor competition and routinely produces world-leading jumps. Held in the Czech Republic in late January each year, the tour initially consisted of three stops spread over a week, including the city of Ostrava, but in 2008, it was shortened to two competitions, held three days apart in Hustopeče and Třinec. The two events are now usually held on a Wednesday and Saturday, or, on Saturday and Tuesday. The first tour was officially only for men, but a women's competition was held in 2005. The women's program was formally launched at the 2006 tour, in all three towns.

The Třinec event is also known as The Beskyd's Bar and is held at the Vitality Slezsko Indoor Tennis Arena. Competitors are allowed to practice on the converted tennis court the evening before the competition. The city of Hustopece is located near Brno.

Jumpers are encouraged to "play to the crowd" and the indoor party atmosphere is further enhanced by having music played as they prepare to jump. The narrow basketball gymnasium at Hustopece can only accommodate 1,000 spectators, while about 2,000 can squeeze into the facility at Třinec. Rubberized floor panels are laid down over the wooden basketball court so that the jumpers can wear their jumping shoes with short spikes.

Although jumpers are invited to compete in all stops on the tour, often their schedules permit them to jump at only one venue. Also, severe winter weather occasionally prevents athletes from flying into the Czech Republic, and can even hamper travel between tour cities. In addition to the individual event winners, an overall men's and women's champion is crowned based on the combined heights of their best jumps in the two (initially three) cities.

First organized as a tour in January 2005, over its first four years, the series witnessed 14 men's marks of 2.30 m or better (7 feet 6 1/2 inches), and on the women's side, twenty (20) marks of 1.92 m or higher (6 ft 3 1/2in). For unknown reasons, the gymnasium at Hustopeče has consistently yielded higher results than the facility at Třinec, for both men and women. After the 4th tour in 2008, the meet records at Třinec were 2.32 (Jaroslav Bába, 2004) and 1.97 (Barbora Laláková, 2008), while at Hustopeče they were 2.36 (Ivan Ukhov, 2008) and 1.99 (Vita Palamar and Ariane Friedrich, 2008).

Russian jumper Ivan Ukhov won the men's competition at the tour in 2009, 2010, and 2011, each time breaking the meet record with a world-leading jump: 2.36 at Hustopeče in 2009; 2.37 at Hustopeče in 2010; and 2.38 (7 ft 9 1/2 in) at Hustopeče in 2011. At the 2011 event in Hustopeče, Ukhov attempted three times to leap 2.44 (8 feet), one centimeter higher than the world indoor record set by Javier Sotomayor in 1989. The 44-year-old Cuban was in attendance to watch the 24-year-old Russian narrowly miss on his second jump, brushing the bar on his way down.

== 1st Moravia High Jump Tour 2005 ==
The inaugural tour event included three stops: the first leg at Hustopeče, second at Třinec, and the third stop in Ostrava on 29 January. Czech jumper Jaroslav Bába was the overall winner on the men's side, competing in all three venues with marks of 2.35 (first), 2.27, and 2.25 (third), totalling 687 cm. Svatoslav Ton was second overall (676 cm) and American Tora Harris was third (670 cm). A total of 19 male jumpers competed for the three-meet tour in 2005.

- A total of 16 Women competed in 2005, although it was not recognized as an IAAF-sanctioned event for women that year.

Hustopeče: The men's winner was local Czech hero Jaroslav Bába, who established a world-leading jump of 2.35 m.

Třinec:

Ostrava: Theen's winner was Czech Svatoslav Ton with a third-attempt clearance of 2.29 metres (7 ft 6.16 in). Ukrainian Yuriy Krymarenko was second at 2.27, and Ostrava's Jaroslav Bába was third at 2.25 (passing 2.27 and missing all three attempts at 2.29).

== 2nd Moravia High Jump Tour 2006 ==
The second season saw the addition of a women's competition. The overall men's winner was again Czech favorite Svatoslav Ton. A total of 22 men and 15 women - representing 13 countries - competed on the three-stop tour.

Třinec: The first venue was at Třinec on Monday, 16 January. Russian Ivan Ukhov and Czech Tomas Janku both cleared 2.28, but Ukhov was the winner based on fewer misses. Svatoslav Ton was third at 2.24. On the women's side, Czech jumpers Barbora Laláková and Iva Straková both cleared 1.92, with Laláková the victor. Irina Glavatskikh (Russia) was third at 1.89.

Ostrava: The second tour stop was Ostrava, on Wednesday, 18 January. Ivan Ukhov was again the men's winner, with the same result of 2.28.

Hustopeče: The third tour stop was Hustopeče, on 21 January. Svatoslav Ton won on the men's side with a jump of 2.33, while Ivan Ukhov was second at 2.31. Iva Straková won the women's event with a leap of 1.93, and Irina Glavatskikh was second at 1.90.

== 3rd Moravia High Jump Tour 2007 ==
The 3rd tour in 2007 consisted of three stops. First in Hustopeče on 20 January, second in Ostrava on 23 January, and the third stop in Třinec on 25 January. Thomas Janku won the overall men's competition (combined 680 cm), while Marina Aitova won the women's title with a combined height of 574 cm.

Hustopece: (20 January) Russian Andrei Tereshin won the M men's event at 2.33.

Ostrava: (23 January)

Třinec: (25 January)

== 4th Moravia High Jump Tour 2008 ==
The 4th version of the tour was shortened to two stops, with the elimination of Ostrava. The first leg of the 2008 tour was held at Hustopeče on 19 January, with the second stop in Třinec on Monday, 21 January.

Hustopeče: (19 January) Russian Ivan Ukhov cleared a world-leading 2.36 m to highlight the opening leg of the 4th Moravian High Jump Tour. With his third-attempt clearance, the 21-year-old Russian indoor record holder added a centimetre to his own 2008 best and bettered Jaroslav Bába's record of 2.35 (set in 2005). Sweden's Linus Thörnblad was second at 2.34, and Russian Aleksei Dmitrik was third at 2.30.

Třinec: (Monday, 21 January) Linus Thornblad won at 2.30, while Russians Ivan Ukhov and Andrey Tereshin both cleared 2.26, with Ukhov taking second based on fewer misses. In the women's competition, Czech jumpers Barora Laláková (1.97) and Romana Dubnová (1.90) finished first and second, with Russian Viktoriya Klyugina also in a tie for second at 1.90.

== 5th Moravia High Jump Tour 2009 ==
The 5th annual Moravia High Jump Tour was held at Třinec on Wednesday, 21 January 2011, and at Hustopeče on 24 January.

Třinec: Ivan Ukhov won the men's event with a jump of 2.33. Teammate Andrei Tereshin finished second at 2.30.

Hustopeče: Russian Ivan Ukhov bettered his season-best by 1 centimeter, clearing 2.34 metres (7 ft 8.13 in) to win at Hustopeče. Aleksandr Shuskov finished second at 2.27.

== 6th Moravia High Jump Tour 2010 ==
Hustopeče: The Senior Men's competition during the first leg at Hustopeče on 23 January 2010, had 12 competitors and was won by Russian Ivan Ukhov, who defended his 2009 title and broke his meet record with a jump of 2.37 metres (7 ft 9.31 in). Ukhov began the competition with a "warm-up" jump of 2.20, continued at 2.28, 2.30, and 2.32, with first-attempt clearances. He then cleared 2.37 and made three attempts at 2.41, coming extremely close on his first. American Dusty Jonas finished second, with a third-attempt clearance of 2.30 (7 ft 6 1/2 in).

Třinec: On 26 January at Třinec, the results were repeated, as Ukhov won again, with a jump of 7 ft 8 inches, and Dusty Jonas was runner-up with a third-attempt clearance of 7 ft 7 1/4 inches.

== 7th Moravia High Jump Tour 2011 ==
The 2011 competitions were held on 26 January in Třinec, and on 29 January in Hustopeče.

At the first meeting in Třinec, the Junior Women's competition was won by Russian Mariya Kuchina, who established a new indoor junior record of 1.97 metres (6 ft 5.56 in), breaking the record of 1.96 established by Bulgaria's Desislava Aleksandrova at the 1994 European Athletics Indoor Championships in Paris. Kuchina, who turned 18 just two weeks earlier, entered the competition with personal bests of 1.90 indoors and 1.91 outdoors. She shattered those with a second-attempt clearance of 1.92 to win the event, then flew over 1.94 on her first attempt, and cleared 1.97 on her second jump.

Třinec: The men's competition was won by Russian Aleksandr Shustov, with a jump of "only" 2.29m: he had three close misses at 2.31. (Ukhov did not compete in Třinec.)

Hustopeče: Russian Ivan Ukhov won in Hustopeče for the third year in a row, and again broke his meet record with a world-leading jump of 2.38. After passing at 2.41, he had the bar raised to world indoor - and Europe - a record of 2.44 (8 feet). His first two attempts were extremely close, brushing the bar off on his way down on the second attempt. The victory and record attempts were all the more special because it was witnessed by world record-holder Javier Sotomayor (that year's special guest).

== 8th Moravia High Jump Tour 2012 ==
The 2012 competitions were held on 28 January in Hustopeče, and on 30 January in Třinec.

At the first meeting in Hustopeče, five men jumped 2.31 (7'-7"), but only Aleksey Dmitrik (Russia) cleared 2.35 (7'-8.5") for the win and the early lead for the highest jump in 2012, to date. For Dmitrik, he was perfect through 2.31, then required two tries to clear 2.33 (while the rest of the field passed), then established a new personal best indoors with his third try clearance at 2.35. He then had the bar raised to a Russian record of 2.41, coming very close on his final try, as third-place finisher and Russian record-holder (2.40) Ivan Ukhov watched; video replay shows Dmitrik getting his hips cleanly over the bar, but his heels barely clipped the bar on the way down. Russia's Andrey Silnov finished second. Possibly the biggest surprise was the 2.31 by Britain's Samson Oni, tying his personal best indoors and good enough to tie for 3rd with Ukhov. Of note, the top American men jumpers did not compete in the 2012 tour, remaining in the U.S. to participate in the (first) U.S. Open invitational track meet at New York's Madison Square Garden on 28 January 2012.

In the women's event, Russian Svetlana Shkolina was the only female to clear 1.95 (6'-4.75"), while three others cleared 1.93 (6'-4"), including Chanute Howard Lowe of the United States. Mariya Kuchina, also of Russia and who set a world junior indoor record of 1.97 on the Moravian Tour in 2011, was fourth, also at 1.93.

The second competition was held on Monday, 30 January in Třinec. With only one day off (not the customary two days), the men's winning height was lower than at Hustopeče. Russian Ivan Ukhov out-jumped the field and was flawless through the winning height of 2.32, then missed all 3 attempts at a (world-leading) 2.36. Trevor Barry (Bahamas) was second at 2.29, veteran Jaroslav Bába (Czech Republic) was third at 2.25, while Aleksey Dmitrik (Russia) the winner of the first leg at Hustopeče, was fourth at Třinec with a jump of only 2.25.

The women's competition at Třinec improved over Hustopeče: 1st for Mariya Kuchina (Russia) with her first try clearance of 1.96; 2nd to Svetlana Shkolina (Russia) also at 1.96, but on her 3rd attempt; 3rd to Esthera Petre (Romania) at 1.93; 4th for Irina Gordeyeva (Russia) at 1.90; and 5th place for Chaunté Lowe (USA) at 1.90 meters. The 19-year-old Kuchina, the 2011 European Athletics Junior Championships gold medalist, cleared a season's best of 1.96 with her first attempt and then tried to break her own World Indoor Junior record with three close attempts at 1.98m. Kuchina set the junior indoor record in 2011 at 1.97 meters.

== 9th Moravia High Jump Tour 2013 ==
The first leg of the 9th Moravia High Jump Tour was held in Hustopeče on 26 January. Ivan Ukhov won the men's section with a clearance of 2.30 m, defeating Mutaz Essa Barshim on count-back. Alessia Trost won the women's high jump with 1.95 m. Trost improved to 2.00 m to win the second leg, held in Třinec on 29 January – a jump which ranked her as the second-best Italian indoor jumper. Ukhov surprisingly failed at 2.20 m in Třinec and Barshim set a world-leading 2.34 m to win the series. Men's runner-up Aleksey Dmitrik had the second-best performance of the tour, clearing 2.31 m for second place.

== See also ==
- Europa SC High Jump indoor competition held in Banská Bystrica, Slovak Republic, in early February
