= Diego Ferrín =

Ecuadorian high jumper (born 1988)

Personal information
- Full name: Diego Javier Ferrín Valencia
- Born: March 21, 1988 (age 38) Quinindé, Esmeraldas, Ecuador
- Height: 1.90 m (6 ft 3 in)
- Weight: 72 kg (159 lb)

Sport
- Country: Ecuador
- Sport: Athletics
- Event: High jump
Medal record
Representing Ecuador
Pan American Games
| Silver medal – second place | 2011 Guadalajara | High jump |
South American Games
| Gold medal – first place | 2010 Medellin | High jump |

Diego Javier Ferrín Valencia (born 21 March 1988 in Quinindé, Esmeraldas) is an Ecuadorian athlete competing in the high jump. He competed at the 2012 Summer Olympics.

== Personal bests ==
Outdoor

- 110 m hurdles: 14.26 s A (wind: +0.8 m/s) – (Ecuador) Quito, 28 May 2011
- High jump: 2.30 m A – (Mexico) Guadalajara, 27 October 2011
- Long jump: 7.44 m (wind: +0.1 m/s) – (Brazil) São Paulo, 6 July 2007

Indoor

- High jump: 2.25 m – (France) Eaubonne, 11 February 2011

== Competition record ==
| Year | Competition | Venue | Position | Event | Notes |
Representing Ecuador
| 2006 | South American Youth Championships | Caracas, Venezuela | 4th | High jump | 1.99 m |
| 2006 | South American Youth Championships | Caracas, Venezuela | 2nd | Octathlon | 5750 pts |
| 2007 | South American Championships | São Paulo, Brazil | 4th | High jump | 2.10 m |
| 2007 | South American Championships | São Paulo, Brazil | 7th | 4 × 400 m relay | 3:16.91 min |
| 2007 | South American Junior Championships | São Paulo, Brazil | 1st | High jump | 2.12 m |
| 2007 | South American Junior Championships | São Paulo, Brazil | 3rd | Long jump | 7.43 m (wind: +0.8 m/s) |
| 2007 | South American Junior Championships | São Paulo, Brazil | 5th | 4 × 400 m relay | 3:26.27 min |
| 2007 | Pan American Junior Championships | São Paulo, Brazil | 3rd | Long jump | 7.44 m (wind: +0.1 m/s) |
| 2008 | South American U23 Championships | Lima, Peru | 3rd | High jump | 2.11 m |
| 2008 | South American U23 Championships | Lima, Peru | 8th | Long jump | 6.83 m (wind: +0.0 m/s) |
| 2008 | South American U23 Championships | Lima, Peru | 4th | 4 × 100 m relay | 43.74 |
| 2009 | South American Championships | Lima, Peru | 3rd | High jump | 2.10 m |
| 2009 | Bolivarian Games | Sucre, Bolivia | 3rd | High jump | 2.05 m A |
| 2010 | South American U23 Championships | Medellín, Colombia | 1st | High jump | 2.18 m |
| 2010 | Ibero-American Championships | San Fernando, Spain | 8th | High jump | 2.12 m |
| 2011 | South American Championships | Buenos Aires, Argentina | 1st | High jump | 2.23 m |
| 2011 | ALBA Games | Barquisimeto, Venezuela | 2nd | High jump | 2.14 m |
| 2011 | World Championships | Daegu, South Korea | 23rd (q) | High jump | 2.21 m |
| 2011 | Pan American Games | Guadalajara, Mexico | 2nd | High jump | 2.30 m |
| 2012 | World Indoor Championships | Istanbul, Turkey | 21st (q) | High jump | 2.22 m |
| 2012 | Ibero-American Championships | Barquisimeto, Venezuela | 3rd | High jump | 2.25 m |
| 2012 | Olympic Games | London, United Kingdom | 21st (q) | High jump | 2.21 m |
| 2013 | South American Championships | Cartagena, Colombia | 6th | High jump | 2.16 m |
| 2013 | World Championships | Moscow, Russia | 25th (q) | High jump | 2.17 m |
| 2015 | South American Championships | Lima, Peru | – | High jump | NM |
