= Dimitrios Chondrokoukis =

Greek-Cypriot high jumper (born 1988)

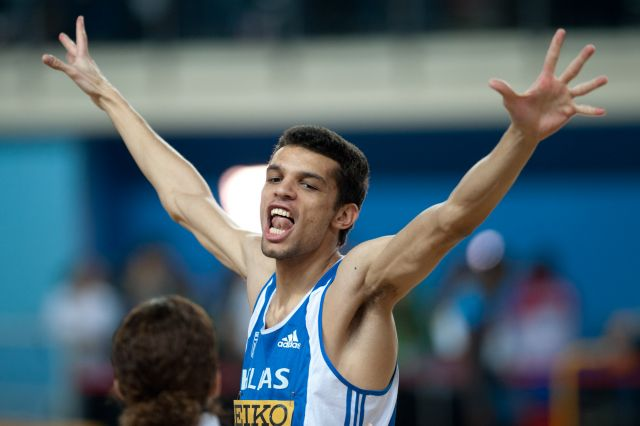

Personal information
- Born: January 26, 1988 (age 38) Marousi, Greece
Medal record
Representing Greece
IAAF World Indoor Championships
| Gold medal – first place | Istanbul 2012 | High jump |

Dimítrios Chondrokoúkis (Greek: Δημήτρης Χονδροκούκης, born January 26, 1988) is a Greek-Cypriot high jumper who competes internationally for Cyprus, since 2013. He won the gold medal at the 2012 Word Indoor Championships in Istanbul with a personal best of 2.33 meters representing Greece at the time. His personal best in the outdoor track is 2.32 m, achieved twice in İzmir in June 2011 and in the final at the 2011 World Championships in Athletics in Daegu, South Korea on 1 September 2011.

In July 2012, it was announced Chondrokoúkis tested positive for the performance-enhancing drug stanozolol, an anabolic steroid. As a result, he was forced to withdraw from the 2012 Summer Olympics.

Chondrokoúkis was born in Marousi. In June 2013, KOEAS (Cyprus Amateur Athletic Federation) announced that he would represent Cyprus, since his mother was from Karavas, Kyrenia.

== Personal bests ==
| Date | Event | Venue | Performance |
|---|---|---|---|
| 20 June 2011 | High jump (outdoor) | İzmir, Turkey | 2.32 m |
| 11 March 2012 | High jump (indoor) | Istanbul, Turkey | 2.33 m |

== Honours ==
| Year | Competition | Venue | Position | Notes |
Representing Greece
| 2006 | World Junior Championships | Beijing, China | 6th | 2.19 m |
| 2007 | European Junior Championships | Hengelo, Netherlands | 4th | 2.21 m |
| 2007 | Universiade | Bangkok, Thailand | 14th (q) | 2.15 m |
| 2009 | European U23 Championships | Kaunas, Lithuania | 12th | 2.14 m |
| 2011 | European Indoor Championships | Paris, France | 5th | 2.29 m (PB) |
| 2011 | European Team Championships | İzmir, Turkey | 1st | 2.32 m (PB) |
| 2011 | World Championships | Daegu, South Korea | 5th | 2.32 m |
| 2012 | World Indoor Championships | Istanbul, Turkey | 1st | 2.33 m (PB) |
Representing Cyprus
| 2015 | European Indoor Championships | Prague, Czech Republic | 19th (q) | 2.19 m |
| 2015 | World Championships | Beijing, China | 11th | 2.25 m |
| 2016 | European Championships | Amsterdam, Netherlands | 7th | 2.24 m |
| 2016 | Olympic Games | Rio de Janeiro, Brazil | 12th | 2.25 m |
