= Ivan Ukhov =

Russian high jumper

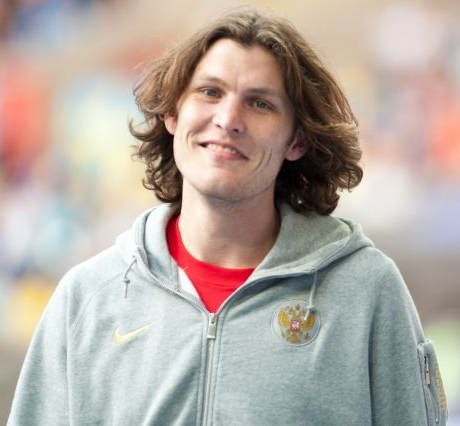
- Ukhov during the 2013 World Championships in Athletics

Personal information
- Full name: Ivan Sergeyevich Ukhov
- Nationality: Russia
- Born: 29 March 1986 (age 40) Chelyabinsk, Russian SFSR, Soviet Union
- Height: 1.92 m (6 ft 3 1/2 in)
- Weight: 83 kg (183 lb)

Sport
- Country: Russia
- Sport: Men's athletics
- Event: High jump
- Coached by: Sergey Klyugin

Achievements and titles
- Personal bests: Outdoor: 2.39 m (7 ft 10 in); Indoor: 2.40 m (7 ft 10 1/4 in)
Medal record
Olympic Games
Disqualified	2012 London	High jump
World Indoor Championships
Gold medal – first place	2010 Doha	High jump
Disqualified	2014 Sopot	High jump
Bronze medal – third place	2012 Istanbul	High jump
European Championships
Silver medal – second place	2010 Barcelona	High jump
Disqualified	2014 Zürich	High jump
European Indoor Championships
Gold medal – first place	2009 Turin	High jump
Gold medal – first place	2011 Paris	High jump
European Junior Championships
Gold medal – first place	2005 Kaunas	High jump
Representing Europe
Continental Cup
Disqualified	2014 Marrakech	High jump

Ivan Sergeyevich Ukhov (Russian: Иван Сергеевич Ухов; born 29 March 1986) is a Russian high jumper. He won a gold medal at the 2010 IAAF World Indoor Championships and is a two-time European Indoor champion (2009 and 2011). He was also the silver medallist at the 2010 European Athletics Championships and the winner of the high jump at the inaugural 2010 IAAF Diamond League. In the 2012 Summer Olympics in London, he won the gold medal, but it was later stripped for a doping violation.

Ukhov has broken the Russian national record indoors four times: jumping 2.39 m (7 ft 10 in) on 28 January 2007 in Moscow; besting that with a 2.40 m (7 ft 10 1/4 in) jump on 25 February 2009 in Athens. His best outdoor effort, 2.39 m (7 ft 10 in), was set in Cheboksary on 5 July 2012. His leap of 2.40 m (7 ft 10 1/4 in) in 2009 made him the 11th man in history to jump 2.40 or better, and only four of those men have jumped higher (indoors and out); only three men have jumped higher indoors (Patrik Sjöberg, 2.41 in 1987; Carlo Thränhardt, 2.42 in 1988, and Javier Sotomayor, 2.43 in 1993).

== Career ==
=== Early career ===
Ukhov gave an interview for an IAAF news report in May 2013, while "training" with a Moscow-area basketball team. In between dunks, he said, "I played basketball for about 10 years, between the ages of seven and 16 for my school team. I became the best player in my town and region." Previously, in a July 2010 interview for BBC News, Ukhov – whom friends call Vanya – said his love of sports began at age 7 when his mother enrolled him in basketball: "After nine years of playing it I quarrelled with my coach and decided to take up a different, individual sport. I was quite big and chose discus, then at the age of 17 I tried the high jump. After training for about a year I set the Russian junior record and decided that it would be easier to carry on jumping than discus", he said. In a May 2014 interview Ukhov further elaborated that, in his first year of throwing the discus he did well enough to compete at the Russian Junior Championships in 2004. At that meet he (somehow) entered the High Jump and with no coaching he won by clearing 2.12 m (6 ft 11 1/4 in). Ukhov immediately dropped the discus and began to learn proper high jump mechanics, he established a personal best of 2.15 m (7 ft 1/2 in) on 28 June 2004. One year later he improved to 2.30 m (7 ft 6 1/2 in) (on 4 July 2005) at a meet in Tula, Russia, and he won the European Junior Championship in 2005 with a leap of 2.23 m (7 ft 3 3/4 in) He represented Russia at the 2004 IAAF World Junior Championships in Grosseto, Italy, but failed to qualify amongst the top 12 jumpers on 13 July, and did not make the finals.

He won the gold medal at the 2005 European Athletics Junior Championships (age 19 and under), held in Kaunas. He was the only competitor to clear 2.23, and said afterwards "I feel a bit confused. I still can not believe that I am a winner."

=== 2006 ===
Ukhov's performances in 2006 confirmed that he was better indoors than outside. On Monday 16 January 2006, jumping in the first leg of the Moravia High Jump Tour in Trinec, he won the competition with a first attempt clearance of 2.28, and was the only competitor who was really close at 2.30. He achieved a personal best outdoor jump of 2.33 m (7 ft 7 1/2 in), in Langen, Germany (on 25 June 2006), and was named to the Russian team for the 19th European Athletics Championships held in Goteborg, Sweden in early August. He qualified for the 12-man Finals with a jump of 2.23, but two days later, 9 August 2006, he could manage no better than 2.20 for equal last place.

=== 2007 ===
The 20-year-old Ukhov won all three of the meets he entered in January 2007, with heights of 2.30 or better. At the annual Russian Winter Cup meet in Moscow, held on 28 January 2007 at the Vladimir Kutz Arena, the 20-year-old Ukhov elevated his personal best by 6 cm, jumping 2.39 m (7 ft 10 in) to set a new Russian national record in the High Jump. Ukhov broke the record of 2.38, set in Sweden by Yaroslav Rybakov in February 2005. Ukhov was pushed to the record in a tactical duel with (reigning World Indoor champion) Rybakov. After each cleared 2.31, Rybakov took the lead with a first try clearance at 2.35. Ukhov failed in his first attempt and, with second-place already assured, he elected to pass. With the bar raised to 2.37, Ukhov flew over the bar on his first attempt, while Rybakov failed and decided to use his two remaining jumps at 2.39, one centimetre higher than his record of 2.38. Rybakov did not succeed, but Ukhov once again thrilled the Moscow crowd with a first-try clearance, and then failed at 2.41. The 2.39 effort ranked him tied for sixth place among the top indoor high jumpers of all time. One week later, at the Arnstadt, Germany meet on 3 February 2007, Rybakov would win, tying his personal best of 2.38, while Ukhov finished fourth at 2.31.

=== 2008–2009 ===
In September 2008, Ukhov was not invited to the Grand Prix IAAF meetings, because of his intoxicated actions during the Athletissima competition in Lausanne held on 2 September. There, he was found to have drunk Vodka and Red Bull prior to the competition, and was unable to make a valid jump. The IAAF issued a strong warning to Ukhov in respect of his conduct: the IAAF did not suspend him, but he did not compete afterwards.

Pavel Voronkov, his manager, later said: "There's no denying that Ivan was drunk but he had a fight with his girlfriend and was also upset at failing to qualify for the Olympics. Obviously, Ivan regrets it very much and we have already reimbursed the organisers for all their expenses. He is still young and it should be a good lesson for him but a year ban would just completely destroy him as an athlete."

He returned to competition at the annual Moravia High Jump Tour in late January 2009. Ukhov won both Tour events and outjumped all of his competitors, first jumping 2.33 on 21 January at Trinec, then bettered that with a 2.34 clearance at Hustopece on 24 January. At the Athens indoor meeting on 25 February 2009, Ukhov cleared 2.40, setting a new national record and the world's best season mark. The 2.40 m (7 ft 10 1/4 in) mark also made him the equal-fifth highest jumper in the history of the sport. He also improved his outdoor best on 25 July 2009 at the Russian National Championships in Cheboksary when he cleared 2.35 to win the event beating Yaroslav Rybakov, who cleared the same height. At the 2009 IAAF World Championships in Berlin Ukhov jumped 2.30 in qualifying, but when a torrential downpour wreaked havoc with the High Jump Final, Ukhov could manage only 2.23 and finished in 10th place: Rybakov won gold with a first-attempt clearance at 2.32. Ukhov won five summer meets with jumps of 2.34 and 2.35, and defeated Rybakov three times before losing in the rain in Berlin.

=== 2010 ===
Ukhov began his 2010 indoor season at the 6th Moravia High Jump Tour, winning both competitions: first at the meeting in Hustopece, Czech Republic on 23 January, he set a meet record of 2.37 m (7 ft 9 1/4 in) (which would be the best jump in the world indoors or out in 2010); then he won the second leg on 27 January in Triniste with a leap of 2.34.

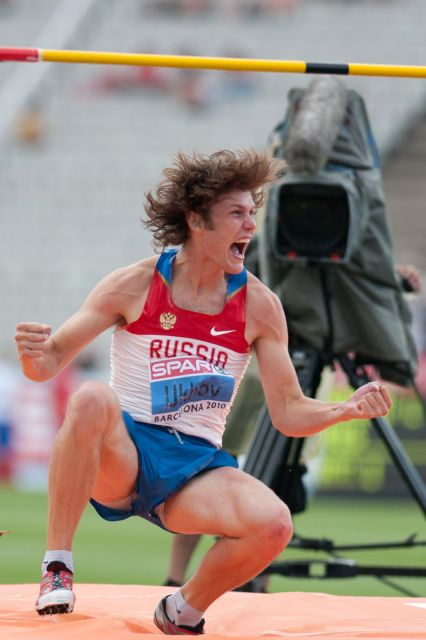
Ukhov celebrating silver at the 2010 European Championships

At the 2010 IAAF World Indoor Championships in March he claimed his first world title with a jump of 2.36 m, beating national rival Yaroslav Rybakov in the process. One of the finest high jump competitions of the year was at Lausanne, Switzerland on 8 July 2010, when 11 men were still in competition at 2.30. Only four cleared it, with Ukhov going to defeat Rybakov – on misses – at 2.33, with a superb first attempt clearance at 2.33. Ukhov won again at Monaco, on 22 July, with a world-leading 2.34. At Monaco, four jumpers attempted 2.31, but only Ukhov made it (on his first attempt), and then 2.34 on his first effort, before failing three times at 2.36.

One week later he competed at the 2010 European Athletics Championships, in Barcelona, Spain. The Men's Final was held 29 July, and this time he ended up behind a fellow Russian, as Aleksandr Shustov took gold at 2.33 and Ukhov was the silver medallist – his first European outdoor medal – with a jump of 2.31.

At London, on 14 August 2010, in conditions described as "wet and chilly", Ukhov won again, out-jumping his competitors with a second-effort clearance at 2.29, as second- and third-place tied at 2.27. Ukhov again outjumped the field at the Weltklasse meet in Zurich on 19 August, with another first-try clearance at 2.29, then trying 2.35 without success. The win in Zurich ensured that he finished the top of the rankings in the High Jump series at the inaugural 2010 IAAF Diamond League.

Ukhov entered a total of 20 competitions in 2010 – indoors and out – and won 14 of them. He jumped an outdoor best of 2.36 at the 5th annual Opole jumping festival in Opole, Poland on 11 September, a mark which was the best by any athlete in 2010. Ukhov's jump was all the more remarkable given that second place was 2.26, while he went on to clear 2.30 and 2.33 on his first jumps, then made 2.36 on his third, followed by three misses at 2.41.

=== 2011 ===
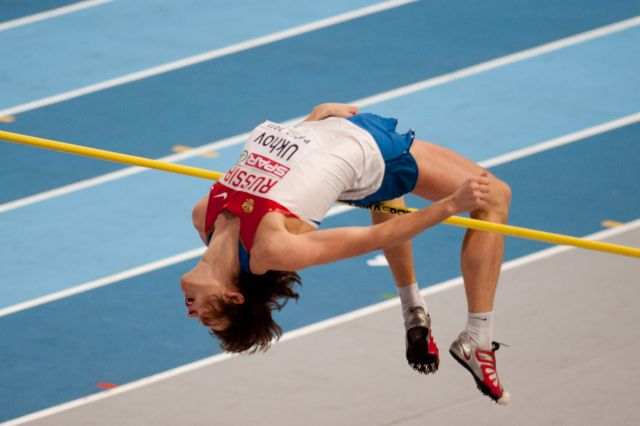
Ukhov at the 2011 European Indoor Championships.

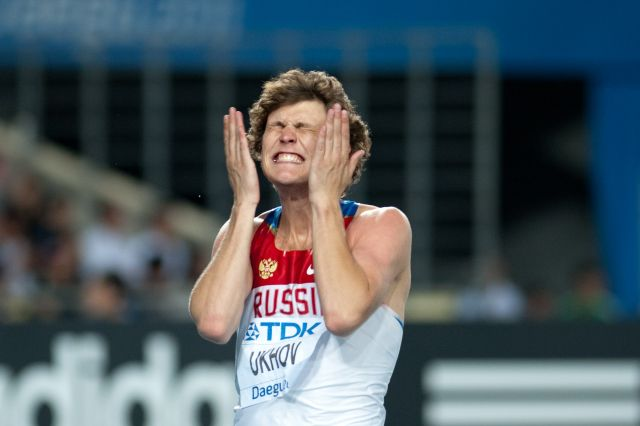
Ukhov at the 2011 World Championships

The Moravia High Jump Tour on 29 January saw him start the 2011 indoor season in strong form, opening – as he usually does – at 2.20 and progressing to eventually clear 2.38 m (7 ft 9 1/2 in) on his second try, and then came close in an attempt to break Javier Sotomayor's world indoor mark of 2.43. With Sotomayor standing behind him watching, Ukhov first two attempts at 2.44 m (8 feet) were excellent, accelerating through his 11-step approach and getting his hips over cleanly before the back of his thighs brushed the bar on the way down, barely bouncing the bar off. On 3 February, he won the Moscow High Jump with Music Cup for the fourth time in his career, with a jump of 2.30, outjumping four other Russian competitors who could manage no higher than 2.27. He repeated his 2.38 performance on 9 February at the Europa SC High Jump meeting in Banská Bystrica, Slovakia. He cleared every height on his first attempt through 2.38, then again had the bar set at 2.44 m (8 feet). Ukhov's attempts at the would-be world (indoor) record height were said to be even closer than his previous efforts two weeks earlier in Hustopece. Uhkov skipped the 2011 Russian Indoor Championships (held in Moscow on 16–18 February), in order to compete in the special Hochsprung mit Musik competition in Arnstadt, Germany, on 19 February, which he won with a jump of 2.34 (three cm better than second-place).

At the European Indoor Championships in Paris, Ukhov held off Czech Jaroslav Bába to win the gold medal on Saturday 5 March 2011, equalling his season-best, and world-leading, jump of 2.38 m (7 ft 9 1/2 in). The 24-year-old was tied with Baba at 2.34 after each cleared on their first attempt, while fellow Russian Aleksandr Shustov secured the bronze medal with his third attempt clearance at 2.34. Ukhov then cleared 2.36 on his first jump and Baba, after missing, passed to 2.38. Once again Ukhov delivered a first jump clearance, while Baba missed and decided to make his third attempt at 2.40. Baba missed and Ukhov, having secured the victory with eight jumps, passed at 2.40 (the meet record) and instead had the bar raised to a new European – and world indoor – record 2.44 m (8 feet). But he failed on all three attempts.

Uhkov opened his international outdoor competition in the Czech Republic at the 50th Golden Spike Ostrava meet on 31 May, which he won (on a tie-breaker) with a height of 2.32 m (7 ft 7 1/4 in). He was tied with German Raul Spank after each opened at 2.15 and then jumped "clean" with no misses through 2.32, breaking the meet record of 2.31. After both missed all three tries at 2.36 the tie-breaker was implemented: each was given a fourth attempt at 2.36, then the bar was lowered to 2.34 and then returned to 2.32, which only Ukhov was able to clear a second time for the win.

The fourth Diamond League competition of the year, the Prefontaine Classic in Eugene, Oregon on Saturday 4 June brought together an elite 8-man field of the world's best jumpers. Ukhov was only able to clear only 2.29 for sixth place – his first loss of the year – while three men cleared 2.32: (current world-leader) Jesse Williams (USA), (reigning Olympic champion) Andrey Silnov (Russia), and the winner Raúl Spank (Germany). He qualified for the final at the 2011 World Championships in Athletics, but having taken three attempts to clear 2.32 and a failure at 2.35 he finished fifth on count-back.

=== 2012 season ===
At the beginning of the year he cleared 2.32 to win the Trinec Moravia High Jump Tour meet. He was runner-up at the Hochsprung mit Musik behind compatriot Aleksey Dmitrik, but defeated world champion Jesse Williams at the Europa SC High Jump with a mark of 2.33. Ukhov won the 2012 Russian Indoor Championships, held in Moscow on 23 February: both Ukhov (2nd try) and Andrey Silnov (3rd try) were the only men to clear 2.34, and when both failed at 2.36, Ukhov was the victor based on the count-back.

At the Russian National Championships on 5 July 2012, Ukhov finished in first place with a (first jump) clearance of 2.39 m (7 ft 10 in), the highest jump in the world this year: he is still wearing only sprinter spikes with no support in the heels. Three jumpers cleared 2.35, securing their Olympic berths. When teammate Andrey Silnov cleared 2.37 to take the lead and Ukhov missed, Ivan then passed that height in favor of an attempt at 2.39 for the win. After clearing 2.39, he then took two attempts at 2.41, hoping to break his Russian record of 2.40.

=== 2012 London Olympics ===
Ukhov entered the 2012 London Olympics as the favorite. In the qualifying round on Sunday 5 August, Ukhov scaled 2.29 for an automatic berth in the finals. During the final held on Tuesday evening 7 August, Ukhov cleared 2.38 m (7 ft 9 1/2 in) for which he was placed first and was awarded the gold medal. (He made one failed attempt at a new Olympic record 2.40 and then retired.) However, in February 2019 Ukhov was disqualified from the competition due to a backdated doping ban. The gold medal was instead awarded to Erik Kynard.

=== 2013 indoor season ===
Ukhov's best indoors was also one of his earliest competitions, winning the high jump-only competition at Hustopece on 26 January 2013 with a first attempt clearance of 2.30, edging out Mutaz Essa Barshim who needed all 3 attempts to clear the same height.

=== 2013 outdoor season ===
Ukhov saved his best for last, but his season-best leap - a first try clearance of 2.35 - at the 2013 World Championships in Athletics in Moscow on 15 August 2013 was only good for 4th place, as two men cleared 2.38, and Ukrainian Bohdan Bondarenko established a new championship record of 2.41 to win the gold medal.

=== 2014 indoor season ===
Ukhov's indoor campaign in 2014 was his best season of his career, with three jumps of 2.40 or higher in the space of 6 weeks, though it would later be annulled due to doping charges. He finished a disappointing second at the World Indoor Championships on 9 March, clearing the winning height of 2.38 but losing the gold medal on the tie-breaking count-back. This medal would later be stripped.

11 January, 1st - 2.38 m: Ukhov opened his 2014 Indoor campaign on Saturday 11 January in the Russian city of Novocheboksarsk with a world-leading leap of 2.38. Competing at the Chuvashya Governor Cup, he cleared his first four heights – 2.15, 2.24, 2.30 and 2.35 – on his first attempt, equalling his best mark from the entire 2013 season. (By 2.30 he was jumping alone, as only one other jumper cleared 2.24) He then cleared 2.38 on his third attempt, and then made three attempts at 2.41, the last being very close with just his heel clipping the bar. It was his highest jump since his Olympic victory in August 2012, also 2.38. It also equaled his best ever seasonal debut as Ukhov jumped the same height in his opening competition of 2011 before going on to win the European indoor title. It improved by six centimeters the world-leading mark set by Andrey Silnov, who cleared 2.32 in December. Not only was the height remarkable for so early in the season, but for so early in the day – the Men's High Jump competition got underway at 11am local.

16 January, 1st - 2.41 m: Ukhov produced the best indoor performance in the world for 21 years when he cleared 2.41 at the Yuriy Lukasevich Memorial meeting in the Russian city of Chelyabinsk on Thursday 16 January. This added one centimeter to his own national indoor record, achieved in Athens five years earlier, and also to the Russian absolute record held jointly by himself and Vyacheslav Voronin, who jumped 2.40m outdoors in London back in 2000. Ukhov jumped 2.15, 2.23, 2.32 and 2.36 with his first attempts before getting over 2.41 m (7 ft 10 3/4 in) on his third attempt, just brushing the bar with his heels. He immediately asked the bar to be raised to an (absolute) world record height of 2.46, but then decided to rest without attempting. Compatriots Andriy Silnov and Yevgeniy Korshunov were second and third respectively, both going over 2.29.

- Statisticians at Track & Field News report only 3 men have ever jumped higher (indoors or outdoors), and this is the highest jump in history in the month of January.
- Note: Video of Ukhov's 2.41 leap in Chelyabinsk shows he is still competing in sprinter spikes, eschewing a jumping shoe.

28 January, 1st - 2.36 m: Ukhov won the "High Jump With Music Cup" meet in Moscow, with second attempt clearance of 2.36 m (7 ft 8 3/4 in). He was pushed by Ukrainian jumper Andriy Protsenko, who cleared 2.33 m (7 ft 7 1/2 in) for second place. Ukhov made one attempt at 2.40 and then retired, saving his legs for the "Winter Meet".

2 February, 1st - 2.36 m: Won the IAAF-approved "Russian Winter Meet" in Moscow for a fifth time, this one in a dominating fashion, with a first attempt clearance of 2.36 m (7 ft 8 3/4 in). He then attempted to break his own meet record (2.39) but failed in three tries at 2.40 m (7 ft 10 1/4 in), his only misses on the night. Only two other jumpers, Protsenko and (Russian) Daniel Tsyplakov, were able to clear 2.28.

8 February, 1st - 2.40 m: Won the 38th annual High Jump with Music meet at Arnstadt, Germany with a first try clearance of 2.40 m (7 ft 10 1/4 in) (breaking the old meet record of 2.38m) He was "pushed" by compatriot Aleksey Dmitrik, who improved his personal best by 4 cm when he cleared 2.40 on his second attempt. Dmitrik then made 3 tries at a Russian record 2.42, while Ukhov passed in order to try a World Indoor Record height of 2.44, his second and third attempts being very close. Note: Dmitrik is now the first jumper in history to leap 2.40 and finish second. Ukhov has 3 previous wins at Arnstadt, from 2009 to 2011, while Dmitrik won in 2012 and 2013.

18 February, 1st - 2.38 m: Won the Russian Indoor Nationals, held at the CSKA Indoor Arena in Moscow, with a jump of 2.38 m (7 ft 9 1/2 in), beating Daniil Tsyplakov who finished second with a personal best jump of 2.34. Ukhov then made two unsuccessful attempts at a would-be world indoor record height of 2.44 m (8 feet) and passed his final attempt. Afterwards he said he was simply tired, because with 37 jumpers in the competition it took a long time to get through the lower heights.

25 February, 1st - 2.42 m: Won at the O2 Arena in Prague with an absolute Russian record, equal European record, and 2014 world-leading height of 2.42 m (7 ft 11 1/4 in) on Tuesday 25 February. He did so in dominating fashion, taking just 4 jumps- all first attempt clearances at 2.15, 2.25, 2.33, and 2.42. A video camera focused on the bar revealed Ukhov cleared the record height with nearly 5 cm (2 inches) of daylight between his torso and the bar. Only Cuban legend Javier Sotomayor has jumped higher, with his indoor record of 2.43 set at the Indoor world championships in 1989. Ukhov then made three attempts at 2.44 m (8 feet), none of them very close. Ukhov's coach - former Olympic champion Sergey Klyugin - said afterwards that Ukhov was slightly frustrated by the placement of the high jump pit too close to the inside turn of the track, as this limited the length of his approach: he started his run-up from the base of the banked turn. There were only 4 men in the special high jump competition at the Prague Indoor Meet. After Ukhov and Russian compatriot Aleksey Dmitrik were the only ones to clear 2.33 (both on their first attempt) they agreed to immediately raise the bar to 2.42.

8−9 March, 2nd - 2.38 m: The 2014 IAAF World Indoor Championships was held in the seaside city of Sopot, in northern Poland. In the qualifying session on Saturday 8 March at noon, Ukhov took the bare minimum number of jumps (two) required to qualify amongst the top 8, with an effort of only 2.25. In the Finals on Sunday afternoon, all 8 men began jumping at 2.20. Ukhov then passed every-other height, jumping only at 2.29 and 2.34 and clearing both on his first attempts, while still wearing his warmup tights. He then passed at 2.36 and watched as Mutaz Essa Barshim (Qatar) and Andriy Protsenko (Ukraine) cleared on their first attempts. With the bar then raised to 2.38 Barshim again cleared on his first attempt, while Ukhov (his pants removed) needed all three tries to clear. Both men then failed at 2.40, and Ukhov was relegated to second place because of his misses at 2.38.

=== 2014 outdoor season ===
Ukhov won the first major international meeting of the season, the Diamond League meet in Doha, Qatar, on Friday evening 9 May with a "best in the world" jump of 2.41, which tied him for the third best jumper outdoors in history. He then made one attempt at 2.43 before retiring. In a bold move, after he missed his first attempt at 2.37 and both Erik Kynard and Derek Drouin cleared on their first attempts, Ukhov elected to pass, and then was the only jumper to clear 2.39 (on his first attempt). Drouin entered the meet with the world outdoor lead, having cleared 2.40 on 25 April.

=== Doping ===
On 1 February 2019, Ukhov was banned from athletics for four years due to doping. On appeal, his ban was reduced from four years to two years and nine months with all of his results from 16 July 2012 to 31 December 2014 disqualified, including his Olympic gold medal from 2012 and his European bronze medal from 2014. In 2022, Ukhov said he had not returned his medal to the International Olympic Committee, although he added: "If [they] need it, they can have it".

== Jumping shoes ==
In order to gain firm traction as they "plant" their take-off foot to jump, high jumpers are permitted to use a special shoe, one with a built-up sole – for comfort and stability – and which contains 6 or 7 spikes in the front and no more than 4 spikes in the heel. Ukhov is unique in that he uses ordinary sprint spikes when he competes, which lack the added traction in the heel. In a 2010 interview for the Russian sports daily Sovietskiy Sport, he was asked about the lack of heel spikes and said, "Yes, that's true. Before every season I think it's time to move on and use high jumping shoes but I still haven't switched to them. Somehow they do not work for me." Failure to use a "normal" jumping shoe does makes it difficult to jump in wet conditions. When it rained during the Men's High Jump final at the 2009 World Championships in Berlin, he finished in tenth place, saying "When the rain started, I started experimenting with new spikes but in vain". A year later, at the 2010 European Athletics Championships in Barcelona, heavy rains came just before the Men's High Jump final, but Ukhov said he "started with my sprint spikes and kept them on". He finished in second place.

Racing shoes were once limited to 6 spikes (or "pins") in the toe section, with an additional 4 allowed in the heel for jumping shoes. The IAAF changed its rules in the early 1990s to allow a maximum of 11 spikes/pins for all shoes: most high jumpers place 7 in the toe and 4 in the heel. Photographs taken during competitions reveal Ukhov uses 10 in the toe, none in the heel.

Ukhov's 2011 indoor season included three meets where he won and then attempted to set a world indoor record of 2.44 m (8 feet). In an interview for BBC News filmed in Moscow in early spring 2011, Ukhov admitted his difficulty of jumping in wet conditions without heel spikes and acknowledged this could be a liability at the 2012 Olympics in London. This did not materialize as he later won these Olympics, although his medal was stripped in 2019 for a doping violation.

== Personal life ==
Ukhov is 1.92 m (6 ft 3 1/2 in) and lists his competition weight as 83 kg (183 lb). He jumps off his left leg. At a press conference in Russia at the start of the 2011 indoor season, Ukhov said that the birth of his child had stabilized his life: "Having a family helps. If it weren't for my family, I would not be able to compete so consistently and successfully", he said. In an undated interview for BBC News filmed in Moscow – probably in early spring 2011 – Ukhov was shown walking in a snow-covered park with his wife, Polina, and baby daughter Melaniya.

According to the official website of Russian Athletics, as of early 2011, Ivan lives in Moscow and is trained by Sergey Klyugin (the 2000 Sydney Olympic Games high jump champion.) In an interview published at the end of the 2010 outdoor season, Ukhov said he began jumping under the tutelage of Yevgeniy Zagorulko, but "I could not win a major title", so two years ago (2008) he changed coaches to Klyugin: "Sergey had just finished competing himself and was coaching his wife Viktoriya (the 2009 European Athletics Indoor Championships high jump bronze medallist). He approached me and invited me to train with him and I said 'Let's give it a try'."

In a 2010 interview, Ukhov was asked about reports that his weight fluctuated. "Is it true that two days before an event you stop eating?", Ukhov answered: "No, I am responsible about these things, my weight when I am competing is about 85 kg (187 lb), but in the off-season my weight can go up to 105 kg (231 lb). I lose the kilos quickly when I am doing weight training. It only takes about two weeks to lose the weight." Another question was: "Many athletes complain that they feel weak when they lose only a few kilos, but here we are talking about 20 kg (44 lb). What does your coach think about this?", and Ukhov responded: "We had a training camp in Spain, and I think the extra weight helped. A bit of extra weight protects the muscles and ligaments. It is like training with a barbell – only it always with you." Although he stands well over 6 feet tall, Ukhov described his physique as "stocky".

== Major competition record ==
Year	Competition	Venue	Position	Notes
2004	World Junior Championships	Grosseto, Italy	13th (q)	2.10 m
2005	European Junior Championships	Kaunas, Lithuania	1st	2.23 m
2005	Universiade	İzmir, Turkey	4th	2.23 m
2006	European Championships	Gothenburg, Sweden	12th	2.20 m
2006	World Athletics Final	Stuttgart, Germany	5th	2.25 m
2009	European Indoor Championships	Turin, Italy	1st	2.32 m
2009	World Championships	Berlin, Germany	10th	2.23 m
2010	World Indoor Championships	Doha, Qatar	1st	2.36 m
2010	European Championships	Barcelona, Spain	2nd	2.31 m
2010	Diamond League	Worldwide	Series winner	High jump
2011	European Indoor Championships	Paris, France	1st	2.38 m
2011	World Championships	Daegu, South Korea	5th	2.32 m
2012	World Indoor Championships	Istanbul, Turkey	3rd	2.31 m
2012	Olympic Games	London, United Kingdom	DSQ (1st)	~~2.38 m~~
2013	Universiade	Kazan, Russia	DSQ (5th)	~~2.28 m~~
2013	World Championships	Moscow, Russia	DSQ (4th)	~~2.35 m~~
2014	World Indoor Championships	Sopot, Poland	DSQ (2nd)	~~2.38 m~~
2014	European Championships	Zurich, Switzerland	DSQ (3rd)	~~2.30 m~~
2015	World Championships	Beijing, China	24th (q)	2.26 m

== See also ==
- List of doping cases in athletics

Records
Preceded by Carlo Thränhardt	Men's High Jump European Indoor Record Holder; 24 February 2014 – (shared with Carlo Thränhardt)	Succeeded by Incumbent
Sporting positions
Preceded by (Sweden) Stefan Holm (i)	Men's High Jump Best Year Performance alongside (Russia) Yaroslav Rybakov (2006, i), (Russia) Andrey Silnov (2006); 2006-2007(i)	Succeeded by (Russia) Yaroslav Rybakov (i) (Russia) Andrey Silnov
Preceded by (Russia) Yaroslav Rybakov (i) (Russia) Andrey Silnov	Men's High Jump Best Year Performance alongside (Qatar) Mutaz Essa Barshim (2012); 2009-2011(i), 2012	Succeeded by (Ukraine) Bohdan Bondarenko
