= Tom Parsons (high jumper) =

British high jumper (born 1984)

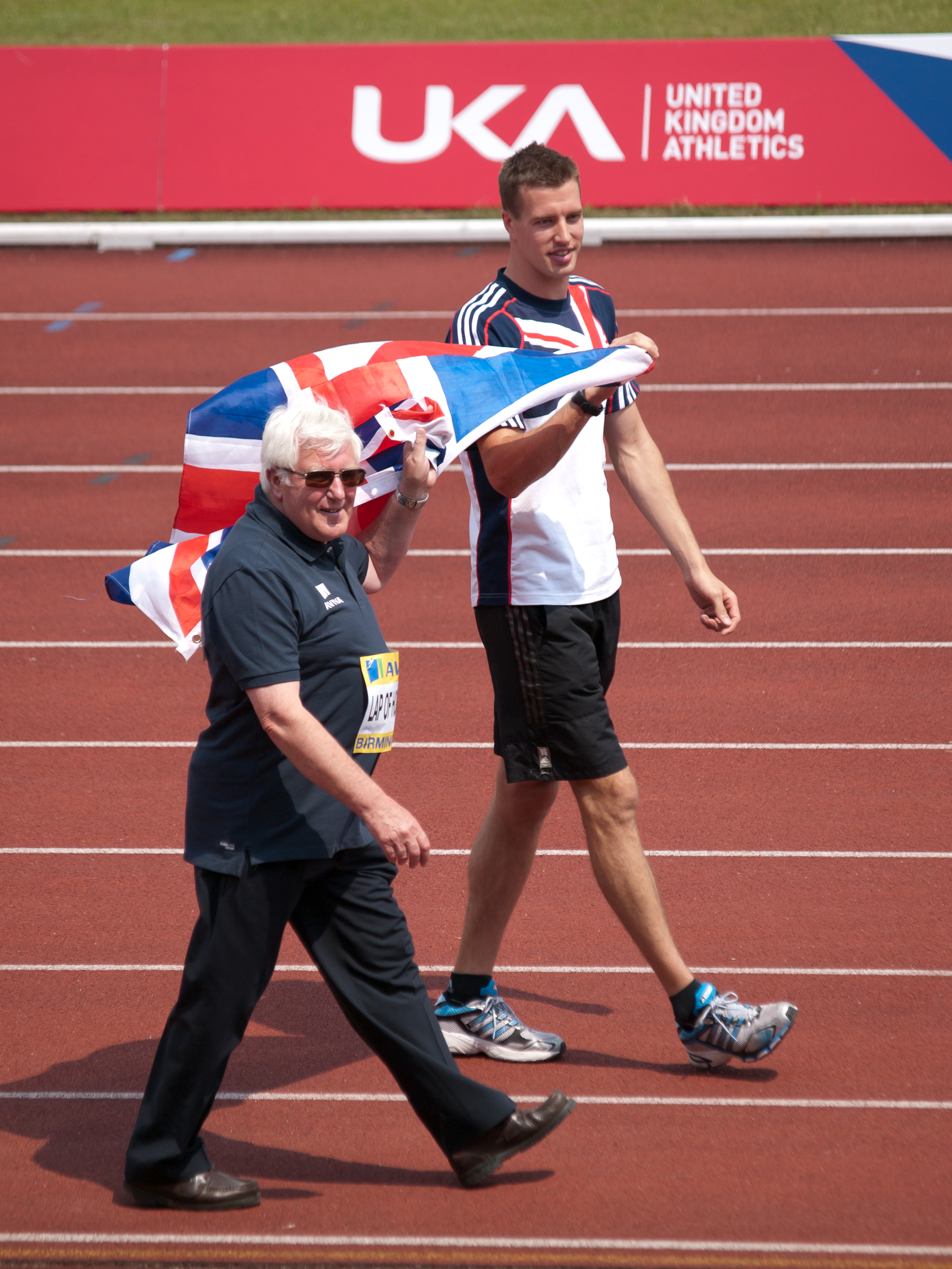
- Parsons in 2010 (right)

Personal information
- Nationality: British (English)
- Born: 5 May 1984 (age 41) Birmingham, England
- Height: 190 cm (6 ft 3 in)
- Weight: 78 kg (172 lb)

Sport
- Sport: Athletics
- Event: high jump
- Club: Birchfield Harriers

Thomas Martin Parsons (born 5 May 1984) is a British former high jump athlete who competed at the 2008 Summer Olympics.

== Biography ==
Parsons was educated at King Edward VI Five Ways school in Birmingham. He studied for a BSC in Sport and PE at UWIC.

Parsons finished 20th in the 2003 European Juniors, 17th in the 2005 European U23 championships and 10th in the 2005 World University Games. He represented England at the 2006 Commonwealth Games in Melbourne, where he finished 11th and 10th in the 2007 World Championships in Athletics at Osaka.

Parsons represented Great Britain at the 2008 Summer Olympics in the high jump where he finished 8th with a jump of 2.25.

He has a personal best of 2.30 metres outdoors (2008) and 2.31 metres indoors (2010) and was twice British high jump champion after winning the British Athletics Championships in 2008 and 2011.

He went to a second and third Commonwealth Games, when he represented England at the 2010 Commonwealth Games in Delhi and the 2014 Commonwealth Games in Glasgow.

== Competition record ==
Year	Competition	Venue	Position	Notes
Representing Great Britain and England
2003	European Junior Championships	Tampere, Finland	20th (q)	2.10 m
2005	European U23 Championships	Erfurt, Germany	17th (q)	2.18 m
2005	Universiade	İzmir, Turkey	10th	2.15 m
2006	Commonwealth Games	Melbourne, Australia	11th	2.10 m
2007	World Championships	Osaka, Japan	10th	2.26 m
2008	Olympic Games	Beijing, China	8th	2.25 m
2010	World Indoor Championships	Doha, Qatar	9th (q)	2.26 m
2010	European Championships	Barcelona, Spain	10th (q)	2.23 m
2010	Commonwealth Games	Delhi, India	5th	2.23 m
2011	European Indoor Championships	Paris, France	9th (q)	2.22 m
2011	World Championships	Daegu, South Korea	19th (q)	2.25 m
2012	European Championships	Helsinki, Finland	28th (q)	2.10 m
2014	World Indoor Championships	Sopot, Poland	12th (q)	2.25 m
2014	Commonwealth Games	Glasgow, United Kingdom	13th	2.16 m
