= Janick Klausen =

Danish high jumper

Personal information
- Nationality: Danish
- Born: 3 April 1993 (age 33)
- Height: 1.77 m (5 ft 10 in)
- Weight: 70 kg (154 lb)

Sport
- Sport: Track and field
- Event: High jump
- Club: Aarhus 1900

Achievements and titles
- Personal best(s): 2.28 m 2.27 m (indoors)
Medal record
Men's athletics
Representing Denmark
European Junior Championships
Silver medal – second place	2011 Tallinn	High jump
World Youth Championships
Silver medal – second place	2009 Brixen	High jump

Janick Klausen (born 3 April 1993) is a Danish high jumper.

== Achievements ==
Year	Competition	Venue	Position	Event	Notes
Representing Denmark
2009	World Youth Championships	Brixen, Italy	2nd	High jump	2.20 m
2009	European Youth Olympic Festival	Tampere, Finland	3rd	High jump	2.14 m
2010	European Championships	Barcelona, Spain	26th (q)	High jump	2.15 m
2010	World Junior Championships	Moncton, Canada	10th	High jump	2.17 m
2011	European Indoor Championships	Paris, France	7th	High jump	2.25 m
2015	European U23 Championships	Tallinn, Estonia	9th	High jump	2.15 m
