= 2012 IAAF World Indoor Championships – Men's high jump =

The men's high jump at the 2012 IAAF World Indoor Championships was held at the Ataköy Athletics Arena on 10 and 11 March.

== Medalists ==
Gold	Silver	Bronze
Dimitrios Chondrokoukis; Greece	Andrey Silnov; Russia	Ivan Ukhov; Russia

== Records ==
Standing records prior to the 2012 IAAF World Indoor Championships
World record	Javier Sotomayor (CUB)	2.43	Budapest, Hungary	4 March 1989
Championship record	Javier Sotomayor (CUB)	2.43	Budapest, Hungary	4 March 1989
World Leading	Mutaz Essa Barshim (QAT)	2.37	Hangzhou, China	19 February 2012
African record	Anthony Idiata (NGR)	2.32	Patras, Greece	15 February 2000
Asian record	Mutaz Essa Barshim (QAT)	2.37	Hangzhou, China	19 February 2012
European record	Carlo Thränhardt (FRG)	2.42	Berlin, Germany	26 February 1988
North and Central American and Caribbean record	Javier Sotomayor (CUB)	2.43	Budapest, Hungary	4 March 1989
Oceanian record	Tim Forsyth (AUS)	2.33	Balingen, Germany	16 February 1997
South American record	Gilmar Mayo (COL)	2.27	Piraeus, Greece	24 February 1999

== Qualification standards ==
Indoor
2.29

== Schedule ==
Date	Time	Round
March 10, 2012	11:25	Qualification
March 11, 2012	15:30	Final

== Results ==
=== Qualification ===
Qualification standard: 2.32 m (Q) or at least best 8 qualified (q). 19 athletes from 15 countries participated. The qualification round started at 11:25 and ended at 13:01.

Rank	Athlete	Nationality	2.18	2.23	2.26	2.29	Result	Notes
1	Raúl Spank	Germany	o	o	o	o	2.29	q
1	Dimitrios Chondrokoukis	Greece	o	o	o	o	2.29	q, SB
1	Mutaz Essa Barshim	Qatar	o	o	o	o	2.29	q
4	Zhang Guowei	China	o	o	xo	o	2.29	q, SB
5	Trevor Barry	Bahamas	o	o	xxo	o	2.29	q
6	Robert Grabarz	Great Britain	o	o	o	xo	2.29	q
6	Jesse Williams	United States	o	o	o	xo	2.29	q
8	Ivan Ukhov	Russia	o	o	xo	xo	2.29	q
9	Andrey Silnov	Russia	o	o	xxo	xo	2.29	q
10	Konstadinos Baniotis	Greece	o	xo	o	xxo	2.29	q
11	Viktor Ninov	Bulgaria	o	o	o	xxx	2.26	
12	Majed Aldin Ghazal	Syria	xxo	xo	xo	xxx	2.26	NR
13	Jaroslav Bába	Czech Republic	o	o	xxx		2.22	
13	Samson Oni	Great Britain	o	o	xxx		2.22	
15	Donald Thomas	Bahamas	o	xo	xxx		2.22	
15	Silvano Chesani	Italy	o	xo	xxx		2.22	
15	Mihai Donisan	Romania	o	xo	xxx		2.22	
15	Andriy Protsenko	Ukraine	o	xo	xxx		2.22	
19	Diego Ferrín	Ecuador	o	xxo	xxx		2.22	SB

=== Final ===
The final started at 15:31 and ended at 17:10.

Rank	Athlete	Nationality	2.20	2.24	2.28	2.31	2.33	2.35	Result	Notes
1st place, gold medalist(s)	Dimitrios Chondrokoukis	Greece	o	o	xo	xo	o	xx	2.33	PB
2nd place, silver medalist(s)	Andrey Silnov	Russia	o	o	o	xo	xo	xxx	2.33	
3rd place, bronze medalist(s)	Ivan Ukhov	Russia	o	xo	o	o	xxx		2.31	
4	Zhang Guowei	China	o	o	xo	xo	xxx		2.31	=NR
4	Konstantinos Baniotis	Greece	o	o	xo	xo	xx-	x	2.31	SB
6	Robert Grabarz	Great Britain	o	o	o	xxo	xxx		2.31	
6	Jesse Williams	United States	o	o	o	xxo	xxx		2.31	
8	Trevor Barry	Bahamas	o	o	xo	xxo	xxx		2.31	SB
9	Mutaz Essa Barshim	Qatar	o	o	o	xxx			2.28	
9	Raul Spank	Germany	o	o	o	xxx			2.28	
