= Oleksandr Nartov =

Ukrainian high jumper (born 1988)

Oleksandr Nartov (Ukrainian: Олександр Нартов, born 21 May 1988) is a Ukrainian high jumper.

He won the silver medal at the 2003 World Youth Championships and the 2005 World Youth Championships, the gold medal at the 2007 European Junior Championships, the bronze medal at the 2007 Summer Universiade and the silver medal at the 2009 European U23 Championships. He competed at the 2008 Olympic Games and the 2009 European Indoor Championships without reaching the final.

His personal best jump is 2.31 metres, achieved in February 2012 in Berdychiv.

== Competition record ==
Year	Competition	Venue	Position	Notes
Representing Ukraine
2003	World Youth Championships	Sherbrooke, Canada	2nd	2.11 m
2005	World Youth Championships	Marrakesh, Morocco	2nd	2.18 m
2006	World Junior Championships	Beijing, China	22nd (q)	2.10 m
2007	European Junior Championships	Hengelo, Netherlands	1st	2.23 m
2007	Universiade	Bangkok, Thailand	3rd	2.26 m
2008	Olympic Games	Beijing, China	39th (q)	2.10 m
2009	European Indoor Championships	Turin, Italy	15th (q)	2.22 m
2009	European U23 Championships	Kaunas, Lithuania	2nd	2.26 m
2010	European Championships	Barcelona, Spain	6th	2.26 m
2011	European Indoor Championships	Paris, France	18th (q)	2.17 m
