= Jesse Williams (high jumper) =

American high jumper

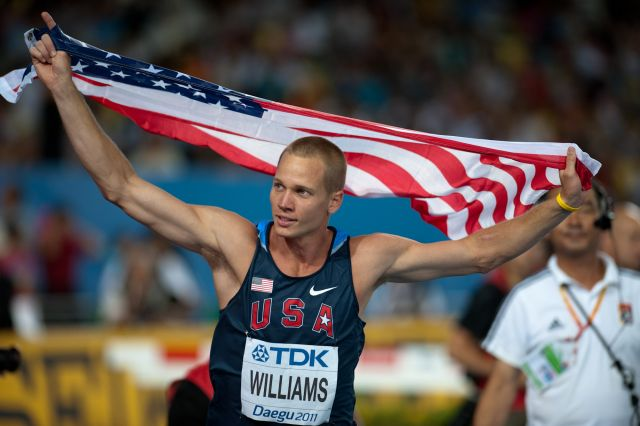
- Williams at the 2011 World Championships Athletics in Daegu

Personal information
- Born: December 27, 1983 (age 42) Modesto, California, U.S.
- Home town: Raleigh, North Carolina, U.S.
- Height: 1.83 m (6 ft 0 in)
- Weight: 82 kg (181 lb)

Sport
- Country: United States
- Sport: Athletics
- Event: High jump
Medal record
World Championships
| Gold medal – first place | 2011 Daegu | High jump |
- Updated on 15 August 2012

Jesse Daniel Williams (born December 27, 1983) is an American high jumper and the 2011 World Champion. He was ranked the #2 high jumper in the world, outdoors, in 2010 and #1 high jumper in the world in 2011. He has jumped 53 centimeters above his height, a differential which places him among the top 20 jumpers of all time.

== Early life and college ==
Williams attended high school at Broughton High School in Raleigh, North Carolina. He won three North Carolina 4A high jump state titles while attending Broughton High School. He held the North Carolina high school state meet record in the high jump with a jump of 2.18m (7' 2") set in 2002, until Tanner Anderson (East Burke High School/Duke University) jumped 2.20m (7' 2.5") in 2010.

In college, he attended North Carolina State University for one year (2003) before transferring and finishing his student-athlete career at the University of Southern California in Los Angeles. He won the NCAA track and field championships indoors 2005 and 2006 and outdoors in 2005 and 2006 becoming one of the few people to ever do so in the history of NCAA track and field. He is the school and Pac-10 record holder with a leap of 2.32 meters (7' 7 1/4").

== Nationally Ranked Junior in 2002 through Olympics in 2008 ==
Williams finished fourth at the 2002 World Junior Championships, eighth at the 2006 World Athletics Final and 2007 World Athletics Final and third at the 2008 World Athletics Final sixth at the 2008 World Indoor Championships. His personal best jump is 2.36 metres, achieved in February 2009 in Banská Bystrica. He was the 2008 Olympic Trials champion in the high jump and competed for the United States in the 2008 Summer Olympics in Beijing. He did not progress beyond the qualifying rounds.

== Hitting the Heights in 2009 ==
During the 2009 indoor season he validated his off-season training at the elite Europa SC High Jump invitational, held at Banska Bystrica, Slovakia, on February 9, 2009. Williams set a personal best of 2.36m, but finished 2nd (on misses) to Swedish jumper Linus Thornblad (also 2.36). This was a significant improvement on William's previous indoor best, 2.32, set at the Banska Bystrica meet in 2008.

Unhappy with his failure to qualify for the Olympic final, Williams set his sights on the 2009 US Championships, saying "this year is a redemption year. I really feel like I can win a medal". In that meet Jesse jumped 2.28 meters on his third attempt to earn fourth place. At the 2010 IAAF World Indoor Championships in Doha, he claimed fifth place in the final (2.28m) while fellow American Dusty Jonas won the bronze.

At the Karlstad Grand Prix meet in Karlstad, Sweden on July 15, 2010 – also known as the "Stefan Holm Invitational" – Williams outdueled Linus Thornblad (the crowd favorite). The two were then the top two jumpers in 2010 and were tied through 2.22m, but Williams pulled ahead with a first try clearance of 2.25, and won with another first attempt clearance at 2.28m (7' 6", which Thornblad failed to clear). Williams finished the meet with three tries at 2.31. At the 2010 USA Outdoor Championships, Williams jumped 2.26 meters on his first attempt, with no misses in the competition at any height, for the gold medal. Later that year he took second place in the inaugural Diamond League, having 13 points against Russia's Ivan Ukhov who had 20 points.

== World Champion in 2011 ==
Jumping for Team Nike/Oregon Track Club, Williams broke Hollis Conway's long-standing meet record at the Mt. SAC Relays in Walnut, California on April 16, 2011. Video of his jumps shows Williams used a 10-step, classic "J" approach. After needing all three tries to clear 2.31m (7' 7") – keeping him in second place – he cleared 2.34m (7' 8 1/4") on his first attempt (and ninth jump overall) to win the competition: his mark also improved the stadium record. He then made two attempts at a new personal best 2.37m (7' 9 1/4") before retiring. The 7' 8" jump ties his personal best outdoors, a height he first achieved on May 9, 2009, in Eugene, OR.

Williams won the first Diamond League meet of the year, at Doha, Qatar, on Friday May 6, setting a new meet record of 2.33 (7' 8"). Three men jumped 2.31, but Williams was the leader on the basis of clearing that height on his first attempt. Kyriakos Ioannou (Cyprus) put the pressure on by clearing 2.33 on his third effort, but Williams responded immediately with his third try clearance, thereby retaining the lead on the count-back at 2.31: both then failed at 2.35.

Williams had his best meet at the US Track & Field Championships, held at Hayward Field, Eugene, Oregon, on Sunday June 26, 2011. Jumping in the green singlet of the Oregon Track Club Elite, he won the event with a Personal Best of 2.37 (7' 9 1/4"), which moved him to "equal third" on the all-time US outdoor list, behind only Charles Austin and Hollis Conway. The mark was a new record for the Championship meet, a record for Hayward Field and the highest jump in the world, to date, outdoors in 2011 (trailing only the 2.38 cleared – 3 times – by Ivan Ukhov during the 2011 indoor season.) In the Championship, Williams opened at 2.20 and cleared every height on his first attempt. At 2.31 (7' 7") he was tied for first with Dustin Jonas (also no misses), but Williams locked-up the win at 2.34 (7' 8") on his first try. With no one else remaining in competition he cleared a PR 2.37 on his third try, and made three attempts to set a new American Record of 2.41 (7' 10 3/4") but failed to break the 2.40 mark set by Charles Austin in 1991. It was William's first-ever attempt to break the American Record and afterwards he said his third try at 2.41 was "decent" (his 11th jump overall).

At the 2011 World Championships in Daegu, South Korea, Williams won the high jump title with a clean round to the height of 2.35 m to edge Aleksey Dmitrik and Trevor Barry while year leading Ukhov didn't make the medal stand. It was the first high jump world title for an American in twenty years.

== Olympics in 2012 ==
Williams won the 2012 USA Indoor Championships in Albuquerque, NM, on February 25, with a jump of 2.29m (7' 6"). He trailed Jamie Nieto, who cleared 2.26 on his first attempt and then elected to pass at 2.29. Williams cleared on his third attempt, and then both men failed at 2.31 (7' 7"). On June 9 Williams won the Adidas Grand Prix New York Diamond League Meeting. He won with a meeting record 2.36m (7–8.75).

Williams finished fourth in the U.S. Olympic Trials, but the third-place finisher — Nick Ross — had not made an Olympic 'A' standard, unlike Williams, so the world champion earned a spot on the Olympic team through reprieve.

At the games Williams qualified for the final round with a height of 2.29m, and finished 9th overall.

== Personal Details ==
Williams was born December 27, 1983. He is 81 kg and his height is 1.84m (6 feet 1/2 inch, and 179 pounds). He jumps off his right foot. His indoor personal best is 2.36m (7' 8 3/4"), achieved at Banska Bystrica, Slovakia, on February 11, 2009. His outdoor personal best is 2.37m (7' 9 1/4"), which he cleared to win the 2011 US Track & Field Championships in Eugene, Oregon, on June 26, 2011: that mark placed Williams "equal third" on the all-time US list outdoors.

== Achievements ==
| Year | Competition | Venue | Position | Notes |
Representing the United States
| 2002 | World Junior Championships | Kingston, Jamaica | 4th | 2.21 m |
| 2005 | World Championships | Helsinki, Finland | 17th (q) | 2.24 m |
| 2006 | World Athletics Final | Stuttgart, Germany | 8th | 2.20 m |
| 2007 | World Championships | Osaka, Japan | 25th (q) | 2.23 m |
| 2007 | World Athletics Final | Stuttgart, Germany | 8th | 2.24 m |
| 2008 | World Indoor Championships | Valencia, Spain | 6th | 2.27 m |
| 2008 | Olympic Games | Beijing, China | 19th (q) | 2.25 m |
| 2008 | World Athletics Final | Stuttgart, Germany | 3rd | 2.29 m |
| 2009 | World Athletics Final | Thessaloniki, Greece | 3rd | 2.29 m |
| 2011 | World Championships | Daegu, South Korea | 1st | 2.35 m |
| 2012 | World Indoor Championships | Istanbul, Turkey | 6th | 2.31 m |
| 2012 | Olympic Games | London, United Kingdom | 9th | 2.25 m |
| 2013 | World Championships | Moscow, Russia | 23rd (q) | 2.22 m |
| 2015 | Pan American Games | Toronto, Canada | 4th | 2.28 m |
| 2015 | NACAC Championships | San José, Costa Rica | 4th | 2.15 m |
| 2015 | World Championships | Beijing, China | 22nd (q) | 2.26 m |

Awards
| Preceded by David Oliver | Men's Jesse Owens Award; 2011 | Succeeded by Ashton Eaton |
