= 2009 European Athletics U23 Championships – Men's high jump =

The men's high jump event at the 2009 European Athletics U23 Championships was held in Kaunas, Lithuania, at S. Dariaus ir S. Girėno stadionas (Darius and Girėnas Stadium) on 17 and 19 July.

== Medalists ==
Gold	Sylwester Bednarek; Poland
Silver	Oleksandr Nartov; Ukraine
Bronze	Andriy Protsenko; Ukraine

== Results ==
=== Final ===
19 July

Rank	Name	Nationality	Attempts									Result	Notes
Rank	Name	Nationality	2.05	2.10	2.14	2.18	2.21	2.24	2.26	2.28	2.31	Result	Notes
1st place, gold medalist(s)	Sylwester Bednarek	Poland	–	o	o	o	o	xxo	o	o	xx	2.28	
2nd place, silver medalist(s)	Oleksandr Nartov	Ukraine	–	o	o	o	o	xxo	o	x–	xx	2.26	
3rd place, bronze medalist(s)	Andriy Protsenko	Ukraine	–	o	o	o	o	o	xx–	x		2.24	
4	Olivér Harsányi	Hungary	–	xo	xo	xxo	xxo	o	xxx			2.24	
5	Silvano Chesani	Italy	o	o	xo	xxo	xxo	xo	xxx			2.24	
6	Marco Fassinotti	Italy	o	o	o	xo	xxo	xxx				2.21	
7	Yevgeniy Shishakov	Russia	o	xo	o	xo	xxo	xxx				2.21	
8	Raivydas Stanys	Lithuania	o	o	xo	xxo	xxo	xxx				2.21	
9	Mehdi Alkhatib	Sweden	–	o	o	o	xxx					2.18	
10	Mihai Donisan	Romania	o	o	ox	o	xxx					2.18	
11	Robbie Grabarz	United Kingdom	–	xo	xo	xxo	xxx					2.18	
12	Dimitrios Hondrokoukis	Greece	o	o	o	xxx						2.14	
13	Viktor Ninov	Bulgaria	o	o	xxx							2.10	

=== Qualifications ===
17 July
Qualifying 2.22 or 12 best to the Final

==== Group A ====
Rank	Name	Nationality	Result	Notes
1	Andriy Protsenko	Ukraine	2.20	q
2	Mehdi Alkhatib	Sweden	2.17	q
2	Robbie Grabarz	United Kingdom	2.17	q
4	Dimitrios Hondrokoukis	Greece	2.17	q
5	Raivydas Stanys	Lithuania	2.17	q
6	Mustafa Onur Demir	Turkey	2.17	
6	Abdoulaye Diarra	France	2.17	
8	Brede Raa Ellingsen	Norway	2.14	
9	Riccardo Cecolin	Italy	2.14	
10	Marios Nicolaou	Cyprus	2.10	

==== Group B ====
Rank	Name	Nationality	Result	Notes
1	Sylwester Bednarek	Poland	2.20	q
2	Olivér Harsányi	Hungary	2.20	q
2	Oleksandr Nartov	Ukraine	2.20	q
4	Silvano Chesani	Italy	2.20	q
5	Viktor Ninov	Bulgaria	2.17	q
6	Marco Fassinotti	Italy	2.17	q
7	Mihai Donisan	Romania	2.17	q
8	Yevgeniy Shishakov	Russia	2.17	q
9	Niko Kyyhkynen	Finland	2.17	
10	Simón Siverio	Spain	2.14	

== Participation ==
According to an unofficial count, 20 athletes from 17 countries participated in the event.

- Bulgaria (1)
- Cyprus (1)
- Finland (1)
- France (1)
- Greece (1)
- Hungary (1)
- Italy (3)
- Lithuania (1)
- Norway (1)
- Poland (1)
- Romania (1)
- Russia (1)
- Spain (1)
- Sweden (1)
- Turkey (1)
- Ukraine (2)
- United Kingdom (1)
