= Osku Torro =

Finnish high jumper

Personal information
- Born: August 21, 1979 (age 46) Jyväskylä, Finland
- Height: 1.83 m (6 ft 0 in)
- Weight: 72 kg (159 lb)

Sport
- Country: Finland
- Sport: Athletics
- Event: High jump
- Updated on 15 August 2012

Osku Torro (born 21 August 1979) is a Finnish high jumper.

He was born in Jyväskylä. He competed at the 2006 European Championships, the 2007 European Indoor Championships, the 2010 World Indoor Championships and the 2010 European Championships without reaching the final.

His personal best jump was 2.27 metres, achieved in August 2007 in Lappeenranta and also in July 2008 in Tampere. He has 2.33 metres on the indoor track, achieved in February 2011 in Tampere. This is a Finnish indoor record.

== Competition record ==
Year	Competition	Venue	Position	Notes
Representing Finland
2005	Universiade	İzmir, Turkey	–	NM
2006	European Championships	Gothenburg, Sweden	23rd (q)	2.15 m
2007	European Indoor Championships	Birmingham, United Kingdom	14th (q)	2.23 m
2007	Universiade	Bangkok, Thailand	9th	2.15 m
2010	World Indoor Championships	Doha, Qatar	11th (q)	2.23 m
2010	European Championships	Barcelona, Spain	21st (q)	2.19 m
2011	European Indoor Championships	Paris, France	13th (q)	2.22 m
2011	World Championships	Daegu, South Korea	31st (q)	2.16 m
2012	European Championships	Helsinki, Finland	18th (q)	2.19 m
2012	Olympic Games	London, United Kingdom	16th (q)	2.21 m
