= Silvano Chesani =

Italian high jumper (born 1988)

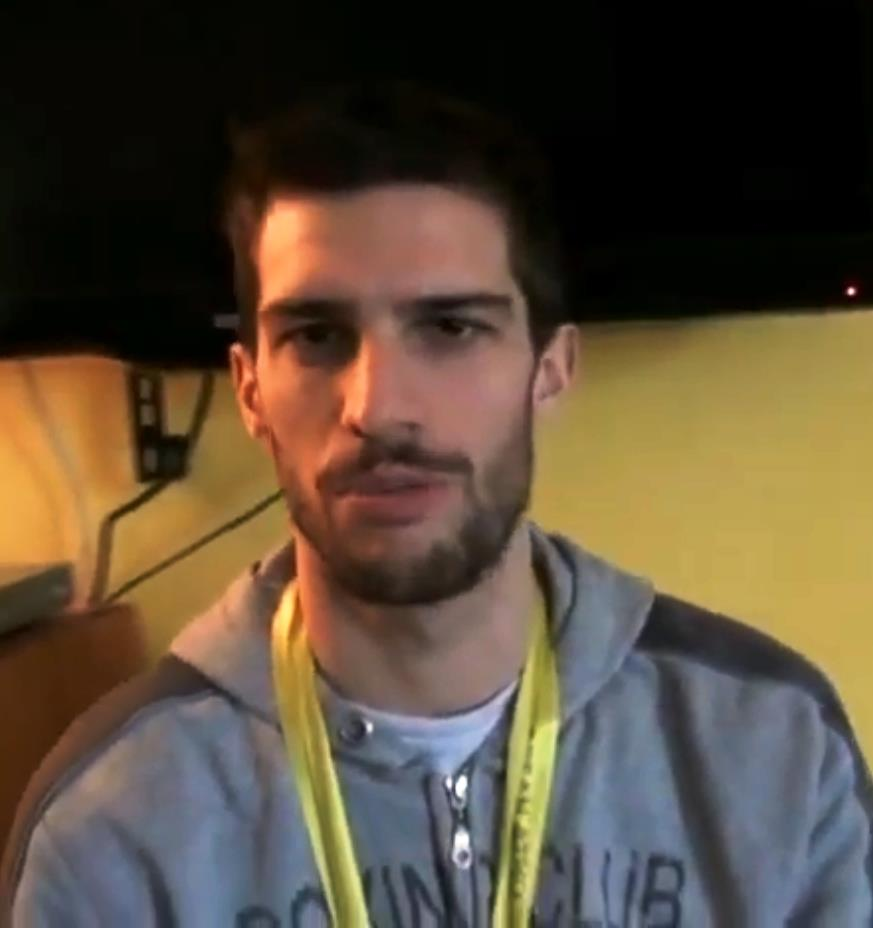
- Chesani in 2015.

Personal information
- National team: Italy
- Born: 17 July 1988 (age 37) Trento, Italy
- Height: 1.90 m (6 ft 3 in)
- Weight: 75 kg (165 lb)

Sport
- Sport: Athletics
- Event: High jump
- Club: G.S. Fiamme Oro
- Coached by: Giuliano Corradi

Achievements and titles
- Personal best: High jump: 2.33 m (2013)
Medal record
European Indoor Championships
Silver medal – second place	2015 Prague	High jump
Mediterranean Games
Silver medal – second place	2013 Mersin	High jump

Silvano Chesani (born 17 July 1988) is an Italian high jumper.

== Biography ==
In his career he participated in two editions of the World Athletics Championships and won two national championship. In 2012, he jumped 2.31, his personal best, obtaining the qualification standard for 2012 Summer Olympics. In 2007 he was warned after testing positive for Formoterol.

In the indoor sean 2013, at the 2013 Italian Athletics Indoor Championships equals the Italian record in the high jump, 24-year-old was in fact the former was established by Marcello Benvenuti in 1989.

== National records ==
- High jump indoor: 2.33 ( (Italy) Ancona, 17 February 2013) - Current holder

== Progression ==
Outdoor

Year	Performance	Venue	Date	World Ranking
2012	2.22	(Italy) Brixen	8-7-2012	
2011	2.28	(Italy) Orvieto (Italy) Turin	26-6-2011; 22-5-2011	18th
2010	2.25	(Italy) Lodi	16-5-2010	
2009	2.24	(Lithuania) Kaunas	18-7-2009	
2008	2.12	(Italy) Formia	24-5-2008	
2007	2.21	(Netherlands) Hengelo	21-7-2007	
2006	2.15	(Italy) Pergine Valsugana	1-9-2006	

Indoor

Year	Performance	Venue	Date	World Ranking
2013	2.33	(Italy) Ancona	17-2-2013	5th
2012	2.31	(Italy) Ancona	26-2-2012	9th
2011	2.22	(Italy) Dresden	28/01/2011	

== Achievements ==
Year	Competition	Venue	Result	Event	Measure	Notes
Representing Italy
2007	European Junior Championships	(Netherlands) Hengelo	5th	High jump	2.21 m	
2009	European U23 Championships	(Lithuania) Kaunas	5th	High jump	2.24 m	
2011	World Championships	(South Korea) Daegu	22nd	High jump	2.25 m	
2012	World Indoor Championships	(Turkey) Istanbul	15th (q)	High jump	2.22 m	
2013	European Indoor Championships	(Sweden) Gothenburg	Qual.	High jump	2.23 m	
2015	European Indoor Championships	(Czech Republic) Prague	2nd	High jump	2.31 m	
2017	European Indoor Championships	(Serbia) Belgrade	6th	High jump	2.27 m	

== National titles ==
- Italian Athletics Championships
  - High jump: 2011
- Italian Athletics Indoor Championships
  - High jump: 2012, 2013

== See also ==
- Italian records in athletics
- Men's high jump Italian record progression
- Italian all-time top lists - High jump
