= Normunds Pūpols =

Latvian high jumper

Normunds Pūpols (born 5 October 1984 in Ventspils) is a Latvian high jumper.

He is a six-time Latvian champion in high jump and has a personal best of 2.28 metres, set in 2006.

== Achievements ==
| Year | Competition | Venue | Position | Notes |
Representing Latvia
| 2005 | European U23 Championships | Erfurt, Germany | 19th (q) | 2.18 m |
| 2005 | Universiade | İzmir, Turkey | 18th (q) | 2.15 m |
| 2006 | European Championships | Gothenburg, Sweden | 15th (q) | 2.23 m |
| 2007 | European Indoor Championships | Birmingham, United Kingdom | 15th (q) | 2.18 m |
| 2007 | Universiade | Bangkok, Thailand | 15th (q) | 2.15 m |
| 2009 | European Indoor Championships | Turin, Italy | 30th (q) | 2.12 m |
| 2010 | European Championships | Barcelona, Spain | 18th (q) | 2.19 m |
| 2011 | Universiade | Shenzhen, China | 15th (q) | 2.15 m |

== Personal bests ==
| | Record | Venue | Year |
|---|---|---|---|
| Outdoor | 2.28 | Riga, Latvia | 2006 |
| Indoor | 2.21 | Kuldīga, Latvia | 2009 |
