= Mária Melová-Henkel =

Slovak high jumper

Personal information
- Nationality: (Slovakia) Slovak
- Born: October 21, 1975 (age 50)

Sport
- Country: Slovakia
- Sport: Track and field
- Event: high jump

Achievements and titles
- Personal bests: High jump (outdoor): 1.92m; High jump (indoor): 1.96m (February 1997)
- Updated on 17 September 2015

Mária Melová-Henkel (born 21 October 1975) is a retired Slovak high jumper. She has held the national record in the indoor high jump since 1997, with a height of 1.96 metres. (Note: outdoor mark ratified as absolute record)

Melová finished fifth at the 1999 World Indoor Championships. She also competed at the 1997 World Indoor Championships and the 2002 European Championships without reaching the final. Her personal best outdoor jump is 1.92 metres.

In February 1997 in Banská Bystrica, Melová jumped 1.96 metres to win an indoor competition, which was the highest mark ever cleared by a Slovak female athlete and a national indoor record. She finished ahead of her closest competitors Zuzana Kováčiková and Viktoriya Fyodorova, who both passed 1.93 metres.
