= Peter Horák =

Slovak high jumper

Peter Horák (born 7 December 1983 in Bratislava) is a Slovak high jumper.

== Achievements ==
Year	Competition	Venue	Position	Event	Notes
Representing Slovakia
2000	World Junior Championships	Santiago, Chile	16th (q)	High jump	2.10 m
2001	European Junior Championships	Grosseto, Italy	10th	High jump	2.08 m
2002	World Junior Championships	Kingston, Jamaica	12th	High jump	2.10 m
2003	European U23 Championships	Bydgoszcz, Poland	10th	High jump	2.18 m
2005	European U23 Championships	Erfurt, Germany	17th (q)	High jump	2.18 m
2006	European Championships	Gothenburg, Sweden	15th (q)	High jump	2.23 m
2007	Universiade	Bangkok, Thailand	6th	High jump	2.20 m
2007	World Championships	Osaka, Japan	13th (q)	High jump	2.23 m
2008	Olympic Games	Beijing, China	33rd (q)	High jump	2.15 m
2009	World Championships	Berlin, Germany	27th (q)	High jump	2.20 m
2010	European Championships	Barcelona, Spain	10th	High jump	2.19 m
2011	European Indoor Championships	Paris, France	18th (q)	High jump	2.17 m
2012	European Championships	Helsinki, Finland	19th (q)	High jump	2.19 m
2013	European Indoor Championships	Gothenburg, Sweden	25th (q)	High jump	2.13 m
