= Aleksandr Shustov =

Russian high jumper

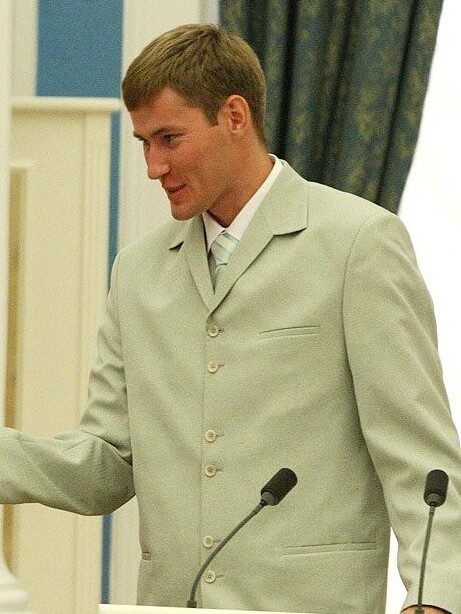
- Shustov in 2010

Personal information
- Born: 29 June 1984 (age 42) Karaganda, Kazakh SSR, Soviet Union
- Height: 1.88 m (6 ft 2 in)

Sport
- Event: High jump
- Club: CSKA Moscow

Achievements and titles
- Personal best(s): 2.33 m 2.34 m (indoors)
Medal record
Representing Russia
European Championships
Gold medal – first place	2010 Barcelona	High jump
European Indoor Championships
Bronze medal – third place	2011 Paris	High jump

Aleksandr Andreyevich Shustov (Russian: Александр Андреевич Шустов), born 29 June 1984) is a male high jumper from Russia, best known for winning the gold medal in the men's high jump at the 2007 Summer Universiade in Bangkok, Thailand. On 29 July at the 2010 European Athletics Championships in Barcelona, Spain (that was held at the Estadi Olímpic Lluís Companys) he achieved his personal best (2.33 metres) and won gold medal.

In 2020, Shustov was issued with a four competition ban due a backdated from 2013 to 2017 to a doping violation. All of his results from 8 July 2013 onwards were disqualified.

== 2011 Competitions ==
Shustov began the 2011 indoor season by winning the Lukashevich Memorial in Cheliabinsk on 9 January, with a first attempt clearance of 2.27: two others also cleared 2.27, but they required two attempts. At the end of the month, he won the opening leg of the 7th annual Moravia High Jump Tour in the Czech Republic at Třinec on 26 January. He and fellow Russian Sergey Mudrov both cleared 2.29 m, with Shustov awarded the win based on his one miss at his first try at the winning height, while Mudrov needed all three attempts to clear 2.29. At the second stop on the Tour at Hustopece, Russians swept the top four places, with Shustov's 2.30 placing third, to Aleksei Dmitrik's 2.32, and Ivan Ukhov's world-leading 2.38. At the Moscow High Jump Cup on 3 February, Shustov finished tied for second at 2.27, behind Ukhov's winning 2.30.

== Doping ==
On 5 June 2020, Shustov was banned from athletics for four years for anti-doping violations despite retiring from the sport in 2017. His results from 8 July 2013 to 7 July 2017 were disqualified, including his 7th-place finish at the 2013 world championships in his home country. The Athletics Integrity Unit later confirmed that it was the first time that evidence from scratches and marks on urine sample bottles, as stated in the McLaren Report, was accepted as evidence.

== International competitions ==
Year	Competition	Venue	Position	Notes
2005	European U23 Championships	Erfurt, Germany	12th	2.15 m
2007	Universiade	Bangkok, Thailand	1st	2.31 m
2009	European Indoor Championships	Turin, Italy	4th	2.29 m
2009	European Team Championships	Leiria, Portugal	3rd	2.31 m
2010	European Team Championships	Bergen, Norway	1st	2.28 m
2010	European Championships	Barcelona, Spain	1st	2.33 m =PB
2011	European Indoor Championships	Paris, France	3rd	2.34 m =PB
2011	World Championships	Daegu, South Korea	8th	2.29 m
2012	Olympic Games	London, United Kingdom	15th (q)	2.26 m
2013	World Championships	Moscow, Russia	DQ	~~2.32 m~~
2015	European Indoor Championships	Prague, Czech Republic	DQ	~~2.28 m~~

== See also ==
- List of doping cases in athletics
