= 2011 World Championships in Athletics – Men's high jump =

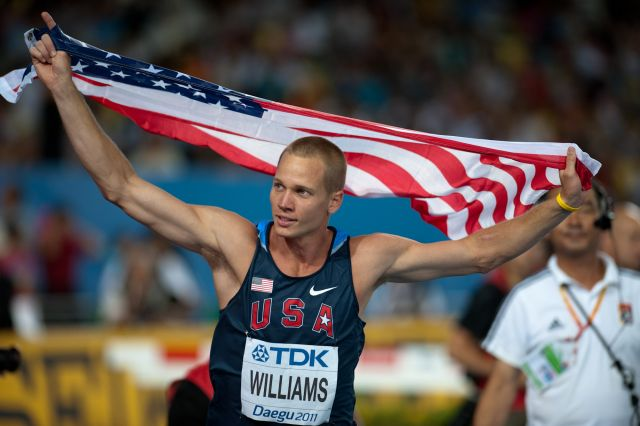
Jesse Williams victory celebration at Daegu

Official Video

The Men's high jump event at the 2011 World Championships in Athletics was held at the Daegu Stadium on August 30 and September 1.

It took a clean round up to 2.28 just to get into the final. In the final, seven competitors cleared 2.32, with only Jesse Williams and Trevor Barry maintaining a clean record. At 2.35, Williams maintained that clean streak, clearing on his first attempt, which ultimately won the gold medal. Only Aleksey Dmitrik was able to match that height, but it was on his second attempt as were all of his last three clearances in the competition.

== Medalists ==
Gold	Silver	Bronze
Jesse Williams; United States	Aleksey Dmitrik; Russia	Trevor Barry; Bahamas

== Records ==
World record	Javier Sotomayor (CUB)	2.45	Salamanca, Spain	27 July 1993
Championship record	Javier Sotomayor (CUB)	2.40	Stuttgart, Germany	22 August 1993
World Leading	Jesse Williams (USA)	2.37	Eugene, United States	26 June 2011
African record	Jacques Freitag (RSA)	2.38	Oudtshoorn, South Africa	5 March 2005
Asian record	Zhu Jianhua (CHN)	2.39	Eberstadt, West Germany	10 June 1984
North, Central American and Caribbean record	Javier Sotomayor (CUB)	2.45	Salamanca, Spain	27 July 1993
South American record	Gilmar Mayo (COL)	2.33	Pereira, Colombia	17 October 1994
European record	Patrik Sjöberg (SWE)	2.42	Stockholm, Sweden	30 June 1987
Oceanian record	Tim Forsyth (AUS)	2.36	Melbourne, Australia	2 March 1997

== Qualification standards ==
A standard	B standard
2.31	2.28

== Schedule ==
Date	Time	Round
August 30, 2011	10:10	Qualification
September 1, 2011	19:10	Final

== Results ==
=== Qualification ===
Qualification: Qualifying Performance 2.31 (Q) or at least 12 best performers (q) advance to the final.

Rank	Group	Name	Nationality	2.16	2.21	2.25	2.28	2.31	Result	Notes
1	B	Dimitrios Chondrokoukis	Greece	o	o	o	o	o	2.31	Q
2	A	Darvin Edwards	Saint Lucia	o	o	xo	o	o	2.31	Q, NR
2	B	Mutaz Essa Barshim	Qatar	o	o	o	xo	o	2.31	Q
4	B	Ivan Ukhov	Russia	o	o	xo	xo	o	2.31	Q
5	A	Jesse Williams	United States	–	o	o	o	xo	2.31	Q
6	B	Aleksandr Shustov	Russia	o	o	xo	o	xo	2.31	Q
7	A	Donald Thomas	Bahamas	xo	o	xxo	o	xo	2.31	Q
8	A	Jaroslav Bába	Czech Republic	–	o	o	o	xxo	2.31	Q
9	B	Zhang Guowei	China	o	o	o	xo	xxo	2.31	Q, PB
10	A	Dmytro Dem'yanyuk	Ukraine	o	xo	o	xo	xxo	2.31	Q
11	A	Aleksey Dmitrik	Russia	o	o	o	o	xxx	2.28	q
11	B	Trevor Barry	Bahamas	o	o	o	o	xxx	2.28	q
11	B	Raúl Spank	Germany	–	o	o	o	xxx	2.28	q
14	A	Erik Kynard	United States	o	o	xo	o	xxx	2.28	
15	A	Eike Onnen	Germany	o	o	xo	xo	xxx	2.28	
15	A	Konstadinos Baniotis	Greece	o	xo	o	xo	xxx	2.28	
15	A	Bohdan Bondarenko	Ukraine	o	o	xo	xo	xxx	2.28	
18	B	Viktor Ninov	Bulgaria	o	xo	xo	xo	xxx	2.28	
19	A	Tom Parsons	Great Britain & N.I.	o	xo	xo	xxx		2.25	
20	A	Raivydas Stanys	Lithuania	o	o	xxo	xxx		2.25	
21	A	Rožle Prezelj	Slovenia	o	xo	xxo	xxx		2.25	
22	B	Silvano Chesani	Italy	xo	xxo	xxo	xxx		2.25	
23	A	Majdeddin Ghazal	Syria	o	o	xxx			2.21	
23	B	Diego Ferrín	Ecuador	o	o	xxx			2.21	
25	B	Kabelo Kgosiemang	Botswana	xxo	o	xxx			2.21	
26	A	Edgar Rivera	Mexico	o	xo	xxx			2.21	
27	B	Andriy Protsenko	Ukraine	xo	xo	xxx			2.21	
28	A	Víctor Moya	Cuba	o	xxo	xxx			2.21	
29	B	Martyn Bernard	Great Britain & N.I.	xxo	xxo	xxx			2.21	
30	B	Dusty Jonas	United States	o	xxx				2.16	
31	B	Osku Torro	Finland	xxo	xxx				2.16	
31	B	Dmitry Kroyter	Israel	xxo	xxx				2.16	
	A	Yun Ye-hwan	South Korea	xxx					NM	
	B	Kyriakos Ioannou	Cyprus						DNS	

=== Final ===
Rank	Name	Nationality	2.20	2.25	2.29	2.32	2.35	2.37	Result	Notes
1st place, gold medalist(s)	Jesse Williams	United States	o	o	o	o	o	xxx	2.35	
2nd place, silver medalist(s)	Aleksey Dmitrik	Russia	o	o	xo	xo	xo	xxx	2.35	
3rd place, bronze medalist(s)	Trevor Barry	Bahamas	o	o	–	o	xxx		2.32	PB
4	Jaroslav Bába	Czech Republic	o	o	xxo	o	xxx		2.32	
5	Dimitrios Chondrokoukis	Greece	o	o	o	xxo	xxx		2.32	PB
5	Ivan Ukhov	Russia	o	o	o	xxo	xxx		2.32	
7	Mutaz Essa Barshim	Qatar	o	xo	xo	xxo	xxx		2.32	
8	Aleksandr Shustov	Russia	o	xo	o	xxx			2.29	
9	Raúl Spank	Germany	o	o	xo	xxx			2.29	
10	Zhang Guowei	China	xo	o	xxx				2.25	
11	Donald Thomas	Bahamas	o	xxx					2.20	
12	Darvin Edwards	Saint Lucia	xo	xxx					2.20	
12	Dmytro Dem'yanyuk	Ukraine	xo	xxx					2.20	
