= Trevor Barry =

Bahamian high jumper (born 1983)

Personal information
- Born: 14 June 1983 (age 43)

Sport
- Country: Bahamas
- Sport: Athletics
- Event: High jump

Achievements and titles
- Personal best: 2.32 m
Medal record
World Championships
Bronze medal – third place	2011 Daegu	High jump
Commonwealth Games
Silver medal – second place	2010 Delhi	High jump
CAC Games
Silver medal – second place	2006 Cartagena de Indias	High Jump
Silver medal – second place	2010 Mayaguez	High Jump
CAC Championships
Gold medal – first place	2011 Mayaguez	High Jump
Silver medal – second place	2008 Cali	High Jump
CARIFTA Games Junior (U20)
Silver medal – second place	2001 Bridgetown	High jump
- Updated on 15 August 2012

Trevor George Barry (born 14 June 1983) is a high jumper from the Bahamas whose personal best was 2.32 metres, achieved in the final of the 2011 World Championships in Athletics in Daegu, South Korea, on 1 September 2011.

Barry competed in college for Dickinson State University where he helped lead his team to three consecutive national championships.

At the 2006 Central American and Caribbean Games, Barry won the silver medal in high jump and finished sixth in the long jump.

== Competition record ==
Year	Competition	Venue	Position	Event	Notes
Representing the Bahamas
2001	CARIFTA Games (U20)	Bridgetown, Barbados	2nd	High jump	2.08 m
2002	Central American and Caribbean Junior Championships (U20)	Bridgetown, Barbados	9th	High jump	1.95 m
2004	NACAC U-23 Championships	Sherbrooke, Canada	4th	High jump	2.10m
2005	Central American and Caribbean Championships	Nassau, Bahamas	4th	High jump	2.20 m
2006	Central American and Caribbean Games	Cartagena, Colombia	2nd	High jump	2.16 m
2006	Central American and Caribbean Games	Cartagena, Colombia	6th	Long jump	7.59 m
2007	Pan American Games	Rio de Janeiro, Brazil	7th	High jump	2.21 m
2008	Central American and Caribbean Championships	Cali, Colombia	2nd	High jump	2.25 m
2009	Central American and Caribbean Championships	Havana, Cuba	4th	High jump	2.13 m
2009	World Championships	Berlin, Germany	17th (q)	High jump	2.24 m
2010	Central American and Caribbean Games	Mayagüez, Puerto Rico	2nd	High jump	2.28 m
2010	Commonwealth Games	Delhi, India	2nd	High jump	2.29 m
2011	Central American and Caribbean Championships	Mayagüez, Puerto Rico	1st	High jump	2.28 m
2011	World Championships	Daegu, South Korea	3rd	High jump	2.32 m
2012	World Indoor Championships	Istanbul, Turkey	7th	High jump	2.31 m
2012	Olympic Games	London, United Kingdom	16th (q)	High jump	2.31 m
2015	NACAC Championships	San José, Costa Rica	2nd	High jump	2.20 m
2015	World Championships	Beijing, China	10th	High jump	2.25 m
2016	Olympic Games	Rio de Janeiro, Brazil	11th	High jump	2.25 m
