= Athletics at the 2006 Asian Games – Men's high jump =

Men's high jump at the 2006 Asian Games
- Venue: Khalifa International Stadium
- Date: 9 December 2006
- Competitors: 15 from 12 nations

Medalists
gold medal	Jean-Claude Rabbath	Lebanon
silver medal	Sergey Zasimovich	Kazakhstan
bronze medal	Naoyuki Daigo	Japan

The men's high jump competition at the 2006 Asian Games in Doha, Qatar was held on 9 December 2006 at the Khalifa International Stadium.

== Schedule ==
All times are Arabia Standard Time (UTC+03:00)

Date	Time	Event
Saturday, 9 December 2006	16:00	Final

== Records ==
Prior to this competition, the existing world, Asian and Games records were as follows.

World Record	Javier Sotomayor (CUB)	2.45	Salamanca, Spain	27 July 1993
Asian Record	Zhu Jianhua (CHN)	2.39	Eberstadt, West Germany	10 June 1984
Games Record	Zhu Jianhua (CHN)	2.33	New Delhi, India	1 December 1982

== Results ==
Rank	Athlete	Attempt							Result	Notes
Rank	Athlete	2.00	2.05	2.10	2.15	2.19	2.23	2.27	Result	Notes
1st place, gold medalist(s)	Jean-Claude Rabbath (LIB)	–	–	–	O	XO	O	XXX	2.23	
2nd place, silver medalist(s)	Sergey Zasimovich (KAZ)	–	O	O	O	XXO	O	XXX	2.23	
3rd place, bronze medalist(s)	Naoyuki Daigo (JPN)	–	–	O	XO	XXO	XXO	XXX	2.23	
4	Hari Shankar Roy (IND)	–	O	O	O	O	XXX		2.19	
5	Salem Nasser Bakheet (BRN)	–	O	XO	XXO	O	XXX		2.19	
6	Hikaru Tsuchiya (JPN)	–	–	O	O	XXO	XXX		2.19	
7	Manjula Kumara (SRI)	–	–	–	XO	XX–	X		2.15	
8	Salem Al-Anezi (KUW)	–	O	XO	XO	XXX			2.15	
9	Lee Hup Wei (MAS)	–	O	XXO	XXO	XXX			2.15	
10	Hashem Al-Oqaibi (KSA)	O	O	O	XXX				2.10	
10	Nguyễn Duy Bằng (VIE)	–	–	O	XXX				2.10	
12	Rashid Al-Mannai (QAT)	XO	O	O	XXX				2.10	
12	Jamel Fakhari (KSA)	–	XO	O	XXX				2.10	
14	Nalin Priyantha (SRI)	–	–	XO	XXX				2.10	
15	Huang Haiqiang (CHN)	–	O	XXX					2.05	
