= 2011 World Youth Championships in Athletics – Boys' high jump =

Boys' high jump at the 2011 World Youth Championships in Athletics
- Venue: Stadium Lille Métropole
- Dates: 7 July (qualification); 9 July (final)
- Competitors: 18
- Winning height: 2.13 PB

Medalists
gold medal	Gaël Lévecque	France
silver medal	Usman Usmanov	Russia
bronze medal	Justin Fondren	United States

The boys' high jump at the 2011 World Youth Championships in Athletics was held at the Stadium Lille Métropole on 7 and 9 July.

== Medalists ==
Gold	Silver	Bronze
Gaël Lévecque; France	Usman Usmanov; Russia	Justin Fondren; United States

== Records ==
Prior to the competition, the following records were as follows.

World Youth Best	Javier Sotomayor (CUB)	2.33	Havana, Cuba	19 May 1984
Championship Record	Huang Haiqiang (CHN)	2.27	Marrakesh, Morocco	16 July 2005
World Youth Leading	Gaël Rotardier (FRA)	2.20	Franconville, France	8 May 2011
World Youth Leading	Gaël Rotardier (FRA)	2.20	Bondoufle, France	22 May 2011

== Qualification ==
Qualification rule: qualification standard 2.08 m or at least best 12 qualified.

=== Group A ===
Rank	Name	Nationality	1.90	1.95	2.00	2.03	2.06	2.08	Result	Notes
1	Gaël Rotardier	France	–	–	o	o			2.03	q
1	Yun Seung-hyun	South Korea	–	o	o	o			2.03	q
1	Muamer Aissa Barsham	Qatar	o	o	o	o			2.03	q
4	Usman Usmanov	Russia	o	o	xo	o			2.03	q
4	David Snowdon	Australia	o	xo	o	o			2.03	q
6	Aviram Shwarzbard	Israel	o	o	o	xxo			2.03	q, PB
7	Yuriy Dergachev	Kazakhstan	o	o	o	xxx			2.00	
8	Brandon Prinsloo	South Africa	–	o	xxx				1.95	
	Eugenio Meloni	Italy	xxx						NM	

=== Group B ===
Rank	Name	Nationality	1.90	1.95	2.00	2.03	2.06	2.08	Result	Notes
1	Kirill Izyumov	Russia	–	o	o	o			2.03	q
1	Gaël Lévecque	France	–	o	o	o			2.03	q
3	Omar Kasseb	Egypt	xo	o	o	o			2.03	q
4	Justin Fondren	United States	o	o	o	xo			2.03	q
5	Ignacio Vigo	Spain	o	o	o	xxo			2.03	q
5	Akira Koike	Japan	–	o	o	xxo			2.03	q, SB
7	Stanislav Ostanin	Kazakhstan	o	o	o	xxx			2.00	
8	Willem van Schalkwyk	South Africa	o	o	xxx				1.95	
9	Ádám Gerencsér	Hungary	o	xo	xxx				1.95	

== Final ==
Rank	Name	Nationality	1.95	2.00	2.05	2.09	2.13	2.16	Result	Notes
1st place, gold medalist(s)	Gaël Lévecque	France	–	o	o	xo	o	xxx	2.13	PB
2nd place, silver medalist(s)	Usman Usmanov	Russia	o	o	o	xo	xo	xxx	2.13	PB
3rd place, bronze medalist(s)	Justin Fondren	United States	–	o	o	xo	xxo	xxx	2.13	
4	Yun Seung-hyun	South Korea	o	o	xo	o	xxx		2.09	
5	Akira Koike	Japan	o	o	o	xo	xxx		2.09	SB
6	David Snowdon	Australia	o	xo	o	xo	xxx		2.09	
7	Gaël Rotardier	France	–	–	o	xxx			2.05	
7	Kirill Izyumov	Russia	o	o	o	xxx			2.05	
9	Ignacio Vigo	Spain	xo	o	xxo	xxx			2.05	
10	Muamer Aissa Barsham	Qatar	o	o	xxx				2.00	
10	Aviram Shwarzbard	Israel	o	o	xxx				2.00	
12	Omar Kasseb	Egypt	xo	o	xxx				2.00	
