= Zhang Guowei (high jumper) =

Chinese high jumper (born 1991)

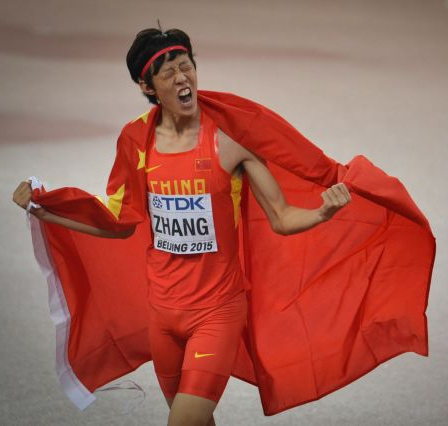
- Zhang Guowei at the 2015 World Championships

Personal information
- Born: June 4, 1991 (age 35) Yantai, China
- Height: 2.00 m (6 ft 6 1/2 in)
- Weight: 77 kg (170 lb)

Sport
- Country: China
- Sport: Athletics
- Event: High jump
Medal record
Men's athletics
Representing China
World Championships
Silver medal – second place	2015 Beijing	High jump
Asian Indoor Championships
Silver medal – second place	2012 Hangzhou	High jump
Bronze medal – third place	2014 Hangzhou	High jump

Zhang Guowei (Chinese: 张国伟; born June 4, 1991) is a Chinese high jumper. He holds the Chinese indoor record of 2.33 metres, and has jumped 2.38 metres outdoors. He was the 2015 World Championship silver medallist and the silver medallist at the 2012 Asian Indoor Athletics Championships. He has been a finalist at the World Championships in Athletics and the IAAF World Indoor Championships and represented China at the 2012 Summer Olympics and 2016 Summer Olympics.

== Career ==
Born in Penglai, Zhang began to train in the high jump at the age of 15.

His first season of international competition came in 2010 and with his best jump of the year (2.23 metres) he took the silver medal at the 2010 Asian Junior Athletics Championships, finishing behind Mutaz Essa Barshim. He was runner-up to Huang Haiqiang at the Chinese Athletics Championships that year. He was undefeated on the Asian Athletics Grand Prix circuit in 2011 and placed eighth at the Asian Championships. He was selected for the 2011 World Championships in Athletics, where he cleared a personal best 2.31 m in the qualifying and went on to finish tenth in the final. A jump of 2.28 m at the national championships gained him his first Chinese high jump title.

At the 2012 Asian Indoor Athletics Championships Zhang repeated his regional placing behind former junior rival Barshim and was the silver medallist. His good form continued at the 2012 IAAF World Indoor Championships as he finished joint fourth with a Chinese record-equalling mark of 2.31 m (tying with former world record holder Zhu Jianhua). He was selected to represent China at the 2012 London Olympics but did not progress to the final. He defended his national title in September by equalling his personal best mark.

Zhang overhauled Zhu's 26-year-old Chinese indoor record in March 2013, clearing 2.32 m to become the outright record holder. Zhang narrowly failed to equal Zhu's national record of 2.39 m when he came second at 2.38 m behind Mutaz Essa Barshim (winner at 2.41 m) in the Eugene Oregon IAAF Diamond Meet on 30 May 2015. The 2015 World Championships were held in Beijing, and there Zhang achieved his best World Championship result, second place with a jump of 2.33 m. This was the first World Championship high jump medal China had won since Zhu Jianhua's medal in 1983.

In 2016, he again represented China at the Olympics.

Zhang announced his retirement via social media in April 2020.

== Competition record ==
Year	Competition	Venue	Position	Notes
Representing China
2010	Asian Junior Championships	Hanoi, Vietnam	2nd	2.23 m
2011	Asian Championships	Kobe, Japan	8th	2.15 m
2011	World Championships	Daegu, South Korea	10th	2.25 m
2012	Asian Indoor Championships	Hangzhou, China	2nd	2.28 m
2012	World Indoor Championships	Istanbul, Turkey	4th	2.31 m
2012	Olympic Games	London, United Kingdom	21st (q)	2.21 m
2013	World Championships	Moscow, Russia	9th	2.29 m
2014	Asian Indoor Championships	Hangzhou, China	3rd	2.20 m
2014	World Indoor Championships	Sopot, Poland	7th	2.29 m
2014	Asian Games	Incheon, South Korea	2nd	2.33 m
2015	World Championships	Beijing, China	2nd	2.33 m
2016	World Indoor Championships	Portland, United States	6th	2.29 m
2016	Olympic Games	Rio de Janeiro, Brazil	25th (q)	2.22 m
2017	Asian Championships	Bhubaneswar, India	2nd	2.28 m
2017	World Championships	London, United Kingdom	24th (q)	2.22 m
