= Athletics at the 2010 Commonwealth Games – Men's high jump =

Men's high jump at the Commonwealth Games

The Men's high jump at the 2010 Commonwealth Games as part of the athletics programme was held at the Jawaharlal Nehru Stadium on Thursday 7 and Saturday 9 October 2010.

== Records ==
World Record	2.45	Javier Sotomayor	CUB	Salamanca, Spain	27 July 1993
Games Record	2.36	Clarence Saunders	BER	Auckland, New Zealand	1990

== Results ==
=== Qualifying round ===
Qualification: Qualifying Performance 2.16 (Q) or at least 12 best performers (q) advance to the Final.

Rank	Group	Athlete	1.85	1.90	1.95	2.00	2.05	2.10	2.13	2.16	Result	Notes
1	B	Kabelo Kgosiemang (BOT)	-	-	-	-	-	-	o	o	2.16	Q
1	B	Donald Thomas (BAH)	-	-	-	-	-	-	o	o	2.16	Q
1	B	Michael Mason (CAN)	-	-	-	-	-	o	o	o	2.16	Q
1	A	Samson Oni (ENG)	-	-	-	-	-	o	o	o	2.16	Q
1	B	Tom Parsons (ENG)	-	-	-	o	-	o	o	o	2.16	Q
6	A	Hari Sankar Roy (IND)	-	-	-	o	o	xo	o	o	2.16	Q =SB
6	A	Brendan Williams (DMA)	-	-	-	o	o	xo	o	o	2.16	Q
8	A	Lee Hup Wei (MAS)	-	-	-	-	-	o	o	xo	2.16	Q
8	A	Manjula Kumara Wijesekara (SRI)	-	-	-	-	-	o	-	xo	2.16	Q
8	B	Liam Zamel-Paez (AUS)	-	-	-	-	-	o	-	xo	2.16	Q
8	B	James Grayman (ANT)	-	-	-	-	o	o	-	xo	2.16	Q
12	A	Trevor Barry (BAH)	-	-	-	-	-	xo	xo	xo	2.16	Q
13	A	William Woodcock (SEY)	-	-	-	-	o	xo	o	xxo	2.16	Q
14	B	Nikhil Chittarasu (IND)	-	-	o	o	o	xxo	xo	xxo	2.16	Q SB
15	B	Fernand Djoumessi (CMR)	-	-	-	-	-	o	o	xxx	2.13	PB
16	A	Martyn Bernard (ENG)	-	-	-	x-	o	o	o	xxx	2.13	
17	B	Darrell Garwood (JAM)	-	-	o	-	xo	o	-	xxx	2.10	
18	B	Nalin Priyantha (SRI)	-	-	-	-	xxo	xxo	xxx		2.10	
19	A	Md. Sojib Hossain (BAN)	-	-	o	o	o	xxx			2.05	
20	A	Domanique Missick (TCI)	o	o	o	o	xo	xxx			2.05	
21	B	Kivarno Handfield (TCI)	o	o	xxx						1.90	
22	A	Norman Tse (PNG)	xo	xo	xxx						1.90	
	A	Julien Matongno (CMR)	-	-	-	-	xxx				NM	

=== Final ===
Rank	Athlete	2.00	2.05	2.10	2.15	2.20	2.23	2.26	2.29	2.32	2.36	Result	Notes
1st place, gold medalist(s)	Donald Thomas (BAH)	-	-	o	o	o	o	o	o	o	xxx	2.32	SB
2nd place, silver medalist(s)	Trevor Barry (BAH)	-	-	o	-	o	o	o	o	xxx		2.29	PB
3rd place, bronze medalist(s)	Kabelo Kgosiemang (BOT)	-	-	-	o	o	xo	xo	x-	xx		2.26	=SB
4	Samson Oni (ENG)	-	-	o	o	xo	o	xxx				2.23	
5	Lee Hup Wei (MAS)	-	-	o	o	o	xxo	xxx				2.23	
5	Tom Parsons (ENG)	-	-	o	o	o	xxo	xxx				2.23	
7	Michael Mason (CAN)	-	-	o	o	o	xxx					2.20	
8	William Woodcock (SEY)	-	o	xo	o	xo	xxx					2.20	=PB
9	Manjula Kumara Wijesekara (SRI)	-	-	o	o	xxx						2.15	
9	Liam Zamel-Paez (AUS)	-	-	o	o	xxx						2.15	
11	Hari Sankar Roy (IND)	-	o	xo	o	xxx						2.15	
12	James Grayman (ANT)	-	xo	o	xo	xxx						2.15	
13	Nikhil Chittarasu (IND)	o	o	xxo	xo	xxx						2.15	
14	Brendan Williams (DMA)	-	o	xxo	xxx							2.10	
