= Athletics at the 2014 Asian Games – Men's high jump =

Men's high jump at the 2014 Asian Games
- Venue: Incheon Asiad Main Stadium
- Dates: 29 September 2014
- Competitors: 19 from 12 nations

Medalists
gold medal	Mutaz Barsham	Qatar
silver medal	Zhang Guowei	China
bronze medal	Muamer Barsham	Qatar

The men's high jump event at the 2014 Asian Games was held at the Incheon Asiad Main Stadium, Incheon, South Korea on 29 September.

== Schedule ==
All times are Korea Standard Time (UTC+09:00)

Date	Time	Event
Monday, 29 September 2014	18:30	Final

== Records ==
Prior to this competition, the existing world, Asian and Games records were as follows.

World Record	Javier Sotomayor (CUB)	2.45	Salamanca, Spain	27 July 1993
Asian Record	Mutaz Barsham (QAT)	2.43	Brussels, Belgium	5 September 2014
Games Record	Zhu Jianhua (CHN)	2.33	New Delhi, India	1 December 1982

== Results ==
Legend

- NM — No mark

Rank	Athlete	Attempt								Result	Notes
Rank	Athlete	2.10	2.15	2.20	2.25	2.29	2.33	2.35	2.40	Result	Notes
1st place, gold medalist(s)	Mutaz Barsham (QAT)	–	–	XO	O	O	O	O	XX	2.35	GR
2nd place, silver medalist(s)	Zhang Guowei (CHN)	O	O	XO	XO	O	XXO	XXX		2.33	
3rd place, bronze medalist(s)	Muamer Barsham (QAT)	O	O	O	O	XXX				2.25	
4	Wang Yu (CHN)	O	O	XO	O	XXX				2.25	
5	Naoto Tobe (JPN)	–	–	O	XO	XXX				2.25	
6	Yuriy Dergachev (KAZ)	O	O	O	XXX					2.20	
6	Majdeddin Ghazal (SYR)	O	O	O	XXX					2.20	
6	Mohammad Reza Vazifehdoust (IRI)	O	O	O	XXX					2.20	
6	Yun Seung-hyun (KOR)	O	O	O	XXX					2.20	
10	Woo Sang-hyeok (KOR)	O	XO	O	XXX					2.20	
11	Takashi Eto (JPN)	–	O	XXX						2.15	
12	Manjula Kumara (SRI)	XO	O	XXX						2.15	
13	Nawaf Al-Yami (KSA)	XXO	O	XXX						2.15	
14	Nauraj Singh Randhawa (MAS)	O	XO	XXX						2.15	
14	Vitaliy Tsykunov (KAZ)	O	XO	XXX						2.15	
16	Nikhil Chittarasu (IND)	XO	XXO	XXX						2.15	
17	Hashem Al-Oqaibi (KSA)	XO	XXX							2.10	
—	Keivan Ghanbarzadeh (IRI)	XXX								NM	
—	Hsiang Chun-hsien (TPE)	XXX								NM	
