= 2010 Asian Indoor Athletics Championships – Results =

These are the official results of the 2010 Asian Indoor Athletics Championships which took place on 24–26 February 2010 in Tehran, Iran.

== Men's results ==
=== 60 meters ===
Heats – 24 February

Rank	Heat	Name	Nationality	Time	Notes
1	1	Reza Ghasemi	Iran	6.66	Q
2	1	Samuel Francis	Qatar	6.67	Q
3	2	Barakat Al-Harthi	Oman	6.69	Q
4	1	Lai Chun Ho	Hong Kong	6.77	q
5	2	Vyacheslav Muravyev	Kazakhstan	6.81	Q
6	3	Mohamed Al-Rashedi	Bahrain	6.81	Q
7	2	Zhang Peimeng	China	6.85	q
7	3	Peyman Rajabi	Iran	6.85	Q
9	3	Lu Bin	China	6.87	
10	2	Hossein Ghaemi	Iran	6.89	
11	3	Abdul Najeeb Qureshi	India	6.90	
12	1	Rinat Galiyev	Kazakhstan	6.93	
12	2	Mohamed Farhan	Bahrain	6.93	
12	3	Leung Chun Wai	Hong Kong	6.93	
15	3	Ahmad Rahhal	Syria	6.97	
16	1	Dmitrii Ilin	Kyrgyzstan	7.05	
17	1	Jalal Dilzar	Iraq	7.09	NR
18	2	Igor Khan	Tajikistan	7.17	
19	1	Ildar Hojayev	Turkmenistan	7.19	NR
20	3	Islam Berdiyev	Turkmenistan	7.20	
21	2	Pao Hin Fong	Macau	7.23	
22	3	Shanil Esmail	Maldives	7.27	
23	2	Amer Jasim	Iraq	7.36	
24	1	Hossein Ahosan	Maldives	7.4	

Final – 24 February

Rank	Name	Nationality	Time	Notes
1st place, gold medalist(s)	Samuel Francis	Qatar	6.58	CR
2nd place, silver medalist(s)	Reza Ghasemi	Iran	6.67	
3rd place, bronze medalist(s)	Barakat Al-Harthi	Oman	6.68	
4	Lai Chun Ho	Hong Kong	6.71	
5	Zhang Peimeng	China	6.78	
6	Peyman Rajabi	Iran	6.86	
7	Vyacheslav Muravyev	Kazakhstan	6.86	
8	Mohamed Al-Rashedi	Bahrain	6.87	

=== 400 meters ===
Heats – 25 February

Rank	Heat	Name	Nationality	Time	Notes
1	2	Reza Bouazar	Iran	48.71	Q
2	2	Shahab Aldin Tahmasebi	Iran	48.77	Q
3	1	Bibin Mathew	India	49.16	Q
4	1	Mohsen Zarin Afzal	Iran	49.19	Q
5	2	Sergey Zaikov	Kazakhstan	49.34	q
6	1	Dmitry Korobeinikov	Kazakhstan	49.47	q
7	1	Ahmed Nasser Al-Wahaibi	Oman	50.21	
8	1	Amer Jasim	Iraq	51.2	
9	2	Farkhod Kuralov	Tajikistan	50.4	
10	2	Kareem Kareem	Iraq	50.71	
	1	Shanil Esmail	Maldives	DNS	
	2	Hossein Ahosan	Maldives	DNS	

Final – 26 February

Rank	Name	Nationality	Time	Notes
1st place, gold medalist(s)	Bibin Mathew	India	47.81	CR
2nd place, silver medalist(s)	Reza Bouazar	Iran	48.14	
3rd place, bronze medalist(s)	Shahab Aldin Tahmasebi	Iran	48.15	
4	Dmitry Korobeinikov	Kazakhstan	49.06	
5	Mohsen Zarin Afzal	Iran	49.77	
6	Sergey Zaikov	Kazakhstan	49.80	

=== 800 meters ===
Heats – 24 February

Rank	Heat	Name	Nationality	Time	Notes
1	1	Masato Yokota	Japan	1:52.74	Q
2	1	Mohammad Al-Azemi	Kuwait	1:52.80	Q
3	1	Musaeb Abdulrahman Balla	Qatar	1:53.02	q
4	1	Mehdi Zamani	Iran	1:54.10	q
5	1	Amadi Abudi Karar	Iraq	1:56.36	
6	2	Hamza Driouch	Qatar	1:56.56	Q
7	2	Reza Aryanik	Iran	1:56.92	Q
8	2	Farkhod Kuralov	Tajikistan	1:57.13	
9	2	Ghamanda Ram	India	1:58.02	
10	2	Mohd Jironi Riduan	Malaysia	2:01.13	
	1	Sajjad Moradi	Iran	DNS	
	2	Adnan Agar	Iraq	DNS	

Final – 25 February

Rank	Name	Nationality	Time	Notes
1st place, gold medalist(s)	Mohammad Al-Azemi	Kuwait	1:53.22	
2nd place, silver medalist(s)	Musaeb Abdulrahman Balla	Qatar	1:54.25	
3rd place, bronze medalist(s)	Masato Yokota	Japan	1:54.71	
4	Hamza Driouch	Qatar	1:54.75	
5	Reza Aryanik	Iran	1:55.57	
6	Mehdi Zamani	Iran	1:56.24	

=== 1500 meters ===
26 February

Rank	Name	Nationality	Time	Notes
1st place, gold medalist(s)	Abubaker Ali Kamal	Qatar	3:51.78	
2nd place, silver medalist(s)	Mohammed Al-Garni	Qatar	3:53.12	
3rd place, bronze medalist(s)	Rouhollah Mohammadi	Iran	3:55.64	
4	Qais Salim Al-Mahroqi	Oman	3:55.71	
5	Ali Meghdadi Poor	Iran	3:57.01	
6	Mohammad Saleh Rostami	Iran	3:59.58	
7	Sergey Pakura	Kyrgyzstan	4:05.74	
8	Ajmal Amirov	Tajikistan	4:14.22	
9	Mohd Jironi Riduan	Malaysia	4:16.54	NR

=== 3000 meters ===
24 February

Rank	Name	Nationality	Time	Notes
1st place, gold medalist(s)	James Kwalia	Qatar	7:57.73	
2nd place, silver medalist(s)	Essa Ismail Rashed	Qatar	7:57.77	
3rd place, bronze medalist(s)	Mohammad Khazaei	Iran	8:26.33	
4	Qais Salim Al-Mahroqi	Oman	8:39.00	
5	Mohamad Javad Sayadi	Iran	8:46.41	
6	Hosein Keyhani	Iran	8:53.25	
7	Ridwan	Indonesia	9:03.53	
8	Ajmal Amirov	Tajikistan	9:33.04	
9	Chan Chan Kit	Macau	10:17.73	
	Omar Al-Rasheedi	Kuwait	DNS	

=== 60 meters hurdles ===
Heats – 26 February

Rank	Heat	Name	Nationality	Time	Notes
1	1	Jiang Fan	China	7.75	Q, CR
2	2	Mohamad Goudarzi	Iran	7.96	Q
3	1	Mojtaba Postchi Khorasani	Iran	7.99	Q
4	2	Fawaz Al-Shammari	Kuwait	8.03	Q
5	2	Nazar Mukhametzhan	Kazakhstan	8.04	Q
6	1	Hassan Mohd Robani	Malaysia	8.07	Q
7	1	Denis Semenov	Kazakhstan	8.15	q
8	1	Sandeep Parmar	India	8.16	q
9	1	Ahmad Reza Khanfari	Iran	8.31	
10	2	Altares Bellal	Syria	8.36	
11	2	Ilyas Seisov	Turkmenistan	8.73	

Final – 26 February

Rank	Name	Nationality	Time	Notes
1st place, gold medalist(s)	Jiang Fan	China	7.75	=CR
2nd place, silver medalist(s)	Fawaz Al-Shammari	Kuwait	7.90	
3rd place, bronze medalist(s)	Mohamad Goudarzi	Iran	7.95	
4	Nazar Mukhametzhan	Kazakhstan	7.98	
5	Hassan Mohd Robani	Malaysia	8.06	
6	Sandeep Parmar	India	8.25	
7	Denis Semenov	Kazakhstan	8.31	
	Mojtaba Postchi Khorasani	Iran	DQ	

=== 4 x 400 meters relay ===
26 February

Rank	Nation	Athletes	Time	Notes
1st place, gold medalist(s)	Iran	Shahabeddin Tahmasebi, Reza Bouazar, Mohsen Zarrin-Afzal, Mehdi Zamani	3:15.02	
2nd place, silver medalist(s)	India	Bibin Mathew, Ajay Kumar, Shake Mortaja, V. B. Bineesh	3:16.05	
3rd place, bronze medalist(s)	Kazakhstan	Dmitriy Korabelnikov, Sergey Zaikov, Vyacheslav Muravyev, Nazar Mukhametzhan	3:17.06	NR

=== High jump ===
25 February

Rank	Name	Nationality	Result	Notes
1st place, gold medalist(s)	Mutaz Essa Barshim	Qatar	2.20	
2nd place, silver medalist(s)	Keivan Ghanbarzadeh	Iran	2.17	
3rd place, bronze medalist(s)	Jean-Claude Rabbath	Lebanon	2.17	
4	Rashid Ahmed Al-Mannai	Qatar	2.17	
5	Hikaru Tsuchiya	Japan	2.17	
6	Sergey Zasimovich	Kazakhstan	2.14	
6	Hari Shankar Roy	India	2.14	
6	Zhao Kuansong	China	2.14	
9	Esfandiar Ayati	Iran	2.11	
10	Vitaliy Tsykunov	Kazakhstan	2.11	
11	Amin Hossein Zadeh Rahbar	Iran	2.11	
12	Sayed Ali Al-Awi	United Arab Emirates	2.08	
13	Lee Hup Wei	Malaysia	2.05	
	Faraj Madid	Kuwait	NM	
	Lei Kuok Kuan	Macau	NM	
	Majed Aldin Ghazal	Syria	DNS	

=== Pole vault ===
26 February

Rank	Name	Nationality	Result	Notes
1st place, gold medalist(s)	Mohsen Rabbani	Iran	5.20	
2nd place, silver medalist(s)	Nikita Filippov	Kazakhstan	5.10	
3rd place, bronze medalist(s)	Eshagh Ghaffari	Iran	4.90	
4	Bader Hashim Al-Jabor	Qatar	4.40	
4	Mohamad Bayati	Iran	4.40	
	Fahad Al-Mershad	Kuwait	DNS	

=== Long jump ===
24 February

Rank	Name	Nationality	Result	Notes
1st place, gold medalist(s)	Rikiya Saruyama	Japan	7.65	
2nd place, silver medalist(s)	Zhuang Haitao	China	7.58	
3rd place, bronze medalist(s)	Mohammad Ibrar	India	7.56	
4	Roozbeh Asadibakhsh	Iran	7.53	
5	Joebert Delicano	Philippines	7.28	
6	Yevgeniy Chettykbayev	Kazakhstan	7.19	
7	Dmitrii Ilin	Kyrgyzstan	7.18	
8	Behroz Sistanipoor	Iran	7.14	

=== Triple jump ===
26 February

Rank	Name	Nationality	Result	Notes
1st place, gold medalist(s)	Dong Bin	China	16.73	CR
2nd place, silver medalist(s)	Nobuaki Fujibayashi	Japan	16.33	
3rd place, bronze medalist(s)	Roman Valiyev	Kazakhstan	16.25	
4	Jia Yingli	China	16.04	
5	Yevgeniy Chettykbayev	Kazakhstan	16.04	
6	Vahid Sedigh	Iran	15.60	
7	Ali Reza Habibigalankashi	Iran	15.44	
8	Mostafa Ataee	Iran	14.09	
9	Abdullah Al-Youha	Kuwait	13.86	

=== Shot put ===
25 February

Rank	Name	Nationality	Result	Notes
1st place, gold medalist(s)	Satyendra Kumar Singh	India	19.17	CR
2nd place, silver medalist(s)	Mashari Mohammad	Kuwait	18.78	
3rd place, bronze medalist(s)	Hamid Reza Farahani	Iran	18.58	
4	Ali Reza Mehrsafooti	Iran	17.38	
5	Sourabh Vij	India	17.22	
6	Adi Aliffudin Hussin	Malaysia	16.67	NR
7	Tejen Homadov	Turkmenistan	15.38	
	Sed Mehdi Shahrokhi	Iran	NM	

=== Heptathlon ===
The highest mark recorded in each event is highlighted in yellow

Rank	Athlete	Nationality	60m	LJ	SP	HJ	60m H	PV	1000m	Points	Notes
1st place, gold medalist(s)	Hadi Sepehrzad	Iran	6.97	6.75	15.82	1.92	8.28	3.90	3:09.99	5292	
2nd place, silver medalist(s)	Abdoljalil Tomaj	Iran	7.08	7.13	12.00	1.95	8.97	3.80	2:59.14	5054	
3rd place, bronze medalist(s)	Pulimoottil Joseph Vinod	India	7.22	6.66	13.34	1.83	8.77	4.10	3:00.61	4981	
4	Ali Hazer	Lebanon	7.16	6.43	11.59	1.83	8.45	3.40	2:52.32	4813	
5	Saeed Kolivand	Iran	7.40	6.38	12.00	1.83	9.00	3.50	2:50.32	4664	
	Arnold Vilarube	Philippines	7.17	–	10.85	–	–	–	–	DNF	
	Vu Van Huyen	Vietnam	7.19	6.33	–	–	–	–	–	DNF	

== Women's results ==
=== 60 meters ===
Heats – 24 February

Rank	Heat	Name	Nationality	Time	Notes
1	2	Han Ling	China	7.58	Q
2	1	Jiang Lan	China	7.61	Q
3	2	Olga Bludova	Kazakhstan	7.63	Q
4	1	Chan Ho Yee	Hong Kong	7.66	Q
5	2	Maryam Tousi	Iran	7.74	Q
6	2	Sodabe Sobhany	Iran	7.75	q
7	1	Gretta Taslakian	Lebanon	7.77	Q
8	1	Nafise Mataei	Iran	7.78	q
9	1	Dana Hussein Abdul-Razzaq	Iraq	7.85	
10	1	Yelena Ryabova	Turkmenistan	7.87	
11	2	Lam Kaim	Macau	8.31	
12	1	Buthaina Al-Yaqoubi	Oman	8.38	
13	2	Yusra Khamis Al-Shoukri	Oman	8.90	

Final – 24 February

Rank	Name	Nationality	Time	Notes
1st place, gold medalist(s)	Jiang Lan	China	7.51	
2nd place, silver medalist(s)	Han Ling	China	7.55	
3rd place, bronze medalist(s)	Olga Bludova	Kazakhstan	7.57	
4	Chan Ho Yee	Hong Kong	7.65	
5	Maryam Tousi	Iran	7.71	
6	Sodabe Sobhany	Iran	7.73	
7	Nafise Mataei	Iran	7.75	
8	Gretta Taslakian	Lebanon	DNS	

=== 400 meters ===
Heats – 25 February

Rank	Heat	Name	Nationality	Time	Notes
1	1	Marina Maslyonko	Kazakhstan	55.75	Q
2	2	Yelena Dombrovskaya	Kazakhstan	56.01	Q
3	1	Priyanka Pawar	India	56.22	q
4	2	Jauna Murmu	India	56.60	Q
5	1	Maryam Tousi	Iran	58.28	q
6	1	Leong Ka Man	Macau	59.80	
7	1	Solmaz Azimian	Iran	59.81	
8	2	Dana Hussein Abdul-Razzaq	Iraq	1:02.06	
9	2	Yusra Khamis Al-Shoukri	Oman	1:10.03	
	2	Sodabe Sobhany	Iran	DQ	
	2	Munira Saleh	Syria	DQ	Doping
	1	Ieso Gulustan	Iraq	DNS	

Final – 26 February

Rank	Name	Nationality	Time	Notes
1st place, gold medalist(s)	Marina Maslyonko	Kazakhstan	53.89	
2nd place, silver medalist(s)	Jauna Murmu	India	54.56	
3rd place, bronze medalist(s)	Yelena Dombrovskaya	Kazakhstan	55.47	
4	Priyanka Pawar	India	56.18	
5	Maryam Tousi	Iran	56.39	
	Munira Saleh	Syria	DQ	Doping

=== 800 meters ===
25 February

Rank	Name	Nationality	Time	Notes
1st place, gold medalist(s)	Truong Thanh Hang	Vietnam	2:12.75	
2nd place, silver medalist(s)	Tatiana Borisova	Kyrgyzstan	2:14.60	
3rd place, bronze medalist(s)	Mina Porseyfi	Iran	2:15.87	
4	Bita Haji	Iran	2:18.20	
5	Fahemeh Kalhoor	Iran	2:24.11	
6	Gulustan Ieso	Iraq	2:31.61	
	Alaa Jasim	Iraq	DNS	

=== 1500 meters ===
26 February

Rank	Name	Nationality	Time	Notes
1st place, gold medalist(s)	Viktoriia Poliudina	Kyrgyzstan	4:29.65	
2nd place, silver medalist(s)	Tatiana Borisova	Kyrgyzstan	4:32.06	
3rd place, bronze medalist(s)	Leila Ebrahimi	Iran	4:36.26	
4	Truong Thanh Hang	Vietnam	4:39.29	
5	Zahra Ali Akbary	Iran	4:54.54	
6	Mahboubeh Ghayour	Iran	4:57.37	
	Oksana Verner	Kazakhstan	DQ	Doping

=== 3000 meters ===
24 February

Rank	Name	Nationality	Time	Notes
1st place, gold medalist(s)	Viktoriia Poliudina	Kyrgyzstan	9:39.35	
2nd place, silver medalist(s)	Leila Ebrahimi	Iran	10.05.42	
3rd place, bronze medalist(s)	Mahboubeh Ghayour	Iran	10.29.31	
4	Fatemeh Jafary	Iran	11:35.75	
	Oksana Verner	Kazakhstan	DQ	Doping

=== 60 meters hurdles ===
25 February

Rank	Name	Nationality	Time	Notes
1st place, gold medalist(s)	Wong Wing Sum	Hong Kong	8.79	
2nd place, silver medalist(s)	Somayyeh Mehrban	Iran	9.41	
3rd place, bronze medalist(s)	Elnaz Kompani	Iran	9.49	
4	Suliman Bahar	Iraq	9.55	
5	Farzane Mashayeky	Iran	9.73	
	Hiba Omar	Syria	DNS	

=== 4 x 400 meters relay ===
26 February

Rank	Nation	Athletes	Time	Notes
1st place, gold medalist(s)	India	Priyanka Pawar, Jauna Murmu, Ashwini Akkunji, Karnatapu Sowjanya	3:43.83	
2nd place, silver medalist(s)	Kazakhstan	Yelena Dombrovskaya, Marina Maslyonko, Olga Bludova, ?	3:44.20	
3rd place, bronze medalist(s)	Iran	Mina Pourseifi, Maryam Tousi, Soulmaz Azimian, Soudabeh Sobhani	4:00.03	

=== High jump ===
24 February

Rank	Name	Nationality	Result	Notes
1st place, gold medalist(s)	Marina Aitova	Kazakhstan	1.93	=CR
2nd place, silver medalist(s)	Anna Ustinova	Kazakhstan	1.86	
3rd place, bronze medalist(s)	Qiao Yanrui	China	1.83	
4	Duong Thi Viet Anh	Vietnam	1.83	
5	Yuki Mimura	Japan	1.80	
6	Sepideh Tavakoly	Iran	1.75	
7	Zahra Nabi Zade	Iran	1.65	
	Mahsa Karegar	Iran	DNS	

=== Pole vault ===
25 February

Rank	Name	Nationality	Result	Notes
1st place, gold medalist(s)	Roslinda Samsu	Malaysia	4.00	
2nd place, silver medalist(s)	Tatyana Turkova	Kazakhstan	3.70	

=== Long jump ===
25 February

Rank	Name	Nationality	Result	Notes
1st place, gold medalist(s)	Lyudmila Grankovskaya	Kazakhstan	5.98	
2nd place, silver medalist(s)	Chen Yaling	China	5.95	
3rd place, bronze medalist(s)	Reshmi Bose	India	5.93	
4	M. A. Prajusha	India	5.92	
5	Tatyana Konichsheva	Kazakhstan	5.79	
6	Cheung Lai Yee	Hong Kong	5.69	
7	Tse Mang Chi	Hong Kong	5.49	
8	Vahide Kordloo	Iran	5.06	

=== Triple jump ===
26 February

Rank	Name	Nationality	Result	Notes
1st place, gold medalist(s)	Liu Yanan	China	13.66	
2nd place, silver medalist(s)	Lyudmila Grankovskaya	Kazakhstan	12.95	
3rd place, bronze medalist(s)	Tatyana Konichsheva	Kazakhstan	12.82	
4	Sayuri Takeda	Japan	12.55	
5	M. A. Prajusha	India	12.43	
6	Tse Mang Chi	Hong Kong	12.31	
7	Cheung Lai Yee	Hong Kong	11.85	
8	Reshmi Bose	India	11.72	
9	Mahsa Motamedy	Iran	11.48	

=== Shot put ===
24 February

Rank	Name	Nationality	Result	Notes
1st place, gold medalist(s)	Leila Rajabi	Iran	17.32	NR
2nd place, silver medalist(s)	Meng Qianqian	China	17.03	
3rd place, bronze medalist(s)	Ma Qiao	China	16.97	
4	Alexandra Fisher	Kazakhstan	14.77	
5	Mahrokh Moradi	Iran	12.21	
6	Hiba Omar	Syria	11.86	
7	Maryam Norouzi	Iran	11.83	

=== Pentathlon ===
The highest mark recorded in each event is highlighted in yellow

Rank	Athlete	Nationality	60m H	HJ	SP	LJ	800m	Points	Notes
1st place, gold medalist(s)	Zahra Nabizadeh	Iran	10.47	1.75	7.04	4.76	3:05.61	2691	
2nd place, silver medalist(s)	Bahar Khasrou	Iraq	9.68	1.36	8.07	4.66	2:40.61	2682	
3rd place, bronze medalist(s)	Farzaneh Mashayekhi	Iran	9.83	1.39	7.53	4.30	2:42.24	2541	
4	Zahra Asadizadeh	Iran	10.89	1.54	6.84	4.48	2:45.60	2479	
5	Alaa Jasim	Iraq	–	1.33	9.27	4.77	2:25.90	2164	
