= Athletics at the 2009 Summer Universiade – Men's high jump =

The men's high jump event at the 2009 Summer Universiade was held on 7–9 July.

== Medalists ==
Gold	Silver	Bronze
Eduard Malchenko; Russia	Michael Mason; Canada	Ivan Ilichev; Russia

== Results ==
=== Qualification ===
Qualification: 2.23 m (Q) or at least 12 best (q) qualified for the final.

Rank	Group	Athlete	Nationality	1.90	2.00	2.10	2.15	2.20	Result	Notes
1	A	Nerijus Bužas	Lithuania	–	o	o	o	o	2.20	q
1	A	Michal Kabelka	Slovakia	–	o	o	o	o	2.20	q
1	B	Eduard Malchenko	Russia	–	–	o	o	o	2.20	q
1	B	Jussi Viita	Finland	–	o	o	o	o	2.20	q
5	A	Hiromi Takahari	Japan	–	–	o	xo	o	2.20	q
6	B	Andrea Lemmi	Italy	–	o	o	xxo	o	2.20	q
7	A	Liam Zamel-Paez	Australia	–	o	o	o	xo	2.20	q
8	B	Marco Fassinotti	Italy	–	o	xxo	o	xo	2.20	q
9	A	Ivan Ilichev	Russia	–	–	o	o	xxx	2.15	q
9	A	Jovan Vukićević	Serbia	–	–	o	o	xxx	2.15	q
9	B	Michael Mason	Canada	–	–	o	o	xxx	2.15	q
12	B	Antonis Mastoras	Greece	–	o	xo	o	xxx	2.15	q
13	A	Sergey Zasimovich	Kazakhstan	–	–	o	xo	xxx	2.15	
14	B	Miloš Todosijević	Serbia	–	o	o	xxo	xxx	2.15	
15	A	Amine Kessai	Algeria	–	o	xxo	xxx		2.10	
16	A	Lui Tsz Hin Daniel	Hong Kong	o	o	xxx			2.00	
16	B	Rober Martínez	Colombia	–	o	xxx			2.00	
16	B	Vitaliy Tsykunov	Kazakhstan	–	o	xxx			2.00	
19	A	Salomon Tauire	Namibia	–	xo	xxx			2.00	
20	B	Armin Bukva	Bosnia and Herzegovina	–	xo	xxx			2.00	
	A	Lebopo Malambane	Botswana	–	–	–	xxx		NM	
	A	Mark Dillon	Canada	–	–	xxx			NM	
	A	Mwewa Chekwe	Zambia	xxx					NM	
	B	David Edou Okot	Uganda	–	xxx				NM	
	A	Adesanya Adetayo	Nigeria						DNS	
	B	Jean-Paul Masanga Mekombo	Democratic Republic of the Congo						DNS	
	B	Mauro Silva	Brazil						DNS	

=== Final ===
Rank	Athlete	Nationality	2.00	2.10	2.15	2.20	2.23	2.25	Result	Notes
1st place, gold medalist(s)	Eduard Malchenko	Russia	–	o	o	xo	xxo	xxx	2.23	
2nd place, silver medalist(s)	Michael Mason	Canada	–	o	xo	xxo	xxo	xxx	2.23	
3rd place, bronze medalist(s)	Ivan Ilichev	Russia	–	o	o	o	xxx		2.20	
4	Marco Fassinotti	Italy	o	o	o	xo	xxx		2.20	
5	Hiromi Takahari	Japan	–	o	o	xxo	xxx		2.20	
5	Liam Zamel-Paez	Australia	–	o	o	xxo	xxx		2.20	
7	Nerijus Bužas	Lithuania	o	xo	o	xxx			2.15	
7	Michal Kabelka	Slovakia	o	xo	o	xxx			2.15	
7	Andrea Lemmi	Italy	o	xo	o	xxx			2.15	
10	Jovan Vukićević	Serbia	–	o	xxo	xxx			2.15	
11	Jussi Viita	Finland	–	o	xxx				2.10	
12	Antonis Mastoras	Greece	o	xxx					2.00	
