= Rashid Al-Mannai =

Qatari track and field athlete

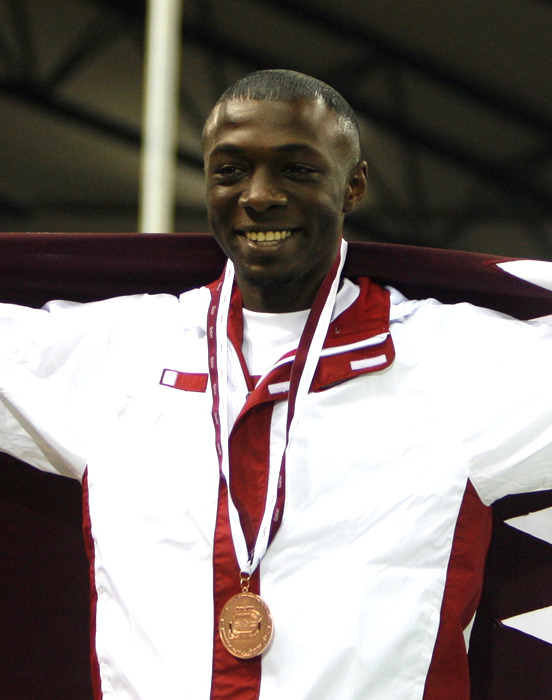
- Rashid Al-Mannai in 2008

Personal information
- Born: 18 June 1988 (age 38) Doha, Qatar
- Height: 1.83 m (6 ft 0 in)
- Weight: 72 kg (159 lb) (2014)

Sport
- Sport: Athletics
- Events: High jump, triple jump

Achievements and titles
- Personal best: HJ – 2.28 m (2010)
Medal record
Men's athletics
Representing Qatar
IAAF Continental Cup
Gold medal – first place	2010 Split	High jump
Asian Indoor Games
Gold medal – first place	2007 Macau	High jump
Asian Indoor Championships
Bronze medal – third place	2008 Doha	High jump
Bronze medal – third place	2016 Doha	Triple jump
Pan Arab Games
Silver medal – second place	2007 Cairo	High jump

Rashid Ahmed Al-Mannai (Arabic: أحمد راشد المناعي; born 18 June 1988) is a Qatari track and field athlete who specialises in the high jump and triple jump.

== Biography ==
Born in Doha, he started competing internationally in 2005 and finished eleventh at the 2005 World Youth Championships in Athletics and set a personal best of 2.10 metres for 14th at the 2005 Asian Athletics Championships. He competed at the 2006 World Junior Championships in Athletics in Beijing the following year, but did not get past the qualification round. He finished twelfth at the 2006 Asian Games later that year, jumping 2.10 metres.

He enjoyed his first regional successes in 2007 – he set a Qatari record of 2.24 metres to take the gold medal at the 2007 Asian Indoor Games (a mark which was also a Games record). He represented Qatar at the 2007 Pan Arab Games in November and won a silver medal behind Salem Al-Anezi, with a jump of 2.17 m. A few months later, he returned to action with an appearance at the 2008 Asian Indoor Athletics Championships in his hometown. The high jump gold went to Sergey Zasimovich but Al-Mannai still reached the podium, taking the bronze medal.

He set an outdoor national record in Doha in April 2008, clearing 2.20 m for the win and an outdoor best. After a year out from competition, Al-Mannai returned by setting a personal best of 2.27 m in Malmö, which earned him an appearance at the 2010 IAAF Continental Cup. Representing the Asia-Pacific team, he cleared both 2.21 m and 2.25 m on his second attempts, but he cleared the bar first time at 2.28 m – a new personal best and closer to Mutaz Essa Barshim's new Qatari record. It was a surprise win over 2007 World Champion Donald Thomas and marked the first high jump medal and victory by an Asian at the competition.

== Competition record ==
Year	Competition	Venue	Position	Event	Notes
Representing Qatar
2005	World Youth Championships	Marrakesh, Morocco	11th	High jump	2.08 m
2005	Asian Championships	Incheon, South Korea	14th	High jump	2.10 m
2005	West Asian Games	Doha, Qatar	5th	High jump	2.10 m
2006	World Junior Championships	Beijing, China	17th (q)	High jump	2.10 m
2006	Asian Games	Doha, Qatar	12th	High jump	2.10 m
2007	Arab Championships	Amman, Jordan	8th	High jump	2.11 m
2007	Asian Championships	Amman, Jordan	15th	High jump	2.10 m
2007	Asian Indoor Games	Macau, China	1st	High jump	2.24 m
2007	Pan Arab Games	Cairo, Egypt	2nd	High jump	2.17 m
2008	Asian Indoor Championships	Doha, Qatar	3rd	High jump	2.18 m
2010	Asian Indoor Championships	Tehran, Iran	4th	High jump	2.17 m
2010	West Asian Championships	Aleppo, Syria	1st	High jump	2.25 m
2010	Asian Games	Guangzhou, China	3rd	High jump	2.19 m
2011	Asian Championships	Seville, Spain	8th	High jump	2.10 m
2011	Pan Arab Games	Doha, Qatar	3rd	High jump	2.21 m
2013	Arab Championships	Doha, Qatar	2nd	Triple jump	16.40 m
2013	Asian Championships	Pune, India	5th	Triple jump	15.98 m
2013	Jeux de la Francophonie	Nice, France	6th	Triple jump	16.30 m
2014	Asian Games	Incheon, South Korea	–	Triple jump	NM
2015	Arab Championships	Isa Town, Bahrain	2nd	Triple jump	15.97 m (w)
2015	Asian Championships	Wuhan, China	7th	Triple jump	16.06 m
2015	Military World Games	Mungyeong, South Korea	4th	Triple jump	16.27 m
2016	Asian Indoor Championships	Doha, Qatar	3rd	Triple jump	15.97 m
2017	Islamic Solidarity Games	Baku, Azerbaijan	10th	Triple jump	15.31 m
2017	Arab Championships	Radès, Tunisia	4th	Triple jump	15.85 m
2017	Asian Indoor and Martial Arts Games	Ashgabat, Turkmenistan	3rd	Triple jump	15.99 m
2018	Asian Games	Jakarta, Indonesia	11th	Triple jump	15.92 m
