= 2004 World Junior Championships in Athletics – Men's high jump =

The men's high jump event at the 2004 World Junior Championships in Athletics was held in Grosseto, Italy, at Stadio Olimpico Carlo Zecchini on 13 and 15 July.

== Medalists ==
Gold	Michael Mason; Canada
Silver	Marius Hanniske; Germany
Bronze	Hu Tong; China

== Results ==
=== Final ===
15 July

Rank	Name	Nationality	Result	Notes
1st place, gold medalist(s)	Michael Mason	Canada	2.21	
2nd place, silver medalist(s)	Marius Hanniske	Germany	2.21	
3rd place, bronze medalist(s)	Hu Tong	China	2.21	
4	Linus Thörnblad	Sweden	2.21	
5	Ramsay Carelse	South Africa	2.21	
6	Bogdan Popa	Romania	2.18	
7	Jussi Tasala	Finland	2.18	
8	Hikaru Tsuchiya	Japan	2.18	
9	Nick Stanisavljevic	United Kingdom	2.14	
10	Matthias Haverney	Germany	2.14	
11	Liu Yang	China	2.10	
12	Anton Gorjatsihh	Estonia	2.10	

=== Qualifications ===
13 July

==== Group A ====
Rank	Name	Nationality	Result	Notes
1	Marius Hanniske	Germany	2.15	q
1	Ramsay Carelse	South Africa	2.15	q
1	Linus Thörnblad	Sweden	2.15	q
4	Hikaru Tsuchiya	Japan	2.15	q
5	Jussi Tasala	Finland	2.15	q
6	Liu Yang	China	2.10	q
7	Ivan Ukhov	Russia	2.10	
8	Michael Diaz	France	2.10	
9	Kyryl Shymansky	Ukraine	2.10	
10	Alberto Bedin	Italy	2.10	
11	Norris Frederick	United States	2.05	
12	Kim Yeong-min	South Korea	2.00	

==== Group B ====
Rank	Name	Nationality	Result	Notes
1	Hu Tong	China	2.15	q
2	Nick Stanisavljevic	United Kingdom	2.15	q
2	Bogdan Popa	Romania	2.15	q
4	Michael Mason	Canada	2.15	q
5	Anton Gorjatsihh	Estonia	2.10	q
6	Matthias Haverney	Germany	2.10	q
7	Emilios Xenofontos	Cyprus	2.10	
8	Theódoros Mathioudákis	Greece	2.10	
9	Philipp Britner	Russia	2.05	
10	Robert Szabó	Hungary	2.05	
11	Redžep Selman	Macedonia	2.05	
12	Matt Carter	United States	1.95	

== Participation ==
According to an unofficial count, 24 athletes from 20 countries participated in the event.

- Canada (1)
- China (2)
- Cyprus (1)
- Estonia (1)
- Finland (1)
- France (1)
- Germany (2)
- Greece (1)
- Hungary (1)
- Italy (1)
- Japan (1)
- Macedonia (1)
- Romania (1)
- Russia (2)
- South Africa (1)
- South Korea (1)
- Sweden (1)
- Ukraine (1)
- United Kingdom (1)
- United States (2)
