= Malchenko =

Malchenko is a surname. Notable people with the surname include:

- Eduard Malchenko (born 1986), Russian high jumper
- Sergey Malchenko (born 1968), Russian high jumper
