= 2007 Asian Athletics Championships – Men's high jump =

The men's high jump event at the 2007 Asian Athletics Championships was held in Amman, Jordan on July 25.

== Results ==
Rank	Name	Nationality	Result	Notes
1st place, gold medalist(s)	Lee Hup Wei	Malaysia	2.24	
2nd place, silver medalist(s)	Jean-Claude Rabbath	Lebanon	2.21	
3rd place, bronze medalist(s)	Satoru Kubota	Japan	2.21	
4	Hasney Iqeeij	Saudi Arabia	2.21	
5	Hari Sankar Roy	India	2.18	
6	Tsao Chih-Hao	Chinese Taipei	2.18	
7	Kim Jong-pyo	South Korea	2.18	
8	Nguyen Duy Bang	Vietnam	2.14	
8	Salem Al-Anezi	Kuwait	2.14	
10	Zhao Kuansong	China	2.14	
11	Jamal Fakhri Al-Qasim	Saudi Arabia	2.10	
11	Vitaliy Tsykunov	Kazakhstan	2.10	
11	Salem Nasser Bakheet	Bahrain	2.10	
14	Majed Aldin Ghazal	Syria	2.10	
15	Rashid Ahmed Al-Mannai	Qatar	2.10	
16	Choi Hong Fai	Macau	1.90	
