= 2017 Asian Athletics Championships – Men's high jump =

The men's high jump at the 2017 Asian Athletics Championships was held on 6 and 8 July.

== Medalists ==
Gold	Woo Sang-hyeok; South Korea
Silver	Zhang Guowei; China
Bronze	Majed Aldin Gazal; Syria

== Results ==
=== Qualification ===
Rank	Name	Nationality	1.95	2.00	2.04	2.08	2.10	Result	Notes
	Hiromi Takahari	Japan	–	–	o	–	o	2.10	Q
	Zhang Guowei	China						2.10	Q
	Hsiang Chun-hsien	Chinese Taipei						2.10	Q
	B. Chethan	India	–	–	o	–	o	2.10	Q
	Ajay Kumar	India						2.10	Q
	Daisuke Nakajima	Japan				–		2.10	Q
	Majed Aldin Gazal	Syria	–	–	–	–	o	2.10	Q
	Roman Loshkarev	Kazakhstan						2.10	Q
	Woo Sang-hyeok	South Korea	–	–	o	o	o	2.10	Q
	Lee Hup Wei	Malaysia						2.10	Q
	Mahamat Alamine Hamdi	Qatar	–	–	o	o	o	2.10	Q
	Manjula Kumara	Sri Lanka						2.10	Q
	Keivan Ghanbarzadeh	Iran						2.10	Q
	Bai Long	China	–	–	o	xo	o	2.10	Q
15	Abdalrahman Al-Youha	Kuwait	o	o	xxx			2.00	
16	Mahfuzur Rahman	Bangladesh	xxo	xo	xxx			2.00	

=== Final ===
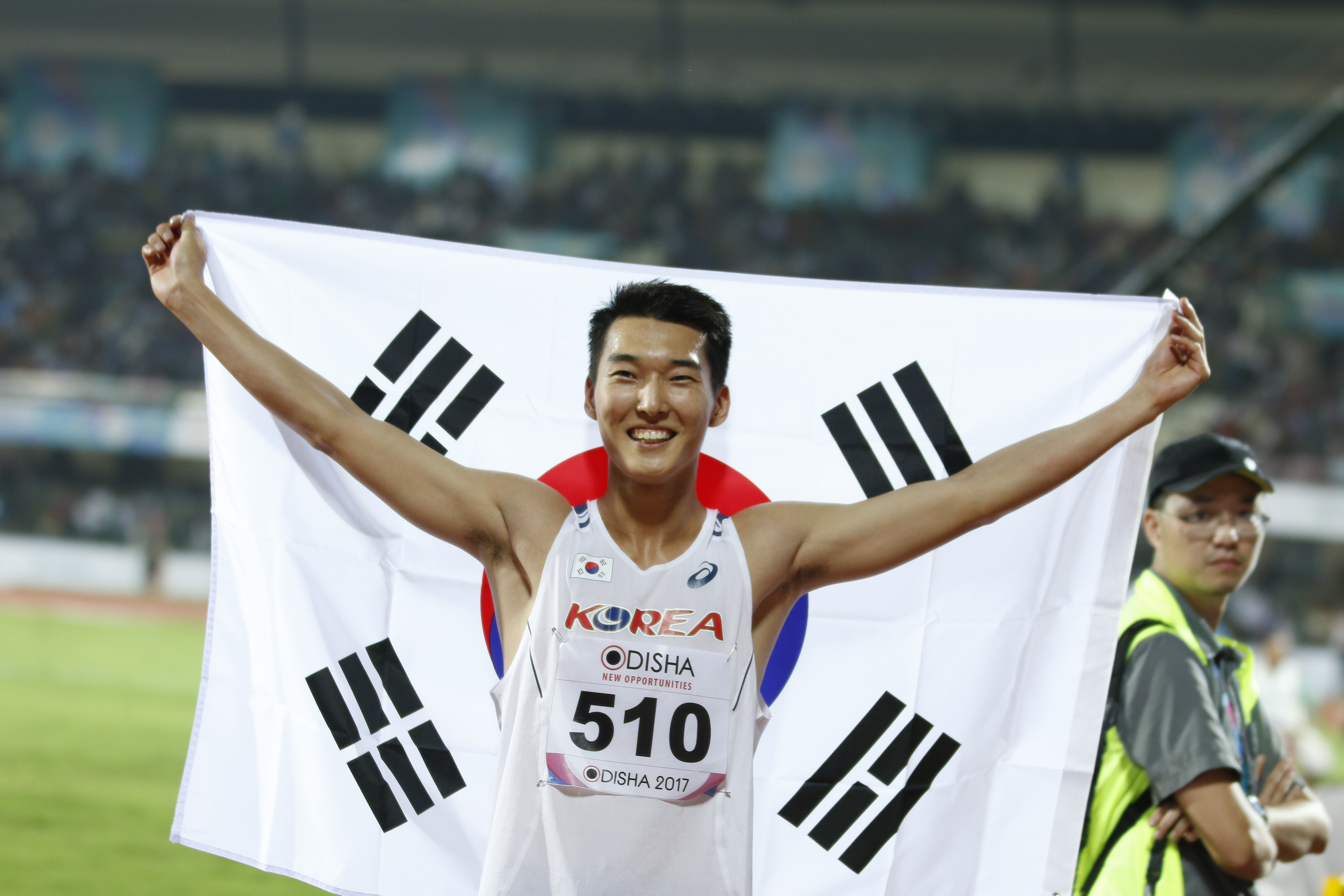
The winner, Woo Sang-hyeok

Rank	Name	Nationality	2.05	2.10	2.15	2.20	2.24	2.28	2.30	2.32	Result	Notes
1st place, gold medalist(s)	Woo Sang-hyeok	South Korea	–	o	o	o	xo	xxo	xxo	xxx	2.30	=PB
2nd place, silver medalist(s)	Zhang Guowei	China	–	o	o	o	o	xo	xxx		2.28	
3rd place, bronze medalist(s)	Majed Aldin Gazal	Syria	–	o	o	o	o	xxx			2.24	
4	Mahamat Alamine Hamdi	Qatar	o	o	o	o	xxx				2.20	
5	B. Chethan	India	o	xo	xo	o	xxx				2.20	
6	Manjula Kumara	Sri Lanka	–	o	o	xo	xxx				2.20	
6	Lee Hup Wei	Malaysia	–	o	o	xo	xxx				2.20	
6	Keivan Ghanbarzadeh	Iran	–	o	o	xo	xxx				2.20	
6	Hsiang Chun-hsien	Chinese Taipei	–	o	o	xo	xxx				2.20	
10	Bai Long	China	o	o	o	xxx					2.15	
11	Ajay Kumar	India	o	o	xo	xxx					2.15	
12	Hiromi Takahari	Japan	–	o	xxx						2.10	
13	Daisuke Nakajima	Japan	o	xxo	xxx						2.10	
14	Roman Loshkarev	Kazakhstan	xxo	xxx							2.05	
