= 2009 Asian Athletics Championships – Men's high jump =

The men's high jump event at the 2009 Asian Athletics Championships was held at the Guangdong Olympic Stadium on November 13.

== Results ==
Rank	Athlete	Nationality	1.95	2.00	2.05	2.10	2.15	2.20	2.23	2.26	Result	Notes
1st place, gold medalist(s)	Manjula Kumara Wijesekara	Sri Lanka	–	–	–	o	o	o	o	xxx	2.23	
2nd place, silver medalist(s)	Huang Haiqiang	China	–	–	o	o	o	xo	o	xxx	2.23	
3rd place, bronze medalist(s)	Vitaliy Tsykunov	Kazakhstan	–	o	o	o	xxo	o	xxx		2.20	
4	Keyvan Ghanbarzadeh	Iran	–	o	xo	xo	o	xxx			2.15	
5	Lee Hup Wei	Malaysia	–	–	o	o	xo	xxx			2.15	
6	Naoyuki Daigo	Japan	–	–	–	o	xxo	xxx			2.15	
7	Hiromi Takahari	Japan	–	–	o	xo	xxo	xxx			2.15	
8	Majed Aldin Ghazal	Syria	–	–	o	o	xxx				2.10	
9	Sergey Zasimovich	Kazakhstan	–	–	xo	o	xxx				2.10	
10	Lui Tsz Hin Daniel	Hong Kong	xxo	o	xo	o	xxx				2.10	
11	Hari Shankar Roy	India	–	xo	o	xo	xxx				2.10	
12	Chen Cheng	China	o	o	o	xxx					2.05	
12	Lee Sung	South Korea	–	–	o	xxx					2.05	
14	Mohammad Sojib Hossain	Bangladesh	o	xo	xxo	xxx					2.05	PB
15	Salem Naser Salem	Bahrain	–	o	xxx						2.00	
15	Tsao Chih-hao	Chinese Taipei	–	o	xxx						2.00	
17	Sergey Timshin	Uzbekistan	o	xxo	xxx						2.00	
