= Bi Xiaoliang =

Chinese high jumper (born 1992)

Medal record

Men's athletics

Representing China

Asian Athletics Championships
Gold medal – first place	2013 Pune	High jump

Bi Xiaoliang (Chinese: 毕晓亮; born 26 December 1992) is a Chinese track and field athlete who competes in the high jump. His personal best for the event is 2.24 m (7 ft 4 in).

Born in Shandong, Bi began taking part in athletics as a teenager and began to compete at national leve in 2010. He participated at the Chinese Athletics Championships that year and made the final round the next season, placing 15th overall. He came eighth at the Chinese junior championships and the Chinese City Games in 2011. In 2012 he improved his best to 2.24 m (7 ft 4 in) and came twelfth at the national event.

Bi had his breakthrough year in 2013. He cleared 2.20 m (7 ft 2 1/2 in) at three successive meetings on the Chinese Athletics Grand Prix circuit and came sixth at the Chinese Championships. In the absence of defending champion Mutaz Essa Barshim and in poor weather conditions, he won the gold medal at the 2013 Asian Athletics Championships by virtue of a jump-off. This earned him a place at the 2013 World Championships in Athletics, but he failed to register a valid mark.
