= 2015 Asian Athletics Championships – Men's high jump =

The men's high jump event at the 2015 Asian Athletics Championships was held on June 7.

== Results ==
Rank	Name	Nationality	2.00	2.05	2.10	2.15	2.20	2.24	2.28	Result	Notes
1st place, gold medalist(s)	Takashi Eto	Japan	–	–	o	o	xo	o	xxx	2.24	
2nd place, silver medalist(s)	Hsiang Chun-Hsien	Chinese Taipei	–	–	o	o	xxo	o	xxx	2.24	
3rd place, bronze medalist(s)	Mutaz Essa Barshim	Qatar	–	–	o	o	o	xxx		2.20	
4	Hiromi Takahari	Japan	–	–	o	–	xo	xxx		2.20	
5	Keivan Ghanbarzadeh	Iran	–	–	o	xo	xo	xxx		2.20	
6	Manjula Kumara	Sri Lanka	–	–	o	o	xxo	x–		2.20	
7	Wang Yu	China	–	o	o	xo	xxx			2.15	
8	Majd Eddin Ghazal	Syria	–	o	o	xxx				2.10	
8	Yu Shisuo	China	o	o	o	xxx				2.10	
10	Woo Sang-hyeok	South Korea	o	xo	o	xxx				2.10	
11	Muamer Aissa Barsham	Qatar	o	o	xo	xxx				2.10	
11	Nawaf Ahmed Al-Yami	Saudi Arabia	o	o	xo	xxx				2.10	
13	Lee Hup Wei	Malaysia	o	o	xxx					2.05	
13	Yeung Hong To	Hong Kong	o	o	xxx					2.05	
15	Lui Tsz Hin	Hong Kong	o	xo	xxx					2.05	
