= Athletics at the 2010 Asian Games – Men's high jump =

Men's high jump at the 2010 Asian Games
- Venue: Aoti Main Stadium
- Dates: 21–23 November 2010
- Competitors: 18 from 14 nations

Medalists
gold medal	Mutaz Barsham	Qatar
silver medal	Hiromi Takahari	Japan
bronze medal	Rashid Al-Mannai	Qatar
bronze medal	Huang Haiqiang	China
bronze medal	Vitaliy Tsykunov	Kazakhstan

The men's high jump event at the 2010 Asian Games was held at the Aoti Main Stadium, Guangzhou, China on 21–23 November.

== Schedule ==
All times are China Standard Time (UTC+08:00)

Date	Time	Event
Sunday, 21 November 2010	09:00	Qualifying
Tuesday, 23 November 2010	17:00	Final

== Records ==
Prior to this competition, the existing world, Asian and Games records were as follows.

World Record	Javier Sotomayor (CUB)	2.45	Salamanca, Spain	27 July 1993
Asian Record	Zhu Jianhua (CHN)	2.39	Eberstadt, West Germany	10 June 1984
Games Record	Zhu Jianhua (CHN)	2.33	New Delhi, India	1 December 1982

== Results ==
=== Qualifying ===
- Qualification: Qualifying performance 2.20 (Q) or at least 12 best performers (q) advance to the final.

Rank	Group	Athlete	Attempt					Result	Notes
Rank	Group	Athlete	1.95	2.00	2.05	2.10	2.15	Result	Notes
1	A	Rashid Al-Mannai (QAT)	–	–	–	O	O	2.15	q
1	A	Huang Haiqiang (CHN)	–	–	O	O	O	2.15	q
1	A	Vitaliy Tsykunov (KAZ)	–	–	O	O	O	2.15	q
4	A	Keivan Ghanbarzadeh (IRI)	–	XO	O	O	O	2.15	q
4	B	Mutaz Barsham (QAT)	–	–	–	XO	O	2.15	q
6	A	Hiromi Takahari (JPN)	–	–	O	O	XO	2.15	q
6	A	Manjula Kumara (SRI)	–	–	–	O	XO	2.15	q
8	B	Hashem Al-Oqaibi (KSA)	–	–	–	XO	XO	2.15	q
9	A	Jean-Claude Rabbath (LIB)	–	–	–	O	XXO	2.15	q
9	B	Lee Hup Wei (MAS)	–	–	O	O	XXO	2.15	q
11	B	Hari Shankar Roy (IND)	–	O	O	O	XXX	2.10	q
12	B	Daniel Lui (HKG)	O	XO	O	O	XXX	2.10	q
13	A	Nikhil Chittarasu (IND)	O	O	O	XO	XXX	2.10	
13	B	Majdeddin Ghazal (SYR)	–	–	O	XO	XXX	2.10	
15	A	Hsiang Chun-hsien (TPE)	O	O	O	XXX		2.05	
16	B	Salem Nasser Bakheet (BRN)	–	XO	XO	XXX		2.05	
17	B	Sergey Zasimovich (KAZ)	–	–	XXO	XXX		2.05	
18	B	Nalin Priyantha (SRI)	–	XO	XXX			2.00	

=== Final ===
Rank	Athlete	Attempt										Result	Notes
Rank	Athlete	1.90	1.95	2.00	2.05	2.10	2.15	2.19	2.23	2.27	2.32	Result	Notes
1st place, gold medalist(s)	Mutaz Barsham (QAT)	–	–	–	–	O	O	O	O	O	X	2.27	
2nd place, silver medalist(s)	Hiromi Takahari (JPN)	–	–	–	–	O	O	O	XO	XXX		2.23	
3rd place, bronze medalist(s)	Rashid Al-Mannai (QAT)	–	–	–	–	O	O	O	XXX			2.19	
3rd place, bronze medalist(s)	Huang Haiqiang (CHN)	–	–	–	O	O	O	O	XXX			2.19	
3rd place, bronze medalist(s)	Vitaliy Tsykunov (KAZ)	–	–	–	O	O	O	O	XXX			2.19	
6	Manjula Kumara (SRI)	–	–	–	–	O	O	XO	XXX			2.19	
7	Hashem Al-Oqaibi (KSA)	–	–	–	O	O	XXO	XO	XXX			2.19	
8	Keivan Ghanbarzadeh (IRI)	–	–	–	O	O	XXO	XXO	XXX			2.19	
9	Lee Hup Wei (MAS)	–	–	–	–	XO	O	X–	XX			2.15	
10	Daniel Lui (HKG)	–	–	O	O	O	XXX					2.10	
11	Jean-Claude Rabbath (LIB)	–	–	–	–	XO	XXX					2.10	
12	Hari Shankar Roy (IND)	–	–	O	O	XXO	XXX					2.10	
