= 2002 World Junior Championships in Athletics – Men's high jump =

The men's high jump event at the 2002 World Junior Championships in Athletics was held in Kingston, Jamaica, at National Stadium on 17 and 18 July.

== Medalists ==
Gold	Andra Manson; United States
Silver	Zhu Wannan; China
Bronze	Germaine Mason; Jamaica

== Results ==
=== Final ===
18 July

Rank	Name	Nationality	Result	Notes
1st place, gold medalist(s)	Andra Manson	United States	2.31	
2nd place, silver medalist(s)	Zhu Wannan	China	2.23	
3rd place, bronze medalist(s)	Germaine Mason	Jamaica	2.21	
4	Pavel Chetvertakov	Russia	2.21	
4	Jesse Williams	United States	2.21	
6	Sergey Ivanov	Belarus	2.18	
6	Aleksandr Plisko	Belarus	2.18	
8	Jaroslav Bába	Czech Republic	2.18	
9	Manjula Kumara	Sri Lanka	2.14	
10	Martyn Bernard	United Kingdom	2.14	
11	Thomas Bipella	Sweden	2.10	
12	Peter Horák	Slovakia	2.10	
13	Michał Bieniek	Poland	2.05	
14	Aleksey Dmitrik	Russia	2.05	

=== Qualifications ===
17 Jul

==== Group A ====
Rank	Name	Nationality	Result	Notes
1	Manjula Kumara	Sri Lanka	2.18	Q
2	Michał Bieniek	Poland	2.18	Q
2	Peter Horák	Slovakia	2.18	Q
4	Jaroslav Bába	Czech Republic	2.18	Q
5	Jesse Williams	United States	2.18	Q
6	Zhu Wannan	China	2.18	Q
7	Thomas Bipella	Sweden	2.18	Q
8	Aleksandr Plisko	Belarus	2.18	Q
9	Pavel Chetvertakov	Russia	2.18	Q
10	Mickaël Hanany	France	2.15	
11	Kyriakos Ioannou	Cyprus	2.12	
12	Kim Jong-Pyo	South Korea	2.12	
13	Mark Crowley	United Kingdom	2.12	
14	Andrea Lemmi	Italy	2.12	
15	Tim Riedel	Germany	2.12	
16	Artyom Kozbanov	Ukraine	2.12	
17	Olutola Fakehinde	Jamaica	2.04	
18	Panayiótis Filippopoulos	Greece	2.04	
	Michael Reiher	Kiribati	NH	

==== Group B ====
Rank	Name	Nationality	Result	Notes
1	Sergey Ivanov	Belarus	2.18	Q
1	Germaine Mason	Jamaica	2.18	Q
1	Andra Manson	United States	2.18	Q
4	Martyn Bernard	United Kingdom	2.18	Q
5	Aleksey Dmitrik	Russia	2.18	Q
6	Stanislav Sajdok	Czech Republic	2.15	
7	Linus Thörnblad	Sweden	2.15	
8	Park Jun-Hwan	South Korea	2.12	
8	Wojciech Sibiga	Poland	2.12	
10	Hervé Paris	France	2.12	
11	James Watson	Australia	2.12	
12	Mark Dillon	Canada	2.12	
13	Stefan Häfner	Germany	2.08	
14	Davorin Sluga	Slovenia	2.08	
15	Damon Thompson	Barbados	2.08	
15	Rainer Piirimets	Estonia	2.08	
17	Yu Inoue	Japan	2.00	
18	Marios Iacovou	Cyprus	2.00	

== Participation ==
According to an unofficial count, 37 athletes from 25 countries participated in the event.

- Australia (1)
- Barbados (1)
- Belarus (2)
- Canada (1)
- China (1)
- Cyprus (2)
- Czech Republic (2)
- Estonia (1)
- France (2)
- Germany (2)
- Greece (1)
- Italy (1)
- Jamaica (2)
- Japan (1)
- Kiribati (1)
- Poland (2)
- Russia (2)
- Slovakia (1)
- Slovenia (1)
- South Korea (2)
- Sri Lanka (1)
- Sweden (2)
- Ukraine (1)
- United Kingdom (2)
- United States (2)
