= Jithin Thomas =

Indian high jumper (born 1990)

- Born: 1 June 1990 (age 36)

Jithin C. Thomas (born 1 June 1990) is an Indian high jumper.

He won the silver medal at the 2013 Asian Championships.

His personal best is 2.22 metres, achieved in September 2012 in Chennai.
