= Nalin Priyantha =

Sri Lankan high jumper (born 1981)

Nalin Priyantha Akwattha Dawage (born 22 April 1981) is a retired Sri Lankan high jumper.

He finished fifth at the 2005 Asian Championships, fourteenth at the 2006 Asian Games, won the bronze medals at the 2006 South Asian Games and the 2010 South Asian Games.

He also no-heighted in the final at the 2002 Asian Championships and competed at the 2010 Commonwealth Games and the 2010 Asian Games without reaching the final.

His personal best is 2.15 metres, achieved at the 2005 Asian Championships in September 2005 in Incheon.
