= Hiromi Takahari =

Japanese high jumper

Personal information
- Nationality: Japanese
- Born: 13 November 1987 (age 38) Yokosuka, Japan
- Education: Tokai University
- Height: 1.82 m (6 ft 0 in)
- Weight: 66 kg (146 lb)

Sport
- Country: Japan
- Sport: Track and field
- Event: High jump
- Retired: November 2020

Achievements and titles
- Personal best: Outdoor: 2.28 m (2015) Indoor: 2.26 m (2016)
Medal record
Men's athletics
Representing Japan
Asian Games
Silver medal – second place	2010 Guangzhou	High jump

Hiromi Takahari (髙張 広海, Takahari Hiromi; born 13 November 1987 in Yokosuka) is a Japanese retired high jumper.

He finished seventh at the 2009 Asian Championships, fifth at the 2009 Summer Universiade, won the silver medal the 2010 Asian Games and finished fourth at the 2013 Asian Championships.

His personal best is 2.28 metres, achieved in May 2015 in Kawasaki.

He retired in November 2020.

== Personal bests ==
Event	Height	Competition	Venue	Date
Outdoor	2.28 m	Golden Grand Prix	Kawasaki, Japan	10 May 2015
Indoor	2.26 m		Prague, Czech Republic	7 February 2016

== International competition ==
Year	Competition	Venue	Position	Event	Height
Representing Japan
2009	Universiade	Belgrade, Serbia	5th	High jump	2.20 m
2009	Asian Championships	Guangzhou, China	7th	High jump	2.15 m
2010	Asian Games	Guangzhou, China	2nd	High jump	2.23 m
2013	Asian Championships	Pune, India	4th	High jump	2.21 m
2015	Asian Championships	Wuhan, China	4th	High jump	2.20 m
2017	Asian Championships	Bhubaneswar, India	12th	High jump	2.10 m

== National titles ==
- Japanese Championships
  - High jump: 2010, 2012, 2013
