= Manjula Kumara =

Sri Lankan high jumper

Personal information
- Full name: Manjula Kumara Wijesekera
- Born: 30 January 1984 (age 42) Morawaka, Sri Lanka

Sport
- Country: Sri Lanka
- Sport: High jump
Medal record
Men's athletics
Representing Sri Lanka
Asian Championships
Gold medal – first place	2005 Incheon	High jump
Asian Indoor Championships
Bronze medal – third place	2016 Doha	High jump

Manjula Kumara Pathiranage Wijesekara (born 30 January 1984 in Morawaka) is a Sri Lankan high jumper. He has been regarded as one of the most experienced high jumpers to have represented the country mainly in the Asian Games and Commonwealth Games after making his senior debut in 2001. Manjula Kumara represented Sri Lanka at the 2004 Summer Olympics, which was also his only Olympic appearance in his prolific career.

Kumara was an All-American jumper for the USC Trojans track and field team, finishing runner-up in the high jump at the 2010 NCAA Division I Outdoor Track and Field Championships.

His personal best is 2.27 metres, first achieved in July 2004 in Colombo, became a Sri Lankan record till 2020.

Kumara is a two-time Asian outdoor champion and three-time South Asian Games champion.

Manjula Kumara has also qualified to play in the 2018 Commonwealth Games and will represent Sri Lanka at the 2018 Commonwealth Games, which is also his last Commonwealth Games event in his career.

== Competition record ==
Year	Competition	Venue	Position	Notes
Representing Sri Lanka
2001	World Youth Championships	Debrecen, Hungary	8th	2.10 m
2002	World Junior Championships	Kingston, Jamaica	9th	2.14 m
2002	Asian Championships	Colombo, Sri Lanka	5th	2.15 m
2002	Asian Games	Busan, South Korea	8th	2.10 m
2002	Asian Junior Championships	Bangkok, Thailand	5th	2.15 m
2003	Asian Championships	Manila, Philippines	11th	2.10 m
2004	South Asian Games	Islamabad, Pakistan	1st	2.20 m (NR)
2004	Olympic Games	Athens, Greece	20th (q)	2.20 m
2005	World Championships	Helsinki, Finland	23rd (q)	2.15 m
2005	Asian Championships	Incheon, South Korea	1st	2.27 m (NR)
2006	South Asian Games	Colombo, Sri Lanka	1st	2.19 m
2006	Asian Games	Doha, Qatar	7th	2.15 m
2009	Asian Championships	Guangzhou, China	1st	2.23 m
2010	Commonwealth Games	Delhi, India	9th	2.15 m
2010	Asian Games	Guangzhou, China	6th	2.19 m
2013	Asian Championships	Pune, India	8th	2.18 m
2014	Asian Games	Incheon, South Korea	12th	2.15 m
2015	Asian Championships	Wuhan, China	6th	2.20 m
2016	South Asian Games	Guwahati, India	1st	2.17 m
2016	Asian Indoor Championships	Doha, Qatar	3rd	2.24 m
2017	Asian Championships	Bhubaneswar, India	6th	2.20 m
2017	Asian Indoor and Martial Arts Games	Ashgabat, Turkmenistan	3rd	2.21 m
2018	Commonwealth Games	Gold Coast, Australia	11th (q); 13th	2.21 (q); NM (F)

== See also ==
- List of Sri Lankans by sport
