= Hikaru Tsuchiya =

Japanese high jumper

Personal information
- Nationality: Japanese
- Born: 1 February 1986 (age 40) Osaka Prefecture, Japan
- Education: University of Tsukuba
- Height: 1.71 m (5 ft 7 in)
- Weight: 58 kg (128 lb)

Sport
- Country: Japan
- Sport: Track and field
- Event: High jump

Achievements and titles
- Personal best: 2.25 m (Osaka 2009)
Medal record
Men's athletics
Representing Japan
East Asian Games
Gold medal – first place	2009 Hong Kong	High jump
World Youth Championships
Bronze medal – third place	2003 Sherbrooke	High jump

Hikaru Tsuchiya (土屋 光, Tsuchiya Hikaru; born 1 February 1986 in Osaka Prefecture) is a Japanese high jumper. He is the bronze medallist in the high jump at the 2003 World Youth Championships and the champion at the 2009 East Asian Games.

== Personal best ==
Event	Height	Competition	Venue	Date
High jump	2.25 m	Osaka Grand Prix	Osaka, Japan	9 May 2009

== International competition ==
Year	Competition	Venue	Position	Event	Height
Representing Japan
2003	World Youth Championships	Sherbrooke, Canada	3rd	High jump	2.11 m
2004	World Junior Championships	Grosseto, Italy	8th	High jump	2.18 m PB
2006	Asian Games	Doha, Qatar	6th	High jump	2.19 m
2007	Summer Universiade	Bangkok, Thailand	7th	High jump	2.15 m
2008	Asian All Star Meet	Bhopal, India	1st	High jump	2.18 m
2009	East Asian Games	Hong Kong, China	1st	High jump	2.18 m
2010	Asian Indoor Championships	Tehran, Iran	5th	High jump	2.17 m
2010	Asian All Star Meet	New Delhi, India	4th	High jump	2.10 m

== National title ==
- Japanese Championships
  - High jump: 2008
