= 2013 Asian Athletics Championships – Men's high jump =

The men's high jump at the 2013 Asian Athletics Championships was held at the Shree Shiv Chhatrapati Sports Complex on 7 July.

== Results ==
Rank	Name	Nationality	1.95	2.00	2.05	2.10	2.15	2.18	2.21	2.24	Result	Notes
1st place, gold medalist(s)	Bi Xiaoliang	China	–	o	o	xo	o	o	o	xxx	2.21	
2nd place, silver medalist(s)	Jithin Thomas	India	–	–	o	o	xo	o	o	xxx	2.21	
2nd place, silver medalist(s)	Keyvan Ghanbarzadeh	Iran	–	–	–	xo	o	o	o	xxx	2.21	
4	Hiromi Takahari	Japan	–	–	–	o	–	o	xxo	xxx	2.21	
5	Majed Al-Din Ghazal	Syria	–	–	o	o	xxo	–	xxo	xxx	2.21	
5	Wang Chen	China	–	o	o	o	xo	xo	xxo	xxx	2.21	
7	Takashi Eto	Japan	–	–	–	o	o	o	xxx		2.18	
8	Manjula Kumara	Sri Lanka	–	–	–	o	o	xo	xxx		2.18	
9	Nikhil Chittarasu	India	–	o	o	o	xxo	xxx			2.15	
10	Lee Sung	South Korea	–	–	o	xo	xxo	xxx			2.15	
11	Nawaf Al-Yami	Saudi Arabia	–	o	o	o	xxx				2.10	
12	Pramote Pumurai	Thailand	–	o	o	xo	xxx				2.10	
13	Lee Hup Wei	Malaysia	–	o	o	xxo	xxx				2.10	
14	Navinraj Subramaniam	Malaysia	–	o	o	xxx					2.05	
15	Yahya Abdul Haqim	Brunei	o	xo	xxx						2.00	
	Muamer Aissa Barsham	Qatar	–	xxx							NM	
	Saeed Abass	United Arab Emirates									DNS	
