= Athletics at the 2018 Commonwealth Games – Men's high jump =

Men's high jump at the 2018 Commonwealth Games
- Venue: Carrara Stadium
- Dates: 9 April (qualifying round); 11 April (final)
- Competitors: 20 from 13 nations
- Winning height: 2.32 m

Medalists
| gold medal | Brandon Starc | Australia |
| silver medal | Jamal Wilson | Bahamas |
| bronze medal | Django Lovett | Canada |

The men's high jump at the 2018 Commonwealth Games, as part of the athletics programme, took place in the Carrara Stadium on 9 and 11 April 2018.

== Records ==
Prior to this competition, the existing world and Games records were as follows:

| World record | Javier Sotomayor (CUB) | 2.45 m | Salamanca, Spain | 23 July 1993 |
| Games record | Clarence Saunders (BER) | 2.36 m | Auckland, New Zealand | 1 February 1990 |

== Schedule ==
The schedule was as follows:

| Date | Time | Round |
|---|---|---|
| Monday 9 April 2018 | 10:20 | Qualification |
| Wednesday 11 April 2018 | 20:05 | Final |

All times are Australian Eastern Standard Time (UTC+10)

== Results ==
=== Qualifying round ===
Across two groups, those who cleared 2.27 m (Q) or at least the 12 best performers (q) advanced to the final.

| Rank | Group | Athlete | 1.95 | 2.00 | 2.05 | 2.10 | 2.15 | 2.18 | 2.21 | Result | Notes | Qual. |
|---|---|---|---|---|---|---|---|---|---|---|---|---|
| 1 | A | Jamal Wilson (BAH) | – | – | o | o | o | o | o | 2.21 | | q |
| 1 | B | Chris Baker (ENG) | – | – | – | o | o | o | o | 2.21 | | q |
| 1 | B | Django Lovett (CAN) | – | – | – | o | o | o | o | 2.21 | | q |
| 4 | A | David Smith (SCO) | – | – | – | o | xo | o | o | 2.21 | =SB | q |
| 4 | A | Brandon Starc (AUS) | – | – | – | o | o | xo | o | 2.21 | | q |
| 6 | B | Robbie Grabarz (ENG) | – | – | – | – | – | o | xo | 2.21 | | q |
| 7 | A | Lee Hup Wei (MAS) | – | – | o | o | o | o | xo | 2.21 | | q |
| 7 | B | Allan Smith (SCO) | – | – | – | – | o | xxo | o | 2.21 | | q |
| 9 | A | Tejaswin Shankar (IND) | – | – | – | o | xo | o | xo | 2.21 | | q |
| 9 | B | Donald Thomas (BAH) | – | – | – | o | o | o | xxo | 2.21 | | q |
| 11 | A | Manjula Kumara (SRI) | – | – | o | o | o | xo | xo | 2.21 | | q |
| 11 | A | Michael Mason (CAN) | – | – | – | o | o | o | xxo | 2.21 | | q |
| 13 | B | Nauraj Singh Randhawa (MAS) | – | – | – | o | xxo | o | xxo | 2.21 | | q |
| 14 | A | Tom Gale (ENG) | – | – | – | xxo | xxo | o | xxx | 2.18 | | |
| 15 | A | Breyton Poole (RSA) | – | – | o | o | o | xo | xxx | 2.18 | | |
| 16 | B | Mathieu Sawe (KEN) | – | – | o | o | o | xxx | | 2.15 | | |
| 17 | B | Joel Baden (AUS) | – | – | o | – | xo | xxx | | 2.15 | | |
| 18 | B | Vasilios Konstantinou (CYP) | – | – | – | o | xx– | x | | 2.10 | | |
| 19 | B | Kivarno Handfield (TCA) | – | o | o | xo | xxx | | | 2.10 | | |
| – | A | Malakai Kaiwalu (FIJ) | – | xxx | | | | | | NM | | |

=== Final ===
The medals were determined in the final.

| Rank | Athlete | 2.18 | 2.21 | 2.24 | 2.27 | 2.30 | 2.32 | 2.34 | Result | Notes |
|---|---|---|---|---|---|---|---|---|---|---|
| 1st place, gold medalist(s) | Brandon Starc (AUS) | o | o | xo | xo | xo | o | xr | 2.32 | PB |
| 2nd place, silver medalist(s) | Jamal Wilson (BAH) | o | o | xo | o | o | xx– | x | 2.30 | SB |
| 3rd place, bronze medalist(s) | Django Lovett (CAN) | o | o | xo | xo | xxo | xxr | | 2.30 | PB |
| 4 | Donald Thomas (BAH) | o | o | xo | xo | xxx | | | 2.27 | |
| 5 | Allan Smith (SCO) | o | xxo | o | xo | xxx | | | 2.27 | SB |
| 6 | Michael Mason (CAN) | o | xo | o | xxx | | | | 2.24 | |
| 6 | Tejaswin Shankar (IND) | xo | o | o | xxx | | | | 2.24 | |
| 8 | Lee Hup Wei (MAS) | xo | o | xxx | | | | | 2.21 | |
| 9 | Chris Baker (ENG) | xxo | xo | xxx | | | | | 2.21 | |
| 10 | Nauraj Singh Randhawa (MAS) | o | xxx | | | | | | 2.18 | |
| 10 | David Smith (SCO) | o | xxx | | | | | | 2.18 | |
| 12 | Robbie Grabarz (ENG) | xo | xxx | | | | | | 2.18 | |
| – | Manjula Kumara (SRI) | xxx | | | | | | | NM | |
