= Lee Hup Wei =

Malaysian high jumper

Personal information
- Born: 5 May 1987 (age 39) Kajang, Selangor
- Height: 1.80 m (5 ft 11 in)
- Weight: 60 kg (132 lb)

Sport
- Country: Malaysia
- Sport: Athletics
- Event: High jump

Achievements and titles
- Personal best: 2.29 m (2019)
Medal record
Men's athletics
Representing Malaysia
Asian Championships
Gold medal – first place	2007 Amman	High Jump
Southeast Asian Games
Gold medal – first place	2007 Manila	High Jump
Gold medal – first place	2009 Vientiane	High Jump
Gold medal – first place	2011 Palembang	High Jump
Gold medal – first place	2019 Philippines	High Jump
Silver medal – second place	2017 Kuala Lumpur	High Jump

Lee Hup Wei

Chinese name
- Traditional Chinese: 李合偉
- Simplified Chinese: 李合伟
- Hanyu Pinyin: Lǐ Héwěi
- Jyutping: Lei5 Hap6 Wai5
- Hokkien POJ: Lí Ha̍p-úi
- Tâi-lô: Lí Ha̍p-uí

Lee Hup Wei (Chinese: 李合偉; born 5 May 1987 in Kajang) is a Malaysian high jumper and Royal Malaysia Navy officer. At the 2019 World Championships held in Doha, Qatar, Lee became the first ever Malaysian track and field athlete to reach the final, where he classified 8th.

== Background ==
He was born in Kajang, in a family of one boy and three girls. He attended secondary education in SMK Dengkil, later he was admitted to Bukit Jalil Sports School to complete his Form 4 and Form 5 studies. Hup Wei also personnel in the Royal Malaysian Navy.

== Career ==
He finished eighth at the 2005 Asian Championships, seventh at the 2006 Asian Games and won the gold medal at the 2007 Asian Championships.

He scored numerous successes in 2007 including emerging the winner at the Asia Track and Field (AFT) championship in Jordan, winning the gold medal at the SEA Games in Korat as well as in the All Comers championship and the Thailand Open. He has also won gold in the Good Luck Beijing Games.

=== Personal best heights ===
During the Group B qualifying round at the World Championships in Doha, he improved upon his personal best with a jump of 2.29 meters. His previous personal best was 2.27 meters, achieved at the China Open in May 2008 at Beijing's National Stadium, also known as the Bird's Nest, to break the 13-year-old Malaysian record of 2.24m set by Loo Kum Zee in the 1995 Chiang Mai SEA Games. His best olympic high jump was 2.27 meters in the 2008 Beijing olympics.

Due to his feats including breaking the Malaysian high jump record, he qualified for the Beijing Olympics.

== International competitions ==
Year	Competition	Venue	Position	Notes
Representing Malaysia
2005	Asian Championships	Incheon, South Korea	8th	2.10 m
2005	Southeast Asian Games	Manila, Philippines	5th	2.11 m
2006	Asian Junior Championships	Macau, China	5th	2.14 m
2006	World Junior Championships	Beijing, China	17th (q)	2.10 m
2006	Asian Games	Doha, Qatar	9th	2.15 m
2007	Asian Championships	Amman, Jordan	1st	2.24 m
2007	Southeast Asian Games	Nakhon Ratchasima, Thailand	1st	2.19 m
2008	Olympic Games	Beijing, China	32nd (q)	2.20 m
2009	Asian Championships	Guangzhou, China	5th	2.15 m
2009	Southeast Asian Games	Vientiane, Laos	1st	2.18 m
2010	Asian Indoor Championships	Tehran, Iran	13th	2.05 m
2010	Continental Cup	Split, Croatia	5th	2.25 m^{1}
2010	Commonwealth Games	Delhi, India	5th	2.23 m
2010	Asian Games	Guangzhou, China	9th	2.15 m
2011	Southeast Asian Games	Palembang, Indonesia	1st	2.15 m
2012	Olympic Games	London, United Kingdom	30th (q)	2.16 m
2013	Asian Championships	Pune, India	13th	2.10 m
2015	Asian Championships	Wuhan, China	13th	2.05 m
2017	Asian Championships	Bhubaneswar, India	6th	2.20 m
2017	Southeast Asian Games	Kuala Lumpur, Malaysia	2nd	2.24 m
2018	Commonwealth Games	Gold Coast, Australia	8th	2.21 m
2018	Asian Games	Jakarta, Indonesia	10th	2.20 m
2019	Asian Championships	Doha, Qatar	4th	2.26 m
2019	World Championships	Doha, Qatar	8th	2.27 m
2021	Olympic Games	Tokyo, Japan	–	NM

^{1}Representing Asia-Pacific
