= Andra Manson =

American high jumper (born 1984)

Andra Kareem Manson (born April 30, 1984) is a male high jumper from the United States. His personal best jump is 2.35 metres, achieved in April 2009 in Austin. He has 2.33 on the indoor track, from February 2007 in Fayetteville.

Manson was raised in Brenham, Texas and went to Brenham High School, where he graduated from in 2002. He excelled in basketball and track while in high school, setting the US high school record in the high jump, clearing 7' 7" on July 18, 2002. He was Track and Field News "High School Athlete of the Year" in 2002. Manson competed collegiately at the University of Texas.

Also appeared in the Beijing 2008 Olympics.

== Achievements ==
Year	Competition	Venue	Position	Notes
2002	World Junior Championships	Kingston, Jamaica	1st	2.31 m
2008	World Indoor Championships	Valencia, Spain	3rd	2.30 m
