= Naoyuki Daigo =

Japanese high jumper (born 1981)

Personal information
- Born: 18 January 1981 (age 45) Tokyo, Japan
- Education: Tokai University
- Height: 1.82 m (6 ft 0 in)
- Weight: 64 kg (141 lb)

Sport
- Country: Japan
- Sport: Track and field
- Event: High jump
- Retired: 2013
- Personal best: 2.33 m (Kobe 2006)
Medal record
Men's athletics
Representing Japan
Asian Games
Bronze medal – third place	2006 Doha	High jump
Asian Championships
Silver medal – second place	2005 Incheon	High jump
Bronze medal – third place	2003 Manila	High jump
Asian Indoor Championships
Gold medal – first place	2006 Pattaya	High jump
East Asian Games
Silver medal – second place	2005 Macau	High jump
Asian Junior Championships
Gold medal – first place	1999 Singapore	High jump
Silver medal – second place	1997 Bangkok	High jump

Naoyuki Daigo (醍醐 直幸, Daigo Naoyuki; born 18 January 1981 in Tokyo) is a retired male high jumper from Japan. His personal best jump is 2.33 metres, achieved in July 2006 in Kobe. This was the Japanese record until February 2019, when Naoto Tobe broke it by two centimetres.

== Personal bests ==
Event	Height	Competition	Venue	Date	Notes
Outdoor	2.33 m	Japanese Championships	Kobe, Japan	2 July 2006	Former NR
Indoor	2.28 m	Yokohama Indoor Open	Yokohama, Japan	19 February 2006	Former NIR

== Achievements ==
Year	Competition	Venue	Position	Notes
Representing Japan
1997	Asian Junior Championships	Bangkok, Thailand	2nd	2.19 m
1998	World Junior Championships	Annecy, France	7th	2.15 m
1999	Asian Junior Championships	Singapore	1st	2.21 m
2003	Asian Championships	Manila, Philippines	3rd	2.19 m
2005	World Championships	Helsinki, Finland	22nd (q)	2.20 m
2005	Asian Championships	Incheon, South Korea	2nd	2.23 m
2005	East Asian Games	Macau	2nd	2.23 m
2006	Asian Indoor Championships	Pattaya, Thailand	1st	2.17 m
2006	Asian Games	Doha, Qatar	3rd	2.23 m
2007	World Championships	Osaka, Japan	30th (q)	2.19 m
2008	Asian Indoor Championships	Doha, Qatar	6th	2.14 m
2008	World Indoor Championships	Valencia, Spain	17th (q)	2.15 m
2008	Olympic Games	Beijing, China	36th (q)	2.15 m
2009	World Championships	Osaka, Japan	22nd (q)	2.20 m
2009	Asian Championships	Guangzhou, China	6th	2.15 m

== National titles ==
- Japanese Championships
  - High jump: 2003, 2005, 2006, 2007, 2009

== See also ==
- List of Asian Games medalists in athletics
