= 2005 Asian Athletics Championships – Men's high jump =

The men's high jump event at the 2005 Asian Athletics Championships was held in Incheon, South Korea on September 4.

== Results ==
Rank	Name	Nationality	Result	Notes
1st place, gold medalist(s)	Manjula Kumara	Sri Lanka	2.27	NR
2nd place, silver medalist(s)	Naoyuki Daigo	Japan	2.23	
3rd place, bronze medalist(s)	Zhang Shufeng	China	2.23	
4	Nguyen Duy Bang	Vietnam	2.19	SB
5	Omar Moussa Al-Masrahi	Saudi Arabia	2.15	
5	Nalin Ratnasiri	Sri Lanka	2.15	=PB
7	Oh Jin-Wook	South Korea	2.15	=SB
8	Salem Al-Anezi	Kuwait	2.10	
8	Lee Hup Wei	Malaysia	2.10	
10	Jamal Fakhri Al-Qasim	Saudi Arabia	2.10	
11	Ahmad Najwan Aqra	Malaysia	2.10	
12	Sergey Zasimovich	Kazakhstan	2.10	
13	Jean-Claude Rabbath	Lebanon	2.10	
14	Rashid Al-Mannai	Qatar	2.10	
15	Satoru Kubota	Japan	2.05	
16	Chokchai Jirasukrujee	Thailand	2.05	
17	Ji Jae-Hyung	South Korea	2.05	
18	Cao Yaoqing	Singapore	2.00	PB
19	Tsao Chih-Hao	Chinese Taipei	2.00	PB
20	Chen Hung-Chieh	Chinese Taipei	1.95	
21	Aleksandr Efimenko	Kyrgyzstan	1.90	PB
