= Eduard Malchenko =

Russian high jumper

Eduard Malchenko (Russian: Едуapд Maльчeнкo; born 24 November 1986) is a Russian high jumper. His personal best is 2.30 m (7 ft 6 1/2 in), achieved in June 2010 in Yerino.

He is mainly known as the gold medalist at the 2009 Summer Universiade. He also finished eighth at the 2011 Summer Universiade.

His father Sergey Malchenko was also a professional high jumper, who achieved a best of 2.38 m (7 ft 9 1/2 in).
