= Liam Zamel-Paez =

Australian-born high jumper (born 1988)

Liam Jeffrey Zamel-Paez (born 4 August 1988) is an Australian-born high jumper who switched nations in 2014 and now represents Ireland.

He was born in Paddington, New South Wales. He later moved to Brisbane when he was 5, completing high school at Gregory Terrace in 2006. Competed 2005 World Youth Championships athletics. He finished ninth at the 2006 World Junior Championships, eighth at the 2006 World Cup, ninth at the 2007 Summer Universiade and fifth at the 2009 Summer Universiade. 2010 Commonwealth Games ( Athletics ) He won the 2007, 2009 and 2010 Australian Championships. Won 2014 Ireland Athletic Championships.

His personal best is 2.29 metres, achieved in March 2013 in Perth.

== See also ==
- List of eligibility transfers in athletics
