= Muamer Barsham =

Qatari high jumper (born 1994)

Personal information
- Born: 3 January 1994 (age 32) Doha, Qatar
- Height: 1.85 m (6 ft 1 in)
- Weight: 74 kg (163 lb) (2014)

Sport
- Country: Qatar
- Sport: Athletics
- Event: High jump

Muamer Essa Barsham (born 3 January 1994 in Doha) is a Qatari athlete specialising in the high jump. He won his first major senior medal at the 2014 Asian Games.

He is the younger brother of fellow Qatari high jumper, Mutaz Essa Barshim, who is a multiple medalist at continental and world events and the current Asian record holder. Just like his brother he is coached by Stanisław Szczyrba. His other brother Meshaal is a professional footballer.

He has personal bests of 2.28 metres outdoors (Sopot 2014) and 2.25 metres indoor in Ireland (Athlone)

== Competition record ==
Year	Competition	Venue	Position	Notes
Representing Qatar
2011	World Youth Championships	Lille, France	10th	2.00 m
2011	Arab Championships	Al Ain, United Arab Emirates	7th	2.05 m
2012	Asian Junior Championships	Colombo, Sri Lanka	1st	2.16 m
2012	World Junior Championships	Barcelona, Spain	14th (q)	2.14 m
2012	West Asian Championships	Dubai, United Arab Emirates	5th	2.15 m
2013	Arab Championships	Doha, Qatar	4th	2.15 m
2013	Asian Championships	Pune, India	–	NM
2013	Jeux de la Francophonie	Nice, France	7th	2.15 m
2013	Islamic Solidarity Games	Palembang, Indonesia	4th	2.16 m
2014	Asian Indoor Championships	Hangzhou, China	7th	2.10 m
2014	Asian Games	Incheon, South Korea	3rd	2.25 m
2015	Arab Championships	Isa Town, Bahrain	3rd	2.13 m
2015	Asian Championships	Wuhan, China	11th	2.10 m
2016	Asian Indoor Championships	Doha, Qatar	11th	2.10 m
