= Vitaliy Tsykunov =

Kazakhstani high jumper

Vitaliy Tsykunov (Russian: Виталий Викторович Цыкунов; born 22 January 1987) is a retired Kazakhstani high jumper.

He was born in Ust-Kamenogorsk. As a junior competed at the 2006 World Junior Championships without reaching the final. He won the silver medal at the 2006 Asian Junior Championships the same year.

On the regional level he finished sixth at the 2007 Asian Indoor Games, eleventh at the 2007 Asian Championships, won the 2009 Asian Indoor Games, won the bronze medal at the 2009 Asian Championships and the bronze medal the 2010 Asian Games.

He also competed at the 2007 Summer Universiade and the 2009 Summer Universiade without reaching the final. He later finished fourteenth at the 2014 Asian Games.

His personal best is 2.22 metres, first achieved outdoors in July 2012 in Almaty.
