= Gaël Lévecque =

French high jumper

Personal information
- Born: 23 November 1994 (age 31)

Sport
- Country: France
- Sport: Athletics
- Event: High jump

Achievements and titles
- Personal best: High jump: 2.15 m (2011)

Gaël Lévecque (born 23 November 1994) is a French male high jumper, who won an individual gold medal at the Youth World Championships.
