= Michael Mason (high jumper) =

Canadian high jumper

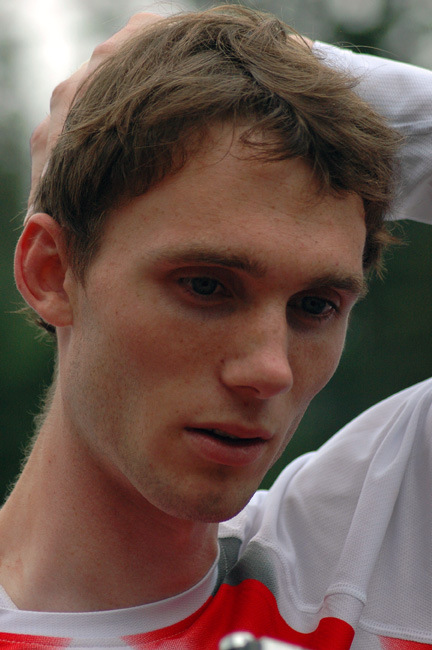
- Mason in 2008

Personal information
- Full name: Michael Robert Christopher Mason
- Nationality: Canada
- Born: 30 September 1986 (age 40) New Westminster, British Columbia
- Height: 1.86 m (6 ft 1 in)
- Weight: 70 kg (154 lb)

Sport
- Sport: Athletics
- Event: High jump

Achievements and titles
- Personal bests: High jump: 2.33, Edmonton, Eberstadt, 2015
Medal record
Pan American Games
Silver medal – second place	2015 Toronto	High jump
Silver medal – second place	2019 Lima	High jump
Commonwealth Games
Bronze medal – third place	2014 Glasgow	High jump
North American, Central American and Caribbean Championships
Silver medal – second place	2018 Toronto	High jump
World Junior Championships
Gold medal – first place	2004 Grosseto	High Jump

Michael Robert Christopher Mason (born 30 September 1986) is a Canadian high jumper. The 2004 World Junior champion, he has represented Canada at the 2008 Summer Olympics, 2008 IAAF World Indoor Championships, 2010 Commonwealth Games, 2012 Summer Olympics, 2014 Commonwealth Games, 2014 IAAF World Indoor Championships and the 2015 Pan American Games. His personal best for the event is 2.33 metres.

== Career ==
He won the IAAF World Junior Championships gold medal in 2004. From Nanoose Bay, British Columbia, Mason is only the second Canadian to win a World Junior Championship gold medal, following Mark Boswell who won in 1996. Mason holds a number of provincial records previously held by retired Canadian high jumper and 1976 Olympic Silver Medallist Greg Joy, including the BC high school, junior and senior records.

Following his world junior win, he set the current NAIA record as a member of the UBC Thunderbirds and was the bronze medalist at the 2006 NACAC U-23 Championships. He jumped a personal best of 2.27 m to win the Canadian title in 2007 Canadian Senior Championships. He is a member of the Valley Royals Track and Field Club and is coached by Ziggy Szelagowicz.

In 2008 Mason improved his personal best during the indoor season, to 2.30 in January in Seattle. At the 2008 World Indoor Championships he finished eighth. He made his Olympic debut a few months later at the 2008 Beijing Olympics and placed eighth in his qualifying group with a jump of 2.25 m, although he missed the final. Competing as a student-athlete, he took the silver medal in the high jump at the 2009 Summer Universiade. The year after he represented Canada at the 2010 Commonwealth Games with a seventh-place finish in the final.

He cleared 2.31 m for the first time at the Baie-Mahault Grand Prix in Guadeloupe, winning the event with a meet record mark. In 2015 Mason improved his indoor personal best to 2.31m at the Millrose Games and his outdoor best to 2.33m at the Edmonton Track Classic.

In the leadup to the 2020 Summer Olympics in Tokyo, Mason came second at the Canadian track and field trials, behind Django Lovett. He was thus named to the Canadian Olympic team. Competing at the Olympic high jump event, he ranked fourteenth in the qualification round and did not advance to the final.

== Honours ==
In 2012 Mason was awarded the Queen Elizabeth II Diamond Jubilee Medal.

== Achievements ==
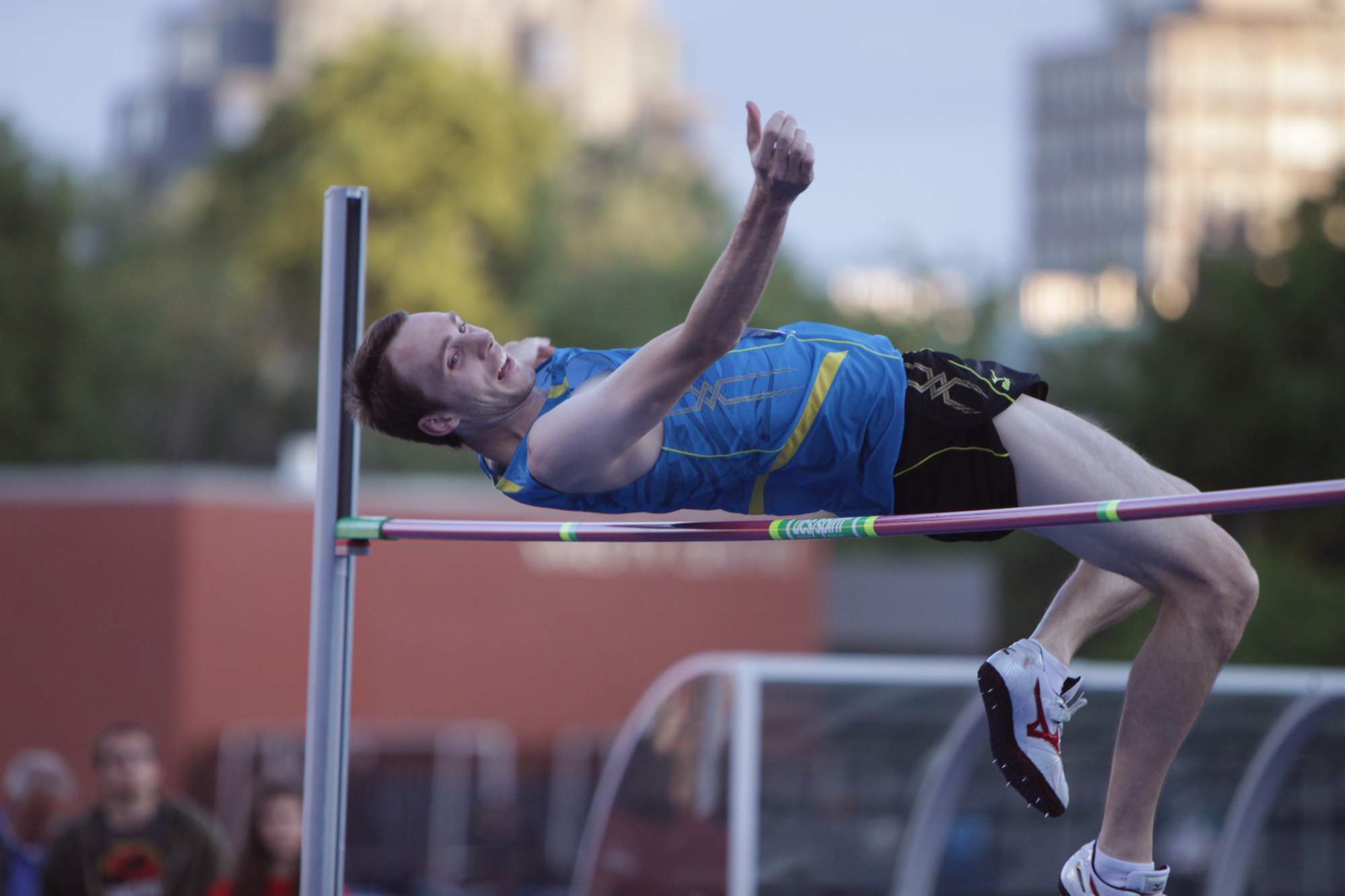
Michael Mason

Year	Competition	Venue	Position	Notes
Representing Canada
2004	World Junior Championships	Grosseto, Italy	1st	2.21 m
2006	NACAC U-23 Championships	Santo Domingo, Dominican Republic	3rd	2.19 m
2007	Universiade	Bangkok, Thailand	18th (q)	2.10 m
2008	World Indoor Championships	Valencia, Spain	8th	2.27 m
2008	Olympic Games	Beijing, China	19th (q)	2.25 m
2009	Universiade	Belgrade, Serbia	2nd	2.23 m
2010	Commonwealth Games	Delhi, India	7th	2.20 m
2012	Olympic Games	London, United Kingdom	7th	2.29 m
2013	World Championships	Moscow, Russia	25th (q)	2.17 m
2014	World Indoor Championships	Sopot, Poland	8th	2.25 m
2014	Commonwealth Games	Glasgow, United Kingdom	3rd	2.25 m
2015	Pan American Games	Toronto, Ontario, Canada	2nd	2.31 m
2015	World Championships	Beijing, China	18th (q)	2.26 m
2016	Olympic Games	Rio de Janeiro, Brazil	18th (q)	2.26 m
2017	World Championships	London, United Kingdom	18th (q)	2.26 m
2018	Commonwealth Games	Gold Coast, Australia	6th	2.24 m
2018	NACAC Championships	Toronto, Canada	2nd	2.28 m
2019	Pan American Games	Lima, Peru	2nd	2.28 m
2019	World Championships	Doha, Qatar	7th	2.30 m
2020	Olympic Games	Tokyo, Japan	14th (q)	2.25 m
