= Liu Yang (high jumper) =

Chinese high jumper (born 1986)

Personal information
- Full name: Liu Yang
- Nationality: China
- Born: 27 October 1986 (age 39) Liaoning, China
- Height: 1.88 m (6 ft 2 in)
- Weight: 64 kg (141 lb)

Sport
- Sport: Athletics
- Event: High jump

Achievements and titles
- Personal best: High jump: 2.27 (2004)

Liu Yang (simplified Chinese: 刘洋; traditional Chinese: 劉 洋; pinyin: Liú yáng; born January 4, 1986, in Liaoning) is a Chinese high jumper. Representing his nation China in the men's high jump at the 2004 Summer Olympics, Liu cleared a height at 2.27 m to establish his own personal best from the Chinese Olympic Trials in Shijiazhuang.

Liu qualified for the Chinese squad as an 18-year-old lone athlete in the men's high jump at the 2004 Summer Olympics in Athens. Three months before the Games, Liu auspiciously passed the exact Olympic B-height and registered his own personal best of 2.27 m at the Olympic Trials in Shijiazhuang to assure a place on the Chinese track and field team. Liu struggled to raise the bar at the start with two unbearable fouls until he successfully cleared by chance on his third attempt at 2.10 m. After failing to reach the height of 2.15 in a single rewarding attempt, Liu was instead relegated to become the last high jumper to round off the overall standings against a field of the remaining thirty-six at the end of the qualifying round.
