= Nikhil Chittarasu =

Indian high jumper (born 1990)

Nikhil Chittarasu (born 24 August 1990) is an Indian high jumper.

He finished eighth at the 2009 Asian Indoor Games, thirteenth at the 2010 Commonwealth Games, won the silver medal at the 2010 South Asian Games, competed at the 2010 Asian Games without reaching the final and finished ninth at the 2013 Asian Championships.

His personal best is 2.21 metres, achieved in May 2013 in Colombo.
