= Sergey Zasimovich =

Kazakh high jumper (born 1986)

Medal record

Men's athletics

Representing Kazakhstan

Asian Indoor Championships
Gold medal – first place	2008 Doha	High jump

Sergey Sergeyevich Zasimovich (Russian: Серге́й Серге́евич Засимович; born 11 March 1986) is a retired Kazakh high jumper.

Zasimovich was born in Karagandinskaya. As a junior, he finished seventh at the 2004 Asian Junior Championships and twelfth at the 2005 Asian Championships, and won the gold medal at the 2005 Asian Indoor Games. In 2006, he finished fifth at the Asian Indoor Championships, but won the silver medal at the Asian Games. He won a silver at the 2007 Asian Indoor Games and the gold medal at the 2008 Asian Indoor Championships.

Zasimovich's success at regional meets then waned some, finishing ninth at the 2009 Asian Championships, sixth at the 2010 Asian Indoor Championships and eleventh at the 2011 Asian Championships.

Zasimovich has never reached a final at a major global competition. He competed at the 2007 World Championships, the 2008 World Indoor Championships, the 2008 Olympic Games, the 2009 Summer Universiade, the 2010 World Indoor Championships and the 2010 Asian Games without reaching the final.

Zasimovich's personal best of 2.30 metres was recorded in June 2007 in Bangkok. He is 1.93 m and weighs 72 kg. His father and coach, also called Sergey Zasimovich, was a high jumper as well.

== Competition record ==
Year	Competition	Venue	Position	Notes
Representing Kazakhstan
2004	Asian Junior Championships	Ipoh, Malaysia	7th	2.04 m
2005	Asian Championships	Incheon, South Korea	12th	2.10 m
2005	Asian Indoor Games	Bangkok, Thailand	1st	2.17 m
2006	Asian Indoor Championships	Pattaya, Thailand	5th	2.13 m
2006	Asian Games	Doha, Qatar	2nd	2.23 m
2007	World Championships	Osaka, Japan	35th (q)	2.19 m
2007	Asian Indoor Games	Macau	2nd	2.21 m
2008	Asian Indoor Championships	Doha, Qatar	1st	2.24 m
2008	World Indoor Championships	Valencia, Spain	13th (q)	2.20 m
2008	Olympic Games	Beijing, China	37th (q)	2.10 m
2009	Universiade	Belgrade, Serbia	13th (q)	2.15 m
2009	Asian Championships	Guangzhou, China	9th	2.10 m
2010	Asian Indoor Championships	Tehran, Iran	6th	2.14 m
2010	World Indoor Championships	Doha, Qatar	–	NM
2010	Asian Games	Guangzhou, China	17th (q)	2.05 m
2011	Asian Championships	Kobe, Japan	11th	2.10 m
