= Mutaz Barsham =

Qatari high jumper (born 1991)

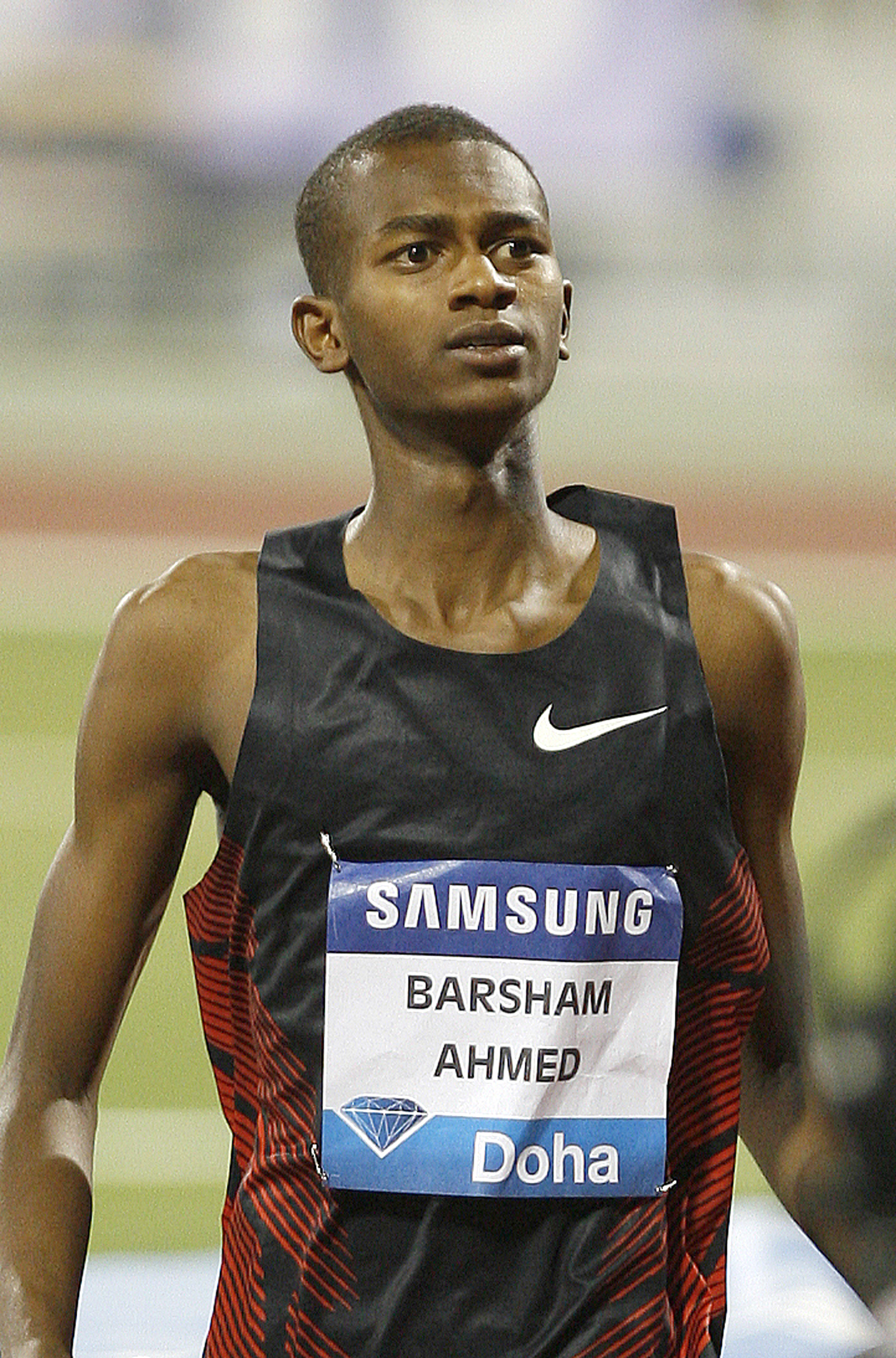
- Barsham in 2011

Personal information
- Full name: Mutaz Essa Barsham
- Nationality: Qatar
- Born: 24 June 1991 (age 35) Doha, Qatar
- Height: 1.88 m (6 ft 2 in)
- Weight: 70 kg (154 lb)
- Website: mutazbarshim.net at the Wayback Machine (archived 3 October 2025)

Sport
- Country: Qatar
- Sport: Athletics
- Event: High jump

Achievements and titles
- Highest world ranking: 1 (weeks 23)
- Personal bests: Outdoor; High jump: 2.43 m (7 ft 11 1/2 in) AR (Brussels 2014); Indoor; High jump: 2.41 m (7 ft 10 3/4 in) AR (Athlone 2015)
Medal record
Men's athletics
Representing Qatar
Olympic Games
Gold medal – first place	2020 Tokyo	High jump
Silver medal – second place	2012 London	High jump
Silver medal – second place	2016 Rio de Janeiro	High jump
Bronze medal – third place	2024 Paris	High jump
World Championships
Gold medal – first place	2017 London	High jump
Gold medal – first place	2019 Doha	High jump
Gold medal – first place	2022 Eugene	High jump
Silver medal – second place	2013 Moscow	High jump
Bronze medal – third place	2023 Budapest	High jump
World Indoor Championships
Gold medal – first place	2014 Sopot	High jump
Silver medal – second place	2018 Birmingham	High jump
Asian Games
Gold medal – first place	2010 Guangzhou	High jump
Gold medal – first place	2014 Incheon	High jump
Gold medal – first place	2022 Hangzhou	High jump
Asian Championships
Gold medal – first place	2011 Kobe	High jump
Bronze medal – third place	2015 Wuhan	High jump
Asian Indoor Championships
Gold medal – first place	2010 Tehran	High jump
Gold medal – first place	2012 Hangzhou	High jump
Gold medal – first place	2014 Hangzhou	High jump
Gold medal – first place	2016 Doha	High jump
Gold medal – first place	2018 Tehran	High jump
Military World Games
Gold medal – first place	2011 Rio de Janeiro	High jump
Arab Games
Gold medal – first place	2011 Doha	High jump
Arab Championships
Gold medal – first place	2011 Al Ain	High jump
Gold medal – first place	2013 Doha	High jump
Gold medal – first place	2015 Isa Town	High jump
World Junior Championships
Gold medal – first place	2010 Moncton	High jump
Asian Junior Championships
Gold medal – first place	2010 Hanoi	High jump
Arab Junior Championships
Gold medal – first place	2010 Cairo	High jump
Representing Asia-Pacific
Continental Cup
Silver medal – second place	2014 Marrakesh	High jump

Mutaz Essa Barsham (Note: Also romanized as Barshim.) (Arabic: معتز عيسى برشم, romanized: Muʿtazz ʿĪsā Baršam; born 24 June 1991) is a Qatari track and field athlete who competes in the high jump and is the former Olympic Champion. He is also the former World Champion and second highest jumper of all-time with a personal best of 2.43. He won gold at the 2017 World Championships in London, at the 2019 World Championships in Doha, as well as the 2022 World Championships in Eugene.

At the Olympics, Barsham originally won the full set of medals with bronze at the London 2012 Summer Olympics, silver at the 2016 Summer Olympics in Rio de Janeiro, and shared gold at the 2020 Summer Olympics in Tokyo. In 2021, his bronze in the 2012 Summer Olympics in London was promoted to silver in a three-way tie for second due to disqualification of the original gold medalist, leaving him with two silvers and a gold. His bronze at the Paris 2024 Summer Olympics yet again completed his full set of Olympic medals. He was the Asian Indoor and World Junior champion in 2010, and won the high jump gold medals at the 2011 Asian Athletics Championships and 2011 Military World Games. He holds the Asian record in high jump.

Barsham jumps off his left foot, using the Fosbury Flop technique, with a pronounced backwards arch over the bar which he achieves by looking over the landing mat. One of his brothers, Muamer, is also a high jumper. Barsham is regarded as one of the best high jumpers of all time with 4 Olympic medals, including one Olympic gold medal.

== Biography ==
=== Early life ===
Barshim was born in Doha to a Sudanese family. He has five brothers and a sister. His father was also a track and field athlete, which is why almost all of the Barsham children became active in this sport, except for Meshaal Barsham who later became a football goalkeeper. Barsham tried running and long jumping in his youth. He said in an IAAF interview, "I grew up, nothing special, like any kid in Qatar. I joined a club because my father was going to the club training so sometimes he used to take me there with him. I knew athletics because of my father." He attended an Arabic school in Doha, where he learned to speak English. At age 15 he switched to high jump because it looked more fun. He began training in Doha at the Aspire Academy. He finished training at ASPIRE in 2009, when his personal best was 2.14 m. In September 2009, he met his new (and current) coach from Poland/Sweden Stanisław "Stanley" Szczyrba who started to train him in Doha. He has been his coach since and as Barsham said, "He is more than a coach, we are like father and son." During the summer season in Europe, they spent time at Szczyrba's home in Warsaw, Poland, and they also trained in Sweden so that Barsham did not have to waste time flying to and from Qatar between competitions.

Barsham enjoyed his first international successes in 2010. He set an indoor Qatari record in Gothenburg in early February with a jump of 2.25 m, and then went on to take the gold medal at the 2010 Asian Indoor Athletics Championships, winning with a clearance of 2.20 m. He was selected to represent Qatar at the 2010 IAAF World Indoor Championships in Doha and his performance of 2.23 m left him in fourteenth place in the qualifying round. These feats made him the first ever graduate of the ASPIRE Academy competing at the World Championships as well as holding the national record in an Olympic sport. In May 2010, Barsham won the Arab Athletics Championships for Juniors in Cairo, clearing an outdoor best of 2.23 m, and then went on to secure the continental junior title at the 2010 Asian Junior Athletics Championships. His winning mark at the competition (2.31 m) was a national record and a world-leading mark for junior athletes – and it was also the best jump by a junior since Huang Haiqiang cleared 2.32 m in 2006. He went on to win at the 2010 World Junior Championships in Athletics in Moncton, winning with a height of 2.30 m.

=== 2011 ===
He won gold in the Asian Athletics Championships in Kobe after clearing a height of 2.35 m, a new national and championship record. He continued his good form and won a gold medal at the Military World Games in Rio de Janeiro, Brazil with a 2.28 m clearance. He made his debut on the global senior stage at the 2011 World Athletics Championships in Daegu and reached the final, missing a medal on count-back and ranking seventh overall. He became high-jump champion at the Gulf Council Championships and the Arab Championships before capping off his year with yet another international gold medal at the 2011 Pan Arab Games held on home soil in Doha.

=== 2012 ===
At the 2012 indoor Asian Championships, held in Hangzhou, China, on 19 February 2012, Barsham won the gold medal and established a new personal best (and national record) of 2.37 m (7 ft 9 in), breaking the previous championship record of 2.34: it was also the highest indoor jump in the world, to date in 2012. He began jumping at 2.10 and had first try clearances at 2.15, 2.20 and 2.24, before missing once at 2.28, temporarily falling to second place when Chinese jumper Zhang Guowei cleared on his first try. Zhang then failed at 2.31, while Barsham resumed his flawless jumping with first try clears at 2.31, 2.34 and 2.37. He then failed in three attempts at 2.40.

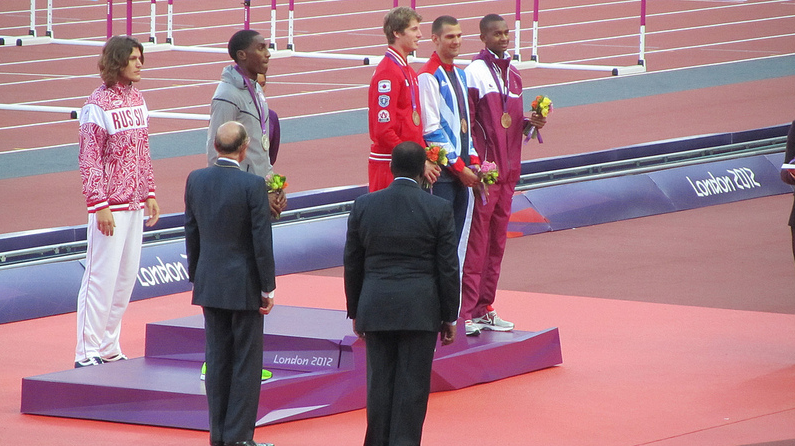
Barsham on the 2012 Olympic podium

At the 2012 Olympic Games, held in London, United Kingdom, on 7 August, Barsham won the bronze medal with a jump of 2.29, finishing in a 3-way tie for third place with Derek Drouin from Canada and Robert Grabarz from Great Britain. In 2019 the winner of the competition, Ivan Ukhov, was stripped of the gold medal by the Court of Arbitration in Sport for doping offences and in 2021 Barsham, alongside Drouin and Grabarz, were promoted to joint silver medals for the event.

Barsham suffered a back injury in early 2012 and (later) said he was not healthy at the London Olympics. The problem was found to be a stress fracture in the fifth (L5) Lumbar vertebrae. In an interview for the IAAF in April 2013, Barsham said: "It started hurting bad before the (2012) World Indoor Championships and then I had to stop for a bit. Before the Olympics, I had to stop again, but we have a really good sports center in Doha and I also received treatment in Warsaw."

=== 2013 ===
Barsham began his 2013 season indoors, in Sweden, in mid-January. He entered six competitions in Europe in 3 1/2 weeks, always jumping 2.30 or better and winning five out of the six competitions, before his back injury forced an early end. His season-best of 2.37 matched his career indoor best and was the highest in the world indoors in 2013.

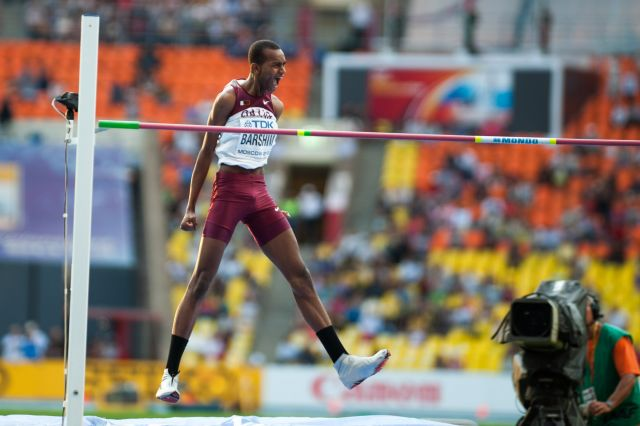
Barsham celebrating a clearance at the 2013 World Championships

He started with two "smaller" competitions in Sweden, jumping 2.30 on 13 January, and then an (early) world-leading 2.33 (7' 7 3/4") in Växjö on 20 January. He then competed in the invitation-only Moravia High Jump Tour, finishing 2nd (on misses) behind Olympic champion Ivan Ukhov as both jumped 2.30 in Hustopeče on 26 January. Then Barsham won the second leg at Trinec on 29 January, tying the meet the record of 2.34. On 3 February, he won the Russian Winter Games in Moscow with yet another world-leading jump of 2.37 – which also tied his Asian indoor record from 2012 – ending that competition with a narrow miss at 2.40. He then flew to the Europa SC High Jump competition in Banská Bystrica, Slovakia, where his aching back restricted his jumps. In one of the strongest fields of the year, five jumpers cleared 2.30. Barsham began at 2.15, next cleared 2.30, then passed until 2.36 where his 3rd attempt clearance (only his fifth jump overall) gave him the win.

Barsham's indoor season ended on 6 February as he did not want to risk further injury, hoping to be able to thrill his hometown fans when the IAAF's Diamond League opens 2013's outdoor season in Doha on 10 May.

Mutaz started his outdoor season on 10 April 2013 with an "appearance" at the GCC Athletics Championships held at Doha's Khalifa International Stadium. He took only two jumps, casually running in from almost half the distance of his usual approach to clear 2.19 meters with his first attempt and then improving to 2.25 with his second. Having clinched the win, he quit to avoid hurting his back. His younger brother Muamer took second place with a jump of 2.16.

At the Prefontaine Classic Diamond League Meet in Eugene, Oregon (1 June 2013), Barsham won, being one of 3 men to clear 2.36 (7'8 3/4"), a new meet record. Barsham was in the lead with no misses. After everyone missed their attempts at 2.39, Barsham, jumping last, saved his final (third) attempt for one try at new personal best of 2.40 (7' 10") and made it. He became the 8th man in history to have cleared 2.40 outdoors, and the first since 2000. His best result in 2013 was a silver medal at the 2013 IAAF World Championships in Athletics in Moscow, Russia.

=== 2014 ===
Barsham jumped sparingly during the 2014 Indoor season because of chronic back pain. Nonetheless, he entered the 2014 IAAF World Indoor Championships in Sopot, Poland on 8 and 9 March as favorite to medal, behind heavily favored Russian jumper Ivan Ukhov. In the Finals on Sunday 9 March, Barsham was sensational, clearing 7 consecutive heights on his first attempt, including a new Asian indoor record of 2.38 m (7 ft 9 3/4 in). Ukhov required 3 attempts to clear that height and when both men failed at 2.40 m, Barsham won the gold medal, while Ukhov took silver based on the tie-breaking count-back (misses). The 22-year-old Qatari has now won a medal at the last 3 major competitions: bronze at the 2012 London Olympics, silver at the 2013 World Championships in Moscow, and gold at the 2014 World Indoor Championships in Sopot.

In early May, when the IAAF Diamond League came to his home, Barsham had to watch as Ukhov not only bested him but moved up to equal the third-highest jump ever 2.41 m; Barsham was relegated to fourth behind Derek Drouin and Erik Kynard. On 5 June in Rome, he reversed that result, joining the group equal to third-best ever at 2.41 while Ukhov finished in fifth behind the same athletes and Bohdan Bondarenko (who is also part of the group from 2013).

A week and a half later, at the Adidas Grand Prix, Icahn Stadium, New York City, Barsham and Bondarenko were locked in a tight competition. On his first attempt at 2.42 m, Barsham cleared and improved his personal best and his own Asian Continental record, while setting the Diamond League record with a 2014 world-leading leap equaling Patrick Sjöberg's former world record from 1987 as the second best outdoor jump in history. Moments later Bondarenko equaled Barsham's jump, also on his first attempt. Ukhov and Carlo Thränhardt (1988) have also jumped that height under the more controlled conditions indoors. Barsham then missed his first attempt at 2.44 m. Ahead on misses, Bondarenko decided to pass at 2.44 m and as a result, Barsham also passed on his remaining jumps at 2.44 m and the bar was then raised to 2.46 m, one centimeter above the existing world record height of 2.45 m set on 27 July 1993, by Javier Sotomayor of Cuba. Both jumpers took a combined five attempts at the world record height, with Barsham coming closest to clearing the height on his first attempt. Bondarenko and Barsham's jumps are the best in the world since Javier Sotomayor of Cuba cleared 2.42 m in Seville on 5 June 1994. Only Sotomayor, on four occasions, has jumped higher than these two men. The two men also made multiple attempts at the record in the final Diamond League meet of the 2014 season in Brussels. Barsham again came closest in his final attempt, clipping the bar with his heel. He won the competition with a PB of 2.43 giving him the status of being the second-highest jumper of all time, behind Sotomayor's two record jumps of 2.44 and 2.45.

In the same year Barsham also won at the 2014 Asian Indoor Athletics Championships in Hangzou, China and the 2014 Asian Games in Incheon, South Korea.

=== 2015 ===
In 2015, Barsham won the IAAF Diamond League in Eugene, Oregon which is also known as the Prefontaine Classic.

=== 2016 ===
Barsham again competed for Qatar in the Olympic Games, and earned a silver medal in high jump. That year he also won the IAAF Diamond League stops in Lausanne, Switzerland and Birmingham.

=== 2017 ===
Barsham competed for Qatar in the IAAF World Championships, and won the gold medal in high jump. The defending World and Olympic Champion, Derek Drouin of Canada was injured and did not participate. Additionally, he also won the IAAF Diamond League stops in Zurich, Birmingham, Paris and Shanghai in 2017.

=== 2018 ===
In February, at the 24th Banska Bystricia High-Jump Meet his winning streak ended after 12 first places, where he landed in second place. At the IAAF World Indoor Championships in Birmingham, UK he placed second as well. In the same year he won the IAAF Diamond League stops in Oslo and Eugene as well as the 8th Asian Indoor Athletics Championships in Tehran, Iran.

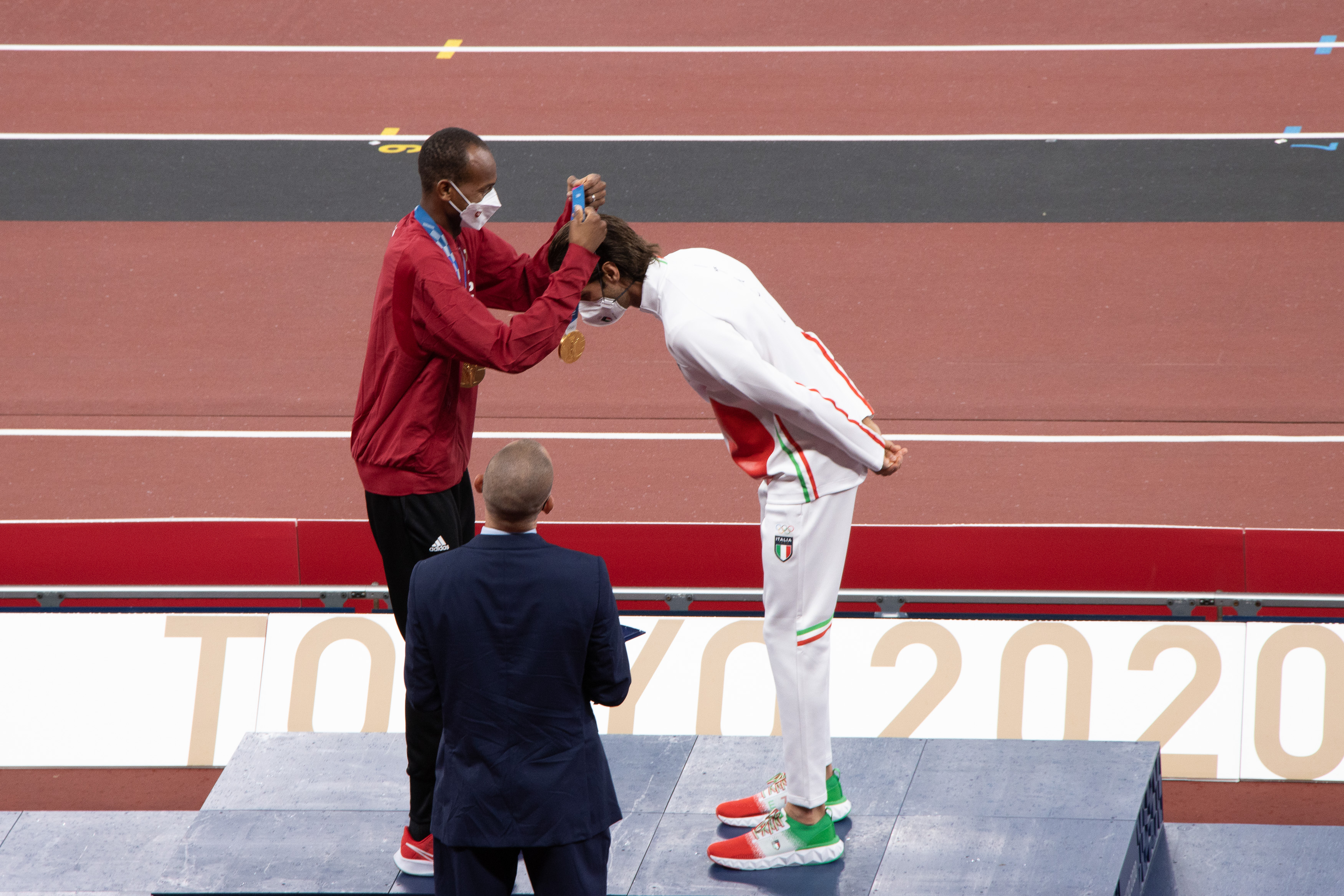
Barsham presents high jump co-winner Gianmarco Tamberi with his gold medal at the Tokyo 2020 Olympic Games.

=== 2019 ===
In October, Barsham became the first man to defend the World high jump title when he won in his home city of Doha with a world leading jump of 2.37 m.

=== 2021 ===
Barsham won the Olympic gold medal at the 2020 Summer Olympics in the high jump event, the first gold medal for Qatar in athletics (and second in any sport, after weightlifter Fares El-Bakh, who won gold in the 96 kg just one day before Barsham). He is a joint gold medal winner, as he and Italian Gianmarco Tamberi cleared a height of 2.37 m in their first attempt and subsequently failed to clear 2.39 m. Both Tamberi and Barsham agreed to share the gold medal in a rare instance in Olympic history where the athletes of different nations had agreed to share the same medal. After the failed jumps Barsham asked the referee "Can we have two golds?" and when hearing the answer was yes, embracing Tamberi saying "History, my friend".

=== 2024 ===
Barsham won the bronze medal in the high jump event at the 2024 Summer Olympics; clearing a height of 2.34 m.

== Personal life ==
He is the older brother of the Al-Sadd and Qatar national football team player Meshaal Barsham.

== Competition record ==
Year	Competition	Venue	Position	Notes
2010	Asian Indoor Championships	Tehran, Iran	1st	2.20 m
2010	World Indoor Championships	Doha, Qatar	14th (q)	2.23 m
2010	Asian Junior Championships	Hanoi, Vietnam	1st	2.31 m NR
2010	World Junior Championships	Moncton, Canada	1st	2.30 m
2010	West Asian Championships	Aleppo, Syria	2nd	2.21 m
2010	Asian Games	Guangzhou, China	1st	2.27 m
2011	Asian Athletics Championships	Kobe, Japan	1st	2.35 m NR
2011	World Championships	Daegu, South Korea	7th	2.32 m
2011	Pan Arab Games	Doha, Qatar	1st	2.30 m
2012	Asian Indoor Championships	Hangzhou, China	1st	2.37 m AR
2012	World Indoor Championships	Istanbul, Turkey	9th	2.28 m
2012	Olympic Games	London, United Kingdom	2nd	2.29 m
2012	West Asian Championships	Dubai, United Arab Emirates	1st	2.32 m
2013	World Championships	Moscow, Russia	2nd	2.38 m
2014	Asian Indoor Championships	Hangzhou, China	1st	2.36 m
2014	World Indoor Championships	Sopot, Poland	1st	2.38 m AR
2014	Asian Games	Incheon, South Korea	1st	2.35 m
2015	Asian Championships	Wuhan, China	3rd	2.20 m
2015	World Championships	Beijing, China	4th	2.33 m
2016	Asian Indoor Championships	Doha, Qatar	1st	2.35 m
2016	World Indoor Championships	Portland, United States	4th	2.29 m
2016	Olympic Games	Rio de Janeiro, Brazil	2nd	2.36 m
2017	World Championships	London, United Kingdom	1st	2.35 m
2018	Asian Indoor Championships	Tehran, Iran	1st	2.38 m
2018	World Indoor Championships	Birmingham, United Kingdom	2nd	2.33 m
2019	World Championships	Doha, Qatar	1st	2.37 m
2021	Olympic Games	Tokyo, Japan	1st	2.37 m
2022	GCC Games	Kuwait City, Kuwait	1st	2.15 m
2022	World Championships	Eugene, United States	1st	2.37 m
2023	West Asian Championships	Doha, Qatar	1st	2.20 m
2023	World Championships	Budapest, Hungary	3rd	2.33 m
2023	Asian Games	Hangzhou, China	1st	2.35 m
2024	Olympic Games	Paris, France	3rd	2.34 m

== Notes ==
Records
Preceded by (China) Zhu Jianhua	Men's High Jump Asian Record Holder; 1 June 2013 – present	Succeeded by Incumbent
Awards
Preceded by (South Africa) Wayde van Niekerk	Men's Track & Field News Athlete of the Year; 2017	Succeeded by (Kenya) Eliud Kipchoge
Sporting positions
Preceded by (Ukraine) Bohdan Bondarenko	Men's High Jump Best Year Performance alongside (Authorised Neutral Athletes) Danil Lysenko (2018); 2014-2019	Succeeded by (Belarus) Maksim Nedasekau and five other athletes (indoors)
