= Huang Haiqiang =

Chinese high jumper (born 1988)

Medal record

Men's athletics

Representing China

Asian Indoor Championships
Bronze medal – third place	2006 Pattaya	High jump

Huang Haiqiang (born 8 February 1988 in Zhejiang) is a Chinese high jumper.

He won the 2005 World Youth Championships and the 2006 World Junior Championships, the latter in a personal best jump of 2.32 metres. He competed at the 2007 World Championships without reaching the final.

He represented his country in the high jump at the 2008 Summer Olympics but came in last place.

He won the 2009 national championships with a jump of 2.24 metres, his best result since the 2007 athletics season.

== Competition record ==
Year	Competition	Venue	Position	Notes
Representing China
2005	World Youth Championships	Marrakesh, Morocco	1st	2.27 m
2005	East Asian Games	Macau, China	1st	2.23 m
2006	Asian Indoor Championships	Pattaya, Thailand	3rd	2.13 m
2006	Asian Junior Championships	Macau, China	1st	2.20 m
2006	World Junior Championships	Beijing, China	1st	2.32 m
2006	Asian Games	Doha, Qatar	15th	2.05 m
2007	World Championships	Osaka, Japan	30th (q)	2.19 m
2008	Olympic Games	Beijing, China	–	NM
2009	Asian Championships	Guangzhou, China	2nd	2.23 m
2010	Asian Games	Guangzhou, China	3rd	2.19 m
