= Keivan Ghanbarzadeh =

Iranian high jumper

Personal information
- Nationality: Iranian
- Born: May 26, 1990 (age 36) Iran

Achievements and titles
- Personal bests: 2.26 m NR
Medal record
Men's athletics
Representing Iran
Asian Indoor Championships
Silver medal – second place	2018 Tehran	High jump

Keivan Ghanbarzadeh (Persian: کیوان قنبرزاده; born 26 May 1990) is an Iranian high jumper.

== Career ==
He competed at the 2007 World Youth Championships without reaching the final. On the regional level he finished fourth at the 2009 Asian Championships, eighth at the 2010 Asian Games, won the silver medals at the 2010 Asian Indoor Championships and 2018 Asian Indoor Championships, finished sixth at the 2011 Asian Championships, sixth again at the 2011 Summer Universiade and won a silver medal at the 2013 Asian Championships.

His personal best is 2.26 meters, achieved in April 2012 in Shiraz. This is the Iranian record.
