= Hari Shankar Roy =

Indian high jumper

Personal information
- Full name: Hari Shankar Roy
- Nationality: Indian
- Born: 4 April 1986 (age 40) Jalpaiguri, West Bengal, India

Sport
- Country: India
- Sport: Track and field
- Event: High jump

Achievements and titles
- Personal bests: outdoor: 2.25 m (2004)
- Updated on 19 September 2009

Hari Shankar Roy (born 4 April 1986) is an Indian track and field athlete from West Bengal who specialises in the high jump. He held the previous national record of 2.25 metres (7 ft 4.58 in) set on 28 September 2004 in Singapore during the Asian All-Stars Athletic Championship. Which was broken by Siddharth Yadav on 07 March 2018 in Patiala at the Fed Cup.

== Career ==
Harishankar was born 4 April 1986 in Dhupjhora, a village in Jalpaiguri district of West Bengal. In 2003, Harishankar participated in the 3rd IAAF World Youth Championships in Athletics in Sherbrooke, Canada. He was eliminated in the qualifying round after failing to clear 1.95 m. In July 2004 during the 44th inter-state national athletics meet in Chennai, he broke the 11-year-old national record in men's high jump by clearing a height of 2.18 m. The previous mark of 2.17 m, set in 1993 in Bangalore, stood in the name of Chander Pal Singh of Haryana. In the same meet, Benedict Starly of Tamil Nadu also managed to clear 2.18 m, however, gold was awarded to Shankar Roy on the account of fewer number of attempts. On 28 September 2004, during the Asian All-Stars Athletic Championship in Singapore, India's best high jumper broke his own National record with a height of 2.25 m to take the silver behind Hu Tong of China. In 2007, both Hari Shanakar and Benedict Starly sailed past a height of 2.14 m during the 33rd National Games, held in Guwahati. Yet again it was Roy who won the gold on the count-back.

He won the gold medal in the high jump at the 2010 South Asian Games, clearing a height of 2.16 m.

On 10 Nov 2016, Roy's long standing record of 12 years was broken by 17-year-old boy Tejaswin Shankar at the National Jr athletics championships in Coimbatore.
