= Cycling at the 2019 African Games =

2019 Morocco African Games

- Venue: Benslimane
- Location: Casablanca, Morocco
- Dates: 21–29 August

Cycling at the 2019 African Games was held from 21 to 29 August 2019 in Casablanca, Morocco. Mountain biking was held from 21 to 23 August 2019, while road bicycle racing was held from 24 to 29 August 2019.

== Participating nations ==
- Algeria
- Angola
- Benin
- Botswana
- Burkina Faso
- Burundi
- Democratic Republic of the Congo
- Eritrea
- Ethiopia
- Ghana
- Kenya
- Lesotho
- Libya
- Mauritius
- Morocco
- Namibia
- Nigeria
- South Africa
- Rwanda
- Tunisia
- Uganda
- Zimbabwe

== Medal summary ==
=== Mountain bike ===
Event	Gold	Silver	Bronze
Men's cross-country	Tristan De Lange; Namibia	Alexander Miller; Namibia	Maher Habouria; Tunisia
Men's cross-country marathon	Tristan De Lange; Namibia	Yannick Lincoln; Mauritius	Alexander Miller; Namibia
Women's cross-country	Tiffany Keep; South Africa	Aurelie Halbwachs; Mauritius	Kimberley Le Court; Mauritius
Women's cross-country marathon	Kimberley Le Court; Mauritius	Aurelie Halbwachs; Mauritius	Nancy Akinyi Debe; Kenya (Note: Have a draw with two cyclists finishing with 2:29:58.520.) Fatima Zahraa El Hayani; Morocco

=== Road ===
Event	Gold	Silver	Bronze
Men's road race	Youcef Reguigui; Algeria	Ryan Gibbons; South Africa	Nassim Saidi; Algeria
Men's individual time trial	Ryan Gibbons; South Africa	Kent Main; South Africa	Moise Mugisha; Rwanda
Men's team time trial	South Africa; Kent Main; Julius Jayde; Ryan Gibbons; Jason Oosthuizen	Eritrea; Andu Natnael; Teweldemedhin Natnael; Abraham Sirak; Teklehaimanot Girmazio	Rwanda; Moise Mugisha; Jean Claude Nzafashwanayo; Joseph Areruya; Didier Munyaneza
Women's road race	Maroesjka Matthee; South Africa	Aurelie Halbwachs; Mauritius	Vera Adrian; Namibia
Women's individual time trial	Ashleigh Moolman; South Africa	Zanri Rossouw; South Africa	Vera Adrian; Namibia
Women's team time trial	South Africa; Tiffany Keep; Maroesjka Matthee; Carla Oberholzer; Zanri Rossouw	Eritrea; Adyam Ande; Mosana Debesay; Danait Fitsum; Desiet Tekeste	Ethiopia; Tsega Gebre Beyene; Mhiret Gebreyewhans; Selam Gerefiel; Eyerusalem Reda

== Medal table ==
* Host nation (Morocco)

Rank	Nation	Gold	Silver	Bronze	Total
1	South Africa (RSA)	6	3	0	9
2	Namibia (NAM)	2	1	3	6
3	Mauritius (MRI)	1	4	1	6
4	Algeria (ALG)	1	0	1	2
5	Eritrea (ERI)	0	2	0	2
6	Rwanda (RWA)	0	0	2	2
7	Ethiopia (ETH)	0	0	1	1
7	Kenya (KEN)	0	0	1	1
7	Morocco (MAR)*	0	0	1	1
7	Tunisia (TUN)	0	0	1	1
Totals (10 entries)		10	10	11	31
