= Swimming at the 2019 African Games – Women's 50 metre breaststroke =

Women's 50 metre breaststroke at the 2019 African Games
- Venue: Mohammed V Sports Complex – Olympic Pool
- Dates: 21 August (heats and final)
- Competitors: 19 from 16 nations
- Winning time: 32.20

Medalists
gold medal	Kaylene Corbett	South Africa
silver medal	Christin Mundell	South Africa
bronze medal	Tilka Paljk	Zambia

The Women's 50 metre breaststroke competition of the 2019 African Games was held on 21 August 2019.

== Records ==
Prior to the competition, the existing world and championship records were as follows.

	Name	Nation	Time	Location	Date
World record	Lilly King	United States	29.40	Budapest	30 July 2017
African record	Tatjana Schoenmaker	South Africa	30.82	Gold Coast	6 April 2018
Games record	Suzaan van Biljon	South Africa	32.62	Algiers	17 July 2007

The following new records were set during this competition.

Date	Event	Name	Nation	Time	Record
21 August	Final	Kaylene Corbett	South Africa	32.20	GR

== Results ==
=== Heats ===
The heats were started on 21 August at 10:45.

Rank	Heat	Lane	Name	Nationality	Time	Notes
1	2	4	Tilka Paljk	Zambia	32.67	Q
2	1	4	Christin Mundell	South Africa	32.70	Q
3	3	4	Kaylene Corbett	South Africa	32.75	Q
4	3	5	Emily Muteti	Kenya	33.62	Q
5	1	3	Sarah Soliman	Egypt	33.65	Q
6	2	5	Maria Brunlehner	Kenya	33.98	Q, WD
7	2	3	Hiba Laknit	Morocco	34.21	Q
8	1	5	Tessa Ip Hen Cheung	Mauritius	34.92	Q
9	3	6	Nomvulo Mjimba	Zimbabwe	37.03	Q
10	2	6	Angelika Ouedraogo	Burkina Faso	38.14	R
11	3	3	Bellore Sangala	Republic of the Congo	41.89	
12	3	2	Berhane Amare	Ethiopia	42.14	
13	2	2	Mariama Touré	Guinea	43.36	
14	2	7	Isha Kanu	Sierra Leone	47.24	
15	3	7	Aichata Konate	Mali	47.41	
16	1	2	Aminata Sangafe	Mali	48.13	
17	1	7	Safia Houssein Barkat	Djibouti	48.58	
18			Pilar Ndong Mangue	Equatorial Guinea	54.19	
	3	1	Samantha Rakotovelo	Madagascar	Did not start	

=== Final ===
The final was started on 21 August at 17:00.

Rank	Lane	Name	Nationality	Time	Notes
1st place, gold medalist(s)	3	Kaylene Corbett	South Africa	32.20	GR
2nd place, silver medalist(s)	5	Christin Mundell	South Africa	32.70	
3rd place, bronze medalist(s)	4	Tilka Paljk	Zambia	32.92	
4	2	Sarah Soliman	Egypt	33.46	
5	7	Hiba Laknit	Morocco	34.13	
6	6	Emily Muteti	Kenya	34.45	
7	1	Tessa Ip Hen Cheung	Mauritius	34.62	
8	8	Nomvulo Mjimba	Zimbabwe	37.03	
