= Athletics at the 2023 African Games – Women's half marathon =

Women's half marathon at the 2023 African Games
- Location: Accra, Ghana
- Dates: 22 March
- Competitors: 16 from 14 nations
- Winning time: 1:14:36

Medalists
gold medal	Atalena Loliha	South Sudan
silver medal	Zewditu Aderaw	Ethiopia
bronze medal	Nancy Chepleting Meli	Kenya

The women's half marathon event at the 2023 African Games was held on 22 March 2024 in Accra, Ghana.

== Results ==
Rank	Name	Nationality	Time	Notes
1st place, gold medalist(s)	Atalena Loliha	South Sudan	1:14:36	
2nd place, silver medalist(s)	Zewditu Aderaw	Ethiopia	1:14:40	
3rd place, bronze medalist(s)	Nancy Chepleting Meli	Kenya	1:15:07	
4	Rebecca Cheptegei	Uganda	1:15:20	
5	Mokulubete Blandina Makatsi	Lesotho	1:15:53	
6	Atalel Anmut	Ethiopia	1:16:28	
7	Cian Oldknow	South Africa	1:16:34	
8	Hamida Nassoro	Tanzania	1:18:23	
9	Rigbe Habteselassie	Eritrea	1:19:42	
10	Transfora Mussa	Tanzania	1:20:09	
11	Rutendo Nyahora	Zimbabwe	1:20:52	
12	Nwabisa Mjoli	South Africa	1:21:31	
13	Juliana Sakat	Ghana	1:22:46	
14	Hanoia Hamid	Sudan	1:25:49	
	Addisie Andualem	Ethiopia	DNF	
	Deborah Pam	Nigeria	DNS	
