= Central African Republic at the 2003 All-Africa Games =

- IOC code: CAF
- NOC: Comité National Olympique et Sportif Centrafricain

in Abuja 5 October 2003 – 17 October 2003
- Medals Ranked 19th: Gold 1 Silver 0 Bronze 0 Total 1

All-Africa Games appearances
- 1965; 1973; 1978; 1987; 1991; 1995; 1999; 2003; 2007; 2011; 2015; 2019; 2023

Central African Republic competed in the 2003 All-Africa Games held at the National Stadium in the city of Abuja, Nigeria. The country entered seventeen events, and gained a gold medal in Taekwondo, ranking joint 19th in the medal table.

== Competitors ==
Central African Republic competed in seventeen events at the games. Athletes included Maria-Joëlle Conjungo who entered the Women's 100 metres hurdles, three-time Olympian Ernest Ndjissipou in the Men's 5000 metres and Thibaut Bomaya, who went on to represent Central African Republic at the Paralympics.

== Medal summary ==
Central African Republic won a single gold medal and was ranked joint 19th alongside Cape Verde.

=== Medal table ===
| Sport | Gold | Silver | Bronze | Total |
|---|---|---|---|---|
| Taekwondo | 1 | 0 | 0 | 1 |
| Total | 1 | 0 | 0 | 1 |

== List of Medalists ==
=== Gold Medal ===
| Medal | Name | Sport | Event | Date | Ref |
|---|---|---|---|---|---|
| Gold | Bertrand Gbongou Liango | Taekwondo | Featherweight (under 67 kg) | 17 October 2003 | |
