= Cape Verde at the 2019 African Games =

- Flag of Cape Verde
- IOC code: CPV
- NOC: Comité Olímpico Caboverdeano

in Rabat, Morocco 19 August 2019 – 31 August 2019
- Competitors: 38 (28 men and 10 women) in 7 sports
- Medals Ranked 41st: Gold 0 Silver 0 Bronze 1 Total 1

African Games appearances
- 1999; 2003; 2007; 2011; 2015; 2019; 2023

Cape Verde competed at the 2019 African Games held from 19 to 31 August 2019 in Rabat, Morocco. In total, athletes representing the country won one bronze medal and the country finished last in the medal table, in 41st place, shared with Central African Republic.

== Medal summary ==
=== Medal table ===
Medal	Name	Sport	Event	Date
Bronze	Ivanusa Moreira	Boxing	Women's welterweight	28 August

Medals by sport
Sport	1st place, gold medalist(s)	2nd place, silver medalist(s)	3rd place, bronze medalist(s)	Total
Boxing	0	0	1	1
Total	0	0	1	1

== Athletics ==
Five athletes represented Cape Verde in athletics.

Eveline Sanches competed in both the women's 100 metres and the women's 200 metres events. In both events she did not advance to the semifinals.

Carla Mendes competed in the women's 800 metres event. She was also scheduled to compete in the women's 1500 metres event but she did not start.

Jordin Andrade competed in the men's 400 metres hurdles. He did not advance to compete in the final.

Samuel Freire competed in the men's 5000 metres event. He finished in 19th place. He also competed in the men's 10,000 metres. He did not finish in that event.

Ruben Sança competed in the men's half marathon and he finished in 16th place.

== Beach volleyball ==
Cape Verde was scheduled to compete in beach volleyball but did not compete.

== Boxing ==
Albertino Miguel Monteiro, Davilson Morais, Ivanusa Moreira, Sergio Antonio Rodrigues, Gelson Rodnex Semedo, Wilson Carlos Semedo and Carlos Antonio Silva were scheduled to compete in boxing.

Ivanusa Moreira won the bronze medal in the women's welterweight (69kg) event.

== Chess ==
Loedi Gomes, Luis Carlos Moniz, Honorina Morais and Joel David Pires competed in chess.

Luis Carlos Moniz and Joel David Pires both competed in the men's blitz individual and men's rapid individual events.

Loedi Gomes and Honorina Morais both competed in the women's blitz individual and women's rapid individual events.

All four competed in the mixed team event where they finished in last place.

== Karate ==
Danisia Emely Conceicao, Jose Mario Goncalves, Irlanda Lopes and Jelson Varela competed in karate.

== Taekwondo ==
Four athletes competed in Taekwondo.

Athlete	Event	Round of 32	Round of 16	Quarterfinals	Semifinals	Final	
Athlete	Event	Opposition Result	Opposition Result	Opposition Result	Opposition Result	Opposition Result	Rank
Nicalas Antonio Fernandes	Men's –63 kg	Nhial (SSD); W 44–8	Dlamini (SWZ); W 17–12	Demisu (ETH); L 2–17	did not advance		
Mbaye Massalick	Men's –68 kg	Ochieng (KEN); L 15–35	did not advance				
Vania Etsara Timas	Women's –49 kg	Sawadogo (KEN); DSQ	did not advance				
Sanderson Vicente	Women's –58 kg	Bye	Maziya (SWZ); W 11–8	Lakehal (MAR); L 4–40	did not advance		

== Volleyball ==
Cape Verde's national volleyball team qualified to compete at the 2019 African Games. They lost all five games in the men's tournament.
