= Mali at the 2003 All-Africa Games =

- IOC code: MLI
- NOC: Comité National Olympique et Sportif du Mali

in Abuja 5 October 2003 – 17 October 2003
- Medals Ranked 23rd: Gold 0 Silver 1 Bronze 5 Total 6

All-Africa Games appearances
- 1965; 1973; 1978; 1987–1991; 1995; 1999; 2003; 2007; 2011; 2015; 2019; 2023

Mali competed in the 2003 All-Africa Games held at the National Stadium in the city of Abuja, Nigeria. The country’s team won six medals and came joint twenty-third in the medal table. The country competed in the first women’s football tournament in the history of the Games, and came fourth. Bourama Mariko won a silver medal in karate, and the team gained four bronze medals in taekwondo.

== Competitors ==
Mali entered twenty nine events, twenty one for women and eight for men. After the previous two tournaments, where the country had only won a silver and two bronze medals respectively, the team was determined to bring back more medals. In the first women’s football tournament of the Games, the Malian team qualified in Group B, coming second to South Africa, but losing to Cameroon in the bronze medal play-off. Meanwhile, Moussa Konate competed in heavyweight boxing. In track and field, ten athletes competed in nine events, Oumar Diarra coming fourth in the 400 metres hurdles, Kadiatou Camara coming fifth in the long jump, Oumou Traore coming eighth in the discus and Kadiatou Camara reaching the semi-final of the 100 metres. The greatest hope, however, for the country lay in judo, and particularly Bourama Mariko, who went on to win the country’s only silver medal at the Games. At the same time, four competitors entered the karate tournament, Mamadou Ba Gueye, N’Fau Fofana, Samir Haidara and Tiekoura Sinayoko, laying foundations for the success in the sport at the following 2007 Games.

== Medal summary ==
Mali won six medals, a silver and five bronze medals, and was ranked joint twenty third in the final medal table alongside Congo and Zambia.

=== Medal table ===
Sport	Gold	Silver	Bronze	Total
Karate	0	1	0	1
Taekwondo	0	0	4	4
Total	0	1	5	6

=== Silver Medal ===
Medal	Name	Sport	Event	Date	Ref
Silver	Bourama Mariko	Judo	Men's Under 73 kg	17 October 2003	

=== Bronze Medal ===
Medal	Name	Sport	Event	Date	Ref
Bronze	Mohamed Fofona	Taekwondo	Men's Under 72 kg	16 October 2003	
Bronze	Ibrahim Niang	Taekwondo	Men's Under 62 kg	17 October 2003	
Bronze	Sitan Traoré	Taekwondo	Women's Under 51 kg	17 October 2003	
Bronze	Abdrahmane Famanta	Taekwondo	Men's Under 58 kg	18 October 2003	
