= Morris Munene Gachaga =

Kenyan long-distance runner

Personal information
- Born: 7 April 1995 (age 30)

Sport
- Country: Kenya
- Sport: Athletics
- Event: Long-distance running

Morris Munene Gachaga (born 7 April 1995) is a Kenyan long-distance runner. He competed in the men's race at the 2020 World Athletics Half Marathon Championships held in Gdynia, Poland.

In 2019, he competed in the men's half marathon at the African Games held in Rabat, Morocco.
