= Congo at the 2003 All-Africa Games =

Republic of the Congo at the 2003 All-Africa Games
- IOC code: CGO
- NOC: Comité Olympique Congolais

in Abuja 5 October 2003 – 17 October 2003
- Medals Ranked 23rd: Gold 0 Silver 1 Bronze 5 Total 6

All-Africa Games appearances
- 1965; 1973; 1978; 1987; 1991; 1995; 1999; 2003; 2007; 2011; 2015; 2019; 2023

The Republic of the Congo competed in the 2003 All-Africa Games held at the National Stadium in the city of Abuja, Nigeria. This was the eighth time that the country had competed in the Games since the Congo itself hosted the first in 1965. The country sent a substantial team which won six medals and came joint twenty-third in the medal table. Tatiana Bvegadz won a silver medal in judo. The team also received five bronze medals, including both individual and team accolades in karate.

== Competitors ==
The Republic of the Congo entered 34 events, evenly distributed amongst the competitions for men and women. Competitors included Michelle Banga Mondzoula and Roger Angouono Moke who competed in the Women's 100 and 200 metres and Men's 100 and 200 metres respectively. Olympians Devilert Arsene Kimbembe and David Nkoua joined Moke in the 100 metre relay. In the team games, the women’s handball team qualified and reached fourth place.

== Medal summary ==
Republic of the Congo won six medals, a silver and five bronze medals, and was ranked joint twenty third in the final medal table alongside Mali and Zambia.

=== Medal table ===
Sport	Gold	Silver	Bronze	Total
Judo	0	1	1	2
Karate	0	0	2	2
Total	0	1	5	6

== List of Medalists ==
=== Silver Medal ===
Medal	Name	Sport	Event	Date	Ref
Silver	Tatiana Bvegadz	Judo	Women +78 kg	15 October 2003	

=== Bronze Medal ===
Medal	Name	Sport	Event	Date	Ref
Bronze	Bokoko Ngbo Ngbo	Judo	Men's 66 kg	15 October 2003	
Bronze	Wilver Ngampika	Karate	Men's Karate Up To 60 Kg	16 October 2003	
Bronze	Republic of Congo	Karate	Men's Team Kumite	15 October 2003	
