= The Gambia at the 2019 African Games =

- Flag of the Gambia

in Rabat, Morocco 19 August 2019 – 31 August 2019
- Competitors: 21 (13 men and 8 women) in 5 sports and 16 events
- Medals Ranked 19th: Gold 2 Silver 1 Bronze 0 Total 3

African Games appearances
- 2003; 2007; 2011; 2015; 2019; 2023

The Gambia competed at the 2019 African Games held from 19 to 31 August 2019 in Rabat, Morocco. In total, athletes representing the country won two gold medals and one silver medal. The country finished in 19th place in the medal table.

== Medal summary ==
=== Medal table ===
Medal	Name	Sport	Event	Date
Gold	Sainey Jawo; Babou Jarra Mbye	Beach volleyball	Men's tournament	21 August
Gold	Gina Bass	Athletics	Women's 200 metres	30 August
Silver	Gina Bass	Athletics	Women's 100 metres	27 August

Medals by sport
Sport	1st place, gold medalist(s)	2nd place, silver medalist(s)	3rd place, bronze medalist(s)	Total
Athletics	1	1	0	2
Beach volleyball	1	0	0	1
Total	2	1	0	3

== 3x3 basketball ==
Awa Jawara, Aminata Jobe, Yassin Jaal Mboob and Adam Touray competed in 3x3 basketball in the women's tournament. The team reached the quarterfinals.

== Athletics ==
Gina Bass won the silver medal in the women's 100 metres event. She also won the gold medal in the women's 200 metres event.

Fatou Sanneh also competed in the women's 100 metres and women's 200 metres events. In both events she qualified in the heats to compete in the semifinals and in both events she did not qualify to compete in the final.

Ebrahima Camara, Adama Jammeh and Sengan Jobe competed in the men's 100 metres event. Jobe did not advance to compete in the semifinals. Jammeh reached the semifinals and Camara reached the final. Camara finished in 7th place in the final.

== Judo ==
Two athletes competed in judo: Adbdourahman Ceesay (men's −81 kg) and Omar Jobe (men's +100 kg). They were both eliminated in the first round.

== Swimming ==
Momodou Lamin Saine and Ebrima Sorry Buaro competed in swimming.

Saine competed in the men's 50 metres breaststroke event and in the men's 100 metre breaststroke event.

Buaro competed in the men's 50 metre freestyle event and in the men's 100 metre freestyle event.

== Volleyball ==
=== Beach Volleyball ===
Men

Sainey Jawo and Babou Jarra Mbye competed in beach volleyball and won the gold medal in the men's tournament.

Athlete	Preliminary round		Quarterfinals	Semifinals	Final	Rank
Athlete	Pool A	Rank	Quarterfinals	Semifinals	Final	Rank
Sainey Jawo; Babou Jarra Mbye	Naceur (TUN); Belhaj (TUN); L 1 - 2; 21-8, 15-21, 6-15	1	Nguvo (MOZ); Soares (MOZ); W 2 - 0; 21-18, 28-26	Kavalo (RWA); Ntagengwa (RWA); W 2 - 0; 21-14, 21-16	Abicha (MAR); Elgraoui (MAR); W 2 - 1; 21-17, 17-21, 17-15	1st place, gold medalist(s)
Sainey Jawo; Babou Jarra Mbye	Almarrug (LBA); Lababa (LBA); W 2 - 0; 25-23, 21-17	1	Nguvo (MOZ); Soares (MOZ); W 2 - 0; 21-18, 28-26	Kavalo (RWA); Ntagengwa (RWA); W 2 - 0; 21-14, 21-16	Abicha (MAR); Elgraoui (MAR); W 2 - 1; 21-17, 17-21, 17-15	1st place, gold medalist(s)
Sainey Jawo; Babou Jarra Mbye	Abicha (MAR); Elgraoui (MAR); W 2 - 1; 18-21, 22-20, 20-18	1	Nguvo (MOZ); Soares (MOZ); W 2 - 0; 21-18, 28-26	Kavalo (RWA); Ntagengwa (RWA); W 2 - 0; 21-14, 21-16	Abicha (MAR); Elgraoui (MAR); W 2 - 1; 21-17, 17-21, 17-15	1st place, gold medalist(s)
