= Togo at the 2003 All-Africa Games =

- IOC code: TOG
- NOC: Togolese National Olympic Committee

in Abuja 5 October 2003 – 17 October 2003
- Medals Ranked 31st: Gold 0 Silver 0 Bronze 3 Total 3

All-Africa Games appearances
- 1965; 1973; 1978; 1987–1995; 1999; 2003; 2007; 2011; 2015; 2019; 2023

Togo competed in the 2003 All-Africa Games held at the National Stadium in the city of Abuja in nearby Nigeria. The team entered twenty five events and came joint thirty first overall with three bronze medals. Medals were awarded in women's discus, men's open singles table tennis, and men's powerlifting.

== Competition ==
Togo entered twenty five events at the games, eighteen for men and seven for women. The country was well represented in athletics, particularly in the women's events. Alifatou Djibril competed in both discus and shot put, winning bronze in the former. Other athletes included Sandrine Thiebaud, who came third in the second heat for the 400 metres but failed to qualify for the final.

== Medal summary ==
The country won a tally of three medals, all bronze. The country ranked joint thirty first in the medal table.

=== Medal table ===
Sport	Gold	Silver	Bronze	Total
Athletics	0	0	1	1
Special events	0	0	1	1
Weightlifting	0	0	1	1
Total	0	0	3	3

== List of Medalists ==
=== Bronze Medal ===
Medal	Name	Sport	Event	Date	Ref
Bronze	Alifatou Djibril	Athletics	Women's Discus	12 October	
Bronze	Abdou Wali Sambale	Weightlifting	Powerlifting Men 67.5 kg	16 October	
Bronze	Kissae Gbandi	Special sports	Men's Open Singles, class 2 and 3	17 October	

== See also ==
- Togo at the African Games
