= Athletics at the 2023 African Games – Women's 200 metres =

The women's 200 metres event at the 2023 African Games was held on 21 and 22 March 2024 in Accra, Ghana.

== Medalists ==
| Gold | Silver | Bronze |
|---|---|---|
| Gina Bass; The Gambia | Olayinka Olajide; Nigeria | Natacha Ngoye Akamabi; Republic of the Congo |

== Results ==
=== Heats ===
Held on 21 March
Qualification: First 2 in each heat (Q) and the next 6 fastest (q) advanced to the semifinals.

Wind:
Heat 1: -1.4 m/s, Heat 2: -1.5 m/s, Heat 3: -2.6 m/s, Heat 4: -1.8 m/s, Heat 5: -0.6 m/s

| Rank | Heat | Name | Nationality | Time | Notes |
|---|---|---|---|---|---|
| 1 | 2 | Natacha Ngoye Akamabi | Republic of the Congo | 23.12 | Q |
| 2 | 5 | Gina Bass | The Gambia | 23.35 | Q |
| 3 | 5 | Shirley Nekhubui | South Africa | 23.36 | Q |
| 4 | 3 | Olayinka Olajide | Nigeria | 23.55 | Q |
| 5 | 1 | Jacent Nyamahunge | Uganda | 23.65 | Q |
| 6 | 3 | Bongiwe Mahlalela | Eswatini | 23.71 | Q |
| 7 | 4 | Janet Mensah | Ghana | 23.75 | Q |
| 8 | 3 | Tsaone Bakani Sebele | Botswana | 23.84 | Q |
| 9 | 2 | Obakeng Kamberuka | Botswana | 23.90 | Q |
| 10 | 1 | Claudine Njarasoa | Madagascar | 23.94 | Q |
| 11 | 3 | Gorete Semedo | São Tomé and Príncipe | 24.00 | Q |
| 12 | 2 | Chisom Onyebuchi | Nigeria | 24.02 | Q |
| 13 | 1 | Asimenye Simwaka | Malawi | 24.10 | Q |
| 14 | 4 | Pierrick-Linda Moulin | Gabon | 24.24 | Q |
| 15 | 1 | Merveille Imboula Gavouka | Republic of the Congo | 24.26 | Q, NU20R |
| 16 | 5 | Moforehan Abinusawa | Nigeria | 24.27 | Q |
| 17 | 2 | Oceane Moirt | Mauritius | 24.28 | Q |
| 18 | 3 | Ndawana Haitembu | Namibia | 24.30 | q |
| 19 | 3 | Esther Mbagari | Kenya | 24.31 | q |
| 20 | 4 | Georgiana Sesay | Sierra Leone | 24.33 | Q |
| 21 | 2 | Sara El Hachimi | Morocco | 24.41 | q |
| 22 | 3 | Elodie Malessara | Republic of the Congo | 24.47 | q |
| 23 | 4 | Banele Shabangu | South Africa | 24.51 | Q |
| 24 | 4 | Abigail Sepiso | Zambia | 24.64 | |
| 25 | 2 | Eyaye Mekuanent | Ethiopia | 24.73 | |
| 26 | 4 | Rahel Tesfaye | Ethiopia | 24.90 | |
| 27 | 1 | Jade Nangula | Namibia | 24.93 | |
| 28 | 2 | Marie Bangura | Sierra Leone | 25.17 | |
| 29 | 5 | Johanna Ludgerus | Namibia | 25.31 | Q |
| 30 | 5 | Souliatou Saka | Benin | 25.37 | |
| 31 | 1 | Lucia Moris | South Sudan | 25.38 | |
| 32 | 3 | Aminata Kamara | Sierra Leone | 25.46 | |
| 33 | 1 | Victória Cassinda | Angola | 27.36 | |
| 34 | 5 | Ruth Henriques | Angola | 27.71 | |
| | 1 | Milicent Ndoro | Kenya | DNS | |
| | 2 | Ndeye Arame Touré | Senegal | DNS | |
| | 4 | Marie Amelie Anthony | Mauritius | DNS | |
| | 5 | Baytula Aliye | Ethiopia | DNS | |

=== Semifinals ===
Held on 21 March
Qualification: First 2 in each semifinal (Q) and the next 2 fastest (q) advanced to the final.

Wind:
Heat 1: -4.1 m/s, Heat 2: -2.3 m/s, Heat 3: -1.6 m/s

| Rank | Heat | Name | Nationality | Time | Notes |
|---|---|---|---|---|---|
| 1 | 3 | Natacha Ngoye Akamabi | Republic of the Congo | 23.25 | Q |
| 2 | 1 | Gina Bass | The Gambia | 23.42 | Q |
| 3 | 2 | Olayinka Olajide | Nigeria | 23.51 | Q |
| 4 | 1 | Janet Mensah | Ghana | 23.83 | Q |
| 5 | 3 | Shirley Nekhubui | South Africa | 23.85 | Q |
| 6 | 3 | Bongiwe Mahlalela | Eswatini | 23.95 | q |
| 7 | 2 | Claudine Njarasoa | Madagascar | 23.97 | Q |
| 8 | 1 | Tsaone Bakani Sebele | Botswana | 24.01 | q |
| 9 | 2 | Pierrick-Linda Moulin | Gabon | 24.03 | |
| 10 | 2 | Gorete Semedo | São Tomé and Príncipe | 24.10 | |
| 11 | 1 | Obakeng Kamberuka | Botswana | 24.12 | |
| 12 | 3 | Chisom Onyebuchi | Nigeria | 24.15 | |
| 13 | 3 | Asimenye Simwaka | Malawi | 24.18 | |
| 14 | 2 | Jacent Nyamahunge | Uganda | 24.21 | |
| 15 | 2 | Esther Mbagari | Kenya | 24.25 | |
| 16 | 1 | Moforehan Abinusawa | Nigeria | 24.27 | |
| 17 | 2 | Ndawana Haitembu | Namibia | 24.28 | |
| 18 | 1 | Sara El Hachimi | Morocco | 24.35 | |
| 19 | 2 | Georgiana Sesay | Sierra Leone | 24.39 | |
| 20 | 1 | Merveille Imboula Gavouka | Republic of the Congo | 24.47 | |
| 21 | 3 | Oceane Moirt | Mauritius | 24.50 | |
| 22 | 3 | Elodie Malessara | Republic of the Congo | 24.70 | |
| 23 | 1 | Johanna Ludgerus | Namibia | 25.33 | |
| 24 | 3 | Banele Shabangu | South Africa | 25.48 | |

=== Final ===
Held on 22 March
Wind: -2.6 m/s

| Rank | Lane | Name | Nationality | Time | Notes |
|---|---|---|---|---|---|
| 1st place, gold medalist(s) | 4 | Gina Bass | The Gambia | 23.13 | |
| 2nd place, silver medalist(s) | 6 | Olayinka Olajide | Nigeria | 23.18 | |
| 3rd place, bronze medalist(s) | 5 | Natacha Ngoye Akamabi | Republic of the Congo | 23.42 | |
| 4 | 3 | Janet Mensah | Ghana | 23.45 | |
| 5 | 1 | Tsaone Bakani Sebele | Botswana | 23.76 | |
| 6 | 2 | Claudine Njarasoa | Madagascar | 23.82 | |
| 7 | 7 | Shirley Nekhubui | South Africa | 23.93 | |
| 8 | 8 | Bongiwe Mahlalela | Eswatini | 23.96 | |
