= Benin at the 2003 All-Africa Games =

- IOC code: BEN
- NOC: Benin National Olympic Committee

in Abuja 5 October 2003 – 17 October 2003
- Medals Ranked 23rd: Gold 0 Silver 1 Bronze 2 Total 3

All-Africa Games appearances
- 1965; 1973; 1978–1995; 1999; 2003; 2007; 2011; 2015; 2019; 2023

Benin competed in the 2003 All-Africa Games held at the National Stadium in the city of Abuja, Nigeria. The team entered nineteen events and came away with a silver and two bronze medals. The former was awarded to Stanisas Ogoudjobi in taekwondo, while the latter were awarded in special sports, one for Jean Pierre Dossou in an individual event and another with Jean-Pierre Domingo joining Dossou as a team. In the final ranking, Benin achieved twenty-seventh.

== Competition ==
The 2003 All-Africa Games were held in Nigeria. Events took place at the National Stadium constructed in the city of Abuja for the event. Benin entered a total of nineteen events, thirteen for men and six for women. Entrants included the powerlifters Ferdinand Adechi, Aboubakari Moumouni and Bienvenu Adenle. Medalists including Jean Pierre Dossou, who won two medals in para table tennis in the Special sports.

=== Medal table ===
Sport	Gold	Silver	Bronze	Total
Taekwondo	0	1	0	1
Special sports	0	0	2	2
Total	0	1	2	3

== Medal summary ==
Benin won a single silver medal and two bronze medals, and was ranked twenty seventh in the final medal table.

== List of Medalists ==
=== Silver Medal ===
Medal	Name	Sport	Event	Date	Ref
Silver	Stanisas Ogoudjobi	Taekwondo	Men's Under 72 kg	16 October 2003	

=== Bronze Medal ===
Medal	Name	Sport	Event	Date	Ref
Bronze	Jean-Pierre Dossou	Special sports	Men's Singles Class 4	13 October	
Bronze	Jean-Pierre Dossou; Jean-Pierre Domingo	Special sports	Men's team, seated (1 to 5)	14 October	
