= Burkina Faso at the 2003 All-Africa Games =

- IOC code: BUR
- NOC: Burkinabé National Olympic and Sports Committee

in Abuja 5 October 2003 – 17 October 2003
- Medals Ranked 31st: Gold 0 Silver 0 Bronze 3 Total 3

All-Africa Games appearances
- 1965; 1973; 1978; 1987; 1991; 1995; 1999; 2003; 2007; 2011; 2015; 2019; 2023

Burkina Faso competed in the 2003 All-Africa Games held at the National Stadium in the city of Abuja, Nigeria. A team from Burkina Faso had competed at the Games since the first All-Africa Games in 1965, initially competing under its then name of Upper Volta. In 2003, the team competed in sixteen events and brought back three bronze medals.

== Competitors ==
Burkina Faso first entered the All-Africa Games in 1965 at the inaurgual Games, competing as Upper Volta. In 2003, Burkina Faso entered sixteen events, eleven in the men's events and five for women. The country was particularly well represented in athletics with ten competitors entering numerous track and field events, including the men's and women's 100 metres and triple jump.

== Medal summary ==
Burkina Faso won three bronze medals and was ranked joint thirty-first in the medal table.

=== Medal table ===
Sport	Gold	Silver	Bronze	Total
Athletics	0	0	1	1
Boxing	0	1	1	1
Weightlifting	0	0	1	1
Total	0	0	1	3

== List of Medalists ==
=== Bronze Medal ===
Medal	Name	Sport	Event	Date	Ref
Bronze	Olivier Sanou	Athletics	Men's triple jump	14 October	
Bronze	Sibiri Kabore	Boxing	Light Heavyweight 81 kg	11 October	
Bronze	Alexandre Ilboudou	Weightlifting	Men's Powerlifting 52 kg	14 October	
