= Gabon at the 2003 All-Africa Games =

- IOC code: GAB
- NOC: Comité Olympique Gabonais

in Abuja 5 October 2003 – 17 October 2003
- Medals Ranked 23rd: Gold 0 Silver 1 Bronze 0 Total 1

All-Africa Games appearances
- 1965; 1973; 1978; 1987; 1991; 1995; 1999; 2003; 2007; 2011; 2015; 2019; 2023

Gabon competed in the 2003 All-Africa Games held at the National Stadium in the city of Abuja, Nigeria. The team won a single silver medal, won by Melanie Engaong in the judo tournament.

== Competitors ==
Gabon entered sixteen events. In boxing, Romeo Braxir entered the light fly. Gable Garenamotse competed in the long jump, coming fifth. Genevieve Obone, Marie-Jeanne Binga, Stellan Ndibi and Wilfred Bigangoye entered the 100 metres races but did not start.

== Medal summary ==
Gabon won a single silver medal, and was ranked joint twenty ninth in the final medal table alongside Gambia.

=== Medal table ===
Sport	Gold	Silver	Bronze	Total
Judo	0	1	0	1
Total	0	1	0	1

== List of Medalists ==
=== Silver Medal ===
Medal	Name	Sport	Event	Date	Ref
Silver	Melanie Engaong	Judo	Women's Under 78 kg	16 October 2003	
