= Lesotho at the 2003 All-Africa Games =

- IOC code: LES
- NOC: Lesotho National Olympic Committee

in Abuja 5 October 2003 – 17 October 2003
- Medals Ranked 16th: Gold 2 Silver 1 Bronze 3 Total 6

All-Africa Games appearances
- 1991; 1995; 1999; 2003; 2007; 2011; 2015; 2019; 2023

Lesotho competed in the 2003 All-Africa Games held at the National Stadium in the city of Abuja, Nigeria The country sent a substantial team which entered a range of events including athletics and tennis. The team returned with six medals, all in taekwondo, and came sixteenth in the medal table.

== Competitors ==
The Lesotho entered thirty events, twenty six for men and four for women. The country wielded a strong representation in tennis, with Mokoali Eche, Ntsane Moeletsi, Sekhobe Moshoeshoe and Lebohang Tsasanyane all competing in the men’s singles tournament. Tau Khotso ran in the 10,000 metres. A team also competed in the baseball tournament, coming fourth in the qualifying round and fifth overall.

== Medal summary ==
Lesotho won six medals, two gold, a silver and three bronze medals, and was ranked sixteenth in the final medal table.

=== Medal table ===
Sport	Gold	Silver	Bronze	Total
Taekwondo	2	1	3	6
Total	2	1	3	6

== List of Medalists ==
=== Gold Medal ===
Medal	Name	Sport	Event	Date	Ref
Gold	Lineo Mochesane	Taekwondo	Women's Under 47 kg	15 October 2003	
Gold	Johannes Komane	Taekwondo	Men's Under 62 kg	16 October 2003	

=== Silver Medal ===
Medal	Name	Sport	Event	Date	Ref
Silver	Puleng Lala	Taekwondo	Women's Over 72 kg	18 October 2003	

=== Bronze Medal ===
Medal	Name	Sport	Event	Date	Ref
Bronze	Likeleli Alinah Thamae	Taekwondo	Women’s Under 51 kg	15 October 2003	
Bronze	Letsoela Tatolo	Taekwondo	Men’s Under 67 kg	16 October 2003	
Bronze	Tsoene Mamokoai	Taekwondo	Women’s Under 67 kg	17 October 2003	
