= Hamza Sahli =

Moroccan long-distance runner

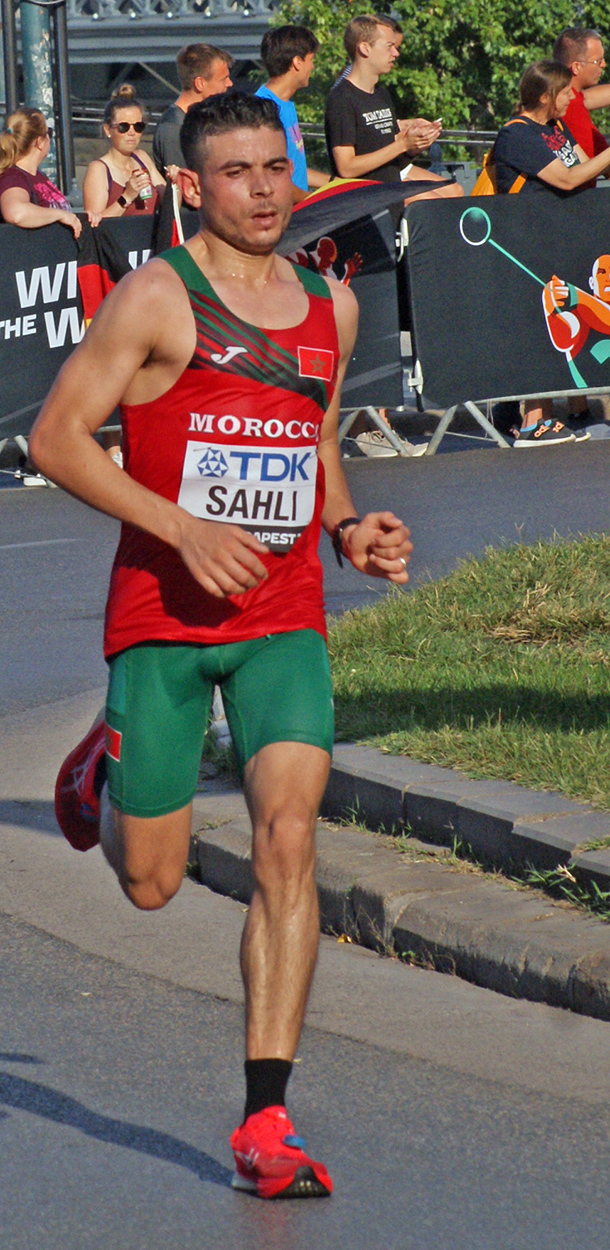

Personal information
- Nationality: Moroccan
- Born: 10 May 1993 (age 33)

Sport
- Sport: Athletics
- Event: Marathon
Medal record
Men's track and field
Representing Morocco
African Games
Bronze medal – third place	2019 Rabat	half marathon

Hamza Sahli (born 10 May 1993) is a Moroccan athlete who specializes in long-distance events. He won a bronze medal in half marathon at the 2019 African Games. Representing Morocco at the 2019 World Athletics Championships, he competed in men's marathon and finished 8th.

Sahli competed in the men's marathon at the 2020 Summer Olympics.
