= Togo at the 2019 African Games =

- Flag of Togo
- IOC code: TOG
- NOC: Comité National Olympique Togolais

in Rabat, Morocco 19 August 2019 – 31 August 2019
- Competitors: 29 (20 men and 9 women) in 9 sports
- Medals Ranked 38th: Gold 0 Silver 0 Bronze 2 Total 2

African Games appearances (overview)
- 1965; 1973; 1978; 1987–1995; 1999; 2003; 2007; 2011; 2015; 2019; 2023

Togo competed at the 2019 African Games held from 19 to 31 August 2019 in Rabat, Morocco. In total, two bronze medals were won, both in fencing, and the country finished 38th in the medal table, shared with Benin and Guinea.

== Medal summary ==
=== Medal table ===
Medal	Name	Sport	Event	Date
Bronze	Women's Foil Team	Fencing	Women's Team Foil	29 August
Bronze	Women's Sabre Team	Fencing	Women's Team Sabre	30 August

Medals by sport
Sport	1st place, gold medalist(s)	2nd place, silver medalist(s)	3rd place, bronze medalist(s)	Total
Fencing	0	0	2	2
Total	0	0	2	2

== Athletics ==
Fabrice Dabla competed in the men's 100 metres and men's 200 metres events. He reached the semifinals in the men's 100 metres event and he did not finish in the heats in the men's 200 metres event.

Juliette Bouley competed in the women's 100 metres and women's 200 metres events. In both events she did not advance to compete in the semifinals.

Judith Koumedzina also competed in the women's 100 metres event and she also did not advance to the semifinals.

Fayza Issaka competed in the women's long jump event. She finished in 10th place.

Prenam Pesse and Lazare Simklina also competed in athletics.

== Boxing ==
Anani Hounkpatin (men's 57 kg) and John Koudeha (men's 75 kg) competed in boxing.

== Fencing ==
Rebecca Adamenou, Charlene Anadi and Francoise Koutoglo competed in fencing. They won the bronze medal in the women's foil team event and the women's sabre team event.

== Judo ==
Two athletes represented Togo in judo.

Athlete	Event	Round of 32	Round of 16	Quarterfinals	Semifinals	Repechage 1	Final / BM	
Athlete	Event	Opposition Result	Opposition Result	Opposition Result	Opposition Result	Opposition Result	Opposition Result	Rank
Frederic Olympio	Men's -66 kg	Kairabi (KEN); L	did not advance					
Joseph Viagbo	Men's -66 kg	Oumar (CHA); L	did not advance					

== Rowing ==
Three athletes competed in rowing: Michel Agbassah, Bonay Agounke and Akoko Komlanvi.

== Swimming ==
Two swimmers represented Togo in swimming: Emeric Kpegba and Mawupemon Otogbe.

== Table tennis ==
Togo competed in table tennis.

== Taekwondo ==
Two athletes competed in Taekwondo.

Athlete	Event	Round of 32	Round of 16	Quarterfinals	Semifinals	Final	
Athlete	Event	Opposition Result	Opposition Result	Opposition Result	Opposition Result	Opposition Result	Rank
Abdoul-rahamane Oumarou	Men's –63 kg	—N/a	Kabore (BUR); L 2–33	did not advance			
Hippolyte Ezian	Men's –80 kg	—N/a	Sawadogo (BUR); L 2–29	did not advance			

== Tennis ==
Bernard Alipoe-Tchotchodji and Charles Alipoe-Tchotchodji competed in tennis in the men's singles and men's doubles events.

In the men's singles event Bernard did not advance to the next round and Charles advanced to the next round where he was eliminated by Takanyi Garanganga.

In the men's doubles event they advanced to the next round where they were eliminated by Adam Moundir and Lamine Ouahab.
