= Gambia at the 2003 All-Africa Games =

The Gambia at the 2003 All-Africa Games
- IOC code: GAM
- NOC: The Gambia National Olympic Committee

in Abuja 5 October 2003 – 17 October 2003
- Medals Ranked 23rd: Gold 0 Silver 1 Bronze 0 Total 1

All-Africa Games appearances
- 2003; 2007; 2011; 2015; 2019; 2023

The Gambia competed in the 2003 All-Africa Games held at the National Stadium in the city of Abuja, Nigeria. The team consisted of a single competitor, Gibril Jatta, who went on to win a silver medal in the taekwondo tournament.

== Competitors ==
The Gambia entered a single event.

=== Medal table ===
Sport	Gold	Silver	Bronze	Total
Taekwondo	0	1	0	1
Total	0	1	0	1

== Medal summary ==
The Gambia won a single silver medal, and was ranked joint twenty ninth in the final medal table alongside Gabon.

== List of Medalists ==
=== Silver Medal ===
Medal	Name	Sport	Event	Date	Ref
Silver	Gibril Jatta	Taekwondo	Men's Under 67 kg	16 October 2003	
