= Lesotho at the 2019 African Games =

- Flag of Lesotho
- IOC code: LES
- NOC: Lesotho National Olympic Committee

in Rabat, Morocco 19 August 2019 – 31 August 2019
- Competitors: 27 (19 men and 8 women) in 7 sports
- Medals Ranked 34th: Gold 0 Silver 1 Bronze 0 Total 1

African Games appearances
- 1991; 1995; 1999; 2003; 2007; 2011; 2015; 2019; 2023

Lesotho competed at the 2019 African Games held from 19 to 31 August 2019 in Rabat, Morocco. In total, 27 athletes represented the country in seven sports. They won one silver medal and the country finished 34th in the medal table.

== Medal summary ==
=== Medal table ===
Medal	Name	Sport	Event	Date
Silver	Michelle Tau	Taekwondo	Women's -46 kg	21 August

Medals by sport
Sport	1st place, gold medalist(s)	2nd place, silver medalist(s)	3rd place, bronze medalist(s)	Total
Taekwondo	0	1	0	1
Total	0	1	0	1

== Athletics ==
In total eight athletes were scheduled to represent Lesotho in athletics.

Mosito Lehata and Phomolo Lekhoana competed in the men's 100 metres and men's 200 metres events.

Mamakoli Senauoane competed in the women's 400 metres event. She did not qualify to compete in the semifinals.

Tsepang Sello competed in the women's 800 metres event. She was also scheduled to compete in the women's 1500 metres event but she did not start.

Mokulubete Makatisi was scheduled to compete in the women's 1500 metres event but she did not start.

Lerato Sechele competed in the women's triple jump event. She finished in 5th place. She was also scheduled to compete in the women's long jump but she did not start.

Jobo Khatoane was scheduled to compete in the men's half marathon event but he did not start.

Toka Badboy was scheduled to compete in the men's 10,000 metres event but he did not start.

== Boxing ==
Tlholohelo Mokhesi, Moroke Mokhotho, Qhobosheane Mohlerepe, Mokhachane Moshoeshoe and Arena Pakela competed in boxing.

== Cycling ==
Teboho Khantsi competed in the Men's individual time trial road cycling event. He finished in 37th place out of 40 competitors with a time of 1:00:14.106.

Tumelo Makae and Phetetso Monese competed in the Men's Cross-country and Men's Cross-country marathon events.

== Taekwondo ==
Michelle Tau, Tebello Mootisa, Rethabile Tjotjo, Marumo Moloisane, Ramosoeu Nkuebe and Lemohang Mokhobo competed in Taekwondo. Michelle Tau won the bronze medal in the Women's -46 kg event.

== Tennis ==
Nyathi Motloyoa and Mpaleng Sempe competed in tennis in the men's singles and men's doubles events.

== Weightlifting ==
Thapelo Sebota, Makoena Tsosane and Machachamise Ntsinyi competed in weightlifting.
