= South Sudan at the 2019 African Games =

- Flag of South Sudan

in Rabat, Morocco 19 August 2019 – 31 August 2019
- Competitors: 29 (25 men and 4 women) in 4 sports
- Medals: Gold 0 Silver 0 Bronze 0 Total 0

African Games appearances
- 2011; 2015; 2019; 2023

South Sudan competed at the 2019 African Games held from 19 to 31 August 2019 in Rabat, Morocco.

== Athletics ==
South Sudan competed in athletics.

Lucia Lucia competed in the women's 100 metres and women's 200 metres events.

Akoon Akoon competed in the men's 400 metres and men's 400 metres hurdles events.

Stella Stella competed in the women's 800 metres event. She finished in 20th place in the heats.

Kulang Kulang competed in the men's 5000 metres event. He finished in 24th place.

Ngor Ngor competed in the men's half marathon event. He finished in 15th place.

== Boxing ==
South Sudan competed in boxing.

== Karate ==
Five athletes were scheduled to represent South Sudan in karate but none competed in an event.

== Taekwondo ==
In total, seven athletes were scheduled to represent South Sudan in Taekwondo.

Rose Ajok competed in the Women's -53 kg event. She was eliminated in the preliminary round.

Malang Malang competed in the Men's -54 kg event. He was also eliminated in the preliminary round.
