= Eswatini at the 2019 African Games =

- Flag of Eswatini
- IOC code: SWZ
- NOC: Eswatini Olympic and Commonwealth Games Association

in Rabat, Morocco 19 August 2019 – 31 August 2019
- Competitors: 5 (4 men and 1 woman) in 2 sports and 7 events
- Medals: Gold 0 Silver 0 Bronze 0 Total 0

African Games appearances
- 1973; 1978; 1987; 1991; 1995; 1999; 2003–2007; 2011; 2015; 2019; 2023

Eswatini competed at the 2019 African Games held from 19 to 31 August 2019 in Rabat, Morocco. The country competed in two sports, athletics and Taekwondo, and did not win any medals.

== Athletics ==
Sibusiso Matsenjwa competed in the men's 100 metres and men's 200 metres events. He reached the semi-finals in the 100 metres event and the finals in the 200 metres event. In the 200 metres event he finished in 5th place with a time of 20.83.

Andile Lusenga competed in the men's 200 metres event and the men's 400 metres events. He reached the semi-finals in both events.

Phumlile Sibonakele Ndzinisa competed in the women's 100 metres and women's 200 metres events. She also reached the semi-finals in both events.

== Taekwondo ==
Two athletes competed in Taekwondo.

Athlete	Event	Round of 32	Round of 16	Quarterfinals	Semifinals	Final	
Athlete	Event	Opposition Result	Opposition Result	Opposition Result	Opposition Result	Opposition Result	Rank
Wandile Maziya	Men's –58 kg	Bye	Vincente (CPV); L 8–11	did not advance			
Thandukukhanya Njabulo Dlamini	Men's –63 kg	Bye	Fernandes (CPV); L 12–17	did not advance			
