= Togo at the 2007 All-Africa Games =

- IOC code: TOG
- NOC: Comité National Olympique Togolais

in Algiers 11 July 2007 – 23 July 2007
- Medals: Gold 0 Silver 1 Bronze 0 Total 1

All-Africa Games appearances
- 1965; 1973; 1978; 1987–1995; 1999; 2003; 2007; 2011; 2015; 2019; 2023

Togo competed in the 2007 All-Africa Games held at the Stade du 5 Juillet in the city of Algiers, Algeria. The country received a single silver medal in the women's hammer throw with Florence Ezeh achieving a throw of 59.55 metres (195 ft 4 in). This was originally a bronze medal but was upgraded when second place Funke Adeoye failed a dope test.

== Medal summary ==
Togo won a silver at the games, achieved in the Women's hammer throw. The event was held on 27 July. Florence Ezeh came third to Marwa Ahmed Hussein Arafat of Egypt and Funke Adeoye of Nigeria with a medal winning distance of 59.55 metres (195 ft 4 in). Subsequently, Adeoye failed a dope test and was disqualified so Ezeh was awarded the silver medal.

== List of Medalists ==
=== Medal table ===
Sport	Gold	Silver	Bronze	Total
Athletics	0	1	0	1
Total	0	1	0	1

=== Silver Medal ===
Medal	Name	Sport	Event	Date	Ref
Silver	Florence Ezeh	Athletics	Women's hammer throw	21 July 2007	

== See also ==
- Togo at the African Games
