= Tiffany Keep =

South African cyclist (born 2000)

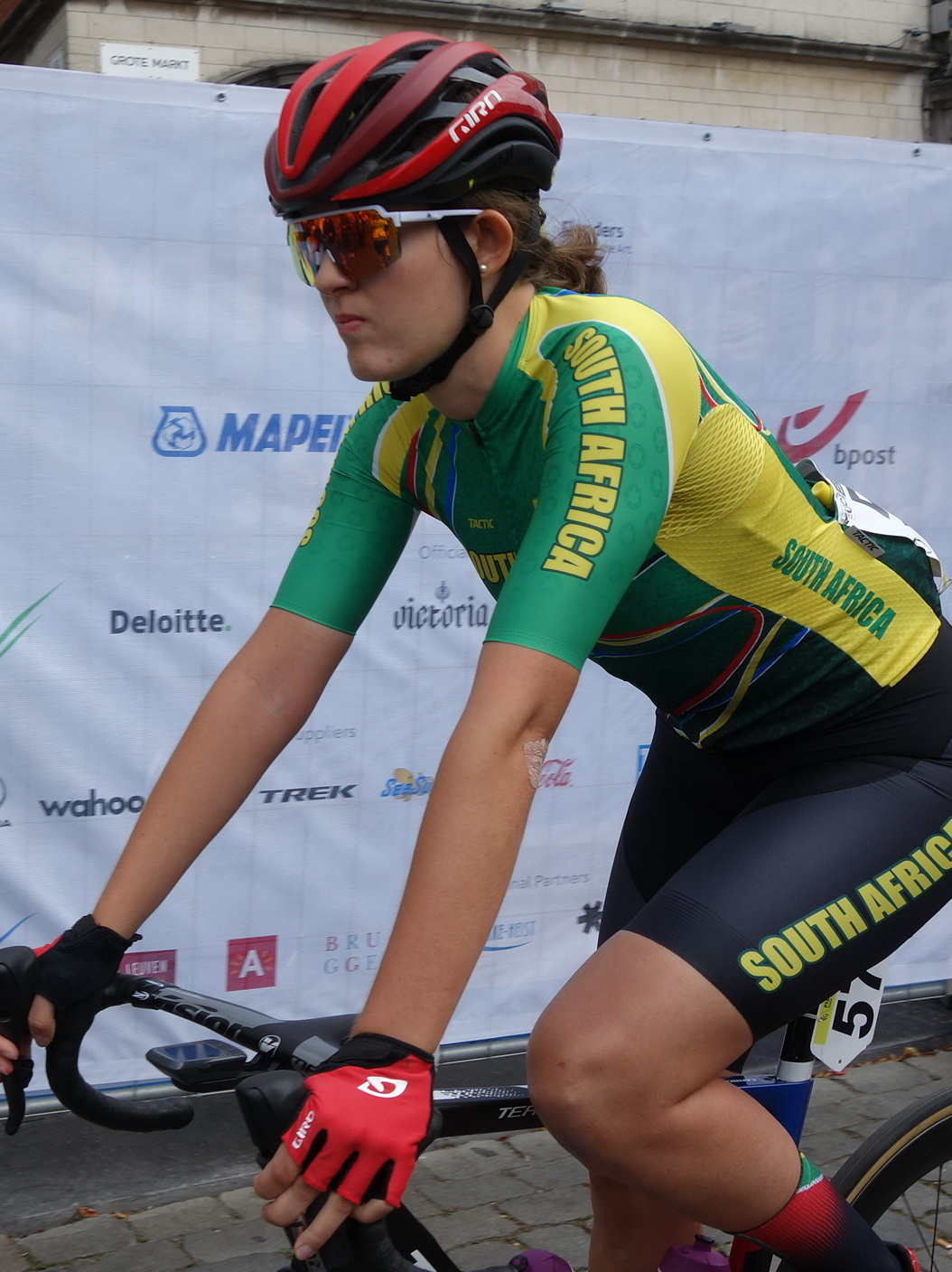
- Tiffany Keep at the 2021 UCI Road World Championships

Personal information
- Born: 15 October 2000 (age 26)

Cycling career
- Sport: Cycling
- Role: Rider

Tiffany Keep (born 15 October 2000) is a South African professional racing cyclist. She rode in the women's road race at the 2019 UCI Road World Championships in Yorkshire, England. She competed at the 2019 African Games and she won the gold medal in the women's mountain bike cross-country Olympic event. She was also part of the team that won the gold medal in the women's team road time trial event.
