= Central African Republic at the 2019 African Games =

- Flag of the Central African Republic
- IOC code: CAF
- NOC: Comité National Olympique et Sportif Centrafricain

in Rabat, Morocco 19 August 2019 – 31 August 2019
- Competitors: 17 (10 men and 7 women) in 7 sports
- Medals Ranked 41st: Gold 0 Silver 0 Bronze 1 Total 1

African Games appearances
- 1965; 1973; 1978; 1987; 1991; 1995; 1999; 2003; 2007; 2011; 2015; 2019; 2023

Central African Republic competed at the 2019 African Games held from 19 to 31 August 2019 in Rabat, Morocco. In total, athletes representing the country won one medal: Gildas Bangana won the bronze medal in the men's super lightweight boxing event. The country finished last in the medal table, in 41st place, shared with Cape Verde.

== Medal summary ==
=== Medal table ===
Medal	Name	Sport	Event	Date
Bronze	Gildas Bangana	Boxing	Men's super lightweight (63kg)	28 August

Medals by sport
Sport	1st place, gold medalist(s)	2nd place, silver medalist(s)	3rd place, bronze medalist(s)	Total
Boxing	0	0	1	1
Total	0	0	1	1

== Athletics ==
Two athletes represented Central African Republic in athletics.

Francky-Edgard Mbotto competed in the men's 800 metres event. He competed in one of the heats and did not finish.

Jemina Robinei was scheduled to compete in the women's 100 metres and women's 200 metres events but she did not start in either event.

== Boxing ==
Four athletes were scheduled to compete in boxing: Gildas Bangana (men's 63kg), Davy Bogba (men's 69kg), Amondine Ndarata (women's 57kg) and Nadege Niambongui (women's 60kg).

Bogba did not compete in his event.

Bangana won the bronze medal in the men's super lightweight (63kg) event.

Ndarata lost her match against Jalia Nali (representing Uganda).

Niambongui was disqualified in her match against Deedra Arvella Chestnut (representing Sierra Leone).

== Chess ==
Four chess players competed: Kourakoumba Florent Desire, Koualet Bebondji Vainney Archeveque, Gamba Merveille Gloria Dan and Daher Khater Rochana.

== Judo ==
Two athletes represented Central African Republic in judo: Hardi Malot and Loric Syssa-Magale Lagarrigue.

== Swimming ==
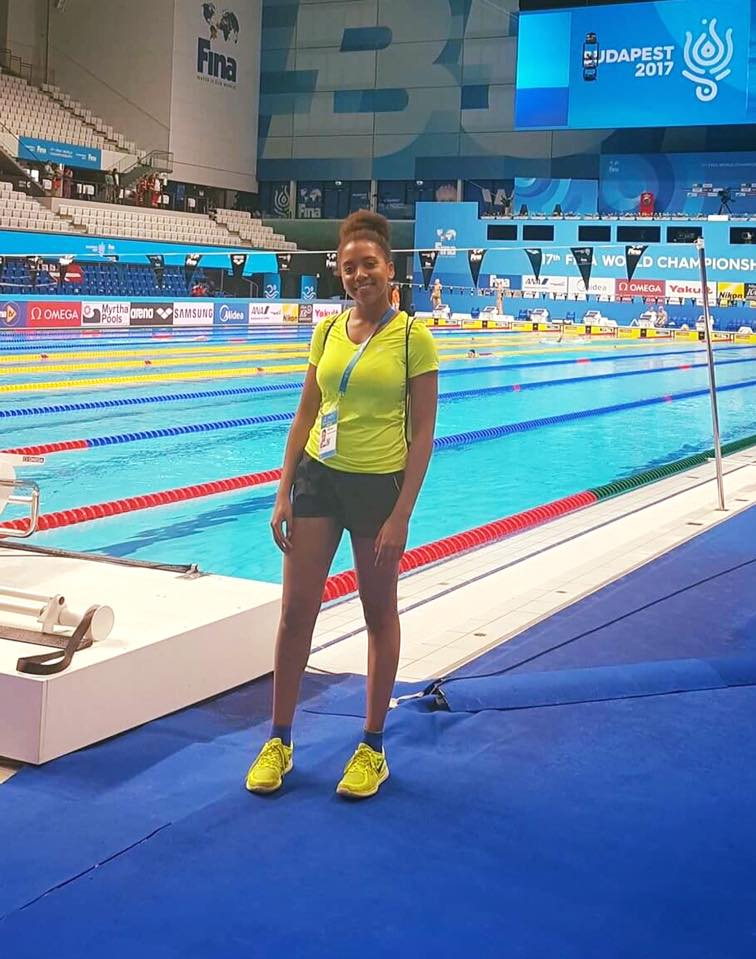
Chloe Sauvourel (2017)

Chloe Sauvourel was the only swimmer to represent the country in the sport.

Athlete	Event	Heat		Final	
Athlete	Event	Time	Rank	Time	Rank
Chloe Sauvourel	50 metres freestyle	32.65	29	did not advance	
Chloe Sauvourel	100 metres freestyle	1:13.67	19	did not advance	

== Taekwondo ==
Sadia Kembi (women's –46 kg), Philippe Balanga (men's –74 kg) and Jefferson Gbafio (men's –87 kg) competed in Taekwondo.

== Wrestling ==
Mansour Idriss was scheduled to compete in the men's freestyle 74 kg event but he did not compete in the event.
