= Cape Verde at the 2003 All-Africa Games =

- IOC code: CPV
- NOC: Comité Olímpico Caboverdeano

in Abuja 5 October 2003 – 17 October 2003
- Medals: Gold 1 Silver 0 Bronze 0 Total 1

All-Africa Games appearances
- 1999; 2003; 2007; 2011; 2015; 2019; 2023

Youth appearances
- 2010; 2014

Cape Verde competed in the 2003 All-Africa Games held at the National Stadium in the city of Abuja, Nigeria. The country participated with a diverse delegation, including four Taekwondo athletes, one boxer, a soccer team, one long-distance runner, and one sprinter. Of these, only a Taekwondo athlete achieved the distinction of winning a gold medal. This achievement represented the nation's first gold medal in the history of the Africa Games.

== Competitors ==
The 2003 All-Africa Games were held in Nigeria. Events took place at the National Stadium constructed in the city of Abuja for the event. Cape Verde sent a diverse delegation, including four Taekwondo athletes, one boxer, a soccer team, one long-distance runner, and one sprinter. Of these, only a Taekwondo athlete, 21-year old Fredson Gomes, achieved the distinction of winning a gold medal. This achievement represented the nation's first gold medal in the games. He entered the men's welterweight in Taekwondo, which was held on 17 October.

== Medal summary ==
Cape Verde won a gold medal. It was their first in the history of the games.

=== Medal table ===
Sport	Gold	Silver	Bronze	Total
Taekwondo	1	0	0	1
Total	1	0	0	1

== List of Medalists ==
=== Gold Medal ===
Medal	Name	Sport	Event	Date	Ref
Gold	Fredson Gomes	Taekwondo	Welterweight (under 78 kg)	17 October 2003	
