= Togo at the African Games =

- IOC code: TOG
- NOC: Comité National Olympique Togolais
- Medals: Gold 0 Silver 5 Bronze 13 Total 18

African Games appearances (overview)
- 1965; 1973; 1978; 1987–1995; 1999; 2003; 2007; 2011; 2015; 2019; 2023

Togo (TOG) has competed in the nine African Games since taking part in the inaugural Games in 1965. Athletes from Togo have won a total of eighteen medals.

== Medal tables ==
=== Medals by Games ===
Below is a table representing all Togolese medals won at the Games. The original count at the 2007 event was a single bronze medal but Florence Ezeh's award was subsequently raised to a silver medal due to a competitor being disqualified.

Games	Athletes	Gold	Silver	Bronze	Total	Rank
1965 Brazzaville		0	0	2	2	18
1973 Lagos		0	0	1	1	23
1978 Algiers		0	1	4	5	17
1999 Johannesburg		0	1	0	1	25
2003 Abuja		0	0	3	3	31
2007 Algiers		0	1	0	1	32
2011 Maputo		0	0	1	1	34
2015 Brazzaville		0	2	0	2	32
2019 Rabat		0	0	2	2	38
Total		0	5	13	18	46

== See also ==
- Togo at the Olympics
- Togo at the Paralympics
- Sport in Togo
