= 2003 All-Africa Games =

Multi-sport event in Abuja, Nigeria

VIII All-Africa Games
- Host city: Abuja, Nigeria
- Nations: 53
- Events: 22 sports
- Opening: 5 October 2003
- Closing: 17 October 2003
- Opened by: Olusegun Obasanjo
- Main venue: Abuja Stadium
- Website: 8ALLAFRICAGAMES.org

The 8th All Africa Games, also known as Abuja 2003, were held from 5–17 October 2003 in Abuja, Nigeria. 53 countries participated in 23 sports. The main venue was the newly constructed Abuja Stadium. The organizing committee was headed by Nigerian Amos Adamu.

== Venues ==
List of Venues:

- National Stadium – Athletics, Football (finals), Para sports
- Main Gymnasium, ASC – Gymnastics, Handball, Judo, Karate, Para sports
- Racket Squash Courts (ASC) – Squash
- Main Swimming Pool – Swimming, Para sports
- Gymnasium (ASC) – Taekwondo
- Main Sports Hall (ASC) – Volleyball, Para sports
- Ladi Kwali Hall, Sheraton, Abuja – Badminton, Para sports, Wrestling
- Old Parade Ground – Baseball, Softball
- Scorpion Sports Hall, Guards Brigade – Basketball
- International Conference Centre – Boxing
- Agura Hotel – Chess
- Roads – Cycling
- Lagos – Football
- Kaduna – Football
- Bauchi – Football
- Calabar – Football
- Hockey Stadium, Hockey Training Pitch – Hockey
- Yakubu Gowon Barracks – Squash
- Congress Hall, Hilton – Table tennis
- National Centre for Women's Development – Weightlifting, Para sports

== Participating nations ==
Among the countries that participated at the 2003 All Africa Games were:

- Algeria
- Angola
- Benin
- Botswana
- Burkina Faso
- Cameroon
- Cape Verde
- Central African Republic
- Republic of the Congo
- Ivory Coast
- (Democratic Republic of the Congo) DR Congo
- Egypt
- Ethiopia
- Gabon
- The Gambia
- Ghana
- Guinea
- Kenya
- Lesotho
- Libya
- Madagascar
- Mali
- Mauritius
- Namibia
- Niger
- Nigeria
- Senegal
- South Africa
- Seychelles
- São Tomé and Príncipe
- Sierra Leone
- Sudan
- Tanzania
- Togo
- Tunisia
- Uganda
- Zambia
- Zimbabwe

== Sports ==
22 disciplines were contested at the 2003 All Africa Games, among them:

- Athletics
- Badminton
- Baseball
- Basketball
- Boxing
- Chess
- Cycling
- Field hockey
- Football
- Gymnastics
- Handball
- Judo
- Karate
- Softball
- Squash
- Swimming
- Table tennis
- Tennis
- Taekwondo
- Volleyball
- Weightlifting
- Wrestling
- Special Sports:
- Para-athletics
- Powerlifting
- Para table tennis

== Medal standings ==
* Host nation (Nigeria)

Rank	Nation	Gold	Silver	Bronze	Total
1	Nigeria (NGR)*	85	90	65	240
2	Egypt (EGY)	80	62	72	214
3	South Africa (RSA)	63	59	49	171
4	Algeria (ALG)	32	24	31	87
5	Tunisia (TUN)	30	29	30	89
6	Cameroon (CMR)	8	4	23	35
7	Senegal (SEN)	6	9	19	34
8	Ethiopia (ETH)	5	8	7	20
9	Kenya (KEN)	5	5	4	14
10	Ghana (GHA)	4	5	16	25
11	Botswana (BOT)	4	1	6	11
12	Angola (ANG)	3	3	7	13
13	Madagascar (MAD)	3	0	3	6
14	Libya (LBA)	2	3	5	10
15	Zimbabwe (ZIM)	2	3	2	7
16	Lesotho (LES)	2	1	3	6
17	Ivory Coast (CIV)	1	1	7	9
18	Tanzania (TAN)	1	0	1	2
19	Cape Verde (CPV)	1	0	0	1
19	Central African Republic (CAF)	1	0	0	1
21	Seychelles (SEY)	0	10	6	16
22	Namibia (NAM)	0	3	4	7
23	Mali (MLI)	0	1	5	6
23	Republic of the Congo (CGO)	0	1	5	6
23	Zambia (ZAM)	0	1	5	6
26	Uganda (UGA)	0	1	4	5
27	Benin (BEN)	0	1	2	3
28	Democratic Republic of the Congo (COD)	0	1	1	2
29	Gabon (GAB)	0	1	0	1
29	The Gambia (GAM)	0	1	0	1
31	Burkina Faso (BUR)	0	0	3	3
31	Mauritius (MRI)	0	0	3	3
31	Niger (NIG)	0	0	3	3
31	Togo (TOG)	0	0	3	3
35	Sudan (SUD)	0	0	2	2
36	Guinea (GUI)	0	0	1	1
36	Sierra Leone (SLE)	0	0	1	1
Totals (37 entries)		338	328	398	1,064
