= The Gambia at the 2023 African Games =

- Flag of the Gambia
- IOC code: GAM
- NOC: The Gambia National Olympic Committee

in Accra, Ghana 8 March 2024 – 23 March 2024
- Medals Ranked 21st: Gold 2 Silver 0 Bronze 0 Total 2

African Games appearances
- 2003; 2007; 2011; 2015; 2019; 2023

The Gambia competed at the 2023 African Games held from 8 to 23 March 2024 in Accra, Ghana. The Gambia competed in 8 sports.

== Medal table ==
Medal	Name	Sport	Event	Date
Gold	Gina Bass	Athletics	Women's 100 metres	19 March
Gold	Gina Bass	Athletics	Women's 200 metres	22 March
