= Bellore Sangala =

Republic of the Congo swimmer

Personal information
- Born: January 2, 1995 (age 31)

Sport
- Sport: Swimming

Stefan Bellore Sangala (born January 2, 1995) is a swimmer from the Republic of the Congo. She competed at the 2016 Summer Olympics in the women's 50 metre freestyle race; her time of 33.71 seconds in the heats did not qualify her for the semifinals.

She also represented Republic of the Congo at the 2019 African Games and she competed in the women's 50 metre breaststroke and women's 50 metre freestyle events. In both events she did not qualify to compete in the final.

In 2021, she competed in the women's 50 metre freestyle event at the 2020 Summer Olympics held in Tokyo, Japan.
