= Benin at the 2019 African Games =

- Flag of Benin
- IOC code: BEN
- NOC: Benin National Olympic and Sports Committee

in Rabat, Morocco 19 August 2019 – 31 August 2019
- Competitors: 24 (15 men and 9 women) in 11 sports
- Medals Ranked 38th: Gold 0 Silver 0 Bronze 2 Total 2

African Games appearances
- 1965; 1973; 1978–1995; 1999; 2003; 2007; 2011; 2015; 2019; 2023

Benin competed at the 2019 African Games held from 19 to 31 August 2019 in Rabat, Morocco. In total, athletes representing the country won two bronze medals and the country finished in 38th place in the overall medals table, shared with Guinea and Togo.

== Medal summary ==
=== Medal table ===
Medal	Name	Sport	Event	Date
Bronze	Oceanne Mylene Ganiero	Karate	Women's -55 kg	26 August
Bronze	Romeo N'tia	Athletics	Men's long jump	30 August

Medals by sport
Sport	1st place, gold medalist(s)	2nd place, silver medalist(s)	3rd place, bronze medalist(s)	Total
Athletics	0	0	1	1
Karate	0	0	1	1
Total	0	0	2	2

== Archery ==
Zinsou Kpetchehoue Merveille Santi competed in archery in the women's individual recurve event. She finished in 17th place.

== Athletics ==
Souliath Saka, Noelie Yarigo, Odile Ahouanwanou and Romeo N'tia competed in athletics.

Romeo N'tia won the bronze medal in the men's long jump event.

Saka competed in the women's 200 metres and women's 400 metres events. In the 200 metres event she advanced to compete in the semifinals. In the 400 metres event she did not qualify to compete in the semifinals.

Ahouanwanou competed in the women's 100 metres hurdles, women's high jump and women's shot put events. In the 100 metres hurdles event she did not advance to compete in the final.

Yarigo competed in the women's 800 metres event and she finished in 7th place.

== Badminton ==
Benin competed in badminton with two players. Roman Nouman Aremou Bastien Razaki competed in the men's singles event and Yenoukounme Pascaline L. Vitou competed in the women's singles event.

== Cycling ==
Six cyclists representing Benin in road cycling events. They competed in the men's road race, men's individual time trial and men's team time trial.

== Judo ==
Celtus Williams Abiola Dossou-Yovo competed in the Men's -90 kg event.

== Karate ==
Oceanne Mylene Ganiero competed in karate. She won the bronze medal in the women's -55 kg event.

== Rowing ==
Privel Meril Hinkati competed in rowing. He competed in the men's single sculls 500 metres event.

== Swimming ==
Nafissath Radji competed in swimming. She competed in the women's 50 metre backstroke and 50 metre freestyle events.

== Taekwondo ==
One athlete competed in Taekwondo.

Athlete	Event	Round of 32	Round of 16	Quarterfinals	Semifinals	Final	
Athlete	Event	Opposition Result	Opposition Result	Opposition Result	Opposition Result	Opposition Result	Rank
Jehudiel Finagnon Kiki	Men's –68 kg	Bye	Elwafi (LBA); W 6–3	Kobenan (CIV); L 16–20	did not advance		

== Tennis ==
Alexis Klégou and Sylvestre Monnou competed in tennis. They competed in the men's singles and men's doubles events. They did not win a medal.
