= Lesotho at the 2023 African Games =

- Flag of Lesotho
- IOC code: LES
- NOC: Lesotho National Olympic Committee

in Accra, Ghana 8 March 2024 – 23 March 2024
- Competitors: 8 in 4 sports
- Medals Ranked 41st: Gold 0 Silver 0 Bronze 1 Total 1

African Games appearances
- 1991; 1995; 1999; 2003; 2007; 2011; 2015; 2019; 2023

Lesotho competed at the 2023 African Games held from 8 to 23 March 2024 in Accra, Ghana. Lesotho competed in 4 sports.

== Medal table ==
Medal	Name	Sport	Event	Date
Bronze	Michelle Tau	Taekwondo	Women's −46 kg	20 March
