= Atalena Loliha =

South Sudanese athlete (born 1997)

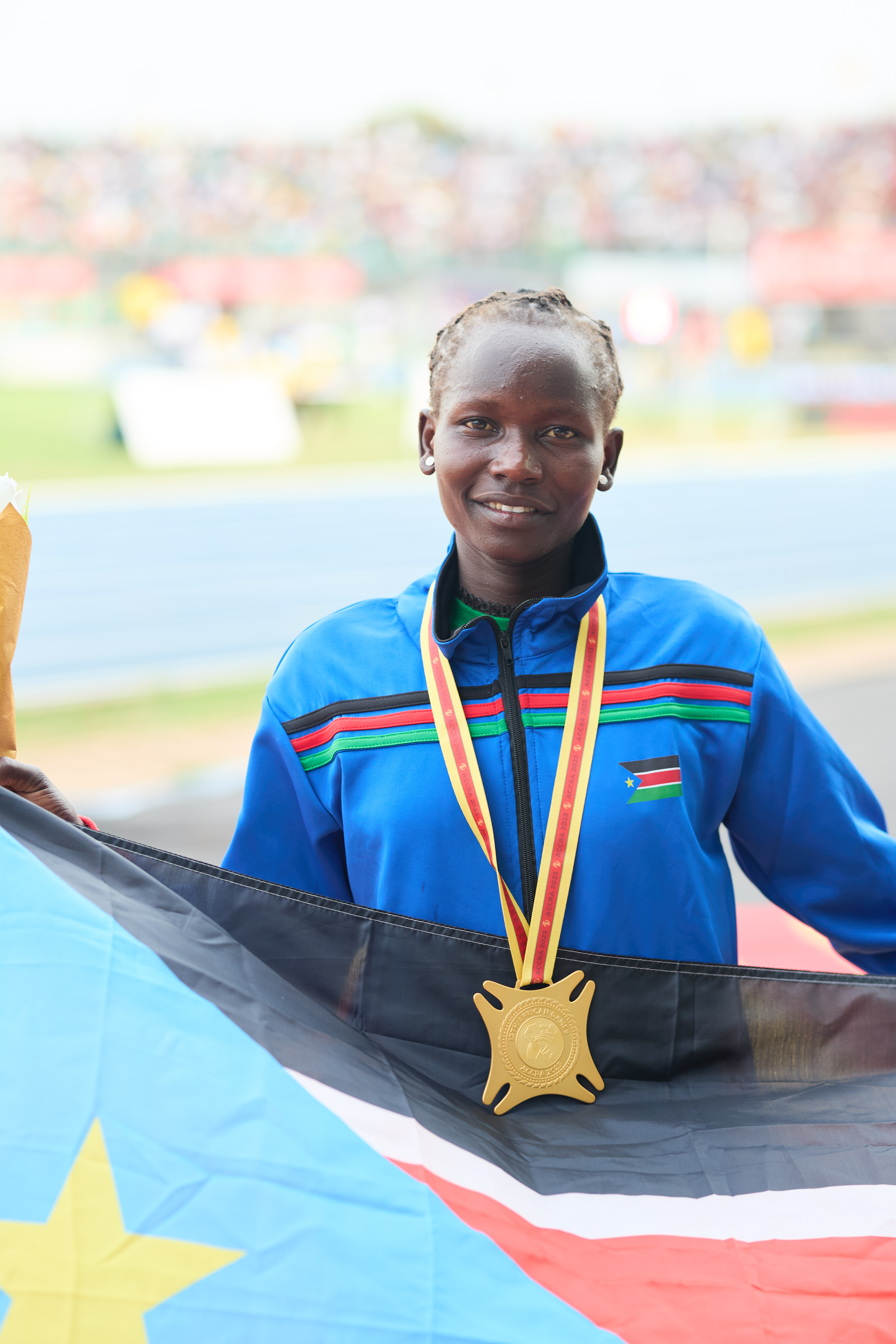

Personal information
- Born: February 1, 1997 (age 29)

Sport
- Country: South Sudan
- Event: Half marathon

Atalena Napule Gaspore Loliha (February 1, 1997) is a South Sudanese long-distance runner.

Loliha was a former member of the Athlete Refugee Team for the 2022 World Athletics Championships, but she did not compete.

She achieved her first international success by placing third in the women's half marathon in Dodoma in 2023.

She won the gold medal in the women's half marathon in the 2023 African Games in Accra, Ghana, becoming the first gold medalist at the African Games from South Sudan. She completed the 21 km race in 1 hour, 14 minutes, and 36 seconds.

Marathon results
Date	Competition	Time	Result
2025, September 14	World Athletics Championships 2025	2:38:18	36
2025, May 31	Stockholm Marathon 2025	2:33:22	3
2024, August 18	CRDB Marathon 2024	2:36:07	20

== See also ==
- Media related to Loliha Atalena at Wikimedia Commons
