= Bourama Mariko =

Malian judoka (born 1979)

Medal record

Men's judo

All-Africa Games
| Bronze medal – third place | 1999 Johannesburg | 66 kg |

Bourama Mariko (born November 29, 1979) is a Malian judoka.

== Achievements ==
| Year | Tournament | Place | Weight class |
|---|---|---|---|
| 2003 | All-Africa Games | 2nd | Lightweight (73 kg) |
| 2001 | African Judo Championships | 5th | Lightweight (73 kg) |
| 2000 | African Judo Championships | 7th | Half lightweight (66 kg) |
| 1999 | All-Africa Games | 3rd | Half lightweight (66 kg) |
