= Rwanda at the 2019 African Games =

- Flag of Rwanda
- IOC code: RWA
- NOC: Comité National Olympique et Sportif du Rwanda

in Rabat, Morocco 19 August 2019 – 31 August 2019
- Competitors: 11 (8 men and 3 women) in 4 sports and 8 events
- Medals Ranked 37th: Gold 0 Silver 0 Bronze 3 Total 3

African Games appearances
- 1987; 1991–2007; 2011; 2015; 2019; 2023

Rwanda competed at the 2019 African Games held from 19 to 31 August 2019 in Rabat, Morocco. In total, athletes representing Rwanda won three bronze medals and the country finished in 37th place in the medal table.

== Medal summary ==
=== Medal table ===
Medal	Name	Sport	Event	Date
Bronze	Patrick Akumuntu Kavalo; Olivier Ntagengwa	Beach volleyball	Men's tournament	21 August
Bronze	Moise Mugisha	Cycling	Men's Individual Time Trial	26 August
Bronze	Rwanda	Cycling	Men's Team Time Trial	29 August

Medals by sport
Sport	1st place, gold medalist(s)	2nd place, silver medalist(s)	3rd place, bronze medalist(s)	Total
Cycling	0	0	2	2
Beach volleyball	0	0	1	1
Total	0	0	3	3

== Athletics ==
Noel Hitimana and Marthe Yankurije competed in athletics.

Hitimana competed in the men's 10,000 metres event and Yankurije competed in the women's 10,000 metres event.

Hitimana finished in 5th place and Yankurije finished in 8th place.

== Cycling ==
Rwanda competed in both mountain bike and road cycling. Moise Mugisha won the bronze medal in the men's individual time trial. He was also part of the team that won the bronze medal in the men's team time trial.

== Volleyball ==
Rwanda competed in the men's beach volleyball tournament.

Patrick Akumuntu Kavalo and Olivier Ntagengwa won the bronze medal.

Benitha Mukandayisenga and Valentine Munezero competed in the women's beach volleyball tournament. They finished in 8th place.
