= Republic of the Congo at the 2019 African Games =

- Flag of the Republic of the Congo
- IOC code: CGO
- NOC: Comité National Olympique et Sportif Congolais

in Rabat, Morocco 19 August 2019 – 31 August 2019
- Competitors: 37 (22 men and 15 women) in 7 sports
- Medals Ranked 31st: Gold 0 Silver 1 Bronze 3 Total 4

African Games appearances
- 1965; 1973; 1978; 1987; 1991; 1995; 1999; 2003; 2007; 2011; 2015; 2019; 2023

Republic of the Congo competed at the 2019 African Games held from 19 to 31 August 2019 in Rabat, Morocco. In total, athletes representing the country won one silver medal and three bronze medals and the country finished in 31st place in the medal table, shared with Zimbabwe.

== Medal summary ==
=== Medal table ===
Medal	Name	Sport	Event	Date
Silver	Women's team	Karate	Women's Kumite team	26 August
Bronze	Bienatiki Moundzendze Henri Christ; Lignandzi Michel; Idowu Saheed	Table tennis	Men's team	23 August
Bronze	Diabate Pembe Fatoumata	Karate	Women's Kumite -50 kg	26 August
Bronze	Mbouma Mandzo Noelle Therencia	Wrestling	Women's Freestyle -57 kg	29 August

Medals by sport
Sport	1st place, gold medalist(s)	2nd place, silver medalist(s)	3rd place, bronze medalist(s)	Total
Karate	0	1	1	2
Table tennis	0	0	1	1
Wrestling	0	0	1	1
Total	0	1	3	4

== Athletics ==
Ten athletes represented Republic of the Congo in athletics.

Romeo Manzila Mahambou competed in the men's 100 metres and he did not advance to the semifinals.

Natacha Ngoye Akamabi competed in the women's 100 metres and women's 200 metres events. She finished in 5th place in the final of the 100 metres event and also in 5th place in the final of the 200 metres event.

Marcelle Bouele Bondo competed in the women's 400 metres event. She was also scheduled to compete in the women's 100 metres event but she did not start.

== Gymnastics ==
Republic of the Congo competed in gymnastics.

== Karate ==
Republic of the Congo competed in karate and the country finished in 6th place in the karate medal table. Two medals were won: the silver medal in the women's Kumite team event and Diabate Pembe Fatoumata won the bronze medal in the women's Kumite -50 kg event.

== Swimming ==
Dienov Andres Koka and Bellore Sangala competed in swimming.

Men

Athlete	Event	Heat		Final	
Athlete	Event	Time	Rank	Time	Rank
Dienov Andres Koka	100 m butterfly	29.50	2	Did not advance	
Dienov Andres Koka	100 m freestyle	DNS			

Women

Athlete	Event	Heat		Final	
Athlete	Event	Time	Rank	Time	Rank
Bellore Sangala	50 m breaststroke	41.89	4	Did not advance	
Bellore Sangala	50 m freestyle	33.17	6	Did not advance	

== Table tennis ==
Republic of the Congo competed in table tennis and won the bronze medal in the men's team tournament.

== Taekwondo ==
Ebouenet Seno Pissoubi Geoffrey (Men's -58 kg event), Matadi Nkoy Rosny (Men's -63 kg event) and Ngouabi-matingou Emelia R (Women's +73 kg event) competed in Taekwondo.

== Wrestling ==
Two athletes represented Republic of the Congo in wrestling.

Mbouma Mandzo Noelle Therencia competed in the Women's Freestyle -57 kg event and she won the bronze medal. Mambou Arnaud competed in the Men's Freestyle -74 kg event.
