= Jobo Khatoane =

Mosotho long-distance runner

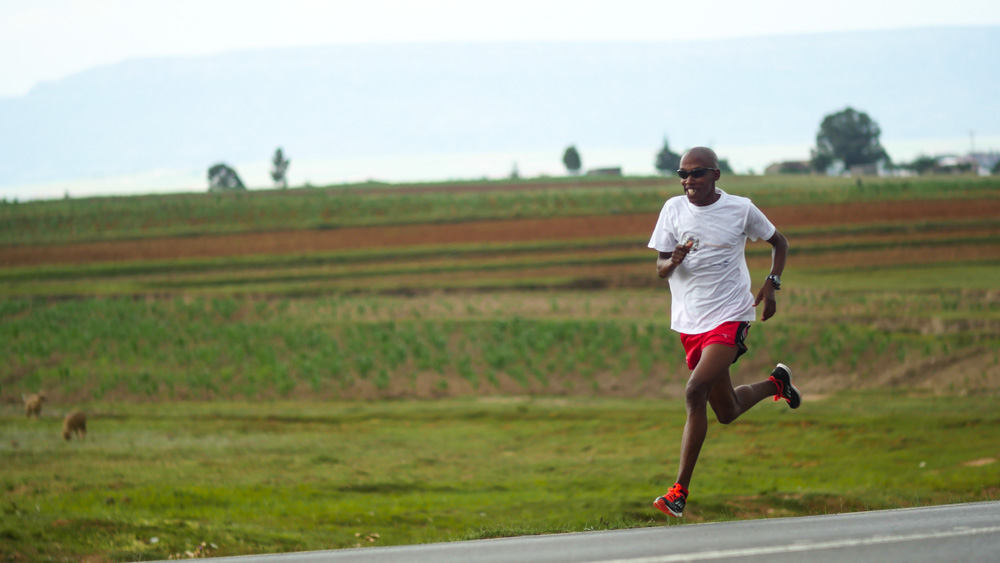
Jobo Khatoane doing hill sprints as part of marathon training in Maseru, Lesotho.

Jobo Khatoane (born June 8, 1991) is a professional Mosotho long-distance runner. He was selected to compete in the marathon at the 2012 London Olympics but had to withdraw before the race due to a pelvis injury.

He was scheduled to compete in the men's half marathon at the 2019 African Games but he did not start.

Khatoane won the Mpumalanga Marathon in 2024, billed as Africa's richest marathon, with a prize money of R1 million. However, he, along with other winners, did not receive any prize money, and criminal charges have been laid against the organiser.

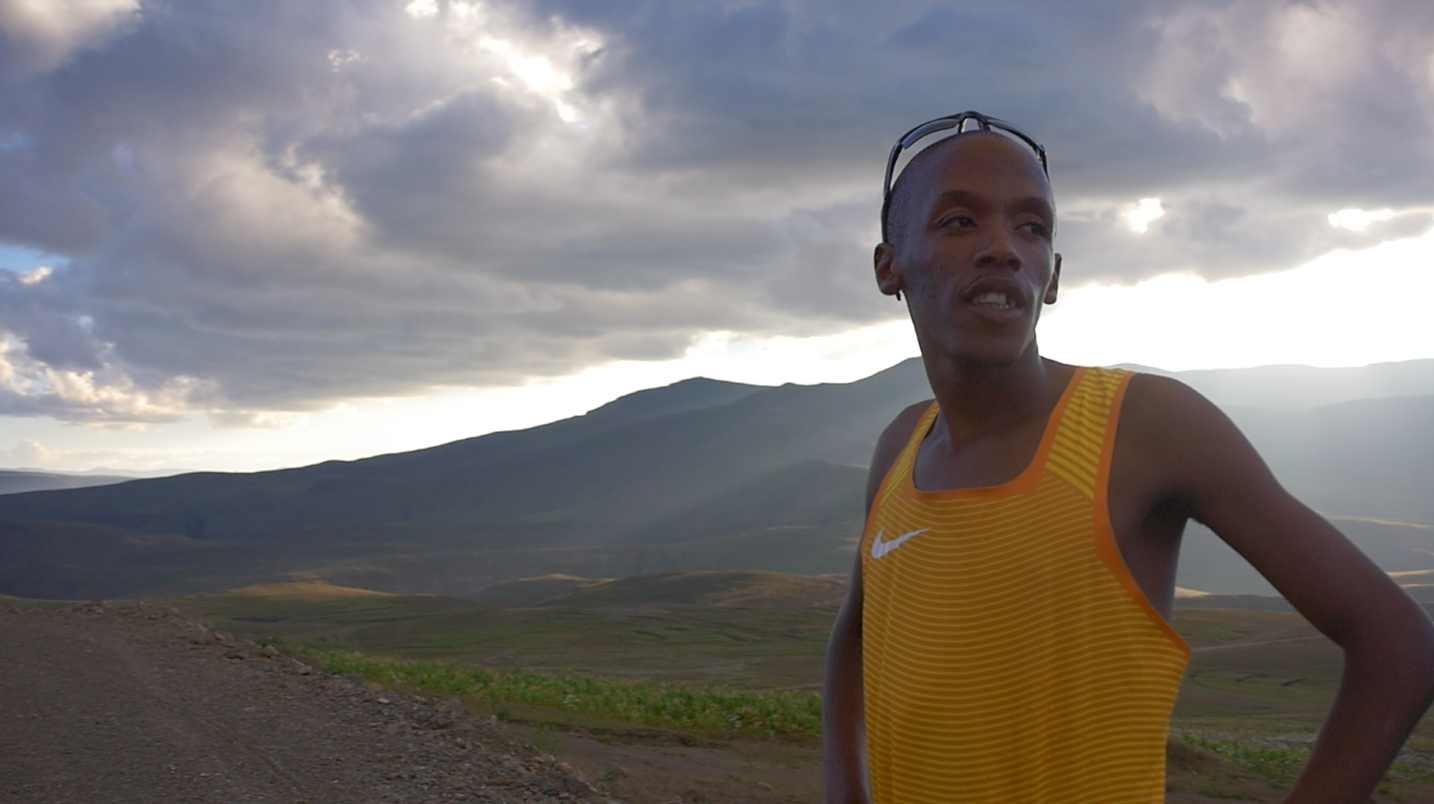
