= South Sudan at the 2023 African Games =

- Flag of South Sudan
- IOC code: SSD
- NOC: South Sudan National Olympic Committee

in Accra, Ghana 8 March 2024 – 23 March 2024
- Competitors: 29 in 4 sports
- Medals Ranked 29th: Gold 1 Silver 0 Bronze 0 Total 1

African Games appearances
- 2011; 2015; 2019; 2023

South Sudan competed at the 2023 African Games held from 8 to 23 March 2024 in Accra, Ghana. South Sudan competed in 4 sports.

== Medal table ==
Medal	Name	Sport	Event	Date
Gold	Atalena Loliha	Athletics	Women's half marathon	22 March
