= Burkina Faso at the 2019 African Games =

- Flag of Burkina Faso
- IOC code: BUR
- NOC: Burkinabé National Olympic and Sports Committee

in Rabat, Morocco 19 August 2019 – 31 August 2019
- Competitors: 97 (75 men and 22 women) in 9 sports
- Medals Ranked 14th: Gold 4 Silver 2 Bronze 2 Total 8

African Games appearances
- 1965; 1973; 1978; 1987; 1991; 1995; 1999; 2003; 2007; 2011; 2015; 2019; 2023

Burkina Faso competed at the 2019 African Games held from 19 to 31 August 2019 in Rabat, Morocco. In total, athletes representing Burkina Faso won four gold medals, two silver medals and two bronze medals and the country finished in 14th place in the medal table.

== Medal summary ==
=== Medal table ===
Medal	Name	Sport	Event	Date
Gold	Hugues Fabrice Zango	Athletics	Men's triple jump	27 August
Gold	Laetitia Bambara	Athletics	Women's hammer throw	27 August
Gold	Men's under-20 football team	Football	Men's tournament	30 August
Gold	Marthe Koala	Athletics	Women's heptathlon	29 August
Silver	Marthe Koala	Athletics	Women's 100 metres hurdles	28 August
Silver	Bienvenu Sawadogo	Athletics	Men's 400 metres hurdles	29 August
Bronze	Passamwinde Faysal Sawadogo	Taekwondo	Men's -80 kg	21 August
Bronze	Gloria Rachel Noela Guissou	Karate	Women's +68 kg	26 August

Medals by sport
Sport	1st place, gold medalist(s)	2nd place, silver medalist(s)	3rd place, bronze medalist(s)	Total
Athletics	3	2	0	5
Football	1	0	0	1
Karate	0	0	1	1
Taekwondo	0	0	1	1
Total	4	2	2	8

== Athletics ==
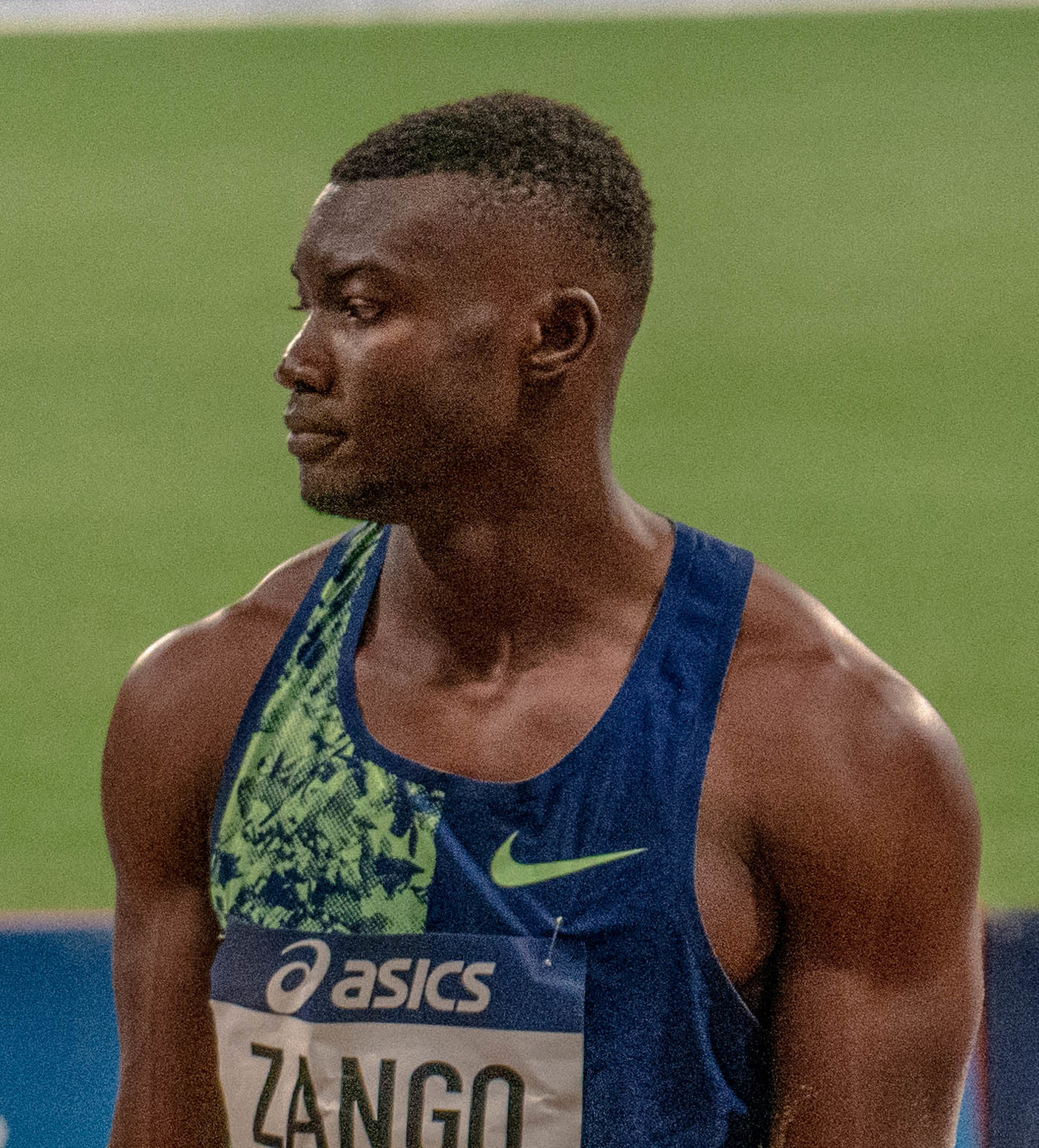
Hugues Fabrice Zango at 2019 Meeting de Paris.

In total, 18 athletes represented Burkina Faso in athletics and three gold medals and two silver medals were won.

Hugues Fabrice Zango won the gold medal in the men's triple jump event.

Lætitia Bambara won the gold medal in the women's hammer throw event.

Marthe Koala won the gold medal in the women's heptathlon event and the silver medal in the women's 100 metres hurdles event.

Bienvenu Sawadogo won the silver medal in the men's 400 metres hurdles event.

== Football ==
Burkina Faso's national under-20 football team competed at the 2019 African Games. They won the gold medal in the men's tournament and Djibril Ouattara was among the top scorers in the tournament.

== Handball ==
Burkina Faso competed in handball in the men's tournament. The team finished in 9th place.

== Judo ==
Seven athletes were registered to represent Burkina Faso in judo but only five competed in their events.

== Karate ==
Burkina Faso competed in karate.

Gloria Rachel Noela Guissou won the bronze medal in the women's +68 kg event.

== Swimming ==
Adama Ouedraogo, Angelika Sita Ouedraogo and Tindwende Sawadogo competed in swimming.

== Taekwondo ==
Teedanogo Pouniir Sawadogo, Wendaabo Levis Tresor Kabore, Passamwinde Faysal Sawadogo, Ali Yazbeck Coulibali and Aboubacar Drabo competed in Taekwondo.

Passamwinde Faysal Sawadogo won a bronze medal in the men's –80 kg event.

== Wrestling ==
Four athletes represented Burkina Faso in wrestling.

Key:

- VT – Victory by fall.
- PP – Decision by points – the loser with technical points.
- PO – Decision by points – the loser without technical points.
- ST – Great superiority – the loser without technical points and a margin of victory of at least 8 (Greco-Roman) or 10 (freestyle) points.
- SP – Technical superiority – the loser with technical points and a margin of victory of at least 8 (Greco-Roman) or 10 (freestyle) points.
- IN – Victory by injury – the loser is injured before or during a bout.

Men's freestyle

Athlete	Event	Qualification	Quarterfinal	Semifinal	Repechage 1	Final / BM	
Athlete	Event	Opposition Result	Opposition Result	Opposition Result	Opposition Result	Opposition Result	Rank
Drissa Zon	−74 kg	M Minsoumouna (CHA); W 8–1 ^{VT}	A Mambou (CGO); W 9–6 ^{PP}	O John (NGR); L 0–10 ^{VT}	Bye	J B Diatta (SEN); L 0–11 ^{ST}	5
Timothee Toe	−86 kg	Bye	C Abossolo (CMR); L 3–4 ^{PP}	did not advance			9
John Folane	−97 kg	Bye	F Naji (MAR); L 8–19 ^{SP}	did not advance			8

Women's freestyle

Athlete	Event	Qualification	Quarterfinal	Semifinal	Repechage 1	Final / BM	
Athlete	Event	Opposition Result	Opposition Result	Opposition Result	Opposition Result	Opposition Result	Rank
Yvette Zié	−68 kg	R Ayari (TUN); W 6–1 ^{PP}	A Hammiche (ALG); W 14–4 ^{SP}	B Oborududu (NGR); L 1–14 ^{VT}	Bye	S Amer (EGY); L 1–3 ^{PP}	5
