= 2019 African Games =

Multi-sport event in Rabat, Morocco

XII African Games
- Host city: Rabat, Morocco
- Nations: 53
- Athletes: 4386
- Events: 340 in 26 Sports
- Opening: 19 August 2019
- Closing: 31 August 2019
- Opened by: Prince Moulay Rachid
- Torch lighter: Assia Raziki
- Main venue: Prince Moulay Abdellah Stadium

The 12th African Games (Arabic: الألعاب الإفريقية الثانية عشرة), also known as Rabat 2019 (Arabic: الرباط 2019), were held from 19 to 31 August 2019 in Rabat, Morocco. This was the first time that the African Games were hosted by Morocco following the country's readmission to the African Union in January 2017.

Later five Egyptian athletes (Abderrahmane Al Sayed, Ibrahim Moustafa, Samar Hossein, Sara Ahmed Samir, Farag Salma) were disqualified due to anti-doping violations.

== Bidding process ==
The 12th African Games was scheduled in September 2019. Accra, Nairobi and Lusaka announced that they would bid for these Games, but none of them were selected.

Malabo, Equatorial Guinea was initially chosen to organise the 2019 African Games at the Second Ordinary Session of the Specialist Technical Committee on Youth, Culture and Sports, which was held at the headquarters of the African Union, in Addis Ababa, Ethiopia from 13 to 17 June 2016.

However, Equatorial Guinea was unable to host the Games due to economic problems. Lusaka, the capital of Zambia was later speculated to host the Games but refused, citing lack of facilities. In July 2018, Rabat, Morocco was selected to replace Malabo, Equatorial Guinea as host of the 2019 edition.

== Venues ==
=== Rabat-Salé-Kénitra ===
==== Rabat ====
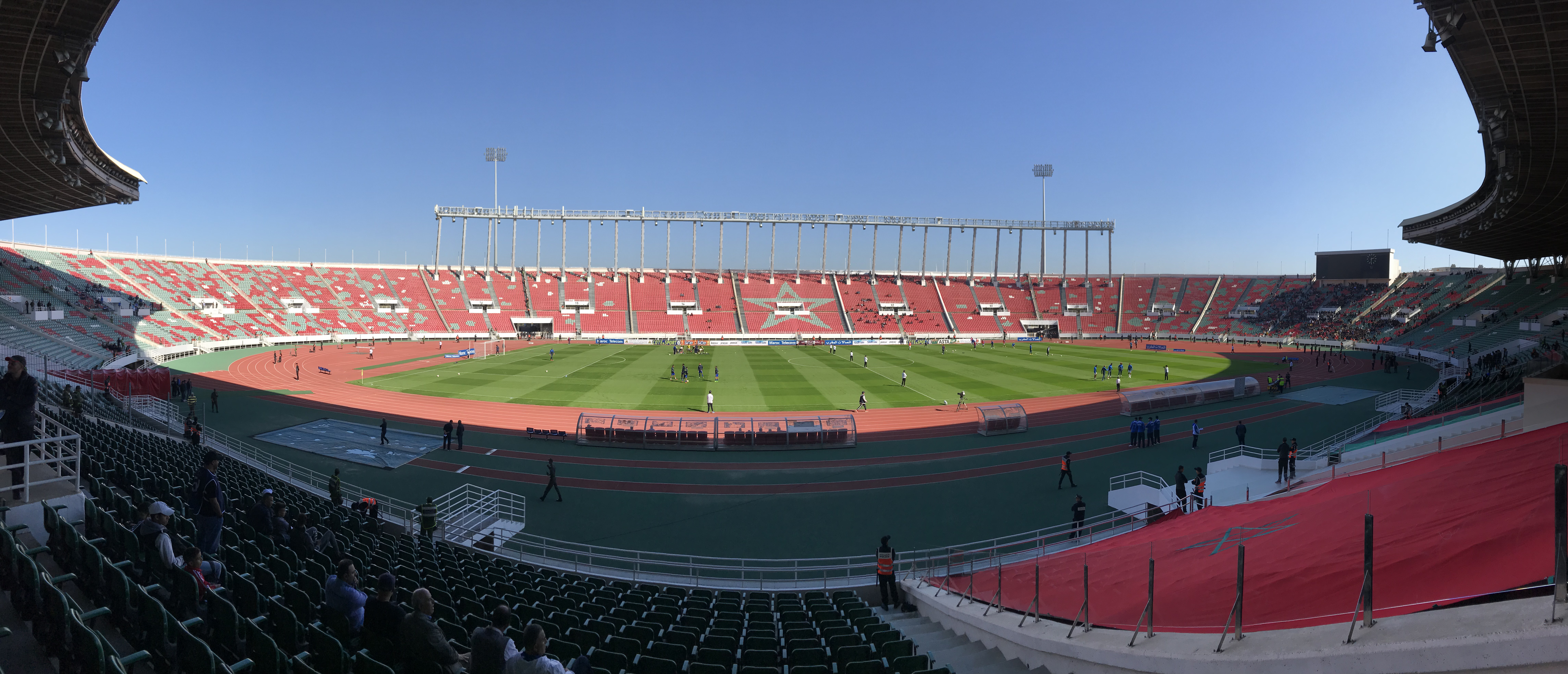
Prince Moulay Abdellah Stadium

- Prince Moulay Abdellah Sports Complex
- Prince Moulay Abdellah Stadium - athletics and ceremonies
- Main Arena-karate, judo and taekwondo
- Urban Forest - 3x3 Basketball
- Nahda Arena - weightlifting
- Al Amal Arena - boxing
- Ibn Rochd Center - gymnastics
- Bou Regreg Valley - triathlon
- Moulay Al Hassan Arena - table tennis
- Dar Essalam Royal Equestrian Complex - equestrian
- Cheminots Club - tennis

==== Salé ====
- Moulay Rachid National Sports Center - archery, fencing
- Salle El Bouâzzaoui - volleyball
- Al Arjat Shooting Center - shooting (skeet)
- Salé Beach - beach volleyball
- Mohamed Ben Abdellah Dam - rowing, canoe kayak (flatwater)
- Stade Boubker Ammar - football
- ASFAR Football Academy - football
- Stade des Chênes - football

=== Casablanca-Settat ===
==== Casablanca ====
- Stade Mohammed V Sports Complex - swimming, handball
- Ain Chok Arena - badminton
- Grand Mogador Hotel - chess
- Hotel Farah - snooker

==== Benslimane ====
- Road Cycling
- Stade Municipal El Mansouria - football

==== El Jadida ====
- El Jadida Sports Hall - wrestling

== Branding ==
The Games' logo was a door with Moroccan mosaic, while the mascot was an Atlas lion or a Barbary lion.

== Participating nations ==
Participating National Olympic Committees
- Algeria (268)
- Angola (90)
- Benin (24)
- Botswana (104)
- Burkina Faso (97)
- Burundi (54)
- Cameroon (126)
- Cape Verde (38)
- Central African Republic (17)
- Chad (59)
- Republic of the Congo (37)
- Comoros
- Ivory Coast (67)
- Djibouti (31)
- Democratic Republic of the Congo (263)
- Egypt (325)
- Equatorial Guinea (44)
- Eritrea (48)
- Eswatini (5)
- Ethiopia (176)
- Gabon (28)
- The Gambia (21)
- Ghana (96)
- Guinea (56)
- Guinea-Bissau (4)
- Kenya (250)
- Lesotho (27)
- Liberia (3)
- Libya (29)
- Madagascar (59)
- Malawi (22)
- Mali (98)
- Mauritania (10)
- Mauritius (91)
- Morocco (401) (Host)
- Mozambique (19)
- Namibia (68)
- Niger (42)
- Nigeria (311)
- Rwanda (11)
- São Tomé and Príncipe (21)
- Senegal (127)
- Seychelles (40)
- Sierra Leone (34)
- Somalia (11)
- South Africa (154)
- South Sudan (27)
- Sudan (28)
- Tanzania (10)
- Togo (29)
- Tunisia (177)
- Uganda (75)
- Zambia (68)
- Zimbabwe (66)

== Sports ==
The Rabat 2019 African Games featured 26 sports.

- 3x3 basketball (2)
- Archery (5)
- Athletics (46)
- Badminton (6)
- Boxing (13)
- Canoeing (18)
- Chess (5)
- Cycling (10)
- Equestrian (2)
- Fencing (12)
- Football (2)
- Gymnastics (14)
- Handball (2)
- Judo (14)
- Karate (16)
- Rowing (9)
- Shooting (5)
- Snooker (3)
- Swimming (42)
- Table tennis (7)
- Taekwondo (16)
- Tennis (6)
- Triathlon (3)
- Volleyball (4)
- Weightlifting (60)
- Wrestling (18)

== Calendar ==
The schedule of the games was as follows. The calendar was completed with event finals information.

OC	Opening ceremony	●	Event competitions	1	Gold medal events	CC	Closing ceremony

August		16th Fri	17th Sat	18th Sun	19th Mon	20th Tue	21st Wed	22nd Thu	23rd Fri	24th Sat	25th Sun	26th Mon	27th Tue	28th Wed	29th Thu	30th Fri	31st Sat	Events
Ceremonies					OC												CC	
3x3 basketball							●	●	●	●	2							2
Archery													●	●	●	5		5
Athletics												4	11	10	7	14		46
Badminton								●	●	●	1	●	●	●	5			6
Boxing						●	●	●	●	●	●	●		●	13			13
Canoeing														4	6	8		18
Chess										●	1	●	2	2				5
Cycling	Mountain biking						2		2									10
Cycling	Road cycling									2		2		1	1			10
Equestrian							●	1		1								2
Fencing												2	2	2	3	3		12
Football		●	●			●	●		●	●		●	●		1	1		2
Gymnastics												2	2	5	5			14
Handball						●	●	●		●	●	●		●	2			2
Judo			8	6														14
Karate										●	●	16						16
Rowing						●	4	4	1									9
Shooting											●	2	1		●	2		5
Snooker						1	1	●	●	1								3
Swimming							12	10	10	10								42
Table tennis						●	●	●	2		1	2	●	●	2			7
Taekwondo							6	6	4									16
Tennis									●	●	●	●	●	●	4	●	2	6
Triathlon										2	1							3
Volleyball	Beach volleyball	●	●	●		●	2											4
Volleyball	Indoor volleyball							●	●	●	●	●	●	●	●	1	1	4
Weightlifting											9	9	9	9	9	15		60
Wrestling														6	6	6		18
Daily medal events			8	6	0	1	27	21	19	16	15	39	27	39	64	55	3	340
Cumulative total			8	14	14	15	42	63	82	98	113	152	179	218	282	337	340	340
August		16th Fri	17th Sat	18th Sun	19th Mon	20th Tue	21st Wed	22nd Thu	23rd Fri	24th Sat	25th Sun	26th Mon	27th Tue	28th Wed	29th Thu	30th Fri	31st Sat	Events

Later five Egyptian athletes were disqualified due to anti-doping violations.

== Medal table ==
* Host nation (Morocco)

Rank	NOC	Gold	Silver	Bronze	Total
1	Egypt (EGY)	102	98	73	273
2	Nigeria (NGR)	46	33	48	127
3	South Africa (RSA)	36	26	25	87
4	Algeria (ALG)	33	32	60	125
5	Morocco (MAR)*	31	32	46	109
6	Tunisia (TUN)	26	36	35	97
7	Kenya (KEN)	11	10	10	31
8	Mauritius (MRI)	6	6	12	24
9	Ethiopia (ETH)	6	5	12	23
10	Madagascar (MAD)	6	4	2	12
11	Cameroon (CMR)	5	14	9	28
12	Ivory Coast (CIV)	5	5	8	18
13	Botswana (BOT)	5	3	6	14
14	Burkina Faso (BUR)	4	2	2	8
15	Ghana (GHA)	2	2	9	13
16	Angola (ANG)	2	2	4	8
16	Namibia (NAM)	2	2	4	8
18	Seychelles (SEY)	2	1	1	4
19	The Gambia (GAM)	2	1	0	3
20	Gabon (GAB)	2	0	4	6
21	Niger (NIG)	2	0	1	3
22	Senegal (SEN)	1	5	16	22
23	Mozambique (MOZ)	1	3	1	5
24	Zambia (ZAM)	1	1	3	5
25	São Tomé and Príncipe (STP)	1	1	1	3
26	Eritrea (ERI)	0	3	0	3
27	Democratic Republic of the Congo (COD)	0	2	9	11
28	Uganda (UGA)	0	2	8	10
29	Libya (LBA)	0	2	2	4
29	Mali (MLI)	0	2	2	4
31	Republic of the Congo (CGO)	0	1	3	4
31	Zimbabwe (ZIM)	0	1	3	4
33	Djibouti (DJI)	0	1	1	2
34	Guinea-Bissau (GBS)	0	1	0	1
34	Lesotho (LES)	0	1	0	1
36	Chad (CHA)	0	0	4	4
37	Rwanda (RWA)	0	0	3	3
38	Benin (BEN)	0	0	2	2
38	Guinea (GUI)	0	0	2	2
38	Togo (TOG)	0	0	2	2
41	Cape Verde (CPV)	0	0	1	1
41	Central African Republic (CAF)	0	0	1	1
Totals (42 entries)		340	340	435	1,115

Later five Egyptian athletes (Abderrahmane Al Sayed, Ibrahim Moustafa, Samar Hossein, Sara Ahmed Samir, Farag Salma) were disqualified due to anti-doping violations.
