= Athletics at the 2019 African Games – Men's half marathon =

The men's half marathon event at the 2019 African Games was held on 30 August in Rabat.

== Results ==
Rank	Name	Nationality	Time	Notes
1st place, gold medalist(s)	Titus Ekiru	Kenya	1:01:42	GR
2nd place, silver medalist(s)	Mohamed Reda El Aaraby	Morocco	1:02:44	
3rd place, bronze medalist(s)	Hamza Sahli	Morocco	1:02:45	
4	Morris Munene	Kenya	1:02:51	
5	Panuel Mkungo	Kenya	1:03:10	
6	Yasin Haji	Ethiopia	1:03:36	
7	Robert Chemonges	Uganda	1:03:57	
8	Guye Adola	Ethiopia	1:04:12	
9	Belay Tilahun	Ethiopia	1:05:16	
10	Ghirmay Ghebreslassie	Eritrea	1:05:27	
11	Yonas Tsighe	Eritrea	1:05:34	
12	Ahmed Bakry	Egypt	1:06:13	
13	Moses Tarakinyu	Zimbabwe	1:08:09	
14	Jeremia Shaliaxwe	Namibia	1:08:36	
15	Ngor Ngor	South Sudan	1:10:19	
16	Ruben Sança	Cape Verde	1:10:37	
17	Valentin Betoudji	Chad	1:10:44	
18	Jonathan Atse Herrera	Ivory Coast	1:11:31	
19	Venâncio Tchingombe	Angola	1:11:38	
20	Vincent Kyondwa Kapatala	Democratic Republic of the Congo	1:13:54	
	Mumin Booqora Gala	Djibouti	DNF	
	Belal Ahmed	Egypt	DNF	
	Jobo Khatoane	Lesotho	DNS	
	Felix Chemonges	Uganda	DNS	
