= Moshood Abiola National Stadium =

Stadium in Abuja, Nigeria

Coordinates: 9°2′16.5″N 7°27′12.2″E

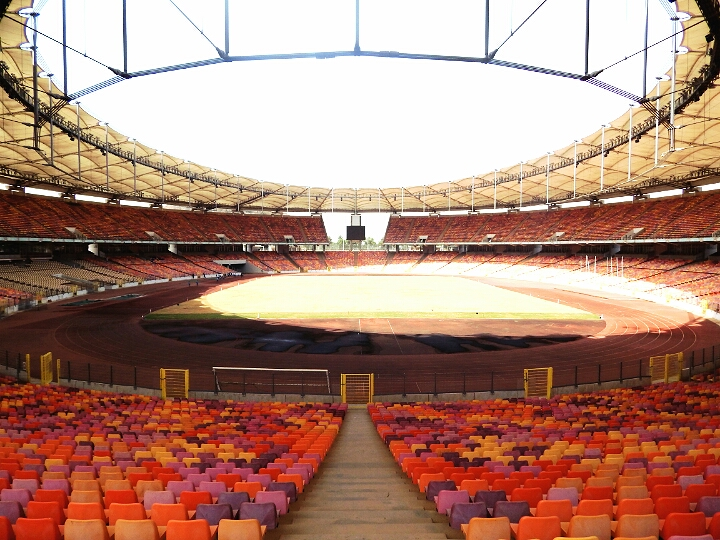
- View of the stadium
- Interactive map of Moshood Abiola National Stadium
- Full name: Moshood Abiola National Stadium
- Former names: National Stadium, Abuja (2003–2019)
- Location: Abuja, FCT, Nigeria
- Capacity: 60,491 (football)
- Executive suites: 56
- Surface: Grass
- Record attendance: 60,000 (Nigeria vs South Africa, 1 June 2008)

Construction
- Groundbreaking: 2000
- Opened: 8 April 2003; 23 years ago
- Cost: $360 million
- Architect: Schlaich Bergermann Partner

Tenant
- Nigeria national football team (2003–present)

Moshood Abiola National Stadium (formerly known as National Stadium, Abuja) is a multipurpose national sports stadium located in Abuja, in the Federal Capital Territory of Nigeria. The stadium serves as a home to the Nigerian national football team, as well as a center for various social, cultural, and religious events. The Federal Government of Nigeria approved the contract for the construction of the National Stadium complex and Games Village on 18 July 2000. The stadium was constructed to host the 8th All Africa Games which took place in October 2003. On 12 June 2019, President Muhammadu Buhari announced the change of the name of the National Stadium, Abuja to Moshood Abiola National Stadium after former Nigerian politician chief M.K.O. Abiola. President Buhari made this pronouncement during his speech at the Democracy Day celebration at the Eagle Square, Abuja.

== Construction and Architecture ==
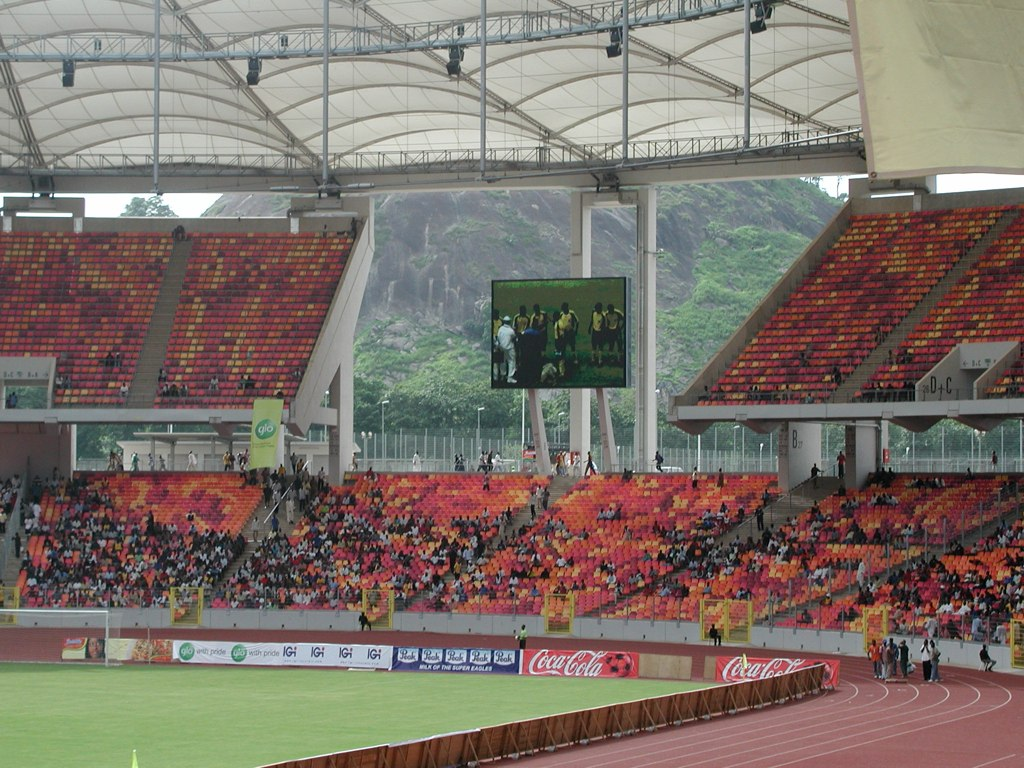
Seats view of the stadium

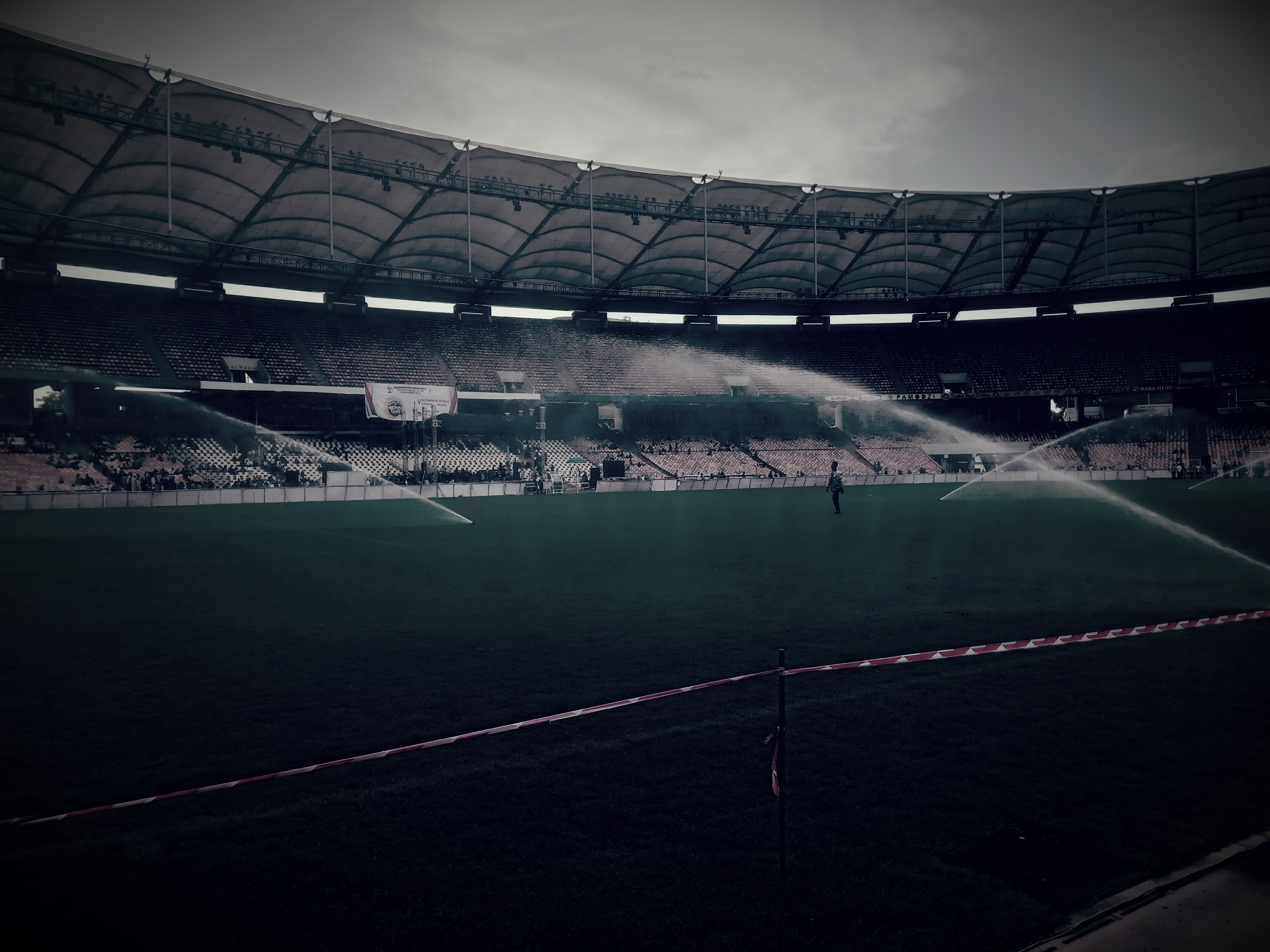

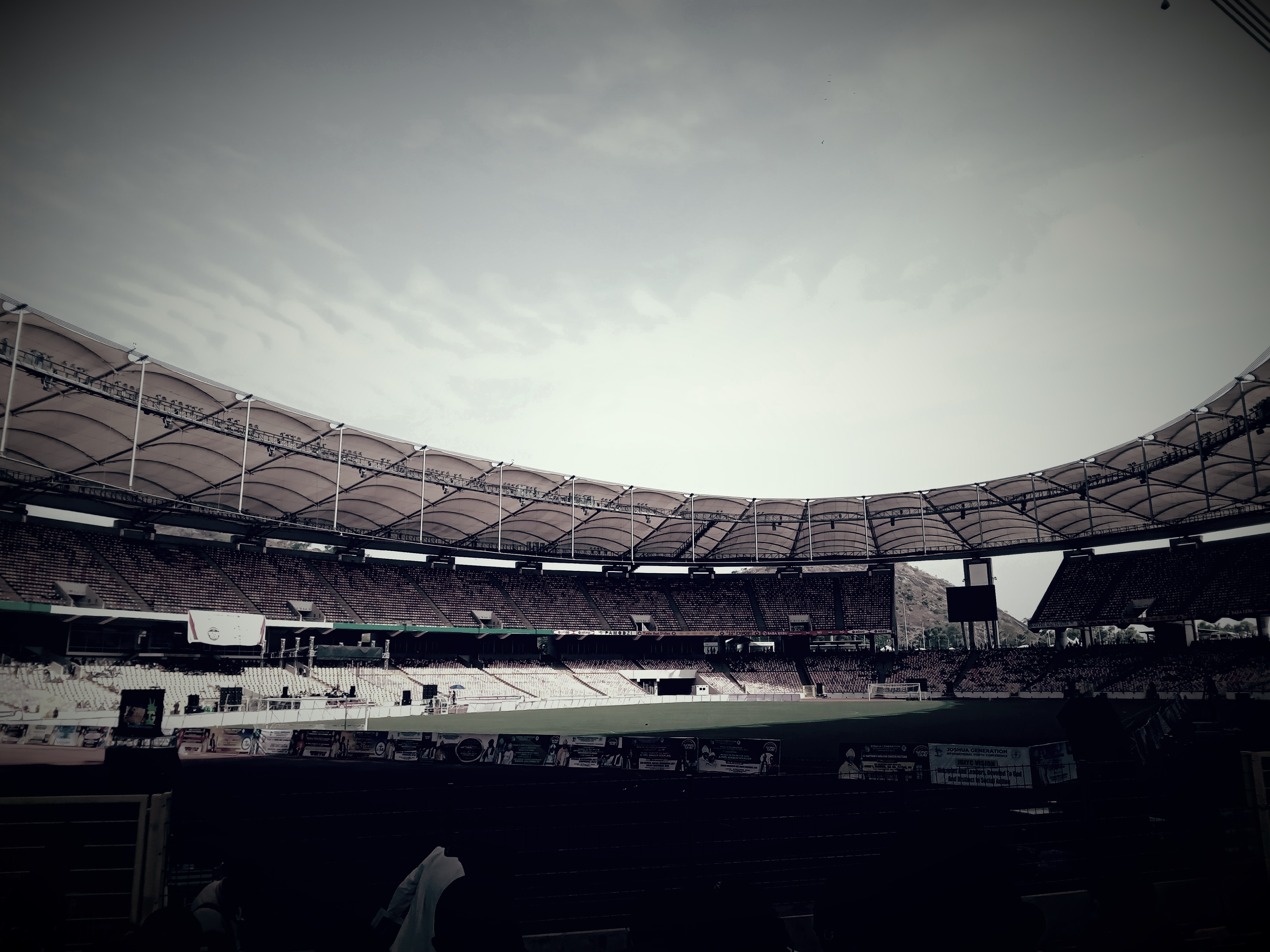

In 2014, Moshood Abiola National Stadium was one of the 50 most expensive stadiums ever built in the world.

== Structure ==
The stadium is designed to accommodate 60,491 spectators covered by a lightweight roof construction. The main characteristics are the two overlapping spectator tiers; the lower tier accommodating 32,000 seats and the upper tier 28,000 seats. The lower tier also incorporates 56 corporate suites with viewing terraces and one presidential lounge for 50 guests. All functional and secondary areas are accommodated in the entrance building which provides a gross floor area of approximately 25,000 m^{2}. This building is arranged below the concourse level which serves as the spectators' distribution level and provides several kiosks, banks, first aid stations and toilets. The structure of the stadium is a combination of in situ and precast concrete elements. There are 36 towers supporting the upper tier and the roof structure. These towers are founded on 140 bored piles with diameters of 1.30 m and 1.50 m in a depth of 8.00 m to 30.00 m. Precast concrete elements varying between 13 and 15 meters in length are placed between the towers, forming the spectator stands. A total of 6,300 precast elements were produced in the company's production yard 15 kilometers away. The towers are connected on the top by a 2.50 m high and 2.00 m wide hollow concrete ring beam with a wall thickness of 0.35 m. The roof structure is fixed on 36 massive concrete points to the ring-beam. For the first time in the world, the ringbeam for this kind of roof structure was made of concrete. The roof structure itself is a cable construction with a weight of 800 tons carrying a 28.000 m^{2} membrane.

== Facilities ==
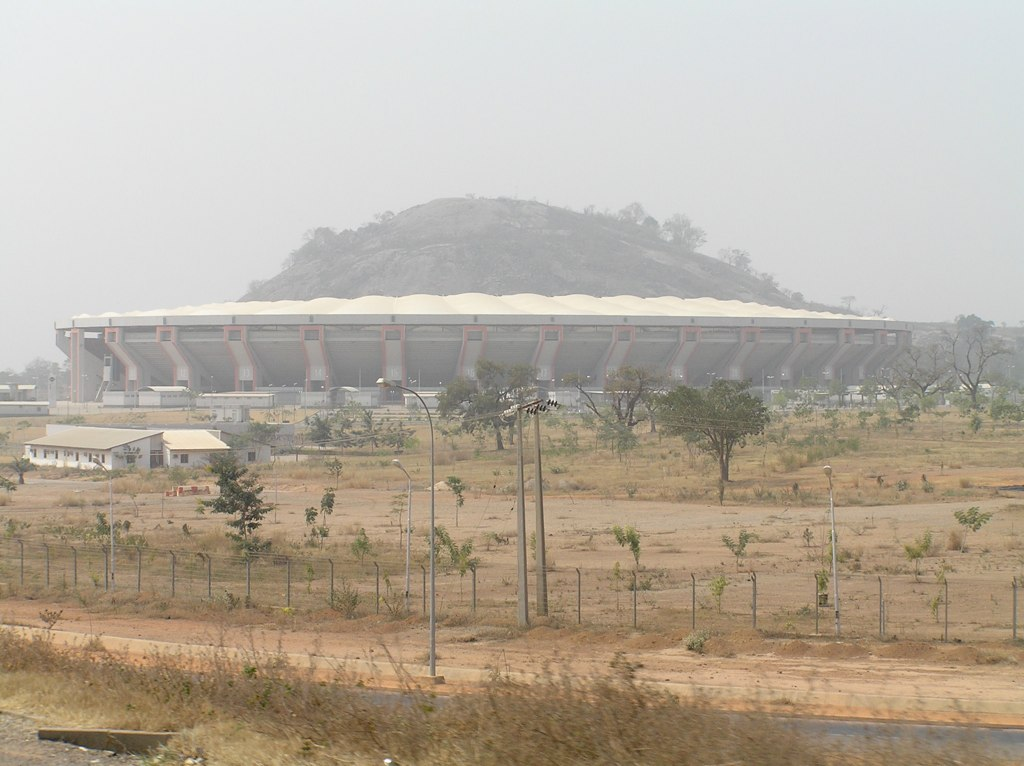
External view

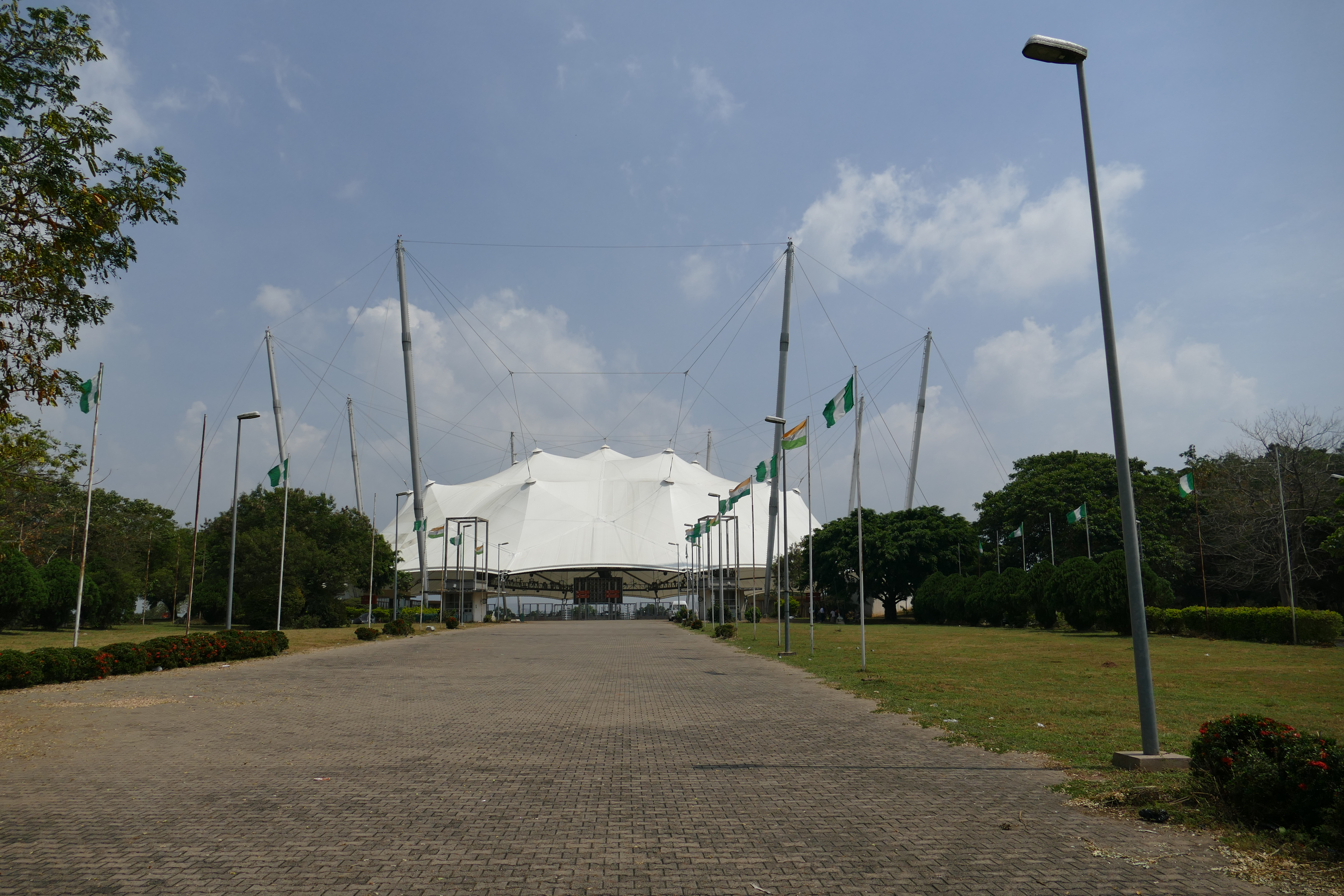
The Abuja Velodrome

All facilities within the stadium are designed and engineered in compliance with the requirements of international sport associations, particularly the Fédération Internationale de Football Association (FIFA) and the International Association of Athletics Federations (IAAF).

The complex includes:

- 60,491 capacity covered main bowl
- A Velodrome
- Presidential suite and viewing area
- 56 corporate suites
- Post offices
- Banks
- Media facilities
- Two scoreboards and floodlights
- Shops and kiosks for snacks
- Helipad
- 3000 capacity indoor sports hall
- 2000 capacity gymnasium
- 2000 capacity swimming pool
- Tennis Courts
- 3000 capacity hockey stadium
- Baseball and softball complex

Moshood Abiola National Stadium meets the requirements of the International safety standards; it is equipped with emergency service units, closed circuit security cameras as well as crowd control steel fencing. There are also stand-by fire fighting equipment and metal detectors which have been put in place to avoid any misfortunes.

== History of the Stadium ==
Although Nigeria had several stadiums scattered throughout the country, there was a lack of stadiums that met international standards. The capital city of Nigeria, Abuja, was selected to host the 8th All Africa Games in 2000 (a regional multi-sport event held every four years, organized by the Association of National Olympic Committees of Africa) despite having no facilities for such a major sporting event. The Federal Government of Nigeria embarked on a multimillion-dollar project for the construction of a state-of-the-art stadium and games village to be completed in time to host the All Africa Games. The contract was awarded on 18 July 2000 from a choice list of about 80 different bidders. Construction of the complex was initiated.

Citizens and athletes had doubts as to whether the completion of the stadium was feasible before the games. However, construction went very smoothly and ended up being ahead of schedule. As a matter of fact, the stadium was scheduled to be the host center for the Miss World Beauty Pageant that took place later in 2002. Unfortunately, the stadium not being fully completed by then as well as an uprising amongst citizens especially in the northern city of Kaduna which resulted in loss of lives forced the pageant to relocate to London, England. The construction of the main bowl went on from its inception in September 2000 to its completion in April 2003, well in time for the games. The Games Village construction went on from September 2000 to August 2003.

The official commissioning of the complex was on 8 April 2003. Following its commissioning was the final leg of preparations for the games. The games that year were the largest in All Africa Games history; 6,000 athletes from 53 countries competed in 22 sports, watched over by 1,200 officials. Over 1,500 journalists reported for the world's media. The games took place from the 4th to 18 October 2003 and was deemed successful by many. The host country, Nigeria, accumulated a total of 226 medals, emerging as leader of the games that year.

Apart from the All African Games, the stadium has hosted important football matches, such as World Cup qualifiers between Nigeria and other countries. The first game played at the stadium was a football (soccer) match between two local rival teams; the Shooting Stars of Ibadan and Sunshine Stars of Akure on 8 April 2003. The first goal scored in the complex was from Shooting Stars' striker Shakiru Lawal who scored the only goal of the game after just five minutes.

The complex has given the country confidence to bid for various up-coming international events. The Federation of International Volleyball (FIVB) has given the Nigeria Volleyball Federation (NVBF) the provisional hosting rights of the 2007 World Youth Championship because of the facilities the stadium has.

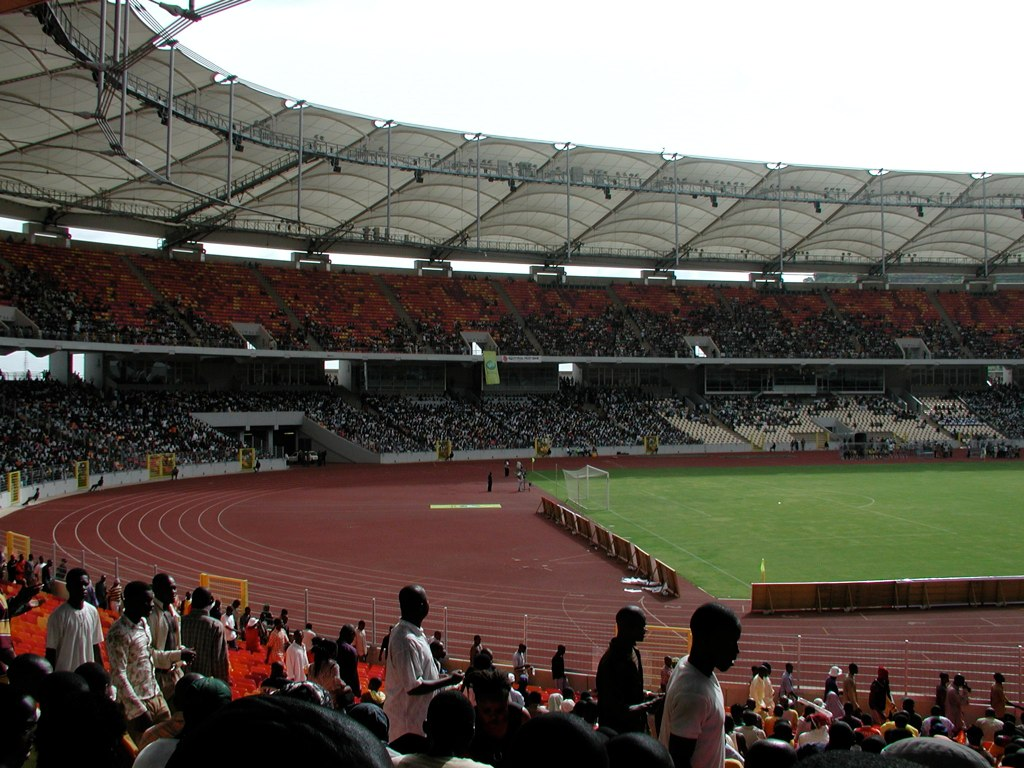
The stadium during a match

== Other uses ==
Apart from its function as a sports center, Moshood Abiola National Stadium serves as a home to cultural and religious events. Its capacity attracts various events such as concerts, and religious conferences, events which sometimes have preference over sports. Nigeria is a highly religious country with a population split almost equally between Christianity and Islam. Due to this fact, several religious events occur each year that attract a lot of citizens and require a large capacity arena. For example, in September 2006, the Nigeria Football Association was rendered helpless over the Presidency's preference of a religious event in the main bowl of the Moshood Abiola National Stadium to an international football match against Rwanda.

Some citizens are however concerned about the use of the stadium for such large events. Similar events held at the Stadium in Lagos resulted in its demise. The management of the stadium, however, intends to keep these events coming. Cost of maintenance is an issue and renting out the facility for various events is a strategy that has been employed to cover these costs. There were no plans whatsoever by the former military ruler late general Sani Abacha to build a national stadium in Abuja as some people might think.

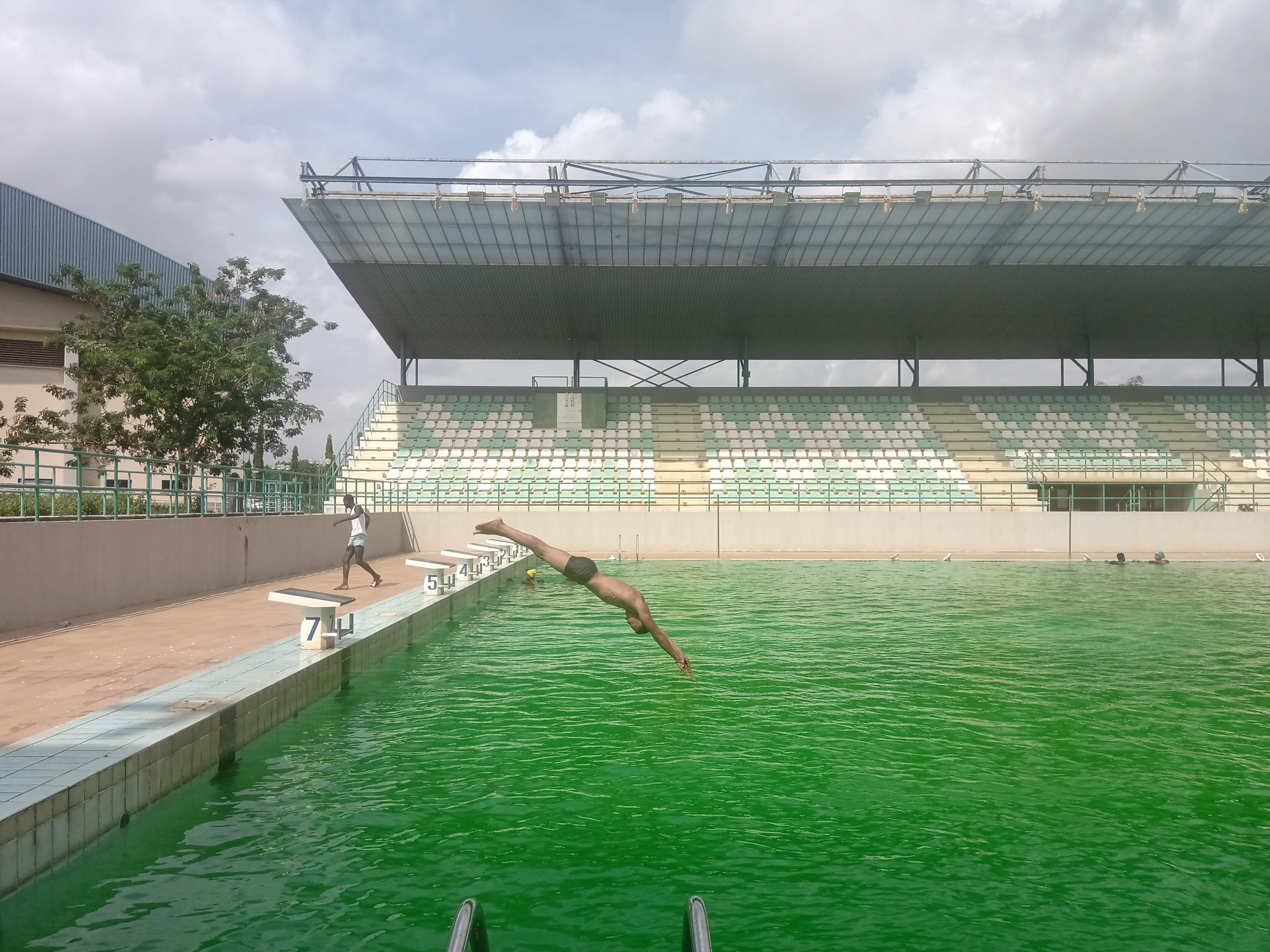
The pool at the Stadium's sport complex

== Maintenance ==
Several issues have risen concerning the maintenance of the sports complex. The National Stadium in Lagos, the most populous and industrialized city in the country, was built for the 1973 All-Africa Games. Though it initially was considered state-of-the-art, it today is considered below any standard facility-wise and environmental-wise. The Nigerian sports boss Amos Adamu advised the government to privatize the Abuja stadium immediately after the 2003 All-Africa Games in order to forestall the vandalisation typical of publicly owned buildings.

The federal government of Nigeria, who owns 100% equity on the property at the moment, has faced a lot of antagonism both locally and internationally. The average estimate for annual maintenance since its inauguration has been about $7 million, a number considered high by many standards. Due to the high cost of maintenance, the federal government has been seeking options for privatization of the facility. Through the Bureau of Public Enterprises (BPE), the Federal Government of Nigeria intends to grant a concession to a sole Concessionaire who will enter into an investment commitment, and essentially operate the stadium with a primary goal of generating revenue from the proceeds of sporting events, concerts, religious activities, corporate sponsorship, corporate advertising and other promotional activities.

The Concessionaire has the choice of assuming the role of Facility Manager for the property encompassed in the National Stadium and the Indoor Sports Complex, or employ a firm to perform the task. The BPE will act as the monitor in the arrangement, and the Concessionaire will report to the federal government through the BPE. A minimum tenure of 20 years was recommended, subject to review every five years. Maintenance of the Stadium and its external areas will be the responsibility of the Concessionaire.

== Change of Name ==
On 12 June 2019, President Muhammadu Buhari renamed the national stadium in Abuja after the winner of the 1993 presidential election, Moshood Abiola. It is widely believed that Mr Abiola won the June 1993 presidential election based on available results, but the election was cancelled by the military government of Ibrahim Babangida. President Buhari in 2018 recognised Mr Abiola's mandate by conferring on him the country's highest national honour of the Grand Commander of the Federal Republic, reserved only for presidents. While President Muhammadu Buhari was delivering his speech at the change of name event, which also marked Nigeria's 20th year of uninterrupted democracy, President Buhari said “Henceforth it will be called the Moshood Abiola National Stadium". The event at the Eagles Square was attended by other foreign leaders, including the president of Rwanda, Paul Kagame.

== Transport connections ==
The stadium is served by the 'Stadium' station on the Yellow line of the Abuja Rail Mass Transit network.

== Notable football matches ==
=== 2009 FIFA U-17 World Cup ===
Date	Team 1	Result	Team 2	Attendance	Round
24 October 2009	Honduras	0–1	Argentina	19,560	Group A
24 October 2009	Nigeria	3–3	Germany	21,300	Group A
27 October 2009	Argentina	2–1	Germany	14,400	Group A
27 October 2009	Nigeria	1–0	Honduras	42,900	Group A
30 October 2009	Germany	3–1	Honduras	3,090	Group A
30 October 2009	Switzerland	1–0	Brazil	4,250	Group B
5 November 2009	Nigeria	5–0	New Zealand	35,200	Round of 16
15 November 2009	Colombia	0–1	Spain	40,000	Third place match
15 November 2009	Switzerland	1–0	Nigeria	60,000	Final

=== FIFA investigation into Football 4 U International ===
On 1 June 2011, Nigeria hosted a friendly match against Argentina in the Abuja stadium. The game had been organised by Football 4 U International, a Singapore-based private company led by Dan Tan and Wilson Raj Perumal. The company had offered FIFA the financing of international exhibition matches if it allowed the organisation choose the referees. In the friendly against Argentina, the main official was Ibrahim Chaibou of Niger, who had been involved in highly controversial decisions in previous matches involving South Africa and Guatemala, as well as others in South America and small leagues in Egypt.

After Chaibou sanctioned a penalty kick against Nigeria in the 98th minute, which was scored by Argentine player Mauro Boselli. FIFA concluded its investigation into Chaibou in January 2019, banning him for life from any football-linked activity.

== See also ==
- List of football stadiums in Nigeria
- Lists of stadiums
- BPE Nigeria Bureau of Public Enterprises, Nigeria
- 2014 Bid Website, Commonwealth Games 2014
- Julius Berger Official Website for Julius Berger Nigeria PLC
- Vanguard Newspaper Local Newspaper (Nigeria)
- The Daily Champion Local Newspaper (Nigeria)
- CNN Report on Miss World 2002
- 2K+ International Sports Media

Preceded by Seoul World Cup Stadium; Seoul	FIFA U-17 World Cup; Final venue 2009	Succeeded by Estadio Azteca; Mexico City
