= Ethiopia at the 2019 African Games =

- Flag of Ethiopia
- IOC code: ETH
- NOC: Ethiopian Olympic Committee

in Rabat, Morocco 19 August 2019 – 31 August 2019
- Competitors: 177 (96 men and 81 women) in 13 sports
- Medals Ranked 9th: Gold 6 Silver 5 Bronze 12 Total 23

African Games appearances
- 1965; 1973; 1978; 1987; 1991; 1995; 1999; 2003; 2007; 2011; 2015; 2019; 2023

Ethiopia competed at the 2019 African Games held from 19 to 31 August 2019 in Rabat, Morocco. In total, athletes representing Ethiopia won six gold medals, five silver medals and 12 bronze medals and the country finished 9th in the medal table.

== Medal summary ==
=== Medal table ===
| Medal | Name | Sport | Event | Date |
|---|---|---|---|---|
| Gold | Tariku Girma Demisu | Taekwondo | Men's -63 kg | 22 August |
| Gold | Berehanu Tsegu | Athletics | Men's 10,000 metres | 27 August |
| Gold | Hirut Meshesha | Athletics | Women's 800 metres | 27 August |
| Gold | Mekides Abebe | Athletics | Women's 3000 metres steeplechase | 28 August |
| Gold | Tsehay Gemechu | Athletics | Women's 10,000 metres | 29 August |
| Gold | Yalemzerf Yehualaw | Athletics | Women's half marathon | 30 August |
| Silver | Getnet Wale | Athletics | Men's 3000 metres steeplechase | 26 August |
| Silver | Hawi Feysa | Athletics | Women's 5000 metres | 26 August |
| Silver | Yohanis Algaw | Athletics | Men's 20 kilometres walk | 28 August |
| Silver | Zeineba Yimer | Athletics | Women's 10,000 metres | 29 August |
| Silver | Degitu Azimeraw | Athletics | Women's half marathon | 30 August |
| Bronze | Solomon Tufa Demse | Taekwondo | Men's -54 kg | 22 August |
| Bronze | Tsebaot Gosaye Fikadu | Taekwondo | Women's -53 kg | 21 August |
| Bronze | Women's Ethiopia team | Cycling | Women's Team Time Trial | 24 August |
| Bronze | Alemitu Tariku | Athletics | Women's 5000 metres | 26 August |
| Bronze | Jemal Yimer | Athletics | Men's 10,000 metres | 27 August |
| Bronze | Ariyat Dibow | Athletics | Women's high jump | 27 August |
| Bronze | Dawit Wibshet | Boxing | Men's flyweight (52kg) | 28 August |
| Bronze | Weynshet Ansa | Athletics | Women's 3000 metres steeplechase | 28 August |
| Bronze | Yehualeye Beletew | Athletics | Women's 20 kilometres walk | 28 August |
| Bronze | Dera Dida | Athletics | Women's 10,000 metres | 29 August |
| Bronze | Lemlem Hailu | Athletics | Women's 1500 metres | 30 August |
| Bronze | Meseret Belete | Athletics | Women's half marathon | 30 August |

Medals by sport
| Sport | 1st place, gold medalist(s) | 2nd place, silver medalist(s) | 3rd place, bronze medalist(s) | Total |
| Athletics | 5 | 5 | 8 | 18 |
| Boxing | 0 | 0 | 1 | 1 |
| Cycling | 0 | 0 | 1 | 1 |
| Taekwondo | 1 | 0 | 2 | 3 |
| Total | 6 | 5 | 12 | 23 |

== Athletics ==
Ethiopia competed in athletics: the country won five gold medals, five silver medals and eight bronze medals and the country finished 3rd in the athletics medal table.

=== Men ===
In the men's 10,000 metres event Berehanu Tsegu won the gold medal and Jemal Yimer won the bronze medal.

In the men's 3000 metres steeplechase the silver medal was won by Getnet Wale.

In the men's 20 kilometres walk the silver medal was won by Yohanis Algaw.

=== Women ===
In the women's 800 metres event Hirut Meshesha won the gold medal.

In the women's 1500 metres event Lemlem Hailu won the bronze medal.

In the women's 5000 metres both the silver and bronze medals were won by athletes representing Ethiopia: Hawi Feysa won the silver medal and Alemitu Tariku won the bronze medal. Ejgayehu Taye also competed in this event and finished in 5th place.

In the women's 10,000 metres all medals were won by athletes representing Ethiopia: Tsehay Gemechu, Zeineba Yimer and Dera Dida won the gold, silver and bronze medals respectively.

In the women's 3000 metres steeplechase the gold medal was won by Mekides Abebe and the bronze medal was won by Weynshet Ansa. Birtukan Admu also competed in this event and finished in 4th place.

In the women's 20 kilometres walk the bronze medal was won by Yehualeye Beletew.

In the women's half marathon the medals were all won by athletes representing Ethiopia: Yalemzerf Yehualaw, Degitu Azimeraw and Meseret Belete won the gold, silver and bronze medals respectively. Yalemzerf Yehualaw also set a new African Games record in this event of 1:10:26.

In the women's high jump event the bronze medal was won by Ariyat Dibow.

== Badminton ==
Ethiopia competed in badminton with six players.

== Boxing ==
Ethiopia competed in boxing.

Dawit Wibshet won the bronze medal in the men's flyweight (52kg) event.

== Chess ==
Habtamu Ashenafi Gole, Leykun Mesfin Sisay, Ruth Leykun Eshete and Lidet Abate Haile are scheduled to compete in chess.

== Cycling ==
Ethiopia competed in cycling.

Tsega Gebre Beyene, Mhiret Gebreyewhans, Selam Amha and Eyerusalem Reda won the bronze medal in the women's road team time trial.

== Gymnastics ==
Ethiopia competed in gymnastics.

== Karate ==
Ethiopia competed in karate.

== Swimming ==
No medals were won by swimmers representing Ethiopia at the 2019 African Games.

== Table tennis ==
No medals were won by table tennis players representing Ethiopia at the 2019 African Games.

== Taekwondo ==
Ethiopia competed in Taekwondo. Tariku Girma Demisu won the gold medal in the men's -63 kg event.

Solomon Tufa Demse won the bronze medal in the men's -54 kg event and Tsebaot Gosaye Fikadu won the bronze medal in the Women's -53 kg event.

Nardos Chifra competed in the women's -49 kg event without winning a medal.

== Tennis ==
Ethiopia competed in several events in tennis.
