= Kenya at the 2019 African Games =

- Flag of Kenya
- IOC code: KEN
- NOC: National Olympic Committee of Kenya

in Rabat, Morocco 19 August 2019 – 31 August 2019
- Competitors: 259 (128 men and 131 women) in 21 sports
- Medals Ranked 7th: Gold 11 Silver 10 Bronze 10 Total 31

African Games appearances (overview)
- 1965; 1973; 1978; 1987; 1991; 1995; 1999; 2003; 2007; 2011; 2015; 2019; 2023

Kenya competed at the 2019 African Games held from 19 to 31 August 2019 in Rabat, Morocco. In total, 290 athletes were scheduled to represent Kenya at 12th edition of the African Games. This later dropped to 259 athletes. Athletes representing Kenya won 11 gold medals, 10 silver medals and 10 bronze medals and the country finished 7th in the medal table.

== Medal summary ==
Medals by sport
Sport	1st place, gold medalist(s)	2nd place, silver medalist(s)	3rd place, bronze medalist(s)	Total
Athletics	10	7	3	20
Boxing	0	1	4	5
Cycling	0	0	1	1
Swimming	0	0	1	1
Taekwondo	0	1	1	2
Volleyball	1	1	0	2
Total	11	10	10	31

=== Medal table ===
Medal	Name	Sport	Event	Date
Gold	Benjamin Kigen	Athletics	Men's 3000 metres steeplechase	26 August
Gold	Lilian Kasait Rengeruk	Athletics	Women's 5000 metres	26 August
Gold	Samuel Gathimba	Athletics	Men's 20 kilometres walk	28 August
Gold	Emily Ngii	Athletics	Women's 20 kilometres walk	28 August
Gold	Women's team	Volleyball	Women's tournament	30 August
Gold	George Manangoi	Athletics	Men's 1500 metres	30 August
Gold	Titus Ekiru	Athletics	Men's half marathon	30 August
Gold	Robert Kiprop	Athletics	Men's 5000 metres	30 August
Gold	Julius Yego	Athletics	Men's javelin throw	30 August
Gold	Quailyne Jebiwott Kiprop	Athletics	Women's 1500 metres	30 August
Gold	Vanice Nyagisera	Athletics	Women's 400 metres hurdles	30 August
Silver	Gaudencia Nakhumicha Makokha; Naomie Too	Beach volleyball	Women's tournament	20 August
Silver	Faith Ogallo	Taekwondo	Women's +73 kg	22 August
Silver	Cornelius Tuwei	Athletics	Men's 800 metres	28 August
Silver	Grace Wanjiru	Athletics	Women's 20 kilometres walk	28 August
Silver	Mercy Gitahi	Athletics	Women's 3000 metres steeplechase	28 August
Silver	Hassan Shaffi Bakari	Boxing	Men's flyweight (52 kg)	29 August
Silver	Alexander Kiprotich	Athletics	Men's javelin throw	30 August
Silver	Mathew Sawe	Athletics	Men's high jump	30 August
Silver	Mary Kuria	Athletics	Women's 1500 metres	30 August
Silver	Edward Zakayo	Athletics	Men's 5000 metres	30 August
Bronze	Everlyne Aluocheolod	Taekwondo	Women's –73 kg	22 August
Bronze	Nancy Akinyi Debe	Cycling	Women's cross-country marathon	23 August
Bronze	Sylvia Brunlehner; Rebecca Kamau; Emily Muteti; Maria Brunlehner	Swimming	Women's 4 × 100 metre medley relay	24 August
Bronze	Boniface Maina	Boxing	Men's welterweight (69 kg)	28 August
Bronze	Elly Ochola	Boxing	Men's heavyweight (91 kg)	28 August
Bronze	George Ouma	Boxing	Men's middleweight (75 kg)	28 August
Bronze	Fredrick Ramogi	Boxing	Men's super heavyweight (+91 kg)	28 August
Bronze	Maximila Imali; Milcent Ndoro; Maureen Nyatichi Thomas; Joan Cherono	Athletics	Women's 4 × 100 metres relay	28 August
Bronze	Richard Yator	Athletics	Men's 5000 metres	30 August
Bronze	Charles Simotwo	Athletics	Men's 1500 metres	30 August

== 3x3 basketball ==
Kenya competed in both the men's and women's tournaments.

The men's team lost all their matches in the group phase and did not advance to the semi-finals.

The women's team finished in 4th place.

== Archery ==
Kenya competed in archery. Sayed Mohamed Akeel, Shehzana Anwar and Diramu Golicha Elema competed in several archery events.

== Athletics ==
In total 61 athletes competed in athletics. Beatrice Chepkoech, Paul Tanui and Julius Yego are among the athletes to represent Kenya in athletics at the 2019 African Games. Hyvin Kiyeng, Conseslus Kipruto, Benjamin Kigen and Joash Kiplimo were scheduled to compete.

Titus Ekiru won the men's half marathon with a time of 1:01:42. He became the first Kenyan to win this event at the African Games. This was also a new African Games record.

== Badminton ==
Kenya competed in badminton with 8 players.

== Boxing ==
Ethan Maina, Boniface Mugunde, Nick Okoth, Boniface Mugunde, George Kosby, Veronica Mbithe and Elizabeth Akinyi were among the boxers to represent Kenya at the 2019 African Games. Lorna Kusa also represented Kenya in boxing.

== Chess ==
Kenya competed in chess. Mehul Manilal Gohil, Mongeli Maingi, Joyce Nyaruai Ndirangu and Ricky Kipng'etich Sang were scheduled to compete in chess.

== Cycling ==
Kenya competed in both mountain bike cycling and road cycling.

Nancy Akinyi Debe won one of the two bronze medals in the women's cross-country marathon event. Fatima Zahraa El Hayani representing Morocco also won a bronze medal in this event as both cyclists finished with a time of 2:29:58.520.

== Handball ==
Kenya competed in the women's handball tournament. The women's team lost all their matches and did not advance to the quarter-finals.

== Judo ==
18 athletes represented Kenya in judo. Among these are: Esther Ikiugu, Carlos Ochieng, Evans Omondi, Kimberly Okwisa, Peterson Gathiru, Lydia Wangui, Mathew Mutinda, Alice Lokale, Isaac Muyale, and Diana Kana.

== Karate ==
Kenya competed in karate.

== Rowing ==
Five rowers represented Kenya in rowing.

Paluwas Ramadhani competed in the men's single sculls 500 metres event.

Diana Natecho competed in the women's single sculls 500 metres event.

Alex Osiako competed in the men's lightweight single sculls 500 metres event.

Josephine Wangithi competed in the women's lightweight single sculls 500 metres event.

Diana Natecho and Suleiman Ramdhani competed in the mixed 2 × 500 metres single sculls event.

== Shooting ==
Two athletes represented Kenya in shooting (in the men's trap and men's skeet events).

Matharu Jaspal Singh competed in the men's trap and the men's skeet event.

Dhruv Rajesh Shah competed in the men's skeet event.

== Swimming ==
Kenya competed in swimming. Eight swimmers were scheduled to compete: Maria Chantal Brunlehner, Rebecca Wacui Kamau, Maahir Abdulkadir Mohamed Marunani, Issa Abdulla Mohamed, Ridhwan Abubakar Bwana Mohamed, Emily Siobhan Muteti, Samuel Kariuki Ndonga and Swaleh Abubakar Talib.

Kenyan swimmers won the bronze medal in the women's 4 × 100 metre medley relay event.

== Table tennis ==
Kenya competed in table tennis.

== Taekwondo ==
Faith Wanjiku Ogallo won the silver medal in the women's +73 kg event.

Everlyne Aluocheolod won a bronze medal in the women's –73 kg event.

== Tennis ==
Kenya competed in tennis.

== Triathlon ==
Kenyan athletes competed in the men's, the women's event and the mixed relay event.

== Volleyball ==
Both Kenya's men's team and women's team competed at the 2019 African Games. The women's team won the gold medal in the women's tournament.

Kenya also won the silver medal in the women's beach volleyball tournament.

== Weightlifting ==
Kenya competed in weightlifting.

== Wrestling ==
Kenya competed in wrestling. No medals were won.
