= Athletics at the 2019 African Games =

Athletics at the XII African Games
- Dates: 26–30 August
- Host city: Rabat, Morocco
- Venue: Prince Moulay Abdellah Stadium
- Events: 42
- Participation: 677 athletes from 52 nations

Athletics at the 2019 African Games was held from 26 to 30 August 2019 in Rabat, Morocco.

== Medal summary ==
=== Men ===
Event	Gold		Silver		Bronze	
100 metres	Raymond Ekevwo; Nigeria	9.96	Arthur Cissé; Ivory Coast	9.97	Usheoritse Itsekiri; Nigeria	10.02
200 metres	Sydney Siame; Zambia	20.35	Divine Oduduru; Nigeria	20.54	Anaso Jobodwana; South Africa	20.56
400 metres	Leungo Scotch; Botswana	45.27	Thapelo Phora; South Africa	45.59	Chidi Okezie; Nigeria	45.61
800 metres	Abdessalem Ayouni; Tunisia	1:45.17; NR	Cornelius Tuwei; Kenya	1:45.41	Oussama Nabil; Morocco	1:45.42
1500 metres	George Manangoi; Kenya	3:38.27	Ayanleh Souleiman; Djibouti	3:38.44	Charles Simotwo; Kenya	3:38.51
5000 metres	Robert Kiprop; Kenya	13:30.96	Edward Zakayo; Kenya	13:31.40	Richard Yator; Kenya	13:31.41
10,000 metres	Berehanu Tsegu; Ethiopia	27:56.81	Aron Kifle; Eritrea	27:57.79	Jemal Yimer; Ethiopia	27:59.02
110 metres hurdles	Amine Bouanani; Algeria	13.60	Oyeniyi Abejoye; Nigeria	13.90	Louis-François Mendy; Senegal	14.05
400 metres hurdles	Abdelmalik Lahoulou; Algeria	49.08	Bienvenu Sawadogo; Burkina Faso	49.25 NR	Mohamed Amine Touati; Tunisia	49.29
3000 metres steeplechase	Benjamin Kigen; Kenya	8:12.39	Getnet Wale; Ethiopia	8:14.06	Soufiane El Bakkali; Morocco	8:19.45
4 × 100 metres relay	Ghana; Sean Safo-Antwi; Benjamin Azamati-Kwaku; Martin Owusu-Antwi; Joseph Amoah	38.30 GR	Nigeria; Raymond Ekevwo; Divine Oduduru; Emmanuel Arowolo; Usheoritse Itsekiri; Ogho-Oghene Egwero; Adeseye Ogunlewe	38.59	South Africa; Henricho Bruintjies; Anaso Jobodwana; Thando Dlodlo; Chederick van Wyk; Derrick Mokaleng	38.80
4 × 400 metres relay	Botswana; Zibani Ngozi; Ditiro Nzamani; Onkabetse Nkobolo; Leungo Scotch	3:02.55	South Africa; Gardeo Isaacs; Ranti Dikgale; Thapelo Phora; Derrick Mokaleng	3:03.18	Nigeria; Shedrack Akpeki; Samson Oghenewegba Nathaniel; Ifeanyi Emmanuel Ojeli; Chidi Okezie	3:03.42
20 kilometres walk	Samuel Gathimba; Kenya	1:22:48	Yohanis Algaw; Ethiopia	1:22:50	Wayne Snyman; South Africa	1:23:38
Half marathon	Titus Ekiru; Kenya	1:01:42; GR	Mohamed Reda El Aaraby; Morocco	1:02:44	Hamza Sahli; Morocco	1:02:45
High jump	Mpho Links; South Africa	2.20 m	Mathew Sawe; Kenya	2.15 m	Breyton Poole; South Africa	2.15 m
Pole vault	Hichem Khalil Cherabi; Algeria	5.00 m	Mejdi Chehata; Tunisia	4.70 m	Larbi Bourrada; Algeria	4.70 m
Long jump	Yasser Triki; Algeria	8.01 m	Marouane Kacimi; Morocco	7.79 m	Romeo N'tia; Benin	7.72 m
Triple jump	Hugues Fabrice Zango; Burkina Faso	16.88 m	Yasser Triki; Algeria	16.71 m	Jonathan Drack; Mauritius	16.53 m
Shot put	Chukwuebuka Enekwechi; Nigeria	21.48 m GR	Mohamed Magdi Hamza Khalif; Egypt	20.85 m	Mostafa Amr Hassan; Egypt	20.74 m
Discus throw	Shehab Ahmed; Egypt	59.29 m	Ayomidotun Kelvin Ogundeji; Nigeria	57.82 m	Elbachir Mbarki; Morocco	56.92 m
Hammer throw	Mostafa El Gamel; Egypt	72.50 m	Alaa El-Ashry; Egypt	72.04 m	Islam Mohamed; Egypt	71.36 m
Javelin throw	Julius Yego; Kenya	87.73 m GR	Alexander Kiprotich; Kenya	77.50 m	Nnamdi Chinecherem; Nigeria	73.24 m
Decathlon	Larbi Bourrada; Algeria	7319 pts	Moustafa Ramadan; Egypt	7099 pts	Marouane Kacimi; Morocco	6607 pts

=== Women ===
Event	Gold		Silver		Bronze	
100 metres	Marie-Josée Ta Lou; Ivory Coast	11.09	Gina Bass; The Gambia	11.13	Bassant Hemida; Egypt	11.31 NR
200 metres	Gina Bass; The Gambia	22.58 NR	Bassant Hemida; Egypt	22.89	Marie-Josée Ta Lou; Ivory Coast	23.00
400 metres	Galefele Moroko; Botswana	51.30	Favour Ofili; Nigeria	51.68	Grace Obour; Ghana	51.86
800 metres	Hirut Meshesha; Ethiopia	2:03.16	Rababe Arafi; Morocco	2:03.20	Halimah Nakaayi; Uganda	2:03.55
1500 metres	Quailyne Jebiwott Kiprop; Kenya	4:19.33	Mary Kuria; Kenya	4:20.19	Lemlem Hailu; Ethiopia	4:20.60
5000 metres	Lilian Kasait Rengeruk; Kenya	15:33.63	Hawi Feysa; Ethiopia	15:33.99	Alemitu Tariku; Ethiopia	15:37.15
10,000 metres	Tsehay Gemechu; Ethiopia	31:56.92	Zeineba Yimer; Ethiopia	31:57.95	Dera Dida; Ethiopia	31:58.78
100 metres hurdles	Tobi Amusan; Nigeria	12.68; GR	Marthe Koala; Burkina Faso	13.20	Taylon Bieldt; South Africa	13.40
400 metres hurdles	Vanice Nyagisera; Kenya	56.95	Lamiae Lhabze; Morocco	56.97	Uwemedino Abasiono Akpan; Nigeria	57.66
3000 metres steeplechase	Mekides Abebe; Ethiopia	9:35.18	Mercy Gitahi; Kenya	9:37.53	Weynshet Ansa; Ethiopia	9:38.56
4 × 100 metres relay	Nigeria; Joy Udo-Gabriel; Mercy Ntia-Obong; Jasper Bukola Adekunle; Rosemary Chukwuma; Blessing Okagbare	44.16	South Africa; Tebogo Mamathu; Tamzin Thomas; Patience Ntshingila; Taylon Bieldt; Lynique Beneke	44.61	Kenya; Maximila Imali; Milcent Ndoro; Maureen Nyatichi Thomas; Joan Cherono	45.44
4 × 400 metres relay	Nigeria; Kemi Francis; Patience Okon George; Blessing Oladoye; Favour Ofili	3:30.32	Botswana; Oarabile Babolayi; Oratile Nowe; Amantle Montsho; Galefele Moroko	3:31.96	Uganda; Stella Wonruku; Nasiba Nabirye; Emily Nanziri; Leni Shida	3:32.25
20 kilometres walk	Emily Ngii; Kenya	1:34:41; GR	Grace Wanjiru; Kenya	1:34:57	Yehualeye Beletew; Ethiopia	1:35:21
Half marathon	Yalemzerf Yehualaw; Ethiopia	1:10:26; GR	Degitu Azimeraw; Ethiopia	1:10:31	Meseret Belete; Ethiopia	1:12:08
High jump	Rose Yeboah; Ghana	1.84 m	Rhizlane Siba; Morocco	1.81 m	Ariyat Dibow Ubang; Ethiopia	1.81 m NR
Pole vault	Dora Mahfoudhi; Tunisia	4.31 m GR, NR	Fatma Elbendary; Egypt	4.10 m	Dina Eltabaa; Egypt	4.00 m
Long jump	Ese Brume; Nigeria	6.69 m	Deborah Acquah; Ghana	6.37 m	Lynique Beneke; South Africa	6.30 m
Triple jump	Grace Anigbata; Nigeria	13.75 m	Jamaa Chnaik; Morocco	13.69 m	Zinzi Chabangu; South Africa	13.59 m
Shot put	Ischke Senekal; South Africa	16.18 m	Mieke Strydom; South Africa	14.64 m	Odile Ahouanwanou; Benin	13.77 m
Discus throw	Chioma Onyekwere; Nigeria	59.91 m GR	Yolandi Stander; South Africa	57.75 m	Ischke Senekal; South Africa	53.95 m
Hammer throw	Lætitia Bambara; Burkina Faso	65.28 m	Temilola Ogunrinde; Nigeria	64.68 m	Zouina Bouzebra; Algeria	63.34 m
Javelin throw	Kelechi Nwanaga; Nigeria	55.88 m	Jo-Ane van Dyk; South Africa	55.38 m	Sunette Viljoen; South Africa	53.44 m
Heptathlon	Marthe Koala; Burkina Faso	5866 pts	Kemi Francis; Nigeria	5683 pts	Nada Chroudi; Tunisia	5302 pts

== Medal table ==
* Host nation (Morocco)

Rank	Nation	Gold	Silver	Bronze	Total
1	Kenya (KEN)	10	7	3	20
2	Nigeria (NGR)	9	7	5	21
3	Ethiopia (ETH)	5	5	8	18
4	Algeria (ALG)	5	1	2	8
5	Burkina Faso (BUR)	3	2	0	5
6	Botswana (BOT)	3	1	0	4
7	South Africa (RSA)	2	6	9	17
8	Egypt (EGY)	2	5	4	11
9	Tunisia (TUN)	2	1	2	5
10	Ghana (GHA)	2	1	1	4
11	Ivory Coast (CIV)	1	1	1	3
12	The Gambia (GAM)	1	1	0	2
13	Zambia (ZAM)	1	0	0	1
14	Morocco (MAR)*	0	6	5	11
15	Djibouti (DJI)	0	1	0	1
15	Eritrea (ERI)	0	1	0	1
17	Benin (BEN)	0	0	2	2
17	Uganda (UGA)	0	0	2	2
19	Mauritius (MRI)	0	0	1	1
19	Senegal (SEN)	0	0	1	1
Totals (20 entries)		46	46	46	138

== Schedule ==
●	1st day	●	Final day	H	Heats	Q	Qualification	S	Semifinals	F	Finals

Event↓/Date →	26th Mon		27th Tue	28th Wed	29th Thu		30th Fri
Men's 100 m	H	S	F				
Men's 200 m					H	S	F
Men's 400 m	H		S	F			
Men's 800 m	H		S	F			
Men's 1500 m							F
Men's 5000 m							F
Men's 10,000 m			F				
Men's 110 m hurdles	H		F				
Men's 400 m hurdles				H	F		
Men's 3000 m steeplechase	F						
Men's 4 × 100 m relay			H	F			
Men's 4 × 400 m relay							F
Men's half marathon							F
Men's 20 km walk				F			
Men's high jump							F
Men's pole vault					F		
Men's long jump				Q			F
Men's triple jump			F				
Men's shot put			F				
Men's discus throw	F						
Men's hammer throw					F		
Men's javelin throw							F
Men's decathlon	●		●				
Women's 100 m	H	S	F				
Women's 200 m					H	S	F
Women's 400 m	H		S	F			
Women's 800 m	H		F				
Women's 1500 m							F
Women's 5000 m	F						
Women's 10,000 m					F		
Women's 100 m hurdles			H	F			
Women's 400 m hurdles					H		F
Women's 3000 m steeplechase				F			
Women's 4 × 100 m relay			H	F			
Women's 4 × 400 m relay							F
Women's half marathon							F
Women's 20 km walk				F			
Women's high jump			F				
Women's pole vault			F				
Women's long jump					F		
Women's triple jump	F						
Women's shot put							F
Women's discus throw					F		
Women's hammer throw			F				
Women's javelin throw				F			
Women's heptathlon				●	●		

== Participating nations ==
- Algeria (11)
- Angola (3)
- Benin (5)
- Botswana (23)
- Burkina Faso (15)
- Burundi (7)
- Cameroon (13)
- Cape Verde (5)
- Central African Republic (1)
- Chad (6)
- Democratic Republic of the Congo (8)
- Djibouti (9)
- Egypt (30)
- Equatorial Guinea (6)
- Eritrea (15)
- Eswatini (3)
- Ethiopia (80)
- Gabon (2)
- The Gambia (9)
- Ghana (16)
- Guinea (3)
- Ivory Coast (11)
- Kenya (69)
- Lesotho (7)
- Liberia (1)
- Libya (2)
- Madagascar (4)
- Malawi (7)
- Mali (11)
- Mauritania (1)
- Mauritius (13)
- Morocco (44)
- Mozambique (2)
- Namibia (17)
- Niger (3)
- Nigeria (48)
- Republic of the Congo (10)
- Rwanda (2)
- São Tomé and Príncipe (4)
- Senegal (13)
- Seychelles (8)
- Sierra Leone (10)
- Somalia (2)
- South Africa (33)
- South Sudan (8)
- Sudan (4)
- Tanzania (6)
- Togo (6)
- Tunisia (14)
- Uganda (25)
- Zambia (7)
- Zimbabwe (15)
