= Eritrea at the 2019 African Games =

- Flag of Eritrea
- IOC code: ERI
- NOC: Eritrean National Olympic Committee

in Rabat, Morocco 19 August 2019 – 31 August 2019
- Competitors: 51 (30 men and 21 women) in 6 sports
- Medals Ranked 26th: Gold 0 Silver 3 Bronze 0 Total 3

African Games appearances
- 2007; 2011; 2015; 2019; 2023

Eritrea competed at the 2019 African Games held from 19 to 31 August 2019 in Rabat, Morocco. Athletes representing the country won three silver medals and the country finished in 26th place in the medal table.

== Medal summary ==
=== Medal table ===
Medal	Name	Sport	Event	Date
Silver	Men's team	Cycling	Men's Team Time Trial	24 August
Silver	Women's team	Cycling	Women's Team Time Trial	24 August
Silver	Aron Kifle	Athletics	Men's 10,000 metres	27 August

Medals by sport
Sport	1st place, gold medalist(s)	2nd place, silver medalist(s)	3rd place, bronze medalist(s)	Total
Athletics	0	1	0	1
Cycling	0	2	0	2
Total	0	3	0	3

== Athletics ==
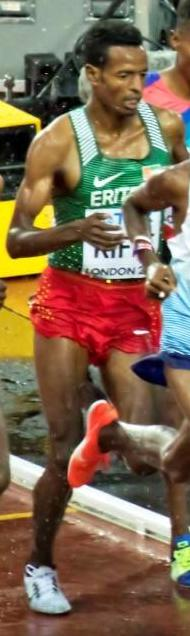
Aron Kifle (2017)

Aron Kifle won the silver medal in the men's 10,000 metres event, the only medal won by athletes representing Eritrea in athletics.

Semere Mihret competed in the men's 800 metres event. He did not advance to the semifinals.

Meron Goitom competed in the men's 1500 metres event. He did not advance to the final.

Tesfu Tewelde competed in the men's 5000 metres event. He finished in 17th place.

Nyat Ghebreslassie competed in the women's 800 metres event. She did not advance to the final.

Rahel Daniel competed in the women's 1500 metres event. She finished in 10th place in the final.

Dolshi Tesfu competed in the women's half marathon. She finished in 10th place.

Kokob Tesfagabriel competed in the women's half marathon. She finished in 12th place.

== Badminton ==
Eritrea competed in badminton with four players.

Filmon Abraha and Leykun Semere competed in the men's singles event. Together they also competed in the men's doubles event.

Kisanet Heyelom and Yodit Zomuy competed in the women's singles event. Together they also competed in the women's doubles event.

All four also competed in the mixed team event.

== Chess ==
Four chess players represented Eritrea: Yohana Brhane, Mekonnen Habtemichael, Merhawit Zemichael and Asante Zerabruk. In the mixed team event Eritrea finished in 19th place.

== Cycling ==
Eritrea won the silver medal in both the Men's and Women's Team Time Trial events.

== Swimming ==
Four swimmers represented Eritrea in swimming.

Ghirmai Efrem competed in the Men's 50 metres butterfly, Men's 50 metres backstroke and Men's 50 metres freestyle events.

Daniel Christian competed in the Men's 100 metres butterfly and the Men's 100 metres freestyle events.

Solomon Beraki competed in the Men's 800 metres freestyle event.

Nejim Tesfay also competed in the Men's 800 metres freestyle event.

== Table tennis ==
Eritrea competed in table tennis events without winning a medal.
