= 2020 in the sport of athletics =

- Major world events: 2020 Olympic Games

In 2020, the foremost competitions in the sport of athletics were the 2020 Summer Olympics held in Tokyo, the 2020 World Athletics Indoor Championships held in Nanjing, China and the 2020 IAAF World Half Marathon Championships held in Gdynia, Poland. All three were rescheduled due to the COVID-19 pandemicm with the 2020 IAAF World Half Marathon Championships being the only event still held in 2020.

== Major championships ==
=== World ===
- Olympic Games
- Paralympic Games
- World Half Marathon Championships
- World U20 Championships
- World Mountain Running Championships

=== Regional ===
- African Championships
- Asian Indoor Championships
- European Championships
- European Throwing Cup
- CARIFTA Games
- South American Indoor Championships
- Pan American Cross Country Cup

=== World and continental athletics events ===
- February 15: 2020 Balkan Athletics Indoor Championships in Istanbul
  - 60 m winners: (Greece) Konstantinos Zikos (m) / (Israel) Diana Vaisman (f)
  - 400 m winners: (Ukraine) Ivan Budzynskyi (m) / (Romania) Andrea Miklós (f)
  - 800 m winners: (Ukraine) Yevhen Hutsol (m) / (Romania) Cristina Daniela Bălan (f)
  - 1500 m winners: (Serbia) Elzan Bibić (m) / (Romania) Roxana Bârcă (f)
  - 3000 m winners: (Austria) Andreas Vojta (m) / (Albania) Luiza Gega (f)
  - 60 m Hurdles winners: (Turkey) Mikdat Sevler (m) / (Croatia) Ivana Lončarek (f)
  - Long Jump winners: (Albania) Izmir Smajlaj (m) / (Romania) Florentina Iusco (f)
  - Triple Jump winners: (Azerbaijan) Nazim Babayev (m) / (Romania) Elena Panțuroiu (f)
  - High Jump winners: (Ukraine) Dmytro Nikitin (m) / (Ukraine) Yuliya Chumachenko (f)
  - Pole Vault winners: (Turkey) Ersu Şaşma (m) / (Ukraine) Iana Gladiichuk (f)
  - Shot Put winners: (Bosnia and Herzegovina) Mesud Pezer (m) / (Moldova) Dimitriana Surdu (f)
  - 4 × 400 m winners: Slovenia (m) / Turkey (f)
- March 7: 2020 World University Cross Country Championships in (Morocco) Marrakesh
- March 29: 2020 IAAF World Half Marathon Championships in (Poland) Gdynia
- May 2 & 3: 2020 World Athletics Race Walking Team Championships in (Belarus) Minsk
- July 7–12: 2020 World Athletics U20 Championships in (Kenya) Nairobi
- July 16–19: 2020 European Athletics U18 Championships in (Italy) Rieti
- August 26–30: 2020 European Athletics Championships in (France) Paris
- December 13: 2020 European Cross Country Championships in (Republic of Ireland) Dublin

== Annual competitions ==
- Diamond League
- Continental Tour
- IAAF Hammer Throw Challenge
- World Marathon Majors
  - Tokyo Marathon
  - Boston Marathon (cancelled due to the COVID-19 pandemic)
  - London Marathon
  - Berlin Marathon (cancelled due to the COVID-19 pandemic)
  - Chicago Marathon (cancelled due to the COVID-19 pandemic)
  - New York City Marathon (cancelled due to the COVID-19 pandemic)
- IAAF Road Race Label Events

== Season's bests ==
Best marks of the year
Event	Men			Women		
Event	Athlete	Mark	Notes	Athlete	Mark	Notes
60 metres	(25x17px)			(25x17px)		
100 metres	(25x17px)			(25x17px)		
200 metres	(25x17px)			(25x17px)		
400 metres	(25x17px)			(25x17px)		
800 metres	(25x17px)			(25x17px)		
1500 metres	(25x17px)			(25x17px)		
3000 metres	(25x17px)			(25x17px)		
5000 metres	(25x17px)			(25x17px)		
10,000 metres	(25x17px)			(25x17px)		
60 metres hurdles	(25x17px)			(25x17px)		
100/110 metres hurdles	(25x17px)			(25x17px)		
400 metres hurdles	(25x17px)			(25x17px)		
3000 metres steeplechase	(25x17px)			(25x17px)		
10 kilometres	(25x17px)			(25x17px)		
15 kilometres	(25x17px)			(25x17px)		
20 kilometres	(25x17px)			(25x17px)		
Half marathon	(25x17px)			(25x17px)		
25 kilometres	(25x17px)			(25x17px)		
30 kilometres	(25x17px)			(25x17px)		
Marathon	(25x17px)			(25x17px)		
20 kilometres race walk	(25x17px)			(25x17px)		
50 kilometres race walk	(25x17px)			(25x17px)		
Pole vault	(25x17px)	m		(25x17px)	m	
High jump	(25x17px)	m		(25x17px)	m	
Long jump	(25x17px)	m		(25x17px)	m	
Triple jump	(25x17px)	m		(25x17px)	m	
Shot put	(25x17px)	m		(25x17px)	m	
Discus throw	(25x17px)	m		(25x17px)	m	
Javelin throw	(25x17px)	m		(25x17px)	m	
Hammer throw	(25x17px)	m		(25x17px)	m	
Pentathlon	—			(25x17px)	pts	
Heptathlon	(25x17px)	pts		(25x17px)	pts	
Decathlon	(25x17px)	pts		—		
4 × 100 metres relay	[[|]] ()			[[|]] ()		
4 × 400 metres relay	[[|]] ()			[[|]] ()		

== Outdoor season's top ten performers ==
All information on the season's top ten performers in outdoor events is published by World Athletics.

=== 100 metres ===
Men
Rank	Result	Athlete	Nation
1	9.86	Michael Norman	United States
2	9.90	Trayvon Bromell	United States
3	9.91	Akani Simbine	South Africa
4	9.97	Andre De Grasse	Canada
5	10.00	Ronnie Baker	United States
6	10.03	Julian Forte	Jamaica
6	10.03	Rai Benjamin	United States
6	10.03	Asuka Cambridge	Japan
9	10.04	Noah Lyles	United States
9	10.04	Yoshihide Kiryū	Japan
9	10.04	Andre Ewers	Jamaica
9	10.04	Kyree King	United States
9	10.04	Arthur Cissé	Ivory Coast

Women
Rank	Result	Athlete	Nation
1	10.85	Elaine Thompson-Herah	Jamaica
2	10.86	Shelly-Ann Fraser-Pryce	Jamaica
3	10.95	Sha'Carri Richardson	United States
4	10.98	Shaunae Miller-Uibo	Bahamas
5	11.08	Ajla Del Ponte	Switzerland
6	11.11	Rebekka Haase	Germany
7	11.12	Aleia Hobbs	United States
8	11.14	Hannah Cunliffe	United States
8	11.14	Marie-Josée Ta Lou	Ivory Coast
10	11.15	Tamari Davis	United States

=== 200 metres ===
Men
Rank	Result	Athlete	Nation
1	19.76	Noah Lyles	United States
2	19.80	Kenny Bednarek	United States
3	19.96	Steven Gardiner	Bahamas
4	20.22	Divine Oduduru	Nigeria
5	20.23	Clarence Munyai	South Africa
5	20.23	Arthur Cissé	Ivory Coast
7	20.24	Andre De Grasse	Canada
7	20.24	Josephus Lyles	United States
7	20.24	Aaron Brown	Canada
7	20.24	William Reais	Switzerland

Women
Rank	Result	Athlete	Nation
1	21.98	Shaunae Miller-Uibo	Bahamas
2	22.00	Sha'Carri Richardson	United States
3	22.19	Elaine Thompson-Herah	Jamaica
4	22.45	Jasmine Camacho-Quinn	Puerto Rico
5	22.47	Lynna Irby	United States
6	22.57	Shelly-Ann Fraser-Pryce	Jamaica
7	22.63	Gabrielle Thomas	United States
8	22.66	Lieke Klaver	Netherlands
9	22.67	Anthonique Strachan	Bahamas
10	22.69	Ge Manqi	China

=== 400 metres ===
Men
Rank	Result	Athlete	Nation
1	44.91	Justin Robinson	United States
2	44.98	Michael Cherry	United States
3	45.05	Karsten Warholm	Norway
4	45.07	Akeem Bloomfield	Jamaica
5	45.21	Edoardo Scotti	Italy
6	45.25	Yousef Karam	Kuwait
7	45.31	Davide Re	Italy
8	45.37	Steven Solomon	Australia
9	45.40	Josephus Lyles	United States
10	45.46	Ludvy Vaillant	France

Women
Rank	Result	Athlete	Nation
1	50.42	Beatrice Masilingi	Namibia
2	50.50	Lynna Irby	United States
3	50.52	Shaunae Miller-Uibo	Bahamas
4	50.98	Lieke Klaver	Netherlands
5	51.13	Femke Bol	Netherlands
6	51.22	Amantle Montsho	Botswana
7	51.23	Wadeline Jonathas	United States
8	51.33	Justyna Święty-Ersetic	Poland
9	51.35	Lada Vondrová	Czech Republic
10	51.51	Polina Miller	Russia

=== 800 metres ===
Men
Rank	Result	Athlete	Nation
1	1:43.15	Donavan Brazier	United States
2	1:43.23	Bryce Hoppel	United States
3	1:44.09	Daniel Rowden	United Kingdom
4	1:44.14	Marco Arop	Canada
5	1:44.16	Ferguson Rotich	Kenya
6	1:44.18	Jake Wightman	United Kingdom
7	1:44.47	Andreas Kramer	Sweden
8	1:44.51	Amel Tuka	Bosnia and Herzegovina
9	1:44.56	Benjamin Robert	France
9	1:44.56	Elliot Giles	United Kingdom

Women
Rank	Result	Athlete	Nation
1	1:57.68	Faith Kipyegon	Kenya
2	1:58.10	Hedda Hynne	Norway
3	1:58.37	Selina Rutz-Büchel	Switzerland
4	1:58.50	Lore Hoffmann	Switzerland
5	1:58.63	Jemma Reekie	United Kingdom
6	1:58.84	Laura Muir	United Kingdom
7	1:58.92	Rose Mary Almanza	Cuba
8	1:59.22	Esther Guerrero	Spain
9	1:59.69	Ciara Mageean	Ireland
10	1:59.87	Adelle Tracey	United Kingdom

=== 1500 metres ===
Men
Rank	Result	Athlete	Nation
1	3:28.45	Timothy Cheruiyot	Kenya
2	3:28.68	Jakob Ingebrigtsen	Norway
3	3:29.47	Jake Wightman	United Kingdom
4	3:30.35	Filip Ingebrigtsen	Norway
5	3:30.51	Stewart McSweyn	Australia
6	3:32.69	Yomif Kejelcha	Ethiopia
7	3:32.97	Selemon Barega	Ethiopia
8	3:33.07	Jesús Gómez	Spain
9	3:33.45	Soufiane El Bakkali	Morocco
10	3:33.72	Ignacio Fontes	Spain

Women
Rank	Result	Athlete	Nation
1	3:57.40	Laura Muir	United Kingdom
2	3:59.05	Faith Kipyegon	Kenya
3	3:59.70	Sofia Ennaoui	Poland
4	4:00.02	Karissa Schweizer	United States
5	4:00.09	Laura Weightman	United Kingdom
6	4:00.42	Jessica Hull	Australia
7	4:00.77	Elle Purrier St. Pierre	United States
8	4:01.31	Claudia Bobocea	Romania
9	4:01.81	Melissa Courtney-Bryant	United Kingdom
10	4:02.20	Jemma Reekie	United Kingdom

=== 5000 metres ===
Men
Rank	Result	Athlete	Nation
1	12:35.36	Joshua Cheptegei	Uganda
2	12:47.20	Mohammed Ahmed	Canada
3	12:48.63	Jacob Kiplimo	Uganda
4	12:49.08	Selemon Barega	Ethiopia
5	12:51.78	Nicholas Kimeli	Kenya
6	12:58.78	Lopez Lomong	United States
7	13:02.26	Yemaneberhan Crippa	Italy
8	13:08.91	Berihu Aregawi	Ethiopia
9	13:09.83	Stewart McSweyn	Australia
10	13:10.64	Jonathan Ndiku	Kenya

Women
Rank	Result	Athlete	Nation
1	14:06.62	Letesenbet Gidey	Ethiopia
2	14:22.12	Hellen Obiri	Kenya
3	14:23.92	Shelby Houlihan	United States
4	14:26.34	Karissa Schweizer	United States
5	14:35.44	Laura Weightman	United Kingdom
6	14:37.85	Sifan Hassan	Netherlands
7	14:40.51	Sheila Chelangat	Kenya
8	14:40.70	Yasemin Can	Turkey
9	14:43.80	Jessica Hull	Australia
10	14:45.11	Shannon Rowbury	United States

=== 10,000 metres ===
Men
Rank	Result	Athlete	Nation
1	26:11.00	Joshua Cheptegei	Uganda
2	26:58.97	Nicholas Kimeli	Kenya
3	27:01.42	Richard Yator	Kenya
4	27:01.95	Jonathan Ndiku	Kenya
5	27:02.39	Benard Kibet	Kenya
6	27:02.80	Bedan Karoki Muchiri	Kenya
7	27:18.75	Akira Aizawa	Japan
8	27:20.34	Cleophas Kandie Meyan	Kenya
9	27:22.06	Eric Jenkins	United States
10	27:22.55	Patrick Tiernan	Australia

Women
Rank	Result	Athlete	Nation
1	29:36.67	Sifan Hassan	Netherlands
2	30:20.44	Hitomi Niiya	Japan
3	30:38.18	Rosemary Wanjiru	Kenya
4	30:57.73	Tsehay Gemechu	Ethiopia
5	31:06.46	Sarah Chelangat	Uganda
6	31:08.09	Evaline Chirchir	Kenya
7	31:09.79	Rachel Schneider	United States
8	31:10.08	Weini Frezghi	United States
9	31:10.84	Alicia Monson	United States
10	31:11.07	Sharon Lokedi	Kenya

=== 110/100 metres hurdles ===
Men
Rank	Result	Athlete	Nation
1	13.11	Orlando Ortega	Spain
2	13.14	Andrew Pozzi	United Kingdom
3	13.15	Aaron Mallett	United States
4	13.18	Wilhem Belocian	France
5	13.19	Grant Holloway	United States
6	13.24	Xie Wenjun	China
7	13.27	Taio Kanai	Japan
8	13.29	Jason Joseph	Switzerland
9	13.30	Freddie Crittenden	United States
10	13.31	Sergey Shubenkov	Russia

Women
Rank	Result	Athlete	Nation
1	12.68	Nadine Visser	Netherlands
2	12.71	Luca Kozák	Hungary
3	12.73	Elvira Herman	Belarus
3	12.73	Cyréna Samba-Mayela	France
5	12.76	Annimari Korte	Finland
6	12.78	Payton Chadwick	United States
7	12.79	Luminosa Bogliolo	Italy
8	12.82	Britany Anderson	Jamaica
9	12.84	Nooralotta Neziri	Finland
10	12.86	Taliyah Brooks	United States

=== 400 metres hurdles ===
Men
Rank	Result	Athlete	Nation
1	46.87	Karsten Warholm	Norway
2	48.69	Ludvy Vaillant	France
3	48.72	Rasmus Mägi	Estonia
4	49.04	Yasmani Copello	Turkey
5	49.11	Wilfried Happio	France
6	49.12	Tatsuhiro Yamamoto	Japan
7	49.19	Kazuki Kurokawa	Japan
8	49.31	Takatoshi Abe	Japan
9	49.33	Mehdi Pirjahan	Iran
10	49.35	David Kendziera	United States

Women
Rank	Result	Athlete	Nation
1	53.79	Femke Bol	Netherlands
2	54.54	Anna Ryzhykova	Ukraine
3	54.93	Viktoriya Tkachuk	Ukraine
4	54.98	Léa Sprunger	Switzerland
5	55.09	Sarah Carli	Australia
6	55.19	Emma Zapletalová	Slovakia
7	55.20	Sara Slott Petersen	Denmark
8	55.27	Jessie Knight	United Kingdom
8	55.27	Amalie Iuel	Norway
10	55.40	Ronda Whyte	Jamaica
10	55.40	Janieve Russell	Jamaica
10	55.40	Ayomide Folorunso	Italy

=== 3000 metres steeplechase ===
Men
Rank	Result	Athlete	Nation
1	8:08.04	Soufiane El Bakkali	Morocco
2	8:08.78	Leonard Bett	Kenya
3	8:13.43	Djilali Bedrani	France
4	8:13.45	Fernando Carro	Spain
5	8:16.25	Matthew Hughes	Canada
6	8:16.57	Topi Raitanen	Finland
7	8:17.60	Abraham Kibiwot	Kenya
8	8:19.37	Ryuji Miura	Japan
9	8:19.40	Daniel Arce	Spain
10	8:19.60	Philemon Kiplagat Ruto	Kenya

Women
Rank	Result	Athlete	Nation
1	9:06.14	Hyvin Kiyeng Jepkemoi	Kenya
2	9:10.07	Beatrice Chepkoech	Kenya
3	9:16.84	Yekaterina Ivonina	Russia
4	9:20.68	Maruša Mišmaš-Zrimšek	Slovenia
5	9:23.86	Olga Vovk	Russia
6	9:27.35	Natalya Aristarkhova	Russia
7	9:28.12	Anna Tropina	Russia
8	9:30.73	Aimee Pratt	United Kingdom
9	9:32.90	Stella Rutto	Kenya
10	9:32.95	Rosie Clarke	United Kingdom

=== Half marathon ===
Men
Rank	Result	Athlete	Nation
1	57:32	Kibiwott Kandie	Kenya
2	57:37	Jacob Kiplimo	Uganda
3	57:49	Rhonex Kipruto	Kenya
4	57:59	Alexander Mutiso	Kenya
5	58:11	Philemon Kiplimo	Kenya
6	58:42	Kelvin Kiptum	Kenya
7	58:53	Amedework Walelegn	Ethiopia
8	58:54	Andamlak Belihu	Ethiopia
9	58:56	Stephen Kissa	Uganda
10	59:04	Muktar Edris	Ethiopia

Women
Rank	Result	Athlete	Nation
1	1:04:31	Ababel Yeshaneh	Ethiopia
2	1:04:46	Yalemzerf Yehualaw	Ethiopia
3	1:04:49	Brigid Kosgei	Kenya
4	1:05:06	Ruth Chepng'etich	Kenya
5	1:05:16	Peres Jepchirchir	Kenya
6	1:05:18	Melat Yisak Kejeta	Germany
6	1:05:18	Genzebe Dibaba	Ethiopia
8	1:05:34	Rosemary Wanjiru	Kenya
9	1:05:39	Zeineba Yimer	Ethiopia
9	1:05:39	Sheila Chepkirui	Kenya

=== Marathon ===
Men
Rank	Result	Athlete	Nation
1	2:03:00	Evans Chebet	Kenya
2	2:03:04	Lawrence Cherono	Kenya
3	2:03:16	Birhanu Legese	Ethiopia
4	2:03:30	Amos Kipruto	Kenya
5	2:04:12	Reuben Kiprop Kipyego	Kenya
6	2:04:46	Mekuant Ayenew Gebre	Ethiopia
7	2:04:49	Bashir Abdi	Belgium
8	2:04:51	Sisay Lemma	Ethiopia
9	2:04:53	Deso Gelmisa	Ethiopia
10	2:05:05	Barnabas Kiptum	Kenya
10	2:05:05	Abel Kirui	Kenya

Women
Rank	Result	Athlete	Nation
1	2:17:16	Peres Jepchirchir	Kenya
2	2:17:45	Lonah Chemtai Salpeter	Israel
3	2:18:35	Birhane Dibaba	Ethiopia
4	2:18:40	Joyciline Jepkosgei	Kenya
5	2:18:58	Brigid Kosgei	Kenya
6	2:19:38	Worknesh Degefa	Ethiopia
7	2:19:52	Helalia Johannes	Namibia
8	2:19:54	Zeineba Yimer	Ethiopia
9	2:19:56	Degitu Azimeraw	Ethiopia
9	2:19:56	Tigist Girma	Ethiopia

=== Pole vault ===
Men
Rank	Result	Athlete	Nation
2	6.02	Sam Kendricks	United States
3	5.90	Jacob Wooten	United States
3	5.90	Matt Ludwig	United States
3	5.90	Piotr Lisek	Poland
6	5.85	Harry Coppell	United Kingdom
7	5.82	Audie Wyatt	United States
7	5.82	KC Lightfoot	United States
7	5.82	Claudio Stecchi	Italy
7	5.82	Thiago Braz	Brazil
7	5.82	Renaud Lavillenie	France

Women
Rank	Result	Athlete	Nation
1	4.92	Katie Nageotte	United States
2	4.83	Michaela Meijer	Sweden
3	4.80	Anzhelika Sidorova	Russia
4	4.75	Tina Šutej	Slovenia
5	4.73	Holly Bradshaw	United Kingdom
5	4.73	Angelica Bengtsson	Sweden
7	4.72	Iryna Zhuk	Belarus
7	4.72	Nina Kennedy	Australia
9	4.70	Eleni-Klaoudia Polak	Greece
9	4.70	Sandi Morris	United States

=== High jump ===
Men
Rank	Result	Athlete	Nation
1	2.33	Maksim Nedasekau	Belarus
2	2.31	Tomohiro Shinno	Japan
3	2.30	Jamal Wilson	Bahamas
3	2.30	Brandon Starc	Australia
3	2.30	Woo Sang-hyeok	South Korea
3	2.30	Gianmarco Tamberi	Italy
3	2.30	Loïc Gasch	Switzerland
3	2.30	Ilya Ivanyuk	Russia
3	2.30	Andriy Protsenko	Ukraine
10	2.28	Mateusz Przybylko	Germany
10	2.28	Norbert Kobielski	Poland
10	2.28	Keitaro Fujita	Japan
10	2.28	Ryoichi Akamatsu	Japan

Women
Rank	Result	Athlete	Nation
1	2.00	Yuliya Levchenko	Ukraine
1	2.00	Yaroslava Mahuchikh	Ukraine
3	1.99	Eleanor Patterson	Australia
4	1.98	Nicola McDermott	Australia
5	1.97	Mariya Lasitskene	Russia
6	1.95	Erika Kinsey	Sweden
7	1.94	Erika Furlani	Italy
8	1.92	Lia Apostolovski	Slovenia
8	1.92	Oksana Okunyeva	Ukraine
10	1.91	Bára Sajdoková	Czech Republic
10	1.91	Ioanna Zakka	Greece
10	1.91	Alina Shukh	Ukraine

=== Long jump ===
Men
Rank	Result	Athlete	Nation
1	8.36	Wang Jianan	China
2	8.33	Huang Changzhou	China
3	8.29	Yuki Hashioka	Japan
4	8.28	Lester Lescay	Cuba
5	8.27	Kristian Pulli	Finland
6	8.26	Maykel Massó	Cuba
7	8.25	Juan Miguel Echevarría	Cuba
8	8.23	Tajay Gayle	Jamaica
9	8.20	Darcy Roper	Australia
9	8.20	Cheswill Johnson	South Africa

Women
Rank	Result	Athlete	Nation
1	7.03	Malaika Mihambo	Germany
2	6.94	Nastassia Mironchyk-Ivanova	Belarus
3	6.92	Khaddi Sagnia	Sweden
4	6.91	Maryna Bekh-Romanchuk	Ukraine
5	6.80	Ivana Španović	Serbia
5	6.80	Larissa Iapichino	Italy
7	6.71	Spyridoula Karydi	Greece
7	6.71	Ese Brume	Nigeria
7	6.71	Brooke Stratton	Australia
10	6.69	Jazmin Sawyers	United Kingdom
10	6.69	Alina Rotaru	Romania

=== Triple jump ===
Men
Rank	Result	Athlete	Nation
1	17.57	Christian Taylor	United States
2	17.43	Hugues Fabrice Zango	Burkina Faso
3	17.30	Andy Díaz	Cuba
4	17.28	Pedro Pichardo	Portugal
5	17.18	Cristian Nápoles	Cuba
6	17.17	Max Heß	Germany
7	17.09	Pablo Torrijos	Spain
8	17.08	Lázaro Martínez	Cuba
9	17.05	Henry D. Rosique	Cuba
10	17.04	Omar Craddock	United States

Women
Rank	Result	Athlete	Nation
1	14.71	Yulimar Rojas	Venezuela
2	14.56	Ekaterina Koneva	Russia
3	14.55	Liadagmis Povea	Cuba
4	14.43	Shanieka Ricketts	Jamaica
5	14.38	Gabriela Petrova	Bulgaria
6	14.34	Davisleydi Velazco	Cuba
7	14.30	Kristiina Mäkelä	Finland
8	14.26	Patrícia Mamona	Portugal
9	14.24	Iryna Vaskouskaya	Belarus
10	14.22	Neja Filipič	Slovenia

=== Shot put ===
Men
Rank	Result	Athlete	Nation
1	22.91	Ryan Crouser	United States
2	21.99	Leonardo Fabbri	Italy
3	21.88	Michał Haratyk	Poland
4	21.72	Nick Ponzio	United States
5	21.70	Tom Walsh	New Zealand
6	21.69	Filip Mihaljević	Croatia
7	21.52	Darlan Romani	Brazil
8	21.30	Joe Kovacs	United States
9	21.29	Mohamed Magdi Hamza	Egypt
10	21.24	Tomáš Staněk	Czech Republic

Women
Rank	Result	Athlete	Nation
1	19.53	Auriol Dongmo	Portugal
1	19.53	Gong Lijiao	China
3	19.41	Chase Ealey	United States
4	19.27	Aliona Dubitskaya	Belarus
5	19.18	Danniel Thomas-Dodd	Jamaica
6	18.88	Brittany Crew	Canada
7	18.84	Sarah Mitton	Canada
8	18.81	Valerie Adams	New Zealand
9	18.77	Fanny Roos	Sweden
10	18.64	Jessica Ramsey	United States

=== Discus throw ===
Men
Rank	Result	Athlete	Nation
1	71.37	Daniel Ståhl	Sweden
2	70.29	Mauricio Ortega	Colombia
3	69.67	Fedrick Dacres	Jamaica
4	69.60	Juan Caicedo	Ecuador
5	69.35	Guðni Valur Guðnason	Iceland
6	68.75	Kristjan Čeh	Slovenia
7	68.68	Andrius Gudžius	Lithuania
8	68.63	Lukas Weißhaidinger	Austria
9	67.72	Simon Pettersson	Sweden
10	66.54	Chad Wright	Jamaica

Women
Rank	Result	Athlete	Nation
1	70.15	Valarie Allman	United States
2	65.93	Sandra Perković	Croatia
3	65.58	Kristin Pudenz	Germany
4	65.26	Chen Yang	China
5	64.76	Yaime Pérez	Cuba
6	64.14	Mélina Robert-Michon	France
7	64.09	Feng Bin	China
8	64.03	Shanice Craft	Germany
9	63.90	Yekaterina Strokova	Russia
10	63.71	Denia Caballero	Cuba

=== Javelin throw ===
Men
Rank	Result	Athlete	Nation
1	97.76	Johannes Vetter	Germany
2	87.86	Neeraj Chopra	India
3	87.07	Marcin Krukowski	Poland
4	86.49	Kim Amb	Sweden
5	86.05	Aliaksei Katkavets	Belarus
6	85.80	Rocco van Rooyen	South Africa
7	85.54	Cheng Chao-tsun	Chinese Taipei
8	85.47	Shivpal Singh	India
9	85.24	Andreas Hofmann	Germany
10	84.56	Gatis Čakšs	Latvia

Women
Rank	Result	Athlete	Nation
1	67.61	Lü Huihui	China
2	67.29	Liu Shiying	China
3	67.17	Tatsiana Khaladovich	Belarus
4	65.70	Maria Andrejczyk	Poland
5	65.19	Barbora Špotáková	Czech Republic
6	64.44	Kara Winger	United States
7	64.22	Nikola Ogrodníková	Czech Republic
8	64.10	Christin Hussong	Germany
9	63.96	Elina Tzengko	Greece
10	63.45	Haruka Kitaguchi	Japan

=== Hammer throw ===
Men
Rank	Result	Athlete	Nation
1	80.70	Rudy Winkler	United States
2	80.28	Wojciech Nowicki	Poland
3	79.88	Bence Halász	Hungary
4	79.81	Paweł Fajdek	Poland
5	79.05	Aaron Kangas	Finland
6	77.78	Mykhaylo Kokhan	Ukraine
7	77.56	Eşref Apak	Turkey
8	77.52	Javier Cienfuegos	Spain
9	77.33	Özkan Baltacı	Turkey
10	77.31	Aleksey Sokirskiy	Russia

Women
Rank	Result	Athlete	Nation
1	75.45	Hanna Malyshchyk	Belarus
2	75.23	Alexandra Tavernier	France
3	74.18	Malwina Kopron	Poland
4	73.61	Katarzyna Furmanek	Poland
5	73.55	Sofiya Palkina	Russia
6	73.47	Lauren Bruce	New Zealand
7	73.01	Iryna Klymets	Ukraine
8	72.90	Zalina Petrivskaya	Moldova
9	72.61	Iryna Novozhylova	Ukraine
10	72.35	Julia Ratcliffe	New Zealand

=== Decathlon/Heptathlon ===
Men
Rank	Result	Athlete	Nation
1	8552	Kevin Mayer	France
2	8492	Ashley Moloney	Australia
3	8367	Cedric Dubler	Australia
4	8364	Felipe Dos Santos	Brazil
5	8260	Axel Hubert	France
6	8231	Simon Ehammer	Switzerland
7	8202	Vital Zhuk	Belarus
8	8133	Risto Lillemets	Estonia
9	8100	Maksim Andraloits	Belarus
10	8086	Taavi Tšernjavski	Estonia

Women
Rank	Result	Athlete	Nation
1	6419	Ivona Dadic	Austria
2	6386	Alina Shukh	Ukraine
3	6319	Carolin Schäfer	Germany
4	6304	Adriana Rodríguez	Cuba
5	6263	Xénia Krizsán	Hungary
6	6254	Evelis Aguilar	Colombia
7	6192	Rita Nemes	Hungary
8	6170	Annik Kälin	Switzerland
9	6167	Hanne Maudens	Belgium
10	6112	Anna Maiwald	Germany

== Competitions winners ==
=== 2019–2020 EA Cross Country Permit Meetings ===
- September 28, 2019: TCS Lidingöloppet in (Sweden) Lidingö (CC #1)
  - Winners: (Sweden) Robel Fsiha (m) / (Kenya) Sylvia Medugu (f)
- November 24, 2019: Cross de l'Acier in (France) Leffrinckoucke (CC #2)
  - Winners: (Ethiopia) Berihu Aregawi (m) / (Ethiopia) Aberash Belay (f)
- November 24, 2019: International Warandecross Tilburg in Netherlands (CC #3)
  - Winners: (Netherlands) Mike Foppen (m) / (Germany) Anna Emilie Møller (f)
- December 1, 2019: Cross Internacional de la Constitución in (Spain) Aranda de Duero (CC #4)
  - Winners: (Burundi) Thierry Ndikumwenayo (m) / (Spain) Marta Pérez (f)
