= Omondi =

Omondi is both a surname and a given name. It is most common with the Luo Tribe in East Africa. The name itself is given to Male children born early in the morning. Amondi is a female version of the name.

People with this name include:

== Footballers ==
- Eric Johana Omondi (born 1994), Kenyan footballer
- Eric Omondi Ongao (born 1977), Kenyan footballer
- Evans Omondi, Kenyan footballer
- Jacob Omondi, Kenyan footballer
- James Omondi (born 1980), Kenyan footballer and manager
- Kevin Omondi (born 1990), Kenyan footballer
- Marvin Omondi, Kenyan footballer
- Phillip Omondi (1957–1999), Ugandan footballer and manager
- Tyrus Omondi (born 1994), Kenyan footballer

== Others ==
- Michael Omondi (1961–2008), Kenyan field hockey player
- Recho Omondi (born 1987), American fashion designer and podcaster
- Ted Omondi (born 1984), Kenyan rugby union player
