= Delhi Half Marathon =

Annual half marathon

- The logo for Delhi Half Marathon
- Date: late October or early November
- Location: Jawaharlal Nehru Stadium, Delhi
- Event type: Road
- Distance: Half marathon
- Primary sponsor: Vedanta
- Established: 2005
- Course records: Men: 58:536 (Ethiopia) Amedework Walelegn (2020); Women: 1:04:46 (Ethiopia) Yalemzerf Yehualaw (2020)
- Website: Delhi Half Marathon

Delhi Half Marathon, currently branded as the Vedanta Delhi Half Marathon for sponsorship reasons, is an annual half marathon foot-race held in New Delhi, India. Established in 2005, it is both an elite runner and mass participation event. It is an AIMS-certified course and is listed as a Gold Label Road Race by the IAAF. The race has seen the best of the athletes competing since the course is considered one of the fastest half marathon route. The event sees about 40,000 participants through the race categories of half marathon, the 7 km Great Delhi Run, a 4.3 km run for senior citizens, and a 3.5 km wheelchair race

== Course ==
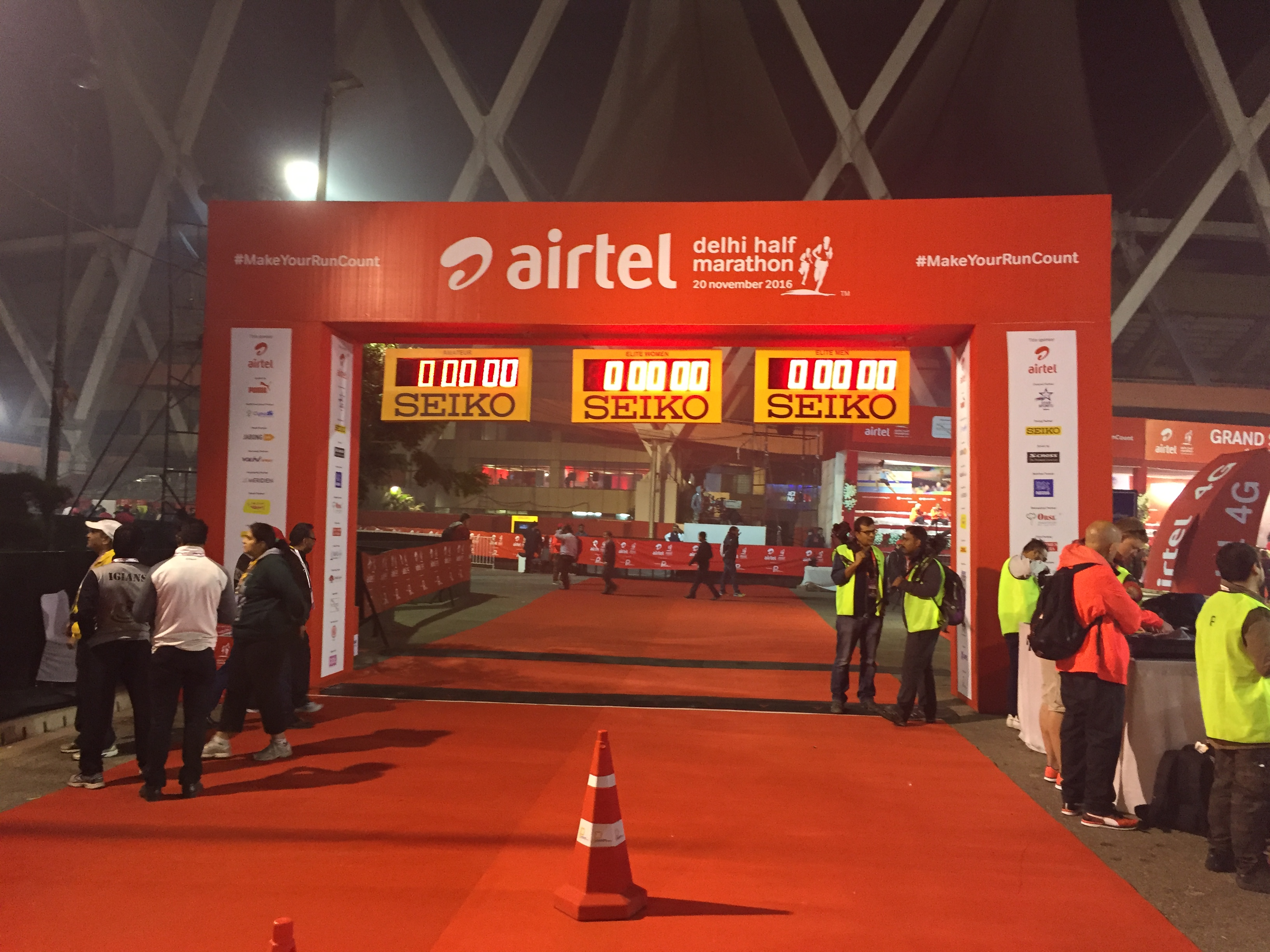
Finish line of Airtel Delhi Half Marathon 2016 at Nehru Stadium

The course starts in the Nehru Stadium, although this was temporarily moved to the grounds of the Secretariat Building while the stadium was under renovation for the 2010 Commonwealth Games. The race is largely flat and has delivered fast winning times in its short history, with men producing a number of sub-one hour times and women recording times under 1:08:00.

== Sponsor ==
The current title sponsor is Vedanta who signed up in 2022 for 5 years till 2027. The race was sponsored Hutchison Essar for its first two races, and the company sponsored the event as Vodafone Essar in 2007 following a takeover. Rival communications company Airtel held the sponsor role since 2008 to 2020.

== Prize ==
The half marathon is the elite runner race, while the Great Delhi Run attracts the majority of participants overall. The inaugural edition in 2005 had total prize money of US$310,000. The prize for the winners of the men's and women's race was $25,000 in 2009 and $27,000 in 2015.

== Past winners ==
Key: Course record

| Edition | Year | Men's winner | Time (h:m:s) | Women's winner | Time (h:m:s) |
|---|---|---|---|---|---|
| 1st | 2005 | Philip Rugut (KEN) | 1:01:55 | Irina Timofeyeva (RUS) | 1:10:35 |
| 2nd | 2006 | Francis Kibiwott (KEN) | 1:01:36 | Lineth Chepkurui (KEN) | 1:10:40 |
| 3rd | 2007 | Dieudonné Disi (RWA) | 1:00:43 | Deriba Alemu (ETH) | 1:10:30 |
| 4th | 2008 | Deriba Merga (ETH) | 59:15 | Aselefech Mergia (ETH) | 1:08:17 |
| 5th | 2009 | Deriba Merga (ETH) | 59:54 | Mary Keitany (KEN) | 1:06:54 |
| 6th | 2010 | Geoffrey Mutai (KEN) | 59:38 | Aselefech Mergia (ETH) | 1:08:35 |
| 7th | 2011 | Lelisa Desisa (ETH) | 59:30 | Lucy Wangui (KEN) | 1:07:04 |
| 8th | 2012 | Edwin Kipyego (KEN) | 1:00:55 | Wude Ayalew (ETH) | 1:11:10 |
| 9th | 2013 | Atsedu Tsegay (ETH) | 59:12 | Florence Kiplagat (KEN) | 1:08:02 |
| 10th | 2014 | Guye Adola (ETH) | 59:06 | Florence Kiplagat (KEN) | 1:10:04 |
| 11th | 2015 | Birhanu Legese (ETH) | 59:20 | Cynthia Limo (KEN) | 1:08:35 |
| 12th | 2016 | Eliud Kipchoge (KEN) | 59:44 | Worknesh Degefa (ETH) | 1:07:42 |
| 13th | 2017 | Birhanu Legese (ETH) | 59:46 | Almaz Ayana (ETH) | 1:07:12 |
| 14th | 2018 | Andamlak Belihu (ETH) | 59:18 | Tsehay Gemechu (ETH) | 1:06:49 |
| 15th | 2019 | Andamlak Belihu (ETH) | 59:10 | Tsehay Gemechu (ETH) | 1:06:00 |
| 16th | 2020 | Amedework Walelegn (ETH) | 58:53 | Yalemzerf Yehualaw (ETH) | 1:04:46 |
Virtual race due to COVID-19
| 17th | 2022 | Chala Regasa (ETH) | 1:00:30 | Irine Cheptai (ETH) | 1:06:42 |
| 18th | 2023 | Daniel Ebenyo (KEN) | 59:27 | Alamz Ayana (ETH) | 1:07:58 |
| 19th | 2024 | Joshua Cheptegei (UGA) | 59:46 | Alemaddis Eyayu (ETH) | 1:08:17 |
| 20th | 2025 | Alex Matata (KEN) | 59:50 | Lilian Rengeruk (KEN) | 1:07:20 |
| 21st | 2026 | Charles Matata (KEN) | 58:52 | Wudinesh Alemu (ETH) | 1:06:35 |

== Sponsors/partners ==
- Title sponsor: Vedanta
- Channel partner: Star Sports
- Driven by: Tata Nexon
- Ignited by: Puma
- Energy Drink partner: Fast&Up
- Snacking partner: Cadbury Fuse
- Hospitality partner: Le Meridein
- Medical partner: Metro Hospitals
- Print partner: The Times of India
- Cooldown Companion: Bira 91
- Official Photographer: Glint
- Entrainment partner: Radio Mirchi
- Philanthropy partner: United Way, Delhi NCR
- Institution partner: Harmony for Silvers Foundation
- Supported by: Government of Delhi
- Supported by: Sports Authority of India
- Supported by: Delhi Metro
- Supported by: New Delhi Municipal Corporation
- Supported by: IPRS
- Under the aegis of: Athletics Federation of India
- Certified by: AIMS
- Inclusion Ally: Adventures beyond
- Promoted by : Procam
