= Mauritania at the 2019 African Games =

- Flag of Mauritania
- IOC code: MTN
- NOC: Comité National Olympique et Sportif Mauritanien

in Rabat, Morocco 19 August 2019 – 31 August 2019
- Competitors: 10 (10 men and 0 women) in 8 sports
- Medals: Gold 0 Silver 0 Bronze 0 Total 0

African Games appearances
- 2011; 2015; 2019; 2023

Mauritania competed at the 2019 African Games held from 19 to 31 August 2019 in Rabat, Morocco.

== Athletics ==
Abidine Abidine was the only athlete to represent Mauritania in athletics. He competed in the men's 5000 metres event and he finished in 27th place.

== Chess ==
Sidi Mohamed Cheikh Hassan and Yahi Mohamed Salem both competed in the men's blitz individual and the men's rapid individual events.

== Judo ==
One athlete represented Mauritania in judo.

Athlete	Event	Round of 32	Round of 16	Quarterfinals	Semifinals	Repechage 1	Final / BM	
Athlete	Event	Opposition Result	Opposition Result	Opposition Result	Opposition Result	Opposition Result	Opposition Result	Rank
Cheikhna Diakhite	Men's 73 kg	Ganzo (KEN); W	Diallo-Le Blanc (BUR); L	did not advance				

== Karate ==
Vadel Haidara competed in karate. He was eliminated in the first round.

== Shooting ==
Levdhil Levdhil competed in the men's trap event. He did not win a medal.

== Table tennis ==
Moctar Ahmed Salem El competed in table tennis in the men's singles event. He was eliminated in his first match against Maret Camara (representing Guinea).

== Tennis ==
Said Mohamed El Hafedh competed in tennis in the men's singles event. He lost his match against Johnson Acquah (representing Ghana) and did not advance to the next match.

== Wrestling ==
Abou Diallo (Men's Greco-Roman 60 kg) and Bocar Mbodj (Men's Freestyle 74 kg) were scheduled to compete in wrestling but neither competed in their event.
