= Helen Jepkurgat =

Kenyan athlete

Personal information
- Born: 21 February 1989 (age 36)

Sport
- Country: Kenya
- Sport: Athletics
- Event: Long-distance running

Helen Jepkurgat (also known as Hellen Jepkurgat; born 21 February 1989) is a Kenyan-born athlete competing in middle- and long-distance running who has won major races in Africa, the United States, France and Italy. In the 2019 African Games (held in Rabat, Morocco), Jepkurgat was one of three women chosen to compete for Kenya in the African Half Marathon Championship. She was the top Kenyan competitor in a race that saw Ethiopians sweep the podium. She finished in fourth place with a time of 1:12:29, a few seconds behind Tola Mesetey Belete.

== Professional career ==
Jepkurgat has won many races throughout France, including the 2009 Tour de Tirol, the 2012 Mémorial Partigiani Stellina, and the 2016 Marathon Vert de Rennes.

Her second-place finish at the 2011 Nairobi Half Marathon established her as a major international half marathoner. In Italy, she won half marathons in Turin in 2012, she was second in Milan to Pauline Kahenya in 2013, she won in Jesolo (in 2014), and Piacenza (in 2015, clocking 1:09:56, one of the fastest women's half marathon times of that year). Until 2023, she held the course record for the Venice-based Moonlight Half Marathon.

In the 2016 Geneva Marathon, Jepkurgat made her marathon debut and raced with Jane Kiptoo through the Swiss streets. They ran through the warm weather close together, but Jeptoo pulled away and won by 12 seconds.

In 2017, she won the largest marathon in California: the Los Angeles Marathon. At the race, she led more than 10,000 other women, including Kenyan Jane Kibii and Ethiopian Biruktayit Degefa, punching through the miles in the mild 60-degree air to break the tape and finish in 2:34:24.

The year proved to be a big one for her. She traveled to Duluth, Minnesota, for the Grandma's Marathon (named after the restaurant on the canal). Starting in Two Harbors, Minnesota, she raced with the top runners along the North Shore of Lake Superior to capture the first-place prize. A few months later, she was the second-place finisher at the Minneapolis-to-St. Paul Twin Cities Marathon. The three races earned her $40,000 in prize winnings.

In 2019, she chased Ethiopian Lemelem Berha to finish second in 2:31:33 at the World Athletics Bronze-labeled BP Castellón Marathon in Spain. She ran the Lisbon Marathon as well, again on the heels of the leader (which was Ethiopian Sechale Delasa), finishing second by just six seconds. Her final time was sub-2:30 (2:29:57), two minutes ahead of third-place Sule Utura.

In 2020, she dueled with Ugandan Immaculate Chemutai in Thailand at the Buriram Marathon and finished third in 2:33:25.

Jepkurgat placed top-10 in the September 2021 Madrid Marathon in Spain. Prior to that (in April), she won 5th place at the Lagos Marathon in Nigeria.

In April 2022, she competed at the Izmir Marathon in Turkey, finishing in third behind Lilian Chemweno and Letebrhan Haylay.

The following spring, she won the Abalone Marathon de Nantes in France by four minutes (in 2:40:34), returned to Kenya, and won a local marathon sponsored by Lukenya University.

== Personal life ==
Jepkurgat has worked with agent Marc Corstjens, the former Belgian national record-holder in the 1,500 meters and 800 meters. In 2017, she was living and training in Grand Prairie, Texas.
