= Timothy Toroitich =

Ugandan runner (born 1991)

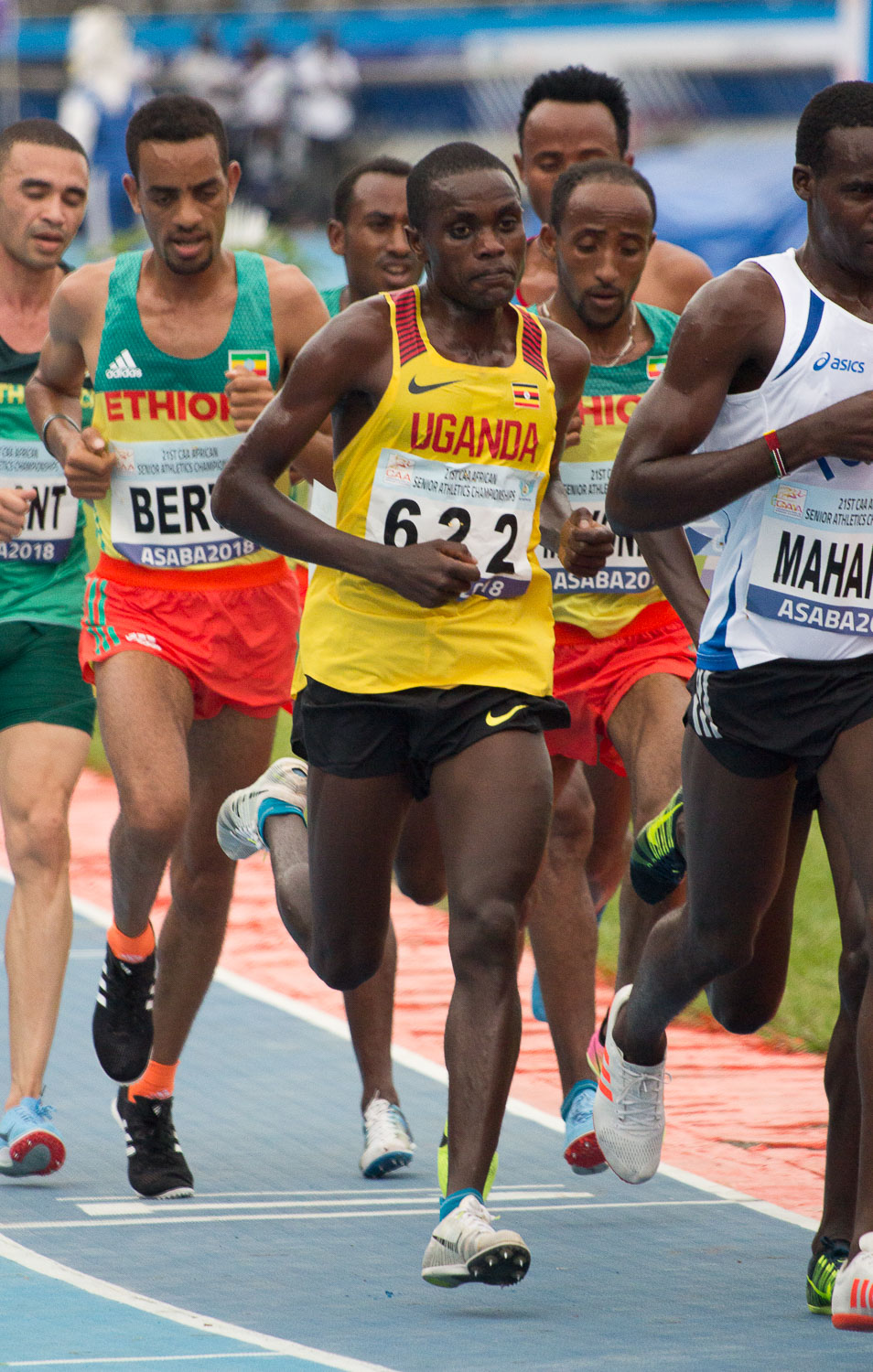
- Timothy Toroitich at the 2018 African Championships

Personal information
- Born: 10 October 1991 (age 34)

Sport
- Country: Uganda
- Sport: Track and field
- Event(s): 5000 metres, 10,000 metres
Medal record
Men's athletics
Representing Uganda
African Championships
Bronze medal – third place	2018 Asaba	10,000 m

Timothy Toroitich (born 10 October 1991) is a Ugandan middle-distance and long-distance runner. He competed in the 10,000 metres event at the 2015 World Championships in Athletics in Beijing, China.

== Personal bests ==
- 1500 metres: 3:46.95, Kampala, Uganda 2 June 2012
- 5000 metres: 13:32.21, Rabat, Morocco, 9 June 2013
- 10,000 metres: 27:21.09, London, Great Britain, 4 August 2017
- 3000 metres steeplechase: 8:23.61, Brazzaville, Congo, 10 June 2012
- 10 kilometres: 28:42, Birmingham, Great Britain, 30 April 2017
- 12 kilometres: 33:48, Cape Town, South Africa, 17 May 2015
- Half marathon: 1:00:53, Lisbon, Portugal, 20 October 2019
