= Marthe Yankurije =

Rwandan long-distance runner

Personal information
- Born: 5 July 1994 (age 32)
- Home town: Nyamasheke District, Rwanda
- Years active: 2014–present
- Height: 161 cm (5 ft 3 in)
- Weight: 45 kg (99 lb)

Sport
- Country: Rwanda
- Sport: Running
- Events: 5,000 metres; Half marathon

Achievements and titles
- Olympic finals: 2020
- Regional finals: 2019
- National finals: 2018
Medal record
Long-distance running
Rwandan National Championships
Gold medal – first place	2018	10,000 metres
Gold medal – first place	2018	Cross-country

Marthe Yankurije (born 5 July 1994) is a Rwandan long-distance runner. In 2018, she won her country's 10,000 metres and Cross-Country Championships. She also won the half marathon race at the 2021 Kigali International Peace Marathon, and competed in the 5,000 metres event at the delayed 2020 Summer Olympics.

== Career ==
Yankurije competes for the APR Athletics Club; prior to 2016, she competed at Nyamasheke Athletics Club. She started athletics at the age of 11. She debuted at the 2014 Kigali half marathon, finishing fifth, and later in the year, she competed at the 2014 African Cross Country Championships, finishing 35th. She came fourth in the half marathon event at the 2017 Kigali International Peace Marathon and won the 20 kilometres (12 mi) event in Bugesera. Yankurije won the 10,000 metres event at the 2018 Rwandan National Championships. In the same year, she won the Rwandan national Cross-Country Championships, and came third in the half marathon event at the 2018 Kigali International Peace Marathon, and the Dar Marathon in Tanzania.

In 2019, she came second in that year's Kigali International Peace Marathon half marathon race, and won the 20 kilometres (12 mi) event in Bugesera again. In the same year, she competed in the 10,000 metres event at the 2019 African Games; she was one of only two Rwandan athletes at the Games. In 2020, she won the Huye Half Marathon in a time of 1:15:15. She also finished third in a virtual Trier 5 kilometres (3.1 mi) race.

In May 2021, she competed in the Zambian Track and Field Championships in Lusaka, a qualification event for the 2020 Summer Olympics. In June, she won the Kigali International Peace Marathon half marathon race. As a result, she was given the Rwandan wildcard place to compete at the 2020 Summer Olympics. She competed in the 5,000 metres event; she finished 17th in her heat, and did not progress.

== Personal life ==
Yankurije was born in July 1994. She is from Nyamasheke District, Rwanda. At school, she played association football and handball. She left school early, during her fourth year of secondary school in 2012.
