= Abigail Kwarteng =

Ghanaian high jumper (born 1997)

Abigail Kwarteng (born January 13, 1997, in Bekwai) is a Ghanaian high jumper. She has competed at world championships, most recently at the 2019 African Games in Rabat, Morocco.

== Education ==
She was a student of Alabama University. and currently attends Middle Tennessee State University.

== Career ==
In February 2016 she performed impressively at the National Open Athletics Championship which qualified her for the 2016 Africa Athletics Championships. Kwarteng made her first international experience in 2016 at the African Championships in Athletics in Durban, where she finished fourth with 1.76 m, as well as two years later at the African Championships in Asaba with 1.80 m. In 2019 she took part for the first time in the African Games in Rabat and made a jump of 1.75 m which earned her the eight position.

== Personal best ==
=== Outdoor ===
- High jump: 1.87 m, 5 May 2018 in Lubbock

=== Indoor ===
- High jump (hall): 1.82 m, February 23, 2019, in Fayetteville
