= Titus Ekiru =

Kenyan long-distance runner

Personal information
- Born: 2 January 1992 (age 34)

Sport
- Country: Kenya
- Sport: Long-distance running
Medal record
Men's long-distance running
Representing Kenya
African Games
Gold medal – first place	2019 Rabat	Half marathon

Titus Ekiru (born 2 January 1992) is a Kenyan long-distance runner. He represented Kenya at the 2019 African Games and he won the men's half marathon with a time of 1:01:42. He became the first Kenyan to win this event at the African Games. This was also a new African Games record.

In 2023, Ekiru was banned from competition for ten years backdated to 2021 for breaching both doping and tampering rules following testing at the Milan and Abu Dhabi marathons held in 2021. The investigation also indicated collusion with a doctor at a Kenyan hospital.

== Career ==
In 2017, he won the Seville Marathon in Seville, Spain with a time of 2:07:42.

In 2018, he won the Honolulu Marathon with a time of 2:09:01 and the half marathon event of the Rock 'n' Roll San Diego Marathon with a time of 1:01:02. He also won the Mexico City Marathon event with a new course record of 2:10:38.

In 2019, he won the Milano City Marathon and he set a new course record of 2:04:46. In that year, he also won the Portugal Half Marathon and he set a new course record of 1:00:12. In December 2019, he won the Honolulu Marathon for the 2nd time with a new course record of 2:07:59.

During 2021 Ekiru participated in both the Milano City Marathon and the Abu Dhabi Marathon and at the time was recorded at the winner in the races. However, in 2023 he was disqualified from both races following a doping and tampering ban linked to those marathons.

== Doping ban ==
In 2023, the AIU suspended Ekiru for two counts for the use of prohibited substances (triamcinolone acetonide and pethidine) and two counts of tampering for submitting falsified medical records and documentation for the two positive tests. He is banned for 10 years and all results from 16 May 2021 were disqualified.

== Achievements ==
Year	Competition	Venue	Position	Event	Notes
Representing Kenya
2016	Casablanca Marathon	Casablanca, Morocco	2nd	Marathon	2:15:43
2017	Seville Marathon	Seville, Spain	1st	Marathon	2:07:42
2017	Honolulu Marathon	Honolulu, Hawaii	4th	Marathon	2:12:19
2018	Rock 'n' Roll San Diego Marathon	San Diego, United States	1st	Half marathon	1:01:02
2018	Mexico City Marathon	Mexico City, Mexico	1st	Marathon	2:10:38
2018	Honolulu Marathon	Honolulu, Hawaii	1st	Marathon	2:09:01
2019	Milano City Marathon	Milano, Italy	1st	Marathon	2:04:46
2019	African Games	Rabat, Morocco	1st	Half marathon	1:01:42
2019	Portugal Half Marathon	Lisbon, Portugal	1st	Half marathon	1:00:12
2019	Honolulu Marathon	Honolulu, Hawaii	1st	Marathon	2:07:59
2021	Milano City Marathon	Milano, Italy	DQ	Marathon	DQ (2:02:57)
2021	Abu Dhabi Marathon	Abu Dhabi, UAE	DQ	Marathon	DQ (2:06:13)
