= Kokob Tesfagabriel =

Eritrean long-distance runner

Personal information
- Born: 4 June 1994 (age 31)
- Height: 165 cm (5 ft 5 in)
- Weight: 52 kg (115 lb)

Sport
- Country: Eritrea
- Sport: Long-distance running

Kokob Tesfagabriel Solomon (born 4 June 1994) is an Eritrean long-distance runner. In 2018, she competed in the women's half marathon at the 2018 IAAF World Half Marathon Championships held in Valencia, Spain. She finished in 38th place.

== Career ==
In 2015, she competed in the women's half marathon at the 2015 African Games held in Brazzaville, Republic of Congo. She finished in 4th place.

In 2017, she competed in the senior women's race at the 2017 IAAF World Cross Country Championships held in Kampala, Uganda. She finished in 73rd place.

In 2019, she represented Eritrea at the 2019 African Games held in Rabat, Morocco. She competed in the women's half marathon and she finished in 12th place with a time of 1:15:33.

In 2021, she competed in the women's marathon at the 2020 Summer Olympics.
