= 2025 Tokyo Marathon =

42.195 km (26.2 mi) race in Japan

18th Tokyo Marathon
- Location: Tokyo, Japan
- Date: 2 March 2025 (17 months ago)
- Website: www.marathon.tokyo/en/

Champions
- Men: Tadese Takele (2:03:23)
- Women: Sutume Kebede (2:16:31)
- Wheelchair men: Tomoki Suzuki (1:19:14)
- Wheelchair women: Catherine Debrunner (1:35:56)

The 2025 Tokyo Marathon was the 18th edition of the annual marathon race in Tokyo, held on Sunday, 2 March 2025. A Platinum Label marathon, it was the first of seven World Marathon Majors events to be held in 2025.

Ethiopians Tadese Takele and Sutume Kebede won the men's and women's races, respectively, with Kebede successfully defending her 2024 title. Tomoki Suzuki of Japan also defended his 2024 title by winning the men's wheelchair race, while the women's wheelchair race was won by Catherine Debrunner of Switzerland.

== Results ==
=== Men ===
Elite men's top 10 finishers
Position	Athlete	Nationality	Time
1st place, gold medalist(s)	Tadese Takele	Ethiopia	2:03:23
2nd place, silver medalist(s)	Deresa Geleta	Ethiopia	2:03:51
3rd place, bronze medalist(s)	Vincent Kipkemoi	Kenya	2:04:00
4	Titus Kipruto	Kenya	2:05:34
5	Mulugeta Asefa Uma	Ethiopia	2:05:46
6	Geoffrey Toroitich	Kenya	2:05:46
7	Benson Kipruto	Kenya	2:05:46
8	Suldan Hassan	Sweden	2:05:57
9	Joshua Cheptegei	Uganda	2:05:59
10	Tsubasa Ichiyama	Japan	2:06:00

English musician Harry Styles finished in 6010th place with a time of 3:24:07.

=== Women ===
Elite women's top 10 finishers
Position	Athlete	Nationality	Time
1st place, gold medalist(s)	Sutume Asefa Kebede	Ethiopia	2:16:31
2nd place, silver medalist(s)	Winfridah Moraa Moseti	Kenya	2:16:56
3rd place, bronze medalist(s)	Hawi Feysa	Ethiopia	2:17:00
4	Magdalyne Masai	Kenya	2:19:28
5	Rosemary Wanjiru	Kenya	2:19:57
6	Desi Jisa Mokonin	Bahrain	2:20:07
7	Gotytom Gebreslase	Ethiopia	2:20:25
8	Degitu Azimeraw	Ethiopia	2:20:26
9	Zhang Deshun	China	2:20:53
10	Jessica Stenson	Australia	2:22:56
