= Winfridah Moraa Moseti =

Kenyan long-distance runner

Personal information
- Nationality: Kenyan
- Born: Winfridah Moraa Moseti; 10 February 1996 (age 30) Kenya
- Occupation: Long-distance runner
- Years active: 2022–present

Sport
- Country: Kenya
- Sport: Athletics
- Events: Marathon, Half marathon, 10K road, 10,000m

Achievements and titles
- Personal bests: Marathon: 2:16:56 (2025); Half marathon: 1:05:59 (2024); 10K road: 31:32 (2022); 10,000m: 32:22.3h (2022)
Medal record
World Marathon Majors
Silver medal – second place	2025 Tokyo	Marathon

Winfridah Moraa Moseti (born 10 February 1996) is a Kenyan long-distance runner who competes in the marathon and half marathon. Since emerging on the international scene in 2022, she has established herself among the world's top performers, highlighted by a podium finish at a World Marathon Major.

== Career ==
Moseti's professional career began gaining momentum in 2022, following her move to Iten in 2021, a high-altitude training center in Kenya renowned for producing world-class distance runners. The transition proved pivotal in developing her endurance and racecraft. That year, she recorded a personal best of 31:32 in the 10-kilometre road race and 32:22.3h in the 10,000 metres.

In 2024, Moseti achieved a personal best of 1:05:59 with a runner-up finish at the Málaga Half Marathon, and later claimed victory at the Bangsaen21 Half Marathon in Thailand with a time of 1:10:01.

After achieving strong finishes at several major international races, including ninth at the Milan Marathon, fourth at the Rome Marathon, fifth at the Paris Marathon, second at the Frankfurt Marathon, and third at both the Hamburg Marathon and the TCS Amsterdam Marathon, she delivered a breakthrough performance at the 2025 Tokyo Marathon. There, she secured a second-place finish in 2:16:56, a personal best, at one of the prestigious World Marathon Majors.

This achievement ranked her as the sixth-fastest Kenyan woman in history over the marathon distance. Moseti continues to train with the goal of representing Kenya at future World Athletics Championships and other global competitions.

== Personal life ==
Moseti's career is supported by her husband.

== Personal bests ==
- Marathon: 2:16:56 (Tokyo, 2 March 2025)
- Half marathon: 1:05:59 (Málaga, 10 March 2024)
- 10 Kilometres Road: 31:32 (Iten, 10 June 2022)
- 10,000 Metres: 32:22.3h (29 March 2022)

== Achievements ==
Year	Race	City	Position	Time
2022	Milan Marathon	Milan	9th	2:28:47
2022	TCS Amsterdam Marathon	Amsterdam	3rd	2:23:44
2023	Rome Marathon	Rome	4th	2:24:28
2023	Paris Marathon	Paris	5th	2:21:49
2023	Hamburg Marathon	Hamburg	3rd	2:21:24
2023	Frankfurt Marathon	Frankfurt	2nd	2:21:10
2024	Malaga Half Marathon	Málaga	2nd	1:05:59 (PB)
2024	Bangsaen21 Half Marathon	Chonburi, Thailand	1st	1:10:01
2025	Tokyo Marathon	Tokyo	2nd	2:16:56 (PB)
