= 2018 African Championships in Athletics – Men's 10,000 metres =

The men's 10,000 metres event at the 2018 African Championships in Athletics was held on 1 August in Asaba, Nigeria.

== Results ==
Rank	Athlete	Nationality	Time	Notes
1st place, gold medalist(s)	Jemal Yimer	Ethiopia	29:08.01	
2nd place, silver medalist(s)	Andamlak Belihu	Ethiopia	29:11.09	
3rd place, bronze medalist(s)	Timothy Toroitich	Uganda	29:11.87	
4	Vincent Kipsang Rono	Kenya	29:14.52	
5	Isaac Kipsang	Kenya	29:25.54	
6	Awet Habte	Eritrea	29:38.41	
7	Josphat Kipkoech Bett	Kenya	30:13.22	
8	Ibrahim Ismael Hassan	Djibouti	30:13.36	
9	Elroy Gelant	South Africa	30:23.35	
10	Ali Mahamat	Chad	31:12.18	
	Taye Girma	Ethiopia	DNF	
	Gabriel Geay	Tanzania	DNS	
	Agustino Sulle	Tanzania	DNS	
	Mahamadal Fadal Adamou Abdou	Niger	DNS	
	Ibrahim Jemal Husen	Chad	DNS	
	David Kulang	South Sudan	DNS	
	Toka Badboy	Lesotho	DNS	
	Mehari Tsefai	Eritrea	DNS	
