= Zeineba Yimer =

Ethiopian long-distance runner

Personal information
- Nationality: Ethiopian
- Born: 17 June 1998 (age 28)

Sport
- Country: Ethiopia
- Sport: Athletics
- Event: Long-distance running
- Team: NN Running Team
Medal record
Women's athletics
Representing Ethiopia
African Games
| Silver medal – second place | 2019 Rabat | 10,000 m |
World Half Marathon Championships
| Gold medal – first place | 2018 Valencia | Team |

Zeineba Yimer (born 17 June 1998) is an Ethiopian long-distance runner. She represented Ethiopia at the 2019 African Games in Rabat, Morocco and won the silver medal in the women's 10,000 metres event.

== Career ==
In 2017, Zeineba Yimer won the Great Ethiopian Run held in Addis Ababa, Ethiopia.

She finished in fifth place at the 2018 IAAF World Half Marathon Championships in Valencia, Spain. In the team event Yimer, Netsanet Gudeta and Meseret Belete won the gold medal with a combined time of 3:22:27. In 2020, she competed in the women's half marathon at the 2020 World Athletics Half Marathon Championships held in Gdynia, Poland.

Yimer competed in the women's marathon at the delayed 2020 Tokyo Olympics.

== Achievements ==
Representing Ethiopia
| Year | Competition | Venue | Position | Event | Notes |
|---|---|---|---|---|---|
| 2017 | Great Ethiopian Run | Addis Ababa, Ethiopia | 1st | 10,000 m | 32:30 |
| 2018 | World Half Marathon Championships | Valencia, Spain | 5th | Half marathon | 1:08:07 |
| 2018 | World Half Marathon Championships | Valencia, Spain | 1st | Half marathon | 3:22:27 |
| 2019 | African Games | Rabat, Morocco | 2nd | 10,000 m | 31:57.95 |
| 2020 | World Half Marathon Championships | Gdynia, Poland | 4th | Half marathon | 1:05:39 |
| 2021 | Olympic Games | Sapporo, Japan | – | Marathon | DNF |
