= Athletics at the 2019 African Games – Women's half marathon =

The women's half marathon event at the 2019 African Games was held on 30 August in Rabat.

== Results ==
Rank	Name	Nationality	Time	Notes
1st place, gold medalist(s)	Yalemzerf Yehualaw	Ethiopia	1:10:26	GR
2nd place, silver medalist(s)	Degitu Azimeraw	Ethiopia	1:10:31	
3rd place, bronze medalist(s)	Meseret Belete	Ethiopia	1:12:08	
4	Hellen Jepkurgat	Kenya	1:12:29	
5	Grace Mbuthye Kimanzi	Kenya	1:13:16	
6	Fortunate Chidzivo	Zimbabwe	1:13:47	
7	Natalia Elisante Sulle	Tanzania	1:14:33	
8	Lavinia Haitope	Namibia	1:14:53	
9	Linet Toroitich Chebet	Uganda	1:15:15	
10	Dolshi Tesfu	Eritrea	1:15:25	
11	Simret Merhawi	Eritrea	1:15:26	
12	Kokob Tesfagabriel	Eritrea	1:15:33	
13	Beata Naigambo	Namibia	1:24:28	
14	Koutou Madjou	Chad	1:38:03	
	Caroline Korir	Kenya	DNF	
	Sara Ramadhani	Tanzania	DNF	
