= Hawi Feysa =

Ethiopian long-distance runner

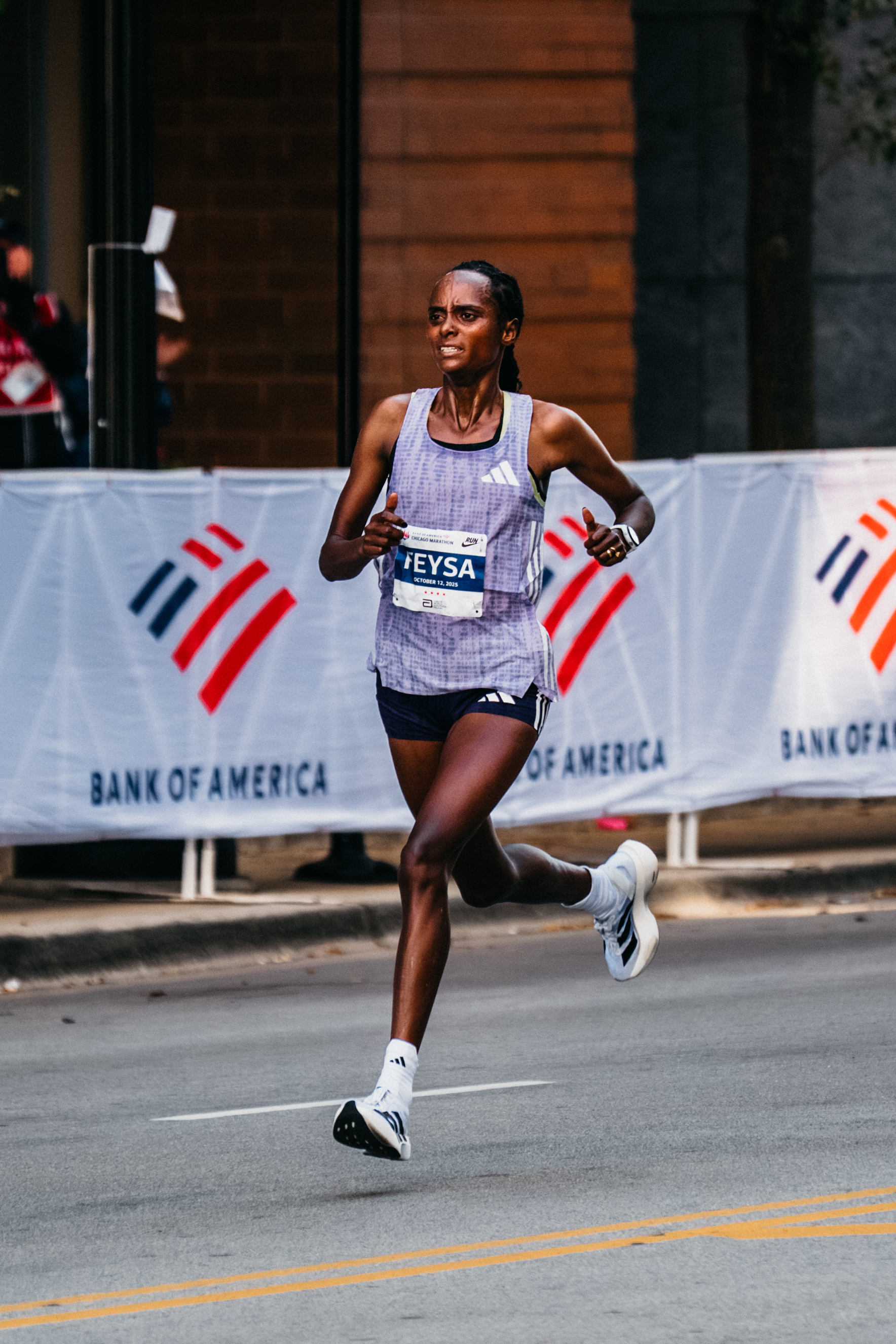
- Haw Feysa Gejia at mile 25 of the 2025 Chicago Marathon

Personal information
- Nationality: Ethiopian
- Born: Hawi Feysa; 1 February 1999 (age 27) Ambo, Oromia Region, Ethiopia
- Occupation: long-distance runner
- Years active: 2017–present
- Spouse: (married in Addis Ababa)

Sport
- Country: Ethiopia
- Sport: Athletics
- Events: Marathon, Half marathon, 5000 metres, Cross Country
- Coached by: Gemedu Dedefo

Achievements and titles
- World finals: 2019 World Athletics Championships (5000m)
- Personal bests: Marathon: 2:13:33 (2026); Half marathon: 1:05:41 (2021); 5000 metres: 14:33.66 (2022); 2000 metres: 5:38.66 (2019)
Medal record
Athletics
Representing Ethiopia
World Marathon Majors
Gold medal – first place	2025 Chicago Marathon	Marathon
Gold medal – first place	2026 Chicago Marathon	Marathon
Bronze medal – third place	2025 Tokyo Marathon	Marathon
Bronze medal – third place	2026 Tokyo Marathon	Marathon
African Games
Silver medal – second place	2019 Rabat	5000 m
World Cross Country Championships
Silver medal – second place	2017 Kampala	Junior race

Hawi Feysa (born 1 February 1999) is an Ethiopian long-distance runner specializing in marathon and road races, as well as track and cross country events. She is best known for her breakthrough marathon performances, including her course record-breaking victory at the 2024 Frankfurt Marathon and a strong third-place finish at the 2025 Tokyo Marathon.

== Career ==
Hawi Feysa hails from Ambo, a city in the Oromia region of Ethiopia, where she grew up on a farm with five sisters and two brothers. Inspired by idols like Tirunesh Dibaba, she began running at a young age, training on a local loop course. At 16, she moved to Addis Ababa, the capital of Ethiopia, to join a club.

Early in her career, Feysa competed in track and cross country. She earned a silver medal in the junior women's race at the 2017 IAAF World Cross Country Championships. In 2019, she won a silver medal in the 5000 metres at the 2019 African Games in Rabat, Morocco. She also competed in the 5000 metres at the 2019 World Athletics Championships, finishing eighth. Her personal best in the 5000m is 14:33.66, set in 2022. She transitioned to road running due to frequent injuries on the track.

Feysa achieved a major breakthrough in the marathon in 2024. At the 2024 Frankfurt Marathon, she won the race in a new course record time of 2:17:25, improving the previous record by 1:45. This performance placed her 19th on the all-time list and was the 12th fastest time worldwide that year. Her training group in Addis Ababa, coached by Gemedu Dedefo, includes other elite marathoners such as Tigst Assefa and Tigist Ketema.

In 2025, Feysa continued her strong marathon form, finishing third at the 2025 Tokyo Marathon with a time of 2:17:00, setting a new personal best. Her next goal is to run a sub-2:15 marathon.

== Personal life ==
Feysa is married and lives in Addis Ababa. She supports her family financially and has two younger sisters who also train with her in Addis Ababa, aiming to reach her level in running.

== Achievements ==
Year	Race	Place	Position	Time
2017	IAAF World Cross Country Championships	Kampala	2nd	Junior Race (silver medal)
2019	African Games	Rabat	2nd	5000m (silver medal)
2019	World Athletics Championships	Doha	8th	5000m (14:44.92)
2023	World Cross Country Championships	Bathurst	6th	Senior team
2024	Frankfurt Marathon	Frankfurt	1st	2:17:25 (Course Record)
2025	Tokyo Marathon	Tokyo	3rd	2:17:00
2025	Chicago Marathon	Chicago	1st	2:14:57
