= Athletics at the 2019 African Games – Women's high jump =

The women's high jump event at the 2019 African Games was held on 27 August in Rabat.

== Results ==
Rank	Name	Nationality	1.55	1.60	1.65	1.70	1.75	1.78	1.81	1.84	1.87	Result	Notes
1st place, gold medalist(s)	Rose Amoanimaa Yeboah	Ghana	–	–	o	o	xo	xxo	o	o	xxx	1.84	
2nd place, silver medalist(s)	Rhizlane Siba	Morocco	–	–	o	o	o	o	o	xxx		1.81	
3rd place, bronze medalist(s)	Ariyat Dibow	Ethiopia	–	–	o	o	o	xo	o	xxx		1.81	NR
4	Esther Isah	Nigeria	–	–	o	o	o	xo	xxx			1.78	
5	Doreen Amata	Nigeria	–	–	–	o	xo	xo	xxx			1.78	
5	Fatima Zahra El Alaoui	Morocco	–	–	–	o	xo	xo	xxx			1.78	
7	Julia du Plessis	South Africa	–	–	o	xxo	o	xxx				1.75	
8	Abigail Kwarteng	Ghana	–	–	–	o	xxo	xxx				1.75	
9	Natasha Chetty	Seychelles	–	o	o	o	xxx					1.70	
9	Basant Hassan	Egypt	–	–	o	o	xxx					1.70	
11	Odile Ahouanwanou	Benin	–	o	–	xo	xxx					1.70	
11	Fatimata Zoungrana	Burkina Faso	o	o	o	xo	xxx					1.70	
13	Hoda Hagras	Egypt	–	–	xo	xo	xxx					1.70	
	Ajuda Oumde	Ethiopia										DNS	
	Kiru Oman	Ethiopia										DNS	
