= Jemal Yimer Mekonnen =

Ethiopian long-distance runner

Jemal Yimer
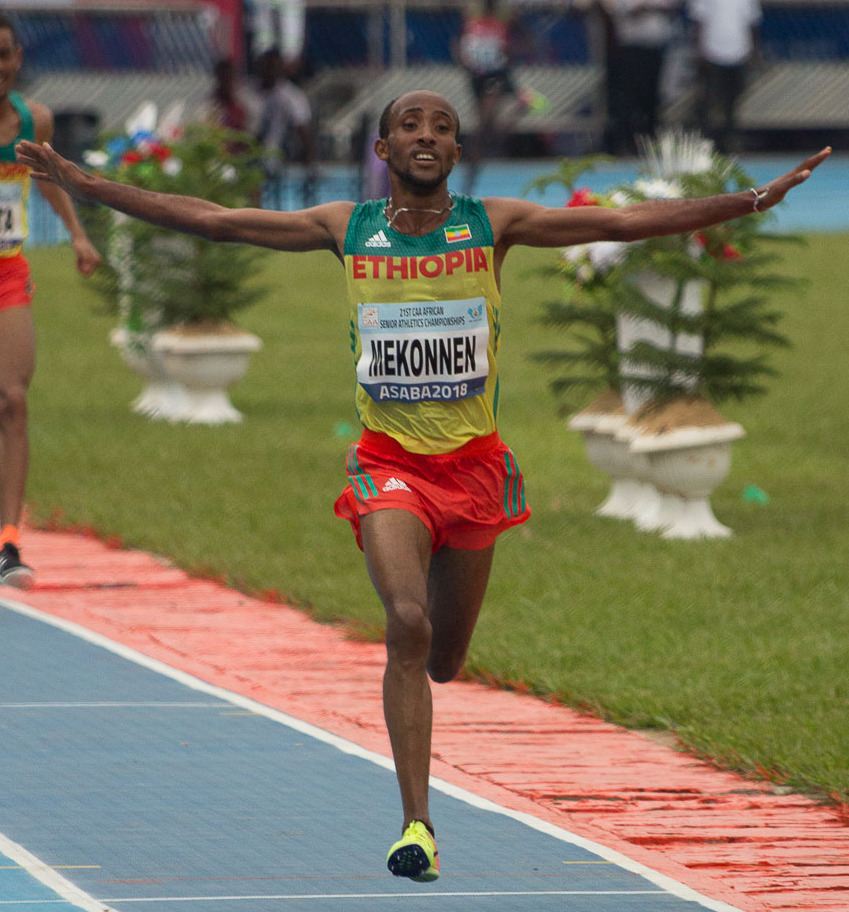
- Yimer at the 2018 African Championships

Personal information
- Full name: Jemal Yimer Mekonnen
- Nationality: Ethiopian
- Born: 11 September 1996 (age 30)

Sport
- Sport: Athletics
- Event: Long-distance running
Medal record
Men's athletics
Representing Ethiopia
All-Africa Games
Bronze medal – third place	2019 Rabat	10,000 m
African Championships
Gold medal – first place	2018 Asaba	10,000 m
World Marathon Majors
Bronze medal – third place	2021 Boston	Marathon

Jemal Yimer Mekonnen (born 11 September 1996) is an Ethiopian long-distance runner.

He placed fourth at the 2017 IAAF World Cross Country Championships, and finished fifth at the 2017 World Championships in Athletics – Men's 10,000 metres.

Yimer won the 10,000 m title at the 2018 African Athletics Championships in Asaba, Nigeria, and placed third in the event at the 2019 African Games held in Rabat, Morocco.

He finished third at the 2021 Boston Marathon with a time of 2:10:38.

Yimer is a two-time winner of the Clearer Water Antrim Coast Half Marathon, with victories in the 2021 and 2022 editions of the race, with times of 1:00:30 and 59:04 respectively.

== Personal bests ==
- 10,000 metres – 26:54.39 (Hengelo 2019)
- 10 kilometres – 27:50 (Atlanta, GA 2022)
- Half marathon – 58:33 (Valencia 2018) NR
- Marathon – 2:06:08 (Seoul 2024)
