= Dera Dida =

Ethiopian long-distance runner

Personal information
- Full name: Dera Dida Yami
- Nationality: Ethiopian
- Born: 26 October 1996 (age 29)

Sport
- Sport: Athletics
- Event: Long-distance running
Medal record
Women's athletics
Representing Ethiopia
African Games
Bronze medal – third place	2019 Rabat	10,000 m
African Championships
Bronze medal – third place	2016 Durban	5000 m
World Cross Country Championships
Silver medal – second place	2019 Aarhus	Senior race
Silver medal – second place	2015 Guiyang	Junior race
World Marathon Majors
Silver medal – second place	2025 Berlin	Marathon
Bronze medal – third place	2026 Berlin	Marathon

Dera Dida Yami (born 26 October 1996) is an Ethiopian long-distance runner. She competed in the women's 10,000 metres at the 2017 World Championships in Athletics, ranking 14th in 31:51:75. In 2019, she won the silver medal in the senior women's race at the 2019 IAAF World Cross Country Championships held in Aarhus, Denmark. At the 2019 African Games, she won the bronze medal in the women's 10,000 metres event.

== Achievements ==
=== Personal bests ===
- 5000 metres – 14:42.84 (Rome 2016)
- 10,000 metres – 30:51.86 (Hengelo 2019)

Road

- 5 kilometres – 15:24 (Rennes 2015)
- 10 kilometres – 31:40 (Port-Gentil 2024)
- Half marathon – 1:07:47 (Herzogenaurach 2023)
- Marathon – 2:16:55 (Berlin 2026)

=== National championships ===
- Ethiopian Athletics Championship titles
  - 5000 metres: 2016
  - 10,000 metres: 2017
