= Athletics at the 2019 African Games – Women's 3000 metres steeplechase =

The women's 3000 metres steeplechase event at the 2019 African Games was held on 28 August in Rabat.

== Results ==
Rank	Name	Nationality	Time	Notes
1st place, gold medalist(s)	Mekides Abebe	Ethiopia	9:35.18	
2nd place, silver medalist(s)	Mercy Wanjiru Gitahi	Kenya	9:37.53	
3rd place, bronze medalist(s)	Weynshet Ansa	Ethiopia	9:38.56	
4	Birtukan Admu	Ethiopia	9:44.86	
5	Ikram Ouaaziz	Morocco	10:03.64	
6	Marwa Bouzayani	Tunisia	10:07.33	
