= Dolshi Tesfu =

Eritrean long-distance runner

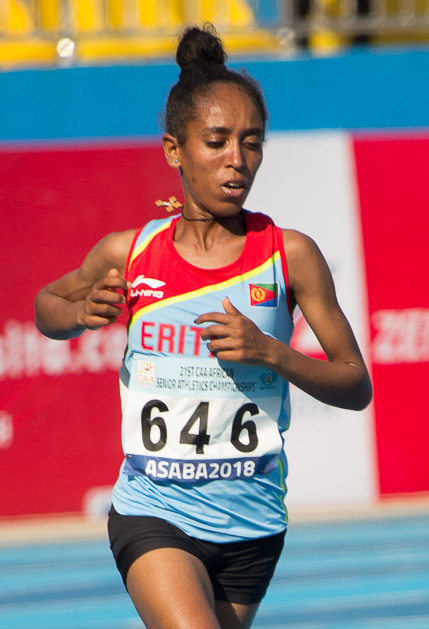
- Dolshi Tesfu of Eritrea at the 2018 African Athletics Championships

Personal information
- Born: 17 June 1999 (age 27)

Sport
- Country: Eritrea
- Sport: Athletics
- Event: Long-distance running

Dolshi Tesfu (born 17 June 1999) is an Eritrean long-distance runner. She competed in the senior women's race at the 2019 IAAF World Cross Country Championships held in Aarhus, Denmark. She finished in 38th place.

In 2017, she competed in the junior women's race at the 2017 IAAF World Cross Country Championships held in Kampala, Uganda. She finished in 28th place.

In 2018, she competed in the women's half marathon at the 2018 IAAF World Half Marathon Championships held in Valencia, Spain. She finished in 20th place.

In 2019, she competed in the women's half marathon at the 2019 African Games held in Rabat, Morocco. She finished in 10th place.

She competed at the 2020 Summer Olympics in the women's 10,000m event.
