= Athletics at the 2019 African Games – Women's 10,000 metres =

The women's 10,000 metres event at the 2019 African Games was held on 29 August in Rabat.

== Results ==
Rank	Name	Nationality	Time	Notes
1st place, gold medalist(s)	Tsehay Gemechu	Ethiopia	31:56.92	
2nd place, silver medalist(s)	Zeineba Yimer	Ethiopia	31:57.95	
3rd place, bronze medalist(s)	Dera Dida	Ethiopia	31:58.78	
4	Irene Jepchumba	Kenya	32:05.12	
5	Caroline Nyaga	Kenya	32:24.17	
6	Monica Chirchir	Kenya	32:43.63	
7	Rachael Zena Chebet	Uganda	32:48.03	
8	Marthe Yankurije	Rwanda	33:17.87	
9	Yodit Abraham Kahsay	Eritrea	34:35.17	
	Isatu Turay	Sierra Leone	DNS	
	Stella Chesang	Uganda	DNS	
