= Meseret Belete =

Ethiopian long-distance runner

Meseret Belete Tola
Personal information
- Born: 16 September 1999 (age 26)

Sport
- Country: Ethiopia
- Sport: Athletics
- Event: Long-distance running
Medal record
Women's athletics
Representing Ethiopia
World Championships (HM)
| Gold medal – first place | 2018 Valencia | Team |
African Games
| Bronze medal – third place | 2019 Rabat | Half marathon |

Meseret Belete Tola (born 16 September 1999) is an Ethiopian long-distance runner. She represented Ethiopia at the 2019 African Games in Rabat, Morocco and she won the bronze medal in the women's half marathon.

== Career ==
In 2018, she won the Gothenburg Half Marathon in Gothenburg, Sweden.

At the 2018 World Half Marathon Championships in Valencia, Spain she finished in 6th place in the women's individual race. In the team event, together with Netsanet Gudeta and Zeineba Yimer, she won the gold medal with a combined time of 3:22:27.

== Achievements ==
| Year | Competition | Venue | Position | Event | Notes |
Representing Ethiopia
| 2018 | Gothenburg Half Marathon | Gothenburg, Sweden | 1st | Half marathon | 1:09:06 |
| 2018 | World Half Marathon Championships | Valencia, Spain | 6th | Half marathon | 1:08:09 |
| 2018 | World Half Marathon Championships | Valencia, Spain | 1st | Team | 3:22:27 |
| 2019 | African Games | Rabat, Morocco | 3rd | Half marathon | 1:12:08 |
| 2023 | Amsterdam Marathon | Amsterdam, Netherlands | 1st | Marathon | 2:18:21 |
