= Athletics at the 2019 African Games – Men's 20 kilometres walk =

The men's 20 kilometres walk event at the 2019 African Games was held on 28 August in Rabat.

== Results ==
Rank	Name	Nationality	Time	Notes
1st place, gold medalist(s)	Samuel Gathimba	Kenya	1:22:48	
2nd place, silver medalist(s)	Yohanis Algaw	Ethiopia	1:22:50	
3rd place, bronze medalist(s)	Wayne Snyman	South Africa	1:23:38	
4	Simon Muriithi Wachira	Kenya	1:24:40	
5	Mohamed Saleh Ragab	Egypt	1:29:42	
6	Tadilo Getu	Ethiopia	1:29:57	
7	Allouch Othman	Morocco	1:30:08	
8	Birara Alem	Ethiopia	1:34:50	
9	Jerome Caprice	Mauritius	1:36:27	
