= Athletics at the 2019 African Games – Men's javelin throw =

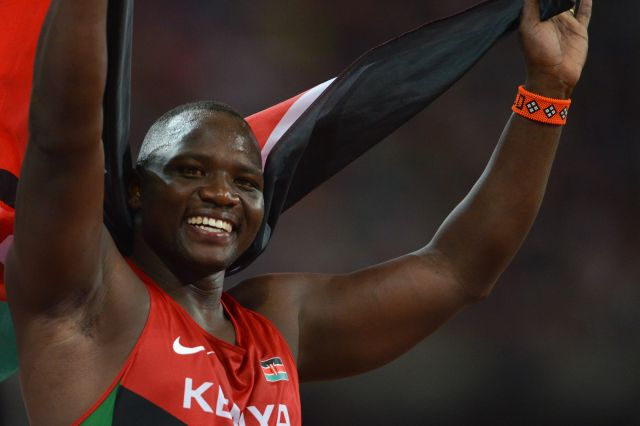
Julius Yego at World championship in athletics 2015

The men's javelin throw event at the 2019 African Games was held on 30 August in Rabat.

== Results ==
Rank	Name	Nationality	#1	#2	#3	#4	#5	#6	Result	Notes
1st place, gold medalist(s)	Julius Yego	Kenya	x	79.17	87.73	80.20	–	–	87.73	GR
2nd place, silver medalist(s)	Alexander Kiprotich	Kenya	x	77.50	x	75.28	x	77.24	77.50	
3rd place, bronze medalist(s)	Nnamdi Chinecherem	Nigeria	73.24	61.17	x	67.34	x	67.96	73.24	
4	Othow Okello	Ethiopia	69.79	66.18	65.84	71.55	67.88	x	71.55	
5	Claude Chamaken	Cameroon	66.27	62.27	71.44	63.26	x	68.85	71.44	
6	Ubang Ubank	Ethiopia	71.28	67.27	62.64	x	x	–	71.28	
7	Abdellah Charaii	Morocco	68.42	69.56	69.19	68.47	69.94	x	69.94	
8	Kereyu Bulala	Ethiopia	67.58	65.05	69.91	67.35	65.28	x	69.91	
9	Samuel Kure	Nigeria	69.55	x	69.23				69.55	
10	Maged Mohser El Badry	Egypt	69.33	68.15	67.92				69.33	
11	Lormans Mansiantima-Yitu	Democratic Republic of the Congo	x	37.64	36.29				37.64	
