= Andamlak Belihu =

Ethiopian long-distance runner

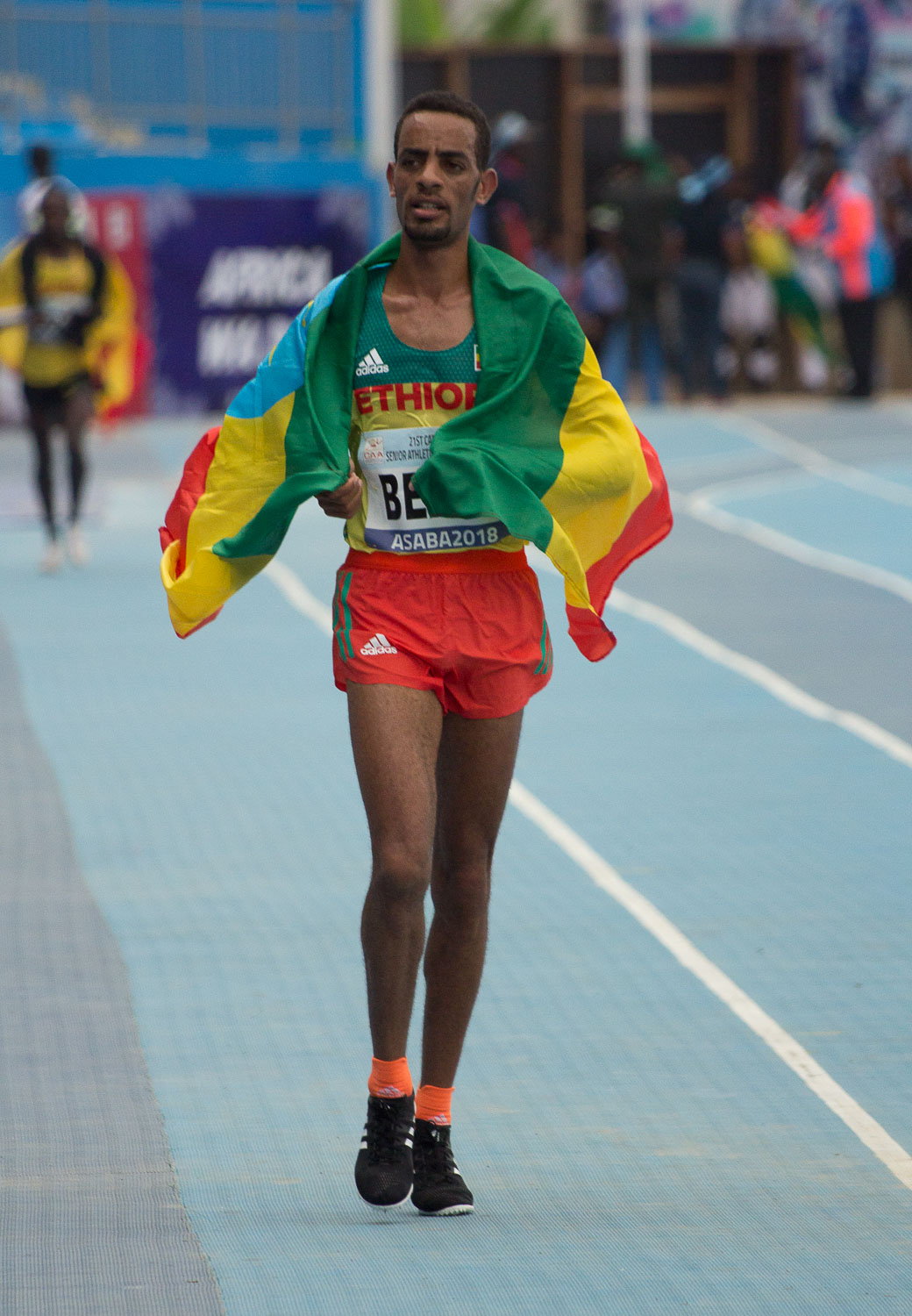
- Andamlak Belihu Berta at the 2018 African Championships

Personal information
- Born: 20 November 1998 (age 27) Gurage, Ethiopia

Sport
- Sport: Track and field Cross country
- Event: 10000 metres
Medal record
Men's athletics
Representing Ethiopia
African Championships
Silver medal – second place	2018 Asaba	10,000 m

Andamlak Belihu (born 20 November 1998) is an Ethiopian long-distance runner. He competed in the 10,000 metres at the 2017 World Athletics Championships, where he finished 10th with a time of 27:08.94. In 2019, he competed in the men's 10,000 metres at the 2019 World Athletics Championships held in Doha, Qatar. He finished in 5th place.

== Personal bests ==
Outdoor

- 10,000 metres – 27:08.94 (London 2017)
- Half marathon – 59:10 (New Delhi Half Marathon 2019)
- Marathon - 2:06:40 (Berlin Marathon 2022)

Road

- 10 kilometres – 27:48 (Ottawa 2018)
