= Tsehay Gemechu =

Ethiopian athlete (born 1998)

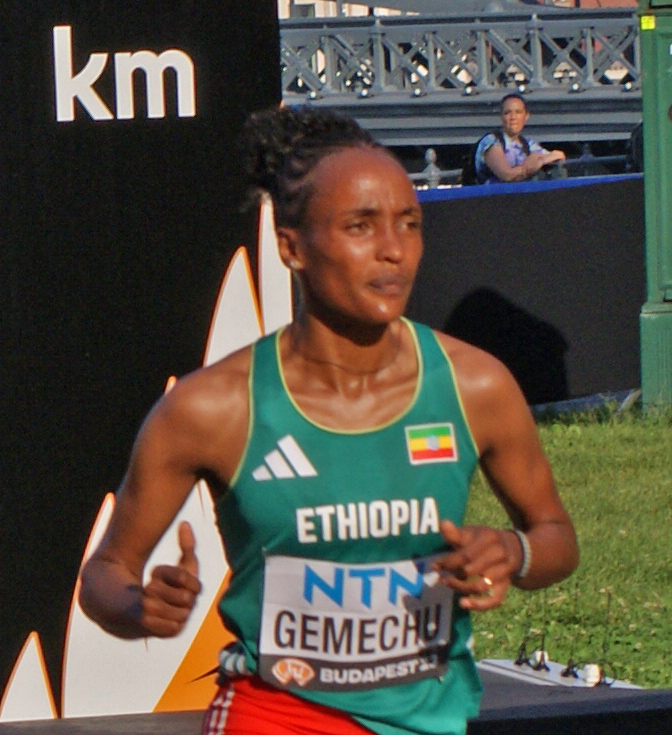
- Gemechu at the 2023 World Athletics Championships

Personal information
- Full name: Tsehay Gemechu Beyan
- Nationality: Ethiopian
- Born: 12 December 1998 (age 27)

Sport
- Sport: Athletics
- Event: Long-distance running

Achievements and titles
- Personal bests: 3000 m: 8:33.42 (Doha 2020); 5000 m: 14:29.60 (Doha 2019); 10,000 m: 30:19.29 (Hengelo 2021); Half marathon: 1:05.01 (Larne 2023)
Medal record
Women's athletics
Representing Ethiopia
African Games
Gold medal – first place	2019 Rabat	10,000 m
World Cross Country Championships
Gold medal – first place	2019 Aarhus	Senior team

Tsehay Gemechu (born 12 December 1998) is an Ethiopian long-distance runner. She finished fourth in the 5000 metres at the 2019 World Athletics Championships. Gemechu won the 10,000 metres at the 2019 African Games.

Gemechu is currently serving a four-year ban set to end in November 2027 for an anti-doping rule violation relating to abnormalities in her Athlete Biological Passport.

== Career ==
Tsehay Gemechu twice won the Delhi Half Marathon (2018, 2019), setting new consecutive course records. She placed second at the Great Ethiopian Run, a 10 km road race in Addis Ababa, in 2018.

In 2019, she won the 10K Valencia Ibercaja, setting a new national record of 30:15 and slicing 15 seconds off Tirunesh Dibaba's previous best. She competed in the senior women's race at the World Cross Country Championships held in Aarhus, Denmark in March of that year, finishing in sixth place and helping Ethiopia take team title. In August, Gemechu took victory in the 10,000 metres at the African Games in Rabat, Morocco, and in October, placed fourth in the 5000 metres event at the Doha World Championships in Qatar.

Gemechu received a four-year ban in October 2024, backdated to the provisional suspension issued in November 2023, for an anti-doping rule violation indicated by abnormalities in her Athlete Biological Passport. All her results from March 2020 onwards were disqualified.

From 2020 to 2023 Gemechu had competed in various events, including the 2020 Tokyo Olympics 10,000 metres, the Copenhagen and Lisbon Half Marathons, the Istanbul Half Marathon, the Antrim Coast Half Marathon, and both the Amsterdam and Tokyo Marathons. However, all her results from March 2020 onwards, including these performances, were subsequently disqualified due to the anti-doping rule violation.

== Personal bests ==
- 5000 metres – 14:29.60 (Doha 2019)
- 10,000 metres – 30:53.11 (Hengelo 2019)
- 10 kilometres – 30:15 (Valencia 2019)
- Half marathon – 1:06:00 (New Delhi 2019)
