= Athletics at the 2019 African Games – Women's 20 kilometres walk =

The women's 20 kilometres walk event at the 2019 African Games was held on 28 August in Rabat.

== Results ==
Rank	Name	Nationality	Time	Notes
1st place, gold medalist(s)	Emily Wamusyi Ngii	Kenya	1:34:41	GR
2nd place, silver medalist(s)	Grace Wanjiru Njue	Kenya	1:34:57	
3rd place, bronze medalist(s)	Yehualeye Beletew	Ethiopia	1:35:21	
4	Chahinez Nasri	Tunisia	1:36:28	
5	Souad Azzi	Algeria	1:38:48	
6	Mare Betwe	Ethiopia	1:41:00	
7	Fadekemi Olude	Nigeria	1:41:21	
8	Aynalem Eshetu	Ethiopia	1:44:41	
9	Amera Zenhom Mahmoud Ibrahim	Egypt	1:50:54	
