= Athletics at the 2019 African Games – Men's 10,000 metres =

The men's 10,000 metres event at the 2019 African Games was held on 27 August in Rabat.

== Results ==
Rank	Name	Nationality	Time	Notes
1st place, gold medalist(s)	Berehanu Tsegu	Ethiopia	27:56.81	
2nd place, silver medalist(s)	Aron Kifle	Eritrea	27:57.79	
3rd place, bronze medalist(s)	Jemal Yimer	Ethiopia	27:59.02	
4	Edwin Soi	Kenya	28:05.70	
5	Noël Hitimana	Rwanda	28:11.84	
6	Onesphore Nzikwinkunda	Burundi	28:11.90	
7	Abadi Hadis	Ethiopia	28:27.38	
8	Samuel Kibet	Uganda	28:32.89	
9	Awet Habte	Eritrea	28:36.30	
10	Jamal Hitrane	Morocco	28:48.58	
11	Mande Bushendich	Uganda	28:59.66	
12	Dejen Tesfalem	Eritrea	29:12.77	
13	Kefasi Chitsala	Malawi	30:10.27	
14	Chauncy Master	Malawi	30:59.64	
15	Alpha Kabanga Mulumba	Democratic Republic of the Congo	33:34.53	
	Osman Challey	Sierra Leone	DNF	
	Paul Kipngetich Tanui	Kenya	DNF	
	Samuel Freire	Cape Verde	DNF	
	Charles Yosei Muneria	Kenya	DNF	
	Moumin Bouh Guelleh	Djibouti	DNS	
	Toka Badboy	Lesotho	DNS	
