= Berehanu Tsegu =

Ethiopian long-distance runner

Personal information
- Full name: Berehanu Wendemu Tsegu
- Born: 30 September 1999 (age 26)

Sport
- Country: Ethiopia
- Sport: Long-distance running

Berehanu Wendemu Tsegu (born 30 September 1999) is an Ethiopian long-distance runner. He holds a personal best of 27:00.73 minutes for the 10,000 metres. He was the 10,000 metres champion at 2019 African Games.

He finished second at the 2018 Corrida de Houilles. In 2019, he also won the Yangzhou Jianzhen International Half Marathon with a time of 59:56, only four seconds slower than the course record at the time.

He tested positive for erythropoietin (EPO), a banned blood booster, at the 2019 Copenhagen Half Marathon. Though he initially disputed the results, he later admitted to the violation and received a four-year ban from the sport. This occurred during a period where World Athletics had highlighted Ethiopia as a country at risk of widespread doping, which was followed by the launch of an education programme by the Ethiopian Athletics Federation.

== See also ==
- List of doping cases in athletics
