= Mekides Abebe =

Ethiopian steeplechase runner (born 2001)

Personal information
- Nationality: Ethiopian
- Born: 29 July 2001 (age 24)

Sport
- Sport: Athletics
- Event: Steeplechase
Medal record
Women's athletics
Representing Ethiopia
World Championships
Bronze medal – third place	2022 Eugene	3000 m st.
Youth Olympic Games
Silver medal – second place	2018 Buenos Aires	2000 m st.
African Games
Gold medal – first place	2019 Rabat	3000 m st.

Mekides Abebe Demewoz (born 29 July 2001) is an Ethiopian athlete specializing in the 3000 metres steeplechase. She competed in the women's 3000 metres steeplechase event at the 2019 World Athletics Championships.

She won the gold medal in the women's 3000 metres steeplechase at the 2019 African Games and the silver medal in the women's 2000 metre steeplechase at the 2018 Youth Olympics.

She competed in the women's 3000 metres steeplechase at the 2020 Summer Olympics.
