= Evans Omondi =

Kenyan footballer

Personal information
- Date of birth: 12 November 1979 (age 46)
- Position: Goalkeeper

Senior career*
Years	Team	Apps	(Gls)
2005–2006	World Hope		
2006–2008	Chemelil Sugar		
2009–2010	SoNy Sugar	25	(0)
2011	Congo United	19	(0)
2012–2014	Nakuru AllStars	8	(0)

International career
2007	Kenya	1	(0)
- * Club domestic league appearances and goals

Evans Omondi (born 12 December 1979) is a Kenyan former footballer who played as a goalkeeper.

== Career ==
Omondi has played club football for World Hope, Chemelil Sugar, SoNy Sugar, Congo United and Nakuru AllStars.

He earned one cap for the Kenyan national team in 2007.
