= Athletics at the 2019 African Games – Women's 5000 metres =

The women's 5000 metres event at the 2019 African Games was held on 26 August in Rabat.

== Results ==
Rank	Name	Nationality	Time	Notes
1st place, gold medalist(s)	Lilian Kasait Rengeruk	Kenya	15:33.63	
2nd place, silver medalist(s)	Hawi Feysa	Ethiopia	15:33.99	
3rd place, bronze medalist(s)	Alemitu Tariku	Ethiopia	15:37.15	
4	Sarah Chelangat	Uganda	15:38.11	
5	Ejegayehu Taye	Ethiopia	15:39.94	
6	Lydia Jeruto Lagat	Kenya	15:43.56	
7	Stella Chesang	Uganda	15:49.87	
8	Cavaline Nahimana	Burundi	15:57.13	
9	Kaoutar Farkoussi	Morocco	15:57.90	
10	Fortunate Chidzivo	Zimbabwe	16:08.59	
11	Semira Firezghi	Eritrea	17:03.37	
12	Mokulubete Makatisi	Lesotho	17:18.92	
13	Awa Kleinmann	Mali	17:25.89	
14	Matsogny de Narvelle Gerlucherie	Republic of the Congo	17:35.59	
15	Bernadette Bigonda	Democratic Republic of the Congo	18:24.40	
16	Isatu Turay	Sierra Leone	18:55.39	
17	Moneyi Chingaipe	Malawi	18:57.64	
	Sihame Hilali	Morocco	DNS	
