= Athletics at the 2019 African Games – Men's 5000 metres =

The men's 5000 metres event at the 2019 African Games was held on 30 August in Rabat.

== Results ==
Rank	Name	Nationality	Time	Notes
1st place, gold medalist(s)	Robert Kiprop	Kenya	13:30.96	
2nd place, silver medalist(s)	Edward Zakayo	Kenya	13:31.40	
3rd place, bronze medalist(s)	Richard Yator	Kenya	13:31.41	
4	Abe Gashahun	Ethiopia	13:32.29	
5	Oscar Chelimo	Uganda	13:32.96	
6	Antenayehu Dagnachew	Ethiopia	13:37.85	
7	Soufiane Boukantar	Morocco	13:38.87	
8	Bouh Ibrahim	Djibouti	13:39.37	
9	Stephen Kissa	Uganda	13:43.79	
10	Gemechu Dida	Ethiopia	13:46.40	
11	Awet Habte	Eritrea	13:46.80	
12	Yohans Kifle	Eritrea	13:49.08	
13	Mouhcine Outalha	Morocco	13:51.28	
14	Jamal Abdi Direh	Djibouti	13:52.29	
15	Toka Badboy	Lesotho	14:04.40	
16	Rodrigue Kwizera	Burundi	14:09.35	
17	Tesfu Tewelde	Eritrea	14:16.55	
18	Kefasi Chitsala	Malawi	14:18.39	
19	Samuel Freire	Cape Verde	14:19.21	
20	Abdelmunaim Abdalla	Sudan	14:38.12	
21	Moses Tarakinyu	Zimbabwe	14:46.65	
22	Ali Hisseine Mahamat	Chad	14:47.21	
23	Chauncy Master	Malawi	14:55.27	
24	Kulang Kulang	South Sudan	15:01.03	
25	Iven Moise	Seychelles	15:02.28	
26	Osman Challey	Sierra Leone	15:43.52	
27	Abidine Abidine	Mauritania	15:52.09	
	Gabriel Gerald Geay	Tanzania	DNS	
	Abdalaati Iguider	Morocco	DNS	
	Alex Ngouari-Mouissi	Republic of the Congo	DNS	
	Samuel Kibet	Uganda	DNS	
