= Yohanis Algaw =

Ethiopian race walker

Personal information
- Nationality: Ethiopian
- Born: Wale Yohanis Algaw; 14 August 1999 (age 26)
- Height: 180 cm (5 ft 11 in)
- Weight: 70 kg (154 lb)

Sport
- Country: Ethiopia
- Sport: Athletics
- Events: 10 km race walk, 20 km race walk

Yohanis Algaw (14 August 1999) is an Ethiopian race walker.

== Honor and achievements ==
Year	Competition	Position	Event	Time	Wind (m/s)	Venue	Notes
2016	World U20 Championships	4th	10,000 Metres Race Walk	40:55:96		Zdzislaw Krzyszkowiak Stadium, Bydgoszcz, Poland	
2017	African U20 Championships	1st	10,000 Metres Race Walk	44:43:47		Tlemcen, Algeria	
2018	National Championships	1st	20 Kilometres Race Walk	1:26:16		Addis Ababa, Ethiopia	
2019	National Championships	1st	10,000 Metres Race Walk	42:41:6h		Addis Ababa, Ethiopia	
2019	All African Games	2nd	20 Kilometres Race Walk	1:22:50		Prince Moulay Abdellah Stadium, Rabat, Morocco	
2022	African Championships	3rd	20 Kilometres Race Walk	1:22:21		Côte d'Or National Sports Complex, St Pierre, Mauritius	
