= Athletics at the 2019 African Games – Women's 1500 metres =

The women's 1500 metres event at the 2019 African Games was held on 29 and 30 August in Rabat.

== Medalists ==
Gold	Silver	Bronze
Quailyne Jebiwott Kiprop; Kenya	Mary Kuria; Kenya	Lemlem Hailu; Ethiopia

== Results ==
=== Heats ===
Qualification: First 4 in each heat (Q) and the next 4 fastest (q) advanced to the final.

Rank	Heat	Name	Nationality	Time	Notes
1	2	Lemlem Hailu	Ethiopia	4:13.92	Q
2	2	Loice Chemnung	Kenya	4:14.06	Q
3	2	Malika Akkaoui	Morocco	4:15.46	Q
4	2	Rahel Daniel	Eritrea	4:16.22	Q
5	2	Neide Dias	Angola	4:18.59	q
6	2	Haifa Tarchoun	Tunisia	4:25.11	q
7	1	Quailyne Jebiwott Kiprop	Kenya	4:28.11	Q
8	1	Halima Hachlaf	Morocco	4:28.99	Q
9	1	Mary Kuria	Kenya	4:29.14	Q
10	1	Esther Chebet	Uganda	4:29.59	Q
11	1	Adanech Anbesa	Ethiopia	4:30.62	q
12	2	Kadra Mohamed Dembil	Djibouti	4:32.46	q
13	1	Matsogny de Narvelle Gerlucherie	Republic of the Congo	4:40.13	
14	2	Mirriam Kachingwe	Malawi	4:52.38	
15	1	Mado Ngalula Aminata	Democratic Republic of the Congo	4:54.70	
16	2	Moneyi Chingaipe	Malawi	4:59.59	
	1	Carla Mendes	Cape Verde	DNS	
	1	Tsepang Sello	Lesotho	DNS	
	1	Sihame Hilali	Morocco	DNS	
	2	Mokulubete Makatisi	Lesotho	DNS	

=== Final ===
Rank	Name	Nationality	Time	Notes
1st place, gold medalist(s)	Quailyne Jebiwott Kiprop	Kenya	4:19.33	
2nd place, silver medalist(s)	Mary Kuria	Kenya	4:20.19	
3rd place, bronze medalist(s)	Lemlem Hailu	Ethiopia	4:20.60	
4	Malika Akkaoui	Morocco	4:20.64	
5	Esther Chebet	Uganda	4:21.04	
6	Halima Hachlaf	Morocco	4:22.59	
7	Loice Chemnung	Kenya	4:24.14	
8	Neide Dias	Angola	4:24.99	
9	Adanech Anbesa	Ethiopia	4:25.84	
10	Rahel Daniel	Eritrea	4:27.04	
11	Kadra Mohamed Dembil	Djibouti	4:34.95	
	Haifa Tarchoun	Tunisia	DNF	
