= Mercy Wanjiru Gitahi =

Kenyan athletics competitor

Mercy Wanjirū Gìtahi
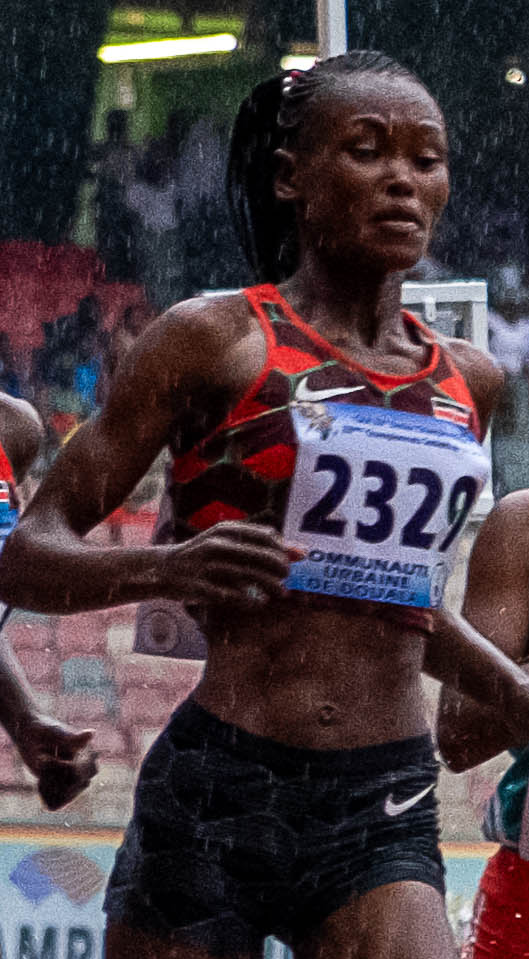
- Gitahi in 2024

Personal information
- Born: 28 March 1993 (age 33)
- Employer: Kenya Defence Forces

Sport
- Country: Kenya
- Sport: Athletics
- Events: Steeplechase 3000m and 5000m

Mercy Wanjirū Gìtahi (born 28 March 1993) is a Kenyan athlete. She specializes in the steeplechase.

== Career ==
In June 2019, Gìtahi won the Kenyan Athletics Championships Track and Field Weekend Meet's 3000m steeplechase, with a time of 9:30.3, and the 5000m steeplechase, with a time of 15:50.9. At the 2019 African Games in Rabat, she won the silver medal for the women's 3000m steeplechase with a time of 9:37.53. Also in 2019, she came second in the 5000m steeplechase at the Guldensporenmeeting in Kortrijk, Belgium.

Gìtahi is a member of the Kenya Defence Forces, based at Lanet Barracks. She has participated in the Kenya Defence Forces Championships, winning the 3000m event. She finished fourth at the 2019 CISM Military World Games race in Wuhan, China, with a time of 9:39.58 minutes.

In 2020, Gìtahi won both 3000m steeplechase and 5,000m steeplechase races at the Kenyan Athletics Championships in Kasarani, with times of 10:02.8 and 15.59.8 respectively.

In May 2024, Gìtahi won the Kenyan Athletics Championships 3000m steeplechase, with a time of 9:45.08, and the 5000m steeplechase, with a time of 15:36.20. In June 2024, she finished sixth at the African Athletics Championships in Douala, with a time of 9:52.75. She also participated in trials for the Kenyan team's 3000m steeplechase event entry at the 2024 Summer Olympics in Paris, France, coming sixth with a time of 9:57.37.
