= Degitu Azimeraw =

Ethiopian long-distance runner

Personal information
- Nationality: Ethiopian
- Born: Degitu Azimeraw Asires; 24 January 1999 (age 27) Ethiopia
- Occupation: long-distance runner
- Years active: 2017–present
- Agent: NN Running Team

Sport
- Country: Ethiopia
- Sport: Athletics
- Events: Marathon, Half marathon, 10,000m, Cross Country
- Coached by: Tessema Abshero

Achievements and titles
- Personal bests: Marathon: 2:17:58 (2021); Half marathon: 1:06:07 (2019); 10,000m: 31:03.32 (2019)
Medal record
Athletics
Representing Ethiopia
Silver medal – second place	2019 African Games	Half marathon
Gold medal – first place	2019 Amsterdam Marathon	Marathon
Silver medal – second place	2021 London Marathon	Marathon
Gold medal – first place	2024 Barcelona Marathon	Marathon

Degitu Azimeraw Asires (born 24 January 1999) is an Ethiopian long-distance runner who competes in marathon, half marathon, and track events. She is a silver medalist at the African Games and has achieved podium finishes in World Marathon Majors.

== Career ==
Degitu Azimeraw began her international career as a teenager, winning the 2017 Tata Steel Kolkata 25K in her first international race with a course record of 1:26:01. In 2018, she significantly improved her to 1:06:47 at the RAK Half Marathon and won the Gifu Half Marathon in Japan.

In 2019, she further lowered her personal best to 1:06:07 at the RAK Half Marathon. Representing Ethiopia, she won a silver medal in the women's half marathon at the 2019 African Games in Rabat, Morocco, finishing in 1:10:31. Later that year, in her marathon debut, she won the 2019 Amsterdam Marathon in a course record time of 2:19:26, which was the second fastest debut marathon time for a woman in history.

In 2020, Azimeraw competed at the 2020 RAK Half Marathon, placing ninth with 1:07:02, and finished sixth at the 2020 Valencia Marathon in 2:19:56. In 2021, she set a new personal best of 2:17:58 to finish second at the 2021 London Marathon, placing her 11th on the all-time list at the time. She also won the 10K at the Nationale Nederlanden San Silvestre in Madrid with a time of 30:26.

After a period of time away for family in 2022–2023, Azimeraw returned to competition. In March 2024, she emerged victorious at the 2024 Barcelona Marathon, clocking 2:19:52 in her first marathon post-pregnancy, leading an Ethiopian podium sweep. She competed at the 2025 Tokyo Marathon, finishing eighth with a time of 2:20:26.

== Achievements ==
Year	Race	Place	Position	Time
2017	Tata Steel Kolkata 25K	Kolkata	1st	1:26:01 (CR)
2018	RAK Half Marathon	Ras Al Khaimah	6th	1:06:47 (WJR)
2018	Gifu Half Marathon	Gifu	1st	1:09:53
2019	RAK Half Marathon	Ras Al Khaimah	4th	1:06:07 (PB)
2019	2019 African Games	Rabat	2nd	1:10:31
2019	Amsterdam Marathon	Amsterdam	1st	2:19:26 (CR, PB)
2020	RAK Half Marathon	Ras Al Khaimah	9th	1:07:02
2020	Valencia Marathon	Valencia	6th	2:19:56
2021	2021 London Marathon	London	2nd	2:17:58 (PB)
2021	Nationale Nederlanden San Silvestre Vallecana 10K	Madrid	1st	30:26
2024	Barcelona Marathon	Barcelona	1st	2:19:52
2025	2025 Tokyo Marathon	Tokyo	8th	2:20:26
