= 2017 IAAF World Cross Country Championships – Senior women's race =

Senior women's race at the 2017 IAAF World Cross Country Championships
- Organisers: IAAF
- Date: March 26
- Host city: Kampala, Uganda
- Events: 1
- Distances: 10 km – Senior women (9.858 km)
- Participation: 104 athletes from 31 nations

The Senior women's race at the 2017 IAAF World Cross Country Championships was held at the Kampala in Uganda, on March 26, 2017.

The exact length of the course was 9,858 m (33m start, 4 full laps of 2,000 m and a final lap of 1,825m).

Complete results for individuals.

Louisa Leballo finished in 33rd place but she was disqualified in July 2017.

== Race results ==
=== Senior women's race (10 km) ===
==== Individual ====
Rank	Athlete	Country	Time
1st place, gold medalist(s)	Irene Chepet Cheptai	Kenya	31:57
2nd place, silver medalist(s)	Alice Aprot Nawowuna	Kenya	32:02
3rd place, bronze medalist(s)	Lilian Kasait Rengeruk	Kenya	32:12
4	Hyvin Kiyeng Jepkemoi	Kenya	32:32
5	Agnes Jebet Tirop	Kenya	32:32
6	Faith Chepngetich Kipyegon	Kenya	32:49
7	Ruth Jebet	Bahrain	32:50
8	Belaynesh Oljira	Ethiopia	32:53
9	Rose Chelimo	Bahrain	33:01
10	Senbere Teferi	Ethiopia	33:12
11	Eunice Chebichii Chumba	Bahrain	33:26
12	Mercyline Chelangat	Uganda	33:29
13	Gebeyanesh Ayele	Ethiopia	33:31
14	Sentayehu Lewetegn	Ethiopia	33:33
15	Aliphine Chepkerker Tuliamuk	United States	33:43
16	Failuna Abdi Matanga	Tanzania	33:48
17	Rachael Zena Chebet	Uganda	33:58
18	Stella Chesang	Uganda	34:27
19	Cavaline Nahimana	Burundi	34:35
20	Trihas Gebre	Spain	34:37
21	Doreen Chemutai	Uganda	34:41
22	Stephanie Bruce	United States	34:42
23	Natosha Rogers	United States	34:47
24	Yuka Hori	Japan	34:54
25	Doreen Chesang	Uganda	34:55
26	Zerfie Limeneh	Ethiopia	34:59
27	Azucena Díaz	Spain	35:06
28	Magdalena Shauri	Tanzania	35:14
29	Emily Chebet	Uganda	35:17
30	Sarah Pagano	United States	35:18
31	Anna Kelly	Australia	35:21
32	Desi Mokonin	Bahrain	35:21
33	Gladys Tejeda	Peru	35:24
34	Nazret Weldu	Eritrea	35:34
35	Kesaoleboga Molotsane	South Africa	35:48
36	Jovana De La Cruz	Peru	35:48
37	Angelina Tsere	Tanzania	35:49
38	Louise Small	Great Britain	35:51
39	Mao Ichiyama	Japan	35:53
40	Sasha Gollish	Canada	35:56
41	Ana Lozano	Spain	36:03
42	Rebecca Murray	Great Britain	36:04
43	Kenza Dahmani Tifahi	Algeria	36:10
44	Simret Weldeghabr	Eritrea	36:10
45	Carmen Toaquiza	Ecuador	36:11
46	Victoria Coates	Canada	36:11
47	Elaina Balouris	United States	36:26
48	Soledad Torre	Peru	36:30
49	Maylelina Issa Mbua	Tanzania	36:31
50	Sara Ramadhani	Tanzania	36:32
51	Claire Sumner	Canada	36:36
52	Diana Landi	Ecuador	36:37
53	Amina Bettiche	Algeria	36:46
54	Ruth Kibreab	Eritrea	36:48
55	Teresa Urbina	Spain	36:49
56	Gemma Maini	Australia	36:55
57	Rima Chenah	Algeria	36:57
58	Julie-Anne Staehli	Canada	36:58
59	Fumika Sasaki	Japan	37:02
60	Nélida Sulca	Peru	37:05
61	Irene Pelayo	Spain	37:10
62	Claire Duck	Great Britain	37:12
63	Emily Ryan	Australia	37:12
64	Glenrose Xaba	South Africa	37:17
65	Nawal Yahi	Algeria	37:24
66	Lisa Brooking	Canada	37:25
67	Bontu Rebitu	Bahrain	37:28
68	Gayanthika Artigala Aberathna	Sri Lanka	37:32
69	Jessica Paguay	Ecuador	37:34
70	Sherilene Gelderblom	South Africa	37:35
71	Anna Emilie Møller	Denmark	37:36
72	Ciren Cuomu	China	37:38
73	Kokob Tesfagabriel	Eritrea	37:45
74	Kathryn Harrison	Canada	37:54
75	Rudo Mhonderwa	Zimbabwe	37:57
76	Emily Pritt	United States	37:59
77	Simone Christensen Glad	Denmark	38:05
78	Yohana Yemane	Eritrea	38:10
79	Virginia Moloney	Australia	38:20
80	Kaori Morita	Japan	38:24
81	Katherine Tisalema	Ecuador	38:38
82	Lexy Gilmour	Australia	39:11
83	Bridey Delaney	Australia	39:52
84	Riham Senani	Algeria	40:00
85	Siata Romanus Kalinga	Tanzania	40:13
86	Neheng Khatala	Lesotho	40:24
87	Eliane Saholinirina	Madagascar	41:15
88	Ruth Mwenya	Zambia	41:45
89	Emily Hosker-Thornhill	Great Britain	41:51
90	Mariama T. Jallow	Gambia	42:21
91	Unity Amos	Nigeria	42:48
92	Mema Tiango	Botswana	42:55
93	Mekhrangez Nazarova	Tajikistan	43:10
94	Nadia Dagher	Lebanon	43:39
95	Nomvula Ntshalintshali	Eswatini	44:05
96	Obilor Lorine	Nigeria	45:21
97	Sylvie Antoun	Lebanon	45:23
98	Hannah Adewale	Nigeria	46:09
99	Rose Lange	Nigeria	47:49
—	Louisa Leballo	South Africa	DQ
—	Dera Dida	Ethiopia	DNF
—	Lavinia Haitope	Namibia	DNF
—	Andrea Steyn	South Africa	DNF
—	Naomi Yunana	Nigeria	DNF

==== Teams ====
Rank	Team	Points
1st place, gold medalist(s)	Kenya: Irene Chepet Cheptai / 1; Alice Aprot Nawowuna / 2; Lilian Kasait Rengeruk / 3; Hyvin Kiyeng Jepkemoi / 4; (Agnes Jebet Tirop) / (5); (Faith Chepngetich Kipyegon) / (6)	10
2nd place, silver medalist(s)	Ethiopia: Belaynesh Oljira / 8; Senbere Teferi / 10; Gebeyanesh Ayele / 13; Sentayehu Lewetegn / 14; (Zerfie Limeneh) / (26); (Dera Dida) / (DNF)	45
3rd place, bronze medalist(s)	Bahrain: Ruth Jebet / 7; Rose Chelimo / 9; Eunice Chebichii Chumba / 11; Desi Mokonin / 32; (Bontu Rebitu) / (68)	59
4	Uganda: Mercyline Chelangat / 12; Rachael Zena Chebet / 17; Stella Chesang / 18; Doreen Chemutai / 21; (Doreen Chesang) / (25); (Emily Chebet) / (29)	68
5	United States: Aliphine Chepkerker Tuliamuk / 15; Stephanie Bruce / 22; Natosha Rogers / 23; Sarah Pagano / 30; (Elaina Balouris) / (48); (Emily Pritt) / (77)	90
6	Tanzania: Failuna Abdi Matanga / 16; Magdalena Shauri / 28; Angelina Tsere / 38; Maylelina Issa Mbua / 50; (Sara Ramadhani) / (51); (Siata Romanus Kalinga) / (86)	132
7	Spain: Trihas Gebre / 20; Azucena Díaz / 27; Ana Lozano / 42; Teresa Urbina / 56; (Irene Pelayo) / (62)	145
8	Peru: Gladys Tejeda / 34; Jovana De La Cruz / 37; Soledad Torre / 49; Nélida Sulca / 61	181
9	Canada: Sasha Gollish / 41; Victoria Coates / 47; Claire Sumner / 52; Julie-Anne Staehli / 59; (Lisa Brooking) / (67); (Kathryn Harrison) / (75)	199
10	South Africa: Louisa Leballo / 33; Kesaoleboga Molotsane / 36; Glenrose Xaba / 65; Sherilene Gelderblom / 71; (Andrea Steyn) / (DNF)	205
11	Japan: Yuka Hori / 24; Mao Ichiyama / 40; Fumika Sasaki / 60; Kaori Morita / 81	205
12	Eritrea: Nazret Weldu / 35; Simret Weldeghabr / 45; Ruth Kibreab / 55; Kokob Tesfagabr / 74; (Yohana Yemane) / (79)	209
13	Algeria: Kenza Dahmani Tifahi / 44; Amina Bettiche / 54; Rima Chenah / 58; Nawal Yahi / 66; (Riham Senani) / (85)	222
14	Australia: Anna Kelly / 31; Gemma Maini / 57; Emily Ryan / 64; Virginia Moloney / 80; (Lexy Gilmour) / (83); (Bridey Delaney) / (84)	232
15	Great Britain: Louise Small / 39; Rebecca Murray / 43; Claire Duck / 63; Emily Hosker-Thornhill / 90	235
16	Ecuador: Carmen Toaquiza / 46; Diana Landi / 53; Jessica Paguay / 70; Katherine Tisalema / 82	251
17	Nigeria: Unity Amos / 92; Obilor Lorine / 97; Hannah Adewale / 99; Rose Lange / 100; (Naomi Yunana) / (DNF)	388

- Note: Athletes in parentheses did not score for the team result.

== See also ==
- 2017 IAAF World Cross Country Championships – Junior men's race
- 2017 IAAF World Cross Country Championships – Senior men's race
- 2017 IAAF World Cross Country Championships – Junior women's race
- 2017 IAAF World Cross Country Championships – Mixed relay
