= Athletics at the 2019 Summer Universiade – Women's half marathon =

The women's half marathon event at the 2019 Summer Universiade was held on 13 July in Naples.

== Results ==
=== Individual ===
Official Video

Rank	Name	Nationality	Time	Notes
1st place, gold medalist(s)	Yuka Suzuki	Japan	1:14:10	
2nd place, silver medalist(s)	Rika Kaseda	Japan	1:14:32	
3rd place, bronze medalist(s)	Yuki Tagawa	Japan	1:14:36	
4	Deborah Schöneborn	Germany	1:15:03	
5	Li Zhixuan	China	1:15:14	
6	Citlali Cristian	Mexico	1:15:28	
7	Rebecca Murray	Great Britain	1:15:50	
8	Anna Kelly	Australia	1:16:06	
9	Anne-Marie Comeau	Canada	1:16:18	
10	Fatma Demir	Turkey	1:17:35	
11	Zhang Deshun	China	1:17:39	
12	Nurkhon Mukhiddinova	Uzbekistan	1:19:00	
13	Tereza Hrochová	Czech Republic	1:19:20	
14	Tubay Erdal	Turkey	1:19:25	
15	Sana El Mansouri	Morocco	1:19:28	
16	Alberte Pedersen	Denmark	1:19:42	
17	Jin Mingming	China	1:19:47	
18	Lina Kiriliuk	Lithuania	1:21:08	
19	Samantha Phillips	Australia	1:21:35	
20	Cornelia Stöckl-Moser	Austria	1:22:19	
21	Tyler Beling	South Africa	1:22:22	
22	Andreea Alina Piscu	Romania	1:24:30	
23	Lesego Mpshe	South Africa	1:26:26	
24	Marie Aagaard Poulsen	Denmark	1:27:35	
25	Nikita Vijayrao Raut	India	1:29:01	
26	Rachel Leistra	South Africa	1:30:27	
	Rabea Schöneborn	Germany	DNF	
	Veronika Zrastáková	Slovakia	DNF	
	Fatma Arık	Turkey	DNF	

=== Team ===
Rank	Team	Time	Notes
1st place, gold medalist(s)	Japan; Yuka Suzuki; Rika Kaseda; Yuki Tagawa	3:43:18	
2nd place, silver medalist(s)	China; Li Zhixuan; Zhang Deshun; Jin Mingming	3:52:40	
3rd place, bronze medalist(s)	South Africa; Tyler Beling; Lesego Mpshe; Rachel Leistra	4:19:15	
