= Athletics at the 2022 Asian Games – Women's marathon =

Women's marathon at the 2022 Asian Games
- Venue: Qiantang River Green Belt
- Date: 5 October 2023
- Competitors: 17 from 11 nations

Medalists
gold medal	Eunice Chumba	Bahrain
silver medal	Zhang Deshun	China
bronze medal	Sardana Trofimova	Kyrgyzstan

The women's marathon competition at the 2022 Asian Games took place on 5 October 2023 at the Qiantang River Green Belt, Hangzhou.

== Schedule ==
All times are China Standard Time (UTC+08:00)

Date	Time	Event
Thursday, 5 October 2023	07:10	Final

== Records ==
Prior to this competition, the existing world, Asian and Games records were as follows.

World Record	Tigst Assefa (ETH)	2:11:53	Berlin, Germany	24 September 2023
Asian Record	Mizuki Noguchi (JPN)	2:19:12	Berlin, Germany	25 September 2005
Games Record	Naoko Takahashi (JPN)	2:21:47	Bangkok, Thailand	6 December 1998

== Results ==
Legend

- DNF — Did not finish

Rank	Athlete	Time	Notes
1st place, gold medalist(s)	Eunice Chumba (BRN)	2:26:14	
2nd place, silver medalist(s)	Zhang Deshun (CHN)	2:27:55	
3rd place, bronze medalist(s)	Sardana Trofimova (KGZ)	2:28:41	
4	Li Zhixuan (CHN)	2:30:02	
5	Hikari Onishi (JPN)	2:30:06	
6	Choi Kyung-sun (KOR)	2:31:52	
7	Galbadrakhyn Khishigsaikhan (MGL)	2:35:34	
8	Kim Ji-hyang (PRK)	2:36:39	
9	Bayartsogtyn Mönkhzayaa (MGL)	2:37:07	
10	Odekta Elvina Naibaho (INA)	2:37:51	
11	Zhanna Mamazhanova (KAZ)	2:38:59	
12	Ri Kwang-ok (PRK)	2:39:35	
13	Mirai Waku (JPN)	2:40:54	
14	Jeong Da-eun (KOR)	2:41:51	
15	Tsao Chun-yu (TPE)	2:46:15	
16	Pushpa Bhandari (NEP)	3:02:37	
—	Desi Mokonin (BRN)	DNF	
