= Athletics at the 2019 Summer Universiade – Women's 10,000 metres =

The women's 10,000 metres event at the 2019 Summer Universiade was held on 8 July at the Stadio San Paolo in Naples.

== Results ==
| Rank | Name | Nationality | Time | Notes |
|---|---|---|---|---|
| 1st place, gold medalist(s) | Zhang Deshun | China | 34:03.31 | |
| 2nd place, silver medalist(s) | Rino Goshima | Japan | 34:04.65 | |
| 3rd place, bronze medalist(s) | Natsuki Sekiya | Japan | 34:05.84 | |
| 4 | Branna MacDougall | Canada | 34:09.81 | |
| 5 | Laura Dickinson | Canada | 34:17.95 | |
| 6 | Isobel Batt-Doyle | Australia | 34:21.45 | |
| 7 | Achash Kinetibeb | Ethiopia | 34:23.99 | PB |
| 8 | Jennifer Nesbitt | Great Britain | 34:27.50 | |
| 9 | Clare O'Brien | Australia | 34:42.55 | |
| 10 | Xia Yuyu | China | 34:49.18 | |
| 11 | Hannah Miller | New Zealand | 34:52.45 | |
| 12 | María de Jesús Ruiz | Mexico | 35:08.15 | |
| 13 | Andreea Piscu | Romania | 36:42.68 | |
| | Tsholofelo Masigo | South Africa | DNF | |
| | Knight Aciru | Uganda | DNF | |
