= Isobel Batt-Doyle =

Australian long-distance runner

Izzi Batt-Doyle
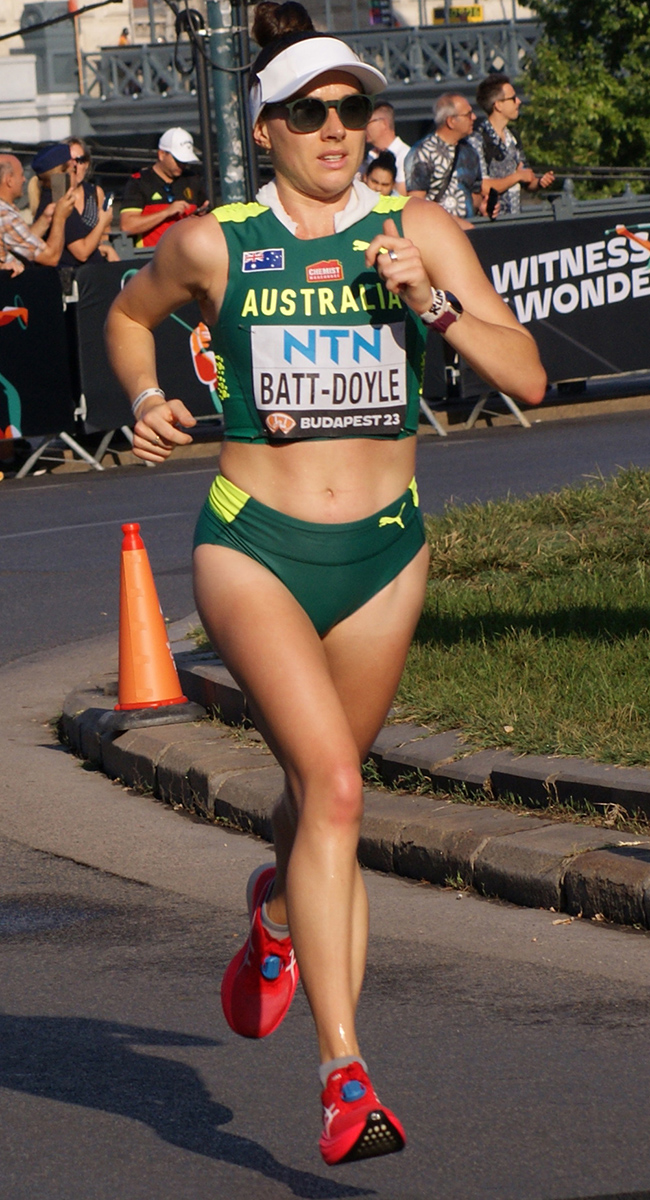
- Batt-Doyle in 2023

Personal information
- Full name: Isobel Batt-Doyle
- Born: 14 September 1995 (age 31) Fullarton, South Australia, Australia
- Employer: Asics
- Height: 1.63 m (5 ft 4 in)

Sport
- Country: Australia
- Sport: Track and Field
- Event: Long-distance running

Isobel Batt-Doyle (born 14 September 1995) is an Australian Olympic athlete and the Australian women's national record holder in the marathon.

== Early years ==
Batt-Doyle came from a family of runners. Her parents ran marathons, trail races and ultra running. When she was 8-years-old she started little athletics. A year later she ran in the Adelaide City Bay Fun Run. She ran the six kilometres holding her step dad's hand. Batt-Doyle regularly made the state team for cross country and then began track events when still an early teen.

After graduating from Seymour College in Adelaide, Batt-Doyle accepted a US college scholarship for running and went to St. John's University in New York. She transferred to University of Washington in Seattle for her second year. In 2016 and 2017, she decided to run longer distances and competed in 5000m and 10000m events.

== Achievements ==
Batt-Doyle made her debut for Australia at the 2017 World University Games in the 10,000m.

In 2019, she was the NCAA outdoor 10,000m bronze medalist and made the All-America First Team. She also made the All-America Second Team in the 5000m indoors.

In 2020, her boyfriend Riley Cocks took over her coaching. She ran significant personal bests over 3000m and 5000m. The highlight was coming second in the 10,000m at Zatopek in 31:43.26. It was a 37 seconds PB and elevated her from 21st to 10th on the Australian all-time list. (Zatopek is named after Emil Zatopek, the Czech long-distance runner, it is the most prestigious track race in Australia).

In January 2021, she finished second behind Rose Davies at the Australian 10,000m Championships in Melbourne. In May that year, she and Davies secured places in the 5000m at the delayed 2020 Tokyo Olympics as Batt-Doyle won in Nijmegen in a personal best time of 15 minutes 04.10 beating Uganda's Esther Chebet into second with Davies fourth. In the event's heat of the Tokyo Games, Batt-Doyle ran a time of 15:21.65 coming 15th and was therefore eliminated.

On 31 December 2022, she set a world female parkrun best mark of 15:25 at the Aldinga Beach event in Adelaide. She held the record until 23 December 2023, when it was beaten by Ciara Mageean.

On 5 February 2023, Batt-Doyle ran 1:09.27 at the Marugame half marathon in Japan, a new personal best for the distance.

She was one of six Australian women to meet the marathon qualifying standard for the 2024 Paris Olympics, however with only three spots available she was not selected for the team. On 19 June 2024, she lowered her 5000 metres personal best to 14:49.75 in Liege, Belgium. She competed in the 5000 metres at the 2024 Summer Olympics in Paris in August 2024.

On 2 February 2025, Batt-Doyle ran 1:07.17 at the Marugame half marathon in Japan, a new Australian record for the distance. In April, again competing on the roads, she broke her own Australian national 10km record of 31:12, running 30:44 at this ASICS Tokyo Speed Race. She ran a personal best of 30:51.27 for the 10,000 metres at the 2025 Bislett Games in Oslo on 11 June 2025.

On 2 August 2025, Batt-Doyle won the Beach to Beacon 10K road race in Cape Elizabeth, Maine. Her time of 31:25 bested notable competitors such as Fiona O'Keeffe and Edna Kiplagat. She also became the first Australian woman to win the world-class event. In September 2025, she competed over 10,000 metres at the 2025 World Championships in Tokyo, Japan, placing seventeenth.

On 11 October 2026, Batt-Doyle broke the Australian marathon record by nearly a minute at the Chicago Marathon, running 2:20:38, placing sixth overall.

== International competitions ==
Representing Australia
Year	Competition	Venue	Position	Event	Time
2026	Chicago Marathon	Chicago, Illinois	6th	Marathon	2:20:38
2025	Valencia Marathon	Valencia, Spain	7th	Marathon	2:23:35
2025	Nagoya Women's Marathon	Nagoya, Japan	6th	Marathon	2:23:29
2024	Valencia Marathon	Valencia, Spain	8th	Marathon	2:22:59
2024	Olympic Games	Paris, France	9th	5000m	15:03.64
2024	Yangtze Delta Athletics Diamond Gala	Suzhou, China	16th	5000m	15:06.84
2023	Valencia Marathon	Valencia, Spain	10th	Marathon	2:23:27
2023	World Road Running Championships	Riga, Latvia	14th	Half-marathon	1:10:08
2023	World Championships	Budapest, Hungary	43rd	Marathon	2:37:53
2023	Nagoya Women's Marathon	Nagoya, Japan	10th	Marathon	2:27:54
2023	World Cross Country Championships	Bathurst, New South Wales, Australia	29th	10km	36:17
2022	Melbourne Marathon	Melbourne, Australia	2nd	Marathon	2:28:10
2022	Commonwealth Games	Birmingham, England	8th	5000m	15:13.53
2022	Commonwealth Games	Birmingham, England	8th	10,000m	32:04.52
2021	Olympic Games	Tokyo, Japan	28th	5000m	15:21.65
2019	Summer Universiade	Naples, Italy	6th	10,000m	34:21.45
2017	Summer Universiade	Taipei, Taiwan	7th	10,000m	34:32.13

== Personal bests ==
- 3000 metres - 8:47.99 (Sydney 2024)
- 5000 metres – 14:49.75 (Liege 2024)
- 10,000 metres – 30:51.27 (Oslo 2025)

Road

- 5 kilometres – 15:25 (Ballarat 2025)
- 10 kilometres – 30:44 (Tokyo 2025)
- Half-marathon - 1:07.17 (Marugame 2025)
- Marathon – 2:20:38 (Chicago 2026)
- Parkrun – 15:25 (Adelaide 2022) World best
