= Sulka =

Sulka may mean:

- The Sulka language of Papua New Guinea
- Amos Sulka & Company, a defunct maker of men's wear.

== See also ==
- Sulca
