= Tanzania at the 2007 All-Africa Games =

- IOC code: TAN
- NOC: Tanzania Olympic Committee

in Algiers 11 July 2007 – 23 July 2007
- Medals: Gold 0 Silver 1 Bronze 0 Total 1

All-Africa Games appearances
- 1965; 1973; 1978; 1987; 1991; 1995; 1999; 2003; 2007; 2011; 2015; 2019; 2023

Tanzania competed in the 2007 All-Africa Games held at the Stade du 5 Juillet in the city of Algiers, Algeria.

== Medal summary ==
Tanzania won a single silver medal. Martin Sulle was second to Deriba Merga of Ethiopia in the half-marathon with a time of 1:03:01.

=== Medal table ===
Sport	Gold	Silver	Bronze	Total
Athletics	0	1	0	1
Total	0	1	0	1

== List of Medalists ==
Medal	Name	Sport	Event	Date	Ref
Silver	Martin Sulle	Athletics	Half marathon	20 July 2007	

== See also ==
- Tanzania at the African Games
