= 2023 World Athletics Cross Country Championships – Senior women's race =

Senior men's race at the 2023 World Athletics Cross Country Championships
- Organisers: World Athletics
- Edition: 44th
- Date: February 18, 2023
- Host city: Bathurst, New South Wales, Australia
- Events: 1
- Distances: 10 km – Senior women
- Participation: 90 athletes from 28 nations

The Senior women's race at the 2023 World Athletics Cross Country Championships was held at the Bathurst in Australia, on February 18, 2023. Beatrice Chebet from Kenya won the gold medal by 8 seconds over Ethiopian Tsigie Gebreselama, while Agnes Jebet Ngetich finished third.

== Race results ==
=== Senior women's race (10 km) ===
==== Individual ====
| Rank | Athlete | Country | Time |
|---|---|---|---|
| 1st place, gold medalist(s) | Beatrice Chebet | Kenya | 33:48 |
| 2nd place, silver medalist(s) | Tsigie Gebreselama | Ethiopia | 33:56 |
| 3rd place, bronze medalist(s) | Agnes Jebet Ngetich | Kenya | 34:00 |
| 4 | Grace Loibach Nawowuna | Kenya | 34:13 |
| 5 | Fotyen Tesfay | Ethiopia | 34:30 |
| 6 | Hawi Feysa | Ethiopia | 34:36 |
| 7 | Prisca Chesang | Uganda | 34:42 |
| 8 | Edinah Jebitok | Kenya | 34:45 |
| 9 | Emily Chebet | Kenya | 34:49 |
| 10 | Stella Chesang | Uganda | 34:58 |
| 11 | Doreen Chesang | Uganda | 35:01 |
| 12 | Gete Alemayehu | Ethiopia | 35:04 |
| 13 | Annet Chemengich Chelangat | Uganda | 35:08 |
| 14 | Nozomi Tanaka | Japan | 35:08 |
| 15 | Wede Kefale | Ethiopia | 35:14 |
| 16 | Rispa Cherop | Uganda | 35:30 |
| 17 | Dolshi Tesfu | Eritrea | 35:32 |
| 18 | Ednah Kurgat | United States | 35:36 |
| 19 | Ellie Pashley | Australia | 35:38 |
| 20 | Parul Chaudhary | India | 35:39 |
| 21 | Weini Kelati Frezghi | United States | 35:48 |
| 22 | Leanne Pompeani | Australia | 35:49 |
| 23 | Rose Davies | Australia | 35:52 |
| 24 | Abbie Donnelly | United Kingdom | 35:53 |
| 25 | Amelia Quirk | United Kingdom | 35:56 |
| 26 | Laura Galván | Mexico | 36:01 |
| 27 | Cian Oldknow | South Africa | 36:02 |
| 28 | Caitlin Adams | Australia | 36:03 |
| 29 | Isobel Batt-Doyle | Australia | 36:17 |
| 30 | Irene Sánchez-Escribano | Spain | 36:20 |
| 31 | Katie Izzo | United States | 36:25 |
| 32 | Mercyline Chelangat | Uganda | 36:30 |
| 33 | Allie Buchalski | United States | 36:37 |
| 34 | Regan Yee | Canada | 36:43 |
| 35 | Natalia Allen | Canada | 36:43 |
| 36 | Poppy Tank | United Kingdom | 36:47 |
| 37 | Kyla Jacobs | South Africa | 36:49 |
| 38 | Aynslee Van Graan | South Africa | 36:59 |
| 39 | Laura Luengo | Spain | 36:59 |
| 40 | Julie-Anne Staehli | Canada | 37:03 |
| 41 | Cristina Ruiz | Spain | 37:04 |
| 42 | Glenrose Xaba | South Africa | 37:08 |
| 43 | Katelyn Ayers | Canada | 37:09 |
| 44 | Georgia Hansen | Australia | 37:15 |
| 45 | Naima Ait Alibou | Spain | 37:17 |
| 46 | Maria Bernard-Galea | Canada | 37:23 |
| 47 | Sanjivani Jadhav | India | 37:30 |
| 48 | Kesa Molotsane | South Africa | 37:37 |
| 49 | Sarah Drought | New Zealand | 37:53 |
| 50 | Carolina Robles | Spain | 38:10 |
| 51 | Kate Bazeley | Canada | 38:20 |
| 52 | Megan Keith | United Kingdom | 38:32 |
| 53 | Reimi Yoshimura | Japan | 38:34 |
| 54 | Emily Roughan | New Zealand | 38:57 |
| 55 | Chhavi Yadav | India | 39:00 |
| 56 | Emily Lipari | United States | 39:06 |
| 57 | Rahel Daniel | Eritrea | 39:22 |
| 58 | Farhat Bano | Pakistan | 39:23 |
| 59 | Cacisile Sosibo | South Africa | 39:25 |
| 60 | Laura Maasik | Estonia | 39:33 |
| 61 | Hannah Miller | New Zealand | 39:45 |
| 62 | Momoka Kawaguchi | Japan | 39:50 |
| 63 | Zhou Xia | China | 39:50 |
| 64 | Lisa Cross | New Zealand | 40:02 |
| 65 | Olivia Chitate | Zimbabwe | 40:06 |
| 66 | Mary Tenge | Papua New Guinea | 40:30 |
| 67 | Kerry White | Australia | 40:54 |
| 68 | Yao Miao | China | 41:20 |
| 69 | Katherine Camp | New Zealand | 41:45 |
| 70 | Li Yingcui | China | 41:48 |
| 71 | Laura Cusaria | Colombia | 42:08 |
| 72 | Ongan Awa | Papua New Guinea | 42:30 |
| 73 | Dianah Matekali | Solomon Islands | 42:51 |
| 74 | Joan Makary | Lebanon | 43:12 |
| 75 | Jennifer Tomazou | Lebanon | 43:35 |
| 76 | María Pía Fernández | Uruguay | 43:53 |
| 77 | Scholastica Herman | Papua New Guinea | 44:02 |
| 78 | Sharon Firisua | Solomon Islands | 44:06 |
| 79 | Lauriane Bisch | French Polynesia | 44:08 |
| 80 | Ramata Abdulai | Ghana | 44:23 |
| 81 | Vanessa Lee Ying Zhuang | Singapore | 44:41 |
| 82 | Nathania Tan | Northern Mariana Islands | 44:51 |
| 83 | Nesrine Njeim | Lebanon | 45:17 |
| 84 | Tiana Abdulmassih | Lebanon | 45:27 |
| | Ririka Hironaka | Japan | DNS |
| | Mary Kua | Papua New Guinea | DNS |
| | Cintia Chepngeno | Kenya | DNF |
| | Betty Teuei | Kiribati | DNF |
| | Aina Goir | Papua New Guinea | DNF |
| | Letesenbet Gidey | Ethiopia | DQ |

==== Team ====
| Rank | Team | Score |
|---|---|---|
| 1st place, gold medalist(s) | Kenya | 16 |
| 2nd place, silver medalist(s) | Ethiopia | 25 |
| 3rd place, bronze medalist(s) | Uganda | 41 |
| 4 | Australia | 92 |
| 5 | United States | 103 |
| 6 | United Kingdom | 137 |
| 7 | South Africa | 144 |
| 8 | Canada | 152 |
| 9 | Spain | 155 |
| 10 | New Zealand | 228 |
| 11 | Lebanon | 316 |
