= Emily Hosker-Thornhill =

British long-distance runner

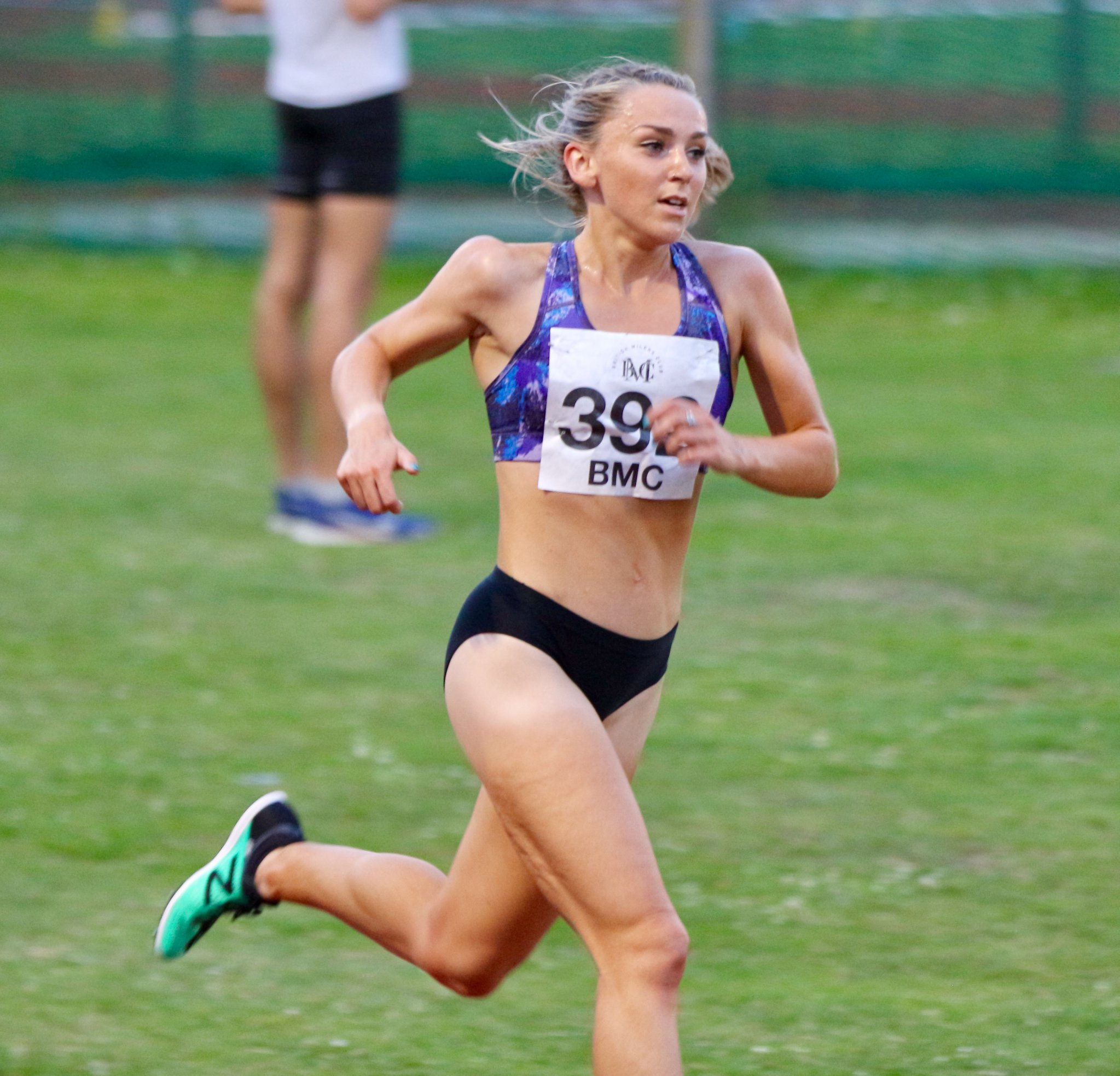
- Emily Hosker-Thornhill in 2013

Personal information
- Born: 27 October 1992 (age 32)

Sport
- Country: United Kingdom
- Event: Long-distance running

Emily Hosker-Thornhill (born 27 October 1992) is a British long-distance runner.

In 2017, she competed in the senior women's race at the 2017 IAAF World Cross Country Championships held in Kampala, Uganda. She finished in 89th place.

In 2019, she competed in the senior women's race at the 2019 IAAF World Cross Country Championships held in Aarhus, Denmark. She finished in 48th place.
