= Mema Tiango =

Botswana long-distance runner

Personal information
- Born: 29 October 1991 (age 33)

Sport
- Country: Botswana
- Sport: Long-distance running

Mema Tiango (born 29 October 1991) is long-distance runner from Botswana. She competed in the senior women's race at the 2019 IAAF World Cross Country Championships held in Aarhus, Denmark. She finished in 109th place.

In 2017, she competed in the senior women's race at the 2017 IAAF World Cross Country Championships held in Kampala, Uganda. She finished in 92nd place.
