= 2015 World Mountain Running Championships =

- Organisers: WMRA
- Edition: 31st
- Date: 19 September
- Host city: Betws-y-Coed, United Kingdom
- Events: 6

The 2015 World Mountain Running Championships was the 31st edition of the global mountain running competition, World Mountain Running Championships, organised by the World Mountain Running Association and was held in Betws-y-Coed, United Kingdom on 19 September 2015.

== Results ==
=== Men ===
Distance 13 km, difference in height 720 m, participants 119.

Rank	Athlete	Country	Time
1st place, gold medalist(s)	Fred Musobo	Uganda	49:00
2nd place, silver medalist(s)	Bernard Dematteis	Italy	49:44
(bronze) .	Robbie Simpson	United Kingdom	50:31
4.	Martin Dematteis	Italy	50:41
5.	Joseph Gray	United States	51:16
6.	Andrew Douglas	United Kingdom	51:18
7.	Xavier Chevrier	Italy	51:36
8.	Jushua Mangusho	Uganda	1:00:36
9.	Robert Chemonges	Uganda	51:46
10.	Chris Smith	United Kingdom	51:49
11.	Jan Janu	Czech Republic	52:03
12.	Alex Baldaccini	Italy	52:09
13.	Andy Wacker	United States	52:25
14.	John Jairo Vargas	Colombia	52:33
15.	Juan Carlos Carera	Mexico	52:40
16.	Luca Cagnati	Italy	52:56
17.	Said Diaz	Mexico	53:08
18.	Alessandro Rambaldini	Italy	53:12
19.	Fabien Demure	France	53:14
20.	Isaac Kiprop	Uganda	53:26

=== Men team ===
Rank	Country	Athletes	Time
1st place, gold medalist(s)	Italy	Bernard Dematteis, Martin Dematteis, Xavier Chevrier, Alex Baldaccini	2+4+7+12=25
2nd place, silver medalist(s)	Uganda	Fred Musobo, Jushua Mangusho, Robert Chemonges, Isaac Kiprop	1+8+9+20=38
3rd place, bronze medalist(s)	United Kingdom	Robbie Simpson, Andrew Douglas, Chris Smith, Thomas Adams	3+6+10+27=46
4.	United States	Joseph Gray, Andy Wacker, Ryan Bak, John Patrick Donovan	5+13+22+37=77

=== Women ===
Distance 8.9 km, difference in height 480 m, participants 68.

Rank	Athlete	Country	Time
1st place, gold medalist(s)	Stella Chesang	Uganda	37:52
2nd place, silver medalist(s)	Emily Collinge	United Kingdom	38:23
3rd place, bronze medalist(s)	Emma Clayton	United Kingdom	38:33
4.	Sarah Tunstall	United Kingdom	39:06
5.	Alice Gaggi	Italy	39:13
6.	Kimber Mattox	United States	39:31
7.	Pavla Schorna-Matyasova	Czech Republic	39:40
8.	Sabine Reiner	Austria	39:44
9.	Sarah McCormack	Ireland	40:02
10.	Morgan Arritola	United States	40:11
11.	Kasie Enman	United States	40:11
12.	Samantha Galassi	Italy	40:15
13.	Mercyline Chelangat	Uganda	40:18
14.	Doreen Chemutai	Uganda	40:19
15.	Victoria Wilkinson	United Kingdom	40:34
16.	Ivana Lozzia	Italy	40:37
17.	Sara Bottarelli	Italy	40:43
18.	Allison Grace Morgan	United States	41:00
19.	Anais Sabrie	France	41:04
20.	Denisa Ionela Dragomuir	Romania	41:18

=== Women team ===
Rank	Country	Athletes	Time
1st place, gold medalist(s)	United Kingdom	Emily Collinge, Emma Clayton, Sarah Tunstall	2+3+4=9
2nd place, silver medalist(s)	United States	Kimber Mattox, Morgan Arritola, Kasie Enman	6+10+11=27
3rd place, bronze medalist(s)	Uganda	Stella Chesang, Mercyline Chelangat, Doreen Chemutai	1+13+13=28
4.	Italy	Alice Gaggi, Samantha Galassi, Ivana Lozzia	5+12+16=33

=== Junior Men ===
Distance 8.9 km, difference in height 480 m, participants 63.

Rank	Athlete	Country	Time
1st place, gold medalist(s)	Ferhat Bozkurt	Turkey	33:56
2nd place, silver medalist(s)	Levi Thomet	United States	35:50
3rd place, bronze medalist(s)	Mustafa Göksel	Turkey	35:53
4.	Davie Magnini	Italy	36:03
5.	Abdullah Yorulmaz	Turkey	36:12
6.	Max Nicholls	United Kingdom	36:23
7.	Alberto Vender	Italy	36:39
8.	Jacob Adkin	United Kingdom	36:42
9.	Ben Butler	United States	36:49
10.	Mathieu Jacquet	France	36:52
11.	Mateusz Ciełak	Poland	36:57
12.	Jack Beaumont	New Zealand	37:04
13.	Pavel Hladík	Czech Republic	37:11
14.	Vadim Sukhonenko	Russia	37:11
15.	Sebastian Vosvrda	Czech Republic	37:12
16.	John Spill	United Kingdom	37:36
17.	Jose Alfredo Dominguez	Mexico	37:46
18.	Tayte Pollmann	United States	37:46
19.	Maximilien Drion	Belgium	37:57
20.	Nathan Jovet	France	38:10

=== Junior Men team ===
Rank	Country	Athletes	Time
1st place, gold medalist(s)	Turkey	Ferhat Bozkurt; Mustafa Göksel; Abdullah Yorulmaz; Kemal Yıldırım	1+3+5 = 9
2nd place, silver medalist(s)	United States	Levi Thomet; Ben Butler; Tayte Pollmann; Condor Wilson	2+9+18 = 29
3rd place, bronze medalist(s)	United Kingdom	Max Nicholls; Jacob Adkin; John Spill; Jacob Boyle	6+8+16 = 30
4.	Italy	Davie Magnini; Alberto Vender; Luca Catoni; Luca Ventura	4+7+21 = 32

=== Junior Women ===
Distance 4.7 km, difference in height 240 m, participants 43.

Rank	Athlete	Country	Time
1st place, gold medalist(s)	Allie Ostrander	United States	19:44
2nd place, silver medalist(s)	Michaela Stránská	Czech Republic	20:23
3rd place, bronze medalist(s)	Elsa Racasan	France	20:31
4.	Tereza Korvasová	Czech Republic	20:44
5.	Heidi Davies	United Kingdom	20:55
6.	Roberta Ciappini	Italy	21:04
7.	Magdalena Dias	Poland	21:04
8.	Georgia Malir	United Kingdom	21:06
9.	Gulistan Bekmez	Turkey	21:12
10.	Dilyana Minkina	Bulgaria	21:12
11.	Burcu Subatan	Turkey	21:19
12.	Julia Praxmarer	Austria	21:23
13.	Annika Seefeld	Germany	21:28
14.	Giulia Zanne	Italy	21:30
15.	Lucja Wiktorowicz	Poland	21:30
16.	Joanna Hills	Australia	21:36
17.	Salome Baudoin	France	21:42
18.	Andrea Piscu	Romania	21:42
19.	Vrena Streitberger	Austria	21:46
20.	Polina Tarakanova	Russia	21:49

=== Junior Women Team ===
Rank	Country	Athletes	Time
1st place, gold medalist(s)	Czech Republic	Michaela Stránská; Tereza Korvasová; Katerina Divišová	2+4 = 6
2nd place, silver medalist(s)	United Kingdom	Heidi Davies; Georgia Malir; Scarlet Dale	5+8 = 13
3rd place, bronze medalist(s)	Turkey	Gulistan Bekmez; Burcu Subatan; Fatma Demir	9+11 = 20
4.	Italy	Roberta Ciappini; Giulia Zanne; Alessia Zecca	6+14 = 20
