= Maria Chiara Cascavilla =

Italian long-distance runner

Personal information
- Born: 26 April 1995 (age 30)

Sport
- Country: Italy
- Sport: Long-distance running

Maria Chiara Cascavilla (born 26 April 1995) is an Italian long-distance runner. She competed in the women's half marathon at the 2020 World Athletics Half Marathon Championships held in Gdynia, Poland.

In 2019, she competed in the women's 5000 metres at the Summer Universiade held in Naples, Italy. She finished in 6th place in the final.
