= 2019 IAAF World Cross Country Championships – Senior women's race =

2019 Senior women's race
- Organisers: IAAF
- Edition: 43rd
- Date: March 30
- Host city: Aarhus, Denmark
- Events: 1
- Distances: 10 km – Senior women (9.858 km)
- Participation: 121 athletes from 49 nations

The Senior women's race at the 2019 IAAF World Cross Country Championships was held at the Aarhus in Denmark, on March 30, 2019. Hellen Obiri from Kenya won the gold medal by two seconds over Ethiopians Dera Dida and Letesenbet Gidey.

== Race results ==
=== Senior women's race (10 km) ===
==== Individual ====
Rank	Athlete	Country	Time
1st place, gold medalist(s)	Hellen Obiri	Kenya	36:14
2nd place, silver medalist(s)	Dera Dida	Ethiopia	36:16
3rd place, bronze medalist(s)	Letesenbet Gidey	Ethiopia	36:24
4	Rachael Zena Chebet	Uganda	36:47
5	Peruth Chemutai	Uganda	36:49
6	Tsehay Gemechu	Ethiopia	36:56
7	Beatrice Chepkoech	Kenya	37:12
8	Eva Cherono	Kenya	37:13
9	Deborah Samum	Kenya	37:18
10	Zenebu Fikadu	Ethiopia	37:24
11	Fotyen Tesfay	Ethiopia	37:29
12	Lilian Kasait Rengeruk	Kenya	37:35
13	Juliet Chekwel	Uganda	37:35
14	Esther Chebet	Uganda	37:36
15	Anna Emilie Møller	Denmark	37:51
16	Failuna Matanga	Tanzania	37:56
17	Hawi Feysa	Ethiopia	37:59
18	Fionnuala McCormack	Ireland	37:59
19	Shitaye Eshete	Bahrain	38:08
20	Geneviève Lalonde	Canada	38:10
21	Stella Chesang	Uganda	38:14
22	Liv Westphal	France	38:18
23	Elena Burkard	Germany	38:26
24	Darya Mykhaylova	Ukraine	38:41
25	Irene Sánchez-Escribano	Spain	38:44
26	Melissa Duncan	Australia	38:47
27	Nazret Weldu	Eritrea	38:51
28	Desi Jisa Mokonin	Bahrain	38:51
29	Paige Campbell	Australia	38:52
30	Kate Avery	Great Britain	38:55
31	Beatrice Chepkemoi Mutai	Kenya	38:59
32	Mhairi Carmen Maclennan	Great Britain	39:05
33	Stephanie Bruce	United States	39:09
34	Jennifer Nesbitt	Great Britain	39:12
35	Emily Brichacek	Australia	39:18
36	Jess Piasecki	Great Britain	39:20
37	Cavaline Nahimana	Burundi	39:21
38	Dolshi Tesfu	Eritrea	39:24
39	Nozomi Tanaka	Japan	39:27
40	Gladys Tejeda	Peru	39:27
41	Rose Chelimo	Bahrain	39:27
42	Kesaoleboga Molotsane	South Africa	39:31
43	Natasha Wodak	Canada	39:42
44	Marnie Ponton	Australia	39:43
45	Leanne Pompeani	Australia	39:46
46	Rika Kaseda	Japan	39:48
47	Yukina Ueda	Japan	39:48
48	Emily Hosker-Thornhill	Great Britain	39:50
49	Magdalena Shauri	Tanzania	39:52
50	Sarah Pagano	United States	39:54
51	Anne-Marie Blaney	United States	39:55
52	Lavinia Haitope	Namibia	39:55
53	Maja Alm	Denmark	39:56
54	Floriane Chevalier Garenne	France	39:57
55	Elvanie Nimbona	Burundi	40:00
56	Karissa Schweizer	United States	40:04
57	Katelyn Ayers	Canada	40:05
58	Marielle Hall	United States	40:12
59	Blanca Fernández	Spain	40:14
60	Mathilde Sénéchal	France	40:15
61	Gema Martín	Spain	40:18
62	Marie Bouchard	France	40:19
63	Doreen Chesang	Uganda	40:26
64	Bontu Edao Rebitu	Bahrain	40:26
65	Azucena Díaz	Spain	40:27
66	Claire Sumner	Canada	40:33
67	Glenrose Xaba	South Africa	40:41
68	Natalia Elisante Sulle	Tanzania	40:41
69	Caitlin Adams	Australia	40:42
70	Moira Stewartová	Czech Republic	40:43
71	Nélida Sulca	Peru	40:44
72	Jessica O'Connell	Canada	40:45
73	Sara Louise Treacy	Ireland	40:50
74	Francine Niyomukunzi	Burundi	40:51
75	Courtney Frerichs	United States	40:59
76	Zhang Deshun	China	41:02
77	Yuanfeng Li	China	41:07
78	Angelina Tsere	Tanzania	41:36
79	Amelia Quirk	Great Britain	41:40
80	Alberte Kjær Pedersen	Denmark	41:50
81	Simone Christensen Glad	Denmark	42:02
82	Rina Cjuro	Peru	42:11
83	Emily Roughan	New Zealand	42:12
84	Line Brandt Pedersen	Denmark	42:17
85	Inés Melchor	Peru	42:20
86	Natalia Hawthorn	Canada	42:23
87	Yuyu Xia	China	42:26
88	Felistus Chitoshi	Zambia	42:33
89	Aynslee Van Graan	South Africa	42:33
90	. Cintha	India	42:50
91	Amna Bakhit	Switzerland	42:54
92	Hayley Green	New Zealand	42:59
93	Belén Casetta	Argentina	43:10
94	Mayada Al Sayad	Palestine	43:24
95	Yui Yabuta	Japan	43:25
96	Xinyan Zhang	China	43:40
97	Maria Ahm	Denmark	43:43
98	Rochelle Sceats-Basil	New Zealand	43:57
99	Amina Mohamed Mgoo	Tanzania	43:58
100	María Pía Fernández	Uruguay	44:21
101	Rudo Mhonderwa	Zimbabwe	44:47
102	Xiaoqian Zhong	China	45:01
103	Margarita Masías	Chile	45:14
104	Lisa Marie Bezzina	Malta	45:53
105	Agata Strausa	Latvia	46:32
106	Idelma Lizeth Delgado	El Salvador	46:34
107	Mosadikwena M. Gotswakgosi	Botswana	46:47
108	Zeinab Bazzi	Lebanon	48:28
109	Mema Tiango	Botswana	48:30
110	Nesma Ammar Saad Mohamed Abdelghany	Egypt	48:40
111	Joan Makary	Lebanon	48:41
112	Liz Weiler	Luxembourg	49:29
113	Loaa Zaarour	Lebanon	52:39
114	Laura Fallaha	Lebanon	54:16
115	Randa Jaafar	Lebanon	55:06
-	Trihas Gebre	Spain	DNF
-	Dominique Scott	South Africa	DNF
-	Winfred Mutile Yavi	Bahrain	DNF
-	Fanus Alem	Eritrea	DNS
-	Kisanet Marikos	Eritrea	DNS
-	Harena Tadese	Eritrea	DNS
