= Tanzania at the 2019 African Games =

- Flag of Tanzania
- IOC code: TAN
- NOC: Tanzania Olympic Committee

in Rabat, Morocco 19 August 2019 – 31 August 2019
- Competitors: 10 (7 men and 3 women) in 2 sports
- Medals: Gold 0 Silver 0 Bronze 0 Total 0

African Games appearances (overview)
- 1965; 1973; 1978; 1987; 1991; 1995; 1999; 2003; 2007; 2011; 2015; 2019; 2023

Tanzania competed at the 2019 African Games held from 19 to 31 August 2019 in Rabat, Morocco. Athletes representing Tanzania competed in two sports, athletics and judo, and did not win any medals.

== Athletics ==
Tanzania competed in several events in athletics.

Ali Khamis Gulam and Benjamini Michael Kulwa competed in the men's 200 metres and men's 400 metres events.

Regina Deogratius Mpigachai competed in the women's 800 metres event. She competed in the heats and did not advance to compete in the final.

Gabriel Gerald Geay competed in the men's 1500 metres. He was also scheduled to compete in the men's 5000 metres event but he did not start.

Natalia Elisante Sulle and Sara Ramadhani competed in the women's half marathon event. Sulle finished in 7th place and Ramadhani did not finish.

== Judo ==
Three athletes represented Tanzania in judo:

Athlete	Event	Round of 32	Round of 16	Quarterfinals	Semifinals	Repechage 1	Final / BM	
Athlete	Event	Opposition Result	Opposition Result	Opposition Result	Opposition Result	Opposition Result	Opposition Result	Rank
Abdulrabi Alawi Abdulla	Men's -66 kg	Andriamanoelina (MAD); L	did not advance					
Anangisye Phring Pwele	Men's -73 kg	Siquir (MOZ); L	did not advance					
Khamis Hussein Ali	Men's -81 kg	Ahmed (SUD); L	did not advance					
