= Sintayehu Lewetegn =

Ethiopian long-distance runner

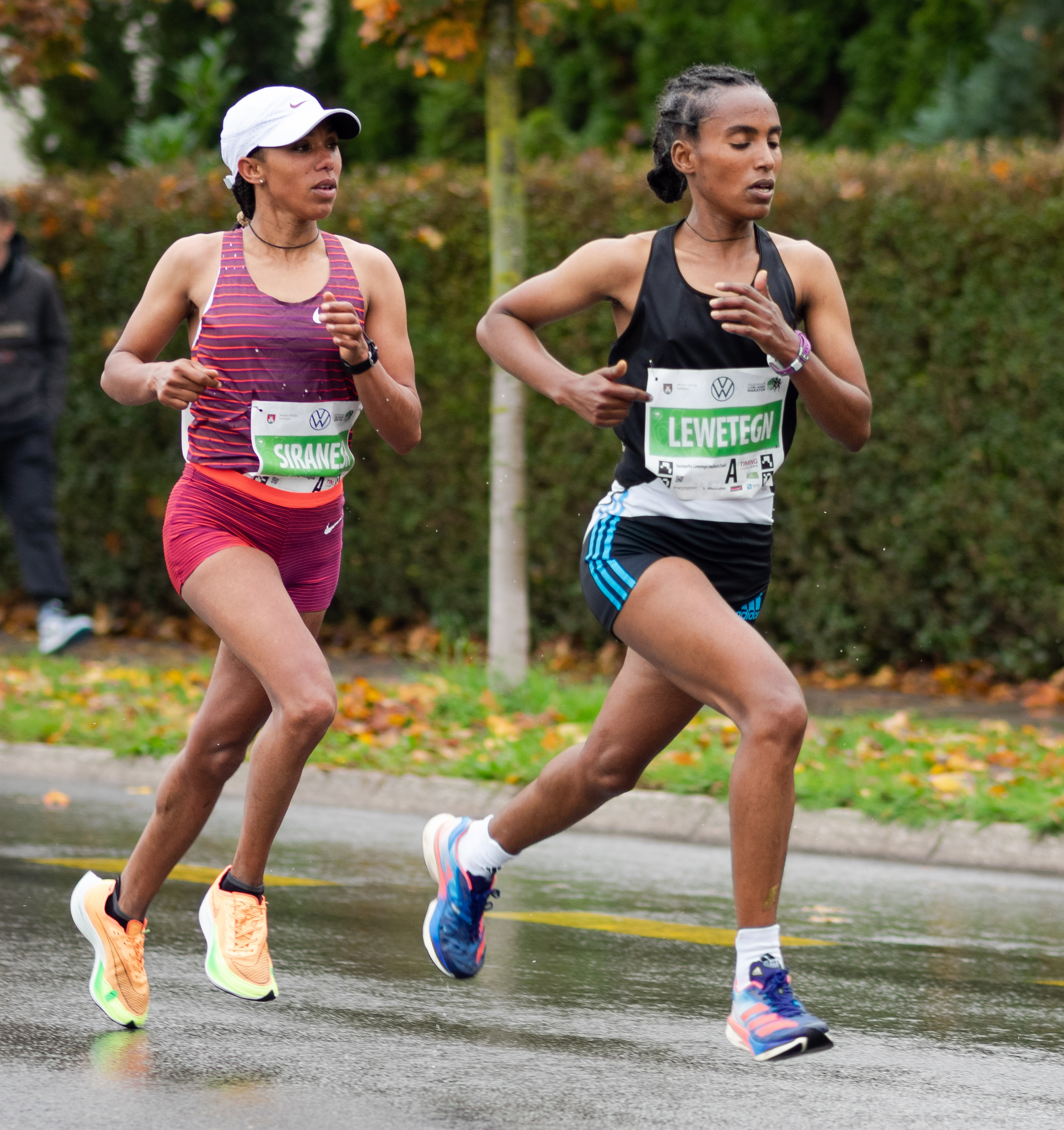
- Lewetegn and Siranesh Yirga at the 2022 Ljubljana Marathon

Personal information
- Full name: Sintayehu Lewetegn Hailemichael
- Nationality: Ethiopian
- Born: May 9, 1996 (age 30)
- Height: 161 cm (5 ft 3 1/2 in)
- Weight: 48 kg (106 lb)

Sport
- Sport: Athletics
- Event(s): Marathon, 5000 metres

Achievements and titles
- Personal bests: 5000m: 14:53.44 (2017); Marathon: 2:22:36 (2022)
Medal record
Women's athletics
Representing Ethiopia
World Cross Country Championships
Silver medal – second place	2017 Kampala	Senior team
African U20 Championships
Silver medal – second place	2015 Addis Abeba	5000 m

Sintayehu Lewetegn Hailemichael (also spelled Sentayehu Lewetegn or Sintayehu Lewetegne; born 9 May 1996) is an Ethiopian long-distance runner. She was a part of the silver medal-winning Ethiopian team at the 2017 World Cross Country Championships, finishing 14th individually.

== Biography ==
In 2015, Lewetegn made her international track debut at the 2015 African Junior Championships in Athletics, where she competed in the women's 5000 metres. Her compatriot Etagegne Woldu broke away from the field after six laps, and Lewetegn outkicked the chase pack on the final lap to finish second and win a silver medal.

Lewetegn's Diamond League debut was at the 2016 Rabat Diamond League, where she finished 8th in the 5000 metres in a personal best time of 15:06. The following year, she finished 7th at the Shanghai Diamond League, after which she transitioned to the marathon.

In 2017, Lewetegn was a scorer for the Ethiopian team at the 2017 World Cross Country Championships. She finished 14th overall and was the fourth Ethiopian finisher, contributing to her team's silver medal finish behind the dominant Kenyan team.

== Statistics ==
=== Personal bests ===
Event	Mark	Competition	Venue	Date
5000 metres	14:53.44	Guldensporenmeeting	Kortrijk, Belgium	8 July 2017
Marathon	2:22:36	Ljubljana Marathon	Ljubljana, Slovenia	23 October 2022
