= Emily Collinge =

British runner (born 1988)

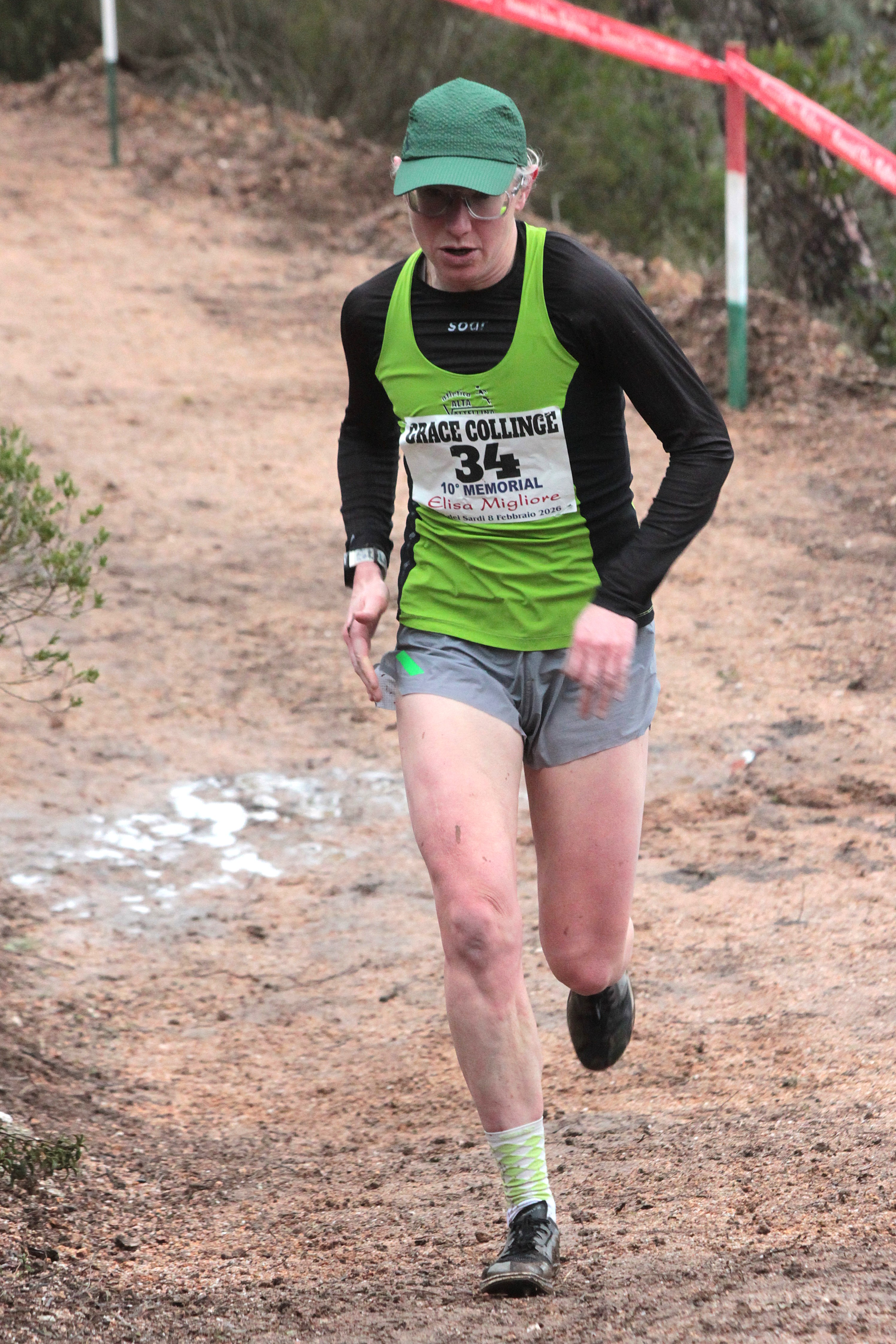
Collinge in a country cross race in Italy

Emily Grace Collinge (born 27 February 1988) is a British runner who has won the European Mountain Running Championships and finished second in the World Mountain Running Championships.

Collinge represented England as a junior in cross country. After a period of reduced participation in the sport whilst at university, she began running more again whilst living in northern Sweden and exploring the wild landscape on foot.

She took part in the Drei Zinnen Alpine Run in 2013, finishing third. She continued to race on various surfaces, her wins in 2014 including the Clowne Half Marathon on the roads and the Red Bull Steeplechase over 21 miles of hilly trails.

In 2015, Collinge won the individual silver medal at the World Mountain Running Championships which were held in Betws-y-Coed in the UK. She also won a team gold along with Emma Clayton and Sarah Tunstall.

The next year, Collinge won the European Mountain Running Championships in Arco in Italy.

Uphill races have provided Collinge with many victories, including the Transvulcania Vertical Kilometer and the Snowdon Super Cup. In the latter, she made the fastest ever ascent of Snowdon by a woman with a time of 46:55.

In 2018, she finished in 7th place at the 2018 World Mountain Running Championships held in Andorra.
