= Trihas Gebre =

Spanish long-distance runner (born 1990)

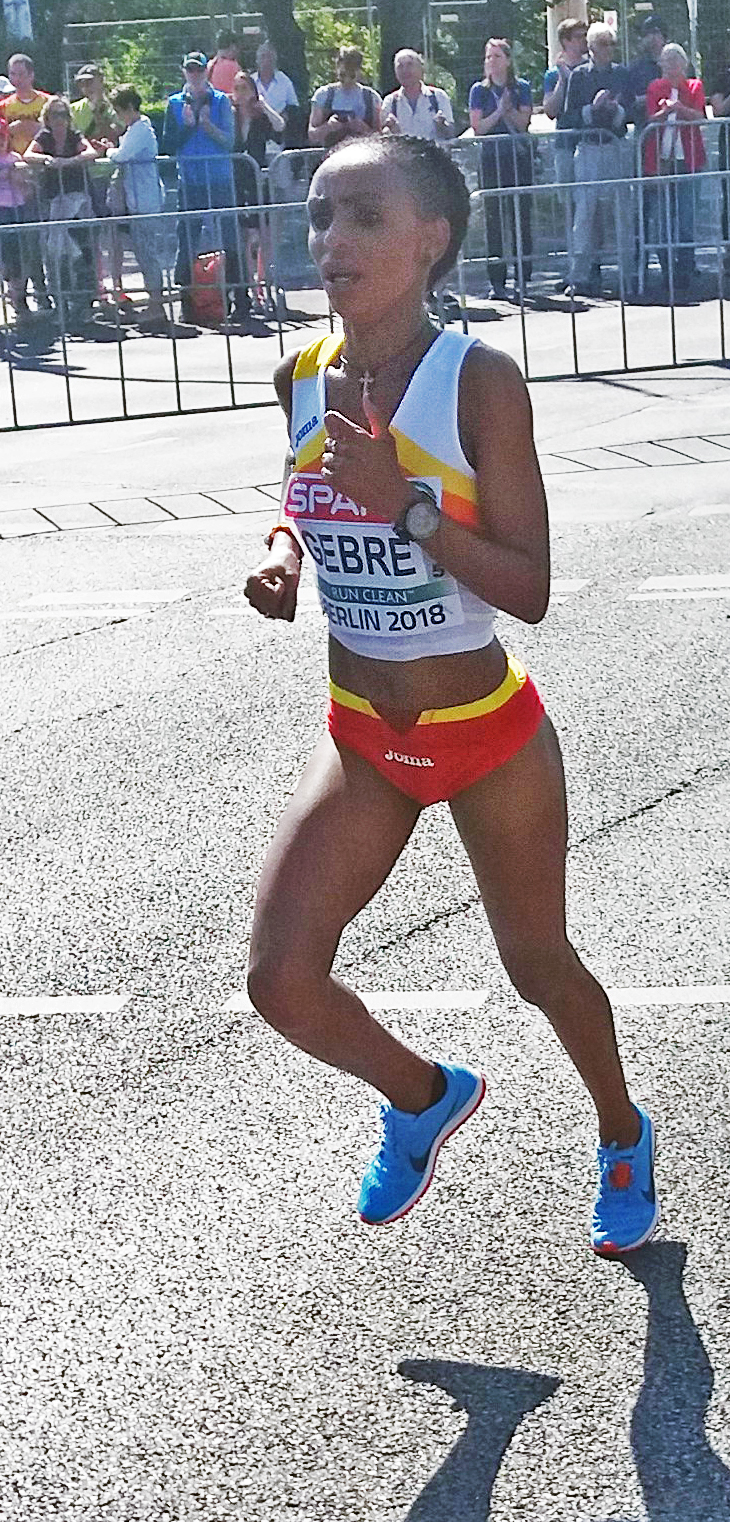
- Gebre in 2018

Personal information
- Full name: Trihas Gebre Aunoon
- Nationality: Spanish
- Born: 29 April 1990 (age 36) Wukro, Ethiopia
- Home town: San Sebastián, Spain
- Height: 1.62 m (5 ft 4 in)
- Weight: 49 kg (108 lb)

Sport
- Country: Spain
- Sport: Track and field
- Events: 10,000 metres, Marathon
- Club: Bilbao Atletismo
- Coached by: Ricardo Jiménez
Medal record
European Championships
Bronze medal – third place	2018 Berlin	Marathon Team

Trihas Gebre Aunoon (Note: In this Spanish name, the first or paternal surname is Gebre and the second or maternal family name is Aunoon.) (born 29 April 1990) is a long-distance runner. Born in Ethiopia, she competes for Spain internationally. She competed in the 10,000 metres at the 2015 World Championships in Beijing finishing 16th.

== International competitions ==
Year	Competition	Venue	Position	Event	Notes
Representing Ethiopia
2007	African Junior Championships	Ouagadougou, Burkina Faso	3rd	3000 m s'chase	10:17.30
Representing Spain
2014	European Cross Country Championships	Samokov, Bulgaria	13th	8 km	-
2015	World Cross Country Championships	Guiyang, China	15th	8 km	27:50
2015	World Championships	Beijing, China	16th	10,000 m	32:20.87
2015	European Cross Country Championships	Hyères, France	11th	8 km	-
2016	European Championships	Amsterdam, Netherlands	10th	10,000 m	32:20.45
2016	Olympic Games	Rio de Janeiro, Brazil	29th	10,000 m	32:09.67
2016	European Cross Country Championships	Chia, Italy	7th	8 km	25:41
2017	World Cross Country Championships	Kampala, Uganda	20th	10 km	34:37
2017	European Cross Country Championships	Šamorín, Slovakia	13th	8 km	27:53
2018	World Half Marathon Championships	Valencia, Spain	33rd	Half Marathon	1:12:16
2018	European Championships	Berlin, Germany	9th	Marathon	2:32:13
2019	World Cross Country Championships	Aarhus, Denmark	–	10 km cross	DNF

== Personal bests ==
Outdoor

- 5000 metres – 15:27.94 (Huelva 2015)
- 10,000 metres – 32:03.39 (Ostrava 2013)
- Half marathon – 1:09:51 NR (Olomouc 2018)
- Marathon – 2:32:13 (Berlin 2018)
- 3000 metres steeplechase – 10:13.73 (Bilbao 2008)
