= Yuka Suzuki =

Japanese long-distance runner

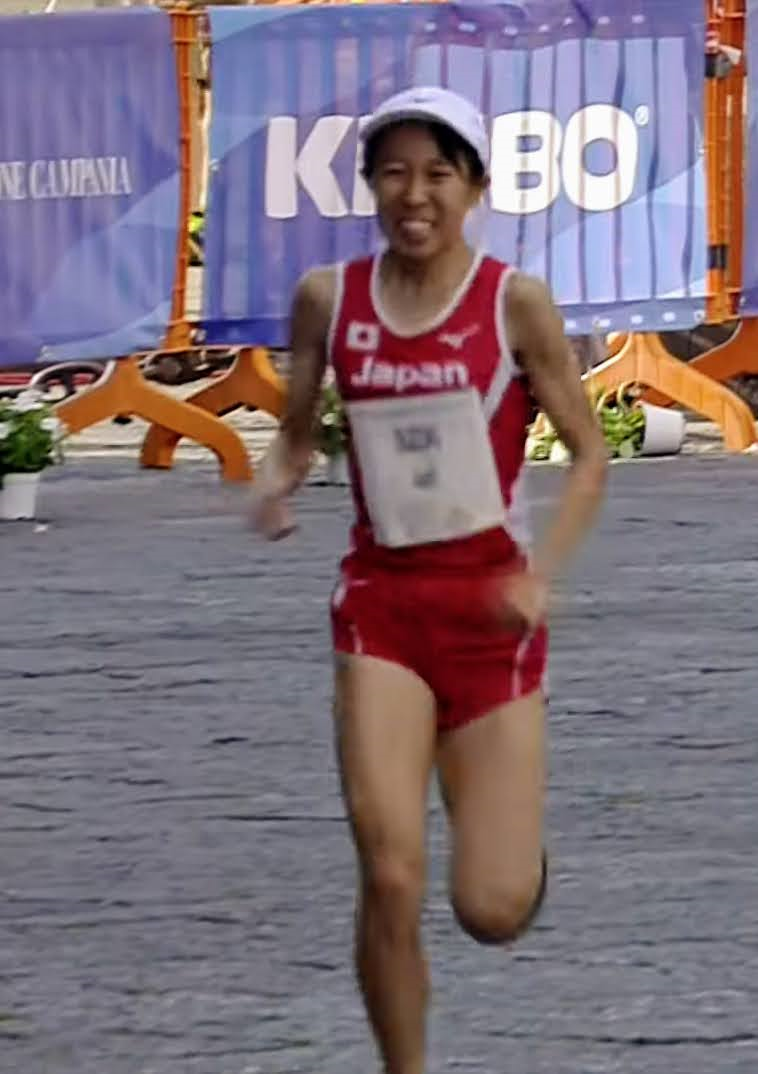
- Suzuki at 2019 Universiade in Naples, Italy

Personal information
- Native name: 鈴木優花
- Born: 14 September 1999 (age 26) Nakasen, Akita (Daisen, Akita)
- Education: Nakasen JHS; Omagari HS; Daito Bunka University
- Employer: Dai-ichi Life
- Height: 165 cm (5 ft 5 in)

Sport
- Country: Japan
- Sport: Long-distance running
- Event: 1500 metres – Marathon
- Coached by: Sachiko Yamashita

Achievements and titles
- Personal bests: 1500 m: 4:27.80; 3000 m: 9:18.60; 5000 m: 15:30.14; 10,000 m: 31:37.88; 10 km: Half marathon: 1:11:27; Marathon: 2:24:02 (2024 Paris)
Medal record
Women's long-distance running
Representing Japan
Summer Universiade
Gold medal – first place	2019 Naples	Half marathon
Gold medal – first place	2019 Naples	Half marathon team

Yuka Suzuki (鈴木 優花, Suzuki Yuka; born 14 September 1999 in Daisen, Akita) is a Japanese long-distance runner. In 2019, she won the gold medals in the women's half marathon at the Summer Universiade held in Naples, Italy. The youngest participant dominated the Marathon Grand Championship in October 2023, guaranteeing her selection for Olympic Games in Paris, in a personal best time of 2:24:09 which she then subsequently beat in 2024 Paris Olympics by 7 seconds despite the hilly course. She is good at running uphills.

== Biography ==
Suzuki was born in Nakasen, Akita Prefecture on September 14, 1999, the eldest daughter of educator Shigeki Suzuki and his wife Yasuko. At the age of three she completed a 3-kilometer run without stopping. Suzuki also played basketball as a teenager in her home prefecture of Akita which is famous for its Hoosier Hysteria-like state of basketball fanaticism. After graduating from Omagari High School, she entered Daito Bunka University and gradually became a standout runner. Suzuki was the marathon record holder for Japanese university students, with a time of 2:25:02 achieved on 13 March 2022 at the Nagoya Women's Marathon - her very first marathon.

== Achievements ==
Key: Personal best

Year	Competition	Venue	Position	Event	Notes
Representing Japan
2018	Inter-University Athletics	Hiratsuka, Japan	1st	5000m	15:46.84 (NGR)
2019	Matsue Ladies Half Marathon	Matsue, Japan	1st	Half marathon	1:11:27
2019	Universiade	Naples, Italy	1st	Half marathon	1:14:10
2019	Zevenheuvelenloop	Nijmegen, Netherlands	4th	15 km	48.48
2021	Inter-University Athletics	Kumagaya, Japan	1st	10000 m	32:04.58 (NGR)
2022	Nagoya Women's Marathon	Nagoya, Japan	5th	Marathon	2:25:02 (Japanese Collegiate Record)
2023	Nagoya Women's Marathon	Nagoya, Japan	6th	Marathon	2:25:46
2023	Marathon Grand Championship	Tokyo, Japan	1st	Marathon	2:24:09
2024	Olympic Games	Paris, France	6th	Marathon	2:24:02
