= Li Zhixuan =

Chinese long-distance runner

Personal information
- Born: 23 March 1994 (age 31)

Sport
- Country: China
- Sport: Long-distance running

Li Zhixuan (born 23 March 1994) is a Chinese long-distance runner. In 2015, she competed in the senior women's race at the 2015 IAAF World Cross Country Championships held in Guiyang, China. She finished in 75th place. In 2019, she finished in 5th place in the women's half marathon at the 2019 Summer Universiade held in Naples, Italy.

She competed in the women's marathon at the 2022 World Athletics Championships held in Eugene, Oregon, United States.

== Competition record ==
Year	Competition	Venue	Position	Event	Notes
Representing China
2015	World Cross Country Championships	Guiyang, China	75th	8000 m	31:36
2015	Asian Championships	Wuhan, China	5th	5000 m	16:07.05
2019	Universiade	Naples, Italy	5th	Half marathon	1:15:14
2021	Olympic Games	Sapporo, Japan	62nd	Marathon	2:45:23
2022	World Championships	Eugene, United States	22nd	Marathon	2:31:20
2023	World Championships	Budapest, Hungary	32nd	Marathon	2:35:48
2023	Asian Games	Hangzhou, China	4th	Marathon	2:30:02
2025	World Championships	Tokyo, Japan	22nd	Marathon	2:34:03
