= Doreen Chesang =

Ugandan long-distance runner

Personal information
- Born: 16 October 1990 (age 35)

Sport
- Country: Uganda
- Sport: Long-distance running
Medal record
Women's athletics
Representing Uganda
World Cross Country Championships
Bronze medal – third place	2023 Bathurst	Senior team

Doreen Chesang (born 16 October 1990) is a Ugandan long-distance runner. In 2018, she competed in the women's half marathon at the 2018 IAAF World Half Marathon Championships held in Valencia, Spain. She finished in 49th place.

== Career ==
In 2017, she competed in the senior women's race at the 2017 IAAF World Cross Country Championships held in Kampala, Uganda. She finished in 25th place.

In 2018, she won the bronze medal at the Commonwealth Half Marathon Championships held in Cardiff, Wales.

In 2019, she competed in the senior women's race at the 2019 IAAF World Cross Country Championships held in Aarhus, Denmark. She finished in 63rd place.

In 2020, she competed in the women's half marathon at the 2020 World Athletics Half Marathon Championships held in Gdynia, Poland.
