= Zhanna Mamazhanova =

Kazakhstani long-distance runner

Personal information
- Full name: Zhanna Kanatovna Mamazhanova
- Born: 26 January 1994 (age 32) Semey, Kazakhstan
- Height: 1.65 m (5 ft 5 in)

Sport
- Country: Kazakhstan
- Sport: Women's athletics

Zhanna Kanatovna Mamazhanova (Жанна Канатовна Мамажанова, born 26 January 1994) is a Kazakh long-distance runner. She competed at the IAAF World Half Marathon Championships in 2018. In May 2021, she ran a personal best in the marathon of 2:26:54, and subsequently qualified for the 2020 Summer Olympics and competed in the women's marathon event, finishing in 46th place.

Mamazhanova finished 11th in the women's marathon at the 2022 Asian Games and 33rd in the women's marathon at the 2024 Summer Olympics.

== International competitions ==
Year	Competition	Location	Position	Event	Notes
2018	IAAF World Half Marathon Championships	Valencia, Spain	106th	Half Marathon	1:22.35
2021	Olympic Games	Sapporo, Japan	46th	Marathon	2:37:42
2021	Marseille-Cassis Classique Internationale	Marseille, France	3rd	Half Marathon	1:16:28
2022	Asian Games	Hangzhou, China	11th	Marathon	2:38:59
2024	Olympic Games	Paris, France	33rd	Marathon	2:30:51
