= Athletics at the 2017 Summer Universiade – Women's 10,000 metres =

The women's 10,000 metres event at the 2017 Summer Universiade was held on 23 August at the Taipei Municipal Stadium.

== Results ==
Rank	Name	Nationality	Time	Notes
1st place, gold medalist(s)	Daria Maslova	Kyrgyzstan	33:19.27	
2nd place, silver medalist(s)	Sanjivani Jadhav	India	33:22.00	PB
3rd place, bronze medalist(s)	Ai Hosoda	Japan	33:27.89	
4	Yuki Munehisa	Japan	33:40.45	
5	Jennifer Nesbitt	Great Britain	34:01.34	
6	Andreea Alina Piscu	Romania	34:19.79	PB
7	Isobel Batt-Doyle	Australia	34:32.13	
8	Claire Sumner	Canada	34:41.24	
9	Emma Mitchell	Ireland	34:51.62	
10	Louise Small	Great Britain	35:03.93	
11	Irene van Lieshout	Netherlands	35:11.38	
12	Natsuki Sekiya	Japan	35:21.19	
13	Annet Chebet	Uganda	35:46.19	PB
	Sevilay Eytemiş	Turkey	DNF	
	Brenda Flores	Mexico	DNF	
	Büşra Koku	Turkey	DNF	
	Esma Aydemir	Turkey	DNS	
	Claudia Cornejo	Bolivia	DNS	
	Lina Pantoja	Colombia	DNS	
