= Zhang Deshun =

Chinese long-distance runner

Personal information
- Nationality: Chinese
- Born: 21 February 1996 (age 30)

Sport
- Sport: Athletics
- Event: Long-distance running

Zhang Deshun (Chinese: 张德顺; born 21 February 1996) is a Chinese long-distance runner. She qualified to represent China at the 2020 Summer Olympics in Tokyo 2021, competing in women's marathon.

== International competition ==
| Year | Competition | Venue | Position | Event | Notes |
Representing China
| 2015 | World Cross Country Championships(U20) | Guiyang, China | 25th | 6 km | 21:31 |
| 2015 | Yangzhou Half Marathon | Yangzhou, China | 13th | Half Marathon | 1:13:07 |
| 2016 | Yangzhou Half Marathon | Yangzhou, China | 7th | Half Marathon | 1:12:17 |
| 2018 | World Half Marathon Championships | Valencia, Spain | 22nd | Half Marathon | 1:11:28 |
| 2018 | Asian Games | Jakarta, Indonesia | 3rd | 10000 m | 32:12.78 |
| 2019 | World Cross Country Championships | Aarhus, Denmark | 76th | 10 km | 41:02 |
| 2019 | Asian Athletics Championships | Doha, Qatar | 6th | 10000 m | 34:09.63 |
| 2019 | Universiade | Naples, Italy | 1st | 10000 m | 34:03.31 |
| 2019 | Universiade | Naples, Italy | 10th | Half Marathon | 1:17:39 |
| 2020 | Macau Marathon | Macau, China | 1st | Marathon | 2:28:43 |
| 2021 | Olympic Games | Sapporo, Japan | 47th | Marathon | 2:37:45 |
| 2021 | Macau Marathon | Macau, China | 1st | Marathon | 2:29:09 |
| 2022 | World Championships | Eugene, Oregon, United States | 11th | Marathon | 2:28:11 |
| 2022 | Shanghai Marathon | Shanghai, China | 1st | Marathon | 2:28:17 |
| 2023 | Nagoya Women's Marathon | Nagoya, Japan | 4th | Marathon | 2:24:05 |
| 2023 | World Championships | Budapest, Hungary | 48th | Marathon | 2:40:17 |
| 2023 | Asian Games | Hangzhou, China | 2nd | Marathon | 2:27:55 |
| 2024 | Xiamen Marathon | Xiamen, China | 3rd | Marathon | 2:26:53 |
| 2024 | Meishan Renshou Half Marathon | Meishan, China | 1st | Half Marathon | 1:07:55 |
| 2024 | Wuxi Marathon | Wuxi, China | 6th | Marathon | 2:17:12 |
| 2024 | Diamond League Shanghai | Suzhou, China | 20th | 5000 m | 15:41.34 |
| 2024 | Olympic Games | Paris, France | 59th | Marathon | 2:36:47 |
| 2025 | World Championships | Tokyo, Japan | 30th | Marathon | 2:35:58 |
