= Sulca =

Sulca is a hispanized Quechua surname common in Peru. The surname means "little brother".

- Débora Sulca (born 1986), Peruvian model
- Nélida Sulca (born 1987), Peruvian athlete
- Wendy Sulca (born 1996), Peruvian singer
