= Athletics at the 2019 Summer Universiade – Women's 5000 metres =

The women's 5000 metres event at the 2019 Summer Universiade was held on 10 and 12 July at the Stadio San Paolo in Naples.

== Medalists ==
Gold	Silver	Bronze
Jessica Judd; Great Britain	Nicole Hutchinson; Canada	Julia van Velthoven; Netherlands

== Results ==
=== Heats ===
Qualification: First 5 in each heat (Q) and next 5 fastest (q) qualified for the final.

Rank	Heat	Name	Nationality	Time	Notes
1	1	Tomomi Musembi Takamatsu	Japan	16:19.61	Q
2	1	Maria Chiara Cascavilla	Italy	16:20.05	Q, PB
3	1	Caitlin Adams	Australia	16:24.23	Q
4	1	Julia van Velthoven	Netherlands	16:24.81	Q
5	1	Jessica Judd	Great Britain	16:27.46	Q
6	2	Katarzyna Jankowska	Poland	16:30.67	Q
7	2	Achash Kinetibeb	Ethiopia	16:31.61	Q
8	2	Yuna Wada	Japan	16:33.86	Q
9	2	Nicole Hutchinson	Canada	16:34.38	Q
10	2	Hannah Miller	New Zealand	16:40.54	Q
11	1	Knight Aciru	Uganda	16:41.34	q
12	2	Joana Ferreira	Portugal	17:04.82	q, PB
13	2	Arati Dattatray Patil	India	17:17.05	q
14	2	Aynslee van Graan	South Africa	17:21.32	q
15	1	Noel Palmer	United States	17:24.29	q
16	1	Nokuthula Dlamini	South Africa	17:38.01	
17	2	Maria Larsen	Denmark	17:53.22	
18	1	Prajakta Vilas Godbole	India	18:23.92	
19	1	Karen Ayala	Argentina	18:54.99	
	1	Meswat Asmare	Ethiopia	DNS	
	2	Isobel Batt-Doyle	Australia	DNS	
	2	Docus Ajok	Uganda	DNS	

=== Final ===
Official Video

Rank	Name	Nationality	Time	Notes
1st place, gold medalist(s)	Jessica Judd	Great Britain	15:45.82	
2nd place, silver medalist(s)	Nicole Hutchinson	Canada	15:48.06	
3rd place, bronze medalist(s)	Julia van Velthoven	Netherlands	15:51.75	PB
4	Yuna Wada	Japan	15:56.94	
5	Katarzyna Jankowska	Poland	15:57.76	
6	Maria Chiara Cascavilla	Italy	15:59.66	PB
7	Tomomi Musembi Takamatsu	Japan	16:03.57	
8	Caitlin Adams	Australia	16:07.38	
9	Hannah Miller	New Zealand	16:12.40	
10	Achash Kinetibeb	Ethiopia	16:29.86	
11	Knight Aciru	Uganda	16:38.18	PB
12	Arati Dattatray Patil	India	17:02.08	
13	Joana Ferreira	Portugal	17:18.80	
14	Noel Palmer	United States	17:33.48	
15	Aynslee van Graan	South Africa	17:42.76	
