= Simone Christensen Glad =

Danish long-distance runner

Personal information
- Born: 12 August 1990 (age 35)

Sport
- Country: Denmark
- Sport: Long-distance running

Simone Christensen Glad (born 12 August 1990) is a Danish long-distance runner. In 2019, she competed in the senior women's race at the 2019 IAAF World Cross Country Championships held in Aarhus, Denmark. She finished in 81st place.

In 2015, she competed in the senior women's race at the 2015 IAAF World Cross Country Championships held in Guiyang, China. She finished in 70th place.

In 2017, she competed in the senior women's race at the 2017 IAAF World Cross Country Championships held in Kampala, Uganda. She finished in 77th place.
