= Rudo Mhonderwa =

Zimbabwean long-distance runner

Personal information
- Born: 9 September 1995 (age 30)

Sport
- Country: Zimbabwe
- Sport: Long-distance running

Rudo Mhonderwa (born 9 September 1995) is a Zimbabwean long-distance runner. In 2019, she competed in the senior women's race at the 2019 IAAF World Cross Country Championships held in Aarhus, Denmark. She finished in 101st place.

In 2017, she competed in the senior women's race at the 2017 IAAF World Cross Country Championships held in Kampala, Uganda. She finished in 75th place.
