= Deborah Samum =

Kenyan long-distance runner

Personal information
- Born: 27 September 1995 (age 30)

Sport
- Country: Kenya
- Sport: Long-distance running

Deborah Samum (born 27 September 1995) is a Kenyan long-distance runner. She competed in the senior women's race at the 2019 IAAF World Cross Country Championships held in Aarhus, Denmark. She finished in 9th place.
