= Kesaoleboga Molotsane =

South African long-distance runner

Personal information
- Born: 8 January 1992 (age 33)

Sport
- Country: South Africa
- Sport: Long-distance running

Kesaoleboga Molotsane (born 8 January 1992) is a South African long-distance runner. In 2019, she competed in the senior women's race at the 2019 IAAF World Cross Country Championships held in Aarhus, Denmark. She finished in 42nd place.

== Early life ==
Molotsane was born in Thaba ’Nchu in the Free State and started running at the age of five.

In 2017, she competed in the senior women's race at the 2017 IAAF World Cross Country Championships held in Kampala, Uganda. She finished in 35th place. In the same year, she also competed in the women's 5000 metres event at the 2017 Summer Universiade held in Taipei, Taiwan. She finished in 9th place with a personal best of 16:01.76.

== Awards and achievements ==
Mail & Guardian Top 200 Young South Africans
