= Azucena Díaz =

Spanish long-distance runner

Personal information
- Full name: María Azucena Díaz Calvo
- Born: 19 December 1982 (age 43) Madrid, Spain
- Height: 163 cm (5 ft 4 in)
- Weight: 55 kg (121 lb)

Sport
- Country: Spain
- Sport: Track and field
- Event: Marathon
Medal record
European Championships
Bronze medal – third place	2018 Berlin	Marathon Team

María Azucena Díaz Calvo (Note: In this Spanish name, the first or paternal surname is Díaz and the second or maternal family name is Calvo.) (born 19 December 1982) is a Spanish long-distance runner who specialises in the marathon. She competed in the women's marathon event at the 2016 Summer Olympics.

== Achievements ==
Year	Competition	Venue	Position	Event	Notes
Representing Spain
2008	World Half Marathon Championships	Rio de Janeiro, Brazil	16th	Half marathon	1:13:30
2010	World Half Marathon Championships	Nanning, China	34th	Half marathon	1:15:38
2012	World Half Marathon Championships	Kavarna, Bulgaria	23rd	Half marathon	1:14:05
2013	World Cross Country Championships	Bydgoszcz, Poland	50th	8 km	26:07
2016	European Championships	Amsterdam, Netherlands	36th	Half marathon	1:14:21
2016	Summer Olympics	Rio de Janeiro, Brazil	34th	Marathon	2:35:02
2017	World Cross Country Championships	Kampala, Uganda	27th	10 km	35:06
2018	European Championships	Berlin, Germany	13th	Marathon	2:34:00
2019	World Cross Country Championships	Aarhus, Denmark	65th	10 km cross	40:27
