= Claire Duck =

British long-distance runner

Personal information
- Born: 29 August 1985 (age 40)

Sport
- Country: United Kingdom
- Event: Long-distance running

Claire Duck (born 29 August 1985) is a British long-distance runner.

In 2017, she competed in the senior women's race at the 2017 IAAF World Cross Country Championships held in Kampala, Uganda. She finished in 62nd place.
