= Felistus Chitoshi =

Zambian long-distance runner

Personal information
- Born: 5 January 1997 (age 28)

Sport
- Country: Zambia
- Sport: Long-distance running

Felistus Chitoshi (born 5 January 1997) is a Zambian long-distance runner. In 2019, she competed in the senior women's race at the 2019 IAAF World Cross Country Championships held in Aarhus, Denmark. She finished in 88th place.
