= Natalia Elisante Sulle =

Tanzanian long-distance runner

Personal information
- Born: 19 July 1988 (age 37)

Sport
- Country: Tanzania
- Sport: Long-distance running

Natalia Elisante Sulle (born 19 July 1988) is a Tanzanian long-distance runner. She competed in the senior women's race at the 2019 IAAF World Cross Country Championships held in Aarhus, Denmark. She finished in 68th place.

In 2019, she represented Tanzania at the African Games held in Rabat, Morocco. She competed in the women's half marathon and she finished in 7th place with a time of 1:14:33.
