= Yukina Ueda =

Japanese long-distance runner

Personal information
- Born: 7 February 1998 (age 28)

Sport
- Country: Japan
- Sport: Long-distance running

Yukina Ueda (Japanese: 上田 雪菜; born 7 February 1998) is a Japanese long-distance runner. She competed in the senior women's race at the 2019 IAAF World Cross Country Championships held in Aarhus, Denmark. She finished in 47th place.
