= Tanzania at the 2023 African Games =

- Flag of Tanzania
- IOC code: TAN
- NOC: Tanzania Olympic Committee

in Accra, Ghana 8 March 2024 – 23 March 2024
- Competitors: 75 in 7 sports
- Medals Ranked 40th: Gold 0 Silver 0 Bronze 3 Total 3

African Games appearances (overview)
- 1965; 1973; 1978; 1987; 1991; 1995; 1999; 2003; 2007; 2011; 2015; 2019; 2023

Tanzania competed at the 2023 African Games held from 8 to 23 March 2024 in Accra, Ghana. Tanzania competed in 7 sports.

== Medal table ==
Medal	Name	Sport	Event	Date
Bronze	Ezra Mwanjwanga	Boxing	Men's −60 kg	22 March
Bronze	Yusufu Changarawe	Boxing	Men's −80 kg	22 March
Bronze	Mussa Maregesi	Boxing	Men's −86 kg	22 March
