= Stella Chesang =

Ugandan runner

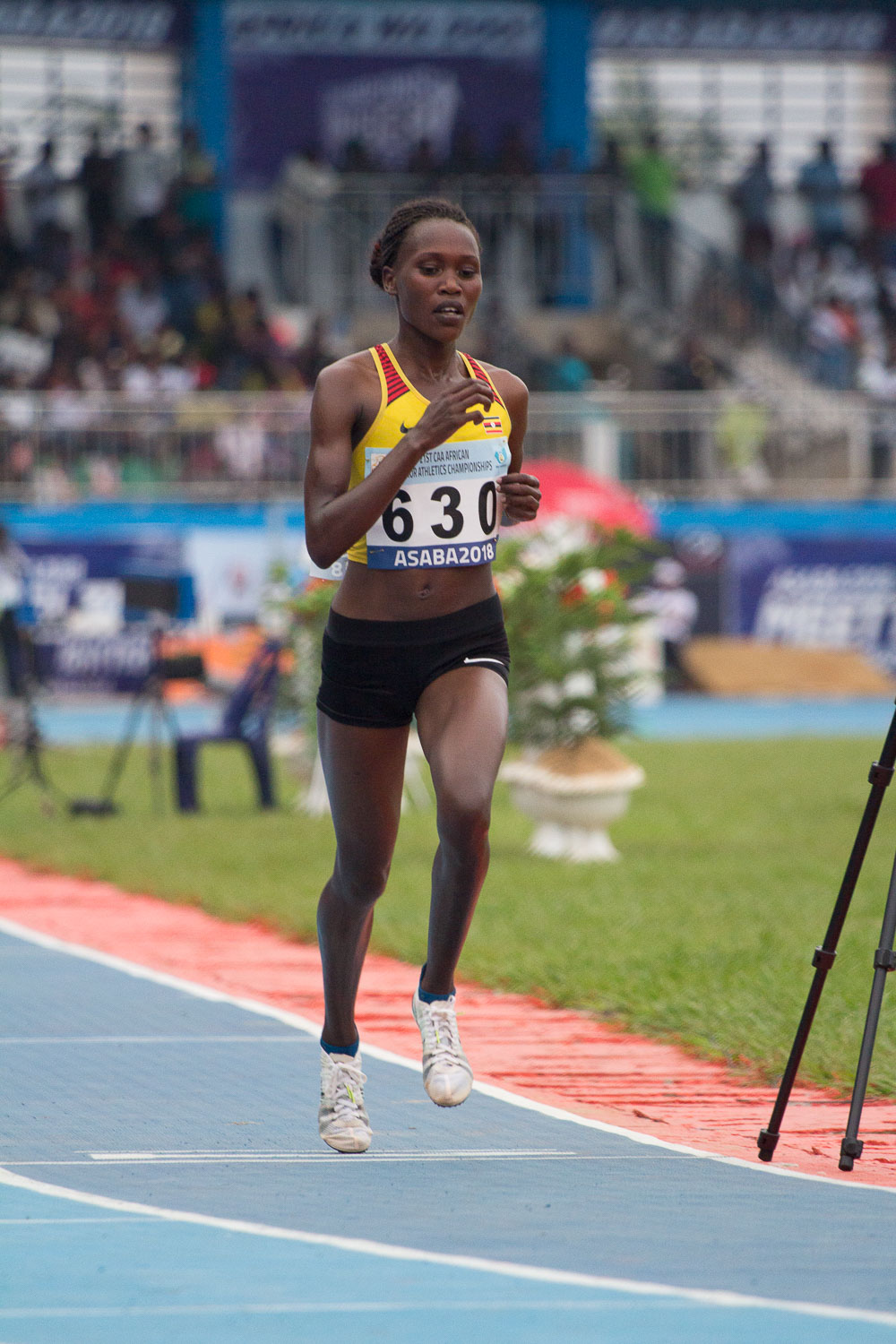
- Chesang at the 2018 African Championships in Athletics

Personal information
- Born: 1 December 1996 (age 29) Serere Village, Kween District, Uganda
- Spouse: Ronald Kwemoi

Sport
- Country: Uganda
- Sport: Athletics
- Event: Long-distance running

Achievements and titles
- Personal bests: 3000 m: 8:52.39 NU20R (Hengelo 2015); 5000 m: 15:00.72 (Hengelo 2019); 10,000 m: 31:01.04 NR (Eugene 2022); Road; 10 km: 30:40 (Cape Town 2022); Half marathon: 1:08:11 NR (New Delhi 2022)
Medal record
Women's athletics
Representing Uganda
Commonwealth Games
Gold medal – first place	2018 Gold Coast	10,000 m
African U20 Championships
Bronze medal – third place	2015 Addis Ababa	5000 m
World Cross Country Championships
Bronze medal – third place	2023 Bathurst	Senior team

Stella Chesang (born 1 December 1996) is a Ugandan long-distance runner. She won the gold medal in the 10,000 metres at the 2018 Commonwealth Games.

Chesang earned bronze for the 5000 metres at the 2015 African Under-20 Championships. She represented Uganda at the 2016 Rio Olympics. She is the Ugandan record holder for the 10,000 m and half marathon.

== Background and education ==
Chesang was born on 1 December 1996 in Serere Village, Benet sub-county, Kween District, Uganda to Juliet Cheptoris and Patrick Kusuro. She is the second born in a family of nine siblings. She attended Benet Primary School before she transferred to Chemwania High School in Kween for her O-Level studies. Later, she graduated from Kyambogo University, with a degree in sports science.

== Police career ==
During her primary school days, Chesang won all athletic races that she competed in. She was awarded a full academic scholarship during her four-year O-Level studies at Chemwania High School. While in Senior 3, manager of Kapchorwa Athletics Association requested Stella's parents that she goes and lives in his camp, so that she could train with other talented athletes on a regular scheduled basis. It was here that the Uganda Police Force Athletic Club found and recruited her as a police officer and member of the Uganda Police Athletic Club.

Following her winning the gold medal in the 10,000 metres at the 2018 Commonwealth Games, Chesang was promoted from the rank of Special Police Constable (SPC) to the rank of Inspector of Police (IP).

== Athletic career ==
She won the World Mountain Running Championships in 2015 and the Ugandan Cross Country Championships in 2016.

== International competitions ==
Representing Uganda
Year	Competition	Venue	Position	Event	Result
2011	World Cross Country Championships	Punta Umbría, Spain	39th	U20 race	21:16
2013	World Cross Country Championships	Bydgoszcz, Poland	14th	U20 race	19:09
2013	World Youth Championships	Donetsk, Ukraine	4th	3000 m	9:11.03
2014	World Junior Championships	Eugene, OR, United States	4th	5000 m	15:53.85 NU20R
2014	African Championships	Marrakesh, Morocco	–	5000 m	DNF
2015	Africa Junior Championships	Addis Ababa, Ethiopia	3rd	5000 m	17:04.91
2015	World Cross Country Championships	Guiyang, China	11th	U20 race	20:37
2016	Olympic Games	Rio de Janeiro, Brazil	25th (h)	5000 m	15:49.80
2017	World Cross Country Championships	Kampala, Uganda	18th	Senior race	34:27
2017	World Championships	London, United Kingdom	24th (h)	5000 m	15:23.02
2018	Commonwealth Games	Gold Coast, Australia	1st	10,000 m	31:45.30
2018	African Championships	Asaba, Nigeria	4th	10,000 m	32:29.54
2019	World Cross Country Championships	Aarhus, Denmark	21st	Senior race	38:14
2019	African Games	Rabat, Morocco	7th	5000 m	15:49.87
2019	World Championships	Doha, Qatar	16th	10,000 m	32:15.20
2022	World Championships	Eugene, OR, United States	14th	10,000 m	31:01.04 NR
2022	Commonwealth Games	Birmingham, United Kingdom	9th	5000 m	15:19.01 SB
2022	Commonwealth Games	Birmingham, United Kingdom	4th	10,000 m	31:14.14
2023	World Cross Country Championships	Bathurst, Australia	10th	Senior race	34:58
2023	World Cross Country Championships	Bathurst, Australia	3rd	Team	41 pts
2023	World Championships	Budapest, Hungary	16th	10,000 m	32:38.90
2025	World Championships	Tokyo, Japan	12th	Marathon	2:31:13
Mountain races
2014	African Mountain Running Championships	Obudu, Nigeria	1st	8,6 km race	1:01:31
2015	World Mountain Running Championships	Betws-y-Coed, United Kingdom	1st	8,9 km race	37:52
2015	World Mountain Running Championships	Betws-y-Coed, United Kingdom	3rd	Women's team	28 pts
