= Tanzania at the 2003 All-Africa Games =

- IOC code: TAN
- NOC: Tanzania Olympic Committee

in Abuja 5 October 2003 – 17 October 2003
- Medals: Gold 1 Silver 0 Bronze 1 Total 2

All-Africa Games appearances
- 1965; 1973; 1978; 1987; 1991; 1995; 1999; 2003; 2007; 2011; 2015; 2019; 2023

Youth appearances
- 2010; 2014

Tanzania competed in the 2003 All-Africa Games held at the National Stadium in the city of Abuja, Nigeria.

== Medal summary ==
Tanzania won 2 medals, a gold and a bronze. This was the first time that the country had won a gold medal in the games since 1965.

=== Medal table ===
Sport	Gold	Silver	Bronze	Total
Athletics	1	0	1	2
Total	1	0	1	2

== List of Medalists ==
=== Gold Medal ===
Medal	Name	Sport	Event	Date	Ref
Gold	Samwel Mwera	Athletics	Men's 800m		

=== Bronze Medal ===
Medal	Name	Sport	Event	Date	Ref
Bronze	Lwiza John	Athletics	Women's 800m		

== See also ==
- Tanzania at the African Games
