= Maria Moloney =

Australian rules footballer

- Moloney in 2026

Personal information
- Born: 29 March 1995 (age 31)
- Original team: University of Queensland (QWAFL)
- Draft: No. 75, 2019 AFL Women's draft
- Debut: Round 1, 2020, Brisbane vs. Adelaide, at Hickey Park
- Height: 165 cm (5 ft 5 in)
- Position: Midfielder

Club information
- Current club: Port Adelaide
- Number: 9

Playing career^{1}
Years	Club	Games (Goals)
2020–2022 (S6)	Brisbane	11 (2)
2022 (S7)–	Port Adelaide	17 (2)
Total		28 (4)
- ^{1} Playing statistics correct to the end of the 2023 season.

Maria Moloney (born 29 March 1995) is an Australian rules footballer playing for Port Adelaide in the AFL Women's competition (AFLW). She was playing for University of Queensland in the AFL Queensland Women's League when she was drafted by Brisbane with the 75th pick in the 2019 AFL Women's draft.

== Pre-AFLW ==
Moloney is from Panmure, Victoria and moved as a young adult to work the RAAF Base Amberley (Ipswich) in Queensland. While stationed there as a flight sargeant Moloney played for the University of Queensland in the AFL Queensland Women's League and was scouted by the Lions for outstanding fitness as having midfielder potential.

== AFLW career ==
Moloney made her debut for Brisbane in their round 1 game against Adelaide at Hickey Park on 8 February 2020.

In May 2022, Moloney committed to join expansion side Port Adelaide.

Long-distance runner Virginia Moloney is her sister.
