= Robbie Simpson (runner) =

British long-distance runner

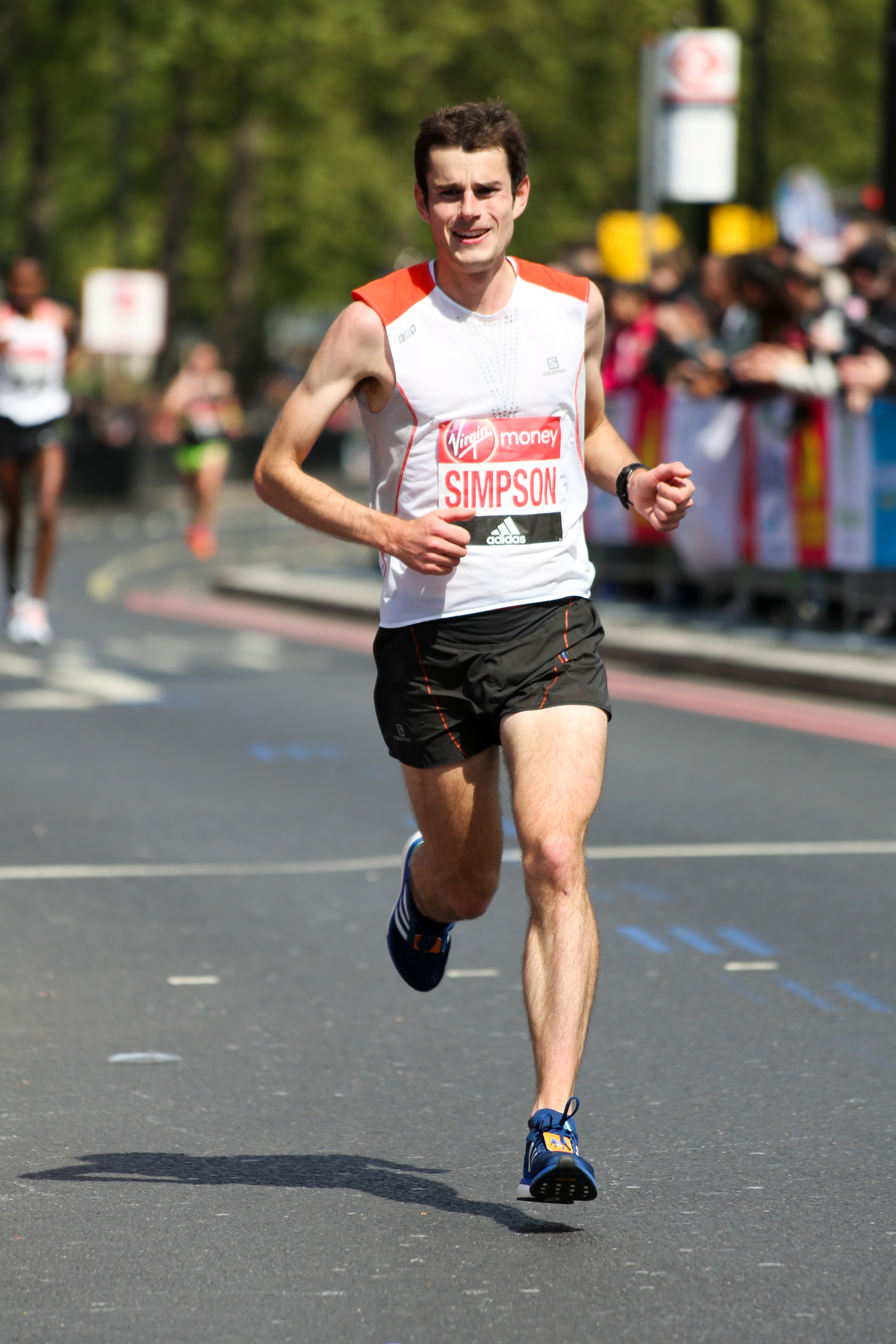
- Simpson at the 2017 London Marathon

Personal information
- Nationality: Scottish
- Born: 14 November 1991 (age 34) Wegberg, Germany
- Height: 1.80 m (5 ft 11 in)
- Weight: 69 kg (152 lb)

Sport
- Country: Great Britain, Scotland
- Sport: Athletics
- Event: Marathon

Achievements and titles
- Personal best: Marathon: 2:14:56 (2019)
Medal record
Representing Scotland
Men's athletics
Commonwealth Games
Bronze medal – third place	2018 Gold Coast	Marathon
Representing Great Britain
Men's mountain running
World Championships
Bronze medal – third place	2015 Betws-y-Coed	Senior race
Bronze medal – third place	2015 Betws-y-Coed	Senior team
European Championships
Silver medal – second place	2014 Gap	Senior race
Commonwealth Championships
Silver medal – second place	2011 Llanberis	Mountain race

Robbie Simpson (born 14 November 1991) is a British male long-distance runner who competes in marathon and mountain running events. He was a silver medallist at the 2014 European Mountain Running Championships and a bronze medallist at the 2015 World Mountain Running Championships. He won his first international marathon medal (a bronze) at the 2018 Commonwealth Games.

Simpson has competed five times at the European Mountain Running Championships (2009, 2012, 2013, 2014, 2015) and five times at the World Mountain Running Championships (2008, 2009, 2012, 2014, 2015). He won the 2016 and 2018 editions of the Jungfrau Marathon and ranked in the top 20 at the 2016 and 2017 London Marathon. He holds a personal best of 2:14:56 for the marathon.

== International competitions ==
Year	Competition	Venue	Position	Event	Notes
2008	World Mountain Running Trophy	Crans-Montana, Switzerland	42nd	Junior race	47:01.1
2009	World Mountain Running Championships	Madesimo, Italy	18th	Junior race	42:33
2009	European Mountain Running Championships	Telfes, Austria	14th	Junior race	54:34
2011	Commonwealth Mountain Running Championships	Llanberis, United Kingdom	2nd	Senior race	50:20
2012	World Mountain Running Championship	Ponte di Legno, Italy	18th	Senior race	66:47
2012	European Mountain Running Championships	Denizli–Pamukkale, Turkey	19th	Senior race	53:23
2013	European Mountain Running Championships	Borovets, Bulgaria	29th	Senior race	61:46
2014	World Mountain Running Championships	Massa, Italy	30th	Senior race	60:39
2014	European Mountain Running Championships	Gap, France	2nd	Senior race	56:19
2015	World Mountain Running Championships	Betws-y-Coed, United Kingdom	3rd	Senior race	50:31
2015	World Mountain Running Championships	Betws-y-Coed, United Kingdom	3rd	Senior team	46 pts
2015	European Mountain Running Championships	Porto Moniz, Portugal	4th	Senior race	63:20
2018	Commonwealth Games	Gold Coast, Australia	3rd	Marathon	2:19:36
