= Rika Kaseda =

Japanese long-distance runner

Personal information
- Born: 2 March 1999 (age 27)

Sport
- Country: Japan
- Sport: Long-distance running
Medal record
Women's long-distance running
Representing Japan
Summer Universiade
Gold medal – first place	2019 Naples	Half marathon team
Silver medal – second place	2019 Naples	Half marathon

Rika Kaseda (Japanese: 加世田 梨花, romanized: Kaseda Rika; born 2 March 1999) is a Japanese long-distance runner who won the silver medal in the women's half marathon at the 2019 Summer Universiade in Naples, Italy, and a gold medal in the half marathon team event. She placed 46th in the senior women's race at the 2019 IAAF World Cross Country Championships in Aarhus, Denmark.
