= Virginia Moloney =

Australian long-distance runner

Personal information
- Born: 6 May 1990 (age 35)

Sport
- Country: Australia
- Event: Long-distance running

Virginia Moloney (born 6 May 1990) is an Australian long-distance runner.

In 2016, she won the women's race at the Melbourne Marathon. A year earlier she finished in 4th place in this event.

In 2017, she competed in the senior women's race at the 2017 IAAF World Cross Country Championships held in Kampala, Uganda. She finished in 79th place.

In 2018, she competed in the women's marathon at the 2018 Commonwealth Games held in Gold Coast, Australia. She finished in 16th place.

Australian rules footballer Maria Moloney is her sister.
