= Tanzania at the 1999 All-Africa Games =

- IOC code: TAN
- NOC: Tanzania Olympic Committee

in Algiers 10 September 1999 – 19 September 1999
- Medals: Gold 0 Silver 1 Bronze 0 Total 1

All-Africa Games appearances
- 1965; 1973; 1978; 1987; 1991; 1995; 1999; 2003; 2007; 2011; 2015; 2019; 2023

Tanzania competed in the 1999 All-Africa Games held in the city of Johannesburg, South Africa. The team won a single silver medal when Fokasi Wilbrod Fullah came second in the marathon.

== Medal summary ==
Tanzania won a single silver medal. Fokasi Wilbrod Fullah was second to Joshua Peterson of South Africa in the marathon with a time of 2:20:47.

=== Medal table ===
Sport	Gold	Silver	Bronze	Total
Athletics	0	1	0	1
Total	0	1	0	1

== List of Medalists ==
Medal	Name	Sport	Event	Date	Ref
Silver	Fokasi Wilbrod Fullah	Athletics	Marathon		

== See also ==
- Tanzania at the African Games
