= Angelina Tsere =

Tanzanian long-distance runner (born 1999)

Personal information
- Full name: Angelina Daniel Tsere
- Born: 23 August 1999 (age 26)

Sport
- Country: Tanzania
- Sport: Long-distance running

Angelina Daniel Tsere (born 23 August 1999) is a Tanzanian long-distance runner. She competed in the senior women's race at the 2019 IAAF World Cross Country Championships held in Aarhus, Denmark. She finished in 78th place.

In 2017, she competed in the senior women's race at the 2017 IAAF World Cross Country Championships held in Kampala, Uganda. She finished in 37th place.
