= Tanzania at the African Games =

- IOC code: TAN
- NOC: Tanzania Olympic Committee
- Medals: Gold 4 Silver 10 Bronze 10 Total 24

African Games appearances (overview)
- 1965; 1973; 1978; 1987; 1991; 1995; 1999; 2003; 2007; 2011; 2015; 2019; 2023

Tanzania (TAN) has competed at every occurrence of the African Games since its inauguration in 1965. Tanzanian athletes have won a total of 24 medals.

== Medal summary ==
Filbert Bayi, who subsequently broke the world record in the 1500 metres, won the country's first gold medal in 1973. Other gold medalists include Samwel Mwera who beat Mbulaeni Mulaudzi at the Men's 800 metres in 2003. Although the country has not won a medal at every Games, Tanzanian athletes have achieved a total of twenty four medals, including four gold and ten silver.

== Medal tables ==
=== Medals by Games ===
Below is a table representing all Tanzanian medals won at the Games.

Games	Athletes	Gold	Silver	Bronze	Total	Rank
1965 Brazzaville		0	0	1	1	19
1973 Lagos		1	1	0	2	13
1978 Algiers		0	1	1	2	19
1987 Nairobi		0	2	5	7	16
1991 Cairo		1	3	1	5	16
1995 Harare		1	0	1	2	17
1999 Johannesburg		0	1	0	1	25
2003 Abuja		1	0	1	2	18
2007 Algiers		0	1	0	1	32
2011 Maputo	-	0	1	0	1	29
2015 Brazzaville		0	0	0	0	
2019 Rabat		0	0	0	0	
Total		4	10	10	24	

== See also ==
- Tanzania at the Olympics
- Tanzania at the Paralympics
- Sport in Tanzania
