= Jimmi Therkelsen =

Danish BMX rider (born 1991)

Personal information
- Born: 7 July 1991 (age 35)

Cycling career
- Sport: Cycling
- Current team: Denmark
- Discipline: BMX racing
- Role: Rider

Jimmi Therkelsen (born 7 July 1991) is a Danish male BMX rider, representing his nation at international competitions. He competed in the time trial event at the 2015 UCI BMX World Championships.
