= Claire Sumner =

Canadian long-distance runner

Personal information
- Born: 10 March 1995 (age 30)

Sport
- Country: Canada
- Sport: Long-distance running

Claire Sumner (born 10 March 1995) is a Canadian long-distance runner. She competed in the senior women's race at the 2019 IAAF World Cross Country Championships held in Aarhus, Denmark. She finished in 66th place.

In 2017, she competed in the senior women's race at the 2017 IAAF World Cross Country Championships held in Kampala, Uganda. She finished in 51st place. A few months later, she competed in the women's 10,000 metres event at the 2017 Summer Universiade held in Taipei, Taiwan. She finished in 8th place.
