= 2015 African Junior Athletics Championships =

12th African Junior Championships
- Dates: 5–8 March
- Host city: Addis Ababa, Ethiopia
- Venue: Addis Ababa Stadium
- Level: Under-20
- Events: 43

The 2015 African Junior Athletics Championships was the twelfth edition of the biennial, continental athletics tournament for African athletes aged 19 years or younger. It was held at the Addis Ababa Stadium in Addis Ababa, Ethiopia from 5–8 March. It was the first time that Ethiopia hosted the event and followed on from the 2008 African Championships in Athletics, which was hosted at the same venue.

As part of the preparations for the event, the Ethiopian government paid five million Ethiopian birr (around US$250,000) to renovate the host stadium's athletics facilities. The Ethiopian Minister for sport, Abdissa Yadeta, cited the improved international image and promotion of athletics internally as the justifications for the investment. The Ethiopian Broadcasting Corporation held the rights to broadcast the competition and its opening and closing ceremonies on television in the host country, while a French broadcaster held the worldwide broadcasting rights.

The Confederation of African Athletics hosted its two-day congress in the city's African Union Hall, prior to the championships; the serving president Hamad Kalkaba Malboum was re-elected for a third term. Cultural events were also staged alongside the sports competition, with the Ethiopian National Theatre holding concerts to promote the nation's music. Reflecting concern around the Ebola virus epidemic in West Africa, all foreign delegations were screened for the virus upon arrival. The total budget for the hosting costs of the championships (excluding the stadium investment) was estimated at 30 million Ethiopian birr (around USD1.5 million).

Mohamed Magdi Hamza (men's shot put) and Joshua Kiprui Cheptegei (men's 10,000 metres) both set championship records. Cheptegei and Yomif Kejelcha won the same long-distance events as they had at the 2014 World Junior Championships in Athletics. Divine Oduduru, the 2013 men's 200 metres champion, returned and defended his title and expanded his honours include the 100 metres and 4×100 metres relay gold medals. Reigning Commonwealth Games champion, Ese Brume defended her long jump title with a championship record mark and was the stand-out athlete of the meeting, winning this title as well as a triple jump gold, 100 m bronze, and 4×100 m gold with Nigeria (also in a championship record). Dawit Seyaum was the third athlete to return and defend their title, doing so in the women's 1500 metres, and also the third reigning World Junior champion to win at the meet.

== Medal table ==
* Host nation (Ethiopia)

Rank	NOC	Gold	Silver	Bronze	Total
1	Nigeria (NGR)	12	8	7	27
2	South Africa (RSA)	9	7	7	23
3	Ethiopia (ETH)	6	12	10	28
4	Egypt (EGY)	5	5	3	13
5	Kenya (KEN)	4	5	3	12
6	Algeria (ALG)	2	1	2	5
7	Botswana (BOT)	2	1	0	3
8	Morocco (MAR)	1	1	3	5
9	Uganda (UGA)	1	0	2	3
10	Tunisia (TUN)	1	0	1	2
11	Ivory Coast (CIV)	0	1	0	1
11	Namibia (NAM)	0	1	0	1
11	Zimbabwe (ZIM)	0	1	0	1
14	Congo (CGO)	0	0	1	1
14	Madagascar (MAD)	0	0	1	1
14	Zambia (ZAM)	0	0	1	1
Totals (16 entries)		43	43	41	127

== Medal summary ==
=== Men ===
Event	Gold		Silver		Bronze	
100 metres	Divine Oduduru (NGR)	10.44	Arthur Gue Cissé (CIV)	10.63	Sydney Siame (ZAM)	10.77
200 metres	Divine Oduduru (NGR)	21.22	Victor Peka (NGR)	21.53	Gilles Anthony Afoumba (CGO)	21.59
400 metres	Karabo Sibanda (BOT)	46.33	Alexander Sampao (KEN)	46.54	Adekunle Rilwan Fasasi (NGR)	46.84
800 metres	Patrick Kiprotich Ronoh (KEN)	1:50.21	Jonah Koech Kipruto (KEN)	1:50.88	Temam Tura (ETH)	1:51.06
1500 metres	Anthony Kiptoo (KEN)	3:43.98	Gilbert Kwemoi (KEN)	3:44.59	Chala Regasa (ETH)	3:44.92
5000 metres	Yomif Kejelcha (ETH)	14:31.03	Fredrick Kiptoo (KEN)	14:34.06	Daniel Kipkemoi Mamba (KEN)	14:39.32
10,000 metres	Joshua Cheptegei (UGA)	29:58.70	Davis Kiplagat (KEN)	29:59.32	Gurmessa Nega (ETH)	30:02.38
110 metres hurdles	Abdullahi Bashiru (NGR)	13.99	Amine Bouanani (ALG)	14.24	Rivaldo Robberts (RSA)	14.27
400 metres hurdles	Larry Lombaard (RSA)	51.80	Abebe Robi (ETH)	52.13	Avotrin Rakotoarimiandry (MAD)	53.29
3000 metres steeplechase	Abraham Kibiwott (KEN)	8:47.43	Wogene Sidamo (ETH)	8:51.57	Amare Tegegn (ETH)	9:01.58
4×100 metres relay	Nigeria (NGR); Thankgod Igube; Victor Peka; Chuwudi Olisakwe; Divine Oduduru	39.99	Botswana (BOT); Thabiso Sekgopi; Leungo Scotch; Karabo Mothibi; Vincent Basima	40.95	South Africa (RSA); Larry Lombaard; Rivaldo Robberts; Hanno Coetzer; Darren de Bruin	41.46
4×400 metres relay	Botswana (BOT); Karabo Sibanda; Leungo Scotch; Unod Keetile; Vincent Basima	3:11.00	Ethiopia (ETH); Kenenisa Bali; Aduga Tesfaye; Haji Beker; Gezahagne Feleke	3:11.19	Nigeria (NGR); Omeiza Akerele; Adewale Sikiru Adeyemi; Abdulsalam Audu; Rilwan Adekunle Fasasi	3:11.20
10,000 m walk	Mahmoud Mohamed Mahmoud (EGY)	48:47.90	Gemechu Biratu (ETH)	49:06.89	Mohammed Fekkoun (ALG)	53:05.62
High jump	Hichem Bouhanoune (ALG)	2.12 m	Mpho Links (RSA)	2.10 m	Theddus Okpara (NGR)	2.06 m
Pole vault	Seifeddine Mejri (TUN)	4.40 m	Ituah Enahoro (NGR)	4.10 m	Mostafa Ramadan Mohamed (EGY)	3.50 m
Long jump	Mouhcine Khoua (MAR)	7.45 m	Theddus Okpara (NGR)	7.44 m	Yasser Triki (ALG)	7.39 m
Triple jump	Haithem Sebbat (ALG)	15.39 m	Brian Mada (ZIM)	15.30 m	Marouane Aissaoui (MAR)	15.30 m
Shot put	Mohamed Magdi Hamza (EGY)	20.66 m CR AJR	Shehab Abdeaziz (EGY)	18.43 m	Jason van Rooyen (RSA)	17.73 m
Discus throw	Johan Scholtz (RSA)	57.57 m	Hassan El Shabrawy (EGY)	54.74 m	Jason van Rooyen (RSA)	52.68 m
Hammer throw	Ismail Tarek Ahmed (EGY)	74.46 m	Tshepang Makhethe (RSA)	74.28 m	Hassar Abdellah (MAR)	67.64 m
Javelin throw	Bahaa Khalil Sherif (EGY)	70.09 m	Leon Loubser (RSA)	67.69 m	Othow Ojulu (ETH)	66.23 m

=== Women ===
Event	Gold		Silver		Bronze	
100 metres	Tamzin Thomas (RSA)	11.69	Aniekeme Alphonsus (NGR)	11.83	Ese Brume (NGR)	11.86
200 metres w:-1.6 m/s	Praise Idamadudu (NGR)	23.76	Tegest Yuma (ETH)	23.84 NR	Aniekeme Alphonsus (NGR)	24.19
400 metres	Olowatosin Adeloye (NGR)	54.09	Esther Asamu (NGR)	55.11	Tegest Yuma (ETH)	55.24
800 metres	Chaltu Regasa (ETH)	2:09.20	Kore Nagaho (ETH)	2:09.61	Susan Aneno (UGA)	2:11.73
1500 metres	Dawit Seyaum (ETH)	4:15.94	Besu Beko (ETH)	4:17.11	Irene Chepkemoi (KEN)	4:26.19
3000 metres	Medina Nigussie (ETH)	9:31.37	Suru Galchu (ETH)	9:34.48	Felis Sandra Chebet (KEN)	9:38.60
5000 metres	Etagegn Woldu (ETH)	17:02.71	Sintayehu Lewetegn (ETH)	17:03.87	Stella Chesang (UGA)	17:04.91
100 metres hurdles	Oluwatobiloba Amusan (NGR)	14.26	Lina Amr Gaber Ahmed (EGY)	14.48	Temidayo Osinbanjo (NGR)	14.58
400 metres hurdles	Gizelle Magerman (RSA)	59.41	Daisy Akpofa (NGR)	60.35	Glory Onome Nathaniel (NGR)	60.51
3000 metres steeplechase	Stella Jepkosgei Rutto (KEN)	10:22.47	Zewdine Teklemariam (ETH)	10:31.40	Mihret Adhena (ETH)	10:37.26
4×100 metres relay	Nigeria (NGR); Aniekeme Alphonsus; Omotayo Abolaji; Blessing Adiakerehawa; Ese Brume	44.83 CR	South Africa (RSA); Carla Johnson; Simone du Plooy; Robyn Haupt; Tamzin Thomas	46.49	Ethiopia (ETH); Fayo Frew; Besa Kedir; Mintamir Emagnu; Abise Kebede	48.30
4×400 metres relay	Nigeria (NGR); Esther Asamu; Yinka Ajayi; Praise Idamadudu; Olowatosin Adeloye	3:38.94	Ethiopia (ETH); Kore Nagaho; Neima Suraj; Chaltu Regasa; Tegest Yuma	3:48.57	Not awarded^{[nb]}	
5000 m walk	Yehuaeye Mitiku (ETH)	24:49.11	Ayalnesh Negatu (ETH)	25:41.52	Chahinez Nasri (TUN)	27:08.52
High jump	Marlize Higgins (RSA)	1.80 m	Julia du Plessis (RSA)	1.75 m	Ghizlane Siba (MAR)	1.75 m
Pole vault	Louise Sparks Kaytlin (RSA)	3.40 m	Klilou Nahid (MAR)	2.20 m	Only two finishers	
Long jump	Ese Brume (NGR)	6.33 m CR	Carla Johnson (RSA)	5.92 m	Esraa Owis Samir Mohamed (EGY)	5.89 m
Triple jump	Ese Brume (NGR)	13.16 m	Esraa Samir Owis Mohamed (EGY)	13.04 m NR	Zinzi Chabangu (RSA)	13.03 m
Shot put	Monique Wagner (RSA)	13.96 m	Judith Anulika Aniefuna (NGR)	13.53 m	Amele Muluadam (ETH)	12.23 m NR
Discus throw	Leandri Geel (RSA)	46.76 m	Amira Sayed Khaled (EGY)	44.60 m	Fatma Eladly Khaled (EGY)	43.19 m
Hammer throw	Israa Mostafa Mohamed (EGY)	57.85 m	Stefanie Greyling (RSA)	53.71 m	Letitia Janse van Rensburg (RSA)	52.42 m
Javelin throw	Jo-Ane van Dyk (RSA)	49.47 m	Kelechi Nwanaga (NGR)	46.46 m	Shura Jilo (ETH)	43.85 m
Heptathlon	Temidayo Osinbanjo (NGR)	4765 pts	Kaiqtion Kruger (NAM)	4641 pts	Nienka du Toit (RSA)	4490 pts

- ^{nb} The women's 4×400 m relay had three entering teams Nigeria, Ethiopia and Kenya, but the bronze medal was not awarded as the Kenya team were disqualified.
