= Kaori Morita =

Japanese long-distance runner

Personal information
- Born: 19 September 1995 (age 30)

Sport
- Country: Japan
- Event: Long-distance running

Kaori Morita (森田 香織, Morita Kaori; born 19 September 1995) is a Japanese long-distance runner.

In 2017, she competed in the senior women's race at the 2017 IAAF World Cross Country Championships held in Kampala, Uganda. She finished in 80th place.

In 2018, she competed in the women's half marathon at the 2018 IAAF World Half Marathon Championships held in Valencia, Spain. She finished in 17th place.
