= Caitlin Adams =

Australian long-distance runner

Personal information
- Born: 7 July 1997 (age 28)

Sport
- Country: Australia
- Sport: Long-distance running

Caitlin Adams (born 7 July 1997) is an Australian long-distance runner. She competed in the senior women's race at the 2019 IAAF World Cross Country Championships held in Aarhus, Denmark. She finished in 69th place.

In 2019, she also competed in the women's 5000 metres event at the 2019 Summer Universiade held in Naples, Italy. She finished in 8th place.

She won the 2025 Melbourne Marathon.
