= Sara Ramadhani =

Tanzanian long-distance runner

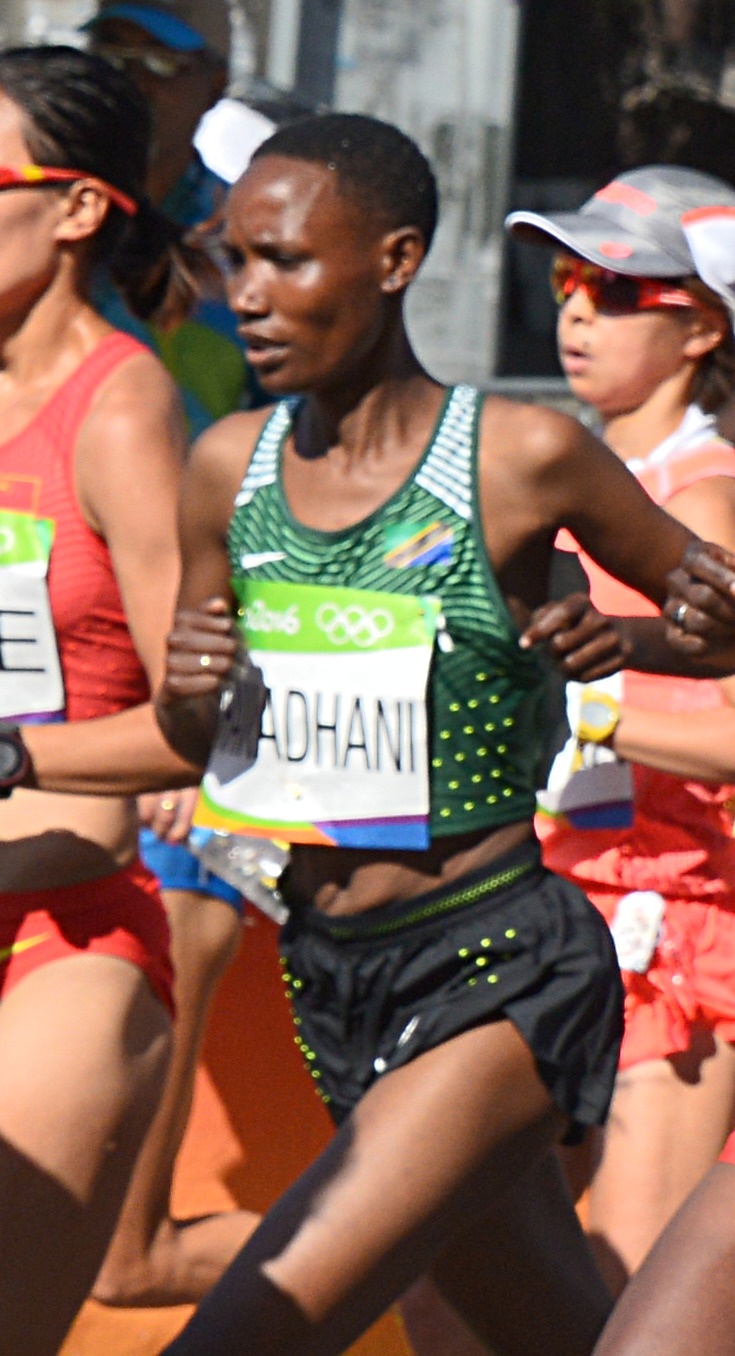
- Ramadhani at the 2016 Olympics

Personal information
- Born: 30 December 1987 (age 38)
- Weight: 45 kg (99 lb)

Sport
- Sport: Track and field
- Event: Marathon

Achievements and titles
- Personal best: 2:45:00

Sara Ramadhani Makera (born 30 December 1987) is a Tanzanian long-distance runner who specialises in the marathon. She competed in the women's marathon event at the 2016 Summer Olympics where she finished in 121st place with a time of 3:00:03.

In 2019, she represented Tanzania at the 2019 African Games held in Rabat, Morocco. She competed in the women's half marathon and she did not finish her race.
