= Athletics at the 2007 All-Africa Games – Men's half marathon =

The men's half marathon event at the 2007 All-Africa Games was held on July 20.

== Results ==
Rank	Name	Nationality	Time	Notes
1st place, gold medalist(s)	Deriba Merga	Ethiopia	1:02:24	GR
2nd place, silver medalist(s)	Martin Sulle	Tanzania	1:03:01	
3rd place, bronze medalist(s)	Yonas Kifle	Eritrea	1:03:19	
4	Dieudonné Disi	Rwanda	1:04:04	
5	John Mutai	Kenya	1:04:37	
6	Yahia Azaidj	Algeria	1:04:41	
7	Samson Kiflemariam	Eritrea	1:05:15	
8	Tariku Jifar	Ethiopia	1:05:26	
9	Eshetu Wondimu	Ethiopia	1:05:45	
10	Virimai Juwawo	Zimbabwe	1:06:09	
11	Sylvain Rukundo	Rwanda	1:06:16	
12	Joao Ntyamba	Angola	1:06:26	
13	John Yuda	Tanzania	1:06:35	
14	Lebenya Nkoka	Lesotho	1:06:39	
15	Yared Asmerom	Eritrea	1:07:01	
16	Kamel Kohil	Algeria	1:07:09	
17	Nabil Benkrama	Algeria	1:07:52	
18	Bethuel Netshivhe	South Africa	1:08:19	
19	Abdoulaye Abdelkarim	Chad	1:08:37	
20	Rachid Safari	Rwanda	1:09:17	
21	Julius Kimutai	Kenya	1:09:18	
22	Ilunga Mande	Democratic Republic of the Congo	1:09:21	
23	Samwel Kwaang'w	Tanzania	1:09:22	
24	Kabirou Dan Malam	Niger	1:09:37	
25	Ernest Ndjissipou	Central African Republic	1:10:08	
26	Siphesihle Mdluli	Swaziland	1:10:17	
27	Tsotang Maine	Lesotho	1:10:24	
28	Faredj Bachir	Libya	1:10:50	
29	George Mofokeng	South Africa	1:11:10	
30	Zongamele Dubeni	South Africa	1:11:40	
31	Mohammed Nuiju	Nigeria	1:16:38	
	Mabothile Lebopo	Lesotho	DNF	
	Nicaise Ngoamandji	Central African Republic	DNF	
	Ali Mabrouk El Zaidi	Libya	DNS	
