= Failuna Abdi Matanga =

Tanzanian long-distance runner

Personal information
- Nationality: Tanzanian
- Born: 28 October 1992 (age 33) Dodoma-Kondoa-Hachwi

Sport
- Sport: Long-distance running
- Event: 10,000 metres

Failuna Abdi Matanga (born 28 October 1992) is a Tanzanian long-distance runner. She competed in the women's 10,000 metres at the 2017 World Championships in Athletics. In 2019, she competed in the senior women's race at the 2019 IAAF World Cross Country Championships held in Aarhus, Denmark. She finished in 16th place.

In June 2021, she qualified to represent Tanzania at the 2020 Summer Olympics.
