= Doreen Chemutai =

Ugandan long-distance runner

Personal information
- Born: 23 October 1996 (age 28)

Sport
- Country: Uganda

Doreen Chemutai (born 23 October 1996) is a Ugandan long-distance runner.

She finished fourteenth at the 2015 World Mountain Running Championships and won a bronze medal in the team competition. At the 2017 World Cross Country Championships she finished 21st in the senior race and fourth in the team competition. In 2020, she competed in the women's half marathon at the 2020 World Athletics Half Marathon Championships held in Gdynia, Poland.

Her personal best times are 33:09.49 minutes in the 10,000 metres, achieved in May 2016 in Castelporziano; 34:32 minutes in the 10 kilometres, achieved in June 2017 in Langueux; and 1:14:47 hours in the half marathon, achieved in October 2015 in Arezzo.
