= Jennifer Nesbitt =

British long-distance runner

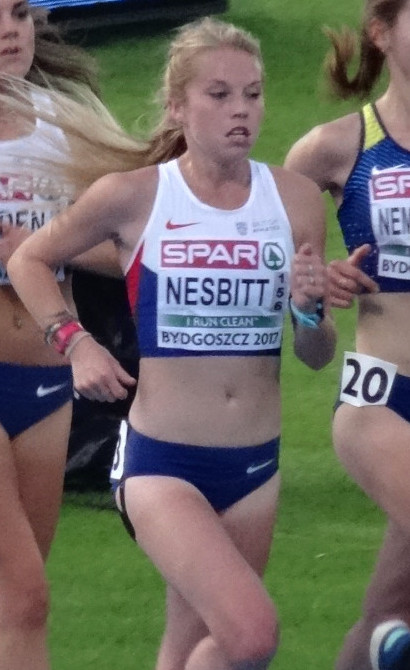
Jennifer Nesbitt in 2017

Jennifer-Louise Nesbitt (born 24 January 1995), also known as Jenny Nesbitt, is a British long-distance runner. She represented Wales in the 10000m at the 2018 Commonwealth Games.

In 2019, she competed in the senior women's race at the 2019 IAAF World Cross Country Championships held in Aarhus, Denmark. She finished in 34th place.

== Major competition record ==
Year	Competition	Venue	Position	Event	Time	Source
2016	Reading Half Marathon	Reading, United Kingdom	1st	Half marathon	01:12:54	
2017	European U23 Championships	Bydgoszcz, Poland	6th	10,000 m	00:33:50.37	
2017	Universiade	Taipei, Taiwan	5th	10,000 m	00:34:01.34	
