= Nélida Sulca =

Peruvian long-distance runner

Personal information
- Born: 10 July 1987 (age 38)

Sport
- Country: Peru
- Sport: Long-distance running

Nélida Sulca (born 10 July 1987) is a Peruvian long-distance runner. She competed in the senior women's race at the 2019 IAAF World Cross Country Championships held in Aarhus, Denmark. She finished in 71st place.

In 2017, she competed in the senior women's race at the IAAF World Cross Country Championships held in Kampala, Uganda. She finished in 60th place.
