= Athletics at the 2017 Summer Universiade – Women's 5000 metres =

The women's 5000 metres event at the 2017 Summer Universiade was held on 27 August at the Taipei Municipal Stadium.

== Results ==
Rank	Name	Nationality	Time	Notes
1st place, gold medalist(s)	Hanna Klein	Germany	15:45.28	
2nd place, silver medalist(s)	Jessica O'Connell	Canada	15:50.96	
3rd place, bronze medalist(s)	Jessica Judd	Great Britain	15:51.19	
4	Louise Small	Great Britain	15:55.55	
5	Paulina Kaczyńska	Poland	15:58.48	
6	Kristiina Maki	Czech Republic	15:59.87	SB
7	Emma Mitchell	Ireland	16:00.02	
8	Sanjivani Babur Jadhav	India	16:00.06	
9	Kesaoleboga Molotsane	South Africa	16:01.76	PB
10	Ai Hosoda	Japan	16:05.66	
11	Shona Heaslip	Ireland	16:09.62	PB
12	Matea Parlov	Croatia	16:20.91	PB
13	Andreea Alina Piscu	Romania	16:22.86	PB
14	Natsuki Sekiya	Japan	16:26.36	
15	Hannah Miller	New Zealand	16:26.74	
16	Emine Hatun Tuna	Turkey	16:42.66	
17	Fabiola Uwimana	Rwanda	28:32.90	
	Annet Chebet	Uganda	DNS	

Official Video
