= Alberte Kjær Pedersen =

Danish long-distance runner (born 1998)

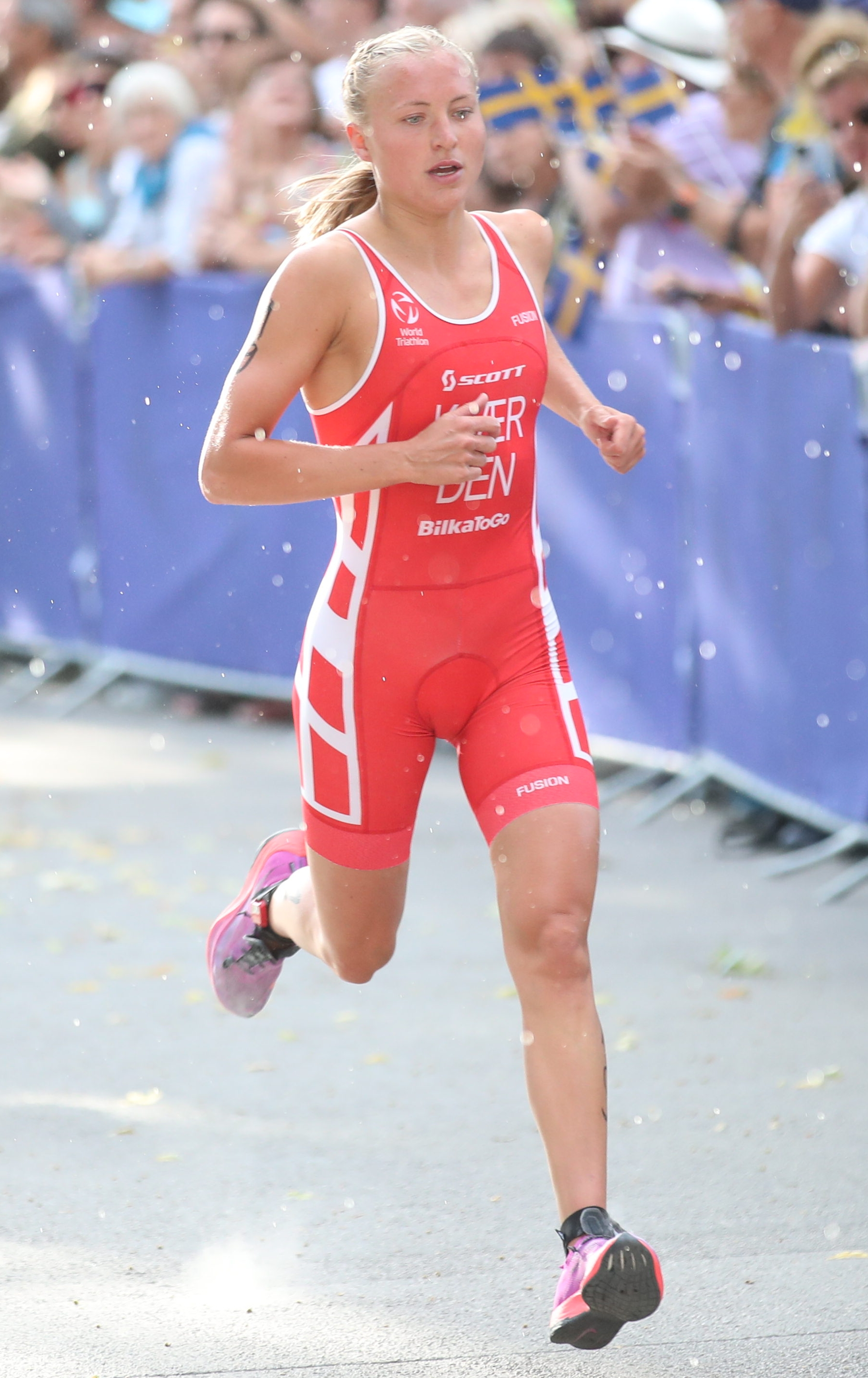

Personal information
- Born: 23 June 1998 (age 27)

Sport
- Country: Denmark
- Sport: Long-distance running

Alberte Kjær Pedersen (born 23 June 1998) is a Danish long-distance runner. She competed in the senior women's race at the 2019 IAAF World Cross Country Championships held in Aarhus, Denmark. She finished in 80th place.

She competed at the 2023 European Games held in Poland. She also competed in the women's triathlon at the 2024 Summer Olympics in Paris, France.
