= Desi Mokonin =

Bahraini long-distance runner

Personal information
- Nationality: Bahraini
- Born: 12 July 1997 (age 28)

Sport
- Sport: Long-distance running
- Event: 10,000 metres

Desi Mokonin (born in Ethiopia, 12 July 1997) is a Bahraini long-distance runner. She competed in the women's 10,000 metres at the 2017 World Championships in Athletics, placing 15th in 31:55.34. In 2019, she competed in the senior women's race at the 2019 IAAF World Cross Country Championships held in Aarhus, Denmark. She finished in 28th place.
