= Anna Kelly =

Irish journalist

- Born: Annie Christina Fitzsimmons; 8 January 1891; Ballysadare, County Sligo, Ireland
- Died: 14 June 1958 (aged 67); Dublin

Anna Kelly (8 January 1891 – 14 June 1958) was an Irish journalist and the first women's page editor in Ireland.

== Early life ==
Anna Kelly was born Annie Christina Fitzsimmons in Ballysadare, County Sligo on 8 January 1891. She was one of the four children of James Fitzsimmons, RIC constable and later a farmer, and Mary Fitzsimmons (née McDonald). She had two brothers and one sister. Later in life both Kelly and her brothers changed the spelling of their surname to Fitzsimons. Kelly attended a convent school before moving to Dublin around 1910 to take up temporary secretarial jobs with an employment agency.

== Career ==
One of her first jobs was as a typist and stenographer to George Moore, who raised her wages to £2 a week from the 10s. paid by the agency. Through Moore she was introduced to a number of prominent figures in the Irish literary revival, and also worked for the publishing house, Maunsel and Roberts. Despite her family's disapproval, Kelly was a member of Cumann na mBan, serving in the GPO in the Easter Rising. She joined the office staff of Sinn Féin in their headquarters at 6 Harcourt Street, Dublin in 1917 and continued working in various roles including the Propaganda/Publicity Department until long after the end of the Irish Civil War. There, she worked as secretary and general assistant to Patrick O'Keeffe, the party's general secretary. In this role she was the minute taker at numerous meetings including the party's central council. For the inaugural sitting of the first Dáil Éireann on 21 January 1919, she prepared notes. She later served as a secretary to Michael Collins, preparing briefings for foreign correspondents, typed and mimeographed the news sheet of the Dáil department of publicity, and assisting in the collating and composing Irish Bulletin from 1919 to 1921. She did all of this during the dangerous and underground times of the Irish War of Independence. Throughout this time she was known as "Miss Fitz", retaining the lifelong nicknames of "Fitz" and "Fitzie". During the Irish Civil War she worked on the Republican War News, an anti-treaty publication, which led to her arrest by Free State authorities in late 1922. She was imprisoned in Mountjoy, then Kilmainham where she went on hunger strike, and then the North Dublin Union from which she escaped with a number of fellow female prisoners, but was rearrested in May 1923. After the ceasefire, she was released.

Kelly had been working as a freelance journalist throughout the 1920s. When The Irish Press was launched in 1931, Kelly was on the staff as the first women's page editor in Ireland. She wrote features and had a regular column, Kelly's corner, reviewing social events. She was a roving reporter in the southern counties, writing a popular series of wry profiles of villages and towns in the early 1930s. Kelly would travel to Geneva frequently to cover meetings of the League of Nations, working as an informal aide to de Valera's Irish delegation. In 1935, Kelly resigned from the Press to protest the departure of the editorial chair, Frank Gallagher, but returned. She visited Germany in 1938, where she interviewed Adolf Hitler. Kelly was reprimanded for her gentle mocking in an account of one of presidents Douglas Hyde's garden parties, comparing the president's mustache with "certain inhabitants of the next door zoo". Kelly became disillusioned with de Valera's policies, firstly over the executions of IRA volunteers in the early 1940s. She was fired from the Press after she wrote an attack on the Fianna Fáil government of 1951 to 1954. She went on to work for other papers including the Sunday Express. During the Big Freeze of 1947, Kelly visited a tenement district in Dublin to stand in a fuel queue to report first hand the suffering of people in the unusually cold weather. One of the leaders at Sinn Féin headquarters (Robert Brennan) remembered "Miss Fitz" as one of the wittiest conversationists I have known."

== Family ==
During the truce, she married a fellow member of the Sinn Féin headquarters staff, Francis M. Kelly known as Frank, on 23 July 1921. He was a friend of Pádraic Ó Conaire and Collins, who recruited him to the Gaelic League, and possibly the IRB. As a member of the Irish Volunteers "Kimmage garrison", he served in the GPO in 1916 and was later interned. In February 1919, he helped Collins in the escape of Éamon de Valera from Lincoln jail, and his subsequent escape to the United States. He was opposed to the treaty, editing the Republican War News briefly before being captured and interned. He was an artist, drawing sketch portraits of many of the high-profile figures of the time. After the Civil War, the Kellys had a poultry farm in Bray, County Wicklow for a time. In 1932, Frank became a civil servant in the Department of Local Government and Public Health under a Fianna Fáil government. The couple had two daughters, Nancy and Ruth. Kelly died of cancer at her home, 17 Rathgar Avenue, on 14 June 1958.
