= Botswana at the African Games =

- IOC code: BOT
- NOC: Botswana National Olympic Committee
- Medals: Gold 20 Silver 17 Bronze 39 Total 76

African Games appearances (overview)
- 1991; 1995; 1999; 2003; 2007; 2011; 2015; 2019; 2023

Botswana (BOT) has competed in the last eight African Games, first appearing in 1991. Athletes from Botswana have won a total of 76 medals, including twenty gold.

== Competitors ==
Botswana has sent competitors to every African Games since 1991. Amongst the competitors are multiple gold medal winners Amantle Montsho, Isaac Makwala and Kabelo Kgosiemang. Montsho was the country's first internationally successful athlete when she was announced World Champion in 400 metres in 2011 after winning two consecutive Games. Kgosiemang broke the ground record with his jump of 2.27 metres (7 ft 5 in) in 2007, while his second gold medal came some 12 years later in 2015.

== Medal tables ==
=== Medals by Games ===
Botswana first competed in the All-Africa Games in 1991, and immediately started an unbroken streak of awards with a bronze medal for boxing. The country achieved its first gold medal, in the men's high jump, in 2003. Below is a table representing all Botswanan medals won at the Games.

Games	Athletes	Gold	Silver	Bronze	Total	Rank
1991 Cairo		0	0	1	1	28
1995 Harare		0	0	1	1	32
1999 Johannesburg		0	3	2	5	21
2003 Abuja		4	1	6	11	11
2007 Algiers		6	2	5	13	10
2011 Maputo		2	5	9	16	15
2015 Brazzaville		3	3	9	15	17
2019 Rabat		5	3	6	14	13
Total		20	17	39	76	17

== See also ==
- Botswana at the Olympics
- Botswana at the Paralympics
- Sport in Botswana
