= 2024 African Championships in Athletics – Men's high jump =

Men's high jump at the 2024 African Championships in Athletics
- Venue: Japoma Stadium
- Location: Douala, Cameroon
- Dates: 26 June
- Competitors: 14 from 9 nations
- Winning height: 2.18 m

Medalists
gold medal	Brian Raats	South Africa
silver medal	Asbel Kiprop Kemboi	Kenya
silver medal	Saad Hammouda	Morocco

The men's high jump event at the 2024 African Championships in Athletics was held on 26 June in Douala, Cameroon.

== Records ==
Records before the 2024 African Athletics Championships
Record	Athlete (nation)	Height (m)	Location	Date
World record	Javier Sotomayor (CUB)	2.45	Salamanca, Spain	27 July 1993
African record	Jacques Freitag (RSA)	2.38	Oudtshoorn, South Africa	5 March 2005
Championship record	Abderrahmane Hammad (ALG)	2.34	Algiers, Algeria	14 July 2000
Championship record	Kabelo Kgosiemang (BOT)	2.34	Addis Ababa, Ethiopia	4 May 2008
World leading	Gianmarco Tamberi (ITA)	2.37	Rome, Italy	11 June 2024
African leading	Brian Raats (RSA)	2.25	Potchefstroom, South Africa	14 March 2024

== Results ==
Rank	Athlete	Nationality	1.90	1.95	2.00	2.05	2.10	2.15	2.18	2.21	Result	Notes
1st place, gold medalist(s)	Brian Raats	South Africa	–	–	–	xo	o	o	o	xxx	2.18	
2nd place, silver medalist(s)	Asbel Kiprop Kemboi	Kenya	o	o	o	o	o	xxo	xxx		2.15	
2nd place, silver medalist(s)	Saad Hammouda	Morocco	–	–	–	o	o	xxo	xxx		2.15	
4	Breyton Poole	South Africa	–	–	o	o	xxo	xxx			2.10	
5	François Moudio	Cameroon	o	–	o	o	xx–	x			2.05	
5	Duop Lim Koung	Ethiopia	o	o	o	o	xxx				2.05	
5	Cadman Yamoah	Ghana	–	–	–	o	xxx				2.05	
8	Kennedy Ocansey	Ghana	–	–	o	xo	xxx				2.05	
9	Freddy Oyono	Cameroon	o	o	o	xxo	xxx				2.05	
10	Tshwanelo Aabobe	Botswana	–	o	o	xxx					2.00	
10	Raphael Moudoulou	Cameroon	–	–	o	x–	xx				2.00	
10	Prosper Dezardin	Mauritius	–	–	o	xxx					2.00	
13	Mal Gony Win	Ethiopia	xxo	xxx							1.90	
	Liam Barbe	Seychelles	xxx								NM	

== See also ==
- Athletics at the 2023 African Games – Men's high jump
