= Sudan at the 2019 African Games =

- Flag of Sudan
- IOC code: SUD
- NOC: Sudan Olympic Committee

in Rabat, Morocco 19 August 2019 – 31 August 2019
- Competitors: 28 (23 men and 5 women) in 9 sports
- Medals: Gold 0 Silver 0 Bronze 0 Total 0

African Games appearances (overview)
- 1965; 1973; 1978; 1987–1999; 2003; 2007; 2011; 2015; 2019; 2023

Sudan competed at the 2019 African Games held from 19 to 31 August 2019 in Rabat, Morocco. The country competed in nine sports and did not win a medal.

== Archery ==
Abdelrahman Alyan, Mahmoud Elkhalifa and Mujahid Ibrahim competed in archery in the men's individual recurve and men's team recurve events.

== Athletics ==
Four athletes represented Sudan in athletics.

Sadam Koumi competed in the men's 400 metres event. He reached the semifinals and did not qualify to compete in the final.

Tasabih Mahdi competed in the women's 400 metres event. She was also scheduled to compete in the women's 400 metres hurdles event but she did not start.

Abdelmunaim Abdalla competed in the men's 5000 metres event. He finished in 20th place.

Ali Mohd Younes Idriss competed in the men's high jump event. He finished in 8th place.

== Canoeing ==
Khalid Omar, Elazza Mohamed and Badwi Mohamed represented Sudan in canoeing.

== Judo ==
Three athletes represented Sudan in judo.

Athlete	Event	Round of 32	Round of 16	Quarterfinals	Semifinals	Repechage 1	Final / BM	
Athlete	Event	Opposition Result	Opposition Result	Opposition Result	Opposition Result	Opposition Result	Opposition Result	Rank
Mohamed Abdalrasool	Men's -73 kg	Mawesi (COD); L	did not advance					
Mohamed Elmojtaba Ahmed	Men's -81 kg	Ali (TAN); W	Franck Parisi (CMR); L	did not advance				
Youssef Alaraj	Men's -60 kg	Terkpor (GHA); L	did not advance					

== Snooker ==
Mina Samuel competed in snooker. He competed in the Men's Individual tournament.

His opponent did not start at two matches and he lost both of his other matches (against Mohamed Alakrady representing Egypt and Yassine Bellamine representing Morocco).

== Taekwondo ==
Five athletes represented Sudan in Taekwondo.

Athlete	Event	Round of 32	Round of 16	Quarterfinals	Semifinals	Final	
Athlete	Event	Opposition Result	Opposition Result	Opposition Result	Opposition Result	Opposition Result	Rank
Ahmed Mohamed	Men's –54 kg	—	Elharmazi (MAR); L 2–25	did not advance			
Muhailm Ibrahim	Men's –58 kg	Obonyo (KEN); L 3–14	did not advance				

== Volleyball ==
Two doubles competed in beach volleyball:

- Muzamil Ateya and Nagi Osman (men's tournament)
- Fatma Dawoud and Ebtisam Rakhis (women's tournament)

== Weightlifting ==
Zikryat Khojali and Mohamed Zaid competed in weightlifting.

Khojali competed in the women's 76 kg event and Zaid competed in the men's 81 kg event.

== Wrestling ==
Ali Bakhet, Guma Bashir and Mustafa Ali represented Sudan in wrestling.
