= Botswana at the 2003 All-Africa Games =

- IOC code: BOT
- NOC: Botswana National Olympic Committee

in Abuja 5 October 2003 – 17 October 2003
- Medals Ranked 11th: Gold 4 Silver 1 Bronze 6 Total 11

All-Africa Games appearances
- 1991; 1995; 1999; 2003; 2007; 2011; 2015; 2019; 2023

Youth appearances
- 2010; 2014

Botswana competed in the 2003 All-Africa Games held at the National Stadium in the city of Abuja, Nigeria. The team came eleventh overall with eleven medals, nearly half of them in karate including a gold for Thabiso Maretlwaneng. The award ceremony for the men's high jump was memorable for featuring an impromptu solo rendition of Botswana's national anthem by the winner, Kabelo Mmono.

== Competition ==
The 2003 All-Africa Games were held in Nigeria. Events took place at the National Stadium constructed in the city of Abuja for the event. Botswana entered twelve events at the games, eight for men and four women. Although she did not win a medal, Amantle Montsho ran her first race during the games. The award ceremony for the high jump was memorable for featuring an impromptu solo rendition of the national anthem by the winner, Kabelo Mmono. This was swiftly followed by a victory for the men's 4 x 400 metres relay team, which won with a time of 3:02.24, a national record. It was the fourth time the country had competed in the games.

== Medal summary ==
The country won a tally of eleven medals, consisting of four gold, one silver and six bronze. The country ranked eleventh in the medal table.

=== Medal table ===
Sport	Gold	Silver	Bronze	Total
Athletics	2	0	0	2
Chess	0	0	2	2
Karate	1	1	3	5
Total	4	1	6	11

== List of Medalists ==
=== Gold Medal ===
Medal	Name	Sport	Event	Date	Ref
Gold	Kabelo Mmono	Athletics	Men's high jump	15 October	
Gold	California Molefe; Kagiso Kilego; Oganeditse Moseki; Johnson Kubisa	Athletics	Men's 4 x 400 relay	15 October	
Gold	Thabiso Maretlwaneng]	Karate	Men's Up To 60 kg	16 October	

=== Silver Medal ===
Medal	Name	Sport	Event	Date	Ref
Silver	Botswana	Karate	Men's Team Kata	14 October	

=== Bronze Medal ===
Medal	Name	Sport	Event	Date	Ref
Bronze	Boikhotso Modongi	Chess	Women's 1st table	6 October	
Bronze	Tshephiso Lopang	Chess	Women's 2nd table	6 October	
Bronze	Gotseone Mongologa	Karate	Women's Up To 60 kg.	16 October	
Bronze	Thabiso Maretlwaneng	Karate	Men's Individual Kata	14 October	
Bronze	Botswana	Karate	Women's Team Kata	14 October	

== See also ==
- Botswana at the African Games
