= Sudan at the 2015 African Games =

- Flag of Sudan
- IOC code: SUD
- NOC: Sudan Olympic Committee

in Brazzaville, Republic of the Congo 4 September 2015 – 19 September 2015
- Medals: Gold 0 Silver 1 Bronze 0 Total 1

African Games appearances (overview)
- 1965; 1973; 1978; 1987–1999; 2003; 2007; 2011; 2015; 2019; 2023

Sudan competed at the 2015 African Games held in Brazzaville, Republic of the Congo. The country won one silver medal in athletics.

== Medal summary ==
=== Medal table ===
| Medal | Name | Sport | Event | Date |
|---|---|---|---|---|
| Silver | Ali Mohd Younes Idriss | Athletics | Men's high jump | |

== Athletics ==
Ali Mohd Younes Idriss won the silver medal in the men's high jump event.

== Swimming ==
Several swimmers represented Sudan at the 2015 African Games.
