= 2016 African Championships in Athletics – Men's high jump =

The men's high jump event at the 2016 African Championships in Athletics was held on 24 June in Kings Park Stadium.

== Results ==
| Rank | Athlete | Nationality | Result | Notes |
|---|---|---|---|---|
| 1st place, gold medalist(s) | Mathew Sawe | Kenya | 2.21 | |
| 2nd place, silver medalist(s) | Keagan Fourie | South Africa | 2.18 | |
| 3rd place, bronze medalist(s) | Fernand Djoumessi | Cameroon | 2.15 | |
| 4 | Kabelo Kgosiemang | Botswana | 2.10 | |
| 5 | Raoul Matogno Bong | Cameroon | 2.05 | |
| 6 | Amr Kaseb | Egypt | 2.00 | |
| 6 | Chris Moleya | South Africa | 2.00 | |
| 8 | Garth Ellis | South Africa | 2.00 | |
| 9 | Sydney Nyoni | Zimbabwe | 1.90 | |
| | Gobe Takobana | Botswana | NM | |
| | Jean-Paul Masanga-Mekombo | Democratic Republic of the Congo | DNS | |
| | Lemi Argecho | Ethiopia | DNS | |
| | Mohamed Idris | Sudan | DNS | |
