= Kabelo Mmono =

Botswana high jumper

Medal record

Men's athletics

Representing Botswana

African Championships
Gold medal – first place	2004 Brazzaville	High jump
Silver medal – second place	2002 Radès	High jump

Kabelo Mmono (born 4 February 1980) is a high jumper from Botswana. He won gold medals at the All-Africa Games and the African Championships in Athletics. When he won gold representing Botswana at the 2003 All-Africa Games, his medal ceremony was memorable for his impromptu solo rendition of the national anthem.

He is a former national record holder with 2.20 metres, but in 2006 this record was beaten by Kabelo Kgosiemang.

== International competitions ==
Year	Competition	Venue	Position	Notes
Representing Botswana
1998	World Junior Championships	Annecy, France	30th (q)	1.95 m
1999	African Junior Championships	Tunis, Tunisia	1st	2.05 m
2002	African Championships	Radès, Tunisia	2nd	2.10 m
2003	All-Africa Games	Abuja, Nigeria	1st	2.15 m
2004	African Championships	Brazzaville, Republic of the Congo	1st	2.17 m
