= 2022 African Championships in Athletics – Men's high jump =

The men's high jump event at the 2022 African Championships in Athletics was held on 12 June in Port Louis, Mauritius.

== Results ==
Rank	Athlete	Nationality	1.90	1.95	2.00	2.05	2.10	2.15	2.20	Result	Notes
1st place, gold medalist(s)	Hichem Bouhanoune	Algeria	–	–	–	o	o	xo	xxx	2.15	
2nd place, silver medalist(s)	Mike Edward	Nigeria	xo	o	o	o	o	xo	xxx	2.15	
3rd place, bronze medalist(s)	Mpho Links	South Africa	–	–	o	o	o	xxo	xxx	2.15	
4	Tshwanelo Aabobe	Botswana	–	–	o	o	o	xxx		2.10	
5	Brian Raats	South Africa	–	–	o	o	xo	xxx		2.10	
6	Kudakwashe Chadenga	Zimbabwe	–	–	o	xxo	xxx			2.05	
6	Matthew Sawe	Kenya	–	–	–	xxo	xxx			2.05	
8	Dezardin Prosper	Mauritius	o	o	o	xxx				2.00	
9	Mohamed Aboutaleb	Egypt	o	xo	o	xxx				2.00	
10	Asbel Kiprop Kemboi	Kenya	o	xo	xo	xxx				2.00	
11	Elca Charles Ambourouet	Gabon	o	xx–	x					1.90	
	Thuto Blessing Mothomme	Botswana	xxx							NM	
	David Aya	Nigeria								DNS	
	Joel Tshikamba	Democratic Republic of the Congo								DNS	
	Jean Paul Masanga	Democratic Republic of the Congo								DNS	
	Lognou Onadja	Burkina Faso								DNS	
