= Karate at the 2005 World Games – Men's kumite 60 kg =

Men's kumite 60 kg at the 2005 World Games
- Venue: Kfraftzentrale
- Date: 24 July 2005
- Competitors: 7 from 7 nations

Medalists
1st place, gold medalist(s)		(Italy) Michele Giuliani
2nd place, silver medalist(s)		(Russia) Yury Kalashnikov
3rd place, bronze medalist(s)		(Venezuela) Miguel Yépez

The men's kumite 60 kg competition in karate at the 2005 World Games took place on 24 July 2005 at the Kfraftzentrale in Duisburg, Germany.

== Competition format ==
A total of 7 athletes entered the competition. In elimination round they fought in two groups. From this stage the best two athletes qualifies to the semifinals.

== Results ==
=== Elimination round ===
==== Group A ====
Rank	Athlete	B	W	D	L	Pts	Score
1	Yury Kalashnikov (RUS)	2	2	0	0	4	9–0
2	Dean Marshall (AUS)	2	1	0	1	2	5–8
3	Adam Brozer (USA)	2	0	0	2	0	4–10

	Score	
Yury Kalashnikov (RUS)	4–0	Dean Marshall (AUS)
Yury Kalashnikov (RUS)	5–0	Adam Brozer (USA)
Dean Marshall (AUS)	5–4	Adam Brozer (USA)

==== Group B ====
Rank	Athlete	B	W	D	L	Pts	Score
1	Michele Giuliani (ITA)	3	3	0	0	6	19–8
2	Miguel Yépez (VEN)	3	2	0	1	4	12–2
3	Artur Aslanyan (ARM)	3	1	0	2	2	11–13
4	Thabiso Maretlwaneng (BOT)	3	0	0	3	0	1–17

	Score	
Miguel Yépez (VEN)	8–0	Michele Giuliani (ITA)
Thabiso Maretlwaneng (BOT)	1–6	Artur Aslanyan (ARM)
Miguel Yépez (VEN)	3–0	Thabiso Maretlwaneng (BOT)
Michele Giuliani (ITA)	11–3	Artur Aslanyan (ARM)
Miguel Yépez (VEN)	1–2	Artur Aslanyan (ARM)
Michele Giuliani (ITA)	8–0	Thabiso Maretlwaneng (BOT)

=== Finals ===
Semifinals
Yury Kalashnikov (RUS)	5
Miguel Yépez (VEN)	3
Michele Giuliani (ITA)	4
Dean Marshall (AUS)	1

Final
Yury Kalashnikov (RUS)	2
Michele Giuliani (ITA)	7
Third place
Miguel Yépez (VEN)	2
Dean Marshall (AUS)	1
