= 2010 African Championships in Athletics – Men's high jump =

2010 African athletics competition

The men's high jump at the 2010 African Championships in Athletics was held on August 1.

== Results ==
Rank	Athlete	Nationality	1.95	2.00	2.05	2.10	2.15	2.19	2.25	Result	Notes
1st place, gold medalist(s)	Kabelo Kgosiemang	Botswana	–	–	–	o	–	o	xxx	2.19	
2nd place, silver medalist(s)	Bong Matogno	Cameroon	–	–	o	o	o	xxx		2.15	SB
3rd place, bronze medalist(s)	Fernand Djoumessi	Cameroon	–	–	–	–	xo	xxx		2.15	
3rd place, bronze medalist(s)	Mohamed Idris	Sudan	–	–	–	o	xo	xxx		2.15	
5	William Woodcock	Seychelles	–	–	o	o	xxo	xxx		2.15	
6	Karim Samir Lotfy	Egypt	–	–	o	xxx				2.05	
6	Jah Bennett	Liberia	o	o	o	xxx				2.05	
8	Ulika Bravo da Costa	Angola	–	o	xo	xxx				2.05	
9	Amos Kipngetich	Kenya	xo	xxo	xo	xxx				2.05	SB
10	Mathew Kiplagat	Kenya	–	–	xxo	xxx				2.05	SB
11	Elijah Chesoen	Kenya	o	xo	xxx					2.00	
12	Wigan Mwiinga	Zambia	xxo	xxx						1.95	
	Garwech Hoth	Ethiopia	xxx							NM	
	Bayo Adio	Nigeria								DNS	
	Hichem Krim	Algeria								DNS	
