= 2014 Commonwealth rankings in athletics =

Commonwealth rankings in Athletics – 2014 lists the Top 10 Commonwealth athletes in each event included in the 2014 Commonwealth Games for the Calendar year 2014. Only outdoor performances are included. Rankings are based on a maximum of 3 athletes per country, athletes with a superior performance than the 10th ranked athlete but are not in the top 3 from their country are listed in italics. Athletes who are ineligible to compete at the Commonwealth Games are excluded.

Competed in the event listed at the 2014 Commonwealth Games
Performance at the 2014 Commonwealth Games

== 100 metres ==
Men
#	Athlete	Country	Performance	Venue	Date
1	Richard Thompson	Trinidad and Tobago	9.82	Trinidad and Tobago Port of Spain	20 June 2014
2	Kemarley Brown	Jamaica	9.93	United States Walnut	17 May 2014
3	Chijindu Ujah	England	9.96	Netherlands Hengelo	8 June 2014
3	Nesta Carter	Jamaica	9.96	Sweden Stockholm	21 August 2014
3	Kemar Bailey-Cole	Jamaica	9.96	Switzerland Zurich	28 August 2014
6	Nickel Ashmeade	Jamaica	9.97	Great Britain Glasgow	11 July 2014
7	Simon Magakwe	South Africa	9.98A	South Africa Pretoria	12 April 2014
7	Usain Bolt	Jamaica	9.98	Poland Warsaw	23 August 2014
9	Keston Bledman	Trinidad and Tobago	10.00	Trinidad and Tobago Port of Spain	20 June 2014
9	James Dasaolu	England	10.00	Belgium Brussels	5 September 2014

Women
#	Athlete	Country	Performance	Venue	Date
1	Michelle-Lee Ahye	Trinidad and Tobago	10.85	Trinidad and Tobago Port of Spain	21 June 2014
1	Blessing Okagbare	Nigeria	10.85	Great Britain Glasgow	28 July 2014
3	Veronica Campbell-Brown	Jamaica	10.86	United States Clermont	7 June 2014
4	Samantha Henry-Robinson	Jamaica	11.00	United States Clermont	26 April 2014
5	Shelly-Ann Fraser-Pryce	Jamaica	11.01	Monaco Monaco	18 July 2014
	Kerron Stewart	Jamaica	11.02	Jamaica Kingston	27 June 2014
	Remona Burchell	Jamaica	11.03	United States Jacksonville	30 May 2014
	Natasha Morrison	Jamaica	11.06	Jamaica Kingston	27 June 2014
	Schillonie Calvert	Jamaica	11.08	Jamaica Kingston	27 June 2014
	Simone Facey	Jamaica	11.09	United States Clermont	10 May 2014
	Carrie Russell	Jamaica	11.10	Italy Rieti	7 September 2014
6	Melissa Breen	Australia	11.11	Australia Canberra	9 February 2014
7	Dina Asher-Smith	England	11.14	Germany Mannheim	5 July 2014
8	Gloria Asumnu	Nigeria	11.15	United States Calabar	19 June 2014
	Aleen Bailey	Jamaica	11.16	United States Clermont	31 May 2014
9	Bianca Williams	England	11.17	Switzerland Geneva	15 June 2014
10	Asha Philip	England	11.18	Great Britain Glasgow	28 July 2014

== 200 metres ==
Men
#	Athlete	Country	Performance	Venue	Date
1	Warren Weir	Jamaica	19.82	United States New York	13 June 2014
2	Nickel Ashmeade	Jamaica	19.95	United States New York	13 June 2014
3	Isaac Makwala	Botswana	19.96	Switzerland La Chaux-de-Fonds	6 July 2014
4	Adam Gemili	England	19.98	Switzerland Zurich	15 August 2014
5	Rasheed Dwyer	Jamaica	20.04	Jamaica Kingston	29 June 2014
6	Antoine Adams	Saint Kitts and Nevis	20.08	Saint Kitts and Nevis Basseterre	22 June 2014
7	Aaron Brown	Canada	20.16	United States Fayetteville	31 May 2014
8	Carvin Nkanata	Kenya	20.17	United States Knoxville	12 April 2014
9	Wayde van Niekerk	South Africa	20.19	Switzerland Lausanne	3 July 2014
10	Rondel Sorrillo	Trinidad and Tobago	20.22	United States Clermont	7 June 2014

Women
#	Athlete	Country	Performance	Venue	Date
1	Blessing Okagbare	Nigeria	22.23	United States Eugene	31 May 2014
2	Jodie Williams	England	22.46	Switzerland Zurich	15 August 2014
3	Anthonique Strachan	Bahamas	22.50	China Shanghai	18 May 2014
4	Shelly-Ann Fraser-Pryce	Jamaica	22.53	Jamaica Kingston	3 May 2014
5	Bianca Williams	England	22.58	Great Britain Glasgow	31 July 2014
6	Dina Asher-Smith	England	22.61	Switzerland Zurich	12 August 2014
7	Anyika Onuora	England	22.64	Great Britain Glasgow	31 July 2014
8	Simone Facey	Jamaica	22.67	China Beijing	21 May 2014
9	Anneisha McLaughlin	Jamaica	22.68	Great Britain Glasgow	31 July 2014
10	Michelle-Lee Ahye	Trinidad and Tobago	22.77	Trinidad and Tobago Port of Spain	22 June 2014

== 400 metres ==
Men
#	Athlete	Country	Performance	Venue	Date
1	Kirani James	Grenada	43.74	Switzerland Lausanne	3 July 2014
2	Isaac Makwala	Botswana	44.01	Switzerland La Chaux-de-Fonds	6 July 2014
3	Deon Lendore	Trinidad and Tobago	44.36	United States Lexington	18 May 2014
4	Wayde van Niekerk	South Africa	44.38	United States New York	14 June 2014
5	Chris Brown	Bahamas	44.59	Switzerland Lausanne	3 July 2014
6	Martyn Rooney	England	44.71	Switzerland Zurich	15 August 2014
7	Matthew Hudson-Smith	England	44.75	Switzerland Zurich	15 August 2014
8	Lalonde Gordon	Trinidad and Tobago	44.78	Great Britain Glasgow	30 July 2014
9	Jarrin Solomon	Trinidad and Tobago	44.98	Belgium Heusden-Zolder	19 July 2014
10	Javon Francis	Jamaica	45.00	Jamaica Kingston	29 March 2014
10	Akheem Gauntlet	Jamaica	45.00	Jamaica Kingston	29 June 2014

Women
#	Athlete	Country	Performance	Venue	Date
1	Novlene Williams-Mills	Jamaica	50.05	Jamaica Kingston	29 June 2014
2	Stephanie McPherson	Jamaica	50.12	Belgium Brussels	5 September 2014
3	Christine Day	Jamaica	50.16	Jamaica Kingston	29 June 2014
4	Amantle Montsho	Botswana	50.37	China Shanghai	18 May 2014
	Anastasia Le-Roy	Jamaica	50.84	Jamaica Kingston	29 June 2014
5	Munpopo Kabange	Zambia	50.87	Morocco Marrakech	13 September 2014
	Kaliese Spencer	Jamaica	51.00	China Shanghai	18 May 2014
6	Folasade Abugan	Nigeria	51.21	Great Britain Loughborough	19 July 2014
7	Kineke Alexander	Saint Vincent and the Grenadines	51.23	United States San Marcos	26 April 2014
	Shericka Williams	Jamaica	51.23	Jamaica Kingston	29 June 2014
8	Patience Okon George	Nigeria	51.29	Nigeria Warri	13 June 2014
9	Regina George	Nigeria	51.30	Nigeria Calabar	19 June 2014
	Shericka Jackson	Jamaica	51.32	Jamaica Kingston	29 June 2014
10	Christine Ohuruogu	ENG	51.38	Switzerland Zurich	15 August 2014

== 800 metres ==
Men
#	Athlete	Country	Performance	Venue	Date
1	Nijel Amos	Botswana	1:42.54	Monaco Monaco	18 July 2014
2	Ferguson Rotich	Kenya	1:42.84	Monaco Monaco	18 July 2014
3	David Rudisha	Kenya	1:42.98	Monaco Monaco	18 July 2014
4	Asbel Kiprop	Kenya	1:43.34	France Paris	5 July 2014
	Timothy Kitum	Kenya	1:43.65	Belgium Heusden-Zolder	19 July 2014
5	Alex Rowe	Australia	1:44.40	Monaco Monaco	18 July 2014
6	André Olivier	South Africa	1:44.42	France Paris	5 July 2014
	Job Kinyor	Kenya	1:44.55	Italy Rieti	7 September 2014
	Robert Kiptoo Biwott	Kenya	1:44.69	China Shanghai	18 May 2014
	Anthony Chemut	Kenya	1:44.72	Belgium Heusden-Zolder	19 July 2014
	Jeremiah Mutai	Kenya	1:44.85	China Shanghai	18 May 2014
7	Ronald Musagala	Uganda	1:45.27	Netherlands Hengelo	8 June 2014
8	Brandon McBride	Canada	1:45.35	United States Walnut	19 April 2014
	Eliud Kipngetich Rutto	Kenya	1:45.37	United States Palo Alto	4 May 2014
9	Andrew Osagie	England	1:45.37	United States Eugene	31 May 2014
10	Joshua Ralph	Australia	1:45.81	Australia Melbourne	22 March 2014

Women
#	Athlete	Country	Performance	Venue	Date
1	Eunice Jepkoech Sum	Kenya	1:57.92	Monaco Monaco	18 July 2014
2	Winnie Nanyondo	Uganda	1:58.63	Monaco Monaco	18 July 2014
3	Janeth Jepkosgei	Kenya	1:58.70	Monaco Monaco	18 July 2014
4	Lynsey Sharp	Scotland	1:58.80	Switzerland Zurich	15 August 2014
5	Agatha Kimaswai	Kenya	1:59.51	Italy Rieti	7 September 2014
6	Melissa Bishop	Canada	1:59.70	Canada Victoria	8 July 2014
7	Jessica Judd	England	1:59.77	Norway Oslo	11 June 2014
8	Alison Leonard	England	2:00.08	Great Britain Glasgow	12 July 2014
9	Natoya Goule	Jamaica	2:00.28	United States New York	14 June 2014
10	Jenny Meadows	England	2:00.32	Great Britain Glasgow	12 July 2014

== 1500 metres ==
Men
#	Athlete	Country	Performance	Venue	Date
1	Silas Kiplagat	Kenya	3:27.46	Monaco Monaco	18 July 2014
2	Asbel Kiprop	Kenya	3:28.45	Monaco Monaco	18 July 2014
3	Ronald Kwemoi	Kenya	3:28.81	Monaco Monaco	18 July 2014
4	Nick Willis	New Zealand	3:29.91	Monaco Monaco	18 July 2014
	James Magut	Kenya	3:30.61	Qatar Doha	9 May 2014
	Bethwell Birgen	Kenya	3:31.22	Qatar Doha	9 May 2014
	Vincent Kibet	Kenya	3:31.96	Italy Rieti	7 September 2014
	Collins Cheboi	Kenya	3:32.00	Italy Rieti	7 September 2014
5	Johan Cronje	South Africa	3:33.31	Qatar Doha	9 May 2014
6	Zane Robertson	New Zealand	3:34.19	Italy Rieti	7 September 2014
	Nixon Chepseba	Kenya	3:34.64	Qatar Doha	9 May 2014
	Elijah Menengoi	Kenya	3:35.0A	Kenya Nairobi	7 June 2014
7	Chris O'Hare	Scotland	3:35.06	Great Britain Glasgow	12 July 2014
8	Jake Wightman	Scotland	3:35.49	Great Britain Glasgow	12 July 2014
9	Charlie Grice	England	3:35.59	Great Britain Glasgow	12 July 2014
	Vincent Mutai	Kenya	3:35.63	Belgium Heusden-Zolder	19 July 2014
	Elijah Kiptoo	Kenya	3:35.81	Italy Bellinzona	3 June 2014
10	Ryan Gregson	Australia	3:36.17	United States Los Angeles	15 May 2014

Women
#	Athlete	Country	Performance	Venue	Date
1	Hellen Obiri	Kenya	3:57.05	United States Eugene	31 May 2014
2	Faith Kipyegon	Kenya	3:58.01	United States Eugene	31 May 2014
3	Laura Muir	Scotland	4:00.07	France Paris	5 July 2014
4	Laura Weightman	England	4:00.17	France Paris	5 July 2014
5	Viola Kibiwott	Kenya	4:01.31	China Shanghai	18 May 2014
	Eunice Jepkoech Sum	Kenya	4:01.54	United States Eugene	31 May 2014
	Perine Nengampi	Kenya	4:03.98	Belgium Heusden-Zolder	19 July 2014
	Irene Jelagat	Kenya	4:04.07	United States New York	13 June 2014
6	Zoe Buckman	Australia	4:04.09	United States Eugene	31 May 2014
7	Nicole Sifuentes	Canada	4:04.87	France Paris	5 July 2014
8	Nikki Hamblin	New Zealand	4:05.08	Great Britain Glasgow	28 July 2014
	Anne Mwangi	Kenya	4:05.23	Belgium Heusden-Zolder	19 July 2014
9	Hannah England	England	4:05.27	Netherlands Hengelo	8 June 2014
10	Kate van Buskirk	Canada	4:05.38	Belgium Heusden-Zolder	19 July 2014

== 5000 metres ==
Men
#	Athlete	Country	Performance	Venue	Date
1	Thomas Longosiwa	Kenya	12:56.16	Sweden Stockholm	21 August 2014
2	Caleb Ndiku	Kenya	12:59.17	Sweden Stockholm	21 August 2014
3	Edwin Soi	Kenya	12:59.82	France Paris	5 July 2014
	Paul Kipngetich Tanui	Kenya	13:00.53	France Paris	5 July 2014
	Lawi Lalang	Kenya	13:03.85	France Paris	5 July 2014
	Augustine Choge	Kenya	13:06.12	Germany Berlin	30 August 2014
	Isaiah Koech	Kenya	13:07.55	China Shanghai	18 May 2014
	John Kipkoech	Kenya	13:07.60	Germany Berlin	30 August 2014
	Cornelius Kangogo	Kenya	13:11.14	China Shanghai	18 May 2014
4	Andy Vernon	England	13:11.50	United States Palo Alto	4 May 2014
	Jonathon Muia Ndiku	Kenya	13:12.94	China Shanghai	18 May 2014
	Kenneth Kipkemoi	Kenya	13:13.16	Belgium Heusden-Zolder	19 July 2014
5	Zane Robertson	New Zealand	13:14.69	Germany Berlin	30 August 2014
	Emmanuel Bett	Kenya	13:14.91	Great Britain Glasgow	11 July 2014
6	Cameron Levins	Canada	13:15.38	Great Britain Glasgow	11 July 2014
	Samuel Chelanga	Kenya	13:16.24	Germany Berlin	30 August 2014
	Vincent Rono	Kenya	13:16.42	Morocco Marrakech	8 June 2014
	Joseph Kitur Kiplimo	Kenya	13:17.49	Great Britain Glasgow	27 July 2014
	James Mwangi	Kenya	13:18.35	Japan Hiroshima	29 April 2014
7	Collis Birmingham	Australia	13:18.57	United States Los Angeles	11 May 2014
8	Mohammed Ahmed	Canada	13:18.88	Great Britain Glasgow	27 July 2014
	Bernard Kimani	Kenya	13:18.92	Japan Yokohama	27 April 2014
	Moses Letoyie	Kenya	13:19.26	China Shanghai	18 May 2014
9	Nick Willis	New Zealand	13:20.33	United States Los Angeles	11 May 2014
	Ronald Kwemoi	Kenya	13:21.53	Japan Nobeoka	10 May 2014
10	Tom Farrell	England	13:22.27	United States Palo Alto	4 May 2014

Women
#	Athlete	Country	Performance	Venue	Date
1	Viola Kibiwott	Kenya	14:33.73	Monaco Monaco	18 July 2014
2	Sally Kipyego	Kenya	14:37.18	Monaco Monaco	18 July 2014
3	Betsy Saina	Kenya	14:39.49	Monaco Monaco	18 July 2014
	Mercy Cherono	Kenya	14:43.11	Italy Rome	5 June 2014
	Janet Kisa	Kenya	14:52.59	Italy Rome	5 June 2014
	Agnes Tirop	Kenya	15:00.19	Italy Rome	5 June 2014
	Irene Jelagat	Kenya	15:01.73	Italy Rome	5 June 2014
4	Jo Pavey	England	15:04.87	Italy Rome	5 June 2014
5	Emelia Gorecka	England	15:07:45	United States Palo Alto	5 May 2014
	Margaret Wangari Muriuki	Kenya	15:10.38	Italy Rome	1 August 2014
6	Julia Bleasdale	England	15:11.68	Italy Rome	5 June 2014
7	Jessica O'Connell	Canada	15:13.21	United States Palo Alto	5 May 2014
8	Eloise Wellings	Australia	15:14.99	Great Britain Glasgow	2 August 2014
	Stacey Ndiwa	Kenya	15:15.14	Switzerland Luzern	15 July 2014
	Sally Chepyego	Kenya	15:15.80	Japan Hiroshima	29 April 2014
	Peril Nengampi	Kenya	15:16.50	Belgium Liege	16 July 2014
9	Laura Whittle	Scotland	15:20.92	Switzerland Luzern	15 July 2014
10	Lucy van Dalen	New Zealand	15:22.95	United States Palo Alto	5 May 2014

== 10000 metres ==
Men
#	Athlete	Country	Performance	Venue	Date
1	Paul Tanui	Kenya	26:49.41	United States Eugene	30 May 2014
2	Bedan Karoki	Kenya	26:52.36	United States Eugene	30 May 2014
3	Stephen Sambu	Kenya	26:54.61	United States Eugene	30 May 2014
	Emmanuel Bett	Kenya	27:21.61	United States Eugene	30 May 2014
	William Malel Sitonik	Kenya	27:25.56	Japan Kobe	20 April 2014
	Edward Waweru	Kenya	27:26.92	Japan Kobe	20 April 2014
	Kenneth Kipkemoi	Kenya	27:30.94	United States Eugene	30 May 2014
4	Cameron Levins	Canada	27:36.00	United States Palo Alto	4 May 2014
	Shadrack Kipchirchir	Kenya	27:36.79	United States Palo Alto	4 May 2014
	Kennedy Kithuka	Kenya	27:41.73	United States Palo Alto	4 May 2014
5	Timothy Toroitich	Uganda	27:43.27	United States Eugene	30 May 2014

Women
#	Athlete	Country	Performance	Venue	Date
1	Sally Kipyego	Kenya	30:42.26	United States Palo Alto	4 May 2014
2	Betsy Saina	Kenya	30:57.30	United States Palo Alto	4 May 2014
3	Selly Chepyego	Kenya	31:28.07	Japan Kobe	20 April 2014
4	Julia Bleasdale	England	31:42.02	United States Palo Alto	4 May 2014
	Doricah Kerubo	Kenya	31:45.24	United States Palo Alto	4 May 2014
	Joyce Chepkirui	Kenya	32:09.35	Great Britain Glasgow	29 July 2014
	Florence Kiplagat	Kenya	32:09.48	Great Britain Glasgow	29 July 2014
	Emily Chebet	Kenya	32:10.82	Great Britain Glasgow	29 July 2014
5	Jo Pavey	England	32:11.04	Great Britain Highgate	10 May 2014
6	Elinor Kirk	Wales	32:17.05	United States Palo Alto	4 April 2014
7	Lanni Marchant	Canada	32:29.61	United States Palo Alto	4 April 2014
8	Kate Avery	England	32:33.35	Great Britain Glasgow	29 July 2014
9	Beth Potter	Scotland	32:33.36	Great Britain Glasgow	29 July 2014
10	Sonia Samuels	England	32:39.36	United States Palo Alto	4 May 2014

== 110/100 metres hurdles ==
Men
#	Athlete	Country	Performance	Venue	Date
1	Hansle Parchment	Jamaica	12.94	France Paris	5 July 2014
2	William Sharman	England	13.16	Switzerland Zurich	12 August 2014
3	Andrew Riley	Jamaica	13.19	Monaco Monaco	18 July 2014
4	Wayne Davis	Trinidad and Tobago	13.20	United States Fayetteville	31 May 2014
5	Shane Brathwaite	Barbados	13.24	Great Britain London	20 July 2014
6	Greggmar Swift	Barbados	13.35	United States Eugene	14 June 2014
7	Ryan Brathwaite	Barbados	13.37	Barbados Waterford	21 June 2014
8	Lawrence Clarke	England	13.41	Netherlands Hengleo	8 June 2014
9	Mikel Thomas	Trinidad and Tobago	13.42	United States Clermont	26 April 2014
10	Omar McLeod	Jamaica	13.44	United States Fayetteville	31 May 2014

Women
#	Athlete	Country	Performance	Venue	Date
1	Tiffany Porter	England	12.51	Morocco Marrakech	14 September 2014
2	Sally Pearson	Australia	12.59	Australia Perth	22 February 2014
3	Angela Whyte	Canada	12.89	United States Walnut	19 April 2014
4	Monique Morgan	Jamaica	12.94	Jamaica Kingston	29 June 2014
5	Shermaine Williams	Jamaica	12.95	Jamaica Kingston	29 June 2014
6	Indira Spence	Jamaica	12.98	United States Walnut	19 April 2014
7	Kierre Beckles	Barbados	12.98	United States Clermont	31 May 2014
	Danielle Williams	Jamaica	12.99	Jamaica Kingston	29 June 2014
8	Brianne Theisen-Eaton	Canada	13.00	Great Britain London	20 July 2014
	Samantha Scarlett	Jamaica	13.01	United States Jacksonville	31 May 2014
	Samantha Elliott	Jamaica	13.05	United States Allendale	24 May 2014
	Nickiesha Wilson	Jamaica	13.06	United States Baltimore	11 April 2014
	Megan Simmonds	Jamaica	13.08	Jamaica Kingston	29 June 2014
9	Phylicia George	Canada	13.12	United States Clermont	10 May 2014
	Kimberly Laing	Jamaica	13.12	Jamaica Kingston	29 June 2014
10	Shannon McCann	Australia	13.15	Australia Perth	22 February 2014

== 400 metres hurdles ==
Men
#	Athlete	Country	Performance	Venue	Date
1	Cornel Fredericks	South Africa	48.25	Switzerland Zurich	28 August 2014
2	Roxroy Cato	Jamaica	48.48	Jamaica Kingston	27 June 2014
3	Answert Whyte	Jamaica	48.58	Jamaica Kingston	27 June 2014
4	Jehue Gordon	Trinidad and Tobago	48.75	Great Britain Glasgow	31 July 2014
5	Jeffrey Gibson	Bahamas	48.78	Great Britain Glasgow	31 July 2014
6	Niall Flannery	England	48.80	Czech Republic Ostrava	18 June 2014
7	Cristian Morton	Nigeria	48.92	Morocco Marrakech	12 August 2014
8	LJ van Zyl	South Africa	48.96	South Africa Sasolburg	25 March 2014
9	Leford Green	Jamaica	49.00	Jamaica Kingston	27 June 2014
10	Nicholas Bett	Nigeria	49.03	Morocco Marrakech	12 August 2014

Women
#	Athlete	Country	Performance	Venue	Date
1	Kaliese Spencer	Jamaica	53.41	Jamaica Kingston	27 June 2014
2	Eilidh Child	Scotland	54.39	Great Britain Glasgow	11 July 2014
3	Janieve Russell	Jamaica	54.75	Jamaica Kingston	27 June 2014
3	Wenda Theron Nel	South Africa	54.82	Morocco Marrakech	8 June 2014
5	Ristananna Tracey	Jamaica	55.12	Jamaica Kingston	3 May 2014
	Nikita Tracey	Jamaica	55.18	Jamaica Kingston	27 June 2014
	Nickiesha Wilson	Jamaica	55.22	Czech Republic Ostrava	18 June 2014
6	Janeil Bellille	Trinidad and Tobago	55.41	United States Fayetteville	30 May 2014
7	Amaka Ogoegbunam	Nigeria	55.46	Morocco Marrakech	12 August 2014
8	Meghan Beesley	England	55.55	Belgium Namur	28 May 2014
	Shevon Stoddart	Jamaica	55.59	Cayman Islands George Town	7 May 2014
9	Lauren Wells	Australia	55.69	Belgium Oordegem-Lede	5 July 2014
10	Noelle Montcalm	Canada	55.81	Denmark Copenhagen	6 August 2014

== 3000 metres steeplechase ==
Men
#	Athlete	Country	Performance	Venue	Date
1	Jairus Birech	Kenya	7:58.41	Belgium Brussels	5 September 2014
2	Ezekiel Kemboi	Kenya	8:04.12	Qatar Doha	9 May 2014
3	Brimin Kipruto	Kenya	8:04.64	Qatar Doha	9 May 2014
	Paul Koech	Kenya	8:05.47	Qatar Doha	9 May 2014
	Hillary Yego	Kenya	8:09.07	Qatar Doha	9 May 2014
	Conseslus Kipruto	Kenya	8:09.81	Monaco Monaco	18 July 2014
	Gilbert Kirui	Kenya	8:11.86	Qatar Doha	9 May 2014
4	Matthew Hughes	Canada	8:12.81	Monaco Monaco	18 July 2014
	Jonathon Ndiku	Kenya	8:12.95	Switzerland Lausanne	3 July 2014
	Bernard Nganga	Kenya	8:15.01	Monaco Monaco	18 July 2014
	Abel Mutai	Kenya	8:15.83	Italy Rome	5 June 2014
	Clement Kemboi Kimutai	Kenya	8:16.96	Italy Rome	5 June 2014
	Lawrence Kipsang	Kenya	8:19.90	Italy Rome	5 June 2014
	John Kibet Koech	Kenya	8:19.99	Poland Bydgoszcz	11 May 2014
5	Jacob Araptany	Uganda	8:20.84	Japan Tokyo	11 May 2014
6	James Wilkinson	England	8:22.76	Spain Huelva	9 June 2014
7	Benjamin Kiplagat	Uganda	8:26.05	Japan Tokyo	11 May 2014
8	Taylor Milne	Canada	8:27.81	Canada Guelph	31 May 2014
9	Chris Winter	Canada	8:28.17	Switzerland Luzern	15 July 2014
	Nicholas Kiptonui Bett	Kenya	8:28.83	Germany Dessau	11 June 2014
	Anthony Rotich	Kenya	8:30.54	United States Palo Alto	4 May 2014
10	James Nipperess	Australia	8:34.64	Japan Tokyo	11 May 2014

Women
#	Athlete	Country	Performance	Venue	Date
1	Milcah Chemos Cheywa	Kenya	9:21.91	Great Britain Glasgow	12 July 2014
2	Hyvin Kiyeng Jepkemoi	Kenya	9:22.58	Czech Republic Ostrava	18 June 2014
3	Purity Kirui	Kenya	9:23.43	United States New York	13 June 2014
	Lydia Chepkurui	Kenya	9:24.07	France Paris	5 July 2014
	Ruth Chebet	Kenya	9:27.90	Morocco Marrakech	8 June 2014
4	Genevieve Lacaze	Australia	9:33.19	Great Britain Glasgow	12 July 2014
5	Jessica Furlan	Canada	9:33.54	United States Heusden-Zolder	19 July 2014
6	Madeline Heiner	Australia	9:36.31	Great Britain Glasgow	12 July 2014
	Fancy Cherotich	Kenya	9:41.02	United States Eugene	31 May 2014
7	Victoria Mitchell	Australia	9:42.01	Australia Melbourne	5 April 2014
	Gladys Kipkemoi	Kenya	9:42.88	China Beijing	21 May 2014
8	Eilish McColgan	Scotland	9:44.69	Great Britain Glasgow	12 July 2014
9	Chantelle Groenewoud	Canada	9:45.42	United States Heusden-Zolder	19 July 2014
10	Lennie Waite	Scotland	9:48.17	United States Palo Alto	4 April 2014

== Marathon ==
Men
#	Athlete	Country	Performance	Venue	Date
1	Wilson Kipsang Kiprotich	Kenya	2:04:29	Great Britain London	13 April 2014
2	Stanley Kipleting Biwott	Kenya	2:04:55	Great Britain London	13 April 2014
3	Eliud Kipchoge	Kenya	2:05:00	Netherlands Rotterdam	13 April 2014
	Dickson Kiptolo Chumba	Kenya	2:05:42	Japan Tokyo	23 February 2014
	Bernard Koech	Kenya	2:06:08	Netherlands Rotterdam	13 April 2014
	Stephen Chemlany	Kenya	2:06:24	South Korea Seoul	16 March 2014
	Sammy Kitwara	Kenya	2:06:30	Japan Tokyo	23 February 2014
	Gilbert Kirwa	Kenya	2:06:44	South Korea Seoul	16 March 2014
	Michael Kipyego	Kenya	2:06:58	Japan Tokyo	23 February 2014
	Eric Ndiema	Kenya	2:07:01	Germany Hamburg	4 May 2014
	Peter Some	Kenya	2:07:05	Japan Tokyo	23 February 2014
4	Mo Farah	England	2:08:21	Great Britain London	13 April 2014
5	Abraham Kiplimo	Uganda	2:09:23	Japan Oita	2 February 2014
6	Cuthbert Nyasango	Zimbabwe	2:09:52	Hungary Praha	5 May 2014
7	Thabiso Moeng	South Africa	2:10:21	Chinese Taipei Xiamen	2 January 2014
8	Michael Shelley	Australia	2:11:15	Great Britain Glasgow	27 July 2014
9	Chris Thompson	England	2:11:19	Great Britain London	13 April 2014
10	Stephen Kiprotich	Uganda	2:11:37	Great Britain London	13 April 2014

Women
#	Athlete	Country	Performance	Venue	Date
1	Edna Kiplagat	Kenya	2:20:24	Great Britain London	13 April 2014
2	Florence Kiplagat	Kenya	2:20:21	Great Britain London	13 April 2014
3	Flomena Cheyech Daniel	Kenya	2:22:44	France Paris	6 April 2014
	Lucy Wangui	Kenya	2:24:16	Japan Tokyo	23 February 2014
	Caroline Rotich	Kenya	2:24:35	Japan Tokyo	23 February 2014
	Janet Jelagat Rono	Kenya	2:26:03	Japan Tokyo	23 February 2014
	Georgina Rono	Kenya	2:26:48	Germany Hamburg	4 May 2014
	Caroline Kilel	Kenya	2:27:10	Great Britain Glasgow	27 July 2014
	Helah Kiprop	Kenya	2:27:29	South Korea Seoul	16 March 2014
	Agnes Kiprop	Kenya	2:27:51	Japan Nagoya	9 March 2014
	Winnie Jepkorir	Kenya	2:27:57	Germany Hamburg	4 May 2014
4	Helalia Johannes	Namibia	2:28:27	South Korea Seoul	16 March 2014
5	Jessica Trengove	Australia	2:30:12	Great Britain Glasgow	27 July 2014
	Agnes Barosio	Kenya	2:30:37	Japan Nagoya	9 March 2014
6	Beata Naigambo	Namibia	2:31:00	Netherlands Rotterdam	13 April 2014
7	Lanni Marchant	Canada	2:31:14	Great Britain Glasgow	27 July 2014

== 4x100 metres Relay ==
Men
#	Athlete	Country	Performance	Venue	Date
1	Jamaica	Jamaica	37.58	Great Britain Glasgow	2 August 2014
2	England	England	37.93	Bahamas Nassau	25 May 2014
3	Trinidad and Tobago	Trinidad and Tobago	38.04	Bahamas Nassau	25 May 2014
4	South Africa	South Africa	38.35	Great Britain Glasgow	2 August 2014
5	Canada	Canada	38.41	Great Britain Glasgow	1 August 2014
6	Bahamas	Bahamas	38.52	Great Britain Glasgow	1 August 2014
7	Saint Kitts and Nevis	Saint Kitts and Nevis	38.76	Bahamas Nassau	25 May 2014
8	Nigeria	Nigeria	39.11	Great Britain Glasgow	1 August 2014
9	Australia	Australia	39.21	Bahamas Nassau	25 May 2014
10	Barbados	Barbados	39.27	Bahamas Nassau	25 May 2014

Women
#	Athlete	Country	Performance	Venue	Date
1	Jamaica	Jamaica	41.83	Great Britain Glasgow	2 August 2014
2	England	England	42.27	Great Britain Zurich	17 August 2014
3	Trinidad and Tobago	Trinidad and Tobago	42.59	Bahamas Nassau	24 May 2014
4	Nigeria	Nigeria	42.67	Bahamas Nassau	24 May 2014
5	Canada	Canada	43.33	Bahamas Nassau	24 May 2014
6	Bahamas	Bahamas	43.46	Bahamas Nassau	24 May 2014
7	Australia	Australia	44.21	Great Britain Glasgow	2 August 2014
9	Wales	Wales	44.51	Great Britain Glasgow	2 August 2014
8	British Virgin Islands	British Virgin Islands	44.53	Bahamas Nassau	24 May 2014
10	India	India	44.81	Great Britain Glasgow	1 August 2014

== 4x400 metres Relay ==
Men
#	Athlete	Country	Performance	Venue	Date
1	Bahamas	Bahamas	2:57.59	Bahamas Nassau	25 May 2014
2	Trinidad and Tobago	Trinidad and Tobago	2:58.34	Bahamas Nassau	25 May 2014
3	England	England	2:58.79	Switzerland Zurich	17 August 2014
4	Jamaica	Jamaica	3:01.17	Bahamas Nassau	24 May 2014
5	Scotland	Scotland	3:03.94	Great Britain Glasgow	1 August 2014
6	Australia	Australia	3:04.19	Great Britain Glasgow	2 August 2014
7	Nigeria	Nigeria	3:04.48	Bahamas Nassau	24 May 2014
8	Canada	Canada	3:04.67	Bahamas Nassau	25 May 2014
9	Kenya	Kenya	3:04.69	Bahamas Nassau	24 May 2014
10	Zambia	Zambia	3:07.43	Great Britain Glasgow	1 August 2014

Women
#	Athlete	Country	Performance	Venue	Date
1	Jamaica	Jamaica	3:23.26	Bahamas Nassau	25 May 2014
2	Nigeria	Nigeria	3:23.41	Bahamas Nassau	25 May 2014
3	England	England	3:27.24	Great Britain Glasgow	2 August 2014
4	Australia	Australia	3:30.27	Great Britain Glasgow	2 August 2014
5	Trinidad and Tobago	Trinidad and Tobago	3:30.91	Bahamas Nassau	24 May 2014
6	Canada	Canada	3:31.02	Great Britain Glasgow	1 August 2014
7	Bahamas	Bahamas	3:31.91	Great Britain Glasgow	1 August 2014
8	India	India	3:33.67	Great Britain Glasgow	1 August 2014
9	Scotland	Scotland	3:33.91	Great Britain Glasgow	1 August 2014
10	New Zealand	New Zealand	3:34.62	Great Britain Glasgow	1 August 2014

== High jump ==
Men
#	Athlete	Country	Performance	Venue	Date
1	Derek Drouin	Canada	2.40 m	United States Des Moines	25 April 2014
2	Kabelo Kgosiemang	Botswana	2.28 m	South Africa Germiston	15 March 2014
2	Michael Mason	Canada	2.28 m	United States Walnut	19 April 2014
2	Ray Bobrownicki	Scotland	2.28 m	Great Britain Grangemouth	13 July 2014
2	Kyriakos Ioannou	Cyprus	2.28 m	Great Britain Glasgow	30 July 2014
6	Chris Baker	England	2.27 m	Great Britain Loughborough	18 May 2014
7	Ryan Ingraham	Bahamas	2.26 m	United States Athens	13 April 2014
8	Trevor Barry	Bahamas	2.25 m	United States Des Moines	25 April 2014
8	Brandon Starc	Australia	2.25 m	Japan Tokyo	10 May 2014
8	David Smith	Scotland	2.25 m	Great Britain Loughborough	24 May 2014
8	Allan Smith	Scotland	2.25 m	Great Britain Bedford	1 June 2014
8	Tom Parsons	England	2.25 m	Great Britain Bedford	1 June 2014
8	Donald Thomas	Bahamas	2.25 m	Morocco Marrakech	8 June 2014

Women
#	Athlete	Country	Performance	Venue	Date
1	Lavern Spencer	Saint Lucia	1.96 m	United States Athens	12 April 2014
2	Eleanor Patterson	Australia	1.94 m	Australia Gold Coast	13 July 2014
3	Morgan Lake	England	1.93 m	Great Britain Loughborough	18 May 2014
4	Leontina Kallenou	Cyprus	1.92 m	United States Lexington	17 May 2014
4	Isobel Pooley	England	1.92 m	Great Britain Glasgow	1 August 2014
5	Niki Oudenaarden	Canada	1.91 m	United States San Diego	15 March 2014
7	Katarina Johnson-Thompson	England	1.90 m	Austria Gotzis	31 May 2014
8	Sarah Cowley	New Zealand	1.89 m	Australia Melbourne	6 April 2014
8	Hannah Joye	Australia	1.89 m	Australia Southport	28 June 2014
8	Alyxandria Treasure	Canada	1.89 m	Canada Moncton	27 June 2014
8	Jeanelle Scheper	Saint Lucia	1.89 m	United States Glasgow	1 August 2014

== Pole vault ==
Men
#	Athlete	Country	Performance	Venue	Date
1	Steven Lewis	England	5.70 m	United States Des Moines	26 April 2014
2	Max Eaves	England	5.62 m	Great Britain Loughborough	19 July 2014
3	Shawnacy Barber	Canada	5.60 m	United States Walnut	19 April 2014
3	Jax Thoirs	Scotland	5.60 m	United States Seattle	10 May 2014
3	Luke Cutts	England	5.60 m	United Kingdom London	20 July 2014
6	Jason Wurster	Canada	5.55 m	Canada Moncton	27 June 2014
7	Gregor McLean	Scotland	5.45 m	Great Britain Cardiff	10 May 2014
8	Joel Pocklington	Australia	5.41 m	Australia Glendale	18 January 2014
9	Harry Coppell	England	5.40 m	Germany Mannheim	6 July 2014

Women
#	Athlete	Country	Performance	Venue	Date
1	Alana Boyd	Australia	4.65 m	Germany Mannheim	5 July 2014
2	Zoe Brown	Northern Ireland	4.45 m	United States Cardiff	15 July 2014
2	Eliza McCartney	New Zealand	4.45 m	United States Eugene	24 July 2014
4	Alysha Newman	Canada	4.41 m	United States Atlanta	17 May 2014
5	Sally Peake	Wales	4.40 m	Great Britain Glasgow	12 July 2014
5	Nina Kennedy	Australia	4.40 m	United States Eugene	24 July 2014
7	Lucy Bryan	England	4.35 m	Switzerland Geneva	14 June 2014
8	Liz Parnov	Australia	4.30 m	Australia Perth	7 March 2014
8	Vicky Parnov	Australia	4.30 m	Australia Sydney	15 March 2014
8	Henrietta Paxton	Scotland	4.30 m	Great Britain Loughborough	11 June 2014

== Long jump ==
Men
#	Athlete	Country	Performance	Venue	Date
1	Greg Rutherford	England	8.51 m	United States Chula Vista	24 April 2014
2	Zarck Visser	South Africa	8.31 mA	South Africa Pretoria	11 April 2014
3	Chris Tomlinson	England	8.23 m	Germany Bottrop	1 June 2014
4	Rushwal Samaai	South Africa	8.13 mA	South Africa Germiston	15 March 2014
5	Henry Frayne	Australia	8.10 m	Australia Melbourne	22 March 2014
5	Damar Forbes	Jamaica	8.10 m	Jamaica Kingston	28 June 2014
7	Godfrey Mokoena	South Africa	8.09 m	Sweden Stockholm	21 August 2014
8	JJ Jegede	England	8.05 m	France Bai Mahault	10 May 2013
9	Robert Crowther	Australia	8.03 m	Australia Melbourne	6 April 2014
10	Fabrice Lapierre	Australia	8.00 m	Great Britain Glasgow	30 July 2014

Women
#	Athlete	Country	Performance	Venue	Date
1	Katarina Johnson-Thompson	England	6.92 m	Great Britain Glasgow	11 July 2014
2	Blessing Okagbare	Nigeria	6.86 m	China Shanghai	18 May 2014
3	Shara Proctor	England	6.82 m	Great Britain Glasgow	11 July 2014
4	Christabel Nettey	Canada	6.73 m	Great Britain Glasgow	11 July 2014
5	Brooke Stratton	Australia	6.70 m	Australia Perth	6 April 2014
6	Ese Brume	Nigeria	6.68 m	Nigeria Calabar	21 June 2014
7	Bianca Stuart	Bahamas	6.67 m	Great Britain Glasgow	29 May 2014
8	Margaret Gayen	Australia	6.62 m	Australia Adelaide	18 January 2014
9	Brianne Theisen-Eaton	Canada	6.59 m	Austria Gotzis	1 June 2014
9	Akela Jones	Barbados	6.55 m	United States Gulf Shores	22 May 2014
9	Chantel Malone	British Virgin Islands	6.55 m	Australia Glasgow	29 July 2014

== Triple jump ==
Men
#	Athlete	Country	Performance	Venue	Date
1	Godfrey Mokoena	South Africa	17.20 m	Great Britain Glasgow	2 August 2014
1	Yordanis Durañona	Dominica	17.20 mA	Mexico Mexico	16 August 2014
3	Arpinder Singh	India	17.17 m	India Lucknow	8 June 2014
4	Phillips Idowu	England	16.99 m	Australia Nathan	31 May 2014
5	Tosin Oke	Nigeria	16.97 m	Morocco Marrakech	13 August 2014
6	Latario Collie-Minns	Bahamas	16.91 m	United States Lawrence	18 April 2014
7	Julian Reid	England	16.82 m	Great Britain Birmingham	29 June 2014
8	Olu Olamigoke	Nigeria	16.73 m	United States Charlottesville	9 May 2014
9	Nathan Fox	England	16.69 m	Great Britain Bedford	1 June 2014
	Nathan Douglas	England	16.65 m	Great Britain Bedford	1 June 2014
	Kola Adedoyin	England	16.61 m	United States Clermont	26 April 2014
10	Renjith Maheswary	India	16.54 m	India Lucknow	8 June 2014

Women
#	Athlete	Country	Performance	Venue	Date
1	Kimberley Williams	Jamaica	14.59 m	Monaco Monaco	18 July 2014
2	Laura Samuel	England	14.09 m	Great Britain Glasgow	29 July 2014
3	Ayanna Alexander	Trinidad and Tobago	14.01 m	Great Britain Glasgow	29 July 2014
4	Shanieka Thomas	Jamaica	14.00 m	United States Eugene	13 June 2014
5	Linda Leverton	Australia	13.93 m	Australia Melbourne	5 April 2014
6	Yamilé Aldama	England	13.85 m	Netherlands Hengelo	8 June 2014
7	Mayookha Johny	India	13.71 m	India Lucknow	7 June 2014
8	Nneka Okpala	New Zealand	13.55 m	Australia Melbourne	5 April 2014
9	Ellen Pettit	Australia	13.54 m	Great Britain Glasgow	29 July 2014
10	Tamara Moncreiffe	Jamaica	13.51 m	Jamaica Kingston	28 March 2014

== Shot put ==
Men
#	Athlete	Country	Performance	Venue	Date
1	O'Dayne Richards	Jamaica	21.61 m	Great Britain Glasgow	28 July 2014
2	Tomas Walsh	New Zealand	21.24 m	Great Britain Glasgow	27 July 2014
3	Tim Nedow	Canada	20.98 m	United States La Jolla	26 April 2014
4	Jacko Gill	New Zealand	20.70 m	Cook Islands Rarotonga	25 June 2014
5	Stephen Mozia	Nigeria	20.38 m	United States Jacksonville	29 May 2014
6	Raymond Brown	Jamaica	20.35 m	Jamaica Kingston	5 April 2014
7	Orazio Cremona	South Africa	20.29 mA	South Africa Pretoria	11 April 2014
8	Justin Rodhe	Canada	20.19 m	United States Lawrence	18 April 2014
9	Ramone Baker	Jamaica	19.82 m	Jamaica Kingston	11 January 2014
10	Damien Birkenhead	Australia	19.69 m	Australia Melbourne	1 June 2014

Women
#	Athlete	Country	Performance	Venue	Date
1	Valerie Adams	New Zealand	20.59 m	Belgium Brussels	5 September 2014
2	Cleopatra Borel-Brown	Trinidad and Tobago	19.10 m	Cuba Havana	19 March 2014
3	Julie Labonté	Canada	17.58 m	Great Britain Glasgow	30 July 2014
4	Eden Francis	England	17.07 m	Great Britain Nuneaton	17 May 2014
5	Dani Samuels	Australia	17.05 m	Australia Sydney	2 March 2014
6	Ayanna Alexander	Trinidad and Tobago	16.89 m	United States New Haven	19 April 2014
7	Auriol Dongmo Mekemnang	Cameroon	16.84 m	Morocco Marrakech	14 August 2014
8	Rachel Wallader	England	16.83 m	Great Britain Glasgow	30 July 2014
9	Danniel Thomas	Jamaica	16.82 m	United States Athens	16 May 2014
10	Sophie McKinna	England	16.59 m	Great Britain Glasgow	30 July 2014

== Discus throw ==
Men
#	Athlete	Country	Performance	Venue	Date
1	Fedrick Dacres	Jamaica	66.75 m	United States Austin	29 March 2014
2	Benn Harradine	Australia	65.94 m	Australia Brisbane	29 March 2014
3	Vikas Gowda	India	65.62 m	United States Tucson	24 May 2014
4	Julian Wruck	Australia	65.01 m	United States Austin	29 March 2014
5	Jason Morgan	Jamaica	64.72 m	United States Hattiesburg	3 May 2014
6	Chad Wright	Jamaica	63.96 m	United States West Lafayette	17 May 2014
7	Victor Hogan	South Africa	63.47 m	United States New York	14 June 2014
8	Brett Morse	Wales	63.34 m	Great Britain Cardiff	12 July 2014
9	Stephen Mozia	Nigeria	62.80 m	United States Jacksonville	31 May 2014
10	Carl Myerscough	England	62.57 m	United States Claremont	28 June 2014

Women
#	Athlete	Country	Performance	Venue	Date
1	Dani Samuels	Australia	67.99 m	Germany Wiesbaden	11 May 2014
2	Seema Antil	India	61.61 m	Great Britain Glasgow	1 August 2014
3	Kellion Knibb	Jamaica	61.34 m	United States Jacksonville	30 May 2014
4	Jade Lally	England	60.48 m	Great Britain Glasgow	1 August 2014
5	Chinwe Okoro	Nigeria	59.79 m	Morocco Marrakech	12 August 2014
6	Siositina Hakeai	New Zealand	59.65 m	New Zealand Hamilton	8 February 2014
7	Danniel Thomas	Jamaica	59.38 m	United States Akron	10 May 2014
8	Krishna Poonia	India	59.17 m	United States Lisle	12 July 2014
9	Taryn Gollshewsky	Australia	58.24 m	Great Britain Glasgow	31 July 2014
10	Kirsty Law	Scotland	57.15 m	Great Britain Loughborough	12 April 2014

== Hammer throw ==
Men
#	Athlete	Country	Performance	Venue	Date
1	James Steacy	Canada	75.27 m	Canada Lethbridge	16 May 2014
2	Nick Miller	England	74.38 m	United States Lubbock	16 May 2014
3	Chris Harmse	South Africa	73.90	Morocco Marrakech	13 August 2014
4	Alex Smith	England	73.52 m	Great Britain Birmingham	28 June 2014
5	Mark Dry	Scotland	73.27 m	Great Britain Birmingham	28 June 2014
6	Chris Bennett	Scotland	72.58 m	Great Britain Birmingham	28 June 2014
7	Andrew Frost	Scotland	71.19 m	Great Britain Loughborough	1 March 2014
8	Amir Williamson	England	70.07 m	Great Britain Bedford	24 May 2014
9	Timothy Driesen	Australia	69.94 m	Great Britain Glasgow	29 July 2014
	James Bedford	England	69.72 m	Great Britain Hull	24 May 2014

Women
#	Athlete	Country	Performance	Venue	Date
1	Sultana Frizell	Canada	75.73 m	United States Tucson	22 May 2014
2	Sophie Hitchon	England	71.53 m	Germany Halle	17 May 2014
3	Julia Ratcliffe	New Zealand	70.28 m	United States Princeton	19 April 2014
4	Jillian Weir	Canada	67.43 m	United States Pullman	18 May 2014
5	Shaunagh Brown	England	66.85 m	Sweden Gothenburg	14 June 2014
6	Carys Parry	Wales	66.80 m	Great Britain Cardiff	15 July 2014
7	Heather Steacy	Canada	66.73 m	Canada Calgary	31 May 2014
8	Rachel Hunter	Scotland	66.30 m	Great Britain Loughborough	18 May 2014
9	Sarah Holt	England	65.67 m	Great Britain Glasgow	28 July 2014
	Lauren Stuart	Canada	65.05 m	Canada Moncton	27 June 2014
10	Susan McKelvie	Scotland	64.21 m	Great Britain Kilmarnock	16 August 2014

== Javelin throw ==
Men
#	Athlete	Country	Performance	Venue	Date
1	Keshorn Walcott	Trinidad and Tobago	85.28 m	Australia Glasgow	1 August 2014
2	Julius Yego	Kenya	84.67 m	Sweden Stockholm	21 August 2014
3	Joshua Robinson	Australia	82.48 m	Australia Melbourne	6 April 2014
4	Hamish Peacock	Australia	82.24 m	Sweden Solentunna	26 June 2014
5	Stuart Farquhar	New Zealand	79.69 m	Finland Lahti	15 June 2014
6	Luke Cann	Australia	79.36 m	Australia Glasgow	1 August 2014
7	John Robert Oosthuizen	South Africa	78.80 mA	South Africa Pretoria	11 April 2014
	Matthew Outzen	Australia	78.05 m	Australia Glendale	18 January 2014
8	Rocco van Rooyen	South Africa	77.59 mA	South Africa Pretoria	11 April 2014
9	Raymond Dykstra	Canada	76.72 m	United States Eugene	14 June 2014
10	Lee Doran	Wales	76.61 m	Great Britain Cardiff	1 June 2014

Women
#	Athlete	Country	Performance	Venue	Date
1	Kimberley Mickle	Australia	66.83 m	Australia Melbourne	22 March 2014
2	Kathryn Mitchell	Australia	66.10 m	Australia Adelaide	15 February 2014
3	Sunette Viljoen	South Africa	64.77 mA	Russia Pretoria	12 April 2014
4	Elizabeth Gleadle	Canada	64.50 m	Canada Lethbridge	16 May 2014
5	Kelsey-Lee Roberts	Australia	63.92 m	Australia Canberra	8 February 2014
6	Goldie Sayers	England	62.75 m	Great Britain Birmingham	29 June 2014
7	Babaranda Liyangae	Sri Lanka	59.04 m	Great Britain Glasgow	30 July 2014
8	Izzy Jeffs	England	58.63 m	Great Britain Loughborough	26 April 2014
	Mackenzie Little	Australia	57.60m	Australia Melbourne	4 April 2014
9	Annu Rani	India	56.37 m	Great Britain Glasgow	30 July 2014
10	Freya Jones	England	55.36 m	United States Athens	12 April 2014

== Decathlon/Heptathlon ==
Men
#	Athlete	Country	Performance	Venue	Date
1	Damian Warner	Canada	8282	Great Britain Glasgow	29 July 2014
2	Willem Coertzen	South Africa	8199 A	South Africa Pretoria	11 April 2014
3	Ashley Bryant	England	8141	Austria Gotzis	1 June 2014
4	Kurt Felix	Grenada	8070	Great Britain Glasgow	29 July 2014
5	John Lane	England	7846	Austria Gotzis	1 June 2014
6	Stephen Cain	Australia	7787	Great Britain Glasgow	29 July 2014
7	Benjamin Gregory	Wales	7725	Great Britain Glasgow	29 July 2014
8	Fredriech Pretorius	South Africa	7639	Great Britain Glasgow	29 July 2014
9	Jake Stein	Australia	7601	Australia Canberra	2 February 2014
10	Osman Muskwe	England	7565	Poland Torun	6 July 2014

Women
#	Athlete	Country	Performance	Venue	Date
1	Katarina Johnson-Thompson	England	6682	Austria Gotzis	1 June 2014
2	Brianne Theisen-Eaton	Canada	6641	Austria Gotzis	1 June 2014
3	Jessica Zelinka	Canada	6270	Great Britain Glasgow	30 July 2014
4	Morgan Lake	England	6081	Austria Gotzis	1 June 2014
5	Angela Whyte	Canada	6018	United States Azusa	17 April 2014
6	Salcia Slack	Jamaica	5833A	United States Alamosa	3 May 2014
7	Jessica Taylor	England	5826	Great Britain Glasgow	30 July 2014
	Rachael McIntosh	Canada	5789	United States Azusa	17 April 2014
	Jessica Tappin	England	5770	Spain Malaga	1 June 2014
8	Sophie Stanwell	Australia	5754	Great Britain Glasgow	30 July 2014
	Natahsa Jackson	Canada	5732	United States Azusa	17 April 2014
	Niki Oudenaarden	Canada	5721	United States Azusa	17 April 2014
	Grace Clements	England	5710	Spain Arona	25 May 2014
	Natasha Jackson	Canada	5700	Canada Calgary	11 May 2014
9	Portia Bing	New Zealand	5695	New Zealand Auckland	16 February 2014

== See also ==
- List of Commonwealth records in athletics
- List of Commonwealth Games records in athletics
- Athletics at the 2014 Commonwealth Games
