= 2008 African Championships in Athletics – Men's high jump =

The men's high jump event at the 2008 African Championships in Athletics was held at the Addis Ababa Stadium on May 4.

== Results ==
Rank	Athlete	Nationality	1.85	1.95	2.00	2.05	2.10	2.15	2.18	2.21	2.24	2.30	2.32	2.34	2.36	Result	Notes
1st place, gold medalist(s)	Kabelo Kgosiemang	Botswana	–	–	–	–	o	–	o	–	xo	xo	o	xxo	xx–	2.34	NR
2nd place, silver medalist(s)	Mohamed Benhadia	Algeria	–	–	–	o	o	o	o	xxx						2.18	
3rd place, bronze medalist(s)	Boubacar Séré	Burkina Faso	–	–	–	o	xo	o	xo	xxx						2.18	
4	Karim Samir Lotfy	Egypt	–	–	–	–	o	xo	–	xxx						2.15	
5	William Woodcock	Seychelles	–	–	o	o	xo	xxx								2.10	
6	Hannes von Lieres	Namibia	–	o	xo	o	xxx									2.05	
6	Arinze Obiora	Nigeria	–	–	xo	o	xxx									2.05	
8	Salomon Tuaire	Namibia	–	–	o	xo	xxx									2.05	
9	Hubert de Beer	South Africa	–	–	xxo	xo	xxx									2.05	
10	Mekombo Masanga	Democratic Republic of the Congo	–	o	o	xxx										2.00	
11	Ogula Obange	Ethiopia	o	xxx												1.85	
	Ramsay Carelse	South Africa														DNS	
