= Botswana at the 2007 All-Africa Games =

- IOC code: BOT
- NOC: Botswana National Olympic Committee

in Algiers 11 July 2007 – 23 July 2007
- Medals Ranked 9th: Gold 6 Silver 2 Bronze 5 Total 13

All-Africa Games appearances
- 1991; 1995; 1999; 2003; 2007; 2011; 2015; 2019; 2023

Botswana competed in the 2007 All-Africa Games held at the Stade du 5 Juillet in the city of Algiers, Algeria. The country came ninth with a total of thirteen medals. The team was particularly successful in athletics, winning five gold medals in track and field events as well as beating the continental record in the T46 200 metres sprint.

== Background ==
Botswana first competed the All Africa Games in 1991 and increasingly saw the event as an opportunity to demonstrate its prowess in sport. Its investment paid off and the team returned from each successive event with medals. In 2000, Botswana put a bid in to host the 2007 Games but was unsuccessful, being beaten by Algeria. Nonetheless, the country sent a strong team of competitors to the Games, with support from the new Ministry of Youth, Sports and Culture recently formed in 2007.

== Competitors ==
Botswanan athletes competed in a wide range of events, including chess, track and field, swimming and volleyball. The country came fourth in women's chess, gaining a total of 18 points. The men's volleyball team qualified but won no medals. In contrast, the team secured five gold medals in athletics. Notable competitors included Kabelo Kgosiemang, who secured a gold medal with a high jump of 2.27 metres (7 ft 5 in), and Gable Garenamotse, who won the long jump with a distance of 8.08 metres (26 ft 6 in). As well as winning Gold, Tshotlego Morama set a new African record at 200 metres.

== Medal summary ==
Botswana achieved a total of thirteen medals, six gold, two silver and five bronze, ranking ninth overall.

== List of Medalists ==
=== Medal table ===
Sport	Gold	Silver	Bronze	Total
Athletics	5	0	0	5
Boxing	0	1	1	2
Para-athletics	1	0	0	1
Total	6	2	5	13

=== Gold Medal ===
Medal	Name	Sport	Event	Date	Ref
Gold	Amantle Montsho	Athletics	Women’s 400 metres	20 July 2007	
Gold	California Molefe	Athletics	Men’s 400 metres	20 July 2007	
Gold	Kabelo Kgosiemang	Athletics	High jump	22 July 2007	
Gold	Gable Garenamotse	Athletics	Long jump	22 July 2007	
Gold	Zacharia Kamberuka; Isaac Makwala; Obakeng Ngwigwa; Tshepo Kelaotse	Athletics	4 x 400 m relay	22 July 2007	
Gold	Tshotlego Morama	Para-athletics	Women's 200 metres T46	15 July 2007	

=== Silver Medal ===
Medal	Name	Sport	Event	Date	Ref
Silver	Herbert Nkabiti	Boxing	Light Welterweight (– 64 kilograms)	18 July 2007	

=== Bronze Medal ===
Medal	Name	Sport	Event	Date	Ref
Bronze	Khumiso Ikgopoleng	Boxing	Bantamweight (– 54 kilograms)	18 July 2007	

== See also ==
- Botswana at the African Games
