= Djoumessi =

Djoumessi is a surname. Notable people with the surname include:

- Emmanuel Nganou Djoumessi (born 1957), Cameroonian politician and minister
- Fernand Djoumessi (born 1989), Cameroonian high jumper
