= 2018 African Championships in Athletics – Men's high jump =

The men's high jump event at the 2018 African Championships in Athletics was held on 3 August in Asaba, Nigeria.

== Results ==
Rank	Athlete	Nationality	1.85	1.95	2.00	2.05	2.10	2.15	2.18	2.21	2.24	2.26	2.28	2.30	2.32	Result	Notes
1st place, gold medalist(s)	Mathew Sawe	Kenya	–	o	–	–	o	o	o	o	–	xo	xxo	xo	xx	2.30	=NR
2nd place, silver medalist(s)	Chris Moleya	South Africa	–	–	–	x–	x–	o	xo	o	–	o	–	xxx		2.26	
3rd place, bronze medalist(s)	Mpho Links	South Africa	–	–	–	xxo	o	xo	xx–	x						2.15	
4	Mike Edwards	Nigeria	–	–	–	o	o	xxo	–	xxx						2.15	
5	Marouane Kacimi	Morocco	–	–	o	–	xxo	xxx								2.10	
6	Mohamed Aboutaleb	Egypt	–	o	o	xo	xxx									2.05	
6	Daniel Ngembou	Congo	–	–	o	xo	xxx									2.05	
8	Noe Ondja	Burkina Faso	–	o	xxo	xxo	xxx									2.05	
9	Ali Mohd Younes Idriss	Sudan	–	o	o	xxx										2.00	
10	Norris Brioche	Seychelles	–	o	xx											1.95	
11	Kadmiel Enders	Liberia	o	xxx												1.85	
11	Nuop Lim	Ethiopia	o	xxx												1.85	
	Ramiz Ouedraogo	Burkina Faso														DNS	
