= 2006 African Championships in Athletics – Men's high jump =

The men's high jump event at the 2006 African Championships in Athletics was held at the Stade Germain Comarmond on August 13.

== Results ==
Rank	Name	Nationality	Result	Notes
1st place, gold medalist(s)	Kabelo Kgosiemang	Botswana	2.30	PB
2nd place, silver medalist(s)	Boubacar Séré	Burkina Faso	2.22	
3rd place, bronze medalist(s)	Ramsay Carelse	South Africa	2.22	
4	Mohamed Benhadia	Algeria	2.19	
5	Samson Idiata	Nigeria	2.15	
6	Arinze Obiora	Nigeria	2.15	
7	Serge Foungtcho	Cameroon	2.10	
8	Jude Sidonie	Seychelles	2.05	
8	Onnanye Ramohube	Botswana	2.05	
10	William Woodcock	Seychelles	2.05	
11	Mathieu Gomis	Senegal	2.05	
12	Eugene Ernesta	Seychelles	2.00	
12	Salomon Taure	Namibia	2.00	
	Christopher Amankra	Ghana	DNS	
	Ahmed Farouk El-Zaher	Egypt	DNS	
	Mekombo Massanga	Democratic Republic of the Congo	DNS	
