= 2014 African Championships in Athletics – Men's high jump =

Prominent continental sporting event

The men's high jump event at the 2014 African Championships in Athletics was held on August 14 on Stade de Marrakech.

== Results ==
| Rank | Athlete | Nationality | 1.90 | 1.95 | 2.00 | 2.05 | 2.10 | 2.15 | 2.19 | 2.22 | 2.25 | 2.28 | 2.30 | Result | Notes |
|---|---|---|---|---|---|---|---|---|---|---|---|---|---|---|---|
| 1st place, gold medalist(s) | Kabelo Kgosiemang | Botswana | – | – | – | – | o | o | o | o | o | o | xxx | 2.28 | |
| 2nd place, silver medalist(s) | Fernand Djouméssi | Cameroon | – | – | – | – | o | o | o | o | o | x– | xx | 2.25 | |
| 3rd place, bronze medalist(s) | Younes Idriss | Sudan | – | – | – | – | o | o | o | xo | x– | xx | | 2.22 | |
| 4 | Abdoulaye Diarra | Mali | – | – | – | – | o | o | xxo | xxx | | | | 2.19 | |
| 5 | Gobe Takobona | Botswana | – | – | o | – | xo | o | xxx | | | | | 2.15 | |
| 6 | Mathieu Kiplagat Sawe | Kenya | – | – | – | xo | xo | o | xxx | | | | | 2.15 | |
| 7 | Omar Samir Kaseb | Egypt | – | – | o | xo | o | xxx | | | | | | 2.10 | |
| 7 | Saad Hammouda | Morocco | – | o | xo | o | o | xxx | | | | | | 2.10 | |
| 9 | Hichem Krim | Algeria | – | – | o | o | xxo | xxx | | | | | | 2.10 | |
| 10 | Gemechu Temiru | Ethiopia | o | o | o | xxx | | | | | | | | 2.00 | |
| 10 | Manirou Dembele | Senegal | o | o | o | xxx | | | | | | | | 2.00 | |
| 12 | Yatna Lamita | Ethiopia | xo | xxx | | | | | | | | | | 1.90 | |
| 13 | Stephane Varela | Cape Verde | xxo | xxx | | | | | | | | | | 1.90 | |
| | Zakaria Majhour | Morocco | | | | | | | | | | | | DNS | |
