= Athletics at the 2007 All-Africa Games – Men's high jump =

The men's high jump at the 2007 All-Africa Games was held on July 22.

== Results ==
Rank	Athlete	Nationality	Result	Notes
1st place, gold medalist(s)	Kabelo Kgosiemang	Botswana	2.27	=GR
2nd place, silver medalist(s)	Abderrahmane Hammad	Algeria	2.24	
3rd place, bronze medalist(s)	Mohamed Benhadia	Algeria	2.20	
3rd place, bronze medalist(s)	Obiora Arinze	Nigeria	2.20	
5	Adio Bayo	Nigeria	2.20	
6	Boubacar Séré	Burkina Faso	2.20	
7	Ramsey Carelse	South Africa	2.15	
7	Karim Samir Lotfi	Egypt	2.15	
9	Salomon Tuaire	Namibia	2.15	
10	Samson Idiata	Nigeria	2.10	
11	Onanye Ramohube	Botswana	2.10	
12	Serge Foungtcho	Cameroon	2.05	
13	Hamza Labadi	Algeria	2.05	
13	Mekombo Masanga	Democratic Republic of the Congo	2.05	
