= Mohamed Benhadia =

Algerian high jumper

Mohamed Benhadia (born 24 November 1981) is a retired Algerian athlete who specialized in the high jump. Earlier in his career he competed in the pole vault and the decathlon.

His personal best in the event is 2.22 metres from 2007.

== Competition record ==
Year	Competition	Venue	Position	Notes
Representing Algeria
2003	All-Africa Games	Abuja, Nigeria	8th	2.05 m
2004	African Championships	Brazzaville, Republic of the Congo	4th	2.07 m
2006	African Championships	Bambous, Mauritius	4th	2.19 m
2007	All-Africa Games	Algiers, Algeria	3rd	2.20 m
2007	Pan Arab Games	Cairo, Egypt	5th	2.11 m
2008	African Championships	Addis Ababa, Ethiopia	2nd	2.18 m
