= Cadman Evans Yamoah =

Ghanaian high jumper

Cadman Evans Yeboah
Personal information
- Born: Accra, Ghana
- Education: University of Ghana

Sport
- Sport: Athletics
- Event: High jump
Medal record
Men's athletics
Representing Ghana
African Games
Gold medal – first place	2023 Accra	High jump

Cadman Evans Dufu Yamoah is a Ghanaian athlete who specialises in the high jump. He attended tertiary education and competed in athletics at the University of Ghana, where he rose to prominence and was amongst the top high jumpers in the university athlete community. Currently he attends the University of Central Missouri and competes on the Mules track and field team.

He currently holds the Ghanaian high jump record with a jump of 2.20 m which he set in February 2023 at Gorilla Classic, Pittsburg, United States.

In March 2023, he also represented Ghana in the high jump at the 2023 African Games. He won gold in the high jump with a jump of 2.23m, setting a new Ghanaian high jump record.
