= Athletics at the 2014 Commonwealth Games – Men's high jump =

Men's high jump at the Commonwealth Games

The Men's high jump at the 2014 Commonwealth Games, as part of the athletics programme, was a two-day event held at Hampden Park on 28 and 30 July 2014.

== Records ==
| World Record | 2.45 | Javier Sotomayor | CUB | Salamanca, Spain | 27 July 1993 |
| Games Record | 2.36 | Clarence Saunders | BER | Auckland, New Zealand | 1990 |

== Results ==
=== Qualifying round ===
Qualification: 2.20 (Q) or 12 best performers (q) advance to the Final.

| Rank | Group | Athlete | 2.06 | 2.11 | 2.16 | 2.20 | Result | Notes |
|---|---|---|---|---|---|---|---|---|
| =1 | A | Chris Baker (ENG) | - | o | o | o | 2.20 | Q |
| =1 | B | Nik Bojic (AUS) | o | o | o | o | 2.20 | Q |
| =1 | A | Derek Drouin (CAN) | - | o | o | o | 2.20 | Q |
| =1 | B | Ryan Ingraham (BAH) | - | - | o | o | 2.20 | Q |
| =1 | A | Kabelo Kgosiemang (BOT) | - | o | o | o | 2.20 | Q |
| =1 | B | Michael Mason (CAN) | - | o | o | o | 2.20 | Q |
| =7 | A | Fernand Djoumessi Temfack (CMR) | - | o | xo | o | 2.20 | Q |
| =7 | B | Kyriakos Ioannou (CYP) | - | xo | o | o | 2.20 | Q =SB |
| =9 | B | Martyn Bernard (ENG) | o | o | o | xo | 2.20 | Q |
| =9 | B | Tom Parsons (ENG) | - | o | o | xo | 2.20 | Q |
| =9 | B | Donald Thomas (BAH) | - | o | o | xo | 2.20 | Q |
| 12 | B | Raymond Bobrownicki (SCO) | - | xxo | o | xo | 2.20 | Q |
| 13 | A | Brandon Starc (AUS) | o | o | xxo | xxo | 2.20 | Q |
| =14 | A | Domanique Missick (TCI) | o | o | xx– | x | 2.11 | |
| =14 | A | David Smith (SCO) | – | o | xxx | | 2.11 | |
| =14 | A | Jamaal Wilson (BAH) | – | o | – | xxx | 2.11 | |
| 17 | A | Vasilios Konstantinou (CYP) | – | xo | xxx | | 2.11 | |
| 18 | A | Mathieu Kiplagat Sawe (KEN) | xo | xxo | xxx | | 2.11 | |
| =19 | B | Darrell Garwood (JAM) | o | xxx | | | 2.06 | |
| =19 | A | Nauraj Singh Randhawa (MAS) | o | xxx | | | 2.06 | |
| 21 | A | Brendan Williams (DMA) | xo | xxx | | | 2.06 | |
| 22 | B | Simon Phelan (JER) | xxo | xxx | | | 2.06 | |
| | B | Kivarno Handfield (TCI) | xxx | | | | NM | |
| | B | Allan Smith (SCO) | | | | | DNS | |

=== Final ===
| Rank | Athlete | 2.16 | 2.21 | 2.25 | 2.28 | 2.31 | 2.33 | 2.37 | Result | Notes |
|---|---|---|---|---|---|---|---|---|---|---|
| 1st place, gold medalist(s) | Derek Drouin (CAN) | o | o | o | o | xo | – | xxx | 2.31 | |
| 2nd place, silver medalist(s) | Kyriakos Ioannou (CYP) | o | xo | o | o | xx– | x | | 2.28 | SB |
| 3rd place, bronze medalist(s) | Michael Mason (CAN) | xo | o | o | xxx | | | | 2.25 | |
| 4 | Chris Baker (ENG) | o | o | xo | xxx | | | | 2.25 | |
| 5 | Martyn Bernard (ENG) | o | o | xxx | | | | | 2.21 | |
| 5 | Kabelo Kgosiemang (BOT) | o | o | xxx | | | | | 2.21 | |
| 7 | Fernand Djoumessi Temfack (CMR) | xo | o | xxx | | | | | 2.21 | |
| 8 | Brandon Starc (AUS) | xxo | o | xxx | | | | | 2.21 | |
| 9 | Raymond Bobrownicki (SCO) | o | xo | xxx | | | | | 2.21 | |
| 9 | Ryan Ingraham (BAH) | o | xo | xxx | | | | | 2.21 | |
| 9 | Donald Thomas (BAH) | o | xo | xxx | | | | | 2.21 | |
| 12 | Nik Bojic (AUS) | o | xxo | xxx | | | | | 2.21 | |
| 13 | Tom Parsons (ENG) | xxo | xxx | | | | | | 2.16 | |
