= Sudan at the 2003 All-Africa Games =

- IOC code: SUD
- NOC: Sudan Olympic Committee

in Abuja 5 October 2003 – 17 October 2003
- Medals: Gold 0 Silver 0 Bronze 2 Total 2

All-Africa Games appearances (overview)
- 1965; 1973; 1978; 1987–1999; 2003; 2007; 2011; 2015; 2019; 2023

Sudan competed in the 2003 All-Africa Games held at the National Stadium in the city of Abuja, Nigeria. The team entered thirteen events and won two bronze medals, both in athletics.

== Competition ==
The 2003 All-Africa Games were held in Nigeria. Events took place at the National Stadium constructed in the city of Abuja for the event. Sudan competed in thirteen events, twelve for men and one for women. It was one of fifteen countries that took part with more than 80 percent of their team being male. The female entrant, Samia Mohamed, beat Ethiopia's Neguisse Samerwit in the second round of the tennis tournament.

== Medal summary ==
The team won two bronze medals and was ranked joint thirty-eighth in the medal table.

=== Medal table ===
Sport	Gold	Silver	Bronze	Total
Athletics	0	0	2	2
Total	0	0	2	2

== List of Medalists ==
=== Bronze Medal ===
Medal	Name	Sport	Event	Date	Ref
Bronze	Todd Matthews Jouda	Athletics	Men's 110 metres hurdles	12 October	
Bronze	Nagmeldin Ali Abubakr	Athletics	Men's 400 metres	13 October	
