= Mathew Sawe =

Kenyan high jumper

Medal record

Men's athletics

Representing Kenya

African Championships
Gold medal – first place	2016 Durban	High jump
Gold medal – first place	2018 Asaba	High jump
Bronze medal – third place	2012 Porto-Novo	High jump

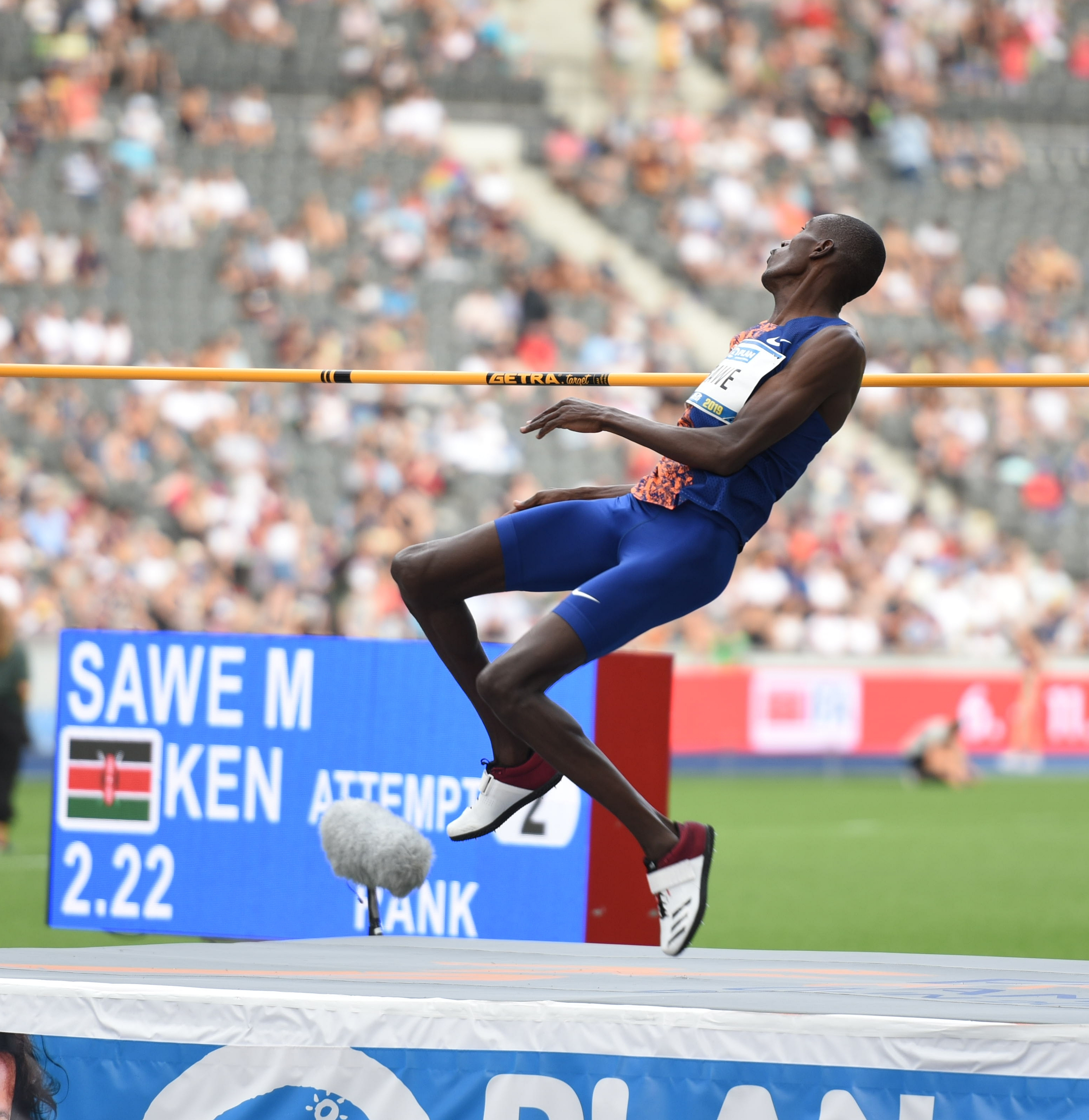
Mathew Sawe, 2019

Mathew Sawe (born 2 July 1988) is a Kenyan track and field athlete who competes in the high jump. He holds a personal best of 2.30 m (7 ft 6 1/2 in), which is the Kenyan record for the event.

He reached international level in 2012 and competed in two events at the African Championship where he reached the high jump podium with a jump of 2.15 m (7 ft 1/2 in), taking the bronze medal. In 2014 he competed at the 2014 African Championships in Athletics and 2014 Commonwealth Games without reaching the podium.

His breakthrough came in 2015, when he won the 2015 national trials with a national record height. A jump of 2.21 m (7 ft 3 in) brought him the gold at the 2016 African Championships in Athletics. This made him the first Kenyan to win that title.

== International competitions ==
Year	Competition	Venue	Position	Event	Notes
2010	African Championships	Nairobi, Kenya	10th	High jump	2.05 m
2012	African Championships	Porto-Novo, Benin	23rd (heats)	800 m	1:56.29
2012	African Championships	Porto-Novo, Benin	3rd	High jump	2.15 m
2014	African Championships	Marrakesh, Morocco	6th	High jump	2.15 m
2014	Commonwealth Games	Glasgow, United Kingdom	18th (q)	High jump	2.11 m
2015	African Games	Brazzaville, Republic of the Congo	4th	High jump	2.19 m
2015	Military World Games	Mungyeong, South Korea	6th	High jump	2.20 m
2016	African Championships	Durban, South Africa	1st	High jump	2.21 m
2018	Commonwealth Games	Gold Coast, Australia	16th (q)	High jump	2.15 m
2018	African Championships	Asaba, Nigeria	1st	High jump	2.30 m
2019	African Games	Rabat, Morocco	2nd	High jump	2.15 m
2019	World Championships	Doha, Qatar	29th (q)	High jump	2.17 m
2021	Olympic Games	Tokyo, Japan	17th (q)	High jump	2.17 m
2022	African Championships	Port Louis, Mauritius	6th	High jump	2.05 m

== National titles ==
- Kenyan Athletics Championships
  - High jump: 2015
