= Mpho Links =

South African high jumper (born 1996)

Personal information
- Full name: Mpho Benjamin Links
- Born: 20 June 1996 (age 30)
- Education: North-West University

Sport
- Sport: Athletics
- Event: High jump
Medal record
Men's athletics
Representing South Africa
African Games
Gold medal – first place	2019 Rabat	High jump
Bronze medal – third place	2023 Accra	High jump
African Championships
Bronze medal – third place	2018 Asaba	High jump
Bronze medal – third place	2022 Saint Pierre	High jump

Mpho Benjamin Links (born 20 June 1996) is a South African athlete specialising in the high jump. He won a gold medal at the 2019 All African Championships, a bronze medal at the 2022 African Championships, a bronze at the 2023 All African Games and a bronze at the 2024 African games.

His personal best in the event was 2.25 metres set in Germiston in 2019, mark he improved with 2.27 m in Potchefstroom (RSA) on 29 April 2021.

== Personal life ==
He is currently married to Sue-Zane Links.

== Competition record ==
Year	Competition	Venue	Position	Notes
Representing South Africa
2015	African Junior Championships	Addis Ababa, Ethiopia	2nd	2.10 m
2015	Universiade	Gwangju, South Korea	12th	2.10 m
2015	African Games	Brazzaville, Republic of the Congo	6th	2.13 m
2017	Universiade	Taipei, Taiwan	7th	2.23 m
2018	African Championships	Asaba, Nigeria	3rd	2.15 m
2019	Universiade	Naples, Italy	5th	2.21 m
2019	African Games	Rabat, Morocco	1st	2.20 m
2022	African Championships	Port Louis, Mauritius	3rd	2.15 m
2024	African Games	Accra, Ghana	3rd	2.21 m
