= Arinze Obiora =

Nigerian high jumper

Arinze Obiora (born 5 December 1985) is a retired Nigerian high jumper.

He finished fourth at the 2003 All-Africa Games, sixth at the 2006 African Championships, won the bronze medal at the 2007 All-Africa Games and finished sixth at the 2008 African Championships.

His personal best was 2.20 metres, achieved in July 2007 in Algiers.
