= William Woodcock =

Seychellois high jumper

Personal information
- Full name: Vincent William Woodcock
- Born: 11 September 1987 (age 38)

Sport
- Sport: Athletics
- Event: High jump

Vincent William Woodcock (born 11 September 1987) is a Seychellois retired athlete who specialised in the high jump. He represented his country at the 2007 World Championships without clearing his opening height in the qualification round.

His personal bests in the event are 2.20 metres outdoors (New Delhi 2010) and 2.18 metres indoors (Karlsruhe 2007). Both are current national records.

== International competitions ==
Year	Competition	Venue	Position	Notes
Representing the Seychelles
2006	African Championships	Bambous, Mauritius	10th	2.05 m
2007	World Championships	Osaka, Japan	–	NM
2008	African Championships	Addis Ababa, Ethiopia	5th	2.10 m
2009	Jeux de la Francophonie	Beirut, Lebanon	8th	2.15 m
2010	African Championships	Nairobi, Kenya	5th	2.15 m
2010	Commonwealth Games	Delhi, India	8th	2.20 m
2011	All-Africa Games	Maputo, Mozambique	3rd	2.15 m
2012	African Championships	Porto-Novo, Benin	4th	2.10 m
