= Sudan at the 2007 All-Africa Games =

- Flag of Sudan
- IOC code: SUD
- NOC: Sudan Olympic Committee

in Algiers, Algeria 11 July 2007 – 23 July 2007
- Medals: Gold 3 Silver 0 Bronze 1 Total 4

All-Africa Games appearances (overview)
- 1965; 1973; 1978; 1987–1999; 2003; 2007; 2011; 2015; 2019; 2023

Sudan competed at the 2007 All-Africa Games held in Algiers, Algeria. The country won three gold medals and one bronze medal, all in athletics.

== Medal summary ==
=== Medal table ===
Medal	Name	Sport	Event	Date
Gold	Abubakar Kaki	Athletics	Men's 800 metres	
Gold	Muna Jabir Adam	Athletics	Women's 400 metres hurdles	
Gold	Yamilé Aldama	Athletics	Women's triple jump	
Bronze	Nawal El Jack; Faiza Omar; Hind Musa; Mona Jabir Adam	Athletics	Women's 4 × 400 metres relay	

== Athletics ==
Sudan won three gold medals and one bronze medal in athletics.
