= Onnanye Ramohube =

Onnanye Ramohube (born 2 March 1979) is a retired Botswana high jumper.

He finished ninth at the 2003 All-Africa Games, fourth at the 2002 African Championships, twelfth at the 2006 Commonwealth Games and eighth at the 2006 African Championships.

His personal best is 2.25 metres, first achieved in May 2007 in Gaborone.

He was the gold medallist at the Africa Military Games in 2002.
