= Athletics at the 2011 All-Africa Games – Men's high jump =

The men's high jump event at the 2011 All-Africa Games was held on 15 September.

== Results ==
| Rank | Athlete | Nationality | 1.90 | 1.95 | 2.00 | 2.05 | 2.10 | 2.15 | 2.20 | 2.25 | 2.28 | Result | Notes |
|---|---|---|---|---|---|---|---|---|---|---|---|---|---|
| 1st place, gold medalist(s) | Ali Mohd Younes Idriss | Sudan | – | – | – | o | o | xo | xxo | xo | xxx | 2.25 | |
| 2nd place, silver medalist(s) | Kabelo Kgosiemang | Botswana | – | – | – | o | o | xo | o | xxx | | 2.20 | |
| 3rd place, bronze medalist(s) | William Woodcock | Seychelles | – | – | o | o | xxo | o | xxx | | | 2.15 | |
| 4 | Fernand Djoumessi | Cameroon | – | – | o | o | o | xxo | xxx | | | 2.15 | |
| 5 | Raoul Matongo | Cameroon | – | – | o | xo | ? | xxx | | | | 2.10 | |
| 6 | Masanga Mekombo | Democratic Republic of the Congo | o | o | o | xo | xxx | | | | | 2.05 | |
| 7 | Jah Bennett | Liberia | – | – | xo | xxo | xxx | | | | | 2.05 | |
| 8 | Gobe Takobona | Botswana | o | o | o | xxx | | | | | | 2.00 | |
| 9 | Bayo Adio | Nigeria | o | – | xo | xxx | | | | | | 2.00 | |
| 9 | Ulika Costa | Angola | – | – | xo | xxx | | | | | | 2.00 | |
| 11 | Chambals Chambals | Mozambique | xo | xo | xxo | xxx | | | | | | 2.00 | |
| 12 | Romain Akpo | Benin | xo | xxx | | | | | | | | 1.90 | |
