= Boubacar Séré =

Burkinabé high jumper

Medal record

Men's athletics

Representing Burkina Faso

African Championships
Silver medal – second place	2004 Brazzaville	High jump
Bronze medal – third place	2008 Addis Ababa	High jump

Boubacar Séré (born 13 May 1984) is a Burkinabé athlete competing in the high jump.

His personal best in the event is 2.22 metres, which became the national record.

== Competition record ==
Year	Competition	Venue	Position	Notes
Representing Burkina Faso
2004	African Championships	Brazzaville, Republic of the Congo	2nd	2.10 m
2005	Islamic Solidarity Games	Mecca, Saudi Arabia	3rd	2.14 m
2005	Jeux de la Francophonie	Niamey, Niger	7th	2.10 m
2006	African Championships	Bambous, Mauritius	2nd	2.22 m
2007	All-Africa Games	Algiers, Algeria	6th	2.20 m
2008	African Championships	Addis Ababa, Ethiopia	3rd	2.18 m
2012	African Championships	Porto-Novo, Benin	–	NM
