= Chris Moleya =

South African high jumper

Personal information
- Born: 27 January 1997 (age 29)

Sport
- Sport: Athletics
- Event: High jump
Medal record
Men's athletics
Representing South Africa
African Championships
Silver medal – second place	2018 Asaba	High jump

Chris Moleya (born 27 January 1997) is a South African athlete specialising in the high jump. He won a silver medal at the 2018 African Championships and a bronze at the 2015 African Games.

His personal best in the event is 2.27 metres set in Rheinau-Freistett (GER) in June 2019.

== Competition record ==
Year	Competition	Venue	Position	Notes
Representing South Africa
2015	African Games	Brazzaville, Republic of the Congo	3rd	2.22 m
2016	African Championships	Durban, South Africa	6th	2.00 m
2016	World U20 Championships	Bydgoszcz, Poland	11th	2.18 m
2018	World Cup	London, United Kingdom	4th	2.21 m
2018	African Championships	Asaba, Nigeria	2nd	2.26 m
2018	Continental Cup	Ostrava, Czech Republic	7th	2.15 m
