= 2004 African Championships in Athletics – Men's high jump =

The men's high jump event at the 2004 African Championships in Athletics was held in Brazzaville, Republic of the Congo on July 18.

== Results ==
Rank	Name	Nationality	Result	Notes
1st place, gold medalist(s)	Kabelo Mmono	Botswana	2.17	
2nd place, silver medalist(s)	Boubacar Séré	Burkina Faso	2.10	
3rd place, bronze medalist(s)	Khemraj Naiko	Mauritius	2.10	
4	Mohamed Benhadia	Algeria	2.07	
5	Idrissa N'Doye	Senegal	2.03	
6	Serge Foungtcho	Cameroon	1.99	
7	Célestin Moussamboté Kengué	Republic of the Congo	1.85	
