= Sudan at the African Games =

- Flag of Sudan
- IOC code: SUD
- NOC: Sudan Olympic Committee
- Medals: Gold 9 Silver 8 Bronze 6 Total 23

African Games appearances (overview)
- 1965; 1973; 1978; 1987–1999; 2003; 2007; 2011; 2015; 2019; 2023

Sudan has competed at several editions of the African Games.

The country did not win a medal at the 2019 African Games.

== Medal record ==
Games	Gold	Silver	Bronze	Total
1965	1	6	2	9
1973	1	1	1	3
1978	2	0	0	2
2003	0	0	2	2
2007	3	0	1	4
2011	2	0	0	2
2015	0	1	0	1
2019	0	0	0	0
Totals (8 entries)	9	8	6	23
