= 2012 African Championships in Athletics – Men's high jump =

The men's high jump at the 2012 African Championships in Athletics was held at the Stade Charles de Gaulle on 1 July.

== Medalists ==
Gold	Kabelo Kgosiemang; Botswana
Silver	Ali Mohd Younes Idriss; Sudan
Bronze	Mathieu Kiplagat Sawe; Kenya

== Records ==
Standing records prior to the 2012 African Championships in Athletics
World record	Javier Sotomayor (CUB)	2.45	Salamanca, Spain	27 July 1993
African record	Jacques Freitag (RSA)	2.38	Oudtshoorn, South Africa	5 March 2005
Championship record	Abderrahmane Hammad (ALG)	2.34	Algiers, Algeria	14 July 2000
Championship record	Kabelo Kgosiemang (BOT)	2.34	Addis Ababa, Ethiopia	4 May 2008

== Schedule ==
Date	Time	Round
1 July 2012	15:00	Final

== Results ==
=== Final ===
Rank	Athlete	Nationality	1.90	2.00	2.05	2.10	2.15	2.18	2.22	2.25	2.28	Result	Notes
1st place, gold medalist(s)	Kabelo Kgosiemang	Botswana	–	–	–	o	o	xxo	xxo	xo	xxx	2.25	
2nd place, silver medalist(s)	Ali Mohd Younes Idriss	Sudan	–	–	–	xo	o	xxx				2.15	
3rd place, bronze medalist(s)	Mathieu Kiplagat Sawe	Kenya	–	o	o	xxo	o	xxx				2.15	
4	William Woodcock	Seychelles	–	xxo	xo	o	xxx					2.10	
5	Jan Steytler	South Africa	–	o	xxx							2.00	
6	Jah Bennett	Liberia	–	xo	xxx							2.00	
7	Romain Akpo	Benin	o	xxx								1.90	
7	Manirou Dembele	Senegal	o	xxx								1.90	
	Hubert de Beer	South Africa	xxx									NM	
	Boubacar Séré	Burkina Faso	–	xxx								NM	
	Abrahams Nikiema	Burkina Faso										DNS	
	Romeo N'tia	Benin										DNS	
