= 2002 African Championships in Athletics – Men's high jump =

The men's high jump event at the 2002 African Championships in Athletics was held in Radès, Tunisia on August 7.

== Results ==
Rank	Name	Nationality	Result	Notes
1st place, gold medalist(s)	Abderrahmane Hammad	Algeria	2.25	
2nd place, silver medalist(s)	Kabelo Mmono	Botswana	2.10	
3rd place, bronze medalist(s)	Mohamed Bradai	Algeria	2.10	
4	Mohamed Bazdi	Morocco	2.05	
4	Eugéne Ernesta	Seychelles	2.05	
4	Idrissa N'Doye	Senegal	2.05	
4	Onnanye Ramohube	Botswana	2.05	
8	Iskander Jaghmoum	Tunisia	1.95	
	Ezzedine Ben Abdallah	Libya	NM	
	Koussé Koné	Mali	DNS	
