= Ray Bobrownicki =

British high jumper

Ray Bobrownicki (born 3 March 1984) is an athlete who competed for Scotland in the high jump at the 2014 Commonwealth Games in Glasgow, finishing ninth in the final with a performance of 2.21 metres (7 ft 3 in).

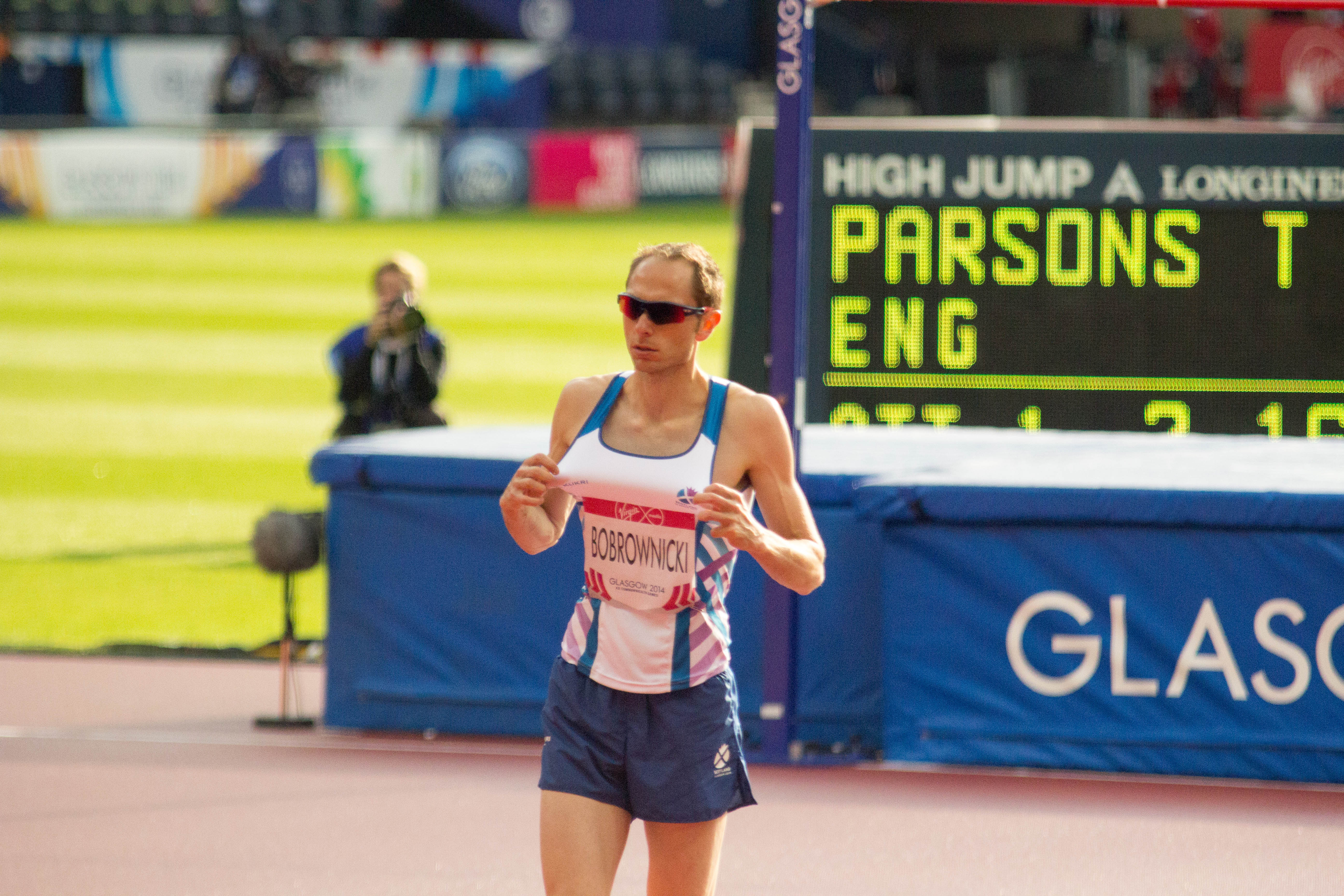
Bobrownicki at the 2014 Commonwealth Games

His personal best of 2.28 m (7 ft 6 in), achieved in 2014, ranks him twelfth on the all-time British list.

== See also ==
- Athletics at the 2014 Commonwealth Games – Men's high jump
- 2014 Commonwealth rankings in athletics
