= Athletics at the 2023 African Games – Men's high jump =

Men's high jump at the 2023 African Games
- Venue: Legon Sports Stadium
- Location: Accra, Ghana
- Dates: 22 March
- Competitors: 13 from 10 nations
- Winning height: 2.23 m

Medalists
gold medal	Cadman Evans Yamoah	Ghana
silver medal	Saad Hammouda	Morocco
bronze medal	Mpho Links	South Africa

The men's high jump event at the 2023 African Games was held on 22 March 2024 in Accra, Ghana.

== Results ==
Held on 22 March

Rank	Name	Nationality	1.90	1.95	2.00	2.05	2.10	2.13	2.16	2.19	2.21	2.23	2.25	Result	Notes
1st place, gold medalist(s)	Cadman Evans Yamoah	Ghana	–	–	–	o	o	o	o	xo	o	xxo	xxx	2.23	
2nd place, silver medalist(s)	Saad Hammouda	Morocco	–	–	–	–	xo	o	xo	xxo	o	xxx		2.21	
3rd place, bronze medalist(s)	Mpho Links	South Africa	–	–	–	o	o	xo	xo	xxo	xxo	xxx		2.21	
4	Tshwanelo Aabobe	Botswana	–	–	–	o	o	o	xo	xxo	xxx			2.19	
5	Hichem Bouhanoun	Algeria	–	–	o	o	o	o	o	xxx				2.16	
6	Kennedy Ocansey	Ghana	–	o	xo	xo	o	o	xxx					2.13	
7	Dezardin Prosper	Mauritius	o	–	o	o	xo	xxx						2.10	
8	Fiaku Ezechukwuchiri	Nigeria	o	o	xo	o	xo	xxx						2.10	
8	Ebenezer Gyimah	Ghana	o	–	o	xo	xo	xxx						2.10	
8	Keegan Fourie	South Africa	–	–	–	xo	xo	xxx						2.10	
11	Lim Koungdoup	Ethiopia	–	o	o	o	xxo	xxx						2.10	=NR
12	Daniel Nsue Martínez	Equatorial Guinea	o	xo	o	o	xxx							2.05	
13	Kemboi Asbel Kiprop	Kenya	–	–	o	xxx								2.00	
	Freddy Oyono	Cameroon												DNS	
