= Mohamed Younis Idris =

Sudanese high jumper (born 1989)

Personal information
- Nationality: Sudan
- Born: 15 September 1989 (age 36)

Sport
- Sport: Athletics
- Event: High Jump
Medal record
Men's athletics
Representing Sudan
African Games
Gold medal – first place	2011 Maputo	High jump
Silver medal – second place	2015 Brazzaville	High jump
African Championships
Silver medal – second place	2012 Porto-Novo	High jump
Bronze medal – third place	2010 Nairobi	High jump
Bronze medal – third place	2014 Marrakesh	High jump
- Updated on 26 August 2016

Mohamed Younis Idris (born 15 September 1989) is a Sudanese athlete specialising in the high jump. He represented his country at the 2013 World Championships without qualifying for the final. In addition, he has won multiple medals on regional level.

He has personal bests of 2.28 metres outdoors (Namur 2015) and 2.28 metres indoors (Bordeaux 2014). Both are current national records. He won the 2016 French Indoor Championships with 2.25 m and had close attempts at 2.29 m.

== Career ==
Mohamed Younis Idris gained his first international experience in 2005 at the Junior African Championships in Radès, where he finished fourth with a leap of 2.06m. There, he took part in the Pan-Arab Championships and finished seventh with 2.05m. The following year, he finished fifth at the Pan-Arab Junior Championships in Cairo with 2.00m. In 2007, he was fourth again at the Junior African Championships in Ouagadougou with 2.01m. At the Pan-Arab Games in Cairo, he finished tenth with 2.05m. In 2010, he competed for the first time at the African Championships in Nairobi, where he immediately won the bronze medal behind Botswana's Kabelo Kgosiemang and Raoul Matongno of Cameroon with a height of 2.15m. The following year, he won the African Games in Maputo with a leap of 2.25 m, before taking the bronze medal at the Arab Championships in al-Ain with a height of 2.13 m behind Qatar's Mutaz Essa Barshim and Majd Eddin Ghazal of Syria. He then won the silver medal at the Pan-Arab Games in Doha with 2.24m behind Barshim. In 2012, he won the silver medal behind Botswana's Kgosiemang at the African Championships in Porto-Novo with a height of 2.15m. In 2013, he won the silver medal again behind Barshim at the Arab Championships in Doha with a height of 2.24m. He was then eliminated in the qualifying round at the World Championships in Moscow with a height of 2.17m.

In 2014, he took part in the World Indoor Championships in Sopot but also missed the final there with 2.21m. He then won the bronze medal at the African Championships in Marrakesh with a leap of 2.22 m behind Kgosiemang and Cameroon's Fernand Djoumessi. The following year, he secured another silver medal behind Qatar's Barshim at the Arab Championships in Isa Town with 2.16m and then was eliminated in the qualifying round at the World Championships in Beijing with 2.17m. He then won the silver medal at the African Games in Brazzaville with a height of 2.22 m behind Botswana's Kgosiemang. In 2016, he qualified for the Olympics in Rio de Janeiro but could not compete because of a knee injury. As part of the series "Giants", a major monument by French artist JR showed Younis Idris at the Aterro do Flamengo in Rio during the Olympics. In the following years, Younis Idris hardly competed at all before finishing ninth at the 2018 African Championships in Asaba with a height of 2.00m. The following year, he competed once again at the African Games in Rabat, where he finished eighth with a leap of 2.00m.

== Competition record ==
Year	Competition	Venue	Position	Notes
Representing Sudan
2007	African Junior Championships	Ouagadougou, Burkina Faso	4th	2.01 m
2010	African Championships	Nairobi, Kenya	3rd	2.15 m
2011	All-Africa Games	Maputo, Mozambique	1st	2.25 m
2011	Arab Championships	Al Ain, United Arab Emirates	3rd	2.13 m
2011	Pan Arab Games	Doha, Qatar	2nd	2.24 m
2012	African Championships	Porto-Novo, Benin	2nd	2.15 m
2013	Arab Championships	Doha, Qatar	2nd	2.24 m
2013	World Championships	Moscow, Russia	25th (q)	2.17 m
2014	World Indoor Championships	Sopot, Poland	13th (q)	2.21 m
2014	African Championships	Marrakesh, Morocco	3rd	2.22 m
2015	Arab Championships	Isa Town, Bahrain	2nd	2.16 m
2015	World Championships	Beijing, China	35th (q)	2.17 m
2015	African Games	Brazzaville, Republic of the Congo	2nd	2.22 m
2018	African Championships	Asaba, Nigeria	9th	2.00 m
2019	African Games	Rabat, Morocco	8th	2.00 m
