= Karim Samir Lotfy =

Egyptian high jumper

Personal information
- Nationality: Egyptian
- Born: 21 April 1989

Sport
- Event: High Jump

Karim Samir Lotfy El Sayed (born 21 April 1989) is an Egyptian high jumper.

In age levels he finished eighth at the 2005 World Youth Championships, won the silver medal at the 2005 African Junior Championships, competed at the 2006 World Junior Championships and finished fourteenth at the 2008 World Junior Championships. In regional competitions he finished seventh at the 2007 All-Africa Games, fifth at the 2007 Pan Arab Games and fourth at the 2008 African Championships.

His personal best is 2.25 metres, achieved in June 2008 in Eberstadt. This is the Egyptian record.
