= Athletics at the 2019 African Games – Men's high jump =

The men's high jump event at the 2019 African Games was held on 30 August in Rabat.

== Results ==
Rank	Name	Nationality	1.90	2.00	2.10	2.15	2.20	2.23	Result	Notes
1st place, gold medalist(s)	Mpho Links	South Africa	–	–	xo	xo	xxo	xxx	2.20	
2nd place, silver medalist(s)	Mathew Sawe	Kenya	–	–	o	o	xxx		2.15	
3rd place, bronze medalist(s)	Breyton Poole	South Africa	–	o	o	xxo	xxx		2.15	
4	Aobakwe Nkobela	Botswana	o	o	o	xxx			2.10	
4	Lim Koungduop	Ethiopia	o	o	o	xxx			2.10	
4	Kabelo Kgosiemang	Botswana	–	o	o	xxx			2.10	
7	Tshwanelo Aabobe	Botswana	–	–	xo	xxx			2.10	
8	Norris Brioche	Seychelles	o	o	xxx				2.00	
8	Mieguery Kwenda	Zimbabwe	o	o	xxx				2.00	
8	Mohamed Younes Idris	Sudan	–	o	xx–	x			2.00	
11	Munyaradzi Chadenga	Zimbabwe	o	xo	xxx				2.00	
11	Noe Onadja	Burkina Faso	o	xo	xxx				2.00	
13	Omamuyovwi Erhire	Nigeria	o	xxo	xxx				2.00	
	Adire Gur	Ethiopia							DNS	
	Marouane Kacimi	Morocco							DNS	
