= Athletics at the 2015 African Games – Men's high jump =

The men's high jump event at the 2015 African Games was held on 17 September.

== Results ==
Rank	Name	Nationality	1.85	1.95	2.00	2.05	2.10	2.13	2.16	2.19	2.22	2.25	2.31	Result	Notes
1st place, gold medalist(s)	Kabelo Kgosiemang	Botswana	–	–	–	o	o	o	o	o	o	o	xxx	2.25	
2nd place, silver medalist(s)	Ali Mohd Younes Idriss	Sudan	–	–	–	–	o	–	o	xxo	o	xxx		2.22	
3rd place, bronze medalist(s)	Chris Moleya	South Africa	–	–	–	o	xo	xo	o	xo	xo	xxx		2.22	
4	Mathew Kiplagat	Kenya	–	–	–	o	o	o	o	xo	xxx			2.19	
5	Raoul Matogno Bong	Cameroon	–	o	o	o	o	o	xxx					2.13	
6	Mpho Links	South Africa	–	–	–	o	o	xo	xxx					2.13	
7	Abdoulaye Diarra	Mali	–	–	–	o	o	–	xxx					2.10	
8	Fernand Djoumessi	Cameroon	–	–	–	o	xxo	x–	xx					2.10	
9	Gobe Takobona	Botswana	–	–	o	o	xxx							2.05	
10	Jude Sidonie	Seychelles	o	o	xo	xxx								2.00	
11	Bekele Lemi	Ethiopia	–	o	xxo	xxx								2.00	
12	Daniel Nguembou	Congo	o	o	xxx									1.95	
13	Elijah Cheruiyot	Kenya	–	xo	xxx									1.95	
