= Ramsay Carelse =

South African high jumper

Medal record

Men's athletics

Representing South Africa

African Championships
Bronze medal – third place	2006 Bambous	High jump

Ramsay Carelse (born 30 October 1985) is a South African high jumper.

He was born in Somerset West, Western Cape. He finished fifth at the 2004 World Junior Championships, fifth at the 2006 Commonwealth Games and won the bronze medal at the 2006 African Championships. He also competed at the 2006 World Indoor Championships without reaching the final.

His personal best is 2.30 metres, achieved in March 2005 in Oudtshoorn.
