= Dezardin Prosper =

Mauritanian athlete (born 2000)

Personal information
- Born: Joseph Dezardin Prosper; 10 June 2000 (age 26)

Sport
- Sport: Athletics
- Events: High jump, Long jump

Achievements and titles
- Personal bests: High jump: 2.15m (Kinshasa, 2023); Triple jump: 14.44 (Montbéliard, 2019)
Medal record
Men's athletics
Representing Mauritius
Jeux de la Francophonie
Gold medal – first place	2023 Kinshasa	High jump
African U20 Championships
Bronze medal – third place	2019 Abidjan	Triple jump

Joseph Dezardin Prosper (born 10 June 2000) is an athlete from Mauritius who competes in the high jump, triple jump and long jump.

== Biography ==
In 2018, Prosper won gold in the triple jump at the CAA Southern Region Youth & Junior Championships in Ekurhuleni, South Africa. That year, he won national U20 titles in the high jump and the triple jump.

Prosper won the bronze medal at the African U20 Championships in the triple jump, and also finished fifth in the high jump at the championships.

Prosper finished seventh in the high jump at the 2022 African Championships in St Pierre, Mauritius.He won the Mauritius national championship in the high jump in 2023. Later that year, he won the high jump at the 2023 Jeux de la Francophonie in Kinshasa with a personal best clearance of 2.15m.

Prosper finished seventh in the high jump at the delayed 2023 African Games in Accra in 2024. He finished tenth at the 2024 African Championships in Athletics in the high jump, in Cameroon, in June 2024.

Prosper placed eighth at the 2026 African Championships in Athletics, with a clearance of 2.05 metres.

Prosper was selected to represent his country in the high jump at the 2026 Commonwealth Games in Glasgow, Scotland.
