= Athletics at the 2003 All-Africa Games – Men's high jump =

The men's high jump event at the 2003 All-Africa Games was held on October 15.

== Results ==
Rank	Name	Nationality	Result	Notes
1st place, gold medalist(s)	Kabelo Mmono	Botswana	2.15	
2nd place, silver medalist(s)	Jude Sidonie	Seychelles	2.10	
3rd place, bronze medalist(s)	Samson Idiata	Nigeria	2.10	
4	Khemraj Naiko	Mauritius	2.10	
4	Obiora Arinze	Nigeria	2.10	
6	Idrissa N'Doye	Senegal	2.05	
7	Muhammed Bojang	Gambia	2.05	
8	Mohamed Benhadia	Algeria	2.05	
9	Mamane Sani Abdou	Niger	2.00	
10	Onnanye Ramohube	Botswana	2.00	
