= Thabiso Maretlwaneng =

Motswana television and film producer

- Citizenship: Botswana
- Education: Swinburne University of Technology
- Occupations: Television and Film Producer
- Notable work: Head Up
- Television: Ntwagolo.

Thabiso Maretlwaneng is a Motswana television and film producer. He received an African Achievers Award in 2015.

== Life ==
Thabiso Maretlwaneng was a karate champion, and gained a sports scholarship to study at Swinburne University of Technology in Australia. As a student, he produced a feature-length documentary, Head Up, following the journey of young black refugees in Australia trying to break into the country's hip hop industry. The soundtrack for Head Up won an award at the 2009 New York International Independent Film and Video Festival.

Maretlwaneng's Botswana company Dee-Zone Productions received youth funding from the Botswana Government. It produced Ntwagolo, a 52-episode interactive docudrama looking at the impact of AIDS in Botswana. Pelokgale, a series which started airing in 2014, examined gender-based violence. An entertainment show, Pula Power, also started airing in 2014. In 2016 Dee-Zone Productions was sued over unpaid rentals.

== Filmography ==
=== Films ===
- Head Up. Documentary.

=== Television series ===
- Ntwagolo. 52-episode drama.
- Pelokgale, 2014. 26-episode drama.
