= Fernand Djoumessi =

Cameroonian high jumper (born 1989)

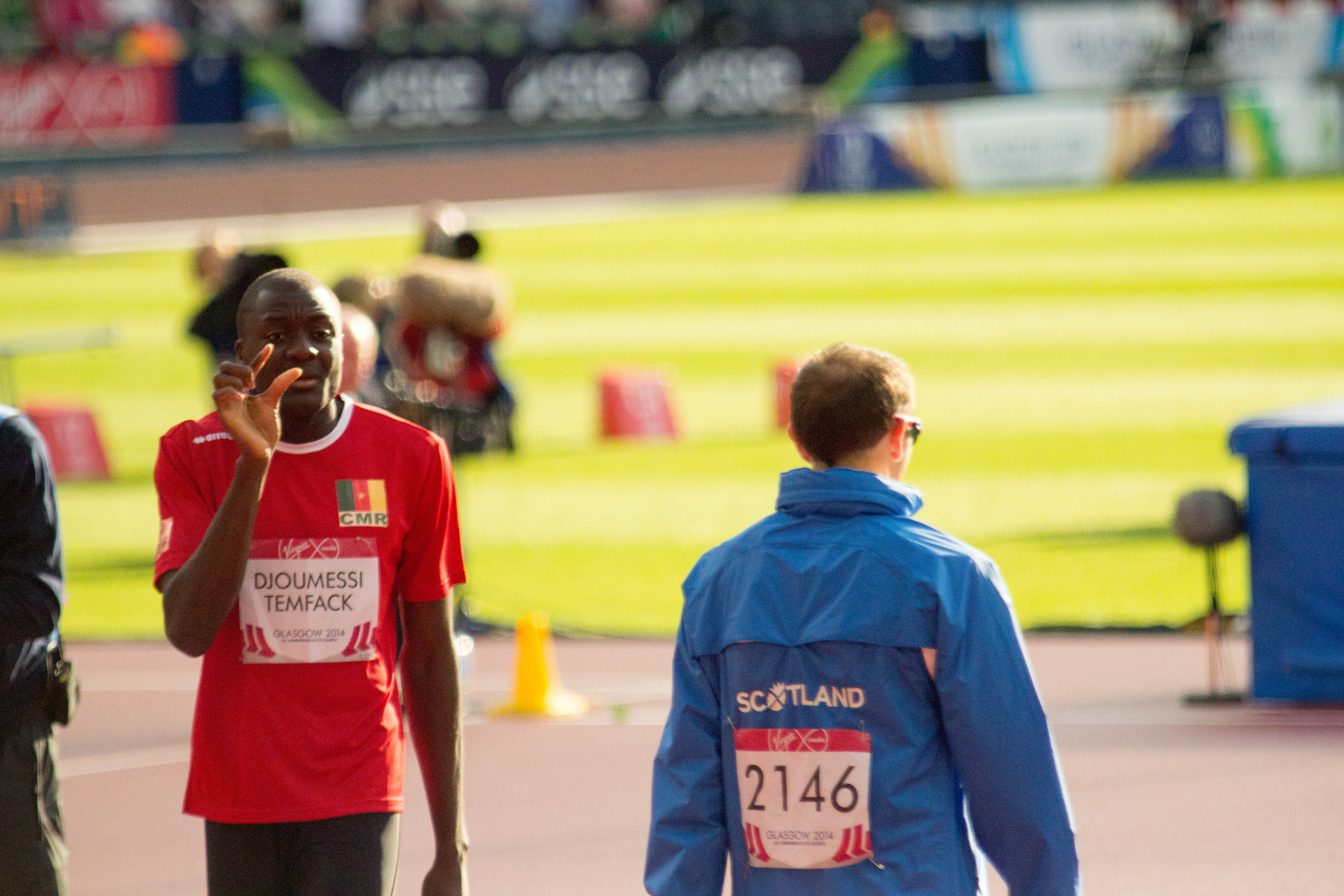
- Djoumessi at the 2014 Commonwealth Games

Personal information
- Nationality: Cameroon
- Born: 5 September 1989 (age 36)

Sport
- Sport: Athletics
- Event: High Jump
Medal record
Men's athletics
Representing Cameroon
African Championships
Silver medal – second place	2014 Marrakesh	High jump
Bronze medal – third place	2010 Nairobi	High jump
Bronze medal – third place	2016 Durban	High jump
- Updated on 27 August 2016

Fernand Djoumessi Temfack (born 5 September 1989) is a Cameroonian high jumper.

He won the bronze medal at the 2010 African Championships, finished fourth at the 2011 All-Africa Games, fourth at the 2013 Jeux de la Francophonie, seventh at the 2014 Commonwealth Games, won the silver medal at the 2014 African Championships, and finished seventh at the 2014 Continental Cup.

His personal best is 2.28 metres, achieved in June 2014 in Bühl.
