= Kabelo Kgosiemang =

Botswana high jumper (born 1986)

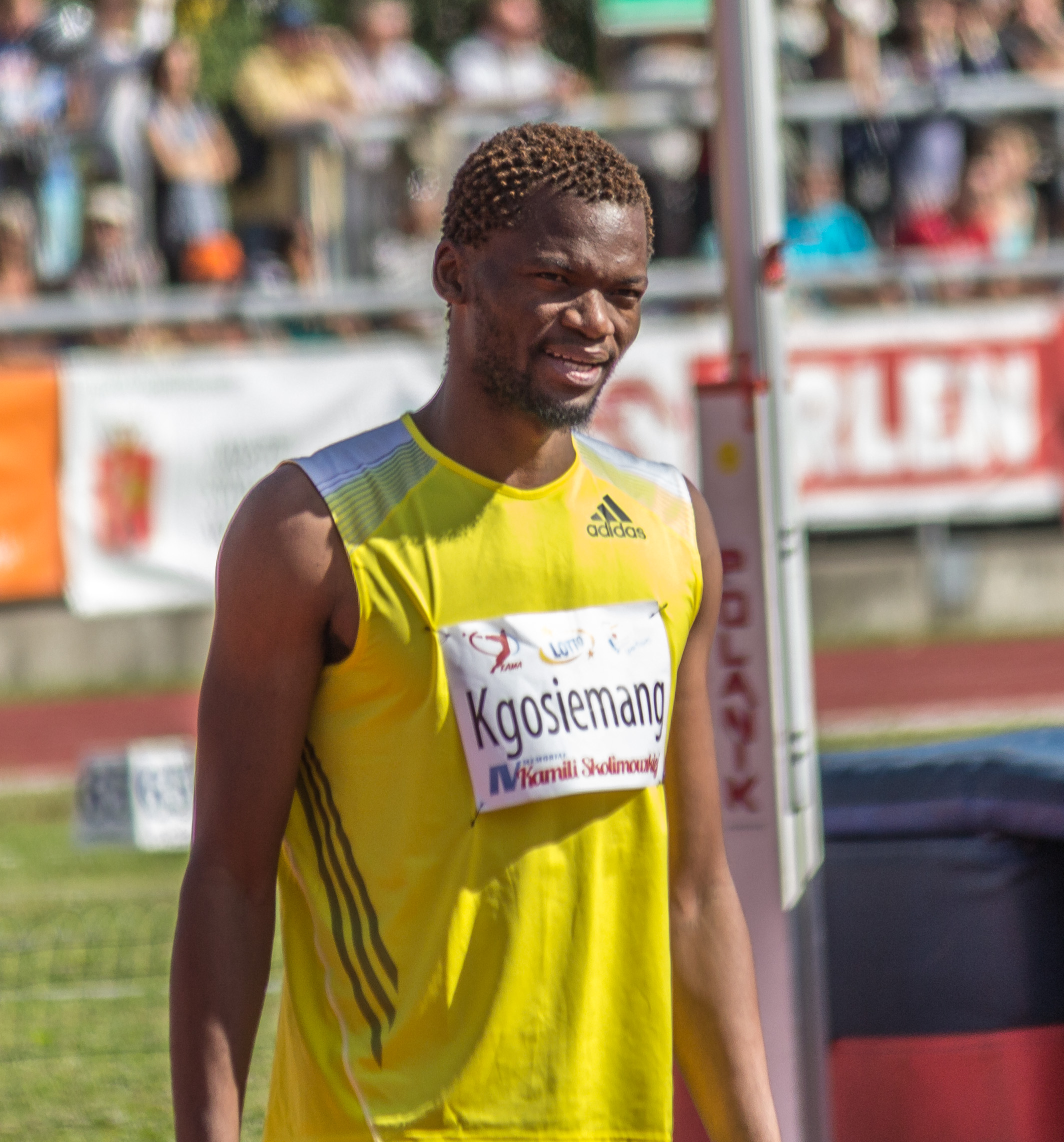
- Kabelo Kgosiemang in 2013

Medal record

Men's athletics

Representing Botswana

Commonwealth Games
Bronze medal – third place	2010 Delhi	High jump

All-Africa Games
Gold medal – first place	2007 Algiers	High jump
Gold medal – first place	2015 Brazzaville	High jump
Silver medal – second place	2011 Maputo	High jump

African Championships
Gold medal – first place	2006 Bambous	High jump
Gold medal – first place	2008 Addis Ababa	High jump
Gold medal – first place	2010 Nairobi	High jump
Gold medal – first place	2012 Porto-Novo	High jump
Gold medal – first place	2014 Marrakesh	High jump

Kabelo Kgosiemang (born 7 January 1986) is a high jumper from Botswana. He has won the high jump at the African Championships in Athletics on five consecutive occasions. His personal best, also the current national record of Botswana, was set in winning the 2008 African Championships in Athletics.

== International competitions ==
Year	Competition	Venue	Position	Notes
Representing Botswana
2005	African Junior Championships	Radès, Tunisia	1st	2.16 m
2006	African Championships	Bambous, Mauritius	1st	2.30 m (NR)
2006	World Cup	Athens, Greece	4th	2.20 m
2007	All-Africa Games	Algiers, Algeria	1st	2.27 m
2007	World Championships	Osaka, Japan	9th	2.26 m
2008	African Championships	Addis Ababa, Ethiopia	1st	2.34 m (NR)
2008	Olympic Games	Beijing, China	29th (q)	2.20 m
2009	World Championships	Berlin, Germany	13th	2.18 m
2010	African Championships	Nairobi, Kenya	1st	2.19 m
2010	Commonwealth Games	Delhi, India	3rd	2.26 m
2011	World Championships	Daegu, South Korea	25th (q)	2.21 m
2011	All-Africa Games	Maputo, Mozambique	2nd	2.20 m
2012	African Championships	Porto-Novo, Benin	1st	2.25 m
2013	World Championships	Moscow, Russia	10th	2.25 m
2014	Commonwealth Games	Glasgow, United Kingdom	5th	2.21 m
2014	African Championships	Marrakesh, Morocco	1st	2.28 m
2015	World Championships	Beijing, China	28th (q)	2.22 m
2015	African Games	Brazzaville, Republic of the Congo	1st	2.25 m
2016	African Championships	Durban, South Africa	4th	2.10 m
2019	African Games	Rabat, Morocco	4th	2.10 m

== See also ==
- Sport in Botswana
