= 2023 World Athletics Championships – Men's high jump =

Men's high jump at the 2023 World Championships
- Venue: National Athletics Centre
- Dates: 20 August (qualification); 22 August (final)
- Competitors: 36 from 26 nations
- Winning height: 2.36

Medalists
gold medal	Gianmarco Tamberi	Italy
silver medal	JuVaughn Harrison	United States
bronze medal	Mutaz Barsham	Qatar

The men's high jump at the 2023 World Athletics Championships is being held at the National Athletics Centre in Budapest on 20 and 22 August 2023.

== Summary ==
Including the fabled win at home in 2019, Mutaz Barsham came in as a three time defending champion. He had also famously shared the 2020 Olympic gold with Gianmarco Tamberi who was also here.

Returning silver medalist Woo Sang-hyeok had a perfect round going to 2.29m. JuVaughn Harrison was also perfect and maintained that status to the next height of 2.33m putting him into the lead. Woo could go no higher, but five others did get over, all but Tobias Potye on their first attempt, leaving Potye in fifth. For Luis Enrique Zayas, it was a new personal best. The next height was 2.36 m (7 ft 8 3/4 in). After watching everyone miss their first attempt, Tamberi cleared it cleanly to take the lead. On his second attempt, Harrison also cleared cleanly. When the remaining competitors failed, Barshim with one earlier miss took bronze over Zayas who had three. Both Tamberi and Harrison took attempts at 2.38m but neither could negotiate it on this night. That one miss at 2.36m costing Harrison the gold, leaving it to Tamberi.

== Records ==
Before the competition records were as follows:

Record	Athlete & Nat.	Perf.	Location	Date
World record	Javier Sotomayor (CUB)	2.45 m	Salamanca, Spain	27 July 1993
Championship record	Bohdan Bondarenko (UKR)	2.41 m	Moscow, Russia	15 August 2013
World Leading	Mutaz Barsham (QAT)	2.36 m	Chorzów, Poland	16 July 2023
African Record	Jacques Freitag (RSA)	2.38 m	Oudtshoorn, South Africa	5 March 2005
Asian Record	Mutaz Barsham (QAT)	2.43 m	Brussels, Belgium	5 September 2014
North, Central American and Caribbean record	Javier Sotomayor (CUB)	2.45 m	Salamanca, Spain	27 July 1993
South American Record	Gilmar Mayo (COL)	2.33 m	Pereira, Colombia	17 October 1994
European Record	Patrik Sjöberg (SWE)	2.42 m	Stockholm, Sweden	30 June 1987
Oceanian record	Tim Forsyth (AUS)	2.36 m	Melbourne, Australia	2 March 1997
Oceanian record	Brandon Starc (AUS)	2.36 m	Eberstadt, Germany	26 August 2018

== Qualification standard ==
The standard to qualify automatically for entry was 2.32 m.

== Schedule ==
The event schedule, in local time (UTC+2), was as follows:

Date	Time	Round
20 August	10:35	Qualification
22 August	19:58	Final

== Results ==
=== Qualification ===
Qualification: 2.30 m (Q) or at least 12 best performers (q).

Rank	Group	Name	Nationality	2.14	2.18	2.22	2.25	2.28	2.30	Mark	Notes
1	A	JuVaughn Harrison	United States	–	o	o	o	o		2.28	q
1	B	Mutaz Barsham	Qatar	–	–	o	o	o		2.28	q
1	A	Ryoichi Akamatsu	Japan	o	o	o	o	o		2.28	q
4	A	Woo Sang-hyeok	South Korea	o	o	o	xo	o		2.28	q
5	A	Oleh Doroshchuk	Ukraine	o	o	o	xo	xo		2.28	q, PB
6	B	Andrii Protsenko	Ukraine	o	xo	o	xxo	xo		2.28	q
6	A	Marco Fassinotti	Italy	xo	xo	o	xo	xo		2.28	q, SB
8	B	Tobias Potye	Germany	o	o	o	o	xxo		2.28	q
9	A	Gianmarco Tamberi	Italy	–	–	o	xo	xxo		2.28	q
10	B	Brandon Starc	Australia	o	xo	xo	o	xxo		2.28	q
11	A	Shelby McEwen	United States	xo	o	xxo	o	xxo		2.28	q, SB
12	B	Luis Enrique Zayas	Cuba	–	xxo	o	xxo	xxo		2.28	q
12	B	Norbert Kobielski	Poland	o	o	xxo	xxo	xxo		2.28	q, SB
14	B	Edgar Rivera	Mexico	o	o	o	o	xxx		2.25	
15	A	Thomas Carmoy	Belgium	o	xxo	xo	o	xxx		2.25	
16	B	Fernando Ferreira	Brazil	o	xxo	xxo	o	xxx		2.25	SB
16	A	Donald Thomas	Bahamas	xo	xo	xxo	o	xxx		2.25	
18	B	Naoto Hasegawa	Japan	o	o	xxo	xxo	xxx		2.25	SB
19	B	Hamish Kerr	New Zealand	-	o	o	xxx			2.22	
20	A	Douwe Amels	Netherlands	xo	o	o	xxx			2.22	
20	B	Sarvesh Anil Kushare	India	o	xo	o	xxx			2.22	
22	A	Romaine Beckford	Jamaica	o	xxo	o	xxx			2.22	
23	A	Alperen Acet	Turkey	o	o	xo	xxx			2.22	
23	B	Slavko Stević	Serbia	o	o	xo	xxx			2.22	
25	B	Luis Castro	Puerto Rico	xo	xo	xo	xxx			2.22	
26	B	Stefano Sottile	Italy	o	o	xxo	xxx			2.22	
27	B	Django Lovett	Canada	xo	o	xo	x-	xx		2.22	SB
28	A	Dmytro Nikitin	Ukraine	o	o	xxx				2.18	
28	A	Erik Portillo	Mexico	o	o	xxx				2.18	
28	A	Tihomir Ivanov	Bulgaria	o	o	xxx				2.18	
31	B	Tomohiro Shinno	Japan	xo	o	xxx				2.18	
32	A	Gergely Török	Hungary	o	xxx					2.14	
32	A	Hichem Bouhanoun	Algeria	o	xxx					2.14	
32	A	Joel Baden	Australia	o	xxx					2.14	
32	B	Vernon Turner	United States	o	–	xxx				2.14	
–	B	Carlos Layoy	Argentina	xxx						NM	

=== Final ===
The final was started on 22 August at 19:58.

Rank	Name	Nationality	2.20	2.25	2.29	2.33	2.36	2.38	2.40	Mark	Notes
1st place, gold medalist(s)	Gianmarco Tamberi	Italy	-	xo	o	o	o	xx-	x	2.36	=WL
2nd place, silver medalist(s)	JuVaughn Harrison	United States	-	o	o	o	xo	xxx		2.36	=WL
3rd place, bronze medalist(s)	Mutaz Barsham	Qatar	-	xo	o	o	xxx			2.33	
4	Luis Enrique Zayas	Cuba	xo	xo	xo	o	xxx			2.33	PB
5	Tobias Potye	Germany	o	xo	o	xo	xxx			2.33	
6	Woo Sang-hyeok	South Korea	o	o	o	x-	xx			2.29	
7	Shelby McEwen	United States	o	xo	xxo	xx-	x			2.29	SB
8	Ryoichi Akamatsu	Japan	o	o	xxx					2.25	
8	Brandon Starc	Australia	o	o	xxx					2.25	
10	Norbert Kobielski	Poland	o	xo	xxx					2.25	
11	Andrii Protsenko	Ukraine	o	xxo	xxx					2.25	
12	Marco Fassinotti	Italy	xo	xxx						2.20	
13	Oleh Doroshchuk	Ukraine	xxo	xxx						2.20	
