= 2025 Golden Gala =

Athletics meeting in Rome, Italy

- Dates: 6 June
- Host city: Rome, Italy
- Venue: Stadio Olimpico
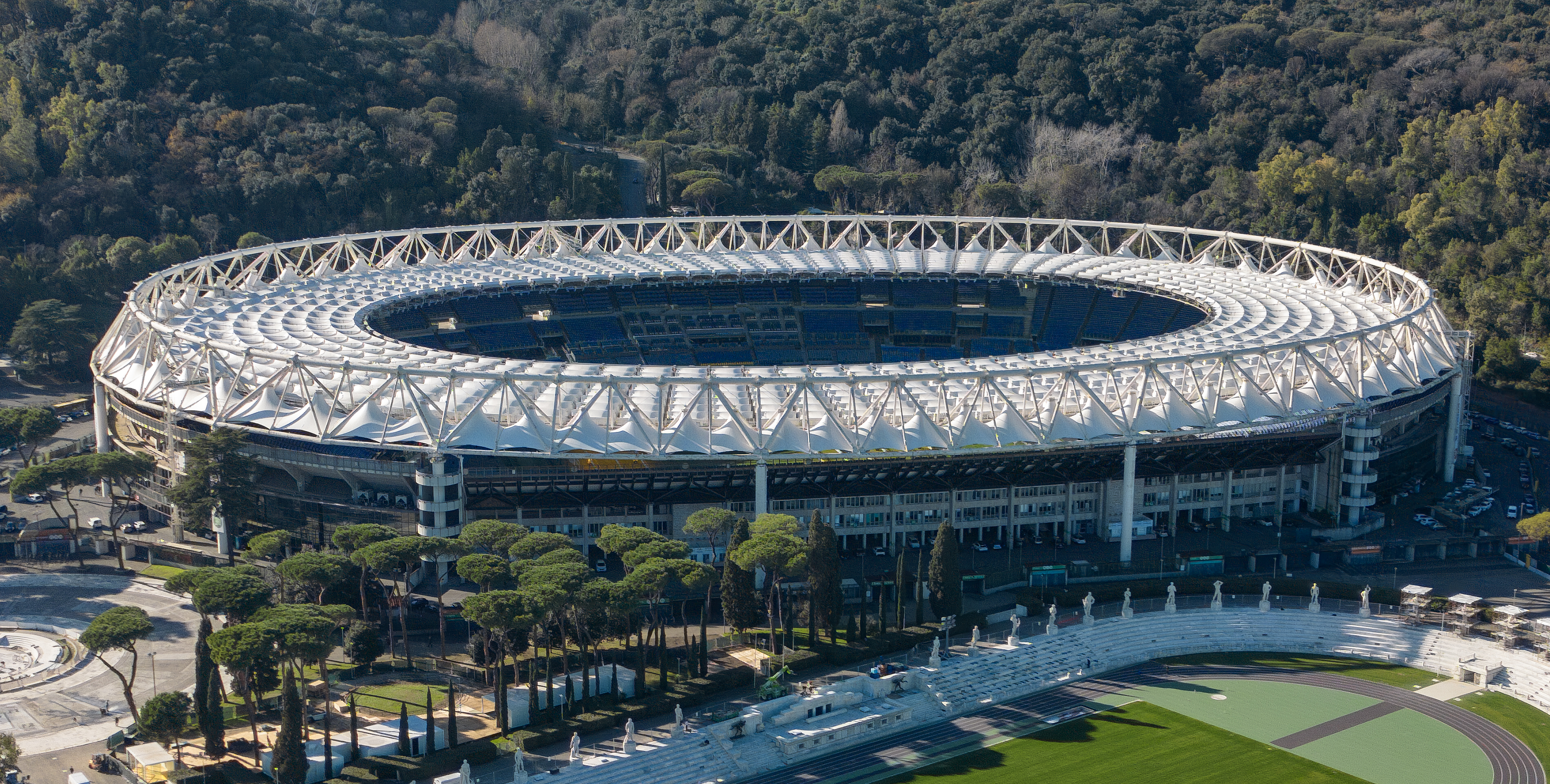
- Level: 2025 Diamond League

The 2025 Golden Gala was the 45th edition of the annual outdoor track and field meeting in Italy. Held on 6 June at the Stadio Olimpico in Rome, it was the fifth leg of the 2025 Diamond League – the highest level international track and field circuit.

== Diamond+ events results ==
Starting in 2025 a new discipline of events was added called Diamond+, these 4 events per meet awarded athletes with increased prize money whilst keeping the standard points format to qualify for the Diamond league finals. First place earns 8 points, with each step down in place earning one less point than the previous, until no points are awarded in 9th place or lower. In the case of a tie, each tying athlete earns the full amount of points for the place.

=== Men's ===
100 metres
Place	Athlete	Nation	Time	Points	Notes
1st place, gold medalist(s)	Trayvon Bromell	United States	9.84	8	WL
2nd place, silver medalist(s)	Emmanuel Eseme	Cameroon	9.99	7	SB
3rd place, bronze medalist(s)	Ferdinand Omanyala	Kenya	10.01	6	
4	Brandon Hicklin	United States	10.04	5	
5	Courtney Lindsey	United States	10.18	3	
6	Filippo Tortu	Italy	10.19	2	
7	Abdul Hakim Sani Brown	Japan	10.31	1	
8	Chituru Ali	Italy	11.21		
	Fred Kerley	United States	~~10.06~~	~~4~~	DSQ
			(+1.1 m/s)		

High jump
Place	Athlete	Nation	Height	Points	Notes
1st place, gold medalist(s)	Woo Sang-hyeok	South Korea	2.32 m	8	SB
2nd place, silver medalist(s)	Oleh Doroshchuk	Ukraine	2.30 m	7	
3rd place, bronze medalist(s)	Romaine Beckford	Jamaica	2.26 m	6	SB
4	JuVaughn Harrison	United States	2.26 m	5	SB
5	Matteo Sioli	Italy	2.23 m	4	
6	Hamish Kerr	New Zealand	2.20 m	3	
7	Manuel Lando	Italy	2.20 m	2	
8	Jan Štefela	Czech Republic	2.20 m	1	
9	Stefano Sottile	Italy	2.20 m		
10	Gianmarco Tamberi	Italy	2.16 m		
11	Raymond Richards	Jamaica	2.12 m		

=== Women's ===
1500 metres
Place	Athlete	Nation	Time	Points	Notes
1st place, gold medalist(s)	Sarah Healy	Ireland	3:59.17	8	SB
2nd place, silver medalist(s)	Sarah Billings	Australia	3:59.24	7	PB
3rd place, bronze medalist(s)	Abbey Caldwell	Australia	3:59.32	6	PB
4	Heather MacLean	United States	3:59.71	5	
5	Susan Ejore	Kenya	3:59.73	4	SB
6	Águeda Marqués	Spain	4:00.57	3	SB
7	Agathe Guillemot	France	4:01.49	2	SB
8	Marta Zenoni	Italy	4:01.52	1	PB
9	Weronika Lizakowska	Poland	4:01.70		SB
10	Saron Berhe	Ethiopia	4:01.78		
11	Katie Snowden	Great Britain	4:02.02		SB
12	Revée Walcott-Nolan	Great Britain	4:02.28		SB
13	Hirut Meshesha	Ethiopia	4:03.60		
14	Nozomi Tanaka	Japan	4:05.08		SB
15	Sintayehu Vissa	Italy	4:08.49		
—	Purity Chepkirui	Kenya	DNF		PM

5000 metres
Place	Athlete	Nation	Time	Points	Notes
1st place, gold medalist(s)	Beatrice Chebet	Kenya	14:03.69	8	NR, MR, WL
2nd place, silver medalist(s)	Freweyni Hailu	Ethiopia	14:19.33	7	PB
3rd place, bronze medalist(s)	Nadia Battocletti	Italy	14:23.15	6	NR
4	Birke Haylom	Ethiopia	14:24.20	5	SB
5	Gudaf Tsegay	Ethiopia	14:24.86	4	SB
6	Josette Andrews	United States	14:25.37	3	PB
7	Chaltu Dida	Ethiopia	14:27.11	2	PB
8	Aleshign Baweke	Ethiopia	14:27.33	1	
9	Asayech Ayichew	Ethiopia	14:38.78		
10	Shelby Houlihan	United States	14:45.29		
11	Marta García	Spain	14:47.18		
12	Maureen Koster	Netherlands	14:47.31		
13	Sarah Madeleine	France	14:48.79		PB
14	Francine Niyomukunzi	Burundi	14:49.89		SB
15	Margaret Akidor	Kenya	14:52.00		PM
16	Karissa Schweizer	United States	14:56.38		
17	Megan Keith	Great Britain	15:16.91		
—	Winnie Nanyondo	Uganda	DNF		PM

== Diamond events results ==
=== Men's ===
400 metres
Place	Athlete	Nation	Time	Points	Notes
1st place, gold medalist(s)	Quincy Hall	United States	44.22	8	SB
2nd place, silver medalist(s)	Zakithi Nene	South Africa	44.23	7	
3rd place, bronze medalist(s)	Busang Kebinatshipi	Botswana	44.51	6	SB
4	Charlie Dobson	Great Britain	44.64	5	
5	Vernon Norwood	United States	44.86	4	
6	Kirani James	Grenada	44.92	3	
7	Alexander Doom	Belgium	45.60	2	
8	Edoardo Scotti	Italy	45.68	1	SB

1500 metres
Place	Athlete	Nation	Time	Points	Notes
1st place, gold medalist(s)	Azeddine Habz	France	3:29.72	8	SB
2nd place, silver medalist(s)	Timothy Cheruiyot	Kenya	3:29.75	7	SB
3rd place, bronze medalist(s)	Anass Essayi	Morocco	3:30.74	6	PB
4	Robert Farken	Germany	3:30.80	5	NR
5	Samuel Pihlström	Sweden	3:30.87	4	NR
6	Reynold Cheruiyot	Kenya	3:30.94	3	SB
7	Elliot Giles	Great Britain	3:31.13	2	SB
8	Brian Komen	Kenya	3:31.14	1	SB
9	Oliver Hoare	Australia	3:31.15		SB
10	Federico Riva	Italy	3:31.42		PB
11	Anas Chaoudar	France	3:31.58		NU23R
12	Vincent Ciattei	United States	3:31.69		PB
13	Adrián Ben	Spain	3:32.07		PB
14	Cathal Doyle	Ireland	3:32.15		PB
15	Filip Rak	Poland	3:32.53		NU23R
16	Ignacio Fontes	Spain	3:32.55		PB
—	Žan Rudolf	Slovenia	DNF		PM

110 metres hurdles
Place	Athlete	Nation	Time	Points	Notes
1st place, gold medalist(s)	Jason Joseph	Switzerland	13.14 [.131]	8	SB
2nd place, silver medalist(s)	Cordell Tinch	United States	13.14 [.134]	7	
3rd place, bronze medalist(s)	Dylan Beard	United States	13.28	6	
4	Orlando Bennett	Jamaica	13.29	5	SB
5	Daniel Roberts	United States	13.40	4	
6	Wilhem Belocian	France	13.44	3	SB
7	Erwann Cinna	France	13.56	2	
8	Omar McLeod	Jamaica	13.58	1	
9	Asier Martínez	Spain	13.68		
			(+0.9 m/s)		

Long jump
Place	Athlete	Nation	Distance	Points	Notes
1st place, gold medalist(s)	Liam Adcock	Australia	8.34 m (−0.2 m/s)	8	PB
2nd place, silver medalist(s)	Mattia Furlani	Italy	8.13 m (−0.5 m/s)	7	
3rd place, bronze medalist(s)	Miltiadis Tentoglou	Greece	8.10 m (−0.3 m/s)	6	
4	Lester Lescay	Spain	8.06 m (−0.3 m/s)	5	
5	Carey McLeod	Jamaica	8.01 m (−0.4 m/s)	4	
6	Simon Ehammer	Switzerland	7.85 m (−0.6 m/s)	3	
7	Simon Batz	Germany	7.84 m (−0.3 m/s)	2	
8	Thobias Montler	Sweden	7.79 m (−0.2 m/s)	1	
9	Marquis Dendy	United States	7.72 m (±0.0 m/s)		

Shot put
Place	Athlete	Nation	Distance	Points	Notes
1st place, gold medalist(s)	Tom Walsh	New Zealand	21.89 m	8	SB
2nd place, silver medalist(s)	Zane Weir	Italy	21.67 m	7	
3rd place, bronze medalist(s)	Rajindra Campbell	Jamaica	21.64 m	6	
4	Joe Kovacs	United States	21.59 m	5	SB
5	Adrian Piperi	United States	21.58 m	4	SB
6	Payton Otterdahl	United States	21.56 m	3	
7	Leonardo Fabbri	Italy	21.35 m	2	
8	Chukwuebuka Enekwechi	Nigeria	21.31 m	1	
9	Andrei Toader	Romania	20.67 m		
10	Roger Steen	United States	20.30 m		

=== Women's ===
200 metres
Place	Athlete	Nation	Time	Points	Notes
1st place, gold medalist(s)	Anavia Battle	United States	22.53	8	
2nd place, silver medalist(s)	Amy Hunt	Great Britain	22.67	7	SB
3rd place, bronze medalist(s)	Marie Josée Ta Lou-Smith	Ivory Coast	22.75	6	SB
4	McKenzie Long	United States	22.81	5	
5	Maia McCoy	Liberia	22.91	4	
6	Jessika Gbai	Ivory Coast	22.95	3	
7	Dalia Kaddari	Italy	23.12 [.111]	2	
8	Paula Sevilla	Spain	23.12 [.117]	1	SB
9	Maboundou Koné	Ivory Coast	23.30		SB
			(+0.8 m/s)		

400 metres hurdles
Place	Athlete	Nation	Time	Points	Notes
1st place, gold medalist(s)	Andrenette Knight	Jamaica	53.67	8	SB
2nd place, silver medalist(s)	Ayomide Folorunso	Italy	54.21	7	SB
3rd place, bronze medalist(s)	Rushell Clayton	Jamaica	54.31	6	SB
4	Lina Nielsen	Great Britain	54.66	5	SB
5	Louise Maraval	France	54.86	4	
6	Zenéy Geldenhuys	South Africa	55.29	3	
7	Shiann Salmon	Jamaica	55.47	2	
8	Linda Olivieri	Italy	56.06	1	
9	Cassandra Tate	United States	56.15		

Pole vault
Place	Athlete	Nation	Height	Points	Notes
1st place, gold medalist(s)	Sandi Morris	United States	4.80 m	8	SB
2nd place, silver medalist(s)	Roberta Bruni	Italy	4.65 m	7	
2nd place, silver medalist(s)	Gabriela Leon	United States	4.65 m	7	
4	Marie-Julie Bonnin	France	4.50 m	5	
4	Angelica Moser	Switzerland	4.50 m	5	
4	Tina Šutej	Slovenia	4.50 m	5	
4	Amálie Švábíková	Czech Republic	4.50 m	5	
8	Imogen Ayris	New Zealand	4.50 m	1	
9	Elisa Molinarolo	Italy	4.35 m		

Triple jump
Place	Athlete	Nation	Distance	Points	Notes
1st place, gold medalist(s)	Shanieka Ricketts	Jamaica	14.64 m (−0.7 m/s)	8	SB
2nd place, silver medalist(s)	Leyanis Pérez	Cuba	14.46 m (−0.8 m/s)	7	
3rd place, bronze medalist(s)	Thea LaFond	Dominica	14.30 m (−0.1 m/s)	6	
4	Liadagmis Povea	Cuba	14.17 m (−0.7 m/s)	5	
5	Jasmine Moore	United States	14.15 m (+0.6 m/s)	4	SB
6	Neja Filipič	Slovenia	13.84 m (+0.6 m/s)	3	
7	Diana Ana Maria Ion	Romania	13.76 m (−0.5 m/s)	2	
8	Ilionis Guillaume	France	13.59 m (+1.0 m/s)	1	
9	Ana Peleteiro	Spain	13.04 m (−1.0 m/s)		

Discus throw
Place	Athlete	Nation	Distance	Points	Notes
1st place, gold medalist(s)	Valarie Allman	United States	69.21 m	8	MR
2nd place, silver medalist(s)	Yaime Perez	Cuba	66.63 m	7	
3rd place, bronze medalist(s)	Jorinde van Klinken	Netherlands	65.77 m	6	
4	Sandra Elkasević	Croatia	64.91 m	5	
5	Marike Steinacker	Germany	64.78 m	4	SB
6	Feng Bin	China	64.19 m	3	SB
7	Kristin Pudenz	Germany	64.12 m	2	
8	Laulauga Tausaga	United States	62.68 m	1	
9	Mélina Robert-Michon	France	59.88 m		
10	Daisy Osakue	Italy	56.40 m		

== See also ==
- 2025 Diamond League
