= Tyus Wilson =

American athlete (born 2002)

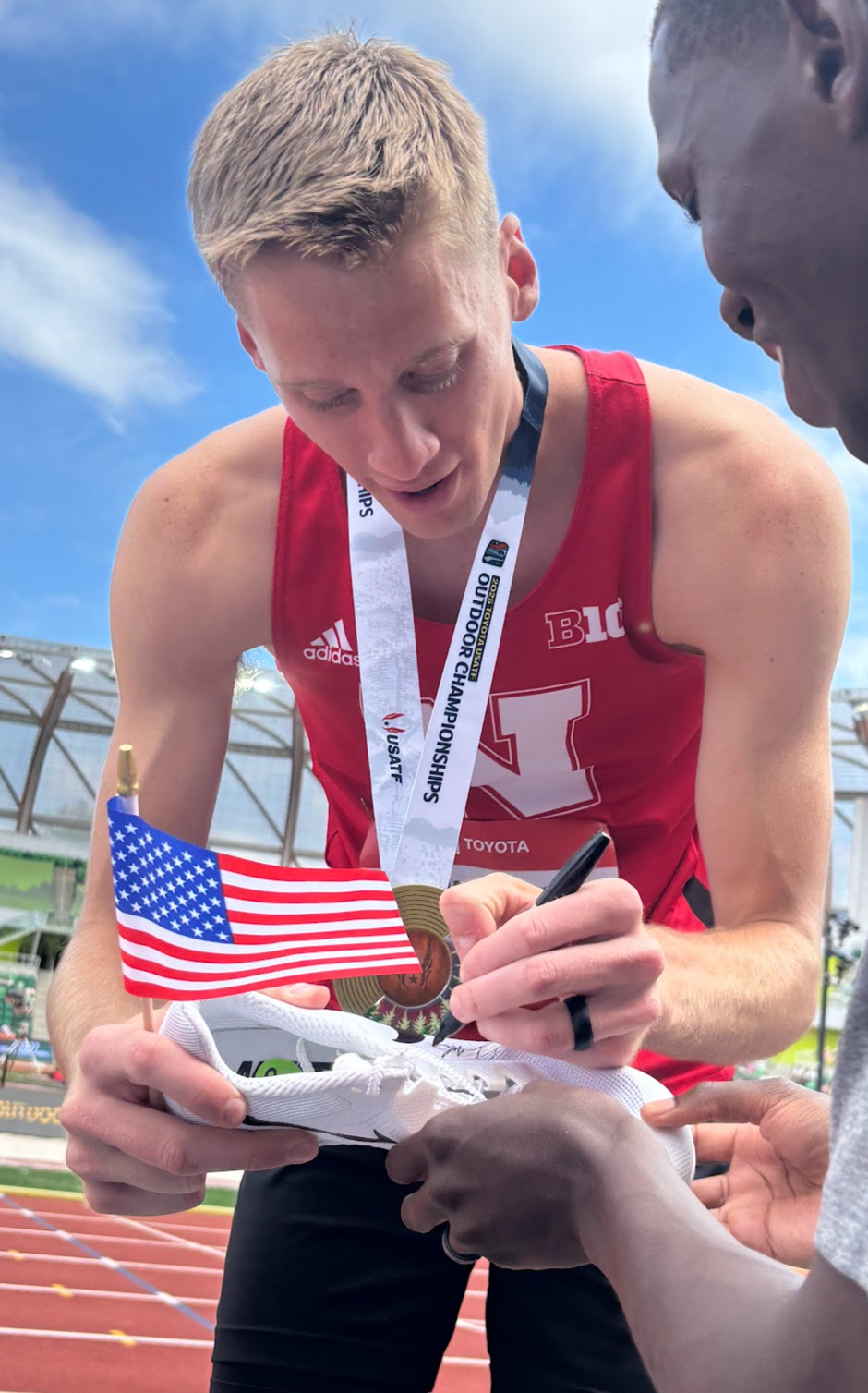
- Wilson signing an autograph for a fan at the 2025 USA Outdoor Track and Field Championships

Personal information
- Born: 5 November 2002 (age 23)

Sport
- Sport: Athletics
- Event: High jump

Achievements and titles
- Personal best: High Jump 2.29 m (2024)
Medal record
Athletics
Representing United States
NACAC Championships
Gold medal – first place	2025 Freeport	High jump

Tyus Wilson (born 5 November 2002) is an American high jumper. He won the high jump titles at the 2025 and 2026 USA Outdoor Track and Field Championships.

== Early life ==
From Sterling, Kansas, he attended Sterling High School. He won three Kansas state titles in the high jump while missing a potential fourth title with the COVID-19 pandemic causing the dissolution of the track and field season in his final year.

== NCAA ==
He attended the University of Nebraska–Lincoln. In June 2024, he was runner-up at the 2024 NCAA outdoor championships in Eugene, Oregon, jumping 2.23 metres to finish behind Romaine Beckford. In March 2025, he won the 2025 NCAA Division I Indoor Track and Field Championships with a best jump of 2.28 metres, in Virginia Beach. Latter that month, he was named the Big Ten Men’s Indoor Field Athlete of the Year.

In May 2025, he set a personal best 2.29 metres to win the Big Ten Conference Championship. He finished his time at Nebraska that summer as a five-time All-American, a four-time Big Ten champion and two-time Big Ten Field Athlete of the Year.

== Professional career ==
He placed third at the US Olympic Trials in June 2024 with a successful clearance of 2.24 metres, but did not meet the requirements by height or world ranking for Olympic selection, and the United States only sent two high jumpers to the Paris Olympics.

He cleared 2.27 metres to win the high jump at the 2025 USA Outdoor Track and Field Championships in Eugene, Oregon on 3 August 2025, making the height with his third and final attempt, to finish ahead of Shelby McEwen and JuVaughn Harrison. Later that month, he won the gold medal at the 2025 NACAC Championships in Freeport, The Bahamas with a jump of 2.24 metres. In September, he cleared 2.28 metres to finish joint sixth at the 2025 World Athletics Championships in Tokyo, Japan.

On 19 June 2026, Wilson placed fifth with a clearance of 2.20 metres at the 2026 Doha Diamond League. On 24 July, Wilson retained his USA national title at the 2026 USA Outdoor Track and Field Championships in New York, clearing 2.29 metres at the first attempt to win ahead of Scottie Vines.
