= 2025 Doha Diamond League =

Athletics meeting in Doha, Qatar

- Dates: 16 May 2025
- Host city: Doha, Qatar
- Venue: Suheim bin Hamad Stadium
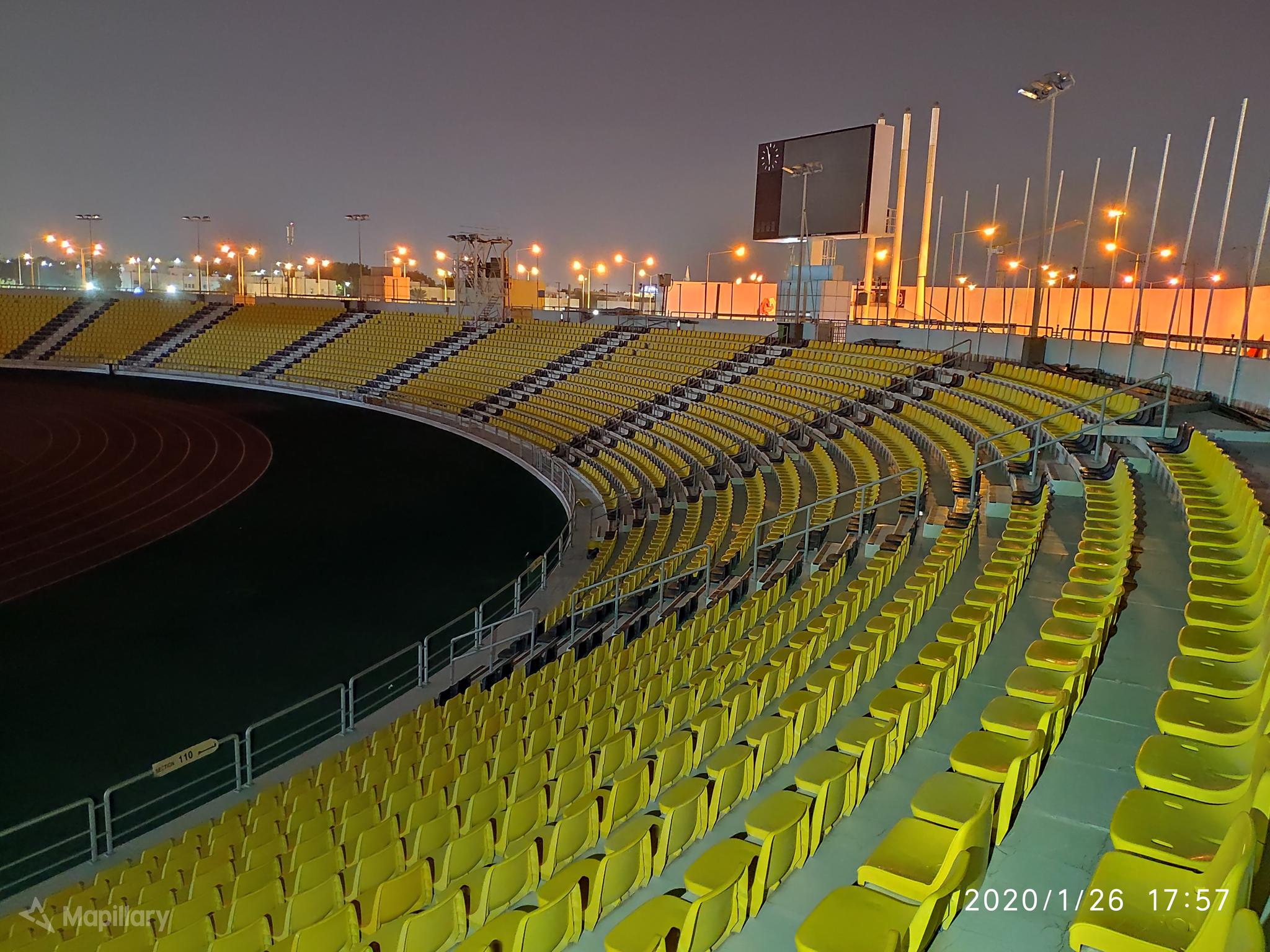
- Level: 2025 Diamond League

The 2025 Doha Diamond League was the 27th edition of the annual outdoor track and field meeting in Doha, Qatar. Held on 16 May at the Suheim bin Hamad Stadium, it was the third leg of the 2025 Diamond League – the highest level international track and field circuit.

== Diamond+ events results ==
Starting in 2025 a new discipline of events was added called Diamond+, these 4 events per meet awarded athletes with increased prize money whilst keeping the standard points format to qualify for the Diamond league finals. First place earns 8 points, with each step down in place earning one less point than the previous, until no points are awarded in 9th place or lower. In the case of a tie, each tying athlete earns the full amount of points for the place.

=== Men's ===
400 metres hurdles
Place	Athlete	Nation	Time	Points	Notes
1st place, gold medalist(s)	Alessandro Sibilio	Italy	49.32	8	SB
2nd place, silver medalist(s)	İsmail Nezir	Turkey	49.40	7	SB
3rd place, bronze medalist(s)	Matic Ian Guček	Slovenia	49.49	6	SB
4	Carl Bengtström	Sweden	49.87	5	
5	CJ Allen	United States	49.90	4	
6	Nick Smidt	Netherlands	49.99	3	
7	Berke Akçam	Turkey	50.32	2	
8	Malik James-King	Jamaica	1:03.09	1	

High jump
Place	Athlete	Nation	Height	Points	Notes
1st place, gold medalist(s)	Shelby McEwen	United States	2.26 m	8	=SB
2nd place, silver medalist(s)	Ryoichi Akamatsu	Japan	2.23 m	7	
2nd place, silver medalist(s)	Hamish Kerr	New Zealand	2.23 m	7	
4	Romaine Beckford	Jamaica	2.20 m	5	
4	Vernon Turner	United States	2.20 m	5	
6	Marco Fassinotti	Italy	2.15 m	3	
6	Raymond Richards	Jamaica	2.15 m	3	
6	Edgar Rivera	Mexico	2.15 m	3	
6	Matteo Sioli	Italy	2.15 m	3	
10	Donald Thomas	Bahamas	2.10 m		

=== Women's ===
1500 metres
Place	Athlete	Nation	Time	Points	Notes
1st place, gold medalist(s)	Nelly Chepchirchir	Kenya	4:05.00	8	SB
2nd place, silver medalist(s)	Susan Ejore	Kenya	4:06.27	7	
3rd place, bronze medalist(s)	Jemma Reekie	Great Britain	4:07.33	6	SB
4	Saron Berhe	Ethiopia	4:07.87	5	
5	Agathe Guillemot	France	4:08.77	4	
6	Elsabet Amare	Ethiopia	4:08.97	3	
7	Teresia Muthoni Gateri	Kenya	4:09.62	2	
8	Tigist Girma	Ethiopia	4:09.89	1	SB
9	Weronika Lizakowska	Poland	4:10.66		
10	Samrawit Mulugeta	Ethiopia	4:10.81		PB
11	Adelle Tracey	Jamaica	4:11.76		
12	Bayise Tolesa	Ethiopia	4:15.20		SB
13	Mebriht Mekonen	Ethiopia	4:16.35		SB
—	Khadija Benkassem	Morocco	DNF		PM

Pole vault
Place	Athlete	Nation	Height	Points	Notes
1st place, gold medalist(s)	Molly Caudery	Great Britain	4.75 m	8	
2nd place, silver medalist(s)	Roberta Bruni	Italy	4.63 m	7	
2nd place, silver medalist(s)	Katie Moon	United States	4.63 m	7	
4	Emily Grove	United States	4.63 m	5	
4	Sandi Morris	United States	4.63 m	5	SB
6	Tina Šutej	Slovenia	4.48 m	3	
7	Gabriela Leon	United States	4.48 m	2	
8	Alysha Newman	Canada	4.48 m	1	
9	Imogen Ayris	New Zealand	4.33 m		

== Diamond events results ==
=== Men's ===
200 metres
Place	Athlete	Nation	Time	Points	Notes
1st place, gold medalist(s)	Letsile Tebogo	Botswana	20.10	8	SB
2nd place, silver medalist(s)	Courtney Lindsey	United States	20.11	7	SB
3rd place, bronze medalist(s)	Joseph Fahnbulleh	Liberia	20.26	6	
4	Aaron Brown	Canada	20.35	5	SB
5	Filippo Tortu	Italy	20.41	4	SB
6	Kyree King	United States	20.61	3	SB
7	Shaun Maswanganyi	South Africa	20.78	2	SB
8	William Reais	Switzerland	20.93	1	SB
			(+0.7 m/s)		

800 metres
Place	Athlete	Nation	Time	Points	Notes
1st place, gold medalist(s)	Tshepiso Masalela	Botswana	1:43.11	8	WL
2nd place, silver medalist(s)	Bryce Hoppel	United States	1:43.26	7	SB
3rd place, bronze medalist(s)	Wyclife Kinyamal	Kenya	1:43.37	6	SB
4	Slimane Moula	Algeria	1:43.55	5	SB
5	Ibrahim Chuot	Qatar	1:44.08	4	PB
6	Andreas Kramer	Sweden	1:44.84	3	SB
7	Abdelati El Guesse	Morocco	1:45.02	2	SB
8	Aaron Cheminingwa	Kenya	1:45.21	1	SB
9	Hatim Ait Oulghazi	Qatar	1:46.22		
10	Laban Chepkwony	Kenya	1:47.00		
—	Patryk Sieradzki	Poland	DNF		PM

5000 metres
Place	Athlete	Nation	Time	Points	Notes
1st place, gold medalist(s)	Reynold Cheruiyot	Kenya	13:16.40	8	PB
2nd place, silver medalist(s)	Dominic Lokinyomo Lobalu	Switzerland	13:17.70 [.698]	7	SB
3rd place, bronze medalist(s)	Birhanu Balew	Bahrain	13:17.70 [.698]	6	SB
4	Samuel Tefera	Ethiopia	13:18.63	5	SB
5	Edwin Kurgat	Kenya	13:19.32	4	SB
6	Cornelius Kemboi	Kenya	13:20.43	3	
7	Mohamed Abdilaahi	Germany	13:20.86	2	
8	Abdullahi Jama Mahamed	Somalia	13:22.38	1	NR
9	Gulveer Singh	India	13:24.32		
10	Addisu Yihune	Ethiopia	13:35.73		SB
11	Khairi Bejiga	Ethiopia	13:36.12		SB
12	Cooper Teare	United States	13:39.16		
13	Getnet Wale	Ethiopia	13:40.28		SB
14	Adehena Kasaye	Ethiopia	13:58.59		SB
—	Mounir Akbache	France	DNF		PM
—	Boaz Kiprugut	Kenya	DNF		PM
—	Filip Sasínek	Czech Republic	DNF		PM

110 metres hurdles
Place	Athlete	Nation	Time	Points	Notes
1st place, gold medalist(s)	Rasheed Broadbell	Jamaica	13.14	8	SB
2nd place, silver medalist(s)	Jamal Britt	United States	13.25	7	
3rd place, bronze medalist(s)	Enrique Llopis	Spain	13.27	6	SB
4	Asier Martínez	Spain	13.42	5	SB
5	Lorenzo Simonelli	Italy	13.44	4	SB
6	Oumar Doudai Abakar	Qatar	13.46	3	NR
7	Daniel Roberts	United States	13.49	2	
8	Yaqoub Al-Youha	Kuwait	14.26	1	SB
			(+ m/s)		

Discus throw
Place	Athlete	Nation	Distance	Points	Notes
1st place, gold medalist(s)	Matthew Denny	Australia	68.97 m	8	
2nd place, silver medalist(s)	Daniel Ståhl	Sweden	67.06 m	7	SB
3rd place, bronze medalist(s)	Kristjan Čeh	Slovenia	66.92 m	6	SB
4	Henrik Janssen	Germany	65.79 m	5	
5	Sam Mattis	United States	65.24 m	4	
6	Lawrence Okoye	Great Britain	65.01 m	3	
7	Fedrick Dacres	Jamaica	64.81 m	2	
8	Clemens Prüfer	Germany	62.18 m	1	
9	Moaaz Mohamed Ibrahim	Qatar	57.87 m		

Javelin throw
Place	Athlete	Nation	Distance	Points	Notes
1st place, gold medalist(s)	Julian Weber	Germany	91.06 m	8	WL, PB
2nd place, silver medalist(s)	Neeraj Chopra	India	90.23 m	7	NR
3rd place, bronze medalist(s)	Anderson Peters	Grenada	85.64 m	6	SB
4	Keshorn Walcott	Trinidad and Tobago	84.65 m	5	SB
5	Ahmed Mohamed Hussein	Egypt	80.95 m	4	PB
6	Oliver Helander	Finland	79.61 m	3	SB
7	Jakub Vadlejch	Czech Republic	79.60 m	2	SB
8	Kishore Jena	India	78.60 m	1	SB
9	Julius Yego	Kenya	78.52 m		SB
10	Genki Dean	Japan	76.49 m		SB
11	Max Dehning	Germany	74.00 m		

=== Women's ===
100 metres
Place	Athlete	Nation	Time	Points	Notes
1st place, gold medalist(s)	Tia Clayton	Jamaica	10.92	8	WL
2nd place, silver medalist(s)	Tina Clayton	Jamaica	11.02	7	SB
3rd place, bronze medalist(s)	Amy Hunt	Great Britain	11.03	6	PB
4	Shelly-Ann Fraser-Pryce	Jamaica	11.05	5	SB
5	Patrizia van der Weken	Luxembourg	11.05	4	SB
6	Maia McCoy	Liberia	11.10	3	
7	Zoe Hobbs	New Zealand	11.27	2	
8	Mujinga Kambundji	Switzerland	11.49	1	SB
			(+2.0 m/s)		

400 metres
Place	Athlete	Nation	Time	Points	Notes
1st place, gold medalist(s)	Salwa Eid Naser	Bahrain	49.83	8	=MR
2nd place, silver medalist(s)	Natalia Bukowiecka	Poland	50.92	7	SB
3rd place, bronze medalist(s)	Lieke Klaver	Netherlands	51.12	6	
4	Sada Williams	Barbados	51.32	5	
5	Shafiqua Maloney	Saint Vincent and the Grenadines	51.54	4	
6	Susanne Gogl-Walli	Austria	51.91	3	SB
7	Laviai Nielsen	Great Britain	52.02	2	
8	Bakhita John Moresio	South Sudan	55.37	1	NU20R

3000 metres steeplechase
Place	Athlete	Nation	Time	Points	Notes
1st place, gold medalist(s)	Faith Cherotich	Kenya	9:05.08	8	WL
2nd place, silver medalist(s)	Winfred Yavi	Bahrain	9:05.26	7	SB
3rd place, bronze medalist(s)	Sembo Almayew	Ethiopia	9:09.27	6	SB
4	Norah Jeruto	Kazakhstan	9:11.78	5	SB
5	Marwa Bouzayani	Tunisia	9:12.13	4	SB
6	Parul Chaudhary	India	9:13.39	3	NR
7	Peruth Chemutai	Uganda	9:15.55	2	SB
8	Daisy Jepkemei	Kazakhstan	9:22.28	1	SB
9	Lomi Muleta	Ethiopia	9:22.30		SB
10	Valerie Constien	United States	9:33.19		SB
11	Olivia Gürth	Germany	9:35.21		SB
12	Cara Feain-Ryan	Australia	9:38.07		
13	Stella Rutto	Romania	9:46.90		SB
—	Ikram Ouaaziz	Morocco	DNF		PM

Triple jump
Place	Athlete	Nation	Distance	Points	Notes
1st place, gold medalist(s)	Shanieka Ricketts	Jamaica	14.72 m (+3.2 m/s)	8	
2nd place, silver medalist(s)	Thea LaFond	Dominica	14.39 m (+1.9 m/s)	7	SB
3rd place, bronze medalist(s)	Ilionis Guillaume	France	14.20 m (+3.4 m/s)	6	
4	Tuğba Danışmaz	Turkey	14.03 m (+3.3 m/s)	5	
5	Neja Filipič	Slovenia	14.02 m (+3.3 m/s)	4	
6	Senni Salminen	Finland	13.90 m (+3.1 m/s)	3	
7	Ivana Španović	Serbia	13.76 m (+1.7 m/s)	2	SB
8	Diana Ana Maria Ion	Romania	13.72 m (+2.6 m/s)	1	
9	Dovilė Kilty	Lithuania	13.60 m (+1.9 m/s)		

== See also ==
- 2025 Diamond League
