= 2025 World Athletics Championships – Men's high jump =

Men's high jump at the 2025 World Athletics Championships
- Venue: National Stadium
- Location: Tokyo, Japan
- Dates: 14 September (qualification); 16 September (final)
- Winning height: 2.36 m

Medalists
gold medal	Hamish Kerr	New Zealand
silver medal	Woo Sang-hyeok	South Korea
bronze medal	Jan Štefela	Czech Republic

The men's high jump at the 2025 World Athletics Championships was held at the National Stadium in Tokyo on 14 and 16 September 2025.

== Records ==
Before the competition records were as follows:

Record	Athlete & Nat.	Perf.	Location	Date
World record	Javier Sotomayor (CUB)	2.45 m	Salamanca, Spain	27 July 1993
Championship record	Bohdan Bondarenko (UKR)	2.41 m	Moscow, Russia	15 August 2013
World Leading	Danil Lysenko (RUS)	2.35 m	Brest, Belarus	13 July 2025
African Record	Jacques Freitag (RSA)	2.38 m	Oudtshoorn, South Africa	5 March 2005
Asian Record	Mutaz Barsham (QAT)	2.43 m	Brussels, Belgium	5 September 2014
European Record	Patrik Sjöberg (SWE)	2.42 m	Stockholm, Sweden	30 June 1987
North, Central American and Caribbean record	Javier Sotomayor (CUB)	2.45 m	Salamanca, Spain	27 July 1993
Oceanian record	Tim Forsyth (AUS)	2.36 m	Melbourne, Australia	2 March 1997
Oceanian record	Brandon Starc (AUS)	2.36 m	Eberstadt, Germany	26 August 2018
Oceanian record	Hamish Kerr (NZ)	2.36 m	Paris, France	10 August 2024
South American Record	Gilmar Mayo (COL)	2.33 m	Pereira, Colombia	17 October 1994

== Qualification standard ==
The standard to qualify automatically for entry was 2.33 m.

== Schedule ==
The event schedule, in local time (UTC+9), was as follows:

Date	Time	Round
14 September	09:00	Qualification
16 September	21:01	Final

== Results ==
=== Qualification ===
All athletes over 2.30 m ( Q ) or at least the 12 best performers ( q ) advanced to the final.

==== Group A ====
Place	Athlete	Nation	2.16	2.21	2.25	2.28	2.30	Mark	Notes
1	Oleh Doroshchuk	Ukraine	o	o	o			2.25 m	q
2	Hamish Kerr	New Zealand	o	o	xo			2.25 m	q
3	Tyus Wilson	United States	o	o	xxo			2.25 m	q
4	Thomas Carmoy	Belgium	xo	xxo	xxo			2.25 m	q
5	Romaine Beckford	Jamaica	xxo	xxo	xxo			2.25 m	q
6	Fu Chao-hsuan	Chinese Taipei	o	o	xxx			2.21 m	
6	Jonathan Kapitolnik	Israel	o	o	xxx			2.21 m	
6	Tomohiro Shinno	Japan	o	o	xxx			2.21 m	
9	Erick Portillo	Mexico	o	xo	xxx			2.21 m	
10	Shelby Mcewen	United States	o	xxo	xxx			2.21 m	
10	Donald Thomas	Bahamas	o	xxo	xxx			2.21 m	
12	Manuel Lando	Italy	o	xxx				2.16 m	
12	Stefano Sottile	Italy	o	xxx				2.16 m	
14	Vadym Kravchuk	Ukraine	xo	xxx				2.16 m	
14	Brandon Starc	Australia	xo	xxx				2.16 m	
16	Roman Anastasios	Australia	xxo	xxx				2.16 m	
—	Luis Castro Rivera	Puerto Rico	xxx					NM	

==== Group B ====
Place	Athlete	Nation	2.16	2.21	2.25	2.28	2.30	Mark	Notes
1	Ryoichi Akamatsu	Japan	o	o	o			2.25 m	q
2	Woo Sang-hyeok	South Korea	xo	o	o			2.25 m	q
3	Yuto Seko	Japan	xo	xxo	o			2.25 m	q
4	JuVaughn Harrison	United States	o	o	xo			2.25 m	q
4	Yual Reath	Australia	o	o	xo			2.25 m	q, SB
4	Jan Štefela	Czech Republic	o	o	xo			2.25 m	q
7	Sarvesh Kushare	India	xo	xo	xo			2.25 m	q
7	Matteo Sioli	Italy	o	xxo	xo			2.25 m	q
9	Edgar Rivera	Mexico	o	o	xxx			2.21 m	
10	Dmytro Nikitin	Ukraine	xo	xxo	xxx			2.21 m	
11	Juozas Baikštys	Lithuania	o	xxx				2.16 m	
11	Tihomir Ivanov	Bulgaria	o	xxx				2.16 m	
11	Tobias Potye	Germany	o	xxx				2.16 m	
11	Raymond Richards	Jamaica	o	xxx				2.16 m	
11	Gianmarco Tamberi	Italy	o	xxx				2.16 m	
16	Mateusz Kołodziejski	Poland	xo	xxx				2.16 m	
16	Thiago Moura	Brazil	xo	xxx				2.16 m	
—	Brian Raats	South Africa	xxx					NM	

=== Final ===
Place	Athlete	Nation	2.20	2.24	2.28	2.31	2.34	2.36	2.38	Mark	Notes
1st place, gold medalist(s)	Hamish Kerr	New Zealand	o	o	o	xxo	xxo	o	x	2.36 m	WL
2nd place, silver medalist(s)	Woo Sang-hyeok	South Korea	o	o	xo	xo	xxo	x–	xx	2.34 m	SB
3rd place, bronze medalist(s)	Jan Štefela	Czech Republic	o	o	xxo	xo	xxx			2.31 m	
4	Oleh Doroshchuk	Ukraine	o	o	o	xxo	xxx			2.31 m	
5	JuVaughn Harrison	United States	o	o	o	xxx				2.28 m	SB
6	Sarvesh Kushare	India	o	xo	xxo	xxx				2.28 m	PB
6	Tyus Wilson	United States	xo	o	xxo	xxx				2.28 m	SB
8	Matteo Sioli	Italy	o	xo	xxx					2.24 m	
8	Ryoichi Akamatsu	Japan	o	xo	xxx					2.24 m	
10	Yuto Seko	Japan	xo	xxx						2.20 m	
11	Yual Reath	Australia	xxo	xxx						2.20 m	
11	Thomas Carmoy	Belgium	xxo	xxx						2.20 m	
—	Romaine Beckford	Jamaica	xxx							NM	
