= 2026 World Athletics Indoor Championships – Men's high jump =

Men's high jump at the 2026 World Athletics Indoor Championships
- Venue: Kujawsko-Pomorska Arena Toruń
- Location: Toruń, Poland
- Dates: 21 March
- Competitors: 12 from 10 nations
- Winning height: 2.30 m

Medalists
gold medal	Oleh Doroshchuk	Ukraine
silver medal	Erick Portillo	Mexico
bronze medal	Raymond Richards	Jamaica
bronze medal	Woo Sang-hyeok	South Korea

The men's high jump at the 2026 World Athletics Indoor Championships took place on the short track of the Kujawsko-Pomorska Arena Toruń in Toruń, Poland, on 21 March 2026. This was the 22nd time the event was contested at the World Athletics Indoor Championships. Athletes could qualify by achieving the entry standard or by their World Athletics Ranking in the event.

== Background ==
The men's high jump was contested 21 times before 2026, at every previous edition of the World Athletics Indoor Championships.

Records before the 2026 World Athletics Indoor Championships
Record	Athlete (nation)	Height (m)	Location	Date
World record	Javier Sotomayor (CUB)	2.45	Salamanca, Spain	27 July 1993
Championship record	Javier Sotomayor (CUB)	2.43	Budapest, Hungary	4 March 1989
2026 World Lead	Danil Lysenko (RUS)	2.33	Chelyabinsk, Russia	16 January 2026

== Qualification ==
For the men's high jump, the qualification period ran from 1 November 2025 until 8 March 2026. Athletes could qualify by achieving the entry standard of 2.30 m. Athletes could also qualify by virtue of their World Athletics Ranking for the event or by virtue of their World Athletics Indoor Tour wildcard. There is a target number of 12 athletes.

== Results ==
=== Final ===
The final was held on 21 March, starting at 12:15 (UTC+1) in the morning.

Place	Athlete	Nation	2.17	2.22	2.26	2.30	2.33	2.35	Result	Notes
1st place, gold medalist(s)	Oleh Doroshchuk	Ukraine	o	o	o	o	xxx		2.30	SB
2nd place, silver medalist(s)	Erick Portillo	Mexico	o	o	xo	xxo	xxx		2.30	PB
3rd place, bronze medalist(s)	Raymond Richards	Jamaica	o	o	o	xxx			2.26	SB
3rd place, bronze medalist(s)	Woo Sang-hyeok	South Korea	o	o	o	xxx			2.26	
5	Tomohiro Shinno	Japan	o	xo	xo	xxx			2.26	
6	Jan Štefela	Czech Republic	xo	xo	xo	xxx			2.26	
7	Mateusz Kołodziejski	Poland	o	o	xxx				2.22	
8	Antonios Merlos	Greece	xo	o	xxx				2.22	
9	Younes Ayachi	Algeria	o	xo	xxx				2.22	
9	Romaine Beckford	Jamaica	o	xo	xxx				2.22	
11	Christian Falocchi	Italy	xo	xxx					2.17	
11	Naoto Hasegawa	Japan	xo	xxx					2.17	
