= Athletics at the 2024 Summer Olympics – Men's high jump =

Men's high jump at the Games of the XXXIII Olympiad
- Venue: Stade de France, Paris, France
- Date: 7 August 2024 (qualification) 10 August 2024 (final)
- Winning height: 2.36 m

Medalists
1st place, gold medalist(s)		Hamish Kerr	New Zealand
2nd place, silver medalist(s)		Shelby McEwen	United States
3rd place, bronze medalist(s)		Mutaz Essa Barshim	Qatar

Official Video

The men's high jump at the 2024 Summer Olympics was held in Paris on 7 and 10 August 2024. The event was noted for the possibility of a tied result when Hamish Kerr of New Zealand and Shelby McEwen of the United States both failed to clear 2.36 m.

In this circumstance, some athletes may choose to close the competition and share the prize. There is no compulsion for them to continue. However, in this circumstance, Kerr wished to continue.

At 2.34 m, McEwen failed while Kerr succeeded and won the competition. Kerr was awarded the Olympic gold medal, McEwen the silver medal and Mutaz Barshim of Qatar, the bronze. Gianmarco Tamberi of Italy demonstrated emotional reactions to his attempts and received crowd support but did not proceed beyond 2.22 m.

== Unforeseen circumstances ==
Some competitors were affected by illness. Tamberi had been hospitalised with pain, fever and vomiting blood prior to the event.

The competition final proceeded slowly and so some jumps were attempted during, for example, the running of races in the stadium.

== Tie break ==
Kerr wished to continue the competition rather than share first place with McEwen. McEwen jumped first and then Kerr.

The men jumped again at the height they had both just missed. Both missed again. The athletes then attempted the height they had last cleared. Again both missed. The bar was lowered to 2.34 m, still higher than the nearest competitor.

At this 14th set of attempts, McEwen missed and then Kerr cleared the bar.

== Qualification ==
Athletes qualified for the high jump event if they cleared 2.33 m or higher in the period between 1 July 2023 and 30 June 2024. An alternative path to qualification was their World Athletics Ranking.

The maximum number of entrants per nation was three. The event began with 32 athletes from 25 nations.

== Results ==
=== Preliminary round ===
On 7 August 2024, commencing at 10:05 (UTC+2), 32 athletes competed in the preliminary round. This round determined the athletes proceeding to the final by either reaching the (Q) qualification standard of 2.29 m or (q) finishing the round in the top twelve.

Rank	Group	Athlete	Nation	2.15	2.20	2.24	2.27	2.29	Height	Notes
1	A	Shelby McEwen	United States	o	–	o	o	r	2.27	q
2	B	Hamish Kerr	New Zealand	o	xxo	xo	o	r	2.27	q
3	A	Mutaz Barsham	Qatar	o	o	o	xo	r	2.27	q
3	A	Woo Sang-hyeok	South Korea	o	o	o	xo	r	2.27	q
5	A	Ryoichi Akamatsu	Japan	o	o	xxo	xo	r	2.27	q, SB
6	A	Stefano Sottile	Italy	o	o	o	xxx		2.24	q
6	B	Gianmarco Tamberi	Italy	–	o	o	xxx		2.24	q
8	B	Romaine Beckford	Jamaica	o	xo	o	xxx		2.24	q
9	A	Brian Raats	South Africa	o	xxo	o	xxx		2.24	q
9	A	Jan Štefela	Czech Republic	o	xxo	o	xxx		2.24	q
11	B	Oleh Doroshchuk	Ukraine	o	o	xo	xxx		2.24	q
12	B	Tihomir Ivanov	Bulgaria	o	xo	xo	xxx		2.24	q
13	B	Brandon Starc	Australia	xxo	xo	xo	xxx		2.24	SB
14	A	Luis Zayas	Cuba	o	o	xxo		xxx	2.24	
15	A	Luis Castro	Puerto Rico	o	o	xxx			2.20	
15	B	Fernando Ferreira	Brazil	o	o	xxx			2.20	
15	B	Erick Portillo	Mexico	o	o	xxx			2.20	
15	A	Edgar Rivera	Mexico	o	o	xxx			2.20	
19	B	Thomas Carmoy	Belgium	o	xo	xxx			2.20	
19	B	JuVaughn Harrison	United States	o	xo	xxx			2.20	
19	A	Wang Zhen	China	o	xo	xxx			2.20	
22	A	Alperen Acet	Turkey	xxo	xo	xxx			2.20	
23	B	Yual Reath	Australia	o	xxo	xxx			2.20	
23	B	Tomohiro Shinno	Japan	o	xxo	xxx			2.20	
25	B	Sarvesh Kushare	India	o	xxx				2.15	
25	A	Vladyslav Lavskyy	Ukraine	o	xxx				2.15	
27	B	Joel Baden	Australia	xo	xxx				2.15	
28	A	Vernon Turner	United States	xxo	xxx				2.15	
	A	Donald Thomas	Bahamas	xxx					NM	
	B	Tobias Potye	Germany	xxx					NM	
	B	Andriy Protsenko	Ukraine	xxx					NM	

=== Final ===
The final was held on 10 August, commencing at 19:10 (UTC+2).

Rank	Athlete	Nation	Main competition							Jump-off			Height	Notes
Rank	Athlete	Nation	2.17	2.22	2.27	2.31	2.34	2.36	2.38	2.38	2.36	2.34	Height	Notes
1st place, gold medalist(s)	Hamish Kerr	New Zealand	o	o	o	xxo	o	o	xxx	x	x	o	2.36	=AR
2nd place, silver medalist(s)	Shelby McEwen	United States	o	o	o	o	xxo	o	xxx	x	x	x	2.36	PB
3rd place, bronze medalist(s)	Mutaz Barsham	Qatar	–	o	o	o	o	xx-	x				2.34	SB
4	Stefano Sottile	Italy	o	o	o	xo	o	xxx					2.34	PB
5	Ryoichi Akamatsu	Japan	o	o	xo	o	xxx						2.31	PB
6	Oleh Doroshchuk	Ukraine	o	o	xo	xo	xxx						2.31	PB
7	Woo Sang-hyeok	South Korea	o	o	xo	xxx							2.27	
8	Tihomir Ivanov	Bulgaria	xo	o	xo	xxx							2.27	SB
9	Jan Štefela	Czech Republic	xxo	o	xxx								2.22	
10	Romaine Beckford	Jamaica	o	xo	xxx								2.22	
11	Gianmarco Tamberi	Italy	–	xxo	xxx								2.22	
12	Brian Raats	South Africa	o	xxx									2.17	
