= 2025 World Athletics Indoor Championships – Men's high jump =

Men's high jump at the 2025 World Athletics Indoor Championships
- Venue: Nanjing's Cube at Nanjing Youth Olympic Sports Park
- Location: Nanjing, China
- Dates: 21 March
- Competitors: 13 from 10 nations
- Winning height: 2.31 m

Medalists
gold medal	Woo Sang-hyeok	South Korea
silver medal	Hamish Kerr	New Zealand
bronze medal	Raymond Richards	Jamaica

The men's high jump at the 2025 World Athletics Indoor Championships took place on the short track of the Nanjing's Cube at Nanjing Youth Olympic Sports Park in Nanjing, China, on 21 March 2025. This was the 21st time the event was contested at the World Athletics Indoor Championships. Athletes could qualify by achieving the entry standard or by their World Athletics Ranking in the event.

The final took place on 21 March during the morning session.

== Background ==
The men's high jump was contested 20 times before 2025, at every previous edition of the World Athletics Indoor Championships.

Records before the 2025 World Athletics Indoor Championships
Record	Athlete (nation)	Height (m)	Location	Date
World record	Javier Sotomayor (CUB)	2.45	Salamanca, Spain	27 July 1993
Championship record	Javier Sotomayor (CUB)	2.43	Budapest, Hungary	4 March 1989
World leading	Oleh Doroshchuk (UKR)	2.34	Apeldoorn, Netherlands	8 March 2025

== Qualification ==
For the men's high jump, the qualification period ran from 1 September 2024 until 9 March 2025. Athletes could qualify by achieving the entry standards of 2.34 m. Athletes could also qualify by virtue of their World Athletics Ranking for the event or by virtue of their World Athletics Indoor Tour wildcard. There was a target number of 12 athletes.

== Final ==
The final was held on 21 March, starting at 18:30 (UTC+8).

Place	Athlete	Nation	2.14	2.20	2.24	2.28	2.31	Result	Notes
1st place, gold medalist(s)	Woo Sang-hyeok	South Korea	o	o	xo	o	o	2.31	SB
2nd place, silver medalist(s)	Hamish Kerr	New Zealand	o	o	xo	o	xxx	2.28	
3rd place, bronze medalist(s)	Raymond Richards	Jamaica	o	o	o	xo	xxx	2.28	
4	Elijah Kosiba	United States	o	o	xo	xo	xxx	2.28	SB
5	Oleh Doroshchuk	Ukraine	o	o	o	xxo	xxx	2.28	
6	Manuel Lando	Italy	o	o	xxo	xxx		2.24	
7	Naoto Hasegawa	Japan	o	xo	xxx			2.20	SB
8	Jonathan Kapitolnik	Israel	xo	xxo	xxx			2.20	
9	Romaine Beckford	Jamaica	o	xxx				2.14	
9	Luis Castro Rivera	Puerto Rico	o	xxx				2.14	
9	Dmytro Nikitin	Ukraine	o	xxx				2.14	
9	Jan Štefela	Czech Republic	o	xxx				2.14	
13	Souta Haraguchi	Japan	xo	xxx				2.14	SB
