= 2024 World Athletics Indoor Championships – Men's high jump =

Men's high jump final at 2024 World Athletics Indoor Championships

Men's high jump at the 2024 World Athletics Indoor Championships
- Venue: Commonwealth Arena
- Dates: 3 March
- Competitors: 12 from 10 nations
- Winning mark: 2.36 meter

Medalists
gold medal	Hamish Kerr	New Zealand
silver medal	Shelby McEwen	United States
bronze medal	Woo Sang-hyeok	South Korea

The men's high jump at the 2024 World Athletics Indoor Championships took place on 3 March 2024.

== Results ==
The final was started at 11.55.

Rank	Athlete	Nationality	2.15	2.20	2.24	2.28	2.31	2.34	2.36	Result	Notes
1st place, gold medalist(s)	Hamish Kerr	New Zealand	o	o	o	o	o	x–	xo	2.36	WL
2nd place, silver medalist(s)	Shelby McEwen	United States	o	–	o	xo	xx–	x		2.28	
3rd place, bronze medalist(s)	Woo Sang-hyeok	South Korea	–	o	xxo	xo	xxx			2.28	
4	Oleh Doroshchuk	Ukraine	o	o	o	xxx				2.24	
5	Jan Štefela	Czech Republic	xo	xo	o	xxx				2.24	
6	Vernon Turner	United States	o	o	xo	xxx				2.24	
7	Norbert Kobielski	Poland	xxo	o	xxo	xxx				2.24	
8	Edgar Rivera	Mexico	o	o	xxx					2.20	
9	Donald Thomas	Bahamas	o	xxx						2.15	SB
9	Ryoichi Akamatsu	Japan	o	xxx						2.15	
11	Thomas Carmoy	Belgium	xxo	xxx						2.15	
11	Andriy Protsenko	Ukraine	xxo	xxx						2.15	
