= 2022 World Athletics Indoor Championships – Men's high jump =

Men's high jump at the 2022 World Athletics Indoor Championships
- Venue: Štark Arena
- Dates: 20 March
- Competitors: 12 from 11 nations
- Winning mark: 2.34

Medalists
gold medal	Woo Sang-hyeok	South Korea
silver medal	Loïc Gasch	Switzerland
bronze medal	Gianmarco Tamberi	Italy
bronze medal	Hamish Kerr	New Zealand

The men's high jump at the 2022 World Athletics Indoor Championships took place on 20 March 2022.

== Results ==
The final was started at 10:45.

Rank	Athlete	Nationality	2.15	2.20	2.24	2.28	2.31	2.34	2.37	Result	Notes
1st place, gold medalist(s)	Woo Sang-hyeok	South Korea	–	o	o	o	xxo	o	xx–	2.34	
2nd place, silver medalist(s)	Loïc Gasch	Switzerland	o	o	o	o	xo	xxx		2.31	SB
3rd place, bronze medalist(s)	Gianmarco Tamberi	Italy	o	o	xo	o	xo	xxx		2.31	SB
3rd place, bronze medalist(s)	Hamish Kerr	New Zealand	xo	o	o	o	xo	xxx		2.31	NR
5	Thiago Moura	Brazil	o	xo	xo	xo	xo	xxx		2.31	AR
6	Thomas Carmoy	Belgium	o	o	xxo	xxo	xxx			2.28	PB
7	Fernando Ferreira	Brazil	o	o	o	xxx				2.24	SB
7	Edgar Rivera	Mexico	o	o	o	xxx				2.24	SB
9	Norbert Kobielski	Poland	o	o	xxo	xxx				2.24	
10	Darryl Sullivan Jr.	United States	xo	o	xxo	xxx				2.24	
11	Donald Thomas	Bahamas	o	xo	xxx					2.20	
12	Naoto Tobe	Japan	o	xxx						2.15	
