= Athletics at the 2020 Summer Olympics – Men's high jump =

Men's high jump at the Games of the XXXII Olympiad
- Olympic Athletics
- Venue: Olympic Stadium
- Dates: 30 July 2021 (qualifying); 1 August 2021 (final)
- Competitors: 33 from 24 nations
- Winning height: 2.37

Medalists
1st place, gold medalist(s)		Mutaz Essa Barshim	Qatar
1st place, gold medalist(s)		Gianmarco Tamberi	Italy
3rd place, bronze medalist(s)		Maksim Nedasekau	Belarus

Official Video Highlights

The men's high jump event at the 2020 Summer Olympics took place between 30 July and 1 August 2021 at the Olympic Stadium. 33 athletes from 24 nations competed; the total possible number depended on how many nations would use universality places to enter athletes in addition to the 32 qualifying through mark or ranking (no universality places were used in 2021). Italian athlete Gianmarco Tamberi and Qatari athlete Mutaz Essa Barshim emerged as joint winners of the event following a tie, as they both cleared 2.37m. Both Tamberi and Barshim agreed to share the gold medal in a rare instance of athletes of different nations agreeing to share the same medal. Barshim in particular was heard to ask a competition official "Can we have two golds?" in response to being offered a "jump-off". Maksim Nedasekau of Belarus took bronze. The medals were the first ever in the men's high jump for Italy and Belarus, the first gold in the men's high jump for Italy and Qatar, and the third consecutive medal in the men's high jump for Qatar (all by Barshim). Barshim became only the second man to earn 3 medals in high jump, joining Patrik Sjöberg of Sweden (1984–92).

== Summary ==
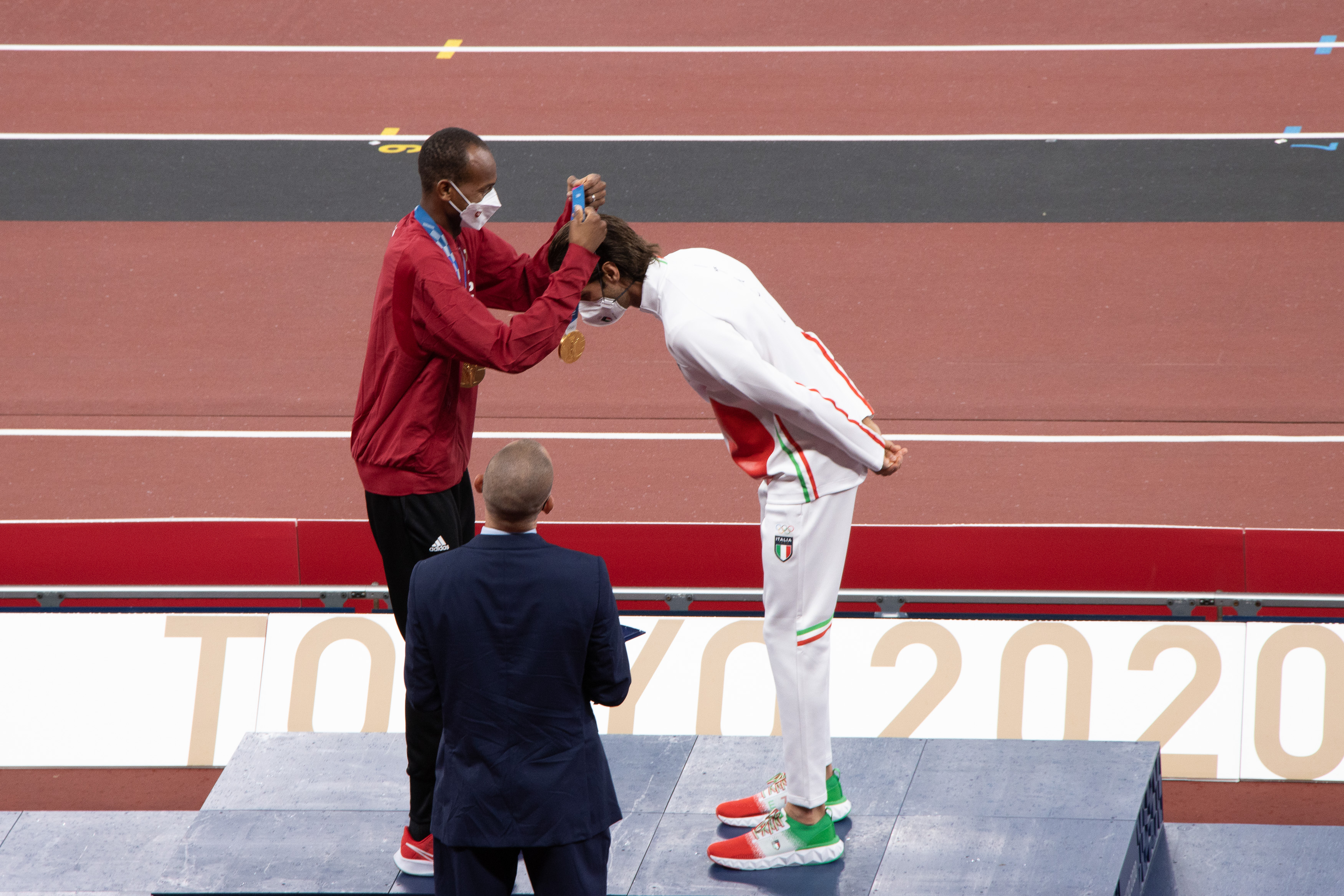
Mutaz Barshim presents high jump co-winner Gianmarco Tamberi with his gold medal at the Tokyo 2020 Olympic Games

Thirteen jumpers qualified for the final by jumping over 2.28 metres, Tom Gale was the last and only qualifier requiring three attempts at the height. In the final, ten jumpers cleared 2.30 metres, eight over 2.33 metres, and four cleared 2.35 metres on their first attempt, including Woo Sang-hyeok jumping 4 centimetres above his personal best. All the while, returning silver medalist Mutaz Essa Barshim and former world indoor champion Gianmarco Tamberi maintained a clean sheet to be tied for first place. Jumping in the first position, Barshim's perfection put pressure on the rest of the field to maintain at each new height, which only Tamberi could match. At 2.37 metres, Barshim cleared again. After missing once at 2.35 metres, Maksim Nedasekau strategically passed to 2.37 metres and made it on his first attempt. After Tamberi also cleared 2.37 metres, the 3 other athletes still in contention passed to 2.39 metres with Nedasekau holding the bronze medal position pending the results at 2.39. Nobody was able to clear 2.39 metres, confirming Nedasekau with bronze, and leaving Barshim and Tamberi tied in the lead position.

The officials offered a jump-off, but since a 2009 rule-change the jump-off is optional, so that the first place can be shared by agreement among tied athletes. Barshim asked if they could both get gold medals. The officials agreed. Close friends who had both battled back from serious injury, Tamberi and Barshim agreed to share the top step; they clasped hands, embraced and each then celebrated the gold medal. The moment between the athletes, televised live and globally, was quickly praised as an iconic moment and one of the highlights of the Games. The ethical implications of the shared gold have also been discussed by philosophers and sport ethicists, Alan C. Oldham suggesting the rule change allowing the choice creates a paradox akin to game theory's prisoner's dilemma, and Yağmur Nuhrat suggesting that the choice to share gold is an example of virtuous co-authoring of human excellence.

== Background ==
This was the 29th appearance of the event – one of 12 athletic events to have been held at every Summer Olympics.

No nations made their men's high jump debut, though Russian athletes competed as "Russian Olympic Committee" for the first time. The United States made its 28th appearance, most of any nation, having missed only the boycotted 1980 Games.

== Qualification ==
A National Olympic Committee (NOC) could enter up to 3 qualified athletes in the men's high jump event if all athletes meet the entry standard or qualify by ranking during the qualifying period. (The limit of 3 has been in place since the 1930 Olympic Congress.) The qualifying standard is 2.33 metres. This standard was "set for the sole purpose of qualifying athletes with exceptional performances unable to qualify through the IAAF World Rankings pathway." The world rankings, based on the average of the best five results for the athlete over the qualifying period and weighted by the importance of the meet, will then be used to qualify athletes until the cap of 32 is reached.

The qualifying period was originally from 1 May 2019 to 29 June 2020. Due to the COVID-19 pandemic, the period was suspended from 6 April 2020 to 30 November 2020, with the end date extended to 29 June 2021. The world rankings period start date was also changed from 1 May 2019 to 30 June 2020; athletes who had met the qualifying standard during that time were still qualified, but those using world rankings would not be able to count performances during that time. The qualifying standards could be obtained in various meetings during the given period that have the approval of the IAAF. Both outdoor and indoor meets are eligible. The most recent Area Championships may be counted in the ranking, even if not during the qualifying period.

NOCs can also use their universality place—each NOC can enter one male athlete regardless of mark if they had no male athletes meeting the entry standard for an athletics event—in the high jump, but no such place was awarded in this event.

On 29 June 2021, 16 high jumpers qualified with entry standard and 16 by ranking position.

Entry number: 32. Entry standard – 2.33 m:

Entry number (target): 32. One athlete from Belarus was lately added, post qualification period.

Qualification standard	No. of athletes	NOC	Nominated athletes
Entry standard – 2.33	3	United States	JuVaughn Harrison; Shelby McEwen; Darryl Sullivan
Entry standard – 2.33	2	Italy	Stefano Sottile; Gianmarco Tamberi
Entry standard – 2.33	2	ROC	Mikhail Akimenko; Ilya Ivanyuk
Entry standard – 2.33	1	Australia	Brandon Starc
Entry standard – 2.33	1	Bahamas	Jamal Wilson
Entry standard – 2.33	1	Belarus	Maksim Nedasekau
Entry standard – 2.33	1	Canada	Django Lovett
Entry standard – 2.33	1	Cuba	Luis Zayas
Entry standard – 2.33	1	Great Britain	Tom Gale
Entry standard – 2.33	1	Qatar	Mutaz Essa Barshim
Entry standard – 2.33	1	Switzerland	Loïc Gasch
Entry standard – 2.33	1	Ukraine	Andriy Protsenko
World ranking	2	Brazil	Fernando Ferreira; Thiago Moura
World ranking	2	Japan	Takashi Eto; Naoto Tobe
World ranking	1	Bahamas	Donald Thomas
World ranking	1	Belarus	Dzmitry Nabokau
World ranking	1	Bulgaria	Tihomir Ivanov
World ranking	1	Canada	Michael Mason
World ranking	1	China	Wang Yu
World ranking	1	Germany	Mateusz Przybylko
World ranking	1	Kenya	Mathew Sawe
World ranking	1	Lithuania	Adrijus Glebauskas
World ranking	1	Malaysia	Lee Hup Wei
World ranking	1	Mexico	Edgar Rivera
World ranking	1	New Zealand	Hamish Kerr
World ranking	1	South Korea	Woo Sang-hyeok
World ranking	1	Syria	Majd Eddin Ghazal
Total	33		

This qualification list does not include Danil Lysenko of Russia (formerly competed as ANA), 2.40 m in 2018, but since under a 6-year ban by Court of Arbitration for Sport for doping. However, the list includes all the 7 jumpers with more than the 2.33 m Entry Standard since 2019:

1. Mutaz Essa Barshim, qualified by Entry Standard: 2.37 m at Khalifa International Stadium, Doha (QAT) – on 4 October 2019
2. Maksim Nedasekau, qualified by Entry Standard: 2.37 m at Arena, Toruń (POL) – on 7 March 2021
3. Ilya Ivanyuk, qualified by Entry Standard: 2.37 m at SGAFKST Arena, Smolensk (RUS) – on 17 May 2021
4. JuVaughn Harrison, qualified by Entry Standard: 2.36 m at Cushing Stadium (Texas A&M), College Station, Texas (USA) – on 14 May 2021
5. Mikhail Akimenko, qualified by Entry Standard: 2.35 m at Khalifa International Stadium, Doha (QAT) – on 4 October 2019
6. Gianmarco Tamberi, qualified by Entry Standard: 2.35 m at Palaindoor di Ancona, Ancona (ITA) – on 21 February 2021
7. Andriy Protsenko, qualified by Entry Standard: 2.34 m at Arena, Toruń (POL) – on 17 February 2021

This list includes also all the main last major championships winners since 2018: Barshim (WCh Doha 2019), Przybylko (ECh Berlin 2018), Ferreira (SACh Guayaquil 2021), Ghazal (AsCh Doha 2019), Sawe (AfCh Asaba 2018), Kerr (OCh Townsville 2019), Starc (Commonwealth Games 2018), Zayas (Pan American Games 2019) and Harrison and Lovett, the US and Canadian Olympic Trials' winners.

The main non-qualifiers are all with marks below the entry standard of 2.33 m, but:

- Trey Culver (USA), qualified by Entry Standard, 2.33 m at Ocean Breeze Athl. Complex, New York (USA) – on 13 February 2021 but not in the first 3 at the US Olympic Trials.

There are 6 jumpers with more than 2.30 m in 2021, not qualified by ranking:

- Andrei Churyla (BLR) 2.31
- Erik Kynard and Jeron Robinson (USA) 2.30
- Ushan Thiwanka (SRI) 2.30
- Wang Zhen (CHN) 2.30
- Fabian Delryd (SWE) 2.30.

The Belgian Thomas Carmoy is the first non-qualifier as the next best by World Rankings (31st – 1214p).

From the 45 qualified jumpers of the last 2016 Summer Olympics, only 13 will also competed in Tokyo.

== Competition format ==
The 2020 competition continued to use the two-round format introduced in 1912. There were two distinct rounds of jumping with results cleared between rounds. Jumpers were eliminated if they had three consecutive failures, whether at a single height or between multiple heights if they attempted to advance before clearing a height.

The qualifying round had the bar set at various heights up to a qualifying standard of 2.30 metres. All jumpers clearing that standard advanced to the final. A minimum of 12 jumpers advanced; if fewer than 12 achieved the qualifying standard, the top 12 (including ties after use of the countback rules) would advance. It has been common in recent Games for few enough jumpers to achieve the last height below the qualifying standard that none even attempt the qualifying standard.

The final had jumps starting just below the qualifying standard and increasing gradually. The final continued until all jumpers were eliminated.

== Records ==
Prior to this competition, the global and area records were as follows.

World record	Javier Sotomayor (CUB)	2.45	Salamanca, Spain	27 July 1993
Olympic record	Charles Austin (USA)	2.39	Atlanta, United States	27 July 1996
World Leading	Maksim Nedasekau (BLR) (2); Ilya Ivanyuk (ANA)	2.37	Toruń, Poland (1) & Székesfehérvár, Hungary (2); Smolensk, Russia	7 March 2021 (1) & 6 July 2021 (2); 17 May 2021

Area	Height (m)	Athlete	Nation
Africa (records)	2.38	Jacques Freitag	South Africa
Asia (records)	2.43	Mutaz Essa Barshim	Qatar
Europe (records)	2.42	Patrik Sjöberg	Sweden
North, Central America and the Caribbean (records)	2.45 WR	Javier Sotomayor	Cuba
Oceania (records)	2.36	Tim Forsyth	Australia
South America (records)	2.33	Gilmar Mayo	Colombia

The following national records were established during the competition:

Country	Athlete	Round	Height	Notes
Belarus	Maksim Nedasekau	Final	2.37	
South Korea	Woo Sang-hyeok	Final	2.35	

== Schedule ==
All times are Japan Standard Time (UTC+9)

The men's high jump took place over two separate days.

Date	Time	Round
Friday, 30 July 2021	9:00	Qualifying
Sunday, 1 August 2021	19:00	Final

== Results ==
=== Qualifying round ===
Qualification rule: Qualifying performance 2.30 (Q) or at least 12 best performers (q) advance to the final.

Rank	Group	Athlete	Nation	2.17	2.21	2.25	2.28	Height	Notes
1	B	Mikhail Akimenko	ROC	o	o	o	o	2.28	q
1	A	Mutaz Essa Barshim	Qatar	–	o	o	o	2.28	q
1	A	Django Lovett	Canada	o	o	o	o	2.28	q
4	B	JuVaughn Harrison	United States	o	o	xo	o	2.28	q
4	A	Hamish Kerr	New Zealand	o	o	xo	o	2.28	q
4	B	Brandon Starc	Australia	o	o	xo	o	2.28	q
4	B	Naoto Tobe	Japan	o	xo	o	o	2.28	q
8	A	Shelby McEwen	United States	xo	xxo	o	o	2.28	q
9	A	Gianmarco Tamberi	Italy	o	o	o	xo	2.28	q
9	B	Woo Sang-hyeok	South Korea	o	o	o	xo	2.28	q
11	A	Ilya Ivanyuk	ROC	o	o	xo	xo	2.28	q
12	B	Maksim Nedasekau	Belarus	o	o	xxo	xo	2.28	q
13	A	Tom Gale	Great Britain	o	o	xo	xxo	2.28	q, SB
14	B	Michael Mason	Canada	o	o	o	xxx	2.25	
14	A	Dzmitry Nabokau	Belarus	o	o	o	xxx	2.25	
14	A	Andriy Protsenko	Ukraine	o	o	o	xxx	2.25	
17	A	Takashi Eto	Japan	o	o	xxx	—N/a	2.21	
17	A	Wang Yu	China	o	o	xxx	—N/a	2.21	
19	B	Majd Eddin Ghazal	Syria	xo	xo	xxx	—N/a	2.21	=SB
19	B	Edgar Rivera	Mexico	xo	xo	xxx	—N/a	2.21	
21	A	Fernando Ferreira	Brazil	o	xxo	xxx	—N/a	2.21	
21	B	Thiago Moura	Brazil	o	xxo	xxx	—N/a	2.21	
23	B	Loïc Gasch	Switzerland	xo	xxo	xxx	—N/a	2.21	
23	B	Mateusz Przybylko	Germany	xo	xxo	xxx	—N/a	2.21	
25	A	Donald Thomas	Bahamas	xxo	xxo	xxx	—N/a	2.21	
26	A	Adrijus Glebauskas	Lithuania	o	xxx	—N/a		2.17	
26	B	Tihomir Ivanov	Bulgaria	o	xxx	—N/a		2.17	
26	B	Stefano Sottile	Italy	o	xxr	—N/a		2.17	
26	A	Luis Zayas	Cuba	o	xxx	—N/a		2.17	
30	A	Mathew Sawe	Kenya	xo	xxx	—N/a		2.17	
30	B	Darryl Sullivan	United States	xo	xxx	—N/a		2.17	
32	B	Jamal Wilson	Bahamas	xxo	xxx	—N/a		2.17	
–	A	Lee Hup Wei	Malaysia	xxx	—N/a			NH	

=== Final ===
Rank	Athlete	Nation	2.19	2.24	2.27	2.30	2.33	2.35	2.37	2.39	Height	Notes
1st place, gold medalist(s)	Mutaz Essa Barshim	Qatar	–	o	o	o	o	o	o	xxx	2.37	SB
1st place, gold medalist(s)	Gianmarco Tamberi	Italy	o	o	o	o	o	o	o	xxx	2.37	SB
3rd place, bronze medalist(s)	Maksim Nedasekau	Belarus	xo	o	o	o	o	x-	o	xxx	2.37	=NR
4	Woo Sang-hyeok	South Korea	o	o	o	o	xo	o	x-	xx	2.35	NR
5	Brandon Starc	Australia	o	o	o	o	xxo	o	x-	xx	2.35	SB
6	Mikhail Akimenko	ROC	o	o	o	xo	xo	xx-	x		2.33	=SB
7	JuVaughn Harrison	United States	o	o	xxo	xo	xo	–	x-	xx	2.33	
8	Django Lovett	Canada	o	o	o	o	xxx				2.30	
9	Ilya Ivanyuk	ROC	o	o	o	xo	xxx				2.30	
10	Hamish Kerr	New Zealand	o	o	xxo	xxo	xxx				2.30	
11	Tom Gale	Great Britain	o	o	o	xxx					2.27	
12	Shelby McEwen	United States	o	xxo	o	xxx					2.27	
13	Naoto Tobe	Japan	xo	o	xxx						2.24	

o Valid trial | x Failed trial | - Passed trial | NR National Record | SB Season Best | =NR Equal National Record | =SB Equal Season Best
