= Brandon Starc =

Australian high jumper (born 1993)

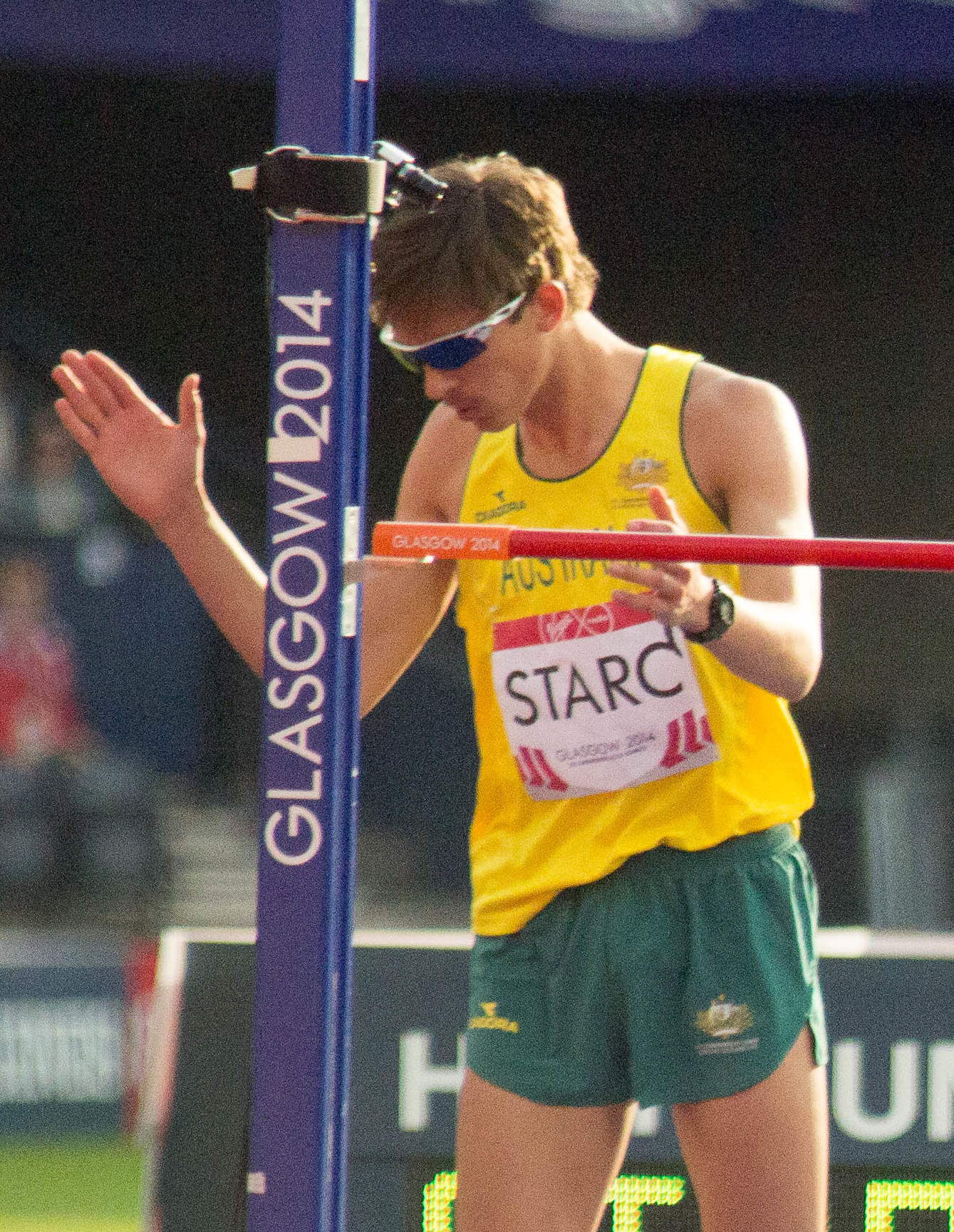
- Starc at the 2014 Commonwealth Games

Personal information
- Born: 24 November 1993 (age 32) Baulkham Hills, New South Wales, Australia
- Height: 1.88 m (6 ft 2 in)
- Weight: 71 kg (157 lb)
- Relatives: Mitchell Starc (brother); Alyssa Healy (sister-in-law)

Sport
- Sport: Athletics
- Event: High jump
- Coached by: Alex Stewart

Achievements and titles
- Personal bests: 2.36 m AR NR (2018)
Medal record
Men's athletics
Representing Australia
Diamond League
First place	2018 Brussels	High jump
Commonwealth Games
Gold medal – first place	2018 Gold Coast	High jump
Silver medal – second place	2022 Birmingham	High jump
Continental Cup
Silver medal – second place	2018 Ostrava	High jump
Youth Olympic Games
Silver medal – second place	2010 Singapore	High jump

Brandon Starc (born 24 November 1993) is an Australian high jumper. He holds the national and Oceania records, with a jump of 2.36 m achieved in 2018. A three-time Olympian, Starc has represented Australia at the 2016, 2020, and 2024 Olympic Games.

== Early life ==
Starc attended Lidcombe Public School and started his athletics career at Tiger Wests Little Athletics Centre in Auburn before moving to Parramatta in later years. He began to take his high jump achievements seriously and moved to Hills Sports High School. Starc also played cricket (like his elder brother Mitchell Starc) and football, but decided to concentrate on high jumping.

== Achievements ==
At the inaugural Youth Olympic Games in Singapore in 2010, Starc won silver with a personal best of 2.19 m.

Starc won his first National Senior Athletics Championships title in 2012 with 2.28 m, going on to qualify as a finalist at the 2012 World Junior Championships in Barcelona where he finished sixth, ahead of his senior debut in 2013 World Championships in Moscow. Starc has also competed in the finals at the 2014 Commonwealth Games.

Starc rose to prominence in the senior international track and field scene at 21 yrs of age, when he made to the high jump final at the 2015 World Championships in Beijing, finishing at twelfth position (the first Australian to contest a major men's high jump final since Tim Forsyth in 1997 at Athens). Moreover, Starc produced a personal best of 2.31 m at his first attempt at that height during the qualifying phase of the competition.

In the men's high jump event at the 2016 Rio Olympics, he achieved a season best of 2.29 m in the qualifying stage to make the final. He entered at 2.20 m in the final, clearing his second attempt, but did not progress from there.

Starc had a quiet 2017, not qualifying for the 2017 World Championships in Doha due to a shin injury. In 2018, he won his third Australian National title on 17 February with a leap of 2.28 m. He set a new personal best of 2.32 m in winning gold at the 2018 Commonwealth Games in Gold Coast, Queensland, on 11 April. He competed in a couple of events in Japan in May, before a spectacular three-month campaign in Europe. He equalled his personal best on 2 July finishing third at the Gyulai István Memorial in Székesfehérvár, Hungary. He achieved a new personal best of 2.33 m winning a Diamond League meeting in Birmingham on 18 August 2018.

He then set a third personal best for the year and equalled the Australian and Oceania records of 2.36 m (set by Tim Forsyth in 1997) in winning the prestigious annual Eberstadt Internationales Hochsprung meeting in Eberstadt on 26 August. That is the third highest leap so far in 2018. He then won the 2018 Diamond League Final in Brussels, on 31 August, clearing 2.33 m. Starc rounded off his 2018 European-summer campaign with a second place leap of 2.30 m at the Continental Cup in Ostrava on 8 September 2018.

Starc qualified for the 2020 Tokyo Olympics placing second in his group and qualifying for the finals. He placed fifth after jumping a height of 2.33 m, just 0.04 m short of the shared winners, Mutaz Essa Barshim and Gianmarco Tamberi.

== International competitions ==
Year	Competition	Venue	Position	Event	Notes
2012	World Junior Athletics Championships	Barcelona, Spain	6th	High jump	2.17
2013	World Championships	Moscow, Russia	25th	High jump	2.17
2014	Commonwealth Games	Glasgow, Scotland	8th	High jump	2.20 (Q); 2.21 (F)
2015	World Championships	Beijing, China	12th	High jump	2.31 (Q); 2.25 (F)
2016	Olympic Games	Rio de Janeiro, Brazil	15th	High jump	2.29 (Q); 2.20 (F)
2018	Commonwealth Games	Gold Coast, Australia	1st	High jump	2.21 (Q); 2.32 (F)
2018	Internationales Hochsprung	Eberstadt, Germany	1st	High jump	2.36
2018	IAAF Diamond League Final	Brussels, Belgium	1st	High jump	2.33
2021	Olympic Games	Tokyo, Japan	5th	High jump	2.35 (F)
2023	World Championships	Budapest, Hungary	8th	High jump	2.25 m
2024	Olympic Games	Paris, France	13th (q)	High jump	2.24 m
2025	World Championships	Tokyo, Japan	29th (q)	High jump	2.16 m

== Personal life ==
Starc is the younger brother of Australian cricketer Mitchell Starc and brother-in-law of Australian women's cricket captain Alyssa Healy. He is married to fellow athlete Laura Turner.
