= Athletics at the 2023 Pan American Games – Men's high jump =

Men's high jump at the 2023 Pan American Games
- Venue: Julio Martínez National Stadium
- Dates: November 3
- Competitors: 13 from 9 nations
- Winning height: 2.27

Medalists
Gold medal	Luis Zayas	Cuba
Silver medal	Luis Castro	Puerto Rico
Bronze medal	Donald Thomas	Bahamas

The men's high jump competition of the athletics events at the 2023 Pan American Games took place on November 3 at the Julio Martínez National Stadium of Santiago, Chile.

== Records ==
Prior to this competition, the existing world and Pan American Games records were as follows:

World record	Javier Sotomayor (CUB)	2.45	Salamanca, Spain	July 27, 1993
Pan American Games record	Javier Sotomayor (CUB)	2.40	Mar del Plata, Argentine	March 25, 1995

== Schedule ==
Date	Time	Round
November 3, 2023	17:31	Final

== Results ==
All times shown are in meters.

KEY:	q	Fastest non-qualifiers	Q	Qualified	NR	National record	PB	Personal best	SB	Seasonal best	DQ	Disqualified

=== Final ===
The results were as follows:

Rank	Name	Nationality	2.05	2.10	2.15	2.18	2.21	2.24	2.27	2.30	Mark	Notes
1st place, gold medalist(s)	Luis Zayas	Cuba	–	–	o	o	xo	o	xxo	r	2.27	
2nd place, silver medalist(s)	Luis Castro	Puerto Rico	–	o	o	–	o	o	xxx		2.24	
3rd place, bronze medalist(s)	Donald Thomas	Bahamas	o	–	xxo	–	xxo	xxo	xxx		2.24	
4	Edgar Rivera	Mexico	–	o	o	o	o	xxx			2.21	
5	Fernando Ferreira	Brazil	–	o	o	xo	o	xx-	xx		2.21	
6	Dontavius Hill	United States	xo	o	o	o	o	xxx			2.21	
7	Lushane Wilson	Jamaica	o	xo	o	xxo	xo	xxx			2.21	
8	Erick Portillo	Mexico	–	o	o	o	xxx				2.18	
9	Thiago Moura	Brazil	–	o	x--	xo	xxx				2.18	
10	Cristoff Bryan	Jamaica	–	o	o	–	xxx				2.15	
11	Elijah Kosiba	United States	–	xo	o	xxx					2.15	
12	Pedro Alamos	Chile	o	o	xo	xxx					2.15	
13	Carlos Layoy	Argentina	–	o	xxo	xxx					2.15	
