= Yuto Seko =

Japanese high jumper (born 1998)

Personal information
- Born: 16 March 1998 (age 28)

Sport
- Sport: Athletics
- Event: High jump

Achievements and titles
- Personal best: High jump: 2.33 m (2025)
Medal record
Men's athletics
Representing Japan
Asian Indoor Championships
Gold medal – first place	2026 Tianjin	High jump
Silver medal – second place	2024 Tehran	High jump

Yuto Seko (born 16 March 1998) is a Japanese high jumper. He was a silver medalist at the 2024 Asian Indoor Athletics Championships.

== Career ==
He was a silver medalist at the 2024 Asian Indoor Athletics Championships in Tehran, Iran, clearing 2.19 metres to finish runner-up on countback to compatriot Ryoichi Akamatsu. He finished in third place at the Golden Grand Prix in May 2024 with a jump of 2.20 metres.

He cleared 2.25 metres to set a new meeting record at the Hyogo Relay Carnival in Kobe in April 2025. In July 2025, he finished fifth at the Japanese Athletics Championships. The following month, he equalled the Japanese outdoor national record and improved his personal best with a jump of 2.33 metres whilst competing at the Athletes Night Games in Fukui, Japan.

In September, he qualified for the final and placed tenth overall at the 2025 World Athletics Championships in Tokyo, Japan.

In February 2026, he won the gold medal in the high jump at the 2026 Asian Indoor Athletics Championships in Tianjin, China.
