= Fernando Ferreira (high jumper) =

Brazilian high jumper (born 1994)

Personal information
- Full name: Fernando Carvalho Ferreira Santana
- Born: December 13, 1994 (age 31) Ribeirão Preto, Brazil
- Height: 1.98 m (6 ft 6 in)
- Weight: 57 kg (126 lb)

Sport
- Sport: Athletics
- Event: High jump

Fernando Carvalho Ferreira Santana (born 13 December 1994 in Ribeirão Preto) is a Brazilian athlete specialising in the high jump. He represented his country at the 2017 World Championships narrowly missing the final. He also won two medals at the South American Championships. He competed at the 2020 Summer Olympics.

His personal bests are 2.30 metres (7 ft 7 in) outdoors (São Bernardo do Campo 2017) and 2.26 metres (7 ft 5 in) indoors (Nehvizdy 2020).

== International competitions ==
Year	Competition	Venue	Position	Notes
Representing Brazil
2013	South American Junior Championships	Resistencia, Argentina	2nd	2.15 m (7 ft 1 in)
2014	South American U23 Championships	Montevideo, Uruguay	1st	2.24 m (7 ft 4 in)
2015	South American Championships	Lima, Peru	1st	2.22 m (7 ft 3 in)
2015	Pan American Games	Toronto, Canada	7th	2.20 m (7 ft 3 in)
2016	South American U23 Championships	Lima, Peru	1st	2.20 m (7 ft 3 in)
2017	South American Championships	Asunción, Paraguay	3rd	2.19 m (7 ft 2 in)
2017	World Championships	London, United Kingdom	17th (q)	2.29 m (7 ft 6 in)
2018	South American Games	Cochabamba, Bolivia	2nd	2.25 m (7 ft 5 in)
2018	Ibero-American Championships	Trujillo, Peru	3rd	2.10 m (6 ft 11 in)
2019	South American Championships	Lima, Peru	2nd	2.21 m (7 ft 3 in)
2019	Pan American Games	Lima, Peru	4th	2.26 m (7 ft 5 in)
2020	South American Indoor Championships	Cochabamba, Bolivia	1st	2.25 m (7 ft 5 in)
2021	South American Championships	Guayaquil, Ecuador	1st	2.29 m (7 ft 6 in)
2021	Olympic Games	Tokyo, Japan	21st (q)	2.21 m (7 ft 3 in)
2022	World Indoor Championships	Belgrade, Serbia	7th	2.24 m (7 ft 4 in)
2022	Ibero-American Championships	La Nucía, Spain	3rd	2.21 m (7 ft 3 in)
2023	South American Championships	São Paulo, Brazil	2nd	2.21 m (7 ft 3 in)
2023	World Championships	Budapest, Hungary	16th (q)	2.25 m (7 ft 5 in)
2023	Pan American Games	Santiago, Chile	5th	2.21 m (7 ft 3 in)
2024	South American Indoor Championships	Cochabamba, Bolivia	1st	2.21 m (7 ft 3 in)
2024	Ibero-American Championships	Cuiabá, Brazil	3rd	2.15 m (7 ft 1 in)
2024	Olympic Games	Paris, France	15th (q)	2.20 m (7 ft 3 in)
2025	South American Indoor Championships	Cochabamba, Bolivia	2nd	2.16 m (7 ft 1 in)
2025	South American Championships	Mar del Plata, Argentina	2nd	2.13 m (7 ft 0 in)
2026	South American Indoor Championships	Cochabamba, Bolivia	2nd	2.20 m (7 ft 3 in)
2026	Ibero-American Championships	Lima, Peru	4th	2.10 m (6 ft 11 in)
2026	South American Games	Santa Fe, Argentina	1st	2.14 m (7 ft 0 in)
