= Darryl Sullivan =

American high jumper (born 1997)

Darryl Sullivan OLY
Personal information
- Full name: Darryl Sullivan Jr.
- Born: December 28, 1997 (age 28) Marion, Illinois, U.S.

Sport
- Sport: Track and Field
- Event: High jump

Darryl Sullivan (born December 28, 1997) is an American Olympic track and field athlete who specialises in the high jump.

Sullivan, who is a native of Marion, Illinois, became a four-time All-American at the University of Tennessee. As a high school senior Sullivan won both the long jump and high jump competitions at the IHSA State Finals by completing jumps of 23' 1" and 7' 1.5" respectively. He still currently holds the class 2A State Finals Meet record in the high jump.

During the men's high jump at the U.S. Olympic Team Trials at Hayward Field, Sullivan equalled his personal best jump of 2.33 metres to finish second overall and win a spot on the American team for the delayed 2020 Summer Games. Both Sullivan and JuVaughn Harrison had jumped 2.33m but Harrison won the title on count back. Competing at the Athletics at the 2020 Summer Olympics – Men's high jump he jumped 2.17 metres which was not enough to qualify for the final.
