= Luis Castro (athlete) =

Puerto Rican high jumper (born 1991)

Luis Castro OLY
Personal information
- Full name: Luis Joel Castro Rivera
- Nationality: Puerto Rican
- Born: January 29, 1991 (age 35) Carolina, Puerto Rico
- Height: 6 ft 5 in (196 cm)
- Weight: 161 lb (73 kg)

Sport
- Country: Puerto Rico
- Sport: Athletics
- Event: High jump
- Coached by: Gaspar Epro, † Wolfgang Ritzdorf, Carlos Acosta

Achievements and titles
- Personal bests: High jump: 2.30 m NR; High jump (indoor): 2.26 m NR
Medal record
Men's athletics
Representing Puerto Rico
NACAC Championships
Bronze medal – third place	2025 Freeport	High Jump
Pan American Games
Silver medal – second place	2023 Santiago	High jump
Central American and Caribbean Games
Gold medal – first place	2023 El Salvador	High jump
Ibero-American Championships
Gold medal – first place	2014 São Paulo	High jump
NACAC U23 Championships
Silver medal – second place	2012 Irapuato	High jump

Luis Joel Castro Rivera (born January 29, 1991) is a Puerto Rican track and field athlete who specializes in high jump. A graduate of the University of Puerto Rico at Río Piedras, he made his debut at the 2011 Grand Prix Ximena Restrepo in Medellín, Colombia, where he placed 3rd. He also participated in the final of the 2016 Summer Olympics finishing 13th and in the final of the 2019 World Championships reaching the 12th place. He won the gold medal at the 2023 Central American and Caribbean Games with 2.25 m and a silver medal at the 2023 Pan American Games with 2.24 m.

On May 21, 2023, he jumped the current Puerto Rican national record with 2.30 m in Garbsen, Germany. He also holds the national indoor record with 2.26 m (January 29, 2019, in Cologne, Germany). On August 7, 2024, Castro Rivera competed in the Men's High Jump Qualification at the 2024 Summer Olympics in Paris, where he finished in 15th place.

== Competition record ==
Year	Competition	Venue	Position	Notes
Representing Puerto Rico
2011	Central American and Caribbean Championships	Mayagüez, Puerto Rico	9th	2.10 m
2012	Ibero-American Championships	Barquisimeto, Venezuela	4th	2.22 m
2012	NACAC U23 Championships	Irapuato, Mexico	2nd	2.21 m
2013	Universiade	Kazan, Russia	11th	2.15 m
2014	Ibero-American Championships	São Paulo, Brazil	2nd	2.26 m
2014	Central American and Caribbean Games	Veracruz, Mexico	10th	2.05 m
2016	Olympic Games	Rio de Janeiro, Brazil	13th	2.25 m
2018	Central American and Caribbean Games	Barranquilla, Colombia	4th	2.28 m
2018	NACAC Championships	Toronto, Canada	9th	2.16 m
2019	Pan American Games	Lima, Peru	8th	2.18 m
2019	World Championships	Doha, Qatar	12th	2.19 m
2022	Ibero-American Championships	La Nucía, Spain	7th	2.15 m
2022	NACAC Championships	Freeport, Bahamas	8th	2.16 m
2023	Central American and Caribbean Games	San Salvador, El Salvador	1st	2.25 m
2023	World Championships	Budapest, Hungary	25th (q)	2.22 m
2023	Pan American Games	Santiago, Chile	2nd	2.24 m
2024	Olympic Games	Paris, France	15th (q)	2.20 m
2025	World Indoor Championships	Nanjing, China	9th	2.14 m
2025	NACAC Championships	Freeport, Bahamas	3rd	2.21 m
2025	World Championships	Tokyo, Japan	–	NM
2026	Ibero-American Championships	Lima, Peru	7th	2.05 m
2026	Pan American Championships	Medellín, Colombia	4th	2.09 m
2026	Central American and Caribbean Games	Santo Domingo, Dominican Republic	9th	2.05 m
