= Vernon Turner (high jumper) =

American high jumper (born 1998)

Personal information
- Nationality: American
- Born: August 21, 1998 (age 27)

Sport
- Country: United States
- Sport: Track and field
- Event: High jump

Achievements and titles
- Personal bests: 2.33 (Fayetteville, 2018)

Vernon Turner (born August 21, 1998) is an American track and field athlete who competes as a high jumper. He won the 2025 USA Indoor Track and Field Championships.

== Early life ==
The son of Melonie Turner, Turner attended Yukon High School in Oklahoma. He was the youngest man to qualify for the 2024 US Olympic trials in the high jump.

== NCAA ==
He spent his first year at University of Oklahoma. Turner attended the University of Arkansas before later transferring back to Oklahoma. Competing for the University of Oklahoma, Turner won the NCAA Indoor Championships in the high jump in 2022.

== Professional ==
In July 2023, he finished third in the US national championships. He was selected for the 2023 World Athletics Championships in Budapest.

In February 2024, he was runner-up to Shelby McEwen at the US national indoor championships in New Mexico. In March 2024, he competed at the 2024 World Athletics Indoor Championships in Glasgow.

He finished third at the 2024 Diamond League Shanghai with a 2.27m clearance. He competed at the 2024 Summer Olympics in Paris.

the 2025 USA Indoor Track and Field Championships in New York, on February 23, 2025. He cleared 2.20 metres to finish joint-fourth in May 2025 at the 2025 Doha Diamond League.
