= Jan Štefela =

Czech high jumper

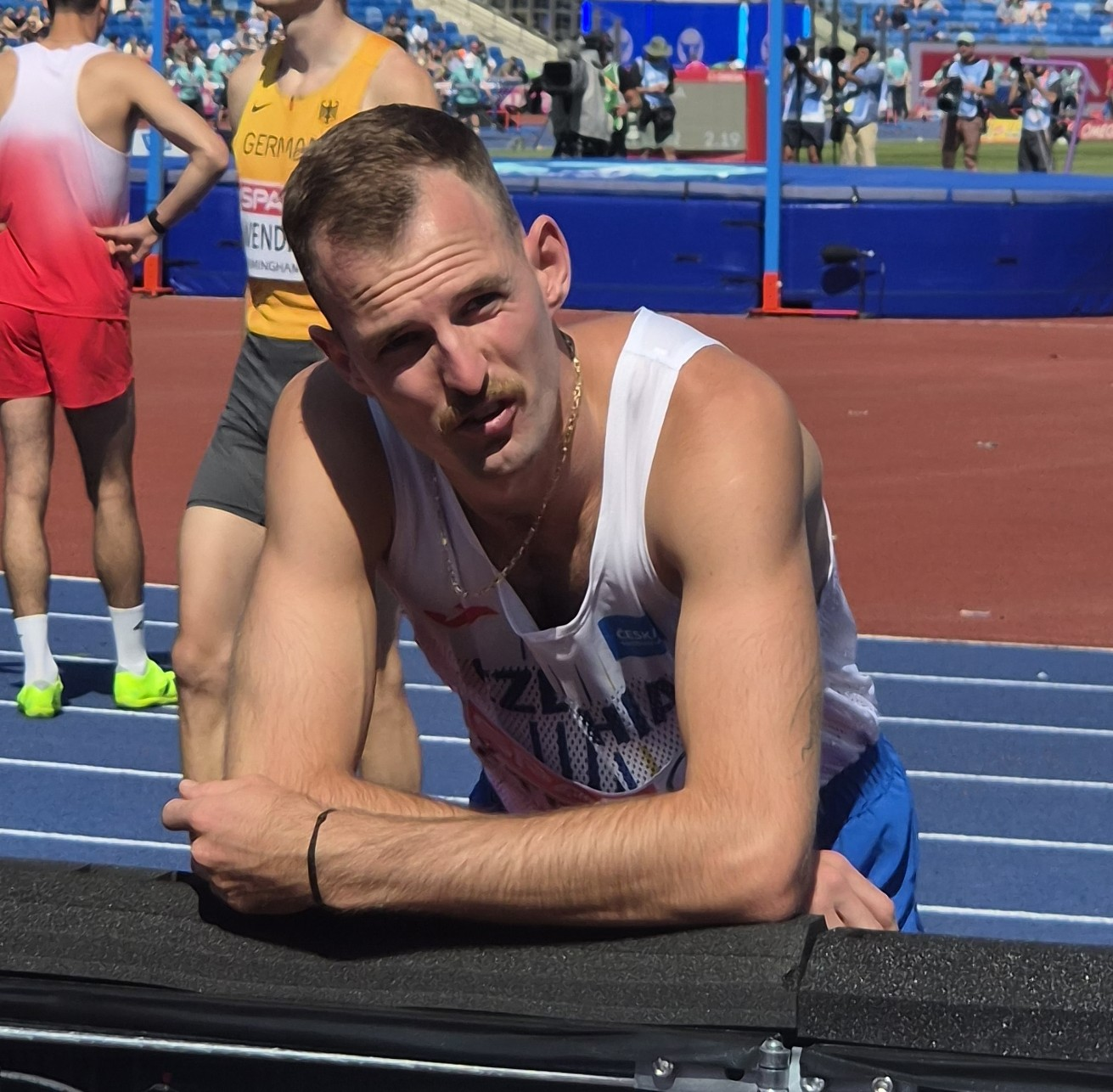
- 2026 European Championships

Personal information
- Born: 20 April 2001 (age 25) Krnov, Czech Republic

Sport
- Sport: Athletics
- Event: High jump

Achievements and titles
- Personal bests: 2.30 m i 2024; 2.33 m (outdoors) 2025
Medal record
Men's athletics
Representing Czech Republic
World Championships
Bronze medal – third place	2025 Tokyo	High jump
European Indoor Championships
Silver medal – second place	2025 Apeldoorn	High jump
European Athletics U23 Championships
Gold medal – first place	2021 Tallinn	High jump

Jan Štefela (Czech pronunciation: [ˈjan ˈʃtɛfɛla]; born 20 April 2001) is a Czech high jumper. He won the gold medal in the high jump event at the 2021 European Under-23 Championships, the bronze medal at the 2025 World Athletics Championships, and placed fifth at the 2024 World Indoor Championships. He is also a three-time national champion, winning the outdoor title in 2022, and 2023, and the indoor title in 2023.

His personal best is 2.30 metres indoors, set in Třinec in February 2024 and 2.33 metres outdoors, set in June 2025 in Madrid, Spain.

== Life ==
Štefela was born on 20 April 2001 in the hospital in Krnov, however, he is native of the nearby municipality of Zátor.

== International competitions ==
Year	Competition	Venue	Position	Notes
Representing the Czech Republic
2021	European U23 Championships	Tallinn, Estonia	1st	2.20 m
2022	European Championships	Munich, Germany	7th	2.18 m
2023	European U23 Championships	Espoo, Finland	5th	2.15 m
2024	World Indoor Championships	Glasgow, United Kingdom	5th	2.24 m
2024	European Championships	Rome, Italy	5th	2.26 m
2024	Olympic Games	Paris, France	9th	2.22 m
2025	European Indoor Championships	Apeldoorn, Netherlands	2nd	2.29 m
2025	World Indoor Championships	Nanjing, China	9th	2.14 m
2025	World Championships	Tokyo, Japan	3rd	2.31 m
2026	World Indoor Championships	Toruń, Poland	6th	2.26 m
2026	European Championships	Birmingham, United Kingdom	13th (q)	2.19 m
2026	World Ultimate Championship	Budapest, Hungary	7th	2.17 m
