= Raymond Richards (high jumper) =

Jamaican athlete (born 2001)

Personal information
- Full name: Raymond Anthony Richards
- Nationality: Jamaican
- Born: 18 April 2001 (age 25)

Sport
- Sport: Athletics
- Event: High jump

Achievements and titles
- Personal bests: High Jump 2.30m (Spanish Town, 2025)
Medal record
Men's athletics
Representing Jamaica
World Indoor Championships
Bronze medal – third place	2025 Nanjing	High jump
Bronze medal – third place	2026 Toruń	High jump
NACAC U23 Championships
Bronze medal – third place	2021 San Jose	High jump

Raymond Anthony Richards (born 18 April 2001) is a Jamaican high jumper. He is a two-time medalist at the World Athletics Indoor Championships. He became Jamaican national champion in the high jump for the first time in 2021.

== Biography ==
He won the Jamaican Athletics Championships in the high jump in June 2021. In July 2021, he won bronze at the NACAC U23 championships in Costa Rica.

A member of the MVP Track and Field Club, he set a personal best height of 2.25 metres in February 2024. In May 2024, he cleared 2.24 metres to win the Jamaica Athletics Invitational meeting.

In January 2025, he cleared a personal best height of 2.31 metres, the second highest ever made by a Jamaican athlete. However, the height is not recognised by World Athletics because the event he competed at was not on the official list of ratified events submitted ahead of the season by the JAAA. On 16 February 2025, he cleared 2.23 metres at the Tyson Invitational in Arkansas. On 1 March 2025, he cleared 2.30 metres competing in Spanish Town, Jamaica.

He was named in the Jamaican team for the 2025 World Athletics Indoor Championships in Nanjing in March 2025, where he won the bronze medal in the high jump after clearing 2.28 metres. He jumped 2.26 metres to finish third on countback at Mutaz Barshim's What Gravity Challenge in Doha on 10 May 2025, with the same height as Japan's Ryoichi Akamatsu, who claimed second. He cleared 2.15 meters to finish sixth on 16 May at the 2025 Doha Diamond League. He placed second on countback in the high jump in June 2025 at the Jamaican Athletics Championships, having cleared the equal best height of 2.25 metres with Romaine Beckford. He competed at the 2025 World Athletics Championships in Tokyo, Japan.

Richards won the bronze medal at the 2026 World Athletics Indoor Championships in Poland on 21 March 2026, finishing behind Oleh Doroshchuk of Ukraine and Erick Portillo of Mexico. On 19 June, he placed fourth at the 2026 Doha Diamond League. He placed fourth in the high jump at the 2026 Commonwealth Games in Glasgow, Scotland.
