= Edgar Rivera =

Mexican high jumper

Personal information
- Full name: Edgar Alejandro Rivera Morales
- Born: 13 February 1991 (age 35) Agua Prieta, Sonora, Mexico
- Height: 1.98 m (6 ft 6 in)
- Weight: 85 kg (187 lb)

Sport
- Country: Mexico
- Sport: Athletics
- Event: High jump
- Updated on 7 February 2017

Edgar Alejandro Rivera Morales (born 13 February 1991) is a Mexican athlete who specialize in the high jump. He represented his country at the Rio 2016 Olympic Games, the 2011 and 2013 World Championships without qualifying to the final. He finished fourth at the 2017 World Championships. He also competed in the World University Games Shenzhen 2011 and Kazan 2013, among other important meets representing his country (CAC Games 2014, PanAm Games 2011 and 2015, World Youth (2007) and World Junior (2008 and 2010) Championships.

He studied at the University of Arizona. His older brother, Luis Rivera, is a world-class long jumper.

== Personal bests ==
He has personal bests of 2.31 metres outdoors (2021) and 2.30 metres indoors (2016). Both are the current national records.

Event	Result	Venue	Date
Outdoor
High jump	2.31 m	Šamorín, Slovakia	2 June 2021
Indoor
High jump	2.30 m	Brno, Czech Republic	9 February 2016

== Competition record ==
Year	Competition	Venue	Position	Notes
Representing Mexico
2005	International Children's Games (U16)	Coventry, United Kingdom	1st	1.92 m
2006	Central American and Caribbean; Junior Championships (U17)	Port of Spain, Trinidad and Tobago	2nd	1.99 m
2006	International Children's Games (U16)	Bangkok, Thailand	1st	2.06 m
2007	World Youth Championships	Ostrava, Czech Republic	5th	2.14 m
2008	World Junior Championships	Bydgoszcz, Poland	10th	2.08 m
2009	Pan American Junior Championships	Port of Spain, Trinidad and Tobago	2nd	2.10 m
2010	World Junior Championships	Moncton, Canada	6th	2.17 m
2011	Universiade	Shenzhen, China	14th (q)	2.15 m
2011	World Championships	Daegu, South Korea	26th (q)	2.21 m
2011	Pan American Games	Guadalajara, Mexico	8th	2.18 m
2012	NACAC U23 Championships	Irapuato, Mexico	1st	2.23 m
2013	Universiade	Kazan, Russia	10th	2.15 m
2013	World Championships	Moscow, Russia	22nd (q)	2.22 m
2014	Ibero-American Championships	São Paulo, Brazil	1st	2.28 m
2014	Pan American Sports Festival	Mexico City, Mexico	3rd	2.23m A
2014	Central American and Caribbean Games	Xalapa, Mexico	4th	2.21 m A
2015	Pan American Games	Toronto, Canada	7th	2.20 m
2016	Olympic Games	Rio de Janeiro, Brazil	35th (q)	2.17 m
2017	World Championships	London, United Kingdom	4th	2.29 m
2018	Central American and Caribbean Games	Barranquilla, Colombia	8th	2.16 m
2018	NACAC Championships	Toronto, Canada	6th	2.22 m
2019	Pan American Games	Lima, Peru	9th	2.15 m
2021	Olympic Games	Tokyo, Japan	19th (q)	2.21 m
2022	World Indoor Championships	Belgrade, Serbia	7th	2.24 m
2022	Ibero-American Championships	La Nucía, Spain	1st	2.26 m
2022	World Championships	Eugene, United States	13th	2.19 m
2023	Central American and Caribbean Games	San Salvador, El Salvador	4th	2.22 m
2023	World Championships	Budapest, Hungary	14th (q)	2.25 m
2023	Pan American Games	Santiago, Chile	4th	2.21 m
2024	World Indoor Championships	Glasgow, United Kingdom	8th	2.20 m
2024	Ibero-American Championships	Cuiabá, Brazil	1st	2.20 m
2024	Olympic Games	Paris, France	15th (q)	2.20 m
2025	World Championships	Tokyo, Japan	14th (q)	2.21 m
