= Naoto Hasegawa =

Japanese high jumper (born 1996)

Personal information
- Born: 15 November 1996 (age 29)

Sport
- Sport: Athletics
- Event: High jump

Achievements and titles
- Personal bests: High jump: 2.30 m (Hustopeče, 2026)

Naoto Hasegawa (born 15 November 1996) is a Japanese high jumper. He competed for Japan at the 2023 World Athletics Championships and the 2025 World Athletics Indoor Championships.

== Biography ==
In 2018, Hasegawa won the Japanese Intercollegiate Championships with a jump of 2.18 meters. In 2019, his first year with Niigata Albirex RC, he broke the Niigata prefecture record by 1 centimetre with a jump of 2.25 meters, breaking a record that had stood for 28 years. He finished in a tie for second place at the Japanese Athletics Championships in October 2020.

Hasegawa was selected to represent Japan and cleared 2.23 metres to place fourth at the 2023 Asian Athletics Championships in Bangkok in July 2023. He subsequently represented Japan at the 2023 World Athletics Championships in Budapest, Hungary in August 2023, but did not progress from the qualifying heats.

Hasegawa competed for Japan at the 2025 World Athletics Indoor Championships in Nanjing, China in March 2025, placing seventh overall with a successful clearance of 2.20 metres.

Hasegawa cleared 2.23 metres to place fourth at the 2025 Asian Athletics Championships in Gumi, South Korea in May 2025. In July 2025, he set a new personal best of 2.27 metres whilst competing in Nagaoka, Japan. That month, he finished third at the Japanese Athletics Championships. The following month, he equalled his personal best to win the high jump competition at the Istvan Gyulai Memorial, on a World Athletics Continental Tour Gold meeting, in Budapest, Hungary.

Hasegawa set a new personal best of 2.30 metres in Hustopeče in February 2026. In March 2026, he was selected for the 2026 World Athletics Indoor Championships in Poland, placing eleventh overall.

== Personal life ==
He attended Shibata Chuo High School in Niigata before later attending Niigata University of Health and Welfare.
