= Woo Sang-hyeok =

South Korean high jumper (born 1996)

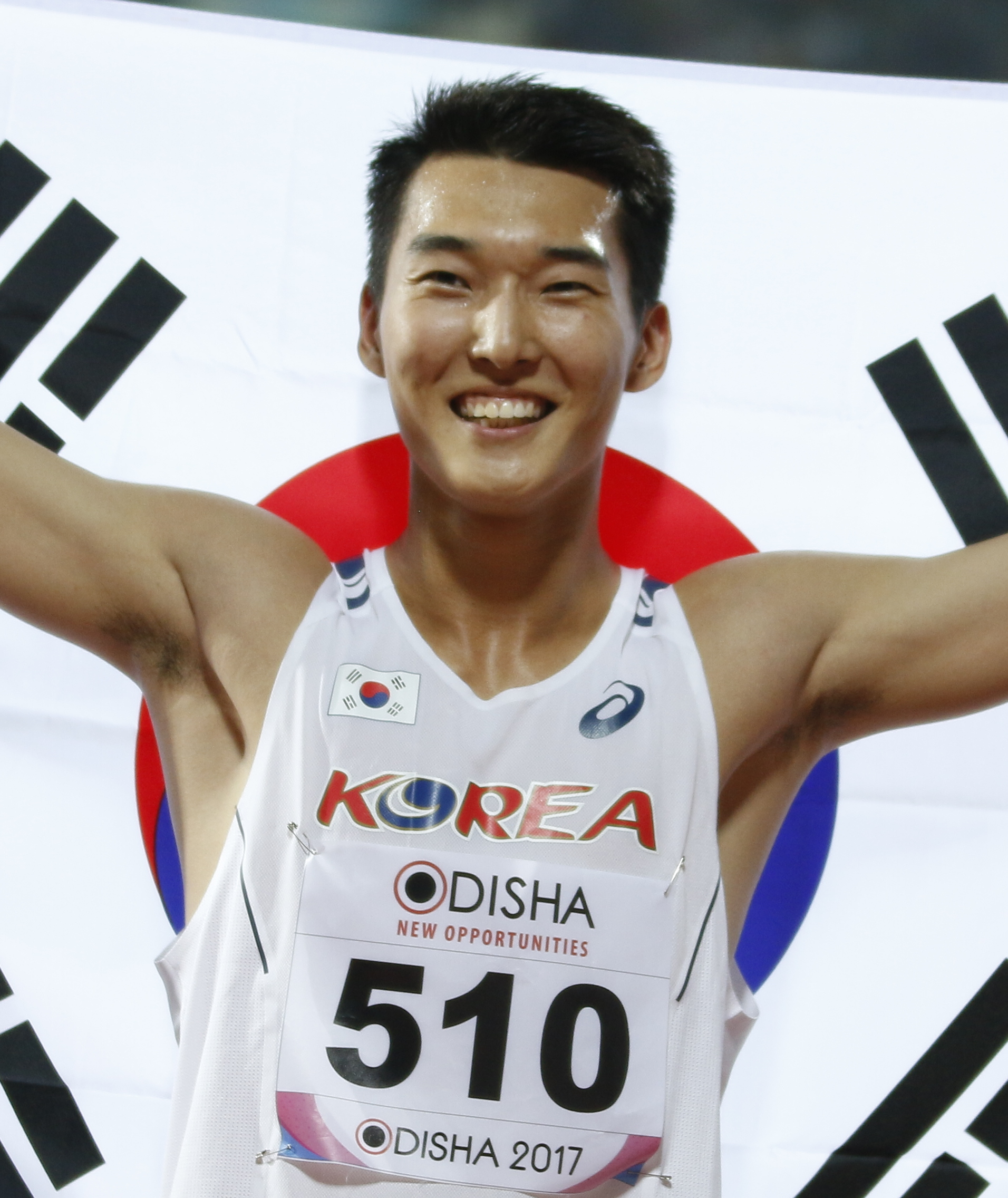
- Woo at the 2017 Asian Championships

Personal information
- Born: 23 April 1996 (age 30) Daejeon, South Korea
- Education: Digital Seoul Culture Arts University
- Height: 1.88 m (6 ft 2 in)
- Weight: 76 kg (168 lb)

Sport
- Sport: Track and field
- Event: High jump

Achievements and titles
- Personal bests: 2.35 m (2021) NR; 2.36 m (i) NR (2022)
Medal record
Men's athletics
Representing South Korea
World Championships
Silver medal – second place	2022 Eugene	High jump
Silver medal – second place	2025 Tokyo	High jump
World Indoor Championships
Gold medal – first place	2022 Belgrade	High jump
Gold medal – first place	2025 Nanjing	High jump
Bronze medal – third place	2024 Glasgow	High jump
Bronze medal – third place	2026 Toruń	High jump
Diamond League
Gold medal – first place	2023	High jump
Asian Games
Silver medal – second place	2018 Jakarta	High jump
Silver medal – second place	2022 Hangzhou	High jump
Bronze medal – third place	2026 Aichi–Nagoya	High jump
Asian Championships
Gold medal – first place	2017 Bhubaneswar	High jump
Gold medal – first place	2023 Bangkok	High jump
Gold medal – first place	2025 Gumi	High jump
Asian Indoor Championships
Silver medal – second place	2023 Astana	High jump
World Junior Championships
Bronze medal – third place	2014 Eugene	High jump
World Youth Championships
Gold medal – first place	2013 Donetsk	High jump

Woo Sang-hyeok (Korean: 우상혁; pronounced [u sɐŋçʌk̚]; born 23 April 1996) is a South Korean high jumper. He is a two-time silver medalist at the World Championships, two-time gold medalist at the World Indoor Championships and three-time gold medalist at the Asian Championships. Woo has also represented South Korea at the 2016 and 2020 Olympics, placing fourth in Tokyo.

== International competitions ==
Representing South Korea
Year	Competition	Venue	Position	Notes
2013	World Youth Championships	Donetsk, Ukraine	1st	2.20 m
2014	World Junior Championships	Eugene, United States	3rd	2.24 m
2014	Asian Games	Incheon, South Korea	10th	2.20 m
2015	Asian Championships	Wuhan, China	10th	2.10 m
2015	Universiade	Gwangju, South Korea	5th	2.24 m
2016	Asian Indoor Championships	Doha, Qatar	12th	2.10 m i
2016	Olympic Games	Rio de Janeiro, Brazil	22nd (q)	2.26 m
2017	Asian Championships	Bhubaneswar, India	1st	2.30 m
2017	World Championships	London, United Kingdom	25th (q)	2.22 m
2017	Universiade	Taipei, Taiwan	8th	2.20 m
2018	Asian Games	Jakarta, Indonesia	2nd	2.28 m
2019	Asian Championships	Doha, Qatar	7th	2.19 m
2021	Olympic Games	Tokyo, Japan	4th	2.35 m
2022	World Indoor Championships	Belgrade, Serbia	1st	2.34 m i
2022	World Championships	Eugene, Oregon	2nd	2.35 m
2023	Asian Indoor Championships	Astana, Kazakhstan	2nd	2.24 m
2023	Asian Championships	Bangkok, Thailand	1st	2.28 m
2023	World Championships	Budapest, Hungary	6th	2.29 m
2023	Asian Games	Hangzhou, China	2nd	2.33 m
2024	World Indoor Championships	Glasgow, United Kingdom	3rd	2.28 m
2024	Olympic Games	Paris, France	7th	2.27 m
2025	World Indoor Championships	Nanjing, China	1st	2.31 m
2025	Asian Championships	Gumi, South Korea	1st	2.29 m
2025	World Championships	Tokyo, Japan	2nd	2.34 m
2026	World Indoor Championships	Toruń, Poland	3rd	2.26 m
