= Romaine Beckford =

Jamaican athlete (born 2002)

Personal information
- Nationality: Jamaican
- Born: 9 July 2002 (age 24) Buff Bay, Jamaica

Sport
- Sport: Athletics
- Event: High jump

Achievements and titles
- Personal best: High Jump 2.30m (Chorzów 2024)
Medal record
Men's athletics
Representing Jamaica
Commonwealth Games
Gold medal – first place	2026 Glasgow	High jump
NACAC U23 Championships
Gold medal – first place	2023 San Jose	High jump

Romaine Beckford (born 9 July 2002) is a Jamaican track and field athlete who competes in the high jump. He won the gold medal at the 2026 Commonwealth Games.

== Biography ==
From Portland, Jamaica, Beckford attended South Plains College for two years before transferring to the University of South Florida. He cleared 2.14m at the CARIFTA Games held in the Caymans.

CAREER

== 2022 ==
He set a personal best of 2.21m at the Tom Jones Memorial meet at the University of Florida in April 2022. Later that month, whilst competing at the Penn Relays in Philadelphia in the high jump, he set a new personal best clearance of 2.23 metres. He finished eighth at the 2022 Commonwealth Games in Birmingham in July 2022.

== 2023 ==
He won the 2023 NCAA Indoor Championships high jump title competing for USF. In June 2023, he won the NCAA Outdoor title with a personal best height of 2.27m, in Austin, Texas. In July 2023, he won the Jamaican national title in Kingston, Jamaica. He subsequently competed for Jamaica at the 2023 World Athletics Championships in Budapest. He won the 2023 NACAC U23 Championships in San José, Costa Rica.

== 2024 ==
He transferred to the University of Arkansas for the 2023–24 season. In February 2024, he set an indoor personal best of 2.27 metres at the Razorback Invitational. He won the high jump at the 2024 NCAA Indoor Championships in March 2024 in Boston, Massachusetts, doing so with a personal best indoors height of 2.27m. He won the 2024 NCAA Division I Outdoor title in June 2024, with a clearance of 2.26m in Eugene, Oregon.

In July 2024, he was officially selected for the Jamaican team for the 2024 Summer Olympics, where he qualified for the final, finishing in tenth place overall.

== 2025 ==
He cleared 2.20 metres to finish fourth in May 2025 at the 2025 Doha Diamond League. The following week he finished in fifth place at the 2025 Meeting International Mohammed VI d'Athlétisme de Rabat, also part of the 2025 Diamond League, in May 2025. He finished third with a jump of 2.26 metres at the Diamond League event at the 2025 Golden Gala in Rome on 6 June 2025. He won the high jump at the 2025 Jamaican Athletics Championships with a height of 2.25 metres on countback from Raymond Richards. He was third at the 2025 Memorial Van Damme in the Diamond League, in Brussels, Belgium, on 22 August. He placed fourth at the Diamond League Final in Zurich on 28 August. He was a finalist at the 2025 World Athletics Championships in Tokyo, Japan.

== 2026 ==
In March 2026, he was selected for the 2026 World Athletics Indoor Championships in Poland, placing ninth overall. On 4 June, he placed third at the 2026 Golden Gala in Rome, part of the 2026 Diamond League. That month, he won the Jamaican Championships after completing a first-time clearance of 2.25m. On 27 July, he won the gold medal at the 2026 Commonwealth Games in Glasgow, Scotland, with a best jump of 2.25 metres. In August, he cleared 2.29m to place second in the Diamond League at the 2026 Kamila Skolimowska Memorial in Silesia, Poland. At the 2026 Diamond League Final in Brussels in September, he placed fifth with 2.21 metres.
