= Hamish Kerr =

New Zealand high jumper (born 1996)

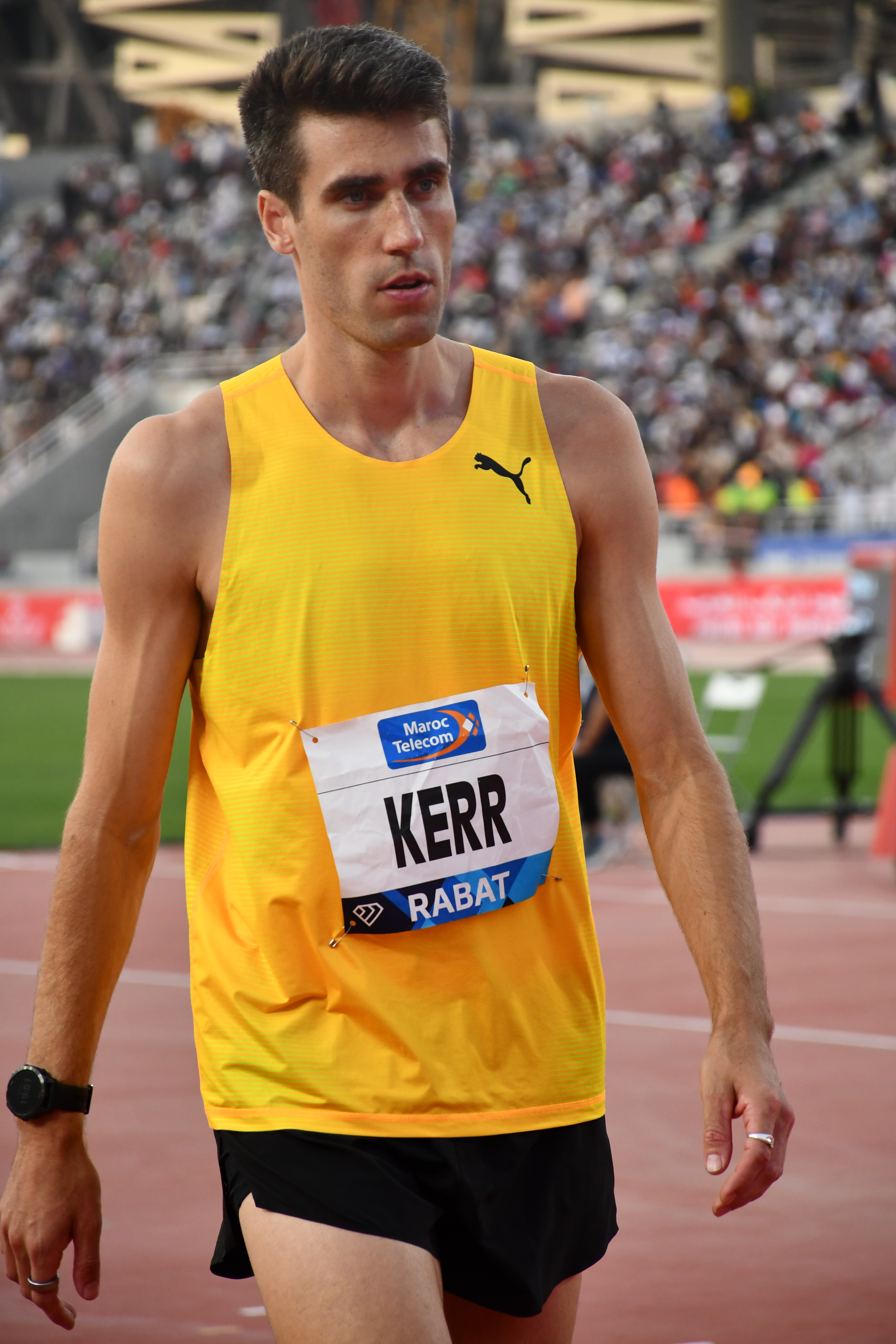
- Kerr at the 2025 Meeting International Mohammed VI d'Athlétisme de Rabat.

Personal information
- Born: 17 August 1996 (age 30) Dunedin, New Zealand
- Height: 1.98 m (6 ft 6 in)

Sport
- Sport: Athletics
- Event: High jump

Achievements and titles
- Olympic finals: 1st (2024)
- World finals: 1st (2025)
- National finals: 1st (2015, 2017–2023, 2025, 2026)
- Personal bests: 2.36 m AR (2024)
Medal record
Men's athletics
Representing New Zealand
Olympic Games
Gold medal – first place	2024 Paris	High jump
World Championships
Gold medal – first place	2025 Tokyo	High jump
World Indoor Championships
Gold medal – first place	2024 Glasgow	High jump
Silver medal – second place	2025 Nanjing	High jump
Bronze medal – third place	2022 Belgrade	High jump
Diamond League
First place	2025	High jump
Commonwealth Games
Gold medal – first place	2022 Birmingham	High jump

Hamish Kerr (born 17 August 1996) is a New Zealand high jumper. He won the gold medal in the men's high jump at the 2024 Paris Olympics and the 2025 World Championships. At the World Indoor Championships he won gold in 2024 having previously won bronze in 2022. He also won gold at the 2022 Commonwealth Games. Kerr is the co-holder of the Oceanian record and sole holder of the Oceanian indoor record.

== Career ==
In June 2019, Kerr equalled the national record with a jump of 2.30 m, winning the gold medal at the Oceania Athletics Championships in Townsville. He went on to compete at the Universiade in Naples, Italy, in July and then the World Athletics Championships in October in Doha, Qatar.

In February 2021, he improved the national record with 2.31 m at the Newtown Park Stadium, Wellington. Later the same year at the postponed 2020 Tokyo Olympics, he finished 10th in the men's high jump final with a clearance of 2.30 m.

Kerr competed at the 2022 World Indoor Championships in Belgrade, Serbia, in March, where he surpassed the 39-year-old New Zealand indoor record of Roger Te Puni (of 2.16 m) with a bronze medal-winning jump of 2.31 m (tied with Gianmarco Tamberi). He won the Oceania Athletics Championships in June that year, jumping 2.24 m. In August, he claimed the gold medal at the Commonwealth Games held in Birmingham with a jump of 2.25 m.

In February 2023 at the Banskobystricka latka in Banská Bystrica, Slovakia, Kerr broke Tim Forsyth's Oceanian indoor record dating back to 1997 with a clearance of 2.34 m.

On 10 August 2024, Kerr won the gold medal in the final of men's high jump at the 2024 Summer Olympics in Paris, having cleared 2.34 m in a jump-off against Shelby McEwen – the two both had previously cleared 2.36 m in regulation.

On 17 September 2025, Kerr won the high jump at the 2025 World Athletics Championships in Tokyo, equalling his personal best and national record 2.36 m.

In December 2025, Kerr was awarded the Lonsdale Cup by the New Zealand Olympic Committee.

Awards
Preceded by Aaron Gate	New Zealand's Sportsman of the Year; 2024, 2025	Incumbent
Preceded by Lydia Ko	Halberg Awards – Supreme Award; 2025	Incumbent
Preceded by Lydia Ko	Lonsdale Cup; 2025	Incumbent
