= Luis Zayas (athlete) =

Cuban high jumper

Personal information
- Full name: Luis Enrique Zayas Fernández
- Nationality: Cuban
- Born: June 7, 1997 (age 29) Santiago de Cuba, Cuba

Sport
- Country: Cuba
- Sport: Athletics
- Event: High jump
Medal record
Men's athletics
Representing Cuba
Pan American Games
| Gold medal – first place | 2019 Lima | High jump |
| Gold medal – first place | 2023 Santiago | High jump |

Luis Enrique Zayas Fernández (born 7 June 1997 in Santiago de Cuba) is a Cuban high jumper.

In July 2016, he realized his personal best of 2.27 m, a World Junior Lead performance, to win the title at 2016 World Junior Championships in Bydgoszcz. He won the Panamerican Games title with a new personal best of 2.30 m in 2019. He competed at the 2020 and 2024 Summer Olympics.

His mother Tania Fernández is a former hurdler.
