= JuVaughn Harrison =

American high jumper and long jumper (born 1999)

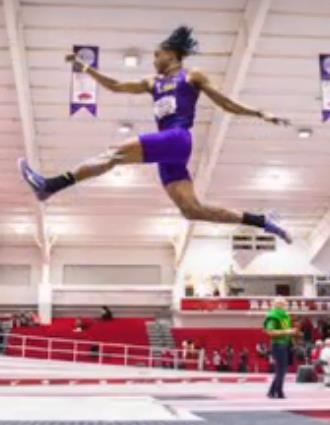
- JuVaughn Harrison at the 2020 NCAA Indoor T&F Championships.

Personal information
- Full name: JuVaughn Krishna Harrison
- Nickname: Mr. Jumps
- National team: United States
- Born: April 30, 1999 (age 27) Huntsville, Alabama, United States
- Height: 6 ft 4 in (193 cm)

Sport
- Sport: Athletics/Track and field
- Events: High jump Long jump
- Club: LSU Tigers

Achievements and titles
- Olympic finals: 2020 Tokyo; High jump, 7th; Long jump, 5th
- World finals: 2023 Budapest; High jump - Silver
- Highest world ranking: 1st (High jump, 2023)
- Personal bests: Outdoor; High jump: 2.36 m (7 ft 8 3/4 in) (College Station 2021 and Budapest 2023); Long jump: 8.47 m (27 ft 9 1/4 in) (Eugene 2021); Indoor; High jump: 2.30 m (7 ft 6 1/2 in) i (Fayetteville 2021); Long jump: 8.45 m (27 ft 8 1/2 in) i (Fayetteville 2021)
Medal record
Men's athletics
Representing the United States
World Championships
Silver medal – second place	2023 Budapest	High jump
World U20 Championships
Bronze medal – third place	2018 Tampere	High jump

JuVaughn Krishna Harrison (né Blake; born April 30, 1999) is an American high jumper and long jumper. He won the silver medal in the high jump at the 2023 World Athletics Championships.

== Career ==
=== Youth ===
Harrison attended Columbia high school in Huntsville, Alabama. He recorded bests of 7 feet 2 inches in the high jump and 23 feet 0.5 inches in the long jump.

=== Collegiate ===
On March 12, 2021, in Fayetteville, Arkansas on the occasion of the 2021 NCAA Division I Indoor Track and Field Championships, Harrison set personal records in the high jump with 2.30 m and in the long jump with 8.45 m, thus becoming the first man in history capable of jumping at least 8.40 m in the long jump and 2.30 m in the high jump.

On June 27, 2021, Harrison won both the long jump and the high jump at the US National Team Olympic Trials in Eugene, Oregon. At the 2020 Summer Olympics, he became the first American man since Jim Thorpe in 1912 to compete in both the long jump and high jump at the Olympics.

=== Professional ===
After the 2020 Olympic Trials, Harrison signed with Puma to compete professionally. Harrison finished 5th in the long jump and 7th in the high jump at the 2020 Summer Olympics. In 2023 Harrison won the silver medal at the World Athletics Championships in Budapest, finishing second to reigning Olympic champion Gianmarco Tamberi of Italy on a countback despite clearing the same 2.36 metres height.

== Achievements ==
Year	Competition	Venue	Rank	Event	Measure	Notes
2018	World Junior Championships	(Finland) Tampere	3rd	High jump	2.23 m	PB
2018	World Junior Championships	(Finland) Tampere	9th	Long jump	7.63 m	
2021	Olympic Games	(Japan) Tokyo	7th	High jump	2.33 m	
2021	Olympic Games	(Japan) Tokyo	5th	Long jump	8.15 m	
2023	World Championships	(Hungary) Budapest	2nd	High jump	2.36 m	=WL

=== Circuit wins and titles ===
- 2022 Diamond League: high jump (silver)

== National titles ==
Senior level

Harrison won six national championships.

- NCAA Athletics Championships
  - High jump: 2019, 2021
  - Long jump: 2019, 2021
- NCAA Indoor Athletics Championships
  - High jump: 2021
  - Long jump: 2021

== Personal bests ==
Outdoor

- High jump: 2.36 m ( (United States) College Station, May 14, 2021 and Budapest, August 22, 2023)
- Long jump: 8.47 m ( (United States) Eugene, June 28, 2021)

Indoor

- High jump: 2.30 m ( (United States) Fayetteville, March 12, 2021)
- Long jump: 8.45 m ( (United States) Fayetteville, March 12, 2021)
