= Shelby McEwen =

American high jumper (born 1996)

Shelby McEwen OLY
Personal information
- Nationality: American
- Born: April 6, 1996 (age 30) Abbeville, Mississippi, U.S.
- Height: 6 ft 3 in (191 cm)
- Weight: 163 lb (74 kg)

Sport
- Country: United States
- Sport: Track and field
- Event: High Jump
- College team: Alabama Crimson Tide (2018–2019)

Achievements and titles
- Personal best: 2.36 (Paris 2024)
Medal record
Men's athletics
Representing United States
Olympic Games
Silver medal – second place	2024 Paris	High jump
World Indoor Championships
Silver medal – second place	2024 Glasgow	High Jump

Shelby McEwen OLY (born April 6, 1996) is an American track and field athlete who competes in the high jump.

From 2015 to 2017, McEwen attended Northwest Mississippi Community College; he was a member of their basketball team and competed unattached in track and field. He then started competing for the Alabama Crimson Tide, and participated in the indoor and outdoor track seasons in 2018 and 2019.

In 2019, he jumped 2.31 m indoor and then 2.30 m outdoor, as second at 2019 USA Track & Field Outdoor Championships, qualifying for the 2019 World Championships in Doha, where he was the first non-qualifier for the final.

On May 22, 2021, he jumped 2.33 m at Roy P. Drachman Stadium, Tucson, Arizona, the qualifying standard for the 2020 Summer Games, before finishing third with 2.30 m at the 2020 US Olympic Trials. He finished twelfth at the 2020 Summer Olympics with a jump of 2.27 m.

At the 2024 Summer Olympics, McEwen jumped 2.36 m and was tied for the lead with New Zealand's Hamish Kerr; both men were offered the option to share the gold medal. Kerr wanted to proceed to a jump-off, and McEwen agreed. McEwen ended up losing to Kerr and got the silver medal.
