= 2018 USA Indoor Track and Field Championships =

2018 USA Track & Field Indoor Championships
- Dates: February 16–18
- Host city: Albuquerque, New Mexico, United States
- Venue: Albuquerque Convention Center
- Level: Senior
- Type: Indoor
- Events: 30 (men: 15; women: 15)

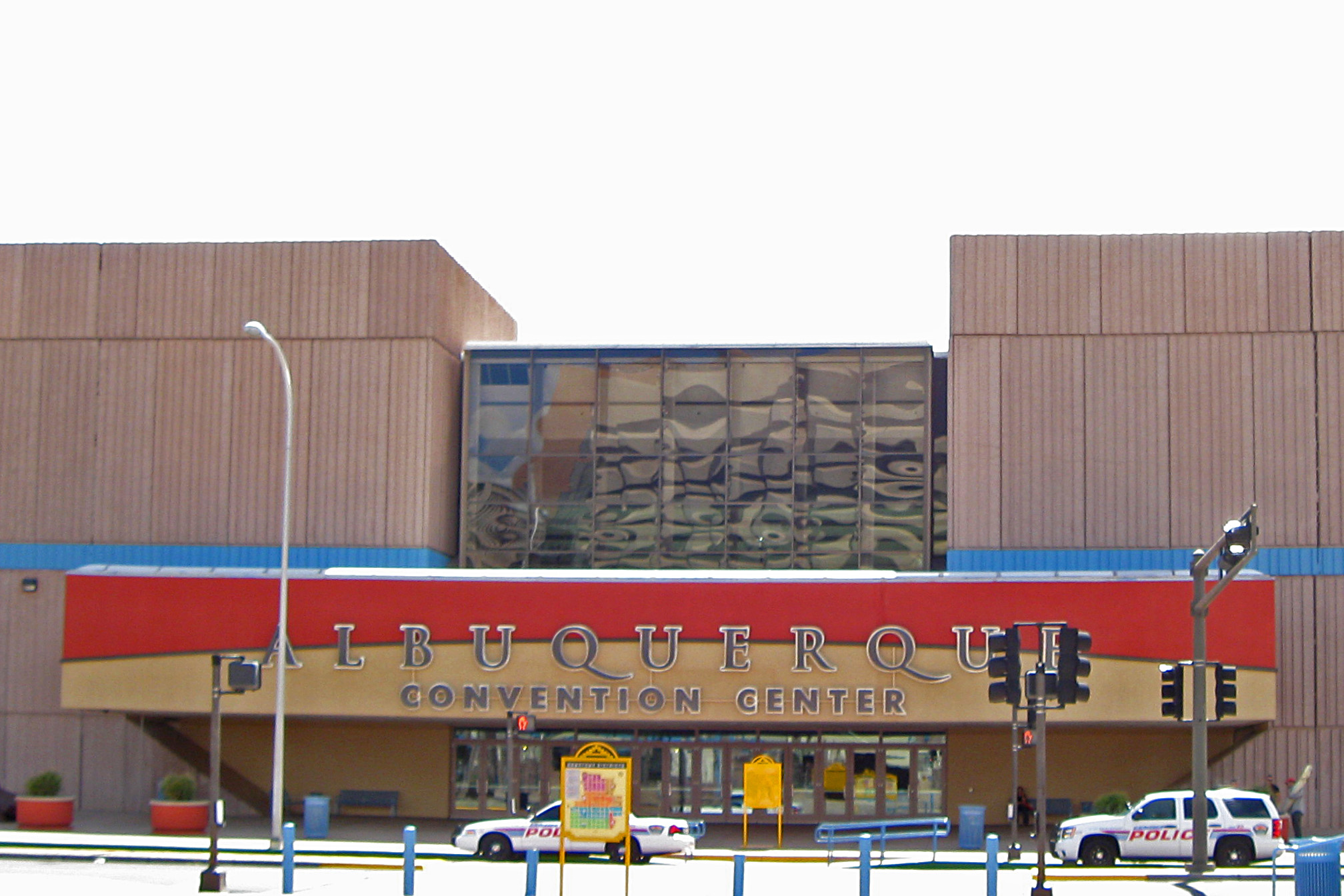
Albuquerque Convention Center

The 2018 USA Indoor Track and Field Championships were held at the Albuquerque Convention Center in Albuquerque, New Mexico. Organized by USA Track and Field (USATF), the three-day competition took place from February 16 to February 18 and served as the national championships in indoor track and field for the United States. All marks in the competition are considered at altitude. The meet serves for the selection of American representatives at the 2018 IAAF World Indoor Championships held in Birmingham March 1 to March 4.

== Schedule ==
H	Heats	½	Semi-finals	F	Final
M = morning session, A = afternoon session

Men
Date →	16 February	17 February		18 February		
Event ↓	A	M	A	M	A	
60 metres			H		½	F
400 metres			H		½	F
800 metres			H		F	
1500 metres					F	
3000 metres			F			
3000 metres race walk					F	
60 metres hurdles			H		½	F
High jump			F			
Pole vault			F			
Long jump			F			
Triple jump					F	
Shot put					F	
35 lbs Weight throw			F			
Heptathlon	F					

Women
Date →	16 February	17 February		18 February		
Event ↓	A	M	A	M	A	
60 metres			H		½	F
400 metres			H		½	F
800 metres			H		F	
1500 metres					F	
3000 metres			F			
3000 metres race walk					F	
60 metres hurdles			H		½	F
High jump					F	
Pole vault					F	
Long jump					F	
Triple jump			F			
Shot put			F			
20 lbs Weight throw					F	
Pentathlon	F					

== Medal summary ==
=== Men ===
Event	Gold		Silver		Bronze	
60 meters	Christian Coleman	6.34 WR	Ronnie Baker	6.40	Michael Rodgers	6.50
400 meters	Michael Cherry	45.53	Aldrich Bailey	45.59	Vernon Norwood	45.60
800 meters	Donavan Brazier	1:45.10 CR	Drew Windle	1:46.29	Erik Sowinski	1:47.02
1500 meters	Paul Chelimo	3:42.91	Ben Blankenship	3:43.09	Craig Engels	3:43.29
3000 meters	Paul Chelimo	7:57.88	Shadrack Kipchirchir	7:58.42	Ryan Hill	7:58.69
60 m hurdles	Jarret Eaton	7.43	Aries Merritt	7.46	Devon Allen	7.49
3000 m racewalk	Nick Christie	12:09.96	Emmanuel Corvera	12:24.10	Alexander Bellavance	12:30.04
High jump	Erik Kynard	2.30 m (7 ft 6 1/2 in)	Jeron Robinson	2.27 m (7 ft 5 1/4 in)	Ricky Robertson	2.24 m (7 ft 4 in)
Pole vault	Scott Houston	5.83 m (19 ft 1 1/2 in)	Sam Kendricks	5.78 m (18 ft 11 1/2 in)	Mike Arnold	5.78 m (18 ft 11 1/2 in)
Long jump	Jarrion Lawson	8.38 m (27 ft 5 3/4 in)	Marquis Dendy	8.22 m (26 ft 11 1/2 in)	Michael Hartfield	8.18 m (26 ft 10 in)
Triple jump	Will Claye	17.28 m (56 ft 8 1/4 in)	Chris Carter	17.20 m (56 ft 5 in)	Omar Craddock	17.11 m (56 ft 1 1/2 in)
Shot put	Ryan Whiting	20.65 m (67 ft 8 3/4 in)	Darrell Hill	20.02 m (65 ft 8 in)	Jon Jones	19.93 m (65 ft 4 1/2 in)
Weight Throw	Conor McCullough	23.84 m (78 ft 2 1/2 in)	Alex Young	23.50 m (77 ft 1 in)	Sean Donnelly	23.46 m (76 ft 11 1/2 in)
Heptathlon	Jeremy Taiwo	5935 points	Wolf Mahler	5923 points	Devon Williams	5842 points
Masters (75+) 200 meters exhibition	Robert Lida	29.95	Tom Bowden	30.42	Frank Strouse	31.71
Masters (60-70) pole vault exhibition	William Nesbitt	3.81 m (12 ft 6 in)	Brad McFarling	3.50 m (11 ft 5 3/4 in)	Bob Crites	3.35 m (10 ft 11 3/4 in)

=== Women ===
Event	Gold		Silver		Bronze	
60 meters	Javianne Oliver	7.02	Destiny Carter	7.19	Teahna Daniels	7.22
400 meters	Courtney Okolo	51.16	Shakima Wimbley	51.17	Phyllis Francis	51.19
800 meters	Ajeé Wilson	2:01.60	Raevyn Rogers	2:01.74	Kaela Edwards	2:02.77
1500 meters	Shelby Houlihan	4:13.07	Colleen Quigley	4:13.21	Shannon Osika	4:13.60
3000 meters	Shelby Houlihan	9:00.08	Katie Mackey	9:01.68	Emma Coburn	9:01.85
60 m hurdles	Sharika Nelvis	7.70 AR	Kendra Harrison	7.72	Christina Manning	7.73
3000 m racewalk	Maria Michta-Coffey	13:00.53	Miranda Melville	13:33.19	Robyn Stevens	13:34.58
High jump	Vashti Cunningham	1.97 m (6 ft 5 1/2 in)	Inika McPherson	1.91 m (6 ft 3 in)	Nicole Greene	1.88 m (6 ft 2 in)
Pole vault	Katie Nageotte	4.91 m (16 ft 1 1/4 in)	Sandi Morris	4.86 m (15 ft 11 1/4 in)	Jenn Suhr	4.81 m (15 ft 9 1/4 in)
Long jump	Brittney Reese	6.88 m (22 ft 6 3/4 in)	Quanesha Burks	6.65 m (21 ft 9 3/4 in)	Jessie Gaines	6.47 m (21 ft 2 1/2 in)
Triple jump	Tori Franklin	14.15 m (46 ft 5 in)	Andrea Geubelle	13.78 m (45 ft 2 1/2 in)	Viershanie Latham	13.34 m (43 ft 9 in)
Shot put	Daniella Bunch	18.10 m (59 ft 4 1/2 in)	Erin Farmer	17.98 m (58 ft 11 3/4 in)	Jeneva Stevens	17.77 m (58 ft 3 1/2 in)
Weight Throw	DeAnna Price	24.51 m (80 ft 4 3/4 in)	Jeneva Stevens	24.23 m (79 ft 5 3/4 in)	Gwen Berry	23.93 m (78 ft 6 in)
Pentathlon	Erica Bougard	4760 points	Kendell Williams	4508 points	Alex Gochenour	4405 points
Masters (65+) 200 meters exhibition	Kathy Bergen	33.23	Marcella Hale Hall	33.75	Brenda Matthews	34.51

== Qualification ==
The 2018 USA Outdoor Track and Field Championships serve as the qualification meet for United States representatives in international competitions, including the 2018 IAAF World Indoor Championships. In order to be entered, athletes need to achieve a qualifying standard mark and place in the top 2 in their event and top 12 in the world. The United States team, as managed by USATF, can also bring a qualified back up athlete in case one of the team members is unable to perform.

Additionally, defending World Champions received byes into the World Championships. The athletes eligible for a bye are:

=== Defending World Champions ===
- Michelle Carter – Shot put
- Brittney Reese – Long jump
- Barbara Pierre – 60 m
- Nia Ali – 60 m hurdles
- Vashti Cunningham – High jump
- Jenn Suhr – Pole vault
- Trayvon Bromell – 60 m
- Boris Berian – 800 meters
- Matthew Centrowitz – 1500 meters
- Marquis Dendy – Long jump
- Ashton Eaton – Heptathlon (retired)
