= Authorised Neutral Athletes at the World Athletics Championships =

- WA code: ANA
- Medals: Gold 3 Silver 8 Bronze 1 Total 12

World Athletics Championships appearances (overview)
- 2017; 2019; 2022; 2023; 2025

Other related appearances
- Russia (1993–2015)

Authorised Neutral Athletes had participated at the World Athletics Championships in the 2017 and 2019 World Championships in Athletics, winning eight podiums, including three world titles.

The IAAF has established that the Authorised Neutral Athletes team will not have to appear in the medal table in any competition.

== Medalists ==
Edition	Medal	Athlete	Event
London 2017	Gold	Mariya Lasitskene	Women's high jump
London 2017	Silver	Sergey Shubenkov	Men's 110 metres hurdles
London 2017	Silver	Darya Klishina	Women's long jump
London 2017	Silver	Valeriy Pronkin	Men's hammer throw
London 2017	Silver	Sergey Shirobokov	Men's 20 kilometres walk
London 2017	Silver	Danil Lysenko	Men's high jump
Doha 2019	Gold	Mariya Lasitskene	Women's high jump
Doha 2019	Gold	Anzhelika Sidorova	Women's pole vault
Doha 2019	Silver	Sergey Shubenkov	Men's 110 metres hurdles
Doha 2019	Silver	Mikhail Akimenko	Men's high jump
Doha 2019	Silver	Vasiliy Mizinov	Men's 20 km walk
Doha 2019	Bronze	Ilya Ivanyuk	Men's high jump

== Medal count ==
Edition	Competitors			Men			Women			Total			
Edition	Tot.	Men	Women	1st place, gold medalist(s)	2nd place, silver medalist(s)	3rd place, bronze medalist(s)	1st place, gold medalist(s)	2nd place, silver medalist(s)	3rd place, bronze medalist(s)	1st place, gold medalist(s)	2nd place, silver medalist(s)	3rd place, bronze medalist(s)	Tot.
2017 London	19	12	7	0	4	0	1	1	0	1	5	0	6
2019 Doha	29	13	16	0	3	1	2	0	0	2	3	1	6
				0	7	1	3	1	0	3	8	1	12
