= Jeron Robinson =

American track and field athlete

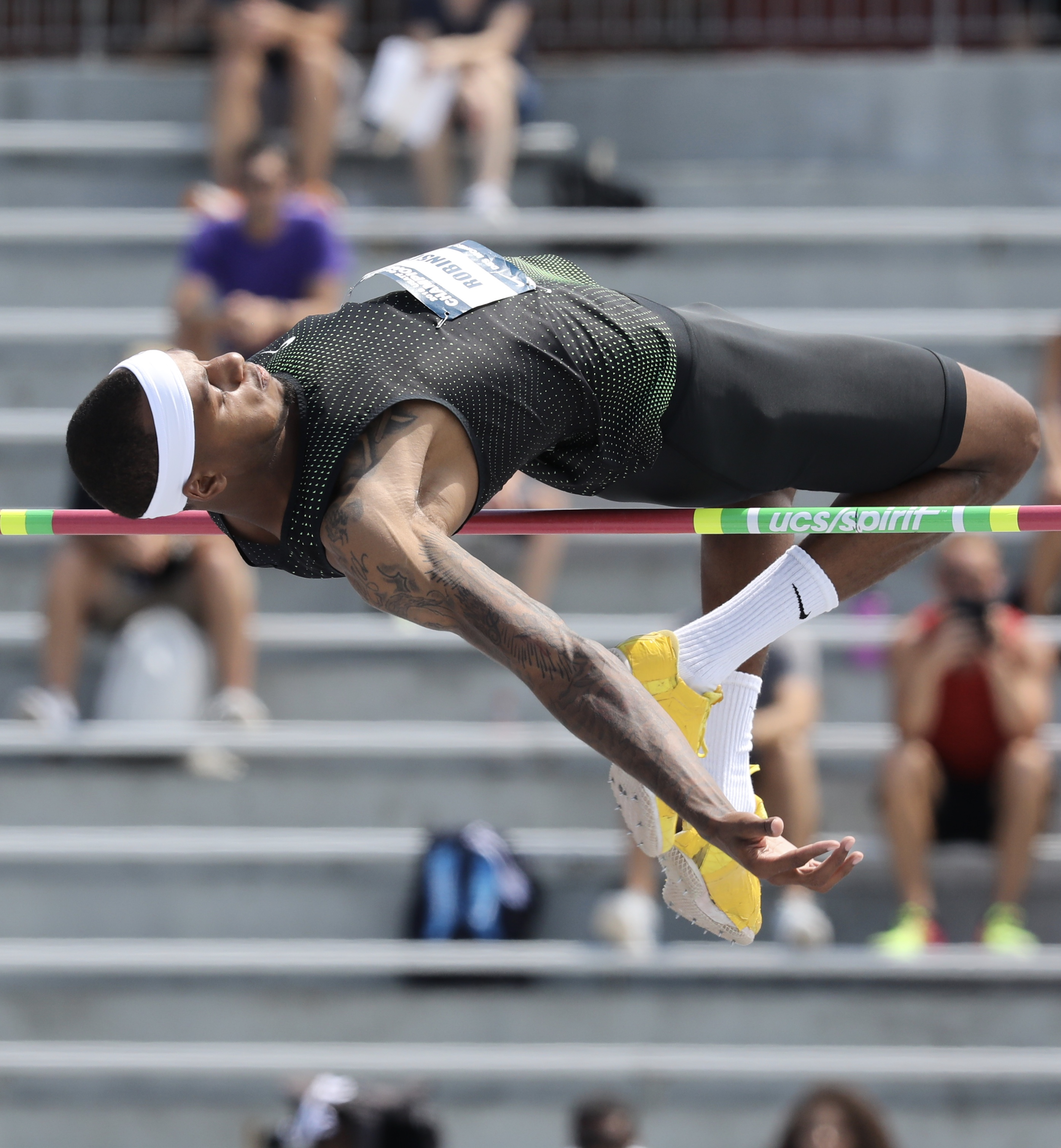
- Robinson in 2018

Personal information
- Nationality: American
- Born: April 30, 1991 (age 35) Angleton, TX
- Height: 6 ft 3 in (1.91 m)

Sport
- Country: United States
- Sport: Track and field athlete
- Event: High Jump
- College team: Texas A&M University–Kingsville
- Team: Nike, Inc.
- Turned pro: 2016
- Coached by: Drew Fucci
- Retired: 2022

Achievements and titles
- Personal best: High jump: 2.31 m (7 ft 6 3/4 in)
Medal record
Men's athletics
Representing the United States
NACAC Championships
Gold medal – first place	2018 Toronto

Jeron Robinson (born April 30, 1991, in Angleton, Texas) is an American track and field high jumper. He is a Five time NCAA Div II Outdoor Champion (2013-2016) while jumping for Texas A&M–Kingsville. His 2015 victory was capped by a personal best 2.31 m (7 ft 6 3/4 in), to set the NCAA Division II record. He also won the 2013 DII Indoor Championships, finishing second and third the following years. He was the USTFCCCA Div. II Male Athlete of the Year in 2014 and 2015. Robinson was Inducted into The hall of Fame By Texas A&M University-Kingsville in 2026.

In 2017, he repeated his 2015 feat finishing 4th at the USA Outdoor Track and Field Championships. in 2017, due to Erik Kynard already holding a bye as Diamond League Champion, Robinson advanced to the 2017 World Championships.

Robinson took the 2018 USA championship men's high jump title with a Jump of 2.31m He also did a Repeat The following Year of 2019 to Defend His Title in the USA Men’s High jump with a Leap of 2.30M

Doing so Robinson hit the qualifying mark to advance on to the 2019 USA World team, where he competed in Doha Qatar where he made the mens high jump final with a jump of 2.29M

== Competition Record ==
Jeron Robinson signed to representing Nike, Inc. and continues to do so since his 2017 US Indoor Championships.

Representing the United States	Event	Venue	Place	Height
2018 NACAC Championships – Results#High jump	High jump	Toronto, Canada	1st	2.28 m (7 ft 5 3/4 in) CR
2017 World Championships in Athletics – Men's high jump	High jump	London	26th	2.17 m (7 ft 1 1/4 in)
2016 TrackTown Classic	High jump	Edmonton, Canada	1st	2.23 m (7 ft 3 3/4 in)
Athletics at the 2015 Pan American Games – Men's high jump	High jump	Toronto, Canada	4th	2.28 m (7 ft 5 3/4 in)
US National Championship	Event	Venue	Place	Height
2019 USA Indoor Track and Field Championships	High Jump	Ocean Breeze, New York	1st	2.24 m (7 ft 4 in)
2018 USA Outdoor Track and Field Championships	High Jump	Des Moines, Iowa	1st	2.31 m (7 ft 6 3/4 in)
2018 USA Indoor Track and Field Championships	High Jump	Albuquerque, New Mexico	2nd	2.27 m (7 ft 5 1/4 in)
2017 USA Outdoor Track and Field Championships	High Jump	Sacramento, California	4th	2.27 m (7 ft 5 1/4 in)
2017 USA Indoor Track and Field Championships	High Jump	Albuquerque, New Mexico	5th	2.21 m (7 ft 3 in)
2016 United States Olympic Trials (track and field)	High Jump	Eugene, Oregon	15th	NH @ 2.14 m (7 ft 1/4 in)
2015 USA Outdoor Track and Field Championships	High Jump	Eugene, Oregon	4th	2.28 m (7 ft 5 3/4 in)
2014 USA Outdoor Track and Field Championships	High Jump	Sacramento, California	6th	2.25 m (7 ft 4 1/2 in)
2013 USA Outdoor Track and Field Championships	High Jump	Des Moines, Iowa	9th	2.20 m (7 ft 2 1/2 in)
2011 USA Outdoor Track and Field Championships	High Jump	Eugene, Oregon	17th	NH @ 2.15 m (7 ft 1/2 in)

== Texas A&M-Kingsville Javelinas ==
Representing Texas A&M-Kingsville Javelinas
Year	Lone Star Conference Indoor track and field Championship	NCAA Division II Indoor track and field Championship	Lone Star Conference Outdoor track and field Championship	NCAA Division II Outdoor track and field Championship
2016	High Jump 1st 2.29 m (7 ft 6 in)	High Jump 1st 2.21 m (7 ft 3 in)	High Jump 1st 2.20 m (7 ft 2 1/2 in)	High Jump 2nd 2.16 m (7 ft 1 in)
2015	High Jump 1st 2.11 m (6 ft 11 in)	High Jump 3rd 2.18 m (7 ft 1 3/4 in)	High Jump 1st 2.31 m (7 ft 6 3/4 in)	High Jump 1st 2.19 m (7 ft 2 in)
2014	High Jump 1st 2.22 m (7 ft 3 1/4 in)	High Jump 2nd 2.16 m (7 ft 1 in)	High Jump 1st 2.21 m (7 ft 3 in)	High Jump 1st 2.30 m (7 ft 6 1/2 in)
2013	High Jump 1st 2.03 m (6 ft 7 3/4 in); Long Jump 8th 6.62 m (21 ft 8 1/2 in)	High Jump 1st 2.24 m (7 ft 4 in)	High Jump 1st 2.24 m (7 ft 4 in); Long Jump 16th 6.70 m (21 ft 11 3/4 in)m/s +1.4	High Jump 1st 2.24 m (7 ft 4 in)

== Prep ==
Prior to Texas A&M-Kingville, Robinson jumped for William B. Travis High School in Austin, Texas, where he set the school record at 7 ft 2 in (2.18 m) at 2010 Texas Relays.

Robinson placed second in the high jump at 2010 University Interscholastic League State Track & Field Meet clearing a bar at 7 ft 0 in (2.13 m) as a senior.

Robinson set a 2009 season best in 2.16 m (7 ft 1 in) as a junior.
