= Donald Thomas (high jumper) =

Bahamian high jumper (born 1984)

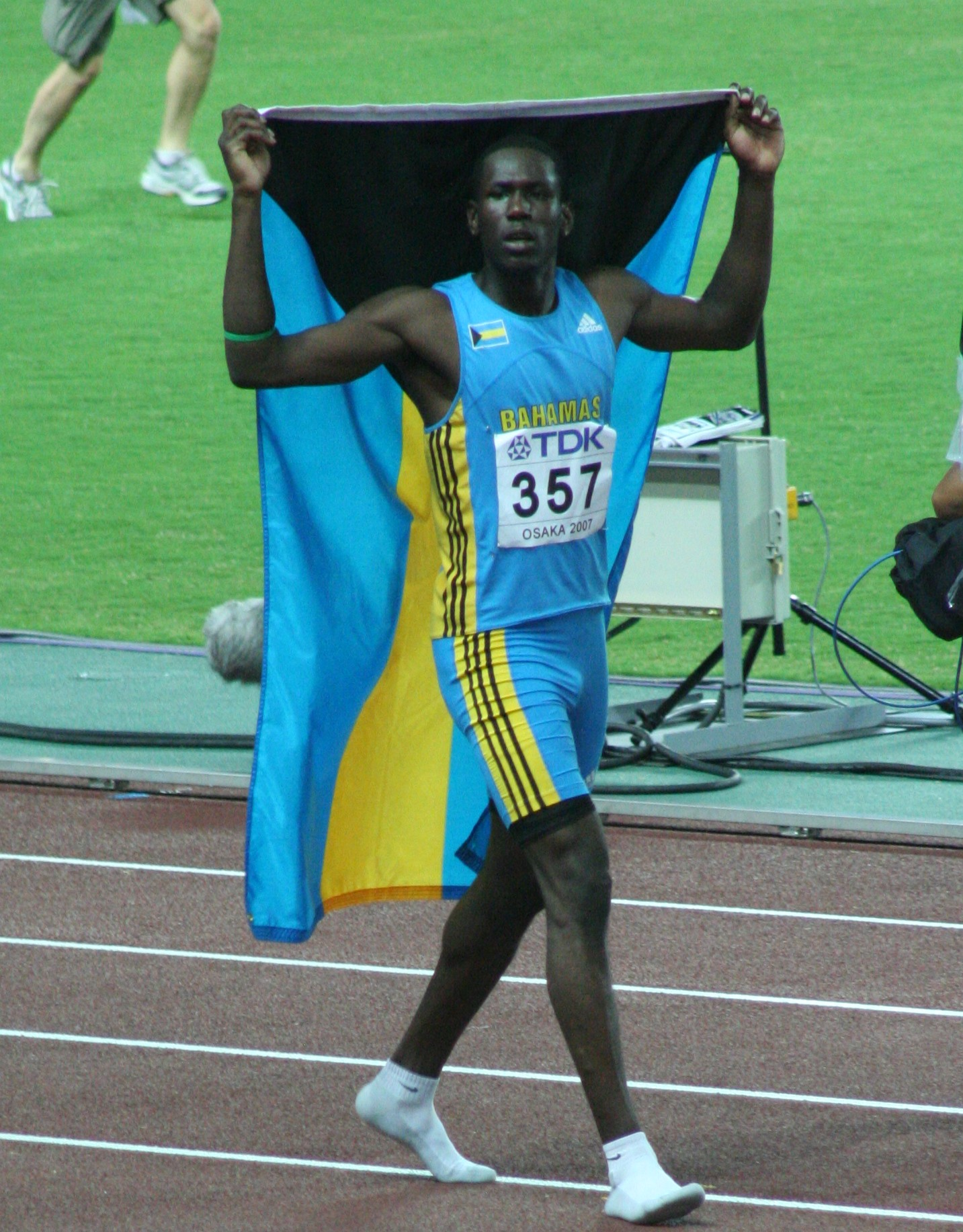
- Thomas celebrating in Osaka 2007

Personal information
- Full name: Donald Alexander Thomas
- Born: 1 July 1984 (age 42) Freeport, Bahamas
- Height: 1.91 m (6 ft 3 in)
- Weight: 81 kg (179 lb)

Sport
- Sport: Track and field
- Event: High jump
- College team: Auburn Tigers

Achievements and titles
- Personal best: 2.37 m
Medal record
Men's athletics
Representing the Bahamas
World Championships
Gold medal – first place	2007 Osaka	High jump
Commonwealth Games
Gold medal – first place	2010 Delhi	High jump
NACAC Championships
Silver medal – second place	2025 Freeport	High Jump
Bronze medal – third place	2018 Toronto	High Jump
Bronze medal – third place	2022 Freeport	High Jump
Pan American Games
Gold medal – first place	2011 Guadalajara	High jump
Silver medal – second place	2007 Rio de Janeiro	High jump
Bronze medal – third place	2015 Toronto	High jump
Bronze medal – third place	2023 Santiago	High jump
CAC Games
Gold medal – first place	2010 Mayaguez	High Jump
Gold medal – first place	2018 Barranquilla	High Jump
NACAC Championships
Bronze medal – third place	2018 Toronto	High Jump
Bronze medal – third place	2022 Freeport	High Jump
Representing Americas
Continental Cup
Gold medal – first place	2018 Ostrava	High jump
Silver medal – second place	2010 Split	High jump

Donald Alexander Thomas (born 1 July 1984) is a Bahamian high jumper from Freeport, Bahamas.

== Biography ==
Thomas initially played basketball at Bishop Michael Eldon School in Freeport, Bahamas, before taking up high jump in January 2006 while studying at Lindenwood University in Saint Charles, Missouri, where he played on the university's basketball team. He tried high jump for the first time when challenged by members of the track and field team, who were reacting to his claims about his ability to slam dunk. Thomas cleared 6 ft 6 in (1.98 m) on his first attempt and 7 ft (2.1 m) on his third-ever jump. The athletes then sought the head track coach, Lane Lohr, who entered Thomas in a meet two days later at Eastern Illinois University. At the meet, he cleared 7 ft 3.25 in (2.2162 m) on his seventh-ever jump.

In March 2006, Thomas placed second at the 2006 NAIA Indoor Track & Field National Championships with a height of 7 ft 1.75 in (2.1781 m). Later that month, just two months after taking up high jump, he finished fourth at the 2006 Commonwealth Games in Melbourne with a jump of 2.23 m. Not yet experienced at high jump, Thomas gained notoriety at the Commonwealth Games for not measuring his run-up, competing in shoes without spikes, and putting his arms behind his back to land on the mat as if breaking his fall.

During the 2007 indoor season, he cleared 2.30 metres for the first time and in March jumped 2.33 metres in Fayetteville, Arkansas. In July 2007 he cleared 2.35 metres in Salamanca, Spain. The result was a new personal best and the world season's best at the time. He then won the 2007 World Championships in Osaka, Japan, again with a 2.35 jump. He also won gold at the 2007 IAAF World Athletics Final. That year, he also won the IAAF Newcomer of the Year and the Bahamas Amateur Athletic Association Athlete of the Year.

The Olympics in 2008, however, turned out to be a major disappointment for Thomas. He made only 2.20 in the qualifying round and finished 21st overall.

Thomas won the gold medal in the high jump at the 2010 Commonwealth Games in Delhi, India. In the final, he was the only competitor to clear the height of 2.32, which he managed on the first attempt. His countryman Trevor Barry won the silver medal in the event. In 2011, he won the gold medal in the high jump at the Pan American Games in Guadalajara, Mexico, again with a height of 2.32.

Thomas competed in the 2012 Summer Olympics in London, United Kingdom. In qualification, he cleared 2.16, passed on 2.21, failed to clear 2.26, and did not advance to the final.

Thomas represented the Bahamas at the 2016 Summer Olympics in Rio de Janeiro, Brazil. He made the final for the first time at an Olympic competition and finished in equal 7th place with a jump of 2.29.

He competed at the 2020 and 2024 Summer Olympics.

== Competition record ==
Year	Competition	Venue	Position	Notes
Representing the Bahamas
2006	Commonwealth Games	Melbourne, Australia	4th	2.23 m
2006	NACAC U23 Championships	Santo Domingo, Dominican Republic	2nd	2.21 m
2006	Central American and Caribbean Games	Cartagena, Colombia	4th	2.13 m
2007	Pan American Games	Rio de Janeiro, Brazil	2nd	2.30 m
2007	World Championships	Osaka, Japan	1st	2.35 m
2008	Olympic Games	Beijing, China	21st (q)	2.20 m
2009	World Championships	Berlin, Germany	15th (q)	2.27 m
2010	World Indoor Championships	Doha, Qatar	15th (q)	2.18 m
2010	Central American and Caribbean Games	Mayagüez, Puerto Rico	1st	2.28 m
2010	Commonwealth Games	Delhi, India	1st	2.32 m
2011	World Championships	Daegu, South Korea	11th	2.20 m
2011	Pan American Games	Guadalajara, Mexico	1st	2.32 m
2012	World Indoor Championships	Istanbul, Turkey	15th (q)	2.22 m
2012	Olympic Games	London, United Kingdom	30th (q)	2.16 m
2013	Central American and Caribbean Championships	Morelia, Mexico	–	NM
2013	World Championships	Moscow, Russia	6th	2.32 m
2014	World Indoor Championships	Sopot, Poland	–	NM
2014	Commonwealth Games	Glasgow, United Kingdom	9th	2.21 m
2015	Pan American Games	Toronto, Canada	3rd	2.28 m
2015	World Championships	Beijing, China	6th	2.29 m
2016	World Indoor Championships	Portland, United States	10th	2.25 m
2016	Olympic Games	Rio de Janeiro, Brazil	7th	2.29 m
2017	World Championships	London, United Kingdom	22nd (q)	2.22 m
2018	World Indoor Championships	Birmingham, United Kingdom	6th	2.20 m
2018	Commonwealth Games	Gold Coast, Australia	4th	2.27 m
2018	Central American and Caribbean Games	Barranquilla, Colombia	1st	2.28 m
2018	NACAC Championships	Toronto, Canada	3rd	2.28 m
2019	Pan American Games	Lima, Peru	11th	2.10 m
2019	World Championships	Doha, Qatar	19th (q)	2.22 m
2021	Olympic Games	Tokyo, Japan	25th (q)	2.21 m
2022	World Indoor Championships	Belgrade, Serbia	11th	2.20 m
2022	World Championships	Eugene, United States	23rd (q)	2.21 m
2022	NACAC Championships	Freeport, Bahamas	3rd	2.25 m
2023	World Championships	Budapest, Hungary	16th (q)	2.25 m
2023	Pan American Games	Santiago, Chile	3rd	2.24 m
2024	World Indoor Championships	Glasgow, United Kingdom	9th	2.15 m
2024	Olympic Games	Paris, France	–	NM
2025	NACAC Championships	Freeport, Bahamas	2nd	2.21 m
2025	World Championships	Tokyo, Japan	19th (q)	2.21 m
2026	Commonwealth Games	Glasgow, United Kingdom	6th	2.10 m

Olympic Games
Preceded by Shaunae Miller	Flag bearer for Bahamas; Tokyo 2020 with Joanna Evans	Succeeded by Devynne Charlton; Steven Gardiner
Achievements
Preceded by (Russia) Andrey Silnov	Men's High Jump Best Year Performance alongside Stefan Holm, Yaroslav Rybakov and Kyriacos Ioannou; 2007	Succeeded by (Russia) Andrey Silnov
