= Athletics at the 2015 Pan American Games – Men's high jump =

Men's high jump at the 2015 Pan American Games
- Venue: CIBC Pan Am and Parapan Am Athletics Stadium
- Dates: July 25
- Competitors: 11 from 7 nations
- Winning height: 2.37

Medalists
Gold medal	Derek Drouin	Canada
Silver medal	Michael Mason	Canada
Bronze medal	Donald Thomas	Bahamas

The men's high jump competition of the athletics events at the 2015 Pan American Games took place on July 25 at the CIBC Pan Am and Parapan Am Athletics Stadium. The defending Pan American Games champion is Donald Thomas of the Bahamas.

== Records ==
Prior to this competition, the existing world and Pan American Games records were as follows:

World record	Javier Sotomayor (CUB)	2.45	Salamanca, Spain	July 27, 1993
Pan American Games record	Javier Sotomayor (CUB)	2.40	Mar del Plata, Argentine	March 25, 1995

== Qualification ==
Each National Olympic Committee (NOC) was able to enter up to two entrants providing they had met the minimum standard (2.17) in the qualifying period (January 1, 2014 to June 28, 2015).

== Schedule ==
Date	Time	Round
July 25, 2015	18:50	Final

== Results ==
All results shown are in meters.

KEY:	q	Best non-qualifiers	Q	Qualified	NR	National record	PB	Personal best	SB	Seasonal best	DQ	Disqualified

=== Final ===
Rank	Name	Nationality	2.15	2.20	2.25	2.28	2.31	2.34	2.37	2.41	Mark	Notes
1st place, gold medalist(s)	Derek Drouin	Canada	o	o	o	xo	o	xxo	xo	xxx	2.37	SB
2nd place, silver medalist(s)	Michael Mason	Canada	o	o	o	xo	o	xxx			2.31	
3rd place, bronze medalist(s)	Donald Thomas	Bahamas	o	o	o	xo	xxx				2.28	
4	Jeron Robinson	United States	o	o	xo	xxo	xxx				2.28	
4	Jesse Williams	United States	o	o	xo	xxo	xxx				2.28	
6	Ryan Ingraham	Bahamas	o	o	o	xx–	x				2.25	
7	Fernando Ferreira	Brazil	xo	o	xxx						2.20	
7	Edgar Rivera	Mexico	xo	o	xxx						2.20	
9	Talles Silva	Brazil	o	xxo	xxx						2.20	
10	Eure Yáñez	Venezuela	o	xx–	x						2.15	
11	Sergio Mestre	Cuba	xo	xxx							2.15	
