= 2018 IAAF World Indoor Championships – Men's 800 metres =

Men's 800 metres at the 2018 IAAF World Indoor Championships
- Venue: Arena Birmingham
- Dates: 2–3 March
- Competitors: 10 from 8 nations
- Winning time: 1:47.47

Medalists
gold medal	Adam Kszczot	Poland
silver medal	Drew Windle	United States
bronze medal	Saúl Ordóñez	Spain

Video on YouTube Official Video

The men's 800 metres at the 2018 IAAF World Indoor Championships took place on 2 and 3 March 2018.

== Summary ==
Heats were held on the second day of competition to eliminate only four competitors, one of them turned out to be the world leader coming into these championships, American champion, Donavan Brazier. With lane violations being disqualified aggressively already at these championships, Brazier knew his fate and jogged the rest of his race. Led by Álvaro de Arriba, heat 1 turned out to be significantly faster than the final.

The final started with Mostafa Smaili taking the advantage at the break, edging out Saúl Ordóñez. Ordóñez took up a position on Smaili's shoulder, the rest of the field lined up behind them until two laps to go. Ordóñez moved out to the lead, and 2014 silver medalist Adam Kszczot moved from the back to quickly to take up the second position with Drew Windle covering the move. For the next lap, Ordóñez kept looking over his shoulder while keeping Kszczot at bay. At the bell, Kszczot cruised into the lead, the rest of the field, led by Elliot Giles swarmed forward, leaving Windle out the back. Through the final lap, Kszczot just extended his lead to take a four-metre victory. Behind him, Windle squeezed past Álvaro de Arriba and Smaili on the inside, then slid to the outside on the home straightaway to pass Giles and with a lean at the line, Ordóñez to take silver.

Following the race, Windle was disqualified for obstruction. The decision was later reversed on appeal, reinstating his silver medal.

== Results ==
=== Heats ===
The heats were started on 2 March at 19:13.

Rank	Heat	Name	Nationality	Time	Notes
1	1	Álvaro de Arriba	Spain	1:45.44	Q
2	1	Elliot Giles	Great Britain	1:45.46	Q, PB
3	1	Drew Windle	United States	1:45.52	q, PB
4	2	Adam Kszczot	Poland	1:47.02	Q
5	2	Mostafa Smaili	Morocco	1:47.08	Q
6	2	Saúl Ordóñez	Spain	1:47.11	q
7	1	Andreas Kramer	Sweden	1:47.21	
8	1	Hamada Mohamed	Egypt	1:47.65	NR
9	2	Antoine Gakeme	Burundi	1:49.66	
	2	Donavan Brazier	United States	DQ	163.3(a)

=== Final ===
The final was started 3 March at 19:35.

Rank	Name	Nationality	Time	Notes
1st place, gold medalist(s)	Adam Kszczot	Poland	1:47.47	
2nd place, silver medalist(s)	Drew Windle	United States	1:47.99	
3rd place, bronze medalist(s)	Saúl Ordóñez	Spain	1:48.01	
4	Elliot Giles	Great Britain	1:48.22	
5	Álvaro de Arriba	Spain	1:48.51	
6	Mostafa Smaili	Morocco	1:48.75	
