= Jamal Wilson =

Bahamian high jumper

Personal information
- Born: 1 September 1988 (age 37) Nassau, Bahamas
- Education: University of Texas Austin
- Height: 1.88 m (6 ft 2 in)
- Weight: 63 kg (139 lb)

Sport
- Sport: Athletics
- Event: High jump

Jamal Wilson (born 1 September 1988) is a Bahamian high jumper. He competed at the 2016 Summer Olympics and the 2020 Summer Olympics in Tokyo, in the men's high jump event.

His personal bests in the event are 2.30 metres outdoors (Nassau 2016) and 2.33 metres indoors (Banská Bystrica 2020).

== International competitions ==
Year	Competition	Venue	Position	Event	Notes
Representing the Bahamas
2005	CARIFTA Games (U20)	Bacolet, Trinidad and Tobago	1st	High jump	2.08 m
2005	World Youth Championships	Marrakesh, Morocco	22nd (q)	High jump	1.95 m
2005	Pan American Junior Championships	Windsor, Canada	12th	High jump	1.95 m
2006	CARIFTA Games (U20)	Les Abymes, Guadeloupe	1st	High jump	2.05 m
2006	Central American and Caribbean; Junior Championships (U20)	Port of Spain, Trinidad and Tobago	2nd	High jump	2.11 m
2006	World Junior Championships	Beijing, China	25th (q)	High jump	2.10 m
2007	CARIFTA Games (U20)	Providenciales, Turks and Caicos Islands	1st	High jump	2.20 m
2007	Pan American Junior Championships	São Paulo, Brazil	1st	High jump	2.11 m
2008	Central American and Caribbean Championships	Cali, Colombia	3rd	High jump	2.13 m
2008	NACAC U23 Championships	Toluca, Mexico	3rd	High jump	2.23 m
2010	NACAC U23 Championships	Miramar, United States	3rd	High jump	2.13 m
2011	Central American and Caribbean Championships	Mayagüez, Puerto Rico	6th	Triple jump	15.32 m
2013	Central American and Caribbean Championships	Morelia, Mexico	2nd	High jump	2.22 m
2014	Commonwealth Games	Glasgow, United Kingdom	14th (q)	High jump	2.11 m
2014	Pan American Sports Festival	Mexico City, Mexico	2nd	High jump	2.26 m
2014	Central American and Caribbean Games	Xalapa, Mexico	5th	High jump	2.18 m
2016	World Indoor Championships	Portland, United States	11th	High jump	2.20 m
2016	Olympic Games	Rio de Janeiro, Brazil	25th (q)	High jump	2.22 m
2018	World Indoor Championships	Birmingham, United Kingdom	9th	High jump	2.20 m
2018	Commonwealth Games	Gold Coast, Australia	2nd	High jump	2.21 (Q); 2.30 (F)
2018	Central American and Caribbean Games	Barranquilla, Colombia	5th	High jump	2.24 m
2018	NACAC Championships	Toronto, Canada	5th	High jump	2.22 m
2019	Pan American Games	Lima, Peru	–	High jump	NM
2021	Olympic Games	Tokyo, Japan	32nd (q)	High jump	2.17 m
