= 2018 IAAF World Indoor Championships – Men's high jump =

Men's high jump at the 2018 IAAF World Indoor Championships
- Venue: Arena Birmingham
- Dates: 1 March
- Competitors: 11 from 10 nations
- Winning height: 2.36

Medalists
gold medal	Danil Lysenko	Authorised Neutral Athletes
silver medal	Mutaz Essa Barshim	Qatar
bronze medal	Mateusz Przybylko	Germany

The men's high jump at the 2018 IAAF World Indoor Championships took place at Arena Birmingham in Birmingham, United Kingdom, on 1 March 2018.

The reigning outdoor world champion, Mutaz Essa Barshim of Qatar, led the field of eleven entries that year with his jump of 2.38 m (7 ft 9 1/2 in), set while winning the Asian indoor title. The previous world indoor champion, Italy's Gianmarco Tamberi, was not present to defend his title, though both minor medallists were present in Great Britain's Robert Grabarz and American Erik Kynard.

With the pits back to back in the center of the arena and no events on the track, the men shared center stage with the women's high jump.

== Summary ==
In a straight final format, the overall performance of the field was low, with six of the eleven athletes failing to clear more than the opening height of 2.20 m (7 ft 2 1/2 in) (Grabarz and former world champion Donald Thomas being the most prominent casualties). Poland's Sylwester Bednarek failed at the third height of 2.29 m (7 ft 6 in), leaving just Barshim, Kynard, Mateusz Przybylko and Danil Lysenko in contention. Lysenko and Barshim led with clean scorecards up to the height of 2.33 m (7 ft 7 1/2 in). Kynard and Przybylko both failed to achieve that height and the German athlete secured the bronze on countback – his first senior international medal. Lysenko and Barshim each failed their first two attempts at 2.36 m (7 ft 8 3/4 in) and after a third failure by Barshim, Lysenko cleared the height on his final attempt to become world champion. It was the first world title for the Russian, competing as an Authorised Neutral Athlete here, and reversed the positions the two had shared at the 2017 World Championships final the previous summer.

== Records ==
Standing records prior to the 2018 IAAF World Indoor Championships
World indoor record	Javier Sotomayor (CUB)	2.43	Budapest, Hungary	4 March 1989
Championship record	Javier Sotomayor (CUB)	2.43	Budapest, Hungary	4 March 1989
World Leading	Mutaz Essa Barshim (QAT)	2.38	Tehran, Iran	1 February 2018

== Results ==
The final was started at 18:45.

Rank	Name	Nationality	2.20	2.25	2.29	2.33	2.36	Mark	Notes
1st place, gold medalist(s)	Danil Lysenko	Authorised Neutral Athletes (ANA)	o	o	o	o	xxo	2.36	
2nd place, silver medalist(s)	Mutaz Essa Barshim	Qatar (QAT)	o	o	o	o	xxx	2.33	
3rd place, bronze medalist(s)	Mateusz Przybylko	Germany (GER)	xo	xxo	xo	xxx		2.29	
4	Erik Kynard	United States (USA)	o	o	xxo	xxx		2.29	
5	Sylwester Bednarek	Poland (POL)	xo	o	xxx			2.25	
6	Maksim Nedasekau	Belarus (BLR)	o	xxx				2.20	
6	Donald Thomas	Bahamas (BAH)	o	xxx				2.20	
6	Wang Yu	China (CHN)	o	xxx				2.20	
9	Tihomir Ivanov	Bulgaria (BUL)	xxo	xxx				2.20	
9	Jamal Wilson	Bahamas (BAH)	xxo	xxx				2.20	
9	Robbie Grabarz	Great Britain (GBR)	xxo	xxx				2.20	
