= Athletics at the 2006 Commonwealth Games – Men's high jump =

Men's high jump at the Commonwealth Games

The men's high jump event at the 2006 Commonwealth Games was held on March 20–22.

== Medalists ==
Gold	Silver	Bronze
Mark Boswell; Canada	Martyn Bernard; England	Kyriakos Ioannou; Cyprus

== Results ==
=== Qualification ===
Qualification: 2.20 m (Q) or at least 12 best (q) qualified for the final.

Rank	Group	Athlete	Nationality	1.90	1.95	2.00	2.05	2.10	2.15	Result	Notes
1	A	Mark Boswell	Canada	–	–	–	–	–	o	2.15	q
1	B	Ramsay Carelse	South Africa	–	–	–	–	o	o	2.15	q
1	B	Donald Thomas	Bahamas	–	–	o	o	o	o	2.15	q
4	B	Tom Parsons	England	–	–	–	xo	xxo	o	2.15	q
5	A	Martyn Bernard	England	–	–	–	–	o	xo	2.15	q
5	B	Nick Moroney	Australia	–	–	–	o	o	xo	2.15	q
7	B	Robert Mitchell	Wales	–	–	o	o	o	xxo	2.15	q
8	A	Ioannis Constantinou	Cyprus	–	–	–	o	o	xxx	2.10	q
8	A	Kyriakos Ioannou	Cyprus	–	–	–	o	o	–	2.10	q
8	A	Onnanye Ramohube	Botswana	–	o	o	o	o	xxx	2.10	q
8	B	Ben Challenger	England	–	–	–	–	o	xxx	2.10	q
8	B	James Grayman	Antigua and Barbuda	o	o	o	o	o	xxx	2.10	q
13	B	Darvin Edwards	Saint Lucia	o	o	o	xo	o	xxx	2.10	
14	A	Martin Aram	Isle of Man	–	–	o	o	xo	xxx	2.10	
14	A	Mark Taylor	Scotland	–	–	o	–	xo	xxx	2.10	
16	B	Kane Brigg	Australia	–	–	–	o	xxx		2.05	
16	B	Rajendra Prasad	Fiji	o	–	o	o	xxx		2.05	
18	B	Simon Phelan	Jersey	–	xxo	o	xo	xxx		2.05	
19	A	Ahmad Najwa Aqra	Malaysia	o	o	o	xx–	x		2.00	
	A	David Okot Edou	Uganda	x–	xx					NM	

=== Final ===
Rank	Athlete	Nationality	2.00	2.05	2.10	2.15	2.20	2.23	2.26	2.29	Result	Notes
1st place, gold medalist(s)	Mark Boswell	Canada	–	–	–	–	o	o	o	xxx	2.26	
2nd place, silver medalist(s)	Martyn Bernard	England	–	–	–	o	o	xo	xxo	xxx	2.26	SB
3rd place, bronze medalist(s)	Kyriakos Ioannou	Cyprus	–	–	o	o	o	o	xxx		2.23	
4	Donald Thomas	Bahamas	o	o	o	xxo	o	xo	xxx		2.23	
5	Ramsay Carelse	South Africa	–	–	o	o	xo	xxx			2.20	
5	Nick Moroney	Australia	–	o	o	o	xo	xxx			2.20	
7	Robert Mitchell	Wales	–	o	xo	o	xxx				2.15	
8	Ben Challenger	England	–	–	–	xo	xxx				2.15	
9	James Grayman	Antigua and Barbuda	o	o	o	xxx					2.10	
10	Ioannis Constantinou	Cyprus	–	o	xo	xxx					2.10	
11	Tom Parsons	England	–	xo	xo	xxx					2.10	
12	Onnanye Ramohube	Botswana	o	xo	xxo	xxx					2.10	
