= Authorised Neutral Athletes at the 2017 World Championships in Athletics =

- The flag used by the Authorised Neutral Athletes
- WA code: ANA

in London, United Kingdom 4–13 August 2017
- Competitors: 19 (12 men and 7 women) in 14 events
- Medals: Gold 1 Silver 5 Bronze 0 Total 6

World Championships in Athletics appearances (overview)
- 2017; 2019; 2022–2025

Other related appearances
- Russia (1993–2015)

The Authorised Neutral Athletes are Russian athletes who are permitted to compete in the 2017 World Championships in Athletics by special permission, despite the IAAF's suspension of the Russian Athletic Federation. In order to compete, Russian athletes must demonstrate that they were not involved in the doping scandal that precipitated Russia's suspension from international athletics.

== Background ==
In July 2016, Richard McLaren presented the report of the WADA Commission in Toronto, Ontario, indicating systematic state-sponsored subversion of the drug testing processes by the government of Russia during and subsequent to the 2014 Winter Olympics in Sochi, Russia. In December 2016, he published the second part of his report on doping in Russia.

Some Russians have called the allegations an anti-Russian plot while others consider that Russia was "just doing what the rest of the world does". Russian President Vladimir Putin said that Russia had "never supported any violations in sport, we have never supported it at the state level, and we will never support this" and that the allegations were part of an "anti-Russia policy" by the West. Aleksei Pushkov, chairman of Russia's parliamentary foreign affairs committee, said that the IAAF's decision to uphold its ban was "an act of political revenge against Russia for its independent foreign policy." A member of Russia's parliament, Vadim Dengin, stated, "The entire doping scandal is a pure falsification, invented to discredit and humiliate Russia." After the Court of Arbitration for Sport turned down an appeal by Russian athletes, pole vaulter Yelena Isinbayeva wrote, "Let all those pseudo clean foreign athletes breathe a sigh of relief and win their pseudo gold medals in our absence. They always did fear strength." The Ministry of Foreign Affairs called the ruling a "crime against sport". A poll by the Levada Center found that 14% of Russians believed that the country's athletes had doped in Sochi, 71% did not believe WADA's reports, and 15% decided not to answer.

A spokesman for Putin called Stepanova a "Judas". The Russian media have also criticised the Stepanovs. Yuliya Stepanova said, "All the news stories call me a traitor and not just traitor but a traitor to the Motherland." Vitaly Stepanov said, "I wasn't trying to expose Russia, I was trying to expose corrupt sports officials that are completely messing up competitions not just inside the country but globally." Frankfurter Allgemeine Zeitung reported that the Russian media portrayed the German documentaries as "part of a Western conspiracy with the aim of weakening the great nation that Vladimir Putin lifted from its knees." Hajo Seppelt had the "impression that he and the Stepanovs were being styled as enemies of the state".

Dick Pound described Russia's response as "a bit like when you get stopped for speeding on the freeway by the police and you say 'why me? everyone else was doing it'." He stated that if Russia's authorities had "responded to their issues they could easily have enough time to sort everything out in time for Rio. But instead they played the role of victims, claiming there was a plot against them for too long." Leonid Bershidsky, a Russian writer for Bloomberg View, wrote that Russia's "officials need to understand that "whataboutism" doesn't avert investigations". The Moscow correspondent of Deutsche Welle, Juri Rescheto, wrote that the response he saw in Russia "shows that the country is living in a parallel universe" and seeks to blame others. Writing for The New York Times, Andrew E. Kramer said that Russia responded to the IAAF's decision against reinstatement with "victimhood" reflecting a "culture of grievances that revolves around perceived slights and anti-Russian conspiracies taking place in the outside world, particularly in Western countries". The newspaper's editorial board also saw a "narrative of victimization" in Russia, and wrote that it resembled how the Soviet Union would respond to a punishment – by saying that it was "politically motivated, always a provocation, never justified. [Even] though the Cold War is long over, President Vladimir Putin remains stuck in the same, snarling defensive crouch in his responses to any accusations of Russian foul play". Andrew Osborn of Reuters wrote that the Russian government had "deftly deflected the blame by passing it off as a Western Cold War-style plot to sabotage Russia's international comeback." In response to Russia's opinion that the allegations were "politically motivated", WADA's former chief investigator, Jack Robertson, said that he saw politics "when Craig Reedie tried to intervene by writing emails to the Russian ministry to console them."

Match TV said that Americans had orchestrated the doping scandal and modern pentathlon champion Aleksander Lesun called it an unfair "attack" because "Doping is in all countries and there are violators everywhere." Following the IOC's announcement on 24 July 2016, Russian sports minister Vitaly Mutko said it was "a just and fair decision and we hope every federation will take the same kind of decision. Doping is a worldwide evil, not only of Russia." The Russian media's reaction was "nearly euphoric at points."

A reporter from Russian state-owned television told IOC President Thomas Bach that "It looked like you personally were helping us" and asked whether the doping investigation was a "political attack" on Russian athletes. After Russian athletes said that McLaren was about "politics" rather than sport, the British biathlon association stated that their comments were "brain-washed, deluded and dishonest" and decided to boycott an event in Russia. Russia's Deputy Prime Minister Vitaly Mutko said that athletes should be "punished" for calls to boycott.

== Petitions for inclusion ==
In 2016 and 2017 they were permitted to compete in the championship through special permission granted by the IAAF. The IAAF had suspended the Russian national federation from competing due to breach of anti-doping rules, and Klishina was the only member of the athletics team allowed to compete. This was then reversed on 13 August 2016. Klishina immediately appealed the decision, saying that she is "a clean athlete and have proved that already many times and beyond any doubt. Based in the US for three years now, I have been almost exclusively tested outside of the Anti-Doping system in question. I am falling victim to those who created a system of manipulating our beautiful sport and is guilty of using it for political purposes." On 15 August 2016, the eve of the long jump event, Klishina's appeal was upheld, once again allowing her to compete in the Olympics.

== Medalists ==
Medal	Athlete	Event	Date
Gold	Mariya Lasitskene	Women's high jump	12 August 2017
Silver	Sergey Shubenkov	Men's 110 metres hurdles	7 August 2017
Silver	Darya Klishina	Women's long jump	11 August 2017
Silver	Valeriy Pronkin	Men's hammer throw	11 August 2017
Silver	Sergey Shirobokov	Men's 20 kilometres walk	13 August 2017
Silver	Danil Lysenko	Men's high jump	13 August 2017

== Result ==
=== Men ===
Track and road events

Athlete	Event	Heat		Semifinal		Final	
Athlete	Event	Result	Rank	Result	Rank	Result	Rank
Sergey Shubenkov	110 metres hurdles	13.47	15 Q	13.22	3 q	13.14	2nd place, silver medalist(s)
Sergey Shirobokov	20 kilometres walk	—N/a				1:18.55	2nd place, silver medalist(s)

Field events

Athlete	Event	Qualification		Final	
Athlete	Event	Distance	Position	Distance	Position
Ilya Ivanyuk	High jump	2.29	7 q	2.25	=6
Danil Lysenko	High jump	2.31	3 Q	2.32	2nd place, silver medalist(s)
Ilya Mudrov	Pole vault	5.45	22	Did not advance	
Aleksandr Menkov	Long jump	8.07	5 Q	8.27	4
Aleksandr Lesnoy	Shot put	19.67	26	Did not advance	
Viktor Butenko	Discus throw	59.29	23	Did not advance	
Sergey Litvinov	Hammer throw	73.48	17	Did not advance	
Valeriy Pronkin	Hammer throw	75.09	10 q	78.16	2nd place, silver medalist(s)
Aleksey Sokirskiy	Hammer throw	75.50	8 Q	77.50 SB	5

Combined events – Decathlon

Athlete	Event	100 m	LJ	SP	HJ	400 m	110H	DT	PV	JT	1500 m	Final	Rank
Ilya Shkurenyov	Result	11.17	7.62 SB	13.48	2.08	49.02	DQ	DNS	DNS	–	–	DNF	–
Ilya Shkurenyov	Points	823	965	697	878	860	0	0	0			DNF	–

=== Women ===
Track and road events

Athlete	Event	Heat		Semifinal		Final	
Athlete	Event	Result	Rank	Result	Rank	Result	Rank
Klavdiya Afanaseva	20 kilometres walk	—N/a				DQ	–

Field events

Athlete	Event	Qualification		Final	
Athlete	Event	Distance	Position	Distance	Position
Irina Gordeeva	High jump	1.89	16	Did not advance	
Mariya Lasitskene	High jump	1.92	1 q	2.03	1st place, gold medalist(s)
Olga Mullina	Pole vault	4.55	8 q	4.55	8
Anzhelika Sidorova	Pole vault	NH	–	Did not advance	
Darya Klishina	Long jump	6.66	1 q	7.00	2nd place, silver medalist(s)
Vera Rebrik	Javelin throw	NM	–	Did not advance	
