= Víctor Moya =

Cuban high jumper

Personal information
- Full name: Víctor Rafael Moya Carvajal
- Born: October 24, 1982 (age 43) Santiago de Cuba, Santiago
- Height: 1.96 m (6 ft 5 in)
- Weight: 80 kg (176 lb)

Sport
- Country: Cuba
- Sport: Athletics
- Event: High jump
Medal record
Representing Cuba
World Championships
Silver medal – second place	2005 Helsinki	High jump
Pan American Games
Gold medal – first place	2007 Rio de Janeiro	High jump
Bronze medal – third place	2011 Guadalajara	High jump
- Updated on 27 June 2013

Víctor Rafael Moya Carvajal (born October 24, 1982, in Santiago de Cuba) is a Cuban high jumper.

== Career ==
Relatively young, he participated in his first major competition in the 2005 World Championships where he cleared 2.29 metres, a new personal best, and won a surprise silver medal along with Yaroslav Rybakov. Two weeks later in Brussels he set another personal best with 2.31 m. At the 2005 World Athletics Final he improved it again to 2.35 metres.

== Personal bests ==
Outdoor

- High jump: 2.35 m – Monaco, 10 September 2005

Indoor

- High jump: 2.31 m – (Germany) Arnstadt, 3 February 2007

== Achievements ==
Year	Competition	Venue	Position	Event	Notes
Representing Cuba
2002	Ibero-American Championships	Guatemala City, Guatemala	8th	High jump	2.14 m A
2005	Central American and Caribbean Championships	Nassau, Bahamas	1st	High jump	2.26 m
2005	World Championships	Helsinki, Finland	2nd	High jump	2.29 m (PB)
2005	World Athletics Final	Monte Carlo, Monaco	1st	High jump	2.35 m (PB)
2006	World Indoor Championships	Moscow, Russia	4th	High jump	2.30 m
2007	ALBA Games	Caracas, Venezuela	1st	High jump	2.31 m
2007	Pan American Games	Rio de Janeiro, Brazil	1st	High jump	2.32 m
2007	World Championships	Osaka, Japan	5th	High jump	2.30 m
2008	World Indoor Championships	Valencia, Spain	5th	High jump	2.27 m
2008	Central American and Caribbean Championships	Cali, Colombia	1st	High jump	2.25 m
2011	ALBA Games	Barquisimeto, Venezuela	1st	High jump	2.28 m
2011	World Championships	Daegu, South Korea	28th (q)	High jump	2.21 m
2011	Pan American Games	Guadalajara, Mexico	3rd	High jump	2.26 m
2012	Olympic Games	London, United Kingdom	20th (q)	High jump	2.21 m
