= James Grayman =

Personal information
- Full name: James Theophilus Grayman
- Born: 11 October 1985 (age 40) Parham, Saint Peter
- Height: 1.88 m (6 ft 2 in)
- Weight: 80 kg (176 lb)

Sport
- Country: Antigua and Barbuda
- Sport: Athletics
- Event: High jump
Medal record
Representing Antigua and Barbuda
Pan American Games
| Bronze medal – third place | 2007 Rio de Janeiro | High jump |
- Updated on 21 June 2013

James Theophilus Grayman (born 11 October 1985) is a male high jumper from Antigua and Barbuda. He was born and raised in Parham Town by his mother Evelyn Sheppard.

His personal best jump is 2.27 metres, achieved in July 2007 in Pergine Valsugana. This is the current Antiguan and Barbudan record.

== Personal bests ==
Outdoor

- High bump: 2.27 m NR – (Italy) Pergine Valsugana, 7 July 2007

Indoor

- High jump: 2.24 m – (Belgium) Ghent, 21 February 2010

== Achievements ==
| Year | Competition | Venue | Position | Notes |
Representing Antigua and Barbuda
| 2003 | CARIFTA Games (U20) | Port of Spain, Trinidad and Tobago | 5th | 1.98 m |
| 2003 | Central American and Caribbean Championships | St. George's, Grenada | 10th | 1.95 m |
| 2003 | Pan American Junior Championships | Bridgetown, Barbados | 8th | 2.05 m |
| 2004 | Central American and Caribbean Junior Championships (U20) | Coatzacoalcos, Mexico | 6th | 2.00 m |
| 2005 | Central American and Caribbean Championships | Nassau, Bahamas | 6th | 2.15 m |
| 2006 | Commonwealth Games | Melbourne, Australia | 9th | 2.10 m |
| 2006 | NACAC Under-23 Championships | Santo Domingo, Dominican Republic | 6th | 2.11 m |
| 2006 | Central American and Caribbean Games | Cartagena, Colombia | 4th | 2.13 m |
| 2007 | Pan American Games | Rio de Janeiro, Brazil | 3rd | 2.24 m |
| 2007 | World Championships | Osaka, Japan | 38th (q) | 2.14 m |
| 2008 | Olympic Games | Beijing, China | 28th (q) | 2.20 m |
| 2009 | ALBA Games | Havana, Cuba | 3rd | 2.10 m |
| 2009 | Central American and Caribbean Championships | Havana, Cuba | 1st | 2.19 m |
| 2010 | Central American and Caribbean Games | Mayagüez, Puerto Rico | 7th | 2.10 m |
| 2010 | Commonwealth Games | Delhi, India | 12th | 2.15 m |
| 2011 | Central American and Caribbean Championships | Mayagüez, Puerto Rico | 2nd | 2.25 m |
| 2011 | Pan American Games | Guadalajara, Mexico | 4th | 2.24 m |
