= Ioannis Constantinou =

Cypriot high jumper (born 1978)

Ioannis Constantinou (Greek: Ιωάννης Κωνσταντίνου, born 23 March 1978) is a retired Cypriot high jumper.

He finished eleventh at the 2001 Mediterranean Games, won a bronze medal at the 2003 Summer Universiade, a silver medal at the 2005 Mediterranean Games and finished tenth at the 2006 Commonwealth Games. He also competed at the 2002 Commonwealth Games without reaching the final.

His personal best is 2.24 metres, achieved in May 2004 in Sparta.
