= Kane Brigg =

Australian athlete

Kane Brigg (born 14 January 1988) is a retired Australian high jumper and triple jumper.

He finished sixth at the 2005 World Youth Championships and eleventh at the 2006 World Junior Championships. He also competed at the 2006 Commonwealth Games without reaching the final. In 2006 he was the youngest male athlete on the Australian athletics team at the Melbourne Commonwealth Games.

His personal best is 2.24 metres, first achieved in June 2007 in Gold Coast. He later switched to horizontal jumps. In March 2011 he recorded 16.97 metres in Perth and 7.45 metres in Melbourne.
