= Sergio Mestre (high jumper) =

Cuban high jumper

Personal information
- Born: 30 August 1991 (age 34)

Sport
- Sport: Track and field
- Event: High jump
Medal record
Representing Cuba
Central American and Caribbean Games
Gold medal – first place	2014 Veracruz	High jump

Sergio Mestre (born 30 August 1991) is a Cuban male track and field athlete who competes in the high jump. He was the gold medallist in the event at the 2014 Central American and Caribbean Games. He has also been a finalist at the 2015 Pan American Games and the 2015 NACAC Championships in Athletics.

== International competitions ==
Year	Competition	Venue	Position	Event	Notes
2014	CAC Games	Xalapa, Mexico	1st	High jump	2.26 m
2015	NACAC Championships	San José, Costa Rica	7th	High jump	2.15 m
2015	Pan American Games	Toronto, Canada	11th	High jump	2.15 m

== National titles ==
- Cuban Athletics Championships
  - High jump: 2012, 2015
