= 2016 IAAF World Indoor Championships – Men's high jump =

2016 IAAF world Indoor Championship- men's high jump

Men's high jump at the 2016 IAAF World Indoor Championships
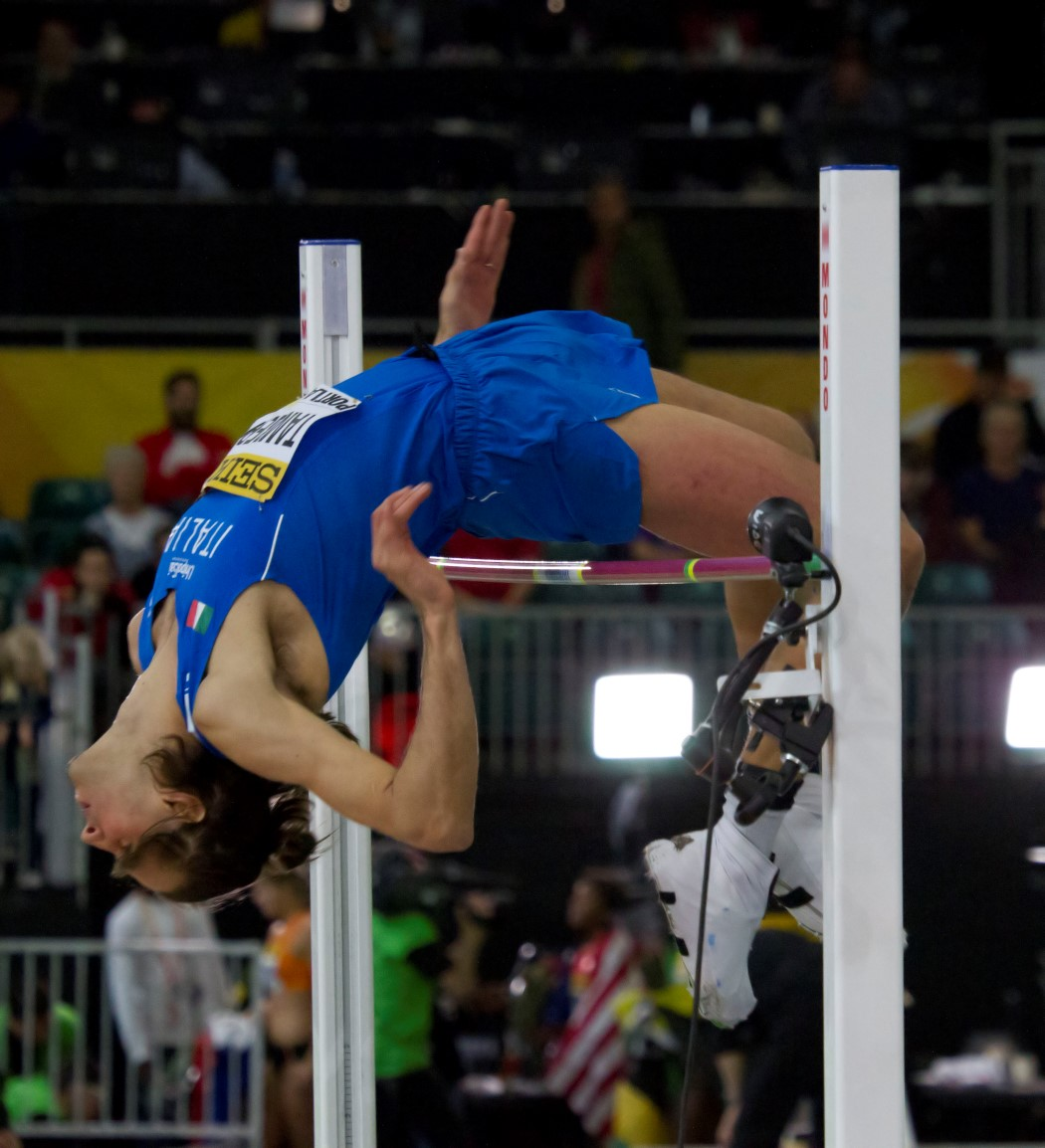
- The winning jump of Tamberi at 2.36
- Venue: Oregon Convention Center
- Dates: March 19
- Competitors: 12 from 8 nations
- Winning height: 2.36

Medalists
gold medal	Gianmarco Tamberi	Italy
silver medal	Robert Grabarz	Great Britain
bronze medal	Erik Kynard	United States

The men's high jump at the 2016 IAAF World Indoor Championships took place on March 19, 2016.

With eight over 2.29, the medals were settled by clearing 2.33, but not in order. Robert Grabarz was the first over. Erik Kynard had a perfect round going until missing his first attempt. He cleared it on his second. Gianmarco Tamberi made it on his third attempt. Defending champion Mutaz Essa Barshim, also was perfect before 2.33, but after two misses, passed to make one big attempt at 2.36. Barshim failed, but Tamberi cleared it on his first attempt. Even though he had five misses, more than anyone else in the competition, Tamberi leaped from third to first.

== Results ==
The final was started at 18:22.

Rank	Name	Nationality	2.20	2.25	2.29	2.33	2.36	2.40	Result	Notes
1st place, gold medalist(s)	Gianmarco Tamberi	Italy	xo	o	xxo	xxo	o	xxx	2.36	
2nd place, silver medalist(s)	Robert Grabarz	Great Britain	xo	o	xo	o	xxx		2.33	SB
3rd place, bronze medalist(s)	Erik Kynard	United States	o	o	o	xo	xxx		2.33	SB
4	Mutaz Essa Barshim	Qatar	o	o	o	xx–	x		2.29	
5	Konstadinos Baniotis	Greece	o	o	xo	xxx			2.29	
6	Zhang Guowei	China	o	xo	xo	xxx			2.29	
7	Andriy Protsenko	Ukraine	o	xxo	xo	xxx			2.29	
8	Chris Baker	Great Britain	xo	o	xxo	xxx			2.29	
9	Marco Fassinotti	Italy	xo	xo	xxx				2.25	
10	Donald Thomas	Bahamas	o	xxo	xxx				2.25	
11	Jamal Wilson	Bahamas	o	xxx					2.20	
12	Ricky Robertson	United States	xxo	xxx					2.20	SB
