= Saúl Ordóñez =

Spanish middle-distance runner

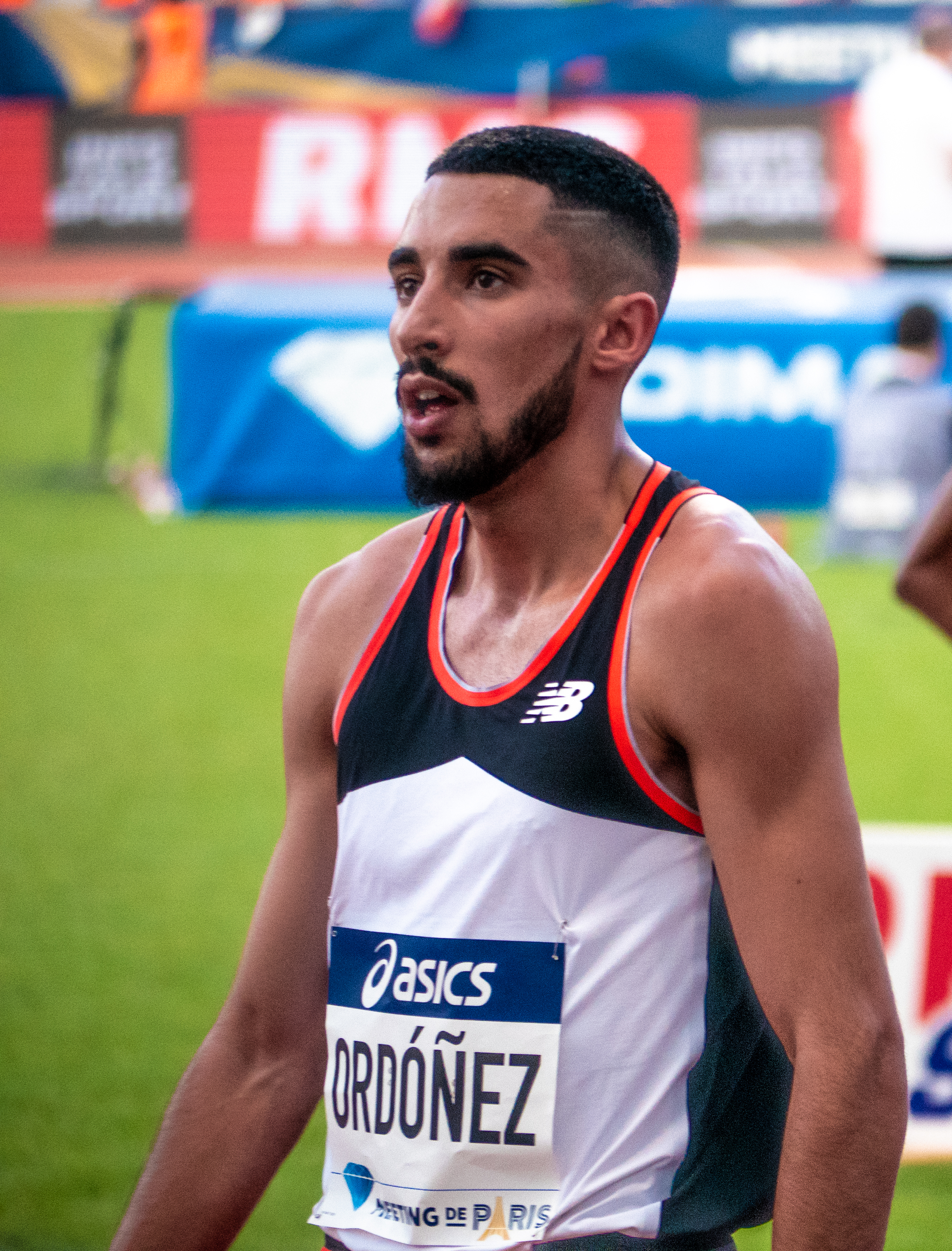
- Ordóñez in 2018

Personal information
- Full name: Saúl Ordóñez Gavela
- Nationality: Spanish
- Born: 10 April 1994 (age 32) Ponferrada, Spain
- Height: 1.78 m (5 ft 10 in)
- Weight: 63 kg (139 lb)

Sport
- Sport: Athletics
- Event: 800 metres
- Club: At. Salamanca (2012–2015); New Balance Team (2016–)
- Coached by: Uriel Reguero
Medal record
World Indoor Championships
Bronze medal – third place	2018 Birmingham	800 m

Saúl Ordóñez Gavela (born 10 April 1994) is a Spanish middle-distance runner specialising in the 800 metres. He won a bronze medal at the 2018 World Indoor Championships. Earlier he won a silver at the 2015 European U23 Championships. He holds the Spanish national record in the distance with 1:43.65.

== International competitions ==
Year	Competition	Venue	Position	Event	Notes
Representing Spain
2013	European Junior Championships	Rieti, Italy	24th (h)	1500 m	3:56.14
2015	European U23 Championships	Tallinn, Estonia	2nd	800 m	1:48.23
2016	Mediterranean U23 Championships	Tunis, Tunisia	3rd	800 m	1:48.12
2016	Mediterranean U23 Championships	Tunis, Tunisia	2nd	4 × 400 m relay	3:13.73
2018	World Indoor Championships	Birmingham, United Kingdom	3rd	800 m	1:48.01
2018	European Championships	Berlin, Germany	10th (sf)	800 m	1:46.82
2018	European Cross Country Championships	Tilburg, Netherlands	1st	4 x 1,5 km mixed relay	16:10
2019	European Indoor Championships	Glasgow, United Kingdom	-	1500 m	DNF
2021	Olympic Games	Tokyo, Japan	22nd (h)	800 m	1:45.98
2022	World Indoor Championships	Belgrade, Serbia	18th (h)	1500 m	3:43.67
2023	European Indoor Championships	Istanbul, Turkey	26th (h)	800 m	1:51.72
2023	World Championships	Budapest, Hungary	16th (sf)	800 m	1:44.74

== Personal bests ==
Outdoor

- 400 metres – 48.74 (Palencia 2015)
- 800 metres – 1:43.65 NR (Monaco 2018)
- 1500 metres – 3:34.98 (Castellón 2020)
- 3000 metres – 8:30.48 (Valladolid 2013)

Indoor

- 800 metres – 1:45.88 (Madrid 2023)
- 1500 metres – 3:37.99 (Liévin 2022)
- Mile – 3:55.27 (New York 2022)
- 3000 metres – 8:07.37 (Antequera 2015)
