= Julio Luciano =

Dominican Republic high jumper

Personal information
- Born: 10 October 1977 (age 48) Santo Domingo, Dominican Republic

Sport
- Sport: Track and field
Medal record
Representing the Dominican Republic
NACAC Championships
Bronze medal – third place	2007 San Salvador	High jump
Central American and Caribbean Games
Bronze medal – third place	1998 Maracaibo	High jump

Julio Luciano Ovedo (born 10 October 1977) is a retired Dominican Republic high jumper.

He won the silver medal at the 1997 Central American and Caribbean Championships, the bronze medal at the 1998 Central American and Caribbean Games, and the gold medal at the 1999 Central American and Caribbean Championships. He also competed at the 1996 Olympic Games and the 1997 World Championships without reaching the final.

Luciano's personal best jump is 2.24 metres, achieved in Santo Domingo in June 1996.

== Competition record ==
Year	Competition	Venue	Position	Notes
Representing Dominican Republic
1995	Pan American Junior Championships	Santiago, Chile	8th	2.10 m
1996	Ibero-American Championships	Medellín, Colombia	3rd	2.10 m
1996	Olympic Games	Atlanta, United States	25th (q)	2.20 m
1997	Central American and Caribbean Championships	San Juan, Puerto Rico	2nd	2.15 m
1997	World Championships	Athens, Greece	32nd (q)	2.15 m
1998	Central American and Caribbean Games	Maracaibo, Venezuela	3rd	2.21 m
1999	Central American and Caribbean Championships	Bridgetown, Barbados	1st	2.23 m
1999	Pan American Games	Winnipeg, Canada	9th	2.15 m
2002	Ibero-American Championships	Guatemala City, Guatemala	6th	2.20 m
2006	Central American and Caribbean Games	Cartagena, Colombia	4th	2.13 m
2007	NACAC Championships	San Salvador, El Salvador	3rd	2.17 m
2007	Pan American Games	Rio de Janeiro, Brazil	–	NM
