= Ricky Robertson =

American high jumper (born 1990)

Personal information
- Nationality: American
- Born: September 19, 1990 (age 35) Hernando, Mississippi
- Agent: Mark Pryor World Express Sports Mgmt
- Height: 5 ft 11 in (180 cm)
- Weight: 188 lb (85 kg)

Sport
- Country: United States
- Sport: Track and field
- Event: High jump
- College team: Ole Miss Rebels
- Turned pro: 2013
- Coached by: Jeremy Fischer

Achievements and titles
- Olympic finals: 2016
Medal record
NACAC Under-23 Championships
Silver medal – second place	2010 Miramar	High jump

Ricky Robertson (born September 19, 1990, in Hernando, Mississippi) is an American track and field athlete who competes in the high jump. Ricky made his Olympic debut at the 2016 Summer Olympics placed 17th clearing a bar 2.26 m (7 ft 4 3/4 in), and placed 16th clearing 2.29 m (7 ft 6 in) at 2017 World Championships in Athletics – Men's high jump. Ricky Robertson earned 10 NCAA Division I All-American awards and 14 Southeastern Conference all conference awards as an Ole Miss Rebel.

== Professional ==
Ricky made Team USA at 2016 U.S. Olympic Trials (track and field) in the high jump clearing 2.25 m (7 ft 4 1/2 in). Ricky made his Olympic debut at the 2016 Summer Olympics after clearing the Olympic standard 2.29 m (7 ft 6 in) at Chula Vista Olympic Training Center in June 2016.

Ricky made Team USA after clearing the World Indoor standard and placing fourth at 2016 USA Indoor Track and Field Championships in the high jump clearing 2.18 m (7 ft 1 3/4 in). At 2016 IAAF World Indoor Championships – Men's high jump, he placed twelfth in the high jump clearing 2.20 m (7 ft 2 1/2 in).

Ricky jumped a season best at 2015 USA Outdoor Track and Field Championships in the high jump clearing 2.25 m (7 ft 4 1/2 in) finished 7th.

Ricky finished 8th at 2014 USA Outdoor Track and Field Championships in the high jump clearing 2.25 m (7 ft 4 1/2 in).

Ricky finished 15th at 2012 U.S. Olympic Trials (track and field) in the high jump clearing 2.15 m (7 ft 1/2 in).

US National Championship	Event	Venue	Place	Height
2018 USA Outdoor Track and Field Championships	High Jump	Des Moines, Iowa	4th	2.28 m (7 ft 5 3/4 in)
2018 USA Indoor Track and Field Championships	High Jump	Albuquerque, New Mexico	3rd	2.24 m (7 ft 4 in)
2017 USA Outdoor Track and Field Championships	High Jump	Sacramento, California	2nd	2.30 m (7 ft 6 1/2 in)
2016 United States Olympic Trials (track and field)	High Jump	Eugene, Oregon	6th	2.21 m (7 ft 3 in)
2016 USA Indoor Track and Field Championships	High Jump	Portland, Oregon	4th	2.18 m (7 ft 1 3/4 in)
2015 USA Outdoor Track and Field Championships	High Jump	Eugene, Oregon	7th	2.25 m (7 ft 4 1/2 in)
2015 USA Indoor Track and Field Championships	High Jump	Portland, Oregon	2nd	2.31 m (7 ft 6 3/4 in)
2014 USA Outdoor Track and Field Championships	High Jump	Sacramento, California	8th	2.15 m (7 ft 1/2 in)
2012 United States Olympic Trials (track and field)	High Jump	Eugene, Oregon	15th	2.15 m (7 ft 1/2 in)

== NCAA ==
Ricky graduated from University of Mississippi. Ricky improved at Ole Miss in
2010 2.28 m (7 ft 5 3/4 in)
2011 2.29 m (7 ft 6 in)
2012 2.32 m (7 ft 7 1/4 in)
2013 2.29 m (7 ft 6 in)

Ricky Robertson high jumped a world leader in April 2012 at Florida Relays.

Ricky Robertson earned all American honors bestowed by USTFCCCA in

- 2 times in 2013,
- 4 times in 2012,
- 2 times in 2011,
- 2 times in 2010.

Ricky Robertson earned all Southeastern Conference honors 15 times:

- High jump (8 times),
- Triple jump (4 times),
- Long jump (3 times).

At the 2010 NACAC Under-23 Championships in Athletics, Ricky placed second in the high jump clearing 2.23 m (7 ft 3 3/4 in).

== Prep ==
Ricky Robertson was the 2008 High school #1 rated high jumper at 2.21 m (7 ft 3 in) and 2009 High school #1 rated high jumper at 2.18 m (7 ft 1 3/4 in). Ricky graduated from Hernando High School (Mississippi).
