= Bryan McBride =

American high jumper

Personal information
- Born: December 10, 1991 (age 34) Long Beach, California, U.S.
- Height: 5 ft 11 in (180 cm)
- Weight: 188 lb (85 kg)

Sport
- Country: United States
- Sport: Track and field
- Event: High jump
- College team: Arizona State Sun Devils
- Turned pro: 2015

Achievements and titles
- World finals: 2017
Medal record
IAAF World Championships in Athletics
2017 London	High jump

Bryan McBride (born December 10, 1991, in Long Beach, California) is an American track and field athlete who competes primarily in the high jump. McBride has coached long Jump, triple Jump and high Jump at Cuyamaca College since 2016. McBride is the 2017 National Champion, tying his personal best of 2.30 m (7 ft 6 1/2 in). His exuberant celebration, running halfway down the football field in Hornet Stadium after the winning jump was captured on NBC's television coverage. He was also runner-up at the 2016 Indoor Championships.

== Professional ==
Bryan McBride placed 8th after clearing 2.25 m (7 ft 4 1/2 in) at 2017 World Championships in Athletics – Men's high jump.

US National Championship	Event	Venue	Place	Height
2018 USA Outdoor Track and Field Championships	High Jump	Des Moines, Iowa	9th	2.17 m (7 ft 1 1/4 in)
2017 USA Outdoor Track and Field Championships	High Jump	Sacramento, California	1st	2.30 m (7 ft 6 1/2 in)
2016 United States Olympic Trials (track and field)	High Jump	Eugene, Oregon	8th	2.16 m (7 ft 1 in)
2016 USA Indoor Track and Field Championships	High Jump	Portland, Oregon	2nd	2.26 m (7 ft 4 3/4 in)
2015 USA Outdoor Track and Field Championships	High Jump	Eugene, Oregon	12th	2.15 m (7 ft 1/2 in)
2014 USA Outdoor Track and Field Championships	High Jump	Sacramento, California	4th	2.28 m (7 ft 5 3/4 in)
2012 United States Olympic Trials (track and field)	High Jump	Eugene, Oregon	17th	2.10 m (6 ft 10 1/2 in)
2010 USA Junior Outdoor Track and Field Championships	High Jump	Des Moines, Iowa	9th	2.06 m (6 ft 9 in)

== Arizona State University ==
McBride is the 2014 NCAA Outdoor High Jump Champion, earned 8 NCAA Division I All America honors, 2015 Pac-12 High Jump Champion, 2015 MPSF High Jump Champion, and 2015 MPSF Long Jump Champion.

McBride had previously jumped 2.30 while competing for Arizona State, breaking the 38-year-old school record of Kyle Arney from 1977. He became the 2014 NCAA Champion.

He lost the 2013 season to a stress fracture of his left ankle. He is also a credible long jumper, having jumped 7.79 m (25 ft 6 1/2 in), indoors in Seattle while at Arizona State.

Representing Arizona State University
Year	MPSF Indoor	NCAA Indoor	Pac 12 Outdoor	NCAA Outdoor
2015	High Jump 1st 2.26 m (7 ft 4 3/4 in); Long Jump 1st 7.79 m (25 ft 6 1/2 in); Triple Jump 4th 15.38 m (50 ft 5 1/2 in)	Long Jump 8th 7.59 m (24 ft 10 3/4 in); High Jump 15th 2.15 m (7 ft 1/2 in)	High Jump 1st 2.19 m (7 ft 2 in); Long Jump 4th 7.64 m (25 ft 3/4 in); Triple Jump 4th 15.66 m (51 ft 4 1/2 in)	Long Jump 16th 7.51 m (24 ft 7 1/2 in); High Jump 6th 2.19 m (7 ft 2 in)
2014	High Jump 2nd 2.21 m (7 ft 3 in); Long Jump 6th 7.35 m (24 ft 1 1/4 in)	High Jump 9th 2.23 m (7 ft 3 3/4 in)	High Jump 2nd 2.22 m (7 ft 3 1/4 in); Long Jump 9th 7.35 m (24 ft 1 1/4 in)	High Jump 1st 2.28 m (7 ft 5 3/4 in)
2013				
2012	High Jump 4th 2.17 m (7 ft 1 1/4 in); Long Jump 6th 7.21 m (23 ft 7 3/4 in); Triple Jump 8th 14.87 m (48 ft 9 1/4 in)	High Jump 6th 2.20 m (7 ft 2 1/2 in)	High Jump 4th 2.17 m (7 ft 1 1/4 in); Long Jump 8th 7.35 m (24 ft 1 1/4 in); Triple Jump 14th 14.55 m (47 ft 8 3/4 in)	High Jump 12th 2.20 m (7 ft 2 1/2 in)
2011	High Jump 7th 2.09 m (6 ft 10 1/4 in)		High Jump 3rd 2.17 m (7 ft 1 1/4 in); Long Jump 11th 7.17 m (23 ft 6 1/4 in); Triple Jump 14th 14.40 m (47 ft 2 3/4 in)	

== Prep ==
Prior to Arizona State, Bryan McBride attended Sandra Day O'Connor High School, where he was a 2.14 m (7 ft 1/4 in) high jumper.

McBride won 2010 Arizona Interscholastic Association High Jump 5A Division 2 state title after clearing 2.085 m (6 ft 10 in) and 2009 AIA 4A Division 1 state title clearing 2.035 m (6 ft 8 in) at Mesa Community College.

McBride grew up in Peoria, Arizona, as an Outfielder.
