= Athletics at the 2011 Pan American Games – Men's high jump =

Men's high jump at the 2011 Pan American Games
- Venue: Telmex Athletics Stadium
- Dates: October 27
- Competitors: 19 from 17 nations

Medalists
Gold medal	Donald Thomas	Bahamas
Silver medal	Diego Ferrin	Ecuador
Bronze medal	Víctor Moya	Cuba

The men's high jump event of the athletics events at the 2011 Pan American Games was held the 27 of October at the Telmex Athletics Stadium. The defending Pan American Games champion is Víctor Moya of the Cuba.

== Records ==
Prior to this competition, the existing world and Pan American Games records were as follows:

World record	Javier Sotomayor (CUB)	2.45	Salamanca, Spain	July 27, 1993
Pan American Games record	Javier Sotomayor (CUB)	2.40	Mar del Plata, Argentine	March 25, 1995

== Qualification ==
Each National Olympic Committee (NOC) was able to enter up to two entrants providing they had met the minimum standard (2.13) in the qualifying period (January 1, 2010 to September 14, 2011).

== Schedule ==
Date	Time	Round
October 27, 2011	16:55	Final

== Results ==
All distances shown are in meters:centimeters

KEY:	q	Fastest non-qualifiers	Q	Qualified	NR	National record	PB	Personal best	SB	Seasonal best

=== Final ===
The final was held on October 27.

Rank	Athlete	Nationality	1.90	1.95	2.00	2.05	2.10	2.15	2.18	2.21	2.24	2.26	2.28	2.30	2.32	2.34	Result	Notes
1st place, gold medalist(s)	Donald Thomas	Bahamas	–	–	–	–	–	–	xxo	o	xo	o	xo	xo	xo	xxx	2.32	
2nd place, silver medalist(s)	Diego Ferrin	Ecuador	–	–	–	–	xxo	o	o	xxo	o	xo	o	o	xx–	x	2.30	PB
3rd place, bronze medalist(s)	Víctor Moya	Cuba	–	–	–	–	–	o	–	o	xx–	o	x–	xx			2.26	
4	James Grayman	Antigua and Barbuda	–	–	–	–	o	o	o	xxo	o	xx–	x				2.24	
5	Brendan Williams	Dominica	–	–	–	xo	o	o	o	o	xxx						2.21	PB
6	Jamie Nieto	United States	–	–	–	–	o	o	o	xo	xxx						2.21	
7	Jim Dilling	United States	–	–	–	–	o	o	xxo	xo	xxx						2.21	
8	Edgar Rivera	Mexico	–	–	–	o	o	o	o	xxx							2.18	
9	Wagner Miller	Colombia	–	–	–	–	xxo	o	o	xxx							2.18	
10	Carlos Layoy	Argentina	–	–	–	–	o	xo	xxo	xxx							2.18	
11	Thorrold Murray	Barbados	–	–	–	o	o	xxx									2.10	
12	Arturo Chávez	Peru	–	–	xo	o	xo	xxx									2.10	
13	Rafael dos Santos	Brazil	–	–	–	o	xxo	xxx									2.10	
14	Marlon Colorado	El Salvador	o	o	xxo	o	xxo	xxx									2.10	
15	Keron Stoute	British Virgin Islands	o	xo	xo	o	xxx										2.05	
16	Josue Louis	Haiti	–	o	o	xxx											2.00	
17	Henry Linton Quesada	Costa Rica	xo	xo	xxx												1.95	
	Jorge Rouco	Mexico	–	–	–	–	xxx										NM	
	Linford Avila	Belize															DNS	
