= 2014 IAAF World Indoor Championships – Men's high jump =

The men's High Jump at the 2014 IAAF World Indoor Championships took place on 8–9 March 2014.

== Medalists ==
Gold	Silver	Bronze
Mutaz Essa Barshim; Qatar	Andriy Protsenko; Ukraine	Erik Kynard; United States

== Records ==
Standing records prior to the 2014 IAAF World Indoor Championships
World record	Javier Sotomayor (CUB)	2.43	Budapest, Hungary	4 March 1989
Championship record	Javier Sotomayor (CUB)	2.43	Budapest, Hungary	4 March 1989
World Leading	Ivan Ukhov (RUS)	2.42	Prague, Czech Republic	25 February 2014
African record	Anthony Idiata (NGR)	2.32	Patras, Greece	15 February 2000
Asian record	Mutaz Essa Barshim (QAT)	2.37	Hangzhou, China	19 February 2012
Asian record	Mutaz Essa Barshim (QAT)	2.37	Moscow, Russia	3 February 2013
European record	Carlo Thränhardt (FRG)	2.42	Berlin, Germany	26 February 1988
European record	Ivan Ukhov (RUS)	2.42	Prague, Czech Republic	25 February 2014
North and Central American and Caribbean record	Javier Sotomayor (CUB)	2.43	Budapest, Hungary	4 March 1989
Oceanian Record	Tim Forsyth (AUS)	2.33	Balingen, Germany	16 February 1997
South American record	Gilmar Mayo (COL)	2.27	Piraeus, Greece	24 February 1999
Records broken during the 2014 IAAF World Indoor Championships
Asian record	Mutaz Essa Barshim (QAT)	2.38	Sopot, Poland	9 March 2014

== Qualification standards ==
Indoor	Outdoor
2.30

== Schedule ==
Date	Time	Round
March 8, 2014	12:05	Qualification
March 9, 2014	16:30	Final

== Results ==
=== Qualification ===
Qualification: 2.31 (Q) or at least 8 best performers (q) qualified for the final.

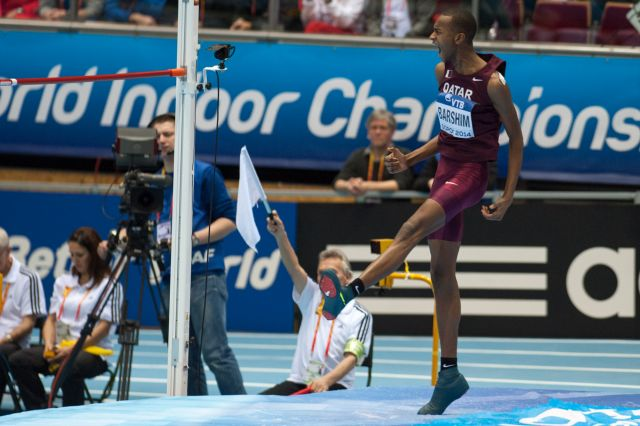
Gold medalist, Mutaz Essa Barshim

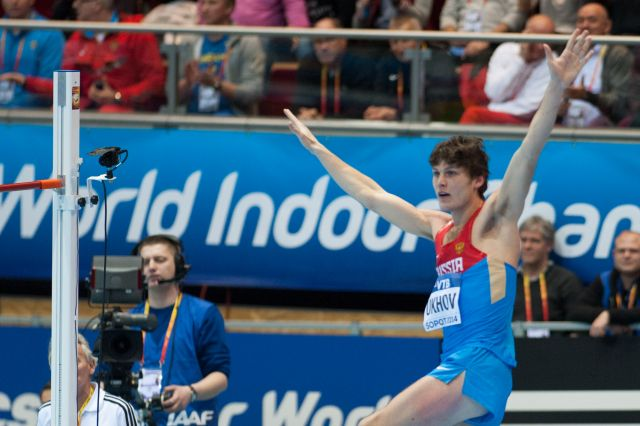
Ivan Ukhov finished second in the final.

Rank	Name	Nationality	2.16	2.21	2.25	2.28	Result	Notes
1	Andriy Protsenko	Ukraine	o	o	o	o	2.28	q
1	Daniil Tsyplakov	Russia	o	o	o	o	2.28	q
3	Michael Mason	Canada	o	o	xo	o	2.28	q
3	Mutaz Essa Barshim	Qatar	xo	o	o	o	2.28	q
5	Zhang Guowei	China	o	o	o	xo	2.28	q, SB
6	Erik Kynard	United States	o	xo	o	xo	2.28	q
7	Marco Fassinotti	Italy	o	o	o	xxx	2.25	q
7	Ivan Ukhov	Russia	o	–	o	–	2.25	q
9	Mihai Donisan	Romania	o	xo	o	xxx	2.25	
10	Wang Yu	China	o	o	xo	xxx	2.25	SB
11	Robert Grabarz	Great Britain	xo	xo	xo	xxx	2.25	
12	Tom Parsons	Great Britain	o	o	xxo	xxx	2.25	
13	Dusty Jonas	United States	o	o	xxx		2.21	
13	Ali Mohd Younes Idris	Sudan	o	o	xxx		2.21	
15	Ryan Ingraham	Bahamas	o	xxo	xxx		2.21	
	Donald Thomas	Bahamas	xxx				NM	
	Arturo Chávez	Peru	xxx				NM	

=== Final ===
Rank	Name	Nationality	2.20	2.25	2.29	2.32	2.34	2.36	2.38	2.40	Result	Notes
1st place, gold medalist(s)	Mutaz Essa Barshim	Qatar	o	o	o	o	o	o	o	xxx	2.38	AR
2nd place, silver medalist(s)	Andriy Protsenko	Ukraine	o	o	o	xxo	x–	o	xxx		2.36	PB
3rd place, bronze medalist(s)	Erik Kynard	United States	o	o	o	xo	o	x–	xx		2.34	SB
4	Daniil Tsyplakov	Russia	o	o	o	xo	x–	xx			2.32	
5	Marco Fassinotti	Italy	o	o	o	xxx					2.29	
6	Zhang Guowei	China	xo	xxo	xo	xxx					2.29	SB
7	Michael Mason	Canada	o	o	xxx						2.25	
	Ivan Ukhov	Russia	o	–	o	–	o	–	xxo	xxx	2.38	DQ
