= Athletics at the 2014 Summer Youth Olympics – Boys' high jump =

Athletics – Boys' high jump at the II Summer Youth Olympic Games
- Venue: Nanjing Olympic Sports Centre
- Date: August 20–23
- Competitors: 15 from 15 nations

Medalists
1st place, gold medalist(s)		Danil Lysenko	Russia
2nd place, silver medalist(s)		Yuji Hiramatsu	Japan
3rd place, bronze medalist(s)		Shemaiah James	Australia

The boys’ high jump competition at the 2014 Summer Youth Olympics was held on 20–23 August 2014 in Nanjing Olympic Sports Center.

== Schedule ==
Date	Time	Round
20 August 2014	18:40	Qualification
23 August 2014	20:10	Final

== Results ==
=== Qualification ===
The top 8 jumpers qualified to the Final A, while the other jumpers competed in the Final B.

Rank	Athlete	1.90	1.95	1.99	2.03	2.07	2.10	Result	Notes	Q
1	Danil Lysenko (RUS)	o	o	o	o	o	o	2.10		FA
2	Oleksandr Barannikov (UKR)	o	o	o	o	xxo	o	2.10		FA
3	Jah-Nhai Perinchief (BER)	-	o	o	xo	xxo	o	2.10	PB	FA
4	Yuji Hiramatsu (JPN)	-	-	o	o	o	xo	2.10		FA
5	Igor Kopala (POL)	o	o	o	xo	o	xxo	2.10		FA
6	Lusahane Wilson (JAM)	-	o	o	o	o	xxx	2.07	PB	FA
7	Hichem Bouhanoun (ALG)	o	o	o	o	xo	xxx	2.07		FA
7	Shemaiah James (AUS)	-	o	o	o	xo	xxx	2.07		FA
9	Alperen Acet (TUR)	o	o	o	o	xxo	xxx	2.07		FB
10	Jaime Escobar (PAN)	o	o	-	xo	xxx		2.03	SB	FB
10	Aryan Zakerani (IRI)	o	o	o	xo	xxx		2.03		FB
12	Norshafie Mohd Shah (MAS)	o	o	xo	xxo	xxx		2.03		FB
13	Stefano Sottile (ITA)	o	o	xxo	xxo	xxx		2.03		FB
14	Chen Yen-Hung (TPE)	-	xo	o	xxx			1.99		FB
15	Danilo Cardoso (BRA)	o	o	xxx				1.95		FB

=== Finals ===
==== Final A ====
Rank	Final Placing	Athlete	2.00	2.04	2.08	2.11	2.14	2.16	2.20	2.25	Result	Notes
1st place, gold medalist(s)	1	Danil Lysenko (RUS)	o	o	o	o	o	xo	o	xxx	2.20	
2nd place, silver medalist(s)	2	Yuji Hiramatsu (JPN)	o	o	o	o	o	xxx			2.14	PB
3rd place, bronze medalist(s)	3	Shemaiah James (AUS)	o	o	xo	o	o	xxx			2.14	PB
4	4	Oleksandr Barannikov (UKR)	o	o	o	xxo	xo	xxx			2.14	
5	5	Lusahane Wilson (JAM)	o	o	o	xxx					2.08	PB
6	6	Igor Kopala (POL)	o	o	xxo	-	x-	xx			2.08	
7	7	Hichem Bouhanoun (ALG)	xxo	o	xxo	xxx					2.08	
8	8	Jah-Nhai Perinchief (BER)	o	xxx							2.00	

==== Final B ====
Rank	Final Placing	Athlete	1.94	1.98	2.02	2.05	2.08	Result	Notes
1	9	Jaime Escobar (PAN)	o	o	o	o	xxx	2.05	SB
2	10	Danilo Cardoso (BRA)	o	o	xxo	xo	xxx	2.05	PB
3	11	Aryan Zakerani (IRI)	xo	o	o	xxo	xxx	2.05	
4	12	Chen Yen-Hung (TPE)	xo	xo	o	xxx		2.02	
5	13	Norshafie Mohd Shah (MAS)	o	xxo	xxo	xxx		2.02	
6	14	Stefano Sottile (ITA)	xo	xxo	xxo	xxx		2.02	
		Alperen Acet (TUR)						DNS	
