= Drew Windle =

American middle-distance runner

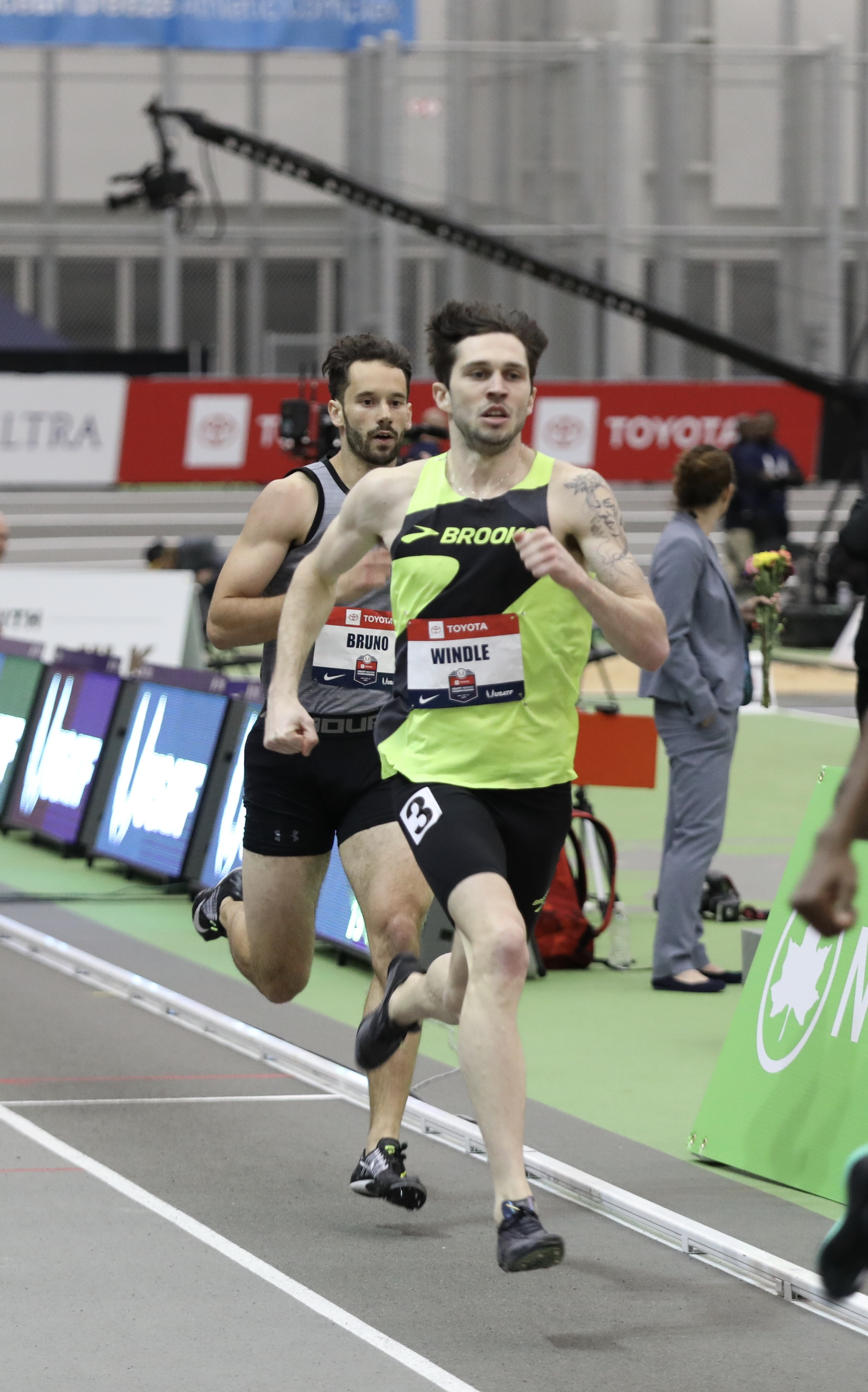
- Windle in 2019

Personal information
- Born: July 22, 1992 (age 33) New Albany, Ohio, U.S.
- Education: Ashland University

Sport
- Sport: Track and field
- Event: 800 metres
- College team: Ashland Eagles
- Club: Brooks Beast Track Club

Achievements and titles
- Personal best: 800 m – 1:44.63 (2017)
Medal record
Men's athletics
Representing the United States
World Indoor Championships
Silver medal – second place	2018 Birmingham	800 m

Drew Windle (born July 22, 1992) is an American middle-distance runner. He competed in the Men's 800 metres at the 2017 World Championships in Athletics.

He won his first global medal – an 800 m silver – as the quickest athlete over the last 200 m, moving from sixth to second place.

He grew up in New Albany, Ohio and attended New Albany High School before moving to Ashland University.

In 2023, Windle became the assistant cross country and distance coach for the Ohio Bobcats track and field team.

== International competitions ==
Year	Competition	Venue	Position	Event	Notes
Representing the United States
2014	NACAC U23 Championships	Kamloops, Canada	5th	800 m	1:51.62
2017	World Championships	London, United Kingdom	14th (sf)	800 m	1:46.33
2018	World Indoor Championships	Birmingham, United Kingdom	2nd	800 m	1:47.99
