= Erik Kynard =

American high jumper (born 1991)

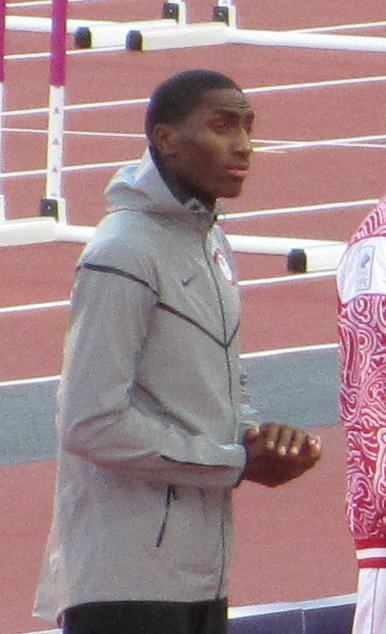
- Erik Kynard, London 2012

Personal information
- Born: February 3, 1991 (age 35) Toledo, Ohio, U.S.
- Height: 6 ft 4 in (193 cm)
- Weight: 188 lb (85 kg)

Sport
- Country: United States
- Sport: Track and field
- Event: High jump
- College team: Kansas State University
- Turned pro: 2013
- Coached by: Cliff Rovelto
- Retired: 2021
Medal record
Men's athletics
Representing the United States
Olympic Games
Gold medal – first place	2012 London	High jump
World Indoor Championships
Bronze medal – third place	2014 Sopot	High jump
Bronze medal – third place	2016 Portland	High jump

Erik Kynard Jr. (born February 3, 1991) is an American track and field athlete who competes in the high jump. In his Olympic debut at the 2012 Summer Olympics in London as a 21-year-old, he won a silver medal in the men's high jump. His silver medal was upgraded to gold in 2021 upon the disqualification of original champion Ivan Ukhov from Russia for doping.

Kynard was born in 1991, the son of Erik Kynard and Brandynn Adams. He is one of 10 children. He is a 2009 graduate of Rogers High School in Toledo, Ohio, and a graduate of Kansas State University where he trained under Cliff Rovelto. He jumps off his right leg.

At 17 years old, Kynard qualified for the U.S. Olympic Team Trials in 2008 but did not make the team. Kynard was the 2011 and 2012 NCAA outdoor national champion in the high jump.

At the 2012 United States Olympic trials, Kynard made the Olympic team by placing second behind Jamie Nieto with a height of 2.28 m. At the Olympics, Kynard won silver behind Russian Ivan Ukhov with a height of 2.33 m, the first major international medal of his career. Ukhov won the competition with a height of 2.38 m. Throughout the high jump competition, Kynard was notable for his American-themed tube socks.

In February 2019, it was announced that all of Ivan Ukhov's results from 16 July 2012 to 31 December 2015 were being disqualified for doping, making Eric Kynard the rightful recipient of the 2012 gold medal.

At the start of the 2013 outdoor season, he cleared a world-leading mark of 2.34 m at the Mt SAC Relays. He won the high jump title at the United States Outdoor National Championships in 2014 and 2015; in the latter he tied his personal best, and the meet record, of 2.37m (7' 9-1/4").

In January 2022, while unofficially retired, Kynard accepted a six-month ban from the U.S. Anti-Doping Agency for receiving an IV infusion of saline solution with no prohibited substances without a therapeutic use exemption.

On August 9, 2024, Kynard received his upgraded gold medal from the 2012 London Summer Olympics in a medal reallocation ceremony held at the Champions Park of the 2024 Paris Summer Olympics. When asked by a reporter if the day had made him feel “whole", he responded:

“I would not sum it up as making me whole for what I lost...It's like I told a joke 12 years ago, and the world just now is starting to get it.”

== Major competition record ==
Year	Competition	Venue	Position	Event	Notes
Representing the United States
2008	World Junior Championships	Bydgoszcz, Poland	19th (q)	High jump	2.10 m
2009	Pan American Junior Championships	Port of Spain, Trinidad and Tobago	2nd	High jump	2.10 m
2011	World Championships	Daegu, South Korea	14th (q)	High jump	2.28 m
2011	Universiade	Shenzhen, China	13th	High jump	2.15 m
2012	Olympic Games	London, United Kingdom	1st	High jump	2.33 m
2013	World Championships	Moscow, Russia	5th	High jump	2.32 m
2014	World Indoor Championships	Sopot, Poland	3rd	High jump	2.34 m
2015	World Championships	Beijing, China	8th	High jump	2.25 m
2016	World Indoor Championships	Portland, United States	3rd	High jump	2.33 m
2016	Olympic Games	Rio de Janeiro, Brazil	6th	High jump	2.33 m
2017	World Championships	London, United Kingdom	–	High jump	NM
2018	World Indoor Championships	Birmingham, United Kingdom	4th	High jump	2.29 m

== Personal bests ==
Event	Best (m)	Venue	Date
High jump (outdoor)	2.37	Lausanne, Switzerland	June 4, 2013
High jump (indoor)	2.34	Birmingham	February 15, 2014

- All information taken from IAAF profile.
