= Athletics at the 2007 Pan American Games – Men's high jump =

Men's high jump at the Pan American Games

The men's high jump event at the 2007 Pan American Games was held on July 27.

== Results ==
Rank	Athlete	Nationality	2.05	2.10	2.15	2.18	2.21	2.24	2.26	2.28	2.30	2.32	2.34	Result	Notes
1st place, gold medalist(s)	Víctor Moya	Cuba	–	–	–	o	–	–	o	–	xxo	xxo	x–	2.32	
2nd place, silver medalist(s)	Donald Thomas	Bahamas	–	–	o	xo	–	o	o	xo	xo	xxx		2.30	
3rd place, bronze medalist(s)	James Grayman	Antigua and Barbuda	–	o	o	xo	o	o	xxx					2.24	
4	Jessé de Lima	Brazil	–	–	o	–	xxo	o	xxx					2.24	
5	Gerardo Martínez	Mexico	–	o	o	o	o	xo	xxx					2.24	
6	Adam Shunk	United States	–	–	o	–	xo	xxo	xxx					2.24	
7	Trevor Barry	Bahamas	–	o	o	o	o	xxx						2.21	
7	Jamie Nieto	United States	–	–	–	o	o	–	xxx					2.21	
9	Brendan Williams	Dominica	xo	o	o	o	xxx							2.18	PB
10	Darvin Edwards	Saint Lucia	–	o	o	xo	xxx							2.18	SB
11	Fábio Baptista	Brazil	o	o	o	xxx								2.15	
11	Henderson Dottin	Barbados	o	o	o	xxx								2.15	
13	Gilmar Mayo	Colombia	–	o	xxx									2.10	
14	Deon Brangman	Bermuda	o	xx–	x									2.05	
	Julio Luciano	Dominican Republic	–	–	xxx									NM	
	Omar Wright	Cayman Islands	xxx											NM	
