= Simon Phelan =

Irish-Jèrriais high jumper and academic

Personal information
- Born: 26 February 1986 (age 40) Galway, Ireland
- Height: 1.83 m (6 ft 0 in)
- Weight: 73 kg (161 lb; 11.5 st)

Academic background
- Education: University of Bath; University of Birmingham

Academic work
- Discipline: Sports
- Institutions: University of Northampton; University of Birmingham; Oxford Brookes University
Medal record
Event / 1st / 2nd / 3rd; Island Games / 1 / 0 / 0
Representing Jersey
High jump
Island Games
Gold medal – first place	2011 Isle of Wight	High jump
- Updated on 11 September 2016

Simon Phelan (born 26 February 1986) is an Irish academic and former athlete, who is currently a lecturer at Oxford Brookes University. As an athlete, Phelan competed for Jersey as a high jumper, and won the high jump event at the 2011 Island Games.

== Sports career ==
Phelan was born in Galway, Ireland, but moved to Jersey as a child. In 2005, he won the high jump event at the South of England Championships with a height of 2.10m. Phelan represented Jersey at the 2006 Commonwealth Games in Melbourne; he finished 18th in the qualifying round of the event, with a height of 2.05. Phelan and Lauren Therin were the only Jersey athletics competitors at the Games. Phelan won the high jump event at the 2011 Island Games with a height of 2.10m, 15 cm higher than any other competitor. Whilst studying at the University of Bath, Phelan competed for TeamBath. In 2015, Phelan jumped 2.16m at an event in Bedford; in doing so, he broke his personal best by 1 cm, and also broke the Jersey national record. Phelan competed at the 2014 Commonwealth Games in Glasgow; he finished last in his qualifying pool, with a jump of 2.06m. After the event, he said that it was "probably the worst I've jumped for a year". Phelan also came fourth at the 2015 Island Games in Jersey, which was won by fellow Jersey athlete Jason Fox. Phelan retired due to an injury.

== Academic career ==
Phelan has a degree in coaching and sports development from the University of Bath, and as of 2014, he was studying for a PhD at the University of Birmingham. After retiring from high jump, Phelan decided that he didn't want to be a coach, and instead focused on research. He worked at the University of Northampton and the University of Birmingham, and since 2017, Phelan has been a lecturer at Oxford Brookes University.
