= 2017 World Championships in Athletics – Men's high jump =

Olympic Athletics event held in 2017

Men's high jump at the 2017 World Championships
- Venue: Olympic Stadium
- Dates: 11 August (qualification); 13 August (final)
- Competitors: 27 from 19 nations
- Winning height: 2.35

Medalists
gold medal	Mutaz Essa Barshim	Qatar
silver medal	Danil Lysenko	Authorised Neutral Athletes
bronze medal	Majd Eddin Ghazal	Syria

The men's high jump at the 2017 World Championships in Athletics was held at the Olympic Stadium on 11 and 13 August.

== Summary ==
After winning Olympic gold, then setting the world decathlon best in the high jump, defending champion Derek Drouin (CAN) could not return due to a nagging injury. Olympic silver medalist Mutaz Essa Barshim (BHR) was perfect through the automatic qualifier in the preliminaries and up to 2.29 m in the final. Danil Lysenko, competing as an Authorised Neutral Athlete and Majd Eddin Ghazal (SYR), who trains in war ravaged Damascus both cleared with one miss. Both Edgar Rivera (MEX) and Mateusz Przybylko (GER) cleared on their final attempt to stay alive, while returning silver medalist and Olympic bronze medalist Bohdan Bondarenko (UKR) passed the height.

At 2.32 m Barshim remained perfect, while Lysenko also cleared on his first attempt. Nobody else was able to clear, leaving Ghazal with the bronze. At 2.35 m (7 ft 8 1/2 in) Barshim again remained perfect, while Lysenko couldn't get over a new personal best, leaving him with silver, Barshim a perfectly clean competition to the gold medal. Barshim moved the bar up to 2.40 m when he finally missed three times.

== Records ==
Before the competition records were as follows:

Record	Perf.	Athlete	Nat.	Date	Location
World	2.45	Javier Sotomayor	CUB	27 Jul 1993	Salamanca, Spain
Championship	2.41	Bohdan Bondarenko	UKR	15 Aug 2013	Moscow, Russia
World leading	2.38	Mutaz Essa Barshim	QAT	15 Jun 2017	Oslo, Norway
African	2.38	Jacques Freitag	RSA	5 Mar 2005	Oudtshoorn, South Africa
Asian	2.43	Mutaz Essa Barshim	QAT	5 Sep 2014	Brussels, Belgium
NACAC	2.45	Javier Sotomayor	CUB	27 Jul 1993	Salamanca, Spain
South American	2.33A	Gilmar Mayo	COL	17 Oct 1994	Pereira, Colombia
European	2.42	Patrik Sjöberg	SWE	30 Jun 1987	Stockholm, Sweden
European	2.42	Bohdan Bondarenko	UKR	14 Jun 2014	New York City, United States
Oceanian	2.36	Tim Forsyth	AUS	2 Mar 1997	Melbourne, Australia

No records were set at the competition.

== Qualification standard ==
The standard to qualify automatically for entry was 2.30 metres.

== Schedule ==
The event schedule, in local time (UTC+1), is as follows:

Date	Time	Round
11 August	11:15	Qualification
13 August	19:00	Final

== Results ==
=== Qualification ===
The qualification round took place on 11 August, in two groups, both starting at 11:15. Athletes attaining a mark of at least 2.31 metres ( Q ) or at least the 12 best performers ( q ) qualified for the final. The overall results were as follows:

Rank	Group	Name	Nationality	2.17	2.22	2.26	2.29	2.31	Mark	Notes
1	A	Mutaz Essa Barshim	Qatar	–	o	o	o	o	2.31	Q
2	A	Bohdan Bondarenko	Ukraine	–	o	–	xo	o	2.31	Q
3	B	Danil Lysenko	Authorised Neutral Athletes	o	o	o	o	xo	2.31	Q
4	A	Tihomir Ivanov	Bulgaria	o	o	xo	xo	xo	2.31	Q, PB
4	B	Mateusz Przybylko	Germany	o	o	xo	xo	xo	2.31	Q
6	A	Robbie Grabarz	Great Britain & N.I.	–	o	o	xo	xxo	2.31	Q, SB
7	A	Ilya Ivanyuk	Authorised Neutral Athletes	o	o	o	o	xxx	2.29	q
7	B	Majd Eddin Ghazal	Syria	o	o	o	o	xxx	2.29	q
7	A	Bryan McBride	United States	o	o	o	o	xxx	2.29	q
10	A	Eike Onnen	Germany	xo	xo	o	o	xxx	2.29	q
11	A	Edgar Rivera	Mexico	o	o	xxo	o	xxx	2.29	q
12	A	Wang Yu	China	o	xo	o	xo	xxx	2.29	q
13	B	Andriy Protsenko	Ukraine	xo	o	xo	xo	xxx	2.29	
14	B	Gianmarco Tamberi	Italy	o	xo	xo	xo	xxx	2.29	SB
15	A	Talles Frederico Silva	Brazil	o	o	xxo	xo	xxx	2.29	
16	A	Ricky Robertson	United States	o	o	xo	xxo	xxx	2.29	
17	B	Fernando Ferreira	Brazil	xo	xo	xo	xxo	xxx	2.29	
18	B	Michael Mason	Canada	o	o	o	xxx		2.26	
19	B	Eure Yáñez	Venezuela	xo	xxo	o	xxx		2.26	
20	A	Sylwester Bednarek	Poland	o	o	xo	xxx		2.26	
20	A	Nauraj Singh Randhawa	Malaysia	o	o	xo	xxx		2.26	
22	B	Takashi Eto	Japan	o	xo	xxx			2.22	
22	A	Donald Thomas	Bahamas	o	xo	xxx			2.22	
24	B	Zhang Guowei	China	xo	xo	xxx			2.22	
25	B	Woo Sang-hyeok	South Korea	xo	xxo	xxx			2.22	
26	B	Jeron Robinson	United States	xo	xxx				2.17	
	B	Erik Kynard	United States	xr					NH	

=== Final ===
The final took place on 13 August at 19:00. The results were as follows:

Rank	Name	Nationality	2.20	2.25	2.29	2.32	2.35	2.40	Mark	Notes
1st place, gold medalist(s)	Mutaz Essa Barshim	Qatar	o	o	o	o	o	xxx	2.35	
2nd place, silver medalist(s)	Danil Lysenko	Authorised Neutral Athletes	o	o	xo	o	xxx		2.32	
3rd place, bronze medalist(s)	Majd Eddin Ghazal	Syria	o	o	xo	xxx			2.29	
4	Edgar Rivera	Mexico	o	o	xxo	xxx			2.29	
5	Mateusz Przybylko	Germany	o	xo	xxo	xxx			2.29	
6	Robbie Grabarz	Great Britain & N.I.	o	o	xxx				2.25	
6	Ilya Ivanyuk	Authorised Neutral Athletes	o	o	xxx				2.25	
8	Bryan McBride	United States	o	xo	xxx				2.25	
9	Bohdan Bondarenko	Ukraine	–	xxo	–	xxx			2.25	
10	Eike Onnen	Germany	xxo	xxx					2.20	
	Tihomir Ivanov	Bulgaria	xr						NH	
	Wang Yu	China							DNS	
