= Danil Lysenko =

Russian high jumper

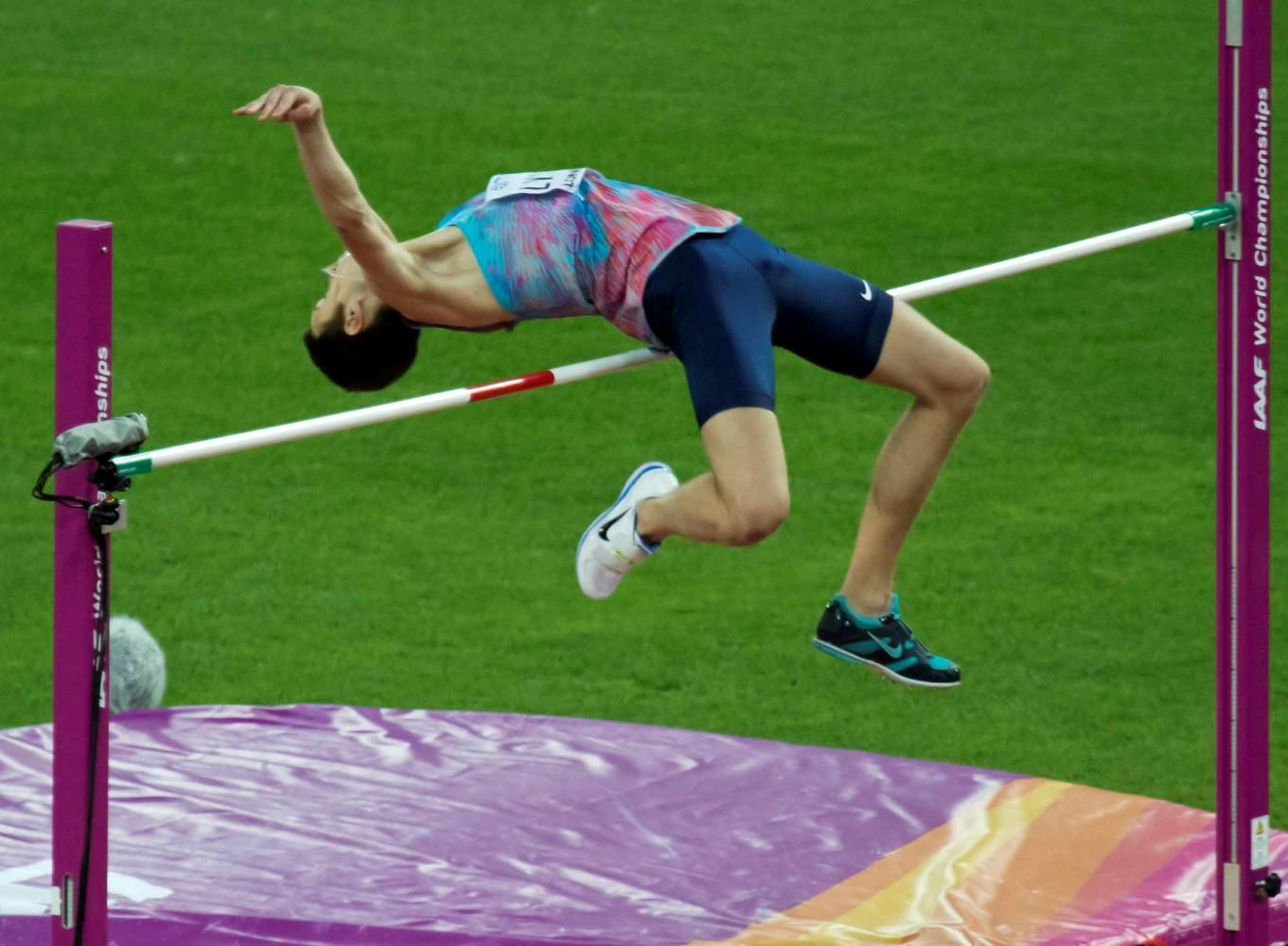

Personal information
- Nationality: Russian
- Born: 19 May 1997 (age 29) Birsk, Russia
- Height: 192 cm (6 ft 4 in)
- Weight: 73 kg (161 lb)

Sport
- Country: Russia; Authorised Neutral Athletes (2017–2018)
- Sport: Track and field
- Event: High jump

Achievements and titles
- Personal best: 2.38 m (2017)
Medal record
World Championships
Silver medal – second place	2017 London	High jump
World Indoor Championships
Gold medal – first place	2018 Birmingham	High jump
Youth Olympic Games
Gold medal – first place	2014 Nanjing	High jump

Danil Sergeyevich Lysenko (Russian: Данил Сергеевич Лысенко; born 19 May 1997) is a Russian track and field athlete who specialises in the high jump. He won the silver medal at the 2017 World Championships. He is currently banned from the sport for doping violations and fraud.

== Career ==
Lysenko won his first international medal at the second Summer Youth Olympics, winning a gold medal in the boys' high jump with a clearance of 2.20 m, ahead of Yuji Hiramatsu.

In August 2018, Lysenko was stripped of his Authorized Neutral Athlete status and provisionally suspended, due to his failure to provide whereabouts information as required under IAAF Anti-Doping Rules and Regulations. Lysenko missed three drugs tests between September 2017 and June 2018 which constitutes an anti-doping violation. However, he provided documents stating that he had missed his second test due to being in hospital with acute appendicitis. Further investigations found that the hospital Lysenko was supposedly treated at did not actually exist and he had obtained forged documents through the help of officials at the Russian Athletics Federation. Former President Dmitry Shlyakhtin, board member Artur Karamyan and executive director Alexander Parkin were banned from Athletics for four years by the IAAF, as were senior administrator Elena Orlova and anti-doping coordinator Elena Ikonnikova. Lysenko's coach, Evgeniy Zagorulko, was also banned for four years and in July 2021, Lysenko himself received a six-year disqualification from CAS. He kept competing in Russia despite the ban.

== International competitions ==
Year	Competition	Venue	Position	Event	Notes
Representing Russia
2013	European Youth Olympic Festival	Utrecht, Netherlands	1st	High jump	2.08
2014	World Junior Championships	Eugene, United States	6th	High jump	2.22
2014	Youth Olympic Games	Nanjing, China	1st	High jump	2.20
2015	European Junior Championships	Eskilstuna, Sweden	5th	High jump	2.17
Competing as an Authorised Neutral Athlete
2017	World Championships	London, United Kingdom	2nd	High jump	2.32
2018	World Indoor Championships	Birmingham, United Kingdom	1st	High jump	2.36
2018	IAAF Diamond League	Monaco, Monaco	1st	High jump	2.40

== Personal bests ==
Event	Mark	Place	Date
High jump (outdoor)	2.38 m (7 ft 9 1/2 in)	Eberstadt	27 August 2017
High jump (indoor)	2.38 m (7 ft 9 1/2 in)	Moscow	29 January 2023

== See also ==
- List of doping cases in athletics

Sporting positions
Preceded by (Qatar) Mutaz Essa Barshim	Men's High Jump Best Year Performance alongside (Qatar) Mutaz Essa Barshim; 2018	Succeeded by (Qatar) Mutaz Essa Barshim
