= 2018 IAAF World Indoor Championships =

17th IAAF World Indoor Championships
- Dates: 1–4 March
- Host city: Birmingham, United Kingdom
- Venue: Arena Birmingham
- Events: 26
- Participation: 554 athletes from 134 nations

The 17th IAAF World Indoor Championships was held from 1 to 4 March 2018 in Birmingham, United Kingdom. This was the city's second hosting of the event as it previously did so in 2003.

== Bidding process ==
Birmingham bid for the 2016 IAAF World Indoor Championships as well as the 2018 event. Portland was selected unanimously to host the 2016 event with Birmingham being the only other bidder. With Portland then out of the running for the 2018 event Birmingham was selected as the host of the 2018 event. The reason Portland was selected for 2016 and Birmingham for 2018 is that the IAAF wanted more time between events in the UK with London hosting the 2012 Summer Olympics as well as the 2017 World Championships in Athletics along with Cardiff hosting the 2016 IAAF World Half Marathon Championships. Portland would become the beginning of a similar sequence for the US, with the 2021 World Championships in Eugene, Oregon and the 2028 Summer Olympics in Los Angeles.

== Venue ==
The event took place at the National Indoor Arena with seating for 8,000 spectators.

== Schedule ==
| H | Heats | ½ | Semi-finals | F | Final |
M = morning session, A = afternoon session

All dates are GMT (UTC±0)

Men
| Date → | 1 March | 2 March | | 3 March | | | 4 March | |
| Event ↓ | A | M | A | M | A | | A | |
|---|---|---|---|---|---|---|---|---|
| 60 m | | | | H | ½ | F | | |
| 400 m | | H | ½ | | F | | | |
| 800 m | | | H | | F | | | |
| 1500 m | | | | H | | | F | |
| 3000 m | | H | | | | | F | |
| 60 m hurdles | | | | | H | | ½ | F |
| 4 × 400 m | | | | H | | | F | |
| High jump | F | | | | | | | |
| Pole vault | | | | | | | F | |
| Long jump | | | F | | | | | |
| Triple jump | | | | | F | | | |
| Shot put | | | | F | | | | |
| Heptathlon | | F | | | | | | |

Women
| Date → | 1 March | 2 March | | | 3 March | | | 4 March |
| Event ↓ | A | M | A | | M | A | | A |
|---|---|---|---|---|---|---|---|---|
| 60 m | | H | ½ | F | | | | |
| 400 m | | H | ½ | | | F | | |
| 800 m | | | | | H | | | F |
| 1500 m | | | H | | | F | | |
| 3000 m | F | | | | | | | |
| 60 m hurdles | | | H | | | ½ | F | |
| 4 × 400 m | | | | | H | | | F |
| High jump | F | | | | | | | |
| Pole vault | | | | | | F | | |
| Long jump | | | | | | | | F |
| Triple jump | | | | | F | | | |
| Shot put | | | F | | | | | |
| Pentathlon | | F | | | | | | |

== Entry standards ==
The qualification period for all events runs from 1 January 2017 to 19 February 2018 (midnight Monaco time), except for the Combined Events where the qualification period runs from 1 January 2017 to 31 December 2017 and the five best athletes from the 2018 Indoor Lists (as at 12 February 2018). Twelve athletes will be invited in the Heptathlon and in the Pentathlon as follows: the winner of the 2017 Combined Events Challenge. One athlete which may be invited at the discretion of the IAAF. In total no more than two male and two female athletes from any one Member will be invited. Upon refusals or cancellations, the invitations shall be extended to the next ranked athletes in the same lists respecting the above conditions.

| Event | Men | | | Women | | |
| Event | Indoor | Outdoor | | Indoor | Outdoor | |
|---|---|---|---|---|---|---|
| 60 metres | 6.63 | 10.10 | 100 m | 7.30 | 11.15 | 100 m |
| 400 metres | 46.70 | 45.00 | | 53.15 | 51.10 | |
| 800 metres | 1:46.50 | 1:44.00 | | 2:02.00 | 1:58.00 | |
| 1500 metres | 3:39.50 | 3:33.00 | 1500 m | 4:11.00 | 4:02.00 | 1500 m |
| 1500 metres | 3:39.50 | 3:55.00 | Mile | 4:11.00 | 4:28.50 | Mile |
| 3000 metres | 7:52.00 | 7:40.00 | 3000 m | 8:50.00 | 8:28.00 | 3000 m |
| 3000 metres | 7:52.00 | 13:10.00 | 5000 m | 8:50.00 | 14:45.00 | 5000 m |
| 60 metres hurdles | 7.70 | 13.40 | 110 m h | 8.14 | 12.80 | 100 m h |
| High jump | 2.33 m | | | 1.97 m | | |
| Pole vault | 5.78 m | | | 4.71 m | | |
| Long jump | 8.19 m | | | 6.76 m | | |
| Triple jump | 17.05 m | | | 14.30 m | | |
| Shot put | 20.80 m | | | 18.20 m | | |
| 4 × 400 metres relay | No Standard | | | No Standard | | |

== Medal summary ==
=== Men ===
| Event | Gold | | Silver | | Bronze | |
|---|---|---|---|---|---|---|
| 60 metres | Christian Coleman; United States | 6.37 CR | Su Bingtian; China | 6.42 AR | Ronnie Baker; United States | 6.44 |
| 400 metres | Pavel Maslák; Czech Republic | 45.47 SB | Michael Cherry; United States | 45.84 | Deon Lendore; Trinidad and Tobago | 46.37 |
| 800 metres | Adam Kszczot; Poland | 1:47.47 | Drew Windle; United States | 1:47.99 | Saúl Ordóñez; Spain | 1:48.01 |
| 1500 metres | Samuel Tefera; Ethiopia | 3:58.19 | Marcin Lewandowski; Poland | 3:58.39 | Abdelaati Iguider; Morocco | 3:58.43 |
| 3000 metres | Yomif Kejelcha; Ethiopia | 8:14.41 | Selemon Barega; Ethiopia | 8:15.59 | Bethwell Birgen; Kenya | 8:15.70 |
| 60 metres hurdles | Andrew Pozzi; Great Britain | 7.46 SB | Jarret Eaton; United States | 7.47 | Aurel Manga; France | 7.54 |
| 4 × 400 metres relay | Poland (POL); Karol Zalewski; Rafał Omelko; Łukasz Krawczuk; Jakub Krzewina; Patryk Adamczyk* | 3:01.77 WR | United States (USA); Fred Kerley; Michael Cherry; Aldrich Bailey; Vernon Norwood; Marqueze Washington*; Paul Dedewo* | 3:01.97 SB | Belgium (BEL); Dylan Borlée; Jonathan Borlée; Jonathan Sacoor; Kevin Borlée | 3:02.51 NR |
| High jump | Danil Lysenko; Authorised Neutral Athletes | 2.36 m | Mutaz Essa Barshim; Qatar | 2.33 m | Mateusz Przybylko; Germany | 2.29 m |
| Pole vault | Renaud Lavillenie; France | 5.90 m | Sam Kendricks; United States | 5.85 m | Piotr Lisek; Poland | 5.85 m |
| Long jump | Juan Miguel Echevarría; Cuba | 8.46 m WL | Luvo Manyonga; South Africa | 8.44 m AR | Marquis Dendy; United States | 8.42 m PB |
| Triple jump | Will Claye; United States | 17.43 m WL | Almir dos Santos; Brazil | 17.41 m PB | Nelson Évora; Portugal | 17.40 m NR |
| Shot put | Tomas Walsh; New Zealand | 22.31 m CR, AR | David Storl; Germany | 21.44 m SB | Tomáš Staněk; Czech Republic | 21.44 m |
| Heptathlon | Kevin Mayer; France | 6348 pts WL | Damian Warner; Canada | 6343 pts NR | Maicel Uibo; Estonia | 6265 pts PB |

- Note: * = Relay athletes who only ran in heats

=== Women ===
| Event | Gold | | Silver | | Bronze | |
|---|---|---|---|---|---|---|
| 60 metres | Murielle Ahouré; Ivory Coast | 6.97 WL, NR | Marie-Josée Ta Lou; Ivory Coast | 7.05 PB | Mujinga Kambundji; Switzerland | 7.05 |
| 400 metres | Courtney Okolo; United States | 50.55 PB | Shakima Wimbley; United States | 51.47 | Eilidh Doyle; Great Britain | 51.60 SB |
| 800 metres | Francine Niyonsaba; Burundi | 1:58.31 WL, NR | Ajeé Wilson; United States | 1:58.99 PB | Shelayna Oskan-Clarke; Great Britain | 1:59.81 PB |
| 1500 metres | Genzebe Dibaba; Ethiopia | 4:05.27 | Laura Muir; Great Britain | 4:06.23 | Sifan Hassan; Netherlands | 4:07.26 |
| 3000 metres | Genzebe Dibaba; Ethiopia | 8:45.05 | Sifan Hassan; Netherlands | 8:45.68 SB | Laura Muir; Great Britain | 8:45.78 SB |
| 60 metres hurdles | Kendra Harrison; United States | 7.70 CR, =AR | Christina Manning; United States | 7.79 | Nadine Visser; Netherlands | 7.84 |
| 4 × 400 metres relay | United States (USA); Quanera Hayes; Georganne Moline; Shakima Wimbley; Courtney Okolo; Joanna Atkins*; Raevyn Rogers* | 3:23.85 CR | Poland (POL); Justyna Święty-Ersetic; Patrycja Wyciszkiewicz; Aleksandra Gaworska; Małgorzata Hołub-Kowalik; Joanna Linkiewicz*; Natalia Kaczmarek* | 3:26.09 NR | Great Britain (GBR); Meghan Beesley; Hannah Williams; Amy Allcock; Zoey Clark; Anyika Onuora* | 3:29.38 SB |
| High jump | Mariya Lasitskene; Authorised Neutral Athletes | 2.01 m | Vashti Cunningham; United States | 1.93 m | Alessia Trost; Italy | 1.93 m SB |
| Pole vault | Sandi Morris; United States | 4.95 m CR, WL | Anzhelika Sidorova; Authorised Neutral Athletes | 4.90 m PB | Katerina Stefanidi; Greece | 4.80 m |
| Long jump | Ivana Španović; Serbia | 6.96 WL | Brittney Reese; United States | 6.89 m SB | Sosthene Moguenara-Taroum; Germany | 6.85 m SB |
| Triple jump | Yulimar Rojas; Venezuela | 14.63 m WL | Kimberly Williams; Jamaica | 14.48 m PB | Ana Peleteiro; Spain | 14.40 m PB |
| Shot put | Anita Márton; Hungary | 19.62 m WL, NR | Danniel Thomas-Dodd; Jamaica | 19.22 m NR | Gong Lijiao; China | 19.08 m SB |
| Pentathlon | Katarina Johnson-Thompson; Great Britain | 4750 pts SB | Ivona Dadic; Austria | 4700 SB | Yorgelis Rodríguez; Cuba | 4637 pts NR |

== Medal table ==
* Host nation (Great Britain)

| Rank | Nation | Gold | Silver | Bronze | Total |
|---|---|---|---|---|---|
| 1 | United States (USA) | 6 | 10 | 2 | 18 |
| 2 | Ethiopia (ETH) | 4 | 1 | 0 | 5 |
| 3 | Poland (POL) | 2 | 2 | 1 | 5 |
| 4 | Great Britain (GBR)* | 2 | 1 | 4 | 7 |
| – | Authorised Neutral Athletes (ANA)^{[1]} | 2 | 1 | 0 | 3 |
| 5 | France (FRA) | 2 | 0 | 1 | 3 |
| 6 | Ivory Coast (CIV) | 1 | 1 | 0 | 2 |
| 7 | Cuba (CUB) | 1 | 0 | 1 | 2 |
| 7 | Czech Republic (CZE) | 1 | 0 | 1 | 2 |
| 9 | Burundi (BDI) | 1 | 0 | 0 | 1 |
| 9 | Hungary (HUN) | 1 | 0 | 0 | 1 |
| 9 | New Zealand (NZL) | 1 | 0 | 0 | 1 |
| 9 | Serbia (SRB) | 1 | 0 | 0 | 1 |
| 9 | Venezuela (VEN) | 1 | 0 | 0 | 1 |
| 14 | Jamaica (JAM) | 0 | 2 | 0 | 2 |
| 15 | Germany (GER) | 0 | 1 | 2 | 3 |
| 15 | Netherlands (NED) | 0 | 1 | 2 | 3 |
| 17 | China (CHN) | 0 | 1 | 1 | 2 |
| 18 | Austria (AUT) | 0 | 1 | 0 | 1 |
| 18 | Brazil (BRA) | 0 | 1 | 0 | 1 |
| 18 | Canada (CAN) | 0 | 1 | 0 | 1 |
| 18 | Qatar (QAT) | 0 | 1 | 0 | 1 |
| 18 | South Africa (RSA) | 0 | 1 | 0 | 1 |
| 23 | Spain (ESP) | 0 | 0 | 2 | 2 |
| 24 | Belgium (BEL) | 0 | 0 | 1 | 1 |
| 24 | Estonia (EST) | 0 | 0 | 1 | 1 |
| 24 | Greece (GRE) | 0 | 0 | 1 | 1 |
| 24 | Italy (ITA) | 0 | 0 | 1 | 1 |
| 24 | Kenya (KEN) | 0 | 0 | 1 | 1 |
| 24 | Morocco (MAR) | 0 | 0 | 1 | 1 |
| 24 | Portugal (POR) | 0 | 0 | 1 | 1 |
| 24 | Switzerland (SUI) | 0 | 0 | 1 | 1 |
| 24 | Trinidad and Tobago (TTO) | 0 | 0 | 1 | 1 |
| Totals (32 entries) | | 26 | 26 | 26 | 78 |

Notes

^[1] IAAF does not include the three medals (2 gold, 1 silver) won by athletes competing as Authorised Neutral Athletes in their official medal table.

== Participating nations ==
In brackets the number of athletes participating.

- Albania (1)
- Andorra (1)
- Argentina (1)
- Armenia (1)
- Aruba (1)
- Australia (7)
- Austria (4)
- Authorised Neutral Athletes (7)
- Azerbaijan (1)
- Bahamas (5)
- Bahrain (1)
- Belarus (8)
- Belgium (5)
- Belize (1)
- Bermuda (1)
- Bosnia and Herzegovina (1)
- Brazil (7)
- British Virgin Islands (1)
- Bulgaria (5)
- Burkina Faso (1)
- Burundi (3)
- Cambodia (1)
- Canada (15)
- Cayman Islands (1)
- Chile (1)
- China (13)
- Comoros (1)
- Cook Islands (1)
- Costa Rica (2)
- Croatia (2)
- Cuba (8)
- Cyprus (1)
- Czech Republic (21)
- Denmark (1)
- Djibouti (3)
- Dominica (1)
- Dominican Republic (5)
- Egypt (1)
- Equatorial Guinea (1)
- Estonia (2)
- Ethiopia (9)
- Federated States of Micronesia (1)
- Fiji (1)
- Finland (3)
- France (10)
- French Polynesia (1)
- Germany (22)
- Ghana (2)
- Gibraltar (1)
- Great Britain (30)
- Greece (9)
- Grenada (3)
- Guinea-Bissau (1)
- Haiti (1)
- Honduras (1)
- Hong Kong (1)
- Hungary (5)
- Iceland (1)
- India (1)
- Indonesia (1)
- Iran (1)
- Ireland (5)
- Italy (12)
- Ivory Coast (5)
- Jamaica (23)
- Japan (1)
- Jordan (1)
- Kazakhstan (5)
- Kenya (8)
- Kosovo (1)
- Kuwait (2)
- Kyrgyzstan (1)
- Latvia (4)
- Lebanon (1)
- Lithuania (2)
- Macau (1)
- Macedonia (1)
- Madagascar (1)
- Maldives (1)
- Mali (1)
- Malta (1)
- Mauritius (1)
- Mexico (1)
- Moldova (1)
- Montserrat (1)
- Morocco (6)
- Namibia (1)
- Nauru (1)
- Netherlands (8)
- New Zealand (4)
- Nicaragua (1)
- Nigeria (4)
- Northern Mariana Islands (1)
- Norway (3)
- Oman (1)
- Pakistan (1)
- Papua New Guinea (1)
- Peru (1)
- Philippines (1)
- Poland (26)
- Portugal (8)
- Puerto Rico (1)
- Qatar (3)
- Romania (4)
- Saint Kitts and Nevis (1)
- Saint Lucia (2)
- Saint Vincent and the Grenadines (1)
- El Salvador (1)
- San Marino (1)
- Saudi Arabia (2)
- Serbia (4)
- Seychelles (1)
- Sierra Leone (1)
- Slovakia (3)
- Slovenia (2)
- Solomon Islands (1)
- Somalia (1)
- South Africa (5)
- South Sudan (1)
- Spain (16)
- Swaziland (1)
- Sweden (14)
- Switzerland (5)
- Tajikistan (1)
- Trinidad and Tobago (12)
- Turkey (1)
- Tuvalu (1)
- Ukraine (13)
- United States (53)
- United States Virgin Islands (1)
- Uruguay (1)
- Vanuatu (1)
- Venezuela (2)
- Zambia (1)

== Disqualifications ==
This championship was notable for the large number of disqualifications, primarily lane violations (IAAF rule 163.3(a)). One entire heat of the Men's 400 metres was disqualified, a World Championship first. Some athletes appeared to have difficulty with the steep banking of the track. Accusations were raised about the heavy handedness of the officiating and inconsistencies relative to similar acts committed by star British athletes at the 2017 Outdoor World Championships held in London just 5 and a half months earlier.
