= Athletics at the 2025 Summer World University Games – Men's high jump =

Men's high jump at the 2025 Summer World University Games
- Venue: Lohrheidestadion
- Location: Bochum, Germany
- Dates: 22 July (qualification); 24 July (final)
- Competitors: 23 from 20 nations
- Winning height: 2.27 m

Medalists
gold medal	Yonathan Kapitolnik	Israel
silver medal	Fu Chao-hsuan	Chinese Taipei
bronze medal	Roman Anastasios	Australia

The men's high jump event at the 2025 Summer World University Games was held in Bochum, Germany, at Lohrheidestadion on 22 and 24 July.

== Records ==
Prior to the competition, the records were as follows:

Record	Athlete (nation)	Distance (m)	Location	Date
Games record	Luis Delis (URS)	2.41 m	Kobe, Japan	4 September 1985

== Results ==
=== Qualification ===
All athletes over 2.25 m (Q) or at least the 12 best performers (q) advance to the final.

==== Group A ====
Place	Athlete	Nation	1.93	1.98	2.03	2.08	2.13	Result	Notes
1	Fu Chao-hsuan	Chinese Taipei	-	-	-	o	o	2.13 m	q
1	Roman Petruk	Ukraine	-	-	o	o	o	2.13 m	q
1	Aiden Grout	Canada	-	-	o	o	o	2.13 m	q
1	Mateusz Kołodziejski	Poland	-	-	o	o	o	2.13 m	q
1	Sota Haraguchi	Japan	-	-	-	o	o	2.13 m	q
6	Farrell Glenn Felix	Malaysia	-	o	xo	xo	xxx	2.08 m	
7	Choi Jin-woo	South Korea	o	o	xo	xxx		2.03 m	
7	Joakim Wadstein	Sweden	o	o	xo	xxx		2.03 m	
9	Gergely Török	Hungary	-	o	xxr			1.98 m	
—	Chi Kit Ng	Macau	xxx					NM	
—	Ayham al Hosni	Oman	xr					NM	

==== Group B ====
Place	Athlete	Nation	1.93	1.98	2.03	2.08	2.13	Result	Notes
1	Yonathan Kapitolnik	Israel	-	-	-	o	o	2.13 m	q
1	Erick Portillo	Mexico	-	-	-	o	o	2.13 m	q
1	Manuel Lando	Italy	-	-	-	o	o	2.13 m	q
4	Roman Anastasios	Australia	-	-	-	o	xo	2.13 m	q
4	Shun Yamanaka	Japan	-	-	-	o	xo	2.13 m	q
6	Nicolás Numair	Belgium	o	o	o	o	xxx	2.08 m	q
6	Sten Geenens	Chile	-	-	o	o	xxx	2.08 m	q
8	Po-Ting Yeh	Chinese Taipei	-	-	o	xo	xxx	2.08 m	
9	Shazil Ahmed	Pakistan	o	o	o	xxx		2.03 m	=PB
10	Bharathraj Bijuraj	India	-	-	xo	xxx		2.03 m	
11	Mátyás Guth	Hungary	o	xo	xo	xxx		2.03 m	
12	Santiago Santos	Ecuador	xo	xo	xxx			1.98 m	=PB

=== Final ===
Place	Athlete	Nation	2.03	2.08	2.13	2.17	2.20	2.23	2.25	2.27	Result	Notes
1st place, gold medalist(s)	Yonathan Kapitolnik	Israel	-	-	o	o	o	xxo	-	xxo	2.27 m	
2nd place, silver medalist(s)	Fu Chao-hsuan	Chinese Taipei	-	o	o	o		o	o	xxx	2.25 m	
3rd place, bronze medalist(s)	Roman Anastasios	Australia	-	o	xo	xo	o	xxx			2.20 m	=SB
4	Mateusz Kołodziejski	Poland	o	o	o	o	xo	xxx			2.20 m	
4	Erick Portillo	Mexico	-	-	o	o	xo	xxx			2.20 m	
6	Manuel Lando	Italy	-	o	xo	xo	xo	xxx			2.20 m	
7	Shun Yamanaka	Japan	o	o	o	xo	xxx				2.17 m	
8	Nicolás Numair	Belgium	o	o	o	xxo	xxx				2.17 m	SB
9	Aiden Grout	Canada	o	o	xo	xxx					2.13 m	
10	Sota Haraguchi	Japan	-	xo	xo	xxx					2.13 m	
11	Sten Geenens	Chile	o	xxo	xxx						2.08 m	
—	Roman Petruk	Ukraine	-	xxx							NM	
