= Athletics at the 2026 Asian Games – Men's high jump =

Men's high jump at the 2026 Asian Games
- Venue: Mizuho Park Athletics Stadium
- Date: 27 September 2026
- Competitors: 13 from 10 nations
- Winning height: 2.25 m

Medalists
| gold medal | Fu Chao-hsuan | Chinese Taipei |
| silver medal | Sarvesh Kushare | India |
| bronze medal | Woo Sang-hyeok | South Korea |

The men's high jump competition at the 2026 Asian Games took place on 27 September 2026 at the Mizuho Park Athletics Stadium, Nagoya. The event was competed by 13 competitors from 10 nations. Fu Chao-hsuan of Chinese Taipei won the gold with a jump of 2.25 m (7 ft 5 in). Sarvesh Kushare of India and Woo Sang-hyeok of South Korea won the silver and bronze medals respectively.

== Background ==
The men's high jump event was first competed in the inaugural edition in 1951. It has been contested at every edition of the Asian Games since then.

Qatar's Mutaz Barsham was a three time Asian Games winner and the defending champion. He is the Asian record holder with a best of 2.43 m (8 ft 0 in). He was also a three time World Champion and a gold medalist at the 2020 Summer Olympics. South Korea's Woo Sang-hyeok won silver medals at the 2018 Asian Games and 2022 Asian Games. He had cleared 2.35 m (7 ft 9 in) at the 2020 Summer Olympics in Tokyo in 2021, establishing a new South Korean national record, and equaled his record at the to win the silver medal at the 2022 World Athletics Championships. In the run up to the 2026 Asian Games, Woo was recovering from a foot injury sustained in May.

Sarvesh Kushare was the Indian national record holder with a mark of 2.31 m (7 ft 7 in). In July, he finished third at the Monaco Diamond League with a jump of 2.26 m (7 ft 5 in), thereby becoming the first Indian high jumper to finish in the top three at a Diamond League meet. Chinese Taipei's Fu Chao-hsuan had a personal best of 2.27 m (7 ft 5 in) set in February 2025. He had a season's best of 2.25 m (7 ft 5 in) coming into the competition.

== Schedule ==
The medalists in the men's high jump event was decided in a single final on 27 September 2026 held at the Mizuho Park Athletics Stadium in Nagoya.

All times are Japan Standard Time (UTC+09:00)

Schedule
| Date | Time | Event |
|---|---|---|
| 27 September 2026 | 19:45 | Final |

== Records ==
Prior to this competition, the existing world, Asian and Games records were as follows.

| World Record | Javier Sotomayor (CUB) | 2.45 | Salamanca, Spain | 27 July 1993 |
| Asian Record | Mutaz Barsham (QAT) | 2.43 | Bruxelles, Belgium | 4 September 2014 |
| Games Record | Mutaz Barsham (QAT) | 2.35 | Hangzhou, China | 3 October 2023 |

== Summary ==
The competition was held in rainy condition. Asian record holder Mutaz Barsham withdrew from the event before the final with a foot injury. The event was eventually competed by 13 athletes from 10 nations.

Fu Chao-hsuan won the gold medal after clearing 2.25 m (7 ft 5 in) on his first attempt. This was Chinese Taipei's first gold medal in the event at the Asian Games and the first medal in the event since Liao Hsueh-sung won a bronze medal in the 1990 Asian Games. Kushare also cleared the height of 2.25 m (7 ft 5 in), but he did so during his second attempt, and hence had to settle for a silver medal on countback. The result ended India's 56-year wait for a medal in the men's high jump at the Asian Games after Bhim Singh won a bronze medal at the 1970 Asian Games.

Woo Sang-hyeok won bronze after clearing a height of 2.22 m (7 ft 3 in). While all the three medalists cleared the height in their first attempts, Woo Sang-hyeok failed to clear 2.25 m (7 ft 5 in) in two attempts and subsequently attempted 2.28 m (7 ft 6 in) but was unable to clear the same. This was Woo Sang-hyeok's third consecutive Asian Games medal.

== Results ==
| Rank | Athlete | Attempt | | | | | | | | | Result | Notes |
| Rank | Athlete | 1.95 | 2.00 | 2.05 | 2.10 | 2.14 | 2.18 | 2.22 | 2.25 | 2.28 | Result | Notes |
|---|---|---|---|---|---|---|---|---|---|---|---|---|
| 1st place, gold medalist(s) | Fu Chao-hsuan (TPE) | – | – | – | O | – | XO | O | O | XXX | 2.25 | =SB |
| 2nd place, silver medalist(s) | Sarvesh Kushare (IND) | – | – | – | O | O | O | O | XO | XXX | 2.25 | |
| 3rd place, bronze medalist(s) | Woo Sang-hyeok (KOR) | – | – | – | O | XO | O | O | XX- | X | 2.22 | |
| 4 | Hirokazu Sakai (JPN) | – | – | – | O | O | O | XXX | | | 2.18 | |
| 5 | Tawan Kaeodam (THA) | – | – | XO | O | O | XO | XXX | | | 2.18 | SB |
| 6 | Fatak Bait Jaboob (OMA) | – | O | O | O | XO | XXX | | | | 2.14 | |
| 7 | Ryoichi Akamatsu (JPN) | – | – | – | O | – | XXX | | | | 2.10 | |
| 8 | Kampton Kam (SGP) | – | O | XO | XXO | XXX | | | | | 2.10 | |
| 9 | Leonard Grospe (PHI) | – | O | O | XXX | | | | | | 2.05 | |
| =10 | Michael Kennelly (HKG) | O | O | XO | XXX | | | | | | 2.05 | |
| =10 | Ho Ho Wai (HKG) | O | O | XO | XXX | | | | | | 2.05 | |
| 12 | Ahmed Mohamoud (BHR) | O | XO | XO | XXX | | | | | | 2.05 | |
| 13 | Aadarsh Jothi Shankar (IND) | – | XO | XXO | XR | | | | | | 2.05 | |
| | Mutaz Barsham (QAT) | | | | | | | | | | DNS | |
