= 2025 Asian Athletics Championships – Men's high jump =

Men's high jump at the 2025 Asian Athletics Championships
- Venue: Gumi Civic Stadium
- Location: Gumi, South Korea
- Dates: 27 May (qualification); 29 May (final)
- Competitors: 23 from 17 nations
- Winning height: 2.29 m

Medalists
gold medal	Woo Sang-hyeok	South Korea
silver medal	Tomohiro Shinno	Japan
bronze medal	Tawan Kaewkam	Thailand

The men's high jump event at the 2025 Asian Athletics Championships was held on 27 and 29 May.

== Records ==
Records before the 2025 Asian Athletics Championships
Record	Athlete (nation)	Height (m)	Location	Date
World record	Javier Sotomayor (CUB)	2.45	Salamanca, Spain	27 July 1993
Asian record	Mutaz Barsham (QAT)	2.43	Brussels, Belgium	5 September 2014
Championship record	Mutaz Barsham (QAT)	2.35	Kobe, Japan	9 July 2011
World leading	Oleh Doroshchuk (UKR)	2.34	Apeldoorn, Netherlands	8 March 2025
Asian leading	Sanghyeok Woo (KOR)	2.31	Hustopeče, Czech Republic	8 February 2025

== Schedule ==
The event schedule, in local time (UTC+9), was as follows:

Date	Time	Round
27 May	09:15	Qualification
29 May	21:40	Final

== Results ==
=== Qualification ===
Held on 27 May.

==== Group A ====
Place	Athlete	Nation	1.85	1.95	2.05	2.10	2.15	Results	Notes
1	Tomohiro Shinno	Japan	–	–	–	o		2.10	q
2	Tawan Kaewkam	Thailand	–	xo	o	o		2.10	q, SB
3	Vadim Chikalov	Uzbekistan	–	–	o	xxx		2.05	q
4	Leonard Grospe	Philippines	–	o	xxo	xxx		2.05	q
5	Mahfuzur Rahman	Bangladesh	–	xo	xxo	x–		2.05	
6	Michael John Kennelly	Hong Kong	o	xo	xxo	xxx		2.05	
7	Khaled Al-Massad	Kuwait	–	o	xxx			1.95	
8	Ng Chi Kit	Macau	o	xo	xxx			1.95	
—	Choi Jin-woo	South Korea	x–					NM	
—	Yeh Po-ting	Chinese Taipei	–	–	xxx			NM	
—	Kampton Kam	Singapore						DNS	

==== Group B ====
Place	Athlete	Nation	1.85	1.95	2.05	2.10	2.15	Results	Notes
1	Fatak Bait Jaboob	Oman	–	o	o	o	o	2.15	q
1	Fu Chao-hsuan	Chinese Taipei	–	–	o	o	o	2.15	q
1	Woo Sang-hyeok	South Korea	–	–	–	–	o	2.15	q
4	Lesandu Arthavidu Gammanage	Sri Lanka	–	–	o	o	–	2.10	q
4	Sarvesh Kushare	India	–	–	o	o	–	2.10	q
4	Naoto Hasegawa	Japan	–	–	o	o	–	2.10	q
7	Duan Yuhang	China	–	–	o	xo	–	2.10	q
8	Amir Nagayev	Uzbekistan	–	o	o	xxx		2.05	q
9	Farrell Glenn Felix	Malaysia	–	o	xxo	xxx		2.05	q
10	Khaled Al-Obaidli	Kuwait	–	xo	xxx			1.95	
10	Lai Pak Hei	Hong Kong	–	xo	xxx			1.95	
10	Salim Saidalijew	Tajikistan	o	xo	xxx			1.95	

=== Final ===
Place	Athlete	Nation	2.10	2.15	2.19	2.23	2.26	2.29	2.31	2.33	Results	Notes
1st place, gold medalist(s)	Woo Sang-hyeok	South Korea	-	o	o	o	o	o	-	xxx	2.29 m	
2nd place, silver medalist(s)	Tomohiro Shinno	Japan	o	o	o	o	o	-	xxx		2.26 m	SB
3rd place, bronze medalist(s)	Tawan Kaewkam	Thailand	o	xxo	xo	xo	xxx				2.23 m	SB
4	Naoto Hasegawa	Japan	o	xo	o	xxo	xxx				2.23 m	SB
5	Sarvesh Kushare	India	o	xo	xo	xxx					2.19 m	
6	Duan Yuhang	China	o	o	xxx						2.15 m	
6	Fu Chao-hsuan	Chinese Taipei	-	o	-	xxx					2.15 m	
8	Amir Nagaev	Uzbekistan	xo	xxx							2.10 m	SB
8	Lesandu Arthavidu Gammanage	Sri Lanka	xo	xxx							2.10 m	
8	Fatak Bait Jaboob	Oman	xo	xxx							2.10 m	
11	Leonard Grospe	Philippines	xxo	xxx							2.10 m	
—	Vadim Chikalov	Uzbekistan	xxx								NM	
—	Farrell Glenn Felix Jurus	Malaysia	xxx								NM	
