= 2024 European Athletics Championships – Men's high jump =

Men's high jump at the 2024 European Athletics Championships
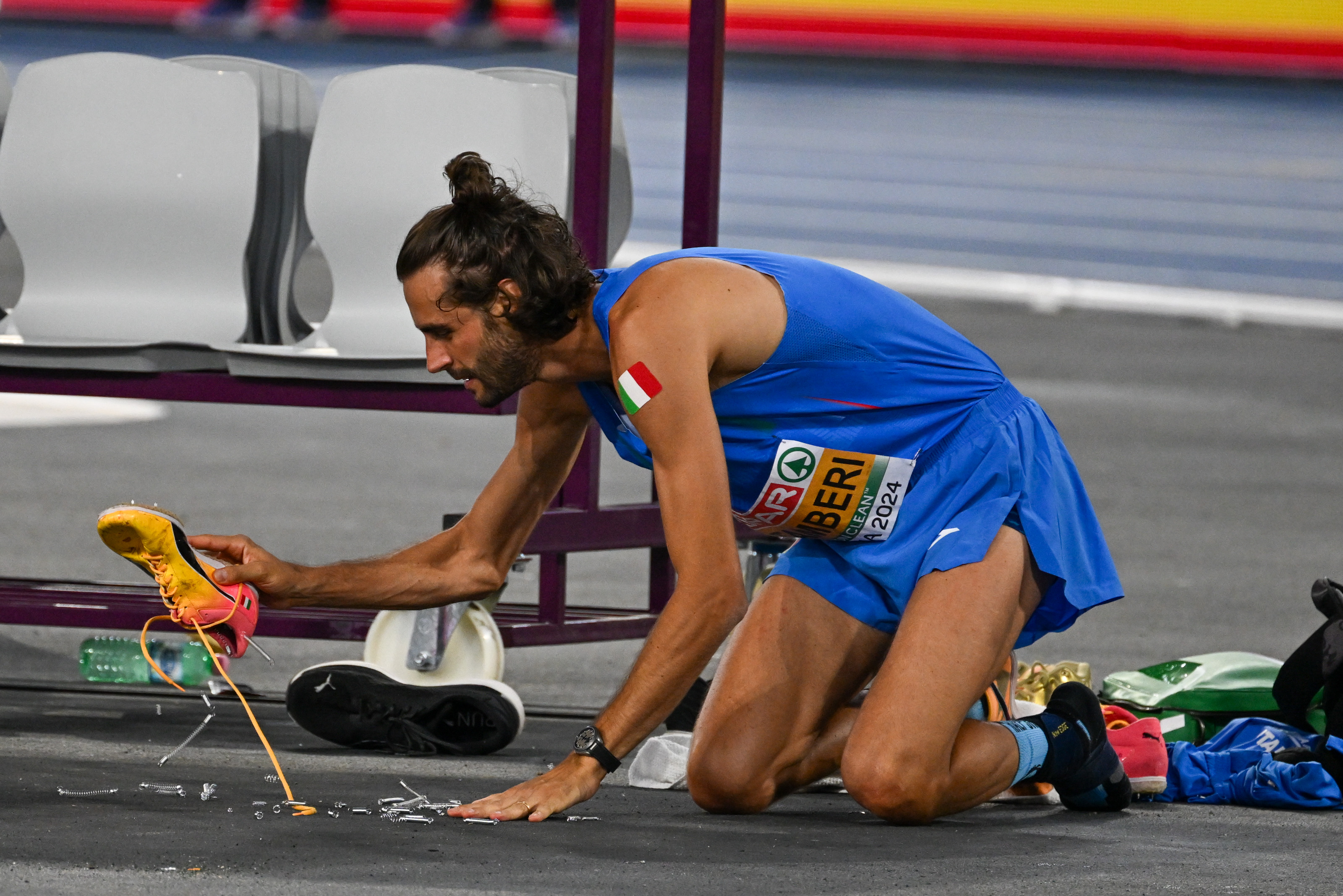
- Gianmarco Tamberi takes springs from his shoes pretending he used it as an advantage.
- Venue: Stadio Olimpico
- Location: Rome
- Dates: 9 June (qualification); 11 June (final)
- Competitors: 27 from 17 nations
- Winning height: 2.37

Medalists
gold medal	Gianmarco Tamberi	Italy
silver medal	Vladyslav Lavskyy	Ukraine
bronze medal	Oleh Doroshchuk	Ukraine

The men's high jump at the 2024 European Athletics Championships took place at the Stadio Olimpico on 9 and 11 June.

== Records ==
Standing records prior to the 2024 European Athletics Championships
World record	Javier Sotomayor (CUB)	2.45 m	Salamanca, Spain	27 July 1993
European record	Patrik Sjöberg (SWE)	2.42 m	Stockholm, Sweden	30 July 1987
European record	Carlo Thränhardt (FRG)	2.42 m	West Berlin, West Germany	26 February 1988
Championship record	Andrey Silnov (RUS)	2.36 m	Gothenburg, Sweden	9 August 2006
World Leading	Hamish Kerr (AUS)	2.36 m	Glasgow, Great Britain	3 March 2024
Europe Leading	Danil Lysenko (RUS)	2.33 m	Moscow, Russia	28 January 2024

== Schedule ==
Date	Time	Round
9 June 2024	11:35	Qualification
11 June 2024	20:35	Final

All times are local times (UTC+2)

== Results ==
=== Qualification ===
Qualification: 2.28 m (Q) or best 12 performances (q).

Rank	Group	Name	Nationality	2.07	2.12	2.17	2.21	2.25	2.28	Result	Notes
1	A	Gianmarco Tamberi	Italy	-	-	-	o			2.21	q, SB
1	A	Yonathan Kapitolnik	Israel	o	o	o	o			2.21	q
1	B	Norbert Kobielski	Poland	-	o	o	o			2.21	q
1	B	Thomas Carmoy	Belgium	-	o	o	o			2.21	q
1	B	Tihomir Ivanov	Bulgaria	-	o	o	o			2.21	q
1	B	Jan Štefela	Czech Republic	-	o	o	o			2.21	q
1	A	Oleh Doroshchuk	Ukraine	o	o	o	o			2.21	q
1	B	Stefano Sottile	Italy	o	o	o	o			2.21	q
1	A	Manuel Lando	Italy	-	o	o	o			2.21	q
10	A	Vladyslav Lavskyy	Ukraine	xo	o	o	o			2.21	q
10	B	Douwe Amels	Netherlands	-	o	xo	o			2.21	q
12	A	Mateusz Przybylko	Germany	-	o	o	xxo			2.21	q
13	A	Alperen Acet	Turkey	-	o	xo	xxo			2.21	q
14	A	Marek Bahník	Czech Republic	o	o	o	xxx			2.17	
14	A	Antonios Merlos	Greece	o	o	o	xxx			2.17	
14	B	Vasilios Konstantinou	Cyprus	o	o	o	xxx			2.17	SB
14	B	Dmytro Nikitin	Ukraine	o	o	o	xxx			2.17	
18	B	Melwin Lycke Holm	Sweden	o	xo	o	xxx			2.17	
19	A	Mateusz Kołodziejski	Poland	o	xxo	o	xxx			2.17	
20	B	Marco Fassinotti	Italy	-	o	xo	xxx			2.17	
20	A	Dániel Jankovics	Hungary	o	o	xo	xxx			2.17	
22	B	Arttu Mattila	Finland	o	o	xxx				2.12	
22	B	Slavko Stević	Serbia	o	o	xxx				2.12	
24	B	Juozas Baikštys	Lithuania	xo	xo	xxx				2.12	
25	B	Péter Bakosi	Hungary	o	xxx					2.07	
25	A	Fabian Delryd	Sweden	o	xxx					2.07	
	A	Jonas Wagner	Germany							DNS	

=== Final ===
Rank	Name	Nationality	2.17	2.22	2.26	2.29	2.31	2.33	2.34	2.37	2.39	2.41	Result	Notes
1st place, gold medalist(s)	Gianmarco Tamberi	Italy	-	o	xo	xxo	o	xx-	o	o	r		2.37	CR WL
2nd place, silver medalist(s)	Vladyslav Lavskyy	Ukraine	o	xxo	o	o	x-	xx					2.29	=PB
3rd place, bronze medalist(s)	Oleh Doroshchuk	Ukraine	o	xxo	o	xxx							2.26	
4	Thomas Carmoy	Belgium	o	xo	xo	xxx							2.26	SB
5	Jan Štefela	Czech Republic	o	o	xxo	xxx							2.26	
6	Stefano Sottile	Italy	o	o	xxx								2.22	
6	Norbert Kobielski	Poland	o	o	xxx								2.22	
6	Manuel Lando	Italy	o	o	xxx								2.22	
6	Tihomir Ivanov	Bulgaria	o	o	xxx								2.22	
10	Alperen Acet	Turkey	xxo	xo	xxx								2.22	
11	Douwe Amels	Netherlands	o	xxx									2.17	
12	Yonathan Kapitolnik	Israel	xo	xxx									2.17	
12	Mateusz Przybylko	Germany	xo	xr-									2.17	
