= 2025 European Athletics Indoor Championships – Men's high jump =

Men's high jump at the 2025 European Athletics Indoor Championships
- Venue: Omnisport Apeldoorn
- Location: Apeldoorn, Netherlands
- Dates: 6 March 2025 (qualification); 8 March 2025 (final)
- Competitors: 18 from 13 nations
- Winning mark: 2.34 WL, PB

Medalists
gold medal	Oleh Doroshchuk	Ukraine
silver medal	Jan Štefela	Czech Republic
bronze medal	Matteo Sioli	Italy

The men's high jump at the 2025 European Athletics Indoor Championships was held on the short track of Omnisport in Apeldoorn, Netherlands, on 6 and 8 March 2025. This was the 38th time the event is contested at the European Athletics Indoor Championships. Athletes can qualify by achieving the entry standard or by their World Athletics Ranking in the event.

The qualifying round was scheduled for 6 March during the morning session. The final was scheduled for 8 March during the evening session.

== Background ==
The men's high jump was contested 37 times before 2025, held every time since the first edition of the European Athletics Indoor Championships (1970–2023). The 2025 European Athletics Indoor Championships will be held in Omnisport Apeldoorn in Apeldoorn, Netherlands. The removable indoor athletics track was retopped for these championships in September 2024.

Javier Sotomayor is the world record holder in the event, with a height of 2.43 m, set in 1989. Carlo Thränhardt is the European record holder, with a height of 2.42 m, set in 1988. The championship record was set at the 2005 championships by Stefan Holm.

Records before the 2025 European Athletics Indoor Championships
Record	Athlete (nation)	Height (m)	Location	Date
World record	Javier Sotomayor (CUB)	2.43	Budapest, Hungary	4 March 1989
European record	Carlo Thränhardt (FRG)	2.42	Berlin, West Germany	26 February 1988
Championship record	Stefan Holm (SWE)	2.40	Madrid, Spain	6 March 2005
World leading	Oleh Doroshchuk (UKR)	2.32	Kyiv, Ukraine	22 February 2025
European leading	Oleh Doroshchuk (UKR)	2.32	Kyiv, Ukraine	22 February 2025

== Qualification ==
For the men's high jump, the qualification period runs from 25 February 2024 until 23 February 2025. Athletes can qualify by achieving the entry standards of 2.30 m or by virtue of their World Athletics Ranking for the event. There is a target number of 18 athletes.

== Rounds ==
=== Qualification ===
The qualifying round was held on 6 March, starting at 18:20 (UTC+1) in the evening. Qualification rule: All athletes meeting the Qualification Standard (Q) of 2.26 m or at least 8 best performers (q) advance to the Final.

Results of the qualification round
Rank	Athlete	Nation	2.08	2.13	2.18	2.23	2.26	Result	Notes	PB
1	Manuel Lando	Italy	–	o	o	o		2.23	q	2.26
2	Oleh Doroshchuk	Ukraine	o	o	xo	o		2.23	q	2.32
2	Matteo Sioli	Italy	–	o	xo	o		2.23	q	2.28
4	Jan Štefela	Czech Republic	–	–	o	xo		2.23	q	2.30
5	Daniel Kosonen	Finland	o	xo	o	xxo		2.23	q, SB	2.24
5	Dmytro Nikitin	Ukraine	o	o	xo	xxo		2.23	q	2.28
7	Alperen Acet	Turkey	o	o	o	xxx		2.18	q, =SB	2.30
8	Tobias Potye	Germany	o	xxo	o	xxx		2.18	q	2.34
9	Eugenio Meloni	Italy	o	o	xo	xxx		2.18		2.21
10	Tihomir Ivanov	Bulgaria	–	xo	xo	xxx		2.18		2.31
10	Vadym Kravchuk	Ukraine	o	xo	xo	xxx		2.18		2.25
12	Thomas Carmoy	Belgium	–	xxo	xo	xxx		2.18		2.29
13	Antonios Merlos	Greece	o	o	xxo	xxx		2.18		2.24
14	Dániel Jankovics	Hungary	o	xo	xxo	xxx		2.18		2.24
15	Douwe Amels	Netherlands	o	o	xxx			2.13		2.31
16	Melwin Lycke Holm	Sweden	xo	o	xxx			2.13		2.20
16	Yonathan Kapitolnik	Israel	xo	o	xxx			2.13		2.31
18	Fabian Delryd	Sweden	o	xxo	xxx			2.13		2.33

=== Final ===
The final was held on 8 March, starting at 20:09 (UTC+1) in the evening.

Results of the final
Rank	Athlete	Nation	2.17	2.22	2.26	2.29	2.32	2.34	Result	Notes
1st place, gold medalist(s)	Oleh Doroshchuk	Ukraine	o	o	o	o	o	o	2.34	WL, PB
2nd place, silver medalist(s)	Jan Štefela	Czech Republic	o	o	xxo	o	xx–	x	2.29	
3rd place, bronze medalist(s)	Matteo Sioli	Italy	o	o	xxo	xo	xxx		2.29	PB
4	Manuel Lando	Italy	o	o	o	xx–	x		2.26	=PB
5	Dmytro Nikitin	Ukraine	o	xo	o	xxx			2.26	
6	Tobias Potye	Germany	o	xxx					2.17	
7	Alperen Acet	Turkey	xxo	xxx					2.17	
7	Daniel Kosonen	Finland	xxo	xxx					2.17	
