= Athletics at the 2022 Asian Games – Men's high jump =

Men's high jump at the 2022 Asian Games
- Venue: Hangzhou Olympic Expo Main Stadium
- Date: 2–4 October 2023
- Competitors: 17 from 12 nations

Medalists
gold medal	Mutaz Barsham	Qatar
silver medal	Woo Sang-hyeok	South Korea
bronze medal	Tomohiro Shinno	Japan

The men's high jump competition at the 2022 Asian Games took place on 2 and 4 October 2023 at the HOC Stadium, Hangzhou.

== Schedule ==
All times are China Standard Time (UTC+08:00)

Date	Time	Event
Monday, 2 October 2023	09:10	Qualification
Wednesday, 4 October 2023	19:00	Final

== Records ==
Prior to this competition, the existing world, Asian and Games records were as follows.

World Record	Javier Sotomayor (CUB)	2.45	Salamanca, Spain	27 July 1993
Asian Record	Mutaz Barsham (QAT)	2.43	Brussels, Belgium	5 September 2014
Games Record	Mutaz Barsham (QAT)	2.35	Incheon, South Korea	29 September 2014

== Results ==
Legend

- DNS — Did not start

=== Qualification ===
- Qualification: Qualifying performance 2.26 (Q) or at least 12 best performers (q) advance to the final.

Rank	Group	Athlete	Attempt					Result	Notes
Rank	Group	Athlete	1.90	2.00	2.10	2.15	2.19	Result	Notes
1	A	Mutaz Barsham (QAT)	–	–	–	–	O	2.19	q
2	A	Ryoichi Akamatsu (JPN)	–	–	O	O		2.15	q
2	A	Fu Chao-hsuan (TPE)	–	–	O	O		2.15	q
2	A	Tawan Kaeodam (THA)	–	O	O	O		2.15	q
2	B	Tomohiro Shinno (JPN)	–	–	O	O		2.15	q
2	B	Woo Sang-hyeok (KOR)	–	–	–	O		2.15	q
7	B	Kampton Kam (SGP)	–	O	O	XXO		2.15	q
8	A	Choi Jin-woo (KOR)	–	O	XO	XXO		2.15	q
9	B	Majdeddin Ghazal (SYR)	–	–	O	XXX		2.10	q
9	A	Jesse Sandesh (IND)	–	O	O	XXX		2.10	q
9	B	Sarvesh Kushare (IND)	–	O	O	XXX		2.10	q
12	A	Sharoz Khan (PAK)	–	O	XO	XXX		2.10	q
13	A	Michael Kennelly (HKG)	O	O	XXO	XXX		2.10	
13	B	Wang Zhen (CHN)	–	O	XXO	XXX		2.10	
15	A	Yan Chan (CAM)	O	XXX				1.90	
16	B	Kobsit Sitthichai (THA)	XO	XXX				1.90	
—	B	Hsiang Chun-hsien (TPE)						DNS	

=== Final ===
Rank	Athlete	Attempt										Result	Notes
Rank	Athlete	2.00	2.10	2.15	2.19	2.23	2.26	2.29	2.31	2.33	2.35	Result	Notes
Rank	Athlete	2.37										Result	Notes
1st place, gold medalist(s)	Mutaz Barsham (QAT)	–	–	–	O	O	O	O	O	O	O	2.35	=GR
1st place, gold medalist(s)	Mutaz Barsham (QAT)	XXX										2.35	=GR
2nd place, silver medalist(s)	Woo Sang-hyeok (KOR)	–	–	O	O	O	O	O	O	O	X–	2.33	
2nd place, silver medalist(s)	Woo Sang-hyeok (KOR)	XX										2.33	
3rd place, bronze medalist(s)	Tomohiro Shinno (JPN)	–	–	O	XO	XO	O	O	XXX			2.29	
4	Sarvesh Kushare (IND)	–	O	O	O	XXO	XO	XXX				2.26	
5	Tawan Kaeodam (THA)	O	O	O	O	O	XXO	XXX				2.26	
6	Ryoichi Akamatsu (JPN)	–	–	–	O	XXX						2.19	
6	Fu Chao-hsuan (TPE)	–	–	O	O	XXX						2.19	
6	Majdeddin Ghazal (SYR)	–	O	O	O	XXX						2.19	
9	Jesse Sandesh (IND)	–	O	O	XXO	XXX						2.19	
10	Choi Jin-woo (KOR)	–	O	O	XXX							2.15	
11	Kampton Kam (SGP)	O	O	XXO	XXX							2.15	
12	Sharoz Khan (PAK)	O	XO	XXX								2.10	
