= 2026 World Athletics Ultimate Championship – Men's high jump =

Men's high jump at the 2026 World Athletics Ultimate Championship
- Venue: National Athletics Centre
- Location: Budapest, Hungary
- Dates: 13 September 2026 (final)
- Competitors: 8 from 7 nations
- Winning time: 2.37 m

Champion
- Gianmarco Tamberi; Italy

The men's high jump was held as a straight final at the 2026 World Athletics Ultimate Championship at the National Athletics Centre in Budapest, Hungary on 13 September 2026. It was the first time the World Ultimate Championship is held. Athletes qualified by wildcard or by their world ranking.

== Background ==
Global records before the 2026 World Athletics Ultimate Championship
Record	Height	Athlete (nation)	Location	Date
World record	2.45 m	Javier Sotomayor (CUB)	Salamanca, Spain	27 July 1993
World lead	2.34 m	JuVaughn Harrison (USA)	Fontvieille, Monaco	5 August 2026

Area records before the 2026 World Athletics Ultimate Championship
Record	Height	Athlete (nation)	Location	Date
African record	2.38 m	Jacques Freitag (RSA)	Oudtshoorn, South Africa	5 March 2005
Asian record	2.43 m	Mutaz Barsham (QAT)	Brussels, Belgium	5 September 2014
European record	2.42 m	Patrik Sjöberg (SWE)	Stockholm, Sweden	30 June 1987
European record	2.42 m	Carlo Thränhardt (FRG)	Berlin, West Germany i	26 February 1988
North, Central American, and Caribbean record	2.45 m	Javier Sotomayor (CUB)	Salamanca, Spain	27 July 1993
Oceanian record	2.36 m	Tim Forsyth (AUS)	Melbourne, Australia	2 March 1997
Oceanian record	2.36 m	Brandon Starc (AUS)	Eberstadt, Germany	26 August 2018
Oceanian record	2.36 m	Hamish Kerr (NZL)	Glasgow, United Kingdom i	3 March 2024
Oceanian record	2.36 m	Hamish Kerr (NZL)	Paris, France	10 August 2024
Oceanian record	2.36 m	Hamish Kerr (NZL)	Tokyo, Japan	16 September 2025
South American record	2.33 m	Gilmar Mayo (COL)	Pereira, Colombia	17 October 1994

== Qualification ==
For the high jump, eight athletes qualified, up to three by wildcard for winners of the event at the 2024 Summer Olympic, the 2025 World Athletics Championships, or the 2026 Diamond League final and the others by their position at the World Athletics Rankings for the event on 3 September 2026.

== Results ==
=== Final ===
The final was held on 13 September at 19:04 (UTC+2).

Place	Athlete	Nation	2.17	2.22	2.26	2.30	2.33	2.35	2.37	2.39	2.41	Result	Notes
1st place, gold medalist(s)	Gianmarco Tamberi	Italy	-	o	o	xo	o	o	xo	-	xxx	2.37 m	WL
2	JuVaughn Harrison	United States	o	o	o	xxo	x-	-	x-	x		2.30 m	
3	Erick Portillo	Mexico	o	o	o	xxx						2.26 m	
4	Oleh Doroshchuk	Ukraine	o	o	xo	xxx						2.26 m	
5	Romaine Beckford	Jamaica	xo	o	xo	xxx						2.26 m	
6	Mateusz Kołodziejski	Poland	o	o	xxx							2.22 m	
7	Jan Štefela	Czech Republic	xo	xxx								2.17 m	
7	Tyus Wilson	United States	xo	xxx								2.17 m	
