= 2021 European Athletics U23 Championships – Men's high jump =

Men's high jump at the 2021 European Athletics U23 Championships
- Venue: Kadriorg Stadium, Tallinn
- Dates: 9 and 11 July
- Competitors: 17 from 13 nations
- Winning mark: 2.20

Medalists
gold medal	Jan Štefela	Czech Republic
silver medal	Nathan Ismar	France
silver medal	Manuel Lando	Italy

The men's high jump event at the 2021 European Athletics U23 Championships was held in Tallinn, Estonia, at Kadriorg Stadium on 9 and 11 July.

== Records ==
Prior to the competition, the records were as follows:

European U23 record	Patrik Sjöberg (SWE)	2.42	Stockholm, Sweden	30 June 1987
Championship U23 record	Aleksander Waleriańczyk (POL)	2.36	Bydgoszcz, Poland	20 July 2003

== Results ==
=== Qualification ===
Qualification rule: 2.18 (Q) or the 12 best results (q) qualified for the final.

Rank	Group	Name	Nationality	1.97	2.02	2.07	2.11	2.15	Results	Notes
1	A	Thomas Carmoy	Belgium	–	–	o	o	o	2.15	q
1	A	Daniel Kosonen	Finland	–	o	o	o	o	2.15	q
1	A	Manuel Lando	Italy	–	o	o	o	o	2.15	q
1	A	Vladyslav Lavskyy	Ukraine	–	o	o	o	o	2.15	q
5	B	Oleh Doroshchuk	Ukraine	–	o	o	xo	o	2.15	q
5	A	Nathan Ismar	France	–	–	xo	o	o	2.15	q
5	B	Arttu Mattila	Finland	–	xo	o	o	o	2.15	q
5	B	Jan Štefela	Czech Republic	–	o	o	xo	o	2.15	q
9	B	Florian Hörnig	Germany	–	o	o	xo	xo	2.15	q
10	B	Maxime Dubiez	France	–	–	xxo	o	xo	2.15	q
11	A	Joel Khan	Great Britain	–	–	o	o	xxo	2.15	q
11	B	Slavko Stević	Serbia	–	o	o	o	xxo	2.15	q
13	B	Gerson Baldé	Portugal	–	–	o	o	xxx	2.11	
13	B	Ruslan Karatkevich	Belarus	–	o	o	o	xxx	2.11	
13	A	Hendrik Lillemets	Estonia	–	o	o	o	xxx	2.11	SB
16	A	Marek Bahník	Czech Republic	–	o	xo	o	xxx	2.11	
17	A	Augustas Bukauskas	Lithuania	xo	xo	xxx			2.02	

=== Final ===
Rank	Name	Nationality	2.10	2.14	2.17	2.20	2.23	Result	Notes
1st place, gold medalist(s)	Jan Štefela	Czech Republic	xo	xo	o	o	xr	2.20	PB
2nd place, silver medalist(s)	Nathan Ismar	France	o	o	o	xxx		2.17	
2nd place, silver medalist(s)	Manuel Lando	Italy	o	o	o	xxx		2.17	PB
4	Joel Khan	Great Britain	o	o	xo	xxx		2.17	
5	Oleh Doroshchuk	Ukraine	o	o	xxx			2.14	
5	Florian Hörnig	Germany	o	o	xx–	x		2.14	
5	Vladyslav Lavskyy	Ukraine	o	o	x–	xx		2.14	
8	Slavko Stević	Serbia	o	xxo	xx–	x		2.14	
9	Thomas Carmoy	Belgium	o	xxx				2.10	
9	Daniel Kosonen	Finland	o	xxx				2.10	
11	Arttu Mattila	Finland	xo	xxx				2.10	
12	Maxime Dubiez	France	xxo	xxx				2.10	
