= Athletics at the 2026 Commonwealth Games – Men's high jump =

Men's high jump at the 2026 Commonwealth Games
- Venue: Scotstoun Stadium, Glasgow
- Dates: 27 July 2026 (final)
- Competitors: 17 from 13 nations
- Winning height: 2.25 m

Medalists
gold medal	Romaine Beckford	Jamaica
silver medal	Sarvesh Kushare	India
bronze medal	Kimani Jack	England

The men's high jump at the 2026 Commonwealth Games, as part of the athletics programme, was held in the Scotstoun Stadium on the evening of 27 July 2026, and was a straight final.

== Records ==
Prior to this competition, the existing world, Commonwealth and Commonwealth Games records were as follows:

Men's High jump
World record	2.45 m	Javier Sotomayor (CUB)	27 Jul 1993	Salamanca, Spain
Commonwealth record	2.40 m	Derek Drouin (CAN)	25 Apr 2014	Des Moines, United States
Games record	2.36 m	Clarence Saunders (BER)	1 Feb 1990	Auckland New Zealand

== Schedule ==
The schedule for the straight final is as follows:

Date	Time	Round
27 July 2026	18:30	Final

All times are British Summer Time (UTC+1)

== Results ==
=== Final ===
The stand alone final is scheduled for the evening session of 27 July 2026.

Rank	Name	1.75	1.85	1.90	1.95	2.00	2.05	2.10	2.15	2.20	2.25	2.28	Result	Notes
1st place, gold medalist(s)	Romaine Beckford (JAM)	–	–	–	–	–	o	o	o	xo	o	xxx	2.25	
2nd place, silver medalist(s)	Sarvesh Kushare (IND)	–	–	–	–	–	o	o	o	o	xxo	xxx	2.25	
3rd place, bronze medalist(s)	Kimani Jack (ENG)	–	–	–	–	–	–	xo	o	o	x-	xx	2.20	
4	Raymond Richards (JAM)	–	–	–	–	–	–	o	xo	xxo	xxx		2.20	
5	Adarsh Ram (IND)	–	–	–	–	–	–	o	o	xxx			2.15	
6	Donald Thomas (BAH)	–	–	–	o	–	xxo	xo	xxx				2.10	
7	Yual Reath (AUS)	–	–	–	–	–	o	xxo	xxx				2.10	
8	Kampton Kam (SGP)	–	o	–	o	o	o	xxx					2.05	
9	Rusiate Matai (FIJ)	–	–	o	–	xo	o	xxx					2.05	SB
10	Regan Corrin (IOM)	–	–	–	o	xo	xo	xxx					2.05	
11	Dezardin Prosper (MRI)	–	–	o	xxo	o	xxx						2.00	
12	Kemboi Kiprop (KEN)	–	o	o	o	xxo	xxx						2.00	
12	J'Quan Samuels (AIA)	–	–	–	o	xxo	xxx						2.00	
14	Samasoni Hewitt (COK)	–	–	xo	xxx								1.90	
NM	Johniff Gumbs (AIA)	–	–	–	xxr								NM	
NM	Tharindu Dasun (SRI)	–	–	–	–	–	xxx						NM	
NM	Tejaswin Shankar (IND)	–	–	–	–	–	xr						NM	
