= 2021 European Athletics Indoor Championships – Men's high jump =

The men's high jump event at the 2021 European Athletics Indoor Championships was held on 4 March at 19:00 (qualification) and 7 March at 11:25 (final) local time.

== Medalists ==
Gold	Silver	Bronze
Maksim Nedasekau; Belarus	Gianmarco Tamberi; Italy	Thomas Carmoy; Belgium

== Records ==
Standing records prior to the 2021 European Athletics Indoor Championships
World record	Javier Sotomayor (CUB)	2.43	Budapest, Hungary	4 March 1989
European record	Carlo Thränhardt (FRG)	2.42	Berlin, West Germany	26 February 1988
Championship record	Stefan Holm (SWE)	2.40	Madrid, Spain	6 March 2005
World Leading	Gianmarco Tamberi (ITA)	2.35	Ancona, Italy	21 February 2021
European Leading	Gianmarco Tamberi (ITA)	2.35	Ancona, Italy	21 February 2021

== Results ==
=== Qualification ===
Qualification: Qualifying performance 2.28 (Q) or at least 8 best performers (q) advance to the Final.

Rank	Athlete	Nationality	2.04	2.10	2.16	2.21	2.25	2.28	Result	Note
1	Maksim Nedasekau	Belarus	–	–	o	o			2.21	q
1	Gianmarco Tamberi	Italy	–	–	o	o			2.21	q
3	Mateusz Przybylko	Germany	–	o	xo	o			2.21	q
4	Adrijus Glebauskas	Lithuania	–	o	o	xo			2.21	q
4	Dmytro Nikitin	Ukraine	–	o	o	xo			2.21	q
6	Tobias Potye	Germany	–	o	xo	xo			2.21	q
7	Thomas Carmoy	Belgium	–	o	o	xxo			2.21	q
8	Dániel Jankovics	Hungary	o	xo	o	xxo			2.21	q
9	Oleh Doroshchuk	Ukraine	o	o	o	xxx			2.16	
9	Tihomir Ivanov	Bulgaria	–	–	o	xxx			2.16	
11	Jonas Wagner	Germany	–	xo	o	xxx			2.16	
12	Daniel Kosonen	Finland	xxo	o	o	xxx			2.16	
13	Joel Khan	Great Britain	–	xxo	xxo	xxx			2.16	
14	Juozas Baikštys	Lithuania	–	o	xxx				2.10	

=== Final ===
Rank	Athlete	Nationality	2.10	2.15	2.19	2.23	2.26	2.29	2.31	2.33	2.35	2.37	2.40	Result	Note
1st place, gold medalist(s)	Maksim Nedasekau	Belarus	–	–	o	xo	o	xo	o	o	xx–	o	xxx	2.37	WL, NR
2nd place, silver medalist(s)	Gianmarco Tamberi	Italy	–	–	–	o	o	o	o	xo	xo	xxx		2.35	=SB
3rd place, bronze medalist(s)	Thomas Carmoy	Belgium	o	o	o	xxo	o	xxx						2.26	
4	Tobias Potye	Germany	o	o	xo	o	xo	xxx						2.26	=PB
5	Adrijus Glebauskas	Lithuania	–	o	o	o	xxx							2.23	
5	Dmytro Nikitin	Ukraine	o	o	o	o	xx–	x						2.23	
7	Mateusz Przybylko	Germany	o	o	o	x–	xr							2.19	
8	Dániel Jankovics	Hungary	o	xo	o	xxx								2.19	
