= 2023 European Athletics U23 Championships – Men's high jump =

Men's high jump at the 2023 European Athletics U23 Championships
- Venue: Leppävaara Stadium
- Location: Espoo, Finland
- Dates: 15 July
- Competitors: 14 from 10 nations
- Winning height: 2.22 m

Medalists
gold medal	Ali Eren Ünlü	Turkey
silver medal	Oleh Doroshchuk	Ukraine
silver medal	Roman Petruk	Ukraine

The men's high jump event at the 2023 European Athletics U23 Championships was held in Espoo, Finland, at Leppävaara Stadium on 15 July.

== Records ==
Prior to the competition, the records were as follows:

European U23 record	Patrik Sjöberg (SWE)	2.42	Stockholm, Sweden	30 June 1987
Championship U23 record	Aleksander Waleriańczyk (POL)	2.36	Bydgoszcz, Poland	20 July 2003

== Results ==
Place	Athlete	Nation	2.05	2.10	2.15	2.19	2.22	2.25	Result	Notes
1st place, gold medalist(s)	Ali Eren Ünlü	Turkey	o	xo	xxo	o	xo	xxx	2.22	
2nd place, silver medalist(s)	Roman Petruk	Ukraine	–	o	xo	o	xxx		2.19	
2nd place, silver medalist(s)	Oleh Doroshchuk	Ukraine	xo	o	o	o	xxx		2.19	
4	Arttu Mattila	Finland	–	xo	o	xo	xxx		2.19	SB
5	Jan Štefela	Czech Republic	o	o	o	xxx			2.15	
6	Massimiliano Luiu	Italy	o	o	xo	x–	xx		2.15	
7	Gergely Török	Hungary	o	xo	xo	xxx			2.15	=PB
7	Emir Rovčanin	Serbia	o	xo	xo	xxx			2.15	
9	Oleh Tykul	Ukraine	xxo	o	xxx				2.10	
10	Mateusz Kołodziejski	Poland	o	xxo	xxx				2.10	
10	Nikola Mujanovic	Serbia	o	xxo	xxx				2.10	
12	Lionel Afan Strasser	Austria	o	xxx					2.05	
13	Mátyás Guth	Hungary	xo	xxx					2.05	
—	Jason Bayindoula	France	xxrr						NM	
