= 2023 Asian Athletics Championships – Men's high jump =

Men's high jump at the 2023 Asian Athletics Championships
- Venue: National Stadium
- Location: Bangkok, Thailand
- Dates: 15 July
- Competitors: 9 from 6 nations
- Winning height: 2.28 m

Medalists
gold medal	Woo Sang-hyeok	South Korea
silver medal	Sarvesh Anil Kushare	India
bronze medal	Tawan Kaeodem	Thailand

The men's high jump event at the 2023 Asian Athletics Championships was held on 15 July.

== Records ==
Records before the 2023 Asian Athletics Championships
Record	Athlete (nation)	Height (m)	Location	Date
World record	Javier Sotomayor (CUB)	2.45	Salamanca, Spain	27 July 1993
Asian record	Mutaz Barsham (QAT)	2.43	Brussels, Belgium	5 September 2014
Championship record	Mutaz Barsham (QAT)	2.35	Kobe, Japan	9 July 2011
World leading	Danil Lysenko (RUS)	2.38	Moscow, Russia	29 January 2023
Asian leading	Sanghyeok Woo (KOR)	2.33	Jeongseon, South Korea	25 June 2023

== Results ==
Rank	Name	Nationality	1.95	2.05	2.10	2.15	2.19	2.23	2.26	2.28	2.33	Result	Notes
1st place, gold medalist(s)	Woo Sang-hyeok	South Korea	–	–	–	o	o	o	o	o	xxx	2.28	
2nd place, silver medalist(s)	Sarvesh Anil Kushare	India	–	o	o	o	o	o	xo	xxx		2.26	
3rd place, bronze medalist(s)	Tawan Kaeodem	Thailand	–	o	o	o	xo	o	xo	xxx		2.26	
4	Naoto Hasegawa	Japan	–	–	o	o	xo	xo	xxx			2.23	
5	Ryoichi Akamatsu	Japan	–	–	–	o	xo	xxo	xxx			2.23	
6	Fu Chao-hsuan	Chinese Taipei	–	–	o	o	o	xxx				2.19	
7	Tejaswin Shankar	India	–	xxo	o	xxx						2.10	
8	Michael John Kennelly	Hong Kong	xo	xo	xxx							2.05	
	Saksit Sitthichai	Thailand	xxx									NM	
