= Yonathan Kapitolnik =

Israeli high jumper (born 2002)

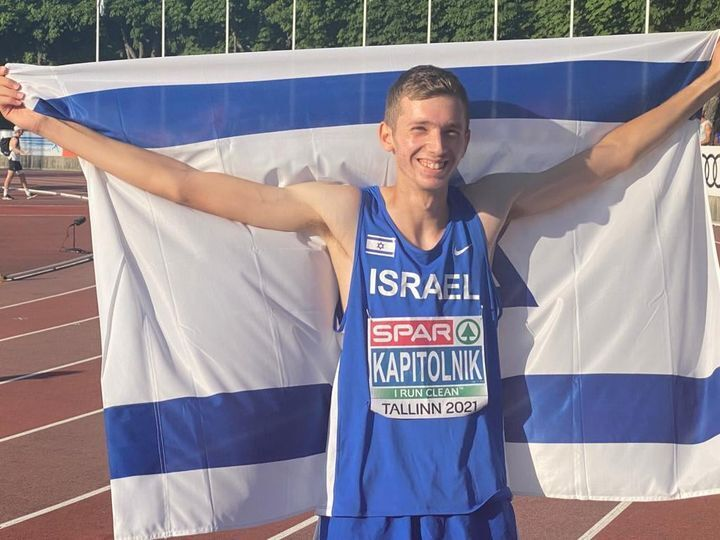
- Kapitolnik after winning the 2021 World Athletics U20 Championships.

Personal information
- Native name: יונתן קפיטולניק
- National team: Israel
- Born: 25 November 2002 (age 23)

Sport
- Event: High jump

Achievements and titles
- Personal bests: Outdoor: 2.30 m (2022); Indoor: 2.31 m (2025)
Medal record
World University Games
Gold medal – first place	2025 Bochum	High jump
World U20 Championships
Gold medal – first place	2021 Nairobi	High jump
European U20 Championships
Gold medal – first place	2021 Tallinn	High jump

Yonathan Kapitolnik (Hebrew: יונתן קפיטולניק; born 25 November 2002) is an Israeli high jumper. He is the 2021 World U20 champion and the 2025 World University Games champion.

== Career ==
Kapitolnik hails from Ganei Tikva. In the age-specific categories, he surpassed the 2 metre mark in 2019 and finished eighth at the 2019 European Youth Summer Olympic Festival. The next year he became Israeli champion, as well as jumping 2.18 metres to win the Israeli U20 championships. In June 2021 he took his second national title, before improving to 2.23 at a local meet. He proceeded to win both the 2021 European U20 Championships, improving to 2.25, and the 2021 World U20 Championships, achieving 2.26 metres.

Already in February 2022, he jumped 2.27 metres indoor in Tatabánya, and in the first outdoor meet of the season in May 2022 he broke the coveted 2.30 barrier. He would not repeat this result throughout the season, though he made his IAAF Diamond League debut at Rome's Golden Gala and Monaco's Herculis, won the Israeli title again, finished fifth at the 2022 Balkan Championships, eleventh at the 2022 World Championships, and lastly competed at the 2022 European Championships without reaching the final.

Kapitolnik then missed 2023 due to injury and solely competed at the Israeli championships, winning it with a 2.10 metre jump. His season's best in 2024 was 2.24 metres; he won his fifth Israeli title in a row and also finished twelfth at the 2024 European Championships.

Kapitolnik's 2.31 jump in Tel Aviv in February 2025 signalled his return to the highest level. After competing unsuccessfully at the 2025 European Indoor Championships, he finished eighth at the 2025 World Indoor Championships, won the 2025 European Team Championships Second Division mene's high jump, finished fourth at the 2025 Herculis and won the gold medal at the 2025 World University Games. Later in the season, after taking his sixth straight Israeli title he was knocked out in the qualifying at the 2025 World Championships.

In 2025, he also enrolled at the University of Illinois to compete for the Illinois Fighting Illini. He recorded modest results on the 2025–26 university indoor circuit, 2.21 being his best result.
