= Bhim Singh (athlete) =

Indian high jumper

Personal information
- Born: 13 April 1945 (age 81) Dhanana, Haryana, India

Sport
- Sport: Athletics
- Event: High jump
Medal record
Men's athletics
Representing India
Asian Games
Gold medal – first place	1966 Bangkok	High jump
Bronze medal – third place	1970 Bangkok	High jump

Bhim Singh (born 13 April 1945) is a former Indian high jump athlete. He won the gold medal in the men's high jump at the 1966 Asian Games and the bronze medal in the same event at the 1970 Asian Games. He also represented India at the 1968 Summer Olympics and the 1970 Commonwealth Games. He served in the Indian Army. He was awarded the Arjuna Award, India's second highest sporting honour, in 1967. The Bhim Singh Stadium in Bhiwani is named after him.
