= 2021 World Athletics U20 Championships – Men's high jump =

Men's high jump at the 2021 World Athletics U20 Championships
- Venue: Kasarani Stadium
- Dates: 21 August
- Competitors: 14 from 13 nations
- Winning height: 2.26 m

Medalists
gold medal	Yonathan Kapitolnik	Israel
silver medal	Massimiliano Luiu	Italy
bronze medal	Mateusz Kołodziejski	Poland

The men's high jump at the 2021 World Athletics U20 Championships was held at the Kasarani Stadium on 21 August.

== Records ==
Standing records prior to the 2021 World Athletics U20 Championships
World U20 Record	Dragutin Topić (YUG)	2.37	Plovdiv, Bulgaria	12 August 1990
World U20 Record	Steve Smith (GBR)	2.37	Seoul, South Korea	20 September 1992
Championship Record	Dragutin Topić (YUG)	2.37	Plovdiv, Bulgaria	12 August 1990
Championship Record	Steve Smith (GBR)	2.37	Seoul, South Korea	20 September 1992
World U20 Leading	Wu Guobiao (CHN)	2.27	Nanjing, China	15 May 2021

== Results ==
=== Final ===
The final was held on 21 August at 15:55.

Rank	Name	Nationality	2.00	2.06	2.10	2.14	2.17	2.19	2.21	2.26	2.31	Mark	Notes
1st place, gold medalist(s)	Yonathan Kapitolnik	Israel	–	o	o	o	o	o	–	o	xxx	2.26	PB
2nd place, silver medalist(s)	Massimiliano Luiu	Italy	o	o	o	o	o	xxx				2.17	PB
3rd place, bronze medalist(s)	Mateusz Kołodziejski	Poland	o	o	o	o	xxo	xxx				2.17	
4	Omamuyovwi Best Erhire	Nigeria	–	o	o	o	xxx					2.14	
5	Brian Raats	South Africa	–	xo	xo	xxo	xxx					2.14	
6	Roman Petruk	Ukraine	–	xo	o	xxx						2.10	
7	Jakub Bělík	Czech Republic	o	xxo	o	xxx						2.10	
8	David Aya	Nigeria	xo	o	xo	xxx						2.10	
9	Martin Mlinarić	Croatia	o	o	xxx							2.06	
9	Sid Markus Imani Varland	Kenya	o	o	xxx							2.06	PB
11	Sandro Jeršin Tomassini	Slovenia	xo	o	xxx							2.06	
12	Kristján Viggó Sigfinnsson	Iceland	–	xo	x-	xx						2.06	PB
13	Sámuel Hodossy-Takács	Hungary	o	xxx								2.00	
	Aiden Grout	Canada	–	xxx								NM	
