= Sarvesh Kushare =

Indian high jumper (born 1995)

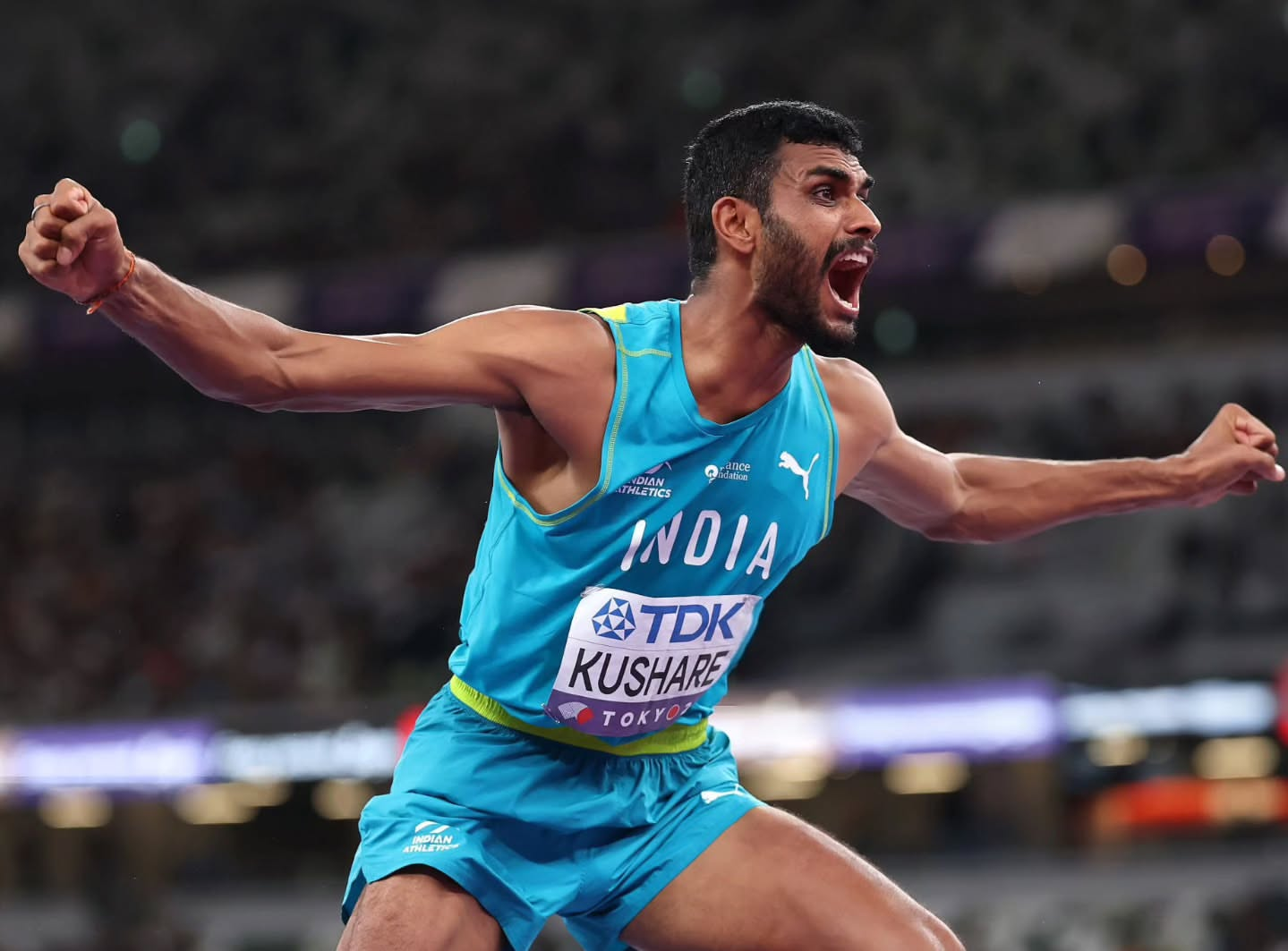
- Kushare at the 2025 World Championships

Personal information
- Full name: Sarvesh Anil Kushare
- Born: 17 June 1995 (age 31) Devargaon, Maharashtra, India
- Height: 1.79 m (5 ft 10 in)
- Military career
- Branch: Indian Army
- Service years: 2016–present
- Rank: Naib Subedar
- Unit: 101 Field Regiment

Achievements and titles
- Personal bests: 2.31 m NR (2026)
Medal record
Men's athletics
Representing India
Asian Games
Silver medal – second place	2026 Aichi–Nagoya	High jump
Asian Championships
Silver medal – second place	2023 Bangkok	High jump
Commonwealth Games
Silver medal – second place	2026 Glasgow	High jump
South Asian Games
Gold medal – first place	2019 Kathmandu	High jump

Sarvesh Anil Kushare (born 17 June 1995) is an Indian high jumper. He has won silver medals at the 2026 Asian Games, 2026 Commonwealth Games and the 2023 Asian Championships.

== Early life ==
Kushare was born on 17 June 1995 in Devargaon village of Maharashtra's Nashik district. The son of an onion farmer, he trained in his early years using makeshift landing pits made of corn husks, cotton and agricultural waste, prepared by his father, who was also his childhood coach. He serves as a Naib Subedar in the 101 Field Regiment of the Indian Army.

== Career ==
Kushare made his international debut at the 2019 South Asian Games in Kathmandu, where he won the gold medal with a jump of 2.21 m, setting the games record.

At the 2023 Asian Indoor Championships in Astana, he placed sixth with a jump of 2.20 m. He won a silver jumping 2.26 m at the 2023 Asian Championships in Bangkok. At the 2023 World Championships in Budapest, he finished 20th among 33 jumpers in the qualification round with a jump of 2.22 m and failed to advance to the final. Later at the Asian Games in Hangzhou, clearing 2.26 m he narrowly missed a medal with a fourth-place finish.

He represented India at the 2024 Paris Olympics, where he finished 25th in the qualification round with a jump 2.15 m and failed to advance to the final.

At the 2025 Asian Championships in Gumi, he finished fifth with a jump of 2.19 m. He became the first Indian high jumper to qualify for the final of the World Championships in the 2025 edition, where he finished sixth with a jump of 2.28 m.

At the 2026 National Inter-State Championships in Bhubaneswar, he set the national record with a jump of 2.31 m, becoming the first Indian to clear the 2.30 m barrier. He became the first Indian high jumper to finish on the podium at a Diamond League meet, claiming third place on his debut at the 2026 Herculis in Monaco with a clearance of 2.26 m, to become only the fourth Indian to record a top-three finish at a Diamond League event. At the 2026 Commonwealth Games in Glasgow, he became the first Indian to win a silver medal in the men's high jump at the Games with a jump of 2.25 m.

== International competitions ==
Representing India
Year	Competition	Host	Position	Result
2019	South Asian Games	Kathmandu, Nepal	1st	2.21 m
2023	Asian Indoor Championships	Astana, Kazakhstan	6th	2.20 m
2023	Asian Championships	Bangkok, Thailand	2nd	2.26 m
2023	World Championships	Budapest, Hungary	20th (Q)	2.22 m
2023	Asian Games	Hangzhou, China	4th	2.26 m
2024	Olympic Games	Paris, France	25th (Q)	2.15 m
2025	Asian Championships	Gumi, South Korea	5th	2.19 m
2025	World Championships	Tokyo, Japan	6th	2.28 m
2026	Commonwealth Games	Glasgow, Scotland	2nd	2.25 m
2026	Asian Games	Nagoya, Japan	2nd	2.25 m
