= Thomas Carmoy =

Belgian high jumper (born 2000)

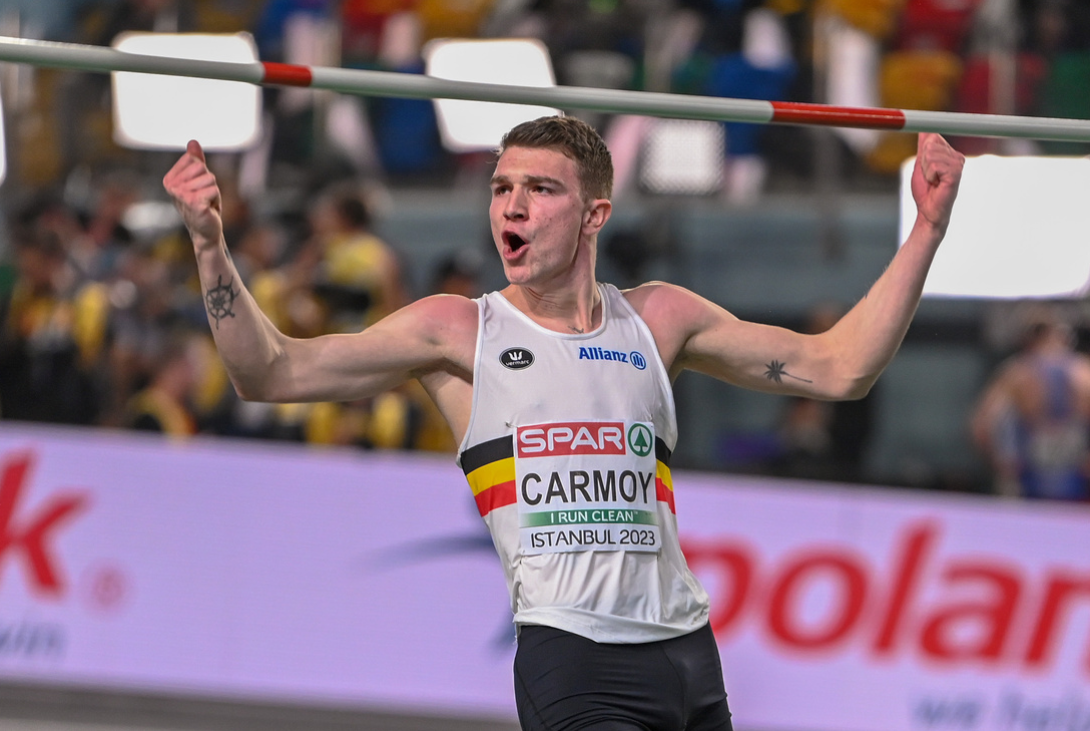
- Carmoy in 2023

Personal information
- Born: 16 February 2000 (age 26) Charleroi, Belgium

Sport
- Country: Belgium
- Sport: Athletics
- Event: High jump
- Coached by: Marc Muryn
Medal record
Men's high jump
Representing Belgium
European Games
Silver medal – second place	2023 Kraków-Małopolska	High jump
European Indoor Championships
Bronze medal – third place	2021 Toruń	High jump
Bronze medal – third place	2023 Istanbul	High jump
Military World Games
Bronze medal – third place	2019 Wuhan	High jump

Thomas Carmoy (born 16 February 2000) is a Belgian high jumper. In 2019, he won the bronze medal in his event at the Military World Games held in Wuhan, China. He won bronze medals in the men's high jump at the 2021 European Athletics Indoor Championships held in Toruń, Poland and the 2023 European Athletics Indoor Championships held in Istanbul, Turkey. Carmoy represented Belgium at the 2024 Summer Olympic Games in Paris, France where he failed to qualify for the final, finishing 19th.

== International competitions ==
Year	Competition	Venue	Position	Notes
Representing Belgium
2016	European Youth Championships	Tbilisi, Georgia	6th	2.07 m
2017	European U20 Championships	Grosseto, Italy	7th	2.17 m
2018	World U20 Championships	Tallinn, Estonia	8th	2.19 m
2019	European U20 Championships	Borås, Sweden	1st	2.22 m
2019	Military World Games	Wuhan, China	3rd	2.15 m
2021	European Indoor Championships	Toruń, Poland	3rd	2.26 m
2021	European U23 Championships	Tallinn, Estonia	9th	2.10 m
2022	World Indoor Championships	Belgrade, Serbia	6th	2.28 m
2022	World Championships	Eugene, United States	17th (q)	2.25 m
2022	European Championships	Munich, Germany	5th	2.23 m
2023	European Indoor Championships	Istanbul, Turkey	3rd	2.29 m
2023	European Games	Chorzów, Poland	2nd	2.29 m
2023	World Championships	Budapest, Hungary	15th (q)	2.25 m
2024	World Indoor Championships	Glasgow, United Kingdom	11th	2.15 m
2024	European Championships	Rome, Italy	4th	2.26 m
2024	Olympic Games	Paris, France	19th (q)	2.20 m
2025	European Indoor Championships	Apeldoorn, Netherlands	12th (q)	2.18 m
2025	World Championships	Tokyo, Japan	11th	2.20 m
2026	European Championships	Birmingham, United Kingdom	8th	2.18 m
