= Roman Anastasios =

Australian high jumper (born 2002)

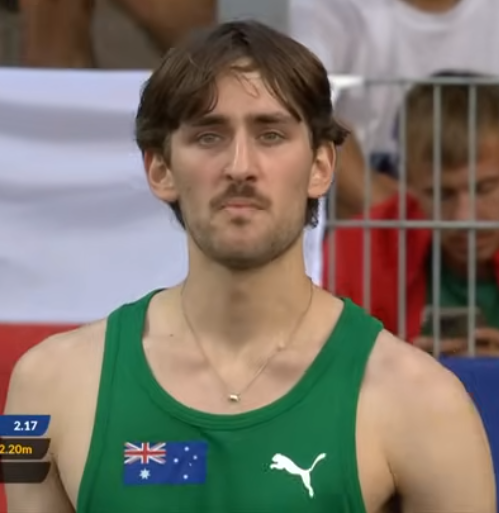
- At the 2025 Summer World University Games

Personal information
- Born: 9 June 2002 (age 24)

Sport
- Sport: Athletics
- Event: High Jump

Achievements and titles
- Personal best: High jump: 2.25 m (2024)
Medal record
Men's athletics
Representing Australia
Oceania Championships
Silver medal – second place	2026 Darwin	High jump
Silver medal – second place	2024 Suva	High jump
World University Games
Bronze medal – third place	2025 Bochum	High jump

Roman Anastasios (born 9 June 2002) is an Australian high jumper. He won the Australian Championships in 2026. He competed at the 2025 World Athletics Championships and won the silver medal at the 2024 Oceania Athletics Championships and the bronze medal at the 2025 Summer World University Games.

== Biography ==
Whilst studying fine arts at the University of Melbourne he won the Australian Unisport Athletics Championships in 2023 and 2024, after which he was named student athlete of the year at the Unisport Awards in 2024. He cleared 2.21 metres to place third at the senior Australian Championships in Adelaide in April 2024. He won the silver medal behind Yual Reath at the 2024 Oceania Athletics Championships in Suva, Fiji, in June 2024 with a personal best jump of 2.25 metres.

Anastasios cleared 2.20 metres to win the inaugural Australian Short Track Championships in Sydney on 1 February 2025. He placed third behind Reath and Brandon Starc at the Australian Athletics Championships in Perth in April 2025 with a clearance of 2.20 metres.

He won the bronze medal in the high jump at the 2025 Summer World University Games in Bochum, Germany in July 2025. He competed for Australia at the 2025 World Athletics Championships in Tokyo, Japan in September 2025.

On 11 April 2026, he won his first national title with a jump of 2.20 m at the 2026 Australian Championships. The following month, he won the silver medal behind Reath at the 2026 Oceania Athletics Championships in Darwin.
