= Tomohiro Shinno =

Japanese high jumper (born 1996)

Personal information
- Born: 17 August 1996 (age 29) Hiroshima, Japan

Sport
- Country: Japan
- Sport: Track and field
- Event: High jump

Achievements and titles
- Personal best: 2.31 m (7 ft 6 3/4 in) (Kumagaya 2020)
Medal record
Men's athletics
Representing Japan
Asian Games
Bronze medal – third place	2022 Hangzhou	High jump
Asian Indoor Championships
Silver medal – second place	2026 Tianjin	High jump

Tomohiro Shinno (真野 友博, Shinno Tomohiro; born 17 August 1996) is a Japanese high jumper. He placed 8th in the final at the 2022 World Championships. He is also a two-time national outdoor champion and one-time indoor champion.

His personal bests in the event are 2.31 m (7 ft 6 3/4 in) outdoors (Kumagaya 2020) and 2.24 m (7 ft 4 in) indoor (Osaka 2021).

== Competition record ==
Year	Competition	Venue	Position	Notes
Representing Japan
2022	World Championships	Eugene, Oregon	8th	2.27 m
2023	World Championships	Budapest, Hungary	31st (q)	2.18 m
2023	Asian Games	Hangzhou, China	3rd	2.29 m
2024	Olympic Games	Paris, France	23rd (q)	2.20 m
2025	Asian Championships	Gumi, South Korea	2nd	2.26 m
2025	World Championships	Tokyo, Japan	14th (q)	2.21 m
2026	Asian Indoor Championships	Tianjin, China	2nd	2.19 m
2026	World Indoor Championships	Toruń, Poland	5th	2.26 m
