= Dániel Jankovics =

Hungarian athlete

Dániel Jankovics (born 1 March 1995) is a Hungarian track and field athlete who competes in the high jump. He holds a personal best of 2.24 metres for the event. He represented his country at the 2021 European Athletics Indoor Championships, finishing eighth. He is a multiple Hungarian national champion, including wins indoors in 2020 and 2021, and outdoors in 2019 and 2020. Earlier in his career he took part in combined track and field events, and completed he octathlon at the 2012 Hungarian under-18s championship.

== International competitions ==
Representing Hungary
Year	Competition	Venue	Position	Event	Notes
2017	European U23 Championships	Bydgoszcz, Poland	10th (q)	High jump	2.11 m
2021	European Indoor Championships	Toruń, Poland	8th	High jump	2.19 m
2024	European Championships	Rome, Italy	20th (q)	High jump	2.17 m
2025	European Indoor Championships	Apeldoorn, Netherlands	14th (q)	High jump	2.18 m

== National titles ==
- Hungarian Athletics Championships
  - High jump: 2019, 2020
- Hungarian Indoor Athletics Championships
  - High jump: 2020, 2021
