= Erick Portillo =

Mexican high jumper (born 2000)

Erick Josué Portillo Rodríguez
Personal information
- Nationality: Mexico
- Born: 5 October 2000 (age 25) Ciudad Cuauhtémoc, Chihuahua, Mexico

Sport
- Sport: Athletics
- Event: High jump

Achievements and titles
- Personal best: High jump: 2.30m (2026)
Medal record
Men's track and field
Representing Mexico
World Indoor Championships
Silver medal – second place	2026 Toruń	High Jump
World Ultimate Championship
Third place	2026 Budapest	High jump
Central American and Caribbean Games
Gold medal – first place	2026 Santo Domingo	High jump
Junior Pan American Games
Gold medal – first place	2021 Cali-Valle	High jump
NACAC U23 Championships
Bronze medal – third place	2019 Querétaro	High jump
Pan American U20 Championships
Gold medal – first place	2019 San José	High jump

Erick Josué Portillo Rodríguez (born 5 October 2000) is a Mexican high jumper. He won the silver medal at the 2026 World Athletics Indoor Championships and placed third at the 2026 World Ultimate Championship. He is a multiple-time national champion and has represented Mexico at multiple major championships, including the 2024 Olympic Games.

== Biography ==
Portillo won the gold medal in the high jump at the 2019 Pan American U20 Athletics Championships in San Jose, Costa Rica with a clearance of 2.18 metres. He won bronze at the 2019 NACAC U23 Champiosnhips.

Portillo won the gold medal at the 2021 Junior Pan American Games in Cali, Colombia with a 2.21 metres clearance. He jumped a personal best 2.28 metres at the Birmingham World Indoor Tour Final in England in February 2023, finishing second to Hamish Kerr.

In July 2024, he cleared 2.27 metres competing in Mexico and qualified for the Olympic Games. He subsequently competed at the 2024 Summer Olympics in Paris.

Portillo was runner-up to Jair Portillo at the 2025 Mexican Championships. He placed fourth at the 2025 Summer World University Games in Germany in July 2025. He finished sixth at the 2025 NACAC Championships in Freeport, The Bahamas in August 2025. In September 2025, he competed at the 2025 World Athletics Championships in Tokyo, Japan.

Portillo jumped 2.25 metres in Hustopeče in February 2026. The following week, he jumped 2.26 metres in Banská Bystrica, Slovakia at the Tipos Banskobystrická latka. He cleared a personal best 2.30 metres to win the silver medal at the 2026 World Athletics Indoor Championships in Poland on 21 March 2026, finishing behind Oleh Doroshchuk of Ukraine. In May, he competed in Poland again and won the high jump with a 2.24m clearance at the Irena Szewińska Memorial. On 4 June, he placed second at the 2026 Golden Gala in Rome, part of the 2026 Diamond League, finishing behind Matteo Sioli of Italy. At the 2026 Diamond League Final in Brussels in September, he placed sixth with 2.21 metres. On 13 September, he placed third at the inaugural World Ultimate Championship in Budapest with a jump of 2.26 metres.

== Personal life ==
He is from Cuauhtémoc, Chihuahua. In 2021, he began to study for a degree in physiotherapy at the Universidad del Valle de México, in Chihuahua. His brother Jair Portillo also competes internationally as a high jumper.
