= Gianmarco Tamberi =

Italian high jumper (born 1992)

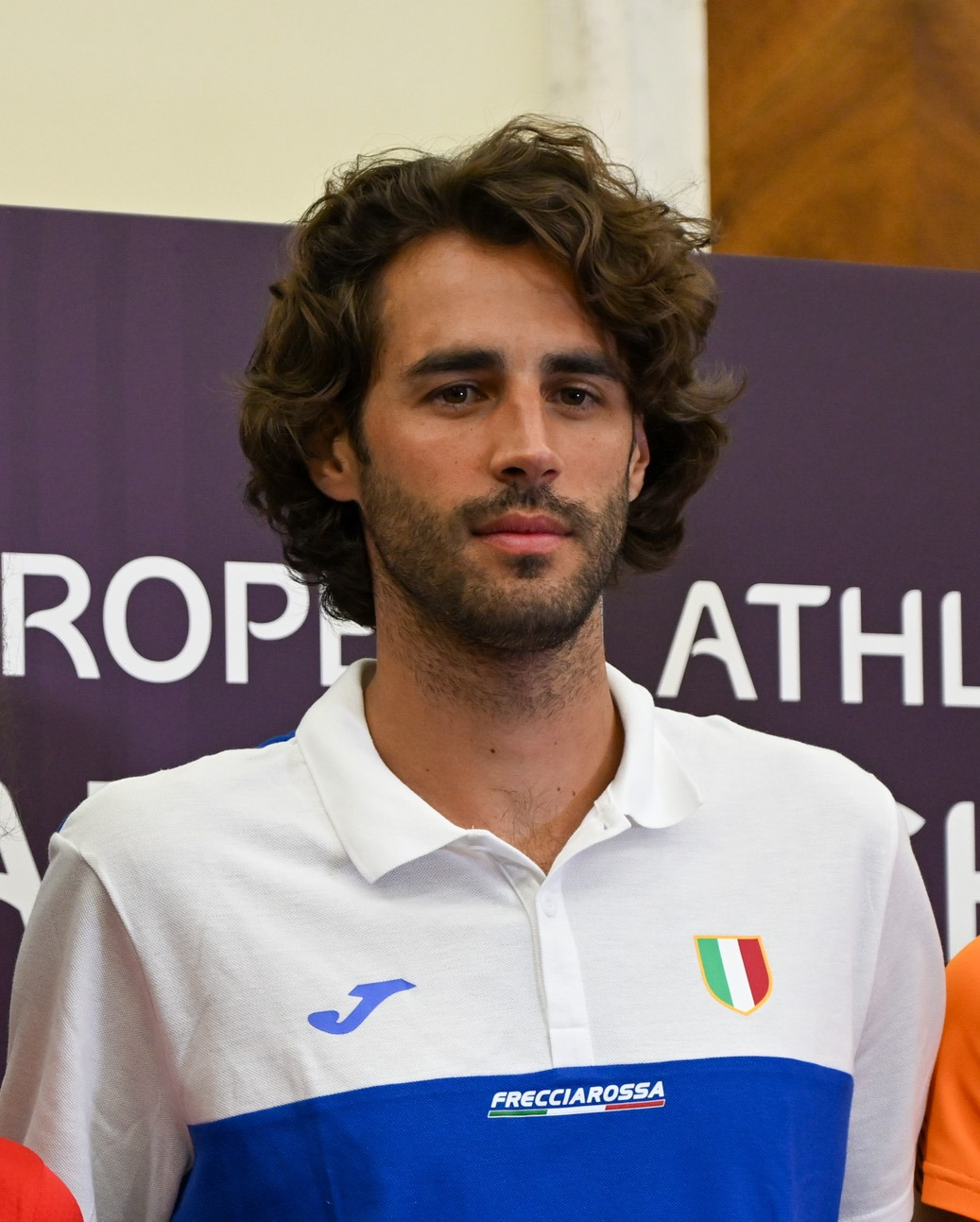
- Tamberi in 2024

Personal information
- National team: Italy
- Born: 1 June 1992 (age 34) Civitanova Marche, Italy
- Height: 1.91 m (6 ft 3 in)
- Weight: 76 kg (168 lb)

Sport
- Sport: Athletics
- Event: High jump
- Club: Atletica Osimo (2002–2009); Atletica Vomano (2010–2011); Fiamme Gialle (2012–2020); Atletica Vomano (2020); ATL-Etica (2021–); Fiamme Oro (2021–)
- Coached by: Marco Tamberi (2011–2022); Giulio Ciotti (2022–)

Achievements and titles
- Olympic finals: 2012 London; High jump – 21st (q); 2020 Tokyo; High jump – Gold
- World finals: 2015 Beijing; High jump – 8th; 2017 London; High jump – 14th (q); 2019 Doha; High jump – 8th; 2022 Eugene; High jump – 4th; 2023 Budapest; High jump – Gold
- Highest world ranking: 1 (weeks 46)
- Personal bests: High jump: 2.39 m NR; High jump indoor: 2.38 m NR
Medal record
Men's athletics
Representing Italy
Top 6 events medals
Event	1st	2nd	3rd
Olympic Games	1	0	0
World Championships	1	0	0
World Ultimate Championships	1	0	0
World Indoor Championships	1	0	1
European Championships	4	0	0
European Indoor Championships	1	1	0
Total	9	1	1
Olympic Games
Gold medal – first place	2020 Tokyo	High jump
World Championships
Gold medal – first place	2023 Budapest	High jump
World Ultimate Championship
First place	2026 Budapest	High jump
World Indoor Championships
Gold medal – first place	2016 Portland	High jump
Bronze medal – third place	2022 Belgrade	High jump
Diamond League
First place	2021	High jump
First place	2022	High jump
First place	2024	High jump
European Championships
Gold medal – first place	2016 Amsterdam	High jump
Gold medal – first place	2022 Munich	High jump
Gold medal – first place	2024 Rome	High jump
Gold medal – first place	2026 Birmingham	High jump
European Indoor Championships
Gold medal – first place	2019 Glasgow	High jump
Silver medal – second place	2021 Toruń	High jump
European Games
Gold medal – first place	2023 Kraków-Małopolska	High jump
Mediterranean Games
Gold medal – first place	2026 Taranto	High jump
European Junior Championships
Bronze medal – third place	2011 Tallinn	High jump

Gianmarco Tamberi (Italian pronunciation: [dʒamˈmarko tamˈbɛːri]; born 1 June 1992) is an Italian high jumper, Olympic champion (2020), World outdoor champion (2023), and European outdoor champion (2016, 2022, 2024 and 2026).

He won the 2021 Diamond League crown, becoming the first ever Italian to do so, and repeated this in 2022 and 2024.

== Career ==
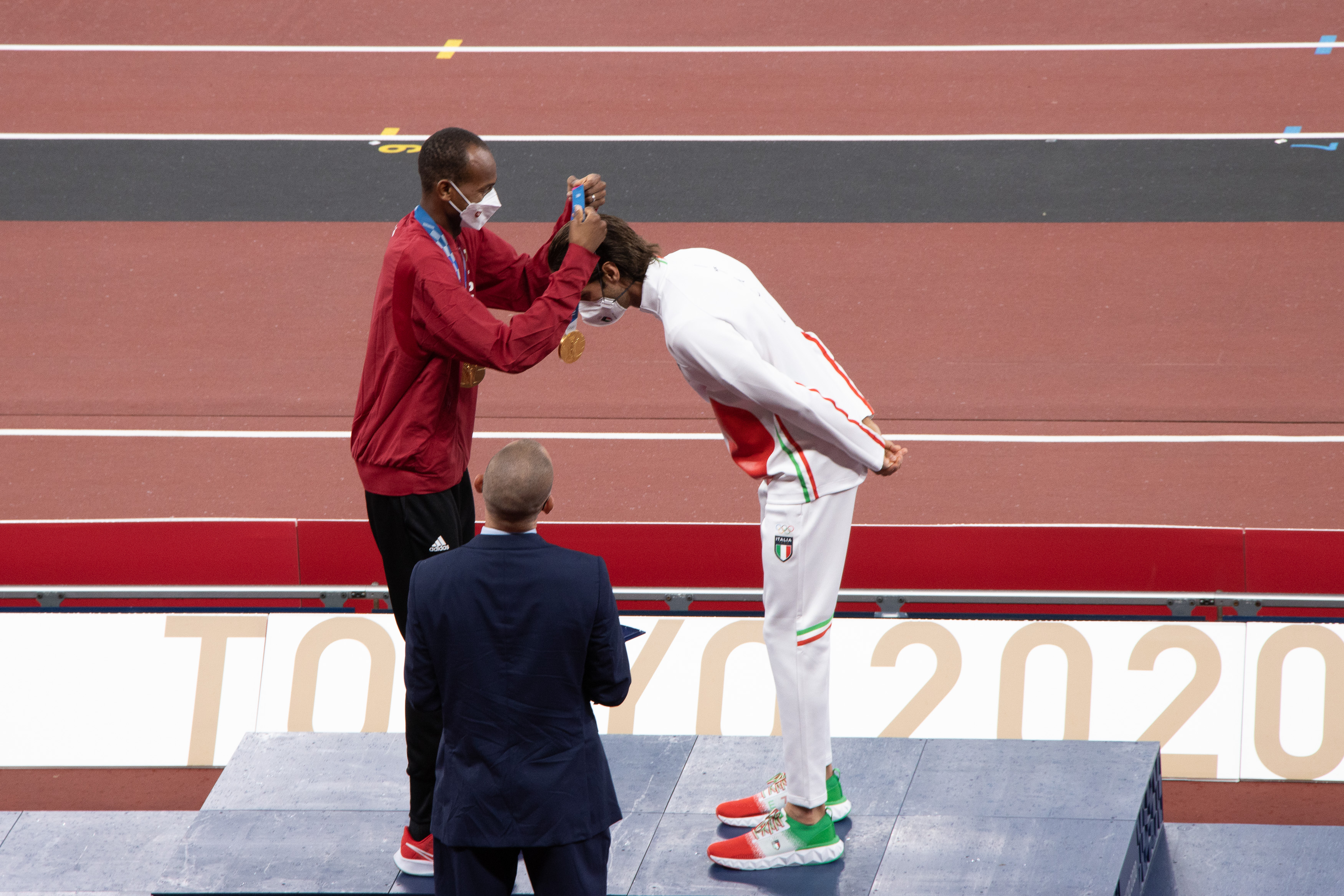
Tamberi with the Gold medal shared at the 2020 Summer Olympics

Until 2022, Tamberi was coached by his father, Marco Tamberi, who held the indoor Italian record in 1983 with a height of 2.28 m.

In 2015, Tamberi broke the Italian high jump record twice—first with a jump of 2.34 m in Cologne, and second with a 2.37 m in Eberstadt, where he was second behind Derek Drouin. He later finished 8th at the 2015 World Championships in Beijing with a clearance of 2.25 m.

During winter 2016, Tamberi won every contest he participated at. He won in Banská Bystrica with 2.35 m, a new Italian indoor record, equalled by Marco Fassinotti in the same event. He won in Třinec after clearing 2.33 m. At the 2016 High Jump Moravia Tour, he recorded a jump of 2.38 m, enough to beat Chris Baker of Great Britain and Kyriakos Ioannou of Cyprus, and which gave him the Italian indoor high jump record. He won a gold medal at the World Indoor Championships in Portland in March 2016 with a jump of 2.36 m.

Tamberi was unable to compete at the 2016 Olympics due to an injury earlier in the season.

At major competitions, he is known for sporting a full beard during qualification and shaving half of it for the final.

On 1 August 2021, he and Qatari athlete Mutaz Essa Barshim were declared tied winners of the men's high jump at the 2020 Summer Olympics after both had cleared 2.37m. Tamberi and Barshim shared the gold medal in a rare instance in Olympic history of athletes of different nations agreeing to share the same medal. After the failed jumps Barshim asked the referee "Can we have two golds?" and when hearing the answer was yes, embraced Tamberi saying "History, my friend".

At the 2022 NBA Celebrity All-Star Game, Tamberi appeared on Dominique Wilkins's team, and made a putback dunk. He was the first high jump champion to appear in the Celebrity Game.

Tamberi won the gold medal at the World Athletics Championships in Budapest, besting America's JuVaughn Harrison on a countback after both cleared the same 2.36 metre height.

On 13 June 2024, Tamberi and Olympic fencer Arianna Errigo received the tricolor flag from the president of Italy, Sergio Mattarella, for the Paris 2024 Olympic Games. He received media attention after accidentally losing his wedding ring in the River Seine during the opening ceremony of the 2024 games.

== Statistics ==
=== National records ===
- High jump outdoor: 2.39 ( Monaco, 15 July 2016) – Current holder
- High jump indoor: 2.38 ( (Czech Republic) Hustopeče, 13 February 2016) – Current holder

=== Progression ===
Best outdoor World ranking of Tamberi was 2nd in 2016, but he was indoor World leader in 2016 and 2021.

Personal Best

Outdoor

Year (age)	Performance	Venue	Date	World Ranking
2026 (34)	2.37 m	(Hungary) Budapest	13 September	1st
2025 (33)	2.20 m	(Germany) Heilbronn	10 August	113rd
2024 (32)	2.37 m	(Italy) Rome	11 June	1st
2023 (31)	2.36 m	(Hungary) Budapest	22 August	2nd
2022 (30)	2.34 m	(Switzerland) Zürich	7 September	3rd
2021 (29)	2.37 m	(Japan) Tokyo	1 August	1st
2020 (28)	2.30 m	(Italy) Ancona	28 June	3rd
2019 (27)	2.28 m	(Italy) Rome	2 October	23rd
2018 (26)	2.33 m	(Germany) Eberstadt	26 August	8th
2017 (25)	2.29 m	(United Kingdom) London	18 August	29th
2016 (24)	2.39 m	Monaco	15 July	2nd
2015 (23)	2.37 m	(Germany) Eberstadt	2 August	3rd
2014 (22)	2.29 m	(Italy) Ancona	27 August	21st
2013 (21)	2,25 m	(Italy) Milan	28 July	52nd
2012 (20)	2.31 m	(Italy) Bressanone	8 July	12th
2011 (19)	2.25 m	(Estonia) Tallinn	23 July	55th
2010 (18)	2.14 m	(Italy) Florence	6 June	–
2009 (17)	2.07 m	(Italy) Bressanone	9 July	–

Indoor

Year (age)	Performance	Venue	Date	World Ranking
2021 (29)	2.35 m	(Italy) Ancona	21 February	1st
2020 (28)	2.31 m	(Italy) Siena	29 February	6th
2019 (27)	2.32 m	(Italy) Ancona	15 February	2nd
2018 (26)	2.25 m	(Czech Republic) Hustopeče	27 January	35th
2017 (25)	he did not play the indoor season			
2016 (24)	2.38 m	(Czech Republic) Hustopeče	13 February	1st
2015 (23)	2.28 m	(Czech Republic) Prague	7 March	23rd
2013 (22)	2.30 m	(Slovakia) Banská Bystrica	6 February	11th
2012 (20)	2.20 m	(Slovakia) Banská Bystrica	8 February	100th
2012 (20)	2.20 m	(Italy) Ancona	8 January	100th
2011 (19)	2.21 m	(Italy) Ancona	13 February	70th
2010 (18)	2.10 m	(Italy) Ancona	6 February	

=== Achievements ===
Year	Competition	Venue	Position	Event	Measure	Notes
2010	World Junior Championships	(Canada) Moncton	21st (q)	High jump	2.10 m	
2011	European Junior Championships	(Estonia) Tallinn	3rd	High jump	2.25 m	PB =
2012	European Championships	(Finland) Helsinki	5th	High jump	2.24 m	(Note: He jumped 2.26 m in qualification.)
2012	Olympic Games	(United Kingdom) London	21st (q)	High jump	2.21 m	
2013	European Indoor Championships	(Sweden) Gothenburg	5th	High jump	2.29 m	
2013	European U23 Championships	(Finland) Tampere	13th (q)	High jump	2.17 m	
2014	European Championships	(Switzerland) Zürich	7th	High jump	2.26 m	SB
2015	European Indoor Championships	(Czech Republic) Prague	7th	High jump	2.24 m	
2015	World Championships	(China) Beijing	8th	High jump	2.25 m	
2016	World Indoor Championships	(United States) Portland	1st	High jump	2.36 m	
2016	European Championships	(Netherlands) Amsterdam	1st	High jump	2.32 m	
2017	World Championships	(United Kingdom) London	13th (q)	High jump	2.29 m	SB
2019	European Indoor Championships	(United Kingdom) Glasgow	1st	High jump	2.32 m	SB =
2021	European Indoor Championships	(Poland) Toruń	2nd	High jump	2.35 m	
2021	Olympic Games	(Japan) Tokyo	1st	High jump	2.37 m	SB
2022	World Indoor Championships	(Serbia) Belgrade	3rd	High jump	2.31 m	
2022	European Championships	(Germany) Munich	1st	High jump	2.30 m	
2023	European Team Championships	(Poland) Chorzów	1st	High jump	2.29 m	
2023	World Championships	(Hungary) Budapest	1st	High jump	2.36 m	SB
2024	European Championships	(Italy) Rome	1st	High jump	2.37 m	CR
2024	Olympic Games	(France) Paris	11th	High jump	2.22 m	
2026	European Championships	(United Kingdom) Birmingham	1st	High jump	2.32 m	
2026	World Ultimate Championship	(Hungary) Budapest	1st	High jump	2.37 m	WL

=== Circuit wins and titles ===
- Diamond League champion: 2021, 2022, 2024.

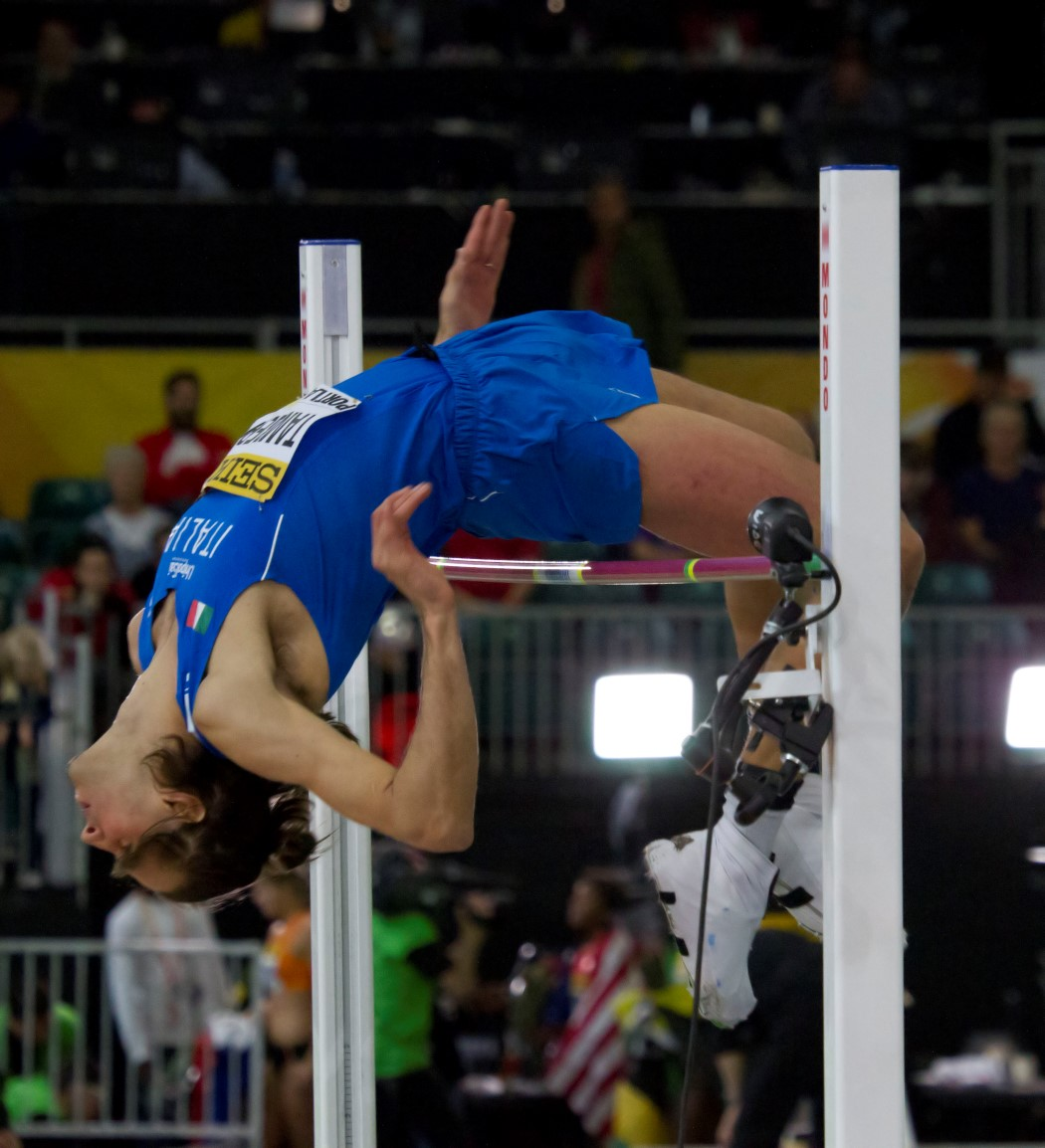
The winning jump of Tamberi at 2.36 m at Portland 2016

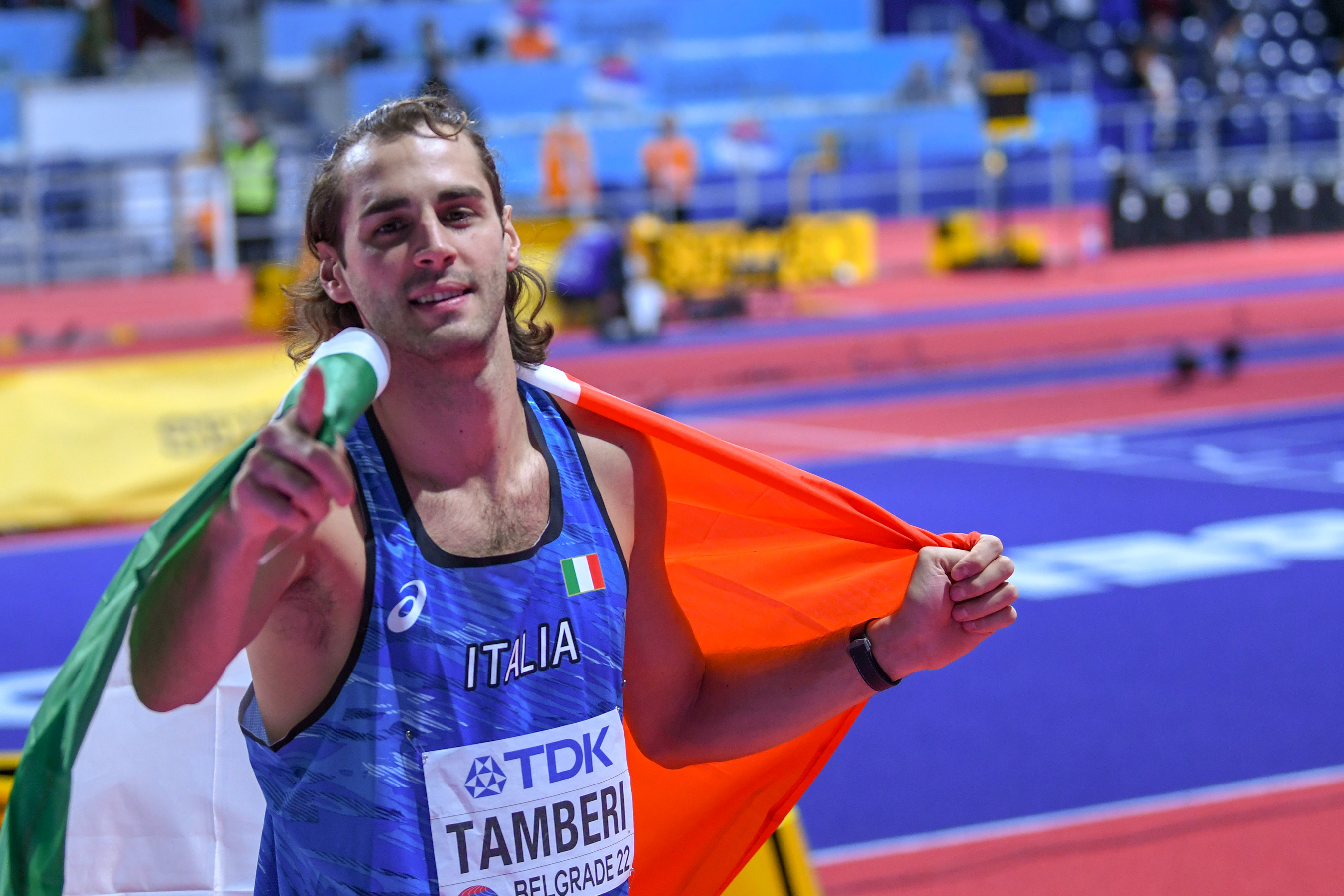
Tamberi with his bronze medal at Belgrade 2022

Meetings

- 2015
  - London Grand Prix (Diamond League) – (United Kingdom) London, 2.28 m (silver)
  - Meeting Eberstadt – (Germany) Eberstadt, 2.37 m (silver) NR
  - Weltklasse (Diamond League) – (Switzerland) Zürich, 2.23 m (5th)
- 2016
  - High Jump Moravia Tour – (Czech Republic) Hustopeče, 2.38 m (gold) NR
  - Meeting International Mohammed VI (Diamond League) – (Morocco) Rabat, 2.25 m (6th)
  - Golden Gala (Diamond League) – (Italy) Rome, 2.30 m (bronze)
  - Müller Grand Prix (Diamond League) – (United Kingdom) Birmingham, 2.20 m (8th)
  - Herculis (Diamond League) – (Monaco) Monte Carlo, 2.39 m (gold) NR
- 2017
  - Meeting de Paris (Diamond League) – (France) Paris, NM
  - Meeting International Mohammed VI (Diamond League) – (Morocco) Rabat, 2.27 m (silver)
  - Müller Grand Prix (Diamond League) – (United Kingdom) Birmingham, 2.20 m (7th)
  - Weltklasse (Diamond League) – (Switzerland) Zürich, 2.16 m (12th)
- 2018
  - Athletissima (Diamond League) – (Switzerland) Lausanne, 2.25 m (9th)
  - Herculis (Diamond League) – (Monaco) Monte Carlo, 2.27 m (5th) SB
  - Eberstadt Internationales Hochsprung-Meeting – (Germany) Eberstadt, 2.33 m (2nd) SB
  - Memorial van Damme (Diamond League) – (Belgium) Brussels, 2.31 m (3rd)

=== National titles ===
Tamberi won the national championships 9 times.

- Italian Athletics Championships
  - High jump: 2012, 2014, 2016, 2018, 2020, 2022 (6)
- Italian Indoor Athletics Championships
  - High jump: 2016, 2019, 2021 (3)

== See also ==
- Athletes with most medals in high jump history
- List of Italian records in athletics
- Italian all-time top lists – High jump
- Men's high jump Italian record progression

== Notes ==
Olympic Games
Preceded by Elia Viviani; Jessica Rossi	Flagbearer for Italy; París 2024; With: Arianna Errigo	Succeeded by Incumbent
