= Jesse Sandesh =

Indian athlete

Jesse Sandesh (born 22 October 1995) is an Indian athlete who competes in high jump. He is named as part of the Indian team for the 2022 Asian Games at Hangzhou, China. He made it to the finals on October 4, 2023.

== Career ==
- 2023: In June, he won a silver in the Indian Championships at Kalinga Stadium, Bhubaneshwar.
- 2023: In May, he won a silver at the 26th National Federation Cup Senior Athletics Championships, Birsa Munda Football Stadium, Morabadi, Ranchi.
- 2023: In March, he won a silver at the Indian Grand Prix at LNCPE, Trivandrum.
- 2022: In June, he won a silver in the National Inter State Senior Athletics Championships at Jawaharlal Nehru Stadium, Chennai.
- 2022: In May, he won a silver at the Indian Grand Prix, Bhubaneshwar.
- 2022: In April, he won a silver at the National Federation Cup, at Muhammed Koya Stadium, Thenhipalam.
- 2022: In March, he won a gold in the Inter-Railway Championships at Kolkata.
