= Leonard Grospe =

Filipino high jumper

Personal information
- National team: Philippines
- Born: July 2, 2001 (age 25) Dilasag, Aurora, Philippines

Sport
- Sport: Athletics
- Event: High jump
- College team: Mapúa University

Achievements and titles
- Personal bests: High jump 2.21m (2024, NR); Indoor high jump 2.15 (2023, NR)
Medal record
Men's athletics
Representing Philippines
Asian Beach Games
Gold medal – first place	2026 Sanya	Beach high jump
SEA Games
Bronze medal – third place	2025 Thailand	High jump

Leonard Grospe (born July 2, 2001) is a Filipino high jumper.

== Early life ==
Leonard Grospe was born on July 2, 2001, in Dilasag, Aurora. He is the eldest of three siblings.

== Career ==
Grospe became a high jumper. He was coached by Maritess Lopez and Rodolfo Leti in high school. He became part of the Philippines national athletics team pool in 2019 under coach Sean Guevara who scouted him in a regional tournament.

He has frequently appeared in the SEA Games, taking part in the 2019, 2021, and 2023 editions. At the 2025 SEA Games in Thailand, Grospe won a bronze medal.

At the 2023 Philippine National Games, Grospe broke the national record in athletics set by Guevara by jumping 2.20 meters. He won a gold medal in the event. Guevara's record was 2.17 meters back in the 2005 Philippine National Open. He broke his own record again at the 2024 Thailand Track and Field Championships, jumping 2.21 meters for the silver medal.

Grospe is also a holder of the indoor high jump national record. He jumped 2.14 meters at the 2023 Asian Indoor Athletics Championships in Kazakhstan in the qualifiers and 2.15 meters in the finals. The previous record was set by Tyler Ruiz in Naperville, United States in 2014 who jumped 2.09 meters.

At the collegiate level, Grospe competes for the Mapua Cardinals in the National Collegiate Athletic Association (NCAA). In NCAA Season 99 (2024), he is a triple gold medalist.

Grospe won a gold medal for the Philippines in the high jump in beach athletics at the 2026 Asian Beach Games in Sanya, China. This was despite Grospe finding jumping on sand slippier than the traditional variant of the discipline.

== Competition record ==
Year	Competition	Venue	Position	Notes
Representing Philippines
2023	Asian Indoor Championships	Astana, Kazakhstan	7th	2.15 m NR
2025	Asian Championships	Gumi, South Korea	11th	2.10 m
2025	SEA Games	Bangkok, Thailand	3rd	2.19 m
2026	Asian Indoor Championships	Tianjin, China	6th	2.05 m
2026	Asian Beach Games	Sanya, China	1st	2.05 m
2026	Asian Games	Nagoya, Japan	9th	2.05 m
