= Dmytro Nikitin =

Ukrainian high jumper

Personal information
- Born: 31 July 1999 (age 27) Berdychiv, Ukraine

Achievements and titles
- Personal best: 2.28 m (2017, 2021)
Medal record
Representing Ukraine
Men's athletics

Dmytro Nikitin (Ukrainian: Дмитро Нікітін; born 31 July 1999) is a Ukrainian high jumper.

== Career ==
He hails from Berdychiv. Successful in the age-specific categories, Nikitin won the silver medal at the 2015 World Youth Championships, the gold medal at the 2015 European Youth Olympic Festival, the bronze medal at the 2016 European Youth Championships and the silver medal at the 2017 European U20 Championships. He also finished ninth at the 2018 World U20 Championships and seventh at the 2019 Athletics U23 Championships. His personal best as an U20 athlete was 2.28 metres, achieved at the 2017 European U20 Championships in Grosseto.

In 2020 he won his first Balkan Indoor Championships; the winning result of 2.24 metres was his second best ever. He also finished fourth at both the Ukrainian Indoor Championships and Ukrainian Championships. In 2021, he jumped 2.28 metres again, this time in the Ukrainian Indoor Cup at KMSHVSM Arena, Kyiv. He also participated on the World Athletics Indoor Tour in Toruń as well as the 2021 European Indoor Championships in the same location, where he finished fifth.

Following the Russian invasion of Ukraine in 2022, Nikitin relocated to Finland. Here, he wanted "to do sports in order to remind the world what is happening in Ukraine", and to gain respect for Ukraine through sports performances. In 2023, he went back to Ukraine and won the Ukrainian Championships in Lutsk. He was allowed to compete in the 2023 World Championships, albeit without progressing to the final round. He finished third at the 2024 Ukrainian Indoor Championships and 2024 Ukrainian Championships, and won the 2024 Balkan Indoor Championships, all in 2.20 metres, and competed at the 2024 European Championships without reaching the final.
