= Daniel Kosonen =

Finnish high jumper (born 2000)

Personal information
- Nationality: Finnish
- Born: 17 September 2000 (age 25)

Sport
- Sport: Athletics
- Event: High jump

Achievements and titles
- Personal bests: High jump: 2.24m (Helsinki, 2024)

Daniel Kosonen (born 17 September 2000) is a Finnish high jumper and volleyball player. He is a multiple-time national champion in the high jump. He made his major championship debut at the 2025 European Athletics Indoor Championships.

== Biography ==
He is a member of Tampere Pyrinnö. In June 2020, he set a personal best of 2.21 metres in Lempäälä. In January 2022, he increased his personal best to 2.22 metres whilst competing indoors, having attempted the height on 28 separate occasions in various competitions, and was quoted as saying "I almost fainted when the monkey fell off my back".

Although he missed a large chunk of the 2024 season with injury, he returned to win the Finnish national championships and set a personal best of 2.24 metres in August 2024 in Helsinki.

He qualified for the final of the 2025 European Athletics Indoor Championships with a successful high jump of 2.23 metres. Competing in the final, he cleared 2.17 metres successfully which was enough for joint seventh place.

On 1 March 2026, he won the high jump at the Finish Indoor Championships in Espoo. In August 2026, he competed at the 2026 European Athletics Championships in Birmingham, England.

== Personal life ==
From Tampere, he combines his athletics career with playing volleyball in the Finnish divisions. He played in the men's second division for Luja-Lukko in Pälkäne, coached by his father Heikki Kosonen and when they earned promotion to the top division he considered quitting athletics to pursue volleyball only. He was formerly in the Finnish army. He often competes with flamboyant hair colours and patterns and with decorated finger nails. His eldest sister Gabriela is a Finnish Championship-level high jumper and his sister Jessica is a major league volleyball player for Kuusamo. He is a Christian.
