= Manuel Lando =

Italian high jumper

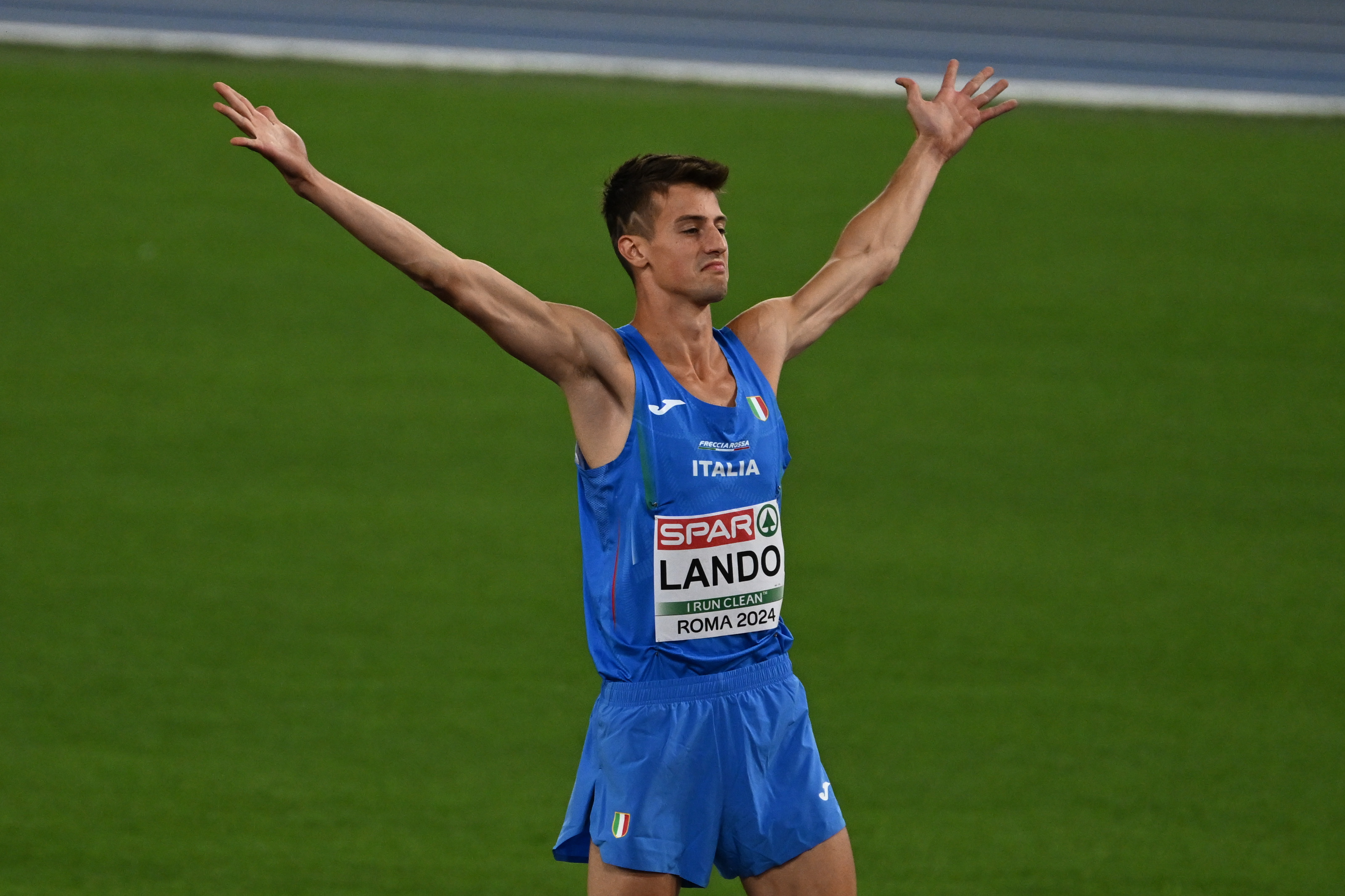

Personal information
- National team: Italian Team
- Born: 4 August 2000 (age 25) Cittadella, Italy
- Height: 1.90 m (6 ft 3 in)
- Weight: 67 kg (148 lb)

Sport
- Sport: Athletics
- Event: High jump
- Club: C.S. Aeronautica Militare
- Coached by: Alberto Lazzaro

Achievements and titles
- Highest world ranking: 45
- Personal best: High jump: 2.25 m (2023)
Medal record
Men's athletics
Representing Italy
European U23 Championships
| Silver medal – second place | 2021 Tallinn | High jump |

Manuel Lando (born 4 August 2000) is an Italian high jumper.

== Achievements ==
| Year | Competition | Venue | Rank | Event | Measure | Notes |
|---|---|---|---|---|---|---|
| 2021 | European U23 Championships | (Estonia) Tallinn | 2nd | High jump | 2.17 m | PB |
| 2024 | European Championships | (Italy) Rome | 6th | High jump | 2.22 m | |

== See also ==
- Italy at the 2024 European Athletics Championships
