= Fu Chao-hsuan =

Taiwanese high jumper (born 2002)

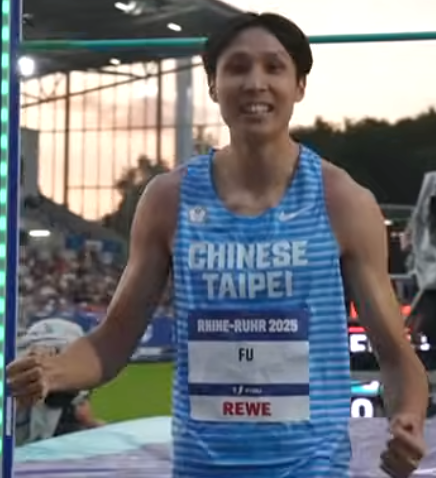
- At the 2025 Summer World University Games

Personal information
- Born: 14 December 2002 (age 23)

Sport
- Sport: Athletics
- Event: High Jump

Achievements and titles
- Personal best: High jump: 2.27 m (2025)
Medal record
Men's athletics
Representing Chinese Taipei
Asian Games
Gold medal – first place	2026 Nagoya	High jump
World University Games
Silver medal – second place	2025 Bochum	High jump
Silver medal – second place	2023 Chengdu	High jump

Fu Chao-hsuan 傅兆玄 (born 14 December 2002) is a Taiwanese high jumper. He won the gold medal at the 2026 Asian Games. He competed at the 2025 World Athletics Championships and is a two-time silver medalist at the Summer World University Games.

== Biography ==
He finished sixth in the high jump at the 2023 Asian Athletics Championships in Bangkok, Thailand. He won the silver medal in the high jump at the delayed 2021 Summer World University Games held in Chengdu, China, in August 2023, with a best jump of 2.20 metres. He finished sixth in the high jump at the delayed 2022 Asian Games in Hangzhou, China in 2023.

He jumped a new personal best of 2.27 metres at the Taipei National Spring Athletics Open in Taipei City in February 2025. He finished sixth in the high jump at the 2025 Asian Athletics Championships in Gumi, South Korea. He won the silver medal in the high jump at the 2025 Summer World University Games in Bochum, Germany, with a jump of 2.25 metres.

He competed for Taiwan at the 2025 World Athletics Championships in Tokyo, Japan.

Competing at the 2026 Asian Games in Nagoya, Japan, in September 2026, he won the gold medal in the high jump following a first-time clearance of 2.25 metres.
