= Oleh Doroshchuk =

Ukrainian high jumper (born 2001)

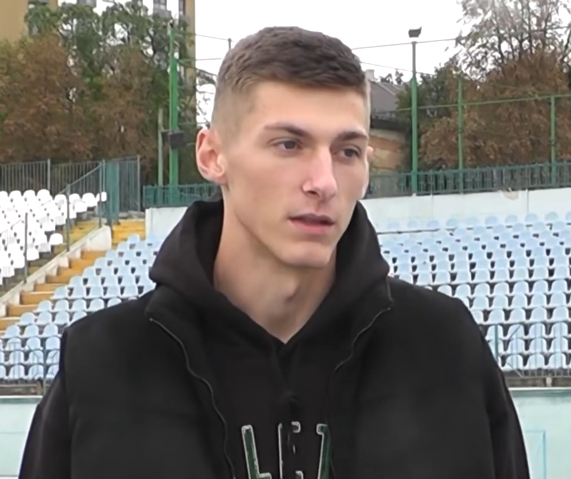

Personal information
- Nationality: Ukrainian
- Born: 4 July 2001 (age 25) Kropyvnytskyi, Ukraine
- Height: 2.00 m (6 ft 7 in)

Sport
- Sport: Athletics
- Event: High jump

Achievements and titles
- Personal bests: 2.34 m (7 ft 8 in) i (Apeldoorn, 2025)
Medal record
Men's athletics
Representing Ukraine
World Indoor Championships
Gold medal – first place	2026 Toruń	High jump
Diamond League Final
Second place	2024	High jump
Third place	2026	High jump
European Championships
Silver medal – second place	2026 Birmingham	High jump
Bronze medal – third place	2024 Rome	High jump
European Indoor Championships
Gold medal – first place	2025 Apeldoorn	High jump
European Athletics U23 Championships
Silver medal – second place	2023 Espoo	High jump
European U20 Championships
Silver medal – second place	2019 Borås	High jump
Youth Olympic Games
Bronze medal – third place	2018 Buenos Aires	High jump

Oleh Yevheniyovych Doroshchuk (Ukrainian: Олег Євгенійович Дорощук; born 4 July 2001) is a Ukrainian high jumper. He is the reigning World and European indoor champion having won gold medals at the 2026 World Athletics Indoor Championships and 2025 European Athletics Indoor Championships. He previously won a bronze medal at the 2024 European Athletics Championships.

== Biography ==
He won bronze in the high jump at the 2018 Summer Youth Olympics in Buenos Aires in October 2018. He finished second at the 2019 European Athletics U20 Championships in Boras.

He finished fourth at the 2022 European Athletics Championships in Munich in August 2022. He won the Ukrainian national high jump title in September 2022 in Lutsk.

He won silver at the European Athletics U23 Championships in Espoo in July 2023, sharing the runner-up spot with compatriot Roman Petruk on count-back. He competed at the 2023 World Athletics Championships in Budapest where he qualified for the final.

He won the Ukrainian indoor national title in the high jump in February 2024 in Kyiv. That month, he jumped a personal best height of 2.30m in Banská Bystrica at the Banskobystrická latka competition. He finished fourth at the 2024 World Athletics Indoor Championships in Glasgow in March 2024.

Competing at the 2024 European Athletics Championships in Rome in June 2024, he won the bronze medal on the high jump competition with a clearance of 2.26 metres. He competed at the 2024 Summer Olympics, where he qualified for the final, finishing in sixth place overall with a personal best clearance of 2.31 metres.

=== European indoor champion ===
He set a new personal best height of 2.32 metres at the Ukrainian Indoor Championships in Kyiv on 22 February 2025. In March 2025, he won the gold medal at the 2025 European Athletics Indoor Championships in Apeldoorn, achieving a personal best height of 2.34 metres. He competed at the 2025 World Athletics Indoor Championships, where he finished in fifth place overall on countback, as one of four athletes who cleared 2.28 metres, including silver and bronze medalists Hamish Kerr and Ratmond Richards.

He was runner-up with a clearance of 2.30 metres at the Diamond League event at the 2025 Golden Gala in Rome on 6 June 2025. He cleared 2.25 metres to win at the 2025 Memorial Van Damme in the Diamond League, in Brussels, Belgium. He cleared 2.28 metres to place third at the 2025 Kamila Skolimowska Memorial in Poland on 16 August, and placed second with a clearance of 2.30 metres at the 2025 Diamond League Final in Zurich on 28 August. In September, he cleared 2.31 metres to place fourth overall at the 2025 World Athletics Championships in Tokyo, Japan.

=== 2026: World Indoor Champion ===
Doroshchuk jumped 2.30m to win the men's high jump title at the 2026 Ukrainian Indoor Championships. He also cleared 2.30 metres to win the gold medal at the 2026 World Athletics Indoor Championships in Poland on 21 March 2026, winning ahead of Erick Portillo of Mexico. On 19 June, he placed third at the 2026 Doha Diamond League. On 27 June, he cleared his best height outdoors with 2.33 metres at the Vitaly Lonskiy Memorial street event in Berdychiv, Ukraine. On 10 July, he won with a clearance of 2.32m ahead of Kimani Jack at the 2026 Herculis Diamond League event in Monaco. In August, he won the silver medal behind Gianmarco Tamberi at the 2026 European Championships in Birmingham, clearing 2.30 metres. At the 2026 Diamond League Final in Brussels on 4 September, he shared third place with Tamberi with both having clearances of 2.25m.
