= Mateusz Kołodziejski =

Polish athlete (born 2002)

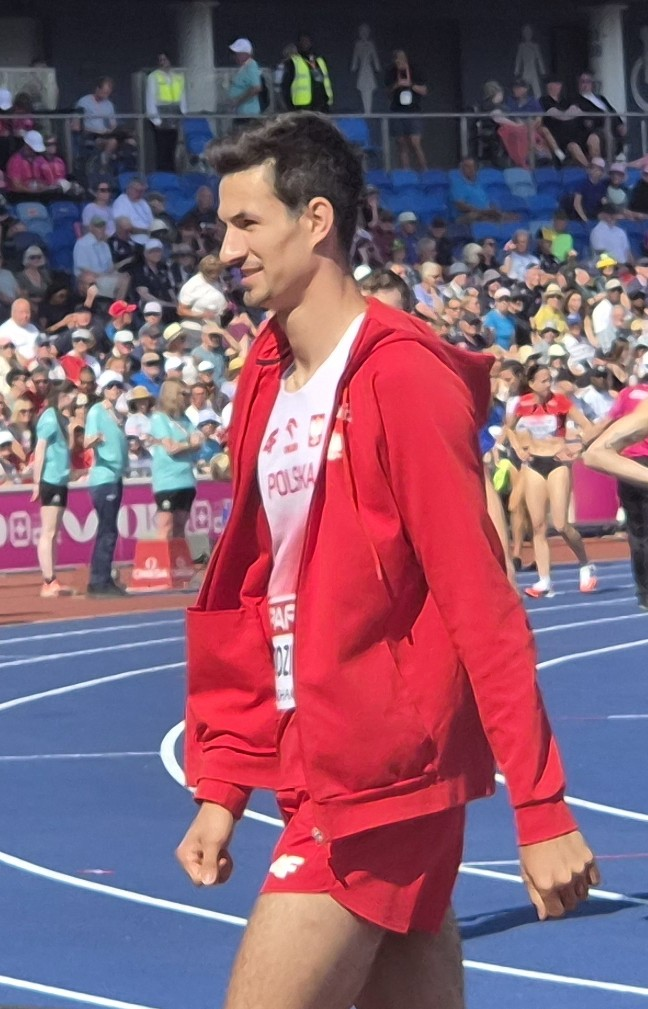
- 2026 European Championships

Personal information
- Nationality: Polish
- Born: 22 June 2002 (age 24)

Sport
- Sport: Athletics
- Event: High jump

Achievements and titles
- Personal bests: High jump: 2.30 (Hustopeče, 2026)
Medal record
Men's athletics
Representing Poland
Diamond League
Gold medal – first place	2026 Brussels	High jump
World U20 Championships
Bronze medal – third place	2021 Nairobi	High jump
European U20 Championships
Silver medal – second place	2021 Tallinn	High jump

Mateusz Kołodziejski (Polish: [maˈtɛuʂ kɔwɔˈd͡ʑɛjski]; born 22 June 2002) is a Polish high jumper. In 2021, he was a medalist at both the World under-20 and European under-20 championships. He has since triumphed at the senior Polish Athletics Championships.

== Biography ==
Kołodziejski is a member of Zawisza Bydgoszcz in Bydgoszcz, Poland. He won the silver medal in the high jump in Tallinn, Estonia at the 2021 European Athletics U20 Championships, with best jump of 2.23 metres. He won the bronze medal in the high jump in Nairobi, Kenya at the 2021 World Athletics U20 Championships. He won the senior Polish Athletics Championships for the first time in Suwalki, in June 2022.

Kołodziejski made his senior debut at a major championship representing Poland at the 2024 European Athletics Championships in Rome, Italy, but did not progress from the qualifying heat to the final, with his best jump being 2.17 metres.

Kołodziejski set a new personal best of 2.24 metres at the Polish University Championships in Poznań in May 2025. He competed for Poland at the 2025 European Athletics Team Championships First Division in Madrid, Spain, where he successfully cleared 2.21 metres. He placed fourth in the high jump at the 2025 Summer World University Games in Bochum, Germany.

Kołodziejski cleared 2.22 metres to place seventh at the 2025 Kamila Skolimowska Memorial in Poland on 16 August, part of the 2025 Diamond League. He won the Polish Athletics Championships ahead of Mikołaj Szczęsny on 23 August 2025 with a jump of 2.19 meters. Kołodziejski competed at the 2025 World Athletics Championships in Tokyo, Japan.

Kołodziejski set a new personal best of 2.30 metres in Hustopeče in February 2026. He won the title at the 2026 Polish Indoor Athletics Championships ahead of Szczęsny, with a jump of 2.24 metres. He was selected for the 2026 World Athletics Indoor Championships in March 2026 in Poland, placing seventh overall. On 4 June, he placed fourth at the 2026 Golden Gala in Rome, part of the 2026 Diamond League. In August 2026, he competed at the 2026 European Athletics Championships in Birmingham, England, placing joint-fifth overall. On 23 August, he jumped 2.26 m to place fourth in the Diamond League at the 2026 Kamila Skolimowska Memorial in Silesia, Poland. At the 2026 Diamond League Final in Brussels on 4 September, Kołodziejski won the high jump competition. He and JuVaughn Harrison both cleared 2.28m, with Kołodziejski winning the title on countback.
