= Kampton Kam =

Singaporean high jumper

- Kam competing in the 2025 Southeast Asian Games, where he won silver

Personal information
- Born: 6 March 2001 (age 25) Singapore
- Height: 186cm (6ft 1in)

Sport
- Sport: Athletics
- Event: High jump
Medal record
Men's athletics
Representing Singapore
Southeast Asian Games
Silver medal – second place	2025 Thailand	High jump
ASEAN School Games
Gold medal – first place	2018 Selangor	High jump
Gold medal – first place	2019 Semarang	High jump
Southeast Asian Youth Championships
Gold medal – first place	2018 Bangkok	High jump
Singapore Open
Gold medal – first place	2022 Singapore	High jump
National Championship
Gold medal – first place	2022 Singapore	High jump

Kampton Kam (born 6 March 2001) is an athlete from Singapore specialising in the high jump. He holds the national high jump records for the U18 (2.10m), U19 (2.15m), U20 (2.15m), U23 (2.20m), and men's indoor (2.21m). On 12 Apr 2025, the 24-year-old cleared 2.25m, setting a new Singapore Men’s Outdoor High Jump National Record at the 2025 South Florida Invitational on 11 April; this surpassed the 2.22m held by Wong Yew Tong since the 1995 SEA Games.

== Education ==
Kam is an alumnus of Victoria School and Victoria Junior College. In 2018, he was awarded The Straits Times - Young Star of the Month, an award backed by 100PLUS to outstanding school athletes. The following year, he received the Singapore Olympic-Foundation Peter Lim Scholarship. He was also named the Singapore Schools Sports Council Best Sportsboy of the year for Track and Field in 2019 and 2020. In 2022, he enrolled in the Wharton School of the University of Pennsylvania.

== High jump career ==
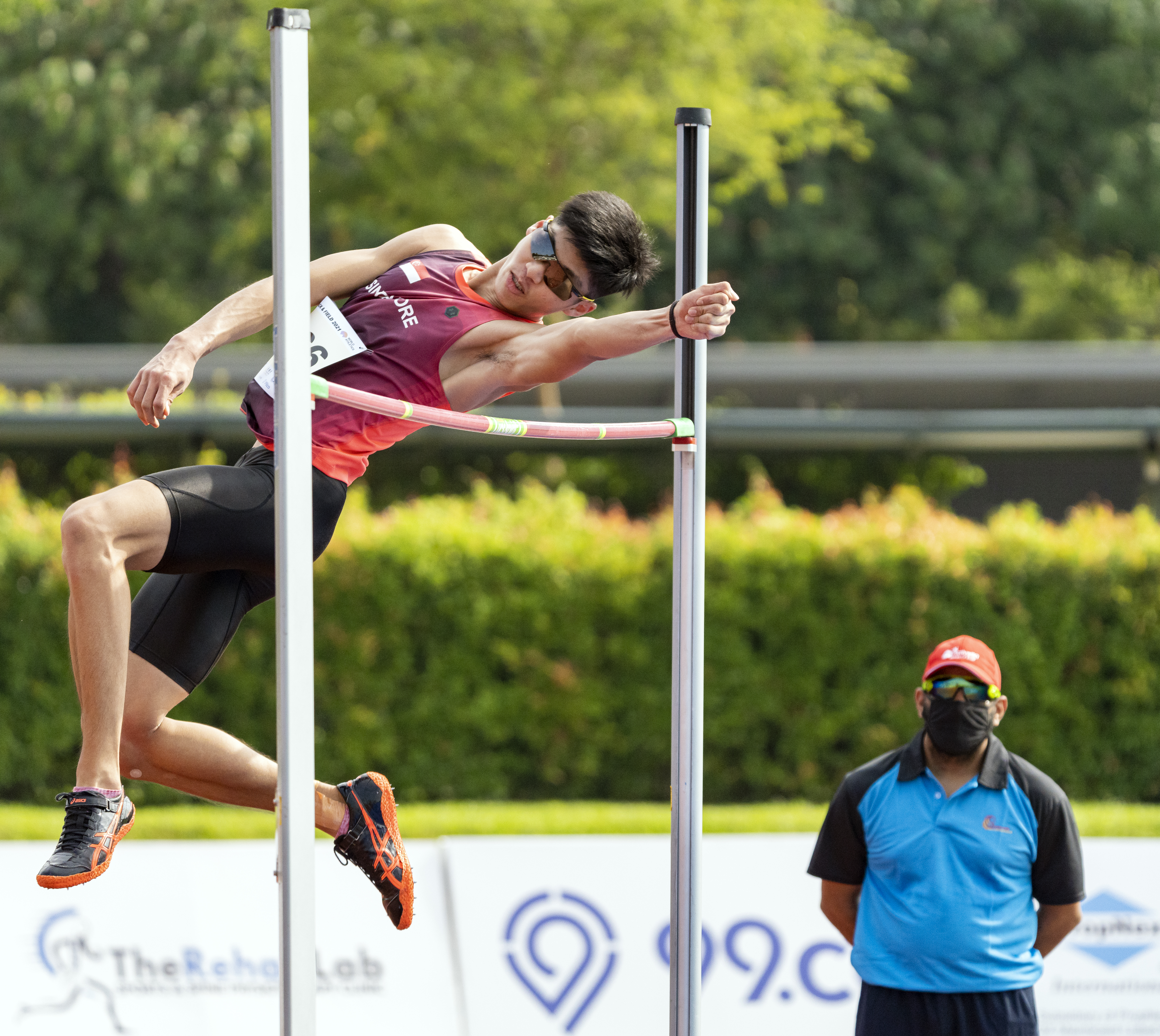
Kam competing in 2021

Kam set his U-18 record at the 2018 ASEAN School Games, where he won the gold. The U-20 record was set at the 2019 National School Games, where he defended his title and became the first local schoolboy to clear 7 feet in the high jump.

Kam competed at the Youth Olympic Games Asia Area Qualification and placed 5th with a personal best then of 2.05m, qualifying him for the 2018 Youth Olympic Games. In the first round, he finished 6th with a 2.05m effort. In the second round, he cleared 2.07m for a combined height of 4.12m to finish 7th. He also competed at the Asian Athletics Championship 2019 in Doha, Qatar, 2019 Southeast Asian Games in New Clark City, Philippines and Taiwan Athletics Open 2019.

Internationally, Kam was ranked 16th and 29th in the world in the 2018 and 2019 season as a youth (U18) and junior (U20) athlete respectively.

Kam first set the national indoor mark in Sweden in 2021 with a jump of 2.05m. In January 2023, he rewrote the record twice, jumping 2.06m at the Penn 10 Team-Select in New York, and 2.08m at the Wesley Brown Invitational in Maryland. He then improved on the record jumping 2.15m at the Penn State National Open in January 2024.

In 2022, a week before the 2022 Southeast Asian Games, Kam suffered a collapsed lung and had to withdraw. Three months later, he managed to finish 12th at the 2022 Commonwealth Games.

On 10 February 2024, Kam cleared 2.20m at Darius Dixon Memorial Invitational to rewrite the national indoor mark he had set two weeks prior (2.15m).

Year	Competition	Venue	Position	Notes
2018	Southeast Asian Youth Athletics Championships	Bangkok, Thailand	1st	1.99 m
2018	2018 Hong Kong Inter-City Athletic Championships	Hong Kong, China	1st	2.03 m
2018	Youth Olympic Games Asia Area Qualification	Bangkok, Thailand	5th	2.05 m
2018	2018 ASEAN School Games	Kuala Lumpur, Malaysia	1st	2.10 m NR
2018	2018 Youth Olympic Games	Buenos Aires, Argentina	6th	2.05 m
2018	2018 Youth Olympic Games	Buenos Aires, Argentina	7th	2.07 m
2019	2019 National School Games	Singapore, Singapore	1st	2.15 m NR
2019	2019 Asian Athletics Championships	Doha, Qatar	14th	2.10 m
2019	2019 Taiwan Athletics Open	Taipei, Taiwan	2nd	2.12 m
2019	2019 ASEAN School Games	Semarang, Indonesia	1st	2.10 m
2019	2019 Southeast Asian Games	New Clark City, Philippines	7th	2.08 m
2021	2021 2nd National Performance Trial	Singapore, Singapore	1st	2.05 m
2021	2021 Luciahoppet 2021	Karlstad, Sweden	1st	2.05 m NR
2022	2022 Singapore National Championships	Singapore, Singapore	1st	2.15 m
2022	Singapore Open	Singapore, Singapore	1st	2.20m
2022	2022 Commonwealth Games	Birmingham, United Kingdom	12th	2.10 m
2023	2023 Penn 10 Team-Select	Staten Island, New York	1st	2.06 m NR
2023	Wesley Brown Invitational	Annapolis, Maryland	1st	2.08m NR
2023	2021 Summer World University Games	Chengdu, China	12th	2.00m
2023	2022 Asian Games (Qualifying Round)	Hangzhou, China	7th	2.15m
2023	2022 Asian Games (Finals)	Hangzhou, China	11th	2.15m
2024	2024 Penn State National Open	Penn State, Pennsylvania	1st	2.15 m NR
2024	Darius Dixon Memorial Invitation 2024	Liberty University, Virginia	1st	2.20 m NR
2024	2024 Ivy League Heptagonal Indoor Track & Field Championships	Harvard University, Massachusetts	1st	2.18 m
2025	2025 Ivy League Heptagonal Indoor Track & Field Championships	Ithaca, New York	1st	2.21 m NR
2025	2025 South Florida Invitational	Tampa, Florida	1st	2.25 m NR
2025	2025 Penn Relays	Philadelphia, Pennsylvania	1st	2.20 m
2026	2025 Ivy League Heptagonal Indoor Track & Field Championships	Columbia, New York	1st	2.12 m
2026	2026 Penn Relays	Philadelphia, Pennsylvania	1st	2.17 m
2026	2026 Commonwealth Games (Finals)	Glasgow, United Kingdom	8th	2.05m
2026	2026 Asian Games (Finals)	Nagoya, Japan	8th	2.10m
