= Qatar at the 2025 World Athletics Championships =

- Flag of Qatar
- WA code: QAT

in Tokyo, Japan 13 September 2025 – 21 September 2025
- Competitors: 12 (12 men and 0 women)
- Medals Ranked 41st: Gold 0 Silver 0 Bronze 1 Total 1

World Athletics Championships appearances
- 1983; 1987; 1991; 1993; 1995; 1997; 1999; 2001; 2003; 2005; 2007; 2009; 2011; 2013; 2015; 2017; 2019; 2022; 2023; 2025

Qatar competed at the 2025 World Athletics Championships in Tokyo, Japan, from 13 to 21 September 2025.

== Medallists ==
| Medal | Athlete | Event | Date |
|---|---|---|---|
| Bronze | Abderrahman Samba | Men's 400 metres hurdles | September 19 |

== Results ==
Qatar entered 12 athletes to the championships, all male.

Key

- Q = Qualified for the next round
- q = Qualified for the next round as a fastest loser or, in field events, by position without achieving the qualifying target
- NR = National record
- PB = Personal best
- SB = Season best
- N/A = Round not applicable for the event

=== Men ===
Track and road events

| Athlete | Event | Heat | | Semifinal | | Final | |
| Athlete | Event | Result | Rank | Result | Rank | Result | Rank |
|---|---|---|---|---|---|---|---|
| Ammar Ismail Yahia Ibrahim | 400 metres | 44.63 PB | 4 q | 44.74 | 4 | Did not advance | |
| Ibrahim Abass M Chuot | 800 metres | 1:45.16 | 4 | Did not advance | | | |
| Oumar Doudai Abakar | 110 metres hurdles | 14.03 | 8 | Did not advance | | | |
| Ismail Doudai Abakar | 400 metres hurdles | 48.34 | 2 Q | 47.61 PB | 2 Q | 49.82 | 8 |
| Bassem Hemeida | 400 metres hurdles | 48.43 | 1 Q | 48.29 PB | 3 | Did not advance | |
| Abderrahman Samba | 400 metres hurdles | 48.03 | 1 Q | 47.63 | 1 Q | 47.06 SB | 3rd place, bronze medalist(s) |
| Ismail Doudai Abakar; Ammar Ibrahim; Bassem Hemeida; Abderrahman Samba | 4 × 400 metres relay | 3:00.15 NR | 2 Q | —N/a | | 3:01.64 | 5 |

Field events

| Athlete | Event | Qualification | | Final | |
| Athlete | Event | Distance | Position | Distance | Position |
|---|---|---|---|---|---|
| Seifeldin Heneida Abdesalam | Pole vault | 5.75 NR | 11 q | 5.75 NR | 9 |
