= 2014 World Junior Championships in Athletics – Men's high jump =

The men's high jump event at the 2014 World Junior Championships in Athletics was held in Eugene, Oregon, USA, at Hayward Field on 23 and 25 July.

== Medalists ==
Gold	Mikhail Akimenko; Russia
Silver	Dzmitry Nabokau; Belarus
Bronze	Woo Sanghyeok; South Korea

== Records ==
Standing records prior to the 2014 World Junior Championships in Athletics
World Junior Record	Dragutin Topić (YUG)	2.37	Plovdiv, Bulgaria	12 August 1990
World Junior Record	Steve Smith (GBR)	2.37	Seoul, South Korea	20 September 1992
Championship Record	Dragutin Topić (YUG)	2.37	Plovdiv, Bulgaria	12 August 1990
Championship Record	Steve Smith (GBR)	2.37	Seoul, South Korea	20 September 1992
World Junior Leading	Andrei Skabeika (BLR)	2.26	Brest, Belarus	31 May 2014
Broken records during the 2014 World Junior Championships in Athletics

== Results ==
=== Final ===
25 July
Start time: 18:29 Temperature: 28 °C Humidity: 33 %
End time: 20:35 Temperature: 25 °C Humidity: 41 %

Rank	Name	Nationality	Attempts								Result	Notes
Rank	Name	Nationality	2.05	2.10	2.14	2.17	2.20	2.22	2.24	2.26	Result	Notes
1st place, gold medalist(s)	Mikhail Akimenko	Russia	o	o	o	o	o	o	xo	xxx	2.24	PB
2nd place, silver medalist(s)	Dzmitry Nabokau	Belarus	o	xxo	o	o	o	xxo	xo	xxx	2.24	PB
3rd place, bronze medalist(s)	Woo Sang-hyeok	South Korea	-	o	o	o	xo	xo	xxo	xxx	2.24	PB
4	Christoff Bryan	Jamaica	o	xo	o	xo	o	xo	xxo	xxx	2.24	PB
5	Falk Wendrich	Germany	o	o	o	o	o	xxo	xxx		2.22	SB
6	Danil Lysenko	Russia	o	o	o	xo	o	xxo	xxx		2.22	
7	Chris Kandu	United Kingdom	-	o	o	o	o	-	xxx		2.20	
8	Joel Baden	Australia	-	o	o	o	xxx				2.17	
9	Tobias Potye	Germany	o	xo	xo	o	xxx				2.17	
10	Clayton Brown	Jamaica	xo	xxo	xo	xxo	xxx				2.17	PB
11	Andrei Skabeika	Belarus	o	o	xxx						2.10	
11	Yeóryios Tessaromátis	Greece	o	o	xxx						2.10	
13	Yu Nakazawa	Japan	xxo	xxx							2.05	

=== Qualifications ===
23 July
With qualifying standard of 2.19 (Q) or at least the 12 best performers (q) advance to the Final

==== Summary ====
Rank	Name	Nationality	Result	Notes
1	Danil Lysenko	Russia	2.14	q
1	Falk Wendrich	Germany	2.14	q
1	Joel Baden	Australia	2.14	q
1	Mikhail Akimenko	Russia	2.14	q
1	Woo Sanghyeok	South Korea	2.14	q
1	Tobias Potye	Germany	2.14	q
7	Christoff Bryan	Jamaica	2.14	q
8	Andrei Skabeika	Belarus	2.14	q
9	Chris Kandu	United Kingdom	2.14	q
9	Dmitri Nabokau	Belarus	2.14	q
11	Yu Nakazawa	Japan	2.14	q
12	Clayton Brown	Jamaica	2.10	q
12	Yeóryios Tessaromátis	Greece	2.10	q
14	Jonathan Wells	United States	2.10	SB
15	Victor Korst	Portugal	2.10	
16	Rory Dwyer	United Kingdom	2.10	
16	Fabian Delryd	Sweden	2.10	
18	Damian Nowicki	Poland	2.05	
19	Landon Bartel	United States	2.05	
20	Petr Pícha	Czech Republic	2.05	
21	Alperen Acet	Turkey	2.00	
21	Daisuke Nakajima	Japan	2.00	
21	Tiaan Steenkamp	South Africa	2.00	
	Arturo Abascal	Mexico	NM	
	Federico Ayres da Motta	Italy	NM	
	Yohan Chaverra	Colombia	NM	

==== Details ====
With qualifying standard of 2.19 (Q) or at least the 12 best performers (q) advance to the Final

===== Group A =====
25 July
Start time; 18:16 Temperature: 18 °C Humidity: 64 %
End time: 19:18 Temperature: 18 °C Humidity: 56 %

Rank	Name	Nationality	Attempts						Result	Notes
Rank	Name	Nationality	2.00	2.05	2.10	2.14	2.17	2.19	Result	Notes
1	Mikhail Akimenko	Russia	o	o	o	o			2.14	q
1	Joel Baden	Australia	-	o	o	o			2.14	q
1	Tobias Potye	Germany	o	o	o	o			2.14	q
4	Christoff Bryan	Jamaica	-	o	xo	o			2.14	q
5	Andrei Skabeika	Belarus	o	o	xo	xo			2.14	q
6	Yu Nakazawa	Japan	o	xo	xo	xxo			2.14	q
7	Yeóryios Tessaromátis	Greece	-	o	o	xxx			2.10	q
8	Rory Dwyer	United Kingdom	o	xo	xxo	xxx			2.10	
9	Damian Nowicki	Poland	o	o	xxx				2.05	
10	Landon Bartel	United States	xxo	xo	xxx				2.05	
11	Alperen Acet	Turkey	o	xxx					2.00	
11	Tiaan Steenkamp	South Africa	o	xxx					2.00	
	Arturo Abascal	Mexico	-	-	xxx				NM	

===== Group B =====
25 July
Start time; 18:14 Temperature: 18 °C Humidity: 64 %
End time: 19:19 Temperature: 18 °C Humidity: 56 %

Rank	Name	Nationality	Attempts						Result	Notes
Rank	Name	Nationality	2.00	2.05	2.10	2.14	2.17	2.19	Result	Notes
1	Danil Lysenko	Russia	o	o	o	o			2.14	q
1	Falk Wendrich	Germany	o	o	o	o			2.14	q
1	Woo Sanghyeok	South Korea	-	o	-	o			2.14	q
4	Chris Kandu	United Kingdom	-	-	o	xxo			2.14	q
4	Dmitri Nabokau	Belarus	o	o	o	xxo			2.14	q
6	Clayton Brown	Jamaica	-	o	o	xxx			2.10	q
7	Jonathan Wells	United States	-	o	xo	xxx			2.10	SB
8	Victor Korst	Portugal	o	o	xxo	xxx			2.10	
9	Fabian Delryd	Sweden	xo	o	xxo	xxx			2.10	
10	Petr Pícha	Czech Republic	o	xxo	xxx				2.05	
11	Daisuke Nakajima	Japan	o	xxx					2.00	
	Yohan Chaverra	Colombia	-	xxx					NM	
	Federico Ayres da Motta	Italy	xxx						NM	

== Participation ==
According to an unofficial count, 26 athletes from 19 countries participated in the event.

- Australia (1)
- Belarus (2)
- Colombia (1)
- Czech Republic (1)
- Germany (2)
- Greece (1)
- Italy (1)
- Jamaica (2)
- Japan (2)
- Mexico (1)
- Poland (1)
- Portugal (1)
- Russia (2)
- South Africa (1)
- South Korea (1)
- Sweden (1)
- Turkey (1)
- United Kingdom (2)
- United States (2)
