= 2019 World Athletics Championships – Men's high jump =

Men's high jump at the 2019 World Championships
- Venue: Khalifa International Stadium
- Dates: 1 October (qualification); 4 October (final)
- Competitors: 31 from 21 nations
- Winning height: 2.37

Medalists
gold medal	Mutaz Essa Barshim; Qatar
silver medal	Mikhail Akimenko; Authorised Neutral Athletes
bronze medal	Ilya Ivanyuk; Authorised Neutral Athletes

Video on YouTube Official Video

The men's high jump at the 2019 World Athletics Championships was held at the Khalifa International Stadium in Doha from 1 to 4 October.

== Summary ==
When Qatari officials put together the bid to host these championships, Doha born Mutaz Essa Barshim was a 23 year old with a World Junior Championship, Olympic bronze and World Championship silver medal. In addition, he was defending champion.

The finals pared down to 7 over 2.30m. At 2.33m, Mikhail Akimenko got over on his first attempt to maintain a clean round and Maksim Nedasekau also was over on his first attempt. Shudder, Barshim, who had a clean series going so far, missed along with five others (veteran Gianmarco Tamberi saved attempts after missing 2.30m once). On the second attempt, everyone missed again. Tamberi eliminated, that trend started the third round of attempts as Luis Zayas and Michael Mason missed and were eliminated. Then it was Barshim's last attempt. He got over it and sighs of relief could be heard all over Qatar. Next up, Brandon Starc missed, then Ilya Ivanyuk also made it to leave four over 2.33m, with Akimenko holding the advantage.

Moving up to 2.35m, Nedasekau missed, then Barshim, Akimenko and Ivanyuk all made it on their first attempts. Akimenko still had a clean series. With three earlier misses, vs two each for Barshim and Ivanyuk, Nedasekau could see he was off the podium and passed. At 2.37 m (7 ft 9 1/4 in), Nedasekau missed. Next up, on his first attempt, Barshim made it, and no else was able to clear the height.

== Records ==
Before the competition records were as follows:

World record	Javier Sotomayor (CUB)	2.45 m	Salamanca, Spain	27 July 1993
Championship record	Bohdan Bondarenko (UKR)	2.41 m	Moscow, Russia	15 August 2013
World Leading	Maksim Nedasekau (BLR)	2.35 m	Minsk, Belarus	9 September 2019
African Record	Jacques Freitag (RSA)	2.38 m	Oudtshoorn, South Africa	5 March 2005
Asian Record	Mutaz Essa Barshim (QAT)	2.43 m	Brussels, Belgium	5 September 2014
North, Central American and Caribbean record	Javier Sotomayor (CUB)	2.45 m	Salamanca, Spain	27 July 1993
South American Record	Gilmar Mayo (COL)	2.33 m	Pereira, Colombia	17 October 1994
European Record	Patrik Sjöberg (SWE)	2.42 m	Stockholm, Sweden	30 June 1987
Oceanian record	Tim Forsyth (AUS)	2.36 m	Melbourne, Australia	2 March 1997
Oceanian record	Brandon Starc (AUS)	2.36 m	Eberstadt, Germany	26 August 2018

== Qualification standard ==
The standard to automatically qualify for entry was 2.30 m. for a quota number of 32 athletes.

Only 24 high jumpers reached 2.30 m during the qualification period (2018-2019), indoors and outdoors. The final entries were made by completing to 31 athletes, including the defending world champion Mutaz Essa Barshim (wild card, only 2.27 m before the competition) and 1 Best country athlete, Lee Hup Wei.

The qualifiers with less than 2.30 m are:

- Douwe Amels, 2.28 m (q)
- Adrijus Glebauskas, 2.28 m (q)
- Luis Castro, 2.28 m (q)
- Mathew Sawe, ACh, 2.28 m (Q)
- Keenon Laine, 2.28 m indoor (q) [2.26] (2018)
- Lee Hup Wei, BCA, 2.27 m in Kuala Lumpur (31 Mar 2019)
- Ryo Sato, 2.27 m (q)

== Schedule ==
The event schedule, in local time (UTC+3), was as follows:

Date	Time	Round
1 October	16:50	Qualification
4 October	20:15	Final

== Results ==
=== Qualification ===
Qualification: 2.31 m (Q) or at least 12 best performers (q).

Rank	Group	Name	Nationality	2.17	2.22	2.26	2.29	Mark	Notes
1	B	Mikhail Akimenko	Authorised Neutral Athletes	o	o	o	o	2.29	q
1	A	Mutaz Essa Barshim	Qatar	o	o	o	o	2.29	q, SB
1	A	Ilya Ivanyuk	Authorised Neutral Athletes	o	o	o	o	2.29	q
4	A	Brandon Starc	Australia	o	o	xo	o	2.29	q
4	A	Luis Zayas	Cuba	o	o	xo	o	2.29	q
6	B	Michael Mason	Canada	o	o	o	xo	2.29	q
7	B	Wang Yu	China	o	o	xo	xo	2.29	q
8	B	Jeron Robinson	United States	o	o	xxo	xo	2.29	q
9	B	Lee Hup Wei	Malaysia	o	o	o	xxo	2.29	q, PB
10	B	Gianmarco Tamberi	Italy	o	o	xo	xxo	2.29	q
11	A	Luis Castro	Puerto Rico	o	o	xo	xxx	2.26	q
11	A	Maksim Nedasekau	Belarus	o	o	xo	xxx	2.26	q
13	A	Shelby McEwen	United States	xxo	o	xo	xxx	2.26	
14	B	Naoto Tobe	Japan	o	o	xxo	xxx	2.26	
14	B	Andriy Protsenko	Ukraine	o	o	xxo	xxx	2.26	
16	A	Tihomir Ivanov	Bulgaria	o	xo	xxo	xxx	2.26	
16	A	Stefano Sottile	Italy	xo	o	xxo	xxx	2.26	
18	B	Dzmitry Nabokau	Belarus	o	xxo	xxo	xxx	2.26	
19	B	Douwe Amels	Netherlands	o	o	xxx		2.22	
19	A	Donald Thomas	Bahamas	o	o	xxx		2.22	
21	A	Adrijus Glebauskas	Lithuania	o	xo	xxx		2.22	
22	A	Ryo Sato	Japan	xxo	xo	xxx		2.22	
23	A	Django Lovett	Canada	o	xxo	xxx		2.22	
23	B	Hamish Kerr	New Zealand	o	xxo	xr		2.22	
25	B	Takashi Eto	Japan	o	xxx			2.17	
25	B	Joel Baden	Australia	o	xxx			2.17	
25	B	Keenon Laine	United States	o	xxx			2.17	
25	A	Majdeddin Ghazal	Syria	o	xxx			2.17	
29	B	Mathew Sawe	Kenya	xo	xxx			2.17	
30	B	Mateusz Przybylko	Germany	xxo	xxx			2.17	
	A	Bohdan Bondarenko	Ukraine	xr				NH	

=== Final ===
The final was started on 4 October at 20:15.

Rank	Name	Nationality	2.19	2.24	2.27	2.30	2.33	2.35	2.37	Mark	Notes
1st place, gold medalist(s)	Mutaz Essa Barshim	Qatar	o	o	o	o	xxo	o	o	2.37	WL
2nd place, silver medalist(s)	Mikhail Akimenko	Authorised Neutral Athletes	o	o	o	o	o	o	xxx	2.35	PB
3rd place, bronze medalist(s)	Ilya Ivanyuk	Authorised Neutral Athletes	o	o	o	o	xxo	o	xxx	2.35	PB
4	Maksim Nedasekau	Belarus	o	xo	xo	xo	o	x–	xx	2.33	
5	Luis Zayas	Cuba	o	o	o	o	xxx			2.30	PB
6	Brandon Starc	Australia	o	xo	xxo	o	xxx			2.30	SB
7	Michael Mason	Canada	o	o	o	xxo	xxx			2.30	
8	Lee Hup Wei	Malaysia	o	o	xo	xxx				2.27	
8	Gianmarco Tamberi	Italy	o	o	xo	x–	xx			2.27	
10	Wang Yu	China	o	o	xxx					2.24	
11	Jeron Robinson	United States	xo	o	xxx					2.24	
12	Luis Castro	Puerto Rico	o	xxx						2.19	
