= 2016 IAAF World U20 Championships – Men's high jump =

The men's high jump event at the 2016 IAAF World U20 Championships was held at Zdzisław Krzyszkowiak Stadium on 20 and 22 July.

== Medalists ==
Gold	Luis Zayas; Cuba
Silver	Darius Carbin; United States
Bronze	Mohamat Allamine Hamdi; Qatar

== Records ==
Standing records prior to the 2016 IAAF World U20 Championships in Athletics
World Junior Record	Dragutin Topić (YUG)	2.37	Plovdiv, Bulgaria	12 August 1990
World Junior Record	Steve Smith (GBR)	2.37	Seoul, South Korea	20 September 1992
Championship Record	Dragutin Topić (YUG)	2.37	Plovdiv, Bulgaria	12 August 1990
Championship Record	Steve Smith (GBR)	2.37	Seoul, South Korea	20 September 1992
World Junior Leading	Jah-Nhai Perinchief (BER)	2.26	Wichita, United States	16 April 2016
World Junior Leading	Oleksandr Barannikov (UKR)	2.26	Berdychiv, Ukraine	25 June 2016

== Results ==
=== Qualification ===
Qualification: 2.18 (Q) or at least 12 best performers (q) qualified for the final.

Rank	Group	Name	Nationality	2.00	2.05	2.09	2.13	2.16	Result	Note
1	A	Oleksandr Barannikov	Ukraine	–	o	o	o	o	2.16	q
1	A	Mohamat Allamine Hamdi	Qatar	o	o	o	o	o	2.16	q
3	B	Yuji Hiramatsu	Japan	–	–	o	xo	o	2.16	q
4	A	Alperen Acet	Turkey	–	o	o	xxo	o	2.16	q, PB
5	B	Tom Gale	Great Britain	o	o	o	o	xo	2.16	q
5	B	Maksim Nedasekau	Belarus	–	o	o	o	xo	2.16	q
7	A	Luis Zayas	Cuba	–	o	o	xxo	xo	2.16	q
7	B	Joshua Connolly	Australia	o	o	o	xxo	xo	2.16	q, PB
9	A	Darius Carbin	United States	–	o	o	o	xxo	2.16	q
9	B	Christopher Moleya	South Africa	o	o	o	o	xxo	2.16	q
9	B	Jah-Nhai Perinchief	Bermuda	–	o	o	o	xxo	2.16	q
12	B	Roberto Vílches	Mexico	o	–	xo	o	xxo	2.16	q, PB
13	A	John Dodds	Australia	–	xo	o	xo	xxo	2.16	q
14	B	Hussein Al-Ibraheemi	Iraq	o	o	o	o	xxx	2.13	
15	A	Jermaine Francis	Saint Kitts and Nevis	xo	xo	o	o	xxx	2.13	
16	B	Roman Kuzminov	Ukraine	o	xo	o	xo	xxx	2.13	
17	A	Maciej Grynienko	Poland	o	xo	xo	xo	xxx	2.13	
18	A	Stefano Sottile	Italy	–	o	o	xxx		2.09	
18	B	Igor Kopala	Poland	o	o	o	xxx		2.09	
20	A	Rory Dwyer	Great Britain	xo	o	o	xxx		2.09	
20	A	Keitaro Fujita	Japan	o	xo	o	xxx		2.09	
20	B	Michael Burke II	United States	xo	o	o	xxx		2.09	
23	A	Sven van Merode	Netherlands	o	xxo	o	xxx		2.09	
24	B	Metin Doğu	Turkey	–	o	xxx			2.05	

=== Final ===
Rank	Name	Nationality	2.05	2.10	2.14	2.18	2.21	2.23	2.25	2.27	2.29	Result	Note
1st place, gold medalist(s)	Luis Zayas	Cuba	o	o	o	o	o	o	o	o	xx	2.27	WU20L
2nd place, silver medalist(s)	Darius Carbin	United States	o	o	o	xo	o	xxo	xxo	xx–	x	2.25	PB
3rd place, bronze medalist(s)	Mohamat Allamine Hamdi	Qatar	o	o	o	o	o	xxo	xxx			2.23	PB
4	Oleksandr Barannikov	Ukraine	o	o	o	o	o	xxx				2.21	
5	John Dodds	Australia	o	o	xxo	xo	o	xxx				2.21	PB
6	Yuji Hiramatsu	Japan	–	o	o	o	xxo	xxx				2.21	
7	Jah-Nhai Perinchief	Bermuda	o	o	xo	o	xxx					2.18	
8	Maksim Nedasekau	Belarus	o	xo	o	xo	xxx					2.18	
9	Tom Gale	Great Britain	o	o	o	xxo	xxx					2.18	PB
9	Roberto Vílches	Mexico	o	o	o	xxo	xxx					2.18	PB
11	Christopher Moleya	South Africa	o	o	xxo	xxo	xxx					2.18	
12	Alperen Acet	Turkey	o	o	o	xxx						2.14	
	Joshua Connolly	Australia	xxx									NM	
