= 2017 European Athletics U23 Championships – Men's high jump =

The men's high jump event at the 2017 European Athletics U23 Championships was held in Bydgoszcz, Poland, at Zdzisław Krzyszkowiak Stadium on 13 and 15 July.

== Medalists ==
Gold	Dzmitry Nabokau; Belarus
Silver	Christian Falocchi; Italy
Bronze	Viktor Lonskyy; Ukraine

== Results ==
=== Qualification ===
13 July

Qualification rule: 2.18 (Q) or the 12 best results (q) qualified for the final.

Rank	Group	Name	Nationality	1.96	2.01	2.06	2.11	2.15	2.18	Results	Notes
1	A	Viktor Lonskyy	Ukraine	–	–	–	o	o	o	2.18	Q
1	A	Matthieu Tomassi	France	–	–	o	o	o	o	2.18	Q
1	A	Falk Wendrich	Germany	–	–	o	o	o	o	2.18	Q
4	A	Dzmitry Nabokau	Belarus	–	–	o	xo	o	o	2.18	Q
4	B	Pavel Seliverstau	Belarus	–	–	–	o	xo	o	2.18	Q
6	B	Chris Kandu	Great Britain	–	–	–	xo	xxo	o	2.18	Q
7	A	Christian Falocchi	Italy	–	o	–	o	o	xo	2.18	Q, PB
8	B	Norbert Kobielski	Poland	–	–	o	o	xxo	xo	2.18	Q
9	B	Tobias Potye	Germany	–	–	o	xxo	xo	xo	2.18	Q
10	A	Fabian Delryd	Sweden	–	–	o	xo	o	xxo	2.18	Q
11	B	Metin Doğu	Turkey	–	o	o	o	o	xxx	2.15	q, =PB
11	B	Carlos Rojas	Spain	–	o	o	o	o	xxx	2.15	q
11	B	Andrei Skabeika	Belarus	–	–	o	o	o	xxx	2.15	q
14	A	Samuli Eriksson	Finland	–	–	o	xo	xo	xxx	2.15	=SB
15	B	Serhiy Spilnyak	Ukraine	–	o	o	xo	xxo	xxx	2.15	
16	A	Igor Kopala	Poland	–	o	o	o	xxx		2.11	
17	A	Álvaro Martínez	Spain	–	o	xo	o	xxx		2.11	
18	A	Dániel Jankovics	Hungary	–	xxo	o	o	xxx		2.11	
19	B	Vadym Kravchuk	Ukraine	–	o	o	xxx			2.06	
20	B	Jonas Kløjgaard Jensen	Denmark	–	xo	o	xxx			2.06	
21	A	Marc Sánchez	Spain	–	o	xo	xxx			2.06	
22	B	Paolo Lazarić	Croatia	o	xxo	xo	xxx			2.06	

=== Final ===
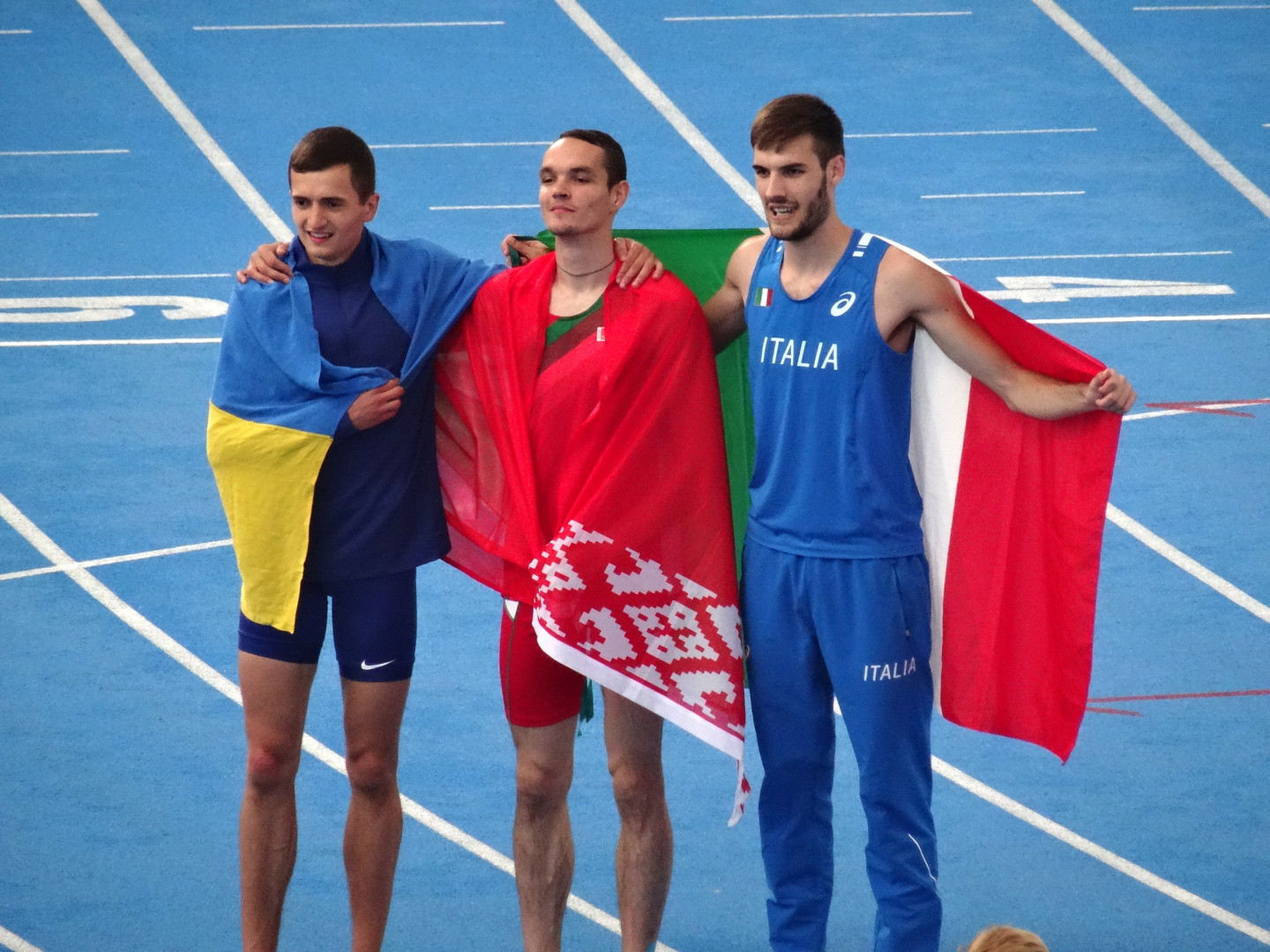
The medallists

15 July

Rank	Name	Nationality	2.00	2.05	2.10	2.15	2.19	2.22	2.24	2.26	Result	Notes
1st place, gold medalist(s)	Dzmitry Nabokau	Belarus	–	–	o	xo	xxo	xxo	o	xxx	2.24	
2nd place, silver medalist(s)	Christian Falocchi	Italy	–	o	o	o	o	o	xo	xxx	2.24	PB
3rd place, bronze medalist(s)	Viktor Lonskyy	Ukraine	–	–	o	o	o	xo	xo	xxx	2.24	
4	Fabian Delryd	Sweden	–	o	o	o	o	o	xxx		2.22	PB
5	Pavel Seliverstau	Belarus	–	–	–	o	o	xo	xx–	x	2.22	
5	Falk Wendrich	Germany	–	–	o	o	o	xo	xxx		2.22	
7	Andrei Skabeika	Belarus	–	xo	o	o	o	xxx			2.19	
8	Norbert Kobielski	Poland	–	–	o	o	xo	xxx			2.19	
9	Carlos Rojas	Spain	o	xo	xxo	xo	xxx				2.15	
10	Tobias Potye	Germany	–	o	o	xxx					2.10	
10	Matthieu Tomassi	France	–	–	o	xxx					2.10	
12	Metin Doğu	Turkey	o	–	xxx						2.00	
	Chris Kandu	Great Britain	–	–	xxx						NM	
