= 2018 IAAF World U20 Championships – Men's high jump =

Men's high jump at the 2018 World U20 Championships
- Venue: Ratina Stadium
- Dates: 12 July (qualification); 14 July (final)
- Competitors: 23 from 18 nations
- Winning height: 2.23 m

Medalists
gold medal	Antonios Merlos	Greece
gold medal	Roberto Vílches	Mexico
bronze medal	JuVaughn Blake	United States
bronze medal	Breyton Poole	South Africa

The men's high jump at the 2018 IAAF World U20 Championships was held at Ratina Stadium on 12 and 14 July.

== Records ==
World U20 Record	Dragutin Topić (YUG)	2.37	Plovdiv, Bulgaria	12 August 1990
World U20 Record	Steve Smith (GBR)	2.37	Seoul, South Korea	20 September 1992
Championship Record	Dragutin Topić (YUG)	2.37	Plovdiv, Bulgaria	12 August 1990
Championship Record	Steve Smith (GBR)	2.37	Seoul, South Korea	20 September 1992
World U20 Leading	Roberto Vílches (MEX)	2.26	Queretaro, Mexico	28 April 2018

== Results ==
=== Qualification ===
The qualification round took place on 12 July, in two groups, both starting at 19:44. Athletes attaining a mark of at least 2.17 metres ( Q ) or at least the 12 best performers ( q ) qualified for the final.

Rank	Group	Name	Nationality	2.00	2.05	2.09	2.12	2.15	Mark	Notes
1	B	Breyton Poole	South Africa	–	o	o	o	o	2.15	q
1	B	Jasmin Halili	Serbia	o	o	–	o	o	2.15	q, SB
3	A	Naoki Higashi	Japan	o	o	xo	o	o	2.15	q
3	A	Nathan Ismar	France	–	o	xo	o	o	2.15	q
3	B	JuVaughn Blake	United States	–	xo	o	o	o	2.15	q
6	B	Luca Meinke	Germany	o	o	xo	xo	xo	2.15	q
7	B	Thomas Carmoy	Belgium	o	o	xo	xxo	xo	2.15	q
8	A	Dmytro Nikitin	Ukraine	o	o	o	o	xxo	2.15	q
8	A	Roberto Vílches	Mexico	–	–	o	o	xxo	2.15	q
10	B	Maid Redžić	Bosnia and Herzegovina	o	o	xxo	xo	xxo	2.15	q
11	A	Antonios Merlos	Greece	–	o	o	xo	xxx	2.12	q
11	B	Filip Mrčić	Croatia	o	o	o	xo	xxx	2.12	q
11	B	Kyohei Tomori	Japan	o	o	o	xo	xxx	2.12	q
14	B	Vladyslav Lavskyy	Ukraine	o	xo	o	xo	xxx	2.12	
15	A	Aleksey Fadeyev	Authorised Neutral Athletes	o	o	o	xxx		2.09	
15	A	Andu Nuh	Qatar	o	o	o	xxx		2.09	
17	B	Noel Vanderzee	Canada	o	xo	o	xxx		2.09	
18	B	Jyles Etienne	Bahamas	–	o	xo	xxx		2.09	SB
19	A	Daniel Claxton	United States	o	o	xxx			2.05	
19	A	Kyle Alcine	Bahamas	–	o	–	xxx		2.05	
19	A	Pablo López	Spain	–	o	xxx			2.05	
22	A	Lucas Mihota	Germany	xo	o	xxx			2.05	
	A	Aliaksandr Kisialiou	Belarus	xxx					NM	

=== Final ===
The final was held on 14 July at 10:40.

Rank	Name	Nationality	2.07	2.12	2.16	2.19	2.21	2.23	2.25	Mark	Notes
1st place, gold medalist(s)	Antonios Merlos	Greece	o	xo	o	o	o	o	xxx	2.23	PB
1st place, gold medalist(s)	Roberto Vílches	Mexico	o	o	o	xo	o	o	xxx	2.23	
3rd place, bronze medalist(s)	JuVaughn Blake	United States	o	o	o	o	o	xo	xxx	2.23	PB
3rd place, bronze medalist(s)	Breyton Poole	South Africa	o	o	o	o	o	xo	xxx	2.23	SB
5	Luca Meinke	Germany	xo	o	o	o	xxo	xxx		2.21	PB
6	Nathan Ismar	France	o	xo	o	o	xxx			2.19	PB
7	Kyohei Tomori	Japan	o	o	xxo	o	xxx			2.19	PB
8	Thomas Carmoy	Belgium	o	o	xo	xxo	xxx			2.19	SB
9	Dmytro Nikitin	Ukraine	xo	o	o	xxx				2.16	SB
10	Naoki Higashi	Japan	o	xo	xxo	xxx				2.16	
11	Jasmin Halili	Serbia	o	o	–	xxx				2.12	
12	Maid Redžić	Bosnia and Herzegovina	o	xo	xxx					2.12	
13	Filip Mrčić	Croatia	o	xxx						2.07	
