= Malaysia at the 2023 World Athletics Championships =

- Flag of Malaysia
- WA code: MAS

in Budapest, Hungary 19 August 2023 – 27 August 2023
- Competitors: 1 (1 man and 0 women)
- Medals: Gold 0 Silver 0 Bronze 0 Total 0

World Athletics Championships appearances
- 1983; 1987; 1991; 1993; 1995; 1997; 1999; 2001; 2003; 2005; 2007; 2009; 2011; 2013; 2015; 2017; 2019; 2022; 2023; 2025

Malaysia competed at the 2023 World Athletics Championships in Budapest, Hungary, which were held from 19 to 27 August 2023. The athlete delegation of the nation was composed of one competitor, sprinter Muhd Azeem Fahmi who competed in the men's 100 metres. He qualified for the Championships upon being selected by the Malaysia Athletics Federation. In the preliminary heats, he placed first in his heat, the fastest amongst all of the heats held, and advanced to the first round heats. In the first round heats, he placed seventh in his heat and failed to advance further.

== Background ==
The 2023 World Athletics Championships in Budapest, Hungary, were held from 19 to 27 August 2023. The Championships were held at the National Athletics Centre. To qualify for the World Championships, athletes had to reach an entry standard (e.g. time or distance), place in a specific position at select competitions, be a wild card entry, or qualify through their World Athletics Ranking at the end of the qualification period.

As Malaysia did not meet any of the four standards, they could send either one male or one female athlete in one event of the Championships who has not yet qualified. The Malaysia Athletics Federation selected sprinter Muhd Azeem Fahmi, who would compete in the men's 100 metres. In the entry list for the Championships, he held a personal best of 10.09 seconds, a season's best of 10.11 seconds, and was ranked 115th in the World Athletics Rankings.

== Results ==
Key

- Q = Qualified for the next round
- q = Qualified for the next round as a fastest loser or, in field events, by position without achieving the qualifying target
- NR = National record
- PB = Personal best
- SB = Season best
- N/A = Round not applicable for the event

=== Men ===
Azeem competed in the second heat of the preliminary heats on 19 August against six other sprinters. There, he recorded a time of 10.24 seconds and placed first in his heat, advancing further to the first round heats as he was within the top two of his heat. His time was the fastest amongst all of the athletes that competed in the preliminaries. He then competed in the fourth heat of the first round heats held the same day against seven other sprinters. There, he recorded a time of 10.26 seconds and placed seventh, failing to advance further as he was not within the top three of his heat nor was he one of the three next fastest sprinters.

Track and road events

Athlete	Event	Preliminary		Heat		Semifinal		Final	
Athlete	Event	Result	Rank	Result	Rank	Result	Rank	Result	Rank
Muhd Azeem Fahmi	100 metres	10.24	1 Q	10.26	7	Did not advance			
