= Athletics at the 2019 Summer Universiade – Men's high jump =

The men's high jump event at the 2019 Summer Universiade was held on 8 and 10 July at the Stadio San Paolo in Naples.

== Medalists ==
Gold	Silver	Bronze
Tihomir Ivanov; Bulgaria	Alperen Acet; Turkey	Adrijus Glebauskas; Lithuania

== Results ==
=== Qualification ===
Qualification: 2.23 m (Q) or at least 12 best (q) qualified for the final.

Rank	Group	Name	Nationality	1.90	2.00	2.10	2.15	2.20	Result	Notes
1	A	Adrijus Glebauskas	Lithuania	–	–	o	o	o	2.20	q, SB
1	A	Alperen Acet	Turkey	–	–	o	o	o	2.20	q
3	A	Brenton Foster	Australia	–	o	o	o	xxo	2.20	q
4	B	Andrei Skabeika	Belarus	–	–	xo	o	xxo	2.20	q
4	B	Vadym Kravchuk	Ukraine	–	–	o	xo	xxo	2.20	q, PB
6	A	Tihomir Ivanov	Bulgaria	–	–	o	o	–	2.15	q
6	A	Breyton Poole	South Africa	–	–	o	o	x–	2.15	q
8	A	Mpho Links	South Africa	–	–	xo	o	x–	2.15	q
8	B	Grant Szalek	Australia	–	o	xo	o	xxx	2.15	q
8	B	William Grimsey	Great Britain	–	o	xo	o	xxx	2.15	q
8	B	Hamish Kerr	New Zealand	–	–	xo	o	xx–	2.15	q
12	A	Viktor Lonskyi	Ukraine	–	–	–	xo	–	2.15	q
13	B	Falk Wendrich	Germany	–	–	xo	xo	xxx	2.15	
13	B	Victor Korst	Portugal	–	o	xo	xo	xxx	2.15	
15	B	Mantas Liekis	Lithuania	o	o	o	xxo	xxx	2.15	
16	A	Eugenio Meloni	Italy	–	o	o	xxx		2.10	
17	A	Rizky Ghusyafa Pratama	Indonesia	o	o	xo	xxx		2.10	
17	A	Kim Jun-un	South Korea	–	o	xo	xxx		2.10	
19	B	Dmitriy Melsitov	Uzbekistan	–	xo	xxo	xxx		2.10	
20	B	Arturo Abascal	Mexico	–	o	xxx			2.00	
21	B	Chanuk Patiraja Mudalige	Sri Lanka	o	xxo	xxx			2.00	
22	B	Tomáš Zeman	Slovakia	o	xxx				1.90	
23	A	Hussain Al-Shwakair	Saudi Arabia	xo	xxx				1.90	
	A	Aadarsh Jothi Shankar	India	–	xxx				NM	

=== Final ===
Official Video

Rank	Name	Nationality	2.05	2.10	2.15	2.18	2.21	2.24	2.27	2.30	2.33	Result	Notes
1st place, gold medalist(s)	Tihomir Ivanov	Bulgaria	–	–	o	–	o	–	xxo	o	xxx	2.30	SB
2nd place, silver medalist(s)	Alperen Acet	Turkey	–	o	o	–	o	xo	xxx			2.24	
3rd place, bronze medalist(s)	Adrijus Glebauskas	Lithuania	–	o	o	xo	o	xo	xxx			2.24	SB
4	Breyton Poole	South Africa	–	o	o	xxo	o	xxx				2.21	
5	Mpho Links	South Africa	–	o	o	–	xo	xxx				2.21	
6	William Grimsey	Great Britain	o	o	o	o	xxx					2.18	
6	Vadym Kravchuk	Ukraine	o	o	o	xo	xxx					2.18	PB
8	Andrei Skabeika	Belarus	–	o	o	xxo	x–	xx				2.18	
9	Grant Szalek	Australia	o	o	o	xxx						2.15	
10	Brenton Foster	Australia	o	xxo	o	xxx						2.15	
11	Viktor Lonskyi	Ukraine	o									2.05	
	Hamish Kerr	New Zealand										DNF	
