= 2022 World Athletics Championships – Men's high jump =

Men's high jump at the 2022 World Championships
- Venue: Hayward Field
- Dates: 15 July (qualification); 18 July (final)
- Competitors: 32 from 22 nations
- Winning height: 2.37

Medalists
gold medal	Mutaz Essa Barshim; Qatar
silver medal	Woo Sang-hyeok; South Korea
bronze medal	Andriy Protsenko; Ukraine

The men's high jump at the 2022 World Athletics Championships was held at the Hayward Field in Eugene, Oregon, on 15 and 18 July.

== Summary ==
Eleven athletes cleared 2.28m, so it turned out a clean round to 2.25m was good enough to get 13 (12 plus ties) into the final. In the final ten survived 2.27m, only five got over 2.30m. Defending champion, co-Olympic Champion Mutaz Essa Barshim, Woo Sang-hyeok and Shelby McEwen all had perfect rounds going and thus were tied for first place. Co-Olympic Champion Gianmarco Tamberi cleared on his last attempt to hold on to the fifth spot. At 2.33m Woo missed, Andriy Protsenko made it on his first attempt to take the lead, for the 30 seconds it took for Barshim to be called and also clear, with a clean round, to take the lead back. Tamberi cleared on his second attempt to take over third place while McEwen missed twice and saved his last remaining attempt for the next height. At 2.35m, Woo and Protsenko missed, Barshim remained perfect and McEwen bowed out. Woo made it on his second attempt to keep the competition alive, Protsenko and Tamberi missed. Protsenko elected to save his final attempt for 2.37m, Tamberi missed and was out. At 2.37 m (7 ft 9 1/4 in), Woo then Protsenko missed, leaving Protsenko with the bronze. Barshim cleared it again leaving Woo no other choices but to pass. And after Woo missed at 2.39m made the calculated gamble. If Woo made his final attempt, Barshim could lose gold at the last second, or at least be pressured to make one of the top 10 jumps in history (which he has done on 5 occasions). Woo failed, taking silver. A perfect round and gold already in hand, Barshim took one attempt at 2.42m and called it a day.

=== Preview ===
- Preview

== Records ==
Before the competition records were as follows:

World record	Javier Sotomayor (CUB)	2.45 m	Salamanca, Spain	27 July 1993
Championship record	Bohdan Bondarenko (UKR)	2.41 m	Moscow, Russia	15 August 2013
World Leading	Ilya Ivanyuk (ANA)	2.34 m	Moscow, Russia	7 June 2022
African Record	Jacques Freitag (RSA)	2.38 m	Oudtshoorn, South Africa	5 March 2005
Asian Record	Mutaz Essa Barshim (QAT)	2.43 m	Brussels, Belgium	5 September 2014
North, Central American and Caribbean record	Javier Sotomayor (CUB)	2.45 m	Salamanca, Spain	27 July 1993
South American Record	Gilmar Mayo (COL)	2.33 m	Pereira, Colombia	17 October 1994
European Record	Patrik Sjöberg (SWE)	2.42 m	Stockholm, Sweden	30 June 1987
Oceanian record	Tim Forsyth (AUS)	2.36 m	Melbourne, Australia	2 March 1997
Oceanian record	Brandon Starc (AUS)	2.36 m	Eberstadt, Germany	26 August 2018

== Qualification standard ==
The standard to automatically qualify for entry was 2.33 m, with a qualification period from 28 June 2021 to 26 June 2022, for a quota number of 32 athletes.

Only 6 high jumpers reached 2.33 m during the qualification period (2021-2022), indoors and outdoors (Barshim, Tamberi, Woo, Starc, Harrison and McEwen). 2 jumpers were selected by finishing position at designated competitions (Ferreira and Kerr, area champions). The final entries were made by completing to 32 athletes, including the defending world champion Mutaz Essa Barshim (wild card), and the Diamond League winner Gianmarco Tamberi, (wild card), both defending Olympic Champions in Tokyo 2020.

Neither the 2022 world leader, Ilya Ivanyuk, nor Russian or Belarusian athletes, as Maksim Nedasekau, 3rd in Ranking, were admitted, even under ANA status.

Naoto Tobe, qualified by ranking, withdrawn. Even if regularly entered, Brandon Starc preferred to focus on the following 2022 Commonwealth Games.

== World athletics ranking ==
Before the 2022 World Championships:

1. Gianmarco Tamberi ITA 1404 points, High Jump [incl. High Jump indoor]
2. Woo Sang-hyeok KOR 1376 pts High Jump [High Jump ind.]
3. Maksim Nedasekau BLR 1354 pts High Jump
4. Django Lovett CAN 1334 pts High Jump
5. Ilya Ivanyuk ANA 1318 pts High Jump
6. JuVaughn Harrison USA 1305 pts High Jump [High Jump ind.]
7. Mikhail Akimenko RUS 1295 pts High Jump [High Jump ind.]
8. Andriy Protsenko UKR 1294 pts High Jump
9. Hamish Kerr NZL 1292 pts High Jump [High Jump ind.]
10. Brandon Starc AUS 1291 pts High Jump
11. Shelby McEwen USA 1270 pts High Jump
12. Norbert Kobielski POL 1261 pts High Jump [High Jump ind.]

== Schedule ==
The event schedule, in local time (UTC-7), is as follows:

Date	Time	Round
15 July	10:10	Qualification
18 July	17:45	Final

== Results ==
=== Qualification ===
Qualification: 2.30 m (Q) or at least 12 best performers (q). Only 29 athletes are entered on the quota number of 32: Brandon Starc and defending South American champion Fernando Ferreira did not finally enter.

Rank	Group	Name	Nationality	2.17	2.21	2.25	2.28	2.30	Mark	Notes
1	A	Woo Sang-hyeok	South Korea	o	o	o	o		2.28	q
1	A	Django Lovett	Canada	o	o	o	o		2.28	q, =SB
1	A	Andriy Protsenko	Ukraine	o	o	o	o		2.28	q
1	A	Mutaz Essa Barshim	Qatar	o	–	o	o		2.28	q
5	B	Luis Enrique Zayas	Cuba	o	xo	o	o		2.28	q
6	A	Tomohiro Shinno	Japan	o	xo	xo	o		2.28	q
7	B	JuVaughn Harrison	United States	o	o	o	xo		2.28	q
8	B	Yonathan Kapitolnik	Israel	o	xo	o	xo		2.28	q
9	A	Shelby McEwen	United States	o	o	o	xxo		2.28	q
9	B	Joel Baden	Australia	o	o	o	xxo		2.28	q, SB
11	B	Gianmarco Tamberi	Italy	o	o	xxo	xxo		2.28	q
12	B	Edgar Rivera	Mexico	o	o	o	xxx		2.25	q
12	B	Mateusz Przybylko	Germany	o	o	o	xxx		2.25	q
14	B	Hamish Kerr	New Zealand	o	xo	o	xxx		2.25	
15	B	Oleh Doroshchuk	Ukraine	o	o	xo	xxx		2.25	
16	A	Marco Fassinotti	Italy	xo	xo	xo	xxx		2.25	
17	A	Thomas Carmoy	Belgium	o	xo	xxo	xxx		2.25	
18	B	Thiago Moura	Brazil	o	xxo	xxo	xxx		2.25	
19	A	Tobias Potye	Germany	o	o	xxx			2.21	
19	B	Ryoichi Akamatsu	Japan	o	o	xxx			2.21	
21	A	Carlos Layoy	Argentina	o	xo	xxx			2.21	=SB
22	A	Loïc Gasch	Switzerland	xo	xo	xxx			2.21	
23	B	Donald Thomas	Bahamas	o	xxo	xxx			2.21	
23	B	Joel Clarke-Khan	Great Britain & N.I.	o	xxo	xxx			2.21	
25	B	Darius Carbin	United States	o	xxx				2.17	
26	A	Yual Reath	Australia	xxo	xxx				2.17	
	A	Nauraj Singh Randhawa	Malaysia	xxx					NM	
	A	Norbert Kobielski	Poland	xr					NM	
	A	Majd Eddin Ghazal	Syria							DNS

=== Final ===
The final started on 18 July at 17:45.

Rank	Name	Nationality	2.19	2.24	2.27	2.30	2.33	2.35	2.37	2.39	2.42	Mark	Notes
1st place, gold medalist(s)	Mutaz Essa Barshim	Qatar	–	o	o	o	o	o	o	–	x	2.37	WL
2nd place, silver medalist(s)	Woo Sang-hyeok	South Korea	o	o	o	o	xxo	xo	x-	xx		2.35	=NR
3rd place, bronze medalist(s)	Andriy Protsenko	Ukraine	xo	o	xxo	o	o	xx-	x			2.33	SB
4	Gianmarco Tamberi	Italy	o	o	o	xxo	xo	xxx				2.33	SB
5	Shelby McEwen	United States	o	o	o	o	xx-	x				2.30	
6	Django Lovett	Canada	o	o	o	xxx						2.27	
6	Luis Enrique Zayas	Cuba	o	o	o	xxx						2.27	
8	Tomohiro Shinno	Japan	xo	xo	o	xxx						2.27	
9	JuVaughn Harrison	United States	o	o	xxo	xxx						2.27	
10	Joel Baden	Australia	o	xo	xo	xxx						2.27	
11	Yonathan Kapitolnik	Israel	o	o	xxx							2.24	
12	Mateusz Przybylko	Germany	o	xxo	xxx							2.24	
13	Edgar Rivera	Mexico	xo	xxx								2.19	
