= 2015 European Athletics U23 Championships – Men's high jump =

The men's high jump event at the 2015 European Athletics U23 Championships was held in Tallinn, Estonia, at Kadriorg Stadium on 9 and 11 July.

== Medalists ==
Gold	Ilya Ivanyuk; Russia
Silver	Dmitriy Kroyter; Israel
Bronze	Chris Kandu; United Kingdom
Bronze	Eugenio Meloni; Italy

== Results ==
=== Final ===
11 July

Rank	Name	Nationality	Attempts									Result	Notes
Rank	Name	Nationality	2.05	2.10	2.15	2.18	2.21	2.24	2.28	2.30	2.32	Result	Notes
1st place, gold medalist(s)	Ilya Ivanyuk	Russia	–	o	o	o	xxo	o	o	xo	r	2.30	PB
2nd place, silver medalist(s)	Dmitriy Kroyter	Israel	–	xo	o	o	o	o	x–	xx		2.24	SB
3rd place, bronze medalist(s)	Chris Kandu	United Kingdom	–	–	o	o	o	xxx				2.21	SB
3rd place, bronze medalist(s)	Eugenio Meloni	Italy	o	o	o	o	o	xxx				2.21	PB
5	Péter Bakosi	Hungary	–	o	o	xo	xxo	xxx				2.21	SB
6	Mikhail Akimenko	Russia	–	o	xo	o	xxx					2.18	
7	Tihomir Ivanov	Bulgaria	–	o	o	xo	xxx					2.18	
8	Tobias Potye	Germany	o	o	xxo	xxo	xxx					2.18	
9	Janick Klausen	Denmark	–	o	xo	–	xxx					2.15	
10	Tiago Pereira	Portugal	–	o	xxo	xxx						2.15	
10	Bram Ghuys	Belgium	–	o	xxo	xxx						2.15	
12	Andreas Carlsson	Sweden	o	o	xxx							2.10	

=== Qualifications ===
9 July

Rank	Name	Nationality	Attempts					Result	Notes
Rank	Name	Nationality	2.00	2.05	2.10	2.15	2.18	Result	Notes
1	Dmitriy Kroyter	Israel	–	o	o	o	o	2.18	q
2	Chris Kandu	United Kingdom	–	–	o	o	xo	2.18	q
2	Bram Ghuys	Belgium	–	–	o	o	xo	2.18	q
4	Tobias Potye	Germany	–	o	o	xo	xo	2.18	q
5	Tiago Pereira	Portugal	–	–	o	xxo	xo	2.18	q
5	Ilya Ivanyuk	Russia	–	o	xo	xo	xo	2.18	q
7	Péter Bakosi	Hungary	–	–	o	o	xxo	2.18	q
8	Tihomir Ivanov	Bulgaria	–	–	o	xo	xxo	2.18	q
8	Mikhail Akimenko	Russia	–	–	o	xo	xxo	2.18	q
8	Janick Klausen	Denmark	–	–	o	xo	xxo	2.18	q
8	Eugenio Meloni	Italy	o	o	o	xo	xxo	2.18	=PB q
12	Andreas Carlsson	Sweden	o	o	xo	o	xxx	2.15	q
13	Andrei Skabeika	Belarus	o	xo	o	xo	xxx	2.15	
13	Mihai Anastasiu	Romania	–	o	xo	xo	xxx	2.15	
15	Torsten Sanders	Germany	–	o	o	xxo	xxx	2.15	
16	Artur Kolesnyk	Ukraine	o	xxo	xo	xxo	xxx	2.15	
17	Viktor Lonskyy	Ukraine	o	o	o	xxx		2.10	
17	Loïc Gasch	Switzerland	o	o	o	xxx		2.10	
17	Paulo Conceição	Portugal	–	o	o	xxx		2.10	
20	Samuli Eriksson	Finland	–	xo	o	xxx		2.10	
20	Adrijus Glebauskas	Lithuania	o	xo	o	xxx		2.10	SB
22	David Nopper	Germany	o	o	xo	xxx		2.10	
22	Andrei Churyla	Belarus	–	o	xo	xxx		2.10	
24	Pavel Kipra	Belarus	–	o	xxo	xxx		2.10	
25	Quentin Pirlet	Switzerland	o	o	xxx			2.05	

== Participation ==
According to an unofficial count, 25 athletes from 17 countries participated in the event.

- Belarus (3)
- Belgium (1)
- Bulgaria (1)
- Denmark (1)
- Finland (1)
- Germany (3)
- Hungary (1)
- Israel (1)
- Italy (1)
- Lithuania (1)
- Portugal (2)
- Romania (1)
- Russia (2)
- Sweden (1)
- Switzerland (2)
- Ukraine (2)
- United Kingdom (1)
