= Ryo Sato =

Ryo Sato may refer to:

- Ryo Sato (footballer) (佐藤 亮, born 1997), Japanese footballer
- Ryo Sato (high jumper) (佐藤 凌, born 1994), Japanese high jumper
