= Viktor Lonskyy =

Ukrainian high jumper

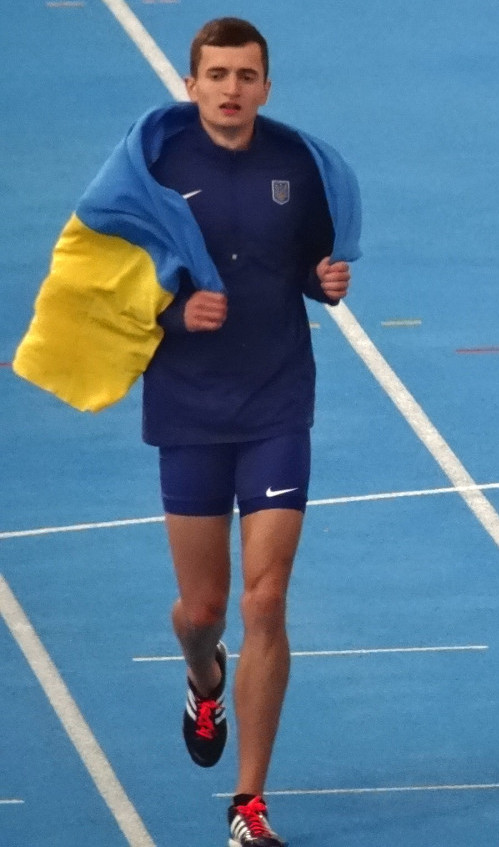
- Viktor Lonskyy in 2017

Personal information
- Full name: Viktor Ihorovych Lonskyy
- Born: 27 October 1995 (age 30) Berdychiv, Ukraine

Sport
- Sport: Athletics
- Event: High jump

Viktor Ihorovych Lonskyy (Ukrainian: Віктор Ігорович Лонський; born 27 October 1995) is a Ukrainian athlete specialising in the high jump.

== Career ==
Lonskyy won a bronze at the 2017 European U23 Championships.

His personal bests in the event are 2.28 metres outdoors (Kropyvnytskiy 2017) and 2.28 metres indoors (Minsk 2017).

== International competitions ==
Year	Competition	Venue	Position	Notes
Representing Ukraine
2013	European Junior Championships	Rieti, Italy	18th (q)	2.03 m
2015	European U23 Championships	Tallinn, Estonia	17th (q)	2.10 m
2017	European U23 Championships	Bydgoszcz, Poland	3rd	2.24 m
2018	European Championships	Berlin, Germany	13th (q)	2.21 m
2019	Universiade	Naples, Italy	11th	2.05 m
