= 2013 European Athletics Junior Championships =

- Dates: 18–21 July
- Host city: Rieti, Italy
- Venue: Stadio Raul Guidobaldi
- Level: Under 20
- Events: 44
- Records set: 3 CRs

The 2013 European Athletics Junior Championships was the 22nd edition of the biennial athletics competition between European athletes in under twenty. It was held in Rieti, Italy from 18 to 21 July.

The medal table was topped by Great Britain with 9 golds, ahead of Russia and Germany.

== Medal summary ==
=== Men ===
Event	Gold		Silver		Bronze	
100 metres	Chijindu Ujah; Great Britain	10.40	Denis Dimitrov; Bulgaria	10.46	Robert Polkowski; Germany	10.53
200 metres	Nethaneel Mitchell-Blake; Great Britain	20.62; PB	Leon Reid; Great Britain	20.92	Matthew Hudson-Smith; Great Britain	20.94
400 metres	Pavel Ivashko; Russia	45.81; NJR	Patryk Dobek; Poland	46.15; PB	Thomas Jordier; France	46.21; NJR
800 metres	Patrick Zwicker; Germany	1:49.58	Aaron Botterman; Belgium	1:49.80	Léo Morgana; France	1:50.04
1500 metres	Jake Wightman; Great Britain	3:44.14	Süleyman Bekmezci; Turkey	3:44.45	Julius Lawnik; Germany	3:45.43
5000 metres	Ali Kaya; Turkey	13:49.76	Samuele Dini; Italy	14:36.25	Jonathan Davies; Great Britain	14:36.62
10,000 metres	Ali Kaya; Turkey	28:31.16; CR NJR	Lorenzo Dini; Italy	29:31.11; PB	Dino Bosnjak; Croatia	29:59.07
110 metres hurdles	Wilhem Belocian; France	13.18; CR AJR	Lorenzo Perini; Italy	13.30; NJR	Brahian Peña; Switzerland	13.31; NJR
400 metres hurdles	Timofey Chalyy; Russia	49.23; CR NJR	Aleksandr Skorobogatko; Russia	50.13	Jacob Paul; Great Britain	50.71; PB
3000 metres steeplechase	Zak Seddon; Great Britain	8:45.91	Viktor Bakharev; Russia	8:47.81	Ersin Tekal; Turkey	8:54.54; PB
4 × 100 metres relay	Tomasz Mudlaff; Jacek Kabaciński; Hubert Kalandyk; Adam Jabłoński; Poland	39.80	Bastian Heber; Robert Polkowski; Maximilian Ruth; Sebastian Schürmann; Germany	39.96	Giacomo Isolano; Lorenzo Bilotti; Roberto Rigali; Fausto Desalu; Italy	40.00
4 × 400 metres relay	Danil Peremetov; Pavel Savin; Dmitriy Khasanov; Pavel Ivashko; Russia	3:04.87 NJR	Paweł Walczuk; Rafał Smoleń; Łukasz Ozdarski; Patryk Dobek; Poland	3:05.07	Alex Boyce; Matthew Hudson-Smith; Ben Snaith; George Caddick; Great Britain	3:05.14
10,000 m walk	Pavel Parshin; Russia	41:01.55	Vito Minei; Italy	41:08.76; PB	Álvaro Martín; Spain	41:13.95; SB
High jump	Tobias Potye; Germany	2.20; PB	Andrei Skabeika; Belarus	2.18 =PB	Mikhail Akimenko; Russia	2.18 =PB
Pole vault	Eirik Greibrokk Dolve; Norway	5.30	Axel Chapelle; France; Leonid Kobelev; Russia	5.25; PB; 5.25		
Long jump	Elliot Safo; Great Britain	7.86; PB	Mathias Broothaerts; Belgium	7.84; PB	Guy-Elphège Anouman; France	7.60; SB
Triple jump	Levon Aghasyan; Armenia	16.01; SB	Kristian Pulli; Finland	15.88; PB	Vladimir Kozlov; Russia	15.85; PB
Shot put	Mesud Pezer; Bosnia and Herzegovina	20.44; NJR	Filip Mihaljevic; Croatia	20.23	Andrzej Regin; Poland	20.07; PB
Discus throw	Róbert Szikszai; Hungary	64.75; NJR	Nicholas Percy; Great Britain	62.04	Aleksandr Dobrenkiy; Russia	61.54; PB
Hammer throw (6 kg)	Valeriy Pronkin; Russia	78.34	Bence Pásztor; Hungary	77.35; PB	Marco Bortolato; Italy	73.43
Javelin throw	Julian Weber; Germany	79.68; PB	Maksym Bohdan; Ukraine	78.77; NJR	German Komarov; Russia	73.95
Decathlon	Yevgeniy Likhanov; Russia	7975; PB	Aleksey Cherkasov; Russia	7790; PB	Tim Nowak; Germany	7778; PB

=== Women ===
Event	Gold		Silver		Bronze	
100 metres	Stella Akakpo; France	11.52	Sophie Papps; Great Britain	11.72	Klára Seidlová; Czech Republic	11.88
200 metres	Dina Asher-Smith; Great Britain	23.29	Desirèe Henry; Great Britain	23.56	Tessa van Schagen; Netherlands	23.65
400 metres	Patrycja Wyciszkiewicz; Poland	51.56; NJR	Bianca Răzor; Romania	51.82; PB	Ekaterina Renzhina; Russia	52.27
800 metres	Aníta Hinriksdóttir; Iceland	2:01.14	Olena Sidorska; Ukraine	2:01.46	Christina Hering; Germany	2:03.11; PB
1500 metres	Nataliya Pryshchepa; Ukraine	4:18.51	Sofia Ennaoui; Poland	4:20.20	Aurora Dybedokken; Norway	4:21.27; PB
3000 metres	Emelia Gorecka; Great Britain	9:12.53; SB	Emine Hatun Tuna; Turkey	9:25.83; PB	Anna Petrova; Russia	9:30.00
5000 metres	Jip Vastenburg; Netherlands	16:03.31	Oona Kettunen; Finland	16:03.79; PB	Rebecca Weston; United Kingdom	16:09.90
100 metres hurdles	Noemi Zbären; Switzerland	13.17	Sarah Lavin; Ireland	13.34; NJR	Héloïse Kane; France	13.36; PB
400 metres hurdles	Hayley McLean; Great Britain	57.26; PB	Joan Medjid; France	57.34; PB	Stina Troest; Denmark	57.41; NJR
3000 metres steeplechase	Oona Kettunen; Finland	9:45.51; NJR	Marusa Mismas; Slovenia	9:51.15; NR, NJR	Maya Rehberg; Germany	10:00.04; PB
4 × 100 metres relay	Yasmin Miller; Dina Asher-Smith; Steffi Wilson; Desirèe Henry; Great Britain	43.81 NJR	Solenn Compper; Stella Akakpo; Brigitte Ntiamoah; Déborah Sananes; France	44.00	Sacha van Agt; Tessa van Schagen; Naomi Sedney; Eefje Boons; Netherlands	44.22
4 × 400 metres relay	Małgorzata Curyło; Martyna Dąbrowska; Adrianna Janowicz; Patrycja Wyciszkiewicz; Poland	3:32.63 NJR	Yana Glotova; Anna Parfenova; Anastasia Aslanidi; Ekaterina Renzhina; Russia	3:33.36	Laura Müller; Maike Schachtschneider; Corinne Kohlmann; Christina Hering; Germany	3:33.40
10,000 m walk	Anežka Drahotová; Czech Republic	44:15.87; PB	Oksana Golyatkina; Russia	44:21.03; PB	Eliska Drahotová; Czech Republic	44:45.27; PB
High jump	Kateryna Tabashnyk; Ukraine	1.90; PB	Alexandra Yaryshkina; Russia	1.88; PB	Iryna Herashchenko; Ukraine	1.84
Pole vault	Alayna Lutkovskaya; Russia	4.30; PB	Femke Pluim; Netherlands	4.25; PB	Sonia Malavisi; Italy	4.20
Long jump	Malaika Mihambo; Germany	6.70; PB	Jazmin Sawyers; Great Britain	6.63; SB	Maryna Bekh; Ukraine	6.44
Triple jump	Ottavia Cestonaro; Italy	13.41	Elena Panturoiu; Romania	13.36; PB	Ana Peleteiro; Spain	13.29; SB
Shot put	Emel Dereli; Turkey	18.04; NR	Sophie McKinna; Great Britain	17.09	Kätlin Piirimäe; Estonia	16.80; NJR
Discus throw	Natalya Shirobokova; Russia	54.21	Karolina Makul; Poland	53.25; PB	Tetyana Yuryeva; Ukraine	53.15
Hammer throw	Hanna Zinchuk; Belarus	65.44	Réka Gyurátz; Hungary	65.01; PB	Beatrix Banga; Hungary	63.89; PB
Javelin throw	Sofi Flinck; Sweden	57.91	Christin Hussong; Germany	57.90; SB	Sara Kolak; Croatia	57.79; NJR, NR
Heptathlon	Nafissatou Thiam; Belgium	6298; NR	Sofia Linde; Sweden	6081	Marjolein Lindemans; Belgium	5831

== Medal table ==
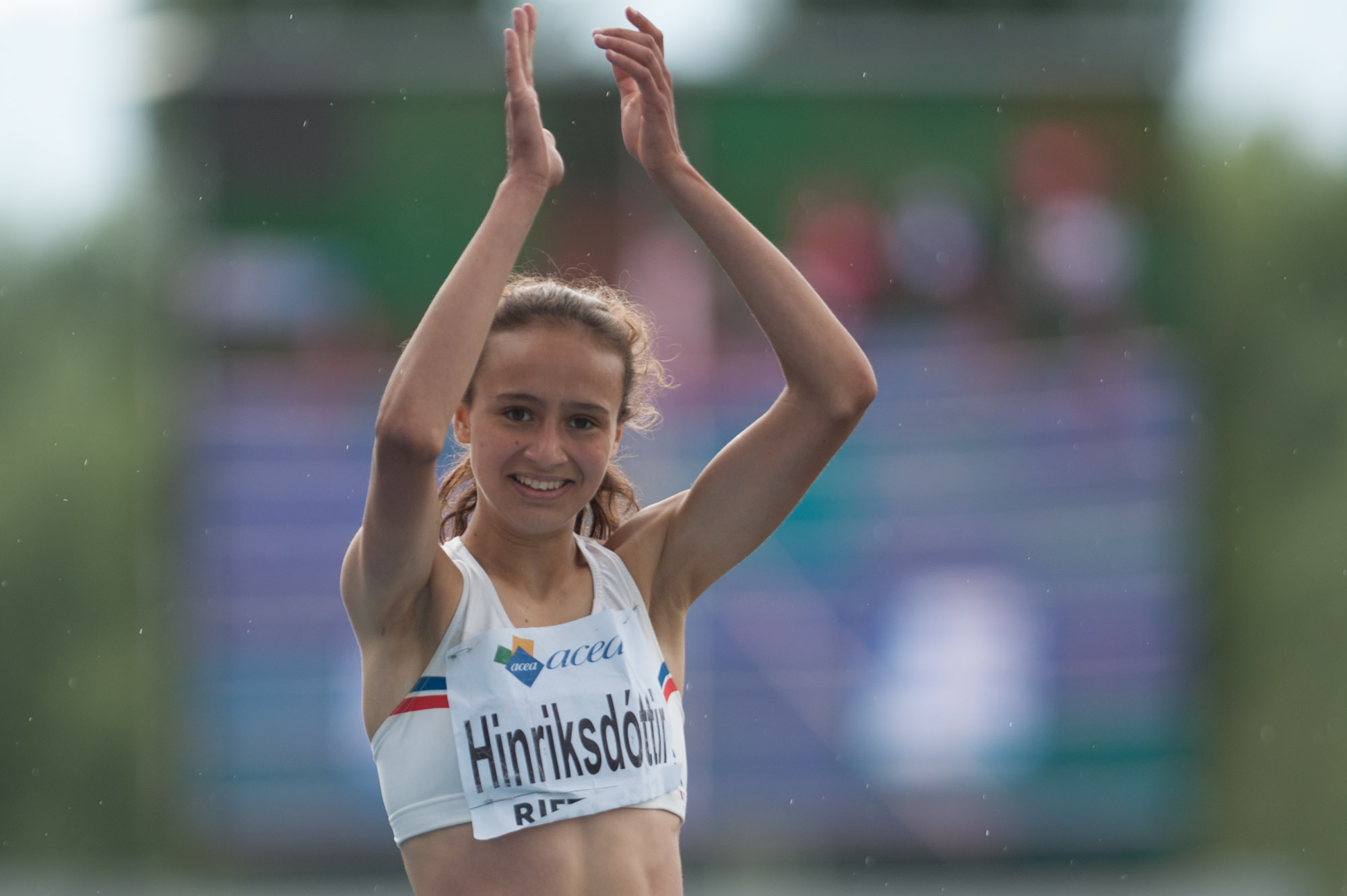
Aníta Hinriksdóttir won the 800 metres gold for Iceland.

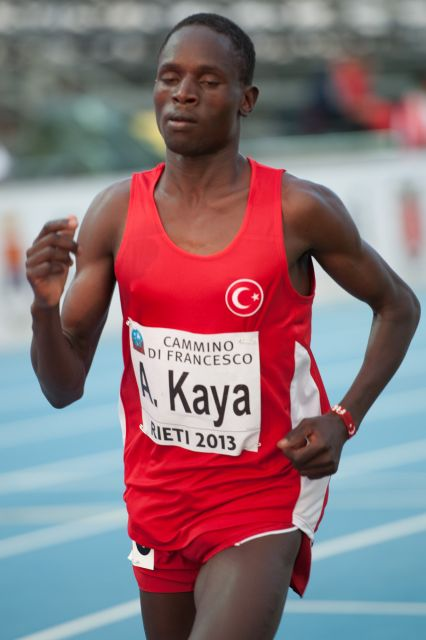
Ali Kaya won the men's 5000 and 10,000 metres.

* Host nation (Italy)

Rank	Nation	Gold	Silver	Bronze	Total
1	Great Britain (GBR)	9	6	5	20
2	Russia (RUS)	8	7	6	21
3	Germany (GER)	4	2	6	12
4	Poland (POL)	3	4	1	8
5	Turkey (TUR)	3	2	1	6
6	France (FRA)	2	3	4	9
7	Ukraine (UKR)	2	2	3	7
8	Italy (ITA)*	1	4	3	8
9	Belgium (BEL)	1	2	1	4
9	Hungary (HUN)	1	2	1	4
11	Finland (FIN)	1	2	0	3
12	Netherlands (NED)	1	1	2	4
13	Belarus (BLR)	1	1	0	2
13	Sweden (SWE)	1	1	0	2
15	Czech Republic (CZE)	1	0	2	3
16	Norway (NOR)	1	0	1	2
16	Switzerland (SUI)	1	0	1	2
18	Armenia (ARM)	1	0	0	1
18	Bosnia and Herzegovina (BIH)	1	0	0	1
18	Iceland (ISL)	1	0	0	1
21	Romania (ROU)	0	2	0	2
22	Croatia (CRO)	0	1	2	3
23	Bulgaria (BUL)	0	1	0	1
23	Ireland (IRL)	0	1	0	1
23	Slovenia (SLO)	0	1	0	1
26	Spain (ESP)	0	0	2	2
27	Denmark (DEN)	0	0	1	1
27	Estonia (EST)	0	0	1	1
Totals (28 entries)		44	45	43	132
