= Breyton Poole =

South African high jumper

Personal information
- Full name: Breyton Avron Poole
- Born: 23 March 2000 (age 26) Somerset West, Cape Town, South Africa
- Height: 172 cm (5 ft 8 in)
- Weight: 63 kg (139 lb)
Medal record
Men's athletics
Representing South Africa
African Games
Bronze medal – third place	2019 Rabat	High jump

Breyton Avron Poole (born 23 March 2000) is a South African high jumper.

He won the gold medal at the 2017 World U18 Championships, the bronze medal at the 2018 World U20 Championships, the bronze medal at 2019 African Games, the gold medal at the 2019 African U20 Championships and finished fourth at the 2019 Summer Universiade. He also competed at the 2018 Commonwealth Games without reaching the final.
