= Marjolein Lindemans =

Belgian athletics competitor

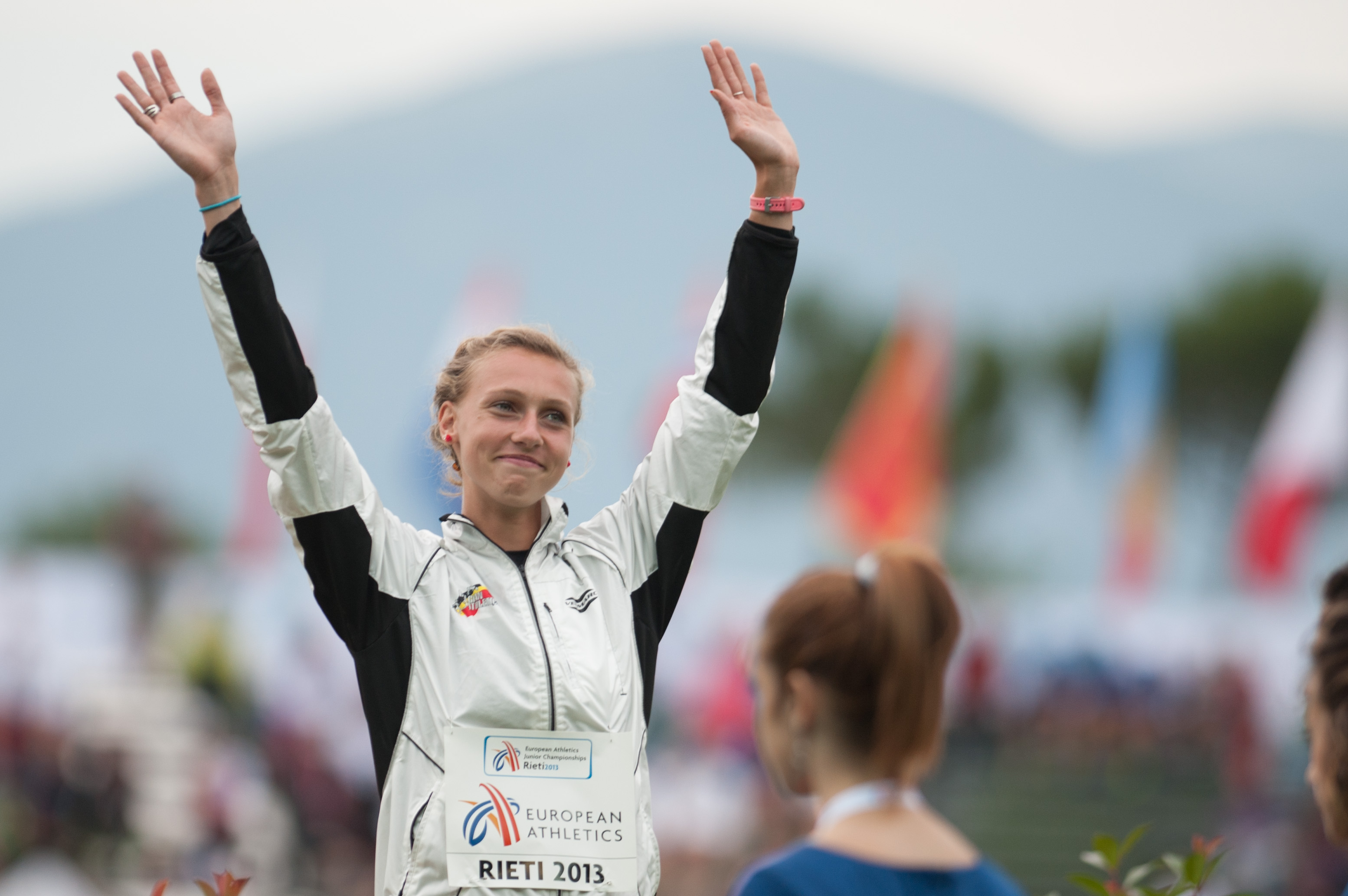
- Lindemans at 2013 European U20 Championships

Personal information
- Born: 17 February 1994 (age 32) Leuven, Belgium

Sport
- Country: Belgium
- Sport: Track and field
- Event: Heptathlon
Medal record
Track and field
Representing Belgium
World U18 Championships
Bronze medal – third place	2011 Lille	Girls' heptathlon
European U20 Championships
Bronze medal – third place	2013 Rieti	Women's heptathlon

Marjolein Lindemans (born 17 February 1994) is a Belgian former heptathlete who competed in international elite events. She is a World and European bronze medalist and a Belgian champion in the long jump and pentathlon.
