= Qatar at the 2017 World Championships in Athletics =

- WA code: QAT

in London
- Competitors: 5 in 5 events
- Medals Ranked =17th: Gold 1 Silver 0 Bronze 1 Total 2

World Championships in Athletics appearances
- 1983; 1987; 1991; 1993; 1995; 1997; 1999; 2001; 2003; 2005; 2007; 2009; 2011; 2013; 2015; 2017; 2019; 2022; 2023; 2025

Qatar competed at the 2017 World Championships in Athletics in London, United Kingdom, from 4–13 August 2017.

== Medalists ==
The following Qatari competitors won medals at the Championships:

Medal	Athlete	Event	Date
Gold	Mutaz Essa Barshim	Men's high jump	13 August
Bronze	Abdalelah Haroun	Men's 400 metres	8 August

== Results ==
(q – qualified, NM – no mark, SB – season best)

=== Men ===
Track and road events

Athlete	Event	Heat		Semifinal		Final	
Athlete	Event	Result	Rank	Result	Rank	Result	Rank
Abdalelah Haroun	400 metres	45.27	15 Q	44.64 SB	8 q	44.48 SB	3rd place, bronze medalist(s)
Abderrahaman Samba	400 metres hurdles	49.39	5 Q	48.75	5 Q	49.74	7

Field events

Athlete	Event	Qualification		Final	
Athlete	Event	Distance	Position	Distance	Position
Mutaz Essa Barshim	High jump	2.31	1 Q	2.35	1st place, gold medalist(s)
Ahmed Bader Magour	Javelin throw	83.83	11 Q	81.77	10
Ashraf Amgad Elseify	Hammer throw	71.87	23	Did not advance	
