= Norbert Kobielski =

Polish high jumper (born 1997)

Personal information
- Born: 28 January 1997 (age 29)
- Height: 2.02 m (6 ft 8 in)
- Weight: 80 kg (176 lb)

Sport
- Sport: Athletics
- Event: High jump
- Club: MKS Inowrocław
- Coached by: Dariusz Niemczyn (–2018); Lech Krakowiak (2018–)
Medal record
Athletics
Representing Poland
European Games
| Bronze medal – third place | 2023 Kraków-Małopolska | High jump |

Norbert Kobielski (born 28 January 1997) is a Polish athlete specialising in the high jump. He won a bronze medal at the 2019 European U23 Championships.

His personal bests are 2.33 metres outdoors (Eugene 2023) and 2.29 metres indoors (Toruń 2020, Instambul 2023).

After being suspended in July 2024, Kobielski was issued with a two-year ban by the Athletics Integrity Unit set to end in July 2026 for an anti-doping rule violation after testing positive for pentedrone at an event in Poland. All of his results after 26 May 2024, including his sixth position in the European Championships were disqualified.

== International competitions ==
| Year | Competition | Venue | Position | Notes |
Representing Poland
| 2015 | European Junior Championships | Eskilstuna, Sweden | 7th (q) | 2.11 m^{1} |
| 2017 | European U23 Championships | Bydgoszcz, Poland | 8th | 2.19 m |
| 2017 | Universiade | Taipei, Taiwan | 10th | 2.15 m |
| 2019 | European Indoor Championships | Glasgow, United Kingdom | 18th (q) | 2.10 m |
| 2019 | European U23 Championships | Gävle, Sweden | 3rd | 2.23 m |
| 2019 | Military World Games | Wuhan, China | 8th | 2.05 m |
| 2022 | World Indoor Championships | Belgrade, Serbia | 9th | 2.24 m |
| 2022 | World Championships | Eugene, United States | – | NM |
| 2023 | European Indoor Championships | Istanbul, Turkey | 5th | 2.26 m |
| 2023 | World Championships | Budapest, Hungary | 10th | 2.25 m |
| 2024 | World Indoor Championships | Glasgow, United Kingdom | 7th | 2.24 m |
| 2024 | European Championships | Rome, Italy | DQ | ~~2.22 m~~ |

^{1}No mark in the final
