= Andrei Skabeika =

Belarusian high jumper

Personal information
- Full name: Andrei Syarheyevich Skabeika
- Born: 11 June 1995 (age 31)

Sport
- Sport: Athletics
- Event: High jump
- Club: BFST Dynamo

Andrei Syarheyevich Skabeika (Belarusian: А́ндрэй Сярге́евіч Скабе́йка, Russian: А́ндрей Серге́евич Скабе́йко; born 11 June 1995) is a Belarusian athlete specialising in the high jump. He won the silver medal at the 2013 European Junior Championships.

In 2019, he won the silver medal in the team event at the 2019 European Games held in Minsk, Belarus.

His personal bests in the event are 2.26 metres outdoors (Brest 2014) and 2.26 metres indoors (Gomel 2018).

== International competitions ==
Year	Competition	Venue	Position	Notes
Representing Belarus
2013	European Junior Championships	Rieti, Italy	2nd	2.18 m
2014	World Junior Championships	Eugene, United States	11th	2.10 m
2015	European U23 Championships	Tallinn, Estonia	13th (q)	2.15 m
2017	European U23 Championships	Bydgoszcz, Poland	7th	2.19 m
2018	European Championships	Berlin, Germany	26th (q)	2.11 m
2019	European Indoor Championships	Glasgow, United Kingdom	12th (q)	2.21 m
2019	Universiade	Naples, Italy	8th	2.18 m
