= Stefano Sottile =

Italian high jumper

Personal information
- Nationality: Italian
- Born: 26 January 1998 (age 28) Borgosesia
- Height: 1.82 m (6 ft 0 in)
- Weight: 63 kg (139 lb)

Sport
- Sport: Athletics
- Event: High jump
- Club: Fiamme Azzurre

Achievements and titles
- Personal bests: High jump outdoor: 2.34 m (2024); High jump indoor: 2.24 m (2018)
Medal record
European Team Championships
Bronze medal – third place	2019 Bydgoszcz	High jump
World Youth Championships
Gold medal – first place	2015 Cali	High jump

Stefano Sottile (born 26 January 1998) is an Italian high jumper who competed at the 2020 and 2024 Summer Olympics.

== Career ==
He won a gold medal at the 2015 World Youth Championships in Athletics, finished fourth at the 2019 European U23 Championships and third at the 2019 European Team Championships Super League. He also competed at the 2016 World U20 Championships and the 2019 World Championships without reaching the final. During the 2019 Italian Athletics Championships he established a World Lead jump of 2.33 m, also a qualifying standard for the 2020 Summer Games.

== National titles ==
He has won 4 national titles at individual senior level.

- Italian Athletics Championships
  - High jump: 2019 (with 2.33 m WL), 2023
- Italian Indoor Athletics Championships
  - High jump: 2018, 2023

== Progression ==
=== Outdoor ===
Season	Height	Location	Date
2020	2.19 m	(Italy) Padua	29 August
2019	2.33 m	(Italy) Brixen	28 July
2018	2.20 m	(Italy) Castiglione	13 May
2017	2.14 m	(Italy) Florence	13 May
2016	2.18 m	(Italy) Brixen	18 July
2015	2.20 m	(Colombia) Cali	18 July
2015	2.20 m	(Italy) Turin	10 May
2014	2.15 m	(Italy) Biella	4 May
2013	1.98 m	(Italy) Jesolo	13 October
2012	1.75 m	(Italy) Jesolo	7 October
2011	1.78 m	(Italy) Novara	28 May
2010	1.65 m	(Italy) Gaglianico	8 May
2009	1.47 m	(Italy) Novara	10 May
2008	1.34 m	(Italy) Borgosesia	5 April
2007	1.18 m	(Italy) Gaglianico	28 April
2006	1.05 m	(Italy) Biella	28 October

=== Indoor ===
Season	Height	Location	Date
2020/21	2.16 m	(Italy) Ancona	21 February 2021
2019/20	not disputed		
2018/19	not disputed		
2017/18	2.24 m	(Italy) Ancona	16 February 2018
2016/17	2.13 m	(Italy) Ancona	19 February 2017
2015/16	2.22 m	(Italy) Padua	27 February 2016
2014/15	2.14 m	(Italy) Aosta	18 January 2015
2013/14	2.05 m	(Italy) Ancona	16 February 2014
2012/13	1.90 m	(Italy) Modena	10 March 2013
2011/12	1.70 m	(Italy) Modena	18 March 2012
2010/11	1.65 m	(Italy) Aosta	27 February 2011
2009/10	1.60 m	(Italy) Aosta	28 February 2010

== Achievements ==
Year	Competition	Location	Event	Position	Measure	Notes
2014	Summer Youth Olympics	(China) Nanjing	High Jump	6th	2.02 m	
2014	Summer Youth Olympics	(China) Nanjing	8 x 100 m	5th	1'45"02	
2015	World Youth Championships	(Colombia) Cali	High Jump	1st	2.20 m	
2016	World U20 Championships	(Poland) Bydgoszcz	High Jump	18th	2.09 m	
2017	European U20 Championships	(Italy) Grosseto	High Jump	20th	2.05 m	
2018	Mediterranean U23 Championships	(Italy) Jesolo	High Jump	2nd	2.19 m	
2019	European U23 Championships	(Sweden) Gävle	High Jump	4th	2.20 m	
2019	World Championships	(Qatar) Doha	High Jump	16th	2.26 m	
2021	2020 Olympic Games	(Japan) Tokyo	High Jump	26th	2.17 m	
2024	2024 Olympic Games	(France) Paris	High Jump	4th	2.34 m	

== National titles ==
Sottile won five national championships at individual senior level.

- Italian Athletics Championships
  - High jump: 2019, 2023, 2024 (3)
- Italian Athletics Indoor Championships
  - High jump: 2018, 2023 (2)
