= Qatar at the 2013 World Championships in Athletics =

- WA code: QAT

in Moscow
- Competitors: 5
- Medals Ranked 26th: Gold 0 Silver 1 Bronze 0 Total 1

World Championships in Athletics appearances
- 1983; 1987; 1991; 1993; 1995; 1997; 1999; 2001; 2003; 2005; 2007; 2009; 2011; 2013; 2015; 2017; 2019; 2022; 2023; 2025

Qatar competed at the 2013 World Championships in Athletics in Moscow, Russia, from 10 to 18 August 2013. A team of five athletes was announced to represent the country in the event.

== Medalists ==
The following competitors from Qatar won medals at the Championships

Medal	Athlete	Event
Silver	Mutaz Essa Barshim	High jump

== Results ==
=== Men ===
Athlete	Event	Qualification		Final	
Athlete	Event	Distance	Position	Distance	Position
Mutaz Essa Barshim	High jump	2.29 q	6	2.38	2nd place, silver medalist(s)
