= 2019 European Athletics U23 Championships – Men's high jump =

The men's high jump event at the 2019 European Athletics U23 Championships was held in Gävle, Sweden, at Gavlehof Stadium Park on 13 and 14 July.

== Medalists ==
| Gold | Silver | Bronze |
|---|---|---|
| Maksim Nedasekau; Belarus | Tom Gale; Great Britain | Norbert Kobielski; Poland |

== Results ==
=== Qualification ===
Qualification rule: 2.19 (Q) or the 12 best results (q) qualified for the final.

| Rank | Group | Name | Nationality | 1.97 | 2.02 | 2.07 | 2.12 | 2.16 | Results | Notes |
|---|---|---|---|---|---|---|---|---|---|---|
| 1 | A | Alperen Acet | Turkey | – | – | o | o | o | 2.16 | q |
| 1 | B | Norbert Kobielski | Poland | – | – | o | o | o | 2.16 | q |
| 1 | B | Maksim Nedasekau | Belarus | – | – | – | – | o | 2.16 | q |
| 1 | B | Jonas Wagner | Germany | – | o | o | o | o | 2.16 | q |
| 5 | A | Jasmin Halili | Serbia | – | o | o | xo | o | 2.16 | q, =SB |
| 5 | B | Marek Bahník | Czech Republic | o | o | o | xo | o | 2.16 | q |
| 5 | B | Stefano Sottile | Italy | – | – | xo | o | o | 2.16 | q |
| 8 | A | Tom Gale | Great Britain | – | – | – | xxo | o | 2.16 | q |
| 9 | B | Dmytro Nikitin | Ukraine | – | – | o | o | xo | 2.16 | q |
| 10 | A | Dorian Lairi | France | – | o | o | xo | xo | 2.16 | q |
| 11 | A | Adonios Merlos | Greece | – | o | o | xxo | xo | 2.16 | q |
| 12 | A | Josef Adámek | Czech Republic | o | o | xo | o | xo | 2.16 | q, =PB |
| 13 | B | Maid Redžić | Bosnia and Herzegovina | – | o | o | o | xxx | 2.12 | |
| 13 | B | Simon Wiklund | Sweden | o | o | o | o | xxx | 2.12 | |
| 15 | B | Metin Doğu | Turkey | – | xxo | xo | o | xxx | 2.12 | |
| 16 | B | Nathan Ismar | France | – | xxo | o | xxo | xxx | 2.12 | |
| 17 | B | Filip Mrčić | Croatia | o | o | o | xxx | | 2.07 | |
| 18 | A | Illya Oliferovskyy | Ukraine | o | xo | o | xxx | | 2.07 | |
| 19 | A | Enes Talha Şenses | Turkey | xo | xo | o | xxx | | 2.07 | |
| 20 | A | Eduard Fabregas | Spain | o | o | xo | xxx | | 2.07 | |
| 20 | B | Roman Kuzminov | Ukraine | – | – | xo | xxx | | 2.07 | |
| 22 | A | Péter Agárdi | Hungary | – | o | xxx | | | 2.02 | |
| 22 | A | Mikhail Ivanov | Bulgaria | o | o | xxx | | | 2.02 | |
| 22 | B | Dainius Pazdrazdis | Lithuania | o | o | xxx | | | 2.02 | |
| 25 | A | Donagh Mahon | Ireland | o | xxo | xxx | | | 2.02 | |
| 26 | A | Lars Van Looy | Belgium | xo | xxo | xxx | | | 2.02 | |

=== Final ===
| Rank | Name | Nationality | 2.01 | 2.06 | 2.11 | 2.16 | 2.20 | 2.23 | 2.25 | 2.27 | 2.29 | 2.31 | 2.29 | Result | Notes |
|---|---|---|---|---|---|---|---|---|---|---|---|---|---|---|---|
| 1st place, gold medalist(s) | Maksim Nedasekau | Belarus | – | – | – | xo | – | o | x– | o | xx– | x | o | 2.29 | =SB |
| 2nd place, silver medalist(s) | Tom Gale | Great Britain | – | – | o | o | o | xxo | o | o | xxx | | x | 2.27 | |
| 3rd place, bronze medalist(s) | Norbert Kobielski | Poland | – | – | o | o | xo | xo | xx– | x | | | | 2.23 | |
| 4 | Stefano Sottile | Italy | – | – | o | xo | o | xxx | | | | | | 2.20 | |
| 5 | Jasmin Halili | Serbia | o | o | o | – | xo | xxx | | | | | | 2.20 | PB |
| 6 | Jonas Wagner | Germany | – | o | o | xo | xxo | xxx | | | | | | 2.20 | |
| 7 | Dmytro Nikitin | Ukraine | – | – | o | o | xxx | | | | | | | 2.16 | |
| 8 | Marek Bahník | Czech Republic | o | o | xo | xxo | xx– | x | | | | | | 2.16 | |
| 9 | Alperen Acet | Turkey | – | – | o | xxx | | | | | | | | 2.11 | |
| 9 | Dorian Lairi | France | – | o | o | xxx | | | | | | | | 2.11 | |
| 9 | Adonios Merlos | Greece | – | o | o | xxx | | | | | | | | 2.11 | |
| 12 | Josef Adámek | Czech Republic | o | o | xo | xxx | | | | | | | | 2.11 | |
