= Qatar at the 2015 World Championships in Athletics =

- WA code: QAT

in Beijing
- Competitors: 6
- Medals: Gold 0 Silver 0 Bronze 0 Total 0

World Championships in Athletics appearances
- 1983; 1987; 1991; 1993; 1995; 1997; 1999; 2001; 2003; 2005; 2007; 2009; 2011; 2013; 2015; 2017; 2019; 2022; 2023; 2025

Qatar competed at the 2015 World Championships in Athletics in Beijing, China, from 22–30 August 2015.

== Results ==
(q – qualified, NM – no mark, SB – season best)

=== Men ===
Track and road events

Athlete	Event	Heat		Semifinal		Final	
Athlete	Event	Result	Rank	Result	Rank	Result	Rank
Femi Ogunode	100 metres	9.99	1 Q	10.00	3	Did not advance	
Femi Ogunode	200 metres	20.25 SB	2 Q	20.05 NR	3 q	20.27	7
Musaeb Abdulrahman Balla	800 metres	1:48.59	3 Q	1:47.93	2 Q	1:47.01	6
Jamal Hairane	800 metres	1:48.96	6	Did not advance			
Hashim Salah Mohamed	3000 metres steeplechase	9:17.35	12	—N/a		Did not advance	

Field events

Athlete	Event	Qualification		Final	
Athlete	Event	Distance	Position	Distance	Position
Mutaz Essa Barshim	High jump	2.31	3 Q	2.33	4
Ashraf Amgad Elseify	Hammer throw	76.51	5 q	74.09	9
