= Joel Baden =

Australian high jumper

Personal information
- Born: 1 February 1996 (age 30) Geelong, Victoria, Australia
- Height: 1.90 m (6 ft 3 in)
- Weight: 70 kg (154 lb)

Sport
- Country: Australia
- Sport: Athletics
- Event: High jump
- Club: Melbourne University; Athletics Club
- Coached by: Sandro Bisetto

Achievements and titles
- Personal best: High jump: 2.33 (2023)
Medal record
Men's athletics
Representing Australia
Oceania Athletics Championships
Bronze medal – third place	2024 Suva	High jump
- Updated on 29 August 2015

Joel Baden (born 1 February 1996) is an Australian high jumper. A member of Australia's track and field squad at the 2015 IAAF World Championships and 2016 Summer Olympics, he cleared an extraordinary 2.29-metre mark twice as his personal best at the 2014 junior national meet in Melbourne, and at the North Queensland Games in Cairns two months before his maiden Games. Baden currently trains for the University of Melbourne's athletics club under the tutelage of his coach and mentor Sandro Bisetto.

At the 2016 Summer Olympics in Rio de Janeiro, Baden competed for Australia, along with his fellow countryman Brandon Starc, in the men's high jump. Booking a berth on the nation's track and field team for the Games, Baden jumped a height of 2.29 metres to match his personal best that he set two years earlier in Melbourne and to attain the IAAF Olympic entry standard at the North Queensland Games in Cairns. During the qualifying phase, Baden entered a height of 2.17 at his second attempt, but he could not trump the 2.20-metre barrier with all three failing attempts, ending his campaign quickly in a forty-first-place tie with Israel's Dmitry Kroyter.

== Competition record ==
Year	Competition	Venue	Position	Notes
Representing Australia
2014	World Junior Championships	Eugene, United States	8th	2.17 m
2015	World Championships	Beijing, China	21st (q)	2.26 m
2016	Olympic Games	Rio de Janeiro, Brazil	41st (q)	2.17 m
2018	Commonwealth Games	Gold Coast, Australia	17th (q)	2.15 m
2019	World Championships	Doha, Qatar	25th (q)	2.17 m
2022	World Championships	Eugene, United States	10th	2.27 m
2023	World Championships	Budapest, Hungary	32nd (q)	2.14 m
2024	Olympic Games	Paris, France	27th (q)	2.15 m
