= Qatar at the 2022 World Athletics Championships =

- Flag of Qatar
- WA code: QAT

in Eugene, United States 15 July 2022 – 24 July 2022
- Competitors: 3 (3 men)
- Medals Ranked 22nd: Gold 1 Silver 0 Bronze 0 Total 1

World Athletics Championships appearances
- 1983; 1987; 1991; 1993; 1995; 1997; 1999; 2001; 2003; 2005; 2007; 2009; 2011; 2013; 2015; 2017; 2019; 2022; 2023; 2025

Qatar competed at the 2022 World Athletics Championships in Eugene, United States, from 15 to 24 July 2022.

== Results ==
Qatar entered 3 athletes.

Key

- Q = Qualified for the next round
- q = Qualified for the next round as a fastest loser or, in field events, by position without achieving the qualifying target
- NR = National record
- PB = Personal best
- SB = Season best
- N/A = Round not applicable for the event

=== Men ===
Track and road events

Athlete	Event	Preliminary		Heat		Semi-final		Final	
Athlete	Event	Result	Rank	Result	Rank	Result	Rank	Result	Rank
Femi Ogunode	100 metres	—		10.52 (+0.6)	48	did not advance			
Femi Ogunode	200 metres	—		DNS		did not advance			
Adam Ali Musab	1500 metres	—		DNS		did not advance			

Field events

Athlete	Event	Qualification		Final	
Athlete	Event	Distance	Position	Distance	Position
Mutaz Essa Barshim	High jump	2.28	=1	2.37	(gold) WL
