= Malaysia at the 2017 World Championships in Athletics =

- WA code: MAS

in London
- Competitors: 1 (1 man) in 1 event
- Medals: Gold 0 Silver 0 Bronze 0 Total 0

World Championships in Athletics appearances
- 1983; 1987; 1991; 1993; 1995; 1997; 1999; 2001; 2003; 2005; 2007; 2009; 2011; 2013; 2015; 2017; 2019; 2022; 2023; 2025

Malaysia competed at the 2017 World Championships in Athletics in London, United Kingdom, from 4–13 August 2017.

== Results ==
(q – qualified, NM – no mark, SB – season best)

=== Men ===
Field events

Athlete	Event	Qualification		Final	
Athlete	Event	Distance	Position	Distance	Position
Nauraj Singh Randhawa	High jump	2.26	=20	Did not advance	
