= Malaysia at the 2022 World Athletics Championships =

Malaysia at the 2022 World Championships in Athletics
- WA code: MAS
- National federation: Malaysia Athletics Federation
- Website: mafmalaysia.com

in Eugene, United States July 15, 2022 – July 24, 2022
- Competitors: 2 (1 man and 1 woman)

World Championships in Athletics appearances
- 1983; 1987; 1991; 1993; 1995; 1997; 1999; 2001; 2003; 2005; 2007; 2009; 2011; 2013; 2015; 2017; 2019; 2022; 2023

Malaysia competed at the 2022 World Athletics Championships in Eugene, Oregon, from 15 to 24 July. Malaysia has entered 2 athletes

== Results ==
Key

- Q = Qualified for the next round
- q = Qualified for the next round as a fastest loser or, in field events, by position without achieving the qualifying target
- NR = National record
- PB = Personal best
- SB = Season best
- N/A = Round not applicable for the event
- NM = No mark

=== Men ===
Field event

Athlete	Event	Qualification		Final	
Athlete	Event	Distance	Position	Distance	Position
Nauraj Singh Randhawa	High jump	NM	—	Did not advance	

=== Women ===
Track event

Athlete	Event	Heat		Semi-final		Final	
Athlete	Event	Result	Rank	Result	Rank	Result	Rank
Shereen Vallabouy	400 metres	53.57	7	Did not advance			
