= Tobias Potye =

German high jumper (born 1995)

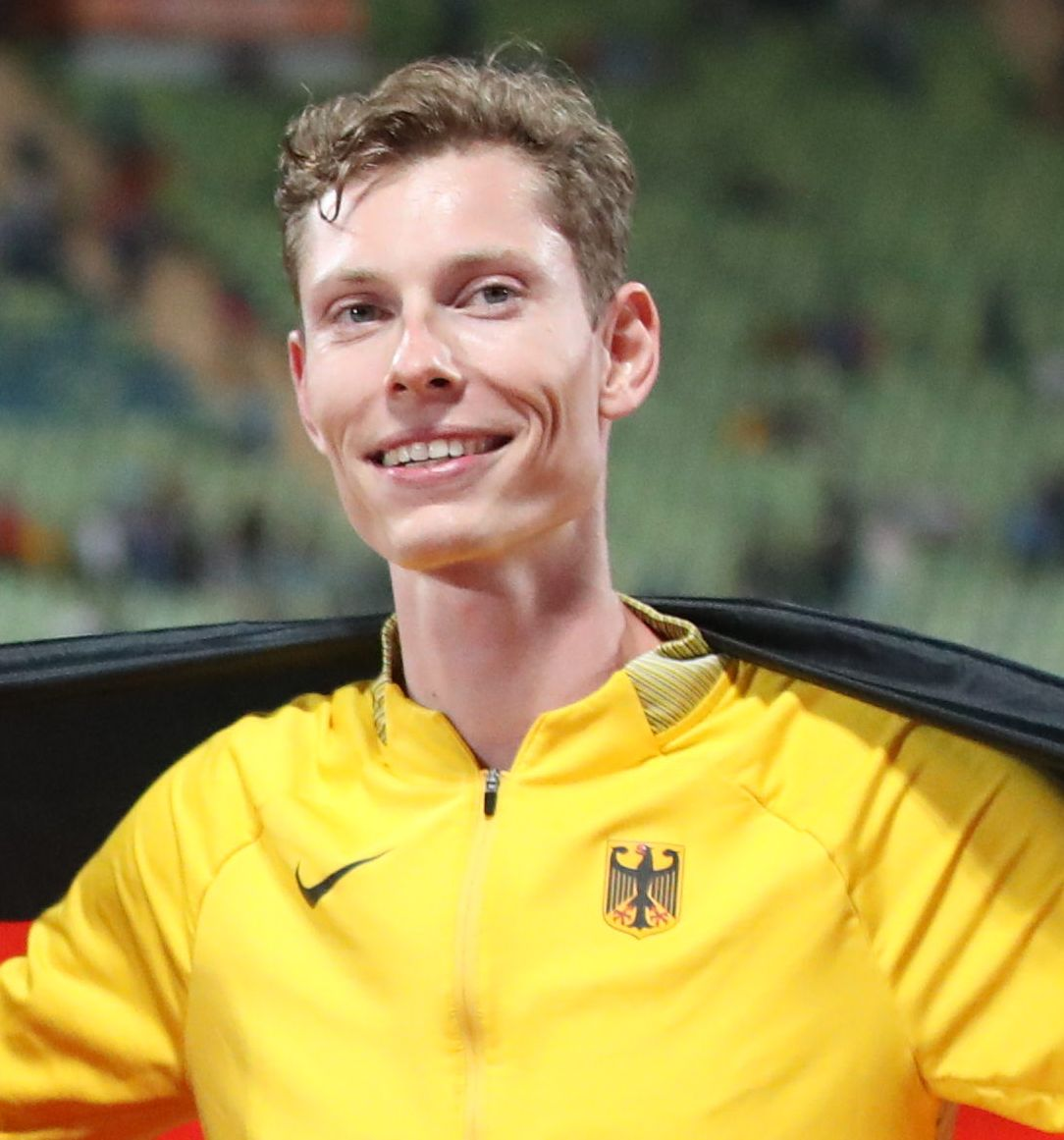
- Potye in 2022

Personal information
- Born: 16 March 1995 (age 31) Munich, Germany
- Height: 1.98 m (6 ft 6 in)
- Weight: 72 kg (159 lb)

Sport
- Sport: Athletics
- Event: High jump
- Club: Cologne Athletics; LG Stadtwerke München; USC München
- Coached by: Sebastian Kneifel, Manfred Knopp, Max Mühlbauer
Medal record
Men's athletics
Representing Germany
European Championships
Silver medal – second place	2022 Munich	High jump

Tobias Potye (born 16 March 1995) is a German athlete specialising in the high jump. He won the gold medal at the 2013 European Junior Championships. At the European Athletics Championships of Munich he won a silver medal in high jump.

His personal bests in the event are 2.34 metres outdoors (Chorzów 2023) and 2.27 metres indoors (Toruń 2023).

== International competitions ==
Year	Competition	Venue	Position	Notes
Representing Germany
2013	European Junior Championships	Rieti, Italy	1st	2.20 m
2014	World Junior Championships	Eugene, United States	9th	2.17 m
2015	European U23 Championships	Tallinn, Estonia	8th	2.18 m
2017	European U23 Championships	Bydgoszcz, Poland	10th	2.10 m
2018	World Cup	London, United Kingdom	3rd	2.24 m
2018	European Championships	Berlin, Germany	16th (q)	2.21 m
2021	European Indoor Championships	Toruń, Poland	4th	2.26 m
2022	World Championships	Eugene, United States	19th (q)	2.21 m
2022	European Championships	Munich, Germany	2nd	2.27 m
2023	European Indoor Championships	Istanbul, Turkey	4th	2.26 m
2023	World Championships	Budapest, Hungary	5th	2.33 m
2024	Olympic Games	Paris, France	–	NM
2025	European Indoor Championships	Apeldoorn, Netherlands	6th	2.17 m
2025	World Championships	Tokyo, Japan	22nd (q)	2.16 m
