= Alperen Acet =

Turkish high jumper (born 1998)

Personal information
- Born: 2 April 1998 (age 28) Nazilli, Aydın, Turkey
- Height: 1.89 m (6 ft 2 in)
- Weight: 80 kg (176 lb)

Sport
- Country: Turkey
- Sport: Athletics
- Event: High jump
- Club: Fenerbahçe Athletics
Medal record
Universiade
Silver medal – second place	2019 Naples	High jump

Alperen Acet (born 2 April 1998) is a Turkish athlete specialising in the high jump. He finished fifth at the 2018 European Championships.

== Career ==
His personal bests in the event are 2.30 metres outdoors (Cluj-Napoca 2018 – current national record) and 2.16 metres indoors (Belgrade 2017). He won the silver medal at the 2019 Summer Universiade held in Naples, Italy jumping 2.24 m.

== International competitions ==
Year	Competition	Venue	Position	Notes
Representing Turkey
2014	World Junior Championships	Eugene, United States	21st (q)	2.00 m
2014	Youth Olympic Games	Nanjing, China	9th (q)	2.07 m
2015	World Youth Championships	Cali, Colombia	4th	2.14 m
2016	Mediterranean U23 Championships	Tunis, Tunisia	3rd	2.08 m
2016	World U20 Championships	Bydgoszcz, Poland	12th	2.14 m
2017	Islamic Solidarity Games	Baku, Azerbaijan	5th	2.19 m
2017	European U20 Championships	Grosseto, Italy	4th	2.22 m
2018	Mediterranean U23 Championships	Jesolo, Italy	3rd	2.16 m
2018	European Championships	Berlin, Germany	5th	2.24 m
2019	European Indoor Championships	Glasgow, United Kingdom	12th (q)	2.21 m
2019	Universiade	Naples, Italy	2nd	2.24 m
2019	European U23 Championships	Gävle, Sweden	9th	2.11 m
2022	Mediterranean Games	Oran, Algeria	9th	2.13 m
2023	World University Games	Chengdu, China	9th	2.15 m
2023	World Championships	Budapest, Hungary	23rd (q)	2.22 m
2024	European Championships	Rome, Italy	10th	2.22 m
2024	Olympic Games	Paris, France	22nd (q)	2.20 m
2025	European Indoor Championships	Apeldoorn, Netherlands	7th	2.17 m
