= Malaysia at the 2009 World Championships in Athletics =

- WA code: MAS

in Berlin
- Competitors: 2 (1 man, 1 woman)
- Medals: Gold 0 Silver 0 Bronze 0 Total 0

World Championships in Athletics appearances
- 1983; 1987; 1991; 1993; 1995; 1997; 1999; 2001; 2003; 2005; 2007; 2009; 2011; 2013; 2015; 2017; 2019; 2022; 2023

Malaysia competes at the 2009 World Championships in Athletics from 15 to 23 August in Berlin.

== Team selection ==
Track and road events

Event	Athletes	
Event	Men	Women
110 metre hurdles	Rayzam Shah Wan Sofian	

Field and combined events

Event	Athletes	
Event	Men	Women
Pole vault		Roslinda Samsu
