= Qatar at the 2019 World Athletics Championships =

- WA code: QAT

in Doha, Qatar
- Competitors: 16 (14 men and 2 women) in 12 events
- Medals Ranked 16th: Gold 1 Silver 0 Bronze 1 Total 2

World Athletics Championships appearances
- 1983; 1987; 1991; 1993; 1995; 1997; 1999; 2001; 2003; 2005; 2007; 2009; 2011; 2013; 2015; 2017; 2019; 2022; 2023

Qatar competed at the 2019 World Athletics Championships in Doha, Qatar from 27 September to 6 October 2019. The country finished in 16th place in the medal table.

== Medalists ==
Medal	Athlete	Event	Date
Gold	Mutaz Essa Barshim	Men's high jump	October 4
Bronze	Abderrahman Samba	Men's 400 metres hurdles	September 30

== Results ==
(q – qualified, NM – no mark, SB – season best)

=== Men ===
Track and road events

Athlete	Event	Preliminary		Heat		Semifinal		Final	
Athlete	Event	Result	Rank	Result	Rank	Result	Rank	Result	Rank
Owaab Barrow	100 m	10.64 PB	8 q	12.82	45	did not advance			
Abdelaziz Mohamed	200 m	—		20.75 SB	37	did not advance			
Abdalelah Haroun	400 m	—		47.76 SB	37	did not advance			
Abubaker Haydar Abdalla	800 m	—		1:46.11	15 Q	1:46.87	21	did not advance	
Jamal Hairane	800 m	—		1:46.40	24	did not advance			
Abdirahman Saeed Hassan	1500 m	—		3:42.24	37	did not advance			
Yaser Bagharab	3000 m steeplechase	—		8:39.65	40	—		did not advance	
Abderrahman Samba	400 m hurdles	—		49.08	1 Q	48.72	8 Q	48.03	3rd place, bronze medalist(s)
	4 × 100 m relay	—		did not start		—		did not advance	
Bassem Hemeida; Abubaker Haydar Abdalla; Ashraf Hussein Osman; Mohamed Nasir Abbas	4 × 400 m relay	—		3:06.25	15	—		did not advance	

Field events

Athlete	Event	Qualification		Final	
Athlete	Event	Result	Rank	Result	Rank
Mutaz Essa Barshim	High jump	2.29 SB	1 q	2.37 WL	1st place, gold medalist(s)
Ashraf Amgad El-Seify	Hammer throw	76.22 SB	12 q	75.41	9

=== Women ===
Track and road events

Athlete	Event	Heat		Semifinal		Final	
Athlete	Event	Result	Rank	Result	Rank	Result	Rank
Kenza Sosse	400 m	1:06.76	47	did not advance			
Mariam Mamdouh Farid	400 m hurdles	1:09.49 SB	36	did not advance			
