= Jasmin Halili =

Serbian high jumper

Personal information
- Nationality: Serbian
- Born: 1 March 1999 (age 27) Belgrade, Serbia, FR Yugoslavia
- Height: 1.89 m (6 ft 2 in)
- Weight: 67 kg (148 lb)

Achievements and titles
- Personal best: High jump: 2.20 m
Medal record
Men's athletics
Representing Serbia

Jasmin Halili (Serbian Cyrillic: Јасмин Халили; born 1 March 1999) is a Serbian high jumper.

His personal best is 2.20 m (Gävle 2019). He won the high jump at 2019 European Team Championships in Skopje.
