= Qatar at the 2023 World Athletics Championships =

- Flag of Qatar
- WA code: QAT

in Budapest, Hungary 19 August 2023 – 27 August 2023
- Competitors: 3 (3 men and 0 women)
- Medals: Gold 0 Silver 0 Bronze 1 Total 1

World Athletics Championships appearances
- 1983; 1987; 1991; 1993; 1995; 1997; 1999; 2001; 2003; 2005; 2007; 2009; 2011; 2013; 2015; 2017; 2019; 2022; 2023

Qatar competed at the 2023 World Athletics Championships in Budapest, Hungary, from 19 to 27 August 2023.

== Medalists ==
Medal	Athlete	Event	Date
Bronze	Mutaz Essa Barshim	Men's high jump	August 22

== Results ==
Qatar entered 3 athletes.

Key

- Q = Qualified for the next round
- q = Qualified for the next round as a fastest loser or, in field events, by position without achieving the qualifying target
- NR = National record
- PB = Personal best
- SB = Season best
- N/A = Round not applicable for the event

=== Men ===
Track and road events

Athlete	Event	Heat		Semifinal		Final	
Athlete	Event	Result	Rank	Result	Rank	Result	Rank
Bassem Hemeida	400 metres hurdles	49.50	3 Q	49.50	7	Did not advance	

Field events

Athlete	Event	Qualification		Final	
Athlete	Event	Distance	Position	Distance	Position
Mutaz Essa Barshim	High jump	2.28	1 q	2.33	3rd place, bronze medalist(s)
Moaaz Mohamed Ibrahim	Discus throw	60.40	31	Did not advance	
