= Qatar at the 2011 World Championships in Athletics =

- WA code: QAT
- National federation: Qatar Association of Athletics Federation
- Website: www.qatarathletics.com/en/

in Daegu
- Competitors: 4
- Medals: Gold 0 Silver 0 Bronze 0 Total 0

World Championships in Athletics appearances
- 1983; 1987; 1991; 1993; 1995; 1997; 1999; 2001; 2003; 2005; 2007; 2009; 2011; 2013; 2015; 2017; 2019; 2022; 2023

Qatar competed at the 2011 World Championships in Athletics from August 27 to September 4 in Daegu, South Korea. A team of 4 athletes was announced to represent the country in the event.

== Results ==
=== Men ===
Athlete	Event	Preliminaries		Heats		Semifinals		Final	
Athlete	Event	Time Width Height	Rank	Time Width Height	Rank	Time Width Height	Rank	Time Width Height	Rank
Femi Seun Ogunode	200 metres			20.54	8	20.58	9	Did not advance	
Femi Seun Ogunode	400 metres			45.42 SB	15	45.51 SB	7	45.55	8
Hamza Driouch	1500 metres			3:42.09	27	Did not advance			
Abubaker Ali Kamal	3000 metres steeplechase			8:30.37	20			Did not advance	
Mutaz Essa Barshim	High jump	2.31	2					2.32	7
