= Adrijus Glebauskas =

Lithuanian high jumper (born 1994)

Personal information
- Born: November 20, 1994 (age 31) Kėdainiai, Lithuania
- Height: 1.90 m (6 ft 3 in)
- Weight: 80 kg (176 lb)

Sport
- Country: Lithuania
- Sport: Athletics
- Event: High jump

Achievements and titles
- Personal best: 2.28 m
Medal record
European Championships
- Updated on 15 August 2019

Adrijus Glebauskas (born 20 November 1994) is a Lithuanian high jumper.

He finished fifth at the 2017 Summer Universiade, and won the bronze medal at the 2019 Summer Universiade. He also competed at the 2015 European U23 Championships, the 2018 European Championships and the 2019 European Indoor Championships without reaching the final.

His personal best jump is 2.27 metres, achieved in June 2019 in Utena. He improved it with 2.28 m in Palanga, achieved in July 2019.
