= Ryo Sato (high jumper) =

Japanese high jumper

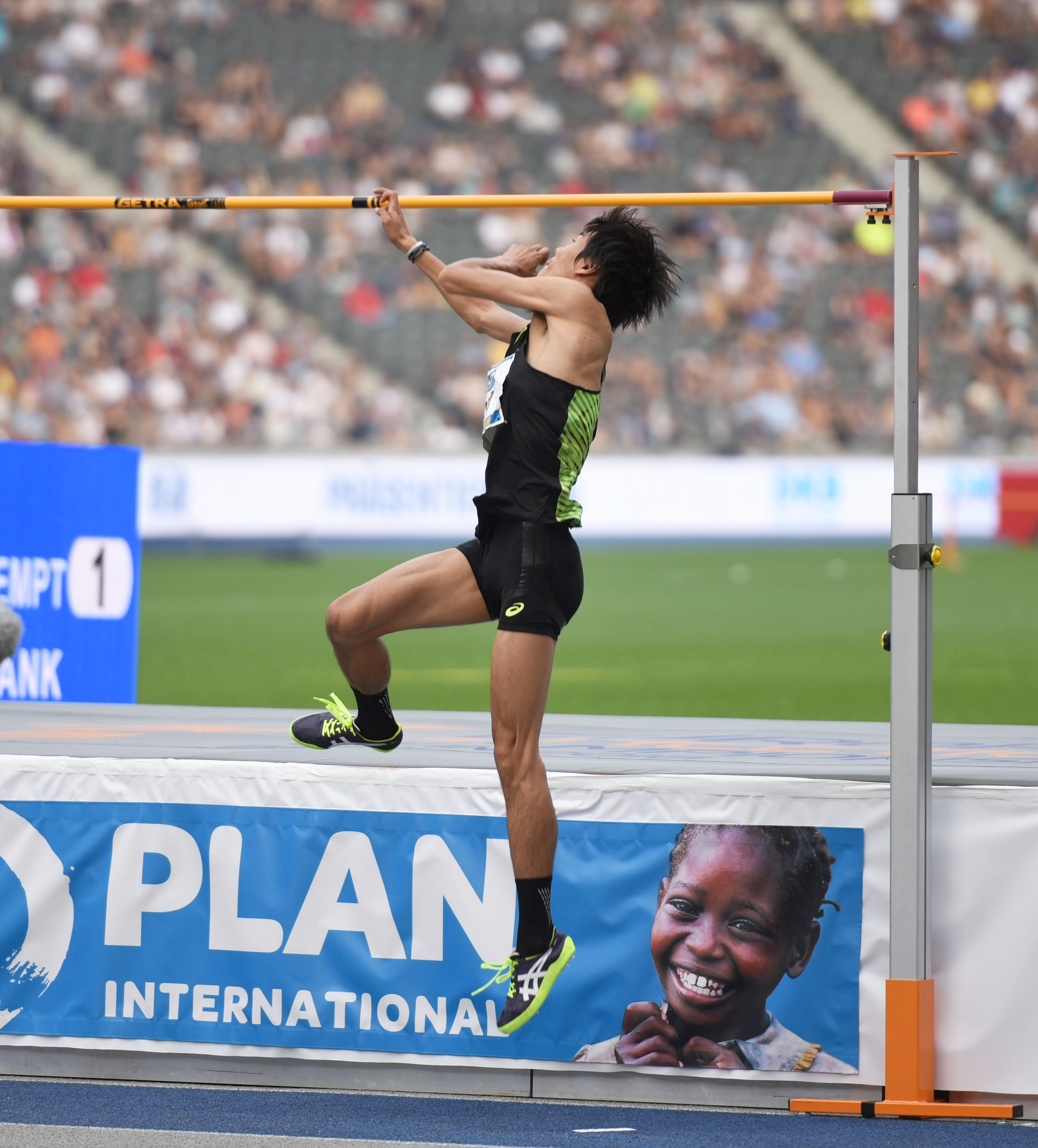

Personal information
- Born: 21 July 1994 (age 31)

Sport
- Country: Japan
- Sport: Track and field
- Event: High jump

Ryo Sato (佐藤 凌, Satō Ryō; born 21 July 1994) is a Japanese athletics competitor competing in the high jump. In 2019, he competed in the men's high jump at the 2019 World Athletics Championships held in Doha, Qatar. He did not qualify to compete in the final.
