= Qatar at the 2009 World Championships in Athletics =

- WA code: QAT

in Berlin
- Competitors: 9
- Medals: Gold 0 Silver 0 Bronze 1 Total 1

World Championships in Athletics appearances
- 1983; 1987; 1991; 1993; 1995; 1997; 1999; 2001; 2003; 2005; 2007; 2009; 2011; 2013; 2015; 2017; 2019; 2022; 2023

Qatar competed at the 2009 World Championships in Athletics from 15–23 August. A team of 9 athletes was announced in preparation for the competition. Selected athletes had achieved one of the competition's qualifying standards.

== Team selection ==
Track and road events

| Event | Athletes | |
| Event | Men | Women |
|---|---|---|
| 100 metres | Samuel Francis | |
| 1500 metres | Mohamad Al-Garni | |
| 5000 metres | James Kwalia C'Kurui; Saif Saaeed Shaheen | |
| 10,000 metres | Ahmad Hassan Abdullah; Nicholas Kemboi | |
| Marathon | Mubarak Hassan Shami | |
| 3000 m steeplechase | Abubaker Ali Kamal | |

Field and combined events

| Event | Athletes | |
| Event | Men | Women |
|---|---|---|
| Discus throw | Ahmed Mohamed Dheeb | |
