= Eugenio Meloni =

Italian high jumper

Personal information
- Born: 28 August 1994 (age 31) Cagliari, Sardinia, Italy

Sport
- Country: Italy
- Sport: Athletics
- Event: High jump

Achievements and titles
- Personal best: 2.21 m (2015, 2017)
Medal record
Europea U23 Championships
Bronze medal – third place	2015 Tallinn	High jump

Eugenio Meloni (born 28 August 1994 in Cagliari) is an Italian athlete, a high jump specialist.

== Biography ==
In his career, he won a bronze medal at the European Athletics U23 Championships in Tallinn in 2015. He also has won one time individual national championship.

== Achievements ==
Year	Competition	Venue	Position	Event	Measure	Notes
2015	European U23 Championships	(Estonia) Tallinn	3rd	High jump	2.21 m	PB
2016	Mediterranean U23 Championships	(Tunisia) Tunis	1st	High jump	2.18 m	

== National titles ==
- Italian Athletics Championships
  - High jump: 2017
