= Fabian Delryd =

Swedish high jumper (born 1996)

Febian Delryd
Personal information
- Nationality: Sweden
- Born: 15 October 1996 (age 29)
- Home town: Sätra, Stockholm, Sweden

Sport
- Sport: Athletics
- Event: High jump
- College team: Wake Forest Demon Deacons
- Club: Täby IS

Achievements and titles
- Personal bests: HJ: 2.33 m (2018); HJ (indoor): 2.26 m (2018)

Fabian Delryd (born 15 October 1996) is a Swedish high jumper. He is the 2021 outdoor Swedish Athletics Championships winner and a two time Swedish Indoor Athletics Championships for Täby IS. In 2018, his jump of 2.33 metres placed him 8th in the world that year.

== Biography ==
Delryd was raised in Sätra, a suburb of Stockholm, Sweden. He had his breakout in the 2018 indoor athletics season, where he jumped 2.26 metres at the Täby Vinterspel meeting. He followed that up with a 2.33 metre jump outdoors, at the time the number 2 performance of the year to date.

Delryd's 2018 season best was higher than all of the 2018 European Athletics Championships finalists' bests at the time of competition, but he could not attend the meet due to injury. Starting in late 2018, Delryd was plagued with multiple issues—first with a tendon injury and hamstring inflammation, and then with a malfunctioning jumping foot.

In 2021, Delryd won his first outdoor national title at the 2021 Swedish Athletics Championships with a mark of 2.20 metres.

== Personal bests ==
Event	Mark	Competition	Venue	Date
High jump	2.33 m	Täby Open	Täby, Sweden	19 May 2018
High jump (indoor)	2.26 m	Täby Vinterspel	Sätra, Sweden	21 January 2018
