= Rory Dwyer =

Irish footballer (1932–2022)

Personal information
- Date of birth: 1932
- Place of birth: Dublin, Ireland
- Date of death: 19 November 2022 (aged 89)
- Place of death: Dublin, Ireland
- Position: Centre forward

Senior career*
Years	Team	Apps	(Gls)
1951–1957	Shelbourne		

International career
- League of Ireland XI
- * Club domestic league appearances and goals

Rory Dwyer (1932 – 19 November 2022) was an Irish football player who played for Shelbourne in the League of Ireland.

== Career ==
Brought up in Inchicore, Dublin, Dwyer played his schoolboy football with St. Finbarrs in Drimnagh, under Gerry Doyle. He won a schoolboy cap against England. Dwyer signed for Shelbourne in 1951 for a fee of £3 a week and a £1 win bonus. His debut season saw him score a club record of 40 goals across all competitions. Dwyer was part of Shelbourne's League of Ireland-winning team in 1953. He also earned a call-up to the League of Ireland XI for an international against Scotland, however, a miscommunication resulted in him missing the match. A recurring cartilage issue resulted in Dwyer's career coming to an end in 1957.

== Personal life and death ==
Dwyer's day job was as a refrigerator mechanic. After his forced retirement from playing, he concentrated on pitch and putt, playing in Erin's Isle in Finglas.

Dwyer died on 19 November 2022, at the age of 89.
