= Roberto Vílches =

Mexican high jumper

Personal information
- Born: 21 May 1999 (age 27) Mexico City, Mexico

Sport
- Sport: Track and field
- Events: High jump, long jump
Medal record
Representing Mexico
World U20 Championships
Gold medal – first place	2018 Tampere	High jump
Pan American Games
Bronze medal – third place	2019 Lima	High jump

Roberto Vilches Ruisánchez (born 21 May 1999 in Mexico City) is a Mexican high and long jumper.

He won the title at 2018 World U20 Championships in Tampere and the bronze medal at 2019 Pan American Games in Lima.

He won the Southeastern Conference indoor high jump championship in 2022.
