= Malaysia Athletics Federation =

Governing body of athletics in Malaysia

- Kesatuan Olahraga Malaysia
- Sport: Athletics
- Abbreviation: MAF/KOM
- Founded: 1913
- Affiliation: Asian Athletics Association
- Headquarters: Bukit Jalil National Stadium, Kuala Lumpur
- President: Karim Ibrahim
- Sponsor: Milo

Official website
- mafmalaysia.com
- (Malaysia)

The Malaysia Athletics Federation (Malay: Kesatuan Olahraga Malaysia) is the governing body for the sport of athletics in Malaysia, is a member of the World Athletics. Formerly known as Malaysia Amateur Athletic Union (MAAU).

== Championships ==
Malaysia Athletics Federation organises championships every year in each of the sporting disciplines.

Edition	Year	Dates	Venue	Notes	Ref
86	2009	10–11 October	Bukit Jalil, Kuala Lumpur		
87	2010	30–31 October	Bukit Jalil, Kuala Lumpur		
88	2011	23–24 July	Kangar, Perlis		
89	2012	6–7 October	Bukit Jalil, Kuala Lumpur		
90	2013	19–20 October	Bukit Jalil, Kuala Lumpur		
91	2014	25–27 June	Kangar, Perlis		
92	2015	27–29 March	Bukit Jalil, Kuala Lumpur		

== Presidents ==
- Before 2006 : ???
- 2006–2012 : Shahidan Kassim
- 2012–2014 : Zainal Abidin Ahmad
- 2014–2019 : Karim Ibrahim
- 2019–2022 : SM Muthu
- 2022–2025 : Shahidan Kassim
- 2025-present : Karim Ibrahim

== See also ==
- List of Malaysian records in athletics
