= Dzmitry Nabokau =

Belarusian high jumper

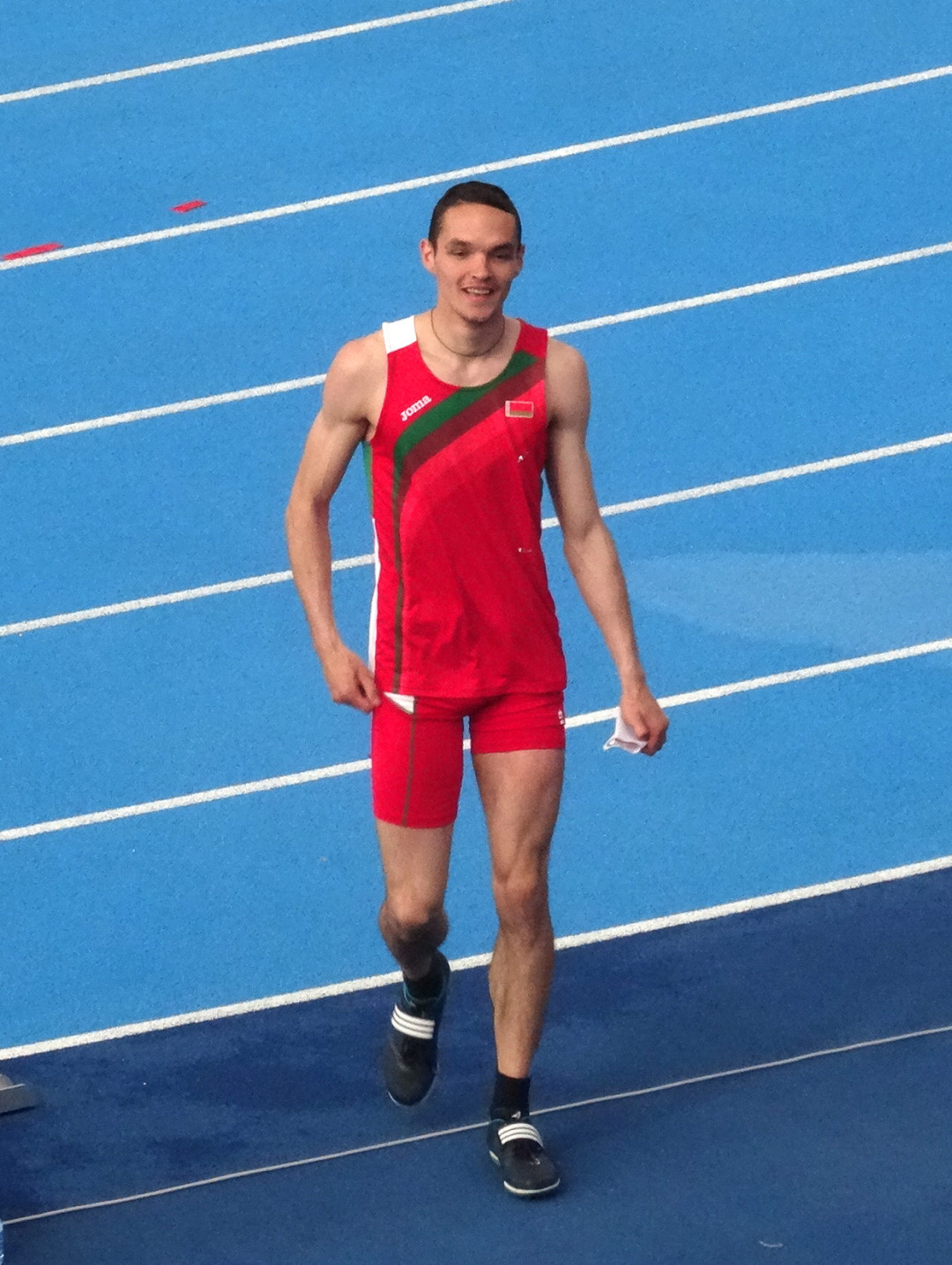
Dzmitry Nabokau in 2017

Dzmitry Syarheyevich Nabokau (Belarusian: Дзмітрый Сяргеевіч Набокаў; born January 20, 1996, in Byalynichy) is a Belarusian high jumper. He competed at the 2016 Summer Olympics in the men's high jump event; his result of 2.17 meters in the qualifying round did not qualify him for the final. 2014 world junior silver medalist. 2017 European u23 champion. Personal Best indoor 2.32 m, outdoor 2.36 m. He established the then national record with 2.36 m (2018 Brest).

In November 2019, Nabokau was provisionally suspended after testing positive for the banned substance Furosemide.
