= Mikhail Akimenko =

Russian high jumper (born 1995)

Personal information
- Full name: Mikhail Sergeyevich Akimenko
- National team: Russia
- Born: 6 December 1995 (age 30) Prokhladny, Kabardino-Balkarian Republic, Russia
- Height: 2 m (6 ft 7 in)

Sport
- Country: Russia; ANA (2019, then 2021); ROC (2021)
- Sport: Athletics
- Event: High jump
Medal record
World Championships
Silver medal – second place	2019 Doha	High jump
World Junior Championships
Gold medal – first place	2014 Eugene	High jump

Mikhail Sergeyevich Akimenko (Russian: Михаи́л Сергее́вич Акиме́нко; born 6 December 1995) is a Russian high jumper.

He won the title, with a personal best of 2.24 m, at the 2014 World Junior Championships. He jumped 2.33 m in Cheboksary in July 2019. On 10 September 2019 he was registered to compete as part of the Authorised Neutral Athletes team at the 2019 World Championships in Doha where he would win the silver medal, with a jump of 2.35 m.
