= List of athletes awarded Stora grabbars och tjejers märke =

Stora grabbars och tjejers märke (lit. 'Big Boys' and Girls' Badge') or SFIF:s hederstecken (lit. 'Swedish Athletics Association decoration') is an honorary award in Swedish athletics, awarded by the Swedish Athletics Association. Stora grabbars och tjejers märke are honorary awards within several Swedish sports, first named in 1928 by Bo Ekelund. To be awarded, a sportsperson has to gather a certain number of points in international (and sometimes national events) according to different rules depending on the sport in question. The recipients are called a 'Stor grabb' (lit. 'Big Boy'). When women gain the title, the recipient is called a 'Stor tjej' (lit. 'Big Girl').

In athletics, six points from a point table were needed to obtain the badge were needed to obtain the badge in the 1930s, where six points were awarded for an Olympic gold medal. In 1941, the level was increased to ten points, which also was the new number for an Olympic gold medal.

Since 1981, 25 points are needed to obtain the badge in athletics. Each different event and result gives different numbers of points, e.g. 25 points for an individual Olympic or World Athletics Championships gold medal, 20 points for a silver medal in said events, three points for an individual Swedish Athletics Championships title, one point for an individual international championship appearance, and half a point for a relay international appearance.

Awarding of the recipients takes place at the following Swedish Athletics Championships. A recipient is granted free entrance to all athletic competitions in Sweden. Athletics recipients may enter the association Friidrottens stora (lit. 'The Bigs of Athletics') that organises events for recipients and awards stipends to young athletes.

63 athletes were awarded in the first year, 1928, with Carl E. Helgesson having badge number 1 reaching the points needed first. As of 2025, 594 athletes have been awarded.

== Recipients ==
As of 16 January 2025:

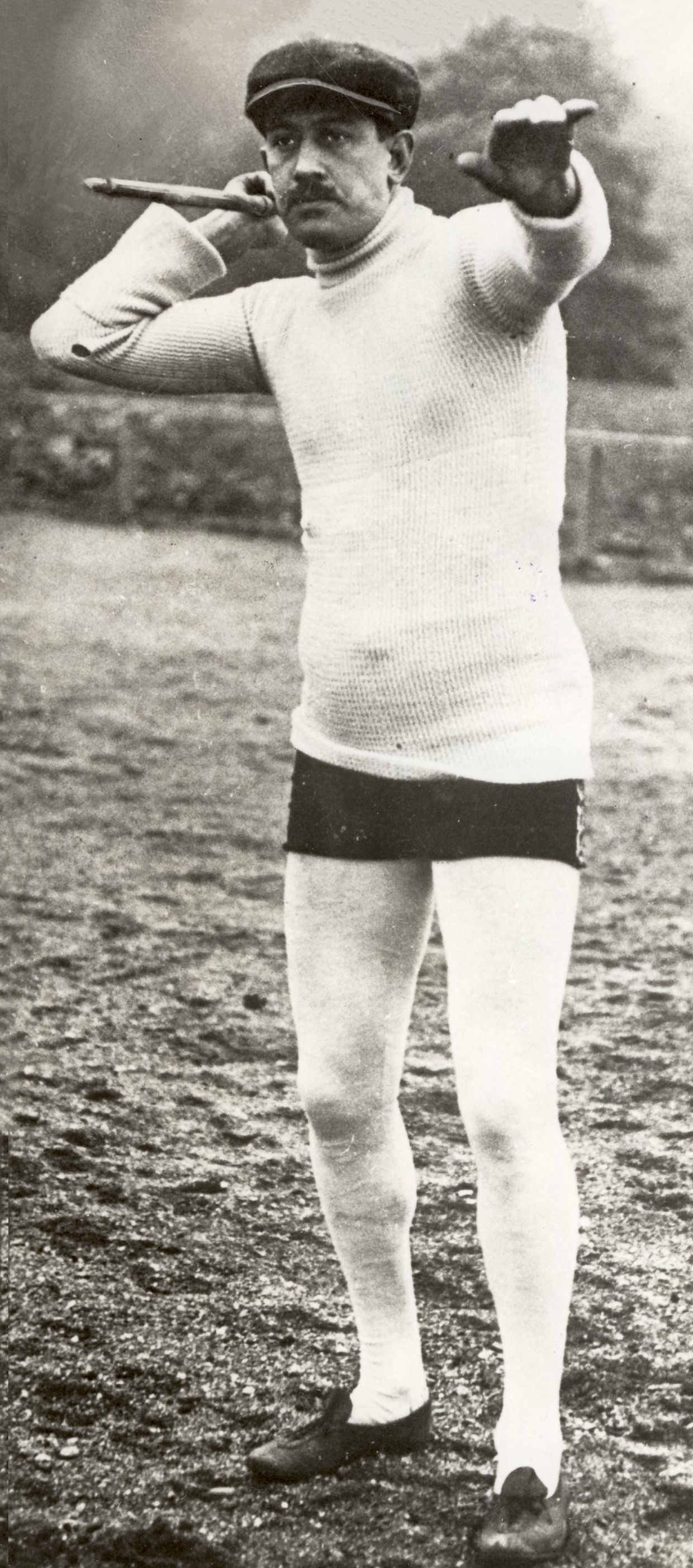
Eric Lemming was awarded Stor grabb number 4.

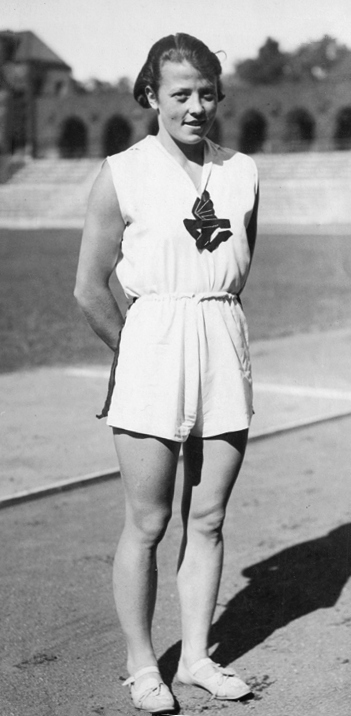
Maj Jacobsson was awarded Stor tjej number 130.

| No | Athlete | Year | Club | Event(s) |
|---|---|---|---|---|
| 1 | Carl E. Helgesson | 1928 | Örgryte IS | shot put, discus |
| 2 | Otto Nilsson | 1928 | Örgryte IS | javelin, discus |
| 3 | Frans Frise | 1928 | Örgryte IS | high jump, long jump |
| 4 | Eric Lemming | 1928 | IS Lyckans Soldater | javelin et cetera |
| 5 | Hjalmar Mellander | 1928 | IFK Halmstad | long jump, javelin |
| 6 | Kristian Hellström | 1928 | IF Sleipner | middle-distance |
| 7 | John Svanberg | 1928 | Fredrikshofs IF | long-distance |
| 8 | Edward Dahl | 1928 | Sundbybergs IK | middle-distance, long-distance |
| 9 | Knut Lindberg | 1928 | Örgryte IS | sprints, javelin |
| 10 | Bruno Söderström | 1928 | IFK Stockholm | pole vault |
| 11 | Gustaf Törnros | 1928 | Fredrikshofs IF | marathon |
| 12 | Ernst Wide | 1928 | IK Göta | middle-distance, long-distance |
| 13 | Gustaf Lindblom | 1928 | IFK Norrköping | triple jump |
| 14 | Hugo Wieslander | 1928 | IFK Stockholm | decathlon |
| 15 | Georg Åberg | 1928 | IFK Norrköping | triple jump |
| 16 | Bertil Uggla | 1928 | IFK Stockholm | pole vault |
| 17 | Ivan Möller | 1928 | Örgryte IS | sprints |
| 18 | Bror Fock | 1928 | Vänersborgs IF | long-distance |
| 19 | Gustaf Holmér | 1928 | Upsala Studenters IF | decathlon |
| 20 | Clas Gille | 1928 | Gefle IF | pole vault |
| 21 | Einar Nilsson | 1928 | Djurgårdens IF | shot put, discus |
| 22 | Leif Sörvik | 1928 | Örgryte IS | javelin |
| 23 | Yngve Häckner | 1928 | IFK Linköping | javelin |
| 24 | John Zander | 1928 | Mariebergs IK | middle-distance, long-distance |
| 25 | Runar Öhman | 1928 | IK Göta | middle-distance, long-distance |
| 26 | Robert Olsson | 1928 | Örgryte IS | hammer |
| 27 | Oscar Zallhagen | 1928 | Westermalms IF | discus |
| 28 | Agne Holmström | 1928 | Fredrikshofs IF | sprints |
| 29 | Ephraim Levin | 1928 | Mariebergs IK | hurdles, triple jump |
| 30 | Nils Engdahl | 1928 | Järva IS | sprints |
| 31 | Bertil Jansson | 1928 | Örebro SK | shot put |
| 32 | Hans Jagenburg | 1928 | Örgryte IS | high jump |
| 33 | Georg Högström | 1928 | IF Göta | pole vault |
| 34 | Anatole Bolin | 1928 | IFK Stockholm | middle-distance |
| 35 | Hjalmar Andersson | 1928 | Insjöns IF | middle-distance, long-distance |
| 36 | Erik Almlöf | 1928 | Djurgårdens IF | triple jump |
| 37 | William Petersson | 1928 | Kalmar IS | long jump |
| 38 | Eric Backman | 1928 | IFK Tidaholm | long-distance |
| 39 | Bo Ekelund | 1928 | Stockholms Studenters IF | high jump |
| 40 | Folke Jansson | 1928 | Örgryte IS | triple jump |
| 41 | Carl Johan Lind | 1928 | IF Göta | hammer |
| 42 | Sven Lundgren | 1928 | IK Göta | middle-distance, long-distance |
| 43 | Gunnar Lindström | 1928 | Eksjö GIK | javelin |
| 44 | Carl-Axel Christiernsson | 1928 | Kronobergs IK | hurdles |
| 45 | John Lilja | 1928 | Mariebergs IK | sprints |
| 46 | Erik Abrahamsson | 1928 | Södertälje SK | long jump |
| 47 | Ernfrid Rydberg | 1928 | Gefle IF | pole vault |
| 48 | Edvin Wide | 1928 | IF Linnéa | middle-distance, long-distance |
| 49 | Hugo Lilliér | 1928 | Mariebergs IK | javelin |
| 50 | Sten Pettersson | 1928 | IK Göta | hurdles |
| 51 | Gustav Kinn | 1928 | IF Thor | marathon |
| 52 | Allan Eriksson | 1928 | IF Elfsborg | discus |
| 53 | Gustaf Mattsson | 1928 | Fredrikshofs IF | middle-distance, long-distance |
| 54 | Erik Blomqvist | 1928 | Kronobergs IK | javelin |
| 55 | Erik Byléhn | 1928 | SoIK Hellas | middle-distance |
| 56 | Evert Nilsson | 1928 | IFK Halmstad | decathlon |
| 57 | Ossian Skiöld | 1928 | IFK Eskilstuna | hammer |
| 58 | Nils Eklöf | 1928 | Fredrikshofs IF | middle-distance, long-distance |
| 59 | Olof Hallberg | 1928 | IF Castor | long jump |
| 60 | Eric Stenfeldt | 1928 | Västerviks IF | long-distance |
| 61 | Henry Lindblad | 1928 | Kronobergs IK | pole vault, decathlon |
| 62 | Erik Lundqvist | 1928 | IFK Grängesberg | javelin |
| 63 | Bror Öhrn | 1928 | IFK Borås | middle-distance, long-distance |
| 64 | Konrad Granström | 1928 | Fredrikshofs IF | mellanhopp |
| 65 | Harald Arbin | 1929 | IS Lyckans Soldater | sprints, javelin |
| 66 | Ivan Nilsson | 1929 | Landala IF | high jump |
| 67 | Gunnar Sköld | 1929 | IFK Enskede | sprints |
| 68 | Eric Wennström | 1929 | Westermalms IF | hurdles |
| 69 | Sten Hammargren | 1930 | IK Göta | sprints |
| 70 | Jean-Gunnar Lindgren | 1930 | IFK Falun | long-distance |
| 71 | Eric Svensson | 1932 | Falkenbergs IK | long jump, triple jump |
| 72 | Leif Dahlgren | 1932 | IFK Malmö | decathlon |
| 73 | Ragnar Magnusson | 1933 | Fredrikshofs IF | long-distance |
| 74 | Samuel Norrby | 1933 | SoIK Hellas | shot put |
| 75 | Gunnar Jansson | 1933 | IFK Eskilstuna | hammer |
| 76 | Kell Areskoug | 1933 | Örgryte IS | hurdles |
| 77 | Roland Mentzer | 1933 | Örgryte IS | sprints |
| 78 | Eric Ny | 1933 | IK Mode | middle-distance |
| 79 | Harald Andersson | 1934 | IK Heros | discus |
| 80 | Bo Ljungberg | 1934 | Malmö AI | pole vault |
| 81 | Lennart Atterwall | 1935 | IFK Knislinge | javelin |
| 82 | Håkan Lidman | 1935 | Örgryte IS | hurdles |
| 83 | Lennart Strandberg | 1935 | Malmö AI | sprints |
| 84 | Bertil von Wachenfeldt | 1935 | IK Göta | sprints |
| 85 | Gunnar Bergh | 1936 | Göteborgs Polismäns IF | discus, shot put |
| 86 | Henry Jonsson | 1936 | Kälarnes IK | middle-distance, long-distance |
| 87 | Kurt Lundqvist | 1936 | Redbergslids IK | high jump |
| 88 | Fred Warngård | 1936 | Malmö AI | hammer |
| 89 | Åke Jansson | 1937 | Spånga IS | middle-distance, long-distance |
| 90 | Lennart Andersson | 1938 | IFK Hälsingborg | triple jump |
| 91 | Olof Bexell | 1938 | IFK Luleå | decathlon |
| 92 | Lars Larsson | 1938 | IFK Lidingö | steeplechase |
| 93 | Henry Palmé | 1938 | Fredrikshofs IF | marathon |
| 94 | Åke Stenqvist | 1938 | IK Mode | long jump |
| 95 | Bertil Andersson | 1939 | IFK Ronneby | middle-distance |
| 96 | Bror Hellström | 1940 | Brandkårens IK | middle-distance, long-distance |
| 97 | Lennart Nilsson | 1940 | Örgryte IS | middle-distance |
| 98 | Åke Ödmark | 1940 | IFK Strömsund | high jump |
| 99 | Bertil Gustafsson | 1941 | Gammalstorps IF | pole vault |
| 100 | Sixten Larsson | 1941 | IFK Borås | hurdles |
| 101 | Arne Andersson | 1942 | SoIK Hellas | middle-distance, long-distance |
| 102 | Gunder Hägg | 1942 | Gefle IF | middle-distance, long-distance |
| 103 | Bo Ericsson | 1943 | IFK Göteborg | hammer |
| 104 | Sven Ljunggren | 1943 | IFK Linköping | middle-distance |
| 105 | Sven Daleflod | 1944 | Dala-Floda IF | javelin |
| 106 | Assar Duregård | 1946 | Skara IF | high jump |
| 107 | Stig Håkansson | 1946 | IF Göta | sprints, long jump |
| 108 | Bertil Johnsson | 1946 | IK Vikingen | triple jump, long jump |
| 109 | Herman Kristoffersson | 1946 | Kronobergs IK | hurdles, high jump |
| 110 | Herbert Willny | 1946 | SoIK Hellas | shot put |
| 111 | Hans Liljekvist | 1946 | IS Göta | middle-distance |
| 112 | Åke Hallgren | 1946 | IF Sleipner | triple jump |
| 113 | Thore Tillman | 1946 | IF Thor | long-distance |
| 114 | Robert Tegstedt | 1946 | IFK Borås | javelin |
| 115 | Erik Wennberg | 1946 | Malmö AI | middle-distance |
| 116 | Olle Laessker | 1946 | Gävle SoGF | long jump, sprints |
| 117 | Göran Waxberg | 1946 | Stockholms Studenters IF | decathlon |
| 118 | Åke Durkfeldt | 1947 | Wedevågs IF | long-distance |
| 119 | Allan Gustafsson | 1947 | Örgryte IS | triple jump, standing jumps |
| 120 | Hugo Göllors | 1947 | Malungs IF | pole vault |
| 121 | Allan Lindberg | 1947 | Fagersta AIK | pole vault |
| 122 | Lennart Strand | 1947 | Malmö AI | middle-distance |
| 123 | Bertil Albertsson | 1948 | Upsala IF | long-distance |
| 124 | Erik Elmsäter | 1948 | I 13 IF | steeplechase |
| 125 | Henry Eriksson | 1948 | Gefle IF | middle-distance |
| 126 | Gösta Jacobsson | 1948 | IK Ymer | long-distance |
| 127 | Rune Larsson | 1948 | UoIF Matteuspojkarna | hurdles, sprints |
| 128 | Tore Sjöstrand | 1948 | Bellevue IK | steeplechase |
| 129 | Arne Åhman | 1948 | Nordingrå SK | triple jump, high jump |
| 130 | Maj Jacobsson | 1948 | IK Göta | hurdles, long jump |
| 131 | Ann-Britt Leyman | 1948 | Kvinnliga IK Sport | long jump, sprints |
| 132 | Birgit Lundström | 1948 | Malmö AI | discus, shot put et cetera |
| 133 | Eivor Olson | 1948 | Redbergslids IK | shot put, discus, javelin |
| 134 | Maud Sundberg | 1948 | IK Göta | hurdles, sprints |
| 135 | Ruth Svedberg | 1948 | Kvinnliga IK Sport | discus, shot put et cetera |
| 136 | Elsa Svensson | 1948 | Lidköpings IS | shot put, discus |
| 137 | Märta Wretman | 1948 | IK Göta | sprints, long jump et cetera |
| 138 | Majken Åberg | 1948 | IFK Norrköping | discus, slingball throw |
| 139 | Ingvar Bengtsson | 1949 | Gefle IF | middle-distance |
| 140 | Gösta Leandersson | 1949 | IFK Östersund | marathon |
| 141 | Ragnar Lundberg | 1949 | IFK Södertälje | pole vault, hurdles |
| 142 | Lennart Moberg | 1949 | SoIK Hellas | triple jump |
| 143 | Roland Nilsson | 1949 | Westermalms IF | shot put, discus |
| 144 | Gustaf Strand | 1949 | IFK Växjö | long jump |
| 145 | Lars-Erik Wolfbrandt | 1949 | Örebro SK | 400 m, 800 m |
| 146 | Curt Söderberg | 1950 | Turebergs IF | steeplechase |
| 147 | Per-Arne Berglund | 1951 | IF Start | javelin |
| 148 | Valter Nyström | 1951 | Sandvikens GK | long-distance |
| 149 | Gunnar Petersson | 1951 | IFK Växjö | javelin |
| 150 | Kjell Tånnander | 1951 | Malmö AI | decathlon |
| 151 | Olle Åberg | 1951 | Gefle IF | middle-distance |
| 152 | Mona-Lisa Englund | 1951 | Kvinnliga IK Sport | pentathlon |
| 153 | Ulla Gadd | 1951 | Göteborgs KIK | long jump |
| 154 | Nell Sjöström | 1951 | Sandvikens GK | sprints |
| 155 | Gösta Brännström | 1952 | Skellefteå AIK | sprints |
| 156 | Tage Ekfeldt | 1952 | Örebro SK | 400 m, 800 m |
| 157 | Per Eriksson | 1952 | Arbrå IK | decathlon |
| 158 | Karl-Erik Israelsson | 1952 | IF Ulvarna | long jump, hurdles |
| 159 | Gustaf Jansson | 1952 | IK Viking | long-distance |
| 160 | Arne Ljungqvist | 1952 | Westermalms IF | high jump |
| 161 | Lars Ylander | 1952 | Turebergs IF | hurdles |
| 162 | Ingrid Almqvist | 1952 | Redbergslids IK | javelin |
| 163 | Anna-Lisa Augustsson | 1952 | IK Göta | sprints |
| 164 | Greta Magnusson | 1952 | Ödskölts IF | long jump, sprints |
| 165 | Ingvar Ericsson | 1953 | Brandkårens IK | middle-distance |
| 166 | Roger Norman | 1953 | Västerås IK | triple jump |
| 167 | Allan Ringström | 1953 | Brännans IF | hammer |
| 168 | Gösta Svensson | 1953 | Svängsta IF | high jump |
| 169 | Thage Pettersson | 1953 | Lidköpings IS | shot put |
| 170 | Jan Carlsson | 1954 | IFK Göteborg | sprints |
| 171 | Sven-Olof Eriksson | 1954 | IK Heros | hurdles |
| 172 | Bengt Nilsson | 1954 | Westermalms IF | high jump |
| 173 | Gunhild Larking | 1954 | Jönköpings AIF | high jump |
| 174 | Britt Mårtensson | 1954 | IFK Kristianstad | sprints |
| 175 | Otto Bengtsson | 1954 | IFK Knislinge | javelin |
| 176 | Sune Karlsson | 1954 | Gefle IF | middle-distance |
| 177 | Inga Gentzel | 1955 | Djurgårdens IF | 800 m, 200 m |
| 178 | Lars Arvidsson | 1955 | Örebro SK | discus |
| 179 | Birger Asplund | 1955 | IF Castor | hammer |
| 180 | Stina Cronholm | 1955 | Malmö AI | hurdles, pentathlon |
| 181 | Kenneth Johansson | 1955 | Sävedalens AIK | hurdles |
| 182 | Evert Nyberg | 1955 | Örgryte IS | long-distance |
| 183 | Ulla-Britt Johansson | 1955 | IFK Munkfors | sprints |
| 184 | Knut Fredriksson | 1956 | IK Favör | javelin |
| 185 | Inga-Britt Lorentzon | 1956 | IFK Västerås | high jump, pentathlon |
| 186 | Jenny Carlsson | 1956 | IK Ymer | 800 m |
| 187 | Lennart Lind | 1956 | Bromma IF | pole vault |
| 188 | Björn Malmroos | 1956 | Malmö AI | sprints |
| 189 | Barbro Schönborg | 1956 | Göteborgs KIK | discus |
| 190 | Gunnar Tjörnebo | 1956 | IFK Hälsingborg | steeplechase |
| 191 | Erik Uddebom | 1956 | Bromma IF | shot put, discus |
| 192 | Dan Waern | 1956 | Örgryte IS | middle-distance |
| 193 | Alf Petersson | 1957 | IFK Hälsingborg | sprints, triple jump |
| 194 | Stig Pettersson | 1957 | Kronobergs IK | high jump |
| 195 | Gullbrand Sjöström | 1957 | Skellefteå AIK | javelin |
| 196 | Per-Owe Trollsås | 1957 | Bromma IF | hurdles, sprints |
| 197 | Sten Erickson | 1958 | IF Elfsborg | triple jump |
| 198 | Torgny Wåhlander | 1958 | Turebergs IF | long jump, triple jump |
| 199 | Gösta Arvidsson | 1959 | Falköpings AIK | shot put |
| 200 | Richard Dahl | 1959 | Södertälje IF | high jump |
| 201 | Lennart Jonsson | 1959 | Bromma IF | sprints |
| 202 | Hans Norberg | 1959 | Sundbybergs IK | steeplechase |
| 203 | Sven-Olof Westlund | 1959 | UoIF Matteuspojkarna | sprints |
| 204 | Maj-Lena Lundström | 1959 | IFK Norrköping | high jump, pentathlon |
| 205 | Ove Andersson | 1960 | Västerås IK | hurdles |
| 206 | Wivianne Bergh | 1960 | Göteborgs KIK | discus |
| 207 | Inga Broberg | 1960 | IK Göta | long jump |
| 208 | Owe Jonsson | 1960 | IFK Växjö | sprints |
| 209 | Boris Jönsson | 1960 | Eksjö GIK | long-distance |
| 210 | Bertil Källevågh | 1960 | Mjölby AI | long-distance |
| 211 | Ulla-Britt Wieslander | 1961 | IK Ymer | sprints |
| 212 | Gunilla Cederström | 1961 | Malmö AI | combined et cetera |
| 213 | Elisabeth Östberg | 1961 | Göteborgs KIK | 400 m, 800 m |
| 214 | Bo Forssander | 1961 | Skackans IF | hurdles, sprints |
| 215 | Solgun Bovall | 1962 | IK Vikingen | sprints |
| 216 | Berit Larsson | 1962 | IFK Norrköping | high jump |
| 217 | Maj-Britt Stolpe | 1962 | IFK Hälsingborg | shot put |
| 218 | Hans-Olof Johansson | 1962 | Nyköpings SK | sprints |
| 219 | Lage Tedenby | 1962 | IF Vingarna | steeplechase |
| 220 | Bengt-Göran Fernström | 1963 | SoIK Hellas | sprints |
| 221 | Lars Haglund | 1963 | Westermalms IF | discus |
| 222 | Ove Karlsson | 1963 | Sundsvalls Friidrott | long-distance |
| 223 | Sven-Olof Larsson | 1963 | Sundsvalls Friidrott | middle-distance, long-distance |
| 224 | Kjell-Åke Nilsson | 1963 | Sörmarks IF | high jump |
| 225 | Gun-Britt Flink | 1964 | Göteborgs KIK | shot put |
| 226 | Gunilla Olausson | 1964 | SK Sifhälla | 400 m, 800 m |
| 227 | Bo Althoff | 1964 | Melleruds IF | sprints |
| 228 | Sven Hörtewall | 1964 | Malmö AI | sprints |
| 229 | Stig Lindbäck | 1964 | Västerås IK | middle-distance |
| 230 | Karl-Uno Olofsson | 1964 | IFK Umeå | middle-distance |
| 231 | Bengt Persson | 1964 | IFK Umeå | middle-distance, long-distance |
| 232 | Lennart Hedmark | 1965 | Skellefteå AIK | decathlon, javelin |
| 233 | Leif Librand | 1965 | IK Vikingen | hurdles |
| 234 | Tapio Mertanen | 1965 | Södertälje IF | pole vault |
| 235 | Karin Lundgren | 1965 | Göteborgs IK | sprints |
| 236 | Bengt Nåjde | 1966 | Mälarhöjdens IK | middle-distance, long-distance |
| 237 | Ulla Ekblom | 1966 | Mariestads AIF | long jump, 400 m |
| 238 | Bengt Bendéus | 1967 | Malmö AI | shot put |
| 239 | Jan Dahlgren | 1967 | Westermalms IF | high jump |
| 240 | Anders Gärderud | 1967 | IFK Lidingö | middle-distance, long-distance |
| 241 | Lars-Olof Höök | 1967 | SoIK Hellas | long jump |
| 242 | Hans Lagerqvist | 1967 | Duvbo IK | pole vault |
| 243 | Margareta Bergqvist | 1968 | SK Sifhälla | high jump |
| 244 | Ingela Ericson | 1968 | Göteborgs KIK | 400 m, 800 m |
| 245 | Gunilla Karlmark | 1968 | Malmö AI | hurdles, long jump |
| 246 | Ove Berg | 1968 | Hofors AIF | middle-distance |
| 247 | Curt Johansson | 1968 | Wärnamo SK | sprints |
| 248 | Kenneth Lundmark | 1968 | Skellefteå AIK | high jump |
| 249 | Åke Nilsson | 1968 | Gefle IF | javelin |
| 250 | Bertil Wistam | 1968 | SoIK Hellas | hurdles |
| 251 | Anne-Marie Nenzell | 1969 | IFK Sundsvall | middle-distance |
| 252 | Bo Blomqvist | 1969 | Duvbo IK | triple jump |
| 253 | John-Erik Blomqvist | 1969 | Malmö AI | pole vault |
| 254 | Ricky Bruch | 1969 | Malmö AI | discus, shot put |
| 255 | Anders Faager | 1969 | Wärnamo SK | sprints |
| 256 | Kjell Isaksson | 1969 | Sundbybergs IK | pole vault |
| 257 | Jan-Erik Karlsson | 1969 | IK Vikingen | steeplechase |
| 258 | Sven-Åke Lövgren | 1969 | Heleneholms IF | sprints |
| 259 | Birger Nyberg | 1969 | Täby IS | triple jump |
| 260 | Jan Smiding | 1969 | Gefle IF | javelin |
| 261 | Lars-Inge Ström | 1969 | Västerås IK | hammer |
| 262 | Erik Östbye | 1969 | Solvikingarna | marathon |
| 263 | Erik Ahldén | 1969 | Bellevue IK | middle-distance, long-distance |
| 264 | Anton Bolinder | 1969 | IFK Östersund | high jump |
| 265 | Karl-Erik Ekman | 1969 | Västerås SK | standing jumps |
| 266 | Lennart Eliasson | 1969 | IK Mode | long jump |
| 267 | Rune Gustafsson | 1969 | Wärnamo SK | middle-distance |
| 268 | Arne Hellberg | 1969 | Solna IF | shot put, discus |
| 269 | Anders Sjögren | 1969 | IK Mode | sprints |
| 270 | Erik Westlin | 1969 | IFK Norrköping | discus |
| 271 | Gösta Östbrink | 1969 | Stockholms Spårvägars GoIF | long-distance |
| 272 | Anna Larsson | 1969 | IFK Nora | 800 m, 200 m |
| 273 | Gudrun Arenander | 1969 | IFK Lidingö | discus |
| 274 | Britt Johansson | 1970 | Glanshammars IF | shot put, pentathlon |
| 275 | Birgitta Larsson | 1970 | Mölndals AIK | long jump, 400 m, pentathlon |
| 276 | Gunhild Olsson | 1970 | IFK Helsingborg | hurdles, sprints |
| 277 | Elisabeth Randerz | 1970 | Malmö AI | sprints |
| 278 | Thord Carlsson | 1970 | IF Linnéa | shot put |
| 279 | Torsten Torstensson | 1970 | KA 2 IF | hurdles |
| 280 | Ulf Högberg | 1971 | IFK Lidingö | middle-distance |
| 281 | Sune Blomqvist | 1972 | Västerås IK | hammer |
| 282 | Gunnar Ekman | 1972 | Mälarhöjdens IK | middle-distance |
| 283 | Michael Fredriksson | 1972 | Örgryte IS | sprints |
| 284 | Inger Knutsson | 1973 | Nynäshamns IF | middle-distance, long-distance |
| 285 | Margaretha Lövgren | 1973 | Heleneholms IF | sprints |
| 286 | Krister Clerselius | 1977 | Malmö AI | hurdles |
| 287 | Christer Garpenborg | 1977 | KA 2 IF | sprints |
| 288 | Linda Haglund | 1977 | Hanvikens SK | sprints |
| 289 | Thorsten Johansson | 1977 | KA 2 IF | sprints |
| 290 | Gunilla Lindh | 1977 | Mölndals AIK | middle-distance |
| 291 | Charlotte Malmström | 1977 | Mölndals AIK | long jump, 400 m, 800 m, 400 m hurdles |
| 292 | Kenth Olsson | 1977 | IFK Helsingborg | hurdles |
| 293 | Ann Larsson | 1977 | Göteborgs KIK | 400 m, 800 m |
| 294 | Rune Almén | 1977 | IF Göta | high jump |
| 295 | Erik Carlgren | 1977 | Västerås IK | sprints |
| 296 | Hans Höglund | 1977 | Mölndals AIK | shot put |
| 297 | Åke Svenson | 1977 | IFK Kristinehamn | middle-distance |
| 298 | Eva Gustafsson | 1978 | Kils AIK | middle-distance, long-distance |
| 299 | Annette Tånnander | 1978 | Malmö AI | high jump, combined |
| 300 | Ingrid Wehmonen | 1978 | Bellevue IK | shot put, discus |
| 301 | Åsa Westman | 1978 | IF Göta | javelin |
| 302 | Dan Glans | 1978 | IFK Helsingborg | middle-distance, long-distance |
| 303 | Ulf Jarfelt | 1978 | IK Vikingen | long jump |
| 304 | Raimo Pihl | 1978 | Stockholms Spårvägars GoIF | decathlon, javelin |
| 305 | Per-Olof Sjöberg | 1978 | Malmö AI | sprints |
| 306 | Gert Möller | 1979 | Malmö AI | 400 m, 800 m, 400 m hurdles |
| 307 | Margareta Carell | 1979 | Mölndals AIK | javelin |
| 308 | Anne Arén | 1980 | IFK Helsingborg | hurdles, sprints |
| 309 | Helena Pihl | 1980 | Stockholms Spårvägars GoIF | hurdles, pentathlon |
| 310 | Christer Gullstrand | 1980 | IFK Helsingborg | hurdles, sprints |
| 311 | Kenneth Åkesson | 1980 | Västerås IK | discus |
| 312 | Gun Mortimer Johansson | 1981 | IFK Halmstad | discus, shot put |
| 313 | Ann-Ewa Karlsson | 1981 | Visby IF Gute | high jump |
| 314 | Lena Möller | 1981 | Malmö AI | sprints |
| 315 | Karoline Nemetz | 1981 | Råby-Rekarne GoIF | middle-distance, long-distance |
| 316 | Ann-Louise Skoglund | 1981 | IF Göta | hurdles, sprints |
| 317 | Kristine Tånnander | 1981 | Malmö AI | heptathlon, high jump |
| 318 | Björn Nilsson | 1981 | Turebergs IF | middle-distance |
| 319 | Anders Arrhenius | 1982 | Stockholms Spårvägars GoIF | shot put |
| 320 | Johan Brink | 1982 | Örgryte IS | triple jump, long jump |
| 321 | Kenth Eldebrink | 1982 | Södertälje IF | javelin |
| 322 | Åke Fransson | 1982 | IK Vikingen | long jump |
| 323 | Kenth Gardenkrans | 1982 | Mölndals AIK | discus, shot put |
| 324 | Jan Hagelbrand | 1982 | Melleruds IF | middle-distance, long-distance |
| 325 | Susanne Lorentzon | 1982 | UF Contact | high jump, heptathlon |
| 326 | Christer Lythell | 1982 | Hässelby SK | decathlon |
| 327 | Anders Mossberg | 1982 | Hässelby SK | triple jump |
| 328 | Elisabet Nagy | 1982 | Alingsås IF | javelin |
| 329 | Katharina Sävestrand-Jönnå | 1982 | Göteborgs KIK | middle-distance, long-distance |
| 330 | Lena Wallin | 1982 | Malmö AI | long jump, sprints |
| 331 | Pär Wallin | 1982 | Stockholms Spårvägars GoIF | middle-distance, long-distance |
| 332 | Miro Zalar | 1982 | KA 2 IF | pole vault |
| 333 | Karin Bergdahl | 1983 | Kalix Friidrott | javelin |
| 334 | Eric Josjö | 1983 | Turebergs IF | sprints |
| 335 | Stefan Nilsson | 1983 | KA 2 IF | sprints |
| 336 | Sven Nylander | 1983 | IF Göta | hurdles, sprints |
| 337 | Tommy Persson | 1983 | Heleneholms IF | long-distance |
| 338 | Kenth Rönn | 1983 | Stockholms Spårvägars GoIF | sprints |
| 339 | Kirsi Ulvinen | 1983 | Göteborgs KIK | hurdles |
| 340 | Kjell Bystedt | 1984 | IK VIK-friidrott | hammer |
| 341 | Eva Ernström | 1984 | Väsby IK | middle-distance, long-distance |
| 342 | Gunnel Hettman | 1984 | Heleneholms IF | discus, shot put |
| 343 | Charlotte Holmström | 1984 | IF Göta | long jump, sprints |
| 344 | Jill McCabe | 1984 | Malmö AI | middle-distance |
| 345 | Per Nilsson | 1984 | Piteå IF | shot put |
| 346 | Per-Ola Olsson | 1984 | IK VIK-friidrott | sprints |
| 347 | Kenneth Riggberger | 1984 | KA 2 IF | decathlon |
| 348 | Patrik Sjöberg | 1984 | Örgryte IS | high jump, long jump |
| 349 | Kjell-Erik Ståhl | 1984 | KA 2 IF | long-distance |
| 350 | Rajne Söderberg | 1984 | SoIK Hellas | hurdles |
| 351 | Birgit Bringslid | 1985 | Skellefteå AIK | middle-distance, long-distance |
| 352 | Midde Hamrin | 1985 | IK Vikingen | long-distance |
| 353 | Lars Ericsson | 1985 | Mälarhöjdens IK | middle-distance, long-distance |
| 354 | Thomas Eriksson | 1985 | Arbrå IK | high jump, triple jump |
| 355 | Mats Erixon | 1985 | Mölndals AIK | middle-distance, long-distance |
| 356 | Anders Hoffström | 1985 | Stockholms Spårvägars GoIF | long jump |
| 357 | Anders Skärvstrand | 1985 | Stockholms Spårvägars GoIF | shot put |
| 358 | Johnny Kroon | 1985 | Heleneholms IF | middle-distance |
| 359 | Ronny Olsson | 1985 | Malmö AI | middle-distance |
| 360 | Conny Persson-Silfver | 1985 | Hässelby SK | decathlon, hurdles |
| 361 | Anne-Marie Tornegård | 1986 | Södertälje IF | shot put |
| 362 | Christina Wennberg | 1986 | IFK Trelleborg | hurdles |
| 363 | Leif Lundmark | 1986 | Skellefteå AIK | javelin |
| 364 | Thomas Nyberg | 1986 | KA 2 IF | hurdles |
| 365 | Tommy Johansson | 1987 | IF Göta | sprints |
| 366 | Tore Gustafsson | 1987 | Mölndals AIK | hammer |
| 367 | Arne Holm | 1987 | Utby IK | triple jump |
| 368 | Claes Rahm | 1987 | Gefle IF | triple jump, long jump |
| 369 | Lars-Erik Nilsson | 1987 | Kils AIK | long-distance |
| 370 | Dag Wennlund | 1987 | Mariestads AIF | javelin |
| 371 | Eva Karblom | 1987 | SoIK Hellas | heptathlon, long jump |
| 372 | Evy Palm | 1987 | Mölndals AIK | long-distance |
| 373 | Göran Högberg | 1988 | Enhörna IF | long-distance |
| 374 | Ulf Johansson-Söderman | 1988 | IK Hakarpspojkarna | hurdles |
| 375 | Susanna Bergman | 1988 | Göteborgs KIK | sprints |
| 376 | Pia Engström | 1988 | Stockholms Spårvägars GoIF | sprints |
| 377 | Annika Ericson | 1988 | IFK Lidingö | middle-distance, long-distance |
| 378 | Maria Fernström | 1988 | SoIK Hellas | sprints |
| 379 | Caroline Isgren | 1988 | Heleneholms IF | shot put |
| 380 | Christina Sundberg | 1988 | IK Orient | long jump |
| 381 | Martin Enholm | 1989 | IFK Lidingö | middle-distance |
| 382 | Ulf Sedlacek | 1989 | Umedalens IF | hurdles, sprints |
| 383 | Monica Strand | 1989 | Kalix Friidrott | sprints |
| 384 | Monica Westén-Rydén | 1989 | Huddinge AIS | heptathlon, hurdles, high jump |
| 385 | Anette Westerberg | 1989 | Stockholms Spårvägars GoIF | middle-distance, long-distance |
| 386 | Peter Borglund | 1990 | Gefle IF | javelin |
| 387 | Jonny Danielson | 1990 | Kvarnsvedens GoIF | middle-distance, long-distance |
| 388 | Peter Eriksson | 1990 | IFK Helsingborg | hurdles, sprints |
| 389 | Sören Tallhem | 1990 | Södertörns FF | shot put |
| 390 | Christina Nordström | 1990 | Jönköpings AIF | high jump |
| 391 | Stefan Fernholm | 1991 | Bellevue IK | discus, shot put |
| 392 | Maria Akraka | 1991 | Rånäs 4H | middle-distance, long-distance |
| 393 | Patrik Bodén | 1991 | IF Göta | javelin |
| 394 | Helena Fernström | 1991 | SoIK Hellas | hurdles, sprints |
| 395 | Tord Henriksson | 1991 | IF Göta | triple jump |
| 396 | Annika Lorentzon | 1991 | UF Contact | hurdles |
| 397 | Lars Sundin | 1991 | IFK Mora | discus, shot put |
| 398 | Niklas Wallenlind | 1991 | Mölndals AIK | hurdles, sprints |
| 399 | Peter Widén | 1991 | IFK Växjö | pole vault, long jump |
| 400 | Henrik Dagård | 1992 | Hässelby SK | decathlon, sprints |
| 401 | Stefan Karlsson | 1992 | IK Sisu | high jump |
| 402 | Karin Colberg | 1992 | Västerås FK | discus, javelin |
| 403 | Malin Ewerlöf | 1992 | Södertälje IF | middle-distance, long-distance |
| 404 | Monika Klebe | 1992 | IF Göta | hurdles, sprints |
| 405 | Gunilla Ascard | 1993 | Malmö AI | sprints |
| 406 | Sten Ekberg | 1993 | Nyköpings BIS | decathlon |
| 407 | Lars Hedner | 1993 | Malmö AI | sprints |
| 408 | Liz Hjalmarsson | 1993 | IF Göta | middle-distance, long-distance |
| 409 | Erica Johansson | 1993 | Mölndals AIK | long jump, hurdles |
| 410 | Ewa Johansson | 1993 | Gefle IF | sprints, hurdles |
| 411 | Kent Larsson | 1993 | IF Castor | shot put |
| 412 | Thomas Leandersson | 1993 | Malmö AI | sprints |
| 413 | Niklas Eriksson | 1994 | Malmö AI | hurdles, sprints |
| 414 | Torbjörn Eriksson | 1994 | Falu IK | sprints |
| 415 | Marko Granat | 1994 | IFK Helsingborg | sprints, hurdles |
| 416 | Frida Svensson | 1994 | Västhälsinge Friidrott | hurdles, 400 m |
| 417 | Linda-Marie Mårtensson | 1994 | Falu IK | shot put |
| 418 | Mattias Sunneborn | 1994 | Malmö AI | long jump, sprints |
| 419 | Claes Albihn | 1995 | Spårvägens FK | hurdles |
| 420 | Maria Staafgård | 1995 | Malmö AI | sprints |
| 421 | Patrik Stenlund | 1995 | IK VIK-friidrott | pole vault |
| 422 | Patrick Thavelin | 1995 | Umedalens IF | high jump |
| 423 | Marika Johansson | 1996 | IF Göta | sprints |
| 424 | Torbjörn Johansson | 1996 | Malmö AI | middle-distance |
| 425 | Claes Nyberg | 1996 | Mölndals AIK | middle-distance, long-distance |
| 426 | Dag Solhaug | 1996 | IF Göta | discus |
| 427 | Ludmila Engquist | 1997 | IFK Lidingö | hurdles |
| 428 | Lars Hedman | 1997 | Ullevi FK | triple jump |
| 429 | Patrik Johansson | 1997 | Spårvägens FK | middle-distance |
| 430 | Per Karlsson | 1997 | IFK Växjö | hammer |
| 431 | Peter Karlsson | 1997 | Alingsås IF | sprints |
| 432 | Peter Koskenkorva | 1997 | IF Göta | middle-distance, long-distance |
| 433 | Rikard Rasmusson | 1997 | Heleneholms IF | sprints |
| 434 | Anna Söderberg | 1997 | Ullevi FK | discus, hammer |
| 435 | Sara Wedlund | 1997 | Hässelby SK | middle-distance, long-distance |
| 436 | Kajsa Bergqvist | 1998 | Turebergs FK | high jump |
| 437 | Kent Claesson | 1998 | Skillingaryds FK | middle-distance, long-distance |
| 438 | Annika Larsson | 1998 | Gefle IF | discus |
| 439 | Monica Lundgren | 1998 | Täby IS | 400 m, 800 m |
| 440 | Lena Åström | 1998 | KFUM Örebro | javelin |
| 441 | Stefan Holm | 1999 | Kils AIK | high jump |
| 442 | Therese Olofsson | 1999 | Hälle IF | sprints |
| 443 | Kristian Pettersson | 1999 | Ullevi FK | discus, shot put |
| 444 | Bjarne Thysell | 1999 | Ärla IF | long-distance |
| 445 | Emelie Färdigh | 2000 | IF Göta | high jump |
| 446 | Robert Kronberg | 2000 | IF Kville | hurdles |
| 447 | Maria Richtnér | 2000 | IF Göta | heptathlon |
| 448 | Staffan Strand | 2000 | Hässelby SK | high jump |
| 449 | Annika Amundin | 2001 | Ullevi FK | sprints |
| 450 | Camilla Benjaminsson | 2001 | Hässelby SK | long-distance |
| 451 | Martin Eriksson | 2001 | Hässelby SK | pole vault |
| 452 | Matias Ghansah | 2001 | Malmö AI | sprints, long jump |
| 453 | Andreas Gustafsson | 2001 | IF Hagen | shot put |
| 454 | Peter Häggström | 2001 | IK Ymer | long jump, sprints |
| 455 | Camilla Johansson | 2001 | IFK Växjö | triple jump, long jump |
| 456 | Patrik Kristiansson | 2001 | Örgryte IS | pole vault |
| 457 | Jimisola Laursen | 2001 | Malmö AI | sprints |
| 458 | Cecilia Nilsson | 2001 | IK Ymer | hammer |
| 459 | Mattias Borrman | 2002 | Västerås FK | discus |
| 460 | Susanna Kallur | 2002 | Falu IK | hurdles, sprints |
| 461 | Jimmy Nordin | 2002 | Malmö AI | shot put |
| 462 | Christian Olsson | 2002 | Örgryte IS | triple jump, high jump |
| 463 | Jörgen Zaki | 2002 | Malmö AI | middle-distance |
| 464 | Kirsten Belin | 2003 | Kvarnsvedens GoIF | pole vault |
| 465 | Mikael Jakobsson | 2003 | KFUM Örebro | hurdles |
| 466 | Bengt Johansson | 2003 | Turebergs FK | hammer |
| 467 | Jenny Kallur | 2003 | Falu IK | sprints, hurdles |
| 468 | Carolina Klüft | 2003 | IFK Växjö | heptathlon |
| 469 | Patrik Lövgren | 2003 | Malmö AI | sprints |
| 470 | Ida Nilsson | 2003 | Högby IF | middle-distance, long-distance |
| 471 | Linda Olsson | 2003 | Täby IS | middle-distance |
| 472 | Hanna-Mia Persson | 2003 | Kalmar SK | pole vault |
| 473 | Nadja Petersen | 2003 | Huddinge AIS | hurdles, sprints |
| 474 | Annika Petersson | 2003 | Edsbyns IF | javelin |
| 475 | Henrik Skoog | 2003 | Spårvägens FK | steeplechase |
| 476 | Marie Söderström-Lundberg | 2003 | Hässelby SK | long-distance |
| 477 | Henrik Wennberg | 2003 | Turebergs IF | shot put, discus |
| 478 | Johan Wissman | 2003 | IFK Helsingborg | sprints |
| 479 | Magnus Aare | 2004 | Danderyd Athletics | sprints, hurdles |
| 480 | Rizak Dirshe | 2004 | Hälle IF | middle-distance |
| 481 | Johan Engberg | 2004 | IF Göta | sprints |
| 482 | Erik Sjöqvist | 2004 | Enhörna IF | long-distance |
| 483 | Malin Öhrn | 2004 | IFK Växjö | long-distance |
| 484 | Mustafa Mohamed | 2005 | Hälle IF | steeplechase, long-distance |
| 485 | Erica Mårtensson | 2005 | IFK Växjö | hurdles |
| 486 | Lena Aruhn | 2006 | Ume Friidrott | sprints |
| 487 | Helena Engman | 2006 | Riviera Friidrott | shot put |
| 488 | Emma Green | 2006 | Örgryte IS | high jump |
| 489 | Daniel Ragnvaldsson | 2006 | IFK Strömsund | javelin |
| 490 | Alfred Shemweta | 2006 | Flemingsbergs SK | long-distance |
| 491 | Lena Gavelin | 2007 | Trångsvikens IF | long-distance |
| 492 | Alhaji Jeng | 2007 | Örgryte IS | pole vault |
| 493 | Christin Johansson | 2007 | IF Kville | steeplechase, long-distance |
| 494 | Linda Berglund | 2007 | IFK Växjö | pole vault |
| 495 | Linus Thörnblad | 2007 | IFK Lund | high jump |
| 496 | Anton Andersson | 2008 | Örgryte IS | triple jump |
| 497 | Mattias Claesson | 2008 | Hässelby SK | middle-distance |
| 498 | Beatrice Dahlgren | 2008 | Mölndals AIK | sprints |
| 499 | Magnus Arvidsson | 2009 | KA 2 IF | javelin |
| 500 | Ulrika Flodin | 2009 | Rånäs 4H | middle-distance, steeplechase |
| 501 | Hanna Karlsson | 2009 | Malmö AI | middle-distance, long-distance |
| 502 | Thomas Nikitin | 2009 | Spårvägens FK | sprints |
| 503 | Daniel Almgren | 2010 | Hässelby SK | decathlon |
| 504 | Niklas Arrhenius | 2010 | Spårvägens FK | discus, shot put |
| 505 | Per Jacobsen | 2010 | IF Göta | steeplechase |
| 506 | Oscar Janson | 2010 | Ullevi FK | pole vault |
| 507 | Philip Nossmy | 2010 | Malmö AI | hurdles |
| 508 | Jessica Samuelsson | 2010 | Hässelby SK | heptathlon |
| 509 | Isabellah Andersson | 2011 | Hässelby SK | long-distance |
| 510 | Tracey Andersson | 2011 | IFK Trelleborg | hammer |
| 511 | Lena Berntsson | 2011 | Ullevi FK | sprints, hurdles |
| 512 | Lisa Blommé | 2011 | Hässelby SK | long-distance |
| 513 | Mattias Jons | 2011 | Hässelby SK | hammer |
| 514 | Oskar Käck | 2011 | Hälle IF | long-distance |
| 515 | Emma Rienas | 2011 | IF Göta | sprints |
| 516 | Michel Tornéus | 2011 | IFK Tumba | long jump |
| 517 | Anders Szalkai | 2012 | Spårvägens FK | long-distance |
| 518 | Stefan Tärnhuvud | 2012 | Sundsvalls Friidrott | sprints |
| 519 | Gabriel Wallin | 2012 | Södertälje IF | javelin |
| 520 | Charlotte Schönbeck | 2012 | IFK Lidingö | middle-distance |
| 521 | Catarina Andersson | 2013 | Hässelby SK | shot put |
| 522 | Nil de Oliveira | 2013 | Spårvägens FK | sprints |
| 523 | Moa Hjelmer | 2013 | Spårvägens FK | sprints |
| 524 | Ebba Jungmark | 2013 | Mölndals AIK | high jump |
| 525 | Nicklas Wiberg | 2014 | FI Kalmarsund | decathlon |
| 526 | Abeba Aregawi | 2014 | Hammarby IF | middle-distance |
| 527 | Nadja Casadei | 2014 | IFK Lidingö | heptathlon |
| 528 | Charlotta Fougberg | 2014 | Ullevi FK | middle-distance, long-distance |
| 529 | Erica Jarder | 2014 | Spårvägens FK | long jump |
| 530 | Adil Bouafif | 2014 | Hässelby SK | middle-distance, long-distance |
| 531 | Malin Dahlström | 2014 | Ullevi FK | pole vault |
| 532 | Olle Walleräng | 2014 | Spårvägens FK | middle-distance, long-distance |
| 533 | Kim Amb | 2015 | Bålsta IK | javelin |
| 534 | Leif Arrhenius | 2015 | Spårvägens FK | shot put, discus |
| 535 | Meraf Bahta | 2015 | Hälle IF | middle-distance, long-distance |
| 536 | Angelica Bengtsson | 2015 | Hässelby SK | pole vault |
| 537 | Ellinore Hallin | 2015 | IFK Växjö | combined |
| 538 | Sofia Larsson | 2015 | Ullevi FK | discus |
| 539 | Petter Olson | 2015 | Hässelby SK | combined |
| 540 | Andreas Otterling | 2015 | KFUM Örebro | long jump, triple jump |
| 541 | Frida Persson | 2015 | Hammarby IF | hurdles |
| 542 | Johan Rogestedt | 2015 | Stenungsunds Friidrott | middle-distance, long-distance |
| 543 | Mikael Ekvall | 2016 | Strömstad LK | long-distance |
| 544 | Sofi Flink | 2016 | Västerås FK | javelin |
| 545 | Tom Kling-Baptiste | 2016 | Huddinge AIS | sprints |
| 546 | Mehdi Katib | 2016 | Hellas FK | high jump |
| 547 | Daniel Ståhl | 2016 | Spårvägens FK | discus, shot put |
| 548 | Lovisa Lindh | 2017 | Ullevi FK | middle-distance |
| 549 | Michaela Meijer | 2017 | Örgryte IS | pole vault |
| 550 | Fanny Roos | 2017 | Ljungby FIK | shot put |
| 551 | Khaddi Sagnia | 2017 | Ullevi FK | long jump |
| 552 | Sofie Skoog | 2017 | IF Göta | high jump |
| 553 | Anna Wessman | 2017 | IFK Växjö | javelin |
| 554 | Alexander Brorsson | 2017 | IFK Växjö | hurdles |
| 555 | Andreas Almgren | 2018 | Turebergs FK | middle-distance |
| 556 | Sarah Lahti | 2018 | Hässelby SK | middle-distance, long-distance |
| 557 | Daniel Lundgren | 2018 | Turebergs FK | steeplechase, long-distance |
| 558 | Linn Nilsson | 2018 | Hälle IF | middle-distance, long-distance |
| 559 | Odain Rose | 2018 | IFK Umeå | sprints |
| 560 | Kalle Berglund | 2019 | Spårvägens FK | middle-distance |
| 561 | Armand Duplantis | 2019 | Upsala IF | pole vault |
| 562 | Erika Kinsey | 2019 | Trångsvikens IF | high jump |
| 563 | Andreas Kramer | 2019 | Sävedalens AIK | middle-distance |
| 564 | Malin Marmbrandt | 2019 | Västerås FK | long jump, triple jump |
| 565 | Ida Storm | 2019 | Malmö AI | hammer |
| 566 | Melker Svärd Jacobsson | 2019 | Malmö AI | pole vault |
| 567 | Elin Westerlund | 2019 | Spårvägens FK | hurdles |
| 568 | Josefin Magnusson | 2016 | Malmö AI | sprints |
| 569 | Irene Ekelund | 2020 | Malmö AI | sprints |
| 570 | Felix Francois | 2020 | Örgryte IS | sprints |
| 571 | Jonas Glans | 2020 | Malmö AI | middle-distance, long-distance |
| 572 | Thobias Montler | 2020 | Malmö AI | long jump |
| 573 | Yolanda Ngarambe | 2020 | Turebergs FK | middle-distance, long-distance |
| 574 | David Nilsson | 2020 | Högby IF | middle-distance, long-distance |
| 575 | Fredrik Samuelsson | 2020 | Hässelby SK | combined |
| 576 | Napoleon Solomon | 2020 | Turebergs FK | middle-distance, long-distance |
| 577 | Frida Åkerström | 2021 | Hässelby SK | discus, shot put |
| 578 | Hanna Hermansson | 2022 | Turebergs FK | middle-distance, long-distance |
| 579 | Daniella Busk | 2022 | Malmö AI | sprints |
| 580 | Henrik Larsson | 2022 | IF Göta | sprints |
| 581 | Hanna Palmqvist | 2022 | Mölndals AIK | high hurdles |
| 582 | Wictor Petersson | 2022 | Malmö AI | shot put |
| 583 | Simon Pettersson | 2022 | Hässelby SK | discus |
| 584 | Bianca Salming | 2022 | Turebergs FK | combined |
| 585 | Carl Bengtström | 2023 | Örgryte IS | sprints, hurdles |
| 586 | Sara Christiansson | 2023 | Sävedalens AIK | middle-distance, long-distance |
| 587 | Erik Ehrlin | 2023 | Hammarby IF | triple jump |
| 588 | Nick Ekelund-Arenander | 2023 | Malmö AI | sprints |
| 589 | Max Hrelja | 2023 | Malmö AI | high hurdles |
| 590 | Erik Martinsson | 2023 | Upsala IF | middle-distance |
| 591 | Samrawit Mengsteab | 2023 | Hälle IF | middle-distance, long-distance |
| 592 | Marcus Nilsson | 2023 | Högby IF | combined |
| 593 | Simon Sundström | 2023 | IFK Lidingö | middle-distance, long-distance |
| 594 | Oscar Vestlund | 2023 | IF Göta | hammer |

== See also ==
- List of bandy players awarded Stora Grabbars och Tjejers Märke
- List of footballers awarded Stora Grabbars och Tjejers Märke
- List of ice hockey players awarded Stora Grabbars och Tjejers Märke
- List of skiers awarded Stora grabbars och tjejers märke
