= Swedish Athletics Championships =

National athletics competition

- Sport: Track and field
- Founded: 1896
- Country: Sweden

The Swedish Athletics Championships (Swedish: Svenska mästerskapen i friidrott) is an annual outdoor track and field competition organised by the Swedish Athletics Association, which serves as the national championship for the sport in Sweden.

== History ==
The first Swedish Athletics Championships were held at Fridhem in Helsingborg, 7–9 August 1896 with twelve athletics events: the 100 metres, 1500 metres, 10,000 metres, 110 metres hurdles, high jump, grenhopp, long jump, pole vault, shot put, discus throw, javelin throw, and hammer throw; and other sports, namely wrestling, tug of war, football, tennis, and weightlifting. A separate Swedish Women's Athletics Championships was held starting in 1928, the first time at Strömvallen in Gävle. A non-official championship had been held in Lidköping the year before. From 1956 on, the women's event have been held at the Swedish Athletics Championships.

Separate annual championship events are held for cross country running, road running and racewalking events. There is also a Swedish Indoor Athletics Championships. There is also a Swedish Athletics Team Championship.

== Events ==
The competition programme features a total of 38 individual Swedish championship athletics events, 19 for men and 19 for women. For each of the sexes, there are seven track running events, three obstacle events, four jumps, four throws, one walking event.

Track running

- 100 metres, 200 metres, 400 metres, 800 metres, 1500 metres, 5000 metres, 10,000 metres

Obstacle events

- 100 metres hurdles (women only), 110 metres hurdles (men only), 400 metres hurdles, 3000 metres steeplechase

Jumping events

- Pole vault, high jump, long jump, triple jump

Throwing events

- Shot put, discus throw, javelin throw, hammer throw

Racewalking

- 5000 metres race walk (women only), 10,000 metres race walk (men only)

The combined events, men's decathlon and women's heptathlon, as well as para athletics events may be included or held separately. Of the other Olympic events, the 4 × 100 metres relay and 4 × 400 metres relay events are contested at thee Swedish Athletics Relay Championship, the marathon events are contested at the Swedish Marathon Championship, and the 20 km race walk events are contested at the Swedish Racewalking Championship, while the mixed 4 × 400 m relay and mixed marathon walk relay events are not contested.

A men's pentathlon featured on the programme from 1971 to 1987. The men's 10,000 metres race walk was held in 1960, but went through periods of being dropped from the programme. A 5000 m walk for men was held from 1970 to 1976.

The women's programme gradually expanded to match the men's. On the track, the 1500 m was added in 1969, the 3000 metres in 1972 and the 10,000 metres in 1985. The 3000 m was replaced with the international standard 5000 m in 1995. Similarly, the women's pentathlon was replaced by the heptathlon in 1980. The 80 metres hurdles was contested until 1969, after which the international standard distance of 100 m hurdles was used. A 400 m hurdles event was introduced in 1970. The women's field events reached parity with the men's after the addition of triple jump in 1990, and hammer throw and pole vault in 1996. From the period 1969–86 women had two track walking events over 3000 m and 5000 m, with the shorter event being dropped later. The women's steeplechase was the last event to be added to the schedule, with women first competing in a national championship event in 2001.

== Editions ==
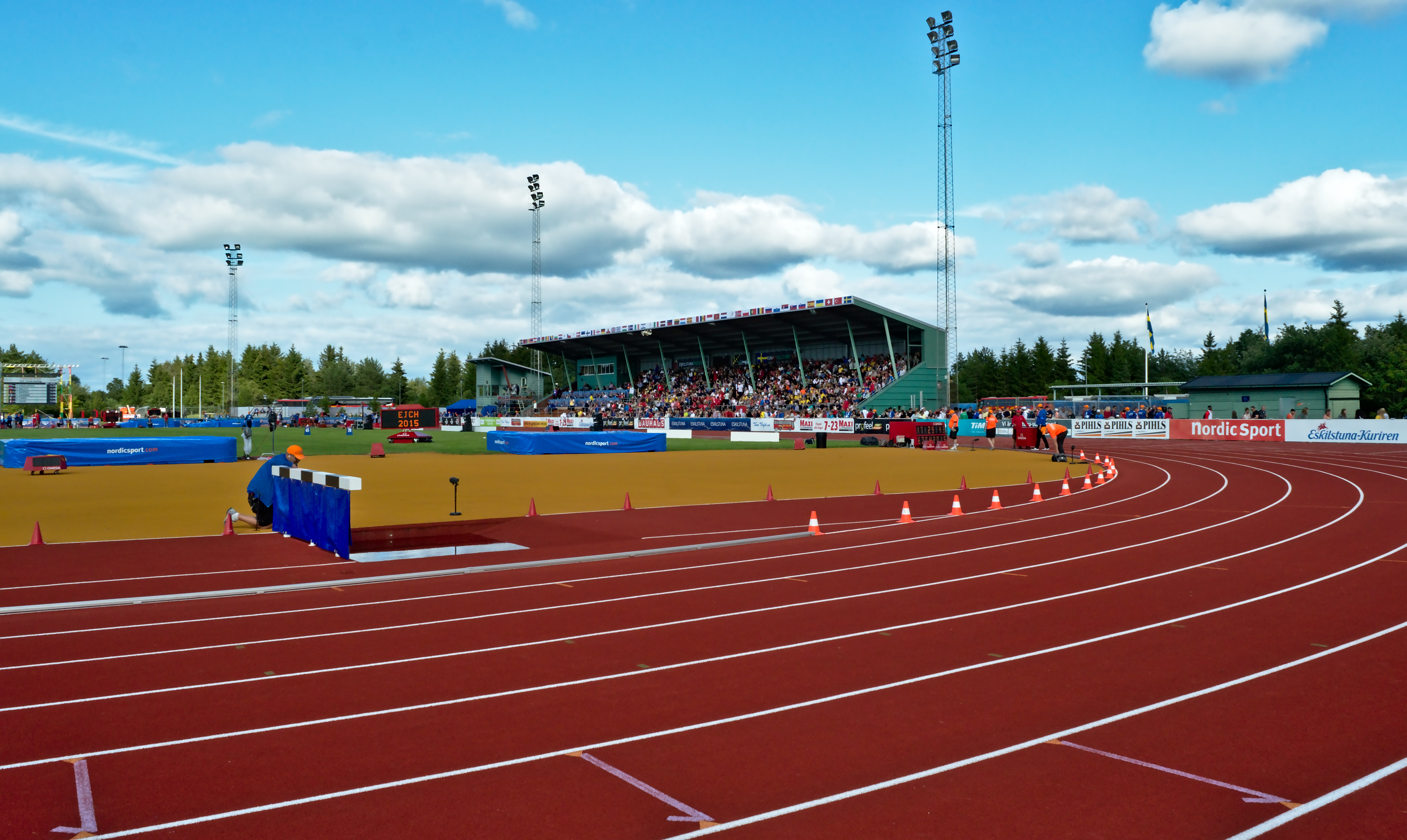
Ekängens IP, venue of the 2007 and 2018 editions of the Swedish Athletics Championships

Ed.	Year	City	Main venue	Organiser(s)	Ref.
1	1896	Helsingborg	Fridhem	Organisational committee	
2	1897	Gothenburg	Velocipedklubbens IP	Örgryte IS	
3	1898	Stockholm	Idrottsparken	Djurgårdens IF and Stockholms AF	
4	1899	Gothenburg	Velocipedklubbens IP	GAIS and Göteborgs FF	
5	1900	Stockholm	Idrottsparken	AIK	
6	1901	Gothenburg	Göteborgs Idrottsförbunds IP	Göteborgs Idrottsförbund and IS Lyckans Soldater	
7	1902	Jönköping	Stadsparksvallen	Jönköpings AIF	
8	1903	Gothenburg	Balders hage	Örgryte IS	
9	1904	Örebro	Örnsro IP	IFK Örebro	
10	1905	Helsingborg	Olympia	IS Göta and IFK Helsingborg	
11	1906	Norrköping	Norrköpings Idrottspark	IFK Örebro	
12	1907	Karlstad	temporary stadium in Våxnäs	Organisational committee	
13	1908	Eskilstuna	Djurgårdens IP	IFK Eskilstuna and IF Sport	
14	1909	Gothenburg	Walhalla IP	Svenska Idrottsförbundet	
15	1910	Falun	Kvarnbergets IP	Falu IS	
16	1911	Jönköping	Stadsparksvallen	Jönköpings IS	
17	1912	Stockholm	Olympic Stadium	AIK	
18	1913	Gothenburg	Walhalla IP	Örgryte IS	
19	1914	Örebro	Örnsro IP	IFK Örebro	
20	1915	Gävle	Strömdalens IP	Gefle IF	
21	1916	Malmö	Malmö IP	Malmö AI	
22	1917	Stockholm	Olympic Stadium	Fredrikshofs IF, IK Göta, Mariebergs IK and IFK Stockholm	
23	1918	Stockholm	Olympic Stadium	Fredrikshofs IF, IK Göta, Mariebergs IK and IFK Stockholm	
24	1919	Karlstad	Tingvalla IP	IF Göta	
25	1920	Stockholm	Olympic Stadium	Svenska Idrottsförbundet	
26	1921	Stockholm	Olympic Stadium	Svenska Idrottsförbundet	
27	1922	Stockholm	Olympic Stadium	Svenska Idrottsförbundet	
28	1923	Stockholm	Olympic Stadium	Svenska Idrottsförbundet	
29	1924	Stockholm	Olympic Stadium	Svenska Idrottsförbundet	
30	1925	Stockholm	Olympic Stadium	Svenska Idrottsförbundet	
31	1926	Stockholm	Olympic Stadium	Svenska Idrottsförbundet	
32	1927	Stockholm	Olympic Stadium	Svenska Idrottsförbundet	
33	1928	Stockholm	Olympic Stadium	Svenska Idrottsförbundet	
34	1929	Stockholm	Olympic Stadium	Svenska Idrottsförbundet	
35	1930	Stockholm	Olympic Stadium	Svenska Idrottsförbundet	
36	1931	Stockholm	Olympic Stadium	Svenska Idrottsförbundet	
37	1932	Stockholm	Olympic Stadium	Svenska Idrottsförbundet	
38	1933	Stockholm	Olympic Stadium	Svenska Idrottsförbundet	
39	1934	Stockholm	Olympic Stadium	Svenska Idrottsförbundet	
40	1935	Stockholm	Olympic Stadium	Svenska Idrottsförbundet	
41	1936	Stockholm	Olympic Stadium	Svenska Idrottsförbundet	
42	1937	Gothenburg	Slottsskogsvallen	Göteborgs KIK	
43	1938	Stockholm	Olympic Stadium	Svenska Idrottsförbundet	
44	1939	Stockholm	Olympic Stadium	Svenska Idrottsförbundet	
45	1940	Stockholm	Olympic Stadium	Svenska Idrottsförbundet	
46	1941	Stockholm	Olympic Stadium	Svenska Idrottsförbundet	
47	1942	Stockholm	Olympic Stadium	Svenska Idrottsförbundet	
48	1943	Stockholm	Olympic Stadium	Svenska Idrottsförbundet	
49	1944	Stockholm	Olympic Stadium	Svenska Idrottsförbundet	
50	1945	Stockholm	Olympic Stadium	Swedish Athletics Association	
51	1946	Stockholm	Olympic Stadium	Swedish Athletics Association	
52	1947	Stockholm	Olympic Stadium	Swedish Athletics Association	
53	1948	Stockholm	Olympic Stadium	Swedish Athletics Association	
54	1949	Stockholm	Olympic Stadium	Swedish Athletics Association	
55	1950	Stockholm	Olympic Stadium	Swedish Athletics Association	
56	1951	Stockholm	Olympic Stadium	Swedish Athletics Association	
57	1952	Stockholm	Olympic Stadium	Swedish Athletics Association	
58	1953	Stockholm	Olympic Stadium	Swedish Athletics Association	
59	1954	Stockholm	Olympic Stadium	Swedish Athletics Association	
60	1955	Stockholm	Olympic Stadium	Swedish Athletics Association	
61	1956	Stockholm	Olympic Stadium	Swedish Athletics Association	
62	1957	Stockholm	Olympic Stadium	Swedish Athletics Association	
63	1958	Stockholm	Olympic Stadium	Swedish Athletics Association	
64	1959	Stockholm	Olympic Stadium	Swedish Athletics Association	
65	1960	Stockholm	Olympic Stadium	Swedish Athletics Association	
66	1961	Gothenburg	Nya Ullevi	Göteborgs Friidrottsförbund	
67	1962	Gothenburg	Nya Ullevi	Göteborgs Friidrottsförbund	
68	1963	Stockholm	Olympic Stadium	Swedish Athletics Association	
69	1964	Malmö	Malmö Stadium	Swedish Athletics Association	
70	1965	Västerås	Arosvallen	Västerås IK	
71	1966	Stockholm	Olympic Stadium	Stockholms Friidrottsförbund	
72	1967	Skövde	Södermalms IP	IF Hagen	
73	1968	Malmö	Malmö Stadium	Heleneholms IF	
74	1969	Sollentuna	Sollentunavallen	Turebergs IF	
75	1970	Växjö	Värendsvallen	IFK Växjö	
76	1971	Sollentuna	Sollentunavallen	Turebergs IF	
77	1972	Umeå	Gammliavallen	IFK Umeå	
78	1973	Västerås	Arosvallen	Västerås IK	
79	1974	Helsingborg	Hedens IP	IFK Helsingborg	
80	1975	Karlstad	Tingvalla IP	IF Göta	
81	1976	Gothenburg	Slottsskogsvallen	Göteborgs Friidrottsförbund	
82	1977	Skellefteå	Anderstorps IP	Skellefteå AIK	
83	1978	Stockholm	Olympic Stadium	Stockholms Friidrottsförbund	
84	1979	Malmö	Malmö Stadium	Heleneholms IF	
85	1980	Stockholm	Olympic Stadium	Turebergs IF and Stockholms Friidrottsförbund	
86	1981	Skövde	Södermalms IP	IF Hagen	
87	1982	Piteå	Kvarnvallen	Riviera Friidrott	
88	1983	Örebro	GIH:s IP	KFUM Örebro	
89	1984	Växjö	Värendsvallen	IFK Växjö	
90	1985	Västerås	Arosvallen	IK VIK-friidrott	
91	1986	Karlskrona	Västra Marks IP	KA 2 IF	
92	1987	Gävle	Gavlestadion	Gefle IF	
93	1988	Eskilstuna	Tunavallen	Råby-Rekarne GIF and Ärla IF	
94	1989	Borås	Ryavallen	IK Ymer	
95	1990	Karlstad	Tingvalla IP	IF Göta	
96	1991	Helsingborg	Hedens IP	IFK Helsingborg	
97	1992	Umeå	Gammliavallen	IFK Umeå	
98	1993	Borlänge	Kvarnsvedens IP	Kvarnsvedens GoIF	
99	1994	Gothenburg	Nya Ullevi	Göteborgs Friidrottsförbund	
100	1995	Sollentuna	Sollentunavallen	Turebergs IF	
101	1996	Karlskrona	Västra Marks IP	KA 2 IF	
102	1997	Sundsvall	Baldershofs IP	Sundsvalls Friidrott	
103	1998	Stockholm	Olympic Stadium	Stockholms Friidrottsförbund	
104	1999	Malmö	Heleneholms IP	Heleneholms IF	
105	2000	Uppsala	Studenternas IP	Upsala IF	
106	2001	Växjö	Värendsvallen	IFK Växjö	
107	2002	Gävle	Gavlestadion	Gefle IF	
108	2003	Norrtälje	Norrtälje sportcentrum	Rånäs 4H	
109	2004	Karlstad	Tingvalla IP	IFK Göta	
110	2005	Helsingborg	Hedens IP	IFK Helsingborg	
111	2006	Sollentuna	Sollentunavallen	Turebergs FK	
112	2007	Eskilstuna	Ekängens IP	Råby-Rekarne Friidrott	
113	2008	Västerås	Arosvallen	Västerås FK	
114	2009	Malmö	Malmö Stadium	Heleneholms IF, Malmö AI and IK Pallas	
115	2010	Falun	Lugnets IP	Falu IK	
116	2011	Gävle	Gavlestadion	Gefle IF	
117	2012	Stockholm	Olympic Stadium	Stadionklubbarna	
118	2013	Borås	Ryavallen	IK Ymer	
119	2014	Umeå	Campus Arena	IFK Umeå	
120	2015	Söderhamn	Hällåsen	Söderhamns IF	
121	2016	Sollentuna	Sollentunavallen	Turebergs FK	
122	2017	Helsingborg	Hedens IP	IFK Helsingborg	
123	2018	Eskilstuna	Ekängens IP	Eskilstuna Friidrottsallians	
124	2019	Karlstad	Tingvalla IP	IF Göta	
125	2020	Uppsala	Uppsala friidrottsarena	Upsala IF	
126	2021	Borås	Ryavallen	IK Ymer	
127	2022	Norrköping	Norrköpings friidrottsarena	Tjalve IF Norrköping	
128	2023	Söderhamn	Hällåsen	Söderhamns IF	
129	2024	Uddevalla	Rimnersvallen	IK Orient	
130	2025	Karlstad and Kil		IF Göta and Kils AIK	
131	2026	Uppsala	Uppsala Friidrottsarena	Upsala IF	

== Championships records ==
=== Men ===
As of 2026:

Event	Record	Athlete/Team	Club	Date	Location	Ref.
100 m	10.13 (+0.9 m/s) NR	Henrik Larsson	IF Göta	28 July 2023	Söderhamn	
200 m	20.44 (+1.1 m/s)	Henrik Larsson	IF Göta	26 July 2026	Uppsala	
400 m	45.68	Jimisola Laursen	Malmö AI	19 August 2000	Uppsala	
800 m	1:45.14	Andreas Kramer	Djurgårdens IF	3 August 2025	Karlstad	
1500 m	3:34.55	Andreas Almgren	Turebergs FK	29 July 2023	Söderhamn	
5000 m	13:30.13	Emil Danielsson	Spårvägens FK	30 July 2023	Söderhamn	
10,000 m	28:40.37	Mats Erixon	Mölndals AIK	29 September 1984	Stockholm	
3000 m steeplechase	8:22.03	Leo Magnusson	Sävedalens AIK	28 June 2024	Uddevalla	
110 m hurdles	13.45 (±0.0 m/s)	Robert Kronberg	IF Kville	24 August 2001	Växjö	
400 m hurdles	48.44	Oskar Edlund	Täby IS	26 July 2026	Uppsala	
High jump	2.32 m	Stefan Holm	Kils AIK	18 August 2002	Gävle	
High jump	2.32 m	Stefan Holm	Kils AIK	2 August 2008	Västerås	
Pole vault	5.80 m	Patrik Kristiansson	KA 2 IF	3 August 2003	Norrtälje	
Long jump	8.15 m (±0.0 m/s)	Thobias Montler	Malmö AI	16 August 2020	Uppsala	
Triple jump	17.54 m (+0.4 m/s)	Christian Olsson	Örgryte IS	1 August 2003	Norrtälje	
Shot put	20.90 m	Wictor Petersson	Malmö AI	1 August 2025	Karlstad	
Discus throw	70.42 m	Simon Pettersson	Hässelby SK	6 August 2022	Norrköping	
Hammer throw	78.70 m	Tore Gustafsson	Mölndals AIK	30 July 1989	Borås	
Javelin throw	86.24 m	Patrik Bodén	IF Göta	30 July 1994	Gothenburg	
10,000 m walk	39:19.5 h	Perseus Karlström	Eskilstuna Friidrott	8 August 2015	Gothenburg	

=== Women ===
As of 2026:

Event	Record	Athlete	Club	Date	Location	Ref.
100 m	11.19 (+1.5 m/s)	Nora Lindahl	Hässelby SK	24 July 2026	Uppsala	
200 m	22.81 (+1.6 m/s)	Julia Henriksson	Malmö AI	3 August 2025	Karlstad	
400 m	51.58	Moa Hjelmer	Spårvägens FK	13 August 2011	Gävle	
800 m	2:00.68	Malin Ewerlöf	Spårvägens FK	7 August 1999	Malmö	
1500 m	4:05.09	Vera Sjöberg	Täby IS	2 August 2025	Karlstad	
5000 m	15:25.80	Vera Sjöberg	Täby IS	3 August 2025	Karlstad	
10,000 m	32:45.26	Midde Hamrin	Mölndals AIK	5 August 1990	Karlstad	
3000 m steeplechase	9:28.99	Emilia Lillemo	Täby IS	28 June 2024	Uddevalla	
100 m hurdles	12.68 (−0.9 m/s)	Ludmila Engquist	IFK Lidingö	10 August 1996	Karlskrona	
400 m hurdles	55.45	Monica Westén	IF Göta	5 August 1990	Karlstad	
High jump	2.04 m	Kajsa Bergqvist	Turebergs FK	16 July 2006	Sollentuna	
Pole vault	4.71 m	Angelica Bengtsson	Hässelby SK	15 August 2020	Uppsala	
Long jump	6.93 m (+0.3 m/s)	Khaddi Sagnia	Ullevi FK	28 August 2021	Borås	
Triple jump	14.14 m (+1.8 m/s)	Camilla Johansson	IFK Växjö	19 August 2000	Uppsala	
Shot put	19.37 m	Fanny Roos	Malmö AI	24 July 2026	Uppsala	
Discus throw	64.26 m	Vanessa Kamga	Hässelby SK	25 July 2026	Uppsala	
Hammer throw	70.85 m	Rebecka Hallerth	Spårvägens FK	30 June 2024	Uddevalla	
Javelin throw	58.88 m	Sofi Flink	Västerås FK	24 August 2018	Eskilstuna	
5000 m walk	21:32.3 h	Madelein Svensson	Forsmo IF	13 August 1992	Sollefteå	
