= Idrottsföreningen Kamraterna =

Central organization for sports clubs in Sweden

IFK Emblems

Star

Flag

Idrottsföreningen Kamraterna (English: Sporting Society Comrades), usually abbreviated IFK, is a central organisation for many sports clubs in Sweden. There are also eight IFK clubs in Finland but they are organised separately. The Swedish IFK was founded 1 February 1895 and has 164 member clubs with around 100,000 members as of 2004. The best known IFK club in football is widely recognized as IFK Göteborg, which won the UEFA Cup twice in the 1980s. In ice hockey, the most successful IFK club is IFK Helsingfors from Helsinki, which have won the Finnish championship seven times.

== History ==
IFK was founded in Stockholm by two young students (Louis Zettersten and Pehr Ehnemark) that wanted to create a sports association, consisting of a main club in Stockholm with smaller clubs in other parts of the country. This was in a time when no nationwide sports organization or other larger associations existed. An advertisement in the youth paper Kamraten (The Comrade) that was published 1 February 1895 called forth all sports interested boys and girls in Sweden to join the society. Less than two months later, clubs in Luleå, Härnösand, Uppsala, Jönköping, Gothenburg and Västerås had been founded, aside the main club in Stockholm. It was decided to name the society after the paper that made the creation possible.

The society grew fast and the administration was too heavy for IFK Stockholm to handle, so a central organisation was created in 1901. Championships and other activities for IFK clubs were arranged and were big tournaments in a time when there existed no central Swedish sports administration to handle nationwide events. Some of these Comrade championships died out as national championships were arranged, but in some sports they live on, for example in Bowling. Other member associations started their own competitions, the most notable being Vasaloppet arranged by IFK Mora and Lidingöloppet arranged by IFK Lidingö.

Aside from the IFK members in Sweden and the separately organised IFK members in Finland, there did also exist IFK associations in Denmark and Norway. The last active member in Denmark was IFK Aalborg that ceased to exist in the early 1990s, while the Norwegian member in Kristiania (Oslo) ended its activities early in the 20th century.

== Symbols and colours ==
IFK's colours are blue and white. They are used by almost all member clubs, and those clubs that do not use them have special permits from the central organisation for using other colours, like IFK Malmö that uses yellow and white or IFK Stockholm's blue and red kits. The colours are believed to symbolise innocence and loyalty as written, by the IFK society master, in Kamraten in 1899. Symbols used by IFK include the four-pointed star in blue or white, the blue shield with white stripe and the characteristically formed top with two rounded parts between three peaks which can be seen in most of the member clubs' badges, although some use other styles. The IFK flag is described as a blue and white Scandinavian cross on white background with a blue four-pointed star in the canton.

== Noted clubs ==
=== Sweden ===
- IFK Åmål
- IFK Arvidsjaur
- IFK Aspudden-Tellus
- IFK Berga
- IFK Björkö
- IFK Borgholm
- IFK Eskilstuna
- IFK Falköping
- IFK Fjärås
- IFK Göteborg
- IFK Hallsberg
- IFK Haninge
- IFK Hässleholm
- IFK Hjo
- IFK Kalix
- IFK Kalmar
- IFK Karlshamn
- IFK Klagshamn
- IFK Kristianstad
- IFK Kristinehamn
- IFK Kumla
- IFK Lammhult
- IFK Lidingö
- IFK Luleå
- IFK Malmö
- IFK Mariestad
- IFK Motala
- IFK Mora
- IFK Norrköping
- IFK Nyköping
- IFK Ölme
- IFK Örebro
- IFK Osby
- IFK Oskarshamn
- IFK Östersund
- IFK Simrishamn
- IFK Skoghall
- IFK Skövde
- IFK Stockholm
- IFK Stocksund
- IFK Strömsund
- IFK Sundsvall
- IFK Sunne
- IFK Tidaholm
- IFK Timrå
- IFK Trelleborg
- IFK Trollhättan
- IFK Tumba
- IFK Uddevalla
- IFK Umeå
- IFK Uppsala
- IFK Valla
- IFK Vänersborg
- IFK Värnamo
- IFK Värsås
- IFK Västerås
- IFK Västervik
- IFK Vaxholm
- IFK Växjö
- IFK Viksjö
- IFK Visby
- IFK Ystad
- Ulricehamns IFK

=== Finland ===
- Helsingfors IFK (commonly known as HIFK)
- IFK Mariehamn
- Vasa IFK (commonly known as VIFK)
- Åbo IFK (commonly known as ÅIFK)
- Grankulla IFK (commonly known as GrIFK)
- IFK Uleåborg (commonly known as UIFK)
- IFK Lepplax
- Viipurin IFK (1896–1927)
- IFK Björneborg (1919–2017)

== Achievements ==
- Swedish football championships: 31
  - IFK Göteborg 18
  - IFK Norrköping 13
  - IFK Eskilstuna 1
- Finnish Football Championships: 14
  - IFK Helsingfors 7
  - IFK Åbo 3
  - IFK Vasa 3
  - IFK Mariehamn 1
- UEFA Cup championships: 2
  - IFK Göteborg 2
- Finnish Ice Hockey Championships: 7
  - IFK Helsingfors 7
- Swedish Handball Championships: 9
  - IFK Kristianstad 8
  - IFK Lidingö 1
- Finnish Handball Championships: 11
  - IFK Helsingfors 10
  - IFK Grankulla 1
- Swedish Bandy Championships: 12
  - IFK Uppsala 11
  - IFK Motala 1
- Finnish Bandy Championships: 17
  - IFK Helsingfors 17

== Sources ==
- IFK's historik
- Josephson, Åke; Jönsson, Ingemar, eds. (2004). IFK Göteborg 1904–2004: en hundraårig blåvit historia genom elva epoker (in Swedish). Göteborg: IFK Göteborg. ISBN 91-631-4659-2.
