= Bertil Lundell =

Swedish ice hockey player

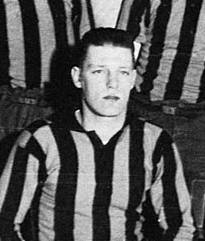
- Lundell on Hammarby Hockey's team photo in 1933.
- Born: Bertil Alexander Lundell; 6 September 1908; Stockholm, Sweden
- Died: 11 July 1996 (aged 87); Stockholm, Sweden
Ice hockey career
- Position: Defenceman
- Played for: Hammarby IF
- National team: Sweden
- Playing career: 1929–1942
Association football career
- Position: Defender
Youth career
- –1928: IK Mode
Senior career*
Years	Team	Apps	(Gls)
1929–1941	Hammarby IF	210	(0)
- * Club domestic league appearances and goals
Bandy career
- Playing position: Defender
Senior career*
Years	Team	Apps^{†}	(Gls)^{†}
1928–1941	Hammarby		
- * Senior club appearances and goals counted for the domestic league only. † Appearances (Goals).

Bertil "Berra" Lundell (6 September 1908 – 11 July 1996) was a Swedish ice hockey, football and bandy player, known for representing Hammarby IF in all three sports.

He represented the Sweden national team in the men's hockey tournament at the 1936 Winter Olympics.

== Athletic career ==
=== Ice hockey ===
In 1929, Lundell started to play hockey with Hammarby IF in Elitserien, Sweden's top tier.

He won five Swedish championships – in 1932, 1933, 1936, 1937 and 1942 – with Hammarby, the club's first domestic titles in its history.

He retired from playing hockey in 1942. In total, Lundell made 183 competitive appearances for Hammarby IF, scoring 28 goals.

Lundell won 27 caps for the Sweden national team, and represented his country at four major tournaments, such as the 1936 Winter Olympics. He is a recipient of the honorary award Stora Grabbars Märke, which is handed out by Swedish Ice Hockey Association.

=== Football ===
Lundell started his football career as a youngster at local club IK Mode in Stockholm.

Between 1929 and 1941, Lundell made 210 league appearances as a solid defender for Hammarby IF, mostly in the Swedish second tier Division 2.

In 1939–40, Hammarby played one season in Allsvenskan, the domestic top league, with Lundell featuring in all 22 fixtures, but was relegated immediately.

=== Bandy ===
In 1928, Lundell took up bandy and helped establish Hammarby IF among the top bandy clubs in Sweden at the beginning of the 1930s.
