= Kurt Lundquist =

Swedish sprinter

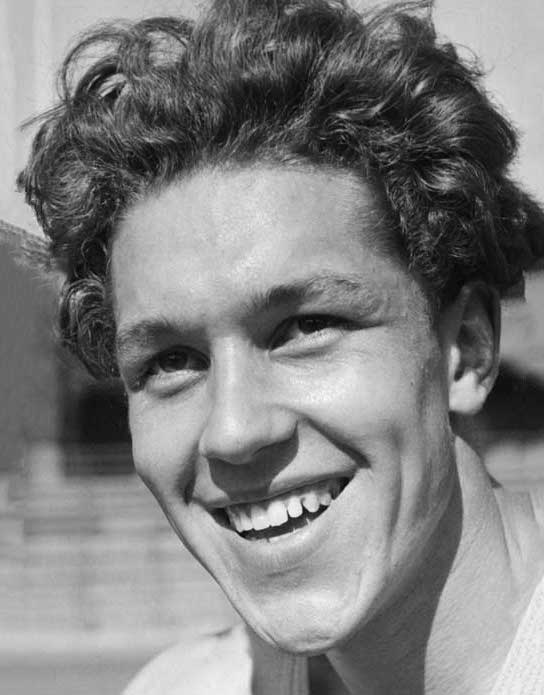

Personal information
- Born: 27 November 1925 Kila, Sweden
- Died: 12 July 2011 (aged 85) Simrishamn, Sweden
- Height: 190 cm (6 ft 3 in)
- Weight: 75 kg (165 lb)

Sport
- Sport: Athletics
- Event: Sprint
- Club: IK Mode

Achievements and titles
- Personal best: 400 m – 47.6 (1948)
Medal record
Representing Sweden
Olympic Games
Bronze medal – third place	1948 London	4×400 m relay

Kurt Anders Valdemar Lundquist (27 November 1925 – 12 July 2011) was a Swedish sprinter who won a bronze medal in the 4 × 400 m relay at the 1948 Olympics. Earlier in 1947, he won his only national title, in the 200 m.

Lunquist was born in Kila, Sweden (present Sala Municipality), represented IK Mode and died in Simrishamn.

== Competition record ==
Year	Competition	Venue	Position	Event	Notes
Representing Sweden
1948	Olympics	London, United Kingdom	4th, Heat 4, Round 2	400 m	48.4
