= Birgit Lundström =

Swedish discus thrower

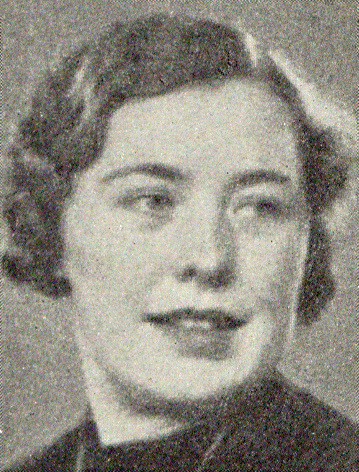

Personal information
- Born: 30 September 1911 Vallkära, Lund, Sweden
- Died: 4 May 2007 (aged 95) Lidingö, Sweden
- Height: 1.69 m (5 ft 7 in)
- Weight: 65 kg (143 lb)

Sport
- Sport: Athletics
- Event(s): Discus throw, javelin throw, shot put
- Club: Malmö AI

Achievements and titles
- Personal best(s): DT – 44.38 m (1938); JT – 31.33 m (1934)

Birgit Evelyn Lundström (later Nyhed, 30 September 1911 – 4 May 2007) was a Swedish athlete who mainly competed in the discus throw. In this event she finished sixth at the 1936 Summer Olympics and fourth at the 1938 European Athletics Championships.

Lundström was the Swedish champion in the discus throw (1935, 1937–41 and 1944), javelin throw (1934) and shot put (1941). In the discus she held the senior Swedish record and later the world record in the masters (80+) category (from 1992 to 2006). She was a member of the Swedish Athletics Association.
