= Carl Silfverstrand =

Swedish gymnast

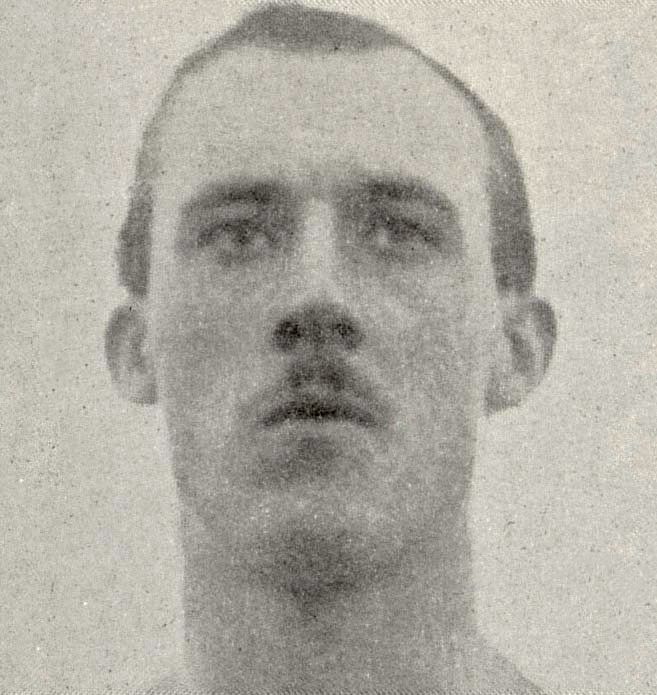
- Silfverstrand c. 1912

Personal information
- Full name: Carl Johan Silfverstrand
- Born: 9 October 1885 Helsingborg, United Kingdoms of Sweden and Norway
- Died: 2 January 1975 (aged 89) Helsingborg, Sweden

Gymnastics career
- Discipline: Men's artistic gymnastics
- Country represented: Sweden
- Club: Stockholms Gymnastikförening
Medal record
Men's artistic gymnastics
Representing Sweden
Olympic Games
Gold medal – first place	1912 Stockholm	Team, Swedish system

Carl Johan Silfverstrand (9 October 1885 – 2 January 1975) was a Swedish gymnast and track and field athlete who competed in the 1908 and 1912 Summer Olympics. In 1908, he finished tenth in the pole vault and twentieth long jump. In 1912, he was part of the Swedish gymnastics team that won the gold medal in the Swedish system event.

Born in Helsingborg, Silfverstrand first represented IS Göta. From 1907, as an athlete, he represented Djurgårdens IF. As a gymnast, he represented Stockholms GF. He won the grenhopp event at 1905 Swedish Athletics Championships and the long jump at the 1908 edition. He also set three Swedish records in mellanhopp – 3.89 m cm in 1907, 4.26 m in 1909 and 4.33 m in 1911. He finished third behind Ed Archibald in the pole jump event at the British 1908 AAA Championships. His personal bests in athletics were 3.30 m in the BV (1907), 6.59 m in the LJ (1909), and 11.1 in the 100 m (1910).

After retiring from competitions, he worked as a sports instructor in Finland (1919–20 and 1925–27), Denmark (1922–25) and Norway (1927–36). In 1933, he received Norwegian citizenship, and between 1936 and 1941, he worked as a physical therapist in Norway.

His brother Erik Silfverstrand was also an athlete and a three time Swedish champion on the 4x400 metre relay at the Swedish Athletics Championships 1916–1918 with Fredrikshofs IF.
