= Odmark =

Odmark or Ödmark is a surname. Notable people with the surname include:

- Åke Ödmark (1916–1994), Swedish high jumper
- Matt Odmark (born 1974), American musician
