= Alexander Brorsson =

Swedish sprinter (born 1990)

Alexander Brorsson (born 29 May 1990) is a Swedish athlete who specialized in the 110 metres hurdles and short sprint events. He competed at one European Championships and two European Indoor Championships, also taking four individual Swedish titles outdoors and two indoors.

== Career ==
Brorsson won his first medal at the Swedish indoor championships in 2009, a bronze. Having become Swedish U23 champion in 2011, he went on to his first Finland–Sweden International where he finished third. In 2012 he broke the 8-second barrier in the 60 metres hurdles as well as the 14-second barrier in the 110 metres. After becoming Swedish indoor champion in 7.88 he ran 7.82 in February 2012. He became double Swedish U23 champion (110 hurdles and 200 metres) before winning a gold and silver (110 hurdles and 100 metres) at the Swedish championships. He had run the hurdles in 13.99 seconds in June, and now recorded 13.98. At the Finland–Sweden International, Brorsson finished second in the high hurdles, third in the 100 metres and won the relay.

2013 would therefore see his continental debut. He started the indoor season with 7.86, then ran 7.73 in Malmö before competing at the 2013 European Indoor Championships without reaching the final. He ran the relay at the 2013 European Team Championships First League, and competed at the 2013 Summer Universiade, again without reaching the final.

Brorsson only won bronze in the hurdles at the 2014 Swedish indoor championships, but silver in the 200 metres; thus he ran the 200 metres and relay at the 2014 European Team Championships Super League. An equalling of his 13.98 personal best in Donnas was followed by his second Swedish title, achieving 13.86 in Umeå. He competed both individually and in the relay at the 2014 European Championships without reaching the final before winning the relay at the Finland–Sweden International.

Not competing indoors in 2015, he was a part of a Swedish relay team that tried to qualify for the 2015 World Championships, as a part of the pre-events at the 2015 Bislett Games, but the stick was fumbled and Brorsson crossed the finish line without the baton in hand, which entailed disqualification. He competed in relay and hurdles at the 2015 European Team Championships Super League, and as he studied at the Linnaeus University, he entered his second Universiade, where he was again knocked out in the heat. He finished the season by winning the Swedish championship as well as the relay race at the 2015 Finland–Sweden International. At the latter event, he also finished second in the hurdles and sixth in the 200.

2016 contained no continental competitions, but Brorsson took bronze at the Swedish indoor championships, won the Swedish championships and finished fourth in the Finland–Sweden International. At the 2017 Swedish indoor championships he ran 7.72 in the heats and won in 7.77 seconds, before he competed at the 2017 European Indoor Championships, again without reaching the final. 7.72 seconds was his lifetime best in the 60 metres hurdles. Outdoors, he only raced twice, but following a late season opener in July with 14.00 seconds, Brorsson set his lifetime best in August in Mölndal, clocking in 13.83 seconds.

He then had to sit out 2018 before making a comeback in 2019 to take bronze at the Swedish indoor championships and finish fifth at the Swedish championships. Following the 2020 Swedish indoor championships where Brorsson finished sixth, his retirement from the sport was definite. He was indicted into the Swedish version of the hall of fame, receiving a Stora grabbars märke.

His personal best times in the sprints were 6.73 seconds in the 60 metres, achieved in January 2013 in Örebro; 10.30 seconds in the 100 metres, achieved in June 2013 in Skara; and 21.06 seconds in the 200 metres, achieved in June 2014 in Sollentuna.

== Personal life ==
Brorsson comes from Ulricehamn. He left his family home in 2006 to attend upper secondary school in Växjö. He represented the club IFK Växjö.

In early 2010 he started struggling with panic attacks. Following months of ailment he moved home to Ulricehamn for a while, started on medicines and was gradually able to return to everyday tasks; walking around, riding the bus and visiting shops. He sat out the entire 2010 season, but returned to athletics after that. He later experienced another "mental crash" in 2018.

After retiring he worked as a self-employed businessman. He had a child.
