= Samuel Norrby =

Swedish shot putter

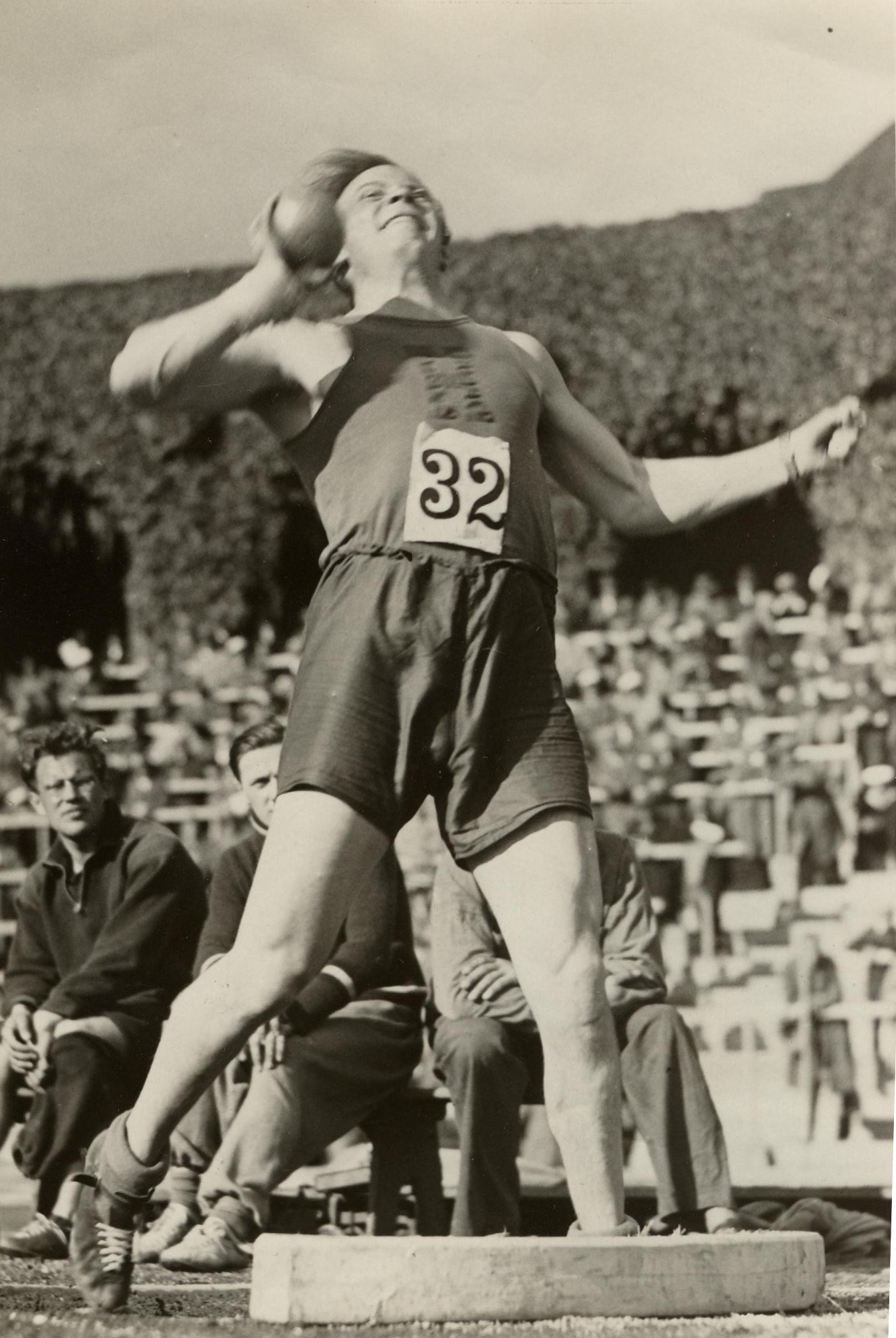

Personal information
- Born: 13 November 1906 Stockholm, Sweden
- Died: 28 November 1955 (aged 49)

Sport
- Sport: Athletics
- Event: Shot put
- Club: SoIK Hellas

Achievements and titles
- Personal best: 15.30 m (1933)

Samuel Norrby (13 November 1906 – 28 November 1955) was a Swedish shot putter who won five consecutive Swedish titles in 1930–34. He competed in the 1934 European Championships and placed fourth, 9 cm behind the bronze medal. In the 1950s Norrby held leading positions in the Swedish Athletics Association and was a member of parliament.
