= 2015 Bislett Games =

- Dates: 11 June 2015
- Host city: Oslo, Norway
- Venue: Bislett Stadium
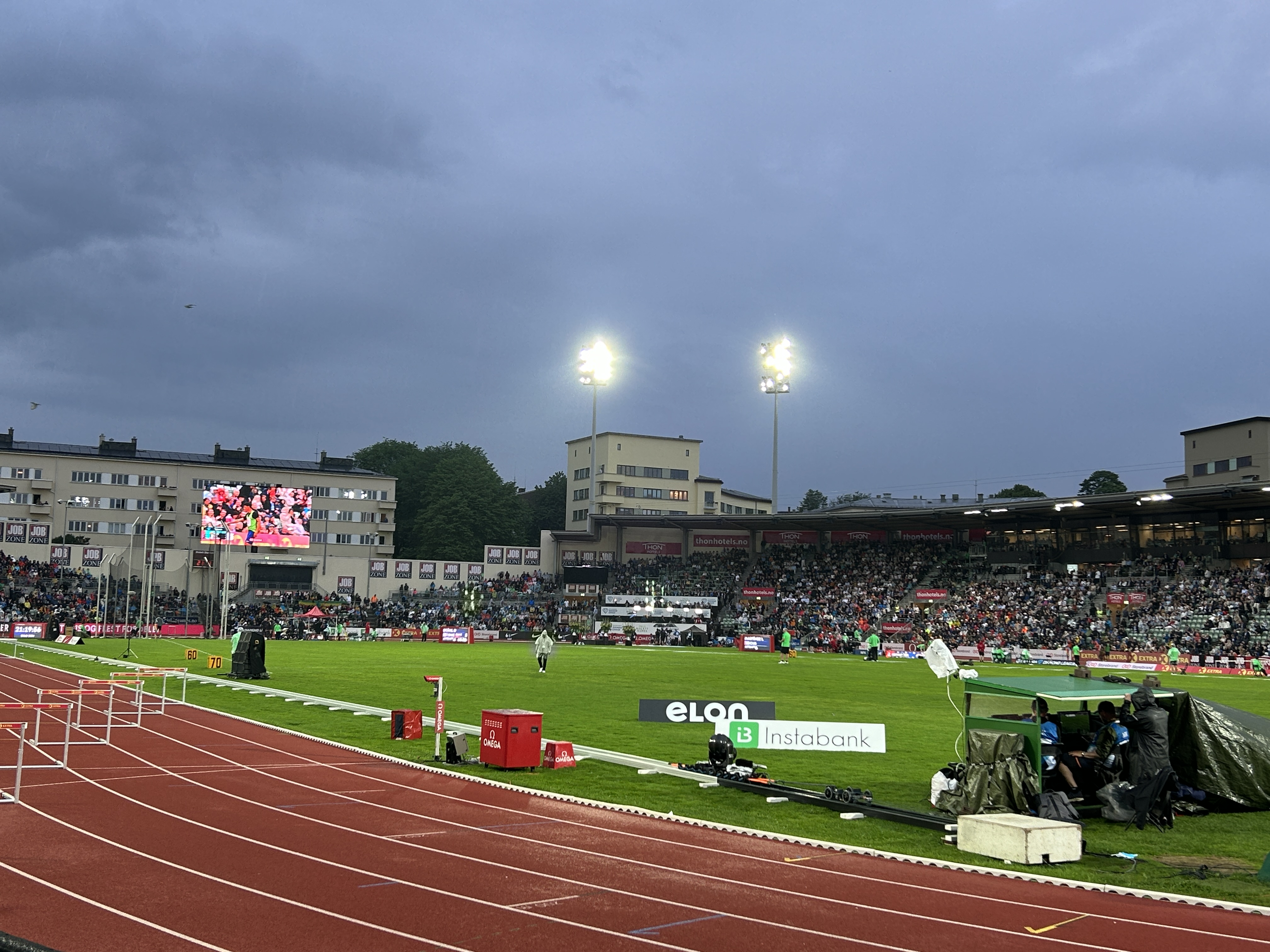
- Level: 2015 Diamond League

The 2015 Bislett Games was the 51st edition of the annual outdoor track and field meeting in Oslo, Norway. Held on 11 June at Bislett Stadium, it was the sixth leg of the 2015 Diamond League – the highest level international track and field circuit.

== Diamond discipline results ==
Podium finishers earned points towards a season leaderboard (4-2-1 respectively), points per event were then doubled in the Diamond League Finals. Athletes had to take part in the Diamond race during the finals to be eligible to win the Diamond trophy which is awarded to the athlete with the most points at the end of the season.

=== Men's ===
200 metres
Rank	Athlete	Nation	Time	Points	Notes
1st place, gold medalist(s)	Christophe Lemaitre	France	20.21	4	SB
2nd place, silver medalist(s)	Anaso Jobodwana	South Africa	20.39	2	
3rd place, bronze medalist(s)	Richard Kilty	Great Britain	20.54	1	
4	Carvin Nkanata	Kenya	20.77		
5	Karol Zalewski	Poland	20.89		
6	James Ellington	Great Britain	20.90		
7	Jaysuma Saidy Ndure	Norway	20.97		SB
—	Harry Adams	United States	DQ		R 163.3a
			Wind: (−1.2 m/s)		

400 metres
Rank	Athlete	Nation	Time	Points	Notes
1st place, gold medalist(s)	Steven Gardiner	Bahamas	44.64	4	PB
2nd place, silver medalist(s)	Matthew Hudson-Smith	Great Britain	45.09	2	SB
3rd place, bronze medalist(s)	Pavel Maslák	Czech Republic	45.39	1	SB
4	Martyn Rooney	Great Britain	45.46		
5	Isaac Makwala	Botswana	45.74		
6	Karsten Warholm	Norway	46.23		PB
7	Delano Williams	Great Britain	46.32		
8	Nick Ekelund-Arenander	Denmark	46.38		SB

Mile
Rank	Athlete	Nation	Time	Points	Notes
1st place, gold medalist(s)	Asbel Kiprop	Kenya	3:51.45	4	
2nd place, silver medalist(s)	Silas Kiplagat	Kenya	3:51.72	2	SB
3rd place, bronze medalist(s)	Pieter-Jan Hannes	Belgium	3:51.84	1	NR
4	Ayanleh Souleiman	Djibouti	3:52.69		
5	Ronald Kwemoi	Kenya	3:53.07		
6	Jakub Holuša	Czech Republic	3:53.46		PB
7	Henrik Ingebrigtsen	Norway	3:54.44		
8	Charles Philibert-Thiboutot	Canada	3:54.52		
9	Ryan Gregson	Australia	3:54.88		SB
10	Johan Cronje	South Africa	3:58.80		
—	Reuben Bett	Kenya	DNF		PM
—	Hillary Ngetich	Kenya	DNF		PM

3000 metres steeplechase
Rank	Athlete	Nation	Time	Points	Notes
1st place, gold medalist(s)	Jairus Birech	Kenya	8:05.63	4	
2nd place, silver medalist(s)	Conseslus Kipruto	Kenya	8:11.92	2	
3rd place, bronze medalist(s)	Paul Kipsiele Koech	Kenya	8:12.20	1	
4	Hillary Yego	Kenya	8:18.01		SB
5	Donn Cabral	United States	8:19.07		PB
6	Brahim Taleb	Morocco	8:21.33		PB
7	Krystian Zalewski	Poland	8:22.44		
8	Jonathan Ndiku	Kenya	8:25.80		
9	Ángel Mullera	Spain	8:27.95		
10	Ezekiel Kemboi	Kenya	8:30.07		
11	Barnabas Kipyego	Kenya	8:30.70		
12	Sisay Korme	Ethiopia	8:32.54		
13	Bjørnar Ustad Kristensen	Norway	8:49.53		
—	Haron Lagat	Kenya	DNF		PM
—	Clement Kemboi	Kenya	DNF		PM

High jump
Rank	Athlete	Nation	Height	Points	Notes
1st place, gold medalist(s)	Zhang Guowei	China	2.36 m	4	
2nd place, silver medalist(s)	Marco Fassinotti	Italy	2.33 m	2	=NR
3rd place, bronze medalist(s)	Mutaz Barsham	Qatar	2.33 m	1	
3rd place, bronze medalist(s)	Erik Kynard	United States	2.33 m	1	
5	Bohdan Bondarenko	Ukraine	2.33 m		
6	Derek Drouin	Canada	2.29 m		
6	Daniil Tsyplakov	Russia	2.29 m		SB
8	Ivan Ukhov	Russia	2.25 m		
9	Andriy Protsenko	Ukraine	2.25 m		
10	Mihai Donisan	Romania	2.25 m		
11	Donald Thomas	Bahamas	2.20 m		

Long jump
Rank	Athlete	Nation	Distance	Points	Notes
1st place, gold medalist(s)	Greg Rutherford	Great Britain	8.25 m (+0.0 m/s)	4	
2nd place, silver medalist(s)	Michael Hartfield	United States	8.04 m (+0.4 m/s)	2	
3rd place, bronze medalist(s)	Aleksandr Menkov	Russia	9.00 m (+2.2 m/s)	1	
4	Christian Taylor	United States	7.93 m (−0.6 m/s)		
5	Godfrey Khotso Mokoena	South Africa	7.90 m (−0.6 m/s)		
6	Zarck Visser	South Africa	7.85 m (+1.1 m/s)		
7	Michel Tornéus	Sweden	7.75 m (−0.5 m/s)		
8	Eusebio Cáceres	Spain	7.69 m (−1.1 m/s)		
Best wind-legal performances
	Aleksandr Menkov	Russia	7.66 m (−0.4 m/s)		

Discus throw
Rank	Athlete	Nation	Distance	Points	Notes
1st place, gold medalist(s)	Robert Urbanek	Poland	63.85 m	4	
2nd place, silver medalist(s)	Erik Cadée	Netherlands	62.32 m	2	
3rd place, bronze medalist(s)	Piotr Małachowski	Poland	62.32 m	1	
4	Christoph Harting	Germany	62.19 m		
5	Gerd Kanter	Estonia	61.18 m		
6	Ehsan Haddadi	Iran	60.46 m		
7	Martin Kupper	Estonia	60.43 m		
8	Sven Martin Skagestad	Norway	58.72 m		PB
9	Magnus Røsholm Berntsen	Norway	54.83 m		
10	Ola Stunes Isene	Norway	53.25 m		

=== Women's ===
100 metres
Rank	Athlete	Nation	Time	Points	Notes
1st place, gold medalist(s)	Murielle Ahouré-Demps	Ivory Coast	11.03	4	
2nd place, silver medalist(s)	Veronica Campbell Brown	Jamaica	11.08	2	SB
3rd place, bronze medalist(s)	Rosângela Santos	Brazil	11.27	1	
3rd place, bronze medalist(s)	Jessica Young-Warren	United States	11.27		SB
5	Asha Philip	Great Britain	11.35		
6	Ivet Lalova-Collio	Bulgaria	11.47		
7	Stella Akakpo	France	11.52		
8	Ezinne Okparaebo	Norway	11.53		
			Wind: (−0.6 m/s)		

1500 metres
Rank	Athlete	Nation	Time	Points	Notes
1st place, gold medalist(s)	Laura Muir	Great Britain	4:00.39	4	SB
2nd place, silver medalist(s)	Faith Kipyegon	Kenya	4:00.94	2	
3rd place, bronze medalist(s)	Dawit Seyaum	Ethiopia	4:02.90	1	
4	Abeba Aregawi	Sweden	4:03.07		
5	Gabriele Grunewald	United States	4:04.26		SB
6	Laura Weightman	Great Britain	4:04.70		SB
7	Renata Pliś	Poland	4:04.74		SB
8	Heather Kampf	United States	4:05.12		
9	Melissa Duncan	Australia	4:05.56		PB
10	Siham Hilali	Morocco	4:07.17		
11	Zoe Buckman	Australia	4:14.81		
—	Selma Kajan	Australia	DNF		PM

5000 metres
Rank	Athlete	Nation	Time	Points	Notes
1st place, gold medalist(s)	Genzebe Dibaba	Ethiopia	14:21.29	4	
2nd place, silver medalist(s)	Senbere Teferi	Ethiopia	14:38.57	2	PB
3rd place, bronze medalist(s)	Viola Kibiwot	Kenya	14:40.43	1	
4	Gelete Burka	Ethiopia	14:41.55		SB
5	Irene Chepet Cheptai	Kenya	15:03.84		
6	Susan Krumins	Netherlands	15:07.38		SB
7	Karoline Bjerkeli Grøvdal	Norway	15:15.18		PB
8	Magdalyne Masai	Kenya	15:16.17		
9	Jessica O'Connell	Canada	15:19.91		
10	Stephanie Twell	Great Britain	15:21.36		
11	Alisha Williams	United States	15:43.50		
12	Mimi Belete	Bahrain	15:45.12		SB
—	Tamara Tverdostup	Ukraine	DNF		PM
—	Katarzyna Broniatowska	Poland	DNF		PM

100 metres hurdles
Rank	Athlete	Nation	Time	Points	Notes
1st place, gold medalist(s)	Jasmin Stowers	United States	12.84	4	
2nd place, silver medalist(s)	Brianna Rollins-McNeal	United States	12.84	2	
3rd place, bronze medalist(s)	Queen Claye	United States	13.02	1	
4	Lolo Jones	United States	13.14		
5	Jacquelyn Coward	United States	13.18		
6	Alina Talay	Belarus	13.18		
7	Isabelle Pedersen	Norway	13.27		
8	Ida Bakke Hansen	Norway	14.20		
			Wind: (−1.4 m/s)		

400 metres hurdles
Rank	Athlete	Nation	Time	Points	Notes
1st place, gold medalist(s)	Kaliese Spencer	Jamaica	54.15	4	WL
2nd place, silver medalist(s)	Georganne Moline	United States	54.29	2	SB
3rd place, bronze medalist(s)	Zuzana Hejnová	Czech Republic	55.14	1	
4	Kemi Adekoya	Bahrain	55.37		
5	Denisa Helceletová	Czech Republic	55.60		
6	Eilidh Doyle	Great Britain	55.97		
7	Tiffany Williams	United States	56.28		
8	Hanna Titimets	Ukraine	57.46		

Triple jump
Rank	Athlete	Nation	Distance	Points	Notes
1st place, gold medalist(s)	Caterine Ibargüen	Colombia	14.68 m (−0.1 m/s)	4	
2nd place, silver medalist(s)	Gabriela Petrova	Bulgaria	14.57 m (−0.9 m/s)	2	
3rd place, bronze medalist(s)	Olha Saladukha	Ukraine	14.46 m (+0.3 m/s)	1	
4	Ekaterina Koneva	Russia	14.36 m (−1.2 m/s)		
5	Hanna Knyazyeva-Minenko	Israel	14.22 m (−1.3 m/s)		
6	Patrícia Mamona	Portugal	14.19 m (−0.9 m/s)		SB
7	Susana Costa	Portugal	13.58 m (−0.3 m/s)		
8	Keila Costa	Brazil	13.58 m (+0.1 m/s)		

Shot put
Rank	Athlete	Nation	Distance	Points	Notes
1st place, gold medalist(s)	Christina Schwanitz	Germany	20.14 m	4	
2nd place, silver medalist(s)	Michelle Carter	United States	19.20 m	2	SB
3rd place, bronze medalist(s)	Brittany Smith	United States	18.93 m	1	
4	Felisha Johnson	United States	18.66 m		
5	Tia Brooks	United States	18.54 m		
6	Cleopatra Borel	Trinidad and Tobago	18.50 m		
7	Anita Márton	Hungary	17.96 m		
8	Kristin Sundsteigen	Norway	13.87 m		

Javelin throw
Rank	Athlete	Nation	Distance	Points	Notes
1st place, gold medalist(s)	Marharyta Dorozhon	Israel	64.56 m	4	NR
2nd place, silver medalist(s)	Sunette Viljoen	South Africa	64.36 m	2	
3rd place, bronze medalist(s)	Barbora Špotáková	Czech Republic	64.10 m	1	SB
4	Martina Ratej	Slovenia	62.59 m		
5	Elizabeth Gleadle	Canada	61.84 m		
6	Kara Winger	United States	61.64 m		
7	Christina Obergföll	Germany	60.88 m		
8	Ásdís Hjálmsdóttir	Iceland	59.77 m		
9	Madara Palameika	Latvia	59.51 m		
10	Mariya Abakumova	Russia	57.68 m		

== National events results ==
=== Men's ===
100 metres
Rank	Athlete	Nation	Time	Notes
1st place, gold medalist(s)	Salum Ageze Kashafali	Norway	10.58	SB
2nd place, silver medalist(s)	Even Pettersen	Norway	10.60	PB
3rd place, bronze medalist(s)	Sebastian Salas Guillen Perez	Norway	10.84	
4	Jonas Tapani Halonen	Norway	10.86	SB
5	Kristoffer Buhagen	Norway	10.93	
6	Eirik Thorshaug	Norway	10.98	
7	Sondre Loftås Kåstad	Norway	11.10	
8	Abou Granli Diamonde	Norway	11.24	
			Wind: (−1.9 m/s)	

200 metres
Rank	Athlete	Nation	Time	Notes
1st place, gold medalist(s)	Even Meinseth	Norway	21.20	PB
2nd place, silver medalist(s)	Morten DalgåRD Madsen	Denmark	21.30	SB
3rd place, bronze medalist(s)	Kjell Håkon Morken	Norway	21.51	PB
4	Øyvind Strømmen Kjerpeset	Norway	21.62	SB
5	Jonathan Quarcoo	Norway	21.68	SB
6	Joachim Sandberg	Norway	21.70	PB
7	Carl Emil Kåshagen	Norway	21.75	
8	Ousman Touray	Norway	21.77	SB
			Wind: (−0.3 m/s)	

400 metres
Rank	Athlete	Nation	Time	Notes
1st place, gold medalist(s)	Andrew Steele	Great Britain	46.88	
2nd place, silver medalist(s)	Mauritz Kåshagen	Norway	47.62	SB
3rd place, bronze medalist(s)	Josh-Kevin Ramirez Talm	Norway	47.94	PB
4	Simen Sigurdsen	Norway	48.15	PB
5	Håkon Henriksen	Norway	48.31	
6	Jonas Grønnhaug	Norway	48.80	SB
7	Martin Loftås Kåstad	Norway	49.06	
8	Torbjörn Fossum Heldal	Norway	49.50	

800 metres
Rank	Athlete	Nation	Time	Notes
Heat 1
1st place, gold medalist(s)	Yeimer López	Cuba	1:46.13	
2nd place, silver medalist(s)	Andreas Bube	Denmark	1:47.40	
3rd place, bronze medalist(s)	Thomas Roth	Norway	1:47.77	
4	Hannes Naude	South Africa	1:48.02	
5	Denis Bäuerle	Germany	1:48.27	
6	Jan van den Broeck	Belgium	1:51.01	
—	Karol Konieczny	Poland	DNF	
—	Andreas Roth	Norway	DNF	
Heat 2
1st place, gold medalist(s)	Mattias Ohlsson	Sweden	1:50.74	
2nd place, silver medalist(s)	Kristian Uldbjerg Hansen	Denmark	1:50.97	
3rd place, bronze medalist(s)	Sigurd Blom Breivik	Norway	1:51.40	
4	Abduljaleel Mohamoud Ismail Hir	Norway	1:51.77	
5	Håvard Hildeskor	Norway	1:52.22	
6	Sverre Blom Breivik	Norway	1:54.27	
7	Elias Ottosen	Norway	1:57.35	
—	Torbjörn Fossum Heldal	Norway	DNF	

1500 metres
Rank	Athlete	Nation	Time	Notes
1st place, gold medalist(s)	Abdi Waiss Mouhyadin	Djibouti	3:40.05	SB
2nd place, silver medalist(s)	Awet Nftalem Kibrab	Eritrea	3:41.30	PB
3rd place, bronze medalist(s)	Dennis Licht	Netherlands	3:42.49	
4	Andreas Bueno	Denmark	3:42.71	
5	Snorre Holtan Løken	Norway	3:43.52	
6	Thijs Nijhuis	Denmark	3:44.61	
7	Sindre Buraas	Norway	3:44.67	
8	Erik Udø Pedersen	Norway	3:44.89	
9	Staffan Ek	Sweden	3:44.98	
10	Sindre Løchting	Norway	3:47.22	
11	James Hansen	Australia	3:47.48	
12	Edvard Kamperud Nygaard	Norway	3:50.40	
13	Magnus Hannevig Pettersen	Norway	3:50.69	
14	Jakob Ingebrigtsen	Norway	3:53.80	PB
—	Thobias Ekhamre	Sweden	DNF	PM
—	Johan Hydén	Sweden	DNF	
—	Terje Snarby	Norway	DNF	

Men's 4x100 Metres Relay
Place	Athlete	Nation	Time	Notes
1st place, gold medalist(s)	Salum Ageze Kashafali; Even Pettersen; Ousman Touray; Jonas Tapani Halonen	Norway	41.29	
2nd place, silver medalist(s)	Kenneth Vik Gulbrandsen; Lars Gausemel Stølen; Theo Halvorsen; Markus Nikolai Berner	Norway	42.52	
	Even Meinseth; Jonathan Quarcoo; Sebastian Salas Guillen Perez; Josh-Kevin Ramirez Talm	Norway	DNF	
	Odin Hallquist; Martin Nikolai Kanestrøm; Sivert Eikrem; William S. Rodahl	Norway	DNF	
	Mickey Joe; Nivethan Panchalingam; Riquelvis Rafael Santiago; Peter Efe Rasmussen Osazuwa	Norway	DQ	R 170.7
	Johan Wissman; Sulayman Bah; Alexander Brorsson; Tom Kling-Baptiste	Sweden	DQ	R 170.7

=== Women's ===
100 metres
Rank	Athlete	Nation	Time	Notes
1st place, gold medalist(s)	Naomi Van den Broeck	Belgium	11.69	PB
2nd place, silver medalist(s)	Mari Gilde Brubak	Norway	11.86	PB
3rd place, bronze medalist(s)	Ida Bakke Hansen	Norway	12.01	
4	Helene Rønningen	Norway	12.04	
5	Ingvild Meinseth	Norway	12.06	=PB
6	Anne Skudal Dolvik	Norway	12.16	
7	Tonje Fjellet Kristiansen	Norway	12.22	PB
8	Karin Busch	Norway	12.30	SB
			Wind: (+1.1 m/s)	

200 metres
Rank	Athlete	Nation	Time	Notes
1st place, gold medalist(s)	Naomi Van den Broeck	Belgium	23.92	PB
2nd place, silver medalist(s)	Frida Persson	Sweden	24.17	
3rd place, bronze medalist(s)	Anne Skudal Dolvik	Norway	24.58	
4	Mari Gilde Brubak	Norway	24.72	
5	Helene Rønningen	Norway	24.77	
6	Ingvild Meinseth	Norway	24.98	
7	Live Haugstad Hilton	Norway	25.08	PB
8	Madelen Andersen	Norway	26.36	
			Wind: (−0.9 m/s)	

400 metres
Rank	Athlete	Nation	Time	Notes
1st place, gold medalist(s)	Tara Marie Norum	Norway	53.89	SB
2nd place, silver medalist(s)	Benedicte Hauge	Norway	53.91	
3rd place, bronze medalist(s)	Emily Rose Norum	Norway	54.53	PB
4	Elisabeth Slettum	Norway	54.59	PB
5	Sara Dorthea Jensen	Norway	55.06	
6	Christine Bjelland Jensen	Norway	56.15	
7	Mari Drabløs	Norway	56.23	PB
8	Stine Meland Tomb	Norway	57.24	

800 metres
Rank	Athlete	Nation	Time	Notes
1st place, gold medalist(s)	Trine Mjåland	Norway	2:03.06	
2nd place, silver medalist(s)	Anna Silvander	Sweden	2:03.40	
3rd place, bronze medalist(s)	Malin Edland	Norway	2:03.44	PB
4	Yngvild Elvemo	Norway	2:03.79	
5	Laura Crowe	Ireland	2:03.97	SB
6	Ida Holm	Sweden	2:05.07	PB
7	Kelly Hetherington	Australia	2:05.16	
8	Ida Fillingsnes	Norway	2:05.95	PB
9	Linn Nilsson	Sweden	2:08.03	
—	Benedicte Hauge	Norway	DNF	

1500 metres
Rank	Athlete	Nation	Time	Notes
1st place, gold medalist(s)	Melissa Courtney-Bryant	Great Britain	4:17.49	
2nd place, silver medalist(s)	Amy Griffiths	Great Britain	4:20.15	
3rd place, bronze medalist(s)	Maria Larsen	Denmark	4:28.14	
4	Ingrid Folvik	Norway	4:29.12	
5	Elisabeth Angell Bergh	Norway	4:29.82	
6	Rebecca Hammond	United States	4:30.05	
7	Lisbeth Pedersen	Norway	4:30.72	
8	Christina Maria Toogood	Norway	4:33.54	
9	Live Solheimdal	Norway	4:34.27	
10	Heidi Hestmark	Norway	4:35.84	
11	Caroline Ziesler	Norway	4:37.02	
12	Julie Frøslev Mathisen	Norway	4:39.21	
13	Veronica Undseth	Norway	4:41.43	
14	Christina Ellefsen Hopland	Norway	4:41.75	
15	Anniken Amos Ruud	Norway	4:45.04	
—	Ewa Jacniak	Poland	DNF	PM

== See also ==
- 2015 Diamond League
