= Jämtland-Härjedalens Fotbollförbund =

Association football district association in Sweden

- Abbreviation: Jämtland-Härjedalens FF or JHFF
- Formation: 1928
- Purpose: District Football Association
- Headquarters: Idrottens Hus, Klockhuset, Solliden
- Location(s): Box 384 Östersund Jämtland County Sweden
- Chairman: Leif Nilsson
- Website: http://www.jhff.se/

The Jämtland-Härjedalens Fotbollförbund (Jämtland-Härjedalen Football Association) is one of the 24 district organisations of the Swedish Football Association. It administers lower tier football in the historical provinces of Jämtland and Härjedalen.

== Background ==
Jämtland-Härjedalens Fotbollförbund, commonly referred to as Jämtland-Härjedalens FF, is the governing body for football in the historical provinces of Jämtland and Härjedalen, the corresponding area now being covered by Jämtland County. The Association was formed in 1928 and currently has 63 member clubs. Based in Östersund, the Association's Chairman is Leif Nilsson.

== Affiliated Members ==
The following clubs are affiliated to the Jämtland-Härjedalens FF:

- Alsens IF
- Aspås IF
- Bergs IK
- Bispgårdens IF
- BK Björnen
- Bräcke SK
- Brunflo FK
- Duveds IF
- Fåkers IK
- Fältjägarnas IF
- Fåssjö IK
- Fjällsjö BK
- Föllinge IK
- Frösö IF
- Frostvikens FF
- Funäsdalens IF
- Genvalla IF
- Hackås IF
- Häggenås SK
- Häggenås-Lit-Kyrkås FF
- Häljesund-Kvitsle IF
- Hallens SK
- Hammerdals IF
- Hede IK
- Hotings IF
- IFK Kyrktåsjö
- IFK Lit
- IFK Östersund
- IFK Strömsund
- Järpens IF
- Kälarne IK
- Klövsjö IF
- Krokom Dvärsätts IF
- Kyrkås IF
- Lillhärdals IF
- Mårdsjöns IF
- Marieby GOIF
- Mattmar SK
- Mörsils IF
- Myssjö-Ovikens IF
- Näldens IF
- Norra Lits IF
- Offerdals IF
- Ope IF
- Orrvikens IK
- Pilgrimstads IF
- Ragunda BK
- Rätans IF
- Rödöns SK
- Rossöns IF
- Störåsens Bygdegårds och IF
- Stuguns BK
- Sundsjö IF
- Svegs IK
- Tandsbyns FK
- Vemdalens IF
- Vemhåns IK
- Ytterhogdals IK
- Åre Sk
- Ås IF
- Älvros IK
- Östersunds DFF
- Östersunds FK

== League Competitions ==
Jämtland-Härjedalens FF run the following League Competitions:

=== Men's Football ===
Division 4 - one section
Division 5 - two sections

=== Women's Football ===
Division 3 - one section
Division 4 - one section
