= Grenhopp and mellanhopp =

Grenhopp (lit. 'crotch jump') and mellanhopp (lit. 'intermediary jump') were events in early Swedish athletics contested regularly until the 1930s. Both are jumps, in height and length respectively, involving artistic gymnastics apparati.

== Grenhopp ==
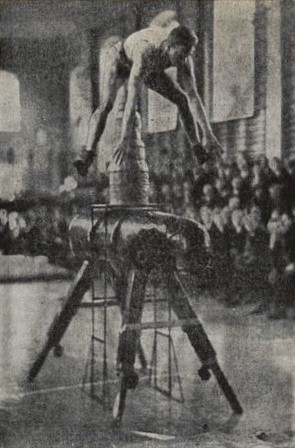
Grenhopp performed by Gösta Larsson

Grenhopp was a gymnastic movement in the works of Pehr Henrik Ling. In the 1880s, it was introduced to the athletics programme in Sweden.

The jumper jumps over the long direction of a pommel horse, with one touch to gain height in the beginning of the horse, and to clears a tower of mumriks – horsehair-stuffed pillows of sailcloth or other hard fabric – placed on it. In competition, for each height, one mumrik is added to the tower. The lower mumriks are fastened to the horse.

The jumper takes off with both feet 1 to 1.5 metres (3 ft 3 in to 4 ft 11 in) from the horse and separates their legs. On approaching the horse, they further take off from the beginning of the horse to pass over the mumriks. For each height, the jumper has three attempts. A valid attempt is when the mumriks remain and the right and left side of the jumper has, according to the judges, been equilateral while passing the mumriks. Furthermore, attempts where the jumper touches the horse without jumping or touches the horse on their way down are considered invalid.

The runway is of free length. The length of the horse is 165–180 centimetres (65–71 in). In the beginning of the horse, where the jumper meets it, it shall be a maximum of 145 centimetres (57 in) tall. The mumriks shall be heavy enough to not be moved by the jumper's first contact with the horse.

Today, grenhopp is a gymnastic movement in the Swedish Gymnastics Federation and SISU materials.

== Mellanhopp ==
Mellanhopp is a jump over a gymnastic apparatus aided by a take off from the apparatus itself. Mellanhopp was mentioned in the 1866 work Tabeller by Hjalmar Ling, but possibly used earlier than that. As a gymnastic movement, it may be performed on any suitable apparatus.

In competition, the mellanhopp is done over a 135 centimetres (53 in) pommel horse. The runway is of free length and the jumper takes off with both feet about 2 metres (6 ft 7 in) from the horse, usually with one toe around one foot length in front of the other. On approaching the horse, they further take off from the beginning of the horse to pass it with feet directly underneath them and land on the other side. The landing is on free ground or on a mat.

The length of a jump is counted from the center line of the horse to the closest point where any part of the body has met the floor. As in long jump, each competitor has a set number of attempts.

Today, mellanhopp is a gymnastic movement in the Swedish Gymnastics Federation and SISU materials.

== Competitions ==
Grenhopp made its championship debut at the inaugural 1896 Swedish Athletics Championships and mellanhopp became a championship event in 1913. From 1913 until 1935, the two events were contested at the Swedish Indoor Jumps Championships together with the standing high jump and standing long jump events. The events where then dropped by the Swedish Athletics Association but taken up by the Swedish Gymnastics Federation, who organised Swedish championships from 1939 to 1948.

For grenhopp, the first noted Swedish record was 2.29 metres (7 ft 6 in) by Theodor Andersson, GAIS, set in 1899. By the end of the Swedish Athletics Association governance, the Swedish record in grenhopp was 2.50 metres (8 ft 2 in) by Leif Dahlgren, IFK Malmö, set in 1931.

The first noted Swedish record in mellanhopp was 3.89 metres (12.8 ft) by Carl Silfverstrand, Djurgårdens IF, set in 1907. By the end of the Swedish Athletics Association governance, the Swedish record was 4.78 metres (15.7 ft) by Wiking Sjöström, IFK Malmö, set in 1934.
