= Fältjägarnas IF =

Swedish football club

- Full name: Fältjägarnas Idrottsförening
- Founded: 1909
- Ground: Jägarvallen; Östersund; Sweden
- Chairman: Henrik Pettersson
- League: Division 4 Jämtland/Härjedalen
Home colours

Fältjägarnas IF is a Swedish football club located in Östersund.

== Background ==
Fältjägarnas IF currently plays in Division 4 Jämtland/Härjedalen which is the sixth tier of Swedish football. They play their home matches at the Jägarvallen in Östersund.

The club is affiliated to Jämtland-Härjedalens Fotbollförbund.

== Season to season ==
Season	Level	Division	Section	Position	Movements
2006*	Tier 7	Division 5	Jämtland/Härjedalen Södra	1st	Promoted
2007	Tier 6	Division 4	Jämtland/Härjedalen	9th	
2008	Tier 6	Division 4	Jämtland/Härjedalen	8th	
2009	Tier 6	Division 4	Jämtland/Härjedalen	7th	
2010	Tier 6	Division 4	Jämtland/Härjedalen	10th	
2011	Tier 6	Division 4	Jämtland/Härjedalen	9th	

* League restructuring in 2006 resulted in a new division being created at Tier 3 and subsequent divisions dropping a level.
