= Kenth Olsson =

Swedish athletics competitor (1945–2025)

Kenth Gunnar Olsson (14 August 1945 – 5 August 2025) was a Swedish athlete and coach.

== Career ==
Olsson competed for IFK Helsingborg during his active career and won a Swedish Championship gold in the 110 metres hurdles in 1976. He also competed in the short hurdles at the 1971 European Championships in Helsinki, where he was eliminated in the trials.

After his active career, he continued as a coach in the club, notably coaching Johan Wissman. He was the coach of Sweden's men's national team from 1995 to 2000.

== Personal life and death ==
Olsson was married to Gun Olsson and together they had a daughter, Karin Olsson Westergren, who became a team manager of Swedish national teams.

Olsson died on 5 August 2025, at the age of 79.
