= IFK Halmstad =

Swedish sports club

- Full name: Idrottsföreningen Kamraterna, Halmstad
- Sport: athletics, earlier also association football and bandy
- Founded: 1895
- Based in: Halmstad, Sweden

IFK Halmstad, Idrottsföreningen Kamraterna, Halmstad, is a sports club in Halmstad, Sweden. The club was founded in 1895 and is now mainly active in athletics (track and field). In the first half of the 20th century, the club also had active departments in the sports of bandy (district champions in Halland in 1947) and association football.
