= Åke Ödmark =

Swedish high jumper

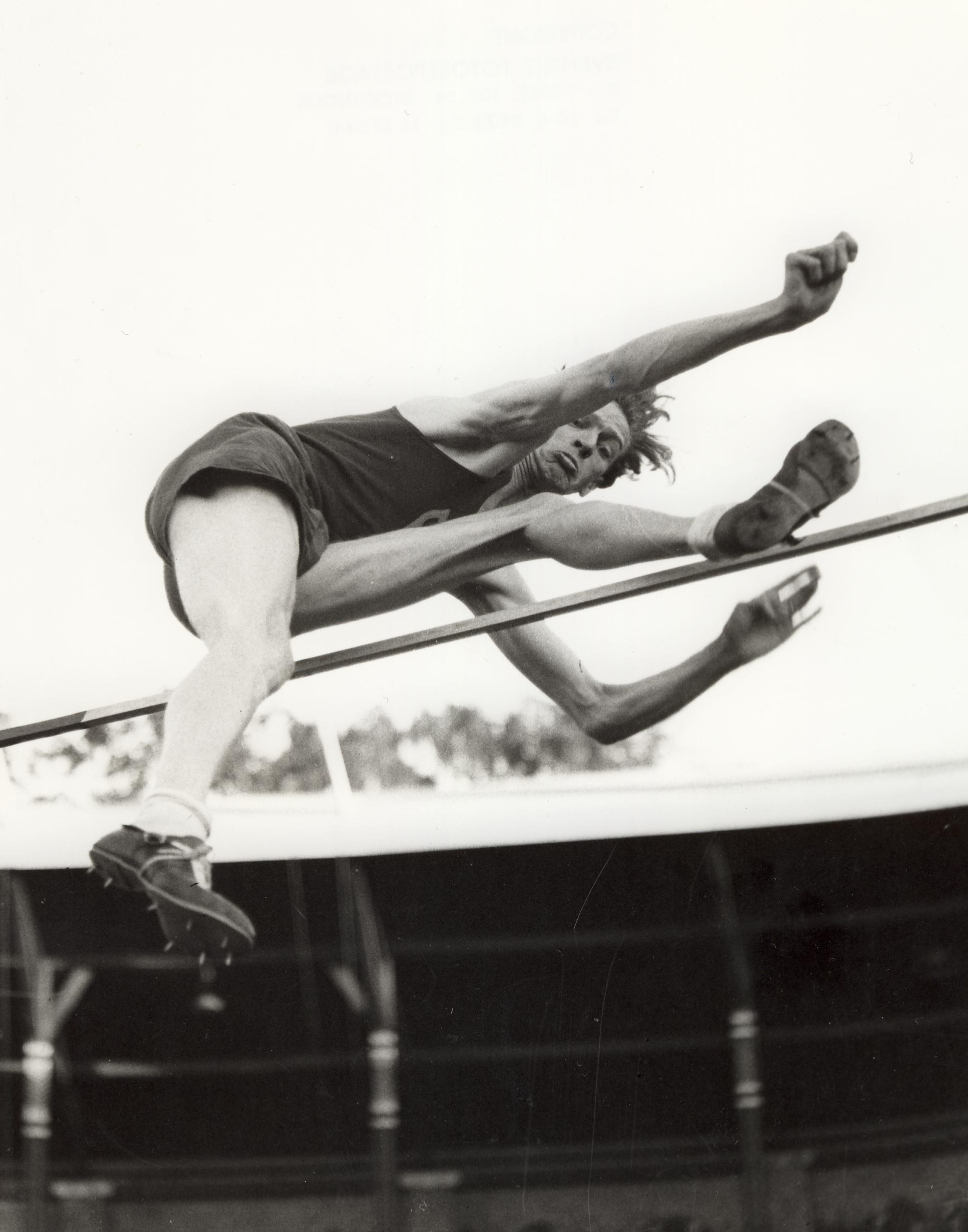
- Ödmark in the 1930s

Personal information
- Born: 29 October 1916 Strömsund, Sweden
- Died: 4 September 1994 (aged 77) Stockholm, Sweden
- Height: 1.89 m (6 ft 2 in)
- Weight: 73 kg (161 lb)

Sport
- Sport: Athletics
- Event: High jump
- Club: IFK Strömsund; UoIF Matteuspojkarna

Achievements and titles
- Personal best: 2.008 (1941)

Åke Ödmark (29 October 1916 – 4 September 1994) was a Swedish high jumper. He finished 12th at the 1936 Summer Olympics and fourth at the 1938 European Athletics Championships. Aged 19 he was the youngest participant from Sweden at the 1936 Games. Ödmark won the Swedish title in 1939 and 1940. In 1941 became the first Swede to clear the 2.00 m height in an official competition.

Ödmark represented IFK Strömsund and UoIF Matteuspojkarna.
