= Anna Larsson =

Anna Larsson or Anna Larson may refer to:

- Anna Larsson (contralto) (born 1966), Swedish contralto
- Anna Larsson (runner) (1922–2003), Swedish runner and skier

== See also ==
- Anna-Lotta Larsson (born 1954), Swedish singer and actress
- Anna Laestadius Larsson (born 1966), Swedish journalist and novelist
- Anna Swenn-Larsson (born 1991), Swedish alpine skier
