= Masters W80 discus world record progression =

Masters W80 discus world record progression is the progression of world record improvements of the discus W80 division of Masters athletics. Records must be set in properly conducted, official competitions under the standing IAAF rules unless modified by World Masters Athletics. The W80 division consists of female athletes who have reached the age of 80 but have not yet reached the age of 85, so exactly from their 80th birthday to the day before their 85th birthday. The W80 division now throws a 0.75 kg implement.

Key

Incomplete information Pending

Distance	Athlete	Nationality	Birthdate	Location	Date
24.18	Rosemary Chrimes	United Kingdom	19.05.1933	Birmingham	26.06.2013
21.34	Rachel Hanssens	Belgium	06.04.1929	Sint Niklaas	30.05.2009
20.65	Marianne Barth	Germany	26.07.1925	Bremersbach	07.10.2006
20.50	Birgit Nyhed	Sweden	30.09.1911	Kristiansand	26.06.1992
