= IF Göta =

Sports club in Karlstad, Sweden

- Full name: Idrottsföreningen Göta
- Sport: bandy
- Founded: 1904
- Based in: Karlstad, Sweden
- Arena: Tingvalla IP

IF Göta is a sports club in Karlstad, Sweden, founded in 1904. In the beginning, the club practised football and athletics. The club used to have a successful team in bandy, becoming Swedish champions six times, but now is only concentrated on athletics. The bandy department was merged with IF Boltic to form BS BolticGöta.

The club is sometimes unofficially called IF Karlstad-Göta to avoid confusion with the Stockholm-based sports club IK Göta.

== History ==
In the first year of bandy league system in Sweden, 1930–31, Göta entered in Division 1 Södra together with Djurgårdens IF, IFK Strängnäs, IFK Uppsala, IK Göta, Linköpings AIK, Nässjö IF, and Örebro SK and finished 1st.

== Honours ==
=== Domestic ===
- Swedish Champions:
  - Winners (3): 1932, 1935, 1937
  - Runners-up (4): 1931, 1933, 1952, 1967
