= Västerås IK (1913–1980) =

Sports club in Västerås, Sweden

- Full name: Västerås idrottsklubb
- Sport: association football, ice hockey
- Founded: 4 January 1913
- Based in: Västerås, Sweden

Västerås IK was a Swedish sports club located in Västerås, and founded on 6 January 1913. From the start, the club was primarily associated with its participation in association football, but it would also participate in other sports, including athletics, bandy, handball, and ice hockey.

In 1980, the club was split up, with each section becoming a fully independent club, including:

- VIK Västerås HK (VIK Västerås Hockey Klubb) – ice hockey, also known as Västerås IK.
- Västerås IK Fotboll – association football.
- Västerås IK Handboll – handball
