= Falu IK Friidrott =

Athletics club in Falun, Sweden

Falu IK Athletics (Falu IK Friidrott) is a part of sport club Falu IK, founded 1901 in Falun, Sweden. At its inception, the club consisted of several teams, including ice hockey and soccer, but today Falu IK includes only skiing and athletics.

Falu IK Athletics holds events with participants from around the country. The biggest annual event is Falu Kuriren Spelen, which takes place in early March. In 2010, the club organized the Swedish Championships.

Notable athletes include Jenny Kallur and Susanna Kallur. Both represented the Swedish national team and competed in the hurdles.

Children age six and up can participate.

Falu IK Athletics arena consists of outdoor and indoor arenas located within the sports area at Lugnet, Falun. The clubhouse is located near a woodland lake. In summer, a trail opens for joggers and in winter, for skiers.
