= IFK Helsingborg =

Sports club in Helsingborg, Sweden

IFK Helsingborg is a sports club in Helsingborg, Sweden, founded in 1896. The club has included several sports, but nowadays the focus is on athletics, skiing, tennis, bowling, figure skating, volleyball and triathlon.

In the 1930s, the football team played in the second tier (now Superettan). At best, they reached second place, just three points behind Landskrona BoIS, who were promoted to the first tier Allsvenskan. In the 1935–36 season, IFK's arch-rivals Helsingborgs IF – only two years before the Swedish champions – were defeated 4–0 in the Helsingborg derby at Olympia. The football uniform was grain blue shirts and blue shorts.
