= IK Mode =

Former sports club in Stockholm, Sweden

- Full name: Idrottsklubben Mode
- Sport: bandy, ice hockey, soccer, track and field athletics
- Based in: Stockholm, Sweden

IK Mode was a sports club in Stockholm, Sweden. The club ran bandy, ice hockey, soccer and track and field athletics. The men's bandy team played in the Swedish top division in 1937. and 1940.

The men's ice hockey team played in the Swedish second division during the 1929-1930 season. The club track and field athletics section was especially successful during the 1930s and 40s. The club won Dagbladsstafetten in 1940 and 1946. Other successful track and field athletes competing for the club were Åke Stenqvist who won Swedish national long jump championship for men in 1936, 1937 and 1938 and Lennart Eliasson who won the same event in 1943.

In 1929, AIK offered to take over the club's track and field athletic.
