= IFK Umeå =

Swedish football club

IFK Umeå Fotboll
- Idrottsföreningen Kamraterna Umeå
- Founded: 1901
- Ground: Vildmannavallen IP; Umeå; Sweden
- Chairman: Karl Benny Brännström; Mikael Englund
- Coach: Jonas Wikström
- League: Division 2 Norrland
- 2019: Division 2 Norrland, 10th
Home colours	Away colours

IFK Umeå (IFK Umeå Fotboll) is a Swedish football club located in Umeå in Västerbotten County.

== Background ==
The initiative for the establishment of IFK Umeå was first taken on 23 February 1897, but died out after circa six month, and instead the club was established on 6 November 1901.

The club has 9 sections covering badminton, bandy, bowling, boxing, football, athletics, orienteering, skiing and weightlifting. There are around 2,000 members.

Since foundation, IFK Umeå has participated mainly in the middle and lower divisions of the Swedish football league system. In 1995 they played one season in Division 2 Norrland which was then the third tier of Swedish football. The club currently plays in Division 3 Mellersta Norrland which is the fifth tier of Swedish football. They play their home matches at the Vildmannavallen IP in Umeå. IFK Umeå has an agreement with Umeå municipality which allows the club to manage the Vildmannavallen. Next to the facility are the club's offices which are centrally located in the town.

IFK Umeå are affiliated to the Västerbottens Fotbollförbund.

== Season to season ==
Season	Level	Division	Section	Position	Movements
1993	Tier 5	Division 4	Västerbotten Södra	1st	Promoted
1994	Tier 4	Division 3	Norra Norrland	1st	Promoted
1995	Tier 3	Division 2	Norrland	11th	Relegated
1996	Tier 4	Division 3	Norra Norrland	9th	Relegation Playoffs – Relegated
1997	Tier 5	Division 4	Västerbotten Södra	2nd	Promotion Playoffs
1998	Tier 5	Division 4	Västerbotten Södra	11th	Relegated
1999	Tier 6	Division 5	Västerbotten Södra	10th	
2000	Tier 6	Division 5	Västerbotten Södra	9th	
2001	Tier 6	Division 5	Västerbotten Södra	3rd	Promoted
2002	Tier 5	Division 4	Västerbotten Södra	11th	
2003	Tier 5	Division 4	Västerbotten Södra	12th	Relegated
2004	Tier 6	Division 5	Västerbotten Södra	2nd	Promoted
2005	Tier 5	Division 4	Västerbotten Södra	11th	
2006*	Tier 6	Division 4	Västerbotten Södra	10th	
2007	Tier 6	Division 4	Västerbotten Södra	4th	
2008	Tier 6	Division 4	Västerbotten Södra	3rd	
2009	Tier 6	Division 4	Västerbotten Södra Vår	1st	
	Tier 6	Division 4	Västerbotten Elitfyran	1st	Promoted
2010	Tier 5	Division 3	Mellersta Norrland	9th	Relegation Playoffs- Not Relegated
2011	Tier 5	Division 3	Mellersta Norrland	4th	
2012	Tier 5	Division 3	Mellersta Norrland	4th	
2013	Tier 5	Division 3	Norra Norrland	4th	
2014	Tier 5	Division 3	Norra Norrland	4th	
2015	Tier 5	Division 3	Mellersta Norrland	4th	
2016	Tier 5	Division 3	Norra Norrland	3rd	
2017	Tier 5	Division 3	Norra Norrland	1st	Promoted
2018	Tier 4	Division 2	Norrland	12th	Relegation Playoffs
2019	Tier 4	Division 2	Norrland	10th	
2020	Tier 4	Division 2	Norrland		

* League restructuring in 2006 resulted in a new division being created at Tier 3 and subsequent divisions dropping a level.

== Attendances ==
In recent seasons IFK Umeå have had the following average attendances:

Season	Average Attendance	Division / Section	Level
2009	Not available	Div 4 Västerbotten Södra	Tier 6
2010	87	Div 3 Mellersta Norrland	Tier 5
2011	113	Div 3 Mellersta Norrland	Tier 5
2012	81	Div 3 Mellersta Norrland	Tier 5
2013	Not available	Div 3 Norra Norrland	Tier 5
2014	76	Div 3 Norra Norrland	Tier 5
2015	83	Div 3 Mellersta Norrland	Tier 5
2016	Not available	Div 3 Norra Norrland	Tier 5
2017	Not available	Div 3 Norra Norrland	Tier 5
2018	Not available	Div 2 Norrland	Tier 4
2019	?	Div 2 Norrland	Tier 4
2020		Div 2 Norrland	Tier 4

* Attendances are provided in the Publikliga sections of the Svenska Fotbollförbundet website.
