= IFK Strömsund =

Swedish football club

- Full name: Idrottsföreningen Kamraterna Strömsund
- Founded: 1908
- Ground: Strömsvallen; Strömsund; Sweden
- Chairman: Carina Wiik
- League: Division 4 Jämtland/Härjedalen
Home colours

IFK Strömsund is a Swedish football club located in Strömsund.

== Background ==
IFK Strömsund currently plays in Division 4 Jämtland/Härjedalen which is the sixth tier of Swedish football. They play their home matches at the Strömsvallen in Strömsund.

The club is affiliated to Jämtland-Härjedalens Fotbollförbund.

== Season to season ==
In their most successful period IFK Strömsund competed in the following divisions:

Season	Level	Division	Section	Position	Movements
1976	Tier 4	Division 4	Jämtland/Härjedalen	1st	Promoted
1977	Tier 3	Division 3	Mellersta Norrland	9th	
1978	Tier 3	Division 3	Mellersta Norrland	12th	Relegated
1979	Tier 4	Division 4	Jämtland/Härjedalen	2nd	
1980	Tier 4	Division 4	Jämtland/Härjedalen	1st	Promoted
1981	Tier 3	Division 3	Mellersta Norrland	9th	
1982	Tier 3	Division 3	Mellersta Norrland	11th	Relegated
1983	Tier 4	Division 4	Jämtland/Härjedalen	1st	Promoted
1984	Tier 3	Division 3	Mellersta Norrland	12th	Relegated
1985	Tier 4	Division 4	Jämtland/Härjedalen	6th	

In recent seasons IFK Strömsund have competed in the following divisions:

Season	Level	Division	Section	Position	Movements
2006*	Tier 7	Division 5	Jämtland/Härjedalen Norra	6th	
2007	Tier 7	Division 5	Jämtland/Härjedalen Norra	5th	
2008	Tier 7	Division 5	Jämtland/Härjedalen Norra	3rd	
2009	Tier 7	Division 5	Jämtland/Härjedalen	1st	Promoted
2010	Tier 6	Division 4	Jämtland/Härjedalen	6th	
2011	Tier 6	Division 4	Jämtland/Härjedalen	6th	

* League restructuring in 2006 resulted in a new division being created at Tier 3 and subsequent divisions dropping a level.
