= Swedish Athletics Association =

Track and field athletics governing body in Sweden

Swedish Athletics Federation
- Svenska Friidrottsförbundet
- Svenska Friidrottsforbundet international logo
- Sport: Athletics
- Abbreviation: SFIF
- Founded: 30 October 1895
- Affiliation: World Athletics
- Regional affiliation: EAA
- Headquarters: Solna, Sweden
- President: Toralf Nilsson
- Secretary: Stefan Olsson

Official website
- www.friidrott.se
- (Sweden)

The Swedish Athletics Association (Swedish: Svenska Friidrottsförbundet) is the governing body for the sport of athletics in Sweden. It was established in Gothenburg on 30 October 1895.

== Affiliations ==
- World Athletics
- European Athletic Association (EAA)
- Swedish Olympic Committee

== National records ==
SFIF maintains the Swedish records in athletics.

== See also ==
- List of athletes awarded Stora grabbars och tjejers märke
