= IFK Växjö =

Sports club in Växjö, Sweden

- Full name: Idrottsföreningen kamraterna Växjö
- Sport: track and field athletics, disabled sports bandy, football (earlier)
- Founded: 2 July 1919
- Based in: Växjö, Sweden
- Stadium: Värendsvallen

IFK Växjö is a sports club in Växjö, Sweden, established on 2 July 1919. The club runs track and field athletics and disabled sports, earlier even bandy and football. The men's bandy team played in the Swedish top division in 1941. The women's football activity was transferred to Östers IF in 1983, leading to the establishments of Östers IF dam.

Track and field athlete Carolina Klüft and singer John Lundvik have competed for the club.
