= 2018 Swedish Athletics Championships =

- Dates: 24–26 August
- Host city: Eskilstuna, Sweden
- Venue: Ekängens Friidrottsarena
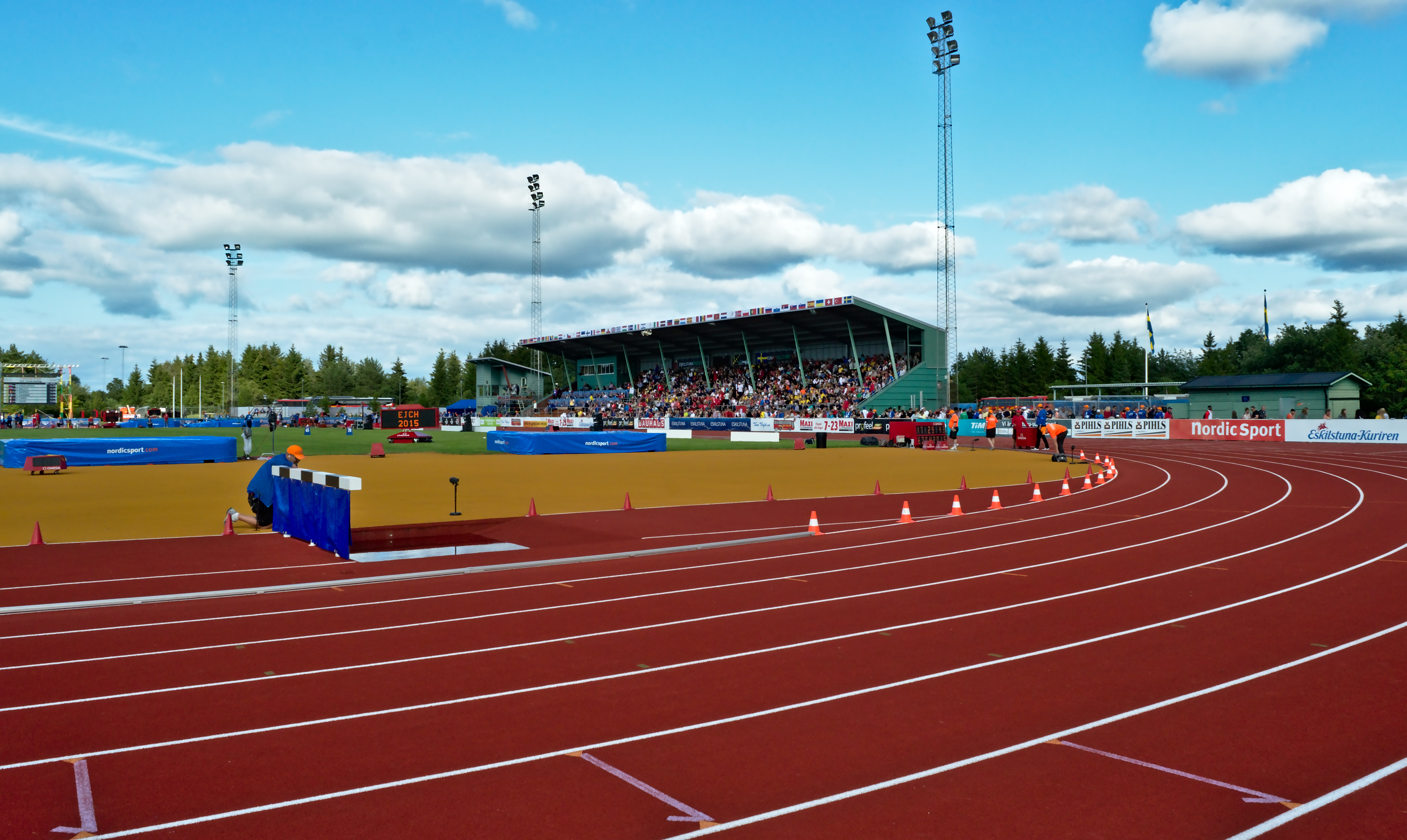

The 2018 Swedish Athletics Championships (Swedish: Svenska mästerskapen i friidrott 2018) was the 123rd national outdoor track and field championships for Sweden. It was held on 24 to 26 August at the Ekängens Friidrottsarena in Eskilstuna. It was organised by Råby-Rekarne FIF, Ärla IF and Eskilstuna FI,

== Championships ==
Swedish outdoor championships took place at several venues beyond the main track and field championships.

Event	Date	Venue	Location	Organiser
Half marathon	19 May		Gothenburg	Göteborgs Friidrottsförbund
Relays	26–27 May	Slottsskogsvallen	Gothenburg	Mölndals AIK, Sävedalens AIK, Ullevi/Utby, Ullevi/Vikingen and Örgryte IS
Marathon	2 June	Stockholm Marathon	Stockholm	Marathongruppen, Hässelby SK and Spårvägens FK
10K run	14 June		Stockholm	Hässelby SK and Spårvägens FK
100K run	5 July		Helsingborg	Runners Society Athletes Club, Helsingborg
Club team	6 July	Hedens idrottsplats	Helsingborg	IFK Helsingborg
Combined events	8–9 September	Rimnersvallen	Uddevalla	IK Orient and Bohuslän-Dals FIF
Cross country	27–28 October	Ekerum	Öland	Högby IF

== Results ==
=== Men ===
Event	Gold		Silver		Bronze	
100 metres	Henrik Larsson; IF Göta Karlstad	10.14	Erik Hagberg; Upsala IF Friidrott	10.15	Dennis Leal; Spårvägens FK	10.20
200 metres	Felix Svensson; Mölndals AIK	20.73	Tom Kling-Baptiste; Huddinge AIS	20.89	Dennis Forsman; Ullevi FK	21.25
400 metres	Erik Martinsson; Gefle IF Friidrott	47.26	Carl Bengtström; Örgryte IS	47.27	Nick Ekelund-Arenander; Malmö AI	47.90
800 metres	Andreas Kramer; Sävedalens AIK	1:47.82	Berhe Kidane; Eskilstuna FI	1:49.94	Elmar Engholm; Hässelby SK	1:50.27
1500 metres	Kalle Berglund; Spårvägens FK	4:00.08	Johan Rogestedt; Stenungsunds FI	4:01.19	Elmar Engholm; Hässelby SK	4:01.58
5000 metres	Kalle Berglund; Spårvägens FK	14:46.03	Suldan Hassan; Ullevi FK	14:46.73	Emil Danielsson; Spårvägens FK	14:46.78
10,000 metres	Adhanom Abraha; Eskilstuna FI	29:35.37	Ebba Tulu Chala; Huddinge AIS	29:38.63	Jonas Leandersson; Enhörna IF	29:43.11
10K run	Napoleon Solomon; Turebergs FK	29:40	Olle Walleräng; Spårvägens FK	29:41	Emil Svensk; Tjalve IF Norrköping	30:27
Half marathon	Mikael Ekvall; Strömstads LK	1:03:52	Ebba Tulu Chala; Huddinge AIS	1:04:07	Adhanom Abraha; Eskilstuna FI	1:04:50
Marathon	Mustafa Mohamed; Hälle IF	2:27:39	Nuray Yassin; Ullevi FK	2:32:19	Erik Anfält; Örebro AIK	2:33:02
100K run	Linus Wirén; Hälle IF	7:09:48	Sebastian Pokorny; Uptown Runners Club	7:38:05	Joacim Martinsson; Växjö LK	7:57:35
4 km cross country	Napoleon Solomon; Turebergs FK	11:54	Robel Fsiha; Spårvägens FK	11:56	Emil Danielsson; Spårvägens FK	12:04
12 km cross country	Napoleon Solomon; Turebergs FK	37:12	Robel Fsiha; Spårvägens FK	37:16	Abraham Adhanom; Eskilstuna FI	37:30
4 km cross country team	Spårvägens FK; Robel Fsiha; Emil Danielsson; Olle Walleräng	36:17	Sävedalens AIK; Oscar Claesson; William Lind; Jonatan Fridolfsson	36:53	Turebergs FK; Napoleon Solomon; Daniel Lundgren; Tim Sundström	37:01
12 km cross country team	Spårvägens FK; Robel Fsiha; Anders Fox; Fredrik Uhrbom	1:55:50	Hässelby SK; Andreas Åhwall; Elmar Engholm; Oscar Carlsson	1:57:16	Eskilstuna FI; Abraham Adhanom; Emil Millán de la Oliva; Adam Hammarberg	1:57:18
110 m hurdles	Fredrick Ekholm; IFK Lidingö	13.78	Max Hrelja; Malmö AI	13.90	Hampus Widlund; IFK Växjö	14.14
400 m hurdles	Isak Andersson; Upsala IF Friidrott	50.99	Hampus Widlund; IFK Växjö	51.07	Alexander Lundskog; Ullevi FK	52.10
3000 m s'chase	Napoleon Solomon; Turebergs FK	8:43.29	Simon Sundström; IFK Lidingö	8:51.23	Efrem Brhane; Västerås FK	8:56.68
4 × 100 m relay	Ullevi FK; Emil von Barth; Sulayman Bah; Alexander Lesser; Patrik R. Andersson	40.48	Hammarby IF team 1 Desmond Rogo; Jean-Christian Zirignon; Douglas Hellbratt; Tony Darkwah	40.54	Örgryte IS; Alexander Andreasson; Jonathan Carbe; Carl Bengtström; Samuel Wiik	41.19
4 × 400 m relay	Örgryte IS; Samuel Wiik; Felix Francois; Jonathan Carbe; Carl Bengtström	3:13.15	Ullevi FK team 1 Martin Astner; Dennis Forsman; Alexander Lesser; Alexander Lundskog	3:13.53	Hässelby SK team 2 Martin Selin; Oskar Greilert; Emil Lyrberg; Joakim karlsson	3:15.06
4 × 800 m relay	Hässelby SK; Anton Persson; Rickard Gunnarsson; Gustav Berlin; Elmar Engholm	7:32.52	Spårvägens FK team 1 Daniel Gleimar; Johan Walldén; Estifanos Faid; Kalle Berglund	7:35.62	Mölndals AIK; Johan Lamm; Miguel Palm; Sebastian Nilsson; Alexander Nilsson	7:46.18
4 × 1500 m relay	Spårvägens FK team 1 Estifanos Faid; Johan Walldén; Emil Danielsson; Kalle Berglund	15:35.15	Hässelby SK; Rickard Gunnarsson; Erik Djurberg; Anton Persson; Elmar Engholm	15:44.42	Ullevi FK; Ali Al-Janabi; Hampus Börjesson; Hussein Ibrahim; Suldan Hassan	15:45.56
High jump	Linus Thörnblad; Malmö AI	2.11 m	Philip Frifelt Lundqvist; Mölndals AIK	2.09 m	Andreas Carlsson; IK Ymer	2.07 m
Pole vault	Melker Svärd Jacobsson; Örgryte IS	5.21 m	Micael Fagö; Kalmar SK	5.06 m	Erik Thorstensson; Spårvägens FK	5.06 m
Long jump	Thobias Nilsson Montler; Malmö AI	8.06 m	Michel Tornéus; Hammarby IF	7.81 m	Andreas Carlsson; IK Ymer	7.65 m
Triple jump	Erik Ehrlin; Hammarby IF	15.60 m	Daniel Lennartsson; Örgryte IS	15.39 m	Moteba Mbumba; Hässelby SK	15.30 m
Shot put	Daniel Ståhl; Spårvägens FK	18.78 m	Wictor Petersson; Malmö AI	18.66 m	Arwid Koskinen; Ullevi FK	17.57 m
Discus throw	Daniel Ståhl; Spårvägens FK	69.72 m	Simon Pettersson; Hässelby SK	63.37 m	Axel Härstedt; Malmö AI	61.34 m
Hammer throw	Mattias Lindberg; Skellefteå AIK	68.20 m	Ryan McCullough; Malmö AI	67.66 m	Oscar Vestlund; IF Göta Karlstad	67.30 m
Javelin throw	Kim Amb; Bålsta IK	77.13 m	Jiannis Smalios; Thorengruppen TFC	76.70 m	Simon Litzell; Hässelby SK	74.47 m
Decathlon	Andreas Gustafsson; Falu IK	7153 pts	Jonathan Carbe; Örgryte IS	6792 pts	Kevin Frankl; Ullevi FK	6718 pts
Team competition	Ullevi FK	82 pts	Spårvägens FK	81 pts	Hässelby SK	64 pts

=== Women ===
Event	Gold		Silver		Bronze	
100 metres	Fanny Runheim; Thorengruppen TFC	11.51 pts	Daniella Busk; Malmö AI	11.53 pts	Claudia Payton; Ullevi FK	11.63 pts
200 metres	Lisa Lilja; Ullevi FK	23.66 pts	Daniella Busk; Malmö AI	23.73 pts	Matilda Hellqvist; Ullevi FK	23.88 pts
400 metres	Moa Hjelmer; Spårvägens FK	53.92 pts	Matilda Hellqvist; Ullevi FK	53.95 pts	Josefin Magnusson; Malmö AI	54.91 pts
800 metres	Hanna Hermansson; Turebergs FK	2:04.41 pts	Yolanda Ngarambe; Turebergs FK	2:05.99 pts	Anna Silvander; IFK Lidingö	2:07.05 pts
1500 metres	Hanna Hermansson; Turebergs FK	4:14.22 pts	Lovisa Lindh; Ullevi FK	4:15.08 pts	Anna Silvander; IFK Lidingö	4:15.53 pts
5000 metres	Linn Nilsson; Hälle IF	16:24.30 pts	Sarah van der Wielen; Hässelby SK	16:26.27 pts	Sara Christiansso; Sävedalens AIK	16:26.48 pts
10,000 metres	Linn Nilsson; Hälle IF	34:33.06 pts	Anastasia Denisova (BLR); Sävedalens AIK	34:35.93 pts	Johanna Eriksson; Motala AIF	34:57.30 pts
10K run	Hanna Lindholm; Huddinge AIS	34:32 pts	Anastasia Denisova (BLR); Sävedalens AIK	35:07 pts	Ida Nilsson; Högby IF	35:09 pts
Half marathon	Isabellah Andersson; Hässelby SK	1:16:11 pts	Johanna Bäcklund; Runacademy IF	1:17:31 pts	Ida-Maria Nicklasson; Hässelby SK	1:18:28 pts
Marathon	Mikaela Larsson; Spårvägens FK	2:40:28 pts	Caroline Almkvist; Hässelby SK	2:44:49 pts	Isabellah Andersson; Hässelby SK	2:44:59 pts
100K run	Frida Södermark; Tjalve IF Norrköping	8:38:25 pts	Lotta Sjöberg; Helsingborgs SOK	9:35:10 pts	Therese Fredriksson; SOK Knallen	9:43:56 pts
4 km cross country	Meraf Bahta; Hälle IF	13:48 pts	Charlotta Fougberg; Ullevi FK	13:49 pts	Lisa Havell; Spårvägens FK	13:52 pts
8 km cross country	Meraf Bahta; Hälle IF	28:02 pts	Charlotta Fougberg; Ullevi FK	28:09 pts	Lisa Havell; Spårvägens FK	28:19 pts
4 km cross country team	Hälle IF; Meraf Bahta; Linn Nilsson; Samrawit Mengsteab	41:49 pts	Spårvägens FK; Lisa Havell; Mikaela Larsson; Cecilia Norrbom	42:42 pts	Ullevi FK; Charlotta Fougberg; Lovisa Lindh; Emma Belforth	43:41 pts
8 km cross country team	Hälle IF; Meraf Bahta; Samrawit Mengsteab; Linn Nilsson	1:25:20 pts	Spårvägens FK; Lisa Havell; Mikaela Larsson; Cecilia Norrbom	1:26:29 pts	Hässelby SK; Sanna Mustonen; Louise Wiker; Lena Eliasson-Lööf	1:30:01 pts
100 m hurdles	Elin Westerlund; Spårvägens FK	13.51 pts	Emma Tuvesson; Hammarby IF	13.61 pts	Amanda Hansson; Hässelby SK	13.68 pts
400 m hurdles	Johanna Holmén Svensson; Ullevi FK	58.74 pts	Lovisa Linde; Täby IS	59.90 pts	Amanda Holmberg; Lidköpings IS	60.04 pts
3000 m s'chase	Charlotta Fougberg; Ullevi FK	9:42.14 pts	Caroline Högardh; Hässelby SK	10:02.56 pts	Emma Dahl; Örgryte IS	10:11.19 pts
4 × 100 m relay	Spårvägens FK team 1 Elin Westerlund; Isabelle Eurenius; Iréne Ekelund; Moa Hjelmer	45.46 pts	Malmö AI; Josefin Magnusson, Pernilla Nilsson; Daniella Busk; Linnea Killander	45.47 pts	Ullevi FK; Claudia Payton; Lisa Lilja; Estelle Montler; Johanna Holmén Svensson	46.66 pts
4 × 400 m relay	Ullevi FK; Åsa Söderlund; Johanna Holmén Svensson, Lisa Lilja; Matilda Hellqvist	3:40.92 pts	Hässelby SK; Sofia Johnsson; Malin Skogström; Lovisa Bivstedt; Lisa Duffy	3:42.14 pts	Täby IS; Linnéa Frobe; Caroline Kihlblom; Greta Graziani; Lovisa Linde	3:44.52 pts
4 × 800 m relay	Sävedalens AIK; Lisa Bergdahl; Sara Christiansson; Olivia Brunbäck; Gaël de Coninck	8:54.26 pts	Täby IS; Emilia Lillemo; Ida Holm; Greta Graziani; Lovisa Linde	8:54.78 pts	Örgryte IS; Sara Holmgren; Nina Persson; Emma Dahl; Frida Kristiansson	9:20.65 pts
3 × 1500 m relay	Sävedalens AIK; Amélie Svensson; Lisa Bergdahl; Sara Christiansson	13:50.10 pts	Örgryte IS team 1 Emma Dahl; Sara Holmgren; Frida Kristiansson	13:54.28 pts	Hässelby SK; Sanna Mustonen; Emma Gustafsson; Linnéa Sennström	14:43.55 pts
High jump	Sofie Skoog; IF Göta Karlstad	1.89 m	Maja Nilsson; Motala AIF	1.87 m	Ebba Jungmark; Mölndals AIK	1.79 m
Pole vault	Angelica Bengtsson; Hässelby SK	4.62 m	Lisa Gunnarsson; Hässelby SK	4.31 m	Hanna Jansson; Ullevi FK	4.09 m
Long jump	Khaddi Sagnia; Ullevi FK	6.71 m	Malin Marmbrandt; Västerås FK	6.33 m	Sandra Törnros; Gefle IF Friidrott	6.29 m
Triple jump	Aina Griksaite; Spårvägens FK	13.29 m	Emelie Nyman Wänseth; Östersunds GIF	13.08 m	Rebecka Abrahamsson; Örgryte IS	13.01 m
Shot put	Fanny Roos; Athletics 24Seven SK	18.08 m	Frida Åkerström; Hässelby SK	16.31 m	Amanda Malmehed; IF Göta Karlstad	15.65 m
Discus throw	Vanessa Kamga; Upsala IF Friidrott	55.60 m	Fanny Roos; Athletics 24Seven SK	55.11 m	Emma Ljungberg; Spårvägens FK	48.91 m
Hammer throw	Grete Ahlberg; Hammarby IF	67.17 m	Ida Storm; Malmö AI	66.74 m	Marinda Petersson; Malmö AI	66.51 m
Javelin throw	Sofi Flink; Västerås FK	58.88 m	Carolin Näslund; IF Göta Karlstad	53.75 PB	Elisabeth Lithell; KFUM Örebro	50.64 m
Heptathlon	Lovisa Östervall; Upsala IF Friidrott	5404 pts	Mari Klaup-McColl; Ullevi FK	5236 pts	Emelie Nyman Wänseth; Östersunds GIF	5230 pts
Team competition	Ullevi FK	78 pts	Spårvägens FK	73 pts	IF Göta	66 pts
