= 2019 Swedish Athletics Championships =

- Dates: 30 August–1 September
- Host city: Karlstad, Sweden
- Venue: Tingvalla IP
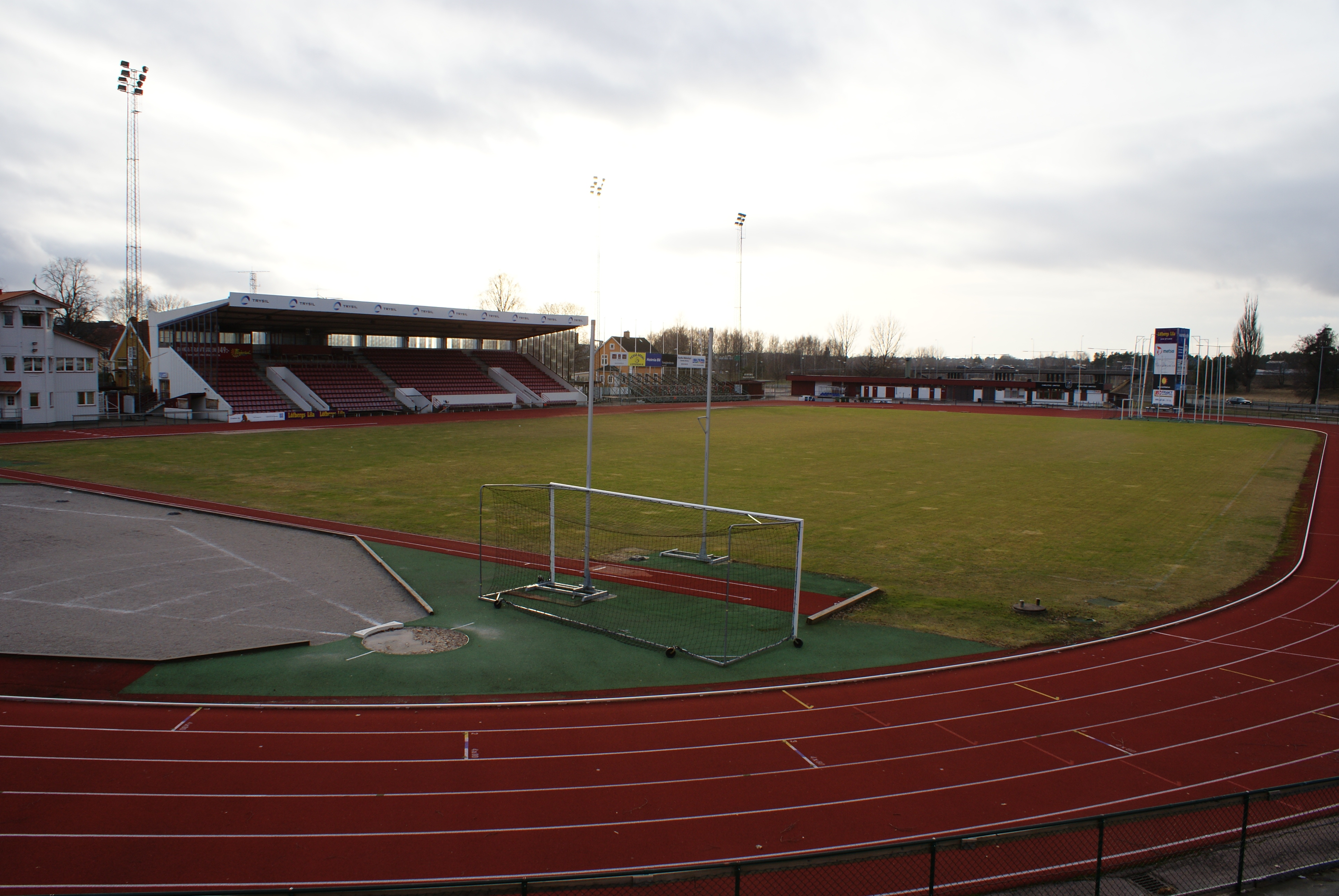

The 2019 Swedish Athletics Championships (Swedish: Svenska mästerskapen i friidrott 2019) was the 124th national outdoor track and field championships for Sweden. It was held from 30 August–1 September at Tingvalla IP in Karlstad. It was organised by IF Göta Karlstad.

== Championships ==
Swedish outdoor championships took place at several venues beyond the main track and field championships.

Event	Date	Venue	Location	Organiser
Half marathon	18 May		Gothenburg	Göteborgs Friidrottsförbund
Relays	25–26 May	Stockholm Olympic Stadium	Stockholm	Stockholmsklubbarna
Marathon	1 June	Stockholm Marathon	Stockholm	Marathongruppen, Hässelby SK and Spårvägens FK
10K run	13 June		Stockholm	Hässelby SK and Spårvägens FK
100K run	6 July		Ljungskile	Hälle IF
Club team	6 July	Malmö Stadion	Malmö	IFK Helsingborg
Combined events	17–18 August	Lugnets IP	Falun	Falu IK
Cross country	12–13 October		Umeå	IFK Umeå

== Results ==
=== Men ===
Event	Gold		Silver		Bronze	
100 metres	Henrik Larsson; IF Göta	10.26	Emmanuel Dawlson; Hammarby IF	10.60	Jean-Christian Zirignon; Malmö AI	10.75
200 metres	Henrik Larsson; IF Göta	20.78	Felix Svensson; Mölndals AIK	20.84	Anders Pihlblad; KFUM Örebro	21.17
400 metres	Nick Ekelund-Arenander; Malmö AI	47.28	Anton Sigurdsson; Malmö AI	47.34	Emil Johansson; Turebergs FK	47.81
800 metres	Andreas Kramer; Sävedalens AIK	1:47.17	Erik Martinsson; Gefle IF Friidrott	1:48.75	Berhe Kidane; Ärla IF	1:48.80
1500 metres	Kalle Berglund; Spårvägens FK	3:40.93	Abubakar Abdullahi; Malmö AI	3:43.63	Emil Danielsson; Spårvägens FK	3:44.21
5000 metres	Suldan Hassan; Ullevi FK	14:02.45	Robel Fsiha; Spårvägens FK	14:05.96	David Nilsson; Högby IF	14:11.26
10,000 metres	Adhanom Abraha; Eskilstuna FI	29:21.23	Robel Fsiha; Spårvägens FK	29:23.17	Emil Millán de la Oliva; Eskilstuna FI	29:27.53
10K run	Robel Fsiha; Spårvägens FK	29:23	David Nilsson; Högby IF	29:31	Olle Walleräng; Spårvägens FK	29:42
Half marathon	Robel Fsiha; Spårvägens FK	1:03:02	Niklas Jonsson; Huddinge AIS	1:06:14	Jonas Leandersson; IF Göta	1:06:54
Marathon	Adhanom Abraha; Eskilstuna FI	2:16:48	Ebba Tulu Chala; Huddinge AIS	2:20:30	Mustafa Mohamed; Hälle IF	2:21:01
100K run	Elov Olsson; Ockelbo SK	6:38:44	Linus Wirén; Hälle IF	6:44:18	Sebastian Pokorny; Uptown Runners Club	7:24:40
4 km cross country	Mohammad Reza; Spårvägens FK	11:44	Emil Millán de la Olivia; Eskilstuna FI	11:45	Daniel Lundgren; Turebergs FK	11:48
10 km cross country	Samuel Tsegay; Hälle IF	30:48	Napoleon Solomon; Turebergs FK	30:55	Mohammad Reza; Spårvägens FK	31:01
4 km cross country team	Spårvägens FK; Mohammad Reza, Emil Danielsson, John Foitzik	15 p	Hässelby SK; Andreas Åhwall, Elmar Engholm, Emil Blomberg	43 p	IFK Umeå Friidrott; Robin Rohlén, Martin Nilsson, Patrik Wikström	56 p
10 km cross country team	Spårvägens FK, team 1 Mohammad Reza, Archie Casteel, John Foitzik	17 p	IFK Umeå Friidrott; Robin Rohlén, Martin Nilsson, Patrik Wikström	41 p	Spårvägens FK, team 2 John Börjesson, Alexander Söderberg, Anders Fox	42 p
110 m hurdles	Max Hrelja; Malmö AI	14.10	Hampus Widlund; IFK Växjö	14.11	Anton Levin; Malmö AI	14.12
400 m hurdles	Carl Bengtström; Örgryte IS	50.38	Hampus Widlund; IFK Växjö	50.70	Isak Andersson; Upsala IF Friidrott	51.17
3000 m s'chase	Simon Sundström; IFK Lidingö	8:46.59	Emil Blomberg; Hässelby SK	8:53.05	Omar Nuur; IFK Växjö	8:53.94
4 × 100 m relay	Malmö AI, team 1 Kasper Kadestål; Austin Hamilton; Thobias Montler; Jean Christian Zirignon	39.62	Malmö AI, team 2 Max Hrelja; Anton Levin; Douglas Hellbratt; Amadou Sussoho	41.06	KFUM Örebro; Jonatan Hirsh; Eric Larsson; Braulio Ribeiro; Anders Pihlblad	41.68
4 × 400 m relay	Malmö AI; Anton Sigurdsson; Simon Martinsson; Douglas Hellbratt; Nick Ekelund-Arenander	3:14.58	Örgryte IS; Jonathan Carbe; Felix Francois; Samuel Wiik; Carl Bengtström	3:14.72	Ullevi FK; Oskar Greilert; Martin Selin; Joakim Karlsson; Adam Danielsson	3:15.24
4 × 800 m relay	Hässelby SK; Anton Axelsson; Anton Persson; Gustav Berlin; Elmar Engholm	7:37.00	Ullevi FK; Hampus Börjesson; Alexander Lundskog; Ali Al-Janabi; Suldan Hassan	7:37.61	Mölndals AIK; Mikael Rosenqvist; Alexander Nilsson; Johan Lamm; Simon Wallenlind	7:46.72
4 × 1500 m relay	Spårvägens FK, team 2 Alexander Holmblad; Johan Walldén; Emil Danielsson; Kalle Berglund	15:31.40	Hässelby SK; Anton Persson; Axel Djurberg; Erik Djurberg; Gustaf Berlin	16:04.80	Spårvägens FK, team 1 John Foitzik; Daniel Gleimar; Gustav Nordling; Anders Fox	16:06.83
High jump	Andreas Carlsson; IK Ymer	2.13 m	Fabian Delryd; Täby IS	2.11 m	Melwin Lycke Holm; Kils AIK	2.09 m
Pole vault	Melker Svärd Jacobsson; Örgryte IS	5.50 m	Oscar Janson; Ullevi FK	5.08 m	Carl Sténson; Hellas FK	5.03 m
Long jump	Thobias Montler; Malmö AI	8.01 m	Andreas Otterling; IFK Lidingö	7.74 m	Andreas Carlsson; IK Ymer	7.74 m
Triple jump	Jesper Hellström; Hässelby SK	15.80 m	Erik Ehrlin; Hammarby IF	15.36 m	Isak Persson; Örgryte IS	15.12 m
Shot put	Wictor Petersson; Malmö AI	20.33 m	Niklas Arrhenius; Spårvägens FK	18.73 m	Jesper Arbinge; Spårvägens FK	18.64 m
Discus throw	Daniel Ståhl; Spårvägens FK	69.23 m	Niklas Arrhenius; Spårvägens FK	61.14 m	Simon Pettersson; Hässelby SK	61.06 m
Hammer throw	Mattias Lindberg; Skellefteå AIK	70.11 m	Ragnar Carlsson; Falu IK	66.21 m	Ryan McCullough; Malmö AI	66.19 m
Javelin throw	Kim Amb; Bålsta IK	86.03 m	Jiannis Smalios; Eskilstuna FI	76.39 m	Sebastian Thörngren; IFK Växjö	74.98 m
Decathlon	Fredrik Samuelsson; Hässelby SK	7873 pts	Andreas Gustafsson; Falu IK	7437 pts	Rasmus Elfgaard; Athletics 24Seven	6676 pts
Team competition	Ullevi FK	75 pts	Hässelby SK	74 pts	Spårvägens FK	70 pts

=== Women ===
Event	Gold		Silver		Bronze	
100 metres	Irene Ekelund; Spårvägens FK	11.51 pts	Daniella Busk; Malmö AI	11.75 pts	Claudia Payton; Ullevi FK	11.78 pts
200 metres	Irene Ekelund; Spårvägens FK	23.56 pts	Moa Hjelmer; Spårvägens FK	23.83 pts	Elin Östlund; KFUM Örebro	23.97 pts
400 metres	Moa Hjelmer; Spårvägens FK	54.15 pts	Sandra Knezevic; Hammarby IF	54.68 pts	Linnea Killander; Malmö AI	55.31 pts
800 metres	Hanna Hermansson; Turebergs FK	2:04.82 pts	Linn Söderholm; Sävedalens AIK	2:10.77 pts	Lovisa Bivstedt; Hässelby SK	2:11.33 pts
1500 metres	Yolanda Ngarambe; Turebergs FK	4:26.23 pts	Hanna Hermansson; Turebergs FK	4:26.65 pts	Sara Christiansson; Sävedalens AIK	4:31.53 pts
5000 metres	Meraf Bahta; Hälle IF	15:56.68 pts	Samrawit Mengsteab; Hälle IF	15:57.68 pts	Sara Christiansson; Sävedalens AIK	15:57.69 pts
10,000 metres	Samrawit Mengsteab; Hälle IF	35:03.93 pts	Cecilia Norrbom; Spårvägens FK	35:05.31 pts	Johanna Eriksson; Motala AIF	35:06.42 pts
10K run	Charlotta Fougberg; Ullevi FK	33:59 pts	Anastasia Denisova; Sävedalens AIK	34:18 pts	Samrawit Mengsteab; Hälle IF	35:03 pts
Half marathon	Charlotta Fougberg; Ullevi FK	1:13:16 pts	Hanna Lindholm; Huddinge AIS	1:14:20 pts	Cecilia Norrbom; Spårvägens FK	1:16:10 pts
Marathon	Mikaela Larsson; Spårvägens FK	2:36:32 pts	Johanna Bäcklund; Runacademy IF	2:39:08 pts	Hanna Lindholm; Huddinge AIS	2:41:31 pts
100K run	Lisa Ring; IK Nocout.se	7:58:11 pts	Krisztina Ruscsák; Mölndals AIK	8:12:15 pts	Therese Fredriksson; SOK Knallen	9:02:25 pts
4 km cross country	Samrawit Mengsteab; Hälle IF	13:45 pts	Sara Christiansson; Sävedalens AIK	13:46 pts	Hanna Bergström; Huddinge AIS	13:57 pts
10 km cross country	Samrawit Mengsteab; Hälle IF	35:30 pts	Moa Lundgren; IFK Umeå Friidrott	35:38 pts	Sara Holmgren; Örgryte IS	36:05 pts
10 km cross country team	Örgryte IS; Sara Holmgren, Johanna Larsson, Hanna Michaelsson	16 p	Hässelby SK; Sanna Mustonen, Gabriella Samuelsson, Kerstin Axelsson	29 p	FK Studenterna; Anna Jonsson, Emilia Todorovska, Malin Gibrand	46 p
100 m hurdles	Emma Tuvesson; Spårvägens FK	13.76 pts	Malin Skogström; Hässelby SK	14.13 pts	Amanda Holmberg; Lidköpings IS	14.18 pts
400 m hurdles	Hanna Palmqvist; Mölndals AIK	58.75 pts	Moa Granat; Vallentuna FK	59.44 pts	Johanna Holmén Svensson; Ullevi FK	60.30 pts
3000 m s'chase	Linn Söderholm; Sävedalens AIK	10:21.94 pts	Julia Samuelsson; Högby IF	10:29.88 pts	Tova Eurén; Göteborgs KIK	10:34.34 pts
4 × 100 m relay	Ullevi FK; Claudia Payton; Denise Eriksson; Matilda Hellqvist; Lisa Lilja	44.87 pts	Spårvägens FK; Gladys Bamane; Isabelle Eurenius; Irene Ekelund; Moa Hjelmer	45.18 pts	Malmö AI; Nikki Anderberg; Daniella Busk; Wilma Rosenquist; Linnea Killander	45.23 pts
4 × 400 m relay	Ullevi FK; Denise Eriksson; Lisa Lilja; Johanna Holmén Svensson; Matilda Hellqvist	3:44.74 pts	Hässelby SK; Malin Skogström; Lisa Duffy; Lovisa Bivstedt; Sofia Johnsson	3:50.72 pts	Upsala IF Friidrott; Ebba Svantesson; Ida Ehroth; Ida Jansson; Klara Helande	3:52.44 pts
4 × 800 m relay	Turebergs FK; Hanna Hermansson; Bianca Salming; Yolanda Ngarambe; Andrea Claeson	8:33.69 pts	Täby IS; Ida Holm; Linn Kaldéren; Greta Graziani; Lovisa Linde	9:06.76 pts	IFK Lidingö; Rebecka Öberg; Vilma Jonsson; Mika Söderström; Charlotte Schönbeck	9:18.92 pts
3 × 1500 m relay	Turebergs FK; Isabella Andersson; Andrea Claeson; Hanna Hermansson	13:25.73 pts	Sävedalens AIK; Linn Söderholm; Sara Christiansson; Lisa Bergdahl	13:35.16 pts	IFK Lidingö; Rebecka Öberg; Mika Söderström; Charlotte Schönbeck	14:23.32 pts
High jump	Erika Kinsey; Trångsvikens IF	1.88 m	Bianca Salming; Turebergs FK	1.84 m	Sofie Skoog; IF Göta	1.82 m
Pole vault	Angelica Bengtsson; Hässelby SK	4.62 m	Michaela Meijer; Örgryte IS	4.32 m	Hanna Jansson; Ullevi FK	4.02 m
Long jump	Kaiza Karlén; IF Göta	6.26 m	Elin Larsson; IFK Halmstad	6.18 m	Erica Jarder; IF Göta	6.16 m
Triple jump	Emelie Nyman Wänseth; Östersunds GIF	13.25 m	Aina Griksaite; Spårvägens FK	13.22 m	Maja Åskag; Råby-Rekarne FIF	13.19 m
Shot put	Fanny Roos; Athletics 24Seven SK	18.57 m	Maria Nilsson; IK Orient	15.47 m	Sara Lennman; Spårvägens FK	15.25 m
Discus throw	Fanny Roos; Athletics 24Seven SK	56.89 m	Caisa-Marie Lindfors; Upsala IF Friidrott	55.98 m	Emma Ljungberg; Spårvägens FK	54.77 m
Hammer throw	Tracey Andersson; Ullevi FK	66.89 m	Grete Ahlberg; Hammarby IF	65.32 m	Ida Storm; Malmö AI	62.89 m
Javelin throw	Ásdís Hjálmsdóttir; Spårvägens FK	57.49 m	Anna Wessman; IFK Växjö	52.99 m	Mari Klaup-McColl; Ullevi FK	52.62 m
Heptathlon	Bianca Salming; Turebergs FK	5610 pts	Amanda Holmberg; Lidköpings IS	5435 pts	Jonna Lindéen; Kalmar SK	4967 pts
Team competition	Spårvägens FK	79 pts	Ullevi FK	72 pts	Hässelby SK	69 pts
