= 2020 Swedish Athletics Championships =

- Edition: 125th
- Dates: 14–16 August
- Host city: Uppsala, Sweden

The 2020 Swedish Athletics Championships (Swedish: Svenska mästerskapen i friidrott 2020) was the 125th national outdoor track and field championships for Sweden. It was held from 14–16 August in Uppsala and organised by Upsala IF.

== Championships ==
Swedish outdoor championships took place at several venues beyond the main track and field championships.

Event	Date	Venue	Location	Organiser
Track and field	14–16 August		Uppsala	Upsala IF
Half marathon	29 July		Anderstorp	Hälle IF and Villstad GIF
Relays	12–13 September	Slottsskogsvallen	Gothenburg	Vallenklubbarna
Marathon	5 September	Stockholm Marathon	Stockholm	Marathongruppen, Hässelby SK and Spårvägens FK
10K run	10 October		Stockholm	Hässelby SK and Spårvägens FK
100K run	—			Cancelled
Club team	6 August	Slottsskogsvallen	Gothenburg	Örgryte IS
Combined events	31 July–2 August		Ljungby	Ljungby FIK
Cross country	24–25 October		Vällingby	Hässelby SK

== Results ==
=== Men ===
Event	Gold		Silver		Bronze	
100 metres	Henrik Larsson; IF Göta	10.37	Tom Kling-Baptiste; Huddinge AIS	10.52	Thomas Jones; IFK Växjö	10.56
200 metres	Felix Svensson; Mölndals AIK	20.80	Tom Kling-Baptiste; Huddinge AIS	20.93	Anders Pihlblad; KFUM Örebro	21.32
400 metres	Nick Ekelund-Arenander; Malmö AI	46.60	Emil Johansson; Turebergs FK	47.51	Kasper Kadestål; Malmö AI	48.08
800 metres	Andreas Kramer; Sävedalens AIK	1:45.53	Felix Francois; Örgryte IS	1:46.96	Erik Martinsson; Gefle IF Friidrott	1:47.58
1500 metres	Johan Rogestedt; F Stenungsunds FI	3:53.99	Andreas Almgren; Turebergs FK	3:54.45	Samuel Pihlström; Hälle IF	3:54.84
5000 metres	Suldan Hassan; Ullevi FK	13:57.27	Emil Danielsson; Spårvägens FK	13:58.33	Emil Millán de la Oliva; Eskilstuna FI	14:01.33
10,000 metres	Emil Millán de la Oliva; Eskilstuna FI	29:49.05	David Nilsson; Högby IF	29:50.75	Samuel Russom; IS Göta	29:59.92
10K run	Samuel Tsegay; Hälle IF	28:31	Samuel Russom; IS Göta	28:38	David Nilsson; Högbo IF	28:49
Half marathon	Samuel Russom; IS Göta	1:03:47	Samuel Tsegay; Hälle IF	1:03:52	Mustafa Mohamed; Hälle IF	1:03:59
Marathon	Samuel Tsegay; Hälle IF	2:14:41	Samuel Russom; IS Göta	2:16:14	Archibald Casteel; Spårvägens FK	2:18:28
4 km cross country	Mohammad Reza; Spårvägens FK	12:00	Emil Millán de la Oliva; Eskilstuna FI	12:02	Emil Danielsson; Spårvägens FK	12:05
10 km cross country	Samuel Tsegay; Hälle IF	30:46	Samuel Russom; IS Göta	30:53	Emil Millán de la Oliva; Eskilstuna FI	31:22
4 km cross country team	Spårvägens FK; Mohammad Reza; Emil Danielsson; Archibald Casteel	23 pts	Hässelby SK; Elmar Engholm; Axel Djurberg; Andreas Jansson	42 pts	Eskilstuna FI; Emil Millán de la Oliva; Adhanom Abraha; Yared Kidane	49 pts
10 km cross country team	Spårvägens FK; Emil Danielsson; Archibald Casteel; Mohammad Reza	31 pts	Hässelby SK; Elmar Engholm; Axel Djurberg; Andreas Jansson	60 pts	Eskilstuna FI; Emil Millán de la Oliva; Adhanom Abraha; Mirza Nalic	63 pts
110 m hurdles	Max Hrelja; Malmö AI	14.00	Anton Levin; Malmö AI	14.48	Fredrick Ekholm; IFK Lidingö	14.49
400 m hurdles	Oskar Edlund; Täby IS	50.15	Carl Bengtström; Örgryte IS	50.42	Johan Claeson; Linköpings GIF	51.56
3000 m s'chase	Simon Sundström; IFK Lidingö	8:48.33	Emil Blomberg; Hässelby SK	8:53.18	Vidar Johansson; Sävedalens AIK	8:55.07
4 × 100 m relay	Ullevi FK; Nils Thornberg; Patrik Andersson; Alexander Lesser; Lucas Bolin	40.45	Malmö AI; Kasper Kadestål; Austin Hamilton; Viktor Bondesson; Jean-Christian Zirignon	40.56	Örgryte IS; Jonatan Hirsh; Alexander Andreasson; Carl Bengtström; Jonathan Carbe	40.59
4 × 400 m relay	Ullevi FK; Martin Selin; Anton Bengtsson; Nils Thornberg; Alexander Lesser	3:14.12	Malmö AI; Viktor Bondesson; Simon Martinsson; Kasper Kadestål; Anton Sigurdsson	3:14.31	Spårvägens FK; Kristian Efremov; Joakim Andersson; Tor Ekström; Ìvar Kristinn Jasonarson	3:16.17
4 × 800 m relay	Spårvägens FK; Bienvenue Musore; Kalle Berglund; Emil Danielsson; Joakim Andersson	7:34.64	Hässelby SK; Emil Blomberg; Gustav Bivstedt; Gustav Berlin; Anton Persson	7:42.85	Mölndals AIK; Jonathan Grahn; Simon Wikell; Victor Wahlgren; Alexander Nilsson	7:58.82
4 × 1500 m relay	Spårvägens FK; Mohammad Reza; John Foitzik; Emil Danielsson; Kalle Berglund	15:27.55	Sävedalens AIK; Erik Jälknäs; Leo Magnusson; Jonatan Fridolfsson; Vidar Johansson	15:40.06	Hässelby SK; Anton Persson; Elmar Engholm; Axel Djurberg; Gustav Berlin	15:43.69
High jump	Melwin Lycke Holm; Kils AIK	2.13 m	Oskar Lundqvist; Upsala IF Friidrott	2.11 m	Emil Uhlin; Falu IK	2.08 m
Pole vault	Armand Duplantis; Upsala IF Friidrott	5.63 m	Melker Svärd Jacobsson; Örgryte IS	5.53 m	Simon Thor; Hässelby SK	5.18 m
Long jump	Thobias Montler; Malmö AI	8.15 m	Andreas Otterling; IFK Lidingö	7.55 m	Erik Johansson; Ullevi FK	7.42 m
Triple jump	Jesper Hellström; Hässelby SK	16.09 m	Isak Persson; Örgryte IS	15.76 m	Erik Ehrlin; Hammarby IF	15.40 m
Shot put	Wictor Petersson; Malmö AI	20.60 m	Viktor Gardenkrans; Upsala IF Friidrott	19.32 m	Jesper Arbinge; Spårvägens FK	18.80 m
Discus throw	Daniel Ståhl; Spårvägens FK	68.74 m	Simon Pettersson; Hässelby SK	64.73 m	Axel Härstedt; Malmö AI	58.77 m
Hammer throw	Ragnar Carlsson; Hässelby SK	70.83 m	Oscar Vestlund; IF Göta Karlstad	69.31 m	Ryan McCullough; Malmö AI	66.01 m
Javelin throw	Kim Amb; Bålsta IK	83.60 m	Jakob Samuelsson; Hässelby SK	71.31 m	Sebastian Thörngren; IFK Växjö	68.93 m
Decathlon	Fredrik Samuelsson; Hässelby SK	7 854 pts	Marcus Nilsson; Högby IF	7 574 pts	Andreas Gustafsson; Upsala IF Friidrott	7 297 pts
Team competition	Örgryte IS	58 pts	Hässelby SK	58 pts	Ullevi FK	57 pts

=== Women ===
Event	Gold		Silver		Bronze	
100 metres	Nikki Anderberg; Malmö AI	11.47	Claudia Payton; Ullevi FK	11.53	Daniella Busk; Malmö AI	11.74
200 metres	Moa Hjelmer; Spårvägens FK	23.47	Lisa Lilja; Ullevi FK	23.53	Daniella Busk; Malmö AI	24.05
400 metres	Moa Hjelmer; Spårvägens FK	53.39	Sandra Knezevic; Hammarby IF	54.08	Klara Helander; Upsala IF Friidrott	54.59
800 metres	Lovisa Lindh; Ullevi FK	2:04.89	Hanna Hermansson; Turebergs FK	2:04.95	Senna Ohlsson; Sävedalens AIK	2:06.05
1500 metres	Hanna Hermansson; Turebergs FK	4:16.07	Sara Christiansson; Sävedalens AIK	4:18.76	Alice Magnell Millán; Eskilstuna FI	4:20.11
5000 metres	Meraf Bahta; Hälle IF	16:27.13	Linn Nilsson; Hälle IF	16:27.50	Sara Christiansson; Sävedalens AIK	16:30.51
10,000 metres	Meraf Bahta; Hälle IF	34:07.21	Sarah Lahti; Hässelby SK	34:07.54	Linn Nilsson; Hälle IF	34:07.99
10K run	Meraf Bahta; Hälle IF	32:02	Carolina Wikström; LK Roslagen	32:02	Hanna Lindholm; Huddinge AIS	32:02
Half marathon	Charlotta Fougberg; Ullevi FK	1:16:51	Linnéa Sennström; Hässelby SK	1:17:07	Charlotte Andersson; IFK Umeå Friidrott	1:17:20
Marathon	Carolina Wikström; LK Roslagen	2:33:59	Mikaela Arfwedson; Spårvägens FK	2:38:28	Louise Wiker; Hässelby SK	2:46:51
4 km cross country	Meraf Bahta; Hälle IF	13:38	Samrawit Mengsteab; Hälle IF	13:54	Anastasia Denisova; Sävedalens AIK	13:55
10 km cross country	Meraf Bahta; Hälle IF	35:00	Sarah Lahti; Hässelby SK	35:05	Anastasia Denisova; Sävedalens AIK	36:28
4 km cross country team	Hälle IF; Meraf Bahta; Samrawit Mengsteab; Lisa Risby	10 pts	Sävedalens AIK; Anastasia Denisova; Sara Christiansson; Lisa Bergdahl	29 pts	Göteborg-Majorna OK; Lina Strand; Moa Enmark; Agnes Leo	47 pts
10 km cross country team	Hälle IF; Meraf Bahta; Samrawit Mengsteab; Lisa Risby	17 pts	Hässelby SK; Sarah Lahti; Sanna Mustonen; Louise Wiker	25 pts	IFK Umeå Friidrott; Charlotte Andersson; Malin Skog; Klara Hofer Mattsson	30 pts
100 m hurdles	Lovisa Karlsson; Högby IF	13.67	Tilde Johansson; Falkenbergs IK	13.80	Julia Wennersten; IK Ymer	13.82
400 m hurdles	Hanna Palmqvist; Mölndals AIK	57.33	Moa Granat; Vallentuna FK	58.06	Amanda Holmberg; Lidköpings IS	58.64
3000 m s'chase	Amélie Svensson; Sävedalens AIK	10:17.75	Emma Dahl; Örgryte IS	10:19.24	Julia Samuelsson; Högby IF	10:26.23
4 × 100 m relay	Malmö AI; Wilma Rosenquist; Nikki Anderberg; Daniella Busk; Linnea Killander	45.05	Ullevi FK; Ide Ileso; Lisa Lilja; Ebba Magnusson; Elin Hallbjörner	46.92	IF Göta; Emilia Kjellberg; Ida Hansen; Erica Jarder; Kaiza Karlén	47.08
4 × 400 m relay	IF Göta; Lovisa Ellström; Hanna Karlsson; Lathifa Afrah; Lova Perman	3:47.79	Malmö AI; Emilia Mandl; Josefin Magnusson; Linnea Killander; Maria Freij	3:52.31	IFK Göteborg; Ivana Pekic; Ida Kühnel Pappila; Agnes Thundal; Elin Pettersson	4:15.66
4 × 800 m relay	Göteborgs KIK; Julia Nielsen; Wilma Nielsen; Sandra Åbergh; Emma Söderström	9:08.27	IF Göta; Lovisa Ellström; Olivia Weslien; Wilma Karlsson; Lova Perman	9:10.34	IFK Göteborg; Alva Thunberg; Nicole Tiourine; Madeleine Björlin-Delmar; Saga Provci	9:10.60
3 × 1500 m relay	Sävedalens AIK; Gaël De Coninck; Lisa Bergdahl; Sara Christiansson	14:01.90	Örgryte IS; Saga Provci; Nicole Tiourine; Madeleine Björlin-Delmar	14:18.85	Göteborgs KIK; Julia Nielsen; Sandra Åberg; Wilma Nielsen	14:25.08
High jump	Erika Kinsey; Trångsvikens IF	1.95 m	Sofie Skoog; IF Göta	1.89 m	Bianca Salming; Turebergs FK	1.87 m
Pole vault	Angelica Bengtsson; Hässelby SK	4.71 m	Lisa Gunnarsson; Hässelby SK	4.46 m	Michaela Meijer; Örgryte IS	4.36 m
Long jump	Khaddi Sagnia; Ullevi FK	6.72 m	Erica Jarder; IF Göta	6.42 m	Tilde Johansson; Falkenbergs IK	6.33 m
Triple jump	Rebecka Abrahamsson; Örgryte IS	13.56 m	Maja Åskag; Råby-Rekarne FIF	13.42 m	Aina Griksaite; Spårvägens FK	13.09 m
Shot put	Fanny Roos; Malmö AI	18.59 m	Frida Åkerström; Hässelby SK	17.10 m	Axelina Johansson; Hässelby SK	65.85 m
Discus throw	Vanessa Kamga; Upsala IF Friidrott	56.11 m	Emma Ljungberg; Spårvägens FK	55.92 m	Fanny Roos; Malmö AI	54.85 m
Hammer throw	Ida Storm; Malmö AI	68.54 m	Tracey Andersson; Ullevi FK	67.75 m	Grete Ahlberg; Hammarby IF	64.13 m
Javelin throw	Ásdís Hjálmsdóttir; Spårvägens FK	57.27 m	Sofi Flink; Västerås FK	55.10 m	Matilda Elfgaard; Athletics 24Seven SK	50.30 m
Heptathlon	Bianca Salming; Turebergs FK	6042 pts	Lovisa Karlsson; Högby IF	5584 pts	Amanda Holmberg; Lidköpings IS	5397 pts
Team competition	Ullevi FK	78 pts	Spårvägens FK	75 pts	Upsala IF Friidrott	63 pts
