= 2023 Bauhausgalan =

- Dates: 2 July 2023
- Host city: Stockholm, Sweden
- Venue: Stockholm Olympic Stadium
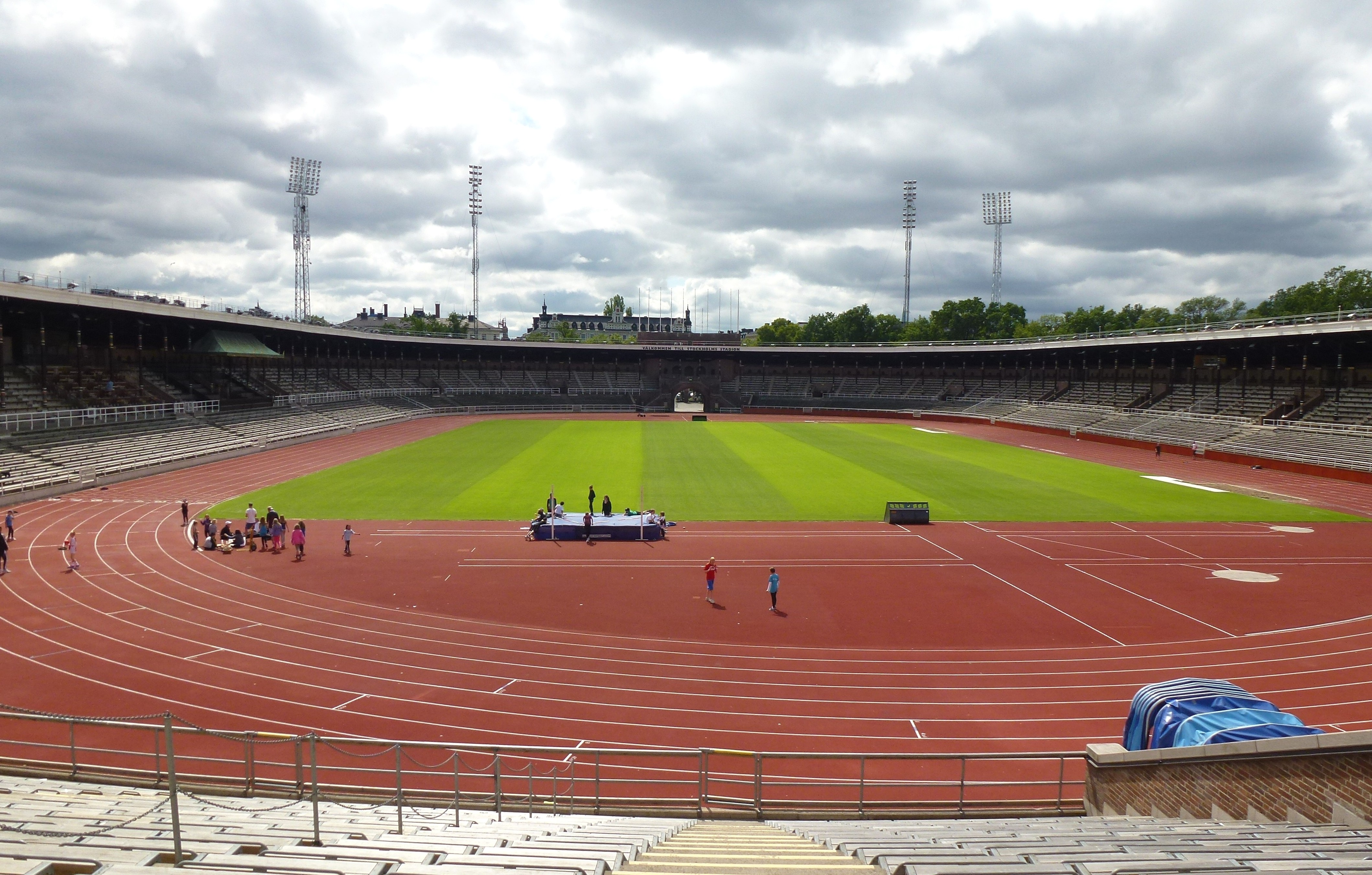
- Level: 2023 Diamond League

The 2023 Bauhausgalan was the 57th edition of the annual outdoor track and field meeting in Stockholm, Sweden. Held on 2 July 2023 at Stockholm Olympic Stadium, it was the seventh leg of the 2023 Diamond League – the highest level international track and field circuit.

The meeting was marred by heavy rain, causing parts of the competition to be delayed. During the 400 metres hurdles, climate movement protestors got onto the track and extended banners blocking lanes one through six, preventing all but the leader Karsten Warholm from finishing unimpeded. The protestors were part of the A22 Network group.

Mondo Duplantis attempted to break his own world record in the pole vault several times, extending the competition hours after the meeting was originally scheduled to end.

== Results ==
Athletes competing in the Diamond League disciplines earned extra compensation and points which went towards qualifying the 2023 Diamond League finals. First place earned eight points, with each step down in place earning one less point than the previous, until no points are awarded in ninth place or lower.

=== Diamond Discipline ===
Men's 100m (+1.0 m/s)
Place	Athlete	Country	Time	Points
1st place, gold medalist(s)	Akani Simbine	South Africa	10.03	8
2nd place, silver medalist(s)	Reece Prescod	Great Britain	10.14	7
3rd place, bronze medalist(s)	Joshua Hartmann	Germany	10.23	6
4	Raphael Bouju	Netherlands	10.24	5
5	Aaron Brown	Canada	10.27	4
6	Abdul Hakim Sani Brown	Japan	10.33	3
7	Henrik Larsson	Sweden	10.46	2
8	Jimmy Vicaut	France	13.34	1

Men's 400m
Place	Athlete	Country	Time	Points
1st place, gold medalist(s)	Zakithi Nene	South Africa	45.30	8
2nd place, silver medalist(s)	Emmanuel Bamidele	Nigeria	45.48	7
3rd place, bronze medalist(s)	Matthew Hudson-Smith	Great Britain	45.57	6
4	João Coelho	Portugal	45.66	5
5	Attila Molnár	Hungary	45.77	4
6	Leungo Scotch	Botswana	45.89	3
7	Bayapo Ndori	Botswana	46.13	2
8	Yuki Joseph Nakajima	Japan	46.21	1

Men's 800m
Place	Athlete	Country	Time	Points
1st place, gold medalist(s)	Djamel Sedjati	Algeria	1:44.59	8
2nd place, silver medalist(s)	Saúl Ordóñez	Spain	1:44.67	7
3rd place, bronze medalist(s)	Gabriel Tual	France	1:44.85	6
4	Andreas Kramer	Sweden	1:45.01	5
5	Yanis Meziane	France	1:45.43	4
6	Tom Dradriga	Uganda	1:47.01	3
7	Joseph Deng	Australia	1:47.54	2
8	Emmanuel Korir	Kenya	1:48.96	1
	Khalid Benmahdi	Algeria	DNF	

Men's 400mH
Place	Athlete	Country	Time	Points
1st place, gold medalist(s)	Karsten Warholm	Norway	47.57	8
2nd place, silver medalist(s)	Kyron McMaster	British Virgin Islands	48.94	7
3rd place, bronze medalist(s)	Rasmus Mägi	Estonia	49.04	6
4	Alessandro Sibilio	Italy	49.11	5
5	Wilfried Happio	France	49.67	4
6	Ludvy Vaillant	France	49.91	3
7	Oskar Edlund	Sweden	50.35	2
8	Yasmani Copello	Turkey	50.59	1

Men's 3000mSC
Place	Athlete	Country	Time	Points
1st place, gold medalist(s)	Soufiane El Bakkali	Morocco	8:09.84	8
2nd place, silver medalist(s)	Getnet Wale	Ethiopia	8:12.27	7
3rd place, bronze medalist(s)	Abrham Sime	Ethiopia	8:16.82	6
4	Geordie Beamish	New Zealand	8:17.63	5
5	Avinash Sable	India	8:21.88	4
6	Mohammed Msaad	Morocco	8:22.47	3
7	Simon Sundström	Sweden	8:24.18	2
8	Hailemariyam Amare	Ethiopia	8:26.21	1
9	Vidar Johansson	Sweden	8:27.10	
10	Samuel Duguna	Ethiopia	8:29.26	
11	Emil Blomberg	Sweden	8:32.92	
12	Fernando Carro	Spain	8:39.74	
	Lawrence Kemboi	Kenya	DNF	
	El Mehdi Aboujanah	Spain	DNF	

Men's High Jump
Place	Athlete	Country	Mark	Points
1st place, gold medalist(s)	Hamish Kerr	New Zealand	2.24 m	8
2nd place, silver medalist(s)	Thomas Carmoy	Belgium	2.20 m	7
3rd place, bronze medalist(s)	Andriy Protsenko	Ukraine	2.16 m	6
4	Brandon Starc	Australia	2.12 m	5
5	Douwe Amels	Netherlands	2.12 m	4
6	Gianmarco Tamberi	Italy	2.12 m	3
7	Melwin Lycke Holm	Sweden	2.08 m	2
	Fabian Delryd	Sweden	NM	
	Woo Sang-hyeok	South Korea	NM	

Men's Pole Vault
Place	Athlete	Country	Mark	Points
1st place, gold medalist(s)	Armand Duplantis	Sweden	6.05 m	8
2nd place, silver medalist(s)	EJ Obiena	Philippines	5.82 m	7
3rd place, bronze medalist(s)	Pål Haugen Lillefosse	Norway	5.72 m	6
4	Ben Broeders	Belgium	5.72 m	5
5	Kurtis Marschall	Australia	5.62 m	4
6	Thiago Braz	Brazil	5.62 m	3
7	Sondre Guttormsen	Norway	5.42 m	2
	Renaud Lavillenie	France	NM	

Men's Discus Throw
Place	Athlete	Country	Mark	Points
1st place, gold medalist(s)	Kristjan Čeh	Slovenia	69.83 m	8
2nd place, silver medalist(s)	Daniel Ståhl	Sweden	67.57 m	7
3rd place, bronze medalist(s)	Andrius Gudžius	Lithuania	67.19 m	6
4	Mykolas Alekna	Lithuania	66.91 m	5
5	Matthew Denny	Australia	66.07 m	4
6	Alex Rose	Samoa	65.38 m	3
7	Lawrence Okoye	Great Britain	65.24 m	2
	Simon Pettersson	Sweden	NM	

Women's 200m (−0.6 m/s)
Place	Athlete	Country	Time	Points
1st place, gold medalist(s)	Daryll Neita	Great Britain	22.50	8
2nd place, silver medalist(s)	Dina Asher-Smith	Great Britain	22.58	7
3rd place, bronze medalist(s)	Jaël Bestué	Spain	22.59	6
4	Marie-Josée Ta Lou	Ivory Coast	22.70	5
5	Maboundou Koné	Ivory Coast	22.99	4
6	Tasa Jiya	Netherlands	23.15	3
7	Julia Henriksson	Sweden	23.37	2
8	Boglárka Takács	Hungary	23.62	1

Women's 1500m
Place	Athlete	Country	Time	Points
1st place, gold medalist(s)	Freweyni Hailu	Ethiopia	4:02.31	8
2nd place, silver medalist(s)	Diribe Welteji	Ethiopia	4:02.79	7
3rd place, bronze medalist(s)	Hirut Meshesha	Ethiopia	4:03.01	6
4	Ciara Mageean	Ireland	4:03.46	5
5	Melissa Courtney-Bryant	Great Britain	4:03.81	4
6	Laura Muir	Great Britain	4:03.83	3
7	Birke Haylom	Ethiopia	4:05.21	2
8	Katie Snowden	Great Britain	4:05.28	1
9	Georgia Griffith	Australia	4:09.01	
10	Esther Guerrero	Spain	4:09.21	
11	Linden Hall	Australia	4:09.39	
12	Hanna Hermansson	Sweden	4:11.53	
	Charlotte Mouchet	France	DNF	
	Aneta Lemiesz	Poland	DNF	

Women's 5000m
Place	Athlete	Country	Time	Points
1st place, gold medalist(s)	Beatrice Chebet	Kenya	14:36.52	8
2nd place, silver medalist(s)	Lemlem Hailu	Ethiopia	14:38.06	7
3rd place, bronze medalist(s)	Medina Eisa	Ethiopia	14:40.02	6
4	Sarah Chelangat	Uganda	14:40.88	5
5	Jessica Hull	Australia	14:44.24	4
6	Tsigie Gebreselama	Ethiopia	14:44.94	3
7	Melknat Wudu	Ethiopia	14:47.48	2
8	Axumawit Embaye	Ethiopia	15:04.41	1
9	Jessica Warner-Judd	Great Britain	15:06.59	
10	Sarah Lahti	Sweden	15:06.80	
11	Maureen Koster	Netherlands	15:07.11	
12	Tsiyon Abebe	Ethiopia	15:07.45	
13	Abersh Minsewo	Ethiopia	15:10.13	
14	Konstanze Klosterhalfen	Germany	15:13.06	
	Zeineba Yimer	Ethiopia	DNF	
	Karoline Bjerkeli Grøvdal	Norway	DNF	
	Aleksandra Płocińska	Poland	DNF	

Women's 100mH (+0.9 m/s)
Place	Athlete	Country	Time	Points
1st place, gold medalist(s)	Tobi Amusan	Nigeria	12.52	8
2nd place, silver medalist(s)	Sarah Lavin	Ireland	12.73	7
3rd place, bronze medalist(s)	Pia Skrzyszowska	Poland	12.78	6
4	Devynne Charlton	Bahamas	12.85	5
5	Nadine Visser	Netherlands	12.97	4
6	Reetta Hurske	Finland	12.98	3
7	Michelle Jenneke	Australia	13.01	2
8	Laëticia Bapté	France	13.09	1

Women's Long Jump
Place	Athlete	Country	Mark	Points
1st place, gold medalist(s)	Larissa Iapichino	Italy	6.69 m (+0.4 m/s)	8
2nd place, silver medalist(s)	Malaika Mihambo	Germany	6.66 m (+0.2 m/s)	7
3rd place, bronze medalist(s)	Ivana Španović	Serbia	6.58 m (+1.1 m/s)	6
4	Maryna Bekh-Romanchuk	Ukraine	6.55 m (+1.1 m/s)	5
5	Ese Brume	Nigeria	6.51 m (−0.5 m/s)	4
6	Brooke Buschkuehl	Australia	6.40 m (+0.5 m/s)	3
7	Tilde Johansson	Sweden	6.36 m (+0.3 m/s)	2
8	Jazmin Sawyers	Great Britain	6.25 m (+0.4 m/s)	1

Women's Discus Throw
Place	Athlete	Country	Mark	Points
1st place, gold medalist(s)	Sandra Perković	Croatia	64.49 m	8
2nd place, silver medalist(s)	Jorinde van Klinken	Netherlands	62.96 m	7
3rd place, bronze medalist(s)	Kristin Pudenz	Germany	62.33 m	6
4	Claudine Vita	Germany	61.51 m	5
5	Shanice Craft	Germany	61.01 m	4
6	Mélina Robert-Michon	France	58.25 m	3
7	Emma Ljungberg	Sweden	55.86 m	2
8	Caisa-Marie Lindfors	Sweden	54.12 m	1
9	Emma Sralla	Sweden	38.81 m	
	Valarie Allman	United States	NM	

=== Promotional events ===
Women's Shot Put
Place	Athlete	Country	Mark
1st place, gold medalist(s)	Danniel Thomas-Dodd	Jamaica	19.04 m
2nd place, silver medalist(s)	Jessica Schilder	Netherlands	19.03 m
3rd place, bronze medalist(s)	Fanny Roos	Sweden	18.75 m
4	Jorinde van Klinken	Netherlands	18.24 m
5	Yemisi Ogunleye	Germany	17.94 m
6	Julia Ritter	Germany	17.92 m
7	Sara Lennman	Sweden	16.79 m
8	Anita Márton	Hungary	16.38 m

=== National events ===
Men's 100m (−0.1 m/s)
Place	Athlete	Country	Time
1st place, gold medalist(s)	Joshua Hartmann	Germany	10.23
2nd place, silver medalist(s)	Benjamin Richardson	South Africa	10.24
3rd place, bronze medalist(s)	Jerome Blake	Canada	10.30
4	Desmond Rogo	Sweden	10.55
5	Isak Hughes	Sweden	10.57
6	Simon Plesse	Sweden	10.67
7	Viktor Thor	Sweden	10.71
8	Milo Wahlgren	Sweden	10.81

Men's 400m
Place	Athlete	Country	Time
1st place, gold medalist(s)	Emil Johansson	Sweden	46.69
2nd place, silver medalist(s)	Gardeo Isaacs	South Africa	47.09
3rd place, bronze medalist(s)	David Thid	Sweden	47.75
4	Gustav Gahne	Sweden	48.12
5	Mattias Waernulf	Sweden	48.23
6	Alexander Nyström	Sweden	48.44
7	Rabah Yousif	Great Britain	48.89

Men's 800m
Place	Athlete	Country	Time
1st place, gold medalist(s)	Samuel Pihlström	Sweden	1:48.62
2nd place, silver medalist(s)	Patryk Sieradzki	Poland	1:49.49
3rd place, bronze medalist(s)	Pablo Sánchez-Valladares	Spain	1:49.65
4	Alexander Lundskog	Sweden	1:49.82
5	Viktor Idhammar	Sweden	1:50.65
6	Oussama Nabil	Morocco	1:51.05
7	Yared Kidane	Eritrea	1:53.54
8	Benjamin Åberg	Sweden	1:54.31
9	Habtom Asgede	Eritrea	1:57.24
	Erik Martinsson	Sweden	DNF
	Daniel Rowden	Great Britain	DNF

Women's 100mH (+0.6 m/s)
Place	Athlete	Country	Time
1st place, gold medalist(s)	Sarah Lavin	Ireland	12.89
2nd place, silver medalist(s)	Taylon Bieldt	South Africa	12.92
3rd place, bronze medalist(s)	Ebony Morrison	Liberia	13.39
4	Elin Lindeblad	Sweden	13.75
5	Johanna Carlsson	Sweden	13.91
6	Jonna Lindeén	Sweden	13.95
7	Alva von Gerber	Sweden	13.98
8	Maria Södergren	Sweden	14.35

Women's 400mH
Place	Athlete	Country	Time
1st place, gold medalist(s)	Carolina Krafzik	Germany	55.71
2nd place, silver medalist(s)	Moa Granat	Sweden	57.34
3rd place, bronze medalist(s)	Agata Zupin	Slovenia	58.18
4	Julia Korzuch	Poland	58.94
5	Hanna Karlsson	Sweden	1:00.37
6	Ebba Svantesson	Sweden	1:01.38
7	Tyra Landin	Sweden	1:01.90
8	Maja Sund	Sweden	1:03.29

Women's 4 × 100 m
Place	Athlete	Country	Time
1st place, gold medalist(s)	Lorène Bazolo; Arialis Gandulla; Íris Silva; Rita Santos	Portugal	45.25
	Wilma Svenson; Nora Lindahl; Julia Henriksson; Filippa Sivnert	Sweden	DNF

=== Additional events ===
Men's 3000m
Place	Athlete	Country	Time
1st place, gold medalist(s)	Emil Danielsson	Sweden	7:39.70
2nd place, silver medalist(s)	Andreas Almgren	Sweden	7:40.01
3rd place, bronze medalist(s)	Jimmy Gressier	France	7:40.21
4	Egide Ntakarutimana	Burundi	7:40.52
5	Luis Grijalva	Guatemala	7:40.90
6	Abdisa Fayisa	Ethiopia	7:42.25
7	Sam Parsons	Germany	7:42.58
8	Kieran Lumb	Canada	7:43.81
9	Jack Rayner	Australia	7:54.79
10	Eduardo Herrera	United States	7:56.14
	Jonathan Grahn	Sweden	DNF
	Adam Czerwiński	Poland	DNF
	Paul Robinson	Ireland	DNF

Women's 800m
Place	Athlete	Country	Time
1st place, gold medalist(s)	Worknesh Mesele	Ethiopia	2:00.05
2nd place, silver medalist(s)	Eveliina Määttänen	Finland	2:01.50
3rd place, bronze medalist(s)	Nataliya Krol	Ukraine	2:01.56
4	Revée Walcott-Nolan	Great Britain	2:01.87
5	Annemarie Nissen	Denmark	2:01.93
6	Maria Freij	Sweden	2:05.24
7	Yolanda Ngarambe	Sweden	2:06.14
8	Julia Nielsen	Sweden	2:06.30
9	Nadja Rugland	Sweden	2:10.20
10	Josefin Victoria Heier	Norway	2:11.19
	Agata Kołakowska	Poland	DNF

== See also ==
- 2023 Diamond League
