= Caisa-Marie Lindfors =

Swedish discus thrower (born 2000)

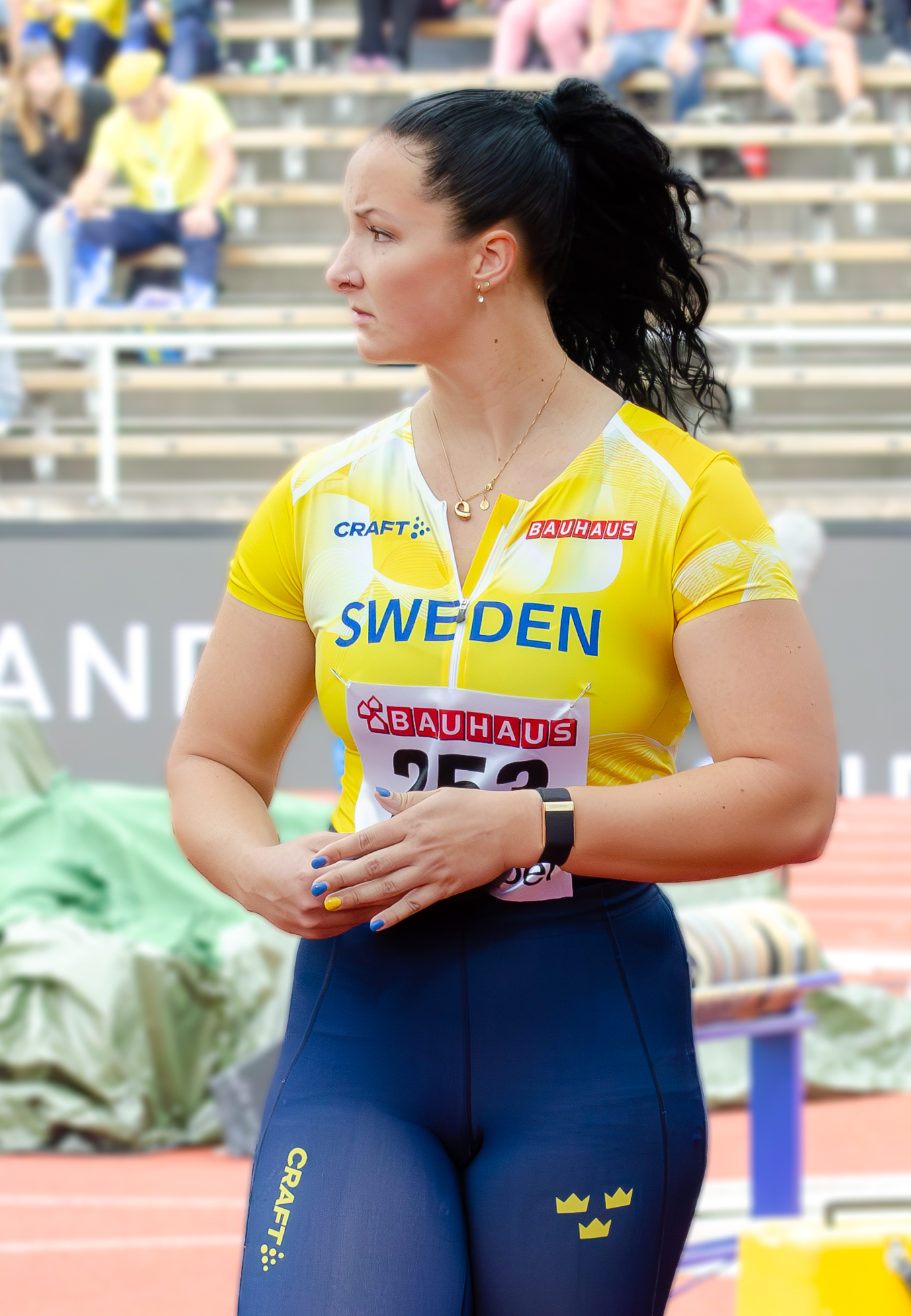
- Lindfors in 2023

Personal information
- Nationality: Sweden
- Born: 5 August 2000 (age 26)
- Home town: Uppsala, Sweden
- Education: Celsiusskolan; Florida State University; University of California, Berkeley

Sport
- Sport: Athletics
- Events: Discus throw Shot put
- College team: Florida State Seminoles; California Golden Bears
- Club: Upsala IF

Achievements and titles
- National finals: 2015 Swedish Indoor U16s; • Shot put, 6th; • Weight throw, 9th; 2015 Swedish U16s; • Hammer throw, 11th; • Discus throw, 4th; • Shot put, 7th; 2016 Swedish Indoor U17s; • Shot put, 4th; • Weight throw, 5th; 2016 Swedish U17s; • Hammer throw, 3rd (bronze); • Discus throw, 2nd (silver); • Shot put, 5th; 2016 Swedish Champs; • Discus throw, 9th; 2017 Swedish Indoor U18s; • Shot put, 3rd (bronze); • Weight throw, 3rd (bronze); 2017 Swedish Indoors; • Weight throw, 13th; 2017 Swedish U18s; • Discus throw, 2nd (silver); • Shot put, 4th; • Hammer throw, 9th; 2018 Swedish Indoors; • Shot put, 8th; 2018 Swedish Indoor U20s; • Shot put, 2nd (silver); • Weight throw, 1st (gold); 2018 Swedish U20s; • Hammer throw, 12th; • Discus throw, 1st (gold); • Shot put, 3rd (bronze); 2018 Swedish Champs; • Discus throw, 4th; 2019 Swedish Indoors; • Weight throw, 7th; • Shot put, 6th; 2019 Swedish U20s; • Discus throw, 1st (gold); • Shot put, 2nd (silver); 2019 Swedish Champs; • Discus throw, 2nd (silver); • Shot put, 7th; 2020 Swedish Indoors; • Shot put, 4th; 2020 Swedish Indoor U23s; • Shot put, 2nd (silver); 2020 Swedish Champs; • Shot put, 5th; • Discus throw, 4th; 2020 Swedish U23s; • Shot put, 2nd (silver); • Discus throw, 2nd (silver); 2021 NCAAs; • Discus throw, 18th; 2021 Swedish U23s; • Shot put, 1st (gold); • Discus throw, 1st (gold); 2021 Swedish Champs; • Discus throw, 1st (gold); 2023 NCAAs; • Discus throw, 4th; 2023 Swedish Champs; • Discus throw, 1st (gold)
- Personal bests: Discus throw: 60.90 m (2023) Shot put: 16.51 m (2023)
Medal record
World University Games
| Silver medal – second place | 2025 Bochum | Discus throw |
- Updated on 4 August 2025

Caisa-Marie Lindfors (born 5 August 2000) is a Swedish discus thrower. She is a multiple-time Swedish Athletics Championships winner and has represented Sweden at the 2023 World Athletics Championships.

== Career ==
Lindfors started competing in throws as early as 2014, and she finished 4th at the 2015 Swedish U16 Championships in the discus. After improving that to 2nd at the 2016 U17 Championships, she achieved her first national win at the U18 Team Championships with a 37.85 m throw representing Upsala IF.

Lindfors' first international win came at the 2017 U18 Finnkampen, throwing a 47.32 m personal best for the victory. The following year she improved that best to 51.26 m at the Bottnarydskastet, qualifying her for the 2018 World U20 Championships. In the qualification, Lindfors placed 18th overall and did not advance to the finals. She nonetheless returned to win Swedish U20 championships and the U20 Nordic Athletics Championships later that year.

Lindford competed at the 2019 European Athletics U20 Championships in both the shot put and discus throw, though she only made the finals in the discus where she placed 4th overall. She first set the Swedish U20 record in the discus at the 2019 Nordic Match, and she improved that record again to 55.98 m finishing second at the 2019 Swedish Athletics Championships.

From 2021 to 2023, Lindfors moved to the United States and competed on the Florida State Seminoles track and field team in the NCAA. She quickly qualified for the 2021 NCAA Division I Outdoor Track and Field Championships, placing 18th overall. After her freshman outdoor season, she finished 4th at the European U23 Championships in the discus throw, again just missing out on a medal.

In 2023, Lindfors finished 4th at the NCAA Division I Outdoor Track and Field Championships, the best finish of her collegiate career. She won the Swedish Athletics Championships national discus title in a 60.90 m personal best, qualifying her for the 2023 World Athletics Championships. At the championships, she finished 32nd in qualification and did not make the finals. Beginning in 2024, Lindfords transferred to the California Golden Bears track and field program.

== Personal life ==
Lindfors is from Uppsala, Sweden where she attended Celsiusskolan high school. She is a member of the Upsala IF athletics club.

== Statistics ==
=== Personal best progression ===
Discus Throw progression
| # | Mark | Pl. | Competition | Venue | Date | Ref. |
|---|---|---|---|---|---|---|
| 1 | 35.60 m | 4th | Lag-SM Kval Grupp A | Eskilstuna, Sweden | 22 May 2015 | |
| 2 | 40.97 m | 6th | Västerås | Västerås, Sweden | 29 Jul 2016 | |
| 3 | 43.14 m | 3rd place, bronze medalist(s) | Uppsala Kastet 1 | Uppsala, Sweden | 29 Apr 2017 | |
| 4 | 43.46 m | 1st place, gold medalist(s) | Hellaskastet | Sätra, Sweden | 5 May 2017 | |
| 5 | 46.74 m | 4th | Kringelspelen | Södertälje, Sweden | 5 Jun 2017 | |
| 6 | 47.32 m | 1st place, gold medalist(s) | Finnkampen | Stockholm, Sweden | 1 Sep 2017 | |
| 7 | 49.68 m | 1st place, gold medalist(s) | | Enköping, Sweden | 9 May 2018 | |
| 8 | 49.88 m | 1st place, gold medalist(s) | Spikkestad Open | Spikkestad, Norway | 19 May 2018 | |
| 9 | 50.29 m | 4th | Hallesche Werfertage, Sportzentrum Brandberge | Halle, Germany | 25 May 2018 | |
| 10 | 51.26 m | 4th | Bottnarydskastet | Bottnaryd, Sweden | 15 Jun 2018 | |
| 11 | 52.68 m | 3rd place, bronze medalist(s) | PURE Athletics/NTC Spring Invitational | Clermont, FL | 19 Apr 2019 | |
| 12 | 52.85 m | 1st place, gold medalist(s) | Kasttävling fredag | Växjö, Sweden | 9 May 2019 | |
| 13 | 53.86 m | 5th | Bottnarydskastet | Bottnaryd, Sweden | 28 Jun 2019 | |
| 14 | 55.46 m | 1st place, gold medalist(s) | Nordic Match U20 | Kristiansand, Norway | 16 Aug 2019 | |
| 15 | 55.98 m | 2nd place, silver medalist(s) | Swedish Athletics Championships | Karlstad, Sweden | 30 Aug 2019 | |
| 16 | 58.66 m | (silver) (Qualification) | NCAA Preliminary East Round | Jacksonville, FL | 28 May 2021 | |
| 17 | 58.80 m | 1st place, gold medalist(s) | Kvällstävling | Uppsala, Sweden | 23 Aug 2021 | |
| 18 | 59.81 m | 1st place, gold medalist(s) | UF Tom Jones Memorial | Gainesville, FL | 14 Apr 2023 | |
| 19 | 60.80 m | 1st place, gold medalist(s) | ACC Outdoor Track & Field Championships | Raleigh, NC | 12 May 2023 | |
| 20 | 60.90 m | 1st place, gold medalist(s) | Swedish Athletics Championships | Söderhamn, Sweden | 29 Jul 2023 | |

Shot Put progression
| # | Mark | Pl. | Competition | Venue | Date | Ref. |
|---|---|---|---|---|---|---|
| 1 | 10.21 m | (bronze) (Castorama) | Uppsala | Uppsala, Sweden | 18 Sep 2015 | |
| 2 | 11.21 m | 2nd place, silver medalist(s) | | Uppsala, Sweden | 8 Jul 2016 | |
| 3 | 11.77 m | (gold) (Castorama) | Uppsala | Uppsala, Sweden | 15 Sep 2017 | |
| 4 | 13.04 m | 3rd place, bronze medalist(s) | JSM-USM17 | Huddinge, Sweden | 4 Aug 2018 | |
| 5 | 14.61 m | 1st place, gold medalist(s) | Mondo Indoor Games | Uppsala, Sweden | 6 Feb 2020 | |
| 6 | 15.46 m | 3rd place, bronze medalist(s) | Kringelkastet | Södertälje, Sweden | 13 Jun 2020 | |
| 7 | 16.41 m | 3rd place, bronze medalist(s) | ACC Indoor Track & Field Championships | Clemson, SC | 26 Feb 2021 | |
| 8 | 16.51 m | 6th | Don Kirby Elite Invitational | Albuquerque, NM | 10 Feb 2023 | |
