= Spårvägens GoIF =

Sports club in Stockholm, Sweden

- Founded: 1919; 107 years ago
- Type: Sports club
- Location: Stockholm
- Region served: Sweden

Spårvägens GoIF, Stockholms Spårvägars Gymnastik och Idrottsförening, was founded in 1919 by employees of Stockholms Spårvägar under the name Stockholms Spårvägspersonals GoIF. Today the club has 15 departments of sports and a total of 5,500 members. Once it competed in 18 sports.

In 1946, swimming was added to the programme and in 1969 football was added to the programme.

== Sections ==
- Athletics - Spårvägens FK
- Badminton - Spårvägen Badminton
- Bandy - Spårvägen Bandy
- Bowling - Spårvägen Bowling
- Cycling - Spårvägens CK
- Football (soccer) - Spårvägens FF
- Handball - Spårvägens HF
- Orienteering - Spårvägens OK
- Skiing - Spårvägens SK
- Swimming - Spårvägens SF
- Table tennis - Spårvägen Bordtennis
- Tennis - Spårvägen Tennis
- Weightlifting - Spårvägen Tyngdlyftning
- Volleyball - Spårvägens VBK
- Wrestling - Spårvägen Brottning
