= Emma Ljungberg =

Swedish discus thrower (born 1994)

Personal information
- Nationality: Sweden
- Born: 23 January 1994 (32 years, 191 days old)
- Home town: Nyköping
- Education: Nyköpings Gymnasium Tessin; University of Arizona

Sport
- Sport: Athletics
- Event: Discus throw
- College team: Arizona Wildcats
- Club: Spårvägens FK

Achievements and titles
- National finals: 2009 Swedish Indoor U16s; • Shot put, 17th; 2009 Swedish U16s; • Discus throw, 13th; 2010 Swedish U17s; • Discus throw, 12th; • Shot put, 5th; 2011 Swedish Champs; • Discus throw, 12th; 2011 Swedish U18s; • Discus throw, 1st (gold); 2012 Swedish Indoor U20s; • Shot put, 4th; 2012 Swedish U20s; • Discus throw, 2nd (silver); 2012 Swedish Champs; • Discus throw, 6th; 2013 Swedish Indoor U20s; • Weight throw, 5th; • Shot put, 4th; 2013 Swedish U20s; • Discus throw, 2nd (silver); 2013 Swedish Champs; • Discus throw, 12th; 2014 Swedish Champs; • Discus throw, NM; 2014 Swedish U23s; • Discus throw, 4th; 2015 Swedish Champs; • Discus throw, 10th; 2016 Swedish U23s; • Discus throw, 1st (gold); 2018 Swedish Champs; • Discus throw, 3rd (bronze); 2019 Swedish Throws Ch.; • Discus throw, 1st (gold); 2019 Swedish Champs; • Discus throw, 3rd (bronze); 2020 Swedish Champs; • Discus throw, 2nd (silver); 2021 Swedish Champs; • Discus throw, 2nd (silver); 2022 Swedish Champs; • Discus throw, 3rd (bronze); 2023 Swedish Champs; • Discus throw, 4th
- Personal best: Discus throw: 59.48m (2023)
- Updated on 15 January 2024

Emma Ljungberg (born 23 January 1994) is a Swedish discus thrower from Nyköping. She was the 2019 Swedish Throws Championships winner in the discus, and she has represented Sweden at several international competitions.

== Career ==
Ljungberg started competing as early as 2008, and finished 13th at the 2009 Swedish U16 discus championships. The following year, her best showing came in the shot put to finish 5th at the Swedish U17 championships, though it was her 44.74 m discus mark in 2011 that qualified her for the World U18 Championships. At the championships, she finished 26th in qualification and did not advance to the finals.

Ljungberg qualified for the 2012 World U20 Championships with a 49.97 m personal best at the Bottnarydskastet, and there she improved to 23rd in qualification but again did not make the finals. She did make the finals of the 2019 European U20 Championships, where she finished 9th overall.

From 2015 to 2018, Ljungberg competed for the Arizona Wildcats track and field team in the NCAA. She qualified for the 2015 European U23 Championships, where she did not advance to the finals.

Ljungberg finished 23rd at the 2016 NCAA Division I Outdoor Track and Field Championships West preliminary round, and then went on to win her first national title at the Swedish U23 Championships. In 2018, she finished 6th in her first time competing at the Finnkampen.

In 2019, Ljungberg won the Riksmästerskapen i Vinterkast (Swedish throwing championships) with a 52.78 m throw. After runner-up finishes at the 2020 Swedish Athletics Championships and 2021 championships, she placed 19th at the 2022 European Throwing Cup. She finished 6th at the 2023 BAUHAUS-galan Diamond League meeting.

== Personal life ==
Ljungberg is from Nyköping where she attended Nyköpings Gymnasium Tessin high school. She was originally part of the Nyköpings BIS athletics club under coach Håkan Fridhäller, but she transferred to Spårvägens FK in 2018.

== Statistics ==
=== Personal best progression ===
Discus Throw progression
#	Mark	Pl.	Competition	Venue	Date	Ref
1	34.75 m	1st place, gold medalist(s)	Nyköping	Nyköping, Sweden	15 Sep 2009	
2	42.77 m	1st place, gold medalist(s)	Trosa	Trosa, Sweden	8 Aug 2010	
3	44.74 m	4th		Nyköping, Sweden	27 May 2011	
4	49.82 m	3rd place, bronze medalist(s)	Trosa	Trosa, Sweden	9 Jun 2012	
5	49.97 m	2nd place, silver medalist(s)	Bottnarydskastet	Bottnaryd, Sweden	15 Jun 2012	
6	50.32 m	2nd place, silver medalist(s)	Nordic Ch	Espoo, Finland	16 Aug 2013	
7	50.88 m	2nd place, silver medalist(s)	Puma Outdoor, Paradise Valley CC	Phoenix, AZ	27 Mar 2015	
8	51.48 m	6th	Mesa Classic, Mesa CC	Mesa, AZ	9 Apr 2015	
9	51.82 m	1st place, gold medalist(s)	Mesa T-Bird Invitational	Mesa, AZ	24 Apr 2015	
10	53.37 m	1st place, gold medalist(s)	Holualoa Tucson Marathon & Damascus Bakeries Half-Marathon	Tucson, AZ	9 Dec 2016	
11	53.60 m	2nd place, silver medalist(s)	Kasttävling fredag	Växjö, Sweden	9 May 2019	
12	55.15 m	1st place, gold medalist(s)		Halmstad, Sweden	15 Jun 2019	
13	56.10 m	1st place, gold medalist(s)	Victor Svanesohn Memorial	Helsingborg, Sweden	20 Jun 2020	
14	56.40 m	1st place, gold medalist(s)	Västerortsmästerskapen	Hässelby, Sweden	3 Jul 2020	
15	58.83 m	1st place, gold medalist(s)	Simons Kast	Örbyhus, Sweden	3 Jun 2023	
16	59.48 m	1st place, gold medalist(s)	Kringelspelen med Kringelkastet	Södertälje, Sweden	5 Jun 2023	
