= Upsala IF =

Swedish sports club

- Full name: Upsala Idrottsförening
- Nickname: UIF
- Founded: 1904
- Ground: Ekebydalens IP; Uppsala; Sweden
- Chairman: Marcus Kvarneå
- Head coach: Johan Nilsson
- League: Division 5
- 2018: Division 4 Uppland, 11th (Relegated)
Home colours	Away colours

Upsala Idrottsförening, commonly known as Upsala IF, is a Swedish sports club located in the city of Uppsala.

== Background ==
Upsala IF was formed on 11 December 1904 when IK Swithiod and Erikslunds IK decided to merge. It was intended that the new club would be named Allmänna Idrottsklubben, Uppsala, but the club was refused entry into the Riksidrottsförbundet (Swedish Sports Confederation) because of the similarity to the name used by AIK in the northern suburbs of Stockholm. The name was eventually changed at the beginning of 1907 to Upsala Idrottsförening and the club joined the RF.

UIF provides a classic example of a multi-sport club with five active sections covering boxing, football / youth football, athletics, handball and orienteering. Over the years the club had as many as 14 sports in its programme including bandy, ice hockey, chess, tennis, cycling, skiing, racewalking and swimming but these sports are no longer active. The club currently has nearly 2,000 members.

Since their foundation, Upsala IF has participated mainly in the middle and the lower divisions of the Swedish football league system.

Upsala IF is affiliated to Upplands Fotbollförbund.

== Football ==
=== Recent history ===
In recent seasons Upsala IF have competed in the following divisions:

2018 – Division IV, Uppland
2017 – Division IV, Uppland
2016 – Division III, Östra Svealand
2015 – Division II, Norra Svealand
2014 – Division III, Östra Svealand
2013 – Division IV, Uppland
2012 – Division IV, Uppland
2011 – Division III, Norra Svealand
2010 – Division IV, Uppland
2009 – Division IV, Uppland
2008 – Division IV, Uppland
2007 – Division IV, Uppland
2006 – Division IV, Uppland
2005 – Division IV, Uppland
2004 – Division V, Uppland Norra
2003 – Division IV, Uppland
2002 – Division IV, Uppland
2001 – Division III, Norra Svealand
2000 – Division IV, Uppland/Gotland Höst
2000 – Division IV, Uppland Östra
1999 – Division III, Norra Svealand

=== Attendances ===
In recent seasons Upsala IF has had the following average attendances:

Season	Average attendance	Division / Section	Level
2009	Not available	Div 4 Uppland	Tier 6
2010	71	Div 4 Uppland	Tier 6
2011	127	Div 3 Norra Svealand	Tier 5
2012	58	Div 4 Uppland	Tier 6
2013	71	Div 4 Uppland	Tier 6
2014	102	Div 3 Östra Svealand,	Tier 5
2015	178	Div 2 Norra Svealand,	Tier 4
2016	52	Div 3 Östra Svealand,	Tier 5
2017	67	Div 4 Uppland	Tier 6
2018	80	Div 4 Uppland	Tier 6

* Attendances are provided in the Publikliga sections of the Svenska Fotbollförbundet website.

== Athletics ==
Pole vaulter Armand Duplantis is the most notable performer from the club. Other notable club members include:

- Caisa-Marie Lindfors (born 2000), Swedish discus thrower
- Andreas Gustafsson, Swedish racewalker
- Isak Andersson, Swedish hurdler
