= Hanna Lindholm =

Swedish long-distance runner

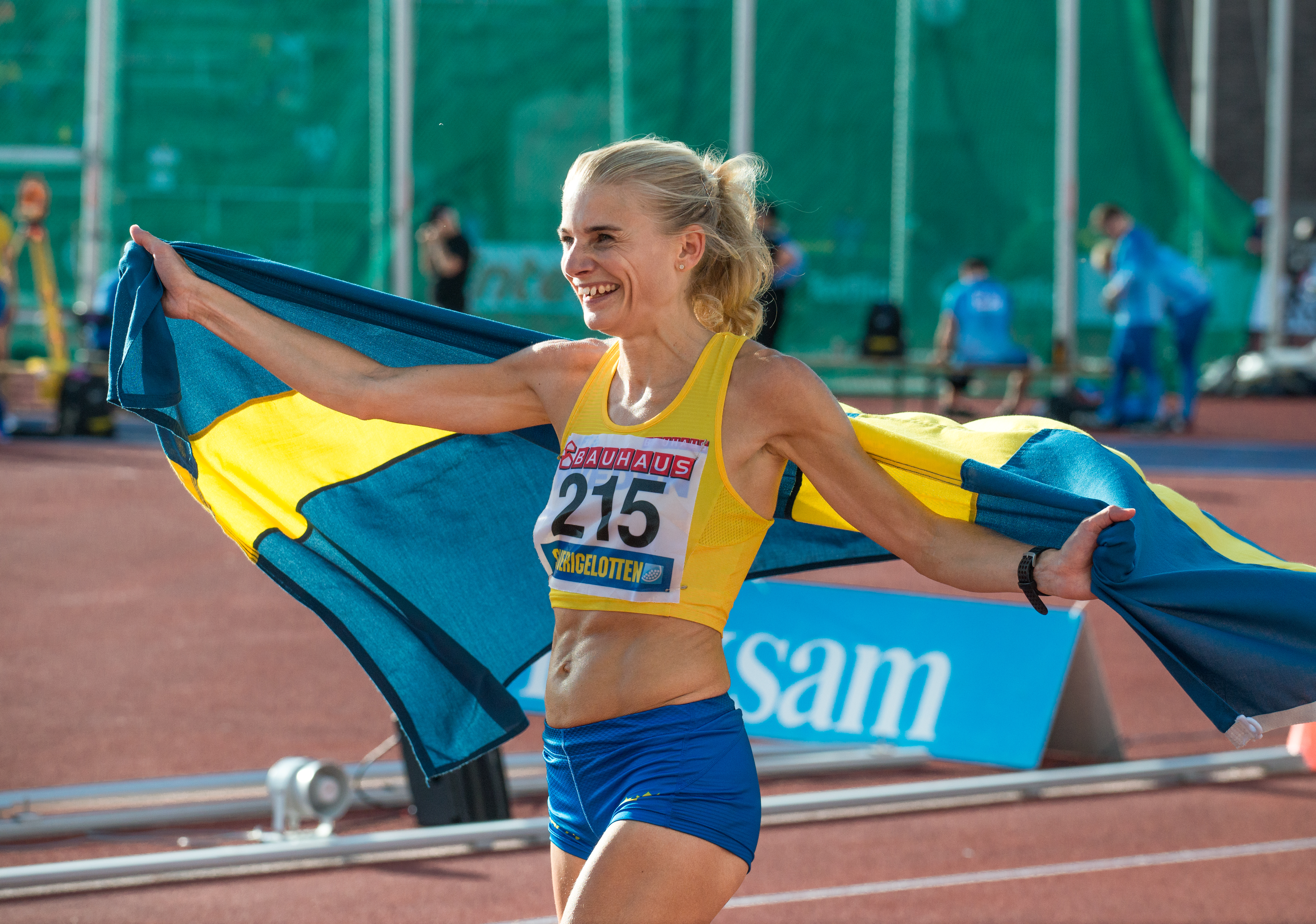
- Hanna Lindholm in 2019

Personal information
- Born: 28 November 1979 (age 46)

Sport
- Country: Sweden
- Sport: Long-distance running
Medal record
Women's long-distance running
Swedish Athletics Championships
Gold medal – first place	2018 Eskilstuna	10K run
Silver medal – second place	2019 Karlstad	Half marathon
Bronze medal – third place	2019 Karlstad	Marathon

Hanna Lindholm (born 28 November 1979) is a Swedish long-distance runner. She competed in the women's half marathon at the 2020 World Athletics Half Marathon Championships held in Gdynia, Poland.

In 2014, she competed in the women's marathon at the European Athletics Championships held in Zürich, Switzerland where she finished in 42nd place. In 2018, she finished in 22nd place in the women's marathon at the European Athletics Championships held in Berlin, Germany. A month later, she won the women's race at the Stockholm Half Marathon held in Stockholm, Sweden.

She competed in the women's marathon at the 2022 World Athletics Championships held in Eugene, Oregon, United States.
