= Emma Dahl =

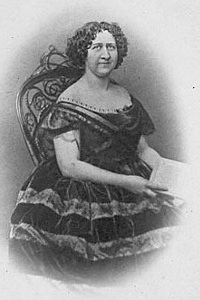
Emma Dahl

Emma Dahl (6 April 1819 - 13 December 1896) was a Norwegian (originally German) opera singer and composer.

She made a successful opera tour in Germany, Denmark and Sweden in 1836-41. After her marriage to the Norwegian publisher Johan Fjeldsted Dahl in 1841, she settled in Oslo, where she was active as a concert singer and a music instructor and hosted a literary salon which was a center of the city's artistic life. She made her debut as a composer in 1863.
