= Robel Fsiha =

Swedish long-distance runner

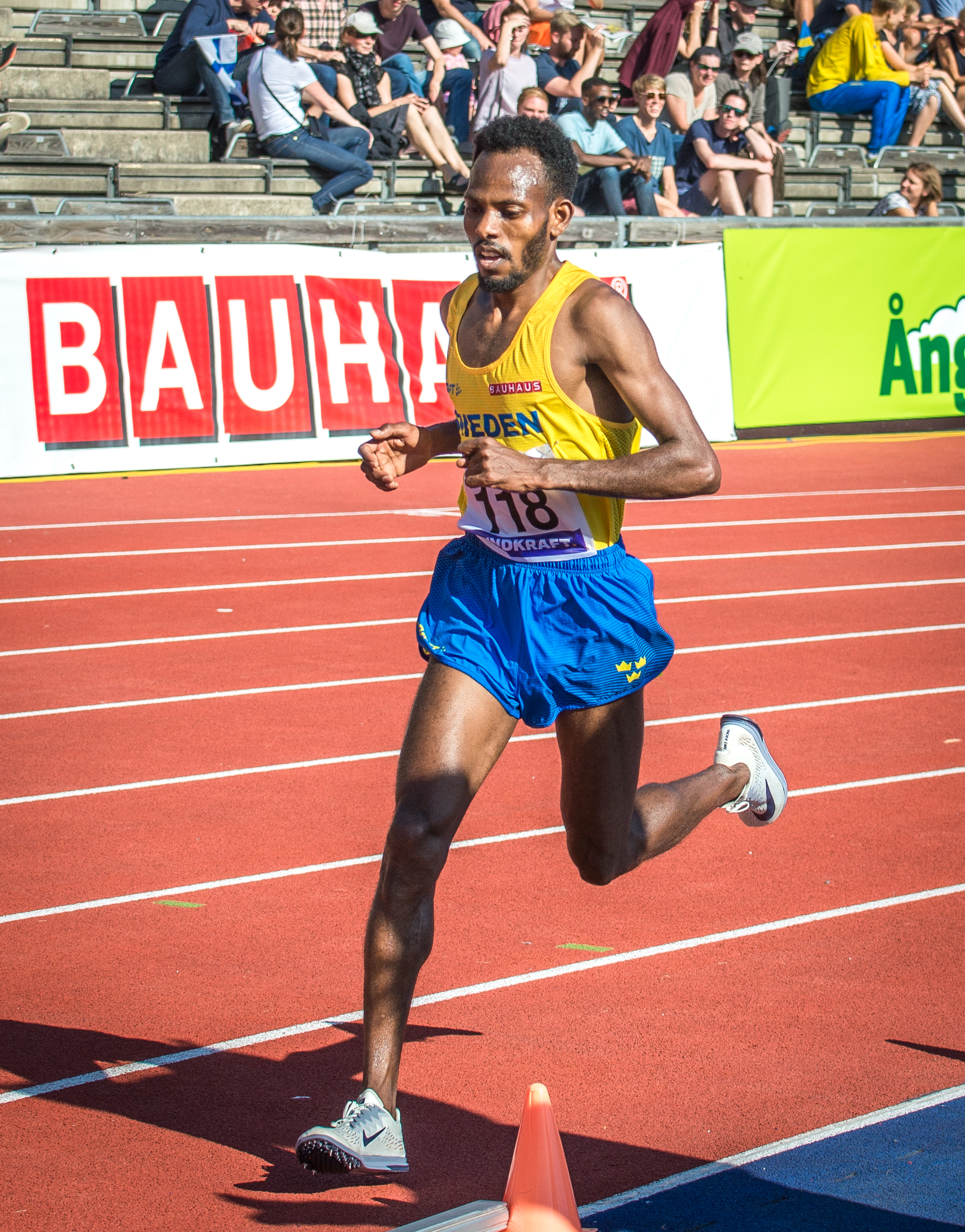
- Robel Fsiha in 2019

Personal information
- Born: 7 March 1996 (age 29) Eritrea
- Occupation: Long-distance runner

Sport
- Country: Sweden
- Sport: Long-distance running

Robel Fsiha (born 7 March 1996) is a Swedish long-distance runner.

Fsiha emigrated from Eritrea to Sweden as a refugee in 2013.

== Career ==
In 2019, he competed in the senior men's race at the 2019 IAAF World Cross Country Championships held in Aarhus, Denmark. He finished in 17th place. In the same year, he won the senior men's race at the 2019 European Cross Country Championships held in Lisbon, Portugal.

Fsiha was banned from competition for four years in May 2020 after testing positive for artificial testosterone. The ban lasts from 5 February 2020 till 4 February 2024.
