= Suldan Hassan =

Swedish athletics competitor

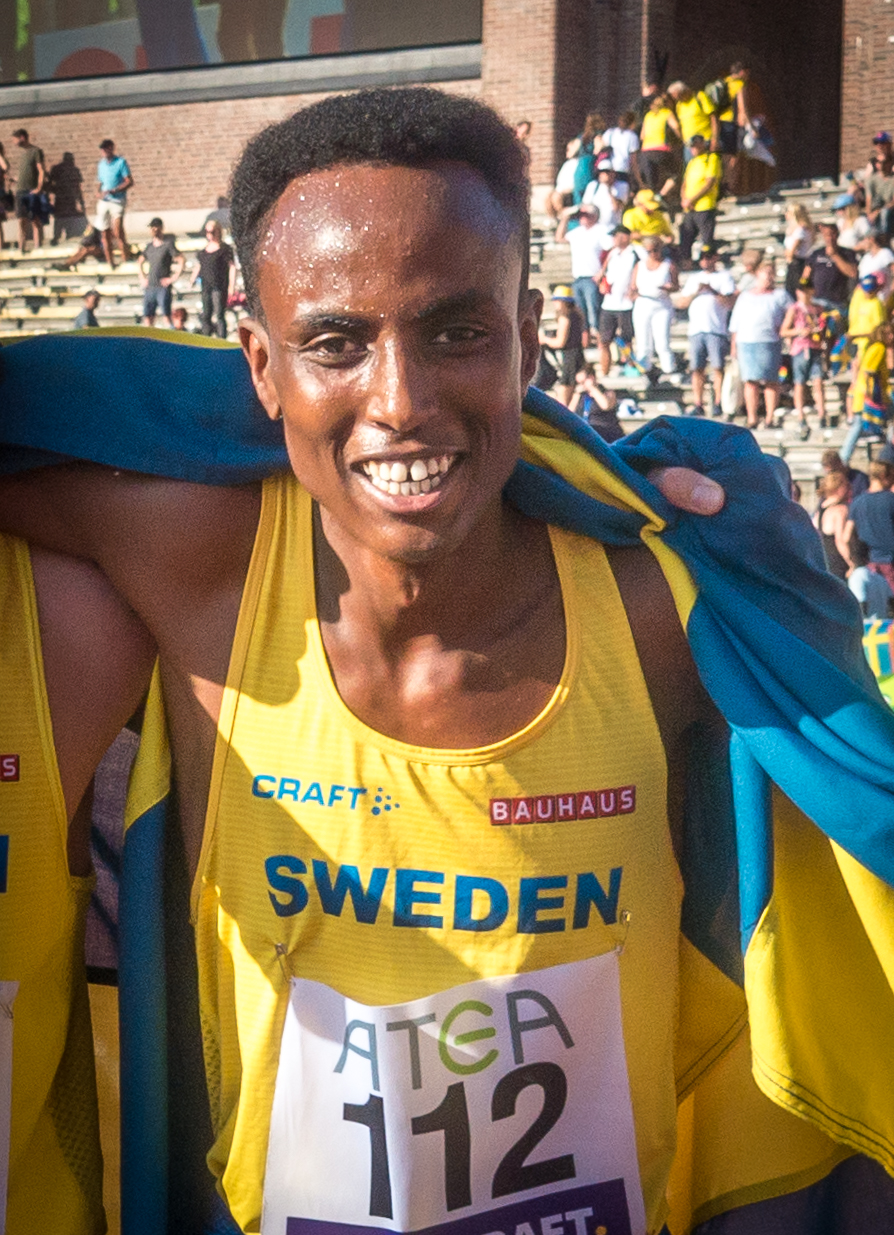
Suldan Hassan

Suldan Hassan (born 1 April 1998) is a Somali-Swedish athlete.

== Early life ==
Hassan was born on 1 April 1998, in Somalia. At the age of four, he became blind in one eye due to an accident. He moved to Sweden at the age of 11, and took up long-distance running at the age of 15. In 2015, he became a naturalized Swedish citizen.

== Career ==
In the 2019 Swedish Athletics Championships, he won a gold medal in the 5000m.

He qualified for the 2024 Summer Olympics, setting a national record with a time of 2.07.36. He finished 28th in the competition.
