= Napoleon Solomon =

Swedish steeplechase runner

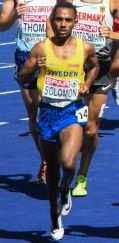
- Napoleon Solomon in 2018

Personal information
- Nickname: Nappe
- Born: 14 February 1994 (age 31) Eritrea

Sport
- Sport: Athletics
- Event: 3000 m steeplechase
- Club: Fredrikshofs FI (–2015); Turebergs FK (2016–)

Napoleon Solomon (born 14 February 1994) is a Swedish runner specialising in the 3000 metres steeplechase. He represented his country at the 2017 World Championships without advancing from the first round.

Originally from Eritrea, he came to Sweden as a thirteen-year-old.

== Career ==
=== 2013 ===
Solomon set personal bests in the 800 metres and 1500 metres indoors at the 2013 Hammarby Games in February, where he won the 1500 metres in a time of 3:54.90, and came seventh in the 1500 metres in a time of 1:59.55.

He competed in the 2013 Swedish Indoor Championships, where he came seventh in the 3000 metres. He set a personal best there at this distance, with a time of 8:26.06.

== International competitions ==
Year	Competition	Venue	Position	Event	Notes
Representing Sweden
2017	World Championships	London, United Kingdom	29th (h)	3000 m s'chase	8:35.95
2018	European 10,000m Cup	London, United Kingdom	15th	10,000 m	28:33.33
2018	European Championships	Berlin, Germany	12th	3000 m s'chase	8:43.66

== Personal bests ==
Outdoor

- 800 metres – 1:56.36 (Gävle 2015)
- 1500 metres – 3:53.05 (Gothenburg 2014)
- 3000 metres – 8:22.82 (Sollentuna 2013)
- 5000 metres – 13:52.45 (Rovereto 2018)
- 10,000 metres – 28:33.33 (London 2018)
- 10 kilometres – 28:56 (Stockholm 2018)
- Half marathon – 1:01:17 (Barcelona 2019)
- 3000 metres steeplechase – 8:23.54 (Rome 2018)

Indoor

- 800 metres – 1:59.55 (Sätra 2013)
- 1500 metres – 3:54.90 (Sätra 2013)
- 3000 metres – 8:26.06 (Norrköping 2013)
