= Jiannis Smalios =

Greek-Swedish javelin thrower

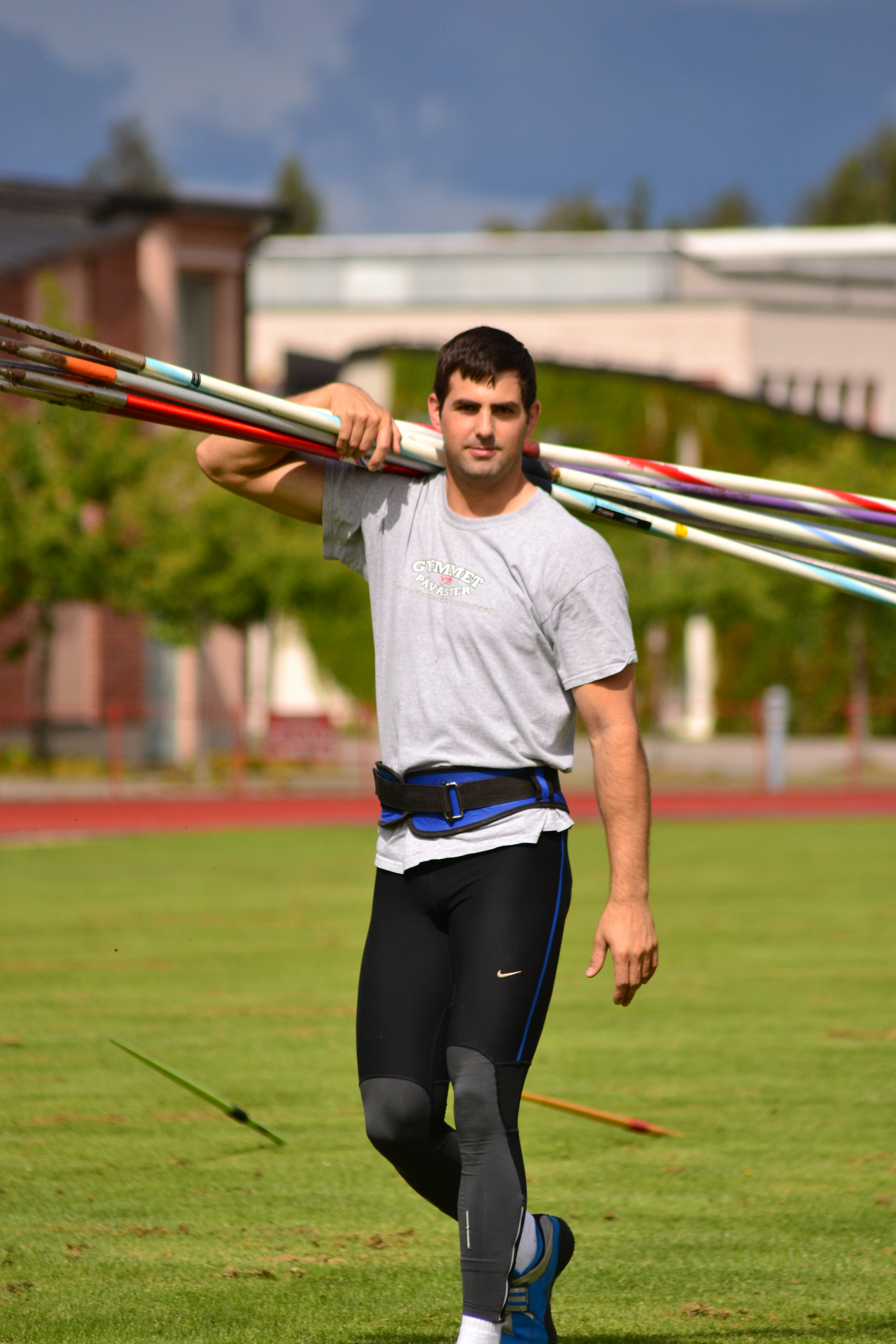

Personal information
- Full name: Ioannis-Georgios Karl Smalios
- Nationality: Greece Sweden
- Born: 17 February 1987 (age 39) Stockholm, Sweden
- Height: 1.92 m (6 ft 3 1/2 in)
- Weight: 90 kg (198 lb)

Sport
- Sport: Athletics
- Event: Javelin throw
- Club: Thorén Track & Field Örebro (SWE)
- Coached by: Arto Thor

Achievements and titles
- World finals: 12th place in WJCH 2006 (Beijing, China)
- National finals: 1st place in 2017 (Helsingborg, Sweden)
- Personal best: Javelin throw: 81.89 m (2016)
Medal record
Men's athletics
Representing Greece
European Junior Championships
Gold medal – first place	2005 Kaunas	Javelin throw

Jiannis-Georgios Karl Smalios (also Ioannis-Georgios Smalios, Greek: Γιάννης-Γιώργος Σμαλιός; born February 17, 1987, in Stockholm, Sweden) is a Swedish-born Greek javelin thrower. He won the gold medal for his category at the 2005 European Junior Championships in Kaunas, Lithuania, with a personal best throw of 77.25 metres. In 2010, Smalios improved his own record to 80.77 metres at the European Athletics Outdoor Classic Meeting in Kalamata. A few months later, he applied for and was granted Swedish citizenship in order to compete internationally for his birth nation.

Smalios represented Greece at the 2008 Summer Olympics in Beijing, where he competed in the men's javelin throw. Smalios performed a best throw of 71.87 metres from his second attempt but fell short in his bid for the twelve-man final as he placed twenty-seventh overall in the qualifying rounds.

At the 2009 Mediterranean Games in Pescara, Italy, Smalios narrowly missed out of the medal in the same discipline by approximately two metres behind Slovenia's Matija Kranjc, attaining his seasonal best throw of 75.24 metres.
