= Isak Andersson =

Swedish hurdler

Personal information
- Nationality: Swedish
- Born: 29 January 1996 (age 30)

Sport
- Sport: Athletics
- Event(s): 100 metres hurdles, 60 metres hurdles
- Club: Upsala IF

Achievements and titles
- Personal bests: 400mH: 50.05 (2017); 200m: 21.30 (-0.2) (2020)

Isak Andersson (born 29 January 1996) is a Swedish hurdler. He is a 4-time Swedish Athletics Championships national champion in the 400 metres hurdles.

== Biography ==
Andersson's first senior national championship was in 2014, where he finished 4th in the 400 metres hurdles. His first national title was in 2016, and he would go on to win four titles in his primary event.

In 2017, Andersson competed at the 2017 European Athletics U23 Championships in the 400 m hurdles. He advanced from the semifinals with a personal best performance of 50.05 seconds, and he finished 6th in the final. Andersson finish 7th at the 2017 Stockholm Diamond League, scoring 2 points in the 2017 Diamond League season.

In 2019, as part of a publicity stunt Andersson ran 100 metres on wet ice in 13.16 seconds. It is believed to be the fastest 100 m performance ever on ice.

Andersson trains with the Upsala IF athletics club, which also includes pole vault world record holder Mondo Duplantis.

== Statistics ==
=== Personal bests ===
Event	Mark	Competition	Venue	Date
400 metres hurdles	50.05	2017 European Athletics U23 Championships	Bydgoszcz, Poland	15 July 2017
200 metres	21.30 (-0.2 m/s)	Kvällskampen 3	Uppsala, Sweden	1 July 2017
