= Louise Wiker =

Swedish long-distance runner

Personal information
- Born: 1 January 1979 (age 47)

Sport
- Country: Sweden
- Sport: Track and field
- Event: Marathon

Louise Wiker (born 1 January 1979) is a Swedish long-distance runner. She competed in the marathon event at the 2015 World Championships in Athletics in Beijing, China.
