= Cecilia Norrbom =

Swedish long-distance runner

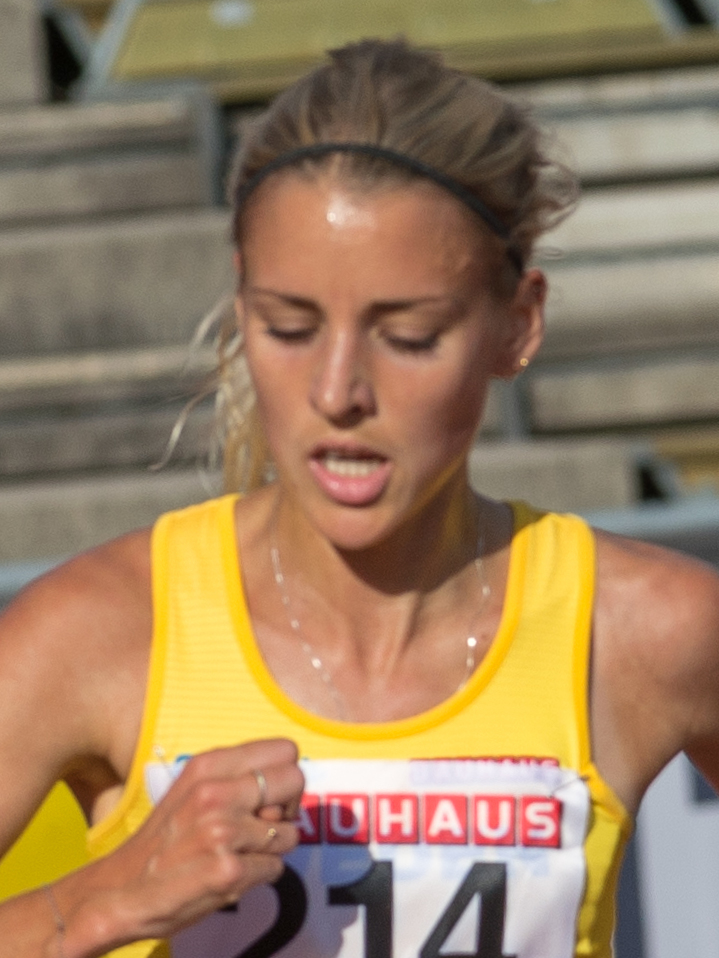

Personal information
- Nationality: Swedish
- Born: 28 January 1988 (age 37)

Sport
- Sport: Athletics
- Event: Marathon

Cecilia Norrbom (born 28 January 1988) is a Swedish athlete. She competed in the women's marathon event at the 2019 World Athletics Championships.
