= Malmö AI =

Swedish athletics club

Malmö Al
- Full name: Malmö Allmänna Idrottsförening
- Founded: 7 September 1908
- Ground: Malmö Stadion (outdoor), Malmö; Atleticum (indoor), Malmö

Malmö Allmänna Idrottsförening, also known simply as Malmö AI or MAI, is a Swedish athletics club based in Malmö. The club is affiliated with Svenska Friidrottsförbundet. The club's outdoor training and events are held at Malmö Stadion while indoor training and events are held at Atleticum. The club's colours are black, white and green which is reflected in their logo and kit. The club was founded on 7 September 1908.
