= Anastasia Denisova =

Belarusian orienteering competitor

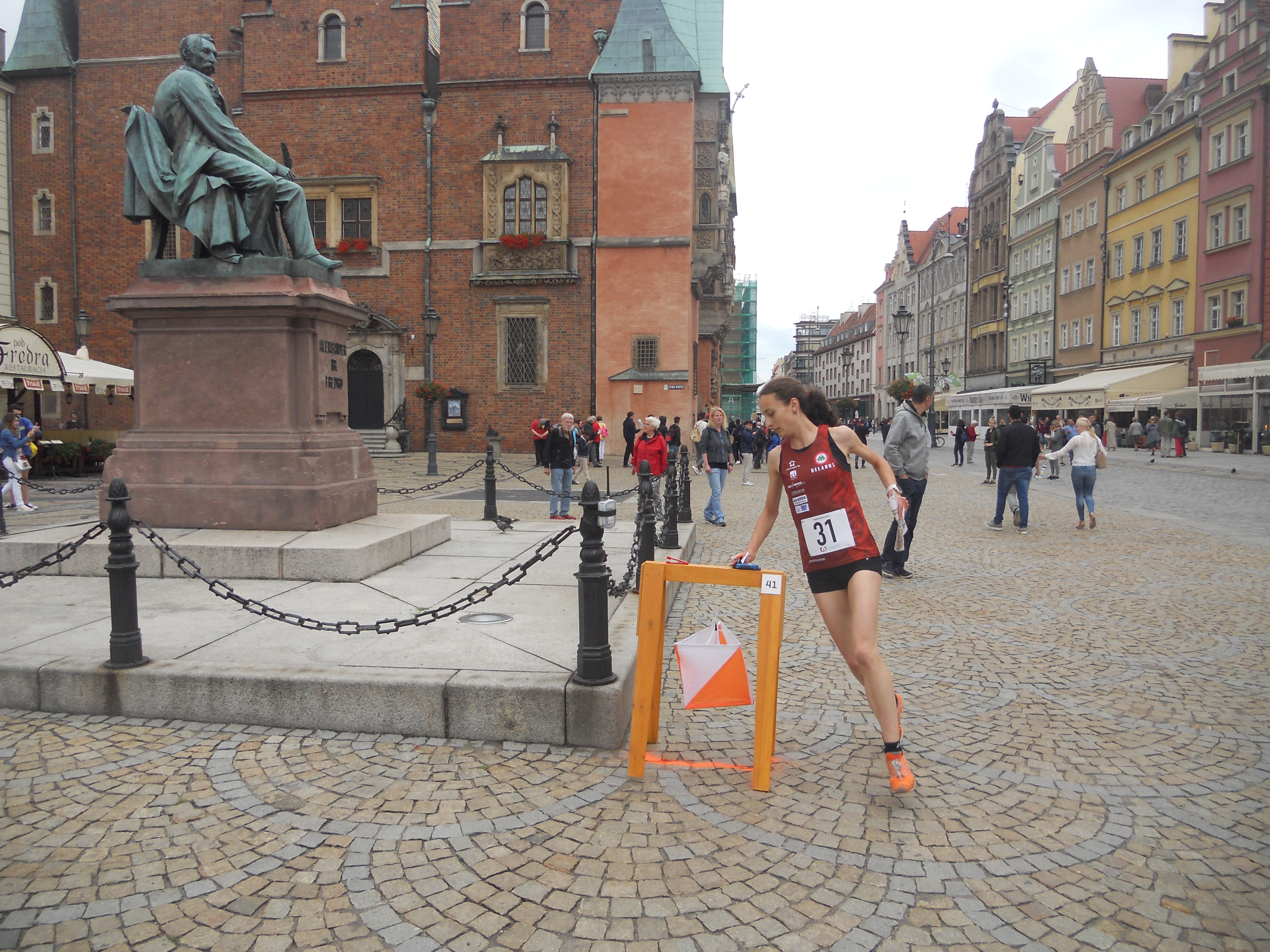
- Denisova during World Games 2017

Personal information
- Born: 29 June 1993 (age 32) Minsk

Sport
- Sport: Orienteering
- Club: Belaya Rus SOC; Savedalens AIK
Medal record
Women's orienteering
Representing Belarus
World Championships
Bronze medal – third place	2016 Strömstad	Sprint
Junior World Championships
Bronze medal – third place	2013 Hradec Králové	Sprint
European Youth Championships
Bronze medal – third place	2011 Jindrichuv Hradec	Sprint

Anastasia Denisova (Belarusian: Анастасія Дзянісава; born 29 June 1993) is a Belarusian orienteering competitor.

At the 2016 World Orienteering Championships in Strömstad she won a bronze medal in the sprint distance, behind Maja Alm and Judith Wyder, becoming the first Belarusian WOC medalist.
