= Hässelby SK =

Swedish sports club

- Full name: Hässelby Sportklubb
- Founded: 23 March 1913; 113 years ago
- Based in: Hässelby, Sweden
- Colors: Red, Black and Gold
- Website: http://www.hskfriidrott.se

Hässelby Sportklubb (English: "Hässelby Sports Club"), commonly referred to as Hässelby SK, or HSK is a professional sports club in Hässelby, Stockholm, Sweden. Founded in 1913, the club offers a range of sports, including football, athletics and floorball. The athletics club, Hässelby SK Friidrott is one of the most prominent clubs in Sweden.

Hässelby SK played a pivotal role in the establishment of a number of running events, including Stockholm Marathon, XL Galan and the Tjejmilen.

== History ==
=== Formation ===
In 1913, nine schoolboys decided to form Hässelby SK, or Hesselby SK as it was spelled at the time. The first club uniform consisted of a white shirt and blue pants with a white stripe at the bottom. In need for a sports field, the newly formed club wrote to the area's most influential man, Carl Bonde. He allowed HSK to borrow the "field next to the cowshed," which remains the club's location today.

=== 1914-1950 ===
By 1914, the club participated in various sports, including football, athletics, swimming, cross-country skiing, ice-skating and bandy, although competitions against other clubs were infrequent. The following year, HSK became a member of the Swedish Sports Confederation and the Swedish Athletics Association, and added cycling to its repertoire. Notably, Gunnar Sträng, who later served as the Swedish minister of finance, became a member of the club for swimming. Over time, HSK diversified further, establishing a women's section, and inaugurating its home field, Hässelby IP. The football club, Hässelby SK FF, became affiliated with the Swedish Football Association and started playing in Stockholmsserien klass 1.

=== 1950-1980 ===
The athletics section had been inactive for several years due to lack of interest and economic reasons, but after several unsuccessful attempts, it was possible to restart the athletics section in 1958. Despite the previous inactivity, the club still maintained its membership in the Swedish Athletics Association. After a cautious start as an athletics club, they managed to secure their first medal at the Swedish Athletics Championships after seven years, as Jan Olov Lindqvist finished third in the decathlon. Six years after this, Lennart Hedmark broke the Swedish record and finished second in the decathlon at the 1971 European Athletics Championships. This was only the beginning of the clubs strong presence in the combined events.

November 1978 would become an important month in Hässelby SK's history. Three members from Hässelby, the chairman Lars-Johan Oscarsson, Anders Olsson, and Bengt Olsson, met with three members from Spårvägens FK in a meeting that resulted in the formation of the Stockholm Marathon Group. The group that would become the organizer of Sweden's largest running event, Stockholm Marathon. The following year saw the premiere edition of Sweden's first marathon, a success along the streets of Stockholm.

=== 1980-present ===
In the early 80's the club started to gain traction. Anders Mossberg breaks the national record in triple jump and Christer Luthell and Conny Silfver both qualify for the European Championships in Athens in decathlon. Silfver, who later would serve as one of the leading coaches in the club, made it to the World Championships in Helsinki the following year. In the early 90's Johan Engholm wins the Classic Athen's Marathon and the club had its first Stockholm Marathon winner, Åke Eriksson.

Hässelby and Spårvägen organized Sweden's first large scale athletics event, XL Galan in the newly constructed Stockholm Globe Arena. The first meet in 1990 became a global success, with the world elite competing to an audience of more than 10.000 people. Over time, 12 world records was set at the meet and it hosted names like, Carl Lewis, Dayron Robles and Sifan Hassan.

== Notable athletes ==
- Angelica Bengtsson
- Isabellah Andersson
- Jessica Samuelsson
- Mattias Claesson
- Yussuf Saleh
- Johan Wissman
- Mattias Jons
