= Yolanda Ngarambe =

Swedish middle-distance runner

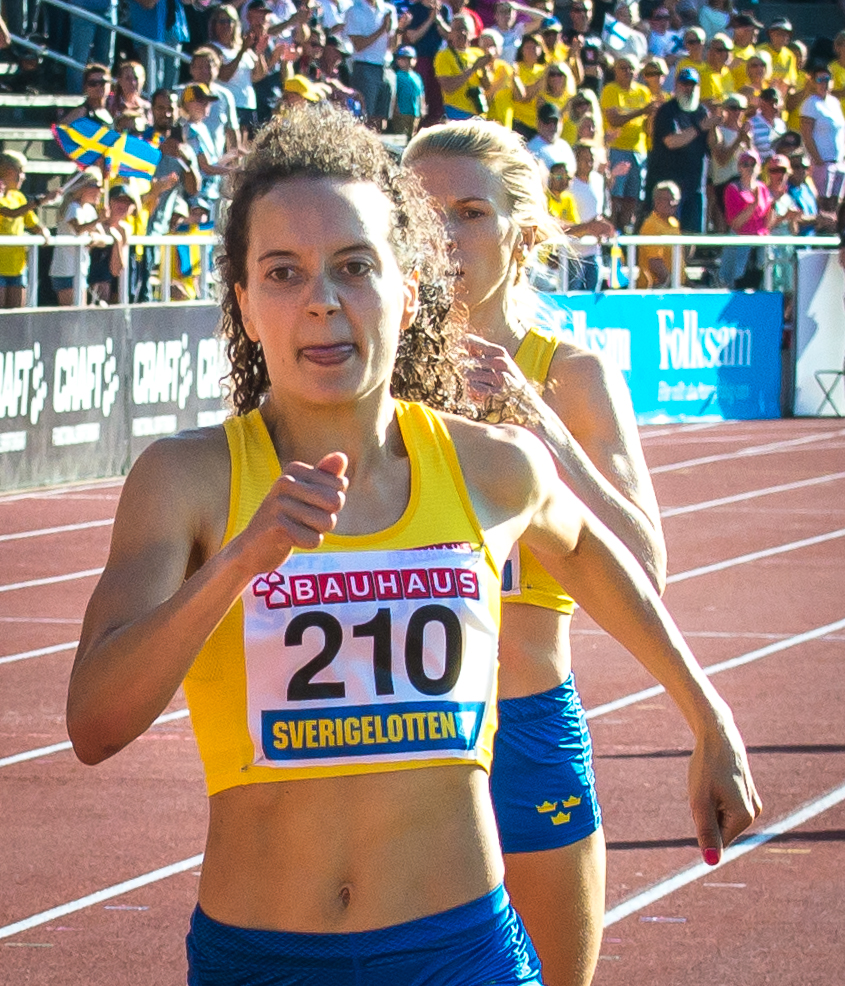
- Ngarambe in 2019

Personal information
- Nationality: Swedish
- Born: 14 September 1991 (age 34)

Sport
- Country: Sweden
- Sport: Athletics
- Event: Middle-distance running

Achievements and titles
- Personal best(s): 1500 m: 4:03.43; 3000 m: 9:06.52; 5000 m: 15:38.79
- Updated on 3 October 2019

Yolanda Eliisa Ngarambe (born 14 September 1991) is a Swedish-Finnish middle-distance runner, competing for Sweden.

She won the 3,000 metres at 2019 European Team Championships in Bydgoszcz, Poland.

== Early life ==
Ngarambe was born to a Banyarwanda father from Uganda and a Finnish mother. She has dual citizenship of Finland and Sweden.
