= Spårvägens FK =

Athletics club in Stockholm, Sweden

Spårvägens FK is an athletics club in Stockholm, Sweden serving as the athletics section of Spårvägens GoIF. Over the years, the association has become one of Sweden's most successful clubs with several championship medals and national team athletes. Every year, the club organizes the Stockholm Marathon, the Globen Galan, and the Tjejmilen together with Hässelby SK.

== History ==
The association was founded as Stockholms Spårvägars Gymnastik- och idrottsförening in 1919 and was originally only open to employees of Storstockholms Lokaltrafik (then called AB Stockholms Spårvägar).

Another club, Tyresö Friidrottsklubb, started as a part of Spårvägens FK in 1980, but broke away as a separate club in 1983.

In 2014, the club was controversially charged 32,500 SEK ($4737.07 USD) after their triple jumper Angelica Ström used the Gefle IF gym to practice despite having left Gefle for Spårvägens. After receiving the unexpected bill, Spårvägens leadership asked Ström if she had purchased the entire training hall.

In 2024, Daniel Ståhl vowed to donate his 50,000 SEK ($5827.51 USD) of prize money to Spårvägens FK after winning the Swedish Sports Awards.

== Athletes ==
- Lars Haglund (born 1940) is a former discus thrower. He represented Sweden at the 1964 Olympic discus throw and won the 1965 World University Games.
- Raimo Pihl (born 1949) is a former decathlete from Suodenniemi. He finished 4th in the 1976 Olympic decathlon.
- Sören Tallhem (born 1964) is a former shot putter. He finished 7th in the 1984 Olympic shot put.
- Mattias Sunneborn (born 1970) is a former long jumper. He finished 8th in the 1996 Olympic long jump.
- Anders Szalkai (born 1970) is a former long-distance runner specializing in the marathon. He finished 64th at the 1996 Olympic men's marathon.
- Claes Albihn (born 1971) represented Sweden at the 1996 Summer Olympics in the 110 m hurdles.
- Malin Ewerlöf-Krepp (born 1972) is a retired middle-distance runner. She qualified for the 1996 Olympic 1500 m semi-finals.
- Henrik Skoog (born 1979) is a former middle-distance runner specializing in the 5000 metres. He finished 6th at the 2006 European Championships men's 5000 m.
- Niklas Arrhenius (born 1982) is a discus thrower. He represented Sweden at the 2008 Summer Olympics.
- Moa Hjelmer (born 1990) is a sprinter. She placed 30th in the 400 m heats at the 2012 Olympics.
- Daniel Ståhl (born 1992) is a discus thrower. He was the 2020 Olympic champion and a two-time world champion in 2019 and 2023.
- Emma Ljungberg (born 1994) is a discus thrower from Nyköping. She finished 9th at the 2019 European U20 Championships.
- Irene Ekelund (born 1997) is a sprinter. She won the 2013 World Youth Championships 200 metres.
