= Adhanom Abraha =

Swedish long-distance runner

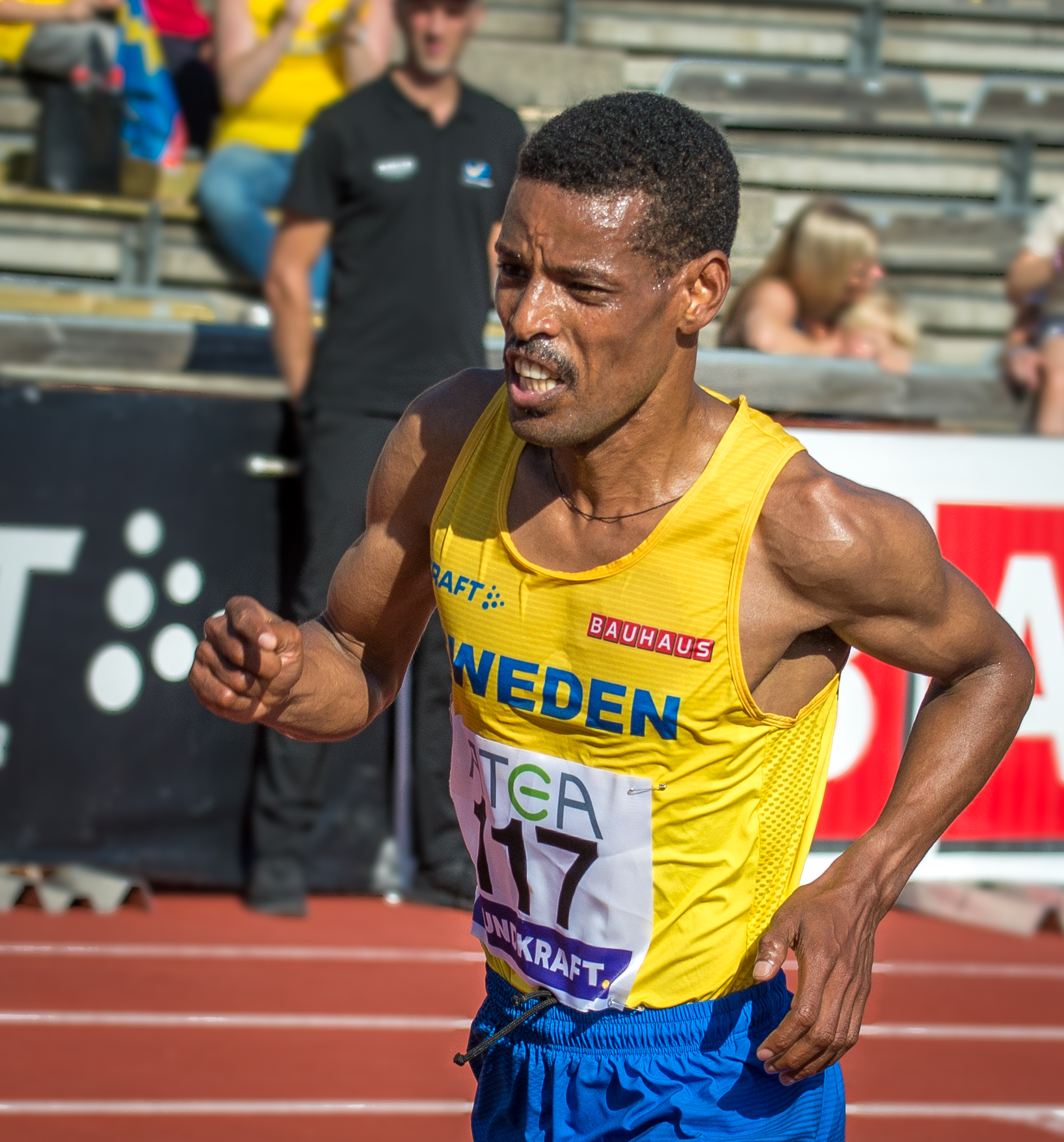
- Adhanom Abraha in 2019

Personal information
- Born: 1 June 1977 (age 48)

Sport
- Country: Sweden
- Sport: Long-distance running

Adhanom Abraha (born 1 June 1977) is a Swedish long-distance runner. In 2019, he competed in the men's marathon at the 2019 World Athletics Championships held in Doha, Qatar. He finished in 28th place.

In 2010, he competed in the men's half marathon at the 2010 IAAF World Half Marathon Championships held in Nanning, China. He finished in 14th place.

In 2018, he transferred from Eritrea to represent Sweden.

In 2020, he competed in the men's race at the 2020 World Athletics Half Marathon Championships held in Gdynia, Poland.
