= Emil Millán de la Oliva =

Swedish long-distance runner

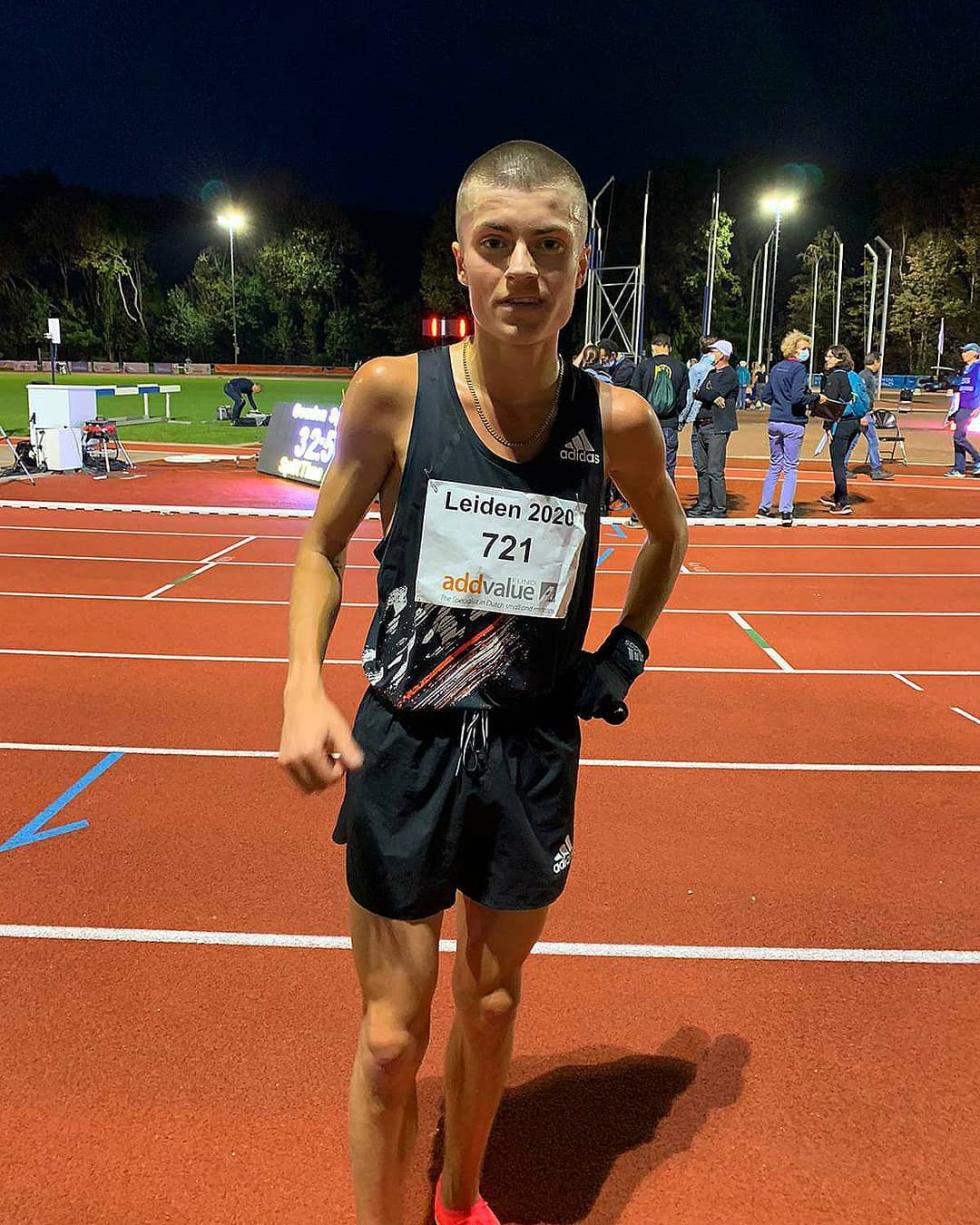
- de la Oliva in 2020

Personal information
- Born: 24 July 2001 (age 24)

Sport
- Country: Sweden
- Sport: Athletics
- Event: Long-distance running

Emil Millán de la Oliva (born 24 July 2001) is a Swedish long-distance runner. In 2020, he competed in the men's race at the 2020 World Athletics Half Marathon Championships held in Gdynia, Poland.
