= Moa Granat =

Swedish athlete

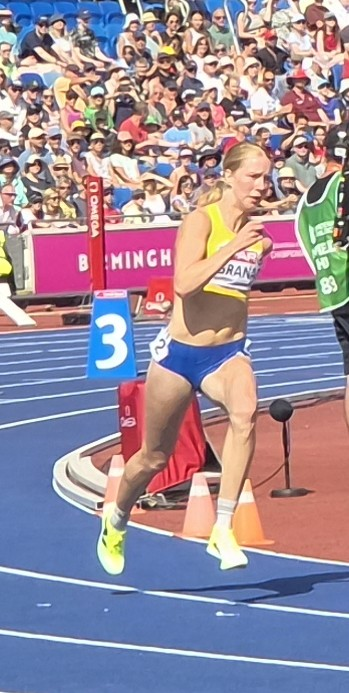

Personal information
- Born: 8 August 2004 (age 22)

Sport
- Sport: Track and field

Moa Granat (born 8 August 2004) is a Swedish athlete. At the European Athletics U20 Championships in Tallinn she won Silver at the 400 metres hurdles event. At the 2023 European Athletics U20 Championships in Jerusalem she won the gold medal at 400 metres hurdle. In June 2025 during a Grand Prix in Lathis, Finland, Granat ran at 55,68 at 400 metres hurdles, the fourth fastest Swedish time ever. And the fastest Swedish time on the distance since 1999.
