= Samrawit Mengsteab =

Swedish middle-distance runner

Personal information
- Nationality: Swedish
- Born: 15 April 1990 (age 36) Ethiopia

Sport
- Sport: Athletics
- Event: 3000 metres
Medal record
Women's athletics
Representing Sweden
European Cross Country Championships
Bronze medal – third place	2019 Lisbon	Senior race
Bronze medal – third place	2021 Dublin	Senior team

Samrawit Mengsteab (born 15 April 1990) is a Swedish athlete. She competed in the women's 3000 metres event at the 2021 European Athletics Indoor Championships. Mengsteab represented Eritrea until 31 March 2017. From 2 November 2018 she is eligible to represent Sweden.
