= Emil Danielsson =

Swedish middle-distance runner

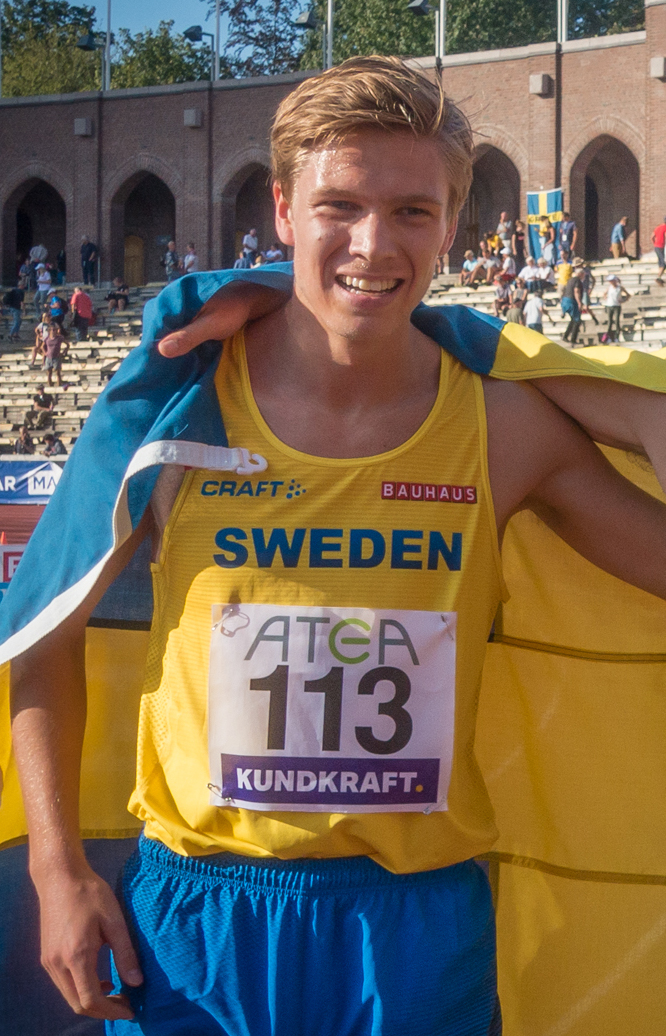

Personal information
- Nationality: Swedish
- Born: 5 September 1997 (age 28)

Sport
- Sport: Track
- Event: 1500 metres – 5000 metres
- Club: Spårvägens FK

Emil Danielsson (born 5 September 1997) is a Swedish middle and long-distance runner. He set a national indoor mile record at the 2023 Czech Indoor Gala meet in Ostrava. He also competed in the 1500 metres and 5000 metres at the 2023 World Athletics Championships. He is the son of the Swedish runner Jonny Danielsson.

== Personal bests ==
Outdoor

- 800 metres – 1:50.40 (Sollentuna 2023)
- 1500 metres – 3:34.16 (Budapest 2023)
- 3000 metres – 7:39.70 (Stockholm 2023)
- 5000 metres – 13:13.43 (Göteborg 2023)
- 10,000 metres – 28:58.61 (Walnut 2022)

Indoor

- 1500 metres – 3:40.94 (Malmö 2023)
- Mile – 3:57.28 (Ostrava 2023) NR
- 3000 metres – 7:48.23 (Manchester 2023)
