= 2020 Swedish Indoor Athletics Championships =

- Dates: 22–23 February 2020
- Host city: Växjö, Sweden
- Venue: Telekonsult Arena
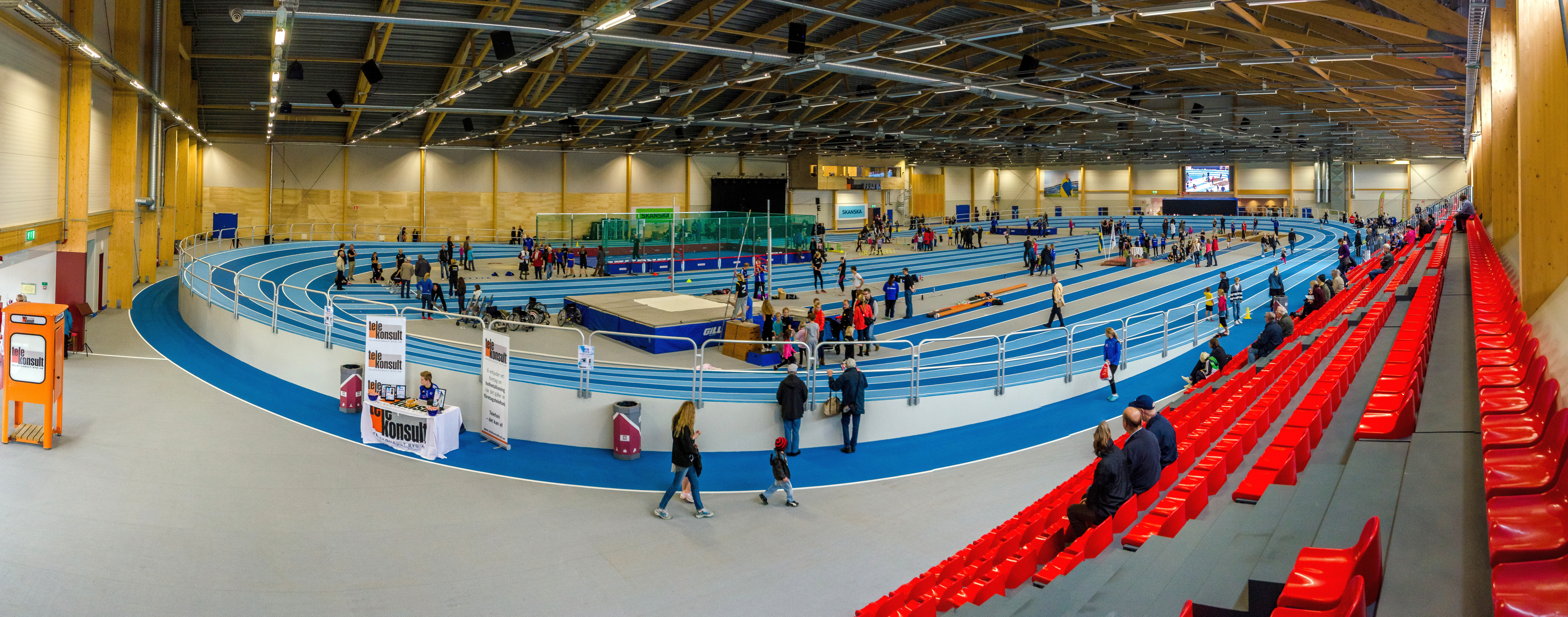

The 2020 Swedish Indoor Athletics Championships (Swedish: Svenska inomhusmästerskapen i friidrott 2020) was the 55th edition of the national championship in indoor track and field for Sweden. It was held on 22 and 23 February at the Telekonsult Arena in Växjö.

The national indoor championship in combined track and field events was held separately on 1 and 2 February at the Sollentuna friidrottshall in Sollentuna Municipality.

== Results ==
=== Men ===
Event	Gold		Silver		Bronze	
60 metres	Emmanuel Dawlson; Hammarby IF	6.73	Odain Rose; Spårvägens FK	6.74	Tom Kling-Baptiste; Huddinge AIS	6.76
200 metres	Carl Bengtström; Örgryte IS	21.26	Erik Annerfalk; Ullevi FK	21.64	Dennis Otieno; Hammarby IF	21.80
400 metres	Emil Johansson; Turebergs FK	47.76	Hampus Widlund; IFK Växjö	48.37	Johan Claeson; Linköpings GIF	48.39
800 metres	Andreas Kramer; Sävedalens AIK	1:47.66	Joakim Andersson; Spårvägens FK	1:48.52	Robin Rohlén; IFK Umeå Friidrott	1:48.72
1500 metres	Johan Rogestedt; Stenungsunds FI	3:50.40	Efrem Brhane; Västerås FK	3:51.17	Omar Ismail; Högby IF	3:52.49
3000 metres	Andreas Almgren; Turebergs FK	7:48.34	Kalle Berglund; Spårvägens FK	7:57.78	Mohammad Reza; Spårvägens FK	8:07.01
60 m hurdles	Max Hrelja; Malmö AI	7.75	Jonathan Holm; Hammarby IF	7.87	Filip Björklund; Örgryte IS	7.94
High jump	Emil Uhlin; Falu IK	2.12 m	Melwin Lycke Holm; Kils AIK	2.10 m	Oskar Lundqvist; Upsala IF Friidrott	2.08 m
Pole vault	Melker Svärd Jacobsson; Örgryte IS	5.50 m	Simon Thor; Hässelby SK	5.07 m	Robin Jacobsson; Ullevi FK	5.07 m
Long jump	Thobias Montler; Malmö AI	8.22 m	Jesper Hellström; Hässelby SK	7.57 m	Fredrik Samuelsson; Hässelby SK	7.42 m
Triple jump	Jesper Hellström; Hässelby SK	16.36 m	Erik Ehrlin; Hammarby IF	15.78 m	Artur Engström; Örgryte IS	15.30 m
Shot put	Wictor Petersson; Malmö AI	20.89 m	Viktor Gardenkrans; Athletics 24Seven SK	18.89 m	Gabriel Heen; Hässelby SK	18.06 m
Weight throw	Elias Håkansson; Spårvägens FK	22.55 m	Ragnar Carlsson; Hässelby SK	22.29 m	Simon Pettersson; Hässelby SK	20.12 m
Heptathlon	Fredrik Samuelsson; Hässelby SK	5808 pts	Marcus Nilsson; Högby IF	5597 pts	Andreas Gustafsson; Upsala IF Friidrott	5457 pts

=== Women ===
Event	Gold		Silver		Bronze	
60 metres	Filippa Sivnert; Malmö AI	7.38	Elin Östlund; KFUM Örebro	7.38	Iréne Ekelund; Spårvägens FK	7.42
200 metres	Moa Hjelmer; Spårvägens FK	23.52	Lisa Lilja; Ullevi FK	23.62	Elin Östlund; KFUM Örebro	24.74
400 metres	Moa Hjelmer; Spårvägens FK	54.53	Matilda Hellqvist; Ullevi FK	54.83	Lovisa Linde; Täby IS	55.31
800 metres	Rebecca Högberg; KFUM Örebro	2:12.09	Ellinor Aurell; Ängelholms IF	2:12.32	Madeleine Björlin-Delmar; IFK Göteborg	2:13.02
1500 metres	Hanna Hermansson; Turebergs FK	4:17.22	Samrawit Mengsteab; Hälle IF	4:18.45	Linn Söderholm; Sävedalens AIK	4:30.17
3000 metres	Samrawit Mengsteab; Hälle IF	9:46.00	Hanna Hermansson; Turebergs FK	9:46.40	Sara Christiansson; Sävedalens AIK	9:48.52
60 m hurdles	Tilde Johansson; Falkenbergs IK	8.29	Lovisa Karlsson; Högby IF	8.35	Amanda Holmberg; Lidköpings IS	8.45
High jump	Bianca Salming; Turebergs FK	1.87 m	Sofie Skoog; IF Göta	1.85 m	Maja Nilsson; Örgryte IS	1.82 m
Pole vault	Angelica Bengtsson; Hässelby SK	4.74 m	Michaela Meijer; Örgryte IS	4.38 m	Linnea Jönsson; IFK Helsingborg	4.18 m
Long jump	Khaddi Sagnia; Ullevi FK	6.57 m	Malin Marmbrandt; Västerås FK	6.24 m	Tilde Johansson; Falkenbergs IK	6.19 m
Triple jump	Rebecka Abrahamsson; Örgryte IS	13.31 m	Maja Åskag; Råby-Rekarne FIF	13.29 m	Aina Grikšaitė; Spårvägens FK	13.23 m
Shot put	Fanny Roos; Athletics 24Seven SK	17.92 m	Frida Åkerström; Hässelby SK	16.36 m	Ásdís Hjálmsdóttir Annerud; Spårvägens FK	16.14 m
Weight throw	Ida Storm; Malmö AI	23.23 m	Grete Ahlberg; Hammarby IF	19.82 m	Eleni Larsson; Spårvägens FK	19.54 m
Pentathlon	Bianca Salming; Turebergs FK	4422 pts	Lovisa Karlsson; Högby IF	3967 pts	Klara Rådbo; Hässelby SK	3916 pts
