= 2025 European Athletics U23 Championships – Men's high jump =

Men's high jump at the 2025 European Athletics U23 Championships
- Venue: Fana Stadion
- Location: Bergen, Norway
- Dates: 18 July (qualification); 20 July (final)
- Competitors: 29 from 20 nations
- Winning height: 2.30 m PB

Medalists
| gold medal | Matteo Sioli | Italy |
| silver medal | Mikolaj Szczesny | Poland |
| bronze medal | Melwin Lycke Holm | Sweden |

The men's high jump event at the 2025 European Athletics U23 Championships was held in Bergen, Norway, at Fana Stadion on 18 and 20 July.

== Records ==
Prior to the competition, the records were as follows:

| Record | Athlete (nation) | Height (m) | Location | Date |
|---|---|---|---|---|
| European U23 record | Patrik Sjöberg (SWE) | 2.42 m | Stockholm, Sweden | 30 June 1987 |
| Championship U23 record | Aleksander Waleriańczyk (POL) | 2.36 m | Bydgoszcz, Poland | 20 July 2003 |

== Results ==
=== Qualification ===
All athletes over 2.19 m (Q) or at least the 12 best performers (q) advance to the final.

==== Group A ====
| Place | Athlete | Nation | 1.95 | 2.00 | 2.05 | 2.09 | 2.13 | 2.16 | Result | Notes |
|---|---|---|---|---|---|---|---|---|---|---|
| 1 | Moustafa Diane | France | – | o | o | o | o | o | 2.16 m | q |
| 1 | Federico Celebrin | Italy | – | o | o | o | o | o | 2.16 m | q |
| 1 | Melwin Lycke Holm | Sweden | – | – | o | o | o | o | 2.16 m | q |
| 4 | Kimani Jack | Great Britain | – | – | o | o | o | xo | 2.16 m | q, SB |
| 4 | Kyrylo Lutsenko | Ukraine | – | o | o | o | o | xo | 2.16 m | q |
| 6 | Matyáš Čudlý | Czech Republic | xo | o | o | xxo | xxo | xxo | 2.16 m | q |
| 7 | Antrea Mita | Greece | – | – | xo | o | o | xxx | 2.13 m | |
| 8 | Loizos Chrysostomou | Cyprus | – | o | o | o | xxx | | 2.09 m | |
| 8 | Sandro Jeršin Tomassini | Slovenia | – | o | o | o | xxx | | 2.09 m | |
| 10 | David Bejinaru | Romania | – | o | xxo | xxx | | | 2.05 m | |
| 10 | Atilla Göktug Taşdelen | Turkey | o | o | xxo | xxx | | | 2.05 m | |
| 12 | Jérôme Hostettler | Switzerland | xo | o | xxx | | | | 2.00 m | |
| 13 | Artem Pikash | Ukraine | o | xo | xxx | | | | 2.00 m | |
| 14 | Alex Gábossy | Hungary | xxo | xxx | | | | | 1.95 m | |

==== Group B ====
| Place | Athlete | Nation | 1.95 | 2.00 | 2.05 | 2.09 | 2.13 | 2.16 | Result | Notes |
|---|---|---|---|---|---|---|---|---|---|---|
| 1 | Matteo Sioli | Italy | – | – | – | o | o | o | 2.16 m | q |
| 2 | Roman Petruk | Ukraine | – | – | o | o | xxo | o | 2.16 m | q, SB |
| 3 | Adam Tomášek | Czech Republic | – | o | o | o | o | xo | 2.16 m | q |
| 4 | David Gonzalez | Spain | – | o | o | o | xo | xo | 2.16 m | q |
| 5 | Edoardo Stronati | Italy | – | o | o | o | o | xxo | 2.16 m | q |
| 6 | Mikołaj Szczęsny | Poland | – | o | o | xo | o | xxo | 2.16 m | q |
| 7 | Michalis Christofi | Cyprus | – | o | o | o | o | xxx | 2.13 m | |
| 8 | Ignas Bitinas | Lithuania | o | o | o | o | xxo | xxx | 2.13 m | |
| 9 | Marko Šuković | Bosnia and Herzegovina | o | o | o | xo | xxo | xxx | 2.13 m | SB |
| 10 | Julien Pohl | Germany | – | o | – | xxo | x- | xx | 2.09 m | |
| 11 | Mátyás Guth | Hungary | o | o | o | xxx | | | 2.05 m | |
| 11 | Robert Ruffíni | Slovakia | o | o | o | xx- | x | | 2.05 m | |
| 11 | Ali Eren Ünlü | Turkey | – | o | o | xxx | | | 2.05 m | |
| 14 | Georgios Manolopoulos | Greece | o | o | xxo | xxx | | | 2.05 m | |
| 15 | Joel Riesen | Liechtenstein | o | xo | xxx | | | | 2.00 m | |

=== Final ===
| Place | Athlete | Nation | 2.05 | 2.09 | 2.13 | 2.16 | 2.19 | 2.22 | 2.24 | 2.26 | 2.28 | 2.30 | 2.33 | Result | Notes |
|---|---|---|---|---|---|---|---|---|---|---|---|---|---|---|---|
| 1st place, gold medalist(s) | Matteo Sioli | Italy | – | – | o | o | xo | xxo | xo | xo | o | xo | xxr | 2.30 m | PB |
| 2nd place, silver medalist(s) | Mikołaj Szczęsny | Poland | o | o | o | xo | o | xo | xxo | xxo | x- | xx | | 2.26 m | PB |
| 3rd place, bronze medalist(s) | Melwin Lycke Holm | Sweden | – | o | o | o | o | o | xxo | xxx | | | | 2.24 m | PB |
| 4 | Kyrylo Lutsenko | Ukraine | o | o | o | o | o | xxx | | | | | | 2.19 m | SB |
| 5 | Matyáš Čudlý | Czech Republic | o | o | xo | xo | xo | xxx | | | | | | 2.19 m | |
| 6 | Federico Celebrin | Italy | o | o | xxo | xo | xxo | xxx | | | | | | 2.19 m | |
| 7 | David Gonzalez | Spain | o | o | o | o | xxx | | | | | | | 2.16 m | |
| 8 | Kimani Jack | Great Britain | o | o | o | xo | xxx | | | | | | | 2.16 m | |
| 9 | Roman Petruk | Ukraine | – | o | o | xxo | x- | xx | | | | | | 2.16 m | =SB |
| 10 | Edoardo Stronati | Italy | – | o | – | xxx | | | | | | | | 2.09 m | |
| 10 | Adam Tomášek | Czech Republic | o | o | xxx | | | | | | | | | 2.09 m | |
| 12 | Moustafa Diane | France | xo | o | xxx | | | | | | | | | 2.09 m | |
