= 2019 Swedish Indoor Athletics Championships =

- Dates: 16–17 February 2019
- Host city: Norrköping, Sweden
- Venue: Stadium Arena
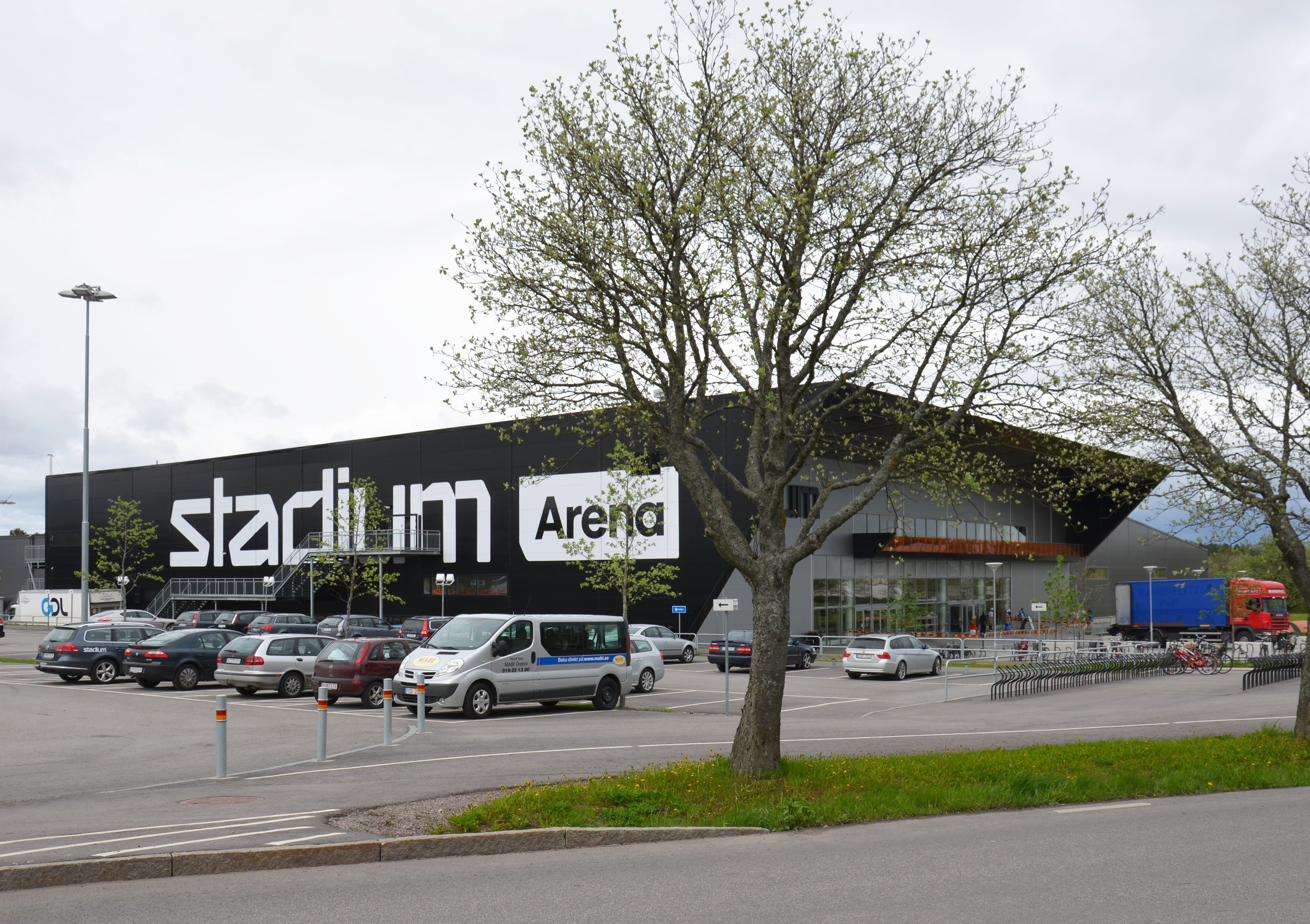

The 2019 Swedish Indoor Athletics Championships (Swedish: Svenska inomhusmästerskapen i friidrott 2019) was the 54th edition of the national championship in indoor track and field for Sweden. It was held on 16 and 17 February at the Stadium Arena in Norrköping.

The national indoor championship in combined track and field events was held separately on 12 and 13 February at the IFU Arena in Uppsala.

== Results ==
=== Men ===
Event	Gold		Silver		Bronze	
60 metres	Henrik Larsson; IF Göta	6.60	Austin Hamilton; Malmö AI	6.62	Odain Rose; Spårvägens FK	6.81
200 metres	Dennis Forsman; Hässelby SK	21.83	Emil Johansson; Turebergs FK	21.99	Anders Pihlblad; KFUM Örebro	22.05
400 metres	Carl Bengtström; Örgryte IS	47.96	Martin Selin; Ullevi FK	49.13	Joakim Karlsson; Ullevi FK	49.25
800 metres	Andreas Kramer; Sävedalens AIK	1:51.36	Efrem Brhane; Västerås FK	1:52.86	Robin Rohlén; IFK Umeå Friidrott	1:52.93
1500 metres	Jonas Leanderson; Malmö AI	3:56.56	Emil Danielsson; Spårvägens FK	3:57.77	Ali Al-Janabi; Ullevi FK	3:59.04
3000 metres	Jonas Leanderson; Malmö AI	8:04.43	Suldan Hassan; Ullevi FK	8:04.89	Robel Fsiha; Spårvägens FK	8:12.02
60 m hurdles	Anton Levin; Malmö AI	7.79	Fredrick Ekholm; IFK Lidingö	7.88	Alexander Brorsson; Athletics 24Seven SK	7.90
High jump	Andreas Carlsson; IK Ymer	2.10 m	Simon Wiklund; IK Wilske	2.07 m	Adam Chiguer; Spårvägens FK	2.07 m
Pole vault	Melker Svärd Jacobsson; Örgryte IS	5.15 m	Carl Sténson; Hellas FK	5.03 m	Simon Thor; IFK Märsta	4.95 m
Long jump	Thobias Nilsson Montler; Malmö AI	7.94 m	Andreas Otterling; IFK Lidingö	7.79 m	Michel Tornéus; Hammarby IF	7.76 m
Triple jump	Jesper Hellström; Hässelby SK	15.89 m	Artur Engström; Örgryte IS	15.26 m	Erik Ehrlin; Hammarby IF	15.26 m
Shot put	Wictor Petersson; Malmö AI	19.70 m	Niklas Arrhenius; Spårvägens FK	18.20 m	Gabriel Heen; Hässelby SK	17.90 m
Weight throw	Ragnar Carlsson; Falu IK	21.00 m	Elias Håkansson; Spårvägens FK	20.53 m	Robert Alneroth; Gefle IF Friidrott	19.44 m
Heptathlon	Fredrik Samuelsson; Hässelby SK	6018 pts	Andreas Gustafsson; Falu IK	5377 pts	Kevin Frankl; Athletics 24Seven	5312 pts

=== Women ===
Event	Gold		Silver		Bronze	
60 metres	Iréne Ekelund; Spårvägens FK	7.29	Elin Östlund; KFUM Örebro	7.43	Jessica Östlund; Hässelby SK	7.45
200 metres	Lisa Lilja; Ullevi FK	23.91	Moa Hjelmer; Spårvägens FK	23.97	Daniella Busk; Malmö AI	24.47
400 metres	Matilda Hellqvist; Ullevi FK	54.03	Moa Hjelmer; Spårvägens FK	54.42	Elise Malmberg; Hässleholms AIS	55.07
800 metres	Lovisa Lindh; Ullevi FK	2:10.96	Anna Silvander; IFK Lidingö	2:11.51	Sofia Öberg; IFK Lidingö	2:11.90
1500 metres	Yolanda Ngarambe; Turebergs FK	4:21.39	Linn Söderholm; Sävedalens AIK	4:25.66	Fanny Dusabimana; Umeå TFC	4:27.32
3000 metres	Lisa Havell; Spårvägens FK	9:25.58	Sanna Mustonen; Hässelby SK	9:32.77	Cecilia Norrbom; Spårvägens FK	9:33.04
60 m hurdles	Tilde Johansson; Falkenbergs IK	8.17	Emma Tuvesson; Spårvägens FK	8.30	Lovisa Karlsson; Högby IF	8.37
High jump	Sofie Skoog; IF Göta	1.90 m	Bianca Salming; Turebergs FK	1.90 m	Erika Kinsey; Trångsvikens IF	1.88 m
Pole vault	Angelica Bengtsson; Hässelby SK	4.60 m	Michaela Meijer; Örgryte IS	4.50 m	Hanna Jansson; Ullevi FK	4.15 m
Long jump	Tilde Johansson; Falkenbergs IK	6.43 m	Erika Kinsey; Trångsvikens IF	6.33 m	Kaiza Karlén; IF Göta	6.28 m
Triple jump	Maja Åskag; Råby-Rekarne FIF	13.25 m	Emelie Nyman Wänseth; Östersunds GIF	13.16 m	Malin Marmbrandt; Västerås FK	13.13 m
Shot put	Fanny Roos; Athletics 24Seven SK	18.61 m	Frida Åkerström; Hässelby SK	16.63 m	Ásdís Hjálmsdóttir (ISL); Spårvägens FK	15.77 m
Weight throw	Ida Storm; Malmö AI	23.53 m	Tracey Andersson; Ullevi FK	20.25 m	Grete Ahlberg; Hammarby IF	19.52 m
Pentathlon	Tilde Johansson; Falkenbergs IK	4201 pts	Lovisa Östervall; Upsala IF Friidrott	4081 pts	Lovisa Karlsson; Högby IF	4005 pts
