= Melwin Lycke Holm =

Swedish high jumper (born 2004)

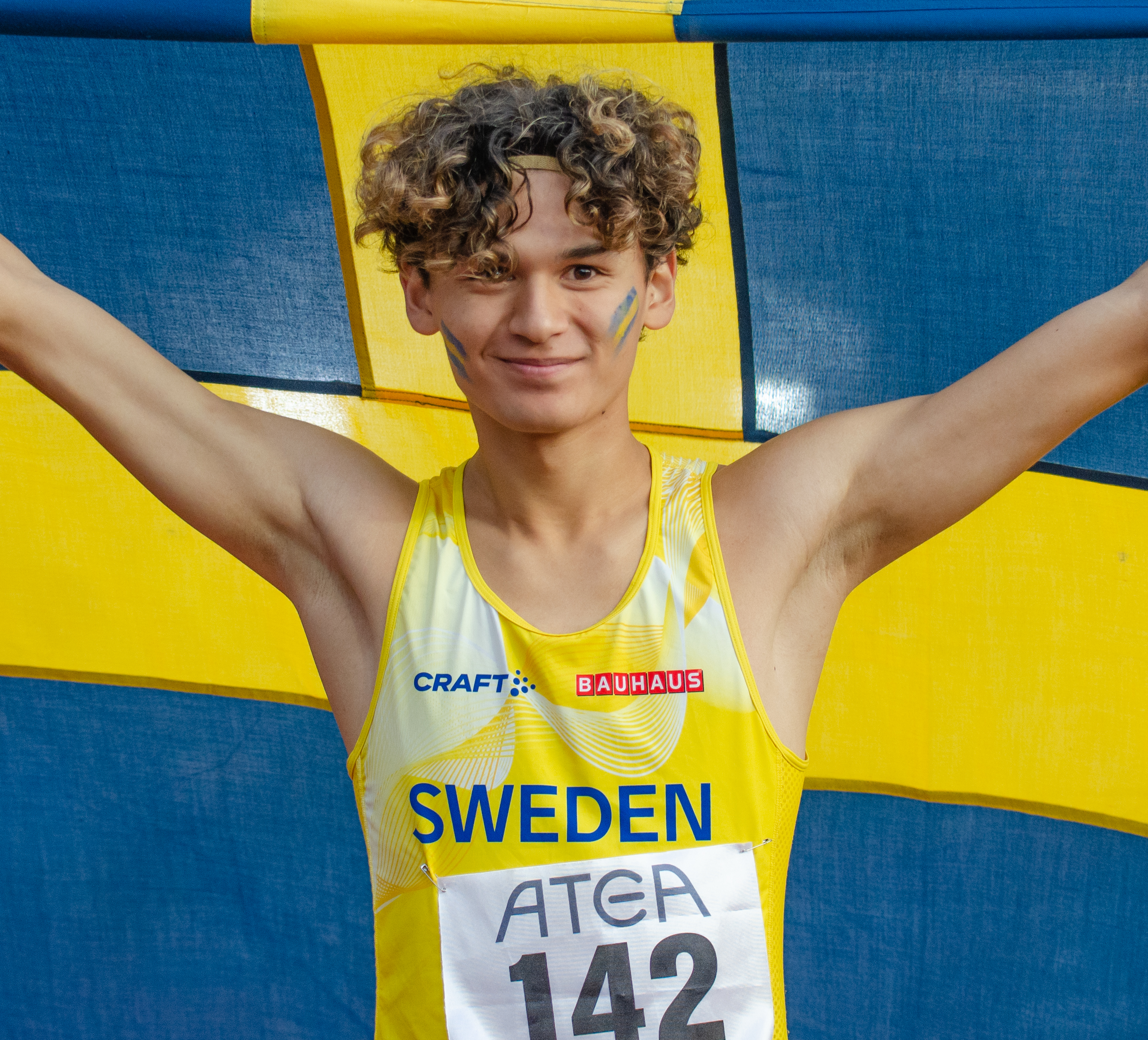
- Lycke Holm at the 2023 Finnkampen

Personal information
- Nationality: Sweden
- Born: 12 October 2004 (age 21)
- Home town: Kil
- Parent: Stefan Holm (father)

Sport
- Sport: Athletics
- Events: High jump Long jump
- Club: Kils AIK

Achievements and titles
- National finals: 2019 Swedish Indoors; • High jump, 4th; 2019 Swedish Indoor U16s; • High jump, 1st (gold); • Long jump, 1st (gold); • Triple jump, 1st (gold); 2019 Swedish U16s; • High jump, 1st (gold); • Long jump, 1st (gold); • Triple jump, 1st (gold); 2019 Swedish Champs; • High jump, 3rd (bronze); 2020 Swedish Indoors; • High jump, 2nd (silver); 2020 Swedish Indoor U17s; • Long jump, 1st (gold); • High jump, 1st (gold); • Triple jump, 1st (gold); 2020 Swedish Champs; • High jump, 1st (gold); 2020 Swedish U17s; • Long jump, 1st (gold); • High jump, 1st (gold); • Triple jump, 1st (gold); 2021 Swedish Indoors; • High jump, 5th; • Long jump, 14th; 2021 Swedish U18s; • High jump, 1st (gold); 2021 Swedish U18s; • Long jump, 7.03; 2021 Swedish U18s; • Long jump, 1st (gold); 2021 Swedish U18s; • Triple jump, 14.11; 2021 Swedish U18s; • Triple jump, 3rd (bronze); 2021 Swedish Champs; • High jump, 4th; 2022 Swedish Indoors; • High jump, 1st (gold); 2022 Swedish Indoor U20s; • Long jump, 2nd (silver); • High jump, 1st (gold); • Triple jump, 1st (gold); 2022 Swedish Champs; • High jump, 1st (gold); 2022 Swedish U20s; • High jump, 1st (gold); • Long jump, 2nd (silver); • Triple jump, 1st (gold); 2023 Swedish Indoors; • High jump, 1st (gold); 2023 Swedish Indoor U20s; • High jump, 1st (gold); • Triple jump, 1st (gold); • Long jump, 3rd (bronze); 2023 Swedish Champs; • High jump, 1st (gold); 2023 Swedish U20s; • High jump, 1st (gold); • Long jump, 1st (gold); • Triple jump, 2nd (silver)
- Personal bests: HJ: 2.24 m (2025); LJ: 7.79 m (2025)
Medal record
Men's athletics
Representing Sweden
European U23 Championships
Bronze medal – third place	2025 Bergen	High jump
European U20 Championships
Gold medal – first place	2023 Jerusalem	High jump
Nordic Championships
Gold medal – first place	2023 Copenhagen	High jump
- Updated on 2 August 2025

Melwin Lycke Holm (born 12 October 2004) is a Swedish high jumper and long jumper. He won a gold medal in the high jump at the 2023 European U20 Championships and a bronze medal in the same event at the 2025 European U23 Championships. He is the son of Olympic gold medallist Stefan Holm.

== Career ==
Lycke Holm has been competitive in the high jump from a very young age, as he jumped 1.87 metres at age 12 in 2017 to break the single-age world record. His father had not achieved that mark until he was two years older, at age 14 at the 1991 Swedish Indoor Championships. Later that year, he improved to 1.97 metres indoors. On account of his father, Lycke Holm's youth career was covered extensively by the Swedish press.

However, Lycke Holm did not compete outside the Nordic countries until 2021, and his first continental championship came in 2023 at the European U20 Championships in Jerusalem. At the championships, he was closely matched by the favorite Edoardo Stronati, and both did not clear past 2.18 metres. As the final heights were a tie, the competition had to be decided on countback, and Lycke Holm's first-time clearance at 2.18 m earned him the gold medal.

== Personal life ==
Lycke Holm is the son of Stefan Holm, Olympic high jump gold medallist. He trains with the Kils AIK athletics club in Kil.

Lycke Holm has tried to carve his own path distinct from his father, as he jumps from a different foot than his father and has goals of surpassing his achievements.

== Statistics ==
=== Personal best progression ===
High Jump progression
#	Mark	Pl.	Competition	Venue	Date	Ref
1	1.63 m	1st place, gold medalist(s)		Kil, Sweden	27 Aug 2016	
2	1.80 m	1st place, gold medalist(s)	Karlstad	Karlstad, Sweden	25 Nov 2016	
3	1.87 m	(gold) (U13)	Gothenburg Youth Games	Gothenburg, Sweden	30 Jun 2017	
4	1.89 m	1st place, gold medalist(s)	Gävle	Gävle, Sweden	8 Sep 2017	
5	1.97 m	1st place, gold medalist(s)	Karlstad	Karlstad, Sweden	24 Nov 2017	
6	1.98 m	1st place, gold medalist(s)	Göteborgs Inomhus	Göteborg, Sweden	2 Feb 2018	
7	2.00 m	1st place, gold medalist(s)	Gothenburg Youth Games	Göteborg, Sweden	30 Jun 2018	
8	2.01 m	1st place, gold medalist(s)	Skarakampen	Skara, Sweden	18 Aug 2018	
9	2.04 m	1st place, gold medalist(s)		Trollbäcken, Sweden	14 Sep 2018	
10	2.05 m	1st place, gold medalist(s)	Stjärnspelen	Arvika, Sweden	26 Jul 2019	
11	2.09 m	3rd place, bronze medalist(s)	Swedish Athletics Championships	Karlstad, Sweden	30 Aug 2019	
12	2.13 m	1st place, gold medalist(s)	Nordic Indoor Athletics Match	Helsinki, Finland	8 Feb 2020	
13	2.17 m	1st place, gold medalist(s)	Landslagsutmaningen	Söderhamn, Sweden	7 Aug 2020	
14	2.18 m	1st place, gold medalist(s)	Swedish U20 Championships	Skellefteå, Sweden	5 Mar 2022	

Long Jump progression
#	Mark	Pl.	Competition	Venue	Date	Ref.
1	6.89 m	1st place, gold medalist(s)		Trollbäcken, Sweden	15 Sep 2018	
2	7.04 m	1st place, gold medalist(s)		Karlstad, Sweden	25 Jan 2019	
3	7.11 m	1st place, gold medalist(s)	USM15-16	Trollhättan, Sweden	9 Aug 2019	
4	7.17 m	2nd place, silver medalist(s)	Mälarspelen	Eskilstuna, Sweden	26 Jun 2020	
5	7.20 m	1st place, gold medalist(s)	USM15-16 Hopp	Sollentuna, Sweden	21 Aug 2020	
6	7.37 m	1st place, gold medalist(s)	Goliatspelen	Kil, Sweden	12 Aug 2022	
7	7.38 m	1st place, gold medalist(s)	Örebro Indoor Games och IDM	Örebro, Sweden	14 Jan 2023	
8	7.42 m	1st place, gold medalist(s)	Täby Vinterspel	Sätra, Sweden	20 Jan 2023	
9	7.45 m	1st place, gold medalist(s)	Folksam GP	Sätra, Sweden	28 Jan 2023	
10	7.51 m	1st place, gold medalist(s)	Nordic U20 Match	Oslo, Norway	22 Jul 2023	
