= Ato Ibáñez =

Swedish racewalker (born 1985)

Anatole Ibáñez
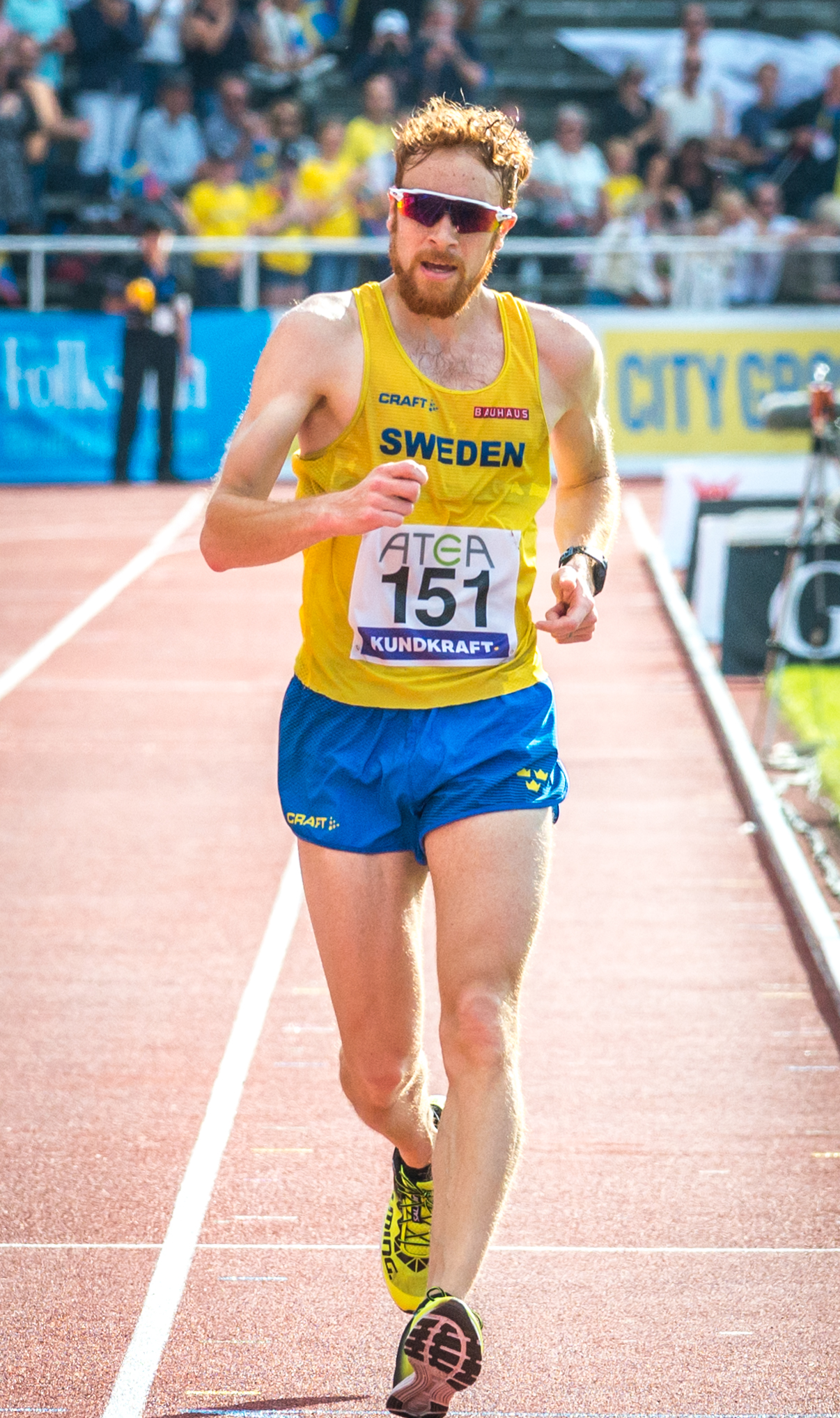
- Ato Ibáñez during the Finland-Sweden athletics international 2019 at the Stockholm Stadium in August 2019.

Personal information
- Born: 14 November 1985 (age 40)

Sport
- Country: Sweden
- Sport: Track and field
- Event: racewalking
- Updated on 29 August 2015

Andreas Enrique Anatole Vera Ibáñez (born 14 November 1985) is a male Swedish racewalker. He has represented his country at the World Championships in Athletics on four occasions, from 2011 to 2017. He walked for Sweden at the IAAF World Race Walking Team Championships seven times consecutively from 2004 to 2016. He also competed at the European Athletics Championships in 2010, 2014 and 2018.

He competed in the 50 kilometres walk event at the 2015 World Championships in Athletics in Beijing, China, but did not finish.

Born in Öja, Gotland, he is the son of two international racewalkers: Mexican Enrique Vera Ibáñez and Swede Siv Gustavsson. His brother, Perseus Karlström, is also an international racewalker for Sweden.

== National titles ==
- Swedish Indoor Athletics Championships
  - 5000 m walk: 2019

== See also ==
- Sweden at the 2015 World Championships in Athletics
