= Lisa Lilja =

Swedish sprinter (born 1996)

Personal information
- Nationality: Sweden
- Born: 22 November 1996 (29 years, 253 days old)

Sport
- Sport: Athletics
- Events: 400 metres 200 metres
- College team: Keiser Seahawks
- Club: Örgryte IS; Ullevi FK
- Coached by: Erik Olsson

Achievements and titles
- National finals: 2015 Swedish Indoors; • 200 m, 4th; 2015 Swedish Indoor U20s; • 60 m, 3rd (bronze); 2015 Swedish U20s; • 100 m, 4th; • 200 m, 6th; 2016 Swedish U23s; • 4 × 100 m, 1st (gold); 2016 Swedish U23s; • 100 m, 6th; • 200 m, 3rd (bronze); 2017 Swedish U23s; • 100 m, 4th; • 200 m, 4th; 2018 Swedish Indoor U23s; • 60 m, 2nd (silver); • 400 m, 3rd (bronze); 2018 Swedish Champs; • 4 × 100 m, 3rd (bronze); 2018 Swedish U23s; • 3 × 400 m, 2nd (silver); 2018 Swedish Champs; • 4 × 400 m, 1st (gold); 2018 Swedish U23s; • 100 m, 3rd (bronze); • 200 m, 1st (gold); • 200 m, 1st (gold); 2018 Swedish Champs; • 200 m, 1st (gold); 2019 Swedish Indoors; • 200 m, 1st (gold); 2019 Swedish Champs; • 4 × 100 m, 1st (gold); • 4 × 400 m, 1st (gold); 2020 Swedish Indoors; • 200 m, 2nd (silver); 2020 Swedish Champs; • 200 m, 2nd (silver); 2020 Swedish Champs; • 4 × 100 m, 2nd (silver); 2021 Swedish Indoors; • 200 m, 4th; 2021 Swedish Champs; • 4 × 100 m, 2nd (silver); • 4 × 400 m, 1st (gold); 2021 Swedish Champs; • 200 m, 4th; 2022 Swedish Indoors; • 200 m, 1st (gold); 2022 Swedish Champs; • 100 m, 4th; • 200 m, 1st (gold); 2023 Swedish Champs; • 400 m, 1st (gold); • 200 m, 3rd (bronze)
- Personal bests: 200 m: 23.14 (+1.6) (2022); 400 m: 52.73 (2023)
Medal record
Women's athletics
Representing Sweden
Nordic Championships
Bronze medal – third place	2023 Copenhagen	200 m
- Updated on 24 December 2023

Lisa Lilja (born 22 November 1996) is a Swedish sprinter specializing in the 200 metres and 400 metres. She is a three-time Swedish Athletics Championships winner and two-time Swedish Indoor Athletics Championships titleholder.

== Biography ==
Lilja was initially an association football player for IF Limhamn Bunkeflo, but in 2015 she switched to the sport of athletics and the following year she moved to the United States with her boyfriend Thobias Montler, a Swedish long jumper.

Lilja and Montler joined the Keiser Seahawks track and field team in West Palm Beach, Florida in 2016, competing in the National Association of Intercollegiate Athletics (NAIA).

At the 2018 Swedish Athletics Championships, Lilja won her first senior national title in the 200 metres, which she then backed up by winning the 2019 Swedish Indoor Athletics Championships the following year.

In 2023, Lilja switched her club from Örgryte IS to Ullevi FK under new coach Erik Olsson (coach of Carl Bengtström), to focus primarily on the 400 metres instead of the 100 and 200 metres she had previously specialized in. The switch was successful, as she won the 2023 Swedish championships later that season.

== Statistics ==
=== Personal bests ===
Event	Mark	Place	Competition	Venue	Date
200 metres	23.14 (+1.6 m/s)	1st place, gold medalist(s)	Swedish Athletics Championships	Norrköping, Sweden	7 August 2022
400 metres	52.73	1st place, gold medalist(s)	Swedish Athletics Championships	Söderhamn, Sweden	29 July 2023
