= Jesper Hellström =

Swedish triple jumper (born 1995)

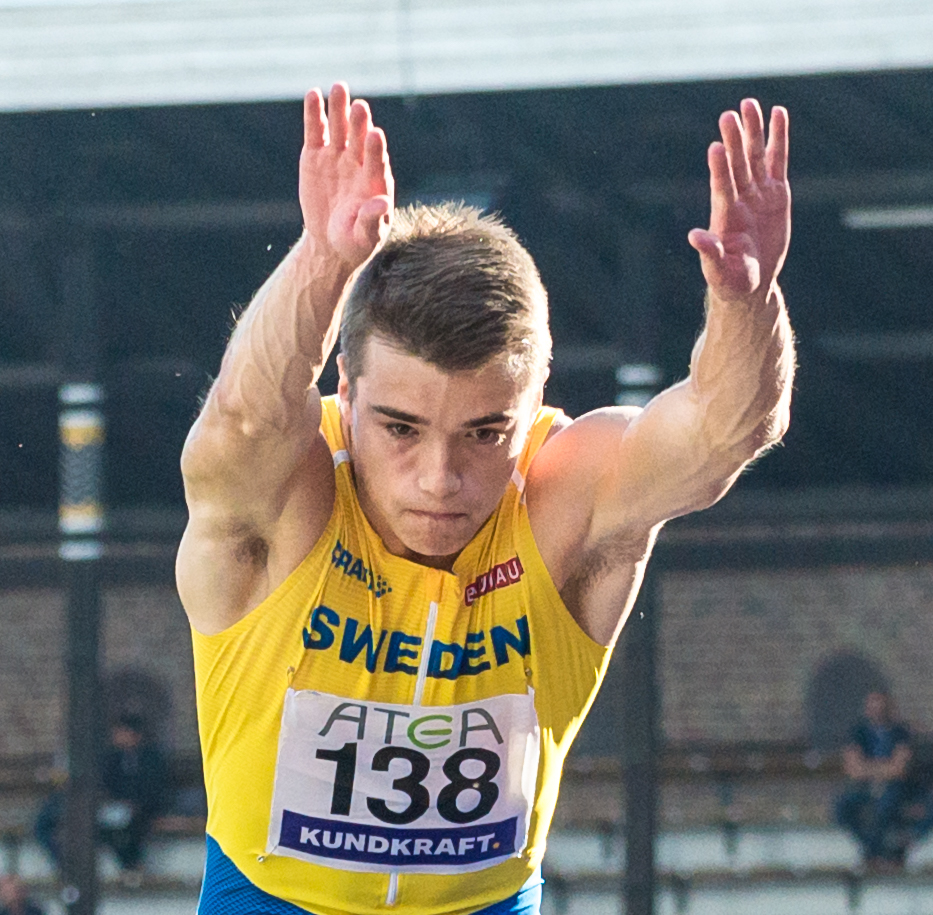
- Hellström at the 2019 Finland-Sweden Athletics International

Personal information
- Nationality: Sweden
- Born: 27 July 1995 (31 years, 6 days old)

Sport
- Sport: Athletics
- Events: Triple jump Long jump

Achievements and titles
- National finals: 2010 Swedish U16s; • 4 × 100 m, DNF; 2010 Swedish U16s; • Triple jump, 9th; 2011 Swedish Indoor U17s; • Long jump, 19th; • Triple jump, 8th; 2012 Swedish Indoor U18s; • Triple jump, 5th; • Long jump, 11th; 2012 Swedish U18s; • Long jump, 4th; 2012 Swedish U18s; • Long jump, 6.18; 2012 Swedish U18s; • Triple jump, 3rd (bronze); 2012 Swedish U18s; • Swedish relay, 3rd (bronze); 2012 Swedish U18s; • U18 decathlon, 9th; 2013 Swedish Indoor U20s; • Triple jump, 2nd (silver); • Long jump, 16th; 2013 Swedish U20s; • Swedish relay, 4th; • 4 × 100 m, 6th; 2014 Swedish Indoor U20s; • Triple jump, 1st (gold); • Long jump, 12th; 2014 Swedish Indoors; • Triple jump, 6th; 2014 Swedish U20s; • Swedish relay, 2nd (silver); • 4 × 100 m, 4th; 2014 Swedish Champs; • Long jump, 11th; • Triple jump, 7th; 2014 Swedish U20s; • Triple jump, 3rd (bronze); 2015 Swedish Indoors; • Triple jump, 5th; • Long jump, 12th; 2015 Swedish Indoor U23s; • Long jump, 4th; 2015 Swedish Indoor U23s; • Triple jump, 1st (gold); 2015 Swedish Champs; • Triple jump, 5th; 2015 Swedish U23s; • Long jump, 4th; • Triple jump, 1st (gold); 2015 Swedish U23s; • Triple jump, 14.77; 2016 Swedish Indoor U23s; • Long jump, 5th; • Triple jump, 1st (gold); 2016 Swedish Indoors; • Triple jump, 5th; • Long jump, 9th; 2016 Swedish U23s; • Long jump, 5th; • Triple jump, 2nd (silver); 2016 Swedish U23s; • Triple jump, 14.43; 2016 Swedish Champs; • Long jump, 5th; • Triple jump, 11th; 2017 Swedish Indoor U23s; • Long jump, 1st (gold); • Triple jump, 1st (gold); 2017 Swedish Indoors; • Triple jump, 3rd (bronze); • Long jump, 4th; 2017 Swedish U23s; • 4 × 100 m, 4th; 2017 Swedish U23s; • Triple jump, 1st (gold); • Long jump, 4th; 2017 Swedish Champs; • Long jump, 7th; • Triple jump, 9th; 2018 Swedish Indoors; • Triple jump, 1st (gold); • Long jump, 7th; 2019 Swedish Indoors; • Triple jump, 1st (gold); • Long jump, 5th; 2019 Swedish Champs; • Triple jump, 1st (gold); 2020 Swedish Indoors; • Triple jump, 1st (gold); • Long jump, 2nd (silver); 2020 Swedish Champs; • Triple jump, 1st (gold); • Long jump, 5th; 2021 Swedish Indoors; • Triple jump, 1st (gold); • Long jump, 2nd (silver); 2022 Swedish Indoors; • Triple jump, 2nd (silver); • Long jump, 5th; 2022 Swedish Champs; • Long jump, 2nd (silver); 2023 Swedish Indoors; • Triple jump, 1st (gold); • Long jump, 2nd (silver); 2023 Swedish Champs; • Long jump, 6th; • Triple jump, 2nd (silver)
- Personal bests: TJ: 16.71m (+0.5) (2019); LJ: 7.57m (+1.6) (2022)
- Updated on 15 December 2023

Jesper Hellström (born 27 July 1995) is a Swedish long and triple jumper. He is a seven-time national champion in the triple jump.

== Career ==
Jesper Hellström first gained international experience in 2017 when he competed in the long jump at the 2017 European Athletics U23 Championships in Bydgoszcz, finishing ninth with a jump of 7.49 m. In 2021, he competed in the triple jump at the 2021 European Athletics Indoor Championships in Toruń, where he achieved sixth place with a jump of 16.45 m. The following year, he placed tenth at the 2022 European Athletics Championships in München with a jump of 16.23 m, and in 2023, he missed qualifying for the final at the 2023 European Athletics Indoor Championships in Istanbul with a jump of 15.95 m.

In 2019 and 2020, Hellström was the Swedish Athletics Championships winner in the outdoor triple jump, and from 2018 to 2021 and again in 2023, he also won Swedish Athletics Indoor Championships individual titles.

== Personal life ==
Hellström also has other hobbies such as disc golf, fishing, and video gaming. In the javelin throw, he recorded a mark over 40 metres without any javelin-specific training.

At the 2022 European Athletics Championships, a clip of Hellström aborting a jump by flipping while smiling became a viral video.

== Statistics ==
=== Personal bests ===
Event	Mark	Place	Competition	Venue	Date
Triple jump	16.71 m (+0.5 m/s)	1st place, gold medalist(s)	Finland-Sweden Athletics International	Stockholm, Sweden	24 August 2019
Long jump	7.57 m (+1.6 m/s)	1st place, gold medalist(s)	Swedish Athletics Club Championships	Uppsala, Sweden	21 June 2022
