= Emil Johansson (sprinter) =

Swedish sprinter (born 2002)

Personal information
- Nationality: Sweden
- Born: 10 June 2002 (24 years, 53 days old)
- Home town: Bollstanäs, Upplands Väsby, Sweden

Sport
- Sport: Athletics
- Events: 400 metres 200 metres
- Club: Turebergs FK

Achievements and titles
- National finals: 2017 Swedish U18s; • 4 × 100 m, 8th; 2017 Swedish U16s; • 80 m, 1st (gold); • High jump, 6th; • 300 m, 1st (gold); 2018 Swedish Indoor U17s; • 60 m, 2nd (silver); • 400 m, 1st (gold); 2018 Swedish U18s; • Swedish relay, 6th; 2018 Swedish U17s; • 100 m, 3rd (bronze); • 400 m, 1st (gold); • 200 m, 3rd (bronze); 2018 Swedish Champs; • 400 m, 8th; 2019 Swedish Indoors; • 200 m, 2nd (silver); 2019 Swedish Indoor U18s; • 60 m, 2nd (silver); • 400 m, 1st (gold); 2019 Swedish U18s; • Swedish relay, 6th; • 4 × 100 m, 3rd (bronze); 2019 Swedish U18s; • 100 m, 2nd (silver); • 200 m, 1st (gold); 2019 Swedish Champs; • 400 m, 3rd (bronze); 2020 Swedish Indoors; • 400 m, 1st (gold); 2020 Swedish Indoor U20s; • 60 m, 3rd (bronze); 2020 Swedish Champs; • 400 m, 2nd (silver); 2020 Swedish U20s; • 100 m, 2nd (silver); • 400 m, 1st (gold); 2020 Swedish U23s; • 3 × 400 m, 1st (gold); 2020 Swedish Champs; • 4 × 400 m, 4th; 2021 Swedish Indoors; • 200 m, 2nd (silver); • 400 m, 2nd (silver); 2021 Swedish U20s; • Swedish relay, DNF; • 4 × 100 m, 4th; 2021 Swedish Champs; • 4 × 400 m, 5th; 2021 Swedish U20s; • 100 m, 2nd (silver); • 400 m, 1st (gold); • 200 m, 1st (gold); 2021 Swedish Champs; • 400 m, 2nd (silver); • 200 m, 6th; 2022 Swedish Champs; • 4 × 400 m, 5th; 2022 Swedish Champs; • 400 m, 7th; 2022 Swedish U23s; • 100 m, 3rd (bronze); • 200 m, 2nd (silver); 2023 Swedish Indoors; • 400 m, 2nd (silver); 2023 Swedish Indoor U23s; • 60 m, 4th; • 400 m, 1st (gold); 2023 Swedish Champs; • 400 m, 2nd (silver); • 200 m, 3rd (bronze); 2023 Swedish U23s; • 100 m, 2nd (silver); • 200 m, 1st (gold); 2023 Swedish U23s; • 3 × 400 m, 1st (gold); 2023 Swedish Champs; • 4 × 400 m, 3rd (bronze)
- Personal bests: 400 m: 46.43 (2023); 200 m: 21.13 (-0.9) (2023)
Medal record
Men's athletics
Representing Sweden
European Youth Olympic Festival
Gold medal – first place	2019 Baku	400 m
Silver medal – second place	2019 Baku	4 × 400 m relay
Nordic Championships
Gold medal – first place	2023 Copenhagen	4 × 100 m relay
Gold medal – first place	2023 Copenhagen	4 × 400 m relay
- Updated on 16 December 2023

Emil Johansson (born 10 June 2002) is a Swedish sprinter. He was the 2020 Swedish Indoor Athletics Championships winner in the 400 metres.

== Biography ==
After achieving the fastest mark at the trials, Johannson earned his first international medals at the 2019 European Youth Olympic Festival. He won a gold in the individual 400 metres, and a silver medal running the 300 metres leg of the Swedish medley relay.

In 2020, Johansson achieved his first national title by winning the 2020 Swedish Indoor Athletics Championships. Outdoors, he won the Finnkampen in a personal best of 46.95 seconds.

In 2023, Johansson was a member of the Swedish record-breaking team in the mixed 4 × 400 metres relay. The following week, he won the Swedish BAUHAUS-galan trials in the 400 metres. The time was a personal best of 46.69 seconds, his first time improvement in three years.

Johannson is from Bollstanäs, Upplands Väsby and he competes for the Turebergs FK athletics club.

== Statistics ==
=== Personal bests ===
Event	Mark	Place	Competition	Venue	Date
400 metres	46.43	2nd place, silver medalist(s)	Swedish Athletics Championships	Söderhamn, Sweden	29 July 2023
200 metres	21.13 (-0.9 m/s)	1st place, gold medalist(s)	Swedish Athletics Team Championships	Fredrikstad, Norway	8 July 2023
