= 2026 European Athletics Championships – Men's high jump =

Men's high jump at the 2026 European Athletics Championships
- Venue: Alexander Stadium
- Location: Birmingham, United Kingdom
- Dates: 11 August 2026 (qualification); 14 August 2026 (final)
- Competitors: 26 from 15 nations
- Winning height: 2.32 m SB

Medalists
gold medal	Gianmarco Tamberi	Italy
silver medal	Oleh Doroshchuk	Ukraine
bronze medal	Matteo Sioli	Italy

The men's high jump at the 2026 European Athletics Championships took place over two rounds at the Alexander Stadium in Birmingham, United Kingdom, on 11 and 14 August 2026.

== Background ==
Records before the 2026 European Athletics Championships
Record	Athlete (nation)	Height	Location	Date
World record	Javier Sotomayor (CUB)	2.45 m	Salamanca, Spain	27 July 1993
European record	Patrik Sjöberg (SWE)	2.42 m	Stockholm, Sweden	30 July 1987
European record	Carlo Thränhardt (FRG)	2.42 m	West Berlin, West Germany	26 February 1988
European record	Bohdan Bondarenko (UKR)	2.42 m	New York City, United States	14 June 2014
Championship record	Gianmarco Tamberi (ITA)	2.37 m	Rome, Italy	11 June 2024
World leading	JuVaughn Harrison (USA)	2.34 m	Fontvieille, Monaco	5 August 2026
European leading	Danil Lysenko (RUS)	2.33 m	Chelyabinsk, Russia	16 January 2026
European leading	Oleh Doroshchuk (UKR)	2.33 m	Berdichev, Ukraine	27 June 2026

== Qualification ==
For the men's high jump, the qualification period was from 27 July 2025 to 26 July 2026. Athletes qualified by achieving the entry standard of 2.27 m or better, by wildcard for the 2024 European Athletics Champion, or by their position on the World Athletics Rankings for the event. The target number was 30 athletes; eventually 27 qualified.

Qualification standings per 31 July 2026
QP	CP	Country	Athlete	Status	Details
1	1	Italy	Gianmarco Tamberi	Qualified by Wild Card	Defending European Champion
2	1	Ukraine	Oleh Doroshchuk	Qualified by Entry Standard	2.33 - Berdichev (UKR) - 27 JUN 2026
3	1	Czech Republic	Jan Štefela	Qualified by Entry Standard	2.32 - Športová hala Dukla, Banská Bystrica (SVK) (i) - 24 FEB 2026
4	1	Great Britain & N.I.	Kimani Jack	Qualified by Entry Standard	2.31 - Spec Towns Track, Athens, GA (USA) - 02 MAY 2026
5	1	Poland	Mateusz Kołodziejski	Qualified by Entry Standard	2.30 - Městská sportovní hala, Hustopeče (CZE) (i) - 07 FEB 2026
6	2	Italy	Christian Falocchi	Qualified by Entry Standard	2.30 - Palaindoor Ancona, Ancona (ITA) (i) - 01 MAR 2026
7	2	Ukraine	Roman Petruk	Qualified by Entry Standard	2.30 - Stadion SKIF, Lviv (UKR) - 06 JUN 2026
8	1	Germany	Tobias Potye	Qualified by Entry Standard	2.30 - Kennedyplatz, Essen (GER) - 20 JUN 2026
9	3	Italy	Matteo Sioli	Qualified by Entry Standard	2.30 - Stadio Luigi Ridolfi, Firenze (ITA) - 26 JUL 2026
10	1	Lithuania	Juozas Baikštys	Qualified by Entry Standard	2.27 - Athletics Stadium, Beograd (SRB) - 07 AUG 2025
11	1	Greece	Antonios Merlos	Qualified by Entry Standard	2.27 - Arena Gorzów, Gorzów Wielkopolski (POL) (i) - 31 JAN 2026
12	2	Great Britain & N.I.	Joel Clarke-Khan	Qualified by Entry Standard	2.27 - Alexander Stadium, Birmingham (GBR) - 20 JUN 2026
13	4	Italy	Edoardo Stronati	Qualified by Entry Standard	2.27 - Stadio Luigi Ridolfi, Firenze (ITA) - 26 JUL 2026
14	1	Belgium	Thomas Carmoy	Qualified by World Rankings	8th - 1196 points
15	3	Ukraine	Dmytro Nikitin	Qualified by World Rankings	14th - 1161 points
16	1	Israel	Jonathan Kapitolnik	Qualified by World Rankings	16th - 1157 points
reserve	5	Italy	Manuel Lando	Qualified by World Rankings	17th - 1154 points
17	2	Germany	Falk Wendrich	Qualified by World Rankings	21st - 1142 points
18	1	Sweden	Melwin Lycke Holm	Qualified by World Rankings	26th - 1128 points
19	2	Greece	Antrea Mita	Qualified by World Rankings	27th - 1128 points
20	2	Poland	Mikołaj Szczęsny	Qualified by World Rankings	30th - 1124 points
21	2	Belgium	Jef Vermeiren	Qualified by World Rankings	31st - 1123 points
reserve	6	Italy	Federico Celebrin	Qualified by World Rankings	37th - 1111 points
22	1	Finland	Daniel Kosonen	Qualified by World Rankings	39th - 1104 points
23	2	Czech Republic	Marek BahnÍk	Qualified by World Rankings	40th - 1102 points
24	1	Norway	Erlend Bolstad Raa	Qualified by World Rankings	41st - 1101 points
25	3	Czech Republic	Matyáš Čudlý	Qualified by World Rankings	44th - 1090 points
reserve	4	Czech Republic	Adam Tomášek	Qualified by World Rankings	47th - 1083 points
26	1	Romania	Valentin Alexandru Androne	Qualified by World Rankings	49th - 1081 points
27	1	Cyprus	Loizos Chrysostomou	Qualified by World Rankings	53rd - 1074 points

Bye to semi-finals	Reserve activated	Withdrawal / reserve unused

== Schedule ==
Date	Time	Round
11 August 2026	10:33	Qualification
14 August 2026	20:00	Final

All times are local times (UTC+1)

== Results ==
=== Qualification ===
The qualification round was held on 11 August 2026, at 10:43 in the morning. All athletes meeting the Qualification Standard (Q) of 2.26 m or at least 12 best performers (q) advanced to the final.

==== Group A ====
Place	Athlete	Nation	2.10	2.15	2.19	2.23	Result	Notes
1	Kimani Jack	Great Britain & N.I.	o	o	o	o	2.23 m	q
2	Jonathan Kapitolnik	Israel	o	o	xo	o	2.23 m	q, =SB
3	Thomas Carmoy	Belgium	xo	xo	xxo	xxo	2.23 m	q, SB
4	Edoardo Stronati	Italy	o	o	o	xxx	2.19 m	q
5	Christian Falocchi	Italy	o	xxo	o	xxx	2.19 m	q
5	Antrea Mita	Greece	o	xxo	o	xxx	2.19 m	q
7	Melwin Lycke Holm	Sweden	o	o	xo	xxx	2.19 m	
7	Jan Štefela	Czech Republic	-	o	xo	xxx	2.19 m	
9	Mikołaj Szczęsny	Poland	xo	xxo	xxo	xxx	2.19 m	
10	Daniel Kosonen	Finland	xxo	xo	xxx		2.15 m	
11	Roman Petruk	Ukraine	o	xxx			2.10 m	
—	Marek Bahník	Czech Republic	xxx				NM	
—	Valentin Androne	Romania	xxx				NM	

==== Group B ====
Place	Athlete	Nation	2.10	2.15	2.19	2.23	Result	Notes
1	Joel Clarke-Khan	Great Britain & N.I.	o	o	o	o	2.23 m	q
2	Mateusz Kołodziejski	Poland	o	o	xo	o	2.23 m	q
3	Oleh Doroshchuk	Ukraine	o	o	o	xo	2.23 m	q
3	Matteo Sioli	Italy	-	o	o	xo	2.23 m	q
3	Gianmarco Tamberi	Italy	-	o	o	xo	2.23 m	q, =SB
6	Antonios Merlos	Greece	o	xo	xo	xo	2.23 m	q
7	Falk Wendrich	Germany	o	o	o	xxo	2.23 m	q, =SB
8	Dmytro Nikitin	Ukraine	o	o	xxx		2.15 m	
9	Erlend Bolstad Raa	Norway	o	xxo			2.15 m	
10	Juozas Baikštys	Lithuania	o	xxx			2.10 m	
10	Matyáš Čudlý	Czech Republic	o	xxx			2.10 m	
12	Jef Vermeiren	Belgium	xo	xxx			2.10 m	
13	Loizos Chrysostomou	Cyprus	xxo	xxx			2.10 m	

=== Final ===
The final was held on 14 August 2026, at 20:00 in the evening.

Place	Athlete	Nation	2.18	2.23	2.27	2.30	2.32	2.34	Result	Notes
1st place, gold medalist(s)	Gianmarco Tamberi	Italy	xo	o	o	xo	xo	r	2.32 m	SB
2nd place, silver medalist(s)	Oleh Doroshchuk	Ukraine	o	o	o	o	xxx		2.30 m	
3rd place, bronze medalist(s)	Matteo Sioli	Italy	o	o	o	xr-			2.27 m	
4	Kimani Jack	Great Britain & N.I.	o	o	xxx				2.23 m	
5	Joel Clarke-Khan	Great Britain & N.I.	o	xo	xxx				2.23 m	
5	Jonathan Kapitolnik	Israel	o	xo	xxx				2.23 m	SB
5	Mateusz Kołodziejski	Poland	o	xo	xxx				2.23 m	
8	Thomas Carmoy	Belgium	o	xxx					2.18 m	
8	Christian Falocchi	Italy	o	xxx					2.18 m	
10	Falk Wendrich	Germany	xo	xxx					2.18 m	
11	Antonios Merlos	Greece	xxo	xxx					2.18 m	
11	Antrea Mita	Greece	xxo	xxx					2.18 m	
—	Edoardo Stronati	Italy	xxx						NM	
