= Mikołaj Szczęsny =

Polish athlete (born 2004)

Personal information
- Nationality: Polish
- Born: 19 December 2004 (age 21)

Sport
- Sport: Athletics
- Event: High jump

Achievements and titles
- Personal bests: High jump: 2.26 (Bergen, 2026)
Medal record
Men's athletics
Representing Poland
European U23 Championships
| Silver medal – second place | 2025 Bergen | High jump |

Mikołaj Szczęsny (born 19 December 2004) is a Polish high jumper. He won the silver medal in the high jump at the 2025 European Athletics U23 Championships and won the senior national title at the 2025 Polish Indoor Athletics Championships.

== Biography ==
From Łęczyca in the Łódź Voivodeship, Szczęsny began as a member of Łęczyca Youth Athletics Club and was coached by Mirosław Andrysiak. He became part of the CWZS Zawisza Bydgoszcz Athletics Association in Bydgoszcz and was later coached by Włodzimierz Michalski.

Szczęsny won the Polish senior national title at the 2025 Polish Indoor Athletics Championships in Toruń, equalling his personal best with a jump of 2.17 metres.

Szczęsny made a big improvement as he won the silver medal in the high jump at the 2025 European Athletics U23 Championships in Bergen, Norway, finishing behind Matteo Sioli of Italy, with a personal best clearance of 2.26 metres, having entered the championships with a personal best of 2.19 metres, and breaking it three times in the competition. He had begun the competition as the ninth-ranked competitor. He was subsequently incited to compete at the 2025 Kamila Skolimowska Memorial, path of the 2025 Diamond League, in Silesia, Poland in August. Later that month, he placed second to Mateusz Kołodziejski at the 2025 Polish Athletics Championships, with a jump of 2.16 metres.

With a best jump of 2.21 metres he placed second to Mateusz Kołodziejski again at the 2026 Polish Indoor Athletics Championships in Bydgoszcz. In August 2026, he competed at the 2026 European Athletics Championships in Birmingham, England.
