= Juliane Hvid =

Danish steeplechase runner (born 1998)

Flavie Renouard
Personal information
- Full name: Juliane Falsig Hvid
- Nationality: Denmark
- Born: 8 April 1998 (28 years, 202 days old)
- Education: Technical University of Denmark

Sport
- Sport: Athletics
- Events: 3000 metres steeplechase 2000 metres steeplechase
- Club: Sparta Atletik og Løb
- Coached by: Christian Friis

Achievements and titles
- National finals: 2022 Danish 10K Champs; • 10km, road, 8th; 2022 Danish Champs; • 3000m s'chase, 1st (gold); 2022 Danish XC; • 8km XC, 2nd (silver); 2023 Danish Indoors; • 3000m, 3rd (bronze); 2023 Danish 10K Champs; • 10km, road, 3rd (bronze); 2023 Danish Champs; • 3000m s'chase, 1st (gold)
- Personal bests: 3000mSC: 9:33.40 (2023) 2000mSC: 6:17.78 NR (2023)
Medal record
Women's athletics
Representing Denmark
Nordic Cross Country Championships
Bronze medal – third place	2023 Reykjavik	Senior race
Bronze medal – third place	2023 Reykjavik	Senior team
Nordic Championships
Gold medal – first place	2023 Copenhagen	3000 m s'chase
- Updated on 20 February 2024

Juliane Falsig Hvid (born 8 April 1998) is a Danish steeplechase runner specializing in the 3000 metres steeplechase. She won the 2023 Nordic Athletics Championships in the steeplechase and has represented Denmark at the 2023 World Athletics Championships. In addition to her athletics career, she is the reigning Nordic military pentathlon champion.

== Career ==
Hvid began her career as a long-distance runner on the roads, finishing 74th at the 2021 Copenhagen Half Marathon. After an 8th-place finish at the 2022 Danish 10K Championships, she debuted in the 3000 m steeplechase to win at the Sparta Copenhagen Games.

One month later at the 2022 Danish Athletics Championships steeplechase, Hvid and Mathilde Diekema Jensen broke away from Laura Astrup early on, extending their lead gradually until the final lap, where Hvid out-sprinted Jensen to win her first national title by one second, in her second-ever steeplechase race. Later that fall, Hvid finished 2nd at the Danish Cross Country Championships, qualifying her to represent Denmark at the 2022 European Cross Country Championships where she finished 48th.

In 2023, Hvid finished 3rd at the Danish Indoor Championships 3000 m, and improved her finish to 3rd again at the Danish 10K Championships. Her first international gold medal came at the 2023 Nordic Athletics Championships reboot, also making her the first-ever Nordic women's steeplechase champion as the previous editions did not include that discipline. She defended her steeplechase title at the 2023 Danish Athletics Championships, and a 9:33.40 personal best at the 2023 Anniversary Games qualified her for the 2023 World Athletics Championships. She was the second steeplechaser ever to represent Denmark at the World Athletics Championships, after Anna Emilie Møller.

At the world championships, Hvid crashed into a barrier about one minute into her heat, falling to the track. Despite visible blood from her chin and upper body, she finished the heat in 10th place. She claimed to have not felt pain due to being zoned in to the race. She finished her 2023 season by placing 3rd at the Nordic Cross Country Championships individually, and 17th at her second European Cross Country Championships.

== Personal life ==
Hvid was a full-time sergeant in the Danish Armed Forces before she joined the Sparta Atletik club in 2021. She took up running initially to train for the military pentathlon, which included a 4000 m cross country run and an obstacle run as two of its events. In addition to being Nordic champion in the steeplechase, she is also the reigning Nordic Military Pentathlon Championships winner.

She studies health technology at the Technical University of Denmark, and as of 2023 still acts as a reserve in the Danish military.

== Statistics ==
=== Personal best progression ===
3000m Steeplechase progression
#	Mark	Pl.	Competition	Venue	Date	Ref.
1	10:46.66	1st place, gold medalist(s)	Sparta Copenhagen Games	København, Denmark	21 May 2022	
2	10:36.42	1st place, gold medalist(s)	Danish Athletics Championships	Aalborg, Denmark	24 Jun 2022	
3	9:48.46	1st place, gold medalist(s)	Tårnby Games	Tårnby, Denmark	6 May 2023	
4	9:46.41	1st place, gold medalist(s)	Nordic Athletics Championships	København, Denmark	27 May 2023	
5	9:43.61	1st place, gold medalist(s)	Folksam GP	Göteborg, Sweden	17 Jun 2023	
6	9:36.98	3rd place, bronze medalist(s)	European Team Championships Division 2	Chorzów, Poland	21 Jun 2023	
7	9:33.40	8th	London Athletics Meet	London, Great Britain	22 Jul 2023	
