= Edoardo Stronati =

Italian high-jumper

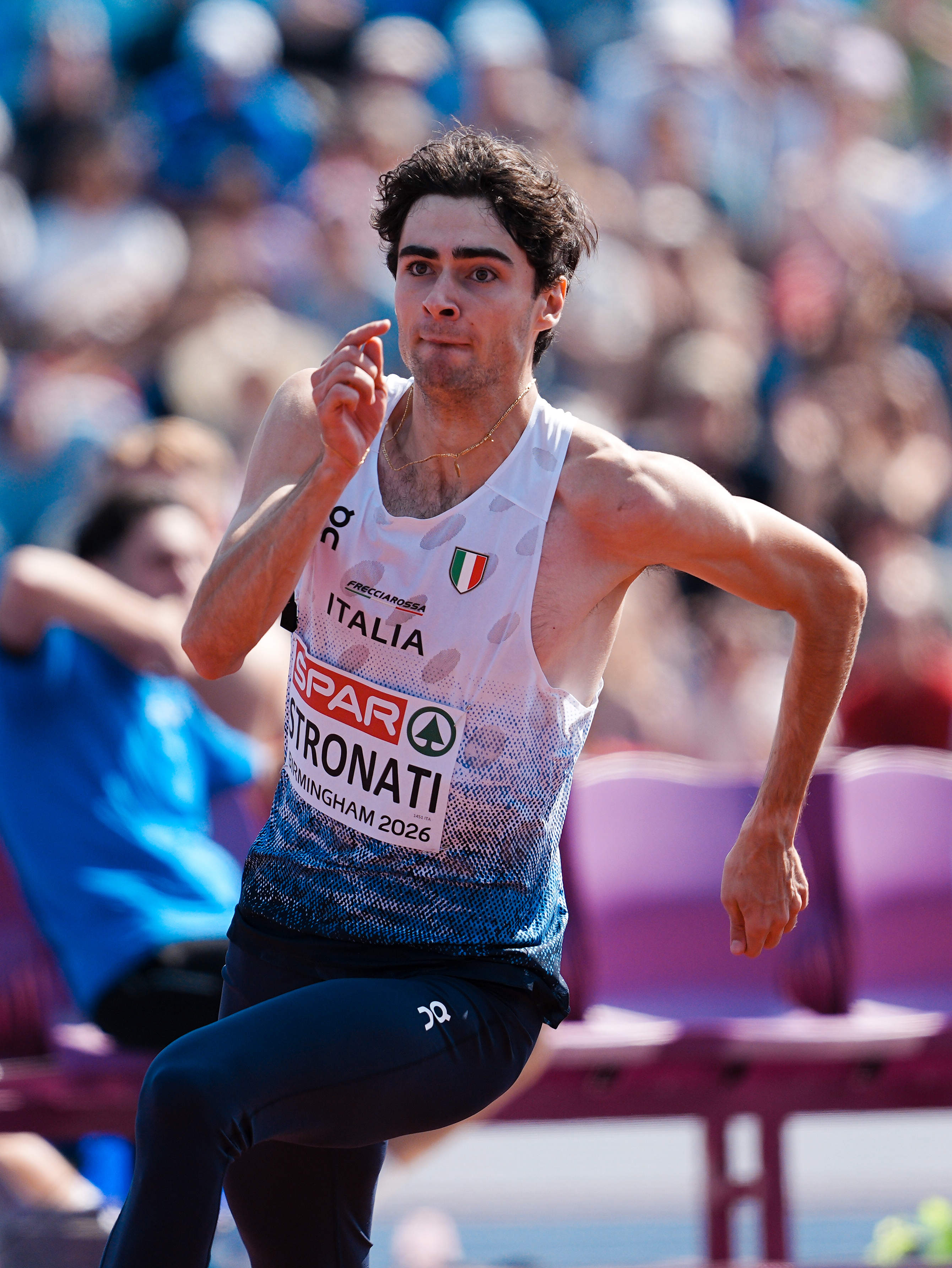

Personal information
- Born: 19 May 2004 (age 22)

Sport
- Sport: Athletics
- Event: High jump
- Club: Fiamme Gialle
- Coached by: Daniela Frasani

Achievements and titles
- Personal best: High jump: 2.27 m (2026)
Medal record
Men's athletics
Representing Italy
European U20 Championships
Silver medal – second place	2023 Jerusalem	High jump

Edoardo Stronati (born 19 May 2004) is an Italian high jumper. He was a silver medalist at the 2023 European Athletics U20 Championships.

== Biography ==
From Rho, Lombardy, and later based in Milan, coached by Daniela Frasani is a member of the Fiamme Gialle, Stronati jumped 2.10 metres in July 2020, a personal best by nine centimetres.

Stronati competed in the 2022 World Athletics U20 Championships final in Cali, Colombia and later jumped 2.15m to win the Italian U23 title in October 2022. He went on to set an Italian junior record of 2.24 metres in February 2023. He was a silver medalist at the 2023 European Athletics U20 Championships in Jerusalem, Israel, clearing 2.18 metres, equal with gold medal winner Melwin Lycke Holm of Sweden, who cleared it at the first attempt. However, he competed with a patellar tendon injury in the final which ruled him out of action for most of 2024. He placed tenth in the final having been selected to represent Italy at the 2025 European Athletics U23 Championships in Bergen, Norway, but was still troubled by injury throughout the season.

In July 2026, he set a new personal best with a clearance of 2.25 metres in Brescia. Later that month, he jumped a new personal best again with 2.27 metres to place second to Matteo Sioli in the final of the high jump at the senior Italian Athletics Championships. Named in the Italian team for the 2026 European Athletics Championships in Birmingham, England, he qualified for the final of the men's high jump competition, having cleared 2.19 metres in the qualifying round, but did not clear 2.18 metres in the final.
