= Stadionområdet, Malmö =

Area of Malmö, Sweden

Coordinates: 55°35′10″N 12°59′21″E

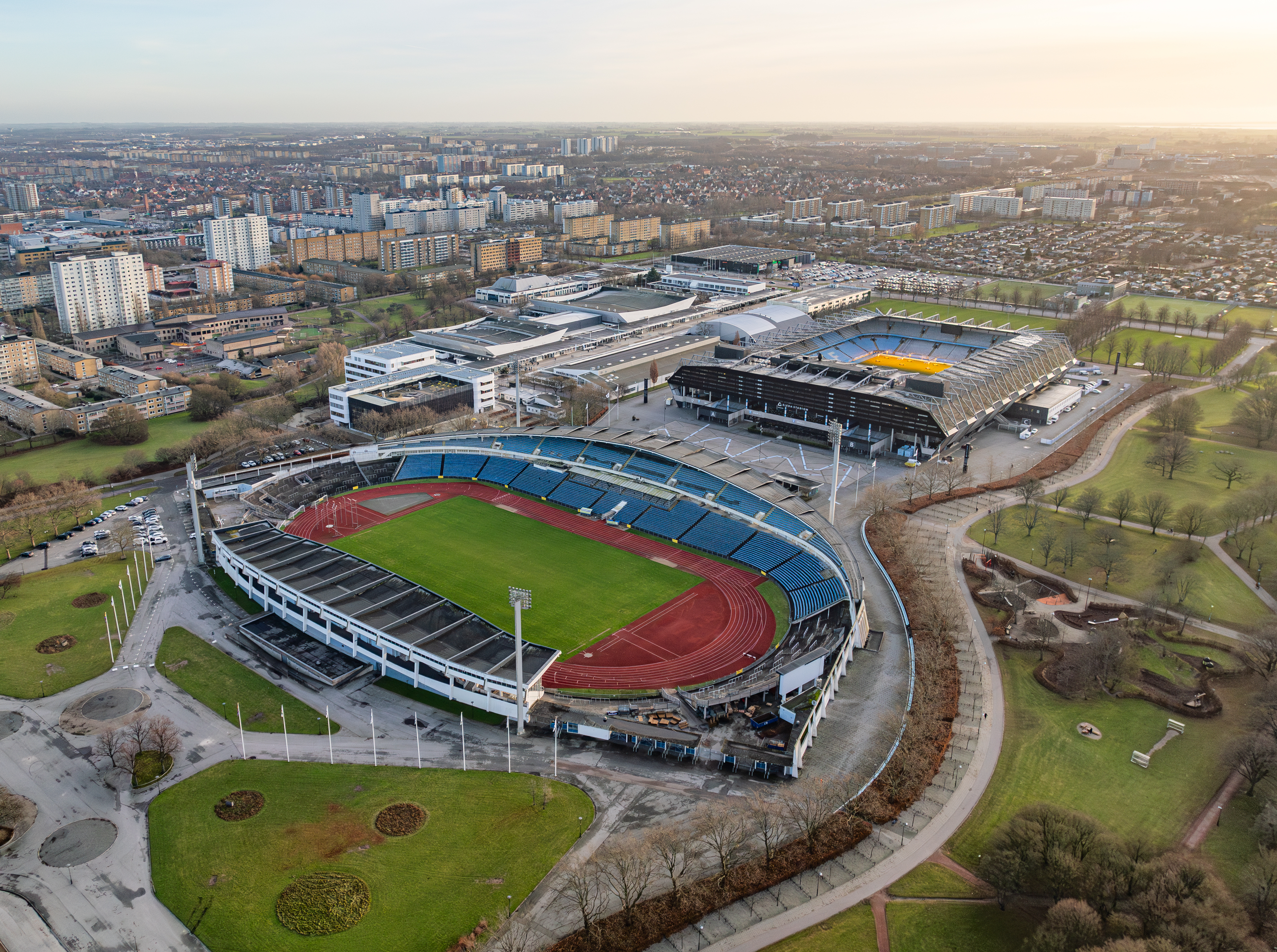
Aerial view of the stadium district (2023)

Stadionområdet (The stadium district) is an area in Malmö, Sweden. The area is the home of two major stadiums, an ice hockey arena, an indoors arena, and several training facilities for association football, ice hockey and track and field sports.

== Venues ==
Venue	Image	Purpose	Capacity	Date built
Malmö Stadion		Multi-purpose outdoors arena	27,500	1958
Stadion		Football stadium	24,000	2009
Malmö Isstadion		Indoor sports arena with ice rink	5,800	1968
Baltiska Hallen		Indoor sports arena and concerts	4,000	1964
Atleticum		Indoor sports arena with running tracks	—N/a	1992
Kombihallen		Indoor football training facilities with artificial turf	—N/a	1980

== Training facilities ==
The area features several training facilities for numerous sports. Most notably the area features five football fields that are located south of Stadion. Two of these fields are fitted with artificial turf and located on the south side of Stadiongatan from the rest of the area. The fields are primarily used by Malmö FF, IFK Malmö, and various minor football clubs. Indoor football facilities are located in Kombihallen, which is located southeast of Stadion. Kombihallen is used by Malmö FF during the colder periods of the year when outdoor training is complicated due to snowfall.
