= 2023 Nordic Athletics Championships =

- Dates: 27-28 May
- Host city: Copenhagen, Denmark
- Level: Senior
- Type: Outdoor
- Participation: 287 athletes from 5 nations

The 2023 Nordic Athletics Championships was the fourth edition of the international athletics competition between Nordic countries and was held in Copenhagen, Denmark. It was the first time the championship returned, after having been discontinued since 1965.

Henrik Larsson was the most successful athlete at the championships, winning the 100 m and 200 m. Though his 100 m time was wind-assisted, his 200 m time of 20.44 seconds was the second-fastest in Swedish history.

== Medal summary ==
=== Men ===
Event	Gold		Silver		Bronze	
100m	Henrik Larsson; Sweden	10.09	Kolbeinn Höður Gunnarsson; Iceland	10.29	Jacob Vaula; Norway	10.40
200m	Henrik Larsson; Sweden	20.44	Viljami Kaasalainen; Finland	20.90	Kolbeinn Höður Gunnarsson; Iceland	20.91 NR
400m	Håvard Bentdal Ingvaldsen; Norway	46.32	Gustav Lundholm Nielsen; Denmark	46.40	Andreas Grimerud; Norway	46.43
800m	Joonas Rinne; Finland	1:48.23	Kristian Uldbjerg Hansen; Denmark	1:48.79	Erik Martinsson; Sweden	1:49.08
1500m	Emil Danielsson; Sweden	3:39.01	Kristian Uldbjerg Hansen; Denmark	3:40.19	Ferdinand Kvan Edman; Norway	3:40.77
5000m	Mikael Johnsen; Denmark	13:50.80	Mohammadreza Abootorabi; Sweden	13:51.26	Mikkel Dahl-Jessen; Denmark	13:53.19
110mH	Max Hrelja; Sweden	13.50	Joel Bengtsson; Sweden	13.74	Ilari Manninen; Finland	13.93
400mH	Tuomas Lehtonen; Finland	50.92	Karl Wållgren; Sweden	51.49	Sebastian Monneret; Denmark	52.36
3000mSC	Axel Djurberg; Sweden	8:45.93	Jakob Dybdal Abrahamsen; Denmark	8:48.35	Vebjørn Hovdejord; Norway	8:53.66
4x100m	Sweden; Sweden; Thomas Jones; Milo Wahlgren; Alexander Pilgrim; Emil Johansson	40.02				
4x400m	Sweden; Sweden; Gustav Gahne; Mattias Waernulf; Alexander Nyström; Emil Johansson	3:09.99	Norway; Norway; Håvard Bentdal Ingvaldsen; Andreas Grimerud; Andreas Haara Bakketun; Andreas Dixon	3:11.20	Denmark; Denmark; Sofus Olivarius Vølund; Jónas Gunnleivsson Isaksen; Joel von de Ahé; Carl Bäckström Nielsen	3:13.78
Discus Throw	Guðni Valur Guðnason; Iceland	63.41 m	Sven Martin Skagestad; Norway	61.11 m	Mimir Sigurdsson; Iceland	54.81 m
Hammer Throw	Aaron Kangas; Finland	73.37 m	Hilmar Örn Jónsson; Iceland	73.28 m	Tuomas Seppänen; Finland	73.16 m
High Jump	Melwin Lycke Holm; Sweden	2.18 m	Daniel Kosonen; Finland	2.15 m	Mads Moos Larsen; Denmark	2.00 m
Javelin Throw	Sindri Hrafn Guðmundsson; Iceland	76.40 m	Dagbjartur Daði Jónsson; Iceland	75.38 m	Jakob Samuelsson; Sweden	75.08 m
Long Jump	Henrik Flåtnes; Norway	7.72 m	Daníel Ingi Egilsson; Iceland	7.53 m	Kasper Larsen; Denmark	7.46 m
Pole Vault	Juho Alasaari; Finland	5.30 m	William Asker; Sweden	5.20 m	Tommi Holttinen; Finland	5.10 m
Shot Put	Wictor Petersson; Sweden	19.74 m	Jesper Ahlin; Sweden	17.91 m	Kenneth Mertz; Denmark	16.76 m
Triple Jump	Daníel Ingi Egilsson; Iceland	15.98 m	Dennis Mägi; Denmark	15.19 m	Tòrur Mortensen; Denmark	14.81 m

=== Women ===
Event	Gold		Silver		Bronze	
100m	Lotta Kemppinen; Finland	11.47	Julia Henriksson; Sweden	11.56	Helene Rønningen; Norway	11.56
200m	Julia Henriksson; Sweden	23.32	Christine Bjelland Jensen; Norway	23.47	Lisa Lilja; Sweden	23.79
400m	Lakeri Ertzgaard; Norway	53.09	Mette Baas; Finland	53.13	Aino Pulkkinen; Finland	53.99
800m	Annemarie Nissen; Denmark	2:04.72	Julia Nielsen; Sweden	2:05.46	Maria Freij; Sweden	2:05.95
1500m	Sofia Thøgersen; Denmark	4:16.02	Olivia Weslien; Sweden	4:18.38	Malin Edland; Norway	4:18.56
5000m	Nanna Bové; Denmark	15:53.20	Kristine Lande Dommersnes; Norway	15:53.45	Nina Chydenius; Finland	15:58.01
100mH	Annimari Korte; Finland	13.04	Mette Graversgaard; Denmark	13.21	Mathilde Heltbech; Denmark	13.38
400mH	Nora Kollerød Wold; Norway	57.74	Andrea Rooth; Norway	58.05	Martha Rasmussen; Denmark	58.11
3000mSC	Juliane Hvid; Denmark	9:46.41	Linn Söderholm; Sweden	9:57.94	Sofia Thøgersen; Denmark	10:02.69
4x100m	Norway; Norway; Helene Rønningen; Vilde Aasmo; Maren Bakke Amundsen; Marte Pettersen	44.57	Sweden; Sweden; Filippa Sivnert; Julia Henriksson; Nora Lindahl; Wilma Svenson	45.83		
4x400m	Finland; Finland; Milja Thureson; Aino Pulkkinen; Kristiina Halonen; Mette Baas	3:32.84	Norway; Norway; Andrea Rooth; Elisabeth Slettum; Kaitesi Ertzgaard; Lakeri Ertzgaard	3:32.88	Denmark; Denmark; Anna Øbakke Lange; Anne Sofie Kirkegaard; Martha Rasmussen; Zarah Buchwald Johansen	3:37.14
Discus Throw	Vanessa Kamga; Sweden	57.39 m	Lotta Flatum; Norway	55.82 m	Annesofie Hartmann Nielsen; Denmark	55.01 m
Hammer Throw	Krista Tervo; Finland	71.86 m	Katrine Koch Jacobsen; Denmark	70.54 m	Suvi Koskinen; Finland	68.85 m
High Jump	Ellen Ekholm; Sweden	1.85 m	Louise Ekman; Sweden	1.82 m	Bianca Salming; Sweden	1.82 m
Javelin Throw	Anni-Linnea Alanen; Finland	54.42 m	Amanda Olsson; Sweden	49.82 m	Beatrice Lantz; Sweden	47.91 m
Long Jump	Kaiza Karlén; Sweden	6.39 m	Jenny Lestander; Sweden	6.29 m	Karolina Svensson; Sweden	6.29 m
Pole Vault	Caroline Bonde Holm; Denmark	4.50 m	Saga Andersson; Finland	4.50 m	Kitty Friele Faye; Norway	4.30 m
Shot Put	Eveliina Rouvali; Finland	17.53 m	Sara Lennman; Sweden	17.41 m	Senja Mäkitörmä; Finland	16.73 m
Triple Jump	Maja Åskag; Sweden	14.00 m	Rebecka Abrahamsson; Sweden	13.59 m	Rachel Ombeni; Norway	13.43 m

== Medal table ==
Rank	Nation	Gold	Silver	Bronze	Total
1	Sweden (SWE)	14	16	6	36
2	Finland (FIN)	10	7	8	25
3	Denmark (DEN)	8	9	11	28
4	Norway (NOR)	7	6	12	25
5	Iceland (ISL)	3	4	2	9
Totals (5 entries)		42	42	39	123
