= Antonios Merlos =

Greek high jumper (born 1999)

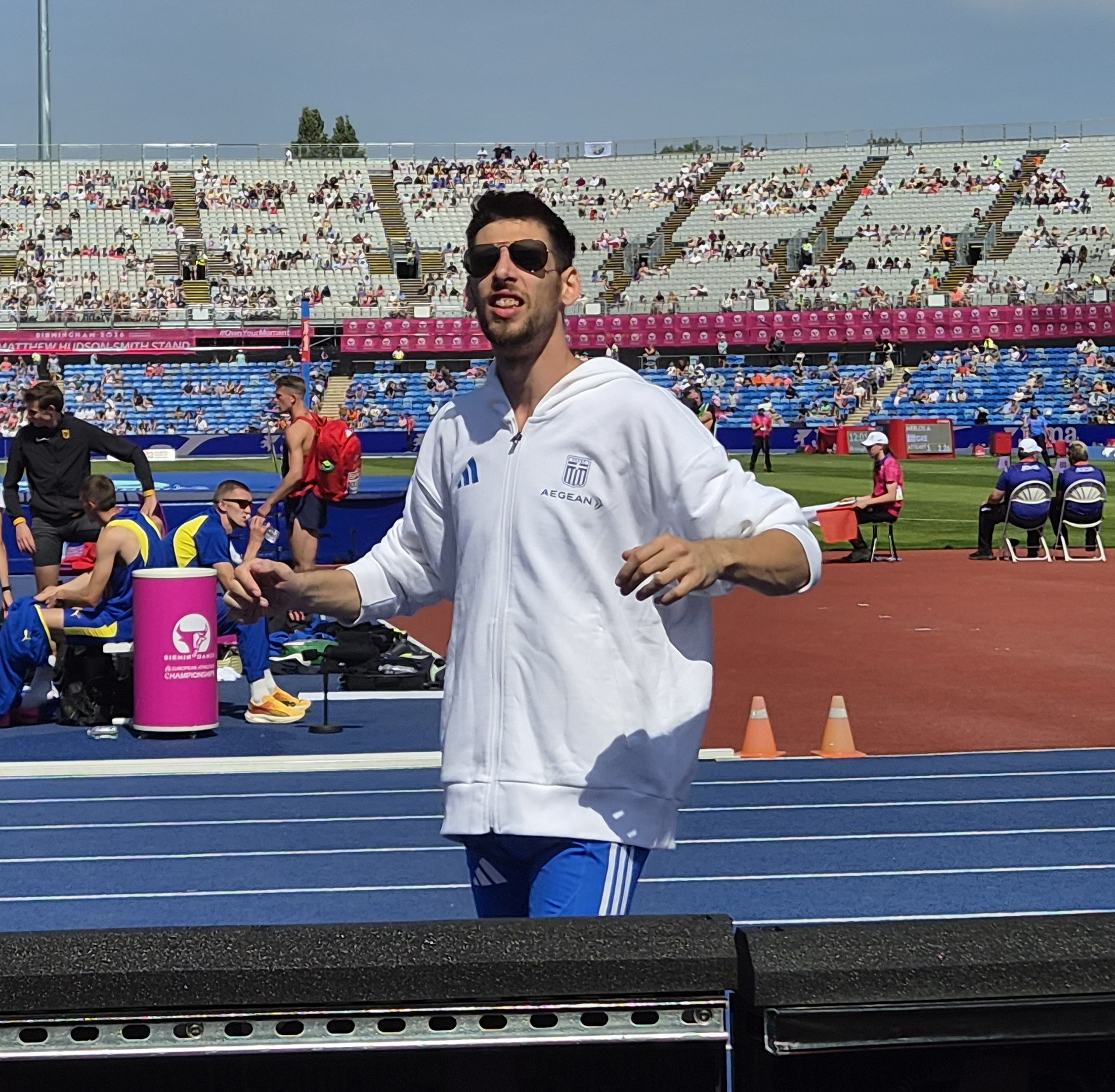
- 2026 European Championships

Personal information
- Born: 4 April 1999 (age 27)

Sport
- Sport: Athletics
- Event: High jump

Achievements and titles
- Personal best: High jump: 2.27 m (2026)
Medal record
Representing Greece
World U20 Championships
Gold medal – first place	2018 Tampere	High jump
European Youth Championships
Silver medal – second place	2016 Tbilisi	High jump
Mediterranean Games
Silver medal – second place	2026 Taranto	High jump

Antonios Merlos (born 4 April 1999) is a Greek high jumper. He is a multiple-time national champion and won the 2018 IAAF World U20 Championships.

== Biography ==
A footballer in his youth, Merlos was directed towards athletics in 2013 after coaches noted his ability in vertical leaps on the football field. Merlos made his international debut at the European Youth Olympic Festival in Tbilisi in 2015, where he was third overall with a best clearance of 2.06 metres. Merlos won the silver medal in Tbilisi at the 2016 European Athletics U18 Championships. In 2017, Merlos improved his personal best to 2.20m to win the Greek U20 national title. That year, he moved to the United States, enrolling at the University of Georgia on a four-year scholarship, where he worked under Cypriot coach Petros Kyprianou. In June 2018, he jumped 2.18m to finish fifth at the 2018 NCAA Division I Outdoor Track and Field Championships. That summer, he won the gold medal at the 2018 IAAF World U20 Championships in Tampere, agreeing to share the gold medal with Roberto Vilches of Mexico after both cleared 2.23m at their first attempt, and could not be separated on countback.

In August 2020, he won his first outdoor senior title at the Greek Athletics Championships. He won the title again in 2023 alongside Antrea Mita, with both athletes clearing 2.19 metres. In September 2020, he improved his personal best to 2.24 metres competing at the Gala dei Castelli in Bellinzona, Switzerland. He competed for Greece at the 2024 European Athletics Championships in Rome, without advancing to the final.

In 2025, Merlos moved from his base in Thessaloniki to Athens to work at PAOK under coach Thodoris Dosis. Merlos competed at the 2025 European Athletics Indoor Championships in Apeldoorn, Netherlands without qualifying to the final. He also competed for Greece at the 2025 European Athletics Team Championships in Madrid in June 2025, jumping 2.21 metres. He won the Greek national title again in August 2025.

In January 2026, Merlos cleared a lifetime best height of 2.27m for victory in the high jump at the Gorzow Jump Festival, a World Athletics Indoor Tour Silver meeting. He placed eighth overall at the 2026 World Athletics Indoor Championships in Poland in March 2026. In August 2026, he was a finalist at the 2026 European Athletics Championships in Birmingham, England.

== Competition record ==
Representing Greece
Year	Competition	Venue	Position	Notes
2025	European Ιndoor Championships	Apeldoorn, Netherlands	13th (q)	2.18 m
2026	World Indoor Championships	Toruń, Poland	8th	2.22 m
2026	European Championships	Birmingham, United Kingdom	11th	2.18 m
2026	Mediterranean Games	Taranto, Italy	2nd	2.19 m
