= Antrea Mita =

Greek high-jumper

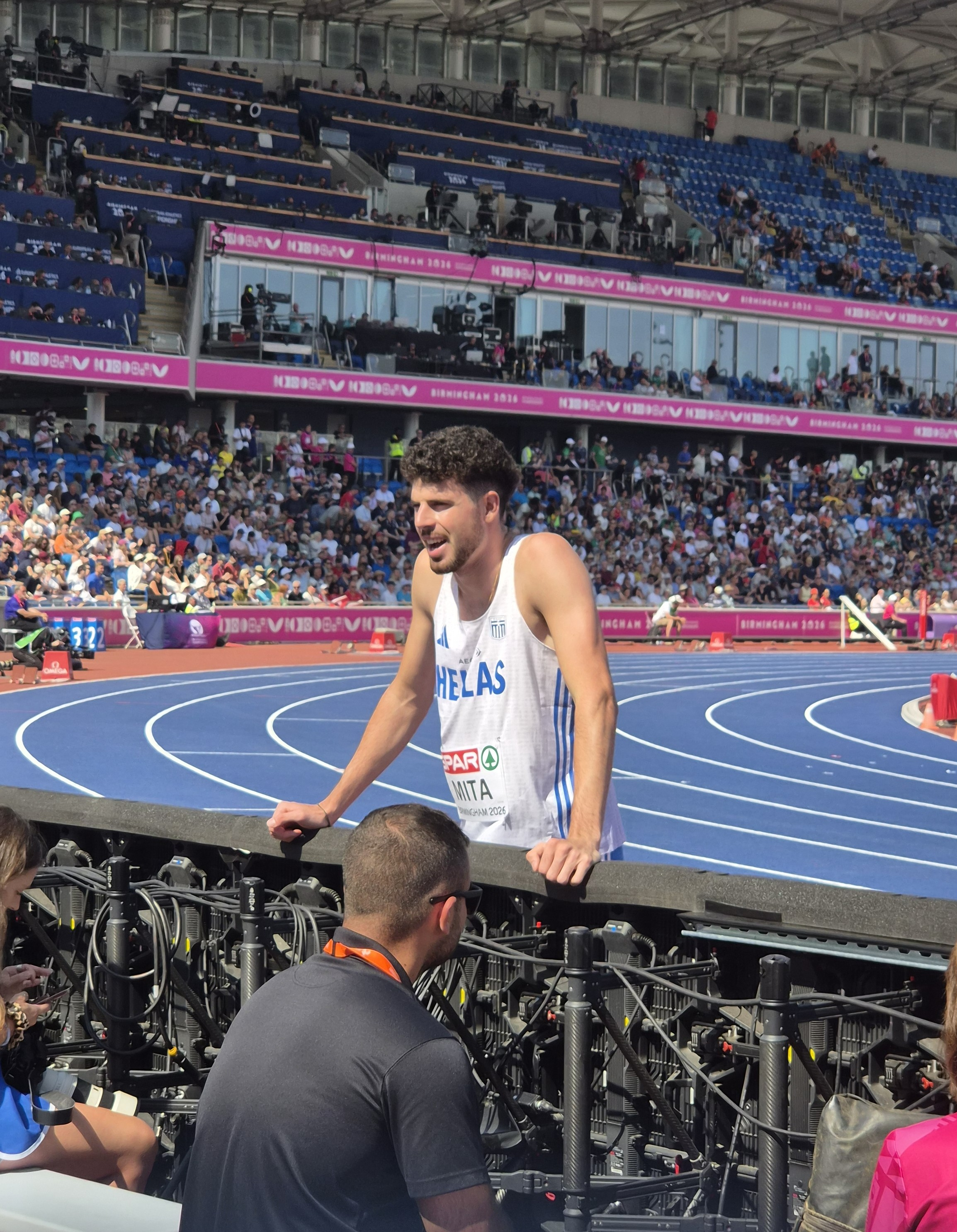
- 2026 European Championships

Personal information
- Born: 4 May 2005 (age 21)

Sport
- Sport: Athletics
- Event: High jump

Achievements and titles
- Personal best: High jump 2.26 m (2025)
Medal record
Men's athletics
Representing Greece
Balkan Championships
Gold medal – first place	2026 Volos	High jump

Antrea Mita (born 4 May 2005) is a Greek high jumper. He is a multiple-time Greek national champion.

== Biography ==
Mita is from Preveza and is a member of A.S. "EVZIN" Preveza, where he is coached by Sila Geronta. He won the senior Greek Indoor Athletics Championships in February 2021 with a jump of 1.98 metres. He won the senior outdoor Greek Athletics Championships in July 2023 alongside Antonios Merlos, with both athletes clearing 2.19 metres.

He retained his Greek championship title in 2024, with a new personal best, jumping 2.20 metres. He placed fifth in the high jump at the 2024 World Athletics U20 Championships in Lima, Peru.

Competition for the University of Houston in February 2025, he cleared a new personal best of 2.26 metres. Mita places thirteenth at the 2025 NCAA Championships, and was selected to represent Greece at the 2025 European Athletics U23 Championships in Bergen, Norway. In July, he placed fourth with 2.15 metres for the high jump at the 2025 Balkan Athletics Championships with a jump of 2.20 metres.

Mita placed second at the Big 12 Indoor Track & Field Championship in February 2026, with a jump of 2.22 metres. He placed eighth overall with 2.15 metres at the 2026 NCAA Division I Indoor Track and Field Championships. In May, he equalled his personal best with 2.26 metres to win the Big 12 Outdoor Championships. In June, he qualified for the 2026 NCAA Outdoor Championships. That month, he won the gold medal in the high jump at the 2026 Balkan Athletics Championships with a jump of 2.20 metres. In August 2026, he competed at the 2026 European Athletics Championships in Birmingham, England, qualifying for the final and placing joint-eleventh.
