= Elin Östlund =

Swedish sprinter (born 1992)

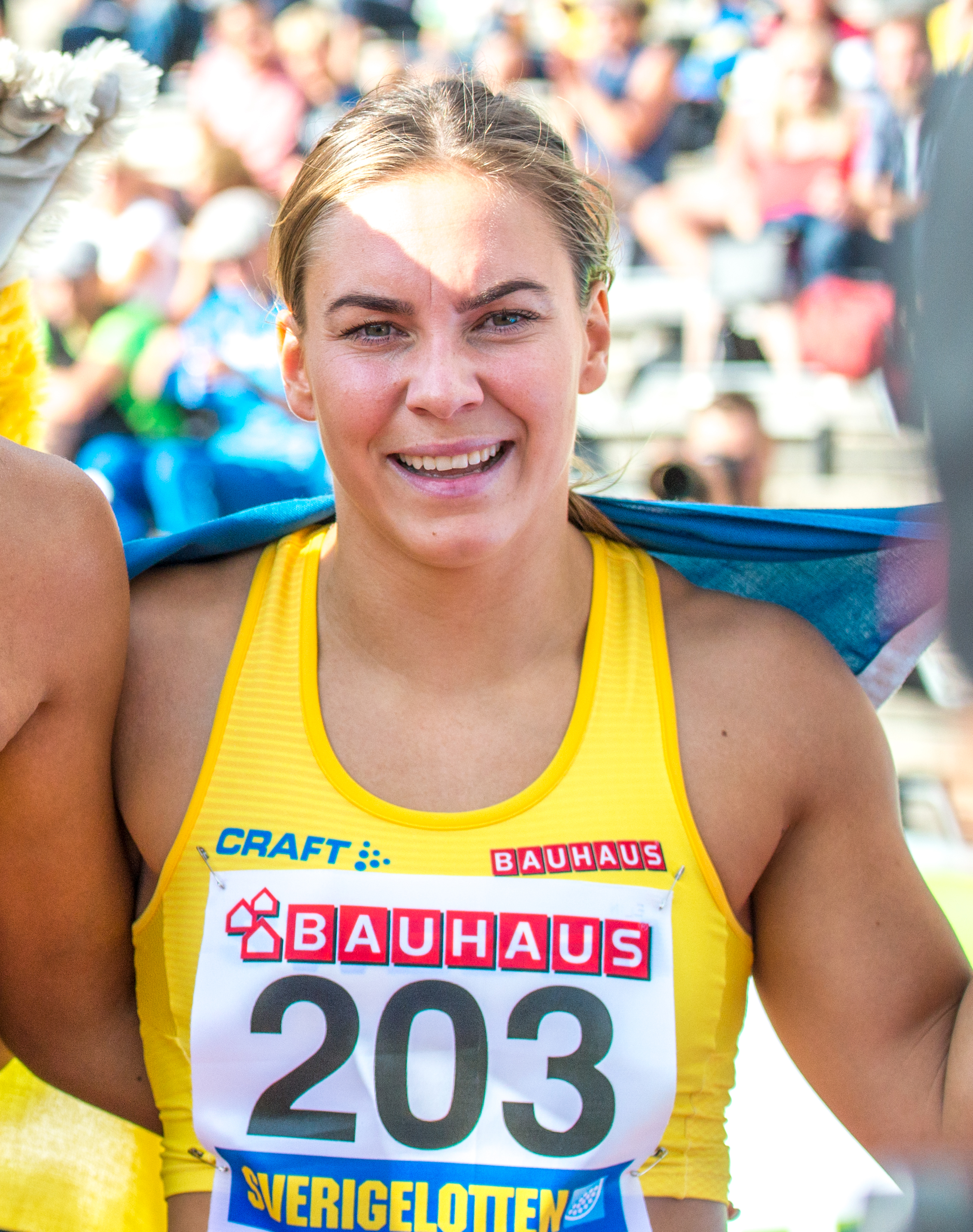
- Östlund at the 2019 Finland-Sweden Athletics International

Personal information
- Nationality: Swedish
- Born: 14 February 1992 (age 34)

Sport
- Sport: Athletics
- Event(s): 200 metres, 60 metres
- Club: KFUM Örebro

Achievements and titles
- Personal bests: 60m i: 7.38 (2020); 200m i: 23.74 (2020)

Elin Östlund (born 14 February 1992) is a Swedish sprinter. She is a two-time Swedish Athletics Championships national champion in the 200 metres (outdoors) and 60 metres (indoors), and a finalist at the 2013 European Athletics U23 Championships in the 4 × 100 metres relay.

== Biography ==
Östlund's first appearance at the senior Swedish Athletics Championships was in 2008, where she finished 7th in the 100 m with a time of 12.12.

Her first international championship final was in 2013, when she finished 6th in the 4 × 100 m at the 2013 European Athletics U23 Championships.

In 2017, Östlund made her Diamond League debut at the Stockholm Diamond League meeting. She finished 8th in the 200 m with a time of 23.82 seconds. Her first two national titles also came that year, both indoors (in the 60 m) and outdoors (in the 200 m).

Östlund then had an achilles tendon injury, which healed by her 2020 season opener. Later that year, she set personal bests at 60 metres and 200 metres indoors.

Östlund trains with the KFUM Örebro club in Örebro, Sweden.

== Statistics ==
=== Personal bests ===
Event	Mark	Competition	Venue	Date
60 metres	7.38	Swedish Athletics Indoor Championships	Växjö, Sweden	22 February 2020
200 metres (indoor)	23.74	Swedish Athletics Indoor Championships	Växjö, Sweden	23 February 2020
