= Världsungdomsspelen =

Youth track and field competition in Sweden

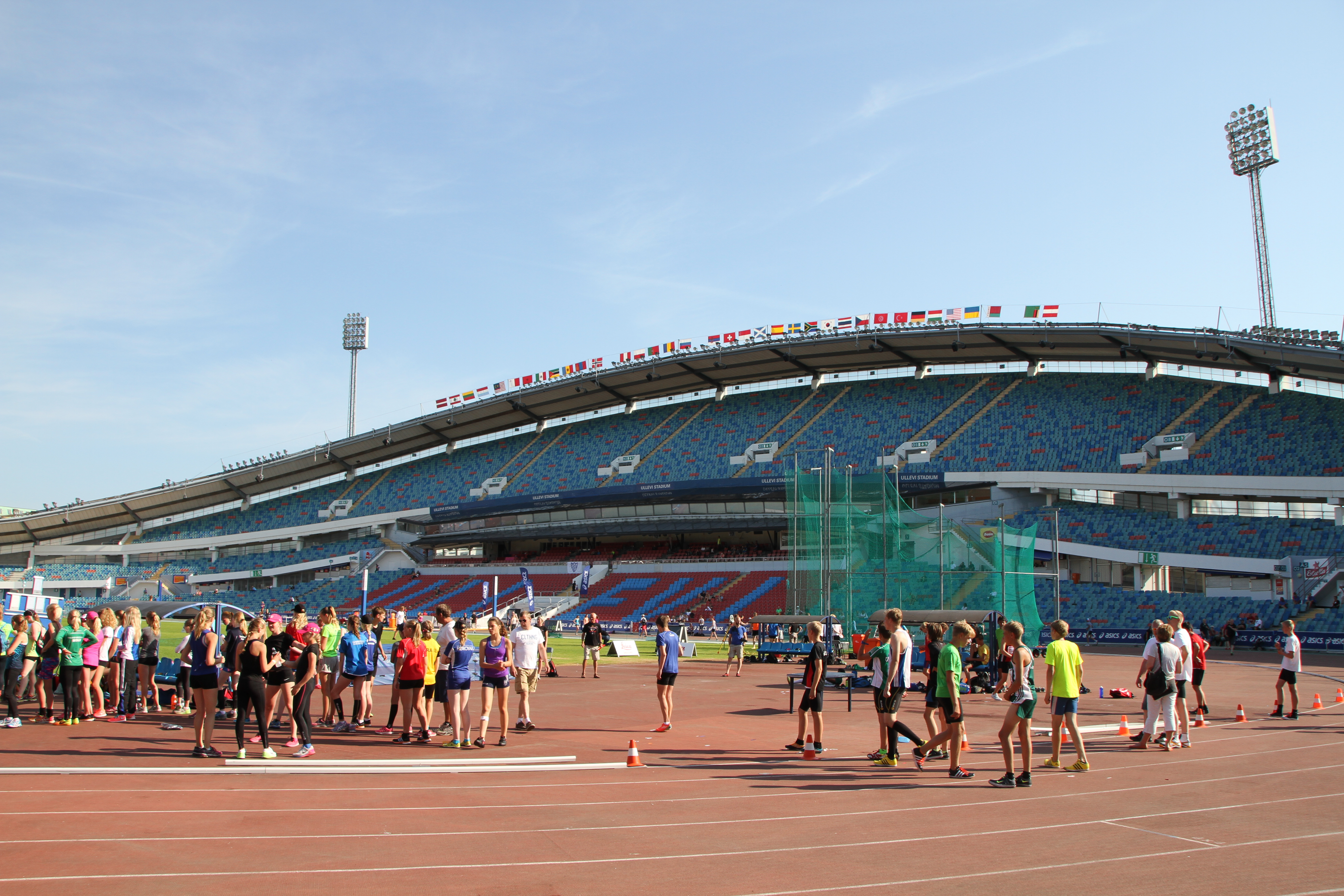
- Youth athletes preparing to compete at the 2015 meet
- Date: July
- Location: Gothenburg, Sweden
- Event type: Track and field
- Website: www.vuspel.se

The Världsungdomsspelen (translation: World Youth Games), also known as the Gothenburg Youth Games, is an annual youth outdoor track and field competition open to the public, with age category competitions between the ages of twelve and nineteen, as well as senior level events. First organised in 1996, it is held over three days each July at the Ullevi stadium in Gothenburg. It is a mass participation event, typically attracting around 3500 mostly Swedish athletes, and its popularity has led to the introduction of qualifying standards for the throwing events. The event attracts participation from beyond Sweden, with twenty nations represented at the 2019 event.

Many Swedish international track and field athletes have participated in the senior competition, with meet record breakers including Olympic champions Carolina Klüft, Stefan Holm and Gerd Kanter, as well as European medallists Susanna Kallur and Emma Green. Several athletes who set age category records as teenagers at the Världsungdomsspelen have gone on to international success, such as Olympic champion Armand Duplantis, European champion Henrik Ingebrigtsen, European medallist Aníta Hinriksdóttir and world medalist Iréne Ekelund. The competition allows young people and international class athletes to compete in the same space.

== Meeting records ==
=== Senior men ===
Event	Record	Athlete	Nationality	Date	Ref
100 m	10.27	Jaysuma Saidy Ndure	Gambia	2006	
200 m	20.65	Johan Wissman	Sweden	2005	
400 m	46.26	Johan Wissman	Sweden	2012	
800 m	1:45.20	Khadevis Robinson	United States	2002	
1500 m	3.46.09	Henrik Ingebrigtsen Eric Senorski	Norway Sweden	2009 2011	
3000 m	8:14.04	Mustafa Mohamed	Sweden	99	
5000 m	14:24.84	Jörgen Johansson	Sweden	2008	
110 m hurdles	13.49	Robert Kronberg	Sweden	2003	
400 m hurdles	49.45	Karsten Warholm	Norway	2015	
3000 m steeplechase	8:53.50	Robin Lindgren	Sweden	2012	
High jump	2.28 m	Linus Thörnblad	Sweden	2008	
Pole vault	5.60 m	Patrik Kristiansson	Sweden	2000	
Long jump	8.25 m	Morten Jensen	Denmark	2005	
Triple jump	16.73 m	Peder Pawel Nielsen	Denmark	2012	
Shot put	19.65 m	Kim Christensen	Denmark	2011	
Discus throw	63.97 m	Sven Martin Skagestad	Norway	2017	
Hammer throw	70.89 m	Bengt Johansson	Sweden	2006	
Javelin throw	76.92 m	Huang Shih-feng	Chinese Taipei	2016	

=== Senior women ===
Event	Record	Athlete	Nationality	Date	Ref
100 m	11.46	Helene Rønningen	Norway	2018	
200 m	23.64	Elisabeth Slettum	Norway	2015	
400 m	53.21	Ellinor Stuhrman	Sweden	2003	
800 m	2:02.74	Lovisa Lindh	Sweden	2014	
1500 m	4:20.96	Ida Nilsson	Sweden	2005	
3000 m	9:21.78	Maria Larsen	Denmark	2015	
100 m hurdles	13.53	Agathe Holtan Wathne	Norway	2017	
400 m hurdles	56.07	Amalie Iuel	Norway	2018	
2000 m steeplechase	6:32.49	Sandra Eriksson	Finland	2008	
3000 m steeplechase	10:10.20	Klara Bodinson	Sweden	2013	
High jump	1.92 m	Emma Green	Sweden	2005	
Pole vault	4.71 m	Michaela Meijer	Sweden	2017	
Long jump	6.82 m	Erica Johansson	Sweden	1999	
Triple jump	13.85 m	Camilla Johansson	Sweden	1999	
Shot put	16.05 m	Helena Engman	Sweden	2004	
Discus throw	60.68 m	Anna Söderberg	Sweden	2005	
Hammer throw	66.64 m	Tracey Andersson	Sweden	2015	
Javelin throw	56.04	Christina Scherwin	Denmark	2000	
