= Kombihallen =

Football stadium in Malmö, Sweden

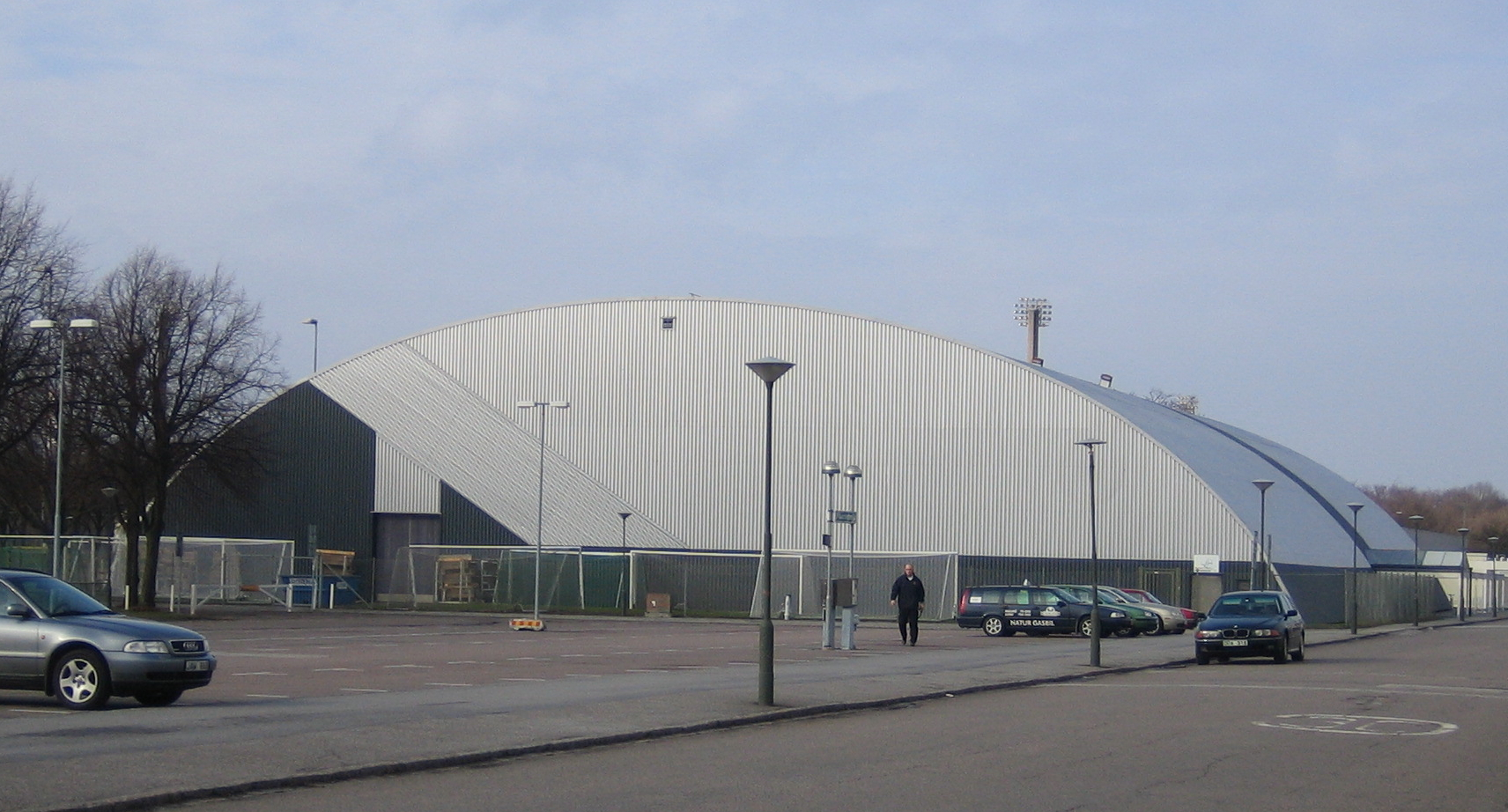
- Interactive map of Kombihallen
- Location: Eric Perssons väg 31, 217 62 Malmö
- Coordinates: 55°34′57″N 12°59′21″E
- Owner: Malmö Stad
- Operator: Malmö Stad
- Surface: Artificial turf
- Field size: 60 × 42 metres

Construction
- Opened: 1980

Kombihallen is an indoor arena for association football in Malmö, Sweden. The main purpose of the arena is for football training when outdoor training is discouraged due to bad weather or snowfall. The arena has an area of 4,000 Km² with artificial turf. The main playing field can be used as one big field with an area of 60 x 42 metres and three minor playing fields with 18.5 x 42 metres area.

The arena is owned by Malmö Stad and is mostly used by Malmö FF as part of the club's pre-season training when cold weather conditions prevents outdoor training. The area is also used by IFK Malmö and various minor football clubs in the Malmö area. The arena was built in 1980 and is part of Stadionområdet located next to numerous other stadiums such as Malmö FF's home stadium Stadion and the multi-purpose stadium Malmö Stadion.

== Events ==
Kombihallen is one of the host arenas of the annual football tournament Skånecupen for youth teams between 10 and 16 years old. The tournament is held annually from late December until early January.
