= Tilde Johansson =

Swedish athletics competitor

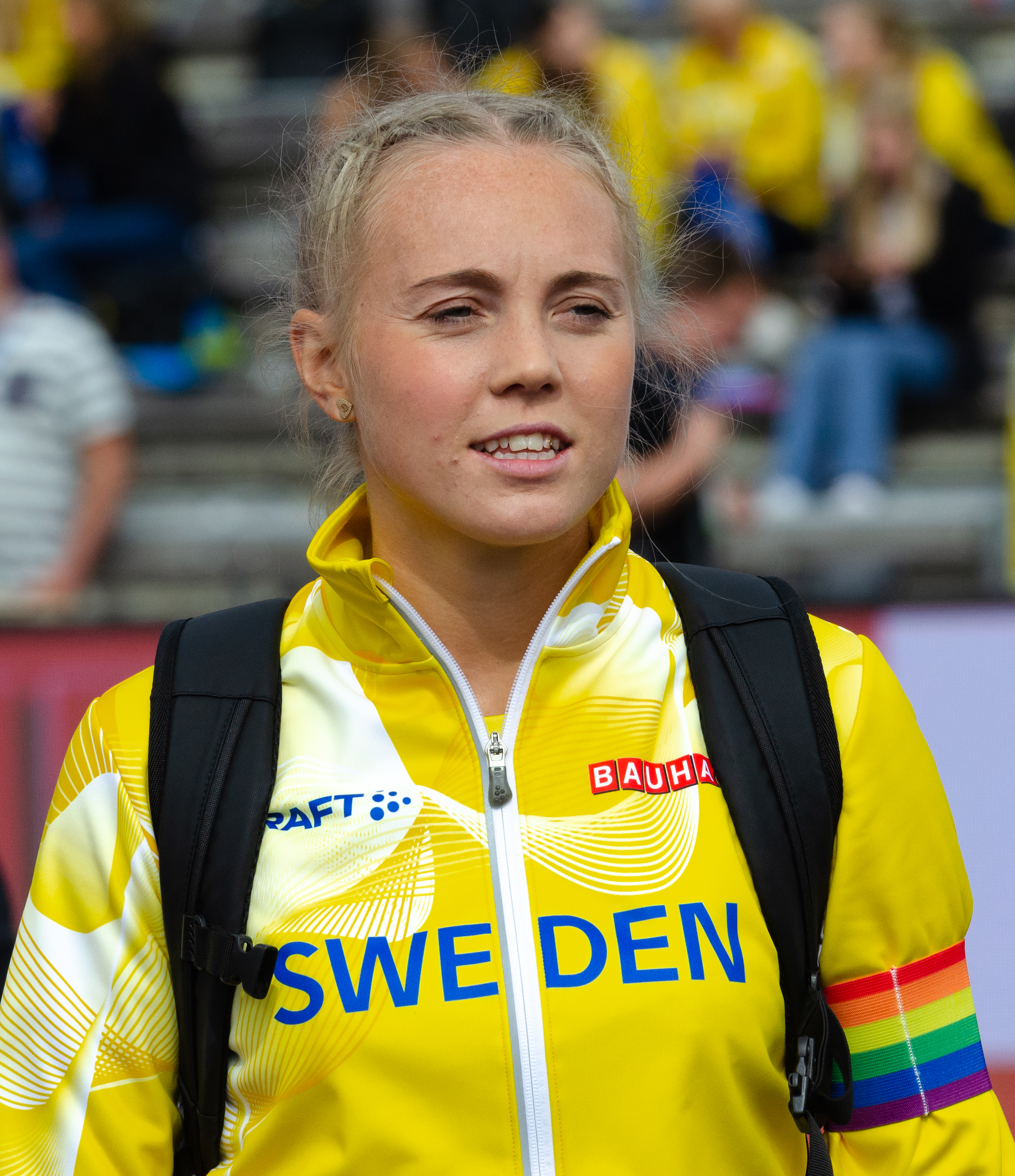
- Tilde Johansson at Finnkampen 2023 at Stockholm Olympic Stadium.

Personal information
- Born: 5 January 2001 (age 25)

Sport
- Country: Sweden
- Sport: Athletics
- Event(s): 100 m hurdles, long jump
Medal record
Women's athletics
Representing Sweden
European U20 Championships
Gold medal – first place	2019 Borås	100 m hurdles
Silver medal – second place	2019 Borås	long jump
European Youth Olympic Festival
Bronze medal – third place	2017 Győr	long jump
European U18 Championships
Gold medal – first place	2018 Győr	long jump
- Updated on 30 December 2019

Tilde Johansson (born 5 January 2001) is a Swedish athlete who competes in several disciplines. She competed in 60 metres hurdles at the 2019 European Athletics Indoor Championships in Glasgow. At the European Athletics U18 Championships 2018 she won the gold medal in long jump with 6,33 m. She competed at the 2019 World Athletics Championships in Doha, in the long jump event, where she finished at the 17th place in the qualification.

== Career ==
Tilde Johansson started as a soccer player, at the age of 14 she scored 49 goals for Skrea IF, over half of Division 4's 75 goals that season. The following year, in 2016, she became top scorer again this time in Division 3, reaching 25 goals. In the summer, she was called to the annual elite camp in Halmstad, where Sweden's most talented soccer players gather, but she declined and chose track and field instead.

Johansson began to make a name for herself in Swedish athletics circles in 2016, just turned 15, when she won the 200 meters at the Youth Indoor Championships with a margin of 0.85 seconds and set a new personal best with a time of 24.95 seconds. Later that year she participated in the F15 class in long jump at the World Youth Games held at Ullevi in Gothenburg in July. In the competition, in the second round she improved her personal best from 6.05 to 6.50 centimeters, which meant eighth place among Swedish seniors of all time and that she passed the qualification limit (5.95) for participation in the youth EC by a margin. However, she was a year too young to participate. At the youth championships in August, she won as favorite 300 meters in the F16 class.

In 2017, Johansson participated in both long jump and 100 meter hurdles at the European Youth Olympic Festival held in Győr, Hungary. In the long jump, she claimed a bronze with a length of 6.10 meters. In her heat of the hurdles, she was so disturbed by neighboring runners that she had to redo her race but was eliminated.

In 2018, Johansson participated in long jump at the U18 European Championships held in Györ in July. Here she took home the gold medal with 6.33 meters.

At the indoor WC in February 2019, Johansson won WC gold in the long jump, pentathlon, and 60 meter hurdles. At the indoor EC in Glasgow later in February, she was selected in the 60 meter hurdles, but was eliminated in the trial round. In July, she competed at the Junior EC in Borås. There she won a gold medal in the 100 meter hurdles and silver in the long jump. At the Athletics World Championships in Doha in October 2019, Johansson, as a debutant, was eliminated in the qualifiers after jumping 6.48 meters twice – 6.53 would have been enough for the final place.

== Personal life ==
Her sister Molly Johansson plays soccer in BK Häcken FF.

== Personal best ==
Event	Result	Venue	Date
Outdoor
100 m hurdles	13.16 s (wind: +0.1 m/s)	(Sweden) Borås	20 July 2019
Long jump	6.73 m (wind: +1.3 m/s)	(Sweden) Karlstad	3 July 2019
Indoor
60 m hurdles	8.14 s	(Sweden) Växjö	19 January 2019
Long jump	6.43 m	(Sweden) Norrköping	16 February 2019
