= Stadium Arena (Norrköping) =

Indoor arena in Norrköping, Sweden

Coordinates: 58°35′12″N 16°8′38″E

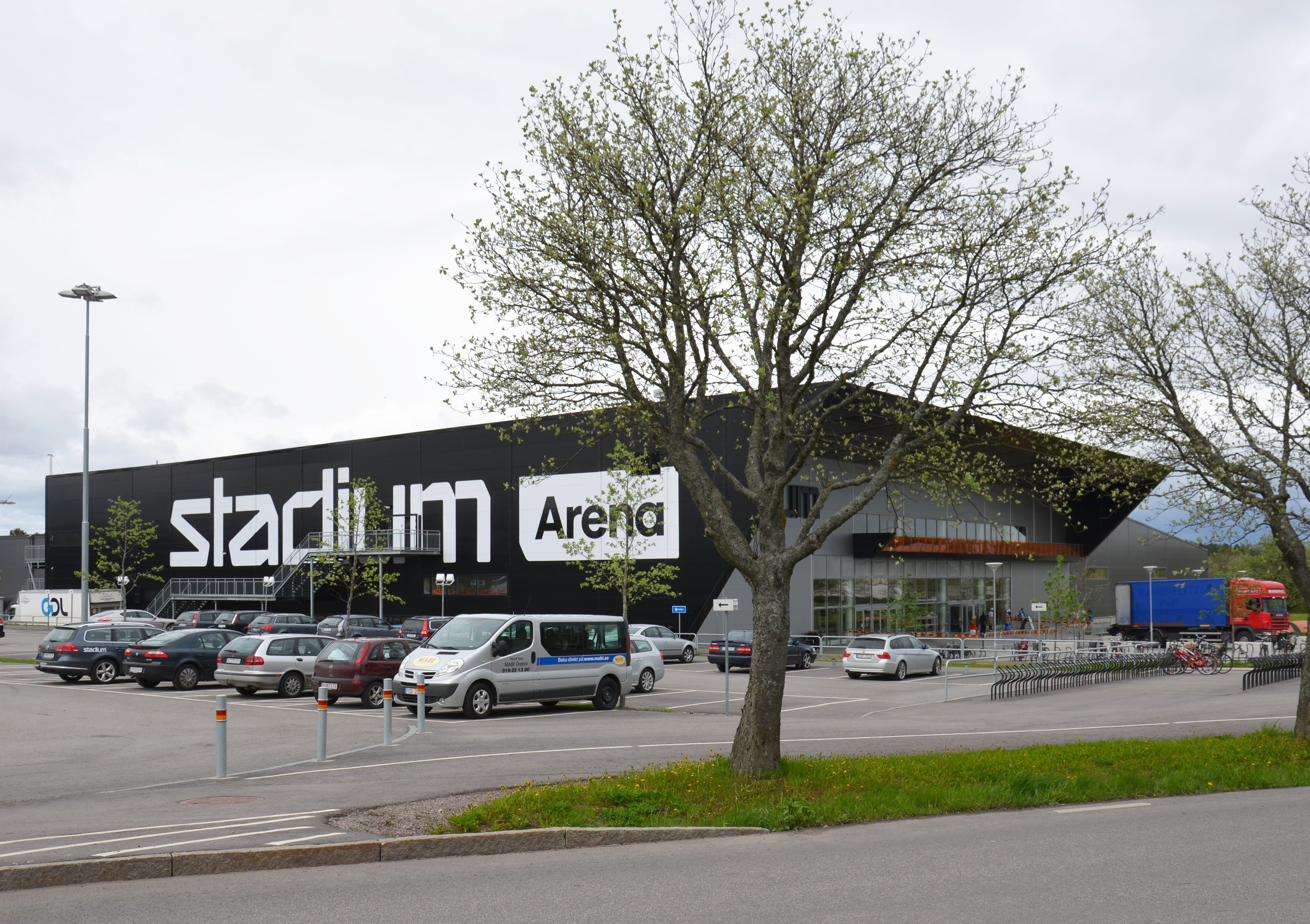
- Interactive map of Stadium Arena
- Location: Norrköping, Sweden
- Owner: Norrköping Arena AB via Norrköping Dolphins
- Capacity: Basketball: 3,500; Athletics: 1,500

Construction
- Built: 2006–2008
- Opened: 7 December 2008
- Architect: ÅWL Arkitekter

Tenant
- Norrköping Dolphins

Stadium Arena is an indoor sporting arena located in Norrköping, Sweden. The venue is mainly used for basketball, indoor athletics and concerts. The arena opened in December 2008 and it is the home venue for basketball club Norrköping Dolphins. Moreover, Stadium Arena is the national stadium of Swedish basketball. The basketball hall has a capacity of 3,500 spectators, while the athletics venue has a capacity of approximately 1,500 spectators.
