= Matteo Sioli =

Italian high jumper (born 2005)

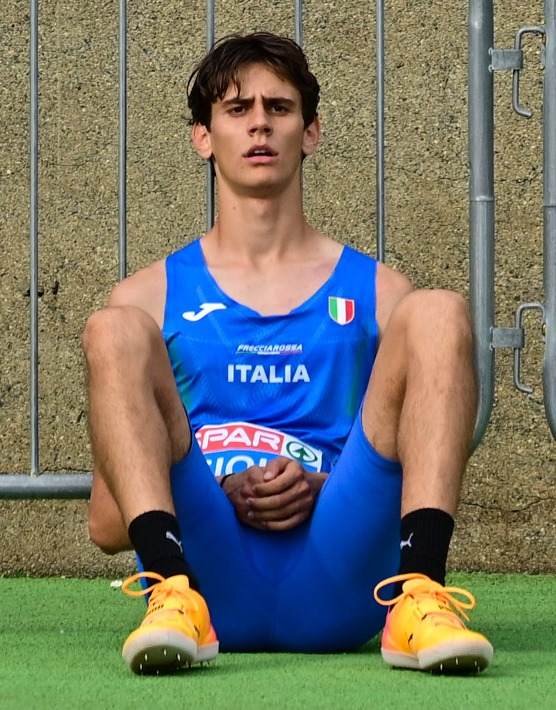
- Sioli in 2025

Personal information
- Born: 1 October 2005 (age 21)

Sport
- Sport: Athletics
- Event: High jump
- Club: Euroatletica 2002

Achievements and titles
- National finals: Italiano
- Personal bests: High jump: 2.30m (Apeldoorn, 2025)
Medal record
Men's athletics
Representing Italy
European Athletics Championships
Bronze medal – third place	2026 Birmingham	High jump
European Indoor Championships
Bronze medal – third place	2025 Apeldoorn	High jump
European U23 Championships
Gold medal – first place	2025 Bergen	High jump
World U20 Championships
Silver medal – second place	2024 Lima	High jump

Matteo Sioli (born 1 October 2005) is an Italian high jumper. He won the Italian Indoor Championships and was a bronze medalist at the European Indoor Championships in 2025. The following year, Sioli won the Italian Championships and was a bronze medalist at the 2026 European Championships.

The Italian junior record holder, he won the gold medal at the 2025 European Athletics U23 Championships and the silver medal at the 2024 World Athletics U20 Championships. He placed joint-eighth at the senior 2025 World Championships.

== Biography ==
He is from Paderno Dugnano in the Metropolitan City of Milan, Lombardy and is coached by Felice Delaini. He is a member of Paderno Dugnano of Euroatletica 2002. He finished sixth at the 2023 European Athletics U20 Championships in Jerusalem in July 2023.

He became Italian Junior champion both outdoors and indoors, and set a new personal best height of 2.21 metres in June 2024. He won the silver medal in the high jump at the 2024 World Athletics U20 Championships, in Lima, Peru, in August 2024, with a new personal best clearance of 2.23 metres.

He improved his personal best to 2.25 metres whilst competing in Parma, Italy, in December 2024, the highest jump ever reached by an Italian junior athlete. He achieved that height again, competing in Udine, Italy, in February 2025. Later that month, he won the Italian Athletics Indoor Championships with a new personal best jump of 2.28 metres, in Ancona. He was selected for the 2025 European Athletics Indoor Championships in Appeldoorn, Netherlands, in March 2025. Competing at the Championships, he won the bronze medal with a new personal best of 2.29 metres, equalling the jump of the silver medalist Czech jumper Jan Stefela who was awarded second place on countback, with both behind Oleh Doroshchuk of Ukraine, who cleared 2.34 metres, with Sioli's compatriot Manuel Lando in fourth place with 2.26 metres.

He cleared 2.15 metres to finish joint-sixth in May 2025 at the 2025 Doha Diamond League. The following week, he placed eighth overall at the 2025 Meeting International Mohammed VI d'Athlétisme de Rabat, also part of the 2025 Diamond League, in May 2025. He finished fifth with a jump of 2.23 metres at the Diamond League event at the 2025 Golden Gala in Rome on 6 June 2025. He finished second in the high jump at the 2025 European Athletics Team Championships First Division in Madrid on 28 June 2025. He set a new personal best of 2.30 metres to win the 2025 European Athletics U23 Championships in Bergen, Norway.

In September, he cleared 2.24 metres to place joint-eighth at the 2025 World Athletics Championships in Tokyo, Japan. In September 2025, he was nominated for the European Athletics male rising star award.

On 4 June 2026, he claimed his first victory in the Diamond League at the 2026 Golden Gala in Rome, where he cleared 2.28 metres to win ahead of Erick Portillo of Mexico. On 19 June. he won again with 2.29 metres, with home favourite Mutaz Barshim in second place, at the 2026 Doha Diamond League. In July, Sioli jumped 2.30 metres to win the high jump at the Italian Athletics Championships. On 14 August, he competed in the 2026 European Athletics Championships, coming third where he cleared 2.27 metres before retiring because of a left hamstring injury.

== National titles ==
Sioli won a national championships at individual senior level.

- Italian Athletics Indoor Championships
  - High jump: 2025
