= Turebergs FK =

Athletics club in Sweden

- Full name: Turebergs Friidrottsklubb
- Ground: Sollentunavallen; Sollentuna

Turebergs Friidrottsklubb is an athletics club based in Sollentuna Municipality, Stockholm County, Sweden.

Some athletes affiliated with it are Olympic high jump champion Kajsa Bergqvist and her coach Bengt Jönsson, sprinters Eric Josjö and Emil Johansson, and high jumper Thomas Eriksson.
