= Swedish Indoor Athletics Championships =

Annual track and field competition

- Sport: Indoor track and field
- Founded: 1984
- Country: Sweden

The Swedish Indoor Athletics Championships (Swedish: Svenska inomhusmästerskapen i friidrott) is an annual indoor track and field competition organised by the Swedish Athletics Association, which serves as the Swedish national championship for the sport. The competition started as a non–official standing jumps contest in 1960, held at the Johanneshovs Isstadion in Stockholm. It expanded to a full indoor track and field competition in 1966, then later attained national championship status in 1984.

== Events ==
The following athletics events feature as standard on the Swedish Indoor Championships programme:

- Sprint: 60 m, 200 m, 400 m
- Distance track events: 800 m, 1500 m, 3000 m
- Hurdles: 60 m hurdles
- Jumps: long jump, triple jump, high jump, pole vault
- Throws: shot put, weight throw
- Combined events: heptathlon (men), pentathlon (women)
- Walks: 5000 m walk (men), 3000 m walk (women)

From 1960 to 1965, the competition consisted of men's standing high jump and standing long jump for both men and women. A men's 2000 metres steeplechase was contested in 1972 and 1975. The 200 metres event was first contested in 1982 and combined track and field events were included in 1986. The men's 5000 m walk and women's 3000 m walk were contested for the first time in 1987. The weight throw was the last expansion, being added to the programme in 2000.

In earlier years, a smaller number of women's events were held. As the scope of women's international athletics increased, so did the national indoor programme. The women's 1500 metres was included in 1971, the 3000 metres in 1979, the triple jump in 1990, and the pole vault in 1996. The championships now has an equal number of men's and women's events.

== Editions ==
Year	Dates	Location	Venue	Ref.
1966	1–2 March	Johanneshov, Stockholm	Johanneshovs Isstadion	
1967	4–5 February	Johanneshov, Stockholm	Johanneshovs Isstadion	
1968	2–3 March	Gothenburg	Partihallarna	
1969	1–2 March	Johanneshov, Stockholm	Johanneshovs Isstadion	
1970	7–8 March	Gothenburg	Partihallarna	
1971	27–28 February	Johanneshov, Stockholm	Johanneshovs Isstadion	
1972	12–13 February	Gothenburg	Scandinavium	
1973	3–4 March	Falun	Lugnethallen	
1974	2–3 February	Falun	Lugnethallen	
1975	1–2 March	Gothenburg	Scandinavium	
1976	14–15 February	Falun	Lugnethallen	
1977	12–13 March	Falun	Lugnethallen	
1978	11–12 February	Falun	Lugnethallen	
1979	27–28 January	Gothenburg	Scandinavium	
1980	8–10 February	Gothenburg	Scandinavium	
1981	23–25 January	Gothenburg	Scandinavium	
1982	5–7 February	Gothenburg	Scandinavium	
1983	18–20 February	Malmö	Kombihallen	
1984	18–19 February	Solna	Solnahallen	
1985	8–10 February	Solna	Solnahallen	
1986	31 January–2 February	Solna	Solnahallen	
1987	30 January–1 February	Solna	Solnahallen	
1988	19–21 February	Haparanda	Aspenhallen	
1989	10–12 February	Solna	Solnahallen	
1990	16–18 February	Gothenburg	Friidrottens Hus	
1991	15–17 February	Luleå	Arcushallen	
1992	14–16 February	Gothenburg	Friidrottens Hus	
1993	19–21 February	Malmö	Atleticum	
1994	25–27 February	Växjö	Tipshallen	
1995	24–26 February	Malmö	Atleticum	
1996	16–18 February	Borlänge	Kupolen	
1997	15–16 February	Malmö	Atleticum	
1998	13–15 February	Eskilstuna	Munktellarenan	
1999	13–14 February	Sätra, Stockholm	Sätra Friidrottshall	
2000	5–6 February	Bollnäs	Höghammarhallen	
2001	17–18 February	Gothenburg	Friidrottens Hus	
2002	16–17 February	Malmö	Atleticum	
2003	1–2 March	Sätra, Stockholm	Sätra Friidrottshall	
2004	21–22 February	Gothenburg	Friidrottens Hus	
2005	12–13 February	Malmö	Atleticum	
2006	25–26 February	Sätra, Stockholm	Sätra Friidrottshall	
2007	24–25 February	Gothenburg	Friidrottens Hus	
2008	23–24 February	Malmö	Atleticum	
2009	28 February–1 March	Bollnäs	Höghammarhallen	
2010	27–28 February	Sätra, Stockholm	Sätra Friidrottshall	
2011	26–27 February	Gothenburg	Friidrottens Hus	
2012	18–19 February	Örebro	Tybblelundshallen	
2013	15–17 February	Norrköping	Stadium Arena	
2014	22–23 February	Gothenburg	Friidrottens Hus	
2015	21–22 February	Sätra, Stockholm	Sätra Friidrottshall	
2016	27–28 February	Malmö	Atleticum	
2017	25–26 February	Växjö	Telekonsult Arena	
2018	17–18 February	Gävle	Omegahallen	
2019	16–17 February	Norrköping	Stadium Arena	
2020	22–23 February	Växjö	Telekonsult Arena	
2021	19–21 February	Malmö	Atleticum	
2022	25–27 February	Växjö	Telekonsult Arena	
2023	17–19 February	Malmö	Atleticum	
2024	16–18 February	Karlstad	Eva Lisa Holtz Arena	
2025	22–23 February	Växjö	Telekonsult Arena	
2026	27 February–1 March	Sätra	Sätra Friidrottshall	

== Championship records ==
=== Men ===
Event	Record	Athlete	Club	Date	Place	Ref.
60 m	6.60	Henrik Larsson	IF Göta	16 February 2019	Norrköping	
60 m	6.60	Henrik Larsson	IF Göta	26 February 2022	Växjö	
200 m	20.50	Erik Erlandsson	Malmö AI	23 February 2025	Växjö	
400 m	46.26	Carl Bengtström	Örgryte IS	19 February 2023	Malmö	
800 m	1:46.75	Andreas Kramer	Ullevi FK	18 February 2023	Malmö	
1500 m	3:40.84	Andreas Kramer	Ullevi FK	27 February 2022	Växjö	
3000 m	7:36.38	Andreas Almgren	Turebergs FK	21 February 2025	Växjö	
60 m hurdles	7.59	Robert Kronberg	IF Kville	25 February 2007	Gothenburg	
High jump	2.38 m	Stefan Holm	Kils AIK	25 February 2007	Gothenburg	
High jump	2.38 m	Linus Thörnblad	Malmö AI	25 February 2007	Gothenburg	
Pole vault	5.70 m	Alhaji Jeng	Örgryte IS	23 February 2008	Malmö	
Pole vault	5.72 m (Note: Voss competed as a guest as he did not represent a Swedish club.)	Martin Voss	Aarhus Idrætsforening af 1900	25 February 1995	Malmö	
Long jump	8.22 m	Thobias Montler	Malmö AI	23 February 2020	Växjö	
Triple jump	17.60 m	Christian Olsson	Örgryte IS	16 February 2002	Malmö	
Shot put	21.49 m NR	Wictor Petersson	Malmö AI	22 February 2025	Växjö	
Discus throw	67.62 m	Daniel Ståhl		25 February 2022	Växjö	
Weight throw	23.24 m	Ragnar Carlsson	Hässelby SK	20 February 2021	Malmö	
Heptathlon	6018 pts	Fredrik Samuelsson	Hässelby SK	2–3 February 2019	Uppsala	
Heptathlon	60m / Long jump / Shot put / High jump / 60m H / Pole vault / 1000m; 7.14 / 7.43 m / 14.42 m / 2.07 m / 8.16 / 4.85 m / 2:43.19					
4 × 200 m relay	1:26.10	Johan Engberg; Simon Johansson; Fredrik Johansson; Christian Sjöberg	IF Göta	25 February 2007	Gothenburg	

=== Women ===
Event	Record	Athlete	Club	Date	Place	Ref.
60 m	7.17	Linda Haglund	Hanvikens SK	11 February 1978	Falun	
200 m	22.84 NR	Julia Henriksson	Malmö AI	23 February 2025	Växjö	
400 m	53.02	Moa Hjelmer	Spårvägens FK	19 February 2012	Örebro	
800 m	2:03.36	Anna Silvander	IFK Lidingö	22 February 2015	Sätra	
1500 m	4:10.39	Yolanda Ngarambe	Turebergs FK	18 February 2024	Karlstad	
3000 m	8:55.75	Meraf Bahta	Ullevi FK	25 February 2022	Växjö	
60 m hurdles	7.96	Susanna Kallur	Falu IK Friidrott	22 February 2004	Gothenburg	
High jump	2.00 m	Kajsa Bergqvist	Turebergs FK	2 March 2003	Sätra	
Pole vault	4.74 m	Angelica Bengtsson	Hässelby SK	22 February 2020	Växjö	
Long jump	6.85 m	Khaddi Sagnia	Ullevi FK	17 February 2018	Gävle	
Triple jump	13.95 m	Camilla Johansson	IFK Växjö	22 February 2004	Gothenburg	
Shot put	18.95 m	Fanny Roos	Malmö AI	26 February 2022	Växjö	
Weight throw	23.72 m	Ida Storm	Malmö AI	18 February 2018	Gävle	
Pentathlon	4476 pts	Jessica Samuelsson	Hässelby SK	7 March 2010	Sätra	
Pentathlon	60m H / High jump / Shot put / Long jump / 800m; 8.61 / 1.71 m / 14.77 m / 6.05 m / 2:14.04					
4 × 200 m relay	1:37.99	Pernilla Nilsson; Pernilla Tornemark; Linnea Killander; Josefin Magnusson	Malmö AI	28 February 2016	Malmö	
