= Sweden at the 2026 European Athletics Championships =

- WA code: SWE
- National federation: Swedish Athletics Association
- Website: www.friidrott.se

in Birmingham, United Kingdom
- Competitors: 64 (31 men and 33 women)
- Medals Ranked 8th: Gold 2 Silver 1 Bronze 2 Total 5

European Athletics Championships appearances
- 1934; 1938; 1946; 1950; 1954; 1958; 1962; 1966; 1969; 1971; 1974; 1978; 1982; 1986; 1990; 1994; 1998; 2002; 2006; 2010; 2012; 2014; 2016; 2018; 2022; 2024; 2026

Sweden competed at the 2026 European Athletics Championships in Birmingham, United Kingdom, between 10 and 16 August 2026. A delegation of 64 athletes (60 individual athletes and 4 relay competitors) is sent to represent the country.

== Medals ==
| Medal | Name | Event | Date |
|---|---|---|---|
| Gold | Andreas Almgren | Men's 10,000 metres | 15 August |
| Gold | Armand Duplantis | Men's pole vault | 16 August |
| Silver | Samuel Pihlström | Men's 1500 metres | 15 August |
| Bronze | Wictor Petersson | Men's shot put | 10 August |
| Bronze | Vanessa Kamga | Women s Discus throw | 14 August |

== Results ==
The following athletes are selected to compete by the Swedish Athletics Association.

- including alternates

Key

- Note–Ranks given for track events are within the athlete's heat only
- Q = Qualified by place in Track Events or by standard in Field Events
- q = Qualified by time in Track Events or without standard in Field Events
- qR= Advanced to the next round by referee.
- NR = National record
- CHB = Championship best
- WL = World Leading
- PB = Personal best
- SB = Season's best
- — = Round not applicable for the event
- Bye = Athlete not required to compete in round
- DNF = Did Not Finish (Running or Race Walking Events)
- DNS = Did not start
- DQ = Disqualified
- NM = No Mark (No valid trial recorded in Field Events

=== Men ===
Track and road events

| Athlete | Event | Heat | | Semifinal | | Final | |
| Athlete | Event | Result | Rank | Result | Rank | Result | Rank |
|---|---|---|---|---|---|---|---|
| Henrik Larsson | 100 m | 10.55 | 11 q | 10.36 | 5 | Did not advance | |
| Henrik Larsson | 200 m | Bye | | 20.48 | 5 | Did not advance | |
| Erik Erlandsson | 200 m | 20.89 | 9 q | 20.67 | 6 | Did not advance | |
| Linus Pihl | 200 m | 20.88 | 8 q | 20.79 | 5 | Did not advance | |
| Andreas Kramer | 800 m | 1:46.05 SB | 2 Q | 1:44.67 SB | 8 | Did not advance | |
| Samuel Pihlström | 1500 m | 3:41.84 | 3 Q | —N/a | | Silver | 3:36.16 |
| Andreas Almgren | 10,000 m | —N/a | | | | Gold | 27:23.44 CR SB |
| Archibald Casteel | Marathon | —N/a | | | | 47 | 2:23:34 |
| Ebba Tulu Chala | Marathon | —N/a | | | | 13 | 2:11:06 |
| Suldan Hassan | Marathon | —N/a | | | | 4 | 2:09:24 |
| Samuel Tsegay | Marathon | —N/a | | | | DNF | |
| Oskar Edlund | 400 m hurdles | Bye | | 47.61 NR | 1 Q | 48,36 | 4 |
| Vidar Johansson | 3000 m steeplechase | DNF | | —N/a | | Did not advance | |
| Leo Magnusson | 3000 m steeplechase | 8:35.12 | 5 Q | —N/a | | 10 | 8:32.87 |
| Simon Sundström | 3000 m steeplechase | DNF | | —N/a | | Did not advance | |
| Perseus Karlström | Marathon walk | —N/a | | | | 4 | 3:00:18 NR |
| Erik Erlandsson; Zion Eriksson; Filip Olsson; Linus Pihl; Johan Sjölander; Jean-Christian Zirignon | 4 × 100 m relay | 39.71 | 7 | —N/a | | Did not advance | |

Field events

| Athlete | Event | Qualification | | Final | |
| Athlete | Event | Distance | Position | Distance | Position |
|---|---|---|---|---|---|
| Melwin Lycke Holm | High jump | 2.19 | 14 | Did not advance | |
| William Asker | Pole vault | 5.45 | 15 | Did not advance | |
| Armand Duplantis | Pole vault | 5.60 | 1 q | Gold | 6,15 CR |
| Thobias Montler | Long jump | 7.90 | 13 | Did not advance | |
| Niklas Wall | Long jump | 7.53 | 23 | Did not advance | |
| Gabriel Wallmark | Triple jump | 15.89 | 16 | Did not advance | |
| Wictor Petersson | Shot put | 20.47 | 4 q | 20.97 | 3rd place, bronze medalist(s) |
| Leo Zikovic | Shot put | 19.31 | 15 | Did not advance | |
| Jesper Ahlin | Discus throw | 56.19 | 25 | Did not advance | |
| Daniel Ståhl | Discus throw | 63.95 | 5 q | 68.22 | 4 |
| Ragnar Carlsson | Hammer throw | 68.54 | 29 | Did not advance | |

Combined events – Decathlon

| Athlete | Event | 100 m | LJ | SP | HJ | 400 m | 110H | DT | PV | JT | 1500 m | Final | Rank |
|---|---|---|---|---|---|---|---|---|---|---|---|---|---|
| Emil Uhlin | Result | 11.27 | 6.72 SB | 13.12 | 2.05 SB | 49.11 | 15.03 | 42.49 | 5.00 SB | 52.22 SB | 4:23.75 | 7809 | 16 |
| Emil Uhlin | Points | 801 | 748 | 675 | 850 | 856 | 846 | 715 | 910 | 622 | 786 | 7809 | 16 |

=== Women ===
Track and road events

| Athlete | Event | Heat | | Semifinal | | Final | |
| Athlete | Event | Result | Rank | Result | Rank | Result | Rank |
|---|---|---|---|---|---|---|---|
| Wilma Svenson | 200 m | 23.30 =PB | 9 q | 23.30 =PB | 6 | Did not advance | |
| Elna Wester | 400 m | 52.28 PB | 12 q | 52.02 PB | 8 | Did not advance | |
| Mia Barnett | 1500 m | 24 | 4:14.01 | —N/a | | Did not advance | |
| Carmen Cernjul | 1500 m | 23 | 4:13.00 | —N/a | | Did not advance | |
| Wilma Nielsen | 1500 m | 13 | 4:10.50 | —N/a | | Did not advance | |
| Vera Sjöberg | 5000 m | —N/a | | | | 15:48.80 | 10 |
| Carolina Johnson | Marathon | —N/a | | | | 40 | 2:41:21 SB |
| Hanna Lindholm | Marathon | —N/a | | | | 25 | 2:36:42 SB |
| Samrawit Mengsteab | Marathon | —N/a | | | | DNF | |
| Tilde Bjerager | 400 m hurdles | 57.03 | 21 | Did not advance | | | |
| Moa Granat | 400 m hurdles | 56.11 SB | 2 q | 56.13 | 6 | Did not advance | |
| Emilia Lillemo | 3000 m steeplechase | 9:53.20 | 11 | —N/a | | Did not advance | |
| Julia Samuelsson | 3000 m steeplechase | 10:04.96 | 15 | —N/a | | Did not advance | |

Field events

| Athlete | Event | Qualification | | Final | |
| Athlete | Event | Distance | Position | Distance | Position |
|---|---|---|---|---|---|
| Ellen Ekholm | High jump | 1.88 SB | 19 | Did not advance | |
| Louise Ekman | High jump | 1.91 | 1 Q | 6 | 1,88 |
| Engla Nilsson | High jump | 1.84 | 26 | Did not advance | |
| Kajsa Roth | Pole vault | 4.50 PB | 7 q | 4.45 | 10 |
| Maja Åskag | Long jump | 6,66 | 9 q | 7 | 6,69 |
| Ayla Hallberg Hossain | Long jump | 6,66 | 10 q | DNS | |
| Tilde Johansson | Long jump | 6,47 | 20 | Did not advance | |
| Maja Åskag | Triple jump | 14.21 | 6 Q | 14.04 | 9 |
| Emilia Sjöstrand | Triple jump | 13.46 | 22 | Did not advance | |
| Axelina Johansson | Shot put | 18.29 | 7 Q | 18.18 | 10 |
| Fanny Roos | Shot put | 18.72 | 4 Q | 19.05 | 4 |
| Victoria Wickman | Shot put | 15.84 | 21 | Did not advance | |
| Vanessa Kamga | Discus throw | 64.65 | 1 Q | 64,61 | 3rd place, bronze medalist(s) |
| Caisa-Marie Lindfors | Discus throw | 59.57 | 10 q | 62,39 | 7 |
| Ebba Salomonsson Lind | Discus throw | 53.50 | 25 | Did not advance | |
| Grete Ahlberg | Hammer throw | 65.53 | 18 | Did not advance | |
| Malin Garbell | Hammer throw | 64.90 | 21 | Did not advance | |
| Patricia Kamga | Hammer throw | 67.26 | 16 | Did not advance | |
| Beatrice Lantz | Javelin throw | 51.06 | 29 | Did not advance | |

Combined events – Heptathlon

| Athlete | Event | 100H | HJ | SP | 200 m | LJ | JT | 800 m | Final | Rank |
|---|---|---|---|---|---|---|---|---|---|---|
| Lovisa Karlsson | Result | 13.03 | 1.71 | 13,25 | 24,30 | 6,08 | 38.89 | 2:20.23 | 16 | 6023 |
| Lovisa Karlsson | Points | 1120 | 867 | 744 | 952 | 874 | 646 | 820 | 16 | 6023 |
| Erika Wärff | Result | 13.83 | 1.74 | 13,92 | 24,85 | 5,95 | 47.14 | 2:23.46 | 17 | 6012 |
| Erika Wärff | Points | 1003 | 903 | 789 | 901 | 834 | 805 | 777 | 17 | 6012 |
