= Sweden at the 2012 European Athletics Championships =

- WA code: SWE
- National federation: Svenska Friidrottsförbundet
- Website: www.friidrott.se

in Helsinki
- Competitors: 41
- Medals Ranked 15th: Gold 1 Silver 0 Bronze 2 Total 3

European Athletics Championships appearances
- 1934; 1938; 1946; 1950; 1954; 1958; 1962; 1966; 1969; 1971; 1974; 1978; 1982; 1986; 1990; 1994; 1998; 2002; 2006; 2010; 2012; 2014; 2016; 2018; 2022; 2024; 2026

Sweden competed at the 2012 European Athletics Championships in Helsinki, Finland, from 27 June to 1 July 2012.

== Medals ==
Medal	Athlete	Event	Date
Gold	Moa Hjelmer	Women's 400 metres	29 June
Bronze	Emma Green Tregaro	Women's high jump	28 June
Bronze	Michel Tornéus	Men's long jump	1 July

== Results ==
=== Men ===
==== Track ====
Event	Athletes	Heats		Semifinal		Final	
Event	Athletes	Result	Rank	Result	Rank	Result	Rank
100 m	Stefan Tärnhuvud	10.35	13	10.47	15	DNQ	
200 m	Nil de Oliveira	20.78	7	28.83	5	21.11	5
400 m	Johan Wissman	46.43	14	46.35	10	DNQ	
800 m	Johan Rogestedt	1:48.86	29	DNQ			
800 m	Johan Svensson	1:48.21	19	DNQ			
5000 m	Adil Bouafif	—N/a				13:50.13	13
10000 m	Adil Bouafif	—N/a				29:07.31	14
10000 m	Mustafa Mohamed	—N/a				DNF	—
110 m hurdles	Philip Nossmy	13.56	6	13.47	7	13.59	7
4 x 100 m relay	David Sennung; Benjamin Olsson; Tom Kling-Baptiste; Stefan Tärnhuvud	39.87	11	—N/a		DNQ	

==== Field ====
Event	Athletes	Qualification		Final	
Event	Athletes	Result	Rank	Result	Rank
Pole vault	Alhaji Jeng	NM	—	DNQ	
Long jump	Andreas Otterling	NM	—	DNQ	
Long jump	Michel Tornéus	8.07	2	8.17	Bronze medal
Shot put	Leif Arrhenius	19.33	13	DNQ	
Discus throw	Leif Arrhenius	60.49	18	DNQ	
Discus throw	Niklas Arrhenius	59.02	22	DNQ	
Hammer throw	Mattias Jons	72.85	12	74.56	6
Javelin throw	Kim Amb	80.69	5	79.03	7
Javelin throw	Gabriel Wallin	78.89	12	77.18	8

==== Combined events ====
Event	Athlete	Event	Result	Points	Rank
Decathlon	Björn Barrefors	100 m	11.02	856	9
Decathlon	Björn Barrefors	Long jump	7.17	854	10
Decathlon	Björn Barrefors	Shot put	13.06	671	22
Decathlon	Björn Barrefors	High jump	1.97	776	9
Decathlon	Björn Barrefors	400 m	49.90	819	15
Decathlon	Björn Barrefors	110 m hurdles	14.83	870	17
Decathlon	Björn Barrefors	Discus throw	39.80	660	15
Decathlon	Björn Barrefors	Pole vault	4.90	880	5
Decathlon	Björn Barrefors	Javelin throw	49.03	574	18
Decathlon	Björn Barrefors	1500 m	4:56.97	577	18
Decathlon	Björn Barrefors	Final	—N/a	7537	16
Decathlon	Marcus Nilsson	100 m	11.53	476	26
Decathlon	Marcus Nilsson	Long jump	6.60	720	23
Decathlon	Marcus Nilsson	Shot put	13.63	706	16
Decathlon	Marcus Nilsson	High jump	1.88	696	19
Decathlon	Marcus Nilsson	400 m	49.94	817	17
Decathlon	Marcus Nilsson	110 m hurdles	16.65	629	21
Decathlon	Marcus Nilsson	Discus throw	40.93	683	11
Decathlon	Marcus Nilsson	Pole vault	4.40	731	18
Decathlon	Marcus Nilsson	Javelin throw	54.14	650	13
Decathlon	Marcus Nilsson	1500 m	4:23.79	786	2
Decathlon	Marcus Nilsson	Final	—N/a	7164	18
Decathlon	Petter Olson	100 m	11.02	856	9
Decathlon	Petter Olson	Long jump	7.04	823	17
Decathlon	Petter Olson	Shot put	13.40	692	17
Decathlon	Petter Olson	High jump	1.94	749	17
Decathlon	Petter Olson	400 m	49.01	861	9
Decathlon	Petter Olson	110 m hurdles	14.63	895	9
Decathlon	Petter Olson	Discus throw	39.41	653	16
Decathlon	Petter Olson	Pole vault	4.80	849	7
Decathlon	Petter Olson	Javelin throw	56.26	682	9
Decathlon	Petter Olson	1500 m	4:35.13	711	11
Decathlon	Petter Olson	Final	—N/a	7771	10

=== Women ===
==== Track ====
Event	Athletes	Heats		Semifinal		Final	
Event	Athletes	Result	Rank	Result	Rank	Result	Rank
400 m	Moa Hjelmer	52.33	4	51.40	2	51.13	Gold medal
400 m	Josefin Magnusson	55.01	26	DNQ			
800 m	Viktoria Tegenfeldt	2:05.74	15	—N/a		DNQ	
1500 m	Viktoria Tegenfeldt	DNS					
400 m hurdles	Frida Persson	57.83	21	DNQ			
4 x 100 m relay	Julia Skugge; Erica Jarder; Freja Jernstig; Lena Berntsson	DSQ	—	—N/a		DNQ	

==== Field ====
Event	Athletes	Qualification		Final	
Event	Athletes	Result	Rank	Result	Rank
Long jump	Carolina Klüft	DNS			
High jump	Emma Green Tregaro	1.90	1	1.92	Bronze medal
High jump	Ebba Jungmark	1.90	11	1.85	10
Pole vault	Angelica Bengtsson	4.40	11	4.30	10
Pole vault	Malin Dahlström	3.95	26	DNQ	
Shot put	Helena Engman	16.88	10	17.64	8
Hammer throw	Tracey Andersson	66.65	13	DNQ	

==== Combined events ====
Event	Athlete	Result	Event	Points	Rank
Heptathlon	Jessica Samuelsson	100 m hurdles	13.92	990	11
Heptathlon	Jessica Samuelsson	High jump	1.77	941	8
Heptathlon	Jessica Samuelsson	Shot put	14.91	855	2
Heptathlon	Jessica Samuelsson	200 m	24.36	952	3
Heptathlon	Jessica Samuelsson	Long jump	6.18	905	7
Heptathlon	Jessica Samuelsson	Javelin throw	38.34	635	14
Heptathlon	Jessica Samuelsson	800 m	2:08.70	984	1
Heptathlon	Jessica Samuelsson	Final	—N/a	6262	5

== Sources ==
- Swedish Athletic Association
