= Sweden at the 2010 European Athletics Championships =

- WA code: SWE
- National federation: Svenska Friidrottsförbundet
- Website: www.friidrott.se

in Barcelona
- Competitors: 41
- Medals Ranked 20th: Gold 0 Silver 1 Bronze 1 Total 2

European Athletics Championships appearances
- 1934; 1938; 1946; 1950; 1954; 1958; 1962; 1966; 1969; 1971; 1974; 1978; 1982; 1986; 1990; 1994; 1998; 2002; 2006; 2010; 2012; 2014; 2016; 2018; 2022; 2024; 2026

Sweden was represented by 41 athletes at the 2010 European Athletics Championships held in Barcelona, Spain, from 27 July to 1 August 2010.

== Participants ==
Event	Men	Women
100 m	Tom Kling Baptiste	Lena Berntsson
200 m	Johan Wissman	Elin Backman
400 m	Johan Wissman	Helene Nordquist
800 m	Mattias Claesson; Anton Asplund; Joni Jaako	
1500 m	Rizak Dirshe	Charlotte Schönbeck
5000 m	Oskar Käck; Johan Wallerstein	
3000 st.	Mustafa Mohamed	Ulrika Johansson
110 hurdles	Philip Nossmy; Robert Kronberg	
100 hurdles		Susanna Kallur
400 m hurdles		Sofie Persson
Marathon	Lars Johansson; Erik Petersson; Kristoffer Österlund; Adil Bouafif	Isabellah Andersson; Lena Gavelin; Anna von Schenck; Gabriella Samuelsson
High Jump	Linus Thörnblad	Emma Green; Ebba Jungmark
Pole Vault	Alhaji Jeng	Hanna-Mia Persson
Long Jump	Michel Tornéus	Carolina Klüft
Triple Jump	Christian Olsson	
Shot Put	Niklas Arrhenius	Helena Engman
Discus Throw	Niklas Arrhenius	Anna Söderberg; Sofia Larsson
Hammer Throw	Mattias Jons	Tracey Andersson
Javelin Throw	Gabriel Wallin	
Decathlon	Nicklas Wiberg; Daniel Almgren	
Heptathlon		Jessica Samuelsson; Nadja Casadei
4 × 100 m relay		Lena Berntsson; Emma Rienas; Elin Backman; Moa Hjelmer

== Results ==
2010 Barcelona	Gold	Silver	Bronze	Total
Sweden (SWE)	0	1	1	2

=== Men ===
Track and road events

Event	Athletes	Heats		Semifinal		Final	
Event	Athletes	Result	Rank	Result	Rank	Result	Rank
100 m	Tom Kling-Baptiste	10,64	6	-	-	-	29

Field events

Event	Athletes	Qualification		Final	
Event	Athletes	Result	Rank	Result	Rank
Hammer throw	Mattias Jons	74,56	8	NM	12/-

=== Women ===
Track and road events

Event	Athletes	Heats		Semifinal		Final	
Event	Athletes	Result	Rank	Result	Rank	Result	Rank
400 m hurdles	Sofie Persson	57,23	7	-	-	-	21

Field events

Event	Athletes	Qualification		Final	
Event	Athletes	Result	Rank	Result	Rank
Shot put	Helena Engman	17,55	14	18,11	9

Event	Athletes	Qualification		Final	
Event	Athletes	Result	Rank	Result	Rank
Long jump	Carolina Klüft	6,61	12	6,33	11
