= Sweden at the 2006 European Athletics Championships =

- WA code: SWE
- National federation: Svenska Friidrottsförbundet
- Website: www.friidrott.se

in Gothenburg
- Competitors: 74
- Medals Ranked 6th: Gold 3 Silver 1 Bronze 2 Total 6

European Athletics Championships appearances
- 1934; 1938; 1946; 1950; 1954; 1958; 1962; 1966; 1969; 1971; 1974; 1978; 1982; 1986; 1990; 1994; 1998; 2002; 2006; 2010; 2012; 2014; 2016; 2018; 2022; 2024

Sweden, as the hosting nation, sent as many as 74 athletes to the 2006 European Athletics Championships. The squad included three Olympic champions from Athens 2004, the heptathlete Carolina Klüft, the high jumper Stefan Holm and the triple jumper Christian Olsson.

== Results ==
2006 Gothenburg	Gold	Silver	Bronze	Total
Sweden (SWE)	3	1	2	6

List of Swedish results, where Athletes reached the Final in that event. (Heats/Quarter-Finals/Semi-Final scores will not be recorded)

Place	Athlete	Event	Result
1	Carolina Klüft	Heptathlon W	6740 p
1	Susanna Kallur	100 m hurdles W	12.59
1	Christian Olsson	Triple Jump M	17.67 m
2	Johan Wissman	200 m M	20.38
3	Stefan Holm	High jump M	2.34 m
3	Kajsa Bergqvist	High jump W	2.01 m
4	Linus Thörnblad	High jump M	2.34 m
7	Jenny Kallur	100 m hurdles W	12.94
9	Rizak Dirshe	1500 m	3.42.87
10	Camilla Johansson	Triple jump W	13.74 m
10	Magnus Arvidsson	Javelin M	78.53 m
22	Monica Svensson	20 km walk W	1.38.25

== Competitors ==
=== Men ===
100 m: Daniel Persson
200 m: Johan Wissman, Johan Engberg
400 m: Thomas Nikitin
800 m: Mattias Claesson
1500 m: Joel Bodén, Rizak Dirshe
5000 m: Henrik Skoog
Marathon: Said Regragui, Kristian Algers, Marek Poszepcynski, Kristoffer Österlund, Alfred Shemweta, Kent Claesson
110 m hurdles: Robert Kronberg, Joakim Blaschke
3,000 m steeplechase: Mustafa Mohammed, Henrik Skoog
50 km walk: Fredrik Svensson
Javelin: Magnus Arvidsson, Daniel Ragnvaldsson
Discus: Niklas Arrhenius
Shot put: Jimmy Nordin, Stefan Blomqvist
Triple Jump: Christian Olsson
High jump: Stefan Holm, Linus Thörnblad
Pole vault: Alhaji Jeng, Oscar Janson, Jesper Fritz, Gustaf Hultgren
Decathlon: Nicklas Wiberg
4 × 100 m: Daniel Persson, Christoffer Sandin, Stefan Tärnhuvud, Johan Engberg, Patrik Lövgren
4 × 400 m: Fredrik Johansson, Thomas Nikitin, Joni Jaako, Andreas Mokdasi, Johan Wissman

=== Women ===
100 m: Emma Rienas
400 m: Lena Aruhn, Beatrice Dahlgren
100 m hurdles: Susanna Kallur, Jenny Kallur
400 m hurdles: Anneli Melin, Nadja Petersen, Erica Mårtensson
Marathon: Anna Rahm, Lena Gavelin, Lisa Blommé
3,000 m steeplechase: Ida Nilsson, Christin Johansson, Ebba Stenbäck Morrison
20 km walk: Monica Svensson
High jump: Kajsa Bergqvist, Emma Green
Triple jump: Camilla Johansson
Long jump: Carolina Klüft, Daniela Lincoln Saavedra
Pole vault: Hanna-Mia Persson, Linda Persson, Maria Rendin
Discus: Anna Söderberg
Hammer throw: Cecilia Nilsson, Tracey Andersson
Javelin: Annika Petersson
Shot put: Helena Engman
Heptathlon: Carolina Klüft, Jessica Samuelsson
4 × 100 m: Susanna Kallur, Jenny Kallur, Carolina Klüft, Emma Green, Emma Rienas
4 × 400 m: Lena Aruhn, Beatrice Dahlgren, Emma Björkman, Emma Agerbjer, Jessica Samuelsson
