= Sweden at the 2014 European Athletics Championships =

- WA code: SWE
- National federation: Svenska Friidrottsförbundet
- Website: www.friidrott.se

in Zürich
- Competitors: 60 in 35 events
- Medals: Gold 1 Silver 2 Bronze 0 Total 3

European Athletics Championships appearances
- 1934; 1938; 1946; 1950; 1954; 1958; 1962; 1966; 1969; 1971; 1974; 1978; 1982; 1986; 1990; 1994; 1998; 2002; 2006; 2010; 2012; 2014; 2016; 2018; 2022; 2024

Sweden competed at the 2014 European Athletics Championships in Zürich, Switzerland, from 12–17 August 2013. A delegation of 60 athletes were sent to represent the country.

The following athletes has been selected to compete by the Swedish Athletics Federation. Marathon-runner Isabellah Andersson was nominated but withdrew from participation due to injury. Hurdler-runner Philip Nossmy has also withdrawn.

== Medals ==
Medal	Name	Event	Date
Gold	Meraf Bahta	Women's 5000 metres	16 August
Silver	Abeba Aregawi	Women's 1500 metres	15 August
Silver	Charlotta Fougberg	Women's 3000 metres steeplechase	17 August

== Men ==
=== Track and road ===
Event	Athletes	Heats		Semifinal		Final	
Event	Athletes	Result	Rank	Result	Rank	Result	Rank
100 metres	Patrik Andersson	10.61	=32	Did not advance			
100 metres	Tom Kling-Baptiste	10.50	29	Did not advance			
100 metres	Odain Rose	10.53	30	Did not advance			
200 metres	Nil de Oliveira	20.93	20	Did not advance			
200 metres	Johan Wissman	20.82	18	Did not advance			
400 metres	Johan Wissman	46.93	33	Did not advance			
800 metres	Andreas Almgren	1:48.22	14 Q	1:47.55	10	Did not advance	
800 metres	Rickard Gunnarsson	1:50.58	32	Did not advance			
800 metres	Johan Rogestedt	1:48.19	13 q	1:53.70	16	Did not advance	
1500 metres	Jonas Leandersson	3:49.64	27	—		Did not advance	
10,000 metres	Adil Bouafif	—				DNF	—
10,000 metres	Mikael Ekvall	—				30:04.93	16
Marathon	Patrik Engström	—				DNF	—
Marathon	Fredrik Johansson	—				2:23:10	38
Marathon	Emil Lerdahl	—				2:27:17	47
Marathon	Mostafa Mohamed	—				2:19:29	25
Marathon	David Nilsson	—				DNF	—
Marathon	Daniel Woldu	—				DNF	—
110 m hurdles	Alexander Brorsson	13.92	26	Did not advance			
3000 m steeplechase	Daniel Lundgren	8:43.98	20	—		Did not advance	
4 x 100 metres relay	Tom Kling-Baptiste; Stefan Tärnhuvud; Alexander Brorsson; Erik Hagberg	39.27	10	—		Did not advance	
20 km race walk	Andreas Gustafsson	—				DNF	—
20 km race walk	Perseus Karlström	—				1:24.41	17
50 km race walk	Andreas Gustafsson	—				DQ	—
50 km race walk	Ato Ibáñez	—				3:48.42	10
50 km race walk	Perseus Karlström	—				DNS	—

=== Field events ===
Event	Athletes	Qualification		Final	
Event	Athletes	Distance	Position	Distance	Position
Pole vault	Alhaji Jeng	DNS	—	Did not advance	
Pole vault	Melker Svärd Jacobsson	5.30	19	Did not advance	
Long jump	Michel Tornéus	7.81	9 q		
Shot put	Leif Arrhenius	19.54	17	Did not advance	
Discus throw	Niklas Arrhenius	NM	—	Did not advance	
Discus throw	Axel Härstedt	61.51	12 q	60.01	12
Discus throw	Daniel Ståhl	59.01	24	Did not advance	
Hammer throw	Markus Johansson	69.21	20	Did not advance	
Javelin throw	Kim Amb	NM	—	Did not advance	
Javelin throw	Gabriel Wallin	73.16	26	Did not advance	

Combined events – Decathlon

Athlete	Event	100 m	LJ	SP	HJ	400 m	110H	DT	PV	JT	1500 m	Final	Rank
Marcus Nilsson	Result	11.30	6.59	14.93	1.89	DNS	Did not finish						—
Marcus Nilsson	Points	795	718	785	705	DNS	Did not finish						—
Fabian Rosenquist	Result	11.19	7.51	12.05	1.98	48.86	15.03	40.82	4.50	45.92	4:34.79	7546	19
Fabian Rosenquist	Points	819	937	609	785	868	846	681	760	528	713	7546	19

== Women ==
=== Track and road ===
Event	Athletes	Heats		Semifinal		Final	
Event	Athletes	Result	Rank	Result	Rank	Result	Rank
100 metres	Daniella Busk	11.76	31	Did not advance			
200 metres	Irene Ekelund	23.38	=15 Q	23.26	=13	Did not advance	
800 metres	Lovisa Lindh	2:01.73	=7 Q	2:02.60	12	Did not advance	
1500 metres	Abeba Aregawi	4:11.64	9 Q	—		4:05.08	2nd place, silver medalist(s)
5000 metres	Meraf Bahta	—				15:31.39	1st place, gold medalist(s)
Marathon	Lena Eliasson	—				2:43:12	38
Marathon	Annelie Johansson	—				2:42:04	30
Marathon	Charlotte Karlsson	—				2:42:29	34
Marathon	Hanna Lindholm	—				2:44:05	42
Marathon	Frida Lundén	—				2:42:18	32
3000 m steeplechase	Charlotta Fougberg	9:52.04	9 Q	—		9:30.16	2nd place, silver medalist(s)
4 x 100 metres relay	Irene Ekelund; Isabelle Eurenius; Daniella Busk; Pernilla Nilsson; Hanna Adriansson*	43.80	8 q	—		44.36	6

=== Field events ===
Event	Athletes	Qualification		Final	
Event	Athletes	Distance	Position	Distance	Position
High jump	Emma Green	1.89	=7 q	1.90	=9
Pole vault	Angelica Bengtsson	4.45	5 q	4.45	5
Long jump	Erica Jarder	6.52	10 q	6.39	8
Shot put	Frida Åkerström	14.98	16	Did not advance	
Discus throw	Sofia Larsson	54.22	11 q	51.81	11
Discus throw	Julia Wiberg	52.40	15	Did not advance	
Hammer throw	Tracey Andersson	65.72	14	Did not advance	
Hammer throw	Ida Storm	60.82	21	Did not advance	
Javelin throw	Sofi Flink	57.53	12 Q	56.68	12

Combined events – Heptathlon

Athlete	Event	100H	HJ	SP	200 m	LJ	JT	800 m	Final	Rank
Jessica Samuelsson	Result	14.10	1.76	14.50	24.74	NM	41.01	DNS	DNF	—
Jessica Samuelsson	Points	964	928	827	911	0	687	DNS	DNF	—

Key

Q = Qualified for the next round; q = Qualified for the next round as a fastest loser or, in field events, by position without achieving the qualifying target; N/A = Round not applicable for the event
