= Sweden at the 2016 European Athletics Championships =

- WA code: SWE
- National federation: Svenska Friidrottsförbundet
- Website: www.friidrott.se

in Amsterdam, Netherlands
- Competitors: 60
- Medals: Gold 0 Silver 2 Bronze 2 Total 4

European Athletics Championships appearances
- 1934; 1938; 1946; 1950; 1954; 1958; 1962; 1966; 1969; 1971; 1974; 1978; 1982; 1986; 1990; 1994; 1998; 2002; 2006; 2010; 2012; 2014; 2016; 2018; 2022; 2024

Sweden competed at the 2016 European Athletics Championships in Amsterdam, Netherlands, from 6–10 July 2016. The Swedish federation has nominated a total of 62 athletes to compete at the championships.

== Medalists ==
Medal	Name	Event	Date
Silver	Michel Tornéus	Men's long jump	7 July
Silver	Meraf Bahta	Women's 5000 metres	9 July
Bronze	Angelica Bengtsson	Women's pole vault	9 July
Bronze	Lovisa Lindh	Women's 800 metres	9 July

== Men ==
=== Track and road ===
Event	Athletes	Heats		Semifinal		Final	
Event	Athletes	Result	Rank	Result	Rank	Result	Rank
200 metres	Tom Kling-Baptiste	21.06	=13 q	21.34	22	did not advance	
200 metres	Johan Wissman	20.96	8 q	DNF	–	did not advance	
800 metres	Kalle Berglund	1:49.65	18	did not advance			
1500 metres	Jonas Leandersson	3:44.09	24	—		did not advance	
1500 metres	Johan Rogestedt	DSQ	–	—		did not advance	
3000 m steeplechase	Emil Blomberg	8:34.41 PB	14 q	—		8:48.98	13
3000 m steeplechase	Elmar Engholm	8:55.21	21	—		did not advance	
Half marathon	Mikael Ekvall	—					
Half marathon	Mustafa Mohamed	—					
Half marathon	David Nilsson	—					
Half marathon	Fredrik Uhrbom	—					
4 × 100 m relay	Emil von Barth; Tom Kling-Baptiste; Austin Hamilton; Johan Wissman; Erik Hagberg (reserve)	39.37	11	—		did not advance	
4 × 400 m relay	Axel Bergrahm; Erik Martinsson; Felix Francois; Adam Danielsson; Dennis Forsman (reserve)	3:04.95	11	—		did not advance	

=== Field ===
Event	Athletes	Qualification		Final	
Event	Athletes	Distance	Position	Distance	Position
Pole vault	Melker Svärd Jacobsson	5.50	=9 q	DNS	–
Long jump	Michel Tornéus	8.19w	1 Q	8.21w	2nd place, silver medalist(s)
Shot put	Leif Arrhenius	18.64	=23	did not advance	
Discus throw	Niklas Arrhenius	61.63	19	did not advance	
Discus throw	Axel Härstedt	NM	–	did not advance	
Discus throw	Daniel Ståhl	65.78	2 Q	64.77	5
Javelin throw	Kim Amb	80.70	12 q	79.36	7
Javelin throw	Gabriel Wallin	76.00	23	did not advance	

Combined events – Decathlon

Athlete	Event	100 m	LJ	SP	HJ	400 m	110H	DT	PV	JT	1500 m	Final	Rank
Markus Nilsson	Result												
Markus Nilsson	Points												
Fredrik Samuelsson	Result												
Fredrik Samuelsson	Points												

== Women ==
=== Track and road ===
Event	Athletes	Heats		Semifinal		Final	
Event	Athletes	Result	Rank	Result	Rank	Result	Rank
200 metres	Pernilla Nilsson	24.18	25	did not advance			
800 metres	Lovisa Lindh	2:01.77	2 Q	2:00.66	3 q	2:00.37 PB	3rd place, bronze medalist(s)
800 metres	Anna Silvander	2:03.95	13 Q	2:03.37	22	did not advance	
5000 metres	Meraf Bahta	—				15:20.54	2nd place, silver medalist(s)
10,000 metres	Sarah Lahti	—				32:14.17	9
100 m hurdles	Susanna Kallur	13.01	2 Q	12.96	8	did not advance	
100 m hurdles	Elin Westerlund	DNF	–	did not advance			
400 m hurdles	Frida Persson	58.26	18	did not advance			
3000 m steeplechase	Maria Larsson	9:50.16 PB	19	—		did not advance	
Half marathon	Frida Lundén	—					
Half marathon	Emma Nordling	—					
Half marathon	Cecilia Norrbom	—					
4 × 100 m relay	Elin Östlund; Emilia Killander; Isabelle Eurenius; Pernilla Nilsson; Gladys Bamane (reserve)	44.27	11	—		did not advance	

=== Field ===
Event	Athletes	Qualification		Final	
Event	Athletes	Distance	Position	Distance	Position
High jump	Erika Kinsey	1.85	22	did not advance	
High jump	Sofie Skoog	1.89	=5 q	1.89	=9
Pole vault	Angelica Bengtsson	4.45	8 q	4.65	3rd place, bronze medalist(s)
Pole vault	Lisa Gunnarsson	4.00	=23	did not advance	
Pole vault	Michaela Meijer	4.45	7 q	4.55	5
Long jump	Erica Jarder	6.33	=19	did not advance	
Long jump	Malin Marmbrandt	6.33w	=19	did not advance	
Long jump	Khaddi Sagnia	6.47	10 q	6.59	6
Shot put	Fanny Roos	16.11	20	did not advance	
Discus throw	Sofia Larsson	56.02	16	did not advance	
Discus throw	Julia Viberg	52.82	24	did not advance	
Hammer throw	Tracey Andersson	68.08	11 q	67.08	11
Hammer throw	Marinda Petersson	64.65	23	did not advance	
Javelin throw	Sofi Flink	54.38	23	did not advance	
Javelin throw	Anna Wessman	54.02	24	did not advance	
