= Sweden at the 2024 European Athletics Championships =

- Flag of Sweden
- WA code: SWE

in Rome, Italy 7 June 2024 – 12 June 2024
- Competitors: 58 (31 men and 27 women)
- Medals Ranked 11th: Gold 2 Silver 0 Bronze 1 Total 3

European Athletics Championships appearances
- 1934; 1938; 1946; 1950; 1954; 1958; 1962; 1966; 1969; 1971; 1974; 1978; 1982; 1986; 1990; 1994; 1998; 2002; 2006; 2010; 2012; 2014; 2016; 2018; 2022; 2024

Sweden competed at the 2024 European Athletics Championships in Rome, Italy from 7–12 June 2024.

== Medallists ==
Medal	Name	Event	Date
Gold	Perseus Karlström	Men's 20 kilometres walk	8 June
Gold	Armand Duplantis	Men's pole vault	12 June
Bronze	Carl Bengtström	Men's 400 metres hurdles	11 June

== Results ==
Sweden entered the following athletes.

Key

- Q = Qualified for the next round
- q = Qualified for the next round as a fastest loser or, in field events, by position without achieving the qualifying target
- NR = National record
- PB = Personal best
- SB = Season best
- N/A = Round not applicable for the event

=== Men ===
Track and road events

Athlete	Event	Heat		Semifinal		Final	
Athlete	Event	Result	Rank	Result	Rank	Result	Rank
Isak Hughes	100 metres	10.40 SB	18	Did not advance			
Henrik Larsson	100 metres	Bye		10.14	4 Q	10.16	4
Erik Erlandsson	200 metres	20.55 PB	3 q	20.52 PB	9 q	20.57	4
Linus Phil	200 metres	20.95	13	Did not advance			
Andreas Kramer	800 metres	1:46.46	21 Q	1:45.33	3 Q	1:45.70	5
Samuel Pihlström	1500 metres	4:38.51	31 q	—N/a		DNS	
Emil Danielsson	1500 metres	3:51.67	30	—N/a		Did not advance	
Emil Danielsson	5000 metres	—N/a				13:27.42 SB	12
Mohammadreza Abootorabi	10,000 metres	—N/a				29:55.11 SB	38
Andreas Almgren	10,000 metres	—N/a				28:01.16	4
Oliver Löfqvist	10,000 metres	—N/a				28:28.42	20
Simon Sundström	10,000 metres	—N/a				28:33.93	26
Simon Sundström	3000 metres steeplechase	8:34.59	21	—N/a		Did not advance	
Emil Blomberg	3000 metres steeplechase	8:22.85	7 Q	—N/a		8:22.92	11
Vidar Johansson	3000 metres steeplechase	8:22.21	4 Q	—N/a		8:21.54	9
Suldan Hassan	Half marathon	—N/a				1:02:09 SB	13
Max Hrelja	110 metres hurdles	DNF		Did not advance			
Carl Bengtström	400 metres hurdles	Bye		48.51	6 Q	47.94 NR	3rd place, bronze medalist(s)
David Thid	400 metres hurdles	49.81 PB	9 q	49.52 PB	14	Did not advance	
Karl Wållgren	400 metres hurdles	DNF		Did not advance			
Perseus Karlström	20 kilometres walk	—N/a				1:19:13	1st place, gold medalist(s)
Kasper Kadestål; Marcus Tornée; Emil Johansson; David Thid	4 × 400 metres relay	3:07.71 SB	13	—N/a		Did not advance	

Field events

Athlete	Event	Qualification		Final	
Athlete	Event	Distance	Position	Distance	Position
Fabian Delryd	High jump	2.07	25	Did not advance	
Melwin Lycke Holm	High jump	2.17	18	Did not advance	
Armand Duplantis	Pole vault	5.60	1 q	6.10 CR	1st place, gold medalist(s)
Gabriel Wallmark	Triple jump	16.14 SB	18	Did not advance	
Jesper Arbinge	Shot put	18.97	22	Did not advance	
Wictor Petersson	Shot put	20.57	4 q	19.45	12
Simon Pettersson	Discus throw	61.43	16	Did not advance	
Daniel Ståhl	Discus throw	63.79	5 q	66.84	4
Ragnar Carlsson	Hammer throw	72.53	22	Did not advance	

=== Women ===
Track and road events

Athlete	Event	Heat		Semifinal		Final	
Athlete	Event	Result	Rank	Result	Rank	Result	Rank
Julia Henriksson	100 metres	11.31	9 q	11.27	14	Did not advance	
Julia Henriksson	200 metres	22.91	3 q	22.82 =NR	7 Q	22.91	6
Nora Lindahl	200 metres	22.97 PB	4 q	22.89 PB	9	Did not advance	
Lisa Lilja	400 metres	52.18 PB	10 q	52.55	20	Did not advance	
Wilma Nielsen	800 metres	2:01.82 PB	15 Q	2:00.86 PB	14	Did not advance	
Hanna Hermansson	1500 metres	4:13.34	20	—N/a		Did not advance	
Yolanda Ngarambe	1500 metres	4:06.96	5 Q	—N/a		4:07.59	10
Hanna Lindholm	Half marathon	—N/a				DNF	
Moa Granat	400 metres hurdles	55.95 EU23L	10 q	55.89 EU23L	21	Did not advance	
Emilia Lillemo	3000 metres steeplechase	9:33.01 PB	9 Q	—N/a		9:38.34	14
Julia Samuelsson	3000 metres steeplechase	10:01.65	28	—N/a		Did not advance	
Linn Söderholm	3000 metres steeplechase	9:34.62 PB	12 Q	—N/a		9:54.14	16
Lisa Lilja; Moa Granat; Jonna Claesson; Marie Kimumba	4 × 400 metres relay	3:29.84 NR	14	—N/a		Did not advance	

Field events

Athlete	Event	Qualification		Final	
Athlete	Event	Distance	Position	Distance	Position
Ellen Ekholm	High jump	1.81	26	Did not advance	
Maja Nilsson	High jump	1.89 q	11	1.86	12
Tilde Johansson	Long jump	6.55 SB	16	Did not advance	
Maja Åskag	Long jump	6.60 SB	14	Did not advance	
Maja Åskag	Triple jump	13.74	15	Did not advance	
Sara Lennman	Shot put	18.16	5 Q	18.16	8
Fanny Roos	Shot put	18.70	1 Q	18.26	6
Vanessa Kamga	Discus throw	60.88	10 q	60.62	9
Caisa-Marie Lindfors	Discus throw	61.22	8 q	60.28	10
Emma Ljungberg	Discus throw	51.98	27	Did not advance	
Grete Ahlberg	Hammer throw	65.47	25	Did not advance	
Rebecka Hallerth	Hammer throw	NM		Did not advance	
Thea Löfman	Hammer throw	64.31	26	Did not advance	

Combined events – Heptathlon

Athlete	Event	100H	HJ	SP	200 m	LJ	JT	800 m	Final	Rank
Lovisa Karlsson	Result	13.16	1.74 SB	12.28	23.99 PB	6.40	37.85	2:15.94 PB	6146 PB	10
Lovisa Karlsson	Points	1100	903	680	982	975	626	880	6146 PB	10
Bianca Salming	Result	14.48 SB	1.77	13.22	26.74	DNS	DNF			
Bianca Salming	Points	912	941	742	734	0	DNF			
