= Sweden at the 2022 European Athletics Championships =

- Flag of Sweden
- WA code: SWE
- National federation: Swedish Athletics Association

in Munich, Germany 15 August 2022 – 21 August 2022
- Competitors: 51 (27 men and 24 women) in 33 events
- Medals Ranked 14th: Gold 1 Silver 2 Bronze 0 Total 3

European Athletics Championships appearances
- 1934; 1938; 1946; 1950; 1954; 1958; 1962; 1966; 1969; 1971; 1974; 1978; 1982; 1986; 1990; 1994; 1998; 2002; 2006; 2010; 2012; 2014; 2016; 2018; 2022; 2024

Sweden competed at the 2022 European Athletics Championships in Munich, Germany, between 15 and 21 August 2022.

== Medallists ==
Medal	Name	Event	Date
Gold	Armand Duplantis	Men's pole vault	20 August
Silver	Thobias Montler	Men's long jump	16 August
Silver	Perseus Karlström	Men's 20 kilometres walk	20 August

== Results ==
Sweden entered the following athletes.

Key

- Q = Qualified for the next round
- q = Qualified for the next round as a fastest loser or, in field events, by position without achieving the qualifying target
- NR = National record
- PB = Personal best
- SB = Season best
- N/A = Round not applicable for the event

=== Men ===
Track and road events

Athlete	Event	Heat		Semifinal		Final	
Athlete	Event	Result	Rank	Result	Rank	Result	Rank
Henrik Larsson	100 m	10.31	2 Q	10.28	6	Did not advance	
Andreas Kramer	800 m	1:46.50	5 q	1:48.37	1 Q	1:45.38	4
Samuel Pihlström	1500 m	3:40.70	8	—N/a		Did not advance	
Andreas Almgren	5000 m	—N/a				13:26.48 PB	4
Jonas Glans	5000 m	—N/a				13:32.71	10
Archie Casteel	Marathon	—N/a				2:17:44	31
Ebba Tulu Chala	Marathon	—N/a				2:23:04	54
Jonas Leandersson	Marathon	—N/a				2:16:54	28
Mustafa Mohamed	Marathon	—N/a				2:19:52 SB	45
Linus Rosdal	Marathon	—N/a				2:17:09 SB	29
Samuel Tsegay Tesfamariam	Marathon	—N/a				DNF	–
Joel Bengtsson	110 m hurdles	13.84	2 Q	13.67	5	Did not advance	
Max Hrelja	110 m hurdles	13.80	7	Did not advance			
Carl Bengtström	400 m hurdles	Bye		49.52	4	Did not advance	
Emil Blomberg	3000 m steeplechase	8:35.22	8 q	—N/a		8:33.09	10
Vidar Johansson	3000 m steeplechase	8:38.42	9	—N/a		Did not advance	
Simon Sundström	3000 m steeplechase	8:50.30	12	—N/a		Did not advance	
Perseus Karlström	20 km walk	—N/a				1:19:23	2nd place, silver medalist(s)
Perseus Karlström	35 km walk	—N/a				DNF	–

Field events

Athlete	Event	Qualification		Final	
Athlete	Event	Distance	Position	Distance	Position
Armand Duplantis	Pole vault	5.65	=6 q	6.06 CR	1st place, gold medalist(s)
Thobias Montler	Long jump	8.06	1 Q	8.06	2nd place, silver medalist(s)
Jesper Hellström	Triple jump	16.07	12 q	16.23 SB	10
Simon Pettersson	Discus throw	62.39	10 q	67.12	4
Daniel Ståhl	Discus throw	66.39	3 Q	66.39	5
Ragnar Carlsson	Hammer throw	74.65	10 q	74.00	9
Jakob Samuelsson	Javelin throw	70.39	23	Did not advance	

Combined events – Decathlon

Athlete	Event	100 m	LJ	SP	HJ	400 m	110H	DT	PV	JT	1500 m	Final	Rank
Marcus Nilsson	Result	11.39 SB	7.00 SB	15.69 SB	1.99 SB	49.77 SB	14.88	46.06	5.20 PB	66.69 PB	4:18.51 SB	8327 PB	4
Marcus Nilsson	Points	776	814	832	794	825	864	789	972	839	822	8327 PB	4
Fredrik Samuelsson	Result	11.17	6.91	14.18 SB	1.96 =SB	50.70	14.83 SB	41.38	4.80	63.53 SB	4:44.94 SB	7757	13
Fredrik Samuelsson	Points	823	792	739	767	783	870	693	849	791	650	7757	13

=== Women ===
Track and road events

Athlete	Event	Heat		Semifinal		Final	
Athlete	Event	Result	Rank	Result	Rank	Result	Rank
Julia Henriksson	200 m	23.62	6	Did not advance			
Lisa Lilja	200 m	23.20	4 Q	23.96	8	Did not advance	
Lovisa Lindh	800 m	2:03.48	5	Did not advance			
Hanna Hermansson	1500 m	4:07.08	3 Q	—N/a		4:05.76 PB	7
Yolanda Ngarambe	1500 m	4:05.68 SB	9	—N/a		Did not advance	
Sarah Lahti	5000 m	—N/a				DNS	–
Sarah Lahti	10,000 m	—N/a				32:42.27 SB	14
Camilla Elofsson	Marathon	—N/a				2:45:34	44
Hanna Lindholm	Marathon	—N/a				2:38:44	30
Sanna Mustonen	Marathon	—N/a				2:43:23 SB	41
Emilia Lillemo	3000 m steeplechase	10:09.18	13	—N/a		Did not advance	
Linn Söderholm	3000 m steeplechase	9:57.53	10	—N/a		Did not advance	
Julia Henriksson; Daniella Busk; Filippa Sivnert; Elvira Tanderud	4 × 100 m relay	44.10	5	—N/a		Did not advance	

Field events

Athlete	Event	Qualification		Final	
Athlete	Event	Distance	Position	Distance	Position
Maja Nilsson	High jump	1.83	=15	Did not advance	
Lisa Gunnarsson	Pole vault	4.10	24	Did not advance	
Khaddi Sagnia	Long jump	6.59	7 q	6.61	6
Maja Åskag	Triple jump	13.23	20	Did not advance	
Axelina Johansson	Shot put	17.97	6 q	18.04	7
Sara Lennman	Shot put	16.95	18	Did not advance	
Fanny Roos	Shot put	17.79	8 q	18.55	4
Vanessa Kamga	Discus throw	51.66	25	Did not advance	
Grete Ahlberg	Hammer throw	68.73	5 q	67.29	9

Combined events – Heptathlon

Athlete	Event	100H	HJ	SP	200 m	LJ	JT	800 m	Final	Rank
Bianca Salming	Result	14.37	1.86 SB	14.26	26.04	5.83 SB	50.15 SB	2:11.85 SB	6185 PB	8
Bianca Salming	Points	927	1054	811	794	798	863	938	6185 PB	8
