= Mountain View High School (Utah) =

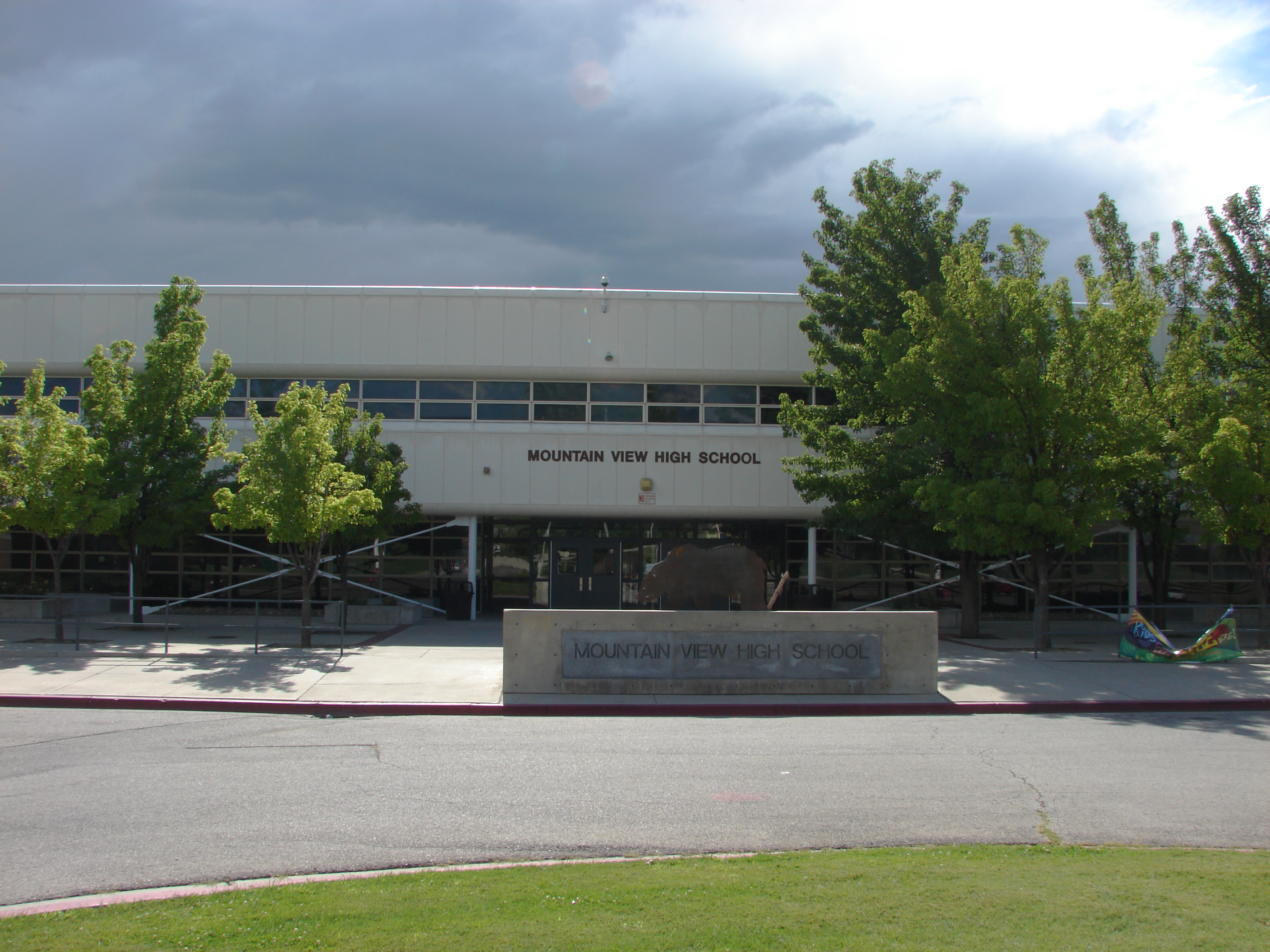
- Main entrance, July 2015

Location
- 665 W Center Street; Orem, UT 84057; 40°17′45″N 111°42′41″W

Information
- Type: Public
- Opened: 1980
- Principal: Kevin Henshaw
- Faculty: 63.72 (FTE)
- Grades: 10–12
- Enrollment: 1,541 (2023-2024)
- Student to teacher ratio: 24.18
- Colors: Cardinal, white and gold
- Mascot: Bruins
- Website: mvhs.alpineschools.org mountainviewbruins.org//

Mountain View High School (MVHS) is located in Orem, Utah, United States. It is part of Utah County's Alpine School District. The school first opened its doors to the graduating class of 1980–81. Feeder schools are all students at Orem Junior High School, and about half of students at Lakeridge Junior High School.

Like other schools in Utah, it has been accredited by the Utah State Office of Education.

== History ==
=== 2016 stabbing incident ===
On November 15, 2016, five students were stabbed in the boys locker room by a 16-year-old student, who also turned the knife on themself. Each of the students received at least one stab wound, but none were considered life-threatening by the Orem Police Department. The student was arrested and booked into a juvenile correctional facility.

== Athletics ==
The school sponsors fourteen sports and 24 varsity teams, including baseball, basketball, cheer, cross-country, football, golf, lacrosse, soccer, softball, swimming, tennis, track and field, volleyball, and wrestling. MVHS has won 99 UHSAA state athletic championships and seven national championships. As of November 2021, MVHS has more state championships than any other Utah high school in the sports of girls basketball, boys cross country, and girls cross country. For the Utah High School Activities Association (UHSAA) 2023-25 Alignment, MVHS competes at the 4A classification in Region 8 for football and all other activities.

The Utah Interscholastic Athletic Administrators Association (UIAAA) awarded MVHS the 5A classification Director's Cup for the 2020–21, 2021–22, and 2022–23 school years. The Director's Cup is awarded for athletic success (40%), academic achievement (40%), and student, school, and community sportsmanship (20%).

In 2021, there was an allegation by a volleyball player from another Utah high school about intimidation and harassment by a Mountain View High School coach. Also in 2021, a football game spurred an investigation from the United States Department of Education Office for Civil Rights when fans allegedly used racial slurs and threw drinks at opposing players.

== Notable faculty ==
- Eli Herring, mathematics teacher and football coach

== Notable alumni ==
- Leif Arrhenius, athlete
- Niklas Arrhenius, athlete
- Ben Cahoon, professional football
- Setema Gali, professional basketball
- Travis Hansen, professional basketball
- Mitch Jones, professional baseball
- Kevin McGiven, football player and coach
- Brendan Newby, athlete
- Noelle Pikus-Pace, athlete
- Shauna Rohbock, athlete
- Seth Scott, professional basketball
- Erin Thorn, professional basketball

== See also ==
- List of high schools in Utah
