= Norway at the 2022 European Championships =

in (Germany) Munich 11 August 2022 – 22 August 2022
- Competitors: 119 in 11 sports
- Medals Ranked 12th: Gold 5 Silver 1 Bronze 3 Total 9

European Championships appearances
- 2018; 2022

Norway competed at the 2022 European Championships in Munich from August 11 to August 22, 2022.

== Medallists ==
Medal	Name	Sport	Event	Date
Gold	Anita Stenberg	Cycling	Women's scratch	12 August
Gold	Birgit Skarstein	Rowing	Women's PR1 single sculls	13 August
Gold	Jakob Ingebrigtsen	Athletics	Men's 5000 metres	16 August
Gold	Jakob Ingebrigtsen	Athletics	Men's 1500 metres	18 August
Gold	Karsten Warholm	Athletics	Men's 400 metres hurdles	19 August
Silver	Zerei Kbrom Mezngi	Athletics	Men's 10,000 metres	21 August
Bronze	Eivind Henriksen	Athletics	Men's hammer throw	18 August
Bronze	Pål Haugen Lillefosse	Athletics	Men's pole vault	20 August
Bronze	Anders Mol; Christian Sørum	Beach volleyball	Men's tournament	21 August

== Competitors ==
The following is the list of number of competitors in the Championships:

Sport	Men	Women	Total
Athletics	27	18	45
Beach volleyball	4	0	4
Gymnastics (men and women)	5	5	10
Canoe sprint	4	5	9
Cycling mountain bike	4	1	5
Cycling road	5	4	9
Cycling track	0	1	1
Rowing	14	6	20
Sport climbing	2	3	5
Table tennis	2	3	5
Triathlon	3	3	6
Total	70	49	119

== Athletics ==
Norway entered the following athletes.

Key

- Q = Qualified for the next round
- q = Qualified for the next round as a fastest loser or, in field events, by position without achieving the qualifying target
- NR = National record
- PB = Personal best
- SB = Season best
- N/A = Round not applicable for the event

=== Men ===
Track and road events

Athlete	Event	Heat		Semifinal		Final	
Athlete	Event	Result	Rank	Result	Rank	Result	Rank
Mathias Hove Johansen	200 m	20.89	14	Did not advance			
Håvard Bentdal Ingvaldsen	400 m	46.18 SB	17	Did not advance			
Tobias Grønstad	800 m	1:48.28	27	Did not advance			
Ferdinand Kvan Edman	1500 m	3:41.30	20	—		Did not advance	
Jakob Ingebrigtsen	1500 m	3:38.48	7 Q	—		3:32.76 CR	1st place, gold medalist(s)
Jakob Ingebrigtsen	5000 m	—				13:21.13	1st place, gold medalist(s)
Narve Gilje Nordås	5000 m	—				13:39.12	17
Zerei Kbrom Mezngi	10,000 m	—				27:46.94 PB	2nd place, silver medalist(s)
Magnus Tuv Myhre	10,000 m	—				28:02.18 PB	7
Bjørnar Sandnes Lillefosse	10,000 m	—				28:59.67	20
Vladimir Vukićević	110 m hurdles	13.75	7 q	13.64	12	Did not advance	
Karsten Warholm	400 m hurdles	Bye		48.38	1 Q	47.12 CR	1st place, gold medalist(s)
Jacob Boutera	3000 m steeplechase	8:31.03	3 Q	—		8:33.38	11
Tom Erling Kårbø	3000 m steeplechase	8:32.22	6 Q	—		8:33.57	12
Fredrik Sandvik	3000 m steeplechase	9:05.47	30	—		Did not advance	
Weldu Negash Gebretsadik	Marathon	—				2:18:59	39

Field events

Athlete	Event	Qualification		Final	
Athlete	Event	Distance	Position	Distance	Position
Pål Haugen Lillefosse	Pole vault	5.65	6 q	5.75	3rd place, bronze medalist(s)
Sondre Guttormsen	Pole vault	5.65	9 q	5.75	6
Simen Guttormsen	Pole vault	5.50	13	Did not advance	
Henrik Flåtnes	Long jump	7.79	8 q	7.83	6
Ingar Kiplesund	Long jump	7.74	12 q	NM	
Marcus Thomsen	Shot put	20.32	8 q	19.91	9
Ola Stunes Isene	Dscus throw	60.55	16	Did not advance	
Sven Martin Skagestad	Dscus throw	NM		Did not advance	
Eivind Henriksen	Hammer throw	77.27	5 q	79.45	3rd place, bronze medalist(s)
Thomas Mardal	Hammer throw	68.56	24	Did not advance	

Combined events – Decathlon

Athlete	Event	100 m	LJ	SP	HJ	400 m	110H	DT	PV	JT	1500 m	Final	Rank
Martin Roe	Result	10.94 SB	7.21 SB	14.77 SB	1.87 SB	50.83 SB	16.19 SB	47.46 SB	4.60 SB	63.26 SB	4:41.72 SB	7754 SB	14
Martin Roe	Points	874	864	776	687	777	711	818	790	787	670	7754 SB	14
Sander Skotheim	Result	10.98	7.56	13.65	2.11	48.27 PB	15.64	44.13	5.00 SB	56.48	4:26.38 PB	8211	7
Sander Skotheim	Points	865	950	707	906	896	774	749	910	685	769	8211	7

=== Women ===
Track and road events

Athlete	Event	Heat		Semifinal		Final	
Athlete	Event	Result	Rank	Result	Rank	Result	Rank
Elisabeth Slettum	200 m	23.67	22	Did not advance			
Linn Oppegaard	400 m	53.29	20	Did not advance			
Hedda Hynne	800 m	2:03.64	19	Did not advance			
Amalie Sæten	1500 m	4:15.09	25	—		Did not advance	
Ingeborg Østgård	1500 m	4:19.36	26	—		Did not advance	
Karoline Bjerkeli Grøvdal	5000 m	—				DNF	
Maria Sagnes Wågan	Marathon	—				2:40:58 SB	36
Runa Skrove Falch	Marathon	—				2:41:08	37
Pernille Eugenie Epland	Marathon	—				DNF	
Maria Sagnes Wågan; Runa Skrove Falch; Pernille Eugenie Epland	Marathon Cup	—				NM	
Andrea Rooth	100 m hurdles	DQ		Did not advance			
Elisabeth Slettum	400 m hurdles	56.72	11 q	56.61	16	Did not advance	
Amalie Iuel	400 m hurdles	Bye		54.68 PB	5 q	55.32	5
Line Kloster	400 m hurdles	Bye		55.63	12	Did not advance	
Linn Oppegaard; Elisabeth Slettum; Line Kloster; Nora Kollerød Wold	4 × 400 m relay	3:31.36	12	—		Did not advance	

Field events

Athlete	Event	Qualification		Final	
Athlete	Event	Distance	Position	Distance	Position
Lene Retzius	Pole vault	4.50	2 q	4.25	12
Beatrice Nedberge Llano	Hammer throw	66.32	19	Did not advance	

== Beach Volleyball ==
Norway has qualified 2 male pairs.

Athlete	Event	Preliminary round			Round of 24	Round of 16	Quarterfinals	Semifinals	Final / BM	
Athlete	Event	Opposition Score	Opposition Score	Rank	Opposition Score	Opposition Score	Opposition Score	Opposition Score	Opposition Score	Rank
Mathias Berntsen; Hendrik Mol	Men's	Åhman – Hellvig (SWE)								
Christian Sørum; Anders Mol	Men's	Elazar – Ohana (ISR)								

== Cycling ==
=== Road ===
Men

Athlete	Event	Time	Rank
Jonas Abrahamsen	Road race	4:45:52	121
Alexander Kristoff	Road race	4:38:49	8
Anders Skaarseth	Road race	4:39:22	67
Rasmus Tiller	Road race	4:39:25	68
Syver Wærsted	Road race	4:45:52	122

== Gymnastics ==
Norway has entered five male and five female athletes.

=== Men ===
Qualification

Athlete	Event	Qualification								Final							
Athlete	Event	Apparatus						Total	Rank	Apparatus						Total	Rank
Athlete	Event	F	PH	R	V	PB	HB	Total	Rank	F	PH	R	V	PB	HB	Total	Rank
Joar Amblie	Team															—	
Sofus Heggemsnes	Team															—	
Jacob Karlsen	Team															—	
Peder Skogvang	Team															—	
Harald Wibye	Team															—	
Total	Team																

=== Women ===
Qualification

Athlete	Event	Qualification						Final					
Athlete	Event	Apparatus				Total	Rank	Apparatus				Total	Rank
Athlete	Event	V	UB	BB	F	Total	Rank	V	UB	BB	F	Total	Rank
Madelen Leitner	Team											—	
Julie Madsø	Team											—	
Mali Neurauter	Team											—	
Juliane Tøssebro	Team											—	
Maria Tronrud	Team											—	
Total	Team												

== Triathlon ==
Athlete	Event	Swim (1.5 km)	Trans 1	Bike (40 km)	Trans 2	Run (10 km)	Total Time	Rank
Casper Stornes	Men's							
Vetle Bergsvik Thorn	Men's							
Sebastian Wernersen	Men's							
Stine Dale	Women's							
Solveig Løvseth	Women's							
Lotte Miller	Women's							

=== Mixed ===
Athlete	Event	Swim (300 m)	Trans 1	Bike (6.8 km)	Trans 2	Run (2 km)	Total Group Time	Rank
	Mixed relay							
