= Daniel Persson =

Swedish politician (born 1982)

Member of the Riksdag
- Incumbent
- Assumed office 26 September 2022
- Constituency: Gävleborg County

Personal details
- Born: 1982 (age 43–44)
- Party: Sweden Democrats

Daniel Persson (born 1982) is a Swedish politician. He was elected as Member of the Riksdag in September 2022. He represents the constituency of Gävleborg County. He is affiliated with the Sweden Democrats.
