= Norway at the 2018 European Championships =

- IOC code: NOR

in (United Kingdom) Glasgow (Germany) Berlin 2 August 2018 – 12 August 2018
- Competitors: 87 in 7 sports
- Medals Ranked 13th: Gold 5 Silver 2 Bronze 1 Total 8

European Championships appearances
- 2018; 2022

Norway competed at the inaugural 7 sports 2018 European Championships from 2 to 12 August 2018. It competed in all sports.

== Medallists ==
Medal	Name	Sport	Event	Date
Gold	Kristoffer Brun; Are Strandli	Rowing	Men's lightweight double sculls	5 August
Gold	Kjetil Borch	Rowing	Men's single sculls	5 August
Gold	Karsten Warholm	Athletics	Men's 400 metres hurdles	9 August
Gold	Jakob Ingebrigtsen	Athletics	Men's 1500 metres	10 August
Gold	Jakob Ingebrigtsen	Athletics	Men's 5000 metres	11 August
Silver	Henrik Christiansen	Swimming	Men's 400 metre freestyle	3 August
Silver	Henrik Ingebrigtsen	Athletics	Men's 5000 metres	11 August
Bronze	Karoline Bjerkeli Grøvdal	Athletics	Women's 3000 metres steeplechase	12 August
