= Niklas Arrhenius =

American-Swedish discus thrower and shot putter

Nik Arrhenius
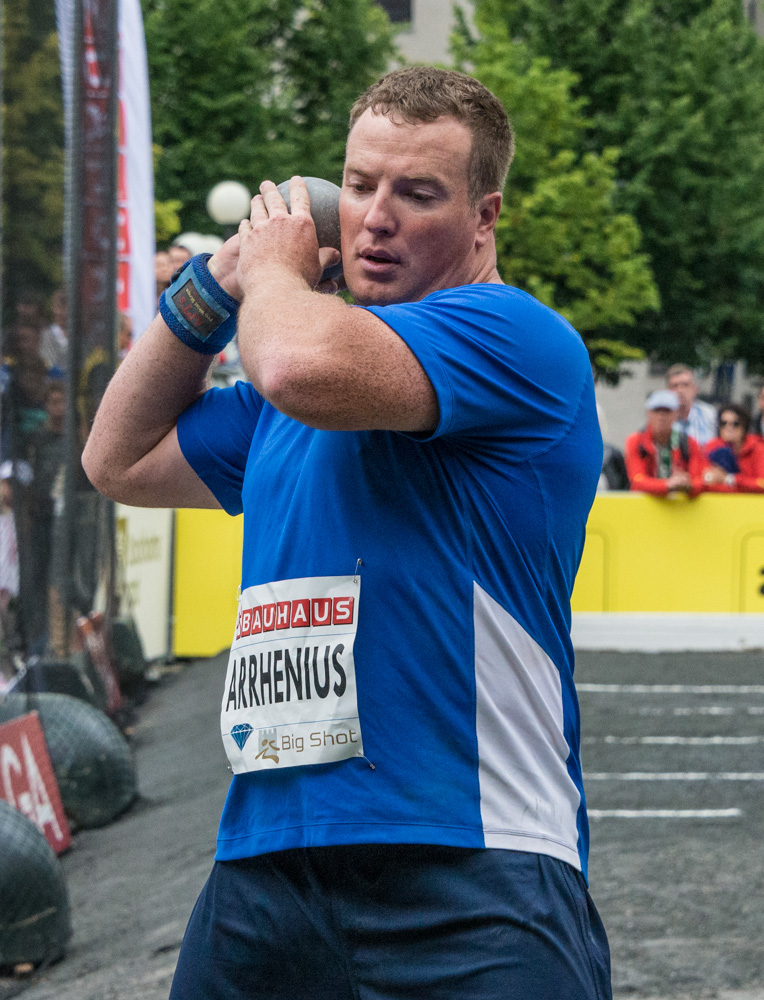
- Arrhenius in 2015

Personal information
- Nationality: Sweden and United States
- Born: Niklas Bo Arrhenius; September 10, 1982 (age 43) Provo, Utah, U.S.
- Education: Mountain View High School
- Height: 1.94 m (6 ft 4 in)
- Weight: 122 kg (269 lb)

Sport
- Country: Sweden (2000-2022) and United States (2022-now)
- Sport: Track and field / Athletics
- Rank: Highest (how long held rank); DT: 33rd (8 weeks); SP: 185th (1 week)
- Events: Discus throw and Shot put
- University team: Brigham Young University Cougars
- Club: Spårvägens FK
- Coached by: Anders Arrhenius, Jay Silvester and Mark Robison

Achievements and titles
- Personal bests: DT: 66.46 m (2020); SP: 19.75 m (2010); SP indoor: 19.91 m (2004)
Medal record
Representing Sweden
World Junior Championships
Silver medal – second place	2000 Santiago	Discus throw

Niklas Bo Arrhenius (born September 10, 1982) is an American-Swedish track and field athlete who competes and coaches in the discus throw and shot put. He represented Sweden in the discus at 2008 Summer Olympics, was a four-time competitor at the World Athletics Championships (2007, 2011, 2013, and 2017), and competed at five consecutive editions of the European Athletics Championships from 2006 to 2016. At the Swedish Athletics Championships he won seven national titles in discus, and was an eight-time champion in the shot put (combined indoors and outdoors).

== Early years / dual citizenship ==
In 1982, Arrhenius was born in Provo, Utah, U.S.A., but has dual citizenship. He is the son of Anders Arrhenius, who was born in Sweden and competed internationally in the shot put for Team Sweden.

Having competed for Sweden internationally for most of his career, Nik applied to transfer his eligibility to the United States on August 25, 2019. The decision was made on March 24, 2020, that starting August 26, 2022, he would be eligible to represent the United States instead of Sweden.

== High school years ==
In 2001, while competing for Mountain View High School Bruins in Orem, Utah, Nik was the national high school record holder for the discus for eight years (record holder until 2009), with a throw of 234 feet and 3 inches (breaking the previous record by nearly nine feet). Earlier that season, in 2001, he had broken the Utah state record with a throw of 218 feet, 2 inches.

Arrhenius also played for the Bruins' football team, until he suffered a knee injury, after which his father would not sign the parental permission forms for him nor his younger brother to play football.

== Junior Championships ==
In 2000, Arrhenius earned a silver medal at the World Junior Championships. In August 2001, he then won first place at the Swedish Junior (U20) Championships, and he finished second place in the discus event at the Swedish Open Championships.

== University years ==
In 2007, while attending BYU, Arrhenius earned the national championship in the discus throw. On his fifth throw of the day, he launched the disc 206 feet, 2 inches to pass Stanford University Cardinal's Michael Robertson. Six years after becoming the national high school championship (in 2001), he went on to win the NCAA national championship in 2007.

== European Athletics Championships ==
In 2008, Arrhenius was the top-ranked discus thrower in European meets; while on Team Sweden. He got 4th place in the 2001 European Junior Championships, has competed in at least five European Championships and two European Indoor Championships, for results see the Competition record below.

== Olympics ==
In 2008, Arrhenius came in 32nd place (out of 37 contestants) at the Olympics in Beijing, China, in the Men's discus throw with his best throw in the Olympics at 58.22 meters. If he had thrown his personal best record in the Olympics, he would have gone to the finals, but he would have placed no better than sixth.

History almost repeated itself, like father, like son, or déjà vu, as both had qualified for the Olympics for Team Sweden and both suffered injuries just before the Games started. Nik's blister injury was not severe enough to keep him from participating like his father's injury; However, Nik's blister did hinder him in that his best throw in the 2008 Beijing Olympics was about five meters below his season best and seven meters below his personal best. Most of all, his three throws were all short of the distance needed to move Nik into the finals, his best throw of the day was 4.26 meters short of qualifying for the finals.

== World Athletic Championships ==
On June 28, 2013, Arrhenius qualified for the World Championships this was his fourth appearance at the World Championships having also participated in 2007, 2009 and 2011 and 2013. Since then, he has participated in one more, a fifth, World Championship, in 2017. To see his results, go to the Competition record section below.

== Coaching career ==
Nik Arrhenius has again followed in his father's footsteps by becoming a throws coach (more generically, assistant track coach) for the BYU Cougars men's and women's track and field teams (his father, Anders Arrhenius, has been a volunteer throws coach at BYU). Nik has coached Ashton Riner to the 2022 NCAA track & field championships in Eugene, Oregon.

== Family of athletes and missionaries ==
=== Great-grandfather ===
The great-grandfather of Nik Arrhenius, Bror Aron Axel Arrhenius, started this Legacy, when he took the family name Arrhenius on December 5, 1901. He was conducting the Olympic choir at the 1912 Summer Olympics in Stockholm and he participated on the Swedish tug of war team that won gold medal. It was an exhibition sport for all of the musicians that participated from different countries.

In another account, Borr Arrhenius, was the anchor of Team Sweden’s tug-of-war team at the 1912 Olympic Games in Stockholm.

Here is an external link to a 43-second video of the 1912 Tug of War competition:

- Olympic Tug Of War - Great Britain Defeat Sweden | Stockholm 1912 Olympics (43-second video) on YouTube

=== Father, Anders Hilding Arrhenius ===
Anders Arrhenius, was born in Sweden in 1947. Then, in 1975, he threw for BYU and received All-American honors. Anders also went on to qualify for Sweden in the 1976 Summer Olympics, but injury prevented him from participating in those Olympics. Because Anders did qualify for the Olympics, he is considered "An Olympian".

=== Mother, Kristine (née Fowler) Arrhenius ===
In the early 1970s, Kristine Fowler, who is from Rose Park, Salt Lake City, went to Stockholm, Sweden, on a church mission, where she first met Anders Arrhenius.

=== Older brother, Dr. Daniel Anders Arrhenius, PDM ===
Like Nik, Dan Arrhenuis was born in Provo, but in 1978, and went to Mountain View High School, where he earned all kinds of awards, honors and championships in the discus and shot put, just like Nik. Dan also did very well at BYU adding the hammer throw to the list of events, just like Nik. Dan also went on a church mission to Stockholm, Sweden, just like his mother and younger brothers, Nik and Leif. Dan met and married Amanda at BYU. What the main difference is between these two brothers (Dan and Nik) is that when Dan graduated with his degree in Exercise Science, he continued with schooling to eventually be a Doctor of Podiatric Medicine (DPM), instead of continuing to compete internationally and in the Olympics.

=== Younger brother, Leif Hilding Arrhenius ===
Like Nik, Leif Arrhenius was born in Provo, Utah, but in 1986, and went to Mountain View High School, where he earned all kinds of awards, honors and championships in the discus and shot put, just like Nik and Dan. Leif also did very well at BYU adding the hammer throw to the list of events, just like Nik and Dan. Leif also went on a church mission just like his mother and older brothers, Kristine, Dan and Nik; however, Leif went to the Taipei Taiwan Mission, unlike the rest of his family that went to the Stockholm Sweden Mission. Leif graduated from BYU in 2010. Leif has even gone into coaching, like his father, Anders and brother, Nik.

=== Wife, Tiffany (née Rasmussen) Arrhenius ===
In 2004, Nik married Tiffany Rasmussen, from Oregon, who was also an athlete at BYU. She threw the Javelin and graduated in 2007.

== Personal life ==
Arrhenius is a member of the Church of Jesus Christ of Latter-day Saints. He served as a church missionary in the Sweden Stockholm Mission. Nik achieved the rank of Eagle Scout when he was in the Boy Scouts of America as a teenager.

== Competition record ==
Year	Competition	Venue	Position	Event	Notes
Representing Sweden (2000-2022), United States (2022-now)
2000	World Junior Championships	Santiago, Chile	2nd	Discus throw	59.19 m
2001	European Junior Championships	Grosseto, Italy	4th	Discus throw	53.14 m
2006	European Championships	Gothenburg, Sweden	21st (q)	Discus throw	56.62 m
2007	World Championships	Osaka, Japan	26th (q)	Discus throw	58.76 m
2008	Olympic Games	Beijing, China	32nd (q)	Discus throw	58.22 m
2010	European Championships	Barcelona, Spain	16th (q)	Shot put	18.93 m
2010	European Championships	Barcelona, Spain	21st (q)	Discus throw	60.25 m
2011	European Indoor Championships	Paris, France	14th (q)	Shot put	19.21 m
2011	World Championships	Daegu, South Korea	28th (q)	Discus throw	60.57 m
2012	European Championships	Helsinki, Finland	22nd (q)	Discus throw	59.02 m
2013	European Indoor Championships	Gothenburg, Sweden	8th	Shot put	19.17 m
2013	World Championships	Moscow, Russia	24th (q)	Discus throw	59.13 m
2014	European Championships	Zürich, Switzerland	–	Discus throw	NM
2016	European Championships	Amsterdam, Netherlands	19th (q)	Discus throw	61.63 m
2017	World Championships	London, United Kingdom	24th (q)	Discus throw	58.91 m

== National titles ==
- Swedish Athletics Championships
  - Shot put: 2009, 2010, 2011
  - Discus throw: 2004, 2006, 2007, 2010, 2011, 2012, 2013
- Swedish Indoor Athletics Championships
  - Shot put: 2010, 2011, 2012, 2014, 2018
- NCAA Division I Outdoor Track and Field Championships
- Discus throw: 2007

== Personal bests ==
- Discus throw: 66.46 m (2020)
- Shot put: 19.75 m (2010)
- Shot put indoor: 19.91 m (2004)

Year	Competition	Venue	Position	Event	Notes
Nik Arrhenius' All-time Personal Top 10 in the discus throw
Representing Sweden (2000-2022), United States (2022-now)
September 26, 2020	USATF Summer Throwing	Smith Fieldhouse, BYU, Provo, Utah, U.S.A.	1st	Discus	66.46 m
August 8, 2011	Helsingborg	Helsingborg, Sweden	1st	Discus	66.22 m
July 19, 2016	Provo, Utah, U.S.A.	Provo, Utah, U.S.A.	1st	Discus	66.02 m
May 12, 2011	Chula Vista OTC Thursday Invitational	Chula Vista, California, U.S.A.	2nd	Discus	65.80 m
May 17, 2007	Salinas Discus Series	Salinas, California, U.S.A.	2nd	Discus	65.77 m
July 18, 2017	Provo, Utah, U.S.A.	Provo, Utah, U.S.A.	1st	Discus	65.72 m
May 5, 2009	Chula Vista World Record Challenge	Chula Vista, California, U.S.A.	3rd	Discus	65.42 m
May 16, 2017	Orem USATF Developmental Meet	Orem, Utah, U.S.A.	1st	Discus	65.01 m
April 28, 2009	Chula Vista World Record Challenge	Chula Vista, California, U.S.A.	5th	Discus	65.00 m
May 20, 2016	Spanish Fork Spring Throwing	Spanish Fork, Utah, U.S.A.	1st	Discus	64.83 m

== See also ==
- List of discus throw national champions (men)
- Sweden at the 2011 World Championships in Athletics
- Sweden at the 2012 European Athletics Championships
- Sweden at the 2013 World Championships in Athletics
- Sweden at the 2014 European Athletics Championships
- Sweden at the 2016 European Athletics Championships
- Sweden at the 2017 World Championships in Athletics
