= Leif Arrhenius =

Swedish-American shot putter

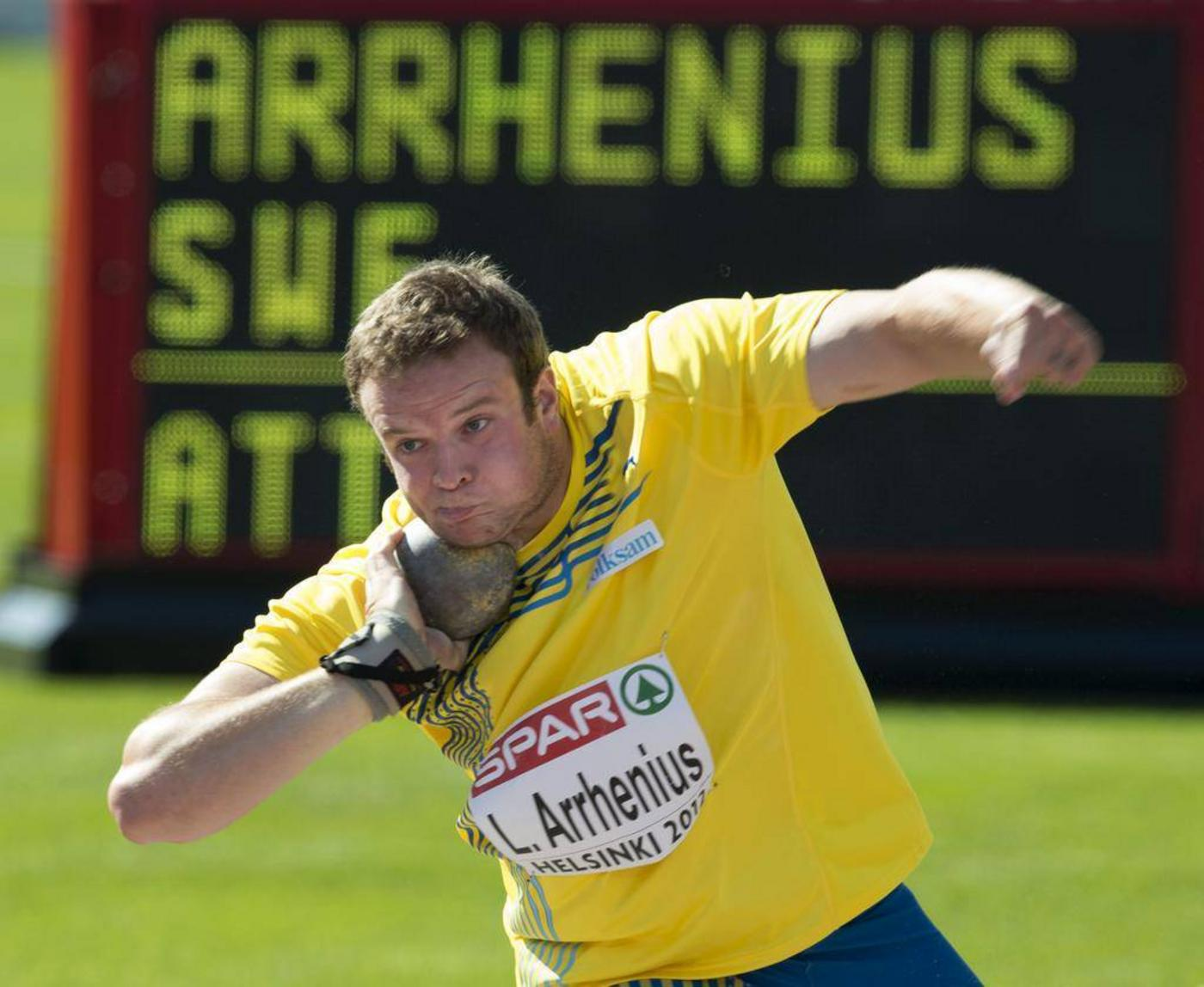
- Leif Arrhenius

Personal information
- Nationality: Sweden and United States
- Born: Leif Hilding Arrhenius; 15 July 1986 (age 39) Provo, Utah, U.S.
- Education: Mountain View High School Brigham Young University
- Height: 1.94 m (6 ft 4 in)
- Weight: 115.5 kg (255 lb)

Sport
- Country: Sweden
- Sport: Track and field / Athletics
- Event(s): Discus throw and Shot put
- University team: Brigham Young University Cougars
- Club: Spårvägens FK
- Coached by: Anders Arrhenius, L. Jay Silvester; Nik Arrhenius; Vesteinn Hafsteinsson

Achievements and titles
- Personal best(s): In International Competitions: Outdoor: SP: 20.50 m (2013); DT: 64.46 m (2011); DT-1.75kg: 60.14 m (2005); HT: 62.77 m (2010); JT: 49.27 m (2020); Indoor: SP: 20.29 m (2013); SP-35lbs: 21.56 m (2010); Collegiate personal bests: DT: 207 feet 0 inches SP: 65 feet 4.25 inches HT: 205 feet 11 inches JT: 163 feet 7 inches WT: 70 feet 9 inches
Medal record
Representing Sweden
European Throwing Cup
Silver medal – second place	2015 Leiria	Shot put

Leif Hilding Arrhenius (born 15 July 1986) is a professional American-Swedish athlete competing in the shot put and discus throw. He represented Team Sweden at two World and three European Championships. In addition, he is the 2011 U.S. Collegiate Indoor Champion.

== Early years and dual citizenship ==
Born in Utah, Arrhenius has dual Swedish and American citizenship. Leif comes from a family of athletes and missionaries (see the "Family of athletes and missionaries" section below), where his great-grandfather, father and brother have all been Olympians.

== High school years ==
In 2003, Arrhenius was ranked 1st nationally in discus, 2nd in the shot put. In 2004, he was ranked 3rd in both discus and the hammer throw. By the end of the 2003 season, at the Utah State Track & Field Meet, he threw the discus 37 feet further than second place Kevin Smith of Box Elder High School.

In 2004, Arrhenius, while attending Mountain View High School and competing for the Bruins, at the Simplot Games track and field competition in Pocatello, Idaho, he broke his own national high school record by 0.75 inches with a toss of his 25-pound weight throw of 82 feet 7.25 inches. He also set a new Utah state high school record, while he finished second in the shot put with a toss of 64 feet 3 inches.

== University years ==
Arrhenius represented Brigham Young University and competed for the Cougars from 2005 and 2008–2011. He was a seven-time All-American. He was 2011 NCAA indoor champion in the shot put.

In 2010, Arrhenius earned All-American honors at the NCAA Indoor Championships, when he obliterated his personal best in the weight throw, achieving a fourth place finish.

In 2011, Arrhenius, at the NCAA Outdoor Track & Field Championships in Des Moines, Iowa, threw the discus, 201 feet 3 inches (or 61.36 meters), that got him second place, and earned him a first-team All-American. He also threw the shot put, 63 feet 6.75 inches (or 19.37 meters), where he also got second place and first-team All-America accolades. This helped to put BYU in first place at this event. A week later and he was selected as the Mountain West Men's Outdoor Track & Field Student-Athlete of the Year. About the event, BYU head track & field coach said, "He did incredible for us, it was an amazing throw and he really competed down to the end. To score 16 points at Nationals is pretty tough to do."

Arrhenius was also recruited by the University of Kentucky Wildcats and University of Washington Huskies. BYU head Track & field coach Mark Robison said that Leif was one of the best to ever come out of high school.

== Coaching career ==
In 2013, Leif Arrhenius has again followed in his father's and older brother's footsteps by becoming a coach at Park City High School. Leif's older brother, Nik, was a throws coach/assistant coach at BYU. Leif's father, Anders Arrhenius, has been a volunteer throws coach at BYU. Leif now works for Centennial Middle School in Provo, Utah, as the Boys' P.E. Coach.

== Family of athletes and missionaries ==
=== Great-grandfather ===
The great-grandfather of Leif Arrhenius, Bror Aron Axel Arrhenius, started this Legacy, when he took the family name Arrhenius on 5 December 1901. He was conducting the Olympic choir at the 1912 Summer Olympics in Stockholm and he participated on the Swedish tug of war team that won gold medal. It was an exhibition sport for all of the musicians that participated from different countries.

In another account, Bror Arrhenius, was the anchor of Team Sweden's tug-of-war team at the 1912 Olympic Games in Stockholm.

Here is an external link to a 43-second video of the 1912 Tug of War competition:

- Olympic Tug Of War – Great Britain Defeat Sweden | Stockholm 1912 Olympics (43-second video) on YouTube

=== Father, Anders Hilding Arrhenius ===
Anders Arrhenius, was born in Sweden in 1947. Then, in 1975, he threw for BYU and received All-American honors. Anders also went on to qualify for Sweden in the 1972 Summer Olympics.

=== Mother, Kristine (née Fowler) Arrhenius ===
In the early 1970s, Kristine Fowler, who is from Rose Park, Salt Lake City, went to Stockholm, Sweden, on a church mission, where she first met Anders Arrhenius.

=== Older brother, Dr. Daniel Anders Arrhenius, PDM ===
Like Leif, Dan Arrhenius was born in Provo, Utah in 1978. He went to Mountain View High School, where he earned all kinds of awards, honors and championships in the discus and shot put, just like Leif. Dan also did very well at BYU adding the hammer throw to the list of events. Dan went on a church mission to Stockholm, Sweden, just like his mother and younger brother, Nik. Dan graduated with his degree in Exercise Science, and continued with his schooling to eventually become a Doctor of Podiatric Medicine (DPM).

=== Older brother, Niklas Bo Arrhenius ===
Like Leif, Nik Arrhenius was born in Provo, Utah, and went to Mountain View High School, where he earned all kinds of awards, honors and championships in the discus and shot put. Nik graduated from BYU in 2006. Niklas is the current throws coach at Brigham Young University.

=== Sister-in-law, Tiffany (née Rasmussen) Arrhenius ===
In 2004, Leif's brother, Nik, married Tiffany Rasmussen, from Oregon, who was also an athlete at BYU. She threw the Javelin and graduated in 2007.

== Personal life ==
Arrhenius is a member of the Church of Jesus Christ of Latter-day Saints. He served as a church missionary in the Taichung Taiwan Mission.

== Competition record ==
Year	Competition	Venue	Position	Event	Notes
Representing Sweden
2011	World Championships	Daegu, South Korea	22nd (q)	Discus throw	61.33m
2012	European Championships	Helsinki, Finland	13th (q)	Shot put	19.33m
2012	European Championships	Helsinki, Finland	17th (q)	Discus throw	60.49m
2013	European Indoor Championships	Gothenburg, Sweden	10th (q)	Shot put	19.61m
2013	World Championships	Moscow, Russia	14th (q)	Shot put	19.53m
2014	European Championships	Zürich, Switzerland	17th (q)	Shot put	19.54m
2015	European Indoor Championships	Prague, Czech Republic	19th (q)	Shot put	19.07m
2016	European Championships	Amsterdam, Netherlands	23rd (q)	Shot put	18.64m

== Personal bests ==
Outdoor

- Shot put – 20.50 (Hässleholm 2013)
- Discus throw – 64.46 (Växjö 2011)
- Hammer throw – 63.62 (Provo, Utah 2014)

Indoor

- Shot put – 20.29 (Copenhagen 2013)
- Weight Throw-21.56 (Fayetteville, Arkansas 2010)
