= Adil Bouafif =

Swedish long-distance runner

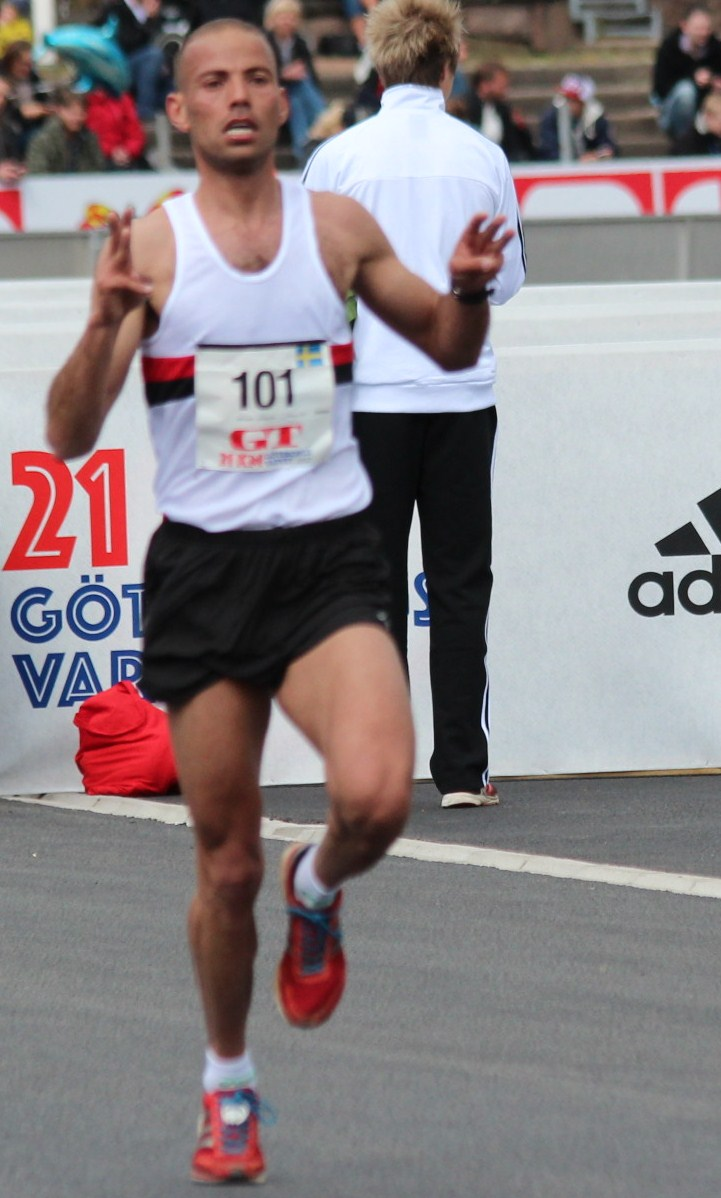
- Adil Bouafif in 2012

Personal information
- Born: 31 December 1978 (age 47) Morocco

Sport
- Sport: Runner
- Event: Hässelby sportklubb

Adil Bouafif (born 31 December 1978) is a Swedish long distance runner who also competes in marathon. He has competed for Sweden since 2010.

== Career ==
He came to Sweden from Morocco in 2007 and became a full Swedish citizen in 2010; he has competed for Sweden ever since. Bouafif ran the marathon at the 2010 European Athletics Championships in Barcelona, Spain. He did not complete the race.

In 2011, he competed in the 3000 meters at the 2011 European Athletics Indoor Championships in Paris, France, but was eliminated.

Bouafif competed in the 2012 European Athletics Championships in Helsinki, Finland. He placed thirteenth in 5000 meters and fourteenth in the 10,000 meters. In April 2012, Adil Bouafif won two gold medals in short and long distance terrain running at the Swedish terrain running championships.

At the 2013 European Athletics Indoor Championships in Gothenburg, Sweden, Bouafif competed in the 3000 meters, and placed seventh in the final. In 2014, he became number 530 to be awarded the Stora Grabbars och Tjejers Märke, an honorary award for his achievements in sports. In August 2014, Adil Bouafif won his fourth gold medal in 10,000 meters at the Swedish national championships.

He has also competed in Finnkampen. On 13 August 2014, Bouafif competed in the 10,000 meters at the European Athletics Championships in Zürich, but did not complete the race as he felt pain in his hamstrings. On 26 September 2014, he tested positive for a banned substance. In December 2015, he was sentenced to two years suspension from the sports retroactively from 23 September 2014 until 22 September 2016. And then another two years from that date he was banned from running for the national team. Bouafif came back to the sport in 2017 at the Midnattsloppet. He claimed to be innocent.
