= Sweden at the 2018 European Championships =

- WA code: SWE

in Berlin and Glasgow
- Competitors: 123 in 7 sports
- Medals Ranked 12th: Gold 6 Silver 3 Bronze 1 Total 10

European Championships appearances
- 2018; 2022

Sweden competed at the 2018 European Championships in Berlin, Germany; and Glasgow, United Kingdom from 2 to 12 August 2018 in 7 sports.

== Medallists ==
Medal	Name	Sport	Event	Date
Gold	Sarah Sjöström	Swimming	Women's 100 m butterfly	4 August
Gold	Sarah Sjöström	Swimming	Women's 50 m freestyle	4 August
Gold	Sarah Sjöström	Swimming	Women's 100m freestyle	8 August
Gold	Sarah Sjöström	Swimming	Women's 50 m butterfly	9 August
Gold	Cajsa Persson; Linda Wessberg	Golf	Women's team	12 August
Gold	Armand Duplantis	Athletics	Men’s pole vault	12 August
Silver	Jonna Adlerteg	Gymnastics	Women's uneven bars	5 August
Silver	Daniel Ståhl	Athletics	Men’s discus throw	8 August
Silver	Andreas Kramer	Athletics	Men’s 800 metres	11 August
~~Bronze~~	~~Meraf Bahta~~	~~Athletics~~	~~Women’s 10,000 metres~~	~~8 August~~
Bronze	Julia Engström; Oscar Florén; Johanna Gustafsson; Daniel Jennevret	Golf	Mixed team	11 August

Medals by sport
Sport	1st place, gold medalist(s)	2nd place, silver medalist(s)	3rd place, bronze medalist(s)	Total
Aquatics	4	0	0	4
Athletics	1	2	0	3
Golf	1	0	1	2
Gymnastics	0	1	0	1
Total	6	3	1	10

Medals by date
Day	Date	1st place, gold medalist(s)	2nd place, silver medalist(s)	3rd place, bronze medalist(s)	Total
3	4 August	2	0	0	2
4	5 August	0	1	0	1
7	8 August	1	1	0	3
8	9 August	1	0	0	1
10	11 August	0	1	1	2
11	12 August	2	0	0	2
Total		6	3	1	10

Medals by gender
Gender	1st place, gold medalist(s)	2nd place, silver medalist(s)	3rd place, bronze medalist(s)	Total
Male	1	2	0	3
Female	5	1	0	7
Mixed events	0	0	1	1
Total	6	3	1	10

== Athletics ==
A total of 67 athletes were selected to the team.

Men
Track & road events

Athlete	Event	Heat		Semifinal		Final	
Athlete	Event	Result	Rank	Result	Rank	Result	Rank
Erik Hagberg	100 m	10.69	37	did not advance			
Henrik Larsson	100 m	10.62	35	did not advance			
Dennis Leal	100 m	10.51	23	did not advance			
Felix Svensson	200 m	20.95	18	did not advance			
Erik Martinsson	400 m	46.87	23	Did not advance			
Andreas Kramer	800 m	1:47.87	14 Q	1:46.14	2 Q	1:45.03	2nd place, silver medalist(s)
Kalle Berglund	1500 m	3:41.25	11	—N/a		did not advance	
Elmar Engholm	1500 m	3:42.01	13	—N/a		did not advance	
Johan Rogestedt	1500 m	3:49.73	23	—N/a		Did not advance	
Isak Andersson	400 m hurdles	51.18	19	did not advance			
Emil Blomberg	3000 m steeplechase	Did not finish		—N/a		Did not advance	
Napoleon Solomon	3000 m steeplechase	8:29:10	7 q	—N/a		8:43.66	12
Mikael Ekvall	Marathon	—N/a				did not finish	
Perseus Karlström	20 km walk	—N/a				1:25.16	20
Anders Hansson	50 km walk	—N/a				4:11:36	23
Ato Ibáñez	50 km walk	—N/a				4:03.53	20
Tony Darkwah; Erik Hagberg; Felix Svensson; Stefan Tärnhuvud	4x100 m relay	did not finish		—N/a		did not advance	
Carl Bengtström; Dennis Forsman; Joel Groth; Erik Martinsson	4x400 m relay	Disqualified		—N/a		did not advance	

Field events

Athlete	Event	Qualification		Final	
Athlete	Event	Distance	Position	Distance	Position
Armand Duplantis	Pole vault	5.61	7 q	6.05	1st place, gold medalist(s)
Melker Svärd Jacobsson	Pole vault	did not finish		did not advance	
Thobias Nilsson Montler	Long jump	7.78	9 q	8.10	4
Michel Tornéus	Long jump	7.91	3 q	7.86	7
Axel Härstedt	Discus throw	61.19	17	did not advance	
Simon Pettersson	Discus throw	64.82	2 Q	64.55	4
Daniel Ståhl	Discus throw	67.07	1 Q	68.23	2nd place, silver medalist(s)
Anders Eriksson	Hammer throw	69.19	27	did not advance	
Jiannis Smalios	Javelin throw	72.09	25	did not advance	

Combined events – Decathlon

Athlete	Event	100 m	LJ	SP	HJ	400 m	110H	DT	PV	JT	1500 m	Points	Rank
Marcus Nilsson	Result	11.37	7.13	13.90	1.99	51.07	14.73	44.73	4.60	59.67	4:29.86	7819	12
Marcus Nilsson	Points	780	845	722	794	766	882	761	790	733	746	7819	12
Fredrik Samuelsson	Result	11.04	7.52	13.99	2.08	49.60	14.70	43.94	4.50	56.91	4:38.10	8005	9
Fredrik Samuelsson	Points	852	940	728	878	833	886	745	760	691	692	8005	9

Women
Track & road events

Athlete	Event	Heat		Semifinal		Final	
Athlete	Event	Result	Rank	Result	Rank	Result	Rank
Matilda Hellqvist	400 m	52.68	17	did not advance			
Hanna Hermansson	800 m	2:01.33	5 Q	2:00.52	6	did not advance	
Lovisa Lindh	800 m	2:04.28	26 Q	2:03.25	13 qR	2:02.26	9
Hanna Hermansson	1500 m	4:08.98	4 Q	—N/a		4:07.16	7
Anna Silvander	1500 m	4:12.61	20	—N/a		did not advance	
Meraf Bahta	5000 m	—N/a				did not start	
Charlotta Fougberg	5000 m	—N/a				15:24.36	9
Linn Nilsson	5000 m	—N/a				did not finish	
Meraf Bahta	10,000 m	—N/a				~~32:19.34~~	DQ
Charlotta Fougberg	10,000 m	—N/a				32:43.04	6
Elin Westerlund	100 m hurdles	13.42	17	did not advance			
Johanna Holmén Svensson	400 m hurdles	57.55	14	Did Not Advance			
Caroline Högardh	3000 m steeplechase	9:55.61	30	—N/a		Did not advance	
Mikaela Larsson	Marathon	—N/a				2:35.06	17
Hanna Lindholm	Marathon	—N/a				2:37.44	22
Cecilia Norrbom	Marathon	—N/a				did not finish	
Malin Starfelt	Marathon	—N/a				2:42.32	32
Hanna Adriansson-Norberg; Irene Ekelund; Claudia Payton; Elin Östlund	4x100 m relay	44.51	15	—N/a		did not advance	
Lisa Duffy; Mathilda Hellqvist; Moa Hjelmer; Josefine Magnusson	4x400 m relay	3:32.61	9	—N/a		did not advance	

Field events

Athlete	Event	Qualification		Final	
Athlete	Event	Distance	Position	Distance	Position
Erika Kinsey	High jump	1.90	9 q	1.87	13
Sofie Skoog	High jump	1.86	16	did not advance	
Angelica Bengtsson	Pole vault	4.45	5 q	4.65	6
Lisa Gunnarsson	Pole vault	4.35	8	did not advance	
Khaddi Sagnia	Long jump	6.69	5 Q	6.47	7
Fanny Roos	Shot put	17.71	6 Q	17.09	11
Frida Åkerström	Shot put	16.20	19	Did Not Advance	
Vanessa Kamga	Discus throw	54.88	18	did not advance	
Ida Storm	Hammer throw	66.66	17	did not advance	
Sofi Flink	Javelin throw	59.58	9 q	56.91	10

Combined events – Heptathlon

Athlete	Event	100H	HJ	SP	200 m	LJ	JT	800 m	Final	Rank
Lisa Linell	Result	14.66	1.79	12.34	26.14	DNF	DNF	DNF		
Lisa Linell	Points	887	996	684	785	DNF	DNF	DNF		
Bianca Salming	Result	14.69	1.82	13.41	26.58	DNF	DNF	DNF		
Bianca Salming	Points	883	1003	755	747	DNF	DNF	DNF		

== Aquatics ==
=== Diving ===
Men

Athlete	Event	Qualification		Final	
Athlete	Event	Points	Rank	Points	Rank
Vinko Paradzik	1 m springboard	336.90	8 Q	293.25	12
Vinko Paradzik	10 m platform	369.80	11 Q	359.55	12

Women

Athlete	Event	Qualification		Final	
Athlete	Event	Points	Rank	Points	Rank
Ellen Ek	10 m platform	260.40	7 Q	267.70	9
Daniella Nero	1 m springboard	216.80	13	did not advance	
Daniella Nero	3 m springboard	234.50	13	did not advance	
Isabelle Svantesson	10 m platform	241.60	10 Q	199.85	11
Ellen Ek; Isabelle Svantesson	10 m synchro platform	—N/a		214.65	7

Mixed

Athlete	Event	Final	
Athlete	Event	Points	Rank
Daniella Nero; Vinko Paradzik	3 m springboard synchro	233.34	9
Ellen Ek; Vinko Paradzik	Team event	270.30	7

=== Swimming ===
Men

Athlete	Event	Heat		Semifinal		Final	
Athlete	Event	Time	Rank	Time	Rank	Time	Rank
Christoffer Carlsen	50 m freestyle	22.82	30	did not advance			
Christoffer Carlsen	100 m freestyle	49.63	23	did not advance			
Gustaf Dahlman	100 m freestyle	50.91	61	did not advance			
Gustaf Dahlman	200 m freestyle	1:50.53	43	did not advance			
Isak Eliasson	50 m freestyle	22.89	32	did not advance			
Isak Eliasson	100 m freestyle	50.27	43	did not advance			
Robin Hanson	200 m freestyle	1:49.41	=19	did not advance			
Robin Hanson	400 m freestyle	3:51.33	16	—N/a		did not advance	
Gustav Hökfelt	50 m backstroke	26.01	35	did not advance			
Gustav Hökfelt	100 m backstroke	55.26	25	did not advance			
Gustav Hökfelt	200 m backstroke	did not start		did not advance			
Victor Johansson	400 m freestyle	3:48.05	5 Q	—N/a		3:47.74	5
Victor Johansson	800 m freestyle	7:54.31	=9	—N/a		did not advance	
Victor Johansson	1500 m freestyle	15:15.75	15	—N/a		did not advance	
Adam Paulsson	200 m freestyle	1:50.74	44	did not advance			
Adam Paulsson	400 m freestyle	3:51.98	20	—N/a		did not advance	
Adam Paulsson	400 m individual medley	4:21.34	18	—N/a		did not advance	
Erik Persson	100 m breaststroke	1:00.94	18 Q	1:00.54	14	did not advance	
Erik Persson	200 m breaststroke	2:12.43	15 Q	1:09.84	6	2:10.25	8
Björn Seeliger	50 m freestyle	22.78	=27	did not advance			
Björn Seeliger	100 m freestyle	50.55	51	did not advance			
Björn Seeliger	50 m backstroke	25.65	23	did not advance			
Björn Seeliger	100 m backstroke	55.89	36	did not advance			
Simon Sjödin	100 m butterfly	53.64	31	did not advance			
Simon Sjödin	200 m individual medley	2:00.65	11 Q	2:00.45	9	did not advance	
Johannes Skagius	50 m breaststroke	27.27	=9 Q	27.39	=10	did not advance	
Johannes Skagius	100 m breaststroke	1:01.24	24	did not advance			
Robin Hanson; Christoffer Carlsen; Björn Seeliger; Isak Eliasson	4x100 m freestyle relay	3:17.31	=10	—N/a		did not advance	
Victor Johansson; Robin Hanson; Gustaf Dahlman; Adam Paulsson	4x200 m freestyle relay	7:15.55	7 Q	—N/a		7:14.03	8
Gustav Hökfelt; Erik Persson; Simon Sjödin; Christoffer Carlsen	4x100 m medley relay	3:36.77	8 Q	—N/a		3:36.00	8

Women

Athlete	Event	Heat		Semifinal		Final	
Athlete	Event	Time	Rank	Time	Rank	Time	Rank
Hanna Eriksson	200 m freestyle	2:01.61	28	did not advance			
Hanna Eriksson	400 m freestyle	4:25.43	26	—N/a		did not advance	
Hanna Eriksson	800 m freestyle	8:58.55	17	—N/a		did not advance	
Hanna Eriksson	1500 m freestyle	17:25.11	15	—N/a		did not advance	
Jessica Eriksson	50 m breaststroke	31.77	18	did not advance			
Jessica Eriksson	100 m breaststroke	1:08.99	24	did not advance			
Jessica Eriksson	200 m breaststroke	2:32.41	28	did not advance			
Louise Hansson	100 m freestyle	55.81	25	did not advance			
Louise Hansson	200 m freestyle	did not start		did not advance			
Louise Hansson	50 m butterfly	26.50	=12 Q	26.54	13	did not advance	
Louise Hansson	100 m butterfly	58.52	7 Q	57.99	5 Q	57.89	6
Sophie Hansson	50 m breaststroke	30.79	7 Q	30.72	8 Q	31.23	8
Sophie Hansson	100 m breaststroke	1:07.70	7 Q	1:07.51	7 Q	1:07.67	8
Sophie Hansson	200 m breaststroke	2:31.05	21	did not advance			
Sara Junevik	100 m freestyle	57.24	39	did not advance			
Sara Junevik	50 m butterfly	26.50	=12	did not advance			
Sara Junevik	100 m butterfly	1:00.63	25	did not advance			
Magdalena Kuras	50 m freestyle	26.19	36	did not advance			
Magdalena Kuras	100 m freestyle	57.10	36	did not advance			
Magdalena Kuras	50 m backstroke	29.91	36	did not advance			
Ida Lindborg	50 m backstroke	28.23	10 Q	28.77	16	did not advance	
Ida Lindborg	100 m backstroke	1:02.00	26	did not advance			
Ida Lindborg	50 m butterfly	27.20	24	did not advance			
Sarah Sjöström	50 m freestyle	24.14	1 Q	23.92	2 Q	23.74 CR	1st place, gold medalist(s)
Sarah Sjöström	100 m freestyle	53.45	2 Q	52.67 CR	1 Q	52.93	1st place, gold medalist(s)
Sarah Sjöström	50 m butterfly	25.11	1 Q	25.51	1 Q	25.16	1st place, gold medalist(s)
Sarah Sjöström	100 m butterfly	56.87	1 Q	56.66	1 Q	56.13	1st place, gold medalist(s)
Louise Hansson; Ida Lindborg; Sara Junevik; Magdalena Kuras	4x100 m freestyle relay	3:43.17	10	—N/a		did not advance	
Ida Lindborg; Sophie Hansson; Louise Hansson; Magdalena Kuras	4x100 m medley relay	4:03.94	9	—N/a		did not advance	

Mixed

Athletes	Event	Heat		Final	
Athletes	Event	Time	Rank	Time	Rank
Christoffer Carlsen; Isak Eliasson; Ida Lindborg; Magdalena Kuras	4x100 m freestyle relay	3:31.40	9	did not advance	
Gustav Hökfelt; Johannes Skagius; Louise Hansson; Ida Lindborg; Magdalena Kuras*	4x100 m medley relay	3:49.58	7 Q	3:48.53	8

== Cycling ==
=== BMX ===
Athlete	Event	Motos		Round of 16		Quarterfinals		Semifinal		Final	
Athlete	Event	Points	Rank	Result	Rank	Result	Rank	Result	Rank	Result	Rank
Filip Svanberg	Men's race	19	6	did not advance							

=== Mountain biking ===
Athlete	Event	Time	Rank
Michael Olsson	Men's cross-country	1:40:07	39
Matthias Wengelin	Men's cross-country	1:39:23	37
Linn Gustafzzon	Women's cross-country	1:44:11	26

=== Road ===
Athlete	Event	Time	Rank
Lucas Eriksson	Men's road race		
Gustav Höög	Men's road race		
Richard Larssen	Men's road race		
Tobias Ludvigsson	Men's road race		
Tobias Ludvigsson	Men's time trial	56:44.50	19
Emilia Fahlin	Women's road race	3:28:15	15
Sara Mustonen	Women's road race	did not finish	
Hanna Nilsson	Women's road race	3:28:30	28
Sara Penton	Women's road race	3:32:02	45

== Golf ==
Sweden was represented by seven teams: two men's, three women's, and two mixed.

Men

Team	Event	Pool play				Semifinal	Final / BM	
Team	Event	Opposition Score	Opposition Score	Opposition Score	Rank	Opposition Score	Opposition Score	Rank
Per Längfors; Johan Edfors	Men's team	Jennevret / Florén (SWE); L 1 down	Shinkwin / Slattery (GBR); L 6 & 5	Tarrío / Borda (ESP); L 3 & 2	4	did not advance		
Daniel Jennevret; Oscar Florén	Men's team	Längfors / Edfors (SWE); W 1 up	Tarrío / Borda (ESP); L 1 down	Shinkwin / Slattery (GBR); W 3 & 2	2	did not advance		

Women

Team	Event	Pool play				Semifinal	Final / BM	
Team	Event	Opposition Score	Opposition Score	Opposition Score	Rank	Opposition Score	Opposition Score	Rank
Emma Nilsson; Lina Boqvist	Women's team	Matthew / Clyburn (GBR); L 3 & 2	Persson / Wessberg (SWE); W 5 & 4	Skarpnord / Engzelius (NOR); L 2 & 1	4	did not advance		
Johanna Gustavsson; Julia Engström	Women's team	Dreher / Mollé (FRA); L 2 & 1	Cowan / Lampert (GER); W 3 & 2	Herbin / Vayson de Pradei (FRA); W 4 & 3	2	did not advance		
Cajsa Persson; Linda Wessberg	Women's team	Skarpnord / Engzelius (NOR); W 5 & 4	Nilsson / Boqvist (SWE); L 5 & 4	Matthew / Clyburn (GBR); W 2 up	1 Q	Hall / Davies (GBR); W 1 up	Dreher / Mollé (FRA); W 20 holes	1st place, gold medalist(s)

Mixed

Athletes	Event	Score	Par	Rank
Per Längfors; Lina Boqvist; Johan Edfors; Emma Nilsson	Mixed team	145	+1	=5
Daniel Jennevret; Julia Engström; Oscar Florén; Johanna Gustavsson	Mixed team	143	−1	3rd place, bronze medalist(s)

== Gymnastics ==
Men

Athlete	Event	Qualification		Final	
Athlete	Event	Points	Rank	Points	Rank
Karl Idesjö	Horizontal bar	12.866	32	did not advance	
Karl Idesjö	Parallel bars	13.633	30	did not advance	
Karl Idesjö	Rings	12.766	54	did not advance	
Filip Lidbeck	Floor	9.700	92	did not advance	
Filip Lidbeck	Horizontal bar	12.166	58	did not advance	
Filip Lidbeck	Vault	11.600	25	did not advance	

Women

Athlete	Event	Qualification		Final	
Athlete	Event	Points	Rank	Points	Rank
Jonna Adlerteg	Uneven bars	14.600	1 Q	14.533	2nd place, silver medalist(s)
Jessica Castles	Balance beam	11.500	45	did not advance	
Jessica Castles	Floor	13.100	6 Q	12.800	7

== Rowing ==
A total of four athletes have been selected to the Swedish team.

Athlete	Event	Heats		Repechage		Semifinals		Final	
Athlete	Event	Time	Rank	Time	Rank	Time	Rank	Time	Rank
Anders Backéus	Men's single sculls	7:08.13	4 R	7:01.06	3 SF	7:09.50	6 FB	7:02.24	12
Filip Nilsson; Mattias Johansson	Men's lightweight double sculls	6:40.88	5 R	6:40.48	5 FC	did not advance		6:33.89	15
Emma Fredh	Women's lightweight single sculls	7:57.56	2 FA	BYE		—N/a		7:51.57	5

== Triathlon ==
Athlete	Event	Swim (1.5 km)	Trans 1	Bike (40 km)	Trans 2	Run (10 km)	Total time	Rank
Gabriel Sandör	Men's individual	17:39	1:07	58:57	0:34	32:53	1:51:10	23
Ludwig Fleetwood	Men's individual	17:56	0:56	1:04:16	0:29	37:22	2:00:59	49
