= Athletics at the 2000 Summer Olympics – Men's high jump =

Men's high jump at the Games of the XXVII Olympiad
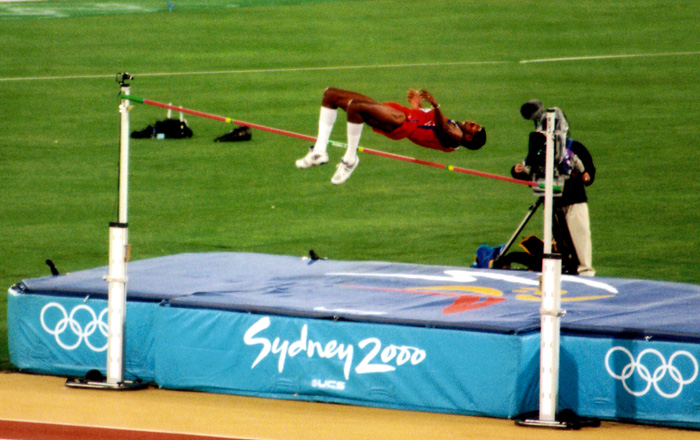
- Silver medallist Javier Sotomayor
- Venue: Stadium Australia
- Dates: 22 September 2000 (qualifying); 24 September 2000 (final)
- Competitors: 35 from 24 nations
- Winning height: 2.35

Medalists
1st place, gold medalist(s)		Sergey Klyugin; Russia
2nd place, silver medalist(s)		Javier Sotomayor; Cuba
3rd place, bronze medalist(s)		Abderrahmane Hammad; Algeria

The men's high jump event at the 2000 Summer Olympics as part of the athletics program was held at the Olympic Stadium on Friday, 22 September and Sunday, 24 September. Thirty-five athletes from 24 nations competed. The maximum number of athletes per nation had been set at 3 since the 1930 Olympic Congress. The high jump has been ever present since the beginning of the modern Olympic Games in 1896. The event was won by Sergey Klyugin of Russia, the nation's first medal and victory in the men's high jump in the nation's first appearance after the breakup of the Soviet Union. Javier Sotomayor of Cuba was the eighth man to win a second medal in the event (and first to do so in non-consecutive Games, earning his first in 1992); he joined Valeriy Brumel and Jacek Wszoła as the most successful Olympic high jumpers in history with a gold and a silver—despite missing the 1984 and 1988 Games due to boycott and being hampered by injury in 1996. Abderrahmane Hammad's bronze was Algeria's first medal in the men's high jump.

== Background ==
This was the 24th appearance of the event, which is one of 12 athletics events to have been held at every Summer Olympics. The returning finalists from the 1996 Games were gold medalist Charles Austin of the United States, fourth-place finisher (and 1992 finalist) Dragutin Topić of Yugoslavia, seventh-place finisher Tim Forsyth of Australia, eighth-place finisher Lee Jin-taek of South Korea, ninth-place finisher Wolfgang Kreißig of Germany, and twelfth-place finisher (and 1992 gold medalist) Javier Sotomayor of Cuba. Sotomayor, healthy again after being limited in 1992 due to an ankle injury, had been suspended after testing positive for cocaine but was reinstated before the Games. He and Austin were medal contenders (both hoping to become the first man to win two gold medals in the high jump), but the favorite was world champion Vyacheslav Voronin of Russia.

Belarus, Bosnia and Herzegovina, Kazakhstan, Lebanon, New Zealand, and Russia each made their debut in the event. The United States made its 23rd appearance, most of any nation, having missed only the boycotted 1980 Games.

== Qualification ==
Each National Olympic Committee was permitted to enter up to three athletes that had jumped 2.28 metres or higher during the qualification period. The maximum number of athletes per nation had been set at 3 since the 1930 Olympic Congress. If an NOC had no athletes that qualified under that standard, one athlete that had jumped 2.25 metres or higher could be entered.

== Competition format ==
The competition used the two-round format introduced in 1912. There were two distinct rounds of jumping with results cleared between rounds. Jumpers were eliminated if they had three consecutive failures, whether at a single height or between multiple heights if they attempted to advance before clearing a height.

The qualifying round had the bar set at 2.15 metres, 2.20 metres, 2.24 metres, 2.27 metres, and 2.30 metres. All jumpers clearing 2.30 metres in the qualifying round advanced to the final. If fewer than 12 jumpers could achieve it, the top 12 (including ties) would advance to the final.

The final had jumps at 2.20 metres, 2.25 metres, 2.29 metres, 2.32 metres, and 2.35 metres.

== Records ==
These were the standing world and Olympic records (in metres) prior to the 2000 Summer Olympics.

World record	Javier Sotomayor (CUB)	2.45	Salamanca, Spain	27 July 1993
Olympic record	Charles Austin (USA)	2.39	Atlanta, United States	28 July 1996

No new world or Olympic records were set during the competition.

== Schedule ==
All times are Australian Eastern Standard Time (UTC+10)

Date	Time	Round
Friday, 22 September 2000	19:25	Qualifying
Sunday, 24 September 2000	18:10	Final

== Results ==
Key

- o = Height cleared
- x = Height failed
- – = Height passed
- r = Retired
- SB = Season's best
- PB = Personal best
- NR = National record
- AR = Area record
- OR = Olympic record
- WR = World record
- WL = World lead
- NM = No mark
- DNS = Did not start
- DQ = Disqualified

All distances shown are in meters.

=== Qualifying ===
The qualifying round was held on Friday, 22 September 2000. The qualifying height was 2.30 metres. The remaining spaces in the final were filled by the highest jumps until there were at least 12 qualifiers. After only 13 athletes clear 2.27 metres, no jumpers attempted 2.30 metres and all 13 advanced.

Qualification: 2.30 m (Q) or best 12 performances (q)

Rank	Group	Athlete	Nation	2.15	2.20	2.24	2.27	Height	Notes
1	A	Stefan Holm	Sweden	–	o	o	o	2.27	q
1	A	Konstantin Matusevich	Israel	o	o	o	o	2.27	q
1	B	Wolfgang Kreissig	Germany	–	o	o	o	2.27	q
1	B	Vyacheslav Voronin	Russia	–	o	o	o	2.27	q
5	A	Sergey Kliugin	Russia	–	xo	o	o	2.27	q
6	B	Nathan Leeper	United States	–	o	xxo	o	2.27	q
7	A	Abderrahmane Hammad	Algeria	–	o	o	xo	2.27	q
7	B	Kwaku Boateng	Canada	o	–	o	xo	2.27	q
7	B	Sergii Dymchenko	Ukraine	o	o	o	xo	2.27	q
7	B	Staffan Strand	Sweden	–	o	o	xo	2.27	q
7	B	Javier Sotomayor	Cuba	–	o	–	xo	2.27	q
12	B	Kenny Evans	United States	o	xo	o	xo	2.27	q
13	A	Mark Boswell	Canada	–	o	xo	xxo	2.27	q
14	A	Elvir Krehmić	Bosnia and Herzegovina	o	o	o	xxx	2.24	
14	A	Tim Forsyth	Australia	o	o	o	xxx	2.24	
16	A	Christian Rhoden	Germany	o	o	xo	xxx	2.24	
16	A	Andriy Sokolovskyy	Ukraine	o	o	xo	xxx	2.24	
16	A	Mika Polku	Finland	o	o	xo	xxx	2.24	
19	A	Yuriy Pakhlyayev	Kazakhstan	o	o	xxo	xxx	2.24	
20	A	Charles Austin	United States	–	o	x–	xx	2.20	
21	B	Lee Jin-taek	South Korea	x–	o	xxx	—	2.20	
21	B	Dragutin Topić	FR Yugoslavia	xo	o	xx–	x	2.20	
23	B	Wilbert Pennings	Netherlands	–	xo	–	xxx	2.20	
23	B	Brendan Reilly	Ireland	–	xo	xxx	—	2.20	
23	B	Gilmar Mayo	Colombia	o	xo	xxx	—	2.20	
26	B	Toni Huikuri	Finland	o	xxo	xxx	—	2.20	
27	A	Benjamin Challenger	Great Britain	o	xxx	—		2.15	
27	A	Ruslan Glyvynskyy	Ukraine	o	xxx	—		2.15	
27	A	Takahisa Yoshida	Japan	o	xxx	—		2.15	
27	A	Stevan Zorić	FR Yugoslavia	o	xxx	—		2.15	
27	B	Pyotr Brayko	Russia	o	xxx	—		2.15	
27	B	Glenn Howard	New Zealand	o	xxx	—		2.15	
33	A	Jean-Claude Rabbath	Lebanon	xo	xxx	—		2.15	
34	A	Aleksei Lelin	Belarus	xxo	xxx	—		2.15	
–	B	Hugo Muñoz	Peru	xxx	—			No mark	
–	B	Labros Papakostas	Greece	DNS					

=== Final ===
Rank	Athlete	Nation	2.20	2.25	2.29	2.32	2.35	Height	Notes
1st place, gold medalist(s)	Sergey Kliugin	Russia	o	–	o	xo	o	2.35	SB
2nd place, silver medalist(s)	Javier Sotomayor	Cuba	–	o	–	o	xxx	2.32	SB
3rd place, bronze medalist(s)	Abderrahmane Hammad	Algeria	o	o	xo	o	xxx	2.32	
4	Stefan Holm	Sweden	o	o	xxo	o	xxx	2.32	
5	Konstantin Matusevich	Israel	o	o	o	xxo	xxx	2.32	
6	Mark Boswell	Canada	xo	o	–	xxo	xxx	2.32	
6	Staffan Strand	Sweden	–	xo	o	xxo	xxx	2.32	
8	Wolfgang Kreissig	Germany	o	o	o	xxx	—	2.29	
9	Sergii Dymchenko	Ukraine	o	xo	o	xxx	—	2.29	
10	Vyacheslav Voronin	Russia	o	o	xxo	xxx	—	2.29	
11	Nathan Leeper	United States	o	o	xxx	—		2.25	
12	Kwaku Boateng	Canada	xo	xo	xxx	—		2.25	
13	Kenny Evans	United States	xo	xxx	—			2.20	
