= 1997 World Championships in Athletics – Men's high jump =

These are the official results of the men's high jump event at the 1997 IAAF World Championships in Athens, Greece. There were a total number of 35 participating athletes, with two qualifying groups and the final held on Wednesday 1997-08-06.

== Medalists ==
Gold	Javier Sotomayor; Cuba (CUB)
Silver	Artur Partyka; Poland (POL)
Bronze	Tim Forsyth; Australia (AUS)

== Results ==
=== Qualifying round ===
4 August

Qualification: Qualifying Performance 2.28 (Q) or at least 12 best performers (q) advance to the final.

Rank	Group	Name	Nationality	2.15	2.19	2.23	2.26	2.28	Result	Notes
1	A	Gilmar Mayo	Colombia	o	o	o	o	o	2.28	Q, PB
1	A	Lee Jin-taek	South Korea	–	o	–	o	o	2.28	Q
1	B	Artur Partyka	Poland	–	o	–	o	o	2.28	Q
1	B	Javier Sotomayor	Cuba	–	–	o	o	o	2.28	Q
1	B	Steinar Hoen	Norway	–	–	o	–	o	2.28	Q
6	A	Lambros Papakostas	Greece	–	o	o	o	xo	2.28	Q
7	A	Martin Buß	Germany	o	xo	o	xo	xo	2.28	Q
8	B	Tim Forsyth	Australia	o	–	–	o	xxo	2.28	Q
9	B	Konstantin Matusevich	Israel	o	o	xo	xo	xxo	2.28	Q
10	B	Dalton Grant	Great Britain	–	xo	o	xxo	xxo	2.28	Q, SB
11	B	Jan Janků	Czech Republic	–	o	xo	o	xxx	2.26	q
12	B	Sergey Klyugin	Russia	o	xxo	o	o	xxx	2.26	q
13	A	Charles Austin	United States	–	o	–	xo	xxx	2.26	
14	B	Steve Smith	Great Britain	o	–	xo	xo	xxx	2.26	
15	A	Staffan Strand	Sweden	o	–	o	xxx		2.23	
15	A	Charles Lefrançois	Canada	–	o	o	xxx		2.23	
15	B	Didier Detchénique	France	o	o	o	xxx		2.23	
15	B	Stevan Zorić	Yugoslavia	–	o	o	xxx		2.23	
15	B	Brian Brown	United States	o	–	o	xxx		2.23	
20	B	Dimitrios Kokotis	Greece	xxo	o	o	xxx		2.23	
20	B	Mustapha Raifak	France	xxo	o	o	xxx		2.23	
22	A	Jarosław Kotewicz	Poland	o	–	xo	xxx		2.23	
22	A	Mark Boswell	Canada	–	o	xo	xxx		2.23	
22	A	Mark Mandy	Ireland	o	o	xo	xx–	x	2.23	
22	A	Dragutin Topić	Yugoslavia	o	–	xo	–	xxx	2.23	
26	A	Elvir Krehmić	Bosnia and Herzegovina	xxo	o	xo	xxx		2.23	
27	A	Brendan Reilly	Great Britain	–	o	xxo	xx–	x	2.23	
28	A	Arturo Ortíz	Spain	–	o	–	xxx		2.19	
28	A	Tomáš Janků	Czech Republic	o	o	xxx			2.19	
30	A	Randy Jenkins	United States	xxo	xxo	–	xxx		2.19	
31	A	Konstantinos Liapis	Greece	o	xxx				2.15	
31	B	Glenn Howard	New Zealand	o	xxx				2.15	
31	B	Julio Luciano	Dominican Republic	o	xxx				2.15	
34	B	Michiya Onoue	Japan	xo	xxx				2.15	
35	B	Khemraj Naiko	Mauritius	xxo	xxx				2.15	

=== Final ===
Rank	Name	Nationality	2.20	2.25	2.29	2.32	2.35	2.37	2.39	Result	Notes
1st place, gold medalist(s)	Javier Sotomayor	Cuba	–	xo	–	o	o	xo	–	2.37	WL
2nd place, silver medalist(s)	Artur Partyka	Poland	o	–	o	–	xo	xx–	x	2.35	SB
3rd place, bronze medalist(s)	Tim Forsyth	Australia	o	–	xo	o	xo	x–	xx	2.35	
4	Steinar Hoen	Norway	–	o	o	o	xx–	x		2.32	
4	Dalton Grant	Great Britain	–	–	–	o	xxx			2.32	SB
6	Lambros Papakostas	Greece	–	o	o	xo	xx–	x		2.32	SB
7	Konstantin Matusevich	Israel	o	o	o	xxx				2.29	
8	Lee Jin-taek	South Korea	xo	o	o	xxx				2.29	
9	Martin Buß	Germany	xxo	o	o	xxx				2.29	
10	Gilmar Mayo	Colombia	o	o	xo	xxx				2.29	
11	Sergey Klyugin	Russia	xo	xo	xxo	r				2.29	
12	Jan Janků	Czech Republic	o	o	xxx					2.25	

== See also ==
- 1994 Men's European Championships high jump
- 1995 Men's World Championships high jump
- 1996 Men's Olympic high jump
- 1998 Men's European Championships high jump
- 1999 Men's World Championships high jump
