= 2003 World Championships in Athletics – Men's high jump =

These are the official results of the Men's High Jump event at the 2003 World Championships in Paris, France. There were a total number of 32 participating athletes, with the final held on Monday 25 August 2003.

== Medalists ==
| Gold | Jacques Freitag; South Africa (RSA) |
| Silver | Stefan Holm; Sweden (SWE) |
| Bronze | Mark Boswell; Canada (CAN) |

== Schedule ==
- All times are Central European Time (UTC+1)

Qualification Round
| Group A | Group B |
|---|---|
| 23.08.2003 – 17:40h | 23.08.2003 – 17:40h |
Final Round
25.08.2003 – 19:00h

== Abbreviations ==
- All results shown are in metres

| Q | automatic qualification |
| q | qualification by rank |
| DNS | did not start |
| NM | no mark |
| WR | world record |
| AR | area record |
| NR | national record |
| PB | personal best |
| SB | season best |

== Results ==
=== Qualification ===
Qualification: 2.29 m (Q) or best 12 performances (q)

| Rank | Group | Name | Nationality | 2.15 | 2.20 | 2.25 | 2.27 | 2.29 | Result | Notes |
|---|---|---|---|---|---|---|---|---|---|---|
| 1 | A | Mikhail Tsvetkov | Russia | o | o | o | o | o | 2.29 | Q |
| 2 | A | Stefan Holm | Sweden | – | o | xo | o | o | 2.29 | Q |
| 2 | B | Andriy Sokolovskyy | Ukraine | o | o | o | xo | o | 2.29 | Q |
| 4 | B | Jaroslav Bába | Czech Republic | o | xo | xo | xo | o | 2.29 | Q |
| 5 | A | Jamie Nieto | United States | – | o | o | o | xo | 2.29 | Q |
| 5 | B | Jacques Freitag | South Africa | – | o | o | o | xo | 2.29 | Q |
| 7 | B | Germaine Mason | Jamaica | – | o | xo | xo | xo | 2.29 | Q |
| 8 | B | Grzegorz Sposób | Poland | o | xo | xo | xo | xxo | 2.29 | Q |
| 9 | A | Mark Boswell | Canada | – | o | o | o | xxx | 2.27 | q |
| 10 | A | Yaroslav Rybakov | Russia | – | o | xo | o | xxx | 2.27 | q |
| 10 | B | Roman Fricke | Germany | xo | o | o | o | xxx | 2.27 | q, PB |
| 12 | A | Aleksander Waleriańczyk | Poland | o | o | o | xxo | xxx | 2.27 | q |
| 12 | B | Matt Hemingway | United States | o | o | o | xxo | xxx | 2.27 | q |
| 14 | A | Hennazdy Maroz | Belarus | o | o | xo | xxo | xxx | 2.27 | |
| 15 | B | Andrei Chubsa | Belarus | o | xxo | xxo | xxo | xxx | 2.27 | |
| 16 | A | Tomáš Janků | Czech Republic | o | o | o | xxx | | 2.25 | |
| 16 | B | Martin Stauffer | Switzerland | o | o | o | xxx | | 2.25 | |
| 16 | B | Aleksey Lesnichiy | Belarus | o | o | o | xxx | | 2.25 | |
| 19 | B | Alessandro Talotti | Italy | o | xo | o | xxx | | 2.25 | |
| 20 | A | Andrea Bettinelli | Italy | – | xxo | o | xxx | | 2.25 | |
| 21 | A | Stefan Vasilache | Romania | o | o | xxo | xxx | | 2.25 | |
| 22 | A | Michał Bieniek | Poland | o | o | xxx | | | 2.20 | |
| 22 | A | Fabrício Romero | Brazil | o | o | xxx | | | 2.20 | |
| 22 | A | Staffan Strand | Sweden | – | o | xxx | | | 2.20 | |
| 22 | B | Abderrahmane Hammad | Algeria | o | o | xxx | | | 2.20 | |
| 22 | B | Pyotr Brayko | Russia | o | o | xxx | | | 2.20 | |
| 27 | A | Oskari Frösén | Finland | xo | o | xxx | | | 2.20 | |
| 27 | B | Wilbert Pennings | Netherlands | xo | o | xxx | | | 2.20 | |
| 29 | A | Rožle Prezelj | Slovenia | o | xo | xxx | | | 2.20 | |
| 29 | B | Nicola Ciotti | Italy | o | xo | xxx | | | 2.20 | |
| 31 | B | Tora Harris | United States | o | xxo | xxx | | | 2.20 | |
| | A | Alfredo Deza | Peru | xxx | | | | | NM | |

=== Final ===
| Rank | Name | Nationality | 2.15 | 2.20 | 2.25 | 2.29 | 2.32 | 2.35 | Result | Notes |
|---|---|---|---|---|---|---|---|---|---|---|
| 1st place, gold medalist(s) | Jacques Freitag | South Africa | – | o | xo | o | o | xo | 2.35 | SB |
| 2nd place, silver medalist(s) | Stefan Holm | Sweden | – | o | o | o | xo | xxx | 2.32 | |
| 3rd place, bronze medalist(s) | Mark Boswell | Canada | – | – | o | – | xxo | xxx | 2.32 | SB |
| 4 | Mikhail Tsvetkov | Russia | o | o | o | o | xxx | | 2.29 | |
| 5 | Germaine Mason | Jamaica | – | xo | xo | o | xxx | | 2.29 | |
| 6 | Grzegorz Sposób | Poland | xo | xxo | o | o | xxx | | 2.29 | |
| 7 | Jamie Nieto | United States | – | o | o | xo | xxx | | 2.29 | |
| 8 | Andriy Sokolovskyy | Ukraine | o | o | xo | xxo | xxx | | 2.29 | |
| 9 | Yaroslav Rybakov | Russia | – | o | o | xxx | | | 2.25 | |
| 10 | Aleksander Waleriańczyk | Poland | xo | xo | o | xxx | | | 2.25 | |
| 11 | Jaroslav Bába | Czech Republic | o | o | xxo | xxx | | | 2.25 | |
| 12 | Matt Hemingway | United States | – | xo | xxo | xxx | | | 2.25 | |
| 13 | Roman Fricke | Germany | xo | o | xxx | | | | 2.20 | |

== See also ==
- Athletics at the 2003 Pan American Games – Men's high jump
- 2003 High Jump Year Ranking
