= 1998 European Athletics Indoor Championships – Men's high jump =

The men's high jump event at the 1998 European Athletics Indoor Championships was held on 27 February–1 March.

== Medalists ==
Gold	Silver	Bronze
Artur Partyka; Poland	Vyacheslav Voronin; Russia	Tomáš Janků; Czech Republic

== Results ==
=== Qualification ===
Qualification performance: 2.24 (Q) or at least 12 best performers (q) advanced to the final.

Rank	Group	Athlete	Nationality	2.00	2.10	2.15	2.20	2.24	Result	Notes
1	A	Tomáš Janků	Czech Republic	–	–	o	o	o	2.24	Q
1	A	Jan Janků	Czech Republic	–	–	o	o	o	2.24	Q
1	B	Ben Challenger	Great Britain	–	–	–	o	o	2.24	Q
1	B	Dragutin Topić	Yugoslavia	–	–	o	o	o	2.24	Q
1	B	Vyacheslav Voronin	Russia	–	o	o	o	o	2.24	Q
1	B	Ignacio Pérez	Spain	–	–	o	o	o	2.24	Q
7	A	Ettore Ceresoli	Italy	–	o	xo	o	o	2.24	Q
8	A	Dimitrios Kokotis	Greece	–	–	o	o	xo	2.24	Q
8	A	Artur Partyka	Poland	–	–	o	–	xo	2.24	Q
8	B	Lambros Papakostas	Greece	–	–	–	o	xo	2.24	Q
11	A	Itay Margalit	Israel	–	o	o	o	xxx	2.20	q
11	A	Elvir Krehmić	Bosnia and Herzegovina	–	o	o	o	xxx	2.20	q
11	A	Ramon Kaju	Estonia	–	o	o	o	xxx	2.20	q
11	A	Antoine Burke	Ireland	o	o	o	o	xxx	2.20	q
15	A	Didier Detchénique	France	–	–	xo	o	xxx	2.20	
15	B	Konstantinos Liapis	Greece	–	–	xo	o	xxx	2.20	
17	A	Mark Mandy	Ireland	–	o	xo	xo	xxx	2.20	
18	B	Wilbert Pennings	Netherlands	–	–	xxo	xo	xxx	2.20	
19	A	Stefan Holm	Sweden	–	o	o	xxo	xxx	2.20	
20	B	Alex Rosen	Israel	–	o	xxx			2.10	
20	B	Mustapha Raifak	France	–	o	xxx			2.10	

=== Final ===
Rank	Athlete	Nationality	2.12	2.17	2.22	2.26	2.29	2.31	2.33	Result	Notes
1st place, gold medalist(s)	Artur Partyka	Poland	–	o	–	o	o	xo	xxx	2.31	
2nd place, silver medalist(s)	Vyacheslav Voronin	Russia	–	xo	o	o	o	xxo	xxx	2.31	
3rd place, bronze medalist(s)	Tomáš Janků	Czech Republic	o	o	o	o	o	xxx		2.29	
4	Jan Janků	Czech Republic	–	o	xxo	o	xx–	x		2.26	
5	Lambros Papakostas	Greece	–	–	o	xxo	x–	xx		2.26	
6	Dragutin Topić	Yugoslavia	–	–	o	xxx				2.22	
6	Elvir Krehmić	Bosnia and Herzegovina	o	o	o	xxx				2.22	
8	Dimitrios Kokotis	Greece	o	xo	o	xxx				2.22	
9	Itay Margalit	Israel	xo	xxo	o	xxx				2.22	
10	Ettore Ceresoli	Italy	o	o	xo	xxx				2.22	
10	Ramon Kaju	Estonia	o	o	xo	xxx				2.22	
10	Ben Challenger	Great Britain	–	o	xo	xxx				2.22	
13	Antoine Burke	Ireland	o	xo	xxo	–	xx–	x		2.22	
14	Ignacio Pérez	Spain	–	xo	xxx					2.17	
