= Athletics at the 1999 Summer Universiade – Men's high jump =

The men's high jump event at the 1999 Summer Universiade was held at the Estadio Son Moix in Palma de Mallorca, Spain on 12 and 13 July.

== Medalists ==
Gold	Silver	Bronze
Ben Challenger; Great Britain	Mark Boswell; Canada	Lee Jin-taek; South Korea

== Results ==
=== Qualification ===
Qualification: 2.25 (Q) or at least 12 best performers (q) advance to the final

Rank	Group	Athlete	Nationality	2.00	2.10	2.15	2.20	Result	Notes
1	A	Jean-Claude Rabbath	Lebanon					2.20	q
2	A	Mark Boswell	Canada					2.20	q
2	A	Stefan Holm	Sweden					2.20	q
4	A	Christian Rhoden	Germany					2.20	q
5	A	Mika Polku	Finland					2.20	q
6	A	Raúl Lozano	Spain	o	o	o	xxx	2.15	
7	A	Felipe Apablaza	Chile					2.15	
8	A	Luke Russell	Australia					2.15	
9	A	Marko Alekseyev	Estonia					2.10	
9	A	Jamie Nieto	United States					2.10	
11	A	Johnway Okonobo	Nigeria					2.10	
12	A	Roshan	India					2.00	
13	A	Anders Møller	Denmark					1.90	
	A	Andriy Sokolovskyy	Ukraine					NM	
1	B	Wilbert Pennings	Netherlands					2.20	q
2	B	Ramon Kaju	Estonia					2.20	q
2	B	Ben Challenger	Great Britain					2.20	q
2	B	Lee Jin-taek	South Korea					2.20	q
5	B	Kenny Evans	United States					2.20	q
6	B	Michael Ponikvar	Canada					2.20	q
6	B	Staffan Strand	Sweden					2.20	q
8	B	Đorđe Niketić	Yugoslavia					2.15	
9	B	Ignacio Pérez	Spain	o	o	xo	xxx	2.15	
10	B	Fana Mtshatsheni	South Africa					2.10	
11	B	Angel Kararadev	Bulgaria					2.10	
12	B	Chan Ming Sang	Hong Kong					2.00	
13	B	Martin Gartner	Denmark					2.00	
	A	Tomáš Janků	Czech Republic	–	–	–	xxx	NM	

=== Final ===
Rank	Athlete	Nationality	2.15	2.19	2.22	2.25	2.28	2.30	2.32	Result	Notes
1st place, gold medalist(s)	Ben Challenger	Great Britain	o	–	o	o	xo	xo	xxx	2.30	PB
2nd place, silver medalist(s)	Mark Boswell	Canada	o	–	xo	o	xxo	xo	xxx	2.30	
3rd place, bronze medalist(s)	Lee Jin-taek	South Korea	o	o	–	o	xxo	xxx		2.28	SB
4	Stefan Holm	Sweden								2.25	
5	Kenny Evans	United States								2.25	
6	Ramon Kaju	Estonia								2.22	
6	Jean-Claude Rabbath	Lebanon								2.22	
8	Wilbert Pennings	Netherlands								2.19	
9	Mika Polku	Finland								2.19	
10	Michael Ponikvar	Canada								2.15	
11	Christian Rhoden	Germany								2.15	
	Staffan Strand	Sweden								NM	
