= 2002 European Athletics Indoor Championships – Men's high jump =

The men's high jump event at the 2002 European Athletics Indoor Championships was held on March 2–3.

== Medalists ==
Gold	Silver	Bronze
Staffan Strand; Sweden	Stefan Holm; Sweden	Yaroslav Rybakov; Russia

== Results ==
=== Qualification ===
Qualification: Qualification Performance 2.26 (Q) or at least 8 best performers advanced to the final.

Rank	Athlete	Nationality	2.12	2.17	2.22	2.26	Result	Notes
1	Pavel Fomenko	Russia	o	o	o	o	2.26	Q
1	Stefan Holm	Sweden	–	o	o	o	2.26	Q
1	Yaroslav Rybakov	Russia	–	o	o	o	2.26	Q
1	Andriy Sokolovskyy	Ukraine	o	o	o	o	2.26	Q
1	Staffan Strand	Sweden	–	–	o	o	2.26	Q
6	Tomáš Janků	Czech Republic	o	o	x–	xo	2.26	Q
7	Joan Charmant	France	o	o	o	xxx	2.22	q
7	Gennadiy Moroz	Belarus	o	o	o	xxx	2.22	q
7	Wilbert Pennings	Netherlands	–	o	o	xxx	2.22	q
7	Svatoslav Ton	Czech Republic	o	o	o	xxx	2.22	q
11	Martin Stauffer	Switzerland	o	xo	o	xxx	2.22	
12	Grzegorz Sposób	Poland	o	o	xo	xxx	2.22	
13	Jan Janku	Czech Republic	–	xo	xo	xxx	2.22	
14	Pyotr Brayko	Russia	o	o	xxo	xxx	2.22	
14	Ştefan Vasilache	Romania	o	o	xxo	xxx	2.22	
16	Andrea Bettinelli	Italy	o	xo	xxo	xxx	2.22	
17	Dimitrios Kokotis	Greece	–	o	xxx		2.17	
17	Rozle Prezelj	Slovenia	o	o	xxx		2.17	
19	Metin Durmuşoğlu	Turkey	o	xo	xxx		2.17	
19	Román Fehér	Hungary	o	xo	xxx		2.17	
19	Aleksandr Veryutin	Belarus	o	xo	xxx		2.17	
22	Yiannos Constantinou	Cyprus	o	xxo	xxx		2.17	
22	Elvir Krehmić	Bosnia and Herzegovina	o	xxo	xxx		2.17	
24	Nicola Ciotti	Italy	xo	xxo	xxx		2.17	
24	Luboš Benko	Slovakia	xo	xxo	xxx		2.17	
26	Rafael Gonçalves	Portugal	xxo	xxo	xxx		2.17	
27	Marko Aleksejev	Estonia	xo	xxx			2.12	
27	Mickaël Hanany	France	xo	xxx			2.12	

=== Final ===
Rank	Athlete	Nationality	2.20	2.24	2.27	2.30	2.32	2.34	2.36	2.38	Result	Notes
1st place, gold medalist(s)	Staffan Strand	Sweden	–	o	–	o	–	xo	–	xxx	2.34	
2nd place, silver medalist(s)	Stefan Holm	Sweden	–	o	–	o	–	xx–	x		2.30	
3rd place, bronze medalist(s)	Yaroslav Rybakov	Russia	o	o	o	xo	–	xx–	x		2.30	
4	Andriy Sokolovskyy	Ukraine	o	xxo	o	xxx					2.27	
5	Joan Charmant	France	o	o	xxx						2.24	
6	Tomáš Janků	Czech Republic	xxo	o	xxx						2.24	
7	Gennadiy Moroz	Belarus	–	xo	–	xxx					2.24	
7	Wilbert Pennings	Netherlands	o	xo	xxx						2.24	
9	Pavel Fomenko	Russia	xo	xo	xxx						2.24	
10	Svatoslav Ton	Czech Republic	o	xxx							2.20	
