= 2003 IAAF World Indoor Championships – Men's high jump =

The men's high jump event at the 2003 IAAF World Indoor Championships was held on March 14–15.

== Medalists ==
Gold	Silver	Bronze
Stefan Holm; Sweden	Yaroslav Rybakov; Russia	Hennazdy Maroz; Belarus

== Results ==
=== Qualification ===
Qualification: Qualification Performance 2.29 (Q) or at least 8 best performers advanced to the final.

Rank	Group	Athlete	Nationality	2.20	2.25	2.27	2.29	Result	Notes
1	A	Hennazdy Maroz	Belarus	o	o	o	xo	2.29	Q
2	B	Dragutin Topić	Serbia and Montenegro	xo	o	xo	–	2.27	q
3	A	Tomáš Janku	Czech Republic	o	o	xxx		2.25	q
3	B	Stefan Holm	Sweden	o	o	–	–	2.25	q
3	B	Staffan Strand	Sweden	o	o	–	–	2.25	q
3	B	Mark Boswell	Canada	o	o	–	–	2.25	q
3	B	Yaroslav Rybakov	Russia	o	o	–	–	2.25	q
3	B	Andriy Sokolovskyy	Ukraine	o	o	–	–	2.25	q
3	B	Charles Austin	United States	o	o	–	–	2.25	q
3	B	Jaroslav Bába	Czech Republic	o	o	–	–	2.25	q
11	A	Andrea Bettinelli	Italy	o	xxo	xxx		2.25	
12	A	Mikhail Tsvetkov	Russia	xo	xxx			2.20	
12	A	Tora Harris	United States	xo	xx–	x		2.20	
12	A	Dalton Grant	Great Britain	xo	xxx			2.20	
	A	Germaine Mason	Jamaica	xxx				NM	
	A	Ştefan Vasilache	Romania					DQ	

=== Final ===
Rank	Athlete	Nationality	2.20	2.25	2.30	2.33	2.35	2.37	2.40	Result	Notes
1st place, gold medalist(s)	Stefan Holm	Sweden	o	o	o	xxo	xo	xx–	x	2.35	
2nd place, silver medalist(s)	Yaroslav Rybakov	Russia	o	o	xxo	xxo	x–	xx		2.33	
3rd place, bronze medalist(s)	Hennazdy Maroz	Belarus	o	xo	xo	xxx				2.30	PB
4	Dragutin Topić	Serbia and Montenegro	–	o	xxo	xx–	x			2.30	
5	Mark Boswell	Canada	o	o	xxx					2.25	
6	Tomáš Janku	Czech Republic	xo	o	xxx					2.25	
7	Staffan Strand	Sweden	o	xo	xxx					2.25	
8	Andriy Sokolovskyy	Ukraine	xxo	xo	xxx					2.25	
9	Jaroslav Bába	Czech Republic	xxo	xxo	xxx					2.25	
10	Charles Austin	United States	o	xxx						2.20	
