= 2002 European Athletics Championships – Men's high jump =

Men's high jump at the European Athletics Championships

The men's high jump at the 2002 European Athletics Championships were held at the Olympic Stadium on August 6–8.

== Medalists ==
Gold	Silver	Bronze
Yaroslav Rybakov; Russia	Stefan Holm; Sweden	Staffan Strand; Sweden

== Results ==
=== Qualification ===
Qualification: Qualifying Performance 2.28 (Q) or at least 12 best performers (q) advance to the final.

==== Group A ====
Rank	Name	Nationality	Result	Notes
1	Yaroslav Rybakov	Russia	2.20	q
1	Staffan Strand	Sweden	2.20	q
3	Wilbert Pennings	Netherlands	2.20	q
4	Martin Buß	Germany	2.20	q
4	Tomáš Janků	Czech Republic	2.20	q
6	Svatoslav Ton	Czech Republic	2.20	q
7	Grzegorz Sposób	Poland	2.15	
8	Luboš Benko	Slovakia	2.15	
9	Giulio Ciotti	Italy	2.15	
9	Rožle Prezelj	Slovenia	2.15	
	Dalton Grant	Great Britain	NM	
	Aleksey Lesnichyi	Belarus	NM	
	Konstantin Matusevich	Israel	NM	
	Ville Vepsalainen	Finland	NM	

==== Group B ====
Rank	Name	Nationality	Result	Notes
1	Grégory Gabella	France	2.20	q
1	Stefan Holm	Sweden	2.20	q
3	Pavel Fomenko	Russia	2.20	q
4	Jan Janků	Czech Republic	2.20	q
5	Alessandro Talotti	Italy	2.20	q
6	Aleksander Waleriańczyk	Poland	2.15	q
6	Oskari Frosen	Finland	2.15	q
6	Andrea Bettinelli	Italy	2.15	q
9	Hennazdy Maroz	Belarus	2.15	
10	Ben Challenger	Great Britain	2.15	
10	Ştefan Vasilache	Romania	2.15	
10	Martin Stauffer	Switzerland	2.15	
	Andrei Chubsa	Belarus	NM	
	Metin Durmuşoğlu	Turkey	NM	
	Dimitrios Sirrakos	Greece	NM	

=== Final ===
Rank	Name	Nationality	2.18	2.22	2.25	2.27	2.29	2.31	2.33	Result	Notes
1st place, gold medalist(s)	Yaroslav Rybakov	Russia	–	o	–	o	o	o	–	2.31	
2nd place, silver medalist(s)	Stefan Holm	Sweden	–	o	–	xo	o	xx–	x	2.29	
3rd place, bronze medalist(s)	Staffan Strand	Sweden	–	o	–	o	–	xxx		2.27	
4	Alessandro Talotti	Italy	o	xo	o	o	x–	xx		2.27	
5	Tomáš Janků	Czech Republic	xo	xo	o	xxx				2.25	
6	Svatoslav Ton	Czech Republic	o	o	xo	xxx				2.25	
7	Martin Buß	Germany	xo	o	xxo	xxx				2.25	
8	Jan Janků	Czech Republic	–	xo	xxx					2.22	
9	Andrea Bettinelli	Italy	o	xxx						2.18	
9	Oskari Frosen	Finland	o	xxx						2.18	
9	Grégory Gabella	France	o	–	xxx					2.18	
12	Pavel Fomenko	Russia	xo	xxx						2.18	
13	Wilbert Pennings	Netherlands	xxo	xxx						2.18	
13	Aleksander Waleriańczyk	Poland	xxo	xxx						2.18	
