= Martin Buß =

German high jumper

Medal record

Men's athletics

Representing Germany

World Championships
Gold medal – first place	2001 Edmonton	High jump
Bronze medal – third place	1999 Seville	High jump

Martin Buß (born 7 April 1976) is a German high jumper who won the gold medal at the 2001 World Championships in Edmonton, Alberta, Canada. He is a five-time outdoor national champion for Germany in the men's high jump event and three-time champion at the German Indoor Athletics Championships.

== Biography ==
Born in West Berlin, Buß took up the sport at the age of 17 and competed in his first World Championships in 1997, finishing ninth. At the 1999 World Championships in Seville, Spain he won a surprising bronze medal behind Vyacheslav Voronin and Mark Boswell. His jump of 2.32 metres was 5 cm behind the winner.

However, Buß came back two years later and won the gold medal at Edmonton with a jump of 2.36 m, beating Yaroslav Rybakov and old rival Voronin. Among the field which Martin beat was the legendary Javier Sotomayor. It marked a fine comeback after he suffered an injury to his Achilles tendon the year before.

He later missed both the 2000 and 2004 Summer Olympics through injury, and retired in late 2006 because of the persistent injury problems.

== International competitions ==
Year	Competition	Venue	Position	Notes
Representing Germany
1995	European Junior Championships	Nyíregyháza, Hungary	2nd	2.19 m
1997	European U23 Championships	Turku, Finland	2nd	2.24 m
1997	World Championships	Athens, Greece	9th	2.29 m
1998	European Championships	Budapest, Hungary	4th	2.32 m
1999	World Indoor Championships	Maebashi, Japan	4th	2.30 m
1999	World Championships	Seville, Spain	3rd	2.32 m
2000	European Indoor Championships	Ghent, Belgium	2nd	2.34 m
2001	World Indoor Championships	Lisbon, Portugal	6th	2.25 m
2001	World Championships	Edmonton, Canada	1st	2.36 m
2002	European Championships	Munich, Germany	7th	2.25 m

== National titles ==
- German Athletics Championships
  - High jump: 1997, 1998, 1999, 2001, 2002
- German Indoor Athletics Championships
  - High jump: 1999, 2000, 2001
