= 2005 World Championships in Athletics – Men's high jump =

The Men's High Jump event at the 2005 World Championships in Athletics was held at the Helsinki Olympic Stadium on August 12 and August 14.

== Medalists ==
Gold	Yuriy Krymarenko; Ukraine (UKR)
Silver	Víctor Moya; Cuba (CUB)
Silver	Yaroslav Rybakov; Russia (RUS)

== Results ==
=== Qualification ===
Qualification: 2.29 m (Q) or best 12 performances (q)

Rank	Group	Name	Nationality	2.15	2.20	2.24	2.27	Result	Notes
1	B	Stefan Holm	Sweden	–	o	o	o	2.27	q
1	B	Víctor Moya	Cuba	o	o	o	o	2.27	q
3	A	Nicola Ciotti	Italy	o	xo	xxo	o	2.27	q
3	A	Dragutin Topić	Serbia and Montenegro	o	xxo	xo	o	2.27	q
5	A	Jaroslav Bába	Czech Republic	–	o	o	xo	2.27	q
5	A	Vyacheslav Voronin	Russia	o	o	o	xo	2.27	q
7	B	Mark Boswell	Canada	o	–	xo	xo	2.27	q, SB
7	B	Kyriakos Ioannou	Cyprus	o	o	xo	xo	2.27	q, SB
9	A	Andriy Sokolovskyy	Ukraine	o	xxo	o	xo	2.27	q
10	A	Matt Hemingway	United States	–	o	xxo	xxo	2.27	q, SB
11	B	Yuriy Krymarenko	Ukraine	o	xxo	xo	xxo	2.27	q
12	A	Oskari Frösén	Finland	o	o	o	xxx	2.24	q
12	B	Yaroslav Rybakov	Russia	o	o	o	xxx	2.24	q
14	A	Ben Challenger	Great Britain	–	xo	o	xxx	2.24	
15	A	Jesse Williams	United States	o	o	xo	xxx	2.24	
16	B	Mickaël Hanany	France	o	o	xxo	xxx	2.24	
16	B	Andrea Bettinelli	Italy	o	o	xxo	xxx	2.24	
18	A	Grzegorz Sposób	Poland	o	o	x–		2.20	
18	B	Jacques Freitag	South Africa	o	o	xxx		2.20	
18	B	Kyle Lancaster	United States	o	o	xxx		2.20	
21	B	Svatoslav Ton	Czech Republic	o	xo	xxx		2.20	
22	B	Naoyuki Daigo	Japan	o	xxo	xxx		2.20	
23	A	László Boros	Hungary	o	xxx			2.15	
23	A	Jean-Claude Rabbath	Lebanon	o	xxx			2.15	
23	A	Andrey Tereshin	Russia	o	xxx			2.15	
23	A	Manjula Kumara Wijesekara	Sri Lanka	o	xxx			2.15	
27	A	Gennadiy Moroz	Belarus	xxo	xxx			2.15	
	B	Alessandro Talotti	Italy	xxx				NM	
	B	Ştefan Vasilache	Romania	xxx				NM	

=== Final ===
Rank	Name	Nationality	2.15	2.20	2.25	2.29	2.32	Result	Notes
1st place, gold medalist(s)	Yuriy Krymarenko	Ukraine	o	o	xo	o	xxo	2.32	
2nd place, silver medalist(s)	Víctor Moya	Cuba	o	o	o	o	xxx	2.29	PB
2nd place, silver medalist(s)	Yaroslav Rybakov	Russia	–	o	o	o	xxx	2.29	
4	Mark Boswell	Canada	–	o	xo	o	xxx	2.29	SB
5	Jaroslav Bába	Czech Republic	–	o	o	xo	xxx	2.29	
5	Nicola Ciotti	Italy	o	o	o	xo	xxx	2.29	
7	Stefan Holm	Sweden	–	o	xo	xo	xxx	2.29	
8	Vyacheslav Voronin	Russia	–	xo	o	xxo	xxx	2.29	
9	Dragutin Topić	Serbia and Montenegro	xo	o	o	xxx		2.25	
10	Kyriakos Ioannou	Cyprus	o	o	xo	xxx		2.25	
11	Oskari Frösén	Finland	–	xo	xxx			2.20	
11	Matt Hemingway	United States	–	xo	xxx			2.20	
13	Andriy Sokolovskyy	Ukraine	–	xxo	–	xxx		2.20	
