= 1996 World Junior Championships in Athletics – Men's high jump =

The men's high jump event at the 1996 World Junior Championships in Athletics was held in Sydney, Australia, at International Athletic Centre on 22 and 24 August.

== Medalists ==
Gold	Mark Boswell; Canada
Silver	Svatoslav Ton; Czech Republic
Silver	Ben Challenger; United Kingdom

== Results ==
=== Final ===
24 August

Rank	Name	Nationality	Result	Notes
1st place, gold medalist(s)	Mark Boswell	Canada	2.24	
2nd place, silver medalist(s)	Svatoslav Ton	Czech Republic	2.21	
2nd place, silver medalist(s)	Ben Challenger	United Kingdom	2.21	
4	Dave Furman	United States	2.18	
5	Toni Huikuri	Finland	2.18	
6	Dejan Vreljakovic	Yugoslavia	2.18	
7	James Brierley	United Kingdom	2.15	
7	Roman Fricke	Germany	2.15	
9	François Potgieter	South Africa	2.15	
10	Yannick Tregaro	Sweden	2.10	
11	Tivadar Kovács	Hungary	2.10	
12	Noriyasu Arai	Japan	2.05	

=== Qualifications ===
22 Aug

==== Group A ====
Rank	Name	Nationality	Result	Notes
1	Svatoslav Ton	Czech Republic	2.14	q
1	Toni Huikuri	Finland	2.14	q
1	James Brierley	United Kingdom	2.14	q
1	Noriyasu Arai	Japan	2.14	q
5	Yannick Tregaro	Sweden	2.14	q
5	Dejan Vreljakovic	Yugoslavia	2.14	q
7	Alfredo Deza	Peru	2.10	
8	Vagner Principe	Brazil	2.10	
9	Alberto Juantorena Jr.	Cuba	2.10	
10	Marcin Kaczocha	Poland	2.10	
11	Andrey Krasulya	Ukraine	2.05	
12	David Larsen	United States	2.05	
13	Ronald Garlett	Australia	2.00	
13	Oleg Prokopov	Belarus	2.00	
15	Felipe Apablaza	Chile	2.00	
16	Luis Soto Caballero	Puerto Rico	2.00	
	Zoltán Akacz	Hungary	NH	

==== Group B ====
Rank	Name	Nationality	Result	Notes
1	Mark Boswell	Canada	2.14	q
1	Ben Challenger	United Kingdom	2.14	q
1	Roman Fricke	Germany	2.14	q
1	Tivadar Kovács	Hungary	2.14	q
1	Dave Furman	United States	2.14	q
6	François Potgieter	South Africa	2.14	q
7	Sauli Niemi	Finland	2.10	
7	Katsuyoshi Miyamichi	Japan	2.10	
9	Marat Rakipov	Russia	2.10	
10	Adi Mordel	Israel	2.10	
11	Fabrício Romero	Brazil	2.10	
12	Abderahmane Hammad	Algeria	2.05	
12	Luke Temme	Australia	2.05	
14	Aleksey Lesnichiy	Belarus	2.05	
15	Ha Chung-Soo	South Korea	2.00	
16	Dejan Dokleja	Croatia	2.00	
	Fawzi Warsame	Somalia	NH	

== Participation ==
According to an unofficial count, 34 athletes from 26 countries participated in the event.

- Algeria (1)
- Australia (2)
- Belarus (2)
- Brazil (2)
- Canada (1)
- Chile (1)
- Croatia (1)
- Cuba (1)
- Czech Republic (1)
- Finland (2)
- Germany (1)
- Hungary (2)
- Israel (1)
- Japan (2)
- Peru (1)
- Poland (1)
- Puerto Rico (1)
- Russia (1)
- Somalia (1)
- South Africa (1)
- South Korea (1)
- Sweden (1)
- Ukraine (1)
- United Kingdom (2)
- United States (2)
- Yugoslavia (1)
