= 2001 World Championships in Athletics – Men's high jump =

These are the results of the Men's High Jump event at the 2001 World Championships in Athletics in Edmonton, Alberta, Canada.

== Medalists ==
Gold	Martin Buß; Germany (GER)
Silver	Vyacheslav Voronin; Russia (RUS)
Silver	Yaroslav Rybakov; Russia (RUS)

== Schedule ==
- All times are Mountain Standard Time (UTC-7)

Qualification Round
Group A	Group B
05.08.2001 – 10:17	05.08.2001 – 10:17
Final Round
08.08.2001 – 18:40

== Results ==
=== Qualification ===
5 August

Qualification standard: 2.29 m or at least 12 best.

Rank	Group	Name	2.15	2.20	2.25	2.27	Result	Notes
1	A	Charles Austin (USA)	–	o	–	o	2.27	q
2	B	Stefan Holm (SWE)	–	o	xxo	o	2.27	q
2	B	Vyacheslav Voronin (RUS)	o	o	xxo	o	2.27	q
2	A	Staffan Strand (SWE)	–	o	xxo	o	2.27	q
5	A	Mark Boswell (CAN)	–	o	–	xo	2.27	q
5	A	Yaroslav Rybakov (RUS)	o	o	o	xo	2.27	q
7	A	Martin Buß (GER)	–	o	xo	xo	2.27	q
8	B	Abderahmane Hammad (ALG)	o	xo	o	xo	2.27	q
9	B	Kwaku Boateng (CAN)	–	xo	xo	xo	2.27	q
10	A	Sergey Klyugin (RUS)	o	o	o	xxx	2.25	q
11	B	Gilmar Mayo (COL)	o	xo	o	xxx	2.25	q
12	B	Nathan Leeper (USA)	o	xo	xo	xxx	2.25	
13	A	Jan Janků (CZE)	–	o	xo	xxx	2.25	
14	A	Serhiy Dymchenko (UKR)	xxo	xo	xxo	xxx	2.25	
15	A	Mika Polku (FIN)	o	o	xxx		2.20	
15	A	David Furman (USA)	o	o	xxx		2.20	
17	B	Ben Challenger (GBR)	o	xo	xxx		2.20	
17	B	Aleksandr Kravtsov (RUS)	o	xo	xxx		2.20	
19	B	Einar Karl Hjartarson (ISL)	xo	xo	xxx		2.20	
20	A	Elvir Krehmić (BIH)	–	xxo	xxx		2.20	
21	B	Andriy Sokolovskyy (UKR)	o	xxx			2.15	
21	A	Grzegorz Sposób (POL)	o	xxx			2.15	
23	A	Jacques Freitag (RSA)	xxo	xxx			2.15	
	B	Eugene Ernesta (SEY)	xxx				NM	
	B	Javier Sotomayor (CUB)					DQ	q*

Note: Javier Sotomayor had originally qualified for the final with 2.27 m but was later disqualified for doping.

=== Final ===
8 August

Rank	Name	2.20	2.25	2.30	2.33	2.36	Result	Notes
Gold medal	Martin Buß (GER)	o	o	o	x-	xo	2.36	WL
Silver medal	Vyacheslav Voronin (RUS)	-	o	o	o	xxx	2.33	SB
Silver medal	Yaroslav Rybakov (RUS)	o	o	o	o	xxx	2.33	PB
4	Sergey Klyugin (RUS)	o	-	xo	xxx		2.30	
4	Stefan Holm (SWE)	o	o	xo	x-	xx	2.30	
6	Staffan Strand (SWE)	-	o	xx-	x		2.25	
6	Mark Boswell (CAN)	o	o	-	xxx		2.25	
8	Kwaku Boateng (CAN)	o	xxo	x-	xx		2.25	
9	Charles Austin (USA)	o	-	xxx			2.20	
9	Abderahmane Hammad (ALG)	o	xxx				2.20	
11	Gilmar Mayo (COL)	xxo	xxx				2.20	
	Javier Sotomayor (CUB)						DQ	*

Note: Javier Sotomayor had originally finished in the 4th place with 2.33 m but was later disqualified for doping.
