= 2000 European Athletics Indoor Championships – Men's high jump =

The men's high jump event at the 2000 European Athletics Indoor Championships was held on February 26–27.

== Medalists ==
Gold	Silver	Bronze
Vyacheslav Voronin; Russia	Martin Buß; Germany	Dragutin Topić; Yugoslavia

== Results ==
=== Qualification ===
Qualification: Qualification Performance 2.25 (Q) or at least 8 best performers advanced to the final.

Rank	Athlete	Nationality	2.06	2.11	2.16	2.21	2.26	Result	Notes
1	Brendan Reilly	Ireland						2.25	Q
1	Dragutin Topić	Yugoslavia						2.25	Q
3	Martin Buß	Germany						2.25	Q
4	Pyotr Brayko	Russia						2.25	Q
5	Stefan Holm	Sweden						2.25	Q
5	Vyacheslav Voronin	Russia						2.25	Q
7	Oskari Frösén	Finland	–	o	xo	o	xxx	2.21	q
8	Didier Detchénique	France	–	o	o	xo	xxx	2.21	q
8	Elvir Krehmić	Bosnia and Herzegovina	–	o	–	xo	xxx	2.21	q
8	Christian Rhoden	Germany	–	–	o	xo	xxx	2.21	q
11	Toni Huikuri	Finland	o	o	xo	xo	xxx	2.21	
11	Wolfgang Kreißig	Germany	–	–	xo	xo	xxx	2.21	
13	Metin Durmuşoğlu	Turkey	–	–	xo	xxo	xxx	2.21	
14	Ivan Bernasconi	Italy						2.16	
14	Ben Challenger	Great Britain						2.16	
14	Martin Stauffer	Switzerland						2.16	
17	Marko Aleksejev	Estonia						2.16	
17	Jan Janků	Czech Republic						2.16	
17	Aleksey Krysin	Russia						2.16	
20	Wilbert Pennings	Netherlands						2.11	
21	Einar Karl Hjartarson	Iceland						2.11	
22	Frederic Schinz	Switzerland						2.11	

=== Final ===
Rank	Athlete	Nationality	2.15	2.20	2.24	2.27	2.30	2.32	2.34	2.36	Result	Notes
1st place, gold medalist(s)	Vyacheslav Voronin	Russia	–	–	o	–	o	–	o	xxx	2.34	
2nd place, silver medalist(s)	Martin Buß	Germany	–	o	–	o	o	o	xo	xxx	2.34	PB
3rd place, bronze medalist(s)	Dragutin Topić	Yugoslavia	–	o	–	o	x–	o	xo	xxx	2.34	SB
4	Stefan Holm	Sweden	–	o	o	o	o	o	xx–	x	2.32	PB
5	Pyotr Brayko	Russia	–	o	xxo	xxo	–	x–	xx		2.27	
6	Oskari Frösén	Finland	o	–	xo	xxx					2.24	
7	Elvir Krehmić	Bosnia and Herzegovina	o	o	xxx						2.20	
7	Christian Rhoden	Germany	o	o	xxx						2.20	
9	Didier Detchénique	France	o	xxx							2.15	
	Brendan Reilly	Ireland	–	–	–	xxx					NM	
