= 2001 IAAF World Indoor Championships – Men's high jump =

The men's high jump event at the 2001 IAAF World Indoor Championships was held on March 11.

== Results ==
Rank	Athlete	Nationality	2.20	2.25	2.29	2.32	2.36	Result	Notes
1st place, gold medalist(s)	Stefan Holm	Sweden	o	xo	o	xo	xxx	2.32	
2nd place, silver medalist(s)	Andriy Sokolovskiy	Ukraine	o	o	o	xxx		2.29	
3rd place, bronze medalist(s)	Staffan Strand	Sweden	–	o	xo	xxx		2.29	
4	Nathan Leeper	United States	xxo	–	xo	xxx		2.29	
5	Javier Sotomayor	Cuba	–	o	–	xxx		2.25	
6	Martin Buß	Germany	o	o	xxx			2.25	
7	Yaroslav Rybakov	Russia	o	xo	xxx			2.25	
8	Serhiy Dymchenko	Ukraine	xxo	xo	xxx			2.25	
9	Vyacheslav Voronin	Russia	o	xxo	xxx			2.25	
10	Andrei Chubsa	Belarus	o	xxx				2.20	
11	Charles Austin	United States	xo	–	xxx			2.20	
12	Mark Boswell	Canada	xxo	–	xx–	x		2.20	
12	Kwaku Boateng	Canada	xxo	–	xx–	x		2.20	
	Konstantin Matusevich	Israel	xxx					NM	
