= 1999 IAAF World Indoor Championships – Men's high jump =

The men's high jump event at the 1999 IAAF World Indoor Championships was held on March 7.

== Results ==
Rank	Athlete	Nationality	2.20	2.25	2.30	2.33	2.36	2.38	2.40	Result	Notes
1st place, gold medalist(s)	Javier Sotomayor	Cuba	o	–	o	o	o	–	x	2.36	WL
2nd place, silver medalist(s)	Vyacheslav Voronin	Russia	o	o	o	xxo	o	xxx		2.36	WL
3rd place, bronze medalist(s)	Charles Austin	United States	o	–	o	xo	x–	xx		2.33	SB
4	Martin Buß	Germany	o	o	o	xxx				2.30	PB
5	Staffan Strand	Sweden	o	o	x–	xx				2.25	
6	Stefan Holm	Sweden	o	xo	x–	xx				2.25	
6	Tomáš Janků	Czech Republic	o	xo	xxx					2.25	
6	Andriy Sokolovskyy	Ukraine	o	xo	xxx					2.25	
9	Elvir Krehmić	Bosnia and Herzegovina	xo	xxo	xxx					2.25	
	Steve Smith	Great Britain	–	xxx						NM	
	Shigeki Toyoshima	Japan	xxx							NM	
