= Elvir Krehmić =

Bosnian high jumper

Personal information
- Nationality: Bosnian
- Born: 27 April 1973 (age 53) Zenica, SR Bosnia and Herzegovina, SFR Yugoslavia

Sport
- Country: Bosnia and Herzegovina
- Sport: Athletics
- Event: High jump

Achievements and titles
- Personal bests: Outdoor: 2.31 NR (1998); Indoor: 2.29 NR (1999)

Elvir Krehmić (born 27 April 1973) is a retired Bosnian athlete specializing in the high jump. He competed at the 2000 Olympic Games in Sydney, narrowly missing the final round. He is currently the national team coach for the Athletic Federation of Bosnia and Herzegovina.

His personal best in the event is 2.31 metres outdoors, achieved in 1998, and 2.29 metres indoors from 1999. Both results are standing Bosnia and Herzegovina records. Krehmić was coached by Munir Selimović.

== Competition record ==
Year	Competition	Venue	Position	Notes
Representing Bosnia and Herzegovina
1997	World Indoor Championships	Paris, France	31st (q)	2.10 m
1997	Mediterranean Games	Bari, Italy	8th	2.15 m
1997	World Championships	Athens, Greece	26th (q)	2.23 m
1998	European Indoor Championships	Valencia, Spain	6th	2.22 m
1998	European Championships	Budapest, Hungary	13th (q)	2.20 m
1999	World Indoor Championships	Maebashi, Japan	9th	2.25 m
1999	World Championships	Seville, Spain	22nd (q)	2.20 m
2000	European Indoor Championships	Ghent, Belgium	7th	2.20 m
2000	Olympic Games	Sydney, Australia	14th (q)	2.24 m
2001	Mediterranean Games	Radès, Tunisia	3rd	2.19 m
2001	World Championships	Edmonton, Canada	20th (q)	2.20 m
2002	European Indoor Championships	Vienna, Austria	22nd (q)	2.17 m

^{Note: This table only includes major athletics championships and does not include Diamond League or IAAF World Challenge meets.}

Olympic Games
Preceded by Islam Đugum	Flagbearer for Bosnia and Herzegovina; Sydney 2000	Succeeded by Nedžad Fazlija
