= Grzegorz Sposób =

Polish high jumper

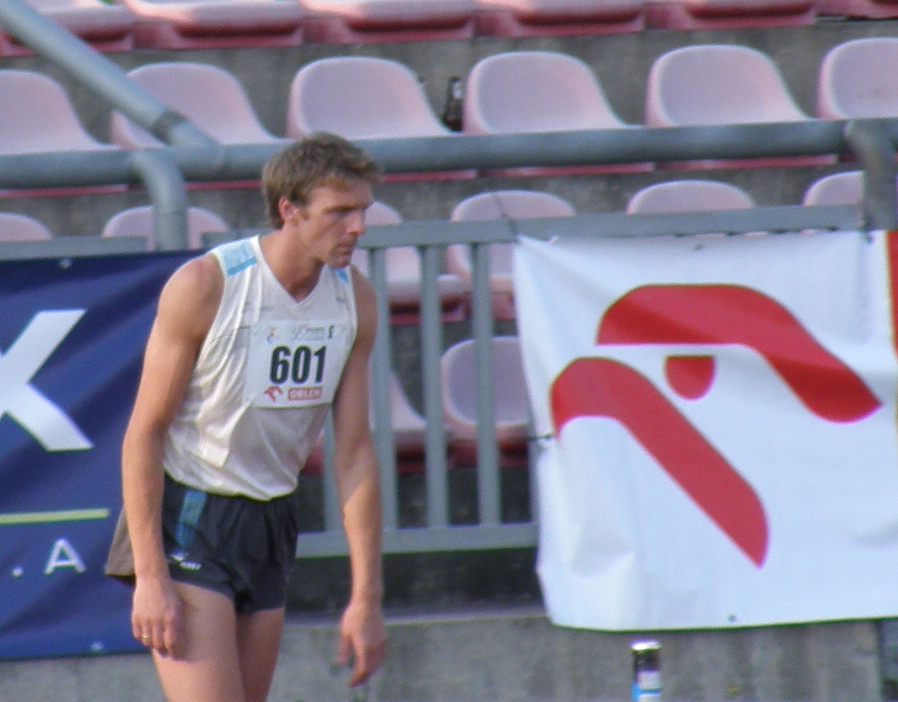
Sposób at the 2010 Janusz Kusociński Memorial

Grzegorz Sposób (born 12 February 1976 in Świdnik) is a Polish high jumper. He finished sixth at the 2003 World Championships in Paris with a jump of 2.29 metres. The next year he competed in the 2004 Olympics, but failed to qualify from his pool.

His personal best jump is 2.34 metres, achieved in June 2004 in Bydgoszcz.

== Competition record ==
Year	Competition	Venue	Position	Notes
Representing Poland
2001	World Championships	Edmonton, Canada	21st (q)	2.15 m
2001	Universiade	Beijing, China	4th	2.26 m
2002	European Indoor Championships	Vienna, Austria	12th (q)	2.22 m
2002	European Championships	Munich, Germany	14th (q)	2.15 m
2003	World Championships	Paris, France	6th	2.29 m
2004	Olympic Games	Athens, Greece	20th (q)	2.20 m
2005	World Championships	Helsinki, Finland	18th (q)	2.20 m
2007	European Indoor Championships	Birmingham, United Kingdom	19th (q)	2.18 m
2009	World Championships	Berlin, Germany	26th (q)	2.20 m
