= Konstantin Matusevich =

Israeli high jumper

Konstantin Matusevich (Hebrew: קונסטנטין מטוסביץ, Russian: Константин Матусевич; born 25 January 1971 in Kiev, in the Ukrainian SSR of the Soviet Union) is a retired Ukrainian-born Israeli high jumper. His personal best jump is 2.36 metres, achieved in February 2000, in Perth. This is the current Israeli record.

== Achievements ==
Year	Competition	Venue	Position	Notes
Representing Israel
1995	World Championships	Gothenburg, Sweden	21st (q)	2.24 m
1996	European Indoor Championships	Stockholm, Sweden	4th	2.31 m
1996	Olympic Games	Atlanta, United States	17th (q)	2.26 m
1997	World Indoor Championships	Paris, France	20th (q)	2.20 m
1997	World Championships	Athens, Greece	7th	2.29 m
1998	European Championships	Budapest, Hungary	–	NM
1999	World Championships	Seville, Spain	20th (q)	2.20 m
2000	Olympic Games	Sydney, Australia	5th	2.32 m
2001	World Indoor Championships	Lisbon, Portugal	–	NM
2002	European Championships	Munich, Germany	–	NM

== See also ==
- List of Israeli records in athletics
- List of Maccabiah records in athletics
