= Henadz Maroz =

Belarusian high jumper

Personal information
- Born: August 15, 1978 (age 48) Gomel, Soviet Union

Sport
- Sport: Track and field
Medal record
Representing Belarus
World Indoor Championships
Bronze medal – third place	2003 Birmingham	High jump
Summer Universiade
Silver medal – second place	2001 Beijing	High jump
Silver medal – second place	2005 Izmir	High jump

Henadz Maroz (Belarusian: Гена́дзь Ві́ктаравіч Маро́з, tr. Henadz Viktaravich Maroz; Łacinka: Hienadź Viktaravič Maroz; Russian: Генна́дий Ви́кторович Моро́з, tr. Gennadiy Viktorovich Moroz; born August 15, 1978) is a retired Belarusian high jumper.

In 2003 he equalled his indoor personal best of 2.30 metres to win the bronze medal at the World Indoor Championships. His outdoor personal best of 2.33 metres was set in July 2001 in Brest.

Maroz won silver medals at the Summer Universiade in 2001 and 2005. He has competed in other major competitions like the 2004 Summer Olympics and the 2005 World Championships without success.

== Competition record ==
Year	Competition	Venue	Position	Notes
Representing Belarus
1997	European Junior Championships	Ljubljana, Slovenia	1st	2.20 m
1998	European Championships	Budapest, Hungary	18th (q)	2.15 m
1999	European U23 Championships	Gothenburg, Sweden	5th	2.18 m
2001	Universiade	Beijing, China	2nd	2.28 m
2002	European Indoor Championships	Vienna, Austria	7th	2.24 m
2002	European Championships	Munich, Germany	15th (q)	2.15 m
2003	World Indoor Championships	Birmingham, United Kingdom	3rd	2.30 m
2003	World Championships	Paris, France	14th (q)	2.27 m
2004	World Indoor Championships	Budapest, Hungary	6th	2.25 m
2004	Olympic Games	Athens, Greece	13th (q)	2.25 m
2005	World Championships	Helsinki, Finland	27th (q)	2.15 m
2005	Universiade	İzmir, Turkey	2nd	2.26 m
