= 1998 European Athletics Championships – Men's high jump =

Men's high jump at the European Athletics Championships

The men's high jump at the 1998 European Athletics Championships was held at the Népstadion on 19 and 21 August.

== Medalists ==
Gold	Artur Partyka; Poland
Silver	Dalton Grant; Great Britain
Bronze	Sergey Klyugin; Russia

== Results ==
KEY:	q	Better non-qualifiers	Q	Qualified	NR	National record	PB	Personal best	SB	Seasonal best

=== Qualification ===
Qualification: Qualification Performance 2.26 (Q) or at least 12 best performers advance to the final.

Rank	Group	Athlete	Nationality	2.10	2.15	2.20	2.24	Result	Notes
1	A	Artur Partyka	Poland	–	o	–	o	2.24	q
1	A	Martin Buß	Germany	–	o	o	o	2.24	q
1	A	Staffan Strand	Sweden					2.24	q
1	A	Tomáš Janků	Czech Republic					2.24	q
1	A	Dragutin Topić	Yugoslavia					2.24	q
1	A	Dimitrios Kokotis	Greece					2.24	q
1	B	Steinar Hoen	Norway					2.24	q
1	B	Stefan Holm	Sweden					2.24	q
1	B	Sergey Klyugin	Russia					2.24	q
1	B	Christian Rhoden	Germany	–	o	xo	xo	2.24	q
1	B	Brendan Reilly	Great Britain	–	–	o	xxo	2.24	q
12	A	Dalton Grant	Great Britain	xo	xxo	xxo	xxo	2.24	q
13	A	Elvir Krehmić	Bosnia and Herzegovina	–	o	o	xxx	2.20	
13	A	Ramon Kaju	Estonia	–	xo	xo	xxx	2.20	
13	A	Aleksey Krysin	Russia	–	o	xxo	xxx	2.20	
13	A	Wilbert Pennings	Netherlands					2.20	
13	B	Oskari Frösén	Finland					2.20	
18	A	Itay Margalit	Israel					2.15	
18	B	Hennazdy Maroz	Belarus					2.15	
18	B	Konstantinos Liapis	Greece					2.15	
18	B	Ignacio Pérez	Spain					2.15	
22	B	Işık Bayraktar	Turkey					2.10	
	B	Konstantin Matusevich	Israel					NM	
	B	Jan Janků	Czech Republic					NM	

=== Final ===
Rank	Athlete	Nationality	2.15	2.20	2.24	2.27	2.30	2.32	2.34	2.36	2.38	Result	Notes
1st place, gold medalist(s)	Artur Partyka	Poland	o	–	o	–	o	–	o	xxx		2.34	
2nd place, silver medalist(s)	Dalton Grant	Great Britain	xo	o	–	x–	xo	x–	xo	–	xxx	2.34	
3rd place, bronze medalist(s)	Sergey Klyugin	Russia	–	o	o	o	o	o	xx–	x		2.32	
4	Martin Buß	Germany	–	o	o	o	o	xo	xxx			2.32	
5	Dimitrios Kokotis	Greece	–	o	–	o	o	xxx				2.30	
6	Steinar Hoen	Norway	–	xo	xo	o	xxo	x–	xx			2.30	
7	Stefan Holm	Sweden	–	o	xo	o	x–	xx				2.27	
8	Staffan Strand	Sweden	–	o	–	xxo	xx–	x				2.27	
9	Dragutin Topić	Yugoslavia	–	o	o	–	–	xxx				2.24	
9	Brendan Reilly	Great Britain	–	–	o	xx–	x					2.24	
11	Christian Rhoden	Germany	o	xo	o	xxx						2.24	
12	Tomáš Janků	Czech Republic	o	o	xo	xxx						2.24	
