= Brendan Reilly (athlete) =

British and Irish high jumper (born 1972)

Brendan Reilly OLY
Personal information
- Nationality: British/ Irish
- Born: 23 December 1972 (age 53) Shipley, England
- Height: 1.96 m (6 ft 5 in)
- Weight: 82 kg (181 lb)
- Spouse: Sarah Reilly (m. 2000)

Sport
- Country: Great Britain (England); Ireland
- Sport: Track and field
- Event: High jump
- Club: Belgrave Harriers; Corby AC
Medal record
Representing Great Britain
Summer Universiade
| Bronze medal – third place | 1995 Fukuoka | High jump |

Brendan Anthony John Reilly (born 23 December 1972) is a retired two-time Olympic high jumper.

== Athletics career ==
Reilly won medals at the 1992 IAAF World Cup in Cuba and bronze at the 1995 Summer Universiade. He was a five-times English Schools Champion, a former world record holder for 15 year olds (2.12 m) and a European and World Schools champion. He broke the British junior record at 17 with 2m 27 cm in May 1990. First British teenager to jump over 2.30 m and a personal best of 2.32 m.

He represented England in the high jump event, at the 1994 Commonwealth Games in Victoria, Canada. Four years later he represented England in the high jump again, at the 1998 Commonwealth Games in Kuala Lumpur, Malaysia. He finished his career competing for Ireland.

Reilly was a four-times British high jump champion after winning the British AAA Championships title at the 1994 AAA Championships and the 1997 AAA Championships in addition to winning the 1992 and 1997 UK Athletics Championships.

His personal bests in the event are 2.31 metres outdoors (1992) and 2.32 metres indoors (2000).

== Personal life ==
Reilly is married to Irish Olympic sprinter Sarah Reilly.

He is also an artist with work on display for the Art of the Olympians (AOTO).

Brendan is also an accomplished golfer having represented Corby GC and is former holder of the Pam St Clement Trophy.

== Competition record ==
| Year | Competition | Venue | Position | Notes |
Representing Great Britain and England
| 1989 | European Junior Championships | Varaždin, Yugoslavia | 16th | 2.11 m |
| 1990 | World Junior Championships | Plovdiv, Bulgaria | 15th (q) | 2.10 m |
| 1990 | European Championships | Split, Yugoslavia | 19th (q) | 2.20 m |
| 1991 | European Junior Championships | Thessaloniki, Greece | 5th | 2.23 m |
| 1992 | European Indoor Championships | Genoa, Italy | 10th | 2.20 m |
| 1992 | Olympic Games | Barcelona, Spain | 16th (q) | 2.23 m |
| 1992 | World Cup | Havana, Cuba | 3rd | 2.26 m |
| 1993 | Universiade | Buffalo, United States | 7th | 2.24 m |
| 1993 | World Championships | Stuttgart, Germany | 21st (q) | 2.20 m |
| 1994 | European Indoor Championships | Paris, France | 7th | 2.26 m |
| 1994 | European Championships | Helsinki, Finland | 16th (q) | 2.20 m |
| 1994 | Commonwealth Games | Victoria, Canada | 7th | 2.25 m |
| 1995 | World Indoor Championships | Barcelona, Spain | 14th (q) | 2.20 m |
| 1995 | World Championships | Gothenburg, Sweden | 18th (q) | 2.24 m |
| 1995 | Universiade | Fukuoka, Japan | 3rd | 2.27 m |
| 1997 | World Championships | Athens, Greece | 27th (q) | 2.23 m |
| 1998 | European Championships | Budapest, Hungary | 9th | 2.24 m |
| 1998 | Commonwealth Games | Kuala Lumpur, Malaysia | 5th | 2.24 m |
Representing Ireland
| 1999 | World Championships | Seville, Spain | 8th | 2.29 m |
| 2000 | European Indoor Championships | Ghent, Belgium | 1st (q) | 2.25 m No mark in the final. |
| 2000 | Olympic Games | Sydney, Australia | 23rd (q) | 2.20 m |

== See also ==
- List of eligibility transfers in athletics
