= Staffan Strand =

Swedish high jumper

Personal information
- Born: 18 April 1976 (age 50) Upplands Väsby, Sweden
Medal record
Men's Athletics
Representing Sweden
World Indoor Championships
Bronze medal – third place	2001 Lisbon	High jump
European Championships
Bronze medal – third place	2002 Munich	High jump
European Indoor Championships
Gold medal – first place	2002 Vienna	High jump
European U23 Championships
Gold medal – first place	1997 Turku	High Jump

Staffan Bo Strand (born 18 April 1976) is a Swedish former high jumper. He currently lives in Norrmalm in Stockholm with his wife since 2004 Tiffany.

== Career ==
His personal best jump is 2.32 metres, achieved in July 2000 in Nice and in September 2000 at the Olympic Games in Sydney. He has an indoor personal best of 2.35 metres, achieved in June 2002 in Stockholm.

Staffan was a 6-time Big Ten champion and 5-time All-American in his three years of competition for the University of Minnesota. He graduated with a Bachelor of Science in computer engineering with High Distinction and a Master of Science in computer engineering. Upon completing the master's degree, he started work on a PhD doing advanced research in Storage and Data Management.

In July 2008, Staffan Strand decided to retire from elite sports because his ankle could not cope with the hard training.

In May 2026, he became a CEO of Eficode.

== Achievements ==
Year	Competition	Venue	Position	Notes
Representing Sweden
1995	European Junior Championships	Nyíregyháza, Hungary	5th	2.17 m
1996	European Indoor Championships	Stockholm, Sweden	9th	2.20 m
1997	European U23 Championships	Turku, Finland	1st	2.28 m
1997	World Championships	Athens, Greece	15th (q)	2.23 m
1998	European Championships	Budapest, Hungary	8th	2.27 m
1999	World Indoor Championships	Maebashi, Japan	5th	2.25 m
1999	Universiade	Palma de Mallorca, Spain	–	NM
1999	World Championships	Seville, Spain	5th	2.29 m
2000	Olympic Games	Sydney, Australia	6th	2.32 m
2001	World Indoor Championships	Lisbon, Portugal	3rd	2.29 m
2001	World Championships	Edmonton, Canada	6th	2.25 m
2002	European Indoor Championships	Vienna, Austria	1st	2.34 m
2002	European Championships	Munich, Germany	3rd	2.27 m
2003	World Indoor Championships	Birmingham, United Kingdom	7th	2.25 m
2003	World Championships	Paris, France	22nd (q)	2.20 m
2004	Olympic Games	Athens, Greece	18th (q)	2.25 m

== Progression ==
Year	Height
1984	1.10m
1985	1.25m (1.26m i)
1986	1.33m (1.35m i)
1987	1.40m (1.45m i)
1988	1.52m (1.60m i)
1989	1.63m (1.65m i)
1990	1.71m
1991	1.71m
1992	1.80m
1993	1.88m (1.91m i)
1994	2.11m
1995	2.22m
1996	2.27m
1997	2.28m
1998	2.31m
1999	2.30m
2000	2.32m
2001	2.31m (2.34m i)
2002	2.30m (2.35m i)
2003	2.26m (2.32m i)
2004	2.30m
2005	Injured (stress fracture ankle)
2006	2.25m
2007	2.15m
