= Ruslan Hlivinskiy =

Ukrainian high jumper

Personal information
- Nationality: Ukrainian
- Born: 7 February 1975 (age 50)

Sport
- Sport: Athletics
- Event: High jump

Ruslan Hlivinskiy (born 7 February 1975) is a Ukrainian athlete. He competed in the men's high jump at the 2000 Summer Olympics.
