= Athletics at the 1999 Pan American Games – Men's high jump =

Men's high jump at the Pan American Games

The men's high jump event at the 1999 Pan American Games was held on July 30. Javier Sotomayor of Cuba had originally won the competition with a 2.30 metres jump but later tested positive for an illegal substance, cocaine, and was stripped of his medal.

== Results ==
Rank	Name	Nationality	2.00	2.05	2.10	2.15	2.20	2.25	2.30	Result	Notes
~~1~~	Javier Sotomayor	Cuba								~~2.30~~	DQ
1st place, gold medalist(s)	Kwaku Boateng	Canada	–	–	–	o	–	o	xxx	2.25	
1st place, gold medalist(s)	Mark Boswell	Canada	–	–	–	o	–	o	xxx	2.25	
3rd place, bronze medalist(s)	Charles Clinger	United States	–	–	–	xo	xxo	xxo	xxx	2.25	
4	Fabrício Romero	Brazil	–	o	o	o	xxo	xxx		2.20	
4	Gilmar Mayo	Colombia	–	–	–	o	xxo	xxx		2.20	
6	Erasmo Jara	Argentina	–	o	xxo	o	xxx			2.15	
7	Alfredo Deza	Peru	–	o	o	xo	xxx			2.15	
7	Henry Patterson	United States	–	–	–	xo	xxx			2.15	
9	Julio Luciano	Dominican Republic	–	–	o	xxo	xxx			2.15	
10	Paul Caraballo	Grenada	–	–	o	xxx				2.10	
11	Felipe Apablaza	Chile	–	xo	xo	xxx				2.10	
12	Jackson Quiñónez	Ecuador	xo	xxx						2.00	
	Troy Kemp	Bahamas								DNS	
