= Kwaku Boateng (high jumper) =

Canadian high jumper (born 1974)

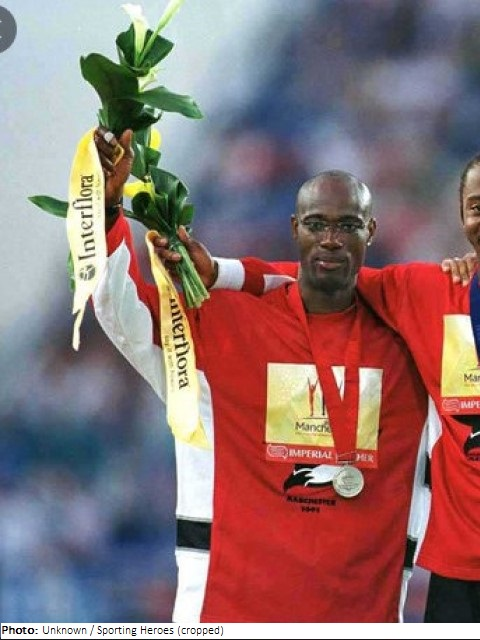
- Boateng in 2002

Personal information
- Born: 30 June 1974 (age 52) Eastmont, Ghana
- Home town: Montreal, Canada

Sport
- Sport: Athletics
- Event: High jump
Medal record
Representing Canada
Commonwealth Games
Silver medal – second place	2002 Manchester	High jump
Pan American Games
Gold medal – first place	1999 Winnipeg	High jump

Kwaku Boateng (born 30 June 1974) is a Canadian high jumper. His personal best jump is 2.34 metres, achieved in July 2000 in Zagreb. Boateng competed representing Ghana from 1993 to 1996. From January 1997 he has competed for Canada. His hometown is Montreal, Quebec. Boateng is father to Canadian high jumper Tristan Boateng.

== International competitions ==
Year	Competition	Venue	Position	Notes
Representing Ghana
1994	Commonwealth Games	Victoria, Canada	20th (q)	2.05 m
Representing Canada
1997	World Indoor Championships	Paris, France	18th (q)	2.20 m
1999	Pan American Games	Winnipeg, Canada	1st	2.25 m
1999	World Championships	Seville, Spain	6th	2.29 m
2000	Olympic Games	Sydney, Australia	12th	2.25 m
2001	World Indoor Championships	Lisbon, Portugal	12th	2.20 m
2001	Jeux de la Francophonie	Ottawa, Canada	2nd	2.31 m
2001	World Championships	Edmonton, Canada	8th	2.25 m
2002	Commonwealth Games	Manchester, United Kingdom	2nd	2.25 m
2005	Jeux de la Francophonie	Niamey, Niger	2nd	2.20 m
