= Aleksey Lelin =

Belarusian high jumper (1977–2026)

Personal information
- Nationality: Belarusian
- Born: 27 November 1977
- Died: 19 April 2026 (aged 48)

Sport
- Sport: Athletics
- Event: High jump

Aleksey Lelin (Russian: Алексей Лелин, Belarusian: Аляксей Лелін; 27 November 1977 — 19 April 2026) was a Belarusian athlete. He competed in the men's high jump at the 2000 Summer Olympics.

Lelin contested his first national championship final in 1998, finishing 5th at the Belarusian Indoor Athletics Championships in the high jump. He won his first Belarusian Athletics Championships title in 2000, where he jumped 2.28 m. Later that year, he also won a gold medal at the 2000 European Cup Second League in the high jump.

At the 2000 Sydney Olympics, Lelin cleared 2.15 metres but failed all his attempts at 2.30 m, failing to qualify for the finals. He continued to compete internationally until 2002.

He became a coach, leading Belarusian youth athletics teams in 2022.

Lelin died on 19 April 2026, at the age of 48. On 21 April 2026, a farewell ceremony for Alexei Lelin was held at the funeral home (Minsk, Kulman Street, 33a).
