= Pyotr Brayko =

Russian high jumper

Personal information
- Born: 27 March 1977 (age 49) Leningrad, Soviet Union
- Height: 2.03 m (6 ft 8 in)
- Weight: 90 kg (200 lb)

Sport
- Sport: Track and field
- Event: High jump
- Club: Dynamo St. Petersburg

Pyotr Aleksandrovich Brayko (Cyrillic: Пётр Александрович Брайко; born 27 March 1977 in Leningrad, Soviet Union) is a retired Russian athlete who specialised in the high jump. He represented his country at two consecutive Summer Olympics, in 2000 and 2004, failing to qualify for the final at both occasions.

He has personal bests of 2.30 metres outdoors and 2.31 metres indoors, both set in 2002.

== Competition record ==
Year	Competition	Venue	Position	Notes
Representing Russia
1995	European Junior Championships	Nyíregyháza, Hungary	8th	2.14 m
2000	European Indoor Championships	Ghent, Belgium	5th	2.27 m
2000	Olympic Games	Sydney, Australia	27th (q)	2.15 m
2002	European Indoor Championships	Vienna, Austria	14th (q)	2.22 m
2003	World Championships	Paris, France	22nd (q)	2.20 m
2004	Olympic Games	Athens, Greece	25th (q)	2.20 m
