= Tomáš Janků =

Czech high jumper

Personal information
- Born: 27 December 1974 (age 51) Jablonec nad Nisou, Czechoslovakia

Sport
- Sport: Track and field
Medal record
Representing Czech Republic
European Championships
Silver medal – second place	2006 Gothenburg	High jump
European Indoor Championships
Bronze medal – third place	1998 Valencia	High jump

Tomáš Janků (Czech pronunciation: [ˈtomaːʃ ˈjaŋkuː]; born 27 December 1974) is a former Czech high jumper.

His personal best jump is 2.34 metres, achieved at the 2006 European Championships in Gothenburg. In 2010, he married Czech pole vaulter Kateřina Baďurová. His older brother Jan Janků was also a prominent high jumper.

== Achievements ==
Year	Competition	Venue	Position	Notes
Representing Czechoslovakia
1992	World Junior Championships	Seoul, South Korea	7th	2.17 m
Representing the Czech Republic
1993	European Junior Championships	San Sebastián, Spain	3rd	2.18 m
1996	Olympic Games	Atlanta, United States	14th	2.25 m
1997	World Championships	Athens, Greece	28th (q)	2.19 m
1997	Universiade	Catania, Italy	4th	2.26 m
1998	European Indoor Championships	Valencia, Spain	3rd	2.29 m
1998	European Championships	Budapest, Hungary	12th	2.24 m
1999	World Indoor Championships	Maebashi, Japan	6th	2.25 m
1999	Universiade	Palma de Mallorca, Spain	–	NM
2002	European Indoor Championships	Vienna, Austria	6th	2.24 m
2002	European Championships	Munich, Germany	5th	2.25 m
2003	World Indoor Championships	Birmingham, United Kingdom	6th	2.25 m
2003	World Championships	Paris, France	16th (q)	2.25 m
2004	World Indoor Championships	Budapest, Hungary	16th (q)	2.20 m
2004	Olympic Games	Athens, Greece	15th (q)	2.20 m
2005	European Indoor Championships	Madrid, Spain	16th (q)	2.23 m
2006	World Indoor Championships	Moscow, Russia	13th (q)	2.24 m
2006	European Championships	Gothenburg, Sweden	2nd	2.34 m
2006	World Athletics Final	Stuttgart, Germany	7th	2.24 m
2006	World Cup	Athens, Greece	1st	2.28 m
2007	European Indoor Championships	Birmingham, United Kingdom	4th	2.25 m
2007	World Championships	Osaka, Japan	5th	2.30 m
2008	Olympic Games	Beijing, China	7th	2.29 m
