= Didier Detchénique =

French high jumper

Personal information
- Born: 4 October 1972 (age 54) Le Raincy, France

Sport
- Sport: Track and field
Medal record
Representing France
Summer Universiade
Bronze medal – third place	1997 Catania	High jump

Didier Detchénique (born 4 October 1972) is a retired French high jumper.

He finished twelfth, at the 1997 World Indoor Championships, won the bronze medal at the 1997 Summer Universiade, and finished ninth at the 2000 European Indoor Championships He also competed at the 1997 World Championships and the 1998 European Indoor Championships

Detchénique became French champion in 1996, 1997 and 1998 and French indoor champion in 1995, 1997, 1998 and 2000. His personal best was 2.31 metres, achieved in June 1997 in Saint-Denis.
