= Lee Jin-taek =

South Korean high jumper

Personal information
- Born: 13 April 1972 (age 54) Kyungbuk, South Korea
Medal record
Men's Athletics
Representing South Korea
Summer Universiade
Gold medal – first place	1997 Catania	High Jump
Bronze medal – third place	1999 Palma de Mallorca	High Jump
Asian Athletics Championships
Gold medal – first place	1991 Kuala Lumpur	High Jump
Gold medal – first place	1993 Manila	High Jump
Gold medal – first place	1995 Djakarta	High Jump
Silver medal – second place	1998 Fukuokaa	High Jump
Asian Games
Gold medal – first place	1998 Bangkok	High Jump
Gold medal – first place	2002 Busan	High Jump

Lee Jin-taek (born 13 April 1972) is a retired South Korean high jumper.

== Career ==
His personal best jump is 2.34 metres, achieved in June 1997 in Seoul. This was the South Korean record.

== Achievements ==
Year	Competition	Venue	Position	Notes
Representing South Korea
1990	Asian Junior Championships	Beijing, China	1st	2.20 m
1991	Asian Championships	Kuala Lumpur, Malaysia	1st	2.22 m
1992	Olympic Games	Barcelona, Spain	19th (q)	2.20 m
1993	World Indoor Championships	Toronto, Canada	17th (q)	2.20 m
1993	East Asian Games	Shanghai, China	2nd	2.26 m
1993	Universiade	Buffalo, United States	5th	2.24 m
1993	World Championships	Stuttgart, Germany	20th (q)	2.20 m
1993	Asian Championships	Manila, Philippines	1st	2.24 m
1994	Asian Games	Hiroshima, Japan	2nd	2.24 m
1995	Asian Championships	Djakarta, Indonesia	1st	2.26 m
1995	World Championships	Gothenburg, Sweden	20th (q)	2.24 m
1995	Universiade	Fukuoka, Japan	4th	2.27 m
1996	Olympic Games	Atlanta, United States	8th	2.29 m
1997	East Asian Games	Busan, South Korea	1st	2.28 m
1997	World Indoor Championships	Paris, France	30th (q)	2.10 m
1997	World Championships	Athens, Greece	8th	2.29 m
1997	Universiade	Catania, Italy	1st	2.32 m
1998	Asian Championships	Fukuoka, Japan	2nd	2.27 m
1998	Asian Games	Bangkok, Thailand	1st	2.27 m
1999	Universiade	Palma de Mallorca, Spain	3rd	2.28 m
1999	World Championships	Seville, Spain	6th	2.29 m
2000	Olympic Games	Sydney, Australia	21st (q)	2.20 m
2001	East Asian Games	Osaka, Japan	1st	2.23 m
2002	Asian Games	Busan, South Korea	1st	2.23 m
