= Athletics at the 1998 Commonwealth Games – Men's high jump =

Men's high jump at the Commonwealth Games

The men's high jump event at the 1998 Commonwealth Games was held on 19 September in Kuala Lumpur.

== Results ==
Rank	Name	Nationality	1.95	2.00	2.05	2.10	2.15	2.20	2.24	2.28	2.31	Result	Notes
1st place, gold medalist(s)	Dalton Grant	England	–	–	–	–	o	–	o	o	xxo	2.31	
2nd place, silver medalist(s)	Ben Challenger	England	–	–	–	–	–	o	o	o	xxx	2.28	=PB
3rd place, bronze medalist(s)	Tim Forsyth	Australia	–	–	–	–	o	–	xo	o	xxx	2.28	
4	Khemraj Naiko	Mauritius				o	o	o	xo	xxo	xxx	2.28	NR
5	Brendan Reilly	England	–	–	–	–	–	xo	o	xx–	x	2.24	
6	Gavin Lendis	South Africa										2.24	
7	Loo Kum Zee	Malaysia	–	–	–	o	o	o				2.20	
8	Michael Ponikvar	Canada										2.20	
9	Mike Caza	Canada										2.10	
10	Nathan Sua'Mene	Samoa										2.05	
11	Ronan Kane	Bermuda										2.05	
12	Karl Scatliffe	British Virgin Islands										2.05	
13	Lorima Vunisa	Fiji										2.00	
14	Robert Elder	Fiji										2.00	
	Eugene Ernesta	Seychelles										DNS	
