= 1999 World Championships in Athletics – Men's high jump =

These are the official results of the Men's High Jump event at the 1999 IAAF World Championships in Athletics in Seville, Spain. There were a total number of 31 participating athletes, with two qualifying groups and the final held on Monday 23 August 1999.

== Medalists ==
Gold	Vyacheslav Voronin; Russia (RUS)
Silver	Mark Boswell; Canada (CAN)
Bronze	Martin Buß; Germany (GER)

== Schedule ==
- All times are Central European Time (UTC+1)

Qualification Round
Group A	Group B
21.08.1999 – 19:10h	21.08.1999 – 19:10h
Final Round
23.08.1999 – 19:25h

== Abbreviations ==
- All results shown are in metres

Q	automatic qualification
q	qualification by rank
DNS	did not start
NM	no mark
WR	world record
AR	area record
NR	national record
PB	personal best
SB	season best

== Results ==
=== Qualifying round ===
- Held on Saturday 21 August 1999

Qualification: Qualifying Performance 2.29 (Q) or at least 12 best performers (q) advance to the final.

Rank	Group	Name	Nationality	2.15	2.20	2.23	2.26	2.29	Result	Notes
1	A	Kwaku Boateng	Canada	–	o	o	o	o	2.29	Q
1	A	Vyacheslav Voronin	Russia	o	o	o	o	o	2.29	Q
1	A	Dragutin Topić	Yugoslavia	o	o	o	o	o	2.29	Q
4	A	Charles Austin	United States	o	–	o	xo	o	2.29	Q
4	B	Mark Boswell	Canada	o	–	xo	o	o	2.29	Q
4	B	Stefan Holm	Sweden	o	o	–	xo	o	2.29	Q
7	A	Martin Buß	Germany	–	xxo	o	o	o	2.29	Q
8	A	Staffan Strand	Sweden	–	o	o	o	xo	2.29	Q
9	A	Wilbert Pennings	Netherlands	o	o	–	xo	xo	2.29	Q
9	B	Lee Jin-taek	South Korea	o	o	–	xo	xo	2.29	Q
11	A	Abderahmane Hammad	Algeria	xxo	o	xo	xxo	xxo	2.29	Q
12	B	Brendan Reilly	Ireland	o	o	–	o	xxx	2.26	q
12	B	Steve Smith	Great Britain	–	o	–	o	x–	2.26	q
14	B	Wolfgang Kreissig	Germany	–	xo	o	o	xxx	2.26	
15	B	Tim Forsyth	Australia	o	–	xo	xxo	xxx	2.26	
16	B	Dejan Miloševic	Slovenia	o	xo	o	xxx		2.23	
17	B	Sergey Dymchenko	Ukraine	o	o	xo	xxx		2.23	
18	B	Jan Janků	Czech Republic	o	xo	xo	xxx		2.23	
19	A	Gilmar Mayo	Colombia	o	o	xxo	x–	xx	2.23	
20	A	Anthony Idiata	Nigeria	o	o	xxx			2.20	
20	A	Konstantin Matusevich	Israel	o	o	xxx			2.20	
22	A	Elvir Krehmić	Bosnia and Herzegovina	xo	o	–	xxx		2.20	
23	B	Jean-Claude Rabbath	Lebanon	o	xo	xxx			2.20	
24	B	Sergey Klyugin	Russia	xo	xo	xxx			2.20	
25	A	Ben Challenger	Great Britain	o	xxo	xxx			2.20	
25	B	Henry Patterson	United States	o	xxo	–	xxx		2.20	
27	A	Andriy Sokolovskyy	Ukraine	o	xxx				2.15	
27	B	Charles Clinger	United States	o	xxx				2.15	
29	A	Lambros Papakostas	Greece	xo	–	xxx			2.15	
29	B	Takahiro Kimino	Japan	xo	xxx				2.15	
	A	Metin Dormushev	Turkey	xxx					NM	

=== Final ===
Rank	Name	Nationality	2.20	2.25	2.29	2.32	2.35	2.37	2.40	Result	Notes
1st place, gold medalist(s)	Vyacheslav Voronin	Russia	o	–	o	o	o	o	xxx	2.37	
2nd place, silver medalist(s)	Mark Boswell	Canada	o	–	xxo	–	o	xxx		2.35	
3rd place, bronze medalist(s)	Martin Buß	Germany	o	o	o	o	xxx			2.32	
4	Dragutin Topić	Yugoslavia	o	o	o	xxo	xxx			2.32	
5	Staffan Strand	Sweden	o	–	o	xxx				2.29	
6	Kwaku Boateng	Canada	o	xxo	o	xxx				2.29	
6	Lee Jin-taek	South Korea	o	xxo	o	xxx				2.29	
8	Charles Austin	United States	o	–	xxo	xx–	x			2.29	
8	Brendan Reilly	Ireland	–	o	xxo	xxx				2.29	
10	Wilbert Pennings	Netherlands	o	o	–	xxx				2.25	
10	Abderahmane Hammad	Algeria	o	o	–	xxx				2.25	
10	Stefan Holm	Sweden	o	o	x–	xx				2.25	
	Steve Smith	Great Britain	–	–	–	–	x–	xx		NM	
