= Alfredo Deza (high jumper) =

Peruvian high jumper

Personal information
- Born: 24 August 1979 (age 46) Lobitos, Peru

Sport
- Sport: Track and field
Medal record
Representing Peru
World Junior Championships
Gold medal – first place	1998 Annecy	High jump

Alfredo Deza Ganoza (born 24 August 1979) is a Peruvian athlete specializing in the high jump. He was born in Lobitos, Talara, Piura. He is best known for winning gold at the 1998 World Junior Championships becoming the country's first and so far only World Junior Championships medalist.

He represented his country at the 2004 Olympic Games in Athens, but did not progress to the final.

His personal best jump is 2.27 metres from 2003. His father, Alfredo Deza Fuller, was also an Olympic athlete competing in the 110 metres hurdles.

== Competition record ==
Year	Competition	Venue	Position	Notes
Representing Peru
1995	South American Junior Championships	Santiago, Chile	6th	2.00 m
1995	Pan American Junior Championships	Santiago, Chile	14th (q)	2.00 m
1996	South American Junior Championships	Bucaramanga, Colombia	1st	2.12 m
1996	World Junior Championships	Sydney, Australia	13th (q)	2.10 m
1997	South American Championships	Mar del Plata, Argentina	9th	2.05 m
1997	South American Junior Championships	San Carlos, Uruguay	2nd	2.06 m
1997	Pan American Junior Championships	Havana, Cuba	4th	2.06 m
1998	South American Junior Championships	Córdoba, Argentina	1st	2.23 m
1998	World Junior Championships	Annecy, France	1st	2.21 m
1999	Pan American Games	Winnipeg, Canada	7th	2.15 m
2000	Ibero-American Championships	Rio de Janeiro, Brazil	6th	2.10 m
2001	South American Championships	Manaus, Brazil	2nd	2.20 m
2003	South American Championships	Barquisimeto, Venezuela	3rd	2.16 m
2003	Pan American Games	Santo Domingo, Dominican Republic	10th	2.13 m
2003	World Championships	Paris, France	–	NM
2004	Ibero-American Championships	Huelva, Spain	3rd	2.21 m
2004	Olympic Games	Athens, Greece	35th (q)	2.10 m
