= Wilbert Pennings =

Dutch high jumper

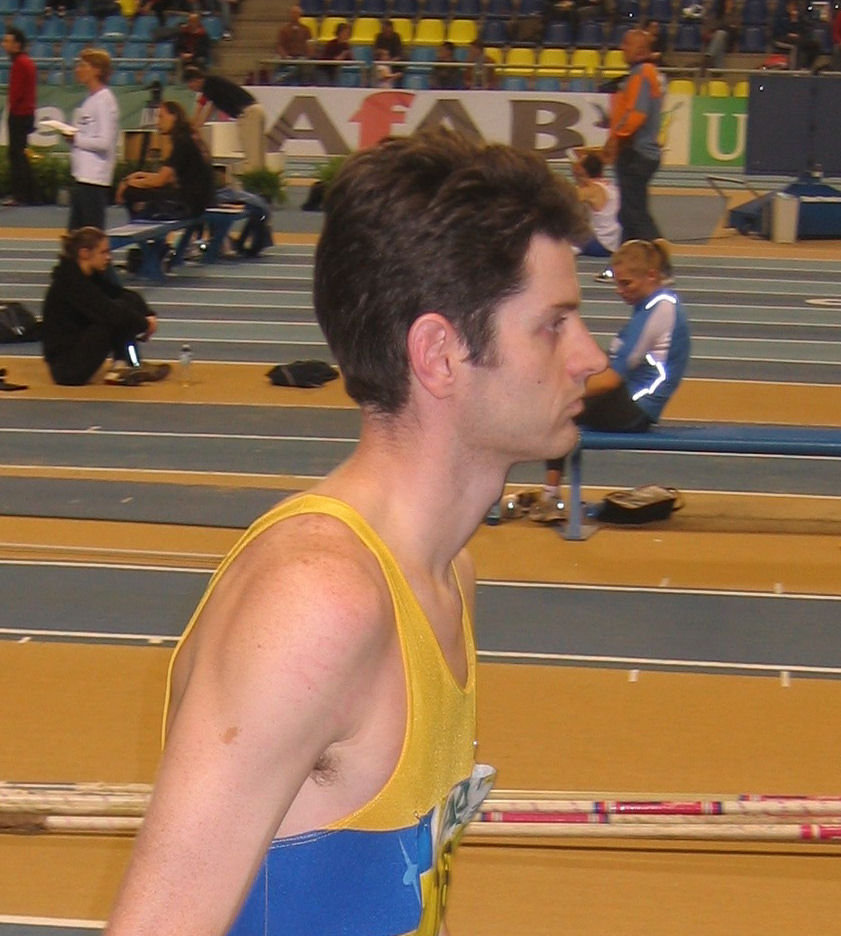

Personal information
- Born: 23 February 1975 (age 51) Alphen aan den Rijn, Netherlands

Sport
- Sport: Track and field

Wilbert Bernard Roger Pennings (born 23 February 1975) is a Dutch high jumper. He is a thirteen-time Dutch champion and holds the national indoor and outdoor records.

Pennings became Dutch high jump champion for the first time in 1995, jumping over 2.17 metres. In 1999 he improved the Dutch national outdoor record to 2.30 and finished tenth at the 1999 World Championships. In 2000 he represented the Netherlands in the 2000 Summer Olympics in Sydney, where he did not qualify for the final, jumping over 2.20.

In February 2002 in Siegen, Germany, Wilbert Pennings improved the Dutch national indoor record to 2.31 and became seventh at the 2002 European Indoor Championships, one month later. During the outdoor season he finished thirteenth at the 2002 European Championships.

Due to injuries he was unable to compete in the 2004 Summer Olympics, but finished twelfth at the 2006 European Championships.

Pennings, who is an aerospace engineering graduate, works for the Royal Netherlands Air Force and is a member of the Dutch defence top-sport program.

== Competition record ==
Year	Competition	Venue	Position	Event	Notes
Representing the Netherlands
1998	European Indoor Championships	Valencia, Spain	18th (q)	High jump	2.20 m
1998	European Championships	Budapest, Hungary	13th (q)	High jump	2.20 m
1999	Universiade	Palma de Mallorca, Spain	8th	High jump	2.19 m
1999	World Championships	Seville, Spain	10th	High jump	2.25 m
2000	European Indoor Championships	Ghent, Belgium	20th (q)	High jump	2.11 m
2000	Olympic Games	Sydney, Australia	23rd (q)	High jump	2.20 m
2002	European Indoor Championships	Vienna, Austria	7th	High jump	2.24 m
2002	European Championships	Munich, Germany	13th	High jump	2.18 m
2003	World Championships	Paris, France	27th (q)	High jump	2.20 m
2006	European Championships	Gothenburg, Sweden	12th	High jump	2.20 m

== Honours ==
(bronze) Dutch National Championships, high jump, 2007, Amsterdam
