= Nathan Leeper =

American high jumper (born 1977)

Nathan Leeper (born June 13, 1977, in Greensburg, Kansas) is a retired American high jumper.

Representing the Kansas State Wildcats track and field team, Leeper won the 1998 NCAA Division I Outdoor Track and Field Championships in the high jump.

He finished eleventh at the 2000 Olympic Games, fourth at the 2001 World Indoor Championships and seventh at the 2002 World Cup. He is the former high jump coach at Patrick Henry High School in San Diego, CA.

His personal best jump is 2.35 metres, achieved in May 2000 in Sacramento.

== Competition record ==
Year	Competition	Venue	Position	Notes
Representing the United States
1998	Goodwill Games	Uniondale, United States	6th	2.20 m
2000	Olympic Games	Sydney, Australia	11th	2.25 m
2001	World Indoor Championships	Lisbon, Portugal	4th	2.29 m
2001	Goodwill Games	Brisbane, Australia	6th	2.24 m
2001	World Championships	Edmonton, Canada	12th (q)	2.25 m
2002	World Cup	Madrid, Spain	7th	2.10 m
