= Athletics at the 2004 Summer Olympics – Men's high jump =

Men's high jump at the Games of the XXVIII Olympiad
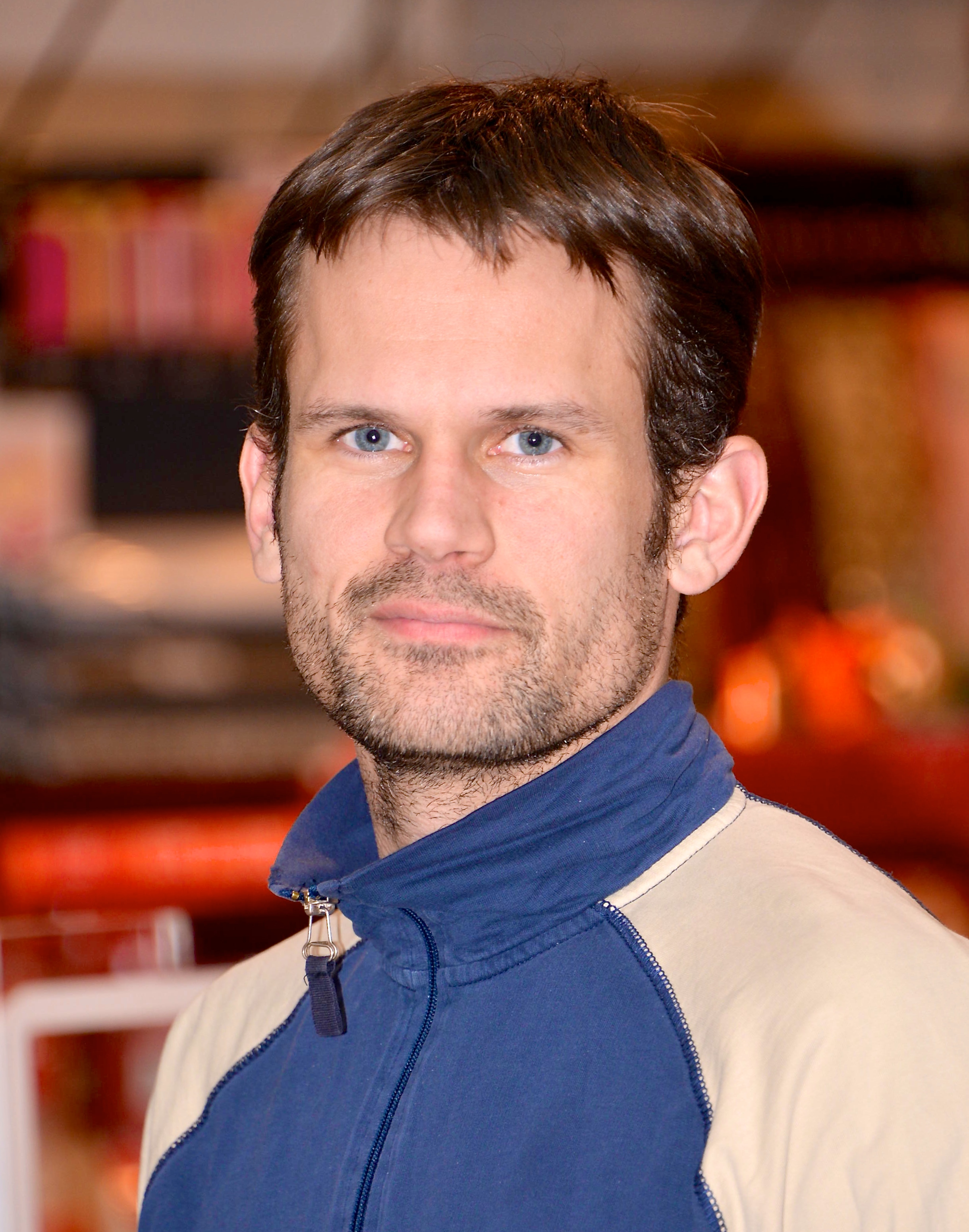
- Stefan Holm (2013)
- Venue: Olympic Stadium
- Dates: 20–22 August
- Competitors: 38 from 27 nations
- Winning height: 2.36

Medalists
1st place, gold medalist(s)		Stefan Holm; Sweden
2nd place, silver medalist(s)		Matt Hemingway; United States
3rd place, bronze medalist(s)		Jaroslav Bába; Czech Republic

The men's high jump competition at the 2004 Summer Olympics in Athens was held at the Olympic Stadium on 20–22 August. Thirty-eight athletes from 27 nations competed. The event was won by Stefan Holm of Sweden, the nation's first victory in the men's high jump and first medal in the event since Patrik Sjöberg won three in a row from 1984 to 1992. Matt Hemingway took silver, returning the United States to the podium after a one-Games absence. Jaroslav Bába's bronze was the first medal in the event for the Czech Republic.

== Background ==
This was the 25th appearance of the event, which is one of 12 athletics events to have been held at every Summer Olympics. The returning finalists from the 2000 Games were bronze medalist Abderrahmane Hammad of Algeria, fourth-place finisher Stefan Holm of Sweden, sixth-place finishers Mark Boswell of Canada and Staffan Strand of Sweden, and tenth-place finisher Vyacheslav Voronin of Russia. Dragutin Topić competed under for the fourth time, under his third flag (the Olympic flag as an Independent Olympic Participant in 1992, Yugoslavia in 1996 and 2000, and now Serbia and Montenegro). Holm was favored; he had placed second at the 2003 world championship (the winner, Jacques Freitag, was present in Athens but injured) and "had won 17 consecutive meets leading up to Athina."

Cyprus, Serbia and Montenegro, Slovenia, and Sri Lanka each made their debut in the event. The United States made its 24th appearance, most of any nation, having missed only the boycotted 1980 Games.

== Qualification ==
The qualification period for Athletics was 1 January 2003 to 9 August 2004. For the men's high jump, each National Olympic Committee was permitted to enter up to three athletes that had jumped 2.30 metres or higher during the qualification period. The maximum number of athletes per nation had been set at 3 since the 1930 Olympic Congress. If an NOC had no athletes that qualified under that standard, one athlete that had jumped 2.27 metres or higher could be entered.

== Competition format ==
The competition consisted of two rounds, qualification and final. Athletes start with a qualifying round. Jumping in turn, each athlete attempts to achieve the qualifying height. If they fail at three jumps in a row, they are eliminated. After a successful jump, they receive three more attempts to achieve the next height. Once all jumps have been completed, all athletes who have achieved the qualifying height go through to the final. If fewer than 12 athletes achieve the qualifying standard, the best 12 athletes go through. Cleared heights reset for the final, which followed the same format until all athletes fail three consecutive jumps.

== Records ==
Prior to the competition, the existing world record, Olympic record, and world leading jump were as follows:

World record	Javier Sotomayor (CUB)	2.45	Salamanca, Spain	27 July 1992
Olympic record	Charles Austin (USA)	2.39	Atlanta, United States	28 July 1996
World Leading	Stefan Holm (SWE)	2.37	Stockholm, Sweden	12 February 2004

No new records were set during the competition.

== Schedule ==
All times are Greece Standard Time (UTC+2)

Date	Time	Round
Friday, 20 August 2004	20:00	Qualifying
Sunday, 22 August 2004	19:30	Final

== Results ==
Key

- o = Height cleared
- x = Height failed
- – = Height passed
- r = Retired
- SB = Season's best
- PB = Personal best
- NR = National record
- AR = Area record
- OR = Olympic record
- WR = World record
- WL = World lead
- NM = No mark
- DNS = Did not start
- DQ = Disqualified

=== Qualifying round ===
Rule: Qualifying standard 2.28 (Q) or at least best 12 qualified (q).

Rank	Group	Athlete	Nation	2.10	2.15	2.20	2.25	2.28	Height	Notes
1	B	Stefan Holm	Sweden	—	—	o	o	o	2.28	Q
1	A	Jamie Nieto	United States	—	—	o	o	o	2.28	Q
1	A	Mark Boswell	Canada	—	—	o	o	o	2.28	Q, SB
4	A	Andriy Sokolovskyy	Ukraine	—	o	o	xo	o	2.28	Q
4	B	Lisvany Pérez	Cuba	o	xo	o	o	o	2.28	Q, PB
4	B	Svatoslav Ton	Czech Republic	o	o	xo	o	o	2.28	Q
7	A	Alessandro Talotti	Italy	—	o	xo	xxo	o	2.28	Q
8	A	Yaroslav Rybakov	Russia	—	o	o	o	xo	2.28	Q
9	A	Dragutin Topić	Serbia and Montenegro	—	o	xo	o	xo	2.28	Q, =SB
9	B	Jaroslav Bába	Czech Republic	—	o	o	xo	xo	2.28	Q
11	B	Matt Hemingway	United States	—	–	o	o	xxo	2.28	Q
12	B	Vyacheslav Voronin	Russia	—	o	xo	xo	xxo	2.28	Q
13	A	Hennazdy Maroz	Belarus	—	o	o	o	xxx	2.25	
13	B	Nicola Ciotti	Italy	—	o	o	o	xxx	2.25	
15	A	Ştefan Vasilache	Romania	—	o	xo	o	xxx	2.25	
15	B	Abderrahmane Hammad	Algeria	—	xo	o	o	xxx	2.25	SB
17	B	Jessé de Lima	Brazil	—	o	xxo	o	xxx	2.25	
18	B	Staffan Strand	Sweden	—	–	o	xo	xxx	2.25	
18	A	Kyriakos Ioannou	Cyprus	o	o	o	xo	xxx	2.25	
20	A	Grzegorz Sposób	Poland	—	o	o	xxx	—N/a	2.20	
20	B	Rožle Prezelj	Slovenia	—	o	o	xxx	—N/a	2.20	
20	B	Jacques Freitag	South Africa	—	o	o	xxx	—N/a	2.20	
20	A	Manjula Kumara Wijesekara	Sri Lanka	—	o	o	xxx	—N/a	2.20	
24	A	Linus Thörnblad	Sweden	o	xxo	o	xxx	—N/a	2.20	
25	A	Oskari Frösén	Finland	o	o	xo	xxx	—N/a	2.20	
25	A	Roman Fricke	Germany	—	o	xo	xxx	—N/a	2.20	
25	B	Jean-Claude Rabbath	Lebanon	o	o	xo	xxx	—N/a	2.20	
25	B	Robert Wolski	Poland	—	o	xo	xxx	—N/a	2.20	
25	B	Pyotr Brayko	Russia	—	o	xo	x-	—N/a	2.20	
30	A	Tomáš Janků	Czech Republic	o	xo	xo	xxx	—N/a	2.20	
31	B	Marko Aleksejev	Estonia	o	o	xxx	—N/a		2.15	
31	B	Javier Bermejo	Spain	o	o	xxx	—N/a		2.15	
33	A	László Boros	Hungary	xo	o	xxx	—N/a		2.15	
34	A	Tora Harris	United States	—	xo	xxx	—N/a		2.15	
35	A	Alfredo Deza	Peru	o	xxx	—N/a			2.10	
36	B	Liu Yang	China	xxo	x	—N/a			2.10	
—	A	Adrian O'Dwyer	Ireland	xxx	—N/a				NM	
—	B	Aleksey Lesnichiy	Belarus	—	xxx	—N/a			DPG	^{*}

^{*} Aleksey Lesnichiy was disqualified after failing an anti-doping test.

=== Final ===
Rank	Athlete	Nation	2.20	2.25	2.29	2.32	2.34	2.36	Height	Notes
1st place, gold medalist(s)	Stefan Holm	Sweden	o	o	o	xo	xxo	o	2.36	=PB
2nd place, silver medalist(s)	Matt Hemingway	United States	o	o	—	o	o	xxx	2.34	SB
3rd place, bronze medalist(s)	Jaroslav Bába	Czech Republic	o	o	o	xxo	o	xxx	2.34	PB
4	Jamie Nieto	United States	o	xo	—	o	xo	xxx	2.34	PB
5	Andriy Sokolovskyy	Ukraine	o	o	o	o	xxx	—N/a	2.32	
6	Yaroslav Rybakov	Russia	o	xo	o	xo	xxx	—N/a	2.32	=SB
7	Mark Boswell	Canada	o	—	o	xxx	—N/a		2.29	SB
8	Svatoslav Ton	Czech Republic	o	xo	xo	xx-	x	—N/a	2.29	
9	Vyacheslav Voronin	Russia	o	—	xxo	xxx	—N/a		2.29	
10	Dragutin Topić	Serbia and Montenegro	xo	—	xxo	—	xxx	—N/a	2.29	
11	Lisvany Pérez	Cuba	o	xo	xxx	—N/a			2.25	
12	Alessandro Talotti	Italy	o	xxo	—	xxx	—N/a		2.25	
