= Jacques Freitag =

South African high jumper (1982–2024)

Personal information
- Nationality: South African
- Born: 11 June 1982 Warrenton, Cape Province, South Africa
- Died: c. 1 July 2024 (aged 42) Pretoria West, Pretoria, Gauteng, South Africa
- Height: 2.04 m (6 ft 8 in)
- Weight: 83 kg (183 lb)

Sport
- Country: South Africa
- Sport: Track and field
- Event: High jump

Achievements and titles
- Personal best: High jump: 2.39 (Paris 2003)
Medal record
Men's Athletics
Representing South Africa
World Championships
Gold medal – first place	2003 Paris	High jump
World Junior Championships
Gold medal – first place	2000 Santiago	High jump
World Youth Championships
Gold medal – first place	1999 Bydgoszcz	High jump

Jacques Freitag (11 June 1982 – c. 1 July 2024) was a South African high jumper. Freitag is one of only eleven athletes (along with Valerie Adams, Usain Bolt, Veronica Campbell-Brown, Armand Duplantis, Yelena Isinbayeva, Kirani James, Faith Kipyegon, Jana Pittman, Dani Samuels, and David Storl) to win World Championship titles at the youth, junior, and senior levels of an athletic event.

== Early life and education ==
Freitag was born to police officers Hendrina Pieters and Jan Lewis. His parents divorced during childhood and his father later died by suicide. His mother, Hendrina Pieters, was South African high jump champion in 1973 with a personal best of 1.74 metres. He has an older sister, Chrissie. He was in Hoërskool Erasmus in Bronkhorstspruit, then he attended Afrikaanse Hoër Seunskool, located in Pretoria. He won the 2003 University of Pretoria Sportsman of the year.

== Later life and murder ==
Freitag went missing on 17 June 2024, and on 1 July, his body was found with three gunshot wounds and a broken arm in a field in Pretoria. Rudolph Lubbe and Shantellè Oosthuizen were arrested on 16 July for suspected involvement in Freitag's murder. Lubbe was accused of hiring Freitag to murder Oosthuizen's fiancé, Louis Harmse. Harmse alleged Freitag attacked him with a brick on 13 June. According to his sister, Freitag struggled with addiction and, at the time of his death, was divorced and had one estranged son.

== Competition record ==
Year	Competition	Venue	Position	Notes
Representing South Africa
1999	World Youth Championships	Bydgoszcz, Poland	1st	2.16 m
1999	All-Africa Games	Johannesburg, South Africa	4th	2.20 m
2000	World Junior Championships	Santiago, Chile	1st	2.24 m
2001	World Championships	Edmonton, Canada	23rd (q)	2.15 m
2003	World Championships	Paris, France	1st	2.35 m
2004	Olympic Games	Athens, Greece	20th (q)	2.20 m
2005	World Championships	Helsinki, Finland	18th (q)	2.20 m

== See also ==
- List of solved missing person cases (2020s)

Achievements
Preceded by (Russia) Vyacheslav Voronin	Men's High Jump Best Year Performance; 2002	Succeeded by (Sweden) Stefan Holm (i) (Poland) Aleksander Walerianczyk
