= Christian Rhoden =

German high jumper (born 1974)

Personal information
- Born: 27 March 1974 (age 52) Duisburg, West Germany

Sport
- Sport: Track and field

Christian Rhoden (born 27 March 1974) is a retired German high jumper.

He was born in Duisburg and represented LG Bayer Leverkusen. At the German championships he won the silver medal in 1997, 1999 and 2000 and bronze medals in 1995 and 2002. He became indoor champion in 1997 and 2002, and won several other indoor medals.

Internationally he finished eleventh at the 1998 European Championships, eleventh at the 1999 Universiade and a tied seventh at the 2000 European Indoor Championships. He also competed at the 1997 World Indoor Championships and the 2000 Olympic Games without reaching the final.

His personal best jump was 2.32 metres, achieved in July 1998 in Luxembourg-Ville.

== Links ==
- Christian Rhoden at World Athletics
- Christian Rhoden at Tilastopaja (registration required)
- Christian Rhoden at Olympics.com
- Christian Rhoden at Olympedia
