= Sergey Klyugin =

Russian high jumper

Personal information
- Born: 24 March 1974 (age 52) Kineshma, Soviet Union

Sport
- Sport: Track and field
Medal record
Representing Russia
Olympic Games
Gold medal – first place	2000 Sydney	High jump
European Championships
Bronze medal – third place	1998 Budapest	High jump

Sergey Petrovich Klyugin (Russian: Сергей Петрович Клюгин; born 24 March 1974) is a Russian high jumper. He won the gold medal at the 2000 Summer Olympics with 2.35m, one centimetre behind his personal best jump from 1998. A bronze medal at 1998 European Championships was his only other international medal.

== Honors and awards ==
- Honored Master of Sports of Russia (2000)
- Honored Coach of Russia (2010)
- Order of Honour (2001)
- Order of Friendship (2013)
- Coach of the Year (2013)

== Major achievements ==
Year	Competition	Venue	Position	Notes
Representing the Soviet Union
1991	European Junior Championships	Thessaloniki, Greece	2nd	2.27 m
Representing the Unified Team
1992	World Junior Championships	Seoul, South Korea	5th	2.20 m
Representing Russia
1997	World Indoor Championships	Paris, France	14th (q)	2.24 m
1997	World Championships	Athens, Greece	11th	2.29 m
1997	Universiade	Catania, Italy	5th	2.23 m
1998	Goodwill Games	Uniondale, United States	7th	2.20 m
1998	European Championships	Budapest, Hungary	3rd	2.32 m
1999	World Championships	Seville, Spain	24th (q)	2.20 m
2000	Olympic Games	Sydney, Australia	1st	2.35 m
2001	World Championships	Edmonton, Canada	4th	2.30 m
2001	Goodwill Games	Brisbane, Australia	7th	2.20 m
2004	World Indoor Championships	Budapest, Hungary	12th (q)	2.24 m

== Family ==
Married to Viktoriya Klugina, they have three children together, a daughter and two sons. Has two sons from a previous marriage.
