= Stefan Holm =

Swedish high jumper (born 1976)

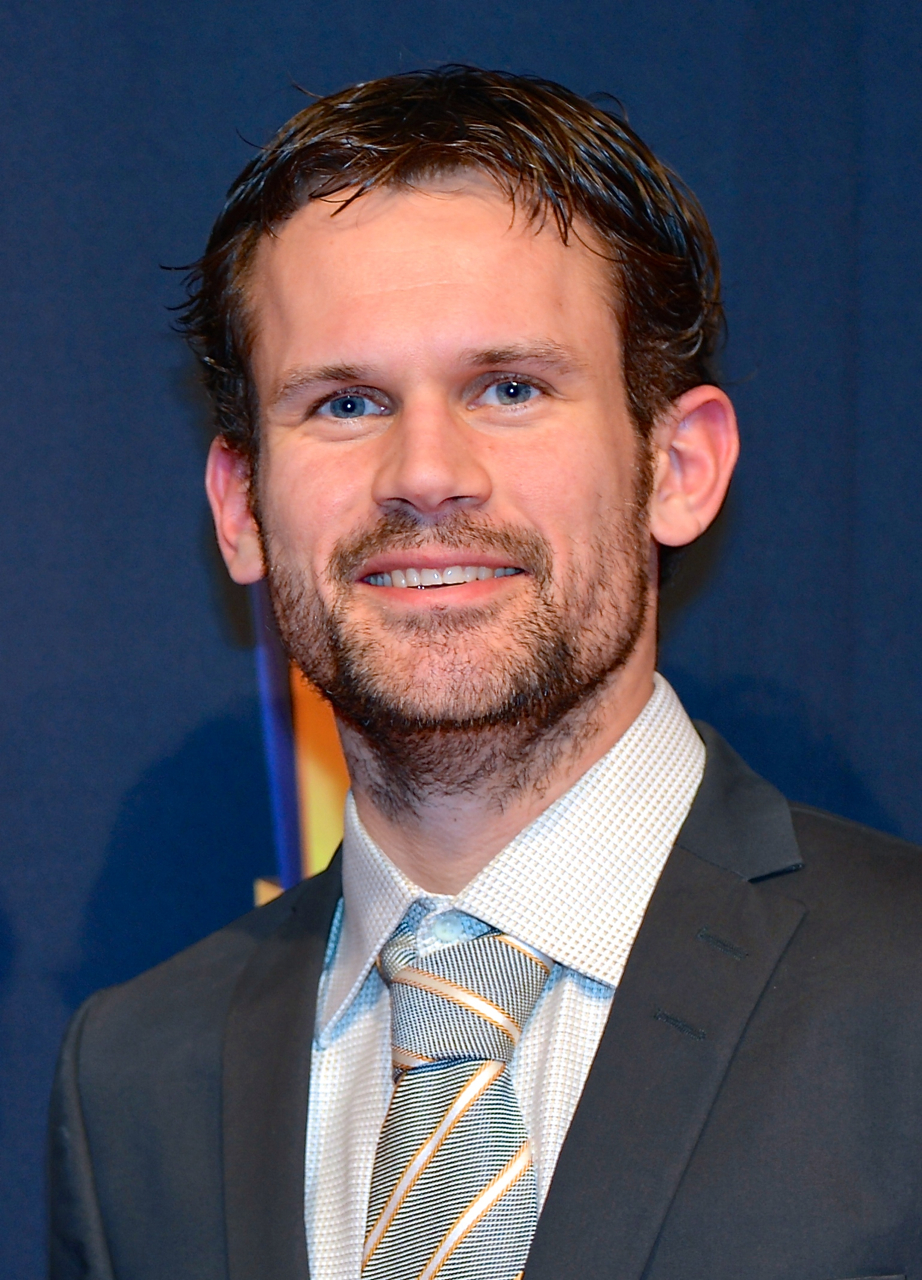
- Stefan Holm during the Swedish Sports Awards inside the Stockholm Globe Arena in January 2014

Personal information
- Full name: Stefan Christian Holm
- Nationality: Swedish
- Born: 25 May 1976 (age 50) Forshaga, Sweden
- Height: 1.81 m (5 ft 11 in)
- Weight: 71 kg (157 lb)
- Children: Melwin Lycke Holm

Sport
- Country: Sweden
- Event: High jump
- Club: Kils AIK
- Retired: 2008

Achievements and titles
- Personal bests: 2.37 m 2.40 m (indoors)
Medal record
Men's Athletics
Event	1st	2nd	3rd
Olympic Games	1	0	0
World Championships	0	1	0
World Indoor Championships	4	0	0
European Championships	0	1	1
European Indoor Championships	2	1	0
Continental Cup	0	0	0
Total	7	3	1
Olympic Games
Gold medal – first place	2004 Athens	High jump
World Championships
Silver medal – second place	2003 Paris	High jump
World Indoor Championships
Gold medal – first place	2001 Lisbon	High jump
Gold medal – first place	2003 Birmingham	High jump
Gold medal – first place	2004 Budapest	High jump
Gold medal – first place	2008 Valencia	High jump
European Championships
Silver medal – second place	2002 Munich	High jump
Bronze medal – third place	2006 Gothenburg	High jump
European Indoor Championships
Gold medal – first place	2005 Madrid	High jump
Gold medal – first place	2007 Birmingham	High jump
Silver medal – second place	2002 Vienna	High jump
IAAF World Athletics Final
Gold medal – first place	2004 Monte Carlo	High jump
Silver medal – second place	2003 Monte Carlo	High jump
Silver medal – second place	2007 Stuttgart	High jump
Silver medal – second place	2008 Stuttgart	High jump
Bronze medal – third place	2005 Monte Carlo	High jump
Bronze medal – third place	2006 Stuttgart	High jump

Stefan Christian Holm (born 25 May 1976) is a retired Swedish high jumper. He won an Olympic gold medal, a silver in the World Championships, and one silver and one bronze medal in the European Championships. His personal records are 2.37 m (7 ft 9 1/4 in) (outdoors, set 2008) and 2.40 m (7 ft 10 1/4 in) (indoors, set 2005). Clearing the bar 59 centimeters (23 in) over his own height, he currently holds, jointly with American Franklin Jacobs, the world record for height differential.

Holm is currently coach of his son Melwin Lycke Holm.

== Biography ==
His inspiration for high-jumping began when he was eight years old. He saw a Swedish high-jumping legend, and former world-record holder, Patrik Sjöberg, compete on television.

He set an indoor personal best of 2.36 m (7 ft 8 3/4 in) in 2003 to win the Hochsprung mit Musik meeting, and managed to reach the same height outdoors the following year while winning the Internationales Hochsprung-Meeting Eberstadt. In 2004, Holm won the 2004 Summer Olympics high jump gold in Athens with a jump of 2.36 and was awarded the Svenska Dagbladet Gold Medal. This year Holm also won the Jerring Award.

Holm finished 4th at the 2008 Summer Olympics with a leap of 2.32 m. On 13 September 2008 he announced his retirement from the sport. Holm ended his 20-year career with a second place at the World Athletics Final in Stuttgart.

He briefly returned to high jump competition in 2010 for a charity event: the Auto Lounge Comeback competition in Sweden. As his main rival Patrik Sjöberg had a knee injury, Holm agreed to jump off his wrong foot to even the score. He beat Sjöberg in the wrong-footed faceoff and went back to his normal takeoff to jump 2.15 m for third behind Ukhov and Donald Thomas.

He became an IOC member at the 125th IOC Session in Buenos Aires in September 2013. In October 2019, he announced he would leave his seat following the 2020 Summer Olympics.

On his 40th birthday in May 2016, Holm set a new Swedish veteran record for 40-year-olds (M40). With 2.06 m he broke the previous record of 2.05 m, which had been held by Egon Nilsson for almost 50 years.

Holm participated in the Swedish version of Who Do You Think You Are? in 2016. The longest ancestry tracing in the series' history was successfully made, covering 29 generations and 1,000 years back to the Swedish king Olof Skötkonung. This lineage is on Holm's maternal great-great-great-grandfather's side.

Holm's son is Melwin Lycke Holm, winner of the 2023 European Athletics U20 Championships in the high jump, whom he coaches. He has previously coached Swedish Olympic high jumper Sofie Skoog.

== Competition record ==
Year	Competition	Venue	Position	Notes
Representing Sweden
1993	European Junior Championships	San Sebastián, Spain	11th	2.06 m
1994	World Junior Championships	Lisbon, Portugal	7th	2.10 m
1995	European Junior Championships	Nyíregyháza, Hungary	6th	2.17 m
1997	World Indoor Championships	Paris, France	8th	2.25 m
1998	European Indoor Championships	Valencia, Spain	19th (q)	2.20 m
1998	European Championships	Budapest, Hungary	7th	2.27 m
1999	World Indoor Championships	Maebashi, Japan	6th	2.25 m
1999	Universiade	Palma de Mallorca, Spain	4th	2.25 m
1999	World Championships	Seville, Spain	10th	2.25 m
2000	European Indoor Championships	Ghent, Belgium	4th	2.32 m
2000	Olympic Games	Sydney, Australia	4th	2.32 m
2001	World Indoor Championships	Lisbon, Portugal	1st	2.32 m
2001	World Championships	Edmonton, Canada	4th	2.30 m
2001	Goodwill Games	Brisbane, Australia	1st	2.33 m
2002	European Indoor Championships	Vienna, Austria	2nd	2.30 m
2002	European Championships	Munich, Germany	2nd	2.29 m
2003	World Indoor Championships	Birmingham, United Kingdom	1st	2.35 m
2003	World Championships	Paris, France	2nd	2.32 m
2004	World Indoor Championships	Budapest, Hungary	1st	2.35 m
2004	Olympic Games	Athens, Greece	1st	2.36 m
2005	European Indoor Championships	Madrid, Spain	1st	2.40 m
2005	World Championships	Helsinki, Finland	7th	2.29 m
2006	World Indoor Championships	Moscow, Russia	5th	2.30 m
2006	European Championships	Gothenburg, Sweden	3rd	2.34 m
2007	European Indoor Championships	Birmingham, United Kingdom	1st	2.34 m
2007	World Championships	Osaka, Japan	4th	2.33 m
2008	World Indoor Championships	Valencia, Spain	1st	2.36 m
2008	Olympic Games	Beijing, China	4th	2.32 m

== Other victories ==
- 1998: Berlin (IAAF Golden League-meet) - 2.28 m
- 1999: Lahti (European Cup first league) - 2.27 m; Stockholm (Grand Prix) - 2.29 m
- 2000: Gateshead (European cup super league) - 2.28 m
- 2001: Helsinki (Grand Prix) - 2.26 m; Vaasa (European cup first league) - 2.28 m; Brisbane (Goodwill Games) - 2.33 m
- 2002: Doha (Grand Prix) - 2.28 m; Seville (European cup first league) - 2.33 m; Zürich (Golden League-meet) - 2.35 m; Rieti (Grand Prix) - 2.29m; Paris (Grand Prix Final) - 2.31 m
- 2003: Lappeenranta (European cup first league) - 2.24 m; Rethymno (athletics meet) - 2.34 m; Gateshead (Grand Prix) - 2.30 m
- 2004: Bydgoszcz (European cup super league) - 2.32 m; Iraklio (Grand Prix) - 2.33 m; Internationales Hochsprung-Meeting Eberstadt) - 2.36 m; Stockholm (Grand Prix) - 2.33 m; Monaco (World Athletics Final) - 2.33 m
- 2005: Gävle (European cup first league) - 2.27 m; Paris Saint-Denis (Golden League) - 2.32 m; Stockholm (Grand Prix) - 2.33 m; Oslo (Golden League) - 2.29 m
- 2006: London (Grand Prix) - 2.34 m
- 2007: Vaasa (European cup first league) - 2.30 m; Lausanne (Grand Prix) - 2.28 m; London (Grand Prix) - 2.32 m; Stockholm (Grand Prix) - 2.35 m
- 2008: Istanbul (European cup first league) - 2.25 m; Athens (Grand Prix) - 2.37 m; Stockholm (Grand Prix) - 2.30 m

Awards
Preceded by Carolina Klüft	Svenska Dagbladet Gold Medal; 2004	Succeeded by Kajsa Bergqvist
Sporting positions
Preceded by (South Africa) Jacques Freitag	Men's High Jump Best Year Performance alongside (Poland) Aleksander Walerianczyk (2003); 2003-2005 (i)	Succeeded by (Russia) Yaroslav Rybakov (i) (Russia) Ivan Ukhov (i) (Russia) Andrey Silnov
