= Ben Challenger =

English high jumper (born 1978)

Personal information
- Nationality: British (English)
- Born: 7 March 1978 (age 48) Loughborough, England
- Height: 186 cm (6 ft 1 in)
- Weight: 75 kg (165 lb)
- Spouse: Lucy Challenger

Sport
- Sport: Athletics
- Event: High jump
- Club: Belgrave Harriers
Medal record
Men's athletics
Representing England
Commonwealth Games
Silver medal – second place	1998 Kuala Lumpur	High jump
Bronze medal – third place	2002 Manchester	High jump
Representing Great Britain
Summer Universiade
Gold medal – first place	1999 Palma de Mallorca	High jump

Benjamin Arthur Challenger (born 7 March 1978) is an English retired high jumper. His career highlight is winning a silver medal at the Commonwealth Games and competing at the 2000 Summer Olympics.

== Biography ==
Born in Loughborough, Leicestershire, Challenger attended Shepshed High School and later he studied sports science at Loughborough University (a course he later abandoned in favour of full-time high jump training). As a youth he considered a career in basketball, and toured the US with the Leicester Riders, leading to offers from NBA talent scouts acting for US universities, which he turned down.

He represented England at the 1998 Commonwealth Games in Kuala Lumpur, Malaysia, winning a silver medal, and his personal best jump of 2.30 metres was achieved when he won the 1999 Summer Universiade. At the 2000 Olympic Games in Sydney, he represented Great Britain in the high jump event.

He represented the England team again at the 2002 Commonwealth Games in Manchester and won a bronze medal.

Challenger was a five-times British high jump champion after winning the British AAA Championships title from 2000 to 2005.

He is the son of the Showaddywaddy drummer, Romeo Challenger, and the brother of singer Tamzin Challenger.

Challenger is married to recruitment consultant and fitness instructor Lucy. Together they run Studio Challenger in Berkshire, a pilates school.

== Competition record ==
Year	Competition	Venue	Position	Notes
Representing Great Britain and England
1996	World Junior Championships	Sydney, Australia	2nd	2.21 m
1997	European Junior Championships	Ljubljana, Slovenia	2nd	2.20 m
1997	Universiade	Catania, Italy	11th	2.10 m
1998	European Indoor Championships	Valencia, Spain	10th	2.22 m
1998	Commonwealth Games	Kuala Lumpur, Malaysia	2nd	2.28 m
1999	Universiade	Palma de Mallorca, Spain	1st	2.30 m
1999	European U23 Championships	Gothenburg, Sweden	1st	2.30 m
1999	World Championships	Seville, Spain	25th (q)	2.20 m
2000	European Indoor Championships	Ghent, Belgium	14th (q)	2.16 m
2001	World Championships	Edmonton, Canada	17th (q)	2.20 m
2002	Commonwealth Games	Manchester, United Kingdom	3rd	2.25 m
2002	European Championships	Munich, Germany	16th (q)	2.15 m
2005	World Championships	Helsinki, Finland	14th (q)	2.24 m
2006	Commonwealth Games	Melbourne, Australia	8th	2.15 m
