= Itay Margalit =

Itai Margalit (Hebrew: איתי מרגלית; born 25 January 1970) is a retired Israeli high jumper.

He finished ninth at the 1998 European Indoor Championships. He also competed at the 1990 European Championships, the 1993 World Championships, the 1994 European Championships, the 1997 World Indoor Championships and the 1998 European Championships without reaching the final.

Margalit was an All-American jumper for the Kansas State Wildcats track and field team, finishing runner-up in the high jump at the 1996 NCAA Division I Indoor Track and Field Championships.

His personal best jump is 2.27 metres, achieved in June 1998 in Tel Aviv.
