= Matt Hemingway =

American Olympic high jumper (born 1972)

Olympic medal record

Men's athletics

Representing the United States
Silver medal – second place	Athens 2004	High jump

Matthew Eliot Hemingway (born October 24, 1972) is a retired American track and field athlete. He won a silver medal in the high jump at the 2004 Olympic Games in Athens by clearing a height of 2.34 meters (7 ft 8 in). Reflecting on this he said: "I'm ecstatic about winning the silver. You don't lose gold medals. People win them. I won a silver and Stefan Holm won a gold." His personal best jump came at the 2000 US Indoor Championship where he leaped 2.38 m (7 ft 9 3/4 in). He jumped off of his left leg.

Hemingway is 6 ft 7 in (or 2.01 m) tall and during his career weighed approximately 185 lb (or 84 kg). He originally is from Buena Vista, Colorado and graduated the University of Arkansas in 1996. His best college performance was a second-place finish at the 1996 NCAA Outdoor Championships.

He came eighth at the 1991 U.S. Junior Championships and jumped 7 ft 4 in. In 1993 he placed 8th at the NCAA Outdoors and was 15th in qualifying at USA Outdoors with a jump of 7 ft 4.5 in. He was fourth at the collegiate SEC Outdoors in 1994. In 1995 he was third at the NCAA Outdoors, second at the SEC Outdoors and 12th (a tie) at USA Outdoors. His year's best was a jump of 7 ft 4.5 in. In his senior year, 1996, he finished third at the Southeastern Conference championships, but then earned 2nd place at the NCAA Outdoors championships. At the 1996 USA Olympic Trials he earned first alternate position for the US Olympic Team by placing fourth. He finished the 1996 season ranked fifth in U.S., with a best jump of 7 ft 6.5 in.

His first year out of school was disappointing, with a best of only 7' 3" (set indoors) followed by a tenth-place finish at the 1997 USA Outdoors championships. Saying he was burnt out and that jumping was no longer fun, Hemingway sat out for two years and worked as a white water rafting guide in Colorado in 1998 and 1999, marrying his Arkansas college sweetheart, Kate, in 1998. He then returned to competition in a big way in 2000.

== USA Championship Meet Record Indoors ==
He returned to jumping during the 2000 indoor season and won the US Indoor Championship with his personal best jump of 2.38 m (7 ft 9 3/4 in). The meet was held in Atlanta, and Hemingway easily defeated Charles Austin and Jeremy Fischer, who could clear only 2.27. Hemingway's 2.38 was not only a personal best, it was also a new Indoor Championship Meet Record and the highest indoor jump in the world that year. At the 2000 USA Olympic Trials he had a very poor meet, finishing tenth with a jump of only 7' 1.5 (2.17m)- a height at which he would normally begin competing.

A stress fracture in his jumping foot stopped him from competing through the following year. He made a comeback in 2002 and was second at the USA Outdoors. He had a great, early start to the 2003 outdoor season, establishing a new personal (outdoor) best of 2.34 (7' 8.25") at the Modesto Relays in Modesto, California on 10 May. He repeated his 2nd-place finish at 2003 USA championships, and placed 13th at the 2003 World Championships in Athletics.

== 2004 Athens Olympics ==
In 2004, at the (relatively advanced) age of 31, he finally earned a place on the US Olympic Team with a jump of 2.30 (7 ft 6.5 in) in the Trials. At the Olympics in Athens, he easily cleared the (automatic) qualifying height of 2.20 to reach the finals. In the finals on 22 August, Hemingway began jumping at 2.20 and was perfect (no misses) through 2.34. Four men cleared that height, including American teammate Jamie Nieto. As the bar was raised 2 centimeters to 2.36, Hemingway was in first place by virtue of being the only jumper with a perfect record. But when Sweden's Stefan Holm was the only jumper to scale 2.36, Hemingway was awarded the silver and Jaroslav Baba took the bronze (because of two misses at 2.32). For Hemingway, the 2.34 matched his personal best outdoors.

== Personal life ==
He is related to the famous writer Ernest Hemingway. Along with his wife, he has adopted one Ethiopian child and plan to adopt another. In the future, he and his wife plan to adopt a couple of other children. Hemingway and his wife appeared in the episode "Making Room" (season 3, episode 3) of the HGTV television show Carter Can with Carter Oosterhouse. The show highlights their attempt to make room for their first adopted child.

Matt also works as a guide for whitewater rafting company Noah's Ark Whitewater Rafting and Adventure in Buena Vista, CO close to where he grew up. In the past Matt worked as manager for a cellular phone store, technical engineer for a wireless carrier (he worked full-time while training for a chance at the Olympics). As of 2006, Hemingway leads a department at the InterActive Corporation (IAC)-owned online home improvement advertiser ServiceMagic in Golden, Colorado. Currently not working at ServiceMagic
