= Vyacheslav Voronin =

Russian high jumper

Vyacheslav Nikolayevich Voronin (Russian: Вячеспав Никопаевич Воронин; born 5 April 1974 in Vladikavkaz) is a Russian track and field athlete who specialised in the high jump.

Voronin was a World Champion (1999) and European Indoor Champion (2000). His personal best is 2.40 metres, set in London in August 2000. He competed in Athens 2004 and Helsinki 2005, but did not win medals in either.

== International competitions ==
Year	Competition	Venue	Position	Notes
Representing Russia
1993	European Junior Championships	San Sebastián, Spain	2nd	2.18 m
1998	European Indoor Championships	Valencia, Spain	2nd	2.31 m
1999	World Indoor Championships	Maebashi, Japan	2nd	2.36 m
1999	World Championships	Seville, Spain	1st	2.37 m
2000	European Indoor Championships	Ghent, Belgium	1st	2.34 m
2000	Olympic Games	Sydney, Australia	10th	2.29 m
2001	World Indoor Championships	Lisbon, Portugal	9th	2.25 m
2001	World Championships	Edmonton, Canada	2nd	2.33 m
2001	Goodwill Games	Brisbane, Australia	2nd	2.31 m
2004	Olympic Games	Athens, Greece	9th	2.29 m
2005	World Championships	Helsinki, Finland	8th	2.29 m
2008	Olympic Games	Beijing, China	14th (q)	2.25 m

Sporting positions
Preceded by (Cuba) Javier Sotomayor	Men's High Jump Best Year Performance; 1999–2001	Succeeded by (South Africa) Jacques Freitag
