= Pavel Fomenko =

Russian high jumper

Pavel Fomenko (born 29 June 1976) is a Russian high jumper.

He finished ninth at the 2002 European Indoor Championships, twelfth at the 2002 European Championships, and won the bronze medal at the 2005 European Indoor Championships.
