= Mark Boswell (athlete) =

Canadian high jumper (born 1977)

Personal information
- Born: September 28, 1977 (age 48) Mandeville, Jamaica
- Home town: Brampton, Ontario, Canada

Sport
- Sport: Track and field
Medal record
Men's Athletics
Representing Canada
World Championships
Silver medal – second place	1999 Seville	High jump
Bronze medal – third place	2003 Paris	High jump
Commonwealth Games
Gold medal – first place	2002 Manchester	High jump
Gold medal – first place	2006 Melbourne	High jump
Pan American Games
Gold medal – first place	1999 Winnipeg	High jump
Universiade
Silver medal – second place	1999 Palma de Mallorca	High jump

Mark Boswell (born July 28, 1977) is a Canadian high jumper, who won a total number of six national titles in the men's high jump event.

Boswell was born in Mandeville, Jamaica and grew up in Brampton, Ontario.

Boswell attended the University of Texas at Austin where he was a five-time All-American in the high jump, won the NCAA indoor and outdoor high jump titles in 1999 and 2000 and still holds UT records in both event.

In 2006, he won gold at the Commonwealth Games held in Melbourne, Australia. His other notable achievements in international competition include 7th place at the 2004 Summer Olympics, 6th place at the 2000 Summer Olympics, a silver medal at the 1999 World Championships in Seville, Spain and a bronze at the 2003 World Championships in Saint-Denis, France.

Still a resident of Brampton, Boswell is a father of five and works selling medical supplies. In 2013 he was inducted in the Athletics Canada Hall of Fame.

== Competition record ==
Year	Competition	Venue	Position	Notes
Representing Canada
1996	World Junior Championships	Sydney, Australia	1st	2.24 m
1997	World Championships	Athens, Greece	22nd (q)	2.23 m
1999	Universiade	Palma de Mallorca, Spain	2nd	2.30 m
1999	Pan American Games	Winnipeg, Canada	1st	2.25 m
1999	World Championships	Seville, Spain	2nd	2.35 m
2000	Olympic Games	Sydney, Australia	6th	2.32 m
2001	World Indoor Championships	Lisbon, Portugal	12th	2.20 m
2001	Jeux de la Francophonie	Ottawa, Canada	1st	2.31 m
2001	World Championships	Edmonton, Canada	6th	2.25 m
2001	Goodwill Games	Brisbane, Australia	4th	2.31 m
2002	Commonwealth Games	Manchester England	1st	2.28 m
2003	World Indoor Championships	Birmingham, United Kingdom	5th	2.25 m
2003	World Championships	Paris, France	3rd	2.32 m
2004	Olympic Games	Athens, Greece	7th	2.29 m
2005	World Championships	Helsinki, Finland	4th	2.29 m
2006	Commonwealth Games	Melbourne, Australia	1st	2.26 m
