= Ramon Kaju =

Estonian athlete

Personal information
- Born: 19 February 1973 (age 53) Viljandi, then part of Estonian SSR, Soviet Union

Sport
- Sport: Track and field

Ramon Kaju (born 19 February 1973) is a retired Estonian high jumper and decathlete.

He finished tenth at the 1998 European Indoor Championships. He also competed at the 1998 European Championships without reaching the final.

His personal best jump is 2.28 metres, achieved in August 1998 in Haapsalu. His personal best in decathlon was 7608 points achieved in 1997.

In 2000–2001 he played basketball in Estonian League team Nybit.
