= Labros Papakostas =

Greek high jumper (born 1969)

Personal information
- Born: 20 October 1969 (age 57) Karditsa, Greece

Sport
- Sport: Track and field
Medal record
Representing Greece
World Indoor Championships
Silver medal – second place	1995 Barcelona	High jump
Silver medal – second place	1997 Paris	High jump

Labros Papakostas (Greek: Λάμπρος Παπακώστας, born 20 October 1969) is a retired Greek high jumper who won two silver medals at the World Indoor Championships in 1995 and 1997.

His personal best, achieved in Athens in 1992, was 2.36 metres, when he took the Greek national record from Panagiotis Kontaxakis.

He is an eight-time national champion for Greece in the men's high jump event.

== Achievements ==
Year	Competition	Venue	Position	Notes
Representing Greece
1988	World Junior Championships	Sudbury, Canada	2nd	2.25 m
1989	European Indoor Championships	The Hague, Netherlands	12th	2.15 m
1989	Universiade	Duisburg, West Germany	19th (q)	2.10 m
1990	European Championships	Split, Yugoslavia	22nd (q)	2.15 m
1991	Mediterranean Games	Athens, Greece	5th	2.20 m
1992	European Indoor Championships	Genoa, Italy	15th	2.15 m
1992	Olympic Games	Barcelona, Spain	18th (q)	2.20 m
1994	European Indoor Championships	Paris, France	9th	2.23 m
1994	European Championships	Helsinki, Finland	8th	2.28 m
1995	World Indoor Championships	Barcelona, Spain	2nd	2.35 m
1995	World Championships	Gothenburg, Sweden	16th (q)	2.27 m
1996	Olympic Games	Atlanta, United States	6th	2.32 m
1997	World Indoor Championships	Paris, France	2nd	2.32 m
1997	World Championships	Athens, Greece	6th	2.32 m
1998	European Indoor Championships	Valencia, Spain	5th	2.26 m
1999	World Championships	Seville, Spain	29th (q)	2.15 m

Olympic Games
Preceded by Charalambos Cholidis	Flagbearer for Greece; Barcelona 1992	Succeeded by Pyrros Dimas
