= Toni Huikuri =

Finnish high jumper (born 1979)

Toni Olavi Huikuri (born 17 September 1979 in Helsinki) is a Finnish high jumper.

He was born in Helsinki and represented the club HKV Helsinki. He finished sixth at the 1996 World Junior Championships and competed at the 2000 Olympic Games and the 2000 European Indoor Championships without reaching the final. He never became Finnish champion.

His personal best jump is 2.31 metres, achieved in June 2002 in Bratislava. This is a tied Finnish record.
