= Mikhail Tsvetkov =

Russian high jumper (born 1980)

Mikhail Tsvetkov (born 4 May 1980 in Ryazan) is a Russian high jumper.

He finished fourth at the 2003 World Championships in Saint-Denis near Paris, with a jump of 2.29 metres.

His personal best jump is 2.30 metres, achieved in July 2003 in Madrid.
