= Kenny Evans (high jumper) =

American high jumper (born 1979)

Personal information
- Full name: Kenny Evans
- Born: April 6, 1979 (age 47) Pine Bluff, Arkansas, U.S.
- Height: 6 ft 2 in (188 cm)
- Weight: 163 lb (74 kg; 11 st 9 lb)

Sport
- Country: United States
- Sport: Athletics
- Event: High jump
- College team: Arkansas State University
- Club: Arkansas Razorbacks

Achievements and titles
- Personal best: 2.31 m (7 ft 7 in) (2000)

Kenny Evans (born April 6, 1979) is a retired American high jumper. He finished thirteenth at the 2000 Olympic Games. His personal best jump is 2.31 metres (7 ft 7 in), achieved in March 2000 in Fayetteville.

Evans won the high jump at the 1998 and 2001 NCAA Indoor Track and Field Championships. He was also a three-time champion indoors and a winner outdoors at the Southeastern Conference Championships.

Evans is the father of professional basketball player Keenan Evans, who previously played college basketball at Texas Tech University.
