= Andrei Chubsa =

Belarusian high jumper

Andrei Chubsa (Belarusian: Андрэй Чубса; born 29 November 1982) is a Belarusian high jumper.

He won the bronze medal at the 1999 World Youth Championships, finished sixth at the 2000 World Junior Championships and tenth at the 2001 IAAF World Indoor Championships, and won the gold medal at the 2001 European Junior Championships.

His personal best jump is 2.32 metres, achieved in July 2002 in Stockholm.
