= Dimitrios Kokotis =

Greek high jumper

Personal information
- Born: 12 April 1972 (age 54) Karditsa, Greece

Sport
- Sport: Track and field

Dimitrios Kokotis (born 12 April 1972) is a retired Greek high jumper.

He finished thirteenth at the 1995 IAAF World Indoor Championships, eighth at the 1998 European Indoor Championships and fifth at the 1998 European Championships.

His personal best jump is 2.32 metres, achieved in July 1998 in Athens. This ranks him second among Greek high jumpers, only behind Lambros Papakostas.
