= Andriy Sokolovskyy =

Ukrainian high jumper

Personal information
- Born: 16 July 1978 (age 48) Moscow, Soviet Union

Sport
- Sport: Track and field
Medal record
Representing Ukraine
World Indoor Championships
| Silver medal – second place | 2001 Lisbon | High jump |
European U23 Championships
| Silver medal – second place | 1999 Gothenburg | High jump |

Andriy Sokolovskyy (Ukrainian: Андрій Соколовський; born 16 July 1978) is a Ukrainian high jumper. His personal best jump is 2.38 metres, achieved in July 2005 in Rome (Golden Gala).

== Achievements ==
| Year | Competition | Venue | Position | Notes |
Representing Ukraine
| 1999 | World Indoor Championships | Maebashi, Japan | 6th | 2.25 m |
| 1999 | European U23 Championships | Gothenburg, Sweden | 2nd | 2.28 m |
| 2001 | World Indoor Championships | Lisbon, Portugal | 2nd | 2.29 m |
| 2002 | European Indoor Championships | Vienna, Austria | 4th | 2.27 m |
| 2003 | World Indoor Championships | Birmingham, England | 8th | 2.25 m |
| 2003 | World Championships | Paris, France | 8th | 2.29 m |
| 2003 | World Athletics Final | Monte Carlo, Monaco | 6th | 2.27 m |
| 2004 | World Indoor Championships | Budapest, Hungary | 7th | 2.25 m |
| 2004 | Olympic Games | Athens, Greece | 5th | 2.32 m |
| 2004 | World Athletics Final | Monte Carlo, Monaco | 5th | 2.27 m |
| 2005 | World Athletics Final | Monte Carlo, Monaco | 5th | 2.29 m |
| 2006 | World Indoor Championships | Moscow, Russia | 6th | 2.26 m |
| 2006 | European Championships | Gothenburg, Sweden | 19th | 2.19 m |
