= Pedro's Cup =

The Pedro's Cup is a biannual athletics event of two legs, which features an indoor track and field competition in January or February and an outdoor competition during the European summer period. The first competition of each year since 2005 has taken place in Bydgoszcz, Poland. The second competition of each year has taken place in another city, currently Poznan, Warsaw and Szczecin have hosted the summer/autumn Pedro's cup competition. The event typically draws top-level competition, including at least fifteen Olympic medalists in 2008 and more in 2009. The meet is unique because it draws best athletes of the world to compete in a rather cold climate.

At the 2008 event, Asafa Powell became the first sprinter to turn in a sub-10 second 100 metres time in Poland, and in 2009, he equalled the meet record of 9.82 seconds. The 2010 indoor event featured only three events (pole vault, shot put and high jump) but Anna Rogowska provided a record-breaking performance by vaulting 4.81 m and beating the previous Polish best mark.

== Finals ==
Ed.	Location	Date
1st	Bydgoszcz	26 January 2005
2nd	Poznan	30 July 2005
3rd	Bydgoszcz	25 January 2006
4th	Warsaw	30 August 2006
5th	Bydgoszcz	14 February 2007
6th	Warsaw	19 September 2007
7th	Bydgoszcz	20 February 2008
8th	Szczecin	17 September 2008
9th	Bydgoszcz	10 February 2009
10th	Szczecin	15 September 2009
11th	Bydgoszcz	10 February 2010
12th	Bydgoszcz	16 February 2011
13th	Bydgoszcz	8 February 2012
14th	Bydgoszcz	12 February 2013
15th	Bydgoszcz	31 January 2014
16th	Łódź	17 February 2015
17th	Łódź	5 February 2016

== Results ==
=== 2005 ===
The 2005 Pedro's Cup indoor competition was held in Bydgoszcz on 26 January 2005. This was the first time the competition had taken place.

Event	Gold		Silver		Bronze	
Men's high jump	Yaroslav Rybakov; Russia	2.31	Jacques Freitag; South Africa	2.28	Jamie Nieto; United States	2.25
Women's pole vault	Anna Rogowska; Poland	4.73	Svetlana Feofanova; Russia	4.53	Monika Pyrek; Poland	4.53

=== 2006 ===
The 2006 Pedro's Cup indoor competition was held in Bydgoszcz on 25 January 2006.

Event	Gold		Silver		Bronze	
Men's high jump	Tomáš Janků; Czech Republic	2.30	Linus Thörnblad; Sweden	2.28	Mark Boswell; Canada	2.24
Women's pole vault	Anna Rogowska; Poland Svetlana Feofanova; Russia	4.64	Not awarded		Monika Pyrek; Poland	4.54

=== 2007 ===
The 2007 Pedro's Cup indoor competition was held in Bydgoszcz on 14 February 2007.

Men's high jump
Position	Name	Nationality	Height	Progression
1	Linus Thörnblad	Sweden	2.34 m	2.20/1 2.24/1 2.28/1 2.30/3 2.32/1 2.34/1 2.36/XXX
2	Yuriy Krymarenko	Ukraine	2.34 m	2.15/1 2.20/1 2.24/1 2.28/3 2.30/1 2.32/1 2.34/3 2.36/XXX
3	Tora Harris	United States	2.30 m	
4	Andrey Tereshin	Russia	2.30 m	
5	Michał Bieniek	Poland	2.24 m	
6	Svatoslav Ton	Czech Republic	2.24 m	
7	Aleksander Waleriańczyk	Poland	2.20 m	
7	Grzegorz Sposób	Poland	2.20 m	
9	Tomáš Janků	Czech Republic	2.15 m	

Women's pole vault
Position	Name	Nationality	Height	Progression
1	Yelena Isinbayeva	Russia	4.84 m	4.64/1 4.74/X 4.84/1 4.94/XXX
2	Svetlana Feofanova	Russia	4.74 m	4.44/3 4.54/1 4.64/1 4.74/2 4.84/XXX
3	Anna Rogowska	Poland	4.64 m	
4	Pavla Hamáčková-Rybová	Czech Republic	4.64 m	
5	Róża Kasprzak	Poland	4.44 m	
5	Fabiana Murer	Brazil	4.44 m	
7	Joanna Piwowarska	Poland	4.44 m	
8	Anastasija Reiberger	Germany	4.43 m	

=== 2008 ===
The 2008 Pedro's Cup indoor competition was held in Bydgoszcz on 20 February 2008.

Event	Gold		Silver		Bronze	
Men's high jump	Yaroslav Rybakov; Russia	2.34 =MR	Aleksey Dmitrik; Russia	2.30	Tomasz Janku; Poland; Jaroslav Bába; Russia	2.24
Women's pole vault	Svetlana Feofanova; Russia	4.71	Yelena Isinbayeva; Russia Monika Pyrek; Poland	2.30	Not awarded	

=== 2009 ===
The 2009 Pedro's Cup indoor competition was held in Bydgoszcz, 10 February 2009. This competition featured men's shot put for the first time.

Event	Gold		Silver		Bronze	
Men's high jump	Tora Harris; United States	2.32	Konstadinos Baniotis; Greece	2.24	Artsiom Zaitsau; Belarus	2.24
Men's shot put	Christian Cantwell; United States	21.47	Tomasz Majewski; Poland	20.83	Andrei Mikhnevich; Belarus	20.06
Women's pole vault	Monika Pyrek; Poland	4.71	Anna Rogowska; Poland	4.71	Joanna Piwowarska; Poland	4.51

== Meeting records (indoor) ==
=== Men ===
Men's indoor meeting records of the Pedro's Cup
Event	Record	Athlete	Nationality	Date	Place	Ref.	Video
60 m	6.47	Kim Collins	Saint Kitts and Nevis	17 February 2015	Łódź		
60 m hurdles	7.45	Orlando Ortega	Cuba	17 February 2015	Łódź		
High jump	2.34 m	Linus Thörnblad	Sweden	14 February 2007	Bydgoszcz		
High jump	2.34 m	Yaroslav Rybakov	Russia	20 February 2008	Bydgoszcz		
Pole vault	6.08 m	Renaud Lavillenie	France	31 January 2014	Bydgoszcz		
Shot put	21.80 m	Ryan Whiting	United States	17 February 2015	Łódź		
Weight throw	23.22 m	Pawel Fajdek	Poland	31 January 2014	Bydgoszcz		

=== Women ===
Women's indoor meeting records of the Pedro's Cup
Event	Record	Athlete	Nationality	Date	Place	Ref.
60 m	7.15	Ewa Swoboda	Poland	5 February 2016	Łódź	
60 m hurdles	7.97	Alina Talay	Belarus	5 February 2016	Łódź	
High jump	1.98 m	Kamila Lićwinko	Poland	17 February 2015	Łódź	
Pole vault	4.84 m	Yelena Isinbayeva	Russia	14 February 2007	Bydgoszcz	
