= 2007 European Athletics Indoor Championships – Men's high jump =

The Men's high jump event at the 2007 European Athletics Indoor Championships was held on March 3–4.

== Medalists ==
Gold	Silver	Bronze
Stefan Holm; Sweden	Linus Thörnblad; Sweden	Martyn Bernard; Great Britain

== Results ==
=== Qualification ===
Qualification: Qualification Performance 2.30 (Q) or at least 8 best performers advanced to the final.

Rank	Group	Athlete	Nationality	2.08	2.13	2.18	2.23	2.27	2.30	Result	Notes
1.	A	Tomáš Janku	Czech Republic	–	o	o	xo	o	o	2.30	Q
2.	A	Stefan Holm	Sweden	–	–	o	o	xo	xo	2.30	Q
2.	B	Aleksander Waleriańczyk	Poland	–	o	o	o	xo	xo	2.30	Q, PB
4.	A	Martyn Bernard	Great Britain	–	–	xo	o	o	xxo	2.30	Q, PB
5.	B	Linus Thörnblad	Sweden	–	–	o	o	o	x–	2.27	q
6.	A	Oskari Frösén	Finland	–	o	o	o	xo	xxx	2.27	q, =SB
7.	B	Andrea Bettinelli	Italy	–	o	xo	o	xo	xxx	2.27	q
8.	B	Andrey Tereshin	Russia	–	o	xo	o	xxo	xxx	2.27	q
8.	B	Niki Palli	Israel	o	o	xo	o	xxo	xxx	2.27	q, PB
10.	A	Artsiom Zaitsau	Belarus	–	o	o	xo	xxx		2.23	
10.	B	Peter Horák	Slovakia	–	o	o	xo	xxx		2.23	
10.	B	Samson Oni	Great Britain	–	o	o	xo	xxx		2.23	
10.	B	Svatoslav Ton	Czech Republic	–	o	o	xo	xxx		2.23	
14.	B	Osku Torro	Finland	–	o	xo	xo	xxx		2.23	
15.	A	Marko Aleksejev	Estonia	–	o	o	xxx			2.18	
15.	B	Martijn Nuijens	Netherlands	o	o	o	xxx			2.18	
15.	B	Normunds Pupols	Latvia	o	o	o	xxx			2.18	=PB
18.	B	Nicola Ciotti	Italy	–	xo	xo	xxx			2.18	
19.	A	Grzegorz Sposób	Poland	–	o	xxo	xxx			2.18	
20.	A	Aleksey Dmitrik	Russia	–	xxo	xxo	xxx			2.18	
21.	A	Filippo Campioli	Italy	–	o	xxx				2.13	
21.	A	Rožle Prezelj	Slovenia	–	o	xxx				2.13	
21.	A	Stefan Vasilache	Romania	–	o	xxx				2.13	

=== Final ===
Rank	Athlete	Nationality	2.15	2.20	2.25	2.29	2.32	2.34	2.41	Result	Notes
1st place, gold medalist(s)	Stefan Holm	Sweden	–	o	o	o	xxo	xo	xxx	2.34	
2nd place, silver medalist(s)	Linus Thörnblad	Sweden	–	o	o	xo	xo	xxx		2.32	
3rd place, bronze medalist(s)	Martyn Bernard	Great Britain	–	o	o	xxo	xxx			2.29	
4	Tomás Janku	Czech Republic	o	xo	o	xxx				2.25	
5	Aleksander Waleriańczyk	Poland	o	o	xxx					2.20	
5	Andrea Bettinelli	Italy	o	o	xxx					2.20	
7	Andrey Tereshin	Russia	o	xo	xxx					2.20	
8	Oskari Frösén	Finland	o	xxx						2.15	
8	Niki Palli	Israel	o	xxx						2.15	
