= Track and field at the 2007 Military World Games =

Track and field at the IV World Military Games
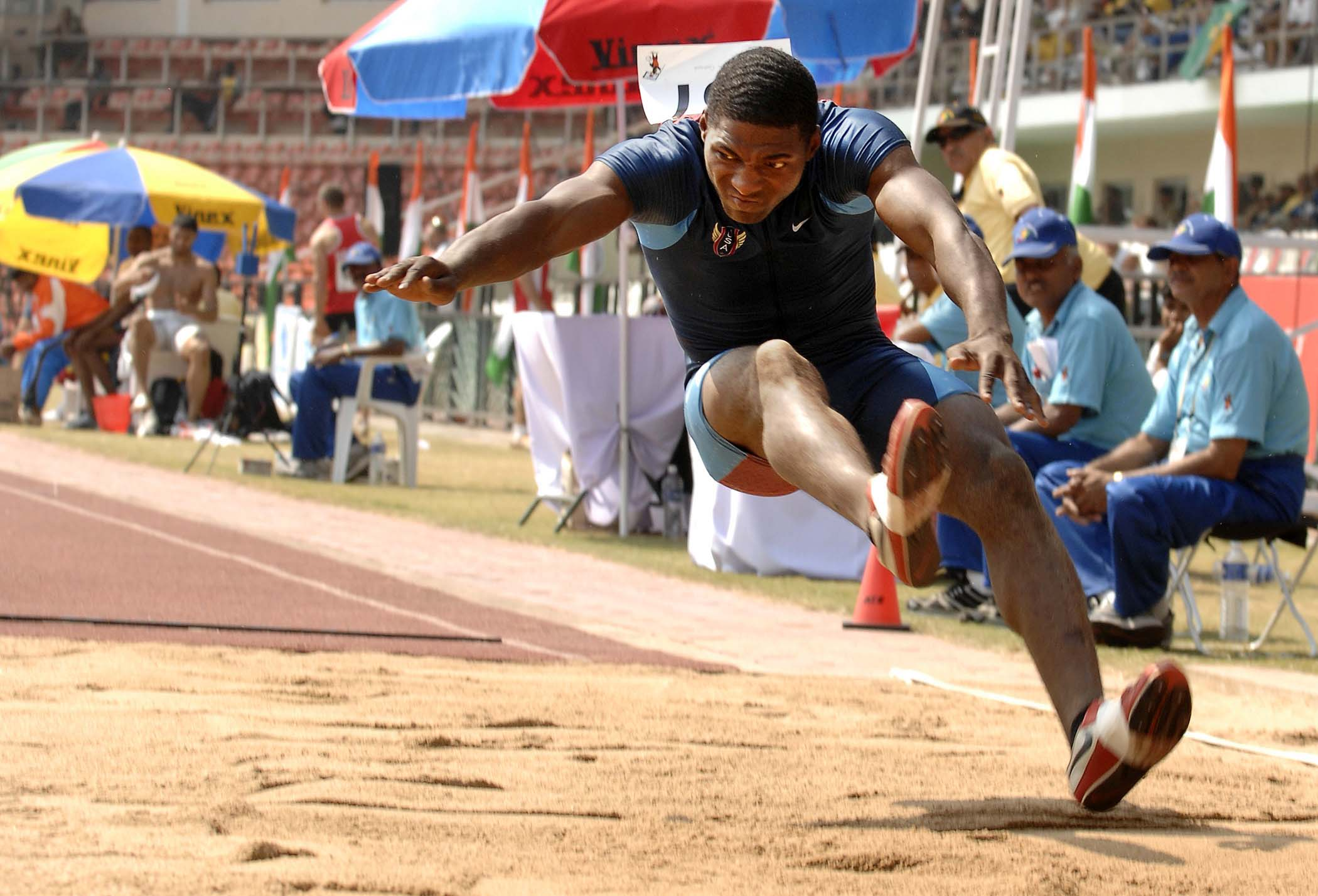
- American Francois Gatson competing in the long jump
- Dates: 15 – 18 October 2007
- Host city: Hyderabad, India
- Venue: G. M. C. Balayogi Athletic Stadium
- Level: Military personnel
- Events: 36
- Records set: 7 Games records

At the 2007 Military World Games, the track and field events were held at the G. M. C. Balayogi Athletic Stadium in Hyderabad, India from 15 – 18 October 2007. A total of 36 events were contested, of which 22 by male and 14 by female athletes. Kenya topped the medal table with five gold medals and a total of 12 – the track and field competition accounted for all of the African nation's medals at the games, which brought them sixth place on the overall games medal count. Russia took second with four golds and eight silvers, having the joint greatest medal total. Poland, the People's Republic of China, and Saudi Arabia also achieved four gold medals. Athletes from thirty three of the participating countries reached the podium at the four-day competition organised by the Conseil International du Sport Militaire, which had no obvious dominant nation.

The competition featured a number of athletes who had been successful at the 2007 World Championships in Athletics: Hrysopiyi Devetzi—the world triple jump bronze medallist—won her event, as did hammer throwers Zhang Wenxiu and Primož Kozmus. Some World Championships medallists found themselves in the silver medal spot on the military stage, including Daniela Yordanova (1500 m), Anna Chicherova (high jump), and Shadrack Korir (1500 m).

Samuel Francis set a new Games record in the 100 metres, but his attempt to double his medals in the 200 metres was thwarted by a false start elimination. John Cheruiyot Korir retained his title in the 10,000 metres in a Games record time. The men's high jump competition was unusual in that all the medalists achieved the same height (2.26 m) which made them all Games record holders, although the medals were decided on count-back. A total of seven Games records were broken or equalled at the 2007 edition of the Games.

== Records ==
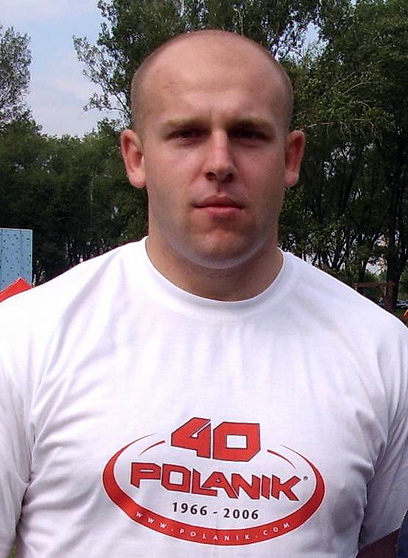
Poland's Piotr Małachowski threw a Games record in the discus.

Name	Event	Country	Record	Type
Samuel Francis	100 metres	Qatar	10.11	GR
John Cheruiyot Korir	10,000 metres	Kenya	28:13.52	GR
?	4×100 metres relay	Italy	39.28	GR
Andrey Tereshin; Aleksander Waleriańczyk; Viktor Shapoval	High jump	Russia; Poland; Ukraine	2.26	GR
Mykola Savolaynen	Triple jump	Ukraine	16.93 m	GR=
Piotr Małachowski	Discus throw	Poland	65.97 m	GR
Zhang Wenxiu	Women' s hammer throw	China	72.25 m	GR
Key:WR — World record • AR — Area record • GR — Games record • NR — National record

== Medal summary ==
=== Men ===
Event	Gold		Silver		Bronze	
100 metres	Samuel Francis (QAT)	10.10 GR	Simone Collio (ITA)	10.29	Łukasz Chyła (POL)	10.39
200 metres	Marcin Jędrusiński (POL)	20.70	Alessandro Cavallaro (ITA)	20.82	Omar Jouma Bilal Al-Salfa (UAE)	21.10
400 metres	Nagmeldin Ali Abubakr (SUD)	46.00	Daniel Dąbrowski (POL)	46.36	Prasanna Amarasekara (SRI)	46.48
800 metres	Mohammed Al-Salhi (KSA)	1:49.02	Abubakar Kaki (SUD)	1:49.23	Justus Koech (KEN)	1:49.24
1500 metres	Gideon Gathimba (KEN)	3:41.01	Shadrack Korir (KEN)	3:41.56	Chatholi Hamza (IND)	3:42.84
5000 metres	Mark Kiptoo (KEN)	13:51.74	Brahim Beloua (MAR)	13:52.32 PB	Rabah Aboud (ALG)	13:53.74
10,000 metres	John Cheruiyot Korir (KEN)	28:13.52 GR	Mark Kiptoo (KEN)	28:22.62	Aadam Ismaeel Khamis (BHR)	28:42.76
110 metres hurdles	Ji Wei (CHN)	13.44	Mohamed Issa Al-Thawadi (QAT)	13.60	Gregory Sedoc (NED)	13.75
400 metres hurdles	Edrees Hawsawi (KSA)	50.25	Thiago Sales (BRA)	50.97	Jeetender Singh (IND)	51.70
3000 metres steeplechase	Hamid Ezzine (MAR)	8:37.80	Henry Kipkosgei (KEN)	8:41.83	Yoann Kowal (FRA)	8:45.16
20,000 m track walk	Cui Zhide (CHN)	1:23:43.0	Ivan Trotski (BLR)	1:25:23.7	Matej Tóth (SVK)	1:25:42.7
4×100 metres relay	Italy (ITA); Rosario La Mastra; Simone Collio; Jacques Riparelli; Alessandro Cavallaro	39.28 GR	Poland (POL); Zbigniew Tulin; Marcin Jędrusiński; Marcin Marciniszyn; Artur Kohutek; Łukasz Chyła†	39.52	Saudi Arabia (KSA); Yahya Habeeb; Yahya Al-Gahes; Salem Mubarak Al-Yami; Hussain Al-Saba; Howsawi Mussa†; Hussain Al-Zaki†	39.73
4×400 metres relay	Saudi Arabia (KSA); Mohammed Al-Sahi; Hamdan Al-Bishi; Ismail Al-Sabani; Hamed Hamdan Al-Bishi; Younes Ibrahim Al-Hosah; Mohammed Shaween; Edrees Hawsawi	3:05.10	Kenya (KEN); Victor Kibet; David Kirui; Mark Mutai; Amon Chepsongol; Justus Koech†; Stephen Kamolo†	3:06.11	Sudan (SUD); Nagmeldin Ali Abubakr; Adam El-Nour; William Rabih Koudi; Abdelbashar El-Farzdag; Abubakar Kaki Khamis†; Hafedh Mohamed Hussein†	3:08.70
High jump	Andrey Tereshin (RUS)	2.26 m GR	Aleksander Waleriańczyk (POL)	2.26 m GR	Viktor Shapoval (UKR)	2.26 m GR
Pole vault	Florian Sürth (GER)	5.20 m	Paul Gensic (USA)	5.10 m	Matteo Rubbiani (ITA)	5.00 m
Long jump	Hussein Taher Al-Sabee (KSA)	8.04 m	Julien Fivaz (SUI)	7.57 m	Volodymyr Zyuskov (UKR)	7.55 m
Triple jump	Mykola Savolaynen (UKR)	16.93 m GR=	Danil Burkenya (RUS)	16.84 m	Fabrizio Schembri (ITA)	16.23 m
Shot put	Miran Vodovnik (SLO)	19.93 m	Khalid Habash Al-Suwaidi (QAT)	19.74 m	Andrei Siniakou (BLR)	18.73 m
Discus throw	Piotr Małachowski (POL)	65.87 m GR	Zoltán Kővágó (HUN)	64.38 m	Rashid Shafi Al-Dosari (QAT)	60.03 m
Hammer throw	Primož Kozmus (SLO)	75.98 m	Nicola Vizzoni (ITA)	74.96 m	Jens Rautenkranz (GER)	72.38 m
Javelin throw	Levente Bartha (ROM)	77.16 m	Ari Mannio (FIN)	76.77 m	Yeóryios Íltsios (GRE)	73.23 m
Decathlon	Aleksey Drozdov (RUS)	7712 pts	Marcin Dróżdż (POL)	7396 pts	Ahmad Hassan Moussa (QAT)	7173 pts

- † Ran in heats only

=== Women ===
Event	Gold		Silver		Bronze	
100 metres	Yelena Bolsun (RUS)	11.45	Bettina Müller-Weissina (AUT)	11.51	Daria Korczyńska (POL)	11.54
200 metres	Daria Korczyńska (POL)	23.44	Yelena Bolsun (RUS)	23.48	Ewelina Klocek (POL)	23.73
400 metres	Menaka Wickramasinghe (SRI)	52.93	Yelena Ildeykina (RUS)	54.78	Josephine Nyarunda (KEN)	54.88
800 metres	Brigita Langerholc (SLO)	2:04.05	Anna Sidorova (UZB)	2:04.70	Natallia Dziadkova (BLR)	2:05.85
1500 metres	Sylwia Ejdys (POL)	4:16.90	Daniela Yordanova (BUL)	4:17.00	Inna Poluškina (LAT)	4:17.80
5000 metres	Peninah Arusei (KEN)	15:42.20	Nadia Ejjafini (BHR)	15:48.74	Kareema Jasim (BHR)	15:53.07
10,000 metres	Doris Changewo (KEN)	32:32.44	Irene Kwambai (KEN)	32:33.28	Nadia Ejjafini (BHR)	32:36.41
100 metres hurdles	Yevgeniya Snihur (UKR)	13.23	Micol Cattaneo (ITA)	13.36	Judith Ritz (GER)	13.65
4×100 metres relay	Italy (ITA); Anita Pistone; Maria Aurora Salvagno; Rita De Cesaris; Micol Cattaneo	44.97	Russia (RUS); Anna Pyatykh; Yekaterina Grigorieva; Yelena Bolsun; Yelena Ildeykina	46.22	Germany (GER); Birgit Rockmeier; Judith Ritz; Christine Schulz; Karin Ertl	46.49
High jump	Vita Palamar (UKR)	1.98 m	Anna Chicherova (RUS)	1.96 m	Vita Styopina (UKR)	1.94 m
Long jump	Hrysopiyi Devetzi (GRE)	6.69 m	Anna Pyatykh (RUS)	6.23 m	Anastasiya Juravleva (UZB)	6.21 m
Shot put	Anna Omarova (RUS)	17.78 m	Yulia Leantsiuk (BLR)	16.32 m	Wang Lihong (CHN)	15.82 m
Hammer throw	Zhang Wenxiu (CHN)	72.25 m GR	Ester Balassini (ITA)	67.09 m	Clarissa Claretti (ITA)	66.94 m
Javelin throw	Zhang Li (CHN)	59.96 m	Mariya Abakumova (RUS)	59.60 m	Indrė Jakubaitytė (LTU)	54.93 m

== Medal table ==
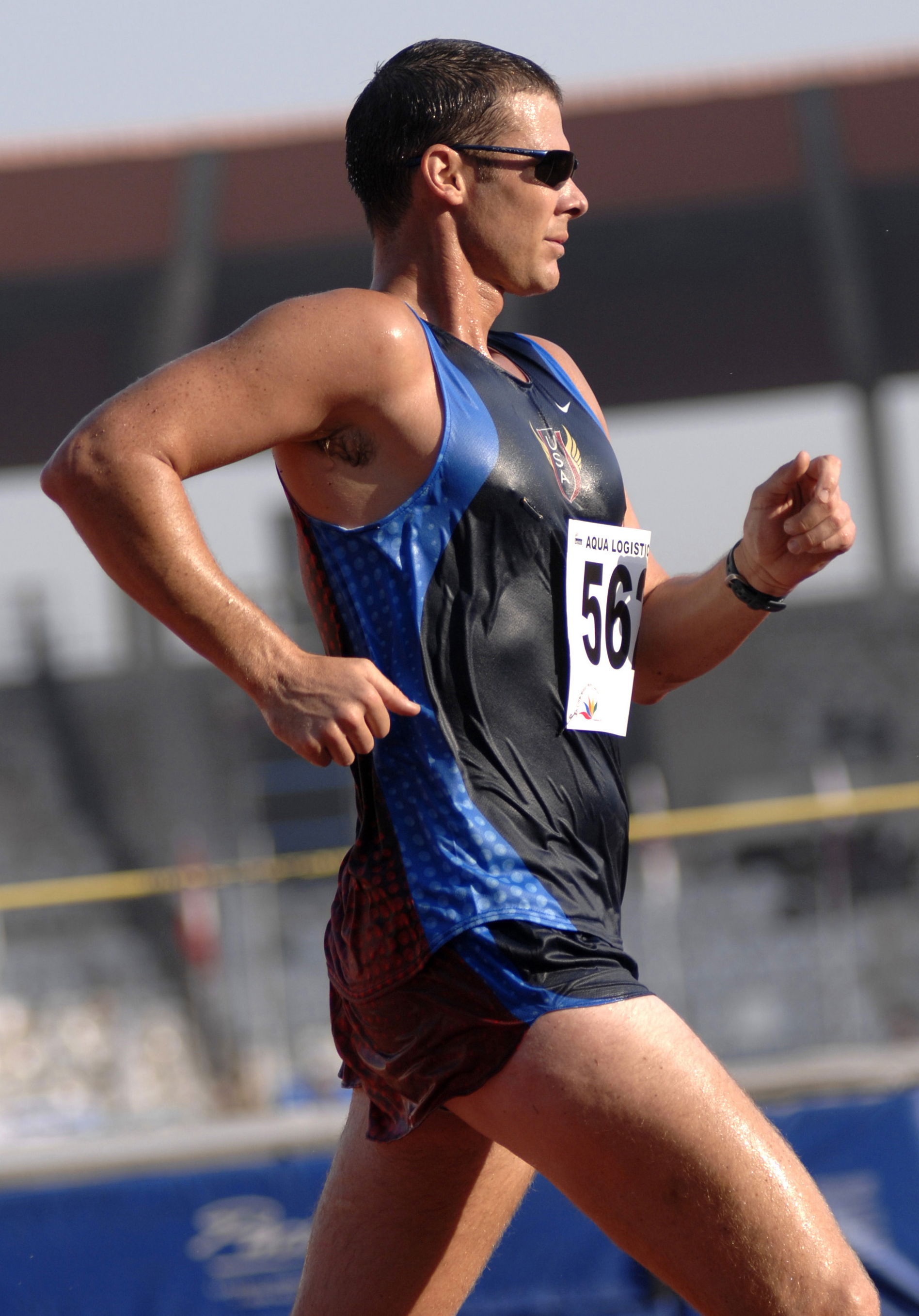
American John Nunn competing in the 20,000 m race walk

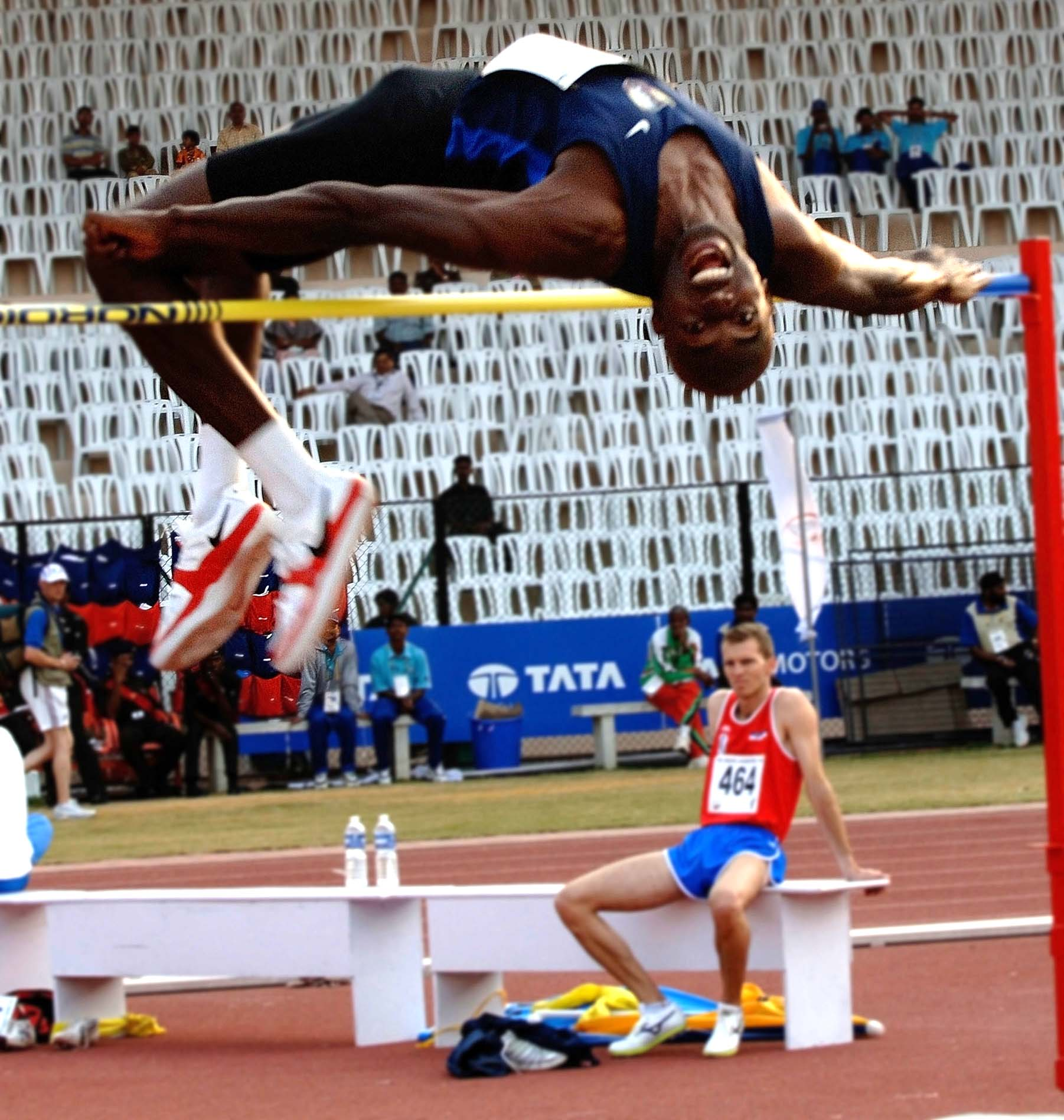
Gregory Roberts in the high jump competition

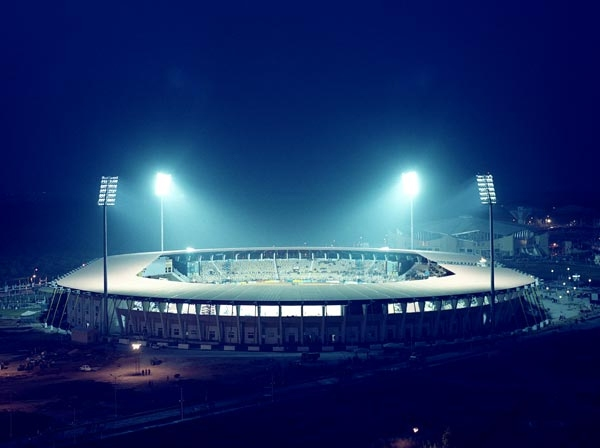
The events were hosted in the GMC Stadium in Hyderabad.

* Host nation (India)

Rank	Nation	Gold	Silver	Bronze	Total
1	Kenya	5	5	2	12
2	Russia	4	7	0	11
3	Poland	4	4	3	11
4	China	4	0	1	5
4	Saudi Arabia	4	0	1	5
6	Ukraine	3	0	3	6
7	Slovenia	3	0	0	3
8	Italy	2	4	3	9
9	Qatar	1	2	2	5
10	Sudan	1	1	1	3
11	Morocco	1	1	0	2
12	Germany	1	0	3	4
13	Greece	1	0	1	2
13	Sri Lanka	1	0	1	2
15	Romania	1	0	0	1
16	Belarus	0	2	2	4
17	Bahrain	0	1	3	4
18	Uzbekistan	0	1	1	2
19	Austria	0	1	0	1
19	Brazil	0	1	0	1
19	Bulgaria	0	1	0	1
19	Finland	0	1	0	1
19	Hungary	0	1	0	1
19	Switzerland	0	1	0	1
19	United States	0	1	0	1
26	India*	0	0	2	2
27	Algeria	0	0	1	1
27	France	0	0	1	1
27	Latvia	0	0	1	1
27	Lithuania	0	0	1	1
27	Netherlands	0	0	1	1
27	Slovakia	0	0	1	1
27	United Arab Emirates	0	0	1	1
Totals (33 entries)		36	35	36	107
