= 2004 IAAF World Indoor Championships – Men's high jump =

The Men's high jump event at the 2004 IAAF World Indoor Championships was held on March 5–6.

== Medalists ==
Gold	Silver	Bronze
Stefan Holm Sweden	Yaroslav Rybakov Russia	Stefan Vasilache Romania; Germaine Mason Jamaica; Jaroslav Bába Czech Republic

== Results ==
=== Qualification ===
Qualification: Qualification Performance 2.30 (Q) or at least 8 best performers advanced to the final.

Rank	Athlete	Nationality	2.15	2.20	2.24	2.27	Result	Notes
1	Stefan Holm	Sweden	–	o	o	o	2.27	q
1	Yaroslav Rybakov	Russia	–	o	o	o	2.27	q
1	Stefan Vasilache	Romania	o	o	o	o	2.27	q
1	Germaine Mason	Jamaica	–	o	o	o	2.27	q, SB
5	Jaroslav Bába	Czech Republic	o	xo	o	o	2.27	q
5	Hennazdy Maroz	Belarus	o	o	xo	o	2.27	q
7	Jamie Nieto	United States	–	o	x–	xo	2.27	q
8	Andriy Sokolovskyy	Ukraine	–	o	o	xxo	2.27	q
9	Adrian O'Dwyer	Ireland	–	xo	–	xxo	2.27	q
10	László Boros	Hungary	o	o	o	xxx	2.24	PB
10	Oskari Frösén	Finland	o	o	o	xxx	2.24	
12	Sergey Klyugin	Russia	o	xo	o	xxx	2.24	
13	Rožle Prezelj	Slovenia	o	o	xo	xxx	2.24	
14	Tora Harris	United States	o	xo	xo	xxx	2.24	
15	Andrea Bettinelli	Italy	o	xo	xxo	xxx	2.24	SB
16	Tomáš Janku	Czech Republic	o	o	xxx		2.20	
16	Joan Charmant	France	o	o	xxx		2.20	

=== Final ===
Rank	Athlete	Nationality	2.20	2.25	2.29	2.32	2.35	2.41	Result	Notes
1st place, gold medalist(s)	Stefan Holm	Sweden	o	o	o	o	o	xxx	2.35	
2nd place, silver medalist(s)	Yaroslav Rybakov	Russia	o	o	xxo	o	xxx		2.32	SB
3rd place, bronze medalist(s)	Stefan Vasilache	Romania	o	o	xxx				2.25	
3rd place, bronze medalist(s)	Germaine Mason	Jamaica	o	o	–	xx			2.25	
3rd place, bronze medalist(s)	Jaroslav Bába	Czech Republic	o	o	xxx				2.25	
6	Hennazdy Maroz	Belarus	xo	o	xxx				2.25	
7	Andriy Sokolovskyy	Ukraine	o	xo	xxx				2.25	
8	Adrian O'Dwyer	Ireland	o	xxo	xxx				2.25	
9	Jamie Nieto	United States	o	xxx					2.20	
