= 2005 European Athletics Indoor Championships – Men's high jump =

The Men's high jump event at the 2005 European Athletics Indoor Championships was held on March 5–6.

== Medalists ==
Gold	Silver	Bronze
Stefan Holm; Sweden	Yaroslav Rybakov; Russia	Pavel Fomenko; Russia

== Results ==
=== Qualification ===
Qualification: Qualification Performance 2.30 (Q) or at least 8 best performers advanced to the final.

Rank	Group	Athlete	Nationality	2.13	2.18	2.23	2.27	2.30	Result	Notes
1	B	Andrea Bettinelli	Italy	o	o	o	o	o	2.30	Q, PB
1	B	Yaroslav Rybakov	Russia	–	o	o	o	o	2.30	Q
3	A	Pavel Fomenko	Russia	o	o	o	o	xo	2.30	Q
3	A	Stefan Holm	Sweden	–	o	o	o	xo	2.30	Q
5	A	Jaroslav Bába	Czech Republic	–	o	xxo	xxo	xo	2.30	Q
6	B	Svatoslav Ton	Czech Republic	o	o	o	o	xxo	2.30	Q
7	A	Dragutin Topić	Serbia and Montenegro	–	o	xo	xo	xxo	2.30	Q
7	B	Andrey Tereshin	Russia	o	o	o	xxo	xxo	2.30	Q
9	A	Javier Bermejo	Spain	xo	o	o	o	xxx	2.27	PB
10	A	Nicola Ciotti	Italy	o	o	o	xo	xxx	2.27	
10	B	Ben Challenger	Great Britain	o	o	o	xo	xxx	2.27	PB
12	A	Alessandro Talotti	Italy	–	–	x–	xo	xxx	2.27	
13	B	Robert Wolski	Poland	o	o	o	xxo	xxx	2.27	
14	A	Michał Bieniek	Poland	o	–	o	xxx		2.23	
15	B	Andrey Sokolovskiy	Ukraine	–	o	xo	xxx		2.23	
16	B	Tomas Janku	Czech Republic	o	o	xxo	xxx		2.23	
17	A	Stefan Vasilache	Romania	xo	xxo	xxo	xxx		2.23	
18	A	Kyriacos Ioannou	Cyprus	o	o	xxx			2.18	
18	A	Marko Aleksejev	Estonia	o	o	xxx			2.18	
20	B	Linus Thörnblad	Sweden	o	xo	xxx			2.18	
21	B	Rozle Prezelj	Slovenia	o	xxo	xxx			2.18	
22	B	Stéphane Toinon	France	o	xxx				2.13	

=== Final ===
Rank	Athlete	Nationality	2.15	2.20	2.24	2.27	2.30	2.32	2.34	2.36	2.38	2.40	2.42	Result	Notes
1st place, gold medalist(s)	Stefan Holm	Sweden	–	o	o	o	o	o	o	–	xo	xo	xxx	2.40	CR
2nd place, silver medalist(s)	Yaroslav Rybakov	Russia	–	–	o	o	o	o	o	o	xo	xx–	x	2.38	NR
3rd place, bronze medalist(s)	Pavel Fomenko	Russia	o	o	o	o	xxo	xxo	xxx					2.32	PB
4	Jaroslav Bába	Czech Republic	–	o	o	xo	o	xxx						2.30	
5	Dragutin Topić	Serbia and Montenegro	o	–	xxo	–	o	–	xxx					2.30	
6	Andrea Bettinelli	Italy	o	o	o	o	xxo	xxx						2.30	PB
7	Svatoslav Ton	Czech Republic	o	o	xo	xo	xxx							2.27	
8	Andrey Tereshin	Russia	xo	o	xo	xxx								2.24	
