= 2003 European Athletics U23 Championships – Men's high jump =

The men's high jump event at the 2003 European Athletics U23 Championships was held in Bydgoszcz, Poland, at Zawisza Stadion on 18 and 20 July.

== Medalists ==
Gold	Aleksander Waleriańczyk; Poland
Silver	Andrey Tereshin; Russia
Bronze	Wojciech Borysiewicz; Poland

== Results ==
=== Final ===
20 July

Rank	Name	Nationality	Attempts											Result	Notes
Rank	Name	Nationality	2.10	2.15	2.18	2.21	2.23	2.25	2.27	2.29	2.34	2.36	2.39	Result	Notes
1st place, gold medalist(s)	Aleksander Waleriańczyk	Poland	–	o	–	o	–	o	–	o	o	xo	xxx	2.36	CR
2nd place, silver medalist(s)	Andrey Tereshin	Russia	o	o	o	o	o	o	xo	xxx				2.27	
3rd place, bronze medalist(s)	Wojciech Borysiewicz	Poland	o	o	o	o	xo	o	xo	xxx				2.27	
4	Robert Wolski	Poland	–	o	o	o	o	o	xxx					2.25	
5	Eike Onnen	Germany	o	o	o	xxo	o	xxx						2.23	
6	Vladimir Chubsa	Belarus	o	o	xxo	o	xxx							2.21	
7	Mickaël Hanany	France	o	o	o	xo	xxx							2.21	
8	Adrian O'Dwyer	Ireland	o	–	o	xx–	x							2.18	
9	Filippo Campioli	Italy	o	o	xo	xxx								2.18	
10	Peter Horák	Slovakia	o	xxo	xxo	xxx								2.18	
11	Mihail Tomaras	Greece	o	o	x	xx								2.15	
	Andrei Chubsa	Belarus	–	xx–	x									NM	

=== Qualifications ===
18 July
Qualifying 2.23 or 12 best to the Final

==== Group A ====
Rank	Name	Nationality	Result	Notes
1	Aleksander Waleriańczyk	Poland	2.21	q
2	Eike Onnen	Germany	2.21	q
3	Wojciech Borysiewicz	Poland	2.21	q
4	Vladimir Chubsa	Belarus	2.21	q
5	Filippo Campioli	Italy	2.18	q
6	László Boros	Hungary	2.18	
7	Stilianos Kesidis	Greece	2.10	
7	Yoav Shuster	Israel	2.10	
9	Ioannis Stokkos	Cyprus	2.10	
9	Branko Đuričić	Serbia and Montenegro	2.10	
11	Luke Crawley	Great Britain	2.10	
11	Yeoryios Bohtsos	Greece	2.10	

==== Group B ====
Rank	Name	Nationality	Result	Notes
1	Andrei Chubsa	Belarus	2.21	q
2	Adrian O'Dwyer	Ireland	2.21	q
2	Robert Wolski	Poland	2.21	q
4	Andrey Tereshin	Russia	2.21	q
5	Mickaël Hanany	France	2.21	q
6	Mihail Tomaras	Greece	2.18	q
6	Peter Horák	Slovakia	2.18	q
8	Aurelijus Eirošius	Lithuania	2.18	
9	Román Fehér	Hungary	2.18	
10	Jan Titze	Germany	2.15	
11	Lemen Fatty	Spain	2.15	
12	Samson Oni	Great Britain	2.15	
13	Timothy Hubert	Belgium	2.05	

== Participation ==
According to an unofficial count, 25 athletes from 17 countries participated in the event.

- Belarus (2)
- Belgium (1)
- Cyprus (1)
- France (1)
- Germany (2)
- Great Britain (2)
- Greece (3)
- Hungary (2)
- Ireland (1)
- Israel (1)
- Italy (1)
- Lithuania (1)
- Poland (3)
- Russia (1)
- Serbia and Montenegro (1)
- Slovakia (1)
- Spain (1)
