= 2007 World Championships in Athletics – Men's high jump =

The Men's High Jump event at the 2007 World Championships in Athletics took place on August 27, 2007 (qualification), and August 29, 2007 (final), at the Nagai Stadium in Osaka, Japan.

== Medallists ==
Gold	Donald Thomas; Bahamas (BAH)
Silver	Yaroslav Rybakov; Russia (RUS)
Bronze	Kyriakos Ioannou; Cyprus (CYP)

== Records ==
World Record	Javier Sotomayor (CUB)	2.45 m	Salamanca, Spain	27 July 1993
Championship Record	Javier Sotomayor (CUB)	2.40 m	Stuttgart, Germany	22 August 1993

== Results ==
=== Qualification ===
Qualification: 2.29 m (Q) or best 12 performances (q)

Rank	Group	Name	Nationality	2.14	2.19	2.23	2.26	2.29	Result	Notes
1	B	Linus Thörnblad	Sweden	–	o	o	o	o	2.29	Q, SB
2	A	Eike Onnen	Germany	o	o	o	xo	o	2.29	Q
2	A	Andrey Silnov	Russia	o	o	xo	o	o	2.29	Q, SB
4	A	Tomáš Janku	Czech Republic	xo	o	xo	o	o	2.29	Q
5	A	Stefan Holm	Sweden	–	o	o	o	xo	2.29	Q
5	B	Yaroslav Rybakov	Russia	–	o	o	o	xo	2.29	Q
7	B	Jaroslav Bába	Czech Republic	o	o	xo	o	xo	2.29	Q, SB
7	B	Víctor Moya	Cuba	–	o	o	xo	xo	2.29	Q
9	B	Martyn Bernard	Great Britain & N.I.	o	o	xo	xo	xo	2.29	Q, PB
10	A	Jessé de Lima	Brazil	o	o	o	o	xxo	2.29	Q, SB
10	B	Donald Thomas	Bahamas	–	o	o	o	xxo	2.29	Q
12	A	Tom Parsons	Great Britain & N.I.	o	o	xo	o	xxo	2.29	Q, PB
12	A	Kabelo Kgosiemang	Botswana	o	o	o	xo	xxo	2.29	Q, SB
14	A	Michał Bieniek	Poland	o	o	xo	xo	xxo	2.29	Q
14	B	Kyriakos Ioannou	Cyprus	o	xo	o	xo	xxo	2.29	Q
16	A	Andrea Bettinelli	Italy	o	o	o	o	xxx	2.26	
16	B	Nicola Ciotti	Italy	o	o	o	o	xxx	2.26	
16	B	Jamie Nieto	United States	–	o	o	o	xxx	2.26	
19	A	Rožle Prezelj	Slovenia	o	o	o	xxo	xxx	2.26	
19	B	Svatoslav Ton	Czech Republic	o	o	o	xxo	xxx	2.26	
21	A	Oskari Frösén	Finland	–	xo	o	xxo	xxx	2.26	
21	A	Yuriy Krymarenko	Ukraine	o	xo	o	xxo	xxx	2.26	
23	A	Peter Horák	Slovakia	o	o	o	xxx		2.23	
24	A	Andrey Tereshin	Russia	o	xo	o	xxx		2.23	
25	B	Dmytro Dem'yanyuk	Ukraine	xxo	o	o	xxx		2.23	
26	A	Jesse Williams	United States	o	o	xo	xxx		2.23	
27	A	Niki Palli	Israel	o	o	xxx			2.19	
27	B	Germaine Mason	Great Britain & N.I.	–	o	xxx			2.19	
27	B	Aleksander Waleriańczyk	Poland	o	o	xxx			2.19	
30	A	Naoyuki Daigo	Japan	xxo	o	xxx			2.19	
31	A	Huang Haiqiang	China	o	xo	xxx			2.19	
31	B	Dragutin Topić	Serbia	o	xo	x–	xx		2.19	
31	B	Gerardo Martínez	Mexico	o	xo	xxx			2.19	
34	B	Jim Dilling	United States	o	xxo	xxx			2.19	
35	B	Sergey Zasimovich	Kazakhstan	xo	xxo	xxx			2.19	
36	A	Abderrahmane Hammad	Algeria	o	xxx				2.14	
36	B	Javier Bermejo	Spain	o	xxx				2.14	
38	B	James Grayman	Antigua and Barbuda	xxo	xxx				2.14	
	A	William Woodcock	Seychelles	xxx					NM	

=== Final ===
Rank	Name	Nationality	2.16	2.21	2.26	2.30	2.33	2.35	2.37	Result	Notes
1st place, gold medalist(s)	Donald Thomas	Bahamas	–	xo	xo	o	xxo	o	xxx	2.35	=WL, =PB
2nd place, silver medalist(s)	Yaroslav Rybakov	Russia	–	o	o	o	o	xo	xxx	2.35	=WL, PB
3rd place, bronze medalist(s)	Kyriakos Ioannou	Cyprus	o	o	o	xo	xo	xo	xxx	2.35	=WL, NR
4	Stefan Holm	Sweden	–	o	o	o	o	xxx		2.33	
5	Tomáš Janku	Czech Republic	o	o	o	o	xxx			2.30	SB
5	Víctor Moya	Cuba	o	o	o	o	xxx			2.30	
7	Eike Onnen	Germany	o	–	o	x–	xx			2.26	
8	Jaroslav Bába	Czech Republic	o	o	xo	xxx				2.26	
9	Kabelo Kgosiemang	Botswana	xo	o	xxo	xxx				2.26	
10	Tom Parsons	Great Britain & N.I.	o	xxo	xxo	xxx				2.26	
11	Michał Bieniek	Poland	o	o	xxx					2.21	
11	Andrey Silnov	Russia	–	o	xxx					2.21	
13	Jessé de Lima	Brazil	xo	o	xxx					2.21	
14	Martyn Bernard	Great Britain & N.I.	–	xxo	–	–	x–	xx		2.21	
15	Linus Thörnblad	Sweden	o	xxx						2.16	
