= 1998 World Junior Championships in Athletics – Men's high jump =

The Men's high jump event at the 1998 World Junior Championships in Athletics was held in Annecy, France, at Parc des Sports on 30 and 31 July.

== Medalists ==
Gold	Alfredo Deza; Peru
Silver	Yin Xueli; China
Bronze	Aleksandr Veryutin; Belarus

== Results ==
=== Final ===
31 July

Rank	Name	Nationality	Result	Notes
1st place, gold medalist(s)	Alfredo Deza	Peru	2.21	
2nd place, silver medalist(s)	Yin Xueli	China	2.21	
3rd place, bronze medalist(s)	Aleksandr Veryutin	Belarus	2.21	
4	Mike Ponikvar	Canada	2.21	
5	Yaroslav Rybakov	Russia	2.18	
6	Paweł Mankiewicz	Poland	2.15	
7	Naoyuki Daigo	Japan	2.15	
8	Ronald Garlett	Australia	2.10	
8	Martin Lloyd	United Kingdom	2.10	
8	Casper Labuschagne	South Africa	2.10	
8	Nikolay Korostelyov	Russia	2.10	
12	Einar Karl Hjartarson	Iceland	2.10	
12	Vusumzi Mtshatseni	South Africa	2.10	
14	James Carr	United States	2.10	

=== Qualifications ===
30 Jul

==== Group A ====
Rank	Name	Nationality	Result	Notes
1	Nikolay Korostelyov	Russia	2.18	Q
2	Mike Ponikvar	Canada	2.18	Q
3	Vusumzi Mtshatseni	South Africa	2.14	q
3	James Carr	United States	2.14	q
5	Alfredo Deza	Peru	2.14	q
6	Aleksey Gordienko	Ukraine	2.10	
7	Kim Jin-soo	South Korea	2.10	
8	Andrei Mikhalkovich	Belarus	2.10	
8	Jérome Tourre	France	2.10	
10	Marko Aleksejev	Estonia	2.10	
11	Ed Willers	United Kingdom	2.05	
11	Rožle Prezelj	Slovenia	2.05	
13	Darrel Muzyczka	Australia	2.05	
13	Paweł Gulcz	Poland	2.05	
15	Kabelo Mmono	Botswana	1.95	

==== Group B ====
Rank	Name	Nationality	Result	Notes
1	Naoyuki Daigo	Japan	2.18	Q
2	Paweł Mankiewicz	Poland	2.18	Q
3	Einar Karl Hjartarson	Iceland	2.18	Q
4	Aleksandr Veryutin	Belarus	2.14	q
4	Yin Xueli	China	2.14	q
6	Ronald Garlett	Australia	2.14	q
7	Martin Lloyd	United Kingdom	2.14	q
7	Casper Labuschagne	South Africa	2.14	q
7	Yaroslav Rybakov	Russia	2.14	q
10	Hannes Zumsande	Germany	2.10	
11	Lamar Johnson	United States	2.10	
12	Tarmo Kobin	Estonia	2.05	
13	Grégory Gabella	France	2.05	
14	Randy Cheddesingh	Canada	2.05	
15	Sergei Seipuk	Lithuania	2.00	

== Participation ==
According to an unofficial count, 30 athletes from 20 countries participated in the event.

- Australia (2)
- Belarus (2)
- Botswana (1)
- Canada (2)
- China (1)
- Estonia (2)
- France (2)
- Germany (1)
- Iceland (1)
- Japan (1)
- Lithuania (1)
- Peru (1)
- Poland (2)
- Russia (2)
- Slovenia (1)
- South Africa (2)
- South Korea (1)
- Ukraine (1)
- United Kingdom (2)
- United States (2)
