= 2006 IAAF World Indoor Championships – Men's high jump =

The Men's high jump event at the 2006 IAAF World Indoor Championships was held on March 10–11.

== Medalists ==
Gold	Silver	Bronze
Yaroslav Rybakov; Russia	Andrey Tereshin; Russia	Linus Thörnblad; Sweden

== Results ==
=== Qualification ===
Qualification: Qualification Performance 2.30 (Q) or at least 8 best performers advanced to the final.

Rank	Athlete	Nationality	2.15	2.20	2.24	2.27	Result	Notes
1	Yaroslav Rybakov	Russia	o	o	o	o	2.27	q
1	Andriy Sokolovskyy	Ukraine	o	o	o	o	2.27	q
1	Stefan Holm	Sweden	o	o	o	o	2.27	q
1	Andrey Tereshin	Russia	o	o	o	o	2.27	q
1	Víctor Moya	Cuba	o	o	o	o	2.27	q, PB
1	Linus Thörnblad	Sweden	o	o	o	o	2.27	q
7	Giulio Ciotti	Italy	o	o	o	xxx	2.24	q
8	Robert Wolski	Poland	xo	o	o	xxx	2.24	q
9	Ramsay Carelse	South Africa	xo	xo	o	xxx	2.24	
10	Tora Harris	United States	o	o	xo	xxx	2.24	
10	Nicola Ciotti	Italy	o	o	xo	xxx	2.24	
10	Wojciech Theiner	Poland	o	o	xo	xxx	2.24	
13	Tomáš Janku	Czech Republic	o	o	xxo	xxx	2.24	
13	Mustapha Raifak	France	o	o	xxo	xxx	2.24	
15	Svatoslav Ton	Czech Republic	o	xo	xxx		2.20	
16	Adam Shunk	United States	o	xxx			2.15	
16	Roman Fricke	Germany	o	xxx			2.15	

=== Final ===
Rank	Athlete	Nationality	2.18	2.22	2.26	2.30	2.33	2.35	2.37	2.39	2.41	Result	Notes
1st place, gold medalist(s)	Yaroslav Rybakov	Russia	–	o	o	o	o	o	xo	–	xxx	2.37	WL
2nd place, silver medalist(s)	Andrey Tereshin	Russia	o	o	o	o	xo	xxo	x–	xx		2.35	
3rd place, bronze medalist(s)	Linus Thörnblad	Sweden	o	o	o	o	o	xxx				2.33	
4	Víctor Moya	Cuba	o	o	o	o	x–	xx				2.30	PB
5	Stefan Holm	Sweden	o	o	xo	xxo	x–	xx				2.30	SB
6	Andriy Sokolovskyy	Ukraine	o	o	o	xxx						2.26	
7	Giulio Ciotti	Italy	xo	xo	xo	xxx						2.26	
8	Robert Wolski	Poland	xxo	o	xxx							2.22	
