= 2009 World Championships in Athletics – Men's high jump =

The men's high jump event at the 2009 World Championships in Berlin, Germany was held between 19 August and 21 August 2009.

The 2008 Olympic gold and silver medallists, Andrey Silnov and Germaine Mason, did not compete at the Championships and the reigning world champion, Donald Thomas had been in poor form that season. The Russian duo, Yaroslav Rybakov and world leader Ivan Ukhov, were the most favoured athletes. The 2005 world champion Yuriy Krymarenko and Olympic medallist Kyriakos Ioannou had performed sub-par prior to the competition. Andrey Tereshin, Jaroslav Bába and host representative Raúl Spank rounded out the likely medal candidates. In the qualification round, the two past champions (Thomas and Krymarenko) failed to make the qualifying mark of 2.30 m. All the favourites progressed, with Kyriakos Ioannou topping the rankings, while Mickael Hanany and Motswana Kabelo Kgosiemang jumped season's best to make the final.

The final, held on 21 August, was delayed by 90 minutes due to heavy rainfall in Berlin, and this produced much lower results compared to the qualification for a majority of the jumpers. No medalling athlete reached the qualifying mark of 2.30 m that they had two days previously. Ivan Ukhov, who had a season's best of 2.40 m, finished with a best of 2.23 m, and Andra Manson similarly failed to match expectations. Only Rybakov, Ioannou, Spank and Sylwester Bednarek passed the 2.28 m height. Rybakov and Ioannou passed 2.32 m on their first attempts, while the other two athletes took two jumps for the height which were personal bests. These turned out to be the final passes of the competition and Rybakov beat Ioannou to the gold by having one less failed attempt in the competition, while Spank and Bednarek shared the bronze honours.

This was Rybakov's first gold after three silvers in past world championships. Ioannou was Cyprus' only medallist from the championships that year. Joint-third Bednarek was a surprise medallist given that this was his first senior outdoor competition and he had started the season with a best of 2.26 m. The winning result of 2.32 m was the lowest winning result in the history of high jumping finals in the World Championships in Athletics, shared with the finals of 1983 and 2005.

== Medalists ==
Gold	Yaroslav Rybakov; Russia (RUS)
Silver	Kyriakos Ioannou; Cyprus (CYP)
Bronze	Sylwester Bednarek; Poland (POL) Raúl Spank; Germany (GER)

== Records ==
World record	Javier Sotomayor (CUB)	2.45	Salamanca, Spain	27 July 1993
Championship record	Javier Sotomayor (CUB)	2.40	Stuttgart, Germany	22 August 1993
World Leading	Andra Manson (USA)	2.35	Austin, United States	4 April 2009
African record	Jacques Freitag (RSA)	2.38	Oudtshoorn, South Africa	5 March 2005
Asian record	Zhu Jianhua (CHN)	2.39	Eberstadt, West Germany	10 June 1984
North American record	Javier Sotomayor (CUB)	2.45	Salamanca, Spain	27 July 1993
South American record	Gilmar Mayo (COL)	2.33	Pereira, Colombia	17 October 1994
European record	Patrik Sjöberg (SWE)	2.42	Stockholm, Sweden	30 June 1987
Oceanian record	Tim Forsyth (AUS)	2.36	Melbourne, Australia	2 March 1997

== Qualification standards ==
A standard	B standard
2.31m	2.28m

== Schedule ==
Date	Time	Round
August 19, 2009	11:10	Qualification
August 21, 2009	19:15	Final

== Results ==
=== Qualification ===
Qualification: Qualifying Performance 2.30 (Q) or at least 12 best performers (q) advance to the final.

Rank	Group	Name	Nationality	2.10	2.15	2.20	2.24	2.27	2.30	Result	Notes
1	A	Kyriakos Ioannou	Cyprus	-	o	o	xxo	o	o	2.30	Q, SB
2	B	Linus Thörnblad	Sweden	-	o	o	o	o	xo	2.30	Q
3	A	Kabelo Kgosiemang	Botswana	-	o	o	o	xo	xo	2.30	Q, SB
4	B	Raúl Spank	Germany	-	-	o	xo	xxo	xo	2.30	Q
5	B	Andra Manson	United States	-	o	o	xxo	xxo	xo	2.30	Q
6	A	Yaroslav Rybakov	Russia	-	-	o	o	o	xxo	2.30	Q
6	B	Ivan Ukhov	Russia	-	o	o	o	o	xxo	2.30	Q
8	B	Mickaël Hanany	France	-	o	o	xxo	o	xxo	2.30	Q, SB
9	A	Giulio Ciotti	Italy	-	o	o	o	o	xxx	2.27	q
9	A	Martijn Nuyens	Netherlands	o	o	o	o	o	xxx	2.27	q
9	A	Keith Moffatt	United States	-	o	o	o	o	xxx	2.27	q
12	A	Jaroslav Bába	Czech Republic	-	-	o	xo	o	xxx	2.27	q
12	B	Sylwester Bednarek	Poland	o	xo	o	o	o	xxx	2.27	q
14	B	Jessé de Lima	Brazil	-	o	o	xxo	o	xxx	2.27	
15	B	Donald Thomas	Bahamas	o	o	o	o	xo	xxx	2.27	
16	A	Konstadínos Baniótis	Greece	-	o	o	o	xxx		2.24	
17	A	Trevor Barry	Bahamas	-	xo	o	o	xxx		2.24	
18	A	Andrey Tereshin	Russia	-	o	o	xo	xxx		2.24	
18	B	Yuriy Krymarenko	Ukraine	o	o	o	xo	xxx		2.24	
20	B	Oskari Frösén	Finland	-	o	-	xxo	xx-	x	2.24	
21	A	Tora Harris	United States	-	o	xxo	xxo	x-	xx	2.24	
22	B	Javier Bermejo	Spain	o	o	o	xx-	x		2.20	
22	B	Naoyuki Daigo	Japan	-	o	o	xxx			2.20	
22	B	Viktor Shapoval	Ukraine	o	o	o	xxx			2.20	
25	A	Andriy Protsenko	Ukraine	o	xo	o	xxx			2.20	
26	A	Grzegorz Sposób	Poland	o	o	xo	xxx			2.20	
27	B	Peter Horák	Slovakia	o	o	xxo	xxx			2.20	
28	B	Artsiom Zaitsau	Belarus	-	o	xx				2.15	
28	B	Majed Aldin Gazal	Syria	o	o	xxx				2.15	SB
30	A	Dragutin Topić	Serbia	-	xxo	xxx				2.15	
	A	Sergey Zasimovich	Kazakhstan							DNS	

Key: Q = qualification by place in heat, q = qualification by overall place, SB = Seasonal best

=== Final ===
Rank	Name	Nationality	2.18	2.23	2.28	2.32	2.35	Result	Notes
1st place, gold medalist(s)	Yaroslav Rybakov	Russia	o	o	xo	o	xxx	2.32	
2nd place, silver medalist(s)	Kyriakos Ioannou	Cyprus	o	o	xxo	o	xxx	2.32	SB
3rd place, bronze medalist(s)	Sylwester Bednarek	Poland	xo	o	xo	xo	xxx	2.32	PB
3rd place, bronze medalist(s)	Raúl Spank	Germany	o	o	xxo	xo	xxx	2.32	PB
5	Jaroslav Bába	Czech Republic	o	o	xxx			2.23	
5	Mickaël Hanany	France	o	o	xxx			2.23	
5	Martijn Nuyens	Netherlands	o	o	xxx			2.23	
5	Linus Thörnblad	Sweden	o	o	xxx			2.23	
9	Andra Manson	United States	xo	o	xxx			2.23	
10	Ivan Ukhov	Russia	o	xo	xxx			2.23	
11	Giulio Ciotti	Italy	xo	xxo	xxx			2.23	
11	Keith Moffatt	United States	xo	xxo	xxx			2.23	
13	Kabelo Kgosiemang	Botswana	xxo	xxx				2.18	

Key: PB = Personal best, SB = Seasonal best
