= Kyriakos Ioannou =

Cypriot high jumper (born 1984)

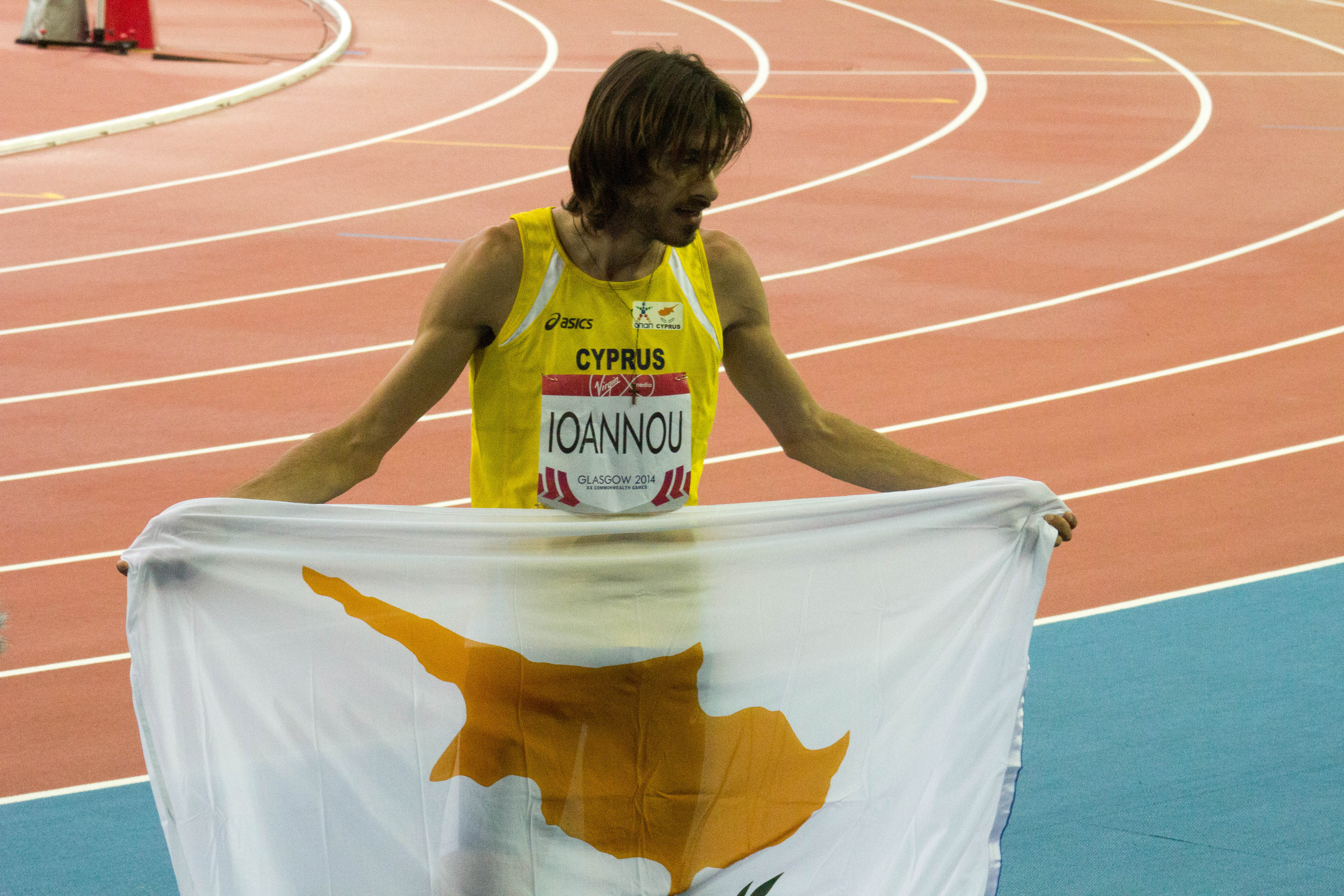

Personal information
- Born: 26 July 1984 (age 42) Limassol, Cyprus
- Height: 1.93 m (6 ft 4 in)
- Weight: 66 kg (146 lb)

Sport
- Country: Cyprus
- Event: High jump

Achievements and titles
- Personal bests: 2.35 m 2.32 m (indoors)
Medal record
World Championships
Silver medal – second place	2009 Berlin	High jump
Bronze medal – third place	2007 Osaka	High jump
World Indoor Championships
Bronze medal – third place	2008 Valencia	High jump
European Indoor Championships
Silver medal – second place	2009 Turin	High jump
Commonwealth Games
Silver medal – second place	2014 Glasgow	High jump
Bronze medal – third place	2006 Melbourne	High jump
Mediterranean Games
Gold medal – first place	2005 Almera	High jump
Gold medal – first place	2009 Pescara	High jump
Universiade
Silver medal – second place	2007 Bangkok	High jump

Kyriakos Ioannou (Greek: Κυριάκος Ιωάννου, born 26 July 1984) is a retired Cypriot high jumper. He has twice won medals at the World Athletics Championships (2007 and 2009) and was the bronze medallist at the 2008 IAAF World Indoor Championships. He is the only medalist for Cyprus at the World Athletics Championships since its creation in 1983. He's also the Cypriot record holder in the high jump, both outdoors (2.35 m) and indoors (2.32 m). Ioannou is a two-time medallist at the Commonwealth Games (2006 and 2014) and took back-to-back gold medals at the Mediterranean Games in 2005 and 2009.

== Career ==
His personal best jump and Cypriot national record is 2.35 metres, achieved at the 2007 World Championships held in Osaka where he won the bronze medal. He became the first World Championships medalist from Cyprus. Two years later, at the 2009 World Championships in Berlin, he won the silver medal (2,32 m), only beaten by Yaroslav Rybakov. He also took the bronze medal at the 2008 World Indoor Championships and finished fourth two years later at the same competition in Doha.

His best jump in 2010, came at Lausanne Diamond League on July 8, when he took third place with a jump of 2.30. Ioannou began his outdoor season at the first 2011 IAAF Diamond League meet in Doha and set a joint meeting record of 2.33m alongside American Jesse Williams, though Williams was declared the winner on countback.

Due to an injury, he didn't start in the qualifying rounds at the 2011 World Championships in Daegu where he was one of the favourites for a medal.

In 2012, still injured, he arrived to qualifying to the Olympic final in London where he finished 12th with 2.20 m. The following year, he didn't compete. Ioannou competed at the 2014 Commonwealth Games, winning the silver medal with a SB of 2.28 m. Derek Drouin of Canada took gold (2.31 m).

In March 2015, Ioannou made the final of the European Indoor Athletics Championships but didn't arrive to make any jump due to an injury. In June, he obtained the Olympic standard by clearing 2.29 m.

In February 2016, for his first competition of the year, Ioannou equalled his own indoor national record from 2008 (and equalled by Dimitrios Chondrokoukis in 2015) by clearing 2.32 m in Hustopeče on his third attempt.

== International competitions ==
Year	Competition	Venue	Position	Notes
Representing Cyprus
2001	World Youth Championships	Debrecen, Hungary	29th (q)	1.90 m
2002	World Junior Championships	Kingston, Jamaica	18th (q)	2.12 m
2003	European Junior Championships	Tampere, Finland	6th	2.15 m
2003	Military World Games	Catania, Italy	3rd	2.15 m
2004	Olympic Games	Athens, Greece	19th (q)	2.25 m
2005	European Indoor Championships	Madrid, Spain	18th (q)	2.18 m
2005	Games of the Small States of Europe	Andorra la Vella, Andorra	1st	2.18 m
2005	Mediterranean Games	Almería, Spain	1st	2.24 m
2005	European U23 Championships	Erfurt, Germany	4th	2.27 m
2005	World Championships	Helsinki, Finland	10th	2.25 m
2006	Commonwealth Games	Melbourne, Australia	3rd	2.23 m
2007	World Championships	Osaka, Japan	3rd	2.35 m (NR)
2007	Universiade	Bangkok, Thailand	2nd	2.26 m
2008	World Indoor Championships	Valencia, Spain	3rd	2.30 m
2008	Olympic Games	Beijing, China	18th (q)	2.25 m
2009	European Indoor Championships	Turin, Italy	2nd	2.29 m
2009	Games of the Small States of Europe	Nicosia, Cyprus	1st	2.25 m
2009	Mediterranean Games	Pescara, Italy	1st	2.30 m
2009	World Championships	Berlin, Germany	2nd	2.32 m
2009	World Athletics Final	Thessaloniki, Greece	7th	2.22 m
2010	World Indoor Championships	Doha, Qatar	4th	2.28 m
2012	European Championships	Helsinki, Finland	21st (q)	2.15 m
2012	Olympic Games	London, United Kingdom	13th	2.20 m
2014	Commonwealth Games	Glasgow, United Kingdom	2nd	2.28 m
2015	European Indoor Championships	Prague, Czech Republic	7th (q)	2.28 m^{1}
2016	European Championships	Amsterdam, Netherlands	10th (q)	2.25 m^{1}
2016	Olympic Games	Rio de Janeiro, Brazil	7th	2.29 m
2019	Games of the Small States of Europe	Bar, Montenegro	2nd	2.09 m

^{1}No mark in the final

Sporting positions
Preceded by Andrey Silnov	Men's High Jump Best Year Performance alongside Donald Thomas, Yaroslav Rybakov and Stefan Holm; 2007	Succeeded by Andrey Silnov
