= Athletics at the 2008 Summer Olympics – Men's high jump =

Men's high jump at the Games of the XXIX Olympiad
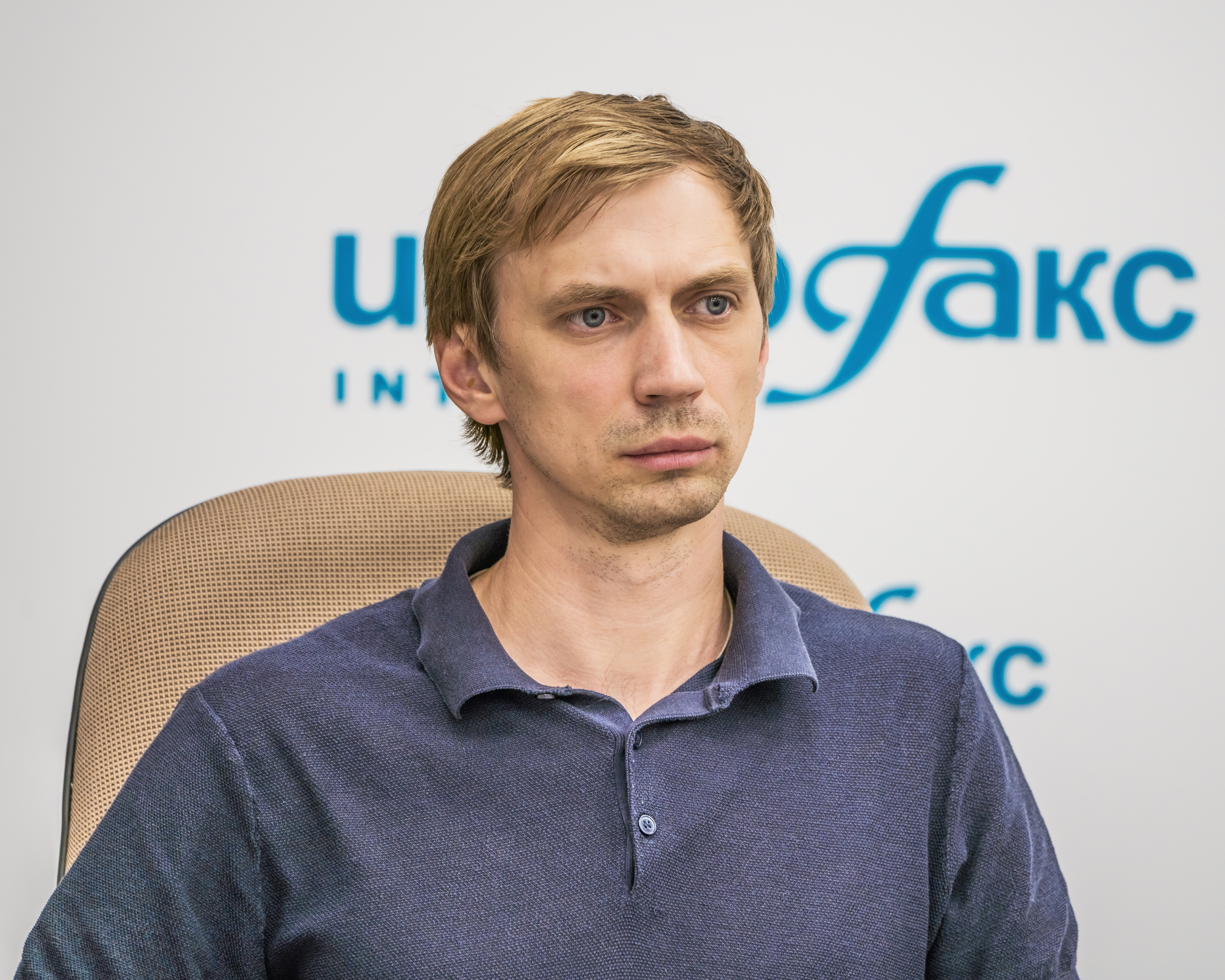
- Andrey Silnov (2018)
- Venue: Beijing Olympic Stadium
- Dates: 17 August 2008 (qualifying); 19 August 2008 (final)
- Competitors: 40 from 28 nations
- Winning height: 2.36

Medalists
1st place, gold medalist(s)		Andrey Silnov; Russia
2nd place, silver medalist(s)		Germaine Mason; Great Britain
3rd place, bronze medalist(s)		Yaroslav Rybakov; Russia

The men's high jump at the 2008 Olympic Games took place on 17–19 August at the Beijing Olympic Stadium. Forty athletes from 28 nations competed. The event was won by Andrey Silnov of Russia, the nation's second victory (after 2000) in the men's high jump. Germaine Mason's silver was Great Britain's first medal in the event since 1996, and matched the nation's best-ever result. Silnov's countryman Yaroslav Rybakov won bronze, marking the first time since 1988 that a nation had two medalists in the men's high jump in the same Games. Reigning world champion Donald Thomas, who cleared 2.32 metres at Osaka 2007, finished in twenty-first place and failed to advance into the final round. For the first time (other than the boycotted 1980 Games), no American made the final.

In June 2019, Silnov faced doping charges. His doping ban was confirmed by the Court of Arbitration for Sport on 7 April 2021 when he was banned for four years with all of his results from 8 July 2013 disqualified. In 2023, Silnov was seen awarding athletes at a Russian domestic competition for which the World Anti-Doping Agency extended his ban for a further year.

== Background ==
This was the 26th appearance of the event, which is one of 12 athletics events to have been held at every Summer Olympics. The returning finalists from the 2004 Games were gold medalist (and 2000 fourth-place finisher) Stefan Holm of Sweden, bronze medalist Jaroslav Bába of the Czech Republic, sixth-place finisher Yaroslav Rybakov and ninth-place finisher Vyacheslav Voronin of Russia (the latter of whom had also been a finalist in 2000), tenth-place finisher Dragutin Topić of Serbia (now in his fifth Games under his fourth flag: Independent Olympic Participant in 1992, Yugoslavia in 1996 and 2000, Serbia and Montenegro in 2004), and twelfth-place finisher Alessandro Talotti of Italy.

Antigua and Barbuda, Botswana, Mexico, Serbia, and Slovakia each made their debut in the event. The United States made its 25th appearance, most of any nation, having missed only the boycotted 1980 Games.

== Qualification ==
The qualifying standards were 2.30 m (7.55 ft) (A standard) and 2.27 m (7.45 ft) (B standard). Each National Olympic Committee (NOC) was able to enter up to three entrants providing they had met the A standard in the qualifying period (1 January 2007 to 23 July 2008). NOCs were also permitted to enter one athlete providing he had met the B standard in the same qualifying period. The maximum number of athletes per nation had been set at 3 since the 1930 Olympic Congress.

== Competition format ==
The competition used the two-round format introduced in 1912. There were two distinct rounds of jumping with results cleared between rounds. Jumpers were eliminated if they had three consecutive failures, whether at a single height or between multiple heights if they attempted to advance before clearing a height.

The qualifying round had the bar set at 2.10 metres, 2.15 metres, 2.20 metres, 2.25 metres, and 2.29 metres. All jumpers clearing 2.29 metres in the qualifying round advanced to the final. If fewer than 12 jumpers could achieve it, the top 12 (including ties, though for the first time the countback rules would be applied to narrow the ties) would advance to the final.

The final had jumps at 2.15 metres, 2.20 metres, 2.25 metres, 2.29 metres, 2.32 metres, 2.34 metres, and 2.36 metres; the winner also took attempts at 2.42 metres.

== Records ==
Prior to this competition, the existing world record, Olympic record, and world leading jumps were as follows:

World record	Javier Sotomayor (CUB)	2.45	Salamanca, Spain	27 July 1993
Olympic record	Charles Austin (USA)	2.39	Atlanta, United States	27 July 1996
World Leading	Yaroslav Rybakov (RUS); Andrey Silnov (RUS)	2.38	Moscow, Russia; London, United Kingdom	10 February 2008; 25 July 2008

No new world or Olympic records were set for this event.

== Schedule ==
All times are China Standard Time (UTC+8)

Date	Time	Round
Sunday, 17 August 2008	20:20	Qualifying
Tuesday, 19 August 2008	19:10	Final

== Results ==
Key

- o = Height cleared
- x = Height failed
- – = Height passed
- r = Retired
- SB = Season's best
- PB = Personal best
- NR = National record
- AR = Area record
- OR = Olympic record
- WR = World record
- WL = World lead
- NM = No mark
- DNS = Did not start
- DQ = Disqualified

=== Qualifying round ===
Qualification Criteria: Qualifying Performance 2.32 (Q) or at least 12 best performers (q) advance to the final. Because only 8 jumpers cleared 2.29 metres, nobody took any attempts at 2.32 metres. In prior Games, the top 12 including all ties for a given height would advance; this time, the countback rules applied and only some of the jumpers clearing 2.25 metres advanced. The qualification rule, in effect, became "cleared 2.29 metres, or cleared 2.25 metres on the first attempt with no more than one miss before that." Thus, Parson—who cleared 2.25 metres on the first attempt and had one miss at 2.20 metres—advanced in 12th place while Manson—who also cleared 2.25 metres on the first attempt and had one miss at 2.20 metres, but had also had a miss at 2.15 metres—was eliminated in 13th place. (The prior rules would have led to a 20-man final in Beijing.)

Rank	Group	Athlete	Nation	2.10	2.15	2.20	2.25	2.29	Height	Notes
1	A	Jaroslav Bába	Czech Republic	—	o	o	o	o	2.29	q
1	B	Jessé de Lima	Brazil	—	o	o	o	o	2.29	q
1	B	Tomáš Janků	Czech Republic	o	o	o	o	o	2.29	q
1	A	Germaine Mason	Great Britain	—	o	o	o	o	2.29	q
5	A	Raúl Spank	Germany	—	o	o	xo	o	2.29	q
6	B	Martyn Bernard	Great Britain	—	o	o	o	xo	2.29	q
6	A	Stefan Holm	Sweden	—	o	o	o	xo	2.29	q
6	B	Andrey Silnov	Russia	—	o	o	o	xo	2.29	q
9	B	Filippo Campioli	Italy	o	o	o	o	xxx	2.25	q
9	A	Rožle Prezelj	Slovenia	—	o	o	o	xxx	2.25	q
9	A	Yaroslav Rybakov	Russia	—	o	o	o	xxx	2.25	q
12	B	Tom Parsons	Great Britain	—	o	xo	o	xxx	2.25	q
13	A	Andra Manson	United States	—	xo	xo	o	xxx	2.25	
14	A	Andrea Bettinelli	Italy	—	o	o	xo	xxx	2.25	
14	A	Mickael Hanany	France	o	o	o	xo	xxx	2.25	
14	A	Vyacheslav Voronin	Russia	—	o	o	xo	xxx	2.25	
17	A	Dragutin Topić	Serbia	—	o	xo	xo	xxx	2.25	
18	B	Kyriakos Ioannou	Cyprus	—	xo	xo	xo	xxx	2.25	
19	B	Michael Mason	Canada	—	o	o	xxo	xxx	2.25	
19	B	Jesse Williams	United States	—	o	o	xxo	xxx	2.25	
21	B	Dmytro Demyanyuk	Ukraine	o	o	o	xxx	—	2.20	
21	A	Niki Palli	Israel	o	o	o	xxx	—	2.20	
21	A	Donald Thomas	Bahamas	—	o	o	xxx	—	2.20	
24	A	Michał Bieniek	Poland	—	xo	o	xxx	—	2.20	
24	A	Majed Aldin Gazal	Syria	o	xo	o	xxx	—	2.20	=NR
26	A	Dusty Jonas	United States	o	o	xo	xxx	—	2.20	
26	B	Linus Thörnblad	Sweden	—	o	xo	xxx	—	2.20	
28	B	James Grayman	Antigua and Barbuda	xo	xxo	xo	xxx	—	2.20	
29	B	Javier Bermejo	Spain	o	o	xxo	xxx	—	2.20	
29	B	Kabelo Kgosiemang	Botswana	—	o	xxo	xxx	—	2.20	
29	B	Alessandro Talotti	Italy	o	o	xxo	xxx	—	2.20	
32	B	Lee Hup Wei	Malaysia	o	xo	xxo	xxx	—	2.20	
33	A	Peter Horák	Slovakia	o	xo	xxx	—		2.15	
33	B	Yuriy Krymarenko	Ukraine	o	xo	xxx	—		2.15	
33	A	Gerardo Martínez	Mexico	o	xo	xxx	—		2.15	
36	B	Naoyuki Daigo	Japan	xxo	xxo	xxx	—		2.15	
37	A	Konstadínos Baniótis	Greece	xo	xxx	—			2.10	
37	B	Sergey Zasimovich	Kazakhstan	xo	xxx	—			2.10	
39	A	Oleksandr Nartov	Ukraine	xxo	xxx	—			2.10	
—	B	Huang Haiqiang	China	xxx	—				No mark	

=== Final ===
The final was held on August 19.

Rank	Athlete	Nation	2.15	2.20	2.25	2.29	2.32	2.34	2.36	2.42	Height	Notes
1st place, gold medalist(s)	Andrey Silnov	Russia	—	o	o	o	o	o	o	xxx	2.36	
2nd place, silver medalist(s)	Germaine Mason	Great Britain	—	o	o	x–	o	o	xxx	—	2.34	PB
3rd place, bronze medalist(s)	Yaroslav Rybakov	Russia	—	o	o	o	xxo	o	xxx	—	2.34	SB
4	Stefan Holm	Sweden	—	o	o	o	o	x–	xx	—	2.32	
5	Raúl Spank	Germany	o	o	o	o	xxo	xx–	x	—	2.32	PB
6	Jaroslav Bába	Czech Republic	o	o	o	o	x–	x–	x	—	2.29	
7	Tomáš Janků	Czech Republic	o	o	o	xo	x–	xx	—		2.29	
8	Tom Parsons	Great Britain	o	o	o	xxx	—				2.25	
9	Martyn Bernard	Great Britain	o	o	xo	x–	xx	—			2.25	
10	Jessé de Lima	Brazil	o	o	xxx	—					2.20	
10	Filippo Campioli	Italy	—	o	xxx	—					2.20	
12	Rožle Prezelj	Slovenia	o	xxo	xxx	—					2.20	
