= Robert Wolski =

Polish high jumper (1982–2026)

Personal information
- Born: 8 December 1982 Łęczyca, Poland
- Died: 2 January 2026 (aged 43) Łódź, Poland
- Height: 180 cm (5 ft 11 in)

Sport
- Event: High jump
- Club: MKLA Łęczyca; Woodford Green with Essex Ladies

Achievements and titles
- Personal best: 2.31 m

Robert Wolski (8 December 1982 – 2 January 2026) was a Polish high jumper.

== Biography ==
Wolski was born in Łęczyca on 8 December 1982. As ann U20 competitor, his personal best jump was 2.15 metres, which he achieved in May 2001 in his hometown. The next year he jumped 2.22 metres to become Polish U23 champion in Kraków. In 2003, he took the silver medal at the Polish Indoor Championships, won the Polish University Championships, finished fourth at the Polish Championships and fourth at the 2003 European U23 Championships on home soil in Bydgoszcz. On the three latter occasions, he achieved 2.25 metres every time.

Following another silver at the 2004 Polish Indoor Championships, Wolski took his first national title in July 2004, clearing 2.30 metres in Bydgoszcz. He repeated this result two weeks later at the Eberstadt Internationales Hochsprung-Meeting, but at the 2004 Olympics, he failed to qualify from his pool.

2005 only saw him clearing 2.27 metres, at the 2005 European Indoor Championships where he again failed to reach the final, and he later only finished sixth at the Polish Championships. A gold medal in 2.28 metres at the 2006 Polish Indoor Championships was immediately followed by an eighth-place finish at the 2006 World Indoor Championships in Moscow. During the 2006 outdoors season, he only jumped 2.14 at the Polish Championships to record a fourth place, but bounced back in September to set a lifetime best of 2.31 metres in Wrocław.

Wolski, who started his club career in MKLA Łęczyca, relocated to England in 2010 and joined the Woodford Green with Essex Ladies. He won the World Masters Indoor Athletics Championships in his age class in 2019.

Wolski was involved in a major traffic collision in Bocheń on 26 December 2025. He was taken to hospital in Łódź in critical condition, but died from his injuries on 2 January 2026, at the age of 43.
