= Gerardo Martínez (athlete) =

Mexican high jumper

Personal information
- Born: 14 November 1979 (age 46) La Paz, Baja California Sur, Mexico

Sport
- Sport: Track and field
Medal record
Representing Mexico
Central American and Caribbean Games
Gold medal – first place	2002 San Salvador	High jump
Bronze medal – third place	2006 Cartagena	High jump

Gerardo Eugenio Martínez Dibene (born 14 November 1979) is a Mexican high jumper. His personal best jump is 2.30 metres, achieved in April 2007 in Walnut. This is the current Mexican record.

Martínez won the gold medal at the 2002 Central American and Caribbean Games and the bronze medal at the 2006 Central American and Caribbean Games. He finished fifth at the 2005 Summer Universiade and at the 2007 Pan American Games. He also competed at the 2007 World Championships without reaching the final.

== Competition record ==
Year	Competition	Venue	Position	Event	Notes
Representing Mexico
2000	NACAC U-25 Championships	Monterrey, Mexico	3rd	Triple jump	15.43 m w (wind: +3.7 m/s)
2002	Ibero-American Championships	Guatemala City, Guatemala	8th	High jump	2.14 m
2002	NACAC U-25 Championships	San Antonio, United States	9th	High jump	2.05 m
2002	Central American and Caribbean Games	San Salvador, El Salvador	1st	High jump	2.18 m
2004	Ibero-American Championships	Huelva, Spain	7th	High jump	2.15 m
2005	Central American and Caribbean Championships	Nassau, Bahamas	3rd	High jump	2.23 m
2005	Universiade	İzmir, Turkey	5th	High jump	2.23 m
2006	Ibero-American Championships	Ponce, Puerto Rico	3rd	High jump	2.16 m
2006	Central American and Caribbean Games	Cartagena, Colombia	3rd	High jump	2.16 m
2007	NACAC Championships	San Salvador, El Salvador	2nd	High jump	2.21 m
2007	Pan American Games	Rio de Janeiro, Brazil	5th	High jump	2.24 m
2007	World Championships	Osaka, Japan	31st (q)	High jump	2.19 m
2008	World Indoor Championships	Valencia, Spain	15th (q)	High jump	2.15 m
2008	Ibero-American Championships	Iquique, Chile	4th	High jump	2.15 m
2008	Olympic Games	Beijing, China	33rd (q)	High jump	2.15 m
