= 2008 IAAF World Indoor Championships – Men's high jump =

In the men's high jump event at the 2008 IAAF World Indoor Championships, Stefan Holm won the gold medal with a jump of 2.36m.

== Medalists ==
Gold
Stefan Holm	Sweden
Silver
Yaroslav Rybakov	Russia
Bronze
Kyriakos Ioannou	Cyprus
Andra Manson	United States

== Qualification ==
Qualification rule: qualification standard 2.30m or at least best 8 qualified

Pos	Athlete	Country	Mark	Q	Attempts			
Pos	Athlete	Country	Mark	Q	2.15	2.20	2.24	2.27
1	Stefan Holm	Sweden	2.27	q	–	O	O	O
1	Andra Manson	United States	2.27	q	O	O	O	O
3	Víctor Moya	Cuba	2.27	q	O	XO	O	O
4	Kyriakos Ioannou	Cyprus	2.27	q	O	XXO	XO	O
5	Yaroslav Rybakov	Russia	2.27	q	–	O	O	XO
5	Jesse Williams	United States	2.27	q	–	O	O	XO
7	Jaroslav Bába	Czech Republic	2.27	q	O	O	XXO	XO
8	Dragutin Topić	Serbia	2.27	q	O	O	O	XXO
9	Michael Mason	Canada	2.27	q	O	XO	XXO	XXO
10	Dmytro Dem'yanyuk	Ukraine	2.24		O	O	O	XXX
11	Andrey Tereshin	Russia	2.24		O	XO	XXO	XXX
12	Samson Oni	United Kingdom	2.24		XO	XXO	XXO	XXX
13	Sergey Zasimovich	Kazakhstan	2.20		O	O	XXX	
13	Javier Bermejo	Spain	2.20		O	O	XXX	
15	Gerardo Martínez	Mexico	2.15		O	XXX		
15	Filippo Campioli	Italy	2.15		O	XXX		
17	Naoyuki Daigo	Japan	2.15 SB		XO	XXX		

== Final ==
Pos	Athlete	Country	Mark	Attempts								
Pos	Athlete	Country	Mark	2.19	2.23	2.27	2.30	2.32	2.34	2.36	2.38	2.41
Gold medal	Stefan Holm	Sweden	2.36	O	O	O	XXO	O	X-	O	X-	XX
Silver medal	Yaroslav Rybakov	Russia	2.34	–	O	O	O	O	XO	X-	XX	
Bronze medal	Kyriakos Ioannou	Cyprus	2.30	O	XO	O	XXO	XXX				
Bronze medal	Andra Manson	United States	2.30	O	O	XO	XXO	XXX				
5	Víctor Moya	Cuba	2.27	O	O	O	XXX					
6	Jesse Williams	United States	2.27	XO	O	O	XXX					
6	Dragutin Topić	Serbia	2.27	XO	–	O	–	XXX				
8	Michael Mason	Canada	2.27	XO	XXO	O	XXX					
9	Jaroslav Bába	Czech Republic	2.23	O	O	XXX						
