= Nicola Ciotti =

Italian high jumper (born 1976)

Personal information
- Nationality: Italian
- Born: 5 October 1976 (age 49) Rimini, Italy
- Height: 1.87 m (6 ft 1 1/2 in)
- Weight: 78 kg (172 lb)

Sport
- Country: Italy
- Sport: Athletics
- Event: High jump
- Club: C.S. Carabinieri

Achievements and titles
- Personal best: High jump: 2.31 m (2006)
Medal record
European Cup
Silver medal – second place	2005 Florence	High jump

Nicola Ciotti (born 5 October 1976 in Rimini) is an Italian high jumper. He is the twin brother of Giulio Ciotti.

== Biography ==
He finished fifth at the 2005 World Championships and sixth at the 2006 European Championships. He also competed at the European Indoor Championships in 2002, 2005, 2007 and 2009, the World Championships in 2003, 2005 and 2007 as well as the 2004 Olympic Games and the 2006 World Indoor Championships without reaching the final.

Ciotti became Italian high jump champion in 2005, triumphing over Giulio Ciotti, Andrea Bettinelli, and Alessandro Talotti in those efforts. He also became indoor champion in 2002, 2005 and 2006.

His personal best jump is 2.30 metres, achieved in July 2003 in Viersen, and then equalled twice since. He has 2.31 metres on the indoor track, achieved in January 2006 in Hustopeče, at the same competition as his brother jumped the same height for his personal best. On 9 February 2011, almost 35, jumping 2.28 at the meeting in Banská Bystrica, gets the minimum for participation in the 2011 European Athletics Indoor Championships in Paris.

== Achievements ==
Year	Competition	Venue	Position	Notes
2002	European Indoor Championships	Vienna, Austria	24th (q)	2.17 m
2003	World Championships	Paris, France	29th (q)	2.20 m
2004	Olympic Games	Athens, Greece	13th (q)	2.23 m
2005	European Indoor Championships	Madrid, Spain	10th (q)	2.27 m
2005	Mediterranean Games	Almería, Spain	4th	2.21 m
2005	World Championships	Helsinki, Finland	5th	2.29 m
2006	World Indoor Championships	Moscow, Russia	10th (q)	2.24 m
2006	European Championships	Gothenburg, Sweden	6th	2.27 m
2007	European Indoor Championships	Birmingham, United Kingdom	18th (q)	2.18 m
2007	World Championships	Osaka, Japan	16th (q)	2.26 m
2009	European Indoor Championships	Turin, Italy	10th (q)	2.27 m
2011	European Indoor Championships	Paris, France	9th (q)	2.22 m

== National titles ==
He has won 6 times the individual national championship.

- 2 wins in High jump (2005, 2009)
- 4 wins in High jump indoor (2002, 2005, 2006, 2011)

== See also ==
- Italian all-time top lists - High jump
