= Giulio Ciotti =

Italian high jumper (born 1976)

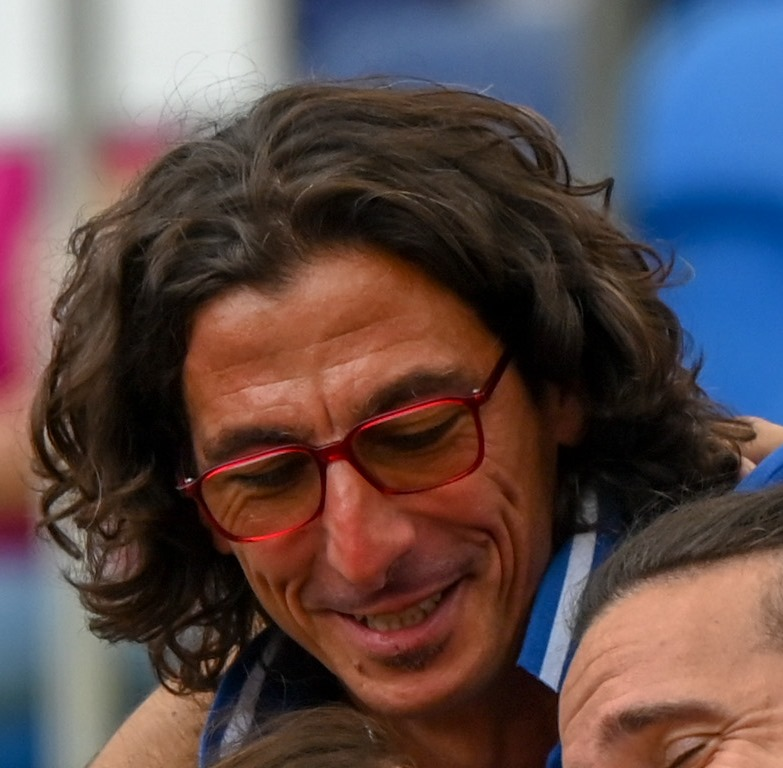
- Giulio Ciotti at Silesia 2023

Personal information
- Nationality: Italian
- Born: October 5, 1976 (age 49) Rimini, Italy
- Height: 1.87 m (6 ft 1 1/2 in)
- Weight: 78 kg (172 lb)

Sport
- Country: Italy
- Sport: Athletics
- Event: High jump
- Club: G.S. Fiamme Azzurre

Achievements and titles
- Personal best: High jump: 2.31 m (2006)
Medal record
European Cup
Silver medal – second place	2006 Malaga	High jump
Mediterranean Games
Silver medal – second place	2001 Tunis	High jump

Giulio Ciotti (born 5 October 1976 in Rimini) is an Italian high jumper. He is the twin brother of Nicola Ciotti.

In 2023, he became the coach of Gimbo Tamberi.

== Biography ==
He won the silver medal from the 2001 Mediterranean Games, finished seventh at the 2006 World Indoor Championships and tenth at the 2006 European Championships. He also competed at the 2002 European Championships, but without reaching the final.

Ciotti became Italian high jump champion in 2001, 2002 and 2006, besting Nicola Ciotti, Andrea Bettinelli, and Alessandro Talotti in those campaigns. He also became indoor champion in 1999 and 2001.

His personal best jump is 2.31 metres, achieved in July 2006 in Viersen and equalled in July 2009 in Formia.

== Achievements ==
Year	Competition	Venue	Position	Notes
1995	European Junior Championships	Nyíregyháza, Hungary	11th	2.10 m
2001	Mediterranean Games	Radès, Tunisia	2nd	2.19 m
2002	European Championships	Munich, Germany	18th (q)	2.15 m
2006	World Indoor Championships	Moscow, Russia	7th	2.26 m
2006	European Championships	Gothenburg, Sweden	10th	2.27 m
2009	Mediterranean Games	Pescara, Italy	5th	2.24 m
2009	World Championships	Berlin, Germany	11th	2.23 m

== National titles ==
He has won 5 times the individual national championship.

- 3 wins in High jump (2001, 2002, 2006)
- 2 wins in High jump indoor (1999, 2001)

== See also ==
- Italian all-time top lists - High jump
