= Rožle Prezelj =

Slovenian high jumper

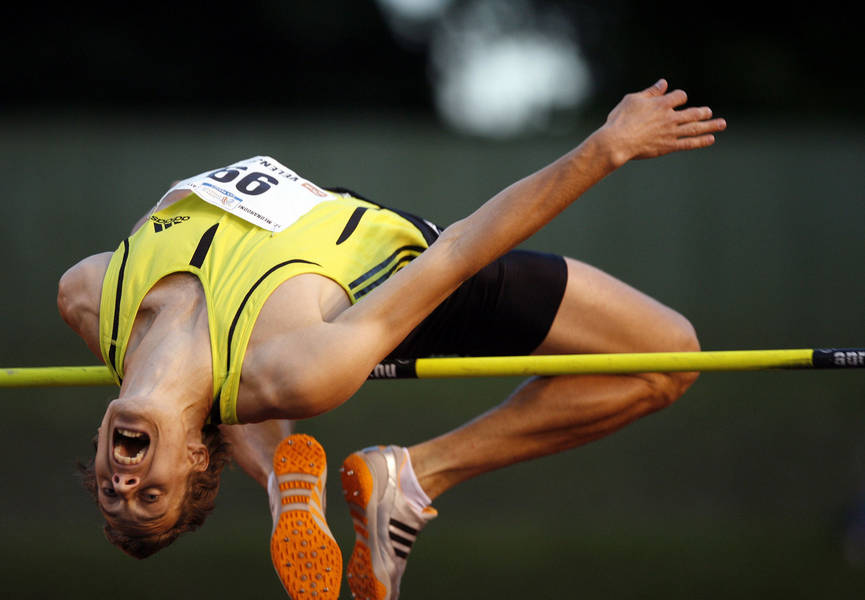
- Rožle Prezelj

Personal information
- Born: 26 September 1979 (age 46) Maribor, SR Slovenia, SFR Yugoslavia
- Height: 1.95 m (6 ft 5 in)
- Weight: 80 kg (176 lb)

Sport
- Country: Slovenia
- Sport: Athletics
- Event: High jump
- Updated on 15 August 2012

Rožle Prezelj (born 26 September 1979) is a Slovenian high jumper.

Prezelj represented Slovenia at the 2004, 2008 and 2012 Summer Olympics. His best result came at the 2008 Olympics when he finished the competition in 12th place. His father Dušan, who competed in the decathlon, had a high jump personal best of 2.15 m (set in 1976) and his mother Stanka Lovše-Prezelj was a two-time Yugoslav high jump champion with a personal best of 1.86 m (set in 1981).

After his retirement from professional competitions, Prezelj continued to be actively involved in athletics. In February 2016, he was elected Chairman of the IAAF Athletes' Commission (which is responsible for reviewing athletes' concerns and implementing relevant improvements), succeeding Frank Fredericks in the role.

== International competitions ==
Year	Competition	Venue	Position	Notes
Representing Slovenia
1998	World Junior Championships	Annecy, France	22nd (q)	2.05 m
2001	European U23 Championships	Amsterdam, Netherlands	1st	2.21 m
2001	Mediterranean Games	Radès, Tunisia	5th	2.19 m
2002	European Indoor Championships	Vienna, Austria	17th (q)	2.17 m
2002	European Championships	Munich, Germany	18th (q)	2.15 m
2003	World Championships	Paris, France	29th (q)	2.20 m
2004	World Indoor Championships	Budapest, Hungary	13th (q)	2.24 m
2004	Olympic Games	Athens, Greece	20th (q)	2.20 m
2005	European Indoor Championships	Madrid, Spain	21st (q)	2.18 m
2005	Mediterranean Games	Almería, Spain	8th	2.18 m
2006	European Championships	Gothenburg, Sweden	17th (q)	2.19 m
2007	European Indoor Championships	Birmingham, United Kingdom	21st (q)	2.13 m
2007	World Championships	Osaka, Japan	19th (q)	2.26 m
2008	Olympic Games	Beijing, China	12th	2.20 m
2010	European Championships	Barcelona, Spain	24th (q)	2.15 m
2011	European Indoor Championships	Paris, France	9th (q)	2.22 m
2011	World Championships	Daegu, South Korea	21st (q)	2.25 m
2012	European Championships	Helsinki, Finland	21st (q)	2.15 m
2012	Olympic Games	London, United Kingdom	25th (q)	2.21 m
2013	Mediterranean Games	Mersin, Turkey	7th	2.21 m
2013	World Championships	Moscow, Russia	25th (q)	2.17 m
