= Eike Onnen =

German high jumper

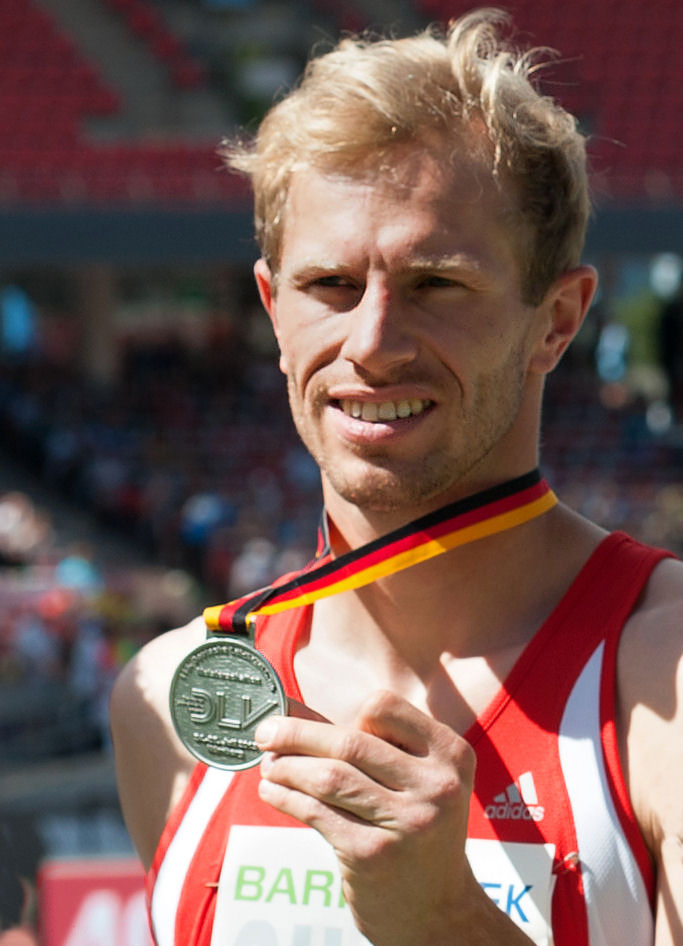
- Onnen in 2015

Personal information
- Born: 3 August 1982 (age 43) Hannover, West Germany
- Height: 1.94 m (6 ft 4 in)
- Weight: 83 kg (183 lb)

Sport
- Sport: Athletics
- Event: High jump
- Club: Hannover 96
- Coached by: Astrid Fredebold-Onnen
Medal record
European Championships
Bronze medal – third place	Amsterdam 2016	High jump

Eike Onnen (born 3 August 1982 in Hannover) is a German high jumper.

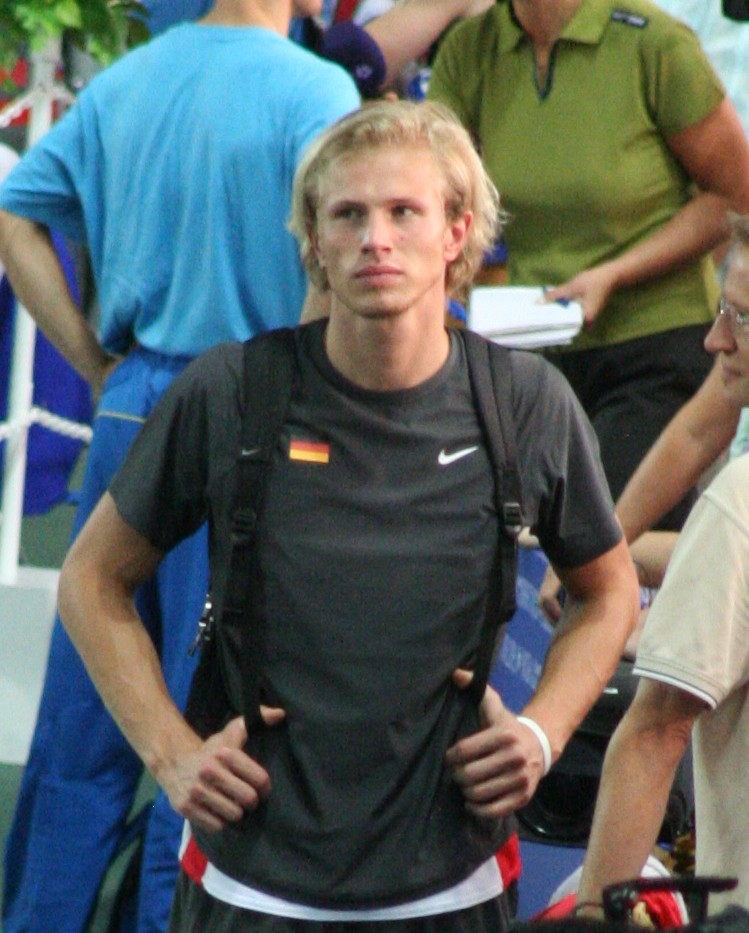
Eike Onnen in 2007

He comes from a sporting family with sister Imke also being a high jumper while mother Astrid Fredebold-Onnen a former heptathlete.

He finished seventh at the 2007 World Championships. He became German champion in 2005 and 2006, and represents the club LG Hannover.

He tied for third with Chris Baker in the 2016 European Athletics Championships.

His personal best jump is 2.34 metres, achieved in May 2007 in Garbsen.

== International competitions ==
Year	Competition	Venue	Position	Notes
Representing Germany
2003	European U23 Championships	Bydgoszcz, Poland	5th	2.23 m
2007	World Championships	Osaka, Japan	7th	2.26 m
2011	World Championships	Daegu, South Korea	15th (q)	2.28 m
2012	European Championships	Helsinki, Finland	10th	2.20 m
2015	World Championships	Beijing, China	12th	2.25 m
2016	European Championships	Amsterdam, Netherlands	3rd	2.29 m
2016	Olympic Games	Rio de Janeiro, Brazil	24th (q)	2.26 m
2017	World Championships	London, United Kingdom	10th	2.20 m
2018	European Championships	Berlin, Germany	8th	2.19 m
