= Martijn Nuijens =

Dutch track and field athlete

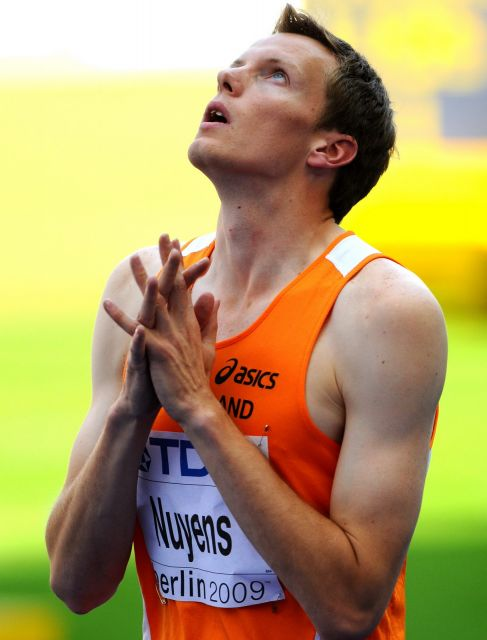
Nuijens at the 2009 World Championships in Athletics

Martijn Nuijens (Dutch: [mɑrˈtɛin ˈnœyəns]; born 18 November 1983) is a Dutch former track and field athlete who competed in the high jump. He is a three-time Dutch national high jump champion, having won in 2007, 2009 and 2010. His was a member of the Phanos track club. He is 1.94 m tall. His personal best for the event is 2.29 m (7 ft 6 in) set in 2009.

Born in Den Helder, Nuijens represented the Netherlands at the 2009 World Championships in Athletics, taking fifth place with a jump of 2.23 m (7 ft 3 3/4 in) in a final affected by heavy rain. He also competed in qualifying rounds only at the European Athletics Indoor Championships in 2007 and 2009, as well as the 2010 European Athletics Championships.

== International competitions ==
Year	Competition	Venue	Position	Notes
2007	European Indoor Championships	Birmingham, United Kingdom	15th (q)	2.18 m
2009	European Indoor Championships	Turin, Italy	20th (q)	2.17 m
2009	World Championships	Berlin, Germany	5th	2.23 m
2010	European Championships	Barcelona, Spain	23rd (q)	2.19 m

== National titles ==
- Dutch Athletics Championships
  - High jump: 2007, 2009, 2010

Awards
Preceded by Rutger Smith	Men's Dutch Athlete of the Year; 2009	Succeeded by Eelco Sintnicolaas
