= Viktor Shapoval =

Ukrainian high jumper (born 1979)

Viktor Shapoval (Ukrainian: Віктор Шаповал; born 17 October 1979) is a Ukrainian high jumper.

He competed at the 2009 European Indoor Championships and the 2009 World Championships without reaching the final.

He received Honours - National Championships in Ukraine in July 2007 with a mark of 2.24 metres.

His personal best jump is 2.34 metres, achieved in September 2009 in Berdychiv.
