= Michał Bieniek =

Polish high jumper (born 1984)

Michał Bieniek (born 17 May 1984, in Gryfino) is a former Polish athlete who specialized in the high jump. He competed at the 2008 Summer Olympics. His personal best is 2.36 meters achieved in 2005 in Biała Podlaska.

== Competition record ==
Year	Competition	Venue	Position	Notes
Representing Poland
2001	World Youth Championships	Debrecen, Hungary	4th	2.17 m
2002	World Junior Championships	Kingston, Jamaica	13th	2.05 m
2003	World Championships	Paris, France	22nd (q)	2.20 m
2005	European Indoor Championships	Madrid, Spain	14th (q)	2.23 m
2005	European U23 Championships	Erfurt, Germany	7th	2.23 m
2007	World Championships	Osaka, Japan	11th	2.21 m
2008	Olympic Games	Beijing, China	24th (q)	2.20 m
