= Svatoslav Ton =

Czech high jumper

Personal information
- Nationality: Czech
- Born: 20 October 1978 (age 48) Brno, Czechoslovakia
- Height: 192 cm (6 ft 4 in)
- Weight: 75 kg (165 lb)

Sport
- Team: TJ Dukla Praha

Svatoslav Ton (Czech pronunciation: [ˈsvatoslaf ˈton]; born 20 October 1978) is a Czech high jumper. His personal best jump is 2.33 metres, achieved in June 2004 in Prague.

== Achievements ==
Year	Competition	Venue	Position	Notes
Representing Czech Republic
1995	European Junior Swimming Championships	Nyíregyháza, Hungary	Qualified	2.07m
1996	World Junior Championships	Sydney, Australia	2nd	2.21 m
1997	World Indoor Championships	Paris, France	17th (q)	2.24 m
1997	Universiade	Catania, Italy	? (q)	2.10 m
1999	European U23 Championships	Gothenburg, Sweden	17th (q)	2.10 m
2001	Universiade	Beijing, China	7th	2.20 m
2002	European Indoor Championships	Vienna, Austria	10th	2.20 m
2002	European Championships	Munich, Germany	6th	2.25 m
2004	Olympic Games	Athens, Greece	8th	2.29 m
2005	European Indoor Championships	Madrid, Spain	7th	2.27 m
2005	World Championships	Helsinki, Finland	21st (q)	2.20 m
2006	World Indoor Championships	Moscow, Russia	15th (q)	2.20 m
2006	European Championships	Gothenburg, Sweden	6th	2.27 m
2007	European Indoor Championships	Birmingham, United Kingdom	10th (q)	2.23 m
2007	World Championships	Osaka, Japan	22nd (q)	2.26 m
