= Filippo Campioli =

Italian high jumper

Personal information
- Nationality: Italian
- Born: February 21, 1982 (age 44) Modena, Italy
- Height: 1.93 m (6 ft 4 in)
- Weight: 78 kg (172 lb)

Sport
- Country: Italy
- Sport: Athletics
- Event: High jump
- Club: C.S. Esercito

Achievements and titles
- Personal best: High jump: 2.30 m (2008)

Filippo Campioli (born 21 February 1982) is a former high jumper from Italy. His personal best jump is 2.30 metres, achieved in June 2008 in Formia.

== Biography ==
He finished tenth at the 2008 Olympic Games. He also competed at the 2007 European Indoor Championships and the 2008 World Indoor Championships without reaching the final.

== Achievements ==
Year	Competition	Venue	Position	Event	Notes
Representing Italy
2003	European U23 Championships	(Poland) Bydgoszcz	9th	High jump	2.18 m
2008	World Indoor Championships	(Spain) Valencia	15th	High jump	2.15 m
2008	Olympic Games	(China) Beijing	10th	High jump	2.20 m
2009	European Indoor Championships	(Italy) Turin	4th	High jump	2.29 m

== National titles ==
Filippo Campioli has won 4 times the individual national championship.

- 3 wins in the high jump (2007, 2008, 2010)
- 1 win in the high jump indoor (2008)

== See also ==
- Italian all-time top lists - High jump
