= Tora Harris =

American high jumper

Personal information
- Born: September 21, 1978 (age 47) College Park, Georgia, U.S.
- Education: Princeton
- Years active: 1998-?
- Height: 6 ft 3 in (191 cm)
- Weight: 183 lb (83 kg; 13 st 1 lb)

Sport
- Sport: Track and field

Achievements and titles
- Personal bests: Ivy League indoor high jump: 7 feet 3.25 inches (2.22 m); Ivy League outdoor high jump: (7 feet 7 inches (2.31 m))
Medal record
Men's athletics: high jump
Representing the United States
Universiade
Bronze medal – third place	2001 Beijing	High jump
IAAF World Cup
Bronze medal – third place	2006 Athens	High jump
USA Indoor Championships
Silver medal – second place	2003 Boston	High jump
Silver medal – second place	2004	High jump
Gold medal – first place	2005 Boston	High jump
Silver medal – second place	2006 Boston	High jump
Gold medal – first place	2007 Boston	High jump
USA Outdoor Championships
Bronze medal – third place	2004 Sacramento	High jump
Gold medal – first place	2006 Indianapolis	High jump
Gold medal – first place	2009 Eugene	High jump
Silver medal – second place	2010 Des Moines	High jump
Representing Princeton Tigers/Ivy League
NCAA Outdoor Championships
Gold medal – first place	2002 Baton Rouge	high jump
NCAA Indoor Championships
Gold medal – first place	2002 Fayetteville	high jump
By race
Event	1st	2nd	3rd
outdoor high jump	1	0	0
indoor high jump	1	0	0
Total	2	0	0
Event	1st	2nd	3rd
NCAA Outdoor Championships	1	0	0
NCAA Indoor Championships	1	0	0
Total	2	0	0

Tora Lian-Juin Harris (born September 21, 1978) is an American high jumper. He is a Princeton University engineer of Taiwanese and African-American descent. Harris is an Olympian, a four-time national champion and two-time bronze medalist in international competition. He represented Team USA twice in the IAAF World Championships in Athletics, three times in the IAAF World Indoor Championships in Athletics and has served as a representative once in the IAAF Continental Cup. He spent two years as the No. 1 ranked high jumper in the United States.

In college, Harris was a five-time All-American, while earning the two individual (2002 indoor and outdoor) National Collegiate Athletic Association (NCAA) championships. He also represented Team USA at one World University Games. He is both the Ivy League indoor and outdoor high jump record holder and Princeton's only two-time NCAA individual event track and field champion. He is an eight-time individual Ivy League/Heptagonal champion, winning the indoor and outdoor high jump championships four times each.

== Early life ==
Harris was born in College Park, Georgia. His mother, Susan (Su-Chen), is Taiwanese. His father, Tommie Lee Harris (1934–1999), was African American. His parents made him take Chinese lessons when he was young, and he now speaks the language fluently. He attended first grade in Taiwan, where he was introduced to jumping. Harris high jumped 7 feet (2.13 m) in high school. He placed second in the 1997 Georgia High School Association Class AAA high jump championships. Harris is a 1997 alumnus of South Atlanta High School and was a member of Princeton University's graduating class of 2002. Harris studied mechanical and aerospace engineering at Princeton.

== College career ==
While at Princeton, Harris excelled at intercollegiate athletics. Harris was a four-time NCAA Outdoor Track & Field All-American placing 7th, 5th, 4th and 1st in 1998, 1999, 2001 and 2002, respectively. He also was an NCAA Indoor All-American in 2002 when he placed 1st at the NCAA Championships. He did not participate in intercollegiate competition in 2000 in order to prepare for the 2000 United States Olympic trials. He failed to make the team after finishing seventh at the Olympic trials.

He won the indoor heptagonal championships in 2001, tying an Ivy League indoor record (7 feet 3.25 inches (2.22 m)) that still stood as of 2011. He won the 2001 outdoor Heptagonal championships with a record jump of 7 feet 5.25 inches (2.27 m). That year he was the Indoor Heptagonal Championships Most Outstanding Performer and Outdoor Heptagonal Championships Most Outstanding Performer as well as the Mid-Atlantic Region Male Indoor Athlete of the Year as selected by the United States Track Coaches Association. He won a bronze medal at the 2001 World University Games. His 2002 outdoor Heptagonal championships performance of 7 feet 7 inches (2.31 m) continues to be an Ivy League outdoor record.

Harris concluded his collegiate career with a total of eight Ivy League/Heptagonal individual championships. He was also both the NCAA indoor and outdoor champion in 2002. By winning both the indoor and outdoor NCAA championships, he became Princeton's only two-time NCAA individual event track and field champion. He finished second to Yasser El Halaby as Princeton's Athlete of the 2000–09 Decade.

== Professional career ==
He was a two-time United States National indoor champion (2005 and 2007) and a two-time United States National outdoor champion (2006 and 2009). At the 2003 USA Indoor Track and Field Championships, Harris, Charles Austin and Charles Clinger all posted heights of 7 feet 6.5 inches (2.30 m), with Austin claiming gold based on fewer misses and Harris winning a jump off for silver. On two other occasions (2006 Indoor vs. Adam Shunk at 2.25 m, and 2010 Outdoor vs. Jesse Williams at 2.26 m) he earned silver medals at the US national championships despite clearing as high a height as the gold medalist.

He was a member of the United States team at the 2004 Summer Olympics along with high jumpers Matt Hemingway and Jamie Nieto. Harris failed to advance past the first round when he could not clear 7 feet 2.5 inches (2.20 m) on any of his three attempts leaving him with a best height of 7 feet (2.13 m) and a 17th-place finish. He represented the United States at the IAAF World Championships in Athletics in both 2003 and 2009 and in the IAAF World Indoor Championships in Athletics in 2003, 2004 and 2006. He won a bronze medal at the 2006 IAAF World Cup.

Harris was the No. 1 ranked high jumper in the United States according to Track & Field News in both 2002 and 2006 and was among the top 10 every year from 2001 through 2009. His personal best jump is 2.33 metres (7 ft 7.73 in), achieved in June 2006 in Indianapolis. Harris trains out of his Chula Vista, California, residence.

He has developed, produced and marketed the electric ODK cargo bike, under the Juiced Bikes name.

== See also ==
- List of Princeton University Olympians
