= Adrian O'Dwyer =

Irish arm wrestler

Personal information
- Nationality: Ireland
- Born: 1 December 1983 (age 42) Kilkenny, Ireland
- Height: 1.97 m (6 ft 6 in)
- Weight: 80 kg (176 lb)

Sport
- Sport: Athletics
- Event: High jump
- Club: Kilkenny City Harriers
- Coached by: Sean Lynch; Maeve Kyle

Achievements and titles
- Personal best: High jump: 2.30 (2004)

Adrian O'Dwyer (born 1 December 1983) is an Irish professional arm wrestler and former high jumper.

During his athletic career, O'Dwyer held two senior Irish outdoor (2002 and 2003) and indoor titles (2003 and 2004), and competed in the men's high jump at the 2004 Summer Olympics, representing his nation Ireland. Additionally, he set his own personal best and a remarkable Irish record at 2.30m at the international meet in Algiers to secure a place on the Olympic team. Indeed, O'Dwyer was one of the tallest athletes in the elite Irish track and field team, standing 1.97 m (6 ft 5 1/2 in).

== Early life ==
O'Dwyer was born in Kilkenny to his sporting parents Paddy O'Dwyer, a judoka who competed for Ireland at the 1975 World Judo Championships in Vienna, Austria, and Gudrun Marx, an East German-born eventing rider. O'Dwyer attended both primary and secondary school at CBS Kilkenny, where he began his athletics career and lettered in the sprint races and long jump. At the age of 13, O'Dwyer grew exceptionally taller and turned his attention to high jump. Since then, O'Dwyer excelled the sport, and had an initial jump of 1.86 m, until he extended it tremendously to 2.01 to establish a high school and junior record in 1999.

In 2000, O'Dwyer moved to St Kieran's College to continually pursue his high jump career. While at St Kieran's, he set numerous intermediate high school records and earned more titles in the same discipline at the Irish Schools Athletics Championships.

== International career ==
After graduating from St Kieran's in early 2003, O'Dwyer trained full-time for Kilkenny City Harriers, under his personal coach Sean Lynch. In June 2003, O'Dwyer overhauled the seven-feet barrier (2.13 m) for the first time in nearly decades to attain a heroic second-place finish on his international debut at the Europa Cup meet in Copenhagen, Denmark.

In the 2004 indoor season, O'Dwyer recorded a new career best and a national record of 2.27 m to finish eighth in the final at the World Championships in Budapest, making him the first Irish athlete to reach the top of the world indoor rankings in any field event. Shortly after the Worlds, O'Dwyer broke the Irish under-23 record with a leap of 2.26 m at the high jump meet in Eppingen, Germany, edging closer to the 2.30-metre mark.

Upon entering the outdoor season in June 2004, O'Dwyer pulled off a magnificent jump at 2.30 m to trump the home crowd favorite and 2000 Olympic bronze medalist Abderrahmane Hammad for the high jump title at the international meet in Algiers, Algeria. In doing so, he smashed both his personal best and a five-year senior national outdoor record (previously set by Brendan Reilly in 1999) and achieved an Olympic A-standard to book his place on the Irish team to the Games.

At the 2004 Summer Olympics in Athens, O'Dwyer qualified for the Irish squad, as a lone athlete, in the men's high jump. He crashed out prematurely of the qualifying round after failing to clear an opening height of 2.10 metres in all three attempts that left him bitterly disappointed by his poor performance.

== Arm wrestling career ==
On 24 March 2024, O’Dwyer competed in his first professional arm wrestling match against the Canadian Brenden Lemmon ‘’The Lemonator’’ Mulvihill in the 105 kg category, where he won 4-2.

== Personal life ==
O'Dwyer currently owns and runs a gym, Leviathan Training in Kilkenny City. He is now full time professional arm wrestler.

=== Notable matches ===
Year	Opponent	Result	Hand	Outcome	Event
2024	Brenden Lemmon Mulvihill	Won	Right Hand	4-2	Valhalla 3
