= Aleksander Waleriańczyk =

Polish high jumper (born 1982)

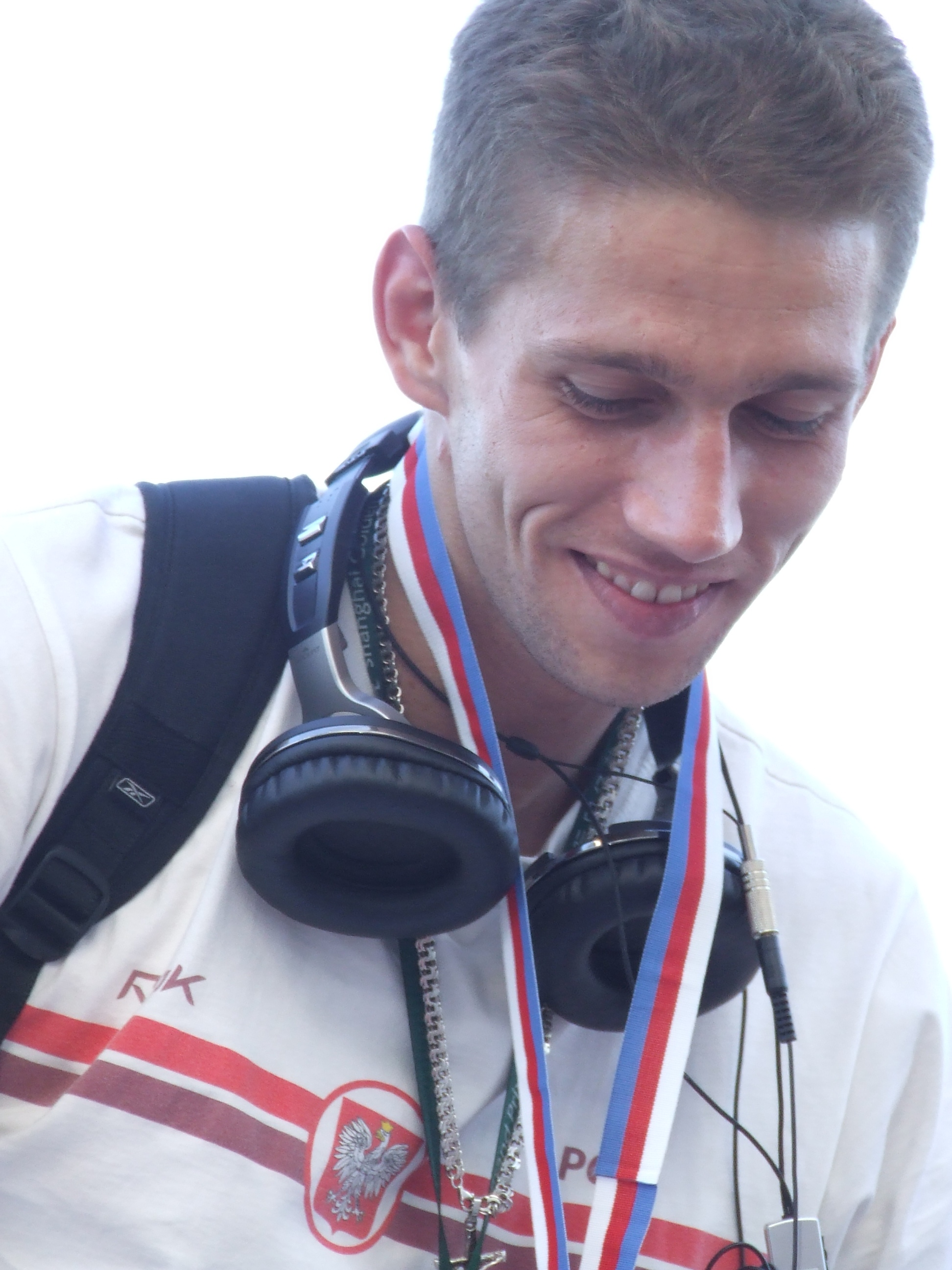

Medal record

Men's Athletics

Representing Poland

Summer Universiade
Gold medal – first place	2005 İzmir	High Jump

European U23 Championships
Gold medal – first place	2003 Bydgoszcz	High Jump

Aleksander Walerianczyk (born 1 September 1982, in Kraków) is a former Polish high jumper.

He finished thirteenth at the 2002 European Championships in Munich, tenth at the 2003 World Championships in Paris and fifth at the 2007 European Indoor Championships in Birmingham. He won the 2005 Summer Universiade in İzmir.

His personal best jump is 2.36 metres, achieved in July 2003 in Bydgoszcz.

Waleriańczyk tested positive for caffeine at Hochsprungmeeting in Eberstadt 27 July 2003 and received a public warning.

== Competition record ==
Year	Competition	Venue	Position	Notes
Representing Poland
2002	European Championships	Munich, Germany	13th	2.18 m
2003	European U23 Championships	Bydgoszcz, Poland	1st	2.36 m
2003	World Championships	Paris, France	10th	2.25 m
2005	Universiade	İzmir, Turkey	1st	2.30 m
2007	European Indoor Championships	Birmingham, United Kingdom	5th	2.20 m
2007	World Championships	Osaka, Japan	27th (q)	2.19 m

Sporting positions
Preceded by (South Africa) Jacques Freitag	Men's High Jump Best Year Performance alongside (Sweden) Stefan Holm (i); 2003	Succeeded by (Sweden) Stefan Holm (i)
