= Linus Thörnblad =

Swedish high jumper

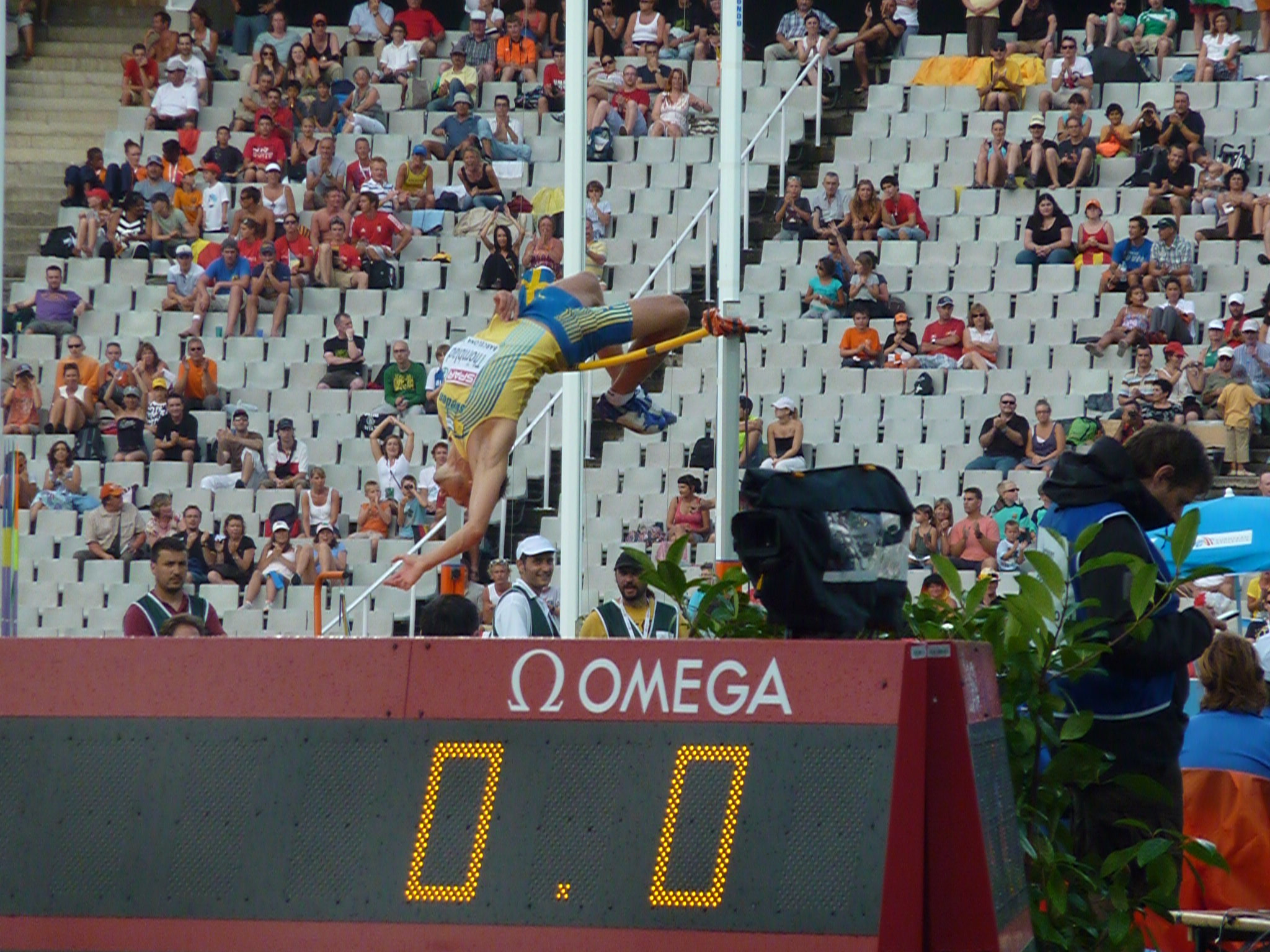
- Linus Thörnblad

Personal information
- Full name: Carl Linus Thörnblad
- Nationality: Swedish
- Born: 6 March 1985 (age 41) Lund, Sweden
- Height: 1.80 m (5 ft 11 in)
- Weight: 76 kg (168 lb)

Sport
- Event: High jump
- Club: Malmö AI
- Coached by: Yannick Tregaro

Achievements and titles
- Personal bests: 2.34 m 2.38 m (indoors)
Medal record
World Indoor Championships
Bronze medal – third place	2006 Moscow	High jump
European Indoor Championships
Silver medal – second place	2007 Birmingham	High jump
European Junior Championships
Bronze medal – third place	2003 Tampere	High jump
World Athletics Final
Gold medal – first place	2006 Stuttgart	High jump
Bronze medal – third place	2007 Stuttgart	High jump

Linus Thörnblad (born 6 March 1985) is a Swedish former track and field athlete competing in high jump. He won the bronze medal at the 2006 IAAF World Indoor Championships and a silver medal at the 2007 European Athletics Indoor Championships. He represented Sweden at the Summer Olympics in 2004 and 2008 and finished fourth at the 2010 European Athletics Championships. He has a personal best of 2.38 metres set indoors.

== Biography ==
Thörnblad started high jumping at the age of 16, jumping 2.06 m in his first year. Two years later he jumped 2.30 m. He decided to retire from competition in 2012 at the age of 27 due to trouble with injuries and clinical depression. In August 2018, he briefly returned to the track and won the high jump competition at the Swedish Athletics Championships, after which he returned to retirement.

== Achievements ==
Year	Competition	Venue	Position	Notes
Representing Sweden
2002	World Junior Championships	Kingston, Jamaica	17th	2.15 m
2004	World Junior Championships	Grosseto, Italy	4th	2.21 m
2004	Olympic Games	Athens, Greece	24th	2.20 m
2005	European Indoor Championships	Madrid, Spain	20th	2.18 m
2005	European U23 Championships	Erfurt, Germany	10th	2.21 m
2006	World Indoor Championships	Moscow, Russia	3rd	2.33 m
2006	European Championships	Gothenburg, Sweden	4th	2.34 m
2006	World Athletics Final	Stuttgart, Germany	1st	2.33 m
2007	European Indoor Championships	Birmingham, United Kingdom	2nd	2.32 m
2007	European U23 Championships	Debrecen, Hungary	1st	2.24 m
2007	World Championships	Osaka, Japan	15th	2.16 m
2007	World Athletics Final	Stuttgart, Germany	3rd	2.27 m
2008	Olympic Games	Beijing, China	26th	2.20 m
2009	European Indoor Championships	Turin, Italy	20th	2.17 m
2009	World Championships	Berlin, Germany	5th	2.23 m
2010	European Championships	Barcelona, Spain	4th	2.29 m
