= Yaroslav Rybakov =

Russian high jumper

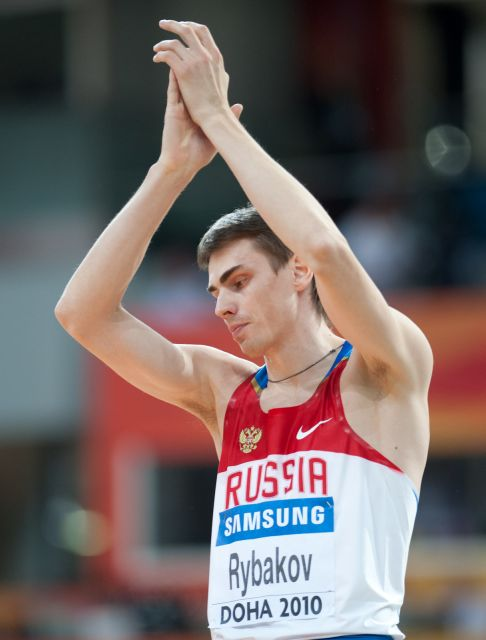
- Rybakov during 2010 IAAF World Indoor Championships

Personal information
- Full name: Yaroslav Vladimirovich Rybakov
- Born: November 22, 1980 (age 45) Mogilyev, Belarusian SSR, Soviet Union
- Height: 1.96 m (6 ft 5 in)
- Weight: 84 kg (185 lb)

Sport
- Country: Russia
- Sport: Men's athletics
- Event: High jump

Achievements and titles
- Personal bests: 2.35 m 2.38 m (indoors)
Medal record
Men's athletics
Representing Russia
Olympic Games
Bronze medal – third place	2008 Beijing	High jump
World Championships
Gold medal – first place	2009 Berlin	High jump
Silver medal – second place	2001 Edmonton	High jump
Silver medal – second place	2005 Helsinki	High jump
Silver medal – second place	2007 Osaka	High jump
World Indoor Championships
Gold medal – first place	2006 Moscow	High jump
Silver medal – second place	2003 Birmingham	High jump
Silver medal – second place	2004 Budapest	High jump
Silver medal – second place	2008 Valencia	High jump
Silver medal – second place	2010 Doha	High jump
European Championships
Gold medal – first place	2002 Munich	High jump
European Indoor Championships
Silver medal – second place	2005 Madrid	High jump
Bronze medal – third place	2002 Vienna	High jump

Yaroslav Vladimirovich Rybakov (Ярослав Владимирович Рыбаков, born November 22, 1980, in Mogilyev, Soviet Union) is a retired Russian high jumper.

He is the 2002 European Champion high jumper, and at the 2005 World Championships he shared the silver medal with Víctor Moya of Cuba.

In 2006 he won the World Indoor Championships, and finished fifth in the high jump final at the 2006 European Athletics Championships in Gothenburg. The next year he won his third World Championships silver medal in a new personal best jump of 2.35 metres. In 2009, he finally won gold at the World Championships in Berlin.

His indoor personal best is 2.38 metres, set in February 2005 in Stockholm. Since then he has equalled the mark three times, which has included a meet record for the Hochsprung mit Musik.

== Records ==
Rybakov set the Russian national record of 2.38, indoors, at the 16th GE Galan meet at the Globe Arena in Stockholm, Sweden on Tuesday 15 February 2005. It was the highest indoor leap in the world since March 2000, and improved his personal best by one cm. He was pushed to the record by Czech jumper Jaroslav Baba, who finished second at 2.34. Rybakov set the record by making 5-consecutive first try clearances at 2.21, 2.26, 2.29, 2.32 and 2.34, and then clearing 2.38 on his third, and final, attempt.

Two years later, Rybakov would push his younger compatriot Ivan Ukhov to break his national record at the Moscow Winter Cup meet on 28 January 2007. In a tactical duel, Rybakov would finish second at 2.35 (with one attempt at 2.37 and two at 2.39), while 20-year-old Ukhov had a first try clearance at 2.39. One week later, at the Arnstadt, Germany meet on 3 February 2007, Rybakov would win, tying his personal best of 2.38, while Ukhov finished fourth at 2.31.

== International competitions ==
Year	Competition	Venue	Position	Notes
Representing Russia
1998	World Junior Championships	Annecy, France	5th	2.18 m
1999	European Junior Championships	Riga, Latvia	3rd	2.16 m
2001	World Indoor Championships	Lisbon, Portugal	7th	2.25 m
2001	World Championships	Edmonton, Canada	2nd	2.33 m
2001	Goodwill Games	Brisbane, Australia	3rd	2.31 m
2002	European Indoor Championships	Vienna, Austria	3rd	2.30 m
2002	European Championships	Munich, Germany	1st	2.31 m
2002	World Cup	Madrid, Spain	1st	2.31 m
2002	IAAF Grand Prix Final	Paris, France	2nd	2.28 m
2003	World Indoor Championships	Birmingham, England	2nd	2.33 m
2003	World Championships	Paris, France	9th	2.25 m
2003	World Athletics Final	Monte Carlo, Monaco	1st	2.30 m
2004	World Indoor Championships	Budapest, Hungary	2nd	2.32 m
2004	Olympic Games	Athens, Greece	6th	2.32 m
2004	IAAF World Athletics Final	Monte Carlo, Monaco	2nd	2.30 m
2005	European Indoor Championships	Madrid, Spain	2nd	2.38 m
2005	World Championships	Helsinki, Finland	2nd	2.29 m
2005	IAAF World Athletics Final	Monte Carlo, Monaco	3rd	2.32 m
2006	World Indoor Championships	Moscow, Russia	1st	2.37 m
2006	European Championships	Gothenburg, Sweden	5th	2.30 m
2006	World Athletics Final	Stuttgart, Germany	3rd	2.29 m
2007	World Championships	Osaka, Japan	2nd	2.35 m
2007	World Athletics Final	Stuttgart, Germany	6th	2.27 m
2008	World Indoor Championships	Valencia, Spain	2nd	2.34 m
2008	Olympic Games	Beijing, China	3rd	2.34 m
2009	World Championships	Berlin, Germany	1st	2.32 m
2010	World Indoor Championships	Doha, Qatar	2nd	2.31 m

Sporting positions
Preceded by (Sweden) Stefan Holm (i)	Men's High Jump Best Year Performance alongside (Russia) Ivan Ukhov (i), (Russia) Andrey Silnov; 2006(i)	Succeeded by (Russia) Ivan Ukhov (i)
Preceded by (Russia) Ivan Ukhov (i)	Men's High Jump Best Year Performance alongside (Russia) Andrey Silnov; 2008(i)	Succeeded by (Russia) Ivan Ukhov (i)
