= Andrea Bettinelli =

Italian high jumper

Personal information
- Nationality: Italian
- Born: August 23, 1978 (age 47) Venezia, Italy
- Height: 1.94 m (6 ft 4 1/2 in)
- Weight: 84 kg (185 lb)

Sport
- Country: Italy
- Sport: Athletics
- Event: High jump
- Club: G.S. Fiamme Gialle

Achievements and titles
- Personal best: High jump: 2.31 m (2003)

Andrea Bettinelli (born 6 October 1978, in Bergamo) is an Italian high jumper.

== Biography ==
He finished ninth at the 2002 European Championships, sixth at the 2005 European Indoor Championships, eleventh at the 2006 European Championships and fifth at the 2007 European Indoor Championships. He also competed at the European Indoor Championships in 2002 and 2009, the World Championships in 2003, 2005 and 2007, the World Indoor Championships in 2003 and 2004 as well as the 2008 Olympic Games without reaching the final.

Bettinelli became Italian high jump champion in 2003, besting Giulio Ciotti, Nicola Ciotti, and Alessandro Talotti that year . He also became indoor champion in 2003 and 2004.

His personal best jump is 2.31 metres, first achieved in August 2003 in Rieti.

== Olympic results ==
Year	Competition	Venue	Position	Event	Performance	Notes
2008	Olympic Games	(China) Beijing	Qual.	High jump	2.25 m	

== National titles ==
Andrea Bettinelli has won 4 times the individual national championship.

- 1 win in high jump (2003)
- 3 wins in high jump indoor (2003, 2004, 2007)

== See also ==
- Italian all-time top lists - High jump
