= Marko Aleksejev =

Estonian high jumper

Personal information
- Full name: Marko Aleksejev
- Nationality: Estonia
- Born: 14 February 1979 (age 47) Tartu, then part of Estonian SSR, Soviet Union
- Height: 1.96 m (6 ft 5 in)
- Weight: 80 kg (176 lb)

Sport
- Sport: Athletics
- Event: High jump
- Club: Audentese SK
- Coached by: Allan Eleranna

Achievements and titles
- Personal best: High jump: 2.28 (2005)

Marko Aleksejev (born 14 February 1979) is a retired Estonian high jumper. He was selected to compete for the Estonian squad in the men's high jump at the 2004 Summer Olympics, and also trained throughout his athletic career for Audentese Sport Club (Estonian: Audentese Spordi Klubi) in Tallinn, under his personal coach Allan Eleranna. In 2005, Aleksejev recorded his personal best jump at 2.28 m from the International High Jump Meet in Bühl, Germany.

Aleksejev qualified for the Estonian squad in the men's high jump at the 2004 Summer Olympics in Athens. Three months before the Games, he cleared 2.27 m on his legal attempt to attain the exact Olympic B-height and assure a place on the Estonian track and field team from the European High Jump Meet in Herzogenbuchsee, Switzerland. Aleksejev elected to strenuously pass a single attempt at 2.10 and 2.15, until he could not overhaul the 2.20-metre barrier with all three misses, leaving him in a thirty-first place tie with Spain's Javier Bermejo at the end of the qualifying round.
