= Andrey Tereshin =

Russian high jumper

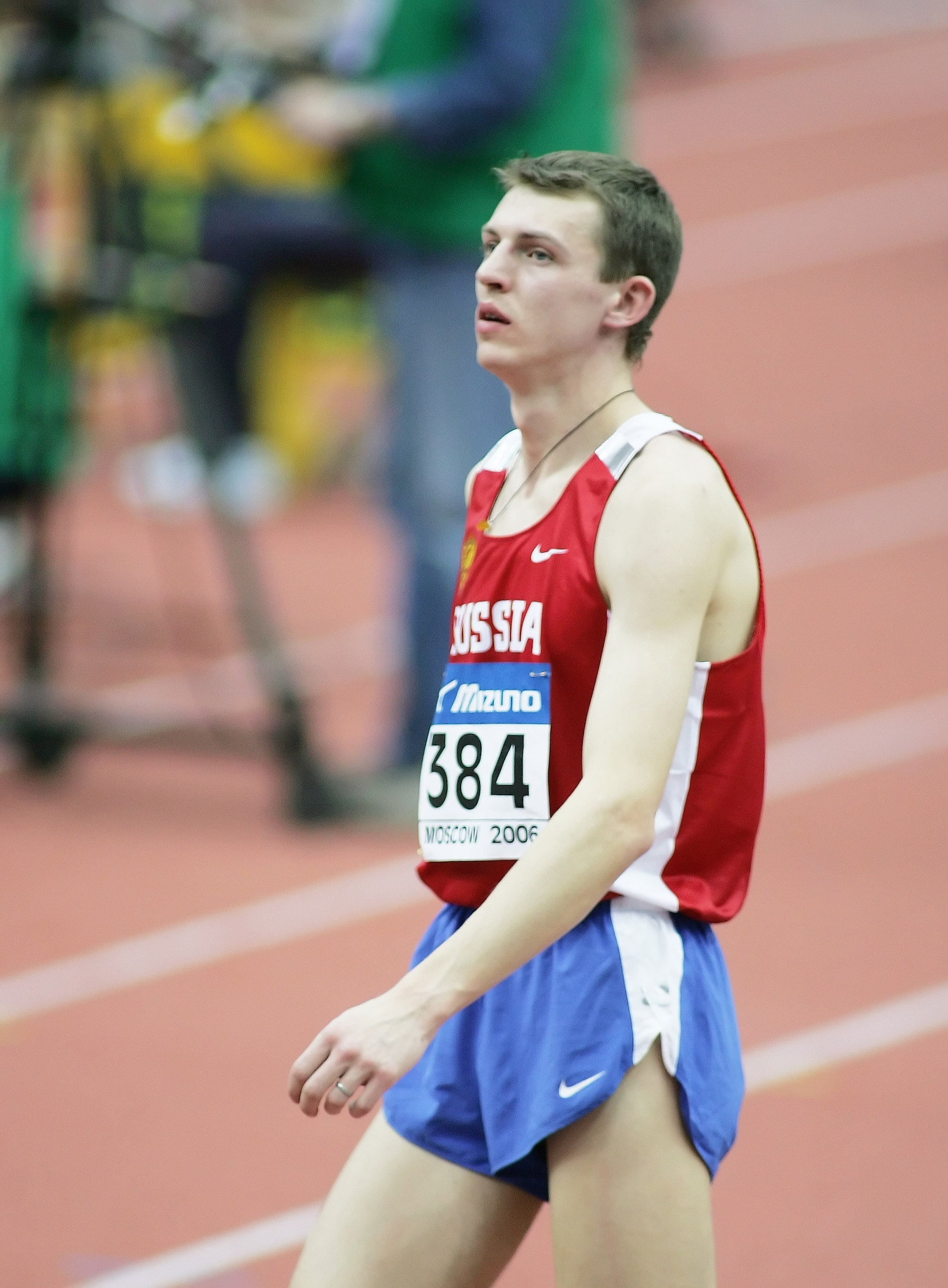
Andrey Tereshin

Andrey Tereshin (born 15 December 1982) is a male high jumper from Russia.

His personal best is 2.34 metres, though he has jumped 2.36 metres indoor in February 2006 in Moscow.

== Achievements ==
Year	Competition	Venue	Position	Notes
Representing Russia
2003	European U23 Championships	Bydgoszcz, Poland	2nd	2.27 m
2003	Universiade	Daegu, South Korea	6th	2.20 m
2005	European Indoor Championships	Madrid, Spain	8th	2.24 m
2006	World Indoor Championships	Moscow, Russia	2nd	2.36m PBi
2007	European Indoor Championships	Birmingham, England	7th	2.20 m
2008	World Indoor Championships	Valencia, Spain	11th	2.24 m
