= List of high jump national champions (men) =

Below a list of all national champions in the men's high jump event in track and field from several countries since 1980.

== Argentina ==
- 1980: Fernando Pastoriza
- 1981: Oscar Baronetto
- 1982: Carlos Gambetta
- 1983: Fernando Pastoriza
- 1984: Fernando Pastoriza
- 1985: Fernando Pastoriza
- 1986: Fernando Pastoriza
- 1987: Fernando Pastoriza
- 1988: Fernando Moreno
- 1989: Fernando Pastoriza
- 1990: Fernando Moreno
- 1991: Fernando Moreno
- 1992: Fernando Moreno
- 1993: Fernando Moreno
- 1994: Erasmo Jara
- 1995: Erasmo Jara
- 1996: Erasmo Jara
- 1997: Erasmo Jara
- 1998: Erasmo Jara
- 1999: Erasmo Jara
- 2000: Erasmo Jara
- 2001: Erasmo Jara
- 2002: Erasmo Jara
- 2003: Erasmo Jara
- 2004: Leandro Piedrabuena
- 2005: Erasmo Jara
- 2006: Santiago Guerci

== Australia ==
- 1980: David Morrow
- 1981: David Hoyle
- 1982: Larry Sayers
- 1983: Mark Barratt
- 1984: John Atkinson
- 1985: Michael Allen
- 1986: Lee Balkin (USA)
- 1987: Marc Howard
- 1988: David Anderson
- 1989: Ian Garrett
- 1990: David Anderson
- 1991: Tim Forsyth
- 1992: Tim Forsyth
- 1993: Tim Forsyth
- 1994: Tim Forsyth
- 1995: Ian Garrett
- 1996: Chris Anderson
- 1997: Tim Forsyth
- 1998: Tim Forsyth
- 1999: Ron Garlett
- 2000: Nick Moroney
- 2001: Nick Moroney
- 2002: Nick Moroney
- 2003: Joshua Lodge
- 2004: Nick Moroney
- 2005: Nick Moroney
- 2006: Nick Moroney
- 2007: Liam Zamel-Paez
- 2008: Cal Pearce
- 2009: Liam Zamel-Paez
- 2010: Liam Zamel-Paez
- 2011: Chris Armet
- 2012: Nick Moroney
- 2013: Brandon Starc
- 2014: Nik Bojic

== Belarus ==
- 1992: Vladimir Zaboronyok
- 1993: Oleg Zhukovskiy
- 1994: Nikolay Moskalev
- 1995: Gintaras Varanauskas (LTU)
- 1996: Aleksandr Buglakov
- 1997: Oleg Vorobey
- 1998: Oleg Vorobey
- 1999: Aleksey Lesnichiy
- 2000: Oleg Prokopov
- 2001: Aleksey Lesnichiy
- 2002: Aleksey Lesnichiy
- 2003: Aleksandr Veryutin
- 2004: Gennadiy Moroz
- 2005: Aleksandr Veryutin
- 2006: Aleksandr Veryutin

== Belgium ==
- 1980: Guy Moreau
- 1981: Peter Soetewey
- 1982: William Nachtegael
- 1983: Eddy Annys
- 1984: Marc Borra
- 1985: Eddy Annys
- 1986: Patrick Steemans
- 1987: Marc Hallemeersch
- 1988: Dimitri Maenhout
- 1989: Gerolf De Backer
- 1990: Gerolf De Backer
- 1991: Dimitri Maenhout
- 1992: Dimitri Maenhout
- 1993: Dominique Sandron
- 1994: Dominique Sandron
- 1995: Carl Van Roeyen
- 1996: Livio Baggio
- 1997: Carl Van Roeyen
- 1998: Carl Van Roeyen
- 1999: Patrick De Paepe
- 2000: Patrick De Paepe
- 2001: Stijn Stroobants
- 2002: Stijn Stroobants
- 2003: Benoît Braconnier
- 2004: Stijn Stroobants
- 2005: Stijn Stroobants
- 2006: Stijn Stroobants
- 2007: Timothy Hubert
- 2008: Tim Rummens
- 2009: Stijn Stroobants
- 2010: Stijn Stroobants
- 2011: Timothy Hubert
- 2012: Bram Ghuys
- 2013: Bram Ghuys
- 2014: Bram Ghuys
- 2015: Fabiano Kalandula
- 2016: Bram Ghuys

== Brazil ==
- 2001: Fabricio Romero de Azevedo
- 2002: Fabricio Romero de Azevedo
- 2003: Jesse de Lima
- 2004: Jesse de Lima
- 2005: Baptista Fábio Resende
- 2006: Jesse de Lima
- 2007: Jesse de Lima
- 2008: Jesse de Lima
- 2009: Jesse de Lima
- 2010: Jesse de Lima
- 2011: Rafael Uchona dos Santo

== Bulgaria ==
- 1980: Atanas Mladenov
- 1981: Georgi Gadzhev
- 1982: Atanas Mladenov
- 1983: Rumen Yotsov
- 1984: Georgi Gadzhev
- 1985: Valentin Gatov
- 1986: Georgi Dakov
- 1987: Georgi Dakov
- 1988: Georgi Dakov
- 1989: Kotzo Kostov
- 1990: Georgi Dakov
- 1991: Georgi Dakov
- 1992: Robert Marinov
- 1993: Robert Marinov
- 1994: Dimitar Toychev
- 1995: Ivan Ivanov
- 1996: Georgi Getov
- 1997: Metin Dormushev
- 1998: Metin Dormushev
- 1999: Ivan Varbanov
- 2000: Angel Kararadev
- 2001: Angel Kararadev
- 2002: Georgi Getov
- 2003: Georgi Getov
- 2004: Georgi Getov
- 2005: Stoyan Kekov
- 2006: Stefan Altanov

== Canada ==
- 1969: Wild Wedmann
- 1975: Richard Cuttell
- 1980: Claude Ferragne
- 1981: Milton Ottey
- 1982: Milton Ottey
- 1983: Milton Ottey
- 1984: Milton Ottey
- 1985: Alain Metellus
- 1986: Milton Ottey
- 1987: Milton Ottey
- 1988: Milton Ottey
- 1989: Alain Metellus
- 1990: Cory Siermachesky
- 1991: Vinton Bennett
- 1992: Cory Siermachesky
- 1993: Alex Zaliauskas
- 1994: Cory Siermachesky
- 1995: Charles Lefrançois
- 1996: Kwaku Boateng
- 1997: Mark Boswell
- 1998: Kwaku Boateng
- 1999: Kwaku Boateng
- 2000: Mark Boswell
- 2001: Mark Boswell
- 2002: Mark Boswell
- 2003: Mark Boswell
- 2004: Mark Boswell
- 2005: Kwaku Boateng
- 2006: Kwaku Boateng
- 2007: Michael Mason
- 2008: Michael Mason
- 2009: Derek Watkins
- 2010: Derek Drouin
- 2011: Mark Dillon
- 2012: Derek Drouin
- 2013: Derek Drouin
- 2014: Derek Drouin
- 2015: Derek Drouin
- 2016: Derek Drouin
- 2017: Michael Mason

== PR China ==
- 1988: Zhu Jianhua
- 1989: Liu Yunpeng
- 1990: Zhou Zhongge
- 1991: Xu Yang
- 1992: Xu Yang
- 1993: Xu Yang
- 1994: Tao Xu
- 1995: Bi Hongyong
- 1996: Niu Jiang
- 1997: Bi Hongyong
- 1998: Zhou Zhongge
- 1999: Wang Zhouzhou
- 2000: Zhou Zhongge
- 2001: Zhou Zhongge
- 2002: Wang Zhouzhou
- 2003: Wang Zhouzhou
- 2004: Liu Yang
- 2005: Zhang Shufeng

== Cuba ==
- 1986: Javier Sotomayor
- 1987: Javier Sotomayor
- 1988: Javier Sotomayor
- 1989: Javier Sotomayor
- 1990: Lázaro Chacón
- 1991: Javier Sotomayor
- 1992: Javier Sotomayor
- 1993: Javier Sotomayor
- 1994: Javier Sotomayor
- 1995: Javier Sotomayor
- 1996: Andrés Leal
- 1997: Andrés Leal
- 1998: Javier Sotomayor
- 1999: Javier Sotomayor
- 2000: Lázaro Suárez
- 2001: Javier Sotomayor
- 2002: Yordán Lugones
- 2003: Dailen Ortega
- 2004: Yunier Carrillo
- 2005: Lisvany Pérez
- 2006: Víctor Moya

== Denmark ==
- 1980: Jesper Tørring
- 1981: Leon Axen
- 1982: Flemming Vejsnæs
- 1983: René Tyranski Nielsen
- 1984: René Tyranski Nielsen
- 1985: Stig Oxholm
- 1986: René Tyranski Nielsen
- 1987: Lars Bach Jensen
- 1988: Michael Mikkelsen
- 1989: Michael Mikkelsen
- 1990: Michael Mikkelsen
- 1991: Michael Mikkelsen
- 1992: Michael Mikkelsen
- 1993: Lars Werge Andersen
- 1994: Michael Mikkelsen
- 1995: Lars Werge Andersen
- 1996: Michael Mikkelsen
- 1997: Michael Mikkelsen
- 1998: Anders Møller
- 1999: Michael Odgård
- 2000: Christoffer Holst
- 2001: Anders Møller
- 2002: Jens Møller Boeriis
- 2003: Anders Black
- 2004: Anders Black
- 2005: Anders Black
- 2006: Jens Møller Boeriis
- 2007: Jens Møller Boeriis

== Estonia ==
- 1917*: Sergei Rutkovski
- 1918*: Artur Proos
- 1919*: Bernhard Abrams
- 1920: Aleksander Klumberg
- 1921: Aleksander Klumberg
- 1922: Aleksander Klumberg
- 1923: Aleksander Klumberg
- 1924: Aleksander Klumberg
- 1925: Paul Steinberg
- 1926: Evald Roht
- 1927: Aleksander Klumberg
- 1928: Evald Roht
- 1929: Evald Kink
- 1930: Gustav Sule
- 1931: Gert Schmidt
- 1932: Gert Schmidt
- 1933: Aksel Kuuse
- 1934: Gert Schmidt
- 1935: Aksel Kuuse
- 1936: Aksel Kuuse
- 1937: Aksel Kuuse
- 1938: Olev Kaldre
- 1939: Olev Kaldre
- 1940: Lembit Kiisa
- 1941: -
- 1942: Viktor Palango
- 1943: Viktor Palango
- 1944: Viktor Palango
- 1945: Ants Kalda
- 1946: Erich Pilliroog
- 1947: Erich Pilliroog
- 1948: Erich Pilliroog
- 1949: Ülo Raidma
- 1950: Heino Apart
- 1951: Heino Apart
- 1952: Heino Apart
- 1953: Uno Palu
- 1954: Juhan Unger
- 1955: Ivo Jürviste
- 1956: Juhan Unger
- 1957: Rein Ellermaa
- 1958: Rein Ellermaa
- 1959: Jaak Ilves
- 1960: Rein Ellermaa
- 1961: Rein Ellermaa
- 1962: Valdeko Ruven
- 1963: Igor Kurve
- 1964: Igor Kurve
- 1965: Jüri Tarmak
- 1966: Jüri Tarmak
- 1967: Jüri Tarmak
- 1968: Vello Lumi
- 1969: Toomas Berendsen
- 1970: Valeri Peterson
- 1971: Andres Külvand
- 1972: Vello Lumi
- 1973: Villu Mengel
- 1974: Heiki Kask
- 1975: Vello Lumi
- 1976: Vello Lumi
- 1977: Heiki Kask
- 1978: Tiit Pahapill
- 1979: Tiit Pahapill
- 1980: Tiit Pahapill
- 1981: Ain Evard
- 1982: Ain Evard
- 1983: Tarmo Valgepea
- 1984: Kalev Martsepp
- 1985: Ain Evard
- 1986: Ain Evard
- 1987: Ain Evard
- 1988: Ain Evard
- 1989: Ain Evard
- 1990: Ain Evard
- 1991: Ain Evard
- 1992: Ain Evard
- 1993: Ain Evard
- 1994: Ain Evard
- 1995: Ramon Kaju
- 1996: Ramon Kaju
- 1997: Marko Turban
- 1998: Ramon Kaju
- 1999: Ramon Kaju
- 2000: Marko Aleksejev
- 2001: Ramon Kaju
- 2002: Marko Aleksejev
- 2003: Marko Aleksejev
- 2004: Marko Aleksejev
- 2005: Marko Aleksejev
- 2006: Marko Aleksejev
- 2007: Marko Aleksejev
- 2008: Karl Lumi
- 2009: Karl Lumi
- 2010: Karl Lumi
- 2011: Karl Lumi
- 2012: Karl Lumi
- 2013: Karl Lumi
- 2014: Hendrik Lepik
- 2015: Karl Lumi
- 2016: Karl Lumi
- 2017: Karl Lumi
- 2018: Karl Lumi
- 2019: Karl Lumi
- 2020: Kristjan Tafenau
- 2021: Hendrik Lillemets
- 2022: Hendrik Lillemets

* unofficial championships

== Finland ==
- 1980: Ossi Aura
- 1981: Juha Porkka
- 1982: Mikko Levola
- 1983: Jouko Kilpi
- 1984: Erkki Niemi
- 1985: Mikko Levola
- 1986: Timo Ruuskanen
- 1987: Mikko Levola
- 1988: Veli-Pekka Kokkonen
- 1989: Mikko Levola
- 1990: Matti Viitala
- 1991: Juha Isolehto
- 1992: Juha Isolehto
- 1993: Juha Isolehto
- 1994: Juha Isolehto
- 1995: Juha Isolehto
- 1996: Oskari Frösén
- 1997: Juha Isolehto
- 1998: Mika Polku
- 1999: Oskari Frösén
- 2000: Mika Polku
- 2001: Mika Polku
- 2002: Oskari Frösén
- 2003: Mika Polku
- 2004: Oskari Frösén
- 2005: Oskari Frösén
- 2006: Oskari Frösén
- 2007: Oskari Frösén
- 2008: Oskari Frösén
- 2009: Oskari Frösén
- 2010: Osku Torro
- 2011: Jussi Viita

== France ==
- 1980: Paul Tanon
- 1981: Franck Bonnet
- 1982: Franck Verzy
- 1983: Moussa Sagna Fall (SEN)
- 1984: Franck Verzy
- 1985: Dominique Hernandez
- 1986: Franck Verzy
- 1987: Jean-Charles Gicquel
- 1988: Dominique Hernandez
- 1989: Joël Vincent
- 1990: Jean-Charles Gicquel
- 1991: Joël Vincent
- 1992: Joël Vincent
- 1993: Xavier Robilliard
- 1994: Jean-Charles Gicquel
- 1995: Jean-Charles Gicquel
- 1996: Didier Detchénique
- 1997: Didier Detchénique
- 1998: Didier Detchénique
- 1999: Mustapha Raïfak
- 2000: Dieudonné Opota
- 2001: Grégory Gabella
- 2002: Dieudonné Opota
- 2003: Joan Charmant
- 2004: Grégory Gabella
- 2005: Grégory Gabella
- 2006: Mickaël Hanany
- 2007: Mickaël Hanany
- 2008: Mathias Cianci
- 2009: Mickaël Hanany

== Germany ==
=== East Germany ===
- 1980: Gerd Wessig
- 1981: Rolf Beilschmidt
- 1982: Jörg Freimuth
- 1983: Andreas Sam
- 1984: Gerd Wessig
- 1985: Gerd Wessig
- 1986: Gerd Wessig
- 1987: Matthias Grebenstein
- 1988: Gerd Wessig
- 1989: Gerd Wessig
- 1990: Uwe Bellmann

=== West Germany ===
- 1980: Dietmar Mögenburg
- 1981: Dietmar Mögenburg
- 1982: Dietmar Mögenburg
- 1983: Dietmar Mögenburg
- 1984: Dietmar Mögenburg
- 1985: Dietmar Mögenburg
- 1986: Carlo Thränhardt
- 1987: Dietmar Mögenburg
- 1988: Dietmar Mögenburg
- 1989: Dietmar Mögenburg
- 1990: Dietmar Mögenburg

=== Unified Germany ===
- 1991: Carlo Thränhardt
- 1992: Ralf Sonn
- 1993: Hendrik Beyer
- 1994: Hendrik Beyer
- 1995: Hendrik Beyer
- 1996: Wolfgang Kreissig
- 1997: Martin Buss
- 1998: Martin Buss
- 1999: Martin Buss
- 2000: Wolfgang Kreissig
- 2001: Martin Buss
- 2002: Martin Buss
- 2003: Roman Fricke
- 2004: Roman Fricke
- 2005: Eike Onnen
- 2006: Eike Onnen
- 2007: Benjamin Lauckner
- 2008: Raúl Spank
- 2009: Eike Onnen
- 2010: Raúl Spank
- 2011: Raúl Spank
- 2012: Eike Onnen
- 2013: Matthias Haverney
- 2014: Martin Günther
- 2015: David Nopper

== Great Britain ==
- 1980: Carlo Thränhardt (FRG)
- 1981: James Frazier (USA)
- 1982: Takao Sakamoto (JPN)
- 1983: Leo Williams (USA)
- 1984: Francisco Centelles (CUB)
- 1985: Milton Ottey (CAN)
- 1986: Geoff Parsons
- 1987: Floyd Manderson
- 1988: Geoff Parsons
- 1989: Dalton Grant
- 1990: Dalton Grant
- 1991: Hollis Conway (USA)
- 1992: Steve Smith
- 1993: Tim Forsyth (AUS)
- 1994: Brendan Reilly
- 1995: Steve Smith
- 1996: Steve Smith
- 1997: Mark Mandy (IRL)
- 1998: Dalton Grant
- 1999: Steve Smith
- 2000: Ben Challenger
- 2001: Ben Challenger
- 2002: Dalton Grant
- 2003: Ben Challenger
- 2004: Ben Challenger
- 2005: Ben Challenger
- 2006: Martyn Bernard
- 2007: Tom Parsons
- 2008: Tom Parsons
- 2009: Germaine Mason
- 2010: Martyn Bernard
- 2011: Tom Parsons
- 2012: Robert Grabarz

== Greece ==
- 1983: Panayotis Panayos
- 1984: Dimitrios Kattis
- 1985: Kosmas Michalopoulos
- 1986: Kosmas Michalopoulos
- 1987: Panayotis Kondaxakis
- 1988: Lambros Papakostas
- 1989: Kosmas Michalopoulos
- 1990: Lambros Papakostas
- 1991: Lambros Papakostas
- 1992: Lambros Papakostas
- 1993: Lambros Papakostas
- 1994: Dimitrios Kokotis
- 1995: Lambros Papakostas
- 1996: Ioannis Yantsios
- 1997: Lambros Papakostas
- 1998: Dimitrios Kokotis
- 1999: Konstantinos Liapis
- 2000: Lambros Papakostas
- 2001: Dimitrios Syrakos
- 2002: Ioannis Constantinou (CYP)
- 2003: Ioannis Constantinou (CYP)
- 2004: Dimitrios Syrakos
- 2005: Kyriacos Ioannou (CYP)
- 2006: Nikolaos Giosis
- 2007: Kyriacos Ioannou (CYP)
- 2008: Konstadinos Baniotis
- 2009: Konstadinos Baniotis
- 2010: Konstadinos Baniotis
- 2011: Konstadinos Baniotis
- 2012: Dimitrios Chondrokoukis
- 2013: Konstadinos Baniotis
- 2014: Antonios Mastoras

== Hungary ==
- 1980: Zoltán Társi
- 1981: István Széles
- 1982: Tibor Gerstenbrein
- 1983: István Gibicsár
- 1984: István Gibicsár
- 1985: István Gibicsár
- 1986: Gyula Németh
- 1987: Ferenc Pál
- 1988: Benõ Bese
- 1989: Gyula Németh
- 1990: Benõ Bese
- 1991: András Tresch
- 1992: Péter Deutsch
- 1993: Péter Deutsch
- 1994: Zoltán Bakler
- 1995: Péter Deutsch
- 1996: István Kovács
- 1997: István Kovács
- 1998: Attila Zsivoczky
- 1999: Gergely Bata
- 2000: Román Fehér
- 2001: Román Fehér
- 2002: Román Fehér
- 2003: László Boros
- 2004: László Boros
- 2005: László Boros
- 2006: László Boros
- 2007: Árpád Lehoczky
- 2008: Olivér Harsányi
- 2009: Olivér Harsányi
- 2010: Dávid Fajoyomi
- 2011: Olivér Harsányi
- 2012: Olivér Harsányi
- 2013: Péter Bakosi
- 2014: Péter Bakosi

== Italy ==
- 1980: Massimo Di Giorgio
- 1981: Oscar Raise
- 1982: Massimo Di Giorgio
- 1983: Gianni Davito
- 1984: Paolo Borghi
- 1985: Luca Toso
- 1986: Gianni Davito
- 1987: Daniele Pagani
- 1988: Luca Toso
- 1989: Marcello Benvenuti
- 1990: Daniele Pagani
- 1991: Fabrizio Borellini
- 1992: Roberto Ferrari
- 1993: Ettore Ceresoli
- 1994: Roberto Ferrari
- 1995: Ettore Ceresoli
- 1996: Alessandro Canale
- 1997: Alessandro Canale
- 1998: Ivan Bernasconi
- 1999: Ivan Bernasconi
- 2000: Alessandro Talotti
- 2001: Giulio Ciotti
- 2002: Giulio Ciotti
- 2003: Andrea Bettinelli
- 2004: Alessandro Talotti
- 2005: Nicola Ciotti
- 2006: Giulio Ciotti
- 2007: Filippo Campioli
- 2008: Filippo Campioli
- 2009: Nicola Ciotti
- 2010: Filippo Campioli
- 2011: Silvano Chesani
- 2012: Gianmarco Tamberi
- 2013: Marco Fassinotti
- 2014: Gianmarco Tamberi
- 2015: Marco Fassinotti
- 2016: Gianmarco Tamberi
- 2017: Eugenio Meloni
- 2018: Gianmarco Tamberi
- 2019: Stefano Sottile
- 2020: Gianmarco Tamberi
- 2021: Marco Fassinotti
- 2022: Gianmarco Tamberi

== Japan ==
- 1980: Takeyoshi Sawa
- 1981: Takao Sakamoto
- 1982: Takao Sakamoto
- 1983: Takao Sakamoto
- 1984: Takao Sakamoto
- 1985: Shuji Ujino
- 1986: Shuji Ujino
- 1987: Motochika Inoue
- 1988: Takao Sakamoto
- 1989: Takahisa Yoshida
- 1990: Sorin Matei (ROM)
- 1991: Troy Kemp (BAH)
- 1992: Takahisa Yoshida
- 1993: Satoru Nonaka
- 1994: Takahisa Yoshida
- 1995: Michiya Onoue
- 1996: Tomohiro Nomura
- 1997: Takahisa Yoshida
- 1998: Shigeki Toyoshima
- 1999: Takahisa Yoshida
- 2000: Takahisa Yoshida
- 2001: Takahiro Kimino
- 2002: Takahiro Uchida
- 2003: Naoyuki Daigo
- 2004: Satoru Kubota
- 2005: Naoyuki Daigo
- 2006: Naoyuki Daigo
- 2007: Naoyuki Daigo
- 2008: Hikaru Tsuchiya
- 2009: Naoyuki Daigo
- 2010: Hiromi Takahari
- 2011: Naoto Tobe
- 2012: Hiromi Takahari
- 2013: Hiromi Takahari
- 2014: Takashi Eto
- 2015: Naoto Tobe
- 2016: Takashi Eto
- 2017: Takashi Eto
- 2018: Takashi Eto
- 2019: Naoto Tobe
- 2020: Tomohiro Shinno

== Latvia ==
- 1991: Normunds Sietiņš
- 1992: Normunds Sietiņš
- 1993: Gints Klepeckis
- 1994: Normunds Sietiņš
- 1995: Pēteris Valdmanis
- 1996: Rojs Piziks
- 1997: Pēteris Valdmanis
- 1998: Pēteris Valdmanis
- 1999: Alvis Ērglis
- 2000: Alvis Ērglis
- 2001: Māris Prikulis
- 2002: Raivis Broks
- 2003: Kārlis Valdmanis
- 2004: Normunds Pūpols
- 2005: Normunds Pūpols
- 2006: Normunds Pūpols
- 2007: Normunds Pūpols
- 2008: Normunds Pūpols
- 2009: Normunds Pūpols
- 2010: Toms Andersons

== Lithuania ==
- 1990: Rolandas Verkys
- 1991: Rolandas Verkys
- 1992: Arûnas Stankaitis
- 1993: Rolandas Verkys
- 1994: Gintaras Varanauskas
- 1995: Gintaras Varanauskas
- 1996: Rolandas Verkys
- 1997: Gintaras Varanauskas
- 1998: Mindaugas Rutkauskas
- 1999: Gintaras Varanauskas
- 2000: Deividas Rinkevičius
- 2001: Aurelijus Eirošius
- 2002: Aurelijus Eirošius
- 2003: Aurelijus Eirošius
- 2004: Modestas Žukauskas
- 2005: Nerijus Bužas
- 2006: Nerijus Bužas
- 2007: Rimantas Mėlinis
- 2008: Raivydas Stanys
- 2009: Raivydas Stanys

== Netherlands ==
- 1980: Ruud Wielart
- 1981: René van Loon
- 1982: Erik Rollenberg
- 1983: Erik Rollenberg
- 1984: Marco Schmidt
- 1985: Ruud Wielart
- 1986: Ruud Wielart
- 1987: Marco Schmidt
- 1988: Ruud Wielart
- 1989: Gustav Borremans
- 1990: Henk-Jan Gebben
- 1991: Bert Albers
- 1992: Sven Ootjers
- 1993: Bjorn Groen
- 1994: Sven Ootjers
- 1995: Wilbert Pennings
- 1996: Bjorn Groen
- 1997: Bjorn Groen
- 1998: Wilbert Pennings
- 1999: Wilbert Pennings
- 2000: Wilbert Pennings
- 2001: Wilbert Pennings
- 2002: Wilbert Pennings
- 2003: Wilbert Pennings
- 2004: Jan Peter Larsen
- 2005: Jan Peter Larsen
- 2006: Jan Peter Larsen
- 2007: Martijn Nuijens
- 2008: Jan Peter Larsen
- 2009: Martijn Nuijens
- 2010: Martijn Nuijens
- 2011: Douwe Amels
- 2012: Douwe Amels
- 2013: Douwe Amels
- 2014: Douwe Amels
- 2015: Jan Peter Larsen
- 2016: Jan Peter Larsen

== New Zealand ==
- 1980: Terry Lomax
- 1981: Dave McDonald
- 1982: Roger Te Puni
- 1983: Roger Te Puni
- 1984: Roger Te Puni
- 1985: Roger Te Puni
- 1986: Roger Te Puni
- 1987: Roger Te Puni
- 1988: Steven Hollings
- 1989: Roger Te Puni
- 1990: Jeff Brown
- 1991: Roger Te Puni
- 1992: Roger Te Puni
- 1993: Roger Te Puni
- 1994: Roger Te Puni
- 1995: Glenn Howard
- 1996: Glenn Howard
- 1997: Glenn Howard
- 1998: Glenn Howard
- 1999: Glenn Howard
- 2000: Glenn Howard
- 2001: Glenn Howard
- 2002: Bae Kyung-Ho (KOR)
- 2003: Glenn Howard
- 2004: Bae Kyung-Ho (KOR)
- 2005: Ben Giles
- 2006: Billy Crayford
- 2007: Grant Knaggs
- 2008: Duncan Noble
- 2009: Billy Crayford
- 2010: Billy Crayford
- 2011: Billy Crayford
- 2012: Billy Crayford
- 2013: Billy Crayford

== Norway ==
- 1980: Terje Totland
- 1981: Terje Totland
- 1982: Jan Hegland
- 1983: Terje Totland
- 1984: Terje Totland
- 1985: Bjørn Eskild Ødegaard
- 1986: Håkon Särnblom
- 1987: Gisle Ellingsen
- 1988: Håkon Särnblom
- 1989: Håkon Särnblom
- 1990: Håkon Särnblom
- 1991: Steinar Hoen
- 1992: Håkon Särnblom
- 1993: Steinar Hoen
- 1994: Steinar Hoen
- 1995: Steinar Hoen
- 1996: Steinar Hoen
- 1997: Steinar Hoen
- 1998: Steinar Hoen
- 1999: Bjørn Olsson
- 2000: Arjan Bos
- 2001: Jan Olav Husbyn
- 2002: Jon Sigurd Utgårdsløkken
- 2003: Jon Sigurd Utgårdsløkken
- 2004: Jon Sigurd Utgårdsløkken
- 2005: Andreas Aune Viken
- 2006: Steinar Grini

== Poland ==
- 1980: Jacek Wszoła
- 1981: Janusz Trzepizur
- 1982: Jacek Wszoła
- 1983: Janusz Trzepizur
- 1984: Jacek Wszoła
- 1985: Jacek Wszoła
- 1986: Dariusz Zielke
- 1987: Krzysztof Krawczyk
- 1988: Jacek Wszoła
- 1989: Artur Partyka
- 1990: Artur Partyka
- 1991: Artur Partyka
- 1992: Artur Partyka
- 1993: Artur Partyka
- 1994: Artur Partyka
- 1995: Artur Partyka
- 1996: Artur Partyka
- 1997: Artur Partyka
- 1998: Artur Partyka
- 1999: Artur Partyka
- 2000: Artur Partyka
- 2001: Grzegorz Sposób
- 2002: Grzegorz Sposób
- 2003: Aleksander Waleriańczyk
- 2004: Robert Wolski
- 2005: Michał Bieniek
- 2006: Grzegorz Sposób
- 2007: Aleksander Waleriańczyk
- 2008: Grzegorz Sposób
- 2009: Grzegorz Sposób
- 2010: Wojciech Theiner
- 2011: Piotr Śleboda
- 2012: Szymon Kiecana
- 2013: Szymon Kiecana
- 2014: Sylwester Bednarek
- 2015: Sylwester Bednarek
- 2016: Sylwester Bednarek
- 2017: Sylwester Bednarek
- 2018: Maciej Grynienko
- 2019: Sylwester Bednarek

== Portugal ==
- 1980: Vítor Mendes
- 1981: Vítor Mendes
- 1982: Vítor Mendes
- 1983: Vítor Mendes
- 1984: José Carlos Lima
- 1985: Vítor Mendes
- 1986: Luís Marto
- 1987: Luís Marto
- 1988: Fernando Esteves Costa
- 1989: Fernando Esteves Costa
- 1990: Fernando Esteves Costa
- 1991: Fernando Esteves Costa
- 1992: Fernando Esteves Costa
- 1993: Fernando Esteves Costa
- 1994: Fernando Esteves Costa
- 1995: Fernando Esteves Costa
- 1996: Rafael Gonçalves
- 1997: Pedro Raposo
- 1998: Fernando Esteves Costa
- 1999: Fernando Esteves Costa
- 2000: Jonas Mattes
- 2001: Rafael Gonçalves
- 2002: Jonas Mattes
- 2003: Paulo Gonçalves
- 2004: Rafael Gonçalves
- 2005: Rafael Gonçalves
- 2006: Carlos Pereira
- 2007: Paulo Gonçalves
- 2008: Paulo Gonçalves
- 2009: Ricardo Nunes
- 2010: Roman Guliy
- 2011: Paulo Gonçalves
- 2012: Roman Guliy

== Romania ==
- 1980: Adrian Proteasa
- 1981: Adrian Proteasa
- 1982: Sorin Matei
- 1983: Eugen-Cristian Popescu
- 1984: Sorin Matei
- 1985: Constantin Militaru
- 1986: Sorin Matei
- 1987: Eugen-Cristian Popescu
- 1988: Eugen-Cristian Popescu
- 1989: Eugen-Cristian Popescu
- 1990: Eugen-Cristian Popescu
- 1991: Sorin Matei
- 1992: Constantin Militaru
- 1993: Eugen-Cristian Popescu
- 1994: Eugen-Cristian Popescu
- 1995: Sorin Matei
- 1996: Ştefan Vasilache
- 1997: Robert Lungu
- 1998: Eugen-Cristian Popescu
- 1999: Eugen-Cristian Popescu
- 2000: Ştefan Vasilache
- 2001: Ştefan Vasilache
- 2002: Ştefan Vasilache
- 2003: Ştefan Vasilache
- 2004: Ştefan Vasilache
- 2005: Ştefan Vasilache
- 2006: Ştefan Vasilache

== Russia ==
- 1992: Vladimir Sokolov
- 1993: Aleksey Yemelin
- 1994: Leonid Pumalainen
- 1995: Grigoriy Fedorkov
- 1996: Aleksey Denisov
- 1997: Grigoriy Fedorkov
- 1998: Aleksey Krysin
- 1999: Vyacheslav Voronin
- 2000: Sergey Klyugin
- 2001: Sergey Klyugin
- 2002: Yaroslav Rybakov
- 2003: Yaroslav Rybakov
- 2004: Yaroslav Rybakov
- 2005: Vyacheslav Voronin
- 2006: Andrey Silnov
- 2007: Yaroslav Rybakov
- 2008: Yaroslav Rybakov
- 2009: Ivan Ukhov
- 2010: Aleksandr Shustov
- 2011: Aleksey Dmitrik
- 2012: Ivan Ukhov

== South Africa ==
- 1980: Reinhard Schiel
- 1981: Reinhard Schiel
- 1982: Christo de Wet
- 1983: Edwin Ludick
- 1984: Edwin Ludick
- 1985: Lambertus de Wilzem
- 1986: Christo de Wet
- 1987: Christo Vrey
- 1988: Gert Pieterse
- 1989: Wimpie Louw
- 1990: Louis Kotze
- 1991: Louis Kotze
- 1992: Louis Kotze
- 1993: Flippie van Vuuren
- 1994: Gidius Botha
- 1995: C.J. Roux
- 1996: C.J. Roux
- 1997: Gavin Lendis
- 1998: Gavin Lendis
- 1999: Malcolm Hendriks
- 2000: Jacques Freitag
- 2001: Jacques Freitag
- 2002: Jacques Freitag
- 2003: Ramsey Carelse
- 2004: Ramsey Carelse
- 2005: Jacques Freitag
- 2006: Ramsey Carelse
- 2007: Ramsey Carelse
- 2008: Hurbert de Beer
- 2009: Ramsey Carelse
- 2010: Calvin-Lee Maclangwe
- 2011: Hurbert de Beer
- 2012: Ruan Claasen
- 2013: Ruan Claasen
- 2014: Mpho Links
- 2015: Mpho Links
- 2016: Mpho Links
- 2017: Christopher Moleya
- 2018: Christopher Moleya

== Soviet Union ==
- 1980: Raimondas Kazlauskas
- 1981: Aleksandr Grigoryev
- 1982: Aleksey Demyanyuk
- 1983: Valeriy Sereda
- 1984: Viktor Malchugin
- 1985: Igor Paklin
- 1986: Valeriy Sereda
- 1987: Gennadiy Avdeyenko
- 1988: Gennadiy Avdeyenko
- 1989: Rudolf Povarnitsyn
- 1990: Aleksey Yemelin
- 1991: Igor Paklin
- 1992: Igor Paklin

== Spain ==
- 1980: Roberto Cabrejas
- 1981: Miguel Ángel Moral
- 1982: Roberto Cabrejas
- 1983: Miguel Ángel Moral
- 1984: Roberto Cabrejas
- 1985: Gustavo Becker
- 1986: Gustavo Becker
- 1987: Arturo Ortíz
- 1988: Arturo Ortíz
- 1989: Gustavo Becker
- 1990: Arturo Ortíz
- 1991: Arturo Ortíz
- 1992: Arturo Ortíz
- 1993: Arturo Ortíz
- 1994: Gustavo Becker
- 1995: Arturo Ortíz
- 1996: Arturo Ortíz
- 1997: Arturo Ortíz
- 1998: Ignacio Pérez
- 1999: Javier Villalobos
- 2000: David Antona
- 2001: Javier Villalobos
- 2002: Ignacio Pérez
- 2003: Javier Bermejo
- 2004: Javier Bermejo
- 2005: Javier Bermejo
- 2006: David Antona
- 2007: Javier Bermejo
- 2008: Javier Bermejo
- 2009: Javier Bermejo
- 2010: Javier Bermejo
- 2011: Miguel Angel Sancho
- 2012: Javier Bermejo
- 2013: Simón Siverio
- 2014: Miguel Angel Sancho

== Sweden ==
- 1980: Jan From
- 1981: Patrik Sjöberg
- 1982: Patrik Sjöberg
- 1983: Patrik Sjöberg
- 1984: Patrik Sjöberg
- 1985: Patrik Sjöberg
- 1986: Patrik Sjöberg
- 1987: Patrik Sjöberg
- 1988: Mats Kollbrink
- 1989: Patrik Sjöberg
- 1990: Thomas Eriksson
- 1991: Thomas Eriksson
- 1992: Patrick Thavelin
- 1993: Patrick Thavelin
- 1994: Patrick Thavelin
- 1995: Staffan Strand
- 1996: Staffan Strand
- 1997: Staffan Strand
- 1998: Stefan Holm
- 1999: Stefan Holm
- 2000: Stefan Holm
- 2001: Stefan Holm
- 2002: Stefan Holm
- 2003: Stefan Holm
- 2004: Stefan Holm
- 2005: Stefan Holm
- 2006: Stefan Holm
- 2007: Stefan Holm
- 2008: Stefan Holm

== Ukraine ==
- 1992: Yuriy Sergiyenko
- 1993: Viacheslav Tyrtyshnik
- 1994: Yuriy Sergiyenko
- 1995: Serhiy Kolesnyk
- 1996: Viacheslav Tyrtyshnik
- 1997: Oleg Vorobey (BLR)
- 1998: Viacheslav Tyrtyshnik
- 1999: Serhiy Dymchenko
- 2000: Andriy Sokolovskyy
- 2001: Andriy Sokolovskyy
- 2002: Ruslan Hlivinskiy
- 2003: Andriy Sokolovskyy
- 2004: Andriy Sokolovskyy
- 2005: Yuriy Krymarenko
- 2006: Andriy Sokolovskyy
- 2007: Viktor Shapoval
- 2008: Yuriy Krymarenko
- 2009: Viktor Shapoval
- 2010: Dmytro Dem'yanyuk
- 2011: Bohdan Bondarenko
- 2012: Andriy Protsenko
- 2013: Yuriy Krymarenko
- 2014: Dmytro Yakovenko
- 2015: Dmytro Yakovenko
- 2016: Dmytro Yakovenko
- 2017: Viktor Lonskyy
- 2018: Andriy Protsenko
- 2019: Andriy Protsenko
- 2020: Andriy Protsenko

== United States ==
- 1980: Franklin Jacobs
- 1981: Tyke Peacock
- 1982: Milton Ottey (CAN)
  Benn Fields
- 1983: Dwight Stones
- 1984: Jim Howard
- 1985: Brian Stanton
- 1986: Doug Nordquist
- 1987: Jerome Carter
- 1988: Doug Nordquist
- 1989: Brian Brown
- 1990: Hollis Conway
- 1991: Hollis Conway
- 1992: Hollis Conway
- 1993: Hollis Conway
- 1994: Hollis Conway
- 1995: Charles Austin
- 1996: Charles Austin
- 1997: Charles Austin
- 1998: Charles Austin
- 1999: Charles Austin
- 2000: Charles Austin
- 2001: Nathan Leeper
- 2002: Nathan Leeper
- 2003: Jamie Nieto
- 2004: Jamie Nieto
- 2005: Matt Hemingway
- 2006: Tora Harris
- 2007: Jim Dilling
- 2008: Jesse Williams
- 2009: Tora Harris
- 2010: Jesse Williams
- 2011: Jesse Williams
- 2012: Jamie Nieto
- 2013: Erik Kynard
- 2014: Erik Kynard
- 2015: Erik Kynard
- 2016: Erik Kynard
- 2017: Bryan McBride
- 2018: Jeron Robinson
- 2019: Jeron Robinson
- 2020:
- 2022: Shelby McEwen

== Yugoslavia ==
- 1980: Danial Temim
- 1981: Danial Temim
- 1982: Novica Čanović
- 1983: Novica Čanović
- 1984: Novica Čanović
- 1985: Sašo Apostolovski
- 1986: Novica Čanović
- 1987: Novica Čanović
- 1988: Miha Prijon
- 1989: Sašo Apostolovski
- 1990: Stevan Zorić
- 1991: Momir Stefanović
- 1992: Stevan Zorić
- 1993: Dragutin Topić
- 1994: Stevan Zorić
- 1995: Stevan Zorić
- 1996: Dragutin Topić
- 1997: Đorđe Niketić
- 1998: Đorđe Niketić
- 1999: Dragutin Topić
- 2000: Dragutin Topić
- 2001: Đorđe Niketić
- 2002: Đorđe Niketić

== See also ==
- List of high jump national champions (women)
