= Zhou Zhongge =

Chinese high jumper and sports coach

Medal record

Men's athletics

Representing China

Asian Games
Gold medal – first place	1990 Beijing	High jump
Silver medal – second place	1998 Bangkok	High jump

Asian Championships
Gold medal – first place	1998 Fukuoka	High jump

Zhou Zhongge (Chinese: 周忠革; born 15 February 1967) is a Chinese track and field coach and former high jumper. His personal best was 2.33 m (7 ft 7 1/2 in), set in 1990. He was the gold medallist at the 1990 Asian Games and the 1998 Asian Games silver medallist. He was the winner at the Asian Athletics Championships in 1998.

A four-time national champion, he represented his country at the 1991 World Championships in Athletics and Asia at the 1998 IAAF World Cup. He went into coaching after retiring from competition and helped Zhang Shufeng to a continental medal.

== Career ==
Born in Beijing, he went to school in Chaoyang District in the city and rose to become the national high school champion in the high jump in 1986. At the age of twenty-three he won his first national title at the Chinese Athletics Championships, clearing a lifetime best and championship record of 2.33 m (7 ft 7 1/2 in) to succeed Liu Yunpeng. This gained him selection for the 1990 Asian Games, held in his hometown of Beijing, and he cleared 2.26 m (7 ft 4 3/4 in) to take the gold medal, seeing off a challenge from both national rival Liu and Japan's Takahisa Yoshida. This win made it three straight victories for China in that event, as Zhu Jianhua had won the previous two editions.

Zhou made his debut at a global at the 1991 World Championships in Athletics, being one of two selections alongside Xu Yang. Both jumpers achieved 2.20 m (7 ft 2 1/2 in) in the qualifying round and failed to progress. He did not compete at a high level for several years after 1991, with his one performance of note being a third-place finish at the 1993 Chinese Games, finishing behind Xu and Bi Hongyong.

His return to form came in the 1998 season. He claimed the second national title of his career, topping the field with a clearance of 2.28 m (7 ft 5 3/4 in). He regained his place as the continent's top jumper by winning the gold medal at the 1998 Asian Athletics Championships in July, getting the better of Lee Jin-Taek of South Korea and Malaysian Loo Kum Zee. His winning mark of 2.30 m (7 ft 6 1/2 in) was among the best of his career and the best performance at the championships since Zhu Jianhua's 1983 victory. He attempted to take his second continental title of the year at the 1998 Asian Games but his jump of 2.23 m (7 ft 3 3/4 in) in the final was not enough to beat Lee and he finished with a silver medal. In his last international outing that year, he placed fifth for Asia at the 1998 IAAF World Cup.

After 1998 his successes were limited to national level. He won two further national titles in 2000 and 2001 to bring his career total to four. He narrowly missed out on a gold medal on countback at the 2001 Chinese National Games, coming second in a final where all the medallists achieved the same height of 2.24 m (7 ft 4 in). In his last season of competition in 2002, he had a season's best of 2.22 m (7 ft 3 1/4 in) in Hyderabad.

Following his retirement from high jumping, he went into high jump coaching. Among his first charges was Zhang Shufeng. Zhang's performances had plateaued around 2.20 m (7 ft 2 1/2 in). Zhou's work with him over three years (focusing on explosive jumping power and lowering the tall athlete's centre of gravity at take-off) improved Zhang's jumping to the 2.30 m (7 ft 6 1/2 in) mark. As a result, Zhang won a bronze medal at the 2005 Asian Athletics Championships and won twice at the National Games.

== National titles ==
- Chinese Athletics Championships
  - High jump: 1990, 1998, 2000, 2001

== International competitions ==
Year	Competition	Venue	Position	Event	Notes
1990	Asian Games	Beijing, China	1st	High jump	2.26 m
1991	World Championships	Tokyo, Japan	15th (q)	High jump	2.20 m
1998	Asian Championships	Fukuoka, Japan	1st	High jump	2.30 m
1998	World Cup	Johannesburg, South Africa	5th	High jump	2.15 m
1998	Asian Games	Bangkok, Thailand	2nd	High jump	2.23 m

== See also ==
- List of high jump national champions (men)
