= 2001 European Athletics U23 Championships – Men's high jump =

The men's high jump event at the 2001 European Athletics U23 Championships was held in Amsterdam, Netherlands, at Olympisch Stadion on 12 and 14 July.

== Medalists ==
Gold	Rožle Prezelj; Slovenia
Silver	Aleksandr Veryutin; Belarus
Bronze	Fabrice Saint-Jean; France

== Results ==
=== Final ===
14 July

Rank	Name	Nationality	Attempts				Result	Notes
Rank	Name	Nationality	2.12	2.15	2.18	2.21	Result	Notes
1st place, gold medalist(s)	Rožle Prezelj	Slovenia	xo	o	xxo	o	2.21	
2nd place, silver medalist(s)	Aleksandr Veryutin	Belarus	o	xo	o	xxx	2.18	
3rd place, bronze medalist(s)	Fabrice Saint-Jean	France	o	o	xxo	xxx	2.18	
4	Paweł Gulcz	Poland	o	xxo	xxo	xxx	2.18	
5	Grégory Gabella	France	–	o	xxx		2.15	
6	Rob Mitchell	United Kingdom	o	xxx			2.12	
6	Marko Aleksejev	Estonia	o	xxx			2.12	
6	Nikolaos Giosis	Greece	o	xxx			2.12	
6	Ştefan Vasilache	Romania	o	xxx			2.12	
10	Daniel Graham	United Kingdom	xo	xxx			2.12	
10	Alessandro Talotti	Italy	xo	xxx			2.12	
	Samson-Dayo Oni	United Kingdom	xxx				NM	
	Tomasz Śmiałek	Poland	xxx				NM	

=== Qualifications ===
12 July
Qualifying 2.24 or 12 best to the Final

==== Group A ====
Rank	Name	Nationality	Result	Notes
1	Grégory Gabella	France	2.15	q
2	Paweł Gulcz	Poland	2.15	q
3	Rožle Prezelj	Slovenia	2.12	q
4	Marko Aleksejev	Estonia	2.12	q
4	Nikolaos Giosis	Greece	2.12	q
4	Alessandro Talotti	Italy	2.12	q
7	Daniel Graham	United Kingdom	2.12	q
	Branko Đuričić	Yugoslavia	NM	

==== Group B ====
Rank	Name	Nationality	Result	Notes
1	Samson-Dayo Oni	United Kingdom	2.15	q
2	Fabrice Saint-Jean	France	2.15	q
3	Ştefan Vasilache	Romania	2.12	q
4	Aleksandr Veryutin	Belarus	2.12	q
4	Rob Mitchell	United Kingdom	2.12	q
6	Tomasz Śmiałek	Poland	2.12	q
	Oleksiy Hordiyenko	Ukraine	NM	
	Einar Karl Hjartarson	Iceland	NM	

== Participation ==
According to an unofficial count, 16 athletes from 12 countries participated in the event.

- Belarus (1)
- Estonia (1)
- France (2)
- Greece (1)
- Iceland (1)
- Italy (1)
- Poland (2)
- Romania (1)
- Slovenia (1)
- Ukraine (1)
- United Kingdom (3)
- Yugoslavia (1)
