= 1999 European Athletics U23 Championships – Men's high jump =

The men's high jump event at the 1999 European Athletics U23 Championships was held in Gothenburg, Sweden, at Ullevi on 29 and 31 July 1999.

== Medalists ==
Gold	Ben Challenger; Great Britain
Silver	Andriy Sokolovskiy; Ukraine
Bronze	Javier Bermejo; Spain

== Results ==
=== Final ===
31 July

Rank	Name	Nationality	Attempts								Result	Notes
Rank	Name	Nationality	2.13	2.18	2.22	2.25	2.28	2.30	2.32	2.33	Result	Notes
1st place, gold medalist(s)	Ben Challenger	Great Britain	–	o	o	o	xo	o	x–	xx	2.30	CR
2nd place, silver medalist(s)	Andriy Sokolovskiy	Ukraine	o	o	o	xo	xxo	x–	xx		2.28	
3rd place, bronze medalist(s)	Javier Bermejo	Spain	ox	ox	xxo	xxx					2.22	
4	Daniel Graham	Great Britain	o	o	xxx						2.18	
5	Roman Fricke	Germany	xo	o	xxx						2.18	
5	Gennadiy Moroz	Belarus	xo	o	xxx						2.18	
7	Radovan Mišík	Slovakia	o	xo	xxx						2.18	
7	Dawid Jaworski	Poland	o	xo	xxx						2.18	
9	Joan Charmant	France	o	xxo	xxx						2.18	
10	Aleksandr Veryutin	Belarus	o	xxx							2.13	
10	Marcin Kaczocha	Poland	o	xxx							2.13	
10	Dimitris Makas	Greece	o	xxx							2.13	
13	Paweł Gulcz	Poland	xo	xxx							2.13	

=== Qualifications ===
29 July
Qualifying 2.22 or 12 best to the Final

==== Group A ====
Rank	Name	Nationality	Result	Notes
1	Ben Challenger	Great Britain	2.17	q
2	Javier Bermejo	Spain	2.17	q
2	Dimitris Makas	Greece	2.17	q
4	Joan Charmant	France	2.17	q
5	Marcin Kaczocha	Poland	2.17	q
6	Aleksandr Veryutin	Belarus	2.17	q
7	Gennadiy Moroz	Belarus	2.14	q
7	Paweł Gulcz	Poland	2.14	q
9	Roman Fricke	Germany	2.14	q
10	Svatoslav Ton	Czech Republic	2.10	

==== Group B ====
Rank	Name	Nationality	Result	Notes
1	Radovan Mišík	Slovakia	2.17	q
2	Andriy Sokolovskiy	Ukraine	2.17	q
3	Daniel Graham	Great Britain	2.14	q
4	Dawid Jaworski	Poland	2.14	q
5	Andrea Bettinelli	Italy	2.14	
6	Aleksey Lesnichiy	Belarus	2.14	
7	Ari-Pekka Lattu	Finland	2.14	
8	Raúl Lozano	Spain	2.10	
9	Marko Aleksejev	Estonia	2.10	
10	Yannick Tregaro	Sweden	2.05	

== Participation ==
According to an unofficial count, 20 athletes from 14 countries participated in the event.

- Belarus (3)
- Czech Republic (1)
- Estonia (1)
- Finland (1)
- France (1)
- Germany (1)
- Great Britain (2)
- Greece (1)
- Italy (1)
- Poland (3)
- Slovakia (1)
- Spain (2)
- Sweden (1)
- Ukraine (1)
