= Athletics at the 1995 Summer Universiade – Men's high jump =

Men's high jump event

The men's high jump event at the 1995 Summer Universiade was held on 30 August – 1 September at the Hakatanomori Athletic Stadium in Fukuoka, Japan.

== Medalists ==
Gold	Silver	Bronze
Dragutin Topić; Yugoslavia	Wolfgang Kreißig; Germany	Brendan Reilly; Great Britain

== Results ==
=== Qualification ===
Qualification: 2.20 m (Q) or at least 12 best (q) qualified for the final.

Rank	Group	Athlete	Nationality	1.90	1.95	2.00	2.05	2.10	2.13	2.16	Result	Notes
1	A	Wolfgang Kreißig	Germany	–	–	–	–	o	–	o	2.16	q
1	A	Brendan Reilly	Great Britain	–	–	–	–	o	–	o	2.16	q
1	A	Charles Lefrançois	Canada	–	–	–	–	o	–	o	2.16	q
1	A	Dragutin Topić	Yugoslavia	o	–	–	–	o	–	o	2.16	q
1	B	Lee Jin-taek	South Korea	–	–	–	–	o	–	o	2.16	q
1	B	Michiya Onoue	Japan	–	–	–	–	o	–	o	2.16	q
1	B	Allen Doakes	United States	–	–	–	–	o	–	o	2.16	q
8	A	Tomohiro Nomura	Japan	–	–	–	xo	o	–	xo	2.16	q
9	A	Dimitrios Kokotis	Greece	–	–	–	–	o	–	xxo	2.16	q
9	A	David Frazer	Australia	–	–	–	o	o	–	xxo	2.16	q
9	B	Tao Rui	China	–	–	–	o	o	–	xxo	2.16	q
12	B	Ian Garrett	Australia	–	o	–	o	–	o	–	2.13	q
13	A	Pēteris Valdmanis	Latvia	–	–	–	o	xo	o	xxx	2.13	
14	B	Richard Duncan	Canada	–	–	o	–	o	xo	xxx	2.13	
15	B	Işık Bayraktar	Turkey	–	–	o	–	o	–	xxx	2.10	
16	B	Mathias Ngadjadoum	Chad	–	o	o	xxo	xxx			2.05	
17	A	Immanuel Kharigub	Namibia	–	–	o	–	x			2.00	
18	B	Vikas Sheqran	India	xo	o	xxx					1.95	
	B	Aisea Tukutau	Tonga	xxx							NM	
	A	Antoine Burke	Ireland								DNS	
	A	Khemraj Naiko	Mauritius								DNS	
	B	Anthony Idiata	Nigeria								DNS	

=== Final ===
Rank	Athlete	Nationality	2.05	2.10	2.15	2.17	2.19	2.21	2.23	2.25	2.27	2.29	2.31	2.33	Result	Notes
1st place, gold medalist(s)	Dragutin Topić	Yugoslavia	–	o	o	–	xo	–	o	–	xo	o	x–	xx	2.29	
2nd place, silver medalist(s)	Wolfgang Kreißig	Germany	–	o	o	–	–	o	–	o	xo	xxo	xxx		2.29	
3rd place, bronze medalist(s)	Brendan Reilly	Great Britain	–	–	–	o	–	o	–	o	o	xxx			2.27	
4	Lee Jin-taek	South Korea	–	–	xo	–	–	o	–	xx–	o	xxx			2.27	
5	Michiya Onoue	Japan	–	o	o	–	–	xo	–	o	xo	xxx			2.27	
6	Allen Doakes	United States	–	o	–	o	–	xo	–	o	xxx				2.25	
7	Ian Garrett	Australia	–	–	o	–	–	–	o	–	xxx				2.23	
8	Charles Lefrançois	Canada	–	–	xo	x–	o	x	–xx						2.19	
9	Tomohiro Nomura	Japan	–	o	xxo	–	xo	xxx							2.19	
10	Dimitrios Kokotis	Greece	–	–	o	–	–	x–	xx						2.15	
10	Tao Rui	China	–	o	o	–	xxx								2.15	
12	David Frazer	Australia	o	xxo	xxx										2.10	
