= 1994 World Junior Championships in Athletics – Men's high jump =

The men's high jump event at the 1994 World Junior Championships in Athletics was held in Lisbon, United States, at Estádio Universitário de Lisboa on 22 and 24 July.

== Medalists ==
Gold	Jagan Hames; Australia
Silver	Antoine Burke; Ireland
Bronze	Mika Polku; Finland

== Results ==
=== Final ===
24 July

Rank	Name	Nationality	Result	Notes
1st place, gold medalist(s)	Jagan Hames	Australia	2.23	
2nd place, silver medalist(s)	Antoine Burke	Ireland	2.20	
3rd place, bronze medalist(s)	Mika Polku	Finland	2.20	
4	Attila Zsivoczky	Hungary	2.20	
5	Roland Stark	Germany	2.15	
6	Oskari Frösén	Finland	2.15	
7	Shunichi Kobayashi	Japan	2.10	
7	Stefan Holm	Sweden	2.10	
9	Tomohiro Nomura	Japan	2.10	
10	Henry Patterson	United States	2.10	
11	Bjørn Olsson	Norway	2.10	
12	Stuart Ohrland	United Kingdom	2.05	

=== Qualifications ===
22 Jul

==== Group A ====
Rank	Name	Nationality	Result	Notes
1	Antoine Burke	Ireland	2.15	q
2	Oskari Frösén	Finland	2.15	q
3	Stuart Ohrland	United Kingdom	2.15	q
4	Shunichi Kobayashi	Japan	2.15	q
5	Marcel Marie-Anne	France	2.10	
5	Yoval Bukchin	Israel	2.10	
7	Jordi Rofes	Spain	2.10	
8	Michal Majchrowicz	Poland	2.10	
9	Ola Carlsson	Sweden	2.10	
10	Jarrad Pozzi	Australia	2.05	
11	Oleg Sklyar	Azerbaijan	2.00	
12	Jeremy Fischer	United States	2.00	
13	Kang Myung-Soo	South Korea	2.00	
14	Esteve Martin	Andorra	1.90	
	Stephen Woodley	Bermuda	NH	

==== Group B ====
Rank	Name	Nationality	Result	Notes
1	Jagan Hames	Australia	2.15	q
1	Mika Polku	Finland	2.15	q
1	Roland Stark	Germany	2.15	q
1	Attila Zsivoczky	Hungary	2.15	q
5	Tomohiro Nomura	Japan	2.15	q
6	Bjørn Olsson	Norway	2.15	q
6	Stefan Holm	Sweden	2.15	q
6	Henry Patterson	United States	2.15	q
9	Yevgeniy Stekolshchikov	Russia	2.10	
10	Moise Siba	France	2.05	
11	James Brierley	United Kingdom	2.05	
11	Glenn Howard	New Zealand	2.05	
13	Daniel Talam	Kenya	2.00	
14	Younès Moudrik	Morocco	2.00	
15	Rodolfo Moog	Bolivia	1.95	
16	Olubunmi Robin-Coker	Sierra Leone	1.95	

== Participation ==
According to an unofficial count, 31 athletes from 23 countries participated in the event.

- Andorra (1)
- Australia (2)
- Azerbaijan (1)
- Bermuda (1)
- Bolivia (1)
- Finland (2)
- France (2)
- Germany (1)
- Hungary (1)
- Ireland (1)
- Japan (2)
- Kenya (1)
- Morocco (1)
- New Zealand (1)
- Norway (1)
- Poland (1)
- Russia (2)
- Sierra Leone (1)
- South Korea (1)
- Spain (1)
- Sweden (2)
- United Kingdom (2)
- United States (2)
