= 1997 European Athletics U23 Championships – Men's high jump =

The men's high jump event at the 1997 European Athletics U23 Championships was held in Turku, Finland, on 11 and 13 July 1997.

== Medalists ==
Gold	Staffan Strand; Sweden
Silver	Martin Buß; Germany
Bronze	Marcin Kaczocha; Poland

== Results ==
=== Final ===
13 July

Rank	Name	Nationality	Attempts								Result	Notes
Rank	Name	Nationality	2.10	2.15	2.18	2.21	2.24	2.26	2.28	2.31	Result	Notes
1st place, gold medalist(s)	Staffan Strand	Sweden	–	o	–	o	o	xo	o	xxx	2.28	
2nd place, silver medalist(s)	Martin Buß	Germany	–	o	o	o	o	xxx			2.24	
3rd place, bronze medalist(s)	Marcin Kaczocha	Poland	o	o	o	o	xo	xx–	x		2.24	
4	Ivan Vogul	Russia	o	o	xxo	o	xxo	xxx			2.24	
5	Mustapha Raifak	France	o	o	xo	o	xxx				2.21	
6	Szymon Kuźma	Poland	o	o	o	xxx					2.18	
6	Mika Polku	Finland	o	o	o	xxx					2.18	
8	Tomáš Ort	Czech Republic	o	o	xo	xxx					2.18	
9	Jordi Rofes	Spain	o	o	xxx						2.15	
10	James Brierley	Great Britain	o	xo	xxx						2.15	
10	Oskari Frösén	Finland	–	xo	–	xxx					2.15	
10	Antoine Burke	Ireland	o	xo	–	xxx					2.15	
13	Đorđe Niketić	Yugoslavia	o	xxx							2.10	

=== Qualifications ===
11 July
Qualify: first 12 to the Final

==== Group A ====
Rank	Name	Nationality	Result	Notes
1	Martin Buß	Germany	2.15	Q
1	Staffan Strand	Sweden	2.15	Q
3	Tomáš Ort	Czech Republic	2.15	Q
4	Jordi Rofes	Spain	2.15	Q
4	Marcin Kaczocha	Poland	2.15	Q
4	Mika Polku	Finland	2.15	Q
7	Moise Siba	France	2.10	
8	Ruslan Glivinskiy	Ukraine	2.05	

==== Group B ====
Rank	Name	Nationality	Result	Notes
1	Oskari Frösén	Finland	2.15	Q
1	Mustapha Raifak	France	2.15	Q
1	Ivan Vogul	Russia	2.15	Q
4	Đorđe Niketić	Yugoslavia	2.15	Q
5	Antoine Burke	Ireland	2.10	Q
5	James Brierley	Great Britain	2.10	Q
5	Szymon Kuźma	Poland	2.10	Q
8	Roman Fricke	Germany	2.05	

== Participation ==
According to an unofficial count, 16 athletes from 12 countries participated in the event.

- Czech Republic (1)
- Finland (2)
- France (2)
- Germany (2)
- Great Britain (1)
- Ireland (1)
- Poland (2)
- Russia (1)
- Spain (1)
- Sweden (1)
- Ukraine (1)
- Yugoslavia (1)
