= Athletics at the 1997 Summer Universiade – Men's high jump =

Men's high jump at the 1997 Summer Universiade

The men's high jump event at the 1997 Summer Universiade was held at the Stadio Cibali in Catania, Italy on 27 and 28 August.

== Medalists ==
Gold	Silver	Bronze
Lee Jin-taek; South Korea	Charles Lefrançois; Canada	Didier Detchénique; France

== Results ==
=== Qualification ===
Rank	Group	Athlete	Nationality	Result	Notes
1	?	Sergey Klyugin	Russia	2.23	
?	?	Gregory Walker	United States	2.20	
?	?	Christian Rhoden	Germany	2.20	
?	?	Lee Jin-taek	South Korea	2.20	
?	?	Charles Lefrançois	Canada	2.20	
?	?	Tomáš Janků	Czech Republic	2.20	
?	?	Ben Challenger	Great Britain	2.20	
?	?	Shane Lavy	United States	2.15	
?	?	Ramon Kaju	Estonia	2.15	
?	?	Ruslan Stipanov	Ukraine	2.15	
?	?	Marcin Kaczocha	Poland	2.15	
?	?	Didier Detchénique	France	2.15	
?	?	Xu Yang	China	2.15	
?	A	Ignacio Pérez	Spain	2.15	
?	?	Kim Tae-hoi	South Korea	2.15	
?	?	Abderrahmane Hammad	Algeria	2.10	
16	?	Mustapha Raifak	France	2.10	
?	?	Đorđe Niketić	Yugoslavia	2.10	
?	?	Svatoslav Ton	Czech Republic	2.10	
?	?	István Kovács	Hungary	2.10	
?	?	Eduard Rajter	Hungary	2.10	
?	?	César Ballesteros	Mexico	2.00	
?	?	Szymon Kuźma	Poland	2.00	
?	?	Kemal Güner	Turkey	2.00	
?	?	José Barahona	Panama	1.90	
?	?	Cheong Chi Fong	Macau	1.80	

=== Final ===
Rank	Athlete	Nationality	Result	Notes
1st place, gold medalist(s)	Lee Jin-taek	South Korea	2.32	
2nd place, silver medalist(s)	Charles Lefrançois	Canada	2.32	
3rd place, bronze medalist(s)	Didier Detchénique	France	2.28	
4	Tomáš Janků	Czech Republic	2.26	
5	Ramon Kaju	Estonia	2.23	
5	Sergey Klyugin	Russia	2.23	
7	Gregory Walker	United States	2.23	
7	Shane Lavy	United States	2.23	
9	Ruslan Stipanov	Ukraine	2.20	
10	Christian Rhoden	Germany	2.20	
11	Ben Challenger	Great Britain	2.10	
12	Marcin Kaczocha	Poland	2.10	
