= Athletics at the 1997 Summer Universiade – Men's 110 metres hurdles =

The men's 110 metres hurdles event at the 1997 Summer Universiade was held on 26 and 27 August at the Stadio Cibali in Catania, Italy.

== Medalists ==
Gold	Silver	Bronze
Andrey Kislykh; Russia	Jonathan N'Senga; Belgium	Dudley Dorival; United States

== Results ==
=== Heats ===
Held on 26 August
Wind:
Heat 1: -0.1 m/s, Heat 2: 0.0 m/s, Heat 3: +0.8 m/s, Heat 4: 0.0 m/s, Heat 5: +1.2 m/s

Rank	Heat	Athlete	Nationality	Time	Notes
1	3	Kenny Aladefa	Nigeria	13.64	Q
2	4	Dudley Dorival	United States	13.64	Q
3	2	Jonathan Nsenga	Belgium	13.67	Q
4	5	Andrey Kislykh	Russia	13.69	Q
5	1	Robin Korving	Netherlands	13.73	Q
6	1	Ralf Leberer	Germany	13.77	Q
7	4	Elmar Lichtenegger	Austria	13.78	Q
8	1	William Erese	Nigeria	13.79	Q
9	3	Ronald Mehlich	Poland	13.81	Q
10	1	Satoru Tanigawa	Japan	13.87	Q
11	3	Mauro Rossi	Italy	13.88	Q
12	4	Emerson Perin	Brazil	13.93	Q
13	5	Andrea Alterio	Italy	13.99	Q
14	4	Sven Ootjers	Netherlands	14.07	Q
15	2	Raphaël Monachon	Switzerland	14.11	Q
16	2	Krzysztof Mehlich	Poland	14.12	Q
17	5	Bai Yong	China	14.13	Q
18	5	Blaž Korent	Slovenia	14.18	Q
19	2	Zoran Miljuš	Croatia	14.19	Q
20	4	José Carmona	Puerto Rico	14.21	q
21	2	Ross Baillie	Great Britain	14.23	q
22	2	Chang Fu-sheng	Chinese Taipei	14.27	q
23	3	Márcio de Souza	Brazil	14.29	Q
24	3	Peter Nedelický	Slovakia	14.29	q
25	5	Vyacheslav Guba	Ukraine	14.36	
26	4	Anders Sækmose	Denmark	14.43	
27	5	Chen Chung-tao	Chinese Taipei	14.49	
28	1	Mohamed Boukrouna	Morocco	14.50	
29	1	Ophir Shmueli	Israel	14.56	
30	1	Yaroslav Fyodorov	Russia	14.64	
31	2	Anders Karlsson	Sweden	14.66	
32	1	Bowi Abdul Nacro	Burkina Faso	14.80	
33	4	Dmitriy Sereda	Belarus	14.8	
34	3	Raiea Khrasat	Jordan	15.61	
35	5	Lee To	Hong Kong	17.25	
	3	Anier García	Cuba	DNF	

=== Semifinals ===
Held on 27 August
Wind:
Heat 1: 0.0 m/s, Heat 2: +0.5 m/s, Heat 3: -0.2 m/s

Rank	Heat	Athlete	Nationality	Time	Notes
1	1	Jonathan Nsenga	Belgium	13.54	Q
2	1	Andrey Kislykh	Russia	13.57	Q
3	3	Dudley Dorival	United States	13.64	Q
4	2	Ralf Leberer	Germany	13.71	Q
5	2	Kenny Aladefa	Nigeria	13.71	Q
6	3	Robin Korving	Netherlands	13.76	Q
7	2	Elmar Lichtenegger	Austria	13.77	q
8	2	Sven Ootjers	Netherlands	13.81	q, PB
9	2	Emerson Perin	Brazil	13.81	
9	3	Ronald Mehlich	Poland	13.81	
11	3	William Erese	Nigeria	13.82	
12	2	Mauro Rossi	Italy	13.84	
13	1	Satoru Tanigawa	Japan	13.94	
14	1	Raphaël Monachon	Switzerland	13.95	
15	1	Andrea Alterio	Italy	13.98	
16	1	Chang Fu-sheng	Chinese Taipei	14.10	
17	3	Bai Yong	China	14.14	
18	2	Peter Nedelický	Slovakia	14.25	
19	2	Zoran Miljuš	Croatia	14.30	
20	3	Márcio de Souza	Brazil	14.31	
21	3	Blaž Korent	Slovenia	14.41	
22	1	Krzysztof Mehlich	Poland	14.44	
23	3	José Carmona	Puerto Rico	14.52	
24	1	Ross Baillie	Great Britain	14.56	

=== Final ===
Held on 27 August
Wind: -0.7 m/s

Rank	Athlete	Nationality	Time	Notes
1st place, gold medalist(s)	Andrey Kislykh	Russia	13.44	
2nd place, silver medalist(s)	Jonathan N'Senga	Belgium	13.51	
3rd place, bronze medalist(s)	Dudley Dorival	United States	13.53	
4	Robin Korving	Netherlands	13.70	
5	Elmar Lichtenegger	Austria	13.79	
6	Ralf Leberer	Germany	13.88	
7	Sven Ootjers	Netherlands	13.93	
8	Kenny Aladefa	Nigeria	14.10	
