= Shigeki Toyoshima =

Japanese high jumper

Personal information
- Nationality: Japanese
- Born: 5 March 1971 (age 55)

Sport
- Country: Japan
- Sport: Track and field
- Event: High jump

Achievements and titles
- Personal best: 2.27 m (1995)
Medal record
Men's athletics
Representing Japan
Asian Championships
Silver medal – second place	1991 Kuala Lumpur	High jump

Shigeki Toyoshima (born March 5, 1971) is a Japanese former high jumper. He was a bronze medallist in his event at the 1998 Asian Games, sharing the position with Malaysia's Loo Kum Zee with a jump of 2.19 m. He cleared the same height at the 1991 Asian Athletics Championships to take the silver medal. He twice competed at the IAAF World Indoor Championships (1997 and 1999).

At national level, he won once at the Japan Championships in Athletics, taking the title with a jump of 2.24 m in 1998. He also won at the National Sports Festival of Japan in 1994 with that same height.

== International competitions ==
Representing Japan
Year	Competition	Venue	Position	Event	Notes
1991	Asian Championships	Kuala Lumpur, Malaysia	2nd	High jump	2.19 m
1997	World Indoor Championships	Paris, France	28th (q)	High jump	2.15 m
1998	Asian Games	Bangkok, Thailand	3rd	High jump	2.19 m
1999	World Indoor Championships	Maebashi, Japan	—	High jump	NM

== National titles ==
- Japan Championships in Athletics
  - High jump: 1998
- National Sports Festival of Japan
  - High jump: 1994

== See also ==
- List of high jump national champions (men)
- List of Asian Games medalists in athletics
