= 1997 IAAF World Indoor Championships – Men's high jump =

The men's high jump event at the 1997 IAAF World Indoor Championships was held on March 8–9.

== Medalists ==
Gold	Silver	Bronze
Charles Austin; United States	Labros Papakostas; Greece	Dragutin Topić; Yugoslavia

== Results ==
=== Qualification ===
Qualification: 2.29 (Q) or at least 12 best performers (q) qualified for the final.

Rank	Group	Athlete	Nationality	2.10	2.15	2.20	2.24	2.27	2.29	Result	Notes
1	A	Charles Austin	United States	–	–	o	–	o	o	2.29	Q
2	A	Steinar Hoen	Norway	–	–	o	o	xxo	xxo	2.29	Q
3	A	Steve Smith	Great Britain	–	xxo	–	xxo	o	xxo	2.29	Q
4	A	Wolfgang Kreißig	Germany	–	o	o	o	o	xxx	2.27	q
5	A	Didier Detchénique	France	–	xo	o	o	o	xxx	2.27	q
5	B	Stefan Holm	Sweden	–	o	o	xo	o	–	2.27	q
5	B	Charles Lefrançois	Canada	–	o	xo	o	o	–	2.27	q, PB
8	B	Dalton Grant	Great Britain	–	–	o	o	xo	–	2.27	q
8	B	Labros Papakostas	Greece	–	–	o	o	xo	–	2.27	q
10	B	Jarosław Kotewicz	Poland	–	o	–	xo	xo	–	2.27	q
11	B	Dragutin Topić	Yugoslavia	–	o	xxo	o	xo	–	2.27	q
12	A	Arturo Ortiz	Spain	–	o	o	o	xxo	xxx	2.27	q
13	A	Konstantinos Liapis	Greece	o	xo	o	o	xxo	xxx	2.27	
14	A	Sergey Klyugin	Russia	o	o	o	o	xxx		2.24	
14	B	Brian Brown	United States	–	–	o	o	xxx		2.24	
16	B	Tim Forsyth	Australia	–	–	o	xo	xxx		2.24	
17	B	Svatoslav Ton	Czech Republic	o	o	xo	xxo	xxx		2.24	
18	A	Kwaku Boateng	Canada	–	–	o	xxx			2.20	
18	A	Ian Thompson	Bahamas	o	o	o	xxx			2.20	
20	A	Jan Janků	Czech Republic	–	xo	o	xxx			2.20	
20	A	Konstantin Matusevich	Israel	xo	o	o	xxx			2.20	
22	A	Mark Mandy	Ireland	o	o	xo	xxx			2.20	
22	A	Vyacheslav Tyrtyshnik	Ukraine	o	o	xo	xx–	x		2.20	
24	B	Itai Margalit	Israel	–	o	xxo				2.20	
25	B	Gustavo Becker	Spain	o	o	xxx				2.15	
25	B	István Kovács	Hungary	o	o	xxx				2.15	
27	A	Marko Turban	Estonia	xo	xo	xxx				2.15	
28	B	Shigeki Toyoshima	Japan	xo	xxo	xxx				2.15	
29	A	Lee Jin-taek	South Korea	o	xxx					2.10	
29	B	Hervé Ndi Ndi	France	o	–	xxx				2.10	
31	B	Elvir Krehmić	Bosnia and Herzegovina	xxo	xxx					2.10	
	B	Jean-Claude Rabbath	Lebanon							NM	
	B	Christian Rhoden	Germany							NM	

=== Final ===
Rank	Name	Nationality	2.15	2.20	2.25	2.29	2.32	2.35	2.41	Result	Notes
1st place, gold medalist(s)	Charles Austin	United States	–	o	–	o	xo	xxo	xxx	2.35	
2nd place, silver medalist(s)	Labros Papakostas	Greece	–	xo	–	o	xo	xxx		2.32	SB
3rd place, bronze medalist(s)	Dragutin Topić	Yugoslavia	–	–	xo	–	xxo	xxx		2.32	
4	Charles Lefrançois	Canada	–	o	o	o	xxx			2.29	PB
5	Wolfgang Kreißig	Germany	–	xo	o	xo	xxx			2.29	
6	Steve Smith	Great Britain	–	–	o	–	xx–	x		2.25	
6	Jarosław Kotewicz	Poland	o	–	o	–	xxx			2.25	
8	Steinar Hoen	Norway	–	o	xo	x–	xx			2.25	
8	Stefan Holm	Sweden	o	o	xo	–	xxx			2.25	
10	Dalton Grant	Great Britain	–	x–	xo	–	xxx			2.25	
11	Arturo Ortiz	Spain	o	xo	xxo	–	xxx			2.25	
12	Didier Detchénique	France	o	xo	xxx					2.20	
