= Alessandro Canale =

Alessandro Canale may refer to:

- Alessandro Canale (high jumper)
- Alessandro Canale (soccer)
