= Henderson Dottin =

Barbadian high jumper

Personal information
- Born: 4 January 1980 (age 46) Bridgetown, Barbados

Sport
- Sport: Track and field

Henderson Dottin (born 4 January 1980) is a Barbadian athlete specialising in the high jump. He won several medals at regional level.

Dottin is from Saint George, Barbados and arrived to Barbados via Cuba. He began by playing basketball before taking up high jump in 1998. He was an All-American jumper for the UTEP Miners track and field team, finishing 4th in the high jump at the 2004 NCAA Division I Indoor Track and Field Championships.

He has personal bests of 2.25 metres outdoors (2008) and 2.23 metres indoors (2003). Both are current national records.

== Competition record ==
Year	Competition	Venue	Position	Notes
Representing Barbados
1999	CARIFTA Games (U20)	Fort-de-France, Martinique	2nd	2.06 m
2001	Central American and Caribbean Championships	Guatemala City, Guatemala	1st	2.20 m
2002	Commonwealth Games	Manchester, United Kingdom	9th	2.15 m
2003	Central American and Caribbean Championships	St. George's, Grenada	3rd	2.15 m
2003	Pan American Games	Santo Domingo, Dom. Rep.	7th	2.16 m
2003	Universiade	Daegu, South Korea	6th	2.20 m
2005	Central American and Caribbean Championships	Nassau, Bahamas	5th	2.15 m
2006	Central American and Caribbean Games	Cartagena, Colombia	–	NM
2007	NACAC Championships	San Salvador, El Salvador	6th	2.05 m
2007	Pan American Games	Rio de Janeiro, Brazil	11th	2.15 m
2009	Central American and Caribbean Championships	Havana, Cuba	5th	2.13 m
2010	Central American and Caribbean Games	Mayagüez, Puerto Rico	4th	2.13 m
