= Charles Lefrançois =

Canadian high jumper (born 1972)

Personal information
- Born: December 19, 1972 (age 53) Montreal, Quebec, Canada
Medal record
Representing Canada
Summer Universiade
Silver medal – second place	1997 Catania	High jump

Charles Lefrançois (born December 19, 1972) is a retired high jumper from Canada, who represented his native country at the 1996 Summer Olympics in Atlanta, United States. He won the silver medal at the 1997 Summer Universiade. He is a seven-time national champion (1993−1998) for Canada in the men's high jump event.

== Competition record ==
Year	Competition	Venue	Position	Notes
Representing Canada and Quebec
1991	Pan American Junior Championships	Kingston, Jamaica	5th	2.13 m
1994	Jeux de la Francophonie	Bondoufle, France	4th	2.18 m
1994	Commonwealth Games	Victoria, British Columbia, Canada	16th (q)	2.10 m
1995	Pan American Games	Mar del Plata, Argentina	6th	2.15 m
1995	World Championships	Gothenburg, Sweden	31st (q)	2.15 m
1995	Universiade	Fukuoka, Japan	8th	2.19 m
1996	Olympic Games	Atlanta, United States	15th (q)	2.26 m
1997	World Indoor Championships	Paris, France	4th	2.29 m
1997	World Championships	Athens, Greece	15th (q)	2.23 m
1997	Universiade	Catania, Italy	2nd	2.32 m
2001	Jeux de la Francophonie	Ottawa, Ontario, Canada	–	NM
