= 2002 Asian Athletics Championships – Men's high jump =

The men's high jump event at the 2002 Asian Athletics Championships was held in Colombo, Sri Lanka on 12 August.

== Results ==
| Rank | Name | Nationality | Result | Notes |
|---|---|---|---|---|
| 1st place, gold medalist(s) | Cui Kai | China | 2.19 | |
| 2nd place, silver medalist(s) | Salem Nasser Bakheet | Bahrain | 2.15 | |
| 3rd place, bronze medalist(s) | Loo Kum Zee | Malaysia | 2.15 | =SB |
| 4 | Takahiro Uchida | Japan | 2.15 | |
| 5 | Manjula Kumara | Sri Lanka | 2.15 | |
| 6 | Nguyen Duy Bang | Vietnam | 2.10 | |
| 7 | Chen Hung-Chieh | Chinese Taipei | 2.10 | |
| 8 | Jean-Claude Rabbath | Lebanon | 2.10 | =SB |
| 9 | Khalil Khahil Ibrahim | Kuwait | 2.10 | PB |
| 10 | Sean Guevara | Philippines | 2.05 | PB |
| 11 | Salem Al-Anezi | Kuwait | 2.05 | |
| 12 | Ali Gujar Tariq | Pakistan | 1.95 | PB |
| | Ali Mohamed Al-Fadaaq Mahdi | Qatar | NM | |
| | Nalin Ratnasiri | Sri Lanka | NM | |
| | M.T. Indrawansa | Sri Lanka | NM | |
