= 2000 World Junior Championships in Athletics – Men's high jump =

The men's high jump event at the 2000 World Junior Championships in Athletics was held in Santiago, Chile, at Estadio Nacional Julio Martínez Prádanos on 18 and 19 October.

== Medalists ==
| Gold | Jacques Freitag; South Africa |
| Silver | Germaine Mason; Jamaica |
| Bronze | Tomasz Smialek; Poland |

== Results ==
=== Final ===
19 October

| Rank | Name | Nationality | Result | Notes |
|---|---|---|---|---|
| 1st place, gold medalist(s) | Jacques Freitag | South Africa | 2.24 | |
| 2nd place, silver medalist(s) | Germaine Mason | Jamaica | 2.24 | |
| 3rd place, bronze medalist(s) | Tomasz Smialek | Poland | 2.21 | |
| 4 | Jessé de Lima | Brazil | 2.18 | |
| 5 | Matthew Vincent | United States | 2.18 | |
| 6 | Andrey Chubsa | Belarus | 2.15 | |
| 7 | Mickaël Hanany | France | 2.10 | |
| 7 | Yohaav Shuster | Israel | 2.10 | |
| 7 | Alfred Neale | United States | 2.10 | |
| 10 | Luke Crawley | United Kingdom | 2.10 | |
| 11 | Jirí Krehula | Czech Republic | 2.05 | |
| 11 | Branko Ðuricic | Yugoslavia | 2.05 | |

=== Qualifications ===
18 October

==== Group A ====
| Rank | Name | Nationality | Result | Notes |
|---|---|---|---|---|
| 1 | Andrey Chubsa | Belarus | 2.13 | q |
| 1 | Mickaël Hanany | France | 2.13 | q |
| 1 | Germaine Mason | Jamaica | 2.13 | q |
| 4 | Jessé de Lima | Brazil | 2.13 | q |
| 4 | Matthew Vincent | United States | 2.13 | q |
| 6 | Jirí Krehula | Czech Republic | 2.13 | q |
| 7 | Branko Ðuricic | Yugoslavia | 2.13 | q |
| 8 | Luke Crawley | United Kingdom | 2.10 | q |
| 9 | Dane Richter | Australia | 2.10 | |
| 10 | Mihaíl Tomarás | Greece | 2.05 | |
| | Damon Thompson | Barbados | NH | |
| | Péter Komendant | Hungary | NH | |

==== Group B ====
| Rank | Name | Nationality | Result | Notes |
|---|---|---|---|---|
| 1 | Jacques Freitag | South Africa | 2.13 | q |
| 2 | Alfred Neale | United States | 2.13 | q |
| 3 | Tomasz Smialek | Poland | 2.13 | q |
| 4 | Yohaav Shuster | Israel | 2.10 | q |
| 5 | Cui Kai | China | 2.10 | |
| 5 | Yeóryios Bohtsos | Greece | 2.10 | |
| 7 | Peter Horák | Slovakia | 2.10 | |
| 8 | Andreas Pohle | Germany | 2.05 | |
| 8 | Román Fehér | Hungary | 2.05 | |
| 10 | Chuka Enih-Snell | United Kingdom | 2.00 | |
| | Lee Tae-Yun | South Korea | NH | |

== Participation ==
According to an unofficial count, 23 athletes from 19 countries participated in the event.

- Australia (1)
- Barbados (1)
- Belarus (1)
- Brazil (1)
- China (1)
- Czech Republic (1)
- France (1)
- Germany (1)
- Greece (2)
- Hungary (2)
- Israel (1)
- Jamaica (1)
- Poland (1)
- Slovakia (1)
- South Africa (1)
- South Korea (1)
- United Kingdom (2)
- United States (2)
- Yugoslavia (1)
