= Dusty Jonas =

American high jumper (born 1986)

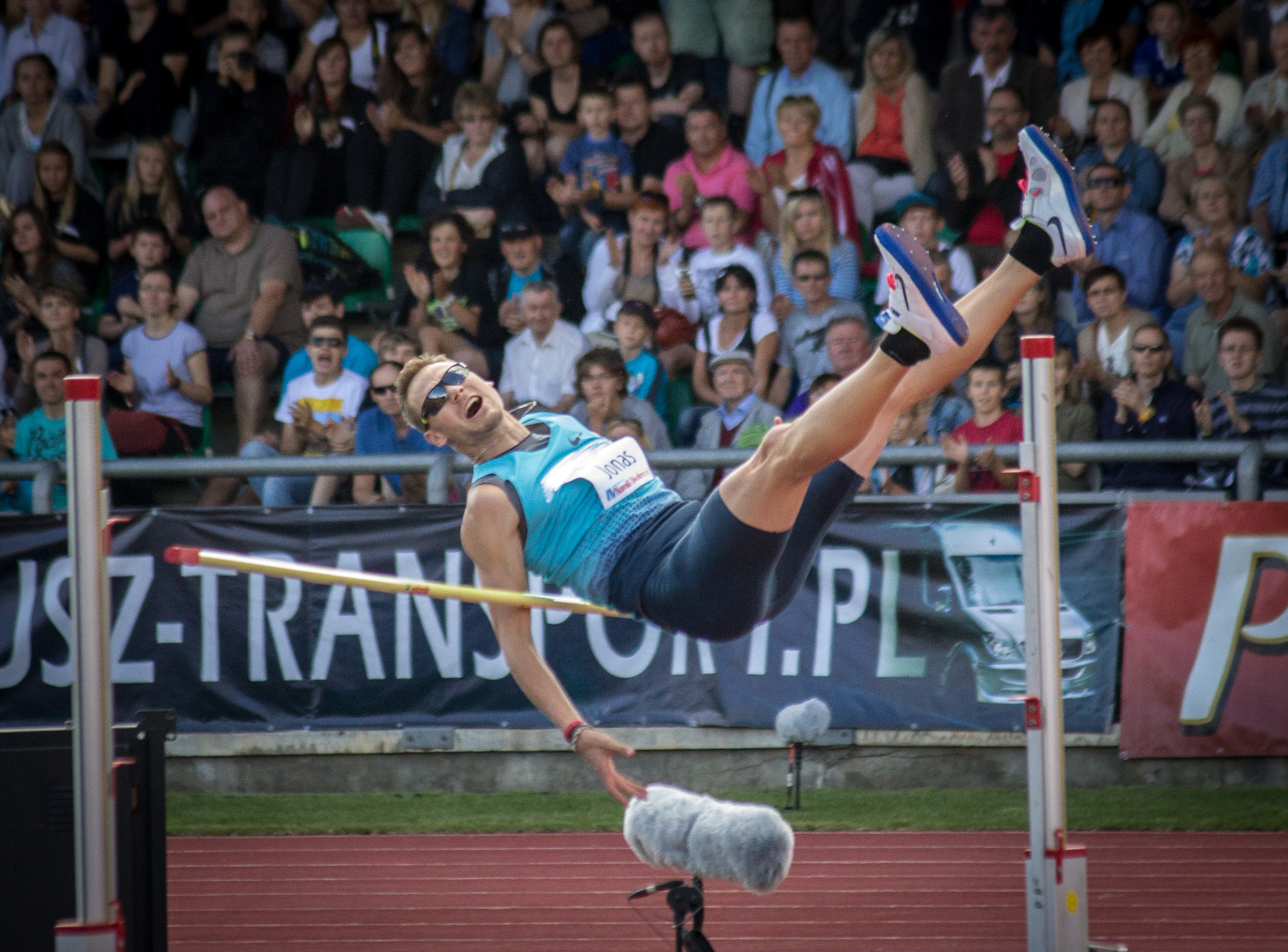
- Dusty Jonas in 2013

Medal record

Men's athletics

Representing the United States

World Indoor Championships
Bronze medal – third place	2010 Doha	High jump

Dusty Jonas (born 19 April 1986) is an American high jumper.

== Career ==
Jonas was the NCAA National Champion in the high jump at the 2008 NCAA Indoor Championships. At the 2008 Summer Olympics, Jonas finished 26th overall with a jump of 2.20.

At the 2010 IAAF World Indoor Championships, Jonas won the bronze medal in the high jump with a jump of 2.31.

== Personal bests ==
Event	Height	Location	Date
High jump (outdoor)	2.36	Boulder	18 May 2008
High jump (indoor)	2.34	Lincoln, NE	2 February 2012

Last updated February 7, 2012.
