= 2010 IAAF World Indoor Championships – Men's high jump =

The men's high jump at the 2010 IAAF World Indoor Championships was held at the ASPIRE Dome on 12 and 14 March.

== Medalists ==
Gold	Silver	Bronze
Ivan Ukhov; Russia	Yaroslav Rybakov; Russia	Dusty Jonas; United States

== Records ==
Standing records prior to the 2010 IAAF World Indoor Championships
World record	Javier Sotomayor (CUB)	2.43	Budapest, Hungary	4 March 1989
Championship record	Javier Sotomayor (CUB)	2.43	Budapest, Hungary	4 March 1989
World Leading	Ivan Ukhov (RUS)	2.38	Banská Bystrica, Slovakia	4 March 2010
African record	Anthony Idiata (NGR)	2.32	Patras, Greece	15 February 2000
Asian record	Zhu Jianhua (CHN)	2.31	Kobe, Japan	5 March 1986
European record	Carlo Thränhardt (FRG)	2.42	Berlin, Germany	26 February 1988
North and Central American and Caribbean record	Javier Sotomayor (CUB)	2.43	Budapest, Hungary	4 March 1989
Oceanian Record	Tim Forsyth (AUS)	2.33	Balingen, Germany	16 February 1997
South American record	Gilmar Mayo (COL)	2.27	Piraeus, Greece	24 February 1999

== Qualification standards ==
Indoor
2.28 m

== Schedule ==
Date	Time	Round
March 12, 2010	14:30	Qualification
March 14, 2010	17:00	Final

== Results ==
=== Qualification ===
Qualification: Qualifying Performance 2.31 (Q) or at least 8 best performers (q) advance to the final.

Rank	Athlete	Nationality	2.18	2.23	2.26	2.29	Result	Notes
1	Ivan Ukhov	Russia	xo	o	o	o	2.29	q
2	Yaroslav Rybakov	Russia	o	o	o	xo	2.29	q
3	Samson Oni	Great Britain	xo	o	o	xx	2.26	q
3	Jesse Williams	United States	xo	o	o	xx	2.26	q
5	Martin Günther	Germany	o	xxo	xo	xxx	2.26	q
6	Kabelo Kgosiemang	Botswana	o	o	xxo	xx	2.26	q
6	Kyriakos Ioannou	Cyprus	-	o	xxo	xx	2.26	q
6	Dusty Jonas	United States	o	o	xxo	xx	2.26	q
9	Tom Parsons	Great Britain	o	xo	xxo	xxx	2.26	
9	Yuriy Krymarenko	Ukraine	xo	o	xxo	xxx	2.26	SB
11	Trevor Barry	Bahamas	o	o	xxx		2.23	SB
11	Jaroslav Bába	Czech Republic	o	o	xxx		2.23	
11	Osku Torro	Finland	o	o	xxx		2.23	
14	Mutaz Essa Barshim	Qatar	o	xo	xxx		2.23	
15	Donald Thomas	Bahamas	xo	xxx			2.18	
	Zhang Shufeng	China	xx-				NM	
	Sergey Zasimovich	Kazakhstan	xxx				NM	
	Dmytro Dem'yanyuk	Ukraine	x				NM	
	Mickaël Hanany	France					DNS	

=== Final ===
Rank	Athlete	Nationality	2.20	2.24	2.28	2.31	2.33	2.35	2.36	2.41	Result	Notes
1st place, gold medalist(s)	Ivan Ukhov	Russia	o	o	x-	o	o	—	o	xx	2.36	
2nd place, silver medalist(s)	Yaroslav Rybakov	Russia	o	o	o	o	xxx				2.31	
3rd place, bronze medalist(s)	Dusty Jonas	United States	o	o	o	xo	xxx				2.31	
4	Kyriakos Ioannou	Cyprus	xxo	o	o	xxx					2.28	
5	Jesse Williams	United States	o	—	xo	xx-	x				2.28	
6	Kabelo Kgosiemang	Botswana	xo	o	xxo	xxx					2.28	NR
7	Samson Oni	Great Britain	o	o	xxx						2.24	
8	Martin Günther	Germany	xo	xxo	xxx						2.24	
