= Gisle Ellingsen =

Norwegian high jumper (born 1965)

Gisle Ellingsen (born 11 October 1965) is a former Norwegian high jumper. He represented the athletics club IL Gular.

He finished twelfth at the 1989 European Indoor Championships. He became Norwegian champion in 1987.

His personal best jump was 2.22 metres, achieved in June 1987 in Porto.
