= Athletics at the 1998 Asian Games – Men's high jump =

Event at 1998 Asian Games

Men's high jump at the 1998 Asian Games
- Venue: Thammasat Stadium
- Dates: 18 December 1998
- Competitors: 12 from 10 nations

Medalists
gold medal	Lee Jin-taek	South Korea
silver medal	Zhou Zhongge	China
bronze medal	Shigeki Toyoshima	Japan
bronze medal	Loo Kum Zee	Malaysia

The men's high jump competition at the 1998 Asian Games in Bangkok, Thailand was held on 18 December at the Thammasat Stadium.

== Schedule ==
All times are Indochina Time (UTC+07:00)

Date	Time	Event
Friday, 18 December 1998	14:00	Final

== Results ==
Legend

- NM — No mark

Rank	Athlete	Result	Notes
1st place, gold medalist(s)	Lee Jin-taek (KOR)	2.27	
2nd place, silver medalist(s)	Zhou Zhongge (CHN)	2.23	
3rd place, bronze medalist(s)	Shigeki Toyoshima (JPN)	2.19	
3rd place, bronze medalist(s)	Loo Kum Zee (MAS)	2.19	
5	Nikolaý Stolyarow (TKM)	2.15	
6	Jean-Claude Rabbath (LIB)	2.15	
7	Ali Mohamed Al-Fadaaq (QAT)	2.10	
7	Takahisa Yoshida (JPN)	2.10	
7	Fakhredin Fouad (JOR)	2.10	
10	Salem Nasser Bakheet (BRN)	2.00	
11	Thaworn Yailert (THA)	1.95	
—	Suthiwat Phongmai (THA)	NM	
