= Oskari Frösén =

Finnish high jumper (born 1976)

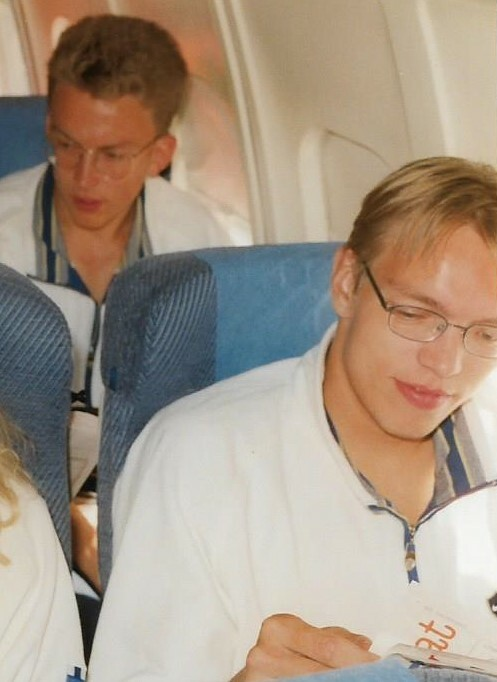
Oskari Frösén image

Oskari Frösén (born 24 January 1976 in Kristinestad) is a Finnish high jumper, who won a total of five national titles in the men's high jump event.

He won the 1995 European Athletics Junior Championships, finished ninth at the 2002 European Championships, eleventh at the 2005 World Championships, ninth at the 2006 European Championships, and eighth at the 2007 European Indoor Championships.

He also competed in the 2004 Olympics, but failed to qualify from his pool.

His personal best jump is 2.30 metres (7 ft 6.55 in), achieved in June 2001 in Kuortane. He has a better indoor mark of 2.31 metres (7 ft 6.94 in) achieved in Tallinn in February 2004.

== Achievements ==
| Year | Competition | Venue | Position | Notes |
Representing Finland
| 1992 | World Junior Championships | Seoul, South Korea | 27th (q) | 2.05 m |
| 1994 | World Junior Championships | Lisbon, Portugal | 6th | 2.15 m |
| 1997 | European U23 Championships | Turku, Finland | 10th | 2.15 m |
| 2006 | European Championships | Gothenburg, Sweden | 9th | 2.27 m |
| 2008 | Finnish Championships | Tampere, Finland | 1st | 2.27 m |
| 2009 | Finnish Championships | Espoo, Finland | 1st | 2.22 m |
