= Athletics at the 2002 Commonwealth Games – Men's high jump =

Men's high jump

Men's high jump at the Commonwealth Games

The men's high jump event at the 2002 Commonwealth Games was held on 28–29 July.

== Medalists ==
Gold	Silver	Bronze
Mark Boswell; Canada	Kwaku Boateng; Canada	Ben Challenger; England

== Results ==
=== Qualification ===
Qualification: 2.21 m (Q) or at least 12 best (q) qualified for the final.

Rank	Group	Athlete	Nationality	1.85	1.90	1.95	2.00	2.05	2.10	2.15	Result	Notes
1	A	Kwaku Boateng	Canada	–	–	–	–	–	–	o	2.15	q
1	A	Dalton Grant	England	–	–	–	–	–	–	o	2.15	q
1	A	Germaine Mason	Jamaica	–	–	–	–	–	o	o	2.15	q
1	B	Mark Boswell	Canada	–	–	–	–	–	o	o	2.15	q
1	B	Ben Challenger	England	–	–	–	–	–	o	o	2.15	q
6	B	Craig Norman	Jamaica	–	–	–	–	o	o	xo	2.15	q
7	A	Robert Mitchell	Wales	–	–	–	–	o	o	xxo	2.15	q, SB
8	A	Nick Moroney	Australia	–	–	–	–	o	xo	xxo	2.15	q
9	A	Damon Thompson	Barbados	–	–	–	–	xxo	o	xxo	2.15	q
10	B	Martin Aram	Isle of Man	–	o	–	o	o	o	xxx	2.10	q, PB
10	B	Richard Aspden	England	–	–	–	o	o	o	xxx	2.10	q
10	B	Henderson Dottin	Barbados	–	–	–	–	–	o	xxx	2.10	q
13	A	Ioannis Constantinou	Cyprus	–	–	–	o	o	xo	xxx	2.10	
14	A	Eugene Ernesta	Seychelles	–	–	–	o	xxx			2.00	
15	A	Quintin Salia-Konteh	Sierra Leone	–	–	–	xo	xxx			2.00	
16	B	Gavin Lee	Montserrat	o	o	o	xxx				1.95	
	B	Maligie Sillah	Sierra Leone	–	xxx						NM	
	B	Khemraj Naiko	Mauritius								DNS	

=== Final ===
Rank	Athlete	Nationality	2.05	2.10	2.15	2.20	2.25	2.28	2.36	Result	Notes
1st place, gold medalist(s)	Mark Boswell	Canada	–	–	–	o	–	o	xxx	2.28	
2nd place, silver medalist(s)	Kwaku Boateng	Canada	–	–	o	–	o	xxx		2.25	SB
3rd place, bronze medalist(s)	Ben Challenger	England	–	–	o	xo	xo	xxx		2.25	SB
4	Nick Moroney	Australia	o	o	o	xo	xxx			2.20	
5	Germaine Mason	Jamaica	–	o	xo	xxo	xxx			2.20	
6	Dalton Grant	England	–	–	o	–	xxx			2.15	
7	Craig Norman	Jamaica	–	xo	o	xxx				2.15	
7	Damon Thompson	Barbados	–	xo	o	xxx				2.15	
9	Henderson Dottin	Barbados	–	xo	xo	xxx				2.15	
10	Robert Mitchell	Wales	o	xo	xxo	xxx				2.15	SB
11	Richard Aspden	England	o	o	xxx					2.10	
	Martin Aram	Isle of Man	xxx							NM	
