= Rolandas Verkys =

Lithuanian high jumper (born 1966)

Rolandas Verkys (born 17 March 1966) is a Lithuanian retired high jumper. He won four national titles for Lithuania in the men's high jump event. Rolandas Verkys coach was Petras Dromantas one of the best high jump coaches in former Soviet Union. Rolandas Verkys career started in sports boarding school based in Panevėžys, Lithuania.

He finished seventh at the 1992 European Indoor Championships in Genoa with a jump of 2.26 metres.

His personal best jump was 2.34 metres, achieved in June 1991 in Warsaw. This is the current Lithuanian record. The result ranked him third among European high jumpers that season, behind Dalton Grant and Sorin Matei.
