= Ștefan Vasilache =

Romanian high jumper

Medal record

Men's athletics

World Indoor Championships
Bronze medal – third place	2004 Budapest	High jump

Ştefan Vasilache (born 9 May 1979) is a Romanian high jumper.

Vasilache finished eleventh at the 2001 Summer Universiade. At the 2004 World Indoor Championships, he jumped 2.25 metres, which was enough to secure a surprising bronze medal, alongside Jaroslav Bába and Germaine Mason who achieved the same result. Later that year he jumped the same height in the Olympic Games, but was knocked out in the qualification round there. He also competed at the 2002 European Championships and the 2003 World Championships without reaching the final round. He became national champion in 1996 and every year between 2000-2006.

His personal best jump is 2.30 metres, achieved in July 2003 in Trikala. This ranks him fourth among Romanian high jumpers, behind Sorin Matei, Eugen-Cristian Popescu and Constantin Militaru.
