= Salem Nasser Bakheet =

Bahraini high jumper

Medal record

Men's athletics

Representing Bahrain

Asian Championships
Silver medal – second place	2002 Colombo	High jump

Asian Indoor Championships
Silver medal – second place	2006 Pattaya	High jump

Salem Nasser Al shingel (born 27 June 1977) is a Bahraini athlete who specialises in the high jump. His biggest success is the silver medal at the 2002 Asian Championships.

His personal bests of 2.19 metres outdoors and 2.13 metres indoors, both set in 2006, are both current national records.

== Competition record ==
Year	Competition	Venue	Position	Notes
Representing Bahrain
1998	Asian Games	Bangkok, Thailand	10th	2.00 m
2002	Asian Championships	Colombo, Sri Lanka	2nd	2.15 m
2002	Asian Games	Busan, South Korea	5th	2.19 m
2003	Arab Championships	Amman, Jordan	2nd	2.18 m
2003	Asian Championships	Manila, Philippines	6th	2.15 m
2004	Pan Arab Games	Algiers, Algeria	3rd	2.11 m
2005	Islamic Solidarity Games	Mecca, Saudi Arabia	5th	2.14 m
2006	Asian Indoor Championships	Pattaya, Thailand	2nd	2.13 m
2006	Asian Games	Doha, Qatar	5th	2.19 m
2007	Asian Championships	Amman, Jordan	11th	2.10 m
2007	Pan Arab Games	Cairo, Egypt	8th	2.05 m
2008	Asian Indoor Championships	Doha, Qatar	8th	2.05 m
2009	Asian Indoor Games	Hanoi, Vietnam	9th	2.05 m
2010	West Asian Championships	Aleppo, Syria	9th	2.05 m
2010	Asian Games	Guangzhou, China	16th (q)	2.05 m
