= Terje Totland =

Norwegian high jumper

Terje Totland (born 14 February 1957) is a former Norwegian high jumper. He represented Eikanger IL.

At the 1976 Summer Olympics he finished ninth in the high jump final with a jump of 2.18 metres. In addition he finished tenth at the 1978 European Indoor Championships, fourteenth at the 1978 European Championships and sixteenth at the 1984 European Indoor Championships. He became Norwegian champion in 1977, 1978, 1980, 1981, 1984 and 1984.

His personal best jump was 2.22 metres, achieved in July 1977 in Hamar.
