= Emilian Kaszczyk =

Polish high jumper

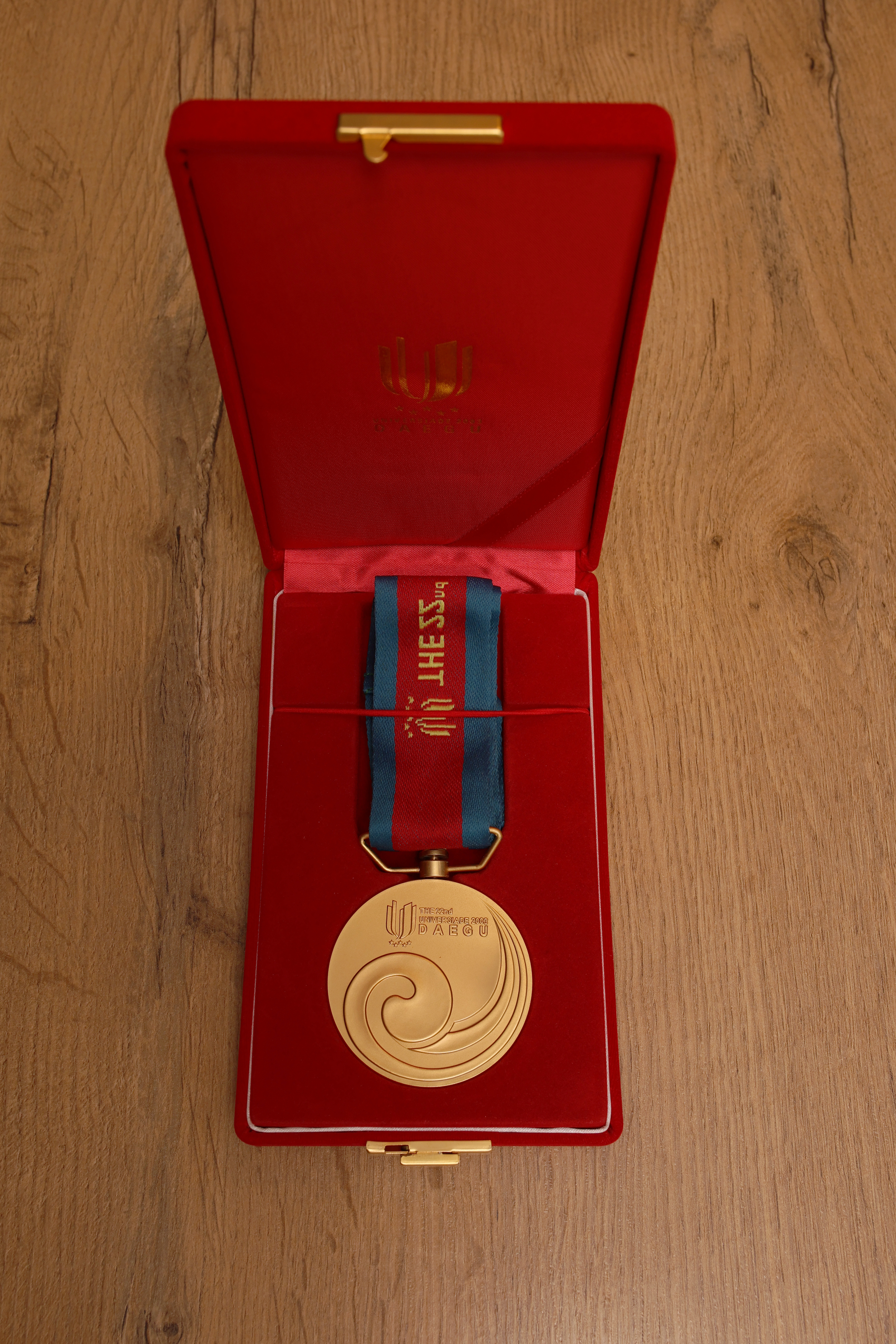
Gold won in 2003

Emilian Kaszczyk (born 21 April 1980) is a Polish retired high jumper.

He is mainly known as the gold medalist at the 2003 Summer Universiade. His personal best is 2.28 metres, achieved in July 2003 in Bielsko-Biała.
