= Fabrice Saint-Jean =

French high jumper

Fabrice Saint-Jean (born 21 November 1980) is a retired French high jumper.

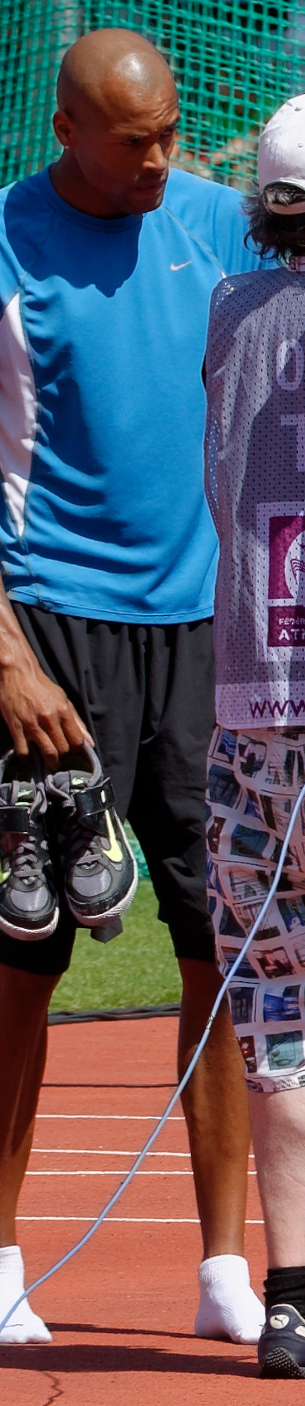
Fabrice Saint-Jean Men high jump French Athletics Championships 2013 t152250 (cropped)

He won the bronze medal at the 2001 European U23 Championships. He took additional bronze medals at the regional events 2009 Jeux de la Francophonie and the 2013 Mediterranean Games, and also a seventh place at the 2013 Jeux de la Francophonie.

Saint-Jean also competed at the 2012 European Championships without reaching the final. His personal best is 2.28 metres, achieved in June 2012 in Geneva.
