= Cui Kai =

Chinese high jumper (born 1982)

Medal record

Men's athletics

Representing China

Asian Championships
Gold medal – first place	2002 Colombo	High jump

Cui Kai (Chinese: 崔凯; born on March 26, 1982) is a retired Chinese track and field athlete who specialised in the high jump. He won silver medal at the inaugural World Youth Championships in 1999.

He has personal bests of 2.25 metres outdoors (2003) and 2.15 metres indoors (2004).

== Competition record ==
Year	Competition	Venue	Position	Notes
Representing China
1999	World Youth Championships	Bydgoszcz, Poland	2nd	2.13 m
1999	Asian Junior Championships	Singapore	2nd	2.15 m
2000	World Junior Championships	Santiago, Chile	13th (q)	2.10 m
2002	Asian Championships	Colombo, Sri Lanka	1st	2.19 m
2002	Asian Games	Busan, South Korea	2nd	2.19 m
2003	Universiade	Daegu, South Korea	3rd	2.20 m
2003	Asian Championships	Manila, Philippines	5th	2.19 m
2003	Afro-Asian Games	Hyderabad, India	1st	2.18 m
