= Athletics at the 2003 Pan American Games – Men's high jump =

Men's high jump at the Pan American Games

The final of the Men's High Jump event at the 2003 Pan American Games took place on Saturday August 9, 2003. Jamaica's winner Germaine Mason set a new national record, with a leap of 2.34 metres.

== Medalists ==
Gold	Germaine Mason; Jamaica
Silver	Jamie Nieto; United States
Bronze	Terrance Woods; United States

== Records ==
World Record	Javier Sotomayor (CUB)	2.45 m	July 27, 1993	Salamanca, Spain
Pan Am Record	Javier Sotomayor (CUB)	2.40 m	March 25, 1995	Mar del Plata, Argentina

== Results ==
Rank	Athlete	Jumps						Final
Rank	Athlete	1	2	3	4	5	6	Result
1	Germaine Mason (JAM)	2.16-O	2.20-XO	2.24-O	2.28-O	2.32-XO	2.34-XO	2.34 m
2	Jamie Nieto (USA)	2.16-O	2.20-O	2.24-O	2.28-XXO	2.32-XXX		2.28 m
3	Terrance Woods (USA)	2.18-XO	2.22-O	2.26-XXX				2.22 m
4	Lisvany Pérez (CUB)	2.16-O	2.20-O	2.24-XXX				2.20 m
5	Fabrício Romero (BRA)	2.16-O	2.20-XO	2.24-XXX				2.20 m
6	Jessé de Lima (BRA)	2.10-O	2.16-O	2.20-XXX				2.16 m
7	Henderson Dottin (BAR)	2.10-O	2.13-O	2.16-XO	2.20-XXX			2.16 m
8	Huguens Jean (HAI)	2.10-XO	2.13-O	2.16-XO	2.20-XXX			2.16 m
9	Romel Lightbourne (BAH)	2.00-O	2.10-XO	2.13-XO	2.16-XO	2.18-XXX		2.16 m
10	Alfredo Deza (PER)	2.13-XO	2.18-XXX					2.13 m
11	James Rolle (BAH)	2.00-O	2.05-O	2.10-XXO	2.13-X			2.10 m

== See also ==
- 2003 World Championships in Athletics – Men's high jump
- 2003 High Jump Year Ranking
- Athletics at the 2004 Summer Olympics – Men's high jump
