= Athletics at the 2003 Summer Universiade – Men's high jump =

The men's high jump event at the 2003 Summer Universiade was held on 26–28 August in Daegu, South Korea.

== Medalists ==
Gold	Silver	Bronze
Emilian Kaszczyk; Poland	Joan Charmant; France	Cui Kai; China; Yiannos Constantinou; Cyprus; Aliaksandr Viarutsin; Belarus

== Results ==
=== Qualification ===
Rank	Group	Athlete	Nationality	1.80	1.90	2.00	2.10	2.15	Result	Notes
1	A	Joan Charmant	France						2.15	Q
1	A	Cui Kai	China						2.15	Q
1	A	Aliaksandr Viarutsin	Belarus						2.15	Q
1	A	Andrey Tereshin	Russia						2.15	Q
1	A	Bae Kyoung-ho	South Korea						2.15	Q
6	A	Yiannos Constantinou	Cyprus						2.15	Q
7	A	Emilian Kaszczyk	Poland						2.15	Q
8	A	Jesse Lipscombe	Canada						2.15	Q
9	A	Dawid Jaworski	Poland						2.15	Q
1	B	Wang Zhouzhou	China						2.15	Q
10	A	Henderson Dottin	Barbados			–	o	xxx	2.10	q
2	B	Derek Watkins	Canada						2.10	q
2	B	Artsiom Zaitsau	Belarus						2.10	q
	?	Mihail Tomaras	Greece						2.10	
	?	Ahmad Najwan Aqra	Malaysia						2.00	
	?	Ali Gujar Tariq	Pakistan						1.90	
	?	Abdullah Taher Hassan	United Arab Emirates						1.90	
	?	Iran Ngoc Dung	Vietnam						1.80	

=== Final ===
Rank	Athlete	Nationality	2.10	2.20	2.23	2.26	2.30	Result	Notes
1st place, gold medalist(s)	Emilian Kaszczyk	Poland	xo	xxo	xxo	xxo	xxx	2.26	
2nd place, silver medalist(s)	Joan Charmant	France	o	o	xo	xxx		2.23	
3rd place, bronze medalist(s)	Cui Kai	China	o	o	xxx			2.20	
3rd place, bronze medalist(s)	Yiannos Constantinou	Cyprus	o	o	xxx			2.20	
3rd place, bronze medalist(s)	Aliaksandr Viarutsin	Belarus	o	o	xxx			2.20	
6	Henderson Dottin	Barbados	o	xo	xxx			2.20	
6	Dawid Jaworski	Poland	o	xo	xxx			2.20	
6	Andrey Tereshin	Russia	o	xo	xxx			2.20	
6	Wang Zhouzhou	China	o	xo	xxx			2.20	
10	Bae Kyoung-ho	South Korea	o	xxo	xxx			2.20	
11	Jesse Lipscombe	Canada	o	xxx				2.10	
12	Derek Watkins	Canada	xo	xxx				2.10	
	Artsiom Zaitsau	Belarus	xxx					NM	
