= 2003 Asian Athletics Championships – Men's high jump =

The men's high jump event at the 2003 Asian Athletics Championships was held in Manila, Philippines on September 23.

== Results ==
Rank	Name	Nationality	Result	Notes
1st place, gold medalist(s)	Wang Zhouzhou	China	2.23	
2nd place, silver medalist(s)	Bae Kyoung-Ho	South Korea	2.19	
3rd place, bronze medalist(s)	Naoyuki Daigo	Japan	2.19	SB
3rd place, bronze medalist(s)	Loo Kum Zee	Malaysia	2.19	SB
5	Cui Kai	China	2.19	
6	Salem Nasser Bakheet	Bahrain	2.15	
6	Jean-Claude Rabbath	Lebanon	2.15	
8	Takahiro Uchida	Japan	2.15	=SB
9	Chen Hung-Chieh	Chinese Taipei	2.10	SB
10	Sean Guevara	Philippines	2.10	
11	Manjula Kumara Wijesekara	Sri Lanka	2.10	
12	Nalin Priyadharshani	Sri Lanka	2.10	
