= Sven Ootjers =

Dutch high jumper and hurdler, and later, track coach

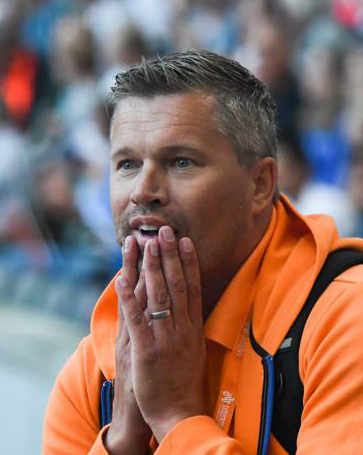
- Ootjers in 2018

Personal information
- Nationality: Dutch
- Born: 24 June 1973 (age 53)

Sport
- Country: The Netherlands
- Sport: Track and field
- Events: High jump, 110 metres hurdles, Decathlon
- Club: AV Trias & AV NOVA
- Now coaching: Lisanne de Witte

Achievements and titles
- Personal bests: 110 metres hurdles: 13.81 s High jump: 2.21 m Decathlon: 7301 pts

Sven Ootjers (born 24 June 1973) is a Dutch track and field coach and former athlete. As an athlete he competed at high jump, 110 metres hurdles and the decathlon. He is a seven time national champion. He represented his country at the 1992 World Junior Championships in Athletics and the 1997 Summer Universiade.

He is a trainer for the elite athletes who train at AV Trias. Among the athletes he has trained are Laura de Witte, Lisanne de Witte, Owen Westerhout and Jamile Samuel.

== International competitions ==
| Year | Competition | Venue | Position | Event | Notes |
|---|---|---|---|---|---|
| 1992 | World Junior Championships | Seoul, South Korea | 10th | High jump | 2.14 m |
| 1997 | Universiade | Catania, Italy | 7th | 110 m hurdles | 13.93 |

== National titles ==
- Dutch Indoor Athletics Championships
  - High jump: 1992, 1993, 1994
  - Heptathlon: 2001, 2004
- Dutch Athletics Championships
  - High jump: 1992, 1994

== See also ==
- List of high jump national champions (men)
