= Antoine Burke =

Irish high jumper (b/1975)

Personal information
- Nationality: Irish
- Born: July 20, 1975 (age 51) Limerick, Ireland

Sport
- Sport: Athletics
- Event: High jump

Antoine Burke (born 20 July 1975) is an Irish retired high jumper.

== Biography ==
Born in Limerick, Burke attended University College Dublin on an athletics scholarship and also studied at the University of Limerick. He had an eclectic athletic career representing Ireland as a senior athlete at the high jump, long jump, 400 metres and 400 metre hurdles.

He was runner up at the 1994 World Junior Championship in the high jump and four years later jumped a personal best of 2.24 metres. Burke competed for some years both in the high jump and other events. Whilst some observers of Irish athletics mused that 6 ft 4 tall Burke who was in and around fourteen stone could have fond his ultimate forte as a decathlete, his success in this field would have been uncertain and it was a path he chose not to pursue.

As a high jumper he also finished nineteenth at the 1992 World Junior Championships, and thirteenth at the 1998 European Indoor Championships. He was a member of the Irish 4 × 400 m Relay team who were 5th place finalists at the 2002 European Championships. He also finished third behind Brendan Reilly and Geoff Parsons at the British 1994 AAA Championships.

In the late 1990s he moved to Liverpool to train with renowned UK high jump coach Mike Holmes. The training group was a who's who of UK high jump talent. Antoine joined such stars as Olympic bronze medalist Steve Smith, Irish record holder Brendan Riley and multi-title holder Danny Graham.

== Achievements ==
Year	Competition	Venue	Position	Event	Notes
Representing Ireland
1992	World Junior Championships	Seoul, South Korea	19th	High jump	2.00 m
1994	World Junior Championships	Lisbon, Portugal	2nd	High jump	2.20 m
1997	European U23 Championships	Turku, Finland	10th	High jump	2.15 m
1998	European Indoor Championships	Valencia, Spain	13th	High jump	2.22 m
