= Bi Hongyong =

Chinese high jumper

Bi Hongyong (born 16 November 1974) is a retired Chinese high jumper. He finished twelfth at the 1995 World Championships, clearing only 2.15 metres (7 ft 1 in) after jumping 2.27 m (7 ft 5 in) in the qualification round. He won the Asian Junior Championships in 1992. He is a two-time national champion for PR China in the men's high jump event.

== Achievements ==
Year	Tournament	Venue	Result	Height
1995	World Championships	Gothenburg, Sweden	12th	2.15 m
