= Mustapha Raifak =

French high jumper

Personal information
- Born: 9 September 1975 (age 51) Montreuil, France

Sport
- Sport: Track and field

Mustapha Raifak (born 9 September 1975) is a French high jumper.

Raifak was a four-time All-American for the SMU Mustangs track and field team, finishing 5th in the high jump at the 2000 NCAA Division I Indoor Track and Field Championships.

He finished seventh at the 2006 World Cup. He also competed at the 1997 World Championships and the 2006 World Indoor Championships without reaching the final round.

His personal best jump is 2.28 metres, achieved in July 1997 in Toulouse.

== Competition record ==
| Year | Competition | Venue | Position | Notes |
Representing France
| 1993 | European Junior Championships | San Sebastián, Spain | 14th (q) | 2.09 m |
| 1997 | European U23 Championships | Turku, Finland | 5th | 2.21 m |
| 1997 | World Championships | Athens, Greece | 20th (q) | 2.23 m |
| 1997 | Universiade | Catania, Italy | 16th (q) | 2.10 m |
| 1998 | European Indoor Championships | Valencia, Spain | 20th (q) | 2.10 m |
| 2001 | Jeux de la Francophonie | Ottawa, Canada | 4th | 2.21 m |
| 2001 | Mediterranean Games | Radès, Tunisia | 11th | 2.10 m |
| 2005 | Jeux de la Francophonie | Niamey, Niger | 1st | 2.24 m |
| 2006 | World Indoor Championships | Moscow, Russia | 13th (q) | 2.24 m |
| 2006 | World Cup | Athens, Greece | 7th | 2.10 m |
