= Wolfgang Kreißig =

German high jumper

Personal information
- Born: 29 August 1970 (age 56) Gehrden, West Germany

Sport
- Sport: Track and field
Medal record
Representing Germany
Summer Universiade
Silver medal – second place	1995 Fukuoka	High jump

Wolfgang Kreißig (born 29 August 1970) is a retired German track and field athlete who specialised in the high jump. He was a finalist at both 1996 and 2000 Summer Olympics, finishing ninth and eighth respectively. His best placing on the global stage was fifth at the 1997 IAAF World Indoor Championships.

Kreissig competed for the Georgia Bulldogs track and field team in the NCAA.

He has personal bests of 2.34 metres outdoors (1999) and 2.30 metres indoors (1997). He was a member of the MTG Mannheim sports club.

== Competition record ==
Year	Competition	Venue	Position	Notes
Representing West Germany
1989	European Junior Championships	Varaždin, Yugoslavia	3rd	2.20 m
Representing Germany
1994	European Championships	Helsinki, Finland	13th	2.20 m
1994	World Cup	London, United Kingdom	5th	2.20 m
1995	World Championships	Gothenburg, Sweden	17th (q)	2.24 m
1995	Universiade	Fukuoka, Japan	2nd	2.29 m
1996	Olympic Games	Atlanta, United States	9th	2.29 m
1997	World Indoor Championships	Paris, France	5th	2.29 m
1999	World Championships	Seville, Spain	14th (q)	2.26 m
2000	European Indoor Championships	Ghent, Belgium	11th (q)	2.21 m
2000	Olympic Games	Sydney, Australia	8th	2.29 m
