= Javier Bermejo =

Spanish high jumper (born 1978)

Javier Bermejo Merino (born 23 December 1978 in Puertollano) is a Spanish athlete specializing in the high jump. He competed at the 2004 and 2008 Summer Olympics without qualifying for the final.

His personal best jump is 2.28 metres, achieved in 2004. He matched this height twice in 2009, at competitions in Madrid and Castellón. His career highlights include a gold medal at the 2006 lbero-American Championships and a 9th-place overall finish at the 2005 European Indoor Championships.

== Competition record ==
Year	Competition	Venue	Position	Notes
Representing Spain
1997	European Junior Championships	Ljubljana, Slovenia	14th (q)	2.12 m
1998	Ibero-American Championships	Lisbon, Portugal	2nd	2.20 m
1999	European U23 Championships	Gothenburg, Sweden	3rd	2.22 m
2002	Ibero-American Championships	Guatemala City, Guatemala	3rd	2.23 m
2004	Ibero-American Championships	Huelva, Spain	4th	2.18 m
2004	Olympic Games	Athens, Greece	31st (q)	2.15 m
2005	European Indoor Championships	Madrid, Spain	9th (q)	2.27 m
2005	Mediterranean Games	Almería, Spain	5th	2.18 m
2006	European Championships	Gothenburg, Sweden	22nd (q)	2.15 m
2007	World Championships	Osaka, Japan	36th (q)	2.14 m
2008	World Indoor Championships	Valencia, Spain	13th (q)	2.20 m
2008	Olympic Games	Beijing, China	29th (q)	2.20 m
2009	European Indoor Championships	Turin, Italy	18th (q)	2.22 m
2009	Mediterranean Games	Pescara, Italy	6th	2.21 m
2009	World Championships	Berlin, Germany	22nd (q)	2.20 m
2010	European Championships	Barcelona, Spain	24th (q)	2.15 m
2010	Ibero-American Championships	San Fernando, Spain	1st	2.24 m
2012	Ibero-American Championships	Barquisimeto, Venezuela	5th	2.19 m
