= Samson Oni =

Nigerian-English high jumper (born 1981)

Personal information
- Nationality: British/Nigerian
- Born: 25 June 1981 (age 44)

Sport
- Sport: Athletics
- Event: high jump

Samson Oni (born 25 June 1981) is a British/Nigerian former high jumper.

== Biography ==
Early in his career Oni won the 2001 AAA Indoor Championships while representing Nigeria. He also competed in the 2007 European Indoor Championships, the 2008 World Indoor Championships, and the 2009 European Indoor Championships without reaching the final. He then finished seventh at the 2010 World Indoor Championships.

His personal best jump is 2.30 meters, achieved in June 2008 in Birmingham, England. He has 2.31 meters on the indoor track, achieved in March 2010 in Banská Bystrica. However, he achieved a personal best of 2.37 meters in practice before the Olympics.

Oni was on the podium four times at national level, at the AAA Championships in 2004 and 2005 and at the British Athletics Championships in 2009 and 2012.
