= Alessandro Talotti =

Italian high jumper (1980–2021)

Personal information
- Nationality: Italian
- Born: 7 October 1980 Udine, Italy
- Died: 16 May 2021 (aged 40) Udine, Italy
- Height: 1.93 m (6 ft 4 in)
- Weight: 79 kg (174 lb)

Sport
- Country: Italy
- Sport: Athletics
- Event: High jump
- Club: C.S. Carabinieri

Achievements and titles
- Personal best: High jump: 2.30 m (2003)

Alessandro Talotti (7 October 1980 – 16 May 2021) was an Italian high jumper.

== Biography ==
Talotti finished fourth at the 2002 European Championships in Athletics and twelfth at the 2004 Olympic Games. He also competed at the 2003 World Championships, the 2005 European Indoor Championships, and the 2008 Olympic Games without reaching the final. Talotti was the Italian high jump champion in 2000 and 2004, out jumping Giulio Ciotti, Nicola Ciotti, and Andrea Bettinelli in those campaigns.

His personal best jump was 2.30 metres, achieved in June 2003 in Florence, and which he thrice equalled thereafter. In January 2005 Talotti jumped 2.32 metres on the indoor track in Glasgow.

Talotti died of stomach cancer on 16 May 2021, at the age of 40.

== Achievements ==
Year	Competition	Venue	Position	Event	Notes
Representing Italy
2001	European U23 Championships	Amsterdam, Netherlands	10th	High jump	2.12 m
2002	European Championships	Munich, Germany	4th	High jump	2.27 m
2004	Olympic Games	Athens, Greece	10th	High jump	2.20 m

== See also ==
- Italian all-time top lists - High jump
