= Lisvany Pérez =

Cuban athletics competitor (born 1982)

Personal information
- Born: 24 January 1982 (age 44)

Sport
- Sport: Track and field

Lisvany Arlys Pérez Rodríguez (born 24 January 1982) is a Cuban-born athlete competing in the high jump and triple jump. He now represents Spain.

His personal best jump in high jump is 2.29 metres, achieved in March 2005 in Havana. His personal best in triple jump is 16.82 metres, achieved in August 2011 in Málaga.

== Competition record ==
Year	Competition	Venue	Position	Event	Notes
Representing Cuba
2001	Pan American Junior Championships	Santa Fe, Argentina	1st	High jump	2.18 m
2003	Central American and Caribbean Championships	St George's, Grenada	1st	High jump	2.21 m
2003	Pan American Games	Santo Domingo, Dominican Republic	4th	High jump	2.20 m
2004	Ibero-American Championships	Huelva, Spain	1st	High jump	2.24 m
2004	Olympic Games	Athens, Greece	11th	High jump	2.25 m
2005	Central American and Caribbean Championships	Nassau, Bahamas	2nd	High jump	2.26 m
Representing Spain
2012	European Championships	Helsinki, Finland	16th (q)	Triple jump	16.24 m
