= Michiya Onoue =

Japanese high jumper

Personal information
- Nationality: Japanese
- Born: 28 October 1971 (age 54) Shizuoka Prefecture, Japan
- Education: Nihon University

Sport
- Country: Japan
- Sport: Track and field
- Event: High jump

Achievements and titles
- Personal best: 2.28 m (1997)

Michiya Onoue (尾上 三知也, Onoue Michiya; born 28 October 1971 in Shizuoka Prefecture) is a Japanese retired high jumper. He competed at the 1997 World Championships without reaching the final. He was also the 1995 Japanese national champion.

== Personal best ==
Event	Height	Competition	Venue	Date	Notes
High jump	2.28 m	Mito International Meet	Mito, Japan	5 May 1997	

== International competition ==
Year	Competition	Venue	Position	Event	Height
Representing Japan
1995	Universiade	Fukuoka, Japan	5th	High jump	2.27 m
1997	World Championships	Athens, Greece	34th (q)	High jump	2.15 m

== National title ==
- Japanese Championships
  - High jump: 1995
