= Nick Moroney =

Australian high jumper

Nick Moroney (born 3 August 1972) is an Australian high jumper.

He finished sixth at the 1998 World Cup, competed without clearing any height at the 2002 World Cup, finished fourth at the 2002 Commonwealth Games and fifth at the 2006 Commonwealth Games. He won the 2000, 2001, 2001, 2004, 2005, 2006 and 2012 Australian Championships.

His personal best is 2.25 metres, first achieved in January 2000 in Hobart, and later equalled several times.
