= Ivan Bernasconi =

Italian high jumper

Personal information
- Nationality: Italian
- Born: October 19, 1974 (age 51) Como, Italy

Sport
- Country: Italy
- Sport: Athletics
- Event: High jump

Achievements and titles
- Personal best: High jump: 2.28 m (1999)
Medal record
Military World Games
Gold medal – first place	1999 Zagreb	High jump

Ivan Bernasconi (born 19 October 1974 in Como) is an Italian high jumper.

He won gold medal in 1999 at the 2nd editions of the Military World Games.

== Biography ==
Ivan Bernasconi participated at one edition of the European Athletics Indoor Championships (2000), he has 7 caps in national team from 1997 to 2003.

== National titles ==
He has won 3 times the individual national championship.

- 1 win in the high jump (2000)
- 2 wins in the high jump indoor (1998, 1999)

== See also ==
- High jump winners of Italian Athletics Championships
