= Zhang Shufeng =

Chinese high jumper

Medal record

Men's athletics

Representing China

Asian Championships
Bronze medal – third place	2005 Incheon	High jump

Zhang Shufeng (Chinese: 张树峰; born 24 November 1984) is a Chinese high jumper. His personal best jump is 2.30 m (7 ft 6 1/2 in), achieved in August 2006 in Shijiazhuang. He is from Heilongjiang province. He was a two-time winner at the National Games of China and a one-time winner of the Chinese national championships.

He won the bronze medal at the 2005 Asian Championships and the 2005 East Asian Games. At the 2007 Summer Universiade and 2010 World Indoor Championships he failed to record a valid jump.

He was coached by former Asian Games champion Zhou Zhongge. Zhou developed Zhang from a 2.20 m jumper to a 2.30 m jumper, making him international class. The two focused on improving Zhang's explosive jump capacity and lowering his centre of gravity at take-off.

== National titles ==
- National Games of China
  - High jump: 2005, 2009
- Chinese Athletics Championships
  - High jump: 2005

== International competitions ==
Year	Competition	Venue	Position	Event	Notes
2005	Asian Championships	Incheon, South Korea	3rd	High jump	2.23 m
2005	East Asian Games	Macau, China	3rd	High jump	2.20 m
2007	Universiade	Bangkok, Thailand	—	High jump	NM
2010	World Indoor Championships	Doha, Qatar	—	High jump	NM
