= Bai Yong =

Chinese senior executive and economist

- 白勇

General Manager of COFCO Group
- Incumbent
- Assumed office 22 October 2024
- Chairman: Lü Jun
- Preceded by: Luan Richeng

Personal details
- Born: October 1971 (age 54) Yidu County, Hubei, China
- Party: Chinese Communist Party
- Education: Zhongnan University of Economics and Law; Tsinghua University

Bai Yong (Chinese: 白勇; pinyin: Bái Yǒng; born October 1971) is a Chinese senior executive and economist, currently serving as general manager of COFCO Group.

== Early life and education ==
Bai was born in Yidu County, Hubei, in October 1971. He graduated from Zhongnan University of Economics and Law, where he majored in economics. He earned his EMBA degree from Tsinghua University.

== Career ==
Bai joined the Chinese Communist Party (CCP) in June 1996. Bai worked in Three Gorges Branch of China Construction Bank for a long time, and moved to China Three Gorges Corporation in 2007.

In 2018, Bai became chief accountant of China Dongfang Electric Group Co., Ltd., a position he held until 2021, when he was appointed deputy general manager and chief accountant of China National Machinery Industry Corporation.

In 2023, Bai was made deputy party secretary of China Resources (Holdings) Co., Ltd., but having held the position for only a year.

On 22 October 2024, Bai was named general manager of COFCO Group, replacing Luan Richeng.

Business positions
Preceded by Luan Richeng	General Manager of COFCO Group; 2024–present	Incumbent
