= Grégory Gabella =

French high jumper

Personal information
- Born: 22 June 1980 (age 46)
Medal record
Men's Athletics
Representing France
Mediterranean Games
Bronze medal – third place	2005 Almería	High Jump

Grégory Gabella (born 22 June 1980 in Thonon-les-Bains) is a French high jumper.

He won the silver medal at the 1999 European Junior Championships, finished fifth at the 2001 European U23 Championships, won a joint bronze medal at the 2001 Mediterranean Games, finished ninth at the 2002 European Championships and won the bronze medal at the 2005 Mediterranean Games. He also competed at the 1998 World Junior Championships without reaching the final.

Gabella became French champion in 2004 and 2005 and French indoor champion in 2002 and 2003. His personal best was 2.30 metres, achieved in June 2002 in Annecy.
