= Jamie Nieto =

American high jumper

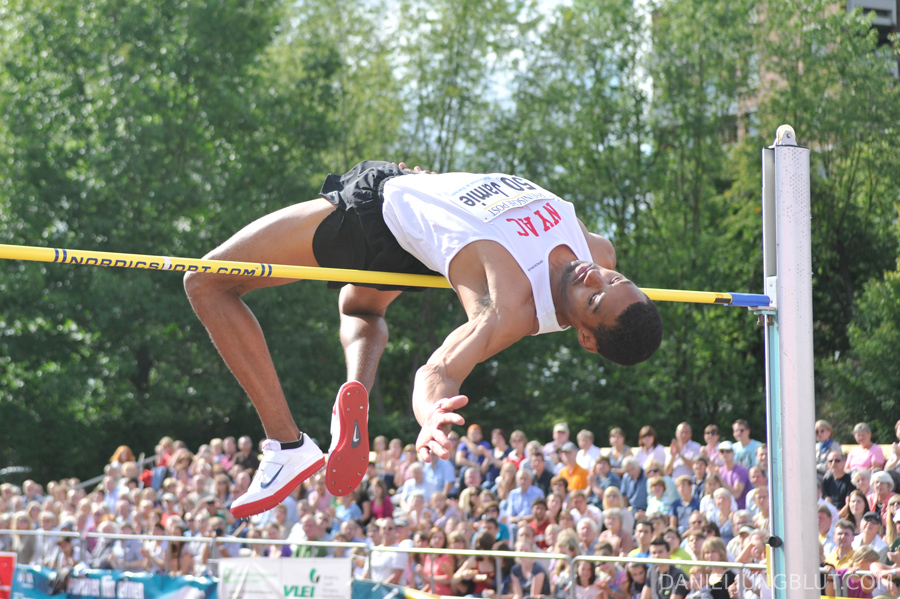
- High Jumping by Jamie Nieto.

Personal information
- Full name: Jamie Earl Nieto
- Nationality: American
- Born: November 2, 1976 (age 50) Seattle, Washington
- Occupations: Athlete, Actor, Writer
- Years active: 1993-2013
- Height: 6 ft 4 in (193 cm)
- Weight: 185 lb (84 kg)

Sport
- Sport: Track and Field
- Event: High jump

Achievements and titles
- Personal best: High Jump: 2.34 (Athens 2004)
Medal record
Men's athletics
Representing the United States
Pan American Games
Silver medal – second place	2003 Santo Domingo	High Jump

Jamie Earl "James" Nieto (born November 2, 1976) is an American high jumper and actor.

His personal best jump is 2.34 metres (92 in), achieved at the 2004 Olympic Games in Athens. He was the 2004 and 2012 USA Olympic Trials Champion as well as the 2003 USA Outdoor Champion with a jump of 2.30 metres (91 in).

Nieto attended Eastern Michigan University, Sacramento City College, and Valley High School.

Nieto suffered a serious injury resulting in paralysis while doing a back flip in April 2016. In 2017, Nieto married Olympic hurdler Shevon Nieto, and in 2020, she sang an original song dedicated to Nieto on America's Got Talent.

Nieto played baseball hall of famer Roberto Clemente in a movie named Baseball's Last Hero: 21 Clemente Stories.

== Achievements ==
Year	Tournament	Venue	Result	Extra
2003	Pan American Games	Santo Domingo, Dominican Republic	2nd	
2003	World Championships	Paris, France	7th	
2003	World Athletics Final	Monte Carlo, Monaco	3rd	
2004	World Indoor Championships	Budapest, Hungary	9th	
2004	Olympic Games	Athens, Greece	4th	2.34 m PB
2004	World Athletics Final	Monte Carlo, Monaco	4th	
2007	Pan American Games	Rio de Janeiro, Brazil	7th	
2011	Pan American Games	Guadalajara, Mexico	6th	
2012	Olympic Games	London, England	5th	
