= Martin Günther (athlete) =

German high jumper

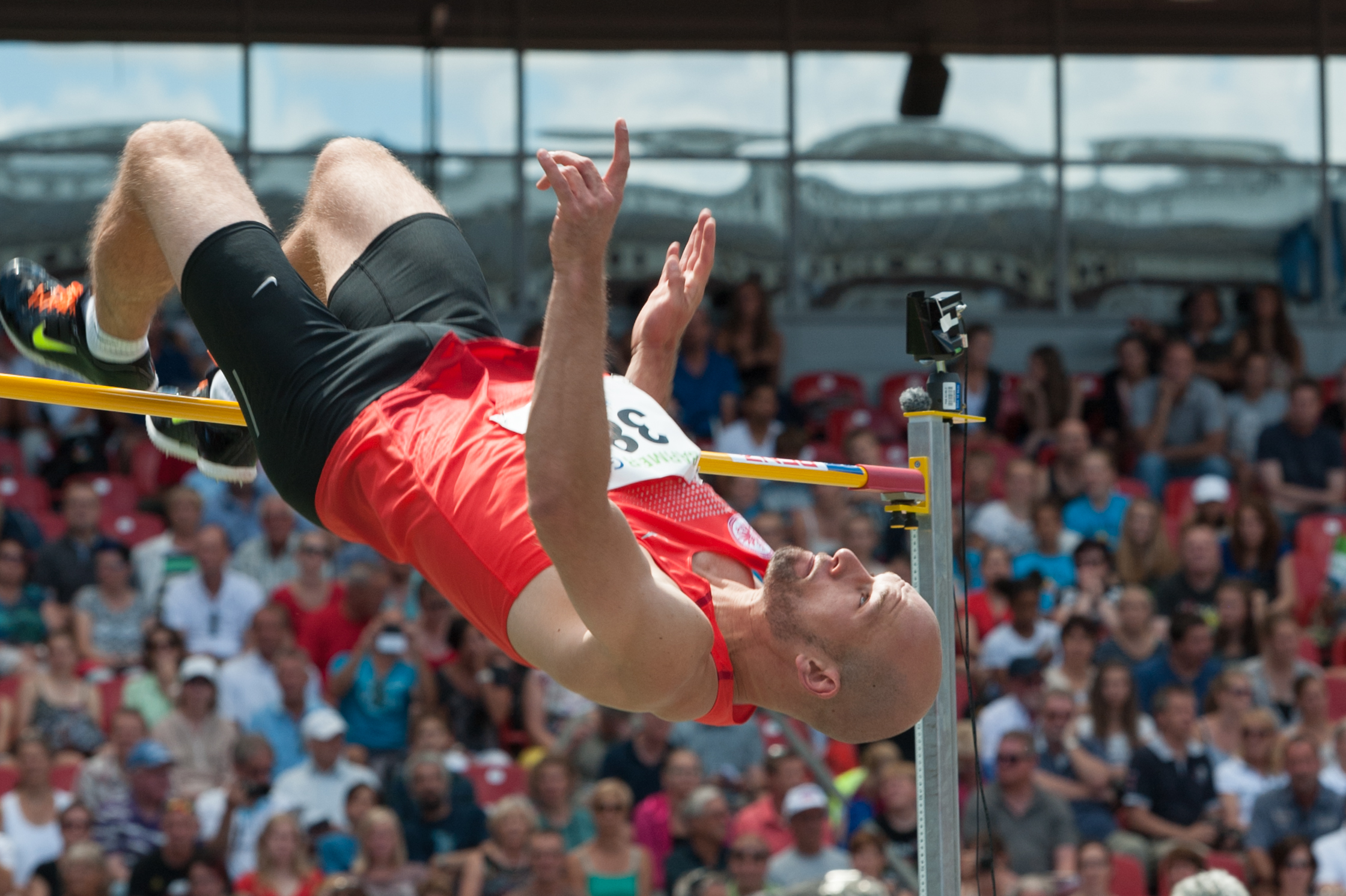
Martin Günther

Martin Günther (born 8 October 1986) is a German high jumper.

He won the 2003 World Youth Championships and finished eighth at the 2010 World Indoor Championships.

His personal best jump is 2.30 metres, achieved in February 2010 (indoor) in Karlsruhe.
