= Constantin Militaru =

Romanian high jumper

Personal information
- Born: 17 February 1963 (age 63)

Sport
- Sport: Track and field

Constantin Militaru (born 17 February 1963) is a Romanian retired high jumper.

He competed at the 1983 World Championships without reaching the final round. He became national champion in 1985 and 1992.

His personal best jump was 2.31 metres, achieved in May 1986 in Bucharest. This ranks him third among Romanian high jumpers, only behind Sorin Matei and Eugen-Cristian Popescu.
