= Loo Kum Zee =

Malaysian high jumper

Medal record

Men's athletics

Representing Malaysia

Asian Championships
Bronze medal – third place	1995 Jakarta	High jump
Bronze medal – third place	1998 Fukuoka	High jump
Bronze medal – third place	2002 Colombo	High jump
Bronze medal – third place	2003 Manila	High jump

Loo Kum Zee (born 2 December 1974) is a Malaysian high jumper. His personal best jump is 2.24 metres, achieved in December 1995 in Chiangmai.

He won bronze medals at the Asian Championships in 1995, 1998, 2002 and 2003. He also competed at the 1996 Olympic Games, but did not reach the final.

He attended secondary school in SMJK Sam Tet, Ipoh, Perak.

== Competition record ==
Year	Competition	Venue	Position	Notes
Representing Malaysia
1994	Commonwealth Games	Victoria, British Columbia, Canada	10th	2.15 m
1994	Asian Games	Hiroshima, Japan	5th	2.18 m
1995	Asian Championships	Jakarta, Indonesia	3rd	2.19 m
1996	Olympic Games	Atlanta, United States	30th (q)	2.15 m
1998	Asian Championships	Fukuoka, Japan	3rd	2.23 m
1998	Commonwealth Games	Kuala Lumpur, Malaysia	7th	2.20 m
1998	Asian Games	Bangkok, Thailand	3rd	2.19 m
2001	Southeast Asian Games	Kuala Lumpur, Malaysia	1st	2.18 m
2002	Asian Championships	Colombo, Sri Lanka	3rd	2.15 m
2002	Asian Games	Busan, South Korea	12th	2.10 m
2003	Asian Championships	Manila, Philippines	3rd	2.19 m
2003	Southeast Asian Games	Hanoi, Vietnam	1st	2.15 m

== Honour ==
=== Honour of Malaysia ===
- Malaysia :
  - Member of the Order of the Defender of the Realm (A.M.N.) (2013)
