= Alessandro Canale (high jumper) =

Italian high jumper

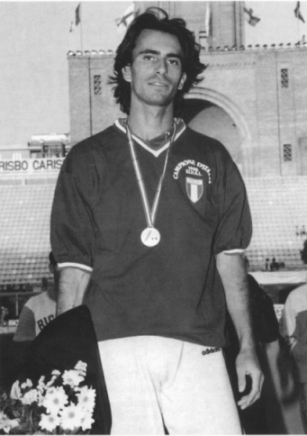

Personal information
- National team: Italy: 1 cap (1984)
- Born: 15 May 1969 (age 57) Mantua, Italy
- Height: 1.90 m (6 ft 3 in)
- Weight: 75 kg (165 lb)

Sport
- Sport: Athletics
- Event: High jump
- Club: Snam Gas Metano
- Retired: 2003

Achievements and titles
- Personal bests: High jump: 2.25 m (1994); High jump indoor: 2.22 m (1997)

Alessandro Canale (born 15 May 1969) is a former Italian champion high jumper.

Canale won three titles in a row at the national championships at the individual senior level.

== National titles ==
- Italian Athletics Indoor Championships
  - High jump: 1996, 1997
- Italian Athletics Indoor Championships
  - High jump: 1997
