= Roman Fricke =

German high jumper (born 1977)

Roman Fricke (born 23 March 1977 in Bremen) is a German high jumper.

In his early career, he won the bronze medal at the 1999 German indoor championships, representing SV Werder Bremen. Following bronze both indoors and outdoors in 2001 he won back-to-back national titles in 2003 and 2004, both indoors and outdoors, representing TSV Bayer 04 Leverkusen.

He finished thirteenth at the 2003 World Championships in Paris with a jump of 2.20 metres. He also competed in the 2004 Olympics but failed to qualify from his pool.

His personal best jump of 2.30 metres was achieved in May 2004 in Herzogenbuchsee.
