= Joan Charmant =

French high jumper

Joan Charmant (born 4 June 1978 in Bordeaux) is a retired French high jumper.

He finished fifth at the 2002 European Indoor Championships and won the silver medal at the 2003 Summer Universiade He also competed at the 2004 World Indoor Championships without reaching the final.

Charmant became French champion in 2003 and French indoor champion in 2004. His personal best was 2.24 metres, achieved in July 2003 in Narbonne. Indoors he had 2.28 metres, achieved in February 2004 in Aubière.
