= Takahisa Yoshida =

Japanese high jumper

Personal information
- Native name: 吉田 孝久
- Nationality: Japanese
- Born: February 17, 1970 (age 56)

Sport
- Country: Japan
- Sport: athletics
- Event: High jump
- Retired: Yes
Medal record
Asian Games
| Bronze medal – third place | 1990 Asian Games | High jump |
| Gold medal – first place | 1994 Asian Games | High jump |
East Asian Games
| Gold medal – first place | 1993 East Asian Games | High jump |
| Bronze medal – third place | 1997 East Asian Games | High jump |
| Silver medal – second place | 2001 East Asian Games | High jump |

Takahisa Yoshida (Japanese: 吉田 孝久; born 17 February 1970) is a Japanese former high jumper who competed in the 2000 Summer Olympics.

== Competition record ==
| Year | Competition | Venue | Position | Notes |
Representing Japan
| 1988 | World Junior Championships | Sudbury, Canada | 13th | 2.08 m |
| 1990 | Asian Games | Hiroshima, Japan | 3rd | 2.15 m |
| 1991 | World Indoor Championships | Seville, Spain | 17th (q) | 2.20 m |
| 1991 | World Championships | Tokyo, Japan | 16th (q) | 2.24 m |
| 1993 | East Asian Games | Shanghai, China | 1st | 2.26 m |
| 1993 | World Championships | Stuttgart, Germany | 14th (q) | 2.25 m |
| 1994 | Asian Games | Hiroshima, Japan | 1st | 2.27 m |
| 1997 | East Asian Games | Busan, South Korea | 3rd | 2.24 m |
| 1998 | Asian Games | Bangkok, Thailand | 7th | 2.10 m |
| 2000 | Olympic Games | Sydney, Australia | 27th (q) | 2.15 m |
| 2001 | East Asian Games | Osaka, Japan | 2nd | 2.20 m |
