= Mika Polku =

Finnish high jumper

Personal information
- Born: 19 July 1975 (age 51) Virrat, Finland

Sport
- Sport: Track and field
Medal record
Representing Finland
World Junior Championships
| Bronze medal – third place | 1994 Lisbon | High jump |

Mika Petteri Polku (born 19 July 1975) is a Finnish high jumper.

He was born in Virrat and represents the club Virtain Urheilijat. He won the bronze medal at the 1994 World Junior Championships and finished eighth at the 1996 European Indoor Championships. He competed at the 2000 Olympic Games and the 2001 World Championships without reaching the final. He became Finnish champion in 1998, 2000, 2001 and 2003, and Finnish indoor champion in 1996, 1997, 1998, 1999 and 2002.

His personal best jump is 2.31 metres, achieved in July 2000 in Vitasaari. This is a tied Finnish record.
