= Eugen-Cristian Popescu =

Romanian high jumper

Eugen-Cristian Popescu (born 12 August 1962) is a retired Romanian high jumper.

He finished seventh at the 1983 European Indoor Championships and at the 1986 European Championships, eighth at the 1987 European Indoor Championships and eleventh at the 1994 European Indoor Championships. He became national champion in 1983, 1987-1990, 1993, 1994, 1998 and 1999. He also competed at the 1983 World Championships as well as the World Indoor Championships in 1987 and 1995 without reaching the final round.

His personal best jump was 2.32 metres, achieved in August 1988 in Piteşti. This ranks him second among Romanian high jumpers, only behind Sorin Matei.
