= Tomohiro Nomura =

Japanese high jumper

Personal information
- Nationality: Japanese
- Born: 11 October 1975 (age 50) Aichi Prefecture, Japan

Sport
- Sport: Athletics
- Event: High jump
- Club: Conditioning advisor

Tomohiro Nomura (野村 智宏, Nomura Tomohiro; born 11 October 1975) is a Japanese track and field athlete. He competed in the men's high jump at the 1996 Summer Olympics.
