= Aliaksandr Viarutsin =

Belarusian high jumper

Aliaksandr Viarutsin (Belarusian: Аляксандар Вяруцін; born 18 November 1979) is a retired Belarusian high jumper.

He won a bronze medal at the 1998 World Junior Championships and a silver medal at the 2001 European U23 Championships.

He later won the bronze medal at the 2003 Summer Universiade, and competed at the 2002 European Indoor Championships without reaching the final.

His personal best is 2.25 metres, achieved in May 2004 in Brest. His indoor best is 2.28 metres, achieved in February 2002 in Wuppertal.
