= István Kovács (high jumper) =

Hungarian high jumper

Personal information
- Born: 9 October 1973 (age 53)

Sport
- Sport: Track and field

István Kovács (born 9 October 1973) is a retired Hungarian high jumper.

He competed at the 1997 World Indoor Championships without reaching the final round. He became Hungarian high jump champion in 1996 and 1997, as well as indoor champion in 1995 and 1997.
