= List of Belarusian Athletics Championships winners =

The Belarusian Athletics Championships is an annual outdoor track and field competition organised by the Belarusian Athletic Federation, which serves as the national championship for the sport in Belarus. The event was first held in 1992, following the dissolution of the Soviet Union.

== Men ==
=== 100 metres ===
- 1992: Sergey Kornelyuk
- 1993: Leonid Safronnikov
- 1994: Aleksandr Shlychkov (UKR)
- 1995: Sergey Kornelyuk
- 1996: Sergey Kornelyuk
- 1997: Sergey Kornelyuk
- 1998: Leonid Safronnikov
- 1999: Aleksandr Slyunkov
- 2000: Yuriy Rydevskiy
- 2001: Aleksandr Slyunkov
- 2002: Vyacheslav Aliyev
- 2003: Yuriy Bagatka
- 2004: Dmitriy Golub
- 2005: Maksim Piskunov
- 2006: Maksim Piskunov

=== 200 metres ===
- 1992: Sergey Kornelyuk
- 1993: Leonid Safronnikov
- 1994: Leonid Safronnikov
- 1995: Sergey Kornelyuk
- 1996: Leonid Safronnikov
- 1997: Andrey Gavrilenko (UKR)
- 1998: Dmitriy Kotenkov
- 1999: Aleksandr Slyunkov
- 2000: ?
- 2001: Aleksandr Slyunkov
- 2002: Vitaliy Chechetko
- 2003: Maksim Piskunov
- 2004: Maksim Sidorenko
- 2005: Maksim Piskunov
- 2006: Maksim Piskunov

=== 400 metres ===
- 1992: Sergey Molchan
- 1993: Sergey Molchan
- 1994: Sergey Molchan
- 1995: Aleksandr Titov
- 1996: Dmitriy Kotenkov
- 1997: Dmitriy Nesterenko
- 1998: Sergey Kozlov
- 1999: Andrey Kudryavtsev
- 2000: Sergey Kozlov
- 2001: Sergey Kozlov
- 2002: Maksim Sidorenko
- 2003: Sergey Kozlov
- 2004: Sergey Kozlov
- 2005: Sergey Kozlov
- 2006: Sergey Kozlov

=== 800 metres ===
- 1992: Andrey Shimanskiy
- 1993: Ivan Komar
- 1994: Ivan Komar
- 1995: Anatoliy Butkovskiy
- 1996: Boris Kaveshnikov (KGZ)
- 1997: Sergey Yakovlev
- 1998: Ivan Komar
- 1999: Aleksandr Trutko
- 2000: Pavel Pelepyagin
- 2001: Aleksandr Trutko
- 2002: Pavel Pelepyagin
- 2003: Mark Romanchuk
- 2004: Aleksandr Trutko
- 2005: Aleksandr Trutko
- 2006: Vitalij Kozlov (LTU)

=== 1500 metres ===
- 1992: Vadim Polyakov
- 1993: Andrey Gorbatsevich
- 1994: Ivan Komar
- 1995: Azat Rakipov
- 1996: Vladimir Dukhovich
- 1997: Vasiliy Sanko
- 1998: Aleksandr Lukashenko
- 1999: Vladimir Dukhovich
- 2000: Azat Rakipov
- 2001: Mark Romanchuk
- 2002: Andrey Degtyarov
- 2003: Aleksandr Donchenko
- 2004: Aleksandr Busel
- 2005: Mark Romanchuk
- 2006: Andrey Korotko

=== 5000 metres ===
- 1992: I. Mazepa
- 1993: Oleg Savelyev
- 1994: Aleksey Tarasyuk
- 1995: Alexei Scutaru (MDA)
- 1996: Sergey Dubina
- 1997: ?
- 1998: Sergey Dubina
- 1999: Sergey Dubina
- 2000: Azat Rakipov
- 2001: Dmitriy Dobovskiy
- 2002: Yuriy Baltsevich
- 2003: Igor Teteryukov
- 2004: Igor Teteryukov
- 2005: Aleksandr Donchenko
- 2006: Andrey Gordeyev

=== 10,000 metres ===
- 1992: Oleg Savelyev
- 1993: Yuriy Brandes
- 1994: Azat Rakipov
- 1995: Vladimir Tonchinskiy
- 1996: Zorislav Gapeyenko
- 1997: ?
- 1998: Zorislav Gapeyenko
- 1999: Vladimir Tyamchik
- 2000: ?
- 2001: Zorislav Gapeyenko
- 2002: Dmytro Baranovskyy
- 2003: Viktor Lomonosov
- 2004: Igor Teteryukov
- 2005: Ruslan Sadovskiy
- 2006: Igor Teteryukov

=== 3000 metres steeplechase ===
- 1992: Vasiliy Omelyusik
- 1993: Aleksey Tarasyuk
- 1994: Vasiliy Omelyusik
- 1995: Aleksey Tarasyuk
- 1996: Vasiliy Omelyusik
- 1997: ?
- 1998: Igor Zhavoronok
- 1999: Igor Zhavoronok
- 2000: ?
- 2001: Igor Zhavoronok
- 2002: Igor Zhavoronok
- 2003: ?
- 2004: Pavel Dranitsa
- 2005: Vitaliy Piskun
- 2006: Sergey Berdnik

=== 110 metres hurdles ===
- 1992: Dmitriy Sereda
- 1993: Sergey Usov
- 1994: Mikhail Ryabukhin
- 1995: Alexandru Enico (MDA)
- 1996: Igor Borisov
- 1997: Igor Borisov
- 1998: Igor Borisov
- 1999: Sergey Khodanovich
- 2000: ?
- 2001: Dmitriy Sereda
- 2002: Sergey Khodanovich
- 2003: Maksim Linsha
- 2004: Andrey Shalonko
- 2005: Maksim Linsha
- 2006: Maksim Linsha

=== 400 metres hurdles ===
- 1992: Valeriy Dauksha
- 1993: Igor Kurochkin
- 1994: Aleksey Fursa
- 1995: Igor Kurochkin
- 1996: Igor Lisitsin
- 1997: Leonid Vershinin
- 1998: Leonid Vershinin
- 1999: Leonid Vershinin
- 2000: ?
- 2001: Leonid Vershinin
- 2002: Yevgeniy Mikheyko
- 2003: Leonid Vershinin
- 2004: Leonid Vershinin
- 2005: Leonid Vershinin
- 2006: Leonid Vershinin

=== High jump ===
- 1992: Vladimir Zaboronyok
- 1993: Oleg Zhukovskiy
- 1994: Nikolay Moskalev
- 1995: Gintaras Varanauskas (LTU)
- 1996: Aleksandr Buglakov
- 1997: Oleg Vorobey
- 1998: Oleg Vorobey
- 1999: Aleksey Lesnichiy
- 2000: Oleg Prokopov
- 2001: Aleksey Lesnichiy
- 2002: Aleksey Lesnichiy
- 2003: Aliaksandr Viarutsin
- 2004: Henadz Maroz
- 2005: Aliaksandr Viarutsin
- 2006: Aliaksandr Viarutsin

=== Pole vault ===
- 1992: Andrei Tivontchik
- 1993: Konstantin Semyonov
- 1994: Gennadiy Sidorov
- 1995: Gennadiy Sidorov
- 1996: Gennadiy Sidorov
- 1997: Igor Kravtsov
- 1998: Dmitriy Smirnov
- 1999: Dmitriy Smirnov
- 2000: ?
- 2001: Dmitriy Smirnov
- 2002: ?
- 2003: Stanislav Tivontchik
- 2004: Igor Alekseyev
- 2005: Igor Alekseyev
- 2006: Igor Alekseyev

=== Long jump ===
- 1992: Andrey Nikulin
- 1993: Viktor Rudenik
- 1994: Andrey Nikulin
- 1995: Viktor Rudenik
- 1996: Aleksandr Kravchenko
- 1997: ?
- 1998: Aleksandr Glavatskiy
- 1999: Andrey Mikhalkevich
- 2000: Andrey Shablovskiy
- 2001: Gennadiy Puzikov
- 2002: Gennadiy Puzikov
- 2003: Andrey Shablovskiy
- 2004: Maksim Nesteruk
- 2005: Aleksey Postupailo
- 2006: Maksim Nesteruk

=== Triple jump ===
- 1992: Andrey Zirko
- 1993: Oleg Denishchik
- 1994: Viktor Sazankov
- 1995: Viktor Sazankov
- 1996: Viktor Sazankov
- 1997: Viktor Sazankov
- 1998: Aleksandr Glavatskiy
- 1999: Viktor Sazankov
- 2000: Dmitriy Vasilyev
- 2001: Aleksandr Glavatskiy
- 2002: Dmitrij Vaľukevič
- 2003: Aleksandr Furso
- 2004: Andrey Yakovchik
- 2005: Dzmitry Dziatsuk
- 2006: Aleksandr Vorobey

=== Shot put ===
- 1992: Mikhail Kostin
- 1993: Aleksandr Klimov
- 1994: Dmitriy Goncharuk
- 1995: Aleksandr Klimov
- 1996: Dzimitry Hancharuk
- 1997: Dzimitry Hancharuk
- 1998: Viktor Bulat
- 1999: Viktor Bulat
- 2000: Andrei Mikhnevich
- 2001: Pavel Lyzhyn
- 2002: Yury Bialou
- 2003: Dzimitry Hancharuk
- 2004: Pavel Lyzhyn
- 2005: Andrei Mikhnevich
- 2006: Andrei Mikhnevich

=== Discus throw ===
- 1992: Vasiliy Kaptyukh
- 1993: Vladimir Dubrovshchik
- 1994: Vladimir Dubrovshchik
- 1995: Vladimir Dubrovshchik
- 1996: Vladimir Dubrovshchik
- 1997: Leonid Cherevko
- 1998: Leonid Cherevko
- 1999: Vladimir Dubrovshchik
- 2000: Leonid Cherevko
- 2001: Aliaksandr Malashevich
- 2002: Leonid Cherevko
- 2003: Vasiliy Kaptyukh
- 2004: Vasiliy Kaptyukh
- 2005: Ehsan Haddadi (IRI)
- 2006: Aliaksandr Malashevich

=== Hammer throw ===
- 1992: Vitaliy Alisevich
- 1993: Sergey Alay
- 1994: Vitaliy Alisevich
- 1995: Konstantin Astapkovich
- 1996: Mikhail Popel
- 1997: Igor Astapkovich
- 1998: Konstantin Astapkovich
- 1999: Konstantin Astapkovich
- 2000: Vadim Devyatovskiy
- 2001: Ivan Tsikhan
- 2002: Ivan Tsikhan
- 2003: Ivan Tsikhan
- 2004: Ivan Tsikhan
- 2005: Ivan Tsikhan
- 2006: Vadim Devyatovskiy

=== Javelin throw ===
- 1992: ?
- 1993: Nikolay Kosyanok
- 1994: Oleg Gotsko
- 1995: Sergey Gordienko
- 1996: Andrey Khodasevich
- 1997: Vladimir Sasimovich
- 1998: Aleksandr Kulesh
- 1999: Igor Lisovskiy
- 2000: Vladimir Sasimovich
- 2001: Pavel Stasyuk
- 2002: Pavel Stasyuk
- 2003: Vladimir Sasimovich
- 2004: Mehdi Ravaei (IRI)
- 2005: Nikolay Vasilyachov
- 2006: Vadim Yautukhovich

=== Decathlon ===
- 1992: Aleksandr Zhdanovich
- 1993: Aleksandr Zhdanovich
- 1994: Yuriy Lekunovich
- 1995: Dmitriy Sukhomazov
- 1996: Mikhail Volk
- 1997: Mikhail Volk
- 1998: Dmitriy Sukhomazov
- 1999: Gennadiy Sitkevich
- 2000: ?
- 2001: Aliaksandr Parkhomenka
- 2002: Aliaksandr Parkhomenka
- 2003: Aliaksandr Parkhomenka
- 2004: Valeriy Poklad
- 2005: Aleksandr Korzun
- 2006: Aliaksandr Parkhomenka

=== 20 kilometres walk ===
The race was held on a track in 1998, 1999, 2000 and 2006.

- 1993: Yevgeniy Misyulya
- 1994: Mikhail Khmelnitskiy
- 1995: Viktor Ginko
- 1996: ?
- 1997: ?
- 1998: Vitaliy Gordey
- 1999: Andrey Makarov (RUS)
- 2000: Vitaliy Gordey
- 2001: ?
- 2002: Ivan Trotski
- 2003: Andrey Makarov
- 2004: Andrey Talashko
- 2005: Andrey Talashko
- 2006: Andrey Talashko

=== 50 kilometres walk ===
- 1993: Viktor Ginko

== Women ==
=== 100 metres ===
- 1992: Natalya Zhuk
- 1993: Yelena Denishchik
- 1994: Natallia Safronnikava
- 1995: Natallia Safronnikava
- 1996: Natallia Safronnikava
- 1997: Natallia Safronnikava
- 1998: Natallia Safronnikava
- 1999: Natallia Safronnikava
- 2000: Tatyana Barashko
- 2001: Aksana Drahun
- 2002: Yulia Nestsiarenka
- 2003: Alena Newmyarzhytskaya
- 2004: Aksana Drahun
- 2005: Natallia Solohub
- 2006: Alena Newmyarzhytskaya

=== 200 metres ===
- 1992: Natalya Zhuk
- 1993: Yelena Denishchik
- 1994: Margarita Molchan
- 1995: Natallia Safronnikava
- 1996: Natallia Safronnikava
- 1997: Natallia Safronnikava
- 1998: Natallia Safronnikava
- 1999: Natallia Solohub
- 2000: ?
- 2001: Natalya Abramenko
- 2002: Natallia Safronnikava
- 2003: Alena Newmyarzhytskaya
- 2004: Natallia Solohub
- 2005: Natallia Solohub
- 2006: Natalya Abramenko

=== 400 metres ===
- 1992: Natalya Ignatyuk
- 1993: Irina Skvarchevskaya
- 1994: Anna Kozak
- 1995: Anna Kozak
- 1996: Anna Kozak
- 1997: Anna Kozak
- 1998: Anna Kozak
- 1999: Natallia Solohub
- 2000: Natallia Solohub
- 2001: Anna Kozak
- 2002: Sviatlana Usovich
- 2003: Iryna Khliustava
- 2004: Iryna Khliustava
- 2005: Anna Kozak
- 2006: Ilona Usovich

=== 800 metres ===
- 1992: Natalya Dukhnova
- 1993: Natalya Dukhnova
- 1994: Yelena Bychkovskaya
- 1995: Yelena Bychkovskaya
- 1996: Natalya Dukhnova
- 1997: Yelena Konchits
- 1998: Viktoriya Lysakova
- 1999: Natalya Dukhnova
- 2000: Tatyana Buloychik
- 2001: Natalya Vasko
- 2002: Natalya Dedkova
- 2003: Natalya Dukhnova
- 2004: Irina Pechennikova
- 2005: Svetlana Klimkovich
- 2006: Svetlana Klimkovich

=== 1500 metres ===
- 1992: Oksana Mernikova
- 1993: Oksana Mernikova
- 1994: Yelena Bychkovskaya
- 1995: Yelena Bychkovskaya
- 1996: Natalya Dukhnova
- 1997: Yelena Bychkovskaya
- 1998: Alesia Turava
- 1999: Natalya Dukhnova
- 2000: Tatyana Buloychik
- 2001: Svetlana Klimkovich
- 2002: ?
- 2003: Svetlana Klimkovich
- 2004: Anastasiya Starovoytova
- 2005: Volha Krautsova
- 2006: Svetlana Klimkovich

=== 3000 metres ===
- 1992: Tatyana Nefedeva
- 1993: Galina Baruk
- 1994: Alena Mazouka
- 1995: Not held
- 1996: Not held
- 1997: Not held
- 1998: Not held
- 1999: Not held
- 2000: Not held
- 2001: Svetlana Klimkovich
- 2002: Svetlana Klimkovich

=== 5000 metres ===
- 1995: Tatyana Nefedeva
- 1996: Tatyana Nefedeva
- 1997: ?
- 1998: Yelena Tolstygina
- 1999: Alena Mazouka
- 2000: ?
- 2001: Alina Taustyhina
- 2002: ?
- 2003: Tatyana Belkina
- 2004: Volha Krautsova
- 2005: Irina Kunakhovets
- 2006: Anastasiya Starovoytova

=== 10,000 metres ===
- 1992: Galina Baruk
- 1993: Yelena Vinitskaya
- 1994: Alena Mazouka
- 1995: Alena Mazouka
- 1996: Alena Mazouka
- 1997: Alena Mazouka
- 1998: Halina Karnatsevich
- 1999: Alena Mazouka
- 2000: Oksana Vasylevska
- 2001: Alina Taustyhina
- 2002: Natalya Vasilevskaya
- 2003: Alena Mazouka
- 2004: Natalia Cercheș (MDA)
- 2005: Halina Karnatsevich
- 2006: Volha Krautsova

=== 2000 metres steeplechase ===
- 1995: Yelena Grishko
- 1996: Tereza Barkovskaya
- 1997: ?
- 1998: Yelena Grishko
- 1999: Inna Ruklo

=== 3000 metres steeplechase ===
- 2000: ?
- 2001: Inna Ruklo
- 2002: ?
- 2003: ?
- 2004: Natalya Grigoryeva
- 2005: Natalya Grigoryeva
- 2006: Alesia Turava

=== 100 metres hurdles ===
- 1992: Svetlana Buraga
- 1993: Svetlana Buraga
- 1994: Lidiya Yurkova
- 1995: Lidiya Yurkova
- 1996: Tamara Podretskaya
- 1997: Tamara Kadyrova
- 1998: Taisiya Dobrovitskaya
- 1999: Tatyana Ledovskaya
- 2000: Taisiya Dobrovitskaya
- 2001: Yevgeniya Likhuta
- 2002: Yevgeniya Likhuta
- 2003: Yevgeniya Likhuta
- 2004: Yevgeniya Likhuta
- 2005: Yevgeniya Likhuta
- 2006: Yevgeniya Likhuta

=== 400 metres hurdles ===
- 1992: Tatyana Kurochkina
- 1993: Tatyana Kurochkina
- 1994: Natalya Ignatyuk
- 1995: Tatyana Ledovskaya
- 1996: Tatyana Ledovskaya
- 1997: Tatyana Ledovskaya
- 1998: Tatyana Kurochkina
- 1999: Tatyana Kurochkina
- 2000: Tatyana Kurochkina
- 2001: Tatyana Kurochkina
- 2002: Tatyana Kurochkina
- 2003: Inna Kalinina
- 2004: Inna Kalinina
- 2005: Inna Kalinina
- 2006: Kristina Vedernikova

=== High jump ===
- 1992: Tatsiana Sheuchyk
- 1993: Galina Isachenko
- 1994: Tatsiana Sheuchyk
- 1995: Tatyana Gulevich
- 1996: Tatyana Khramova
- 1997: Tatyana Khramova
- 1998: Tatyana Gulevich
- 1999: Tatyana Gulevich
- 2000: Tatsiana Sheuchyk
- 2001: Tatyana Gulevich
- 2002: Tatyana Gulevich
- 2003: Olga Klimova
- 2004: Olga Chuprova
- 2005: Irina Chuyko
- 2006: Alesya Gerasimova

=== Pole vault ===
- 1997: Galina Isachenko
- 1998: Galina Isachenko
- 1999: Yuliya Taratynova
- 2000: ?
- 2001: Svetlana Makarevich
- 2002: Yuliya Taratynova
- 2003: Yekaterina Arkhipova
- 2004: Nadezhda Fiyalo
- 2005: Yekaterina Arkhipova
- 2006: Yuliya Taratynova

=== Long jump ===
- 1992: Olga Roslyakova
- 1993: Anzhela Atroschenko
- 1994: Larisa Kuchinskaya
- 1995: Larisa Kuchinskaya
- 1996: Natallia Sazanovich
- 1997: Yelena Lemeshevskaya
- 1998: Larisa Kuchinskaya
- 1999: Larisa Kuchinskaya
- 2000: Natallia Safronava
- 2001: Irina Chernushenko
- 2002: Irina Chernushenko
- 2003: Irina Chernushenko
- 2004: Anzhela Zhalnerchik
- 2005: Anzhela Zhalnerchik
- 2006: Natallia Safronava

=== Triple jump ===
- 1992: Yelena Stakhova
- 1993: Yelena Stakhova
- 1994: Natallia Safronava
- 1995: Zhanna Gureyeva
- 1996: Yelena Stakhova
- 1997: Zhanna Gureyeva
- 1998: Natallia Safronava
- 1999: Zhanna Gureyeva
- 2000: Natallia Safronava
- 2001: Natallia Safronava
- 2002: Natallia Safronava
- 2003: Natallia Safronava
- 2004: Olesya Lesun
- 2005: Olesya Lesun
- 2006: Natallia Safronava

=== Shot put ===
- 1992: Tatyana Khorkhuleva
- 1993: Natalya Gurskaya
- 1994: Natalya Gurskaya
- 1995: Natalya Gurskaya
- 1996: Tatyana Khorkhuleva
- 1997: Yanina Karolchyk-Pravalinskaya
- 1998: Yanina Karolchyk-Pravalinskaya
- 1999: Nadzeya Astapchuk
- 2000: Nadzeya Astapchuk
- 2001: Natallia Mikhnevich
- 2002: Yelena Ivanenko
- 2003: Yelena Ivanenko
- 2004: Natallia Mikhnevich
- 2005: Natallia Mikhnevich
- 2006: Natallia Mikhnevich

=== Discus throw ===
- 1992: Lyudmila Filimonova
- 1993: Ellina Zvereva
- 1994: Lyudmila Filimonova
- 1995: Lyudmila Filimonova
- 1996: Lyudmila Filimonova
- 1997: Iryna Yatchenko
- 1998: Lyudmila Filimonova
- 1999: Ellina Zvereva
- 2000: Lyudmila Starovoytova
- 2001: Lyudmila Starovoytova
- 2002: Lyudmila Starovoytova
- 2003: Iryna Yatchenko
- 2004: Iryna Yatchenko
- 2005: Ellina Zvereva
- 2006: Ellina Zvereva

=== Hammer throw ===
- 1992: Sviatlana Sudak Torun
- 1993: Sviatlana Sudak Torun
- 1994: Sviatlana Sudak Torun
- 1995: Sviatlana Sudak Torun
- 1996: Lyudmila Gubkina
- 1997: Sviatlana Sudak Torun
- 1998: Sviatlana Sudak Torun
- 1999: Sviatlana Sudak Torun
- 2000: Lyudmila Gubkina
- 2001: Tatyana Gromada
- 2002: Volha Tsander
- 2003: Volha Tsander
- 2004: Volha Tsander
- 2005: Volha Tsander
- 2006: Volha Tsander

=== Javelin throw ===
- 1992: ?
- 1993: Tatyana Shikolenko
- 1994: Natalya Yermolovich
- 1995: Alina Serdyuk
- 1996: Alina Serdyuk
- 1997: ?
- 1998: Oksana Velichko
- 1999: Alina Serdyuk
- 2000: ?
- 2001: Oksana Velichko
- 2002: Galina Kakhova
- 2003: Marina Novik
- 2004: Natalya Shimchuk
- 2005: Natalya Shimchuk
- 2006: Natalya Shimchuk

=== Heptathlon ===
- 1992: Taisiya Dobrovitskaya
- 1993: Taisiya Dobrovitskaya
- 1994: Anzhela Andrukevich
- 1995: Anzhela Andrukevich
- 1996: Natallia Sazanovich
- 1997: Svetlana Buraga
- 1998: Taisiya Dobrovitskaya
- 1999: Taisiya Dobrovitskaya
- 2000: ?
- 2001: Taisiya Dobrovitskaya
- 2002: Iryna Butar
- 2003: ?
- 2004: Tatyana Alisevich
- 2005: Tatyana Alisevich
- 2006: Tatyana Zhaunova

=== 10 kilometres walk ===
The event was held on a track from 1997 to 2000.

- 1993: Valentina Tsybulskaya
- 1994: Valentina Tsybulskaya
- 1995: Olga Kardopoltseva
- 1996: ?
- 1997: Lyudmila Dolgopolova
- 1998: Larisa Ramazanova
- 1999: Valentina Tsybulskaya
- 2000: Ryta Turava

=== 20 kilometres walk ===
The event was held on a track in 2006.

- 2001: ?
- 2002: ?
- 2003: Lyudmila Dolgopolova
- 2004: Elena Ginko
- 2005: Lyudmila Yegorova (UKR)
- 2006: Elena Ginko
