= Pärnu Rannastaadion =

Multi-purpose stadium in Pärnu, Estonia

Coordinates: 58°22′28.82″N 24°30′12.46″E

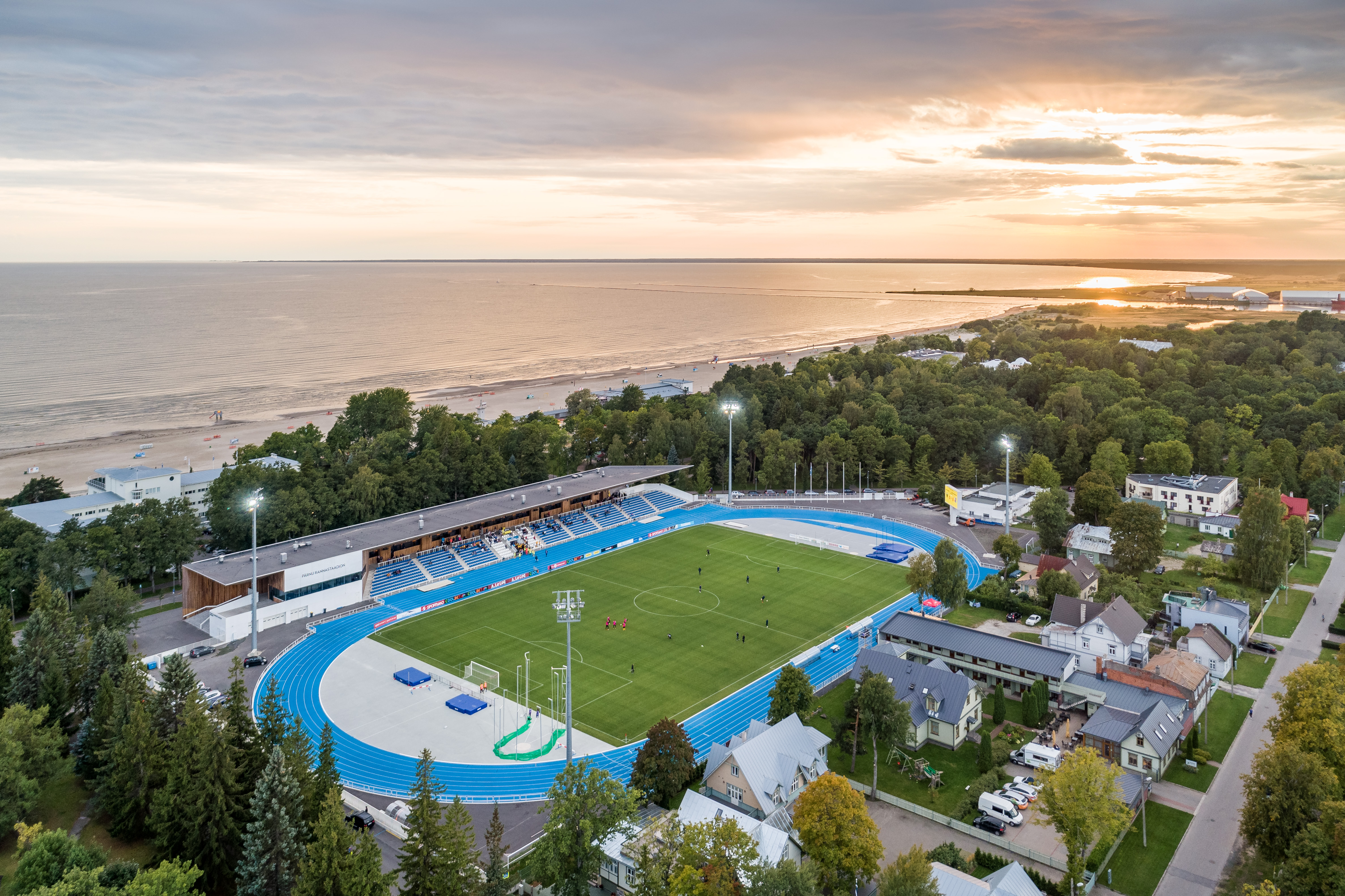
- Interactive map of Pärnu Rannastaadion
- Former names: Pärnu Stadium, Pärnu Kalev Stadium
- Location: Pärnu, Estonia
- Owner: City of Pärnu
- Capacity: 1,501
- Surface: Grass
- Record attendance: 2,515 (Estonia vs Malta, 31 August 2016)
- Field size: 105 m × 67 m (344 ft × 220 ft)

Construction
- Opened: 14 July 1929; 97 years ago
- Rebuilt: 2015–2016
- Cost: €5.62 million (2016)
- Architect: KAMP Arhitektid (2016)

Tenants
- Pärnu Vaprus (1929–1937, 2000–present); Pärnu Tervis (1929–1944, 1992–1996); Pärnu Jalgpalliklubi (1989–1998, 2018–2024)

Website
- spordikeskus.parnu.ee/rannastaadion/

Pärnu Rannastaadion (English: Pärnu Beach Stadium) is a multi-purpose stadium in Pärnu, Estonia, and the home ground of Pärnu JK Vaprus. The stadium was opened after reconstruction in 2016 and seats 1,501. It is located next to the Pärnu Beach and approximately 200 metres from the sea.

First opened in 1929, the stadium has had four different grandstands throughout its history and was completely reconstructed in 2015–2016. The address of the stadium is Ranna pst. 2, 80012 Pärnu.

== History ==
First sporting activities on Pärnu Rannastaadion's field date back to 1896, when a velodrome was opened by the association of German cyclists. The velodrome was destroyed in 1915 by Russian soldiers, who dug trenches on the sports field to repel a possible German landing. After Estonia gained independence, a committee was established to make plans for a stadium.

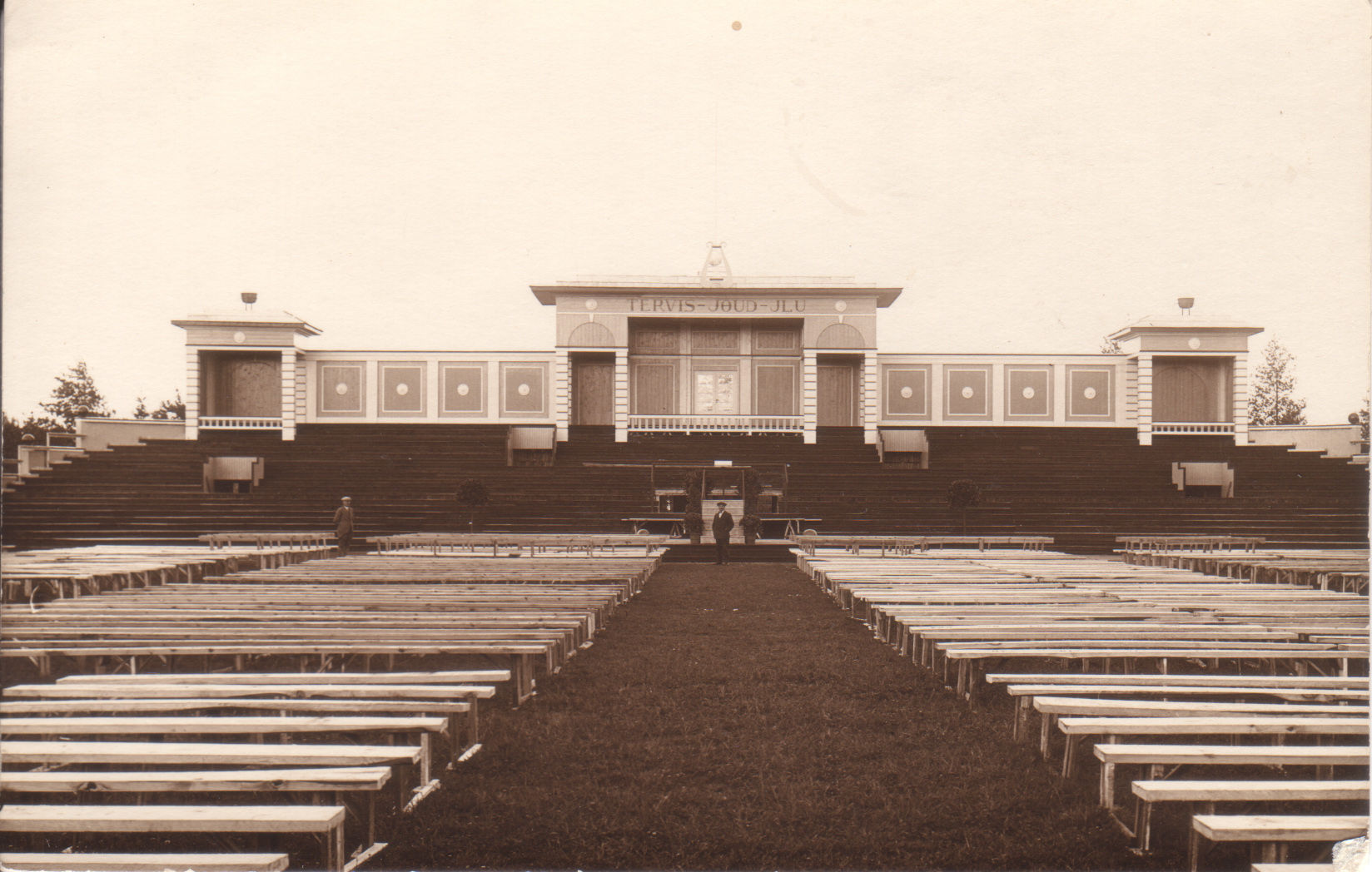
Pärnu Stadium in 1929–1933

The stadium was officially opened on 14 July 1929. The wooden grandstand, which was also built to host singing festivals, was able to seat around 700 people and was labelled as the 'finest of the Baltic states' due to its neoclassical architecture. However, the grandstand was set on fire on 9 February 1933 and the perpetrators were never caught.

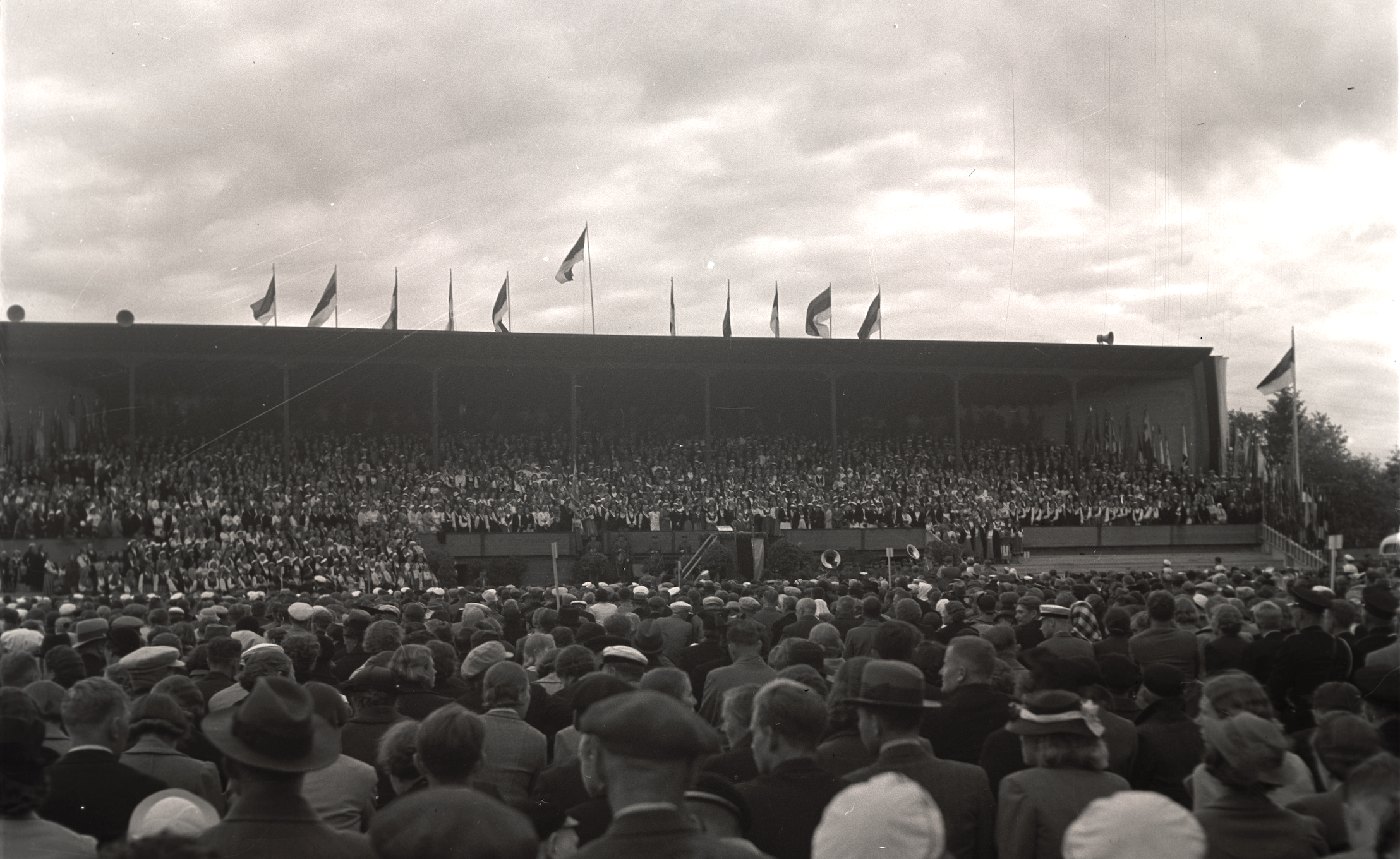
Pärnu Stadium from 1933 to 1981, considered as one of the best examples of wooden functionalism in Estonia

Five months later, on 9 July 1933, a new and larger grandstand was opened. Designed by architect Olev Siinmaa, the stadium building has later been considered as one of the best examples of 1930s wooden functionalism in Estonia. The stadium survived World War II and hosted numerous post-war Pärnumaa Song Festivals, before the historic grandstand was demolished in 1981 and the stadium's ownership was transferred to Sports Association Kalev, who renamed the stadium as Pärnu Kalevi staadion and opened a new grandstand in 1987.

Kalev however struggled with the stadium's maintenance and the complex was soon left in particularly bad condition. In 2012, the City of Pärnu revoked Kalev's rights for the stadium and held a design competition for a new grandstand, which was won by KAMP Arhitektid. The stadium was renamed Pärnu Rannastaadion and the reconstruction began in July 2015.

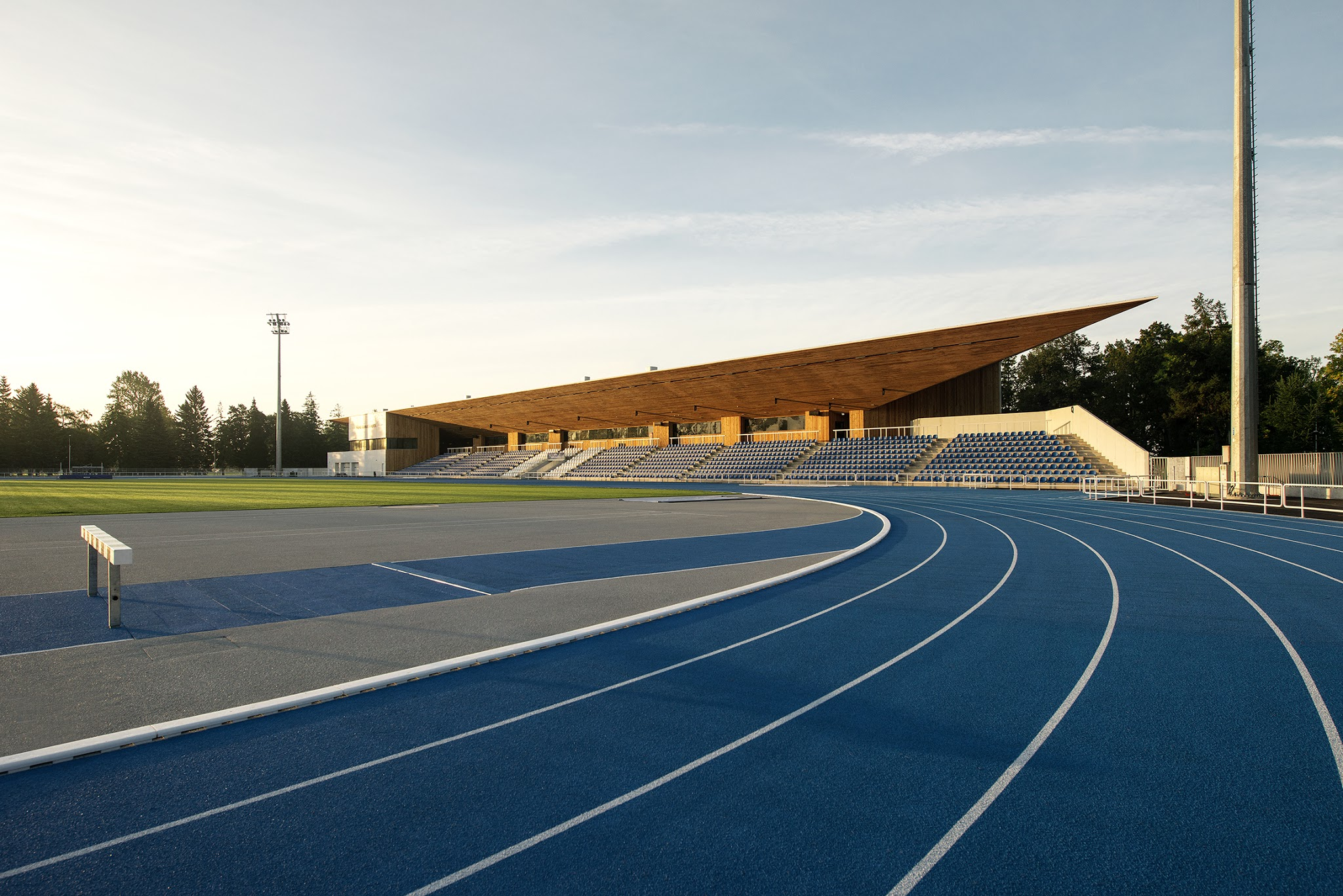
The stadium after the 2015–2016 reconstruction

Pärnu Rannastaadion was reopened on 9 July 2016 after extensive renovation works. With a total cost of 5.62 million euros, the new stadium complex also facilitates a hostel, gym, seminar rooms and a restaurant. The stadium was awarded the 2016 Union of Estonian Architects award for its outstanding architecture.

On 31 August 2016, Pärnu Rannastaadion hosted the Estonia national football team after a 17-year break, when they drew 1–1 with Malta in a friendly match. Since 2021, Pärnu has also hosted numerous UEFA Europa Conference League qualifying matches of Paide Linnameeskond.

== Galleries ==
Pärnu Rannastaadion's facade through the years

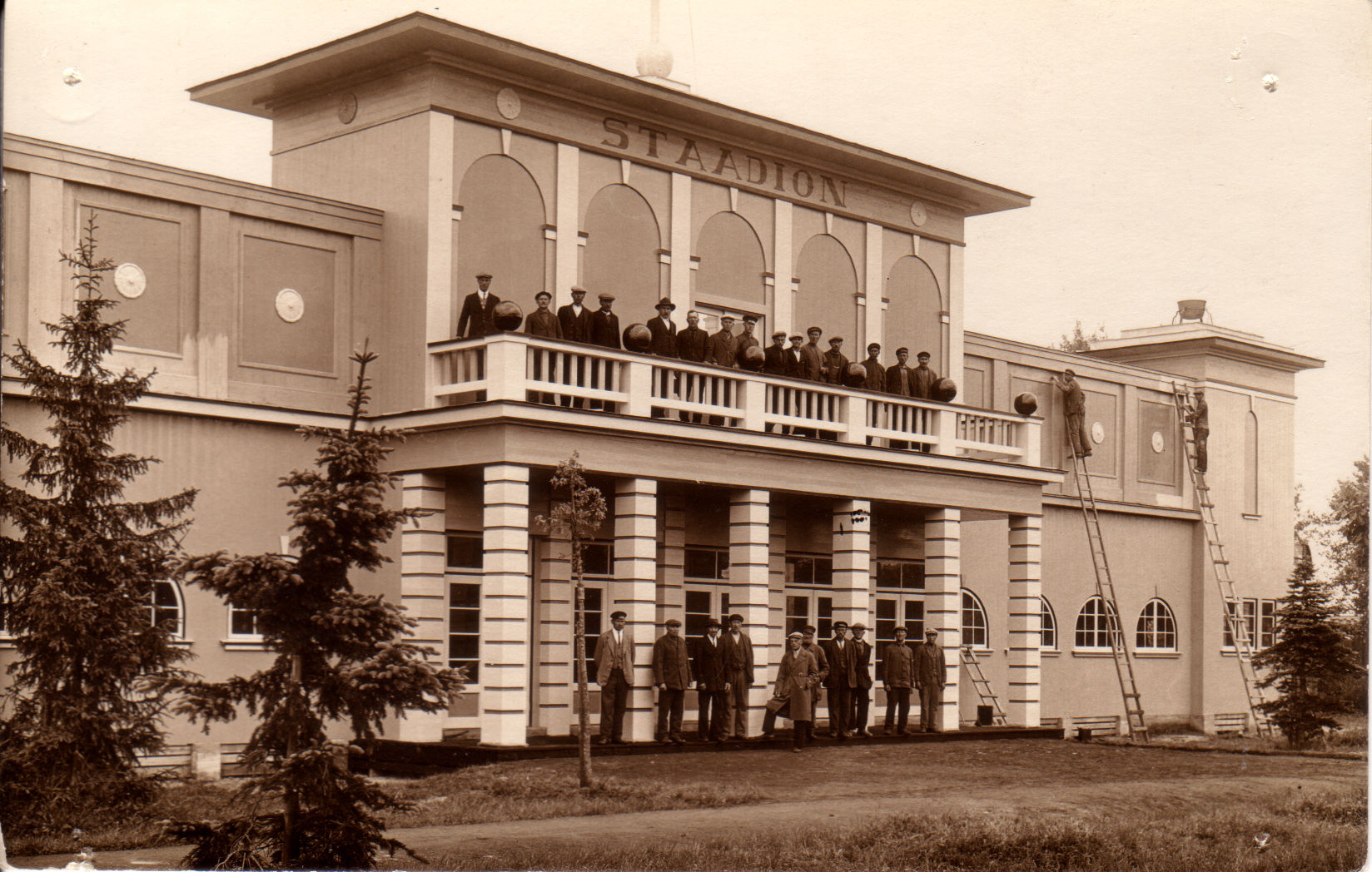
1929–1933

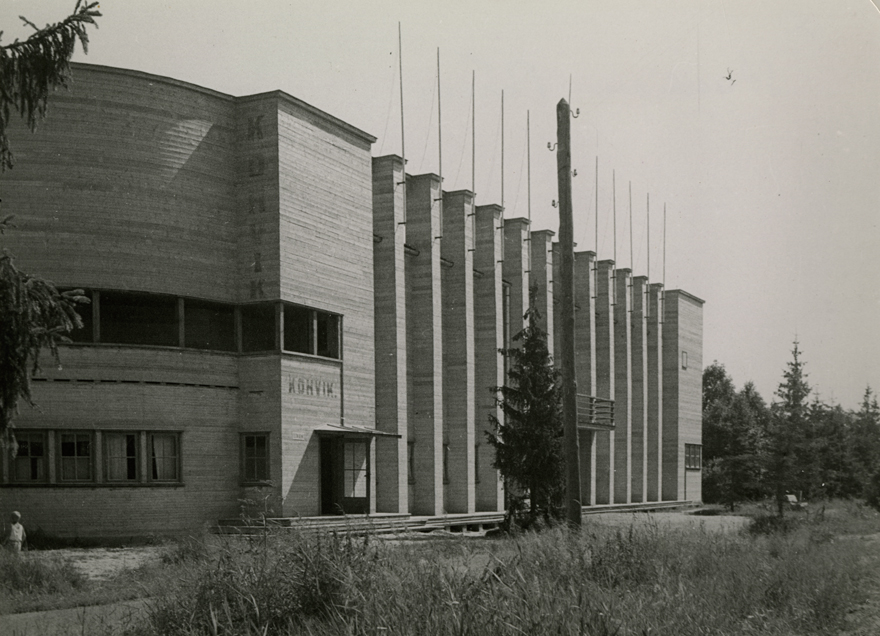
1933–1981

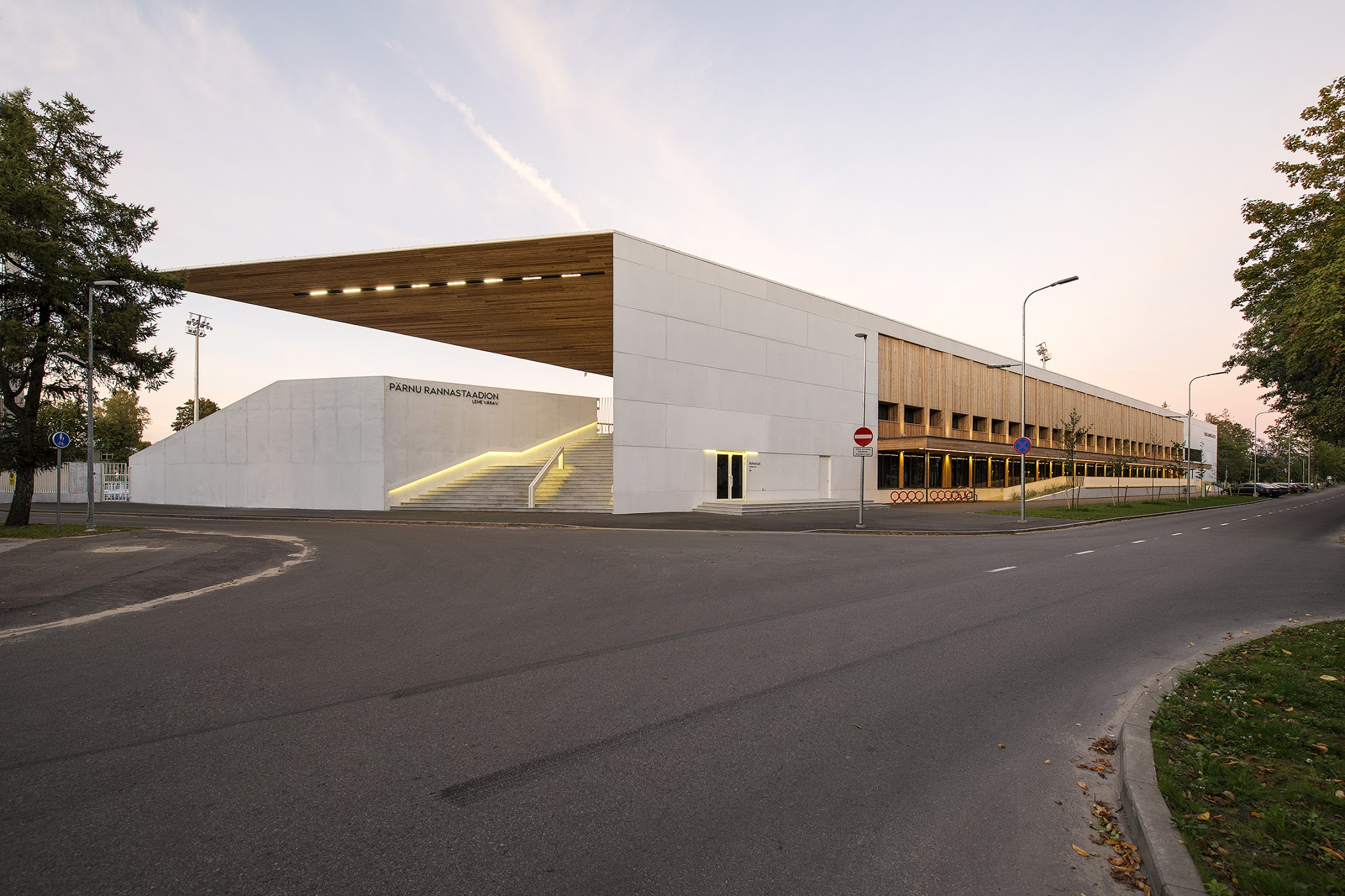
2016–present

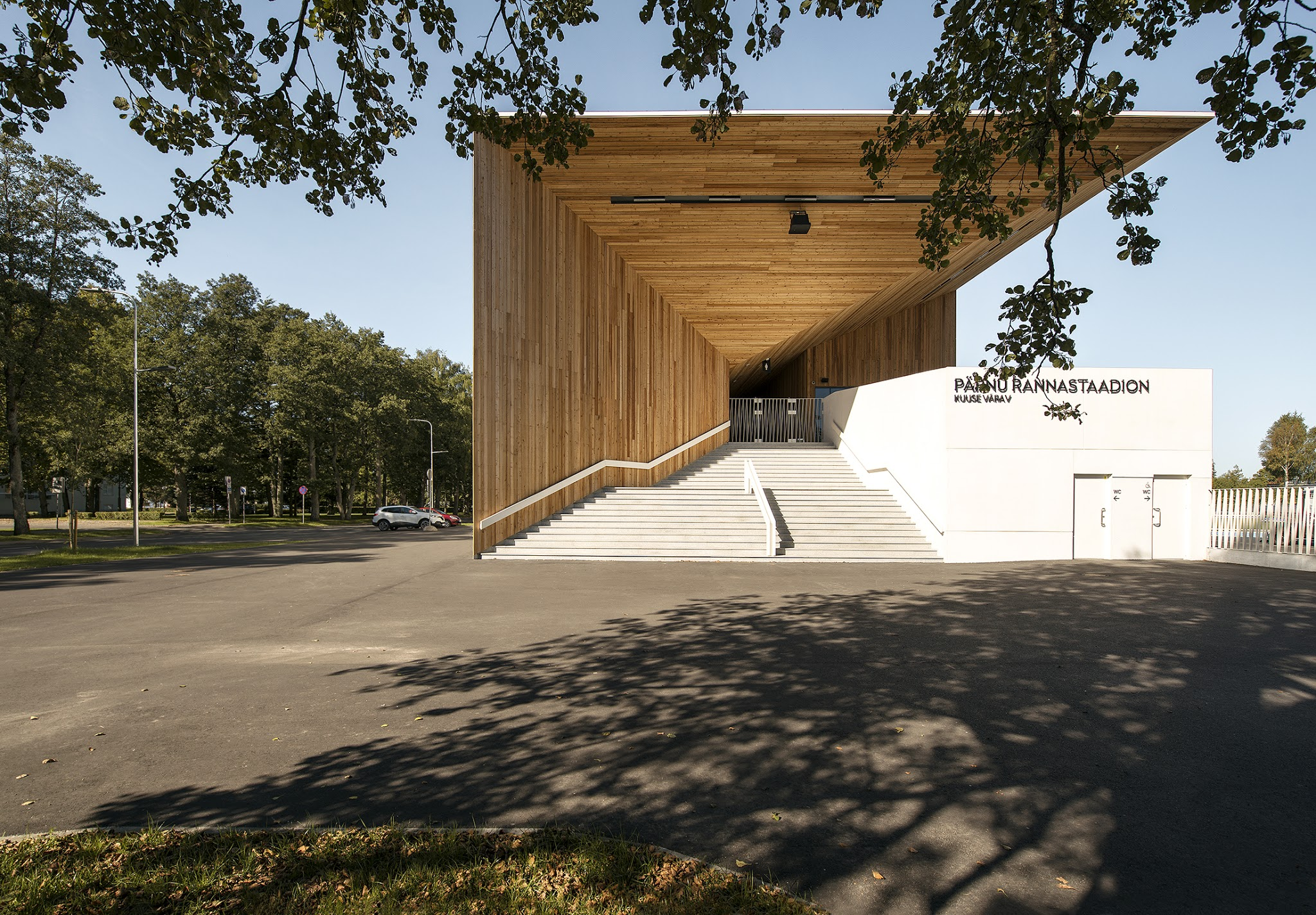
2016–present
Pärnu Rannastaadion's grandstand through the years

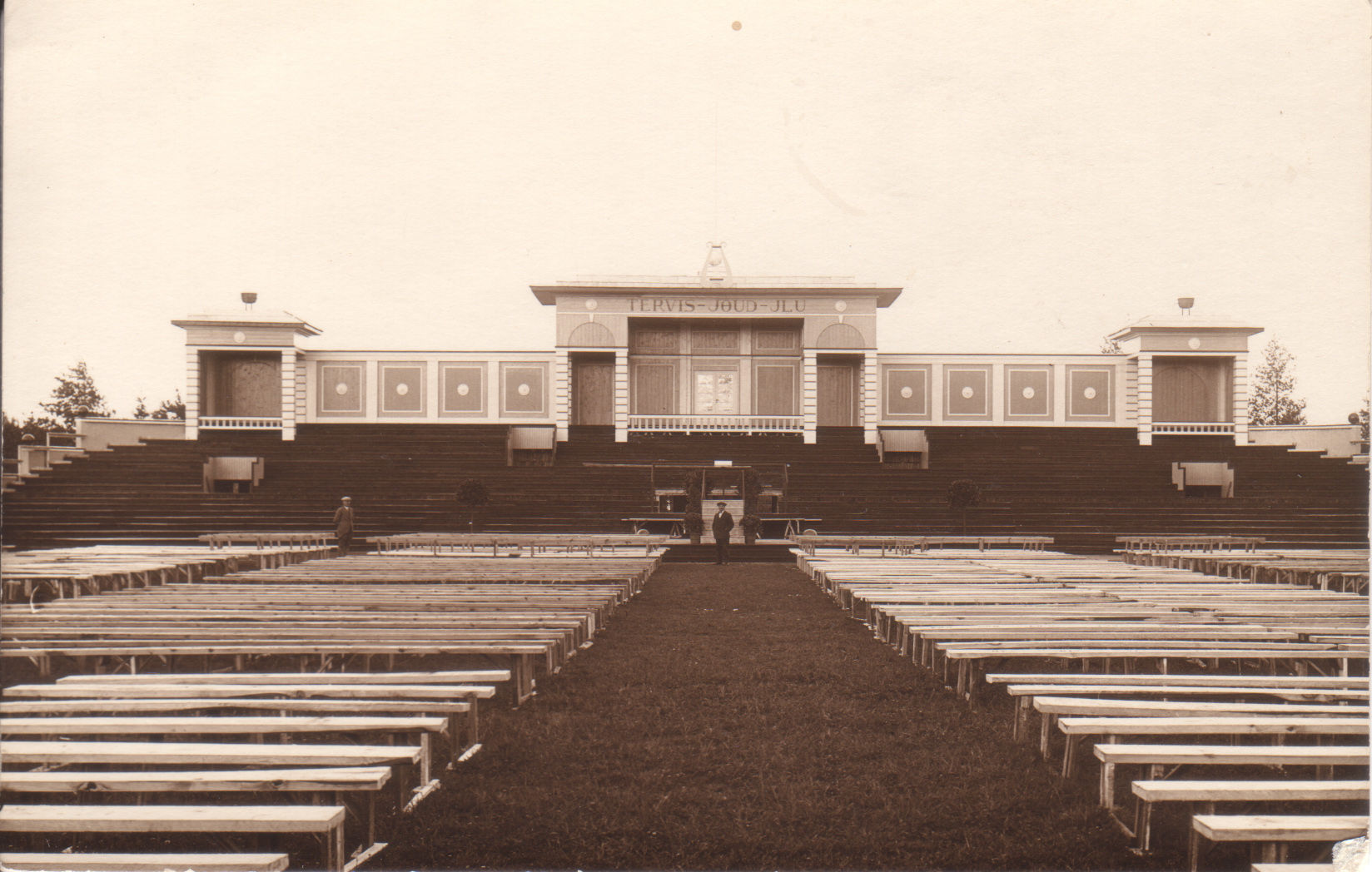
1929–1933

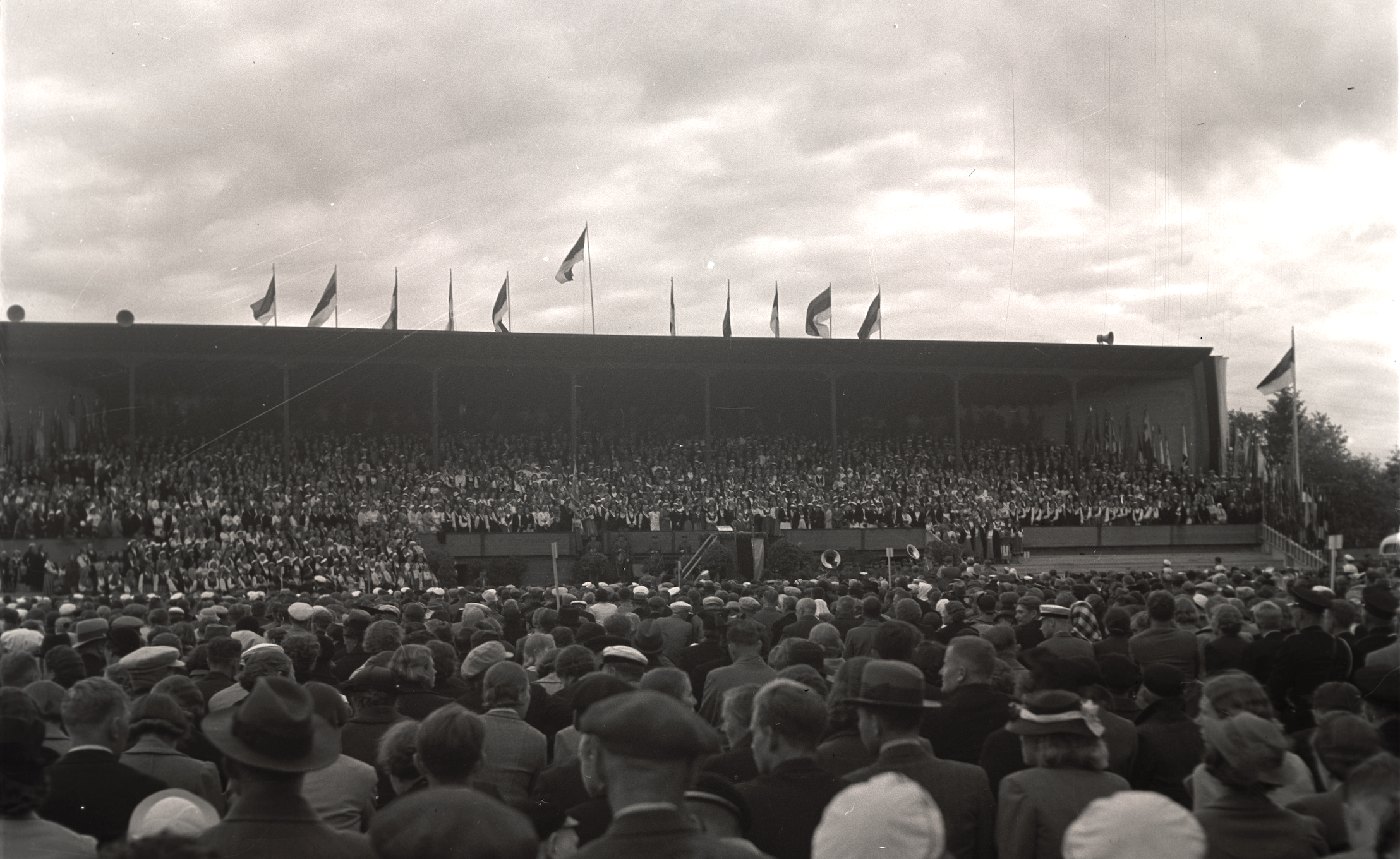
1933–1981

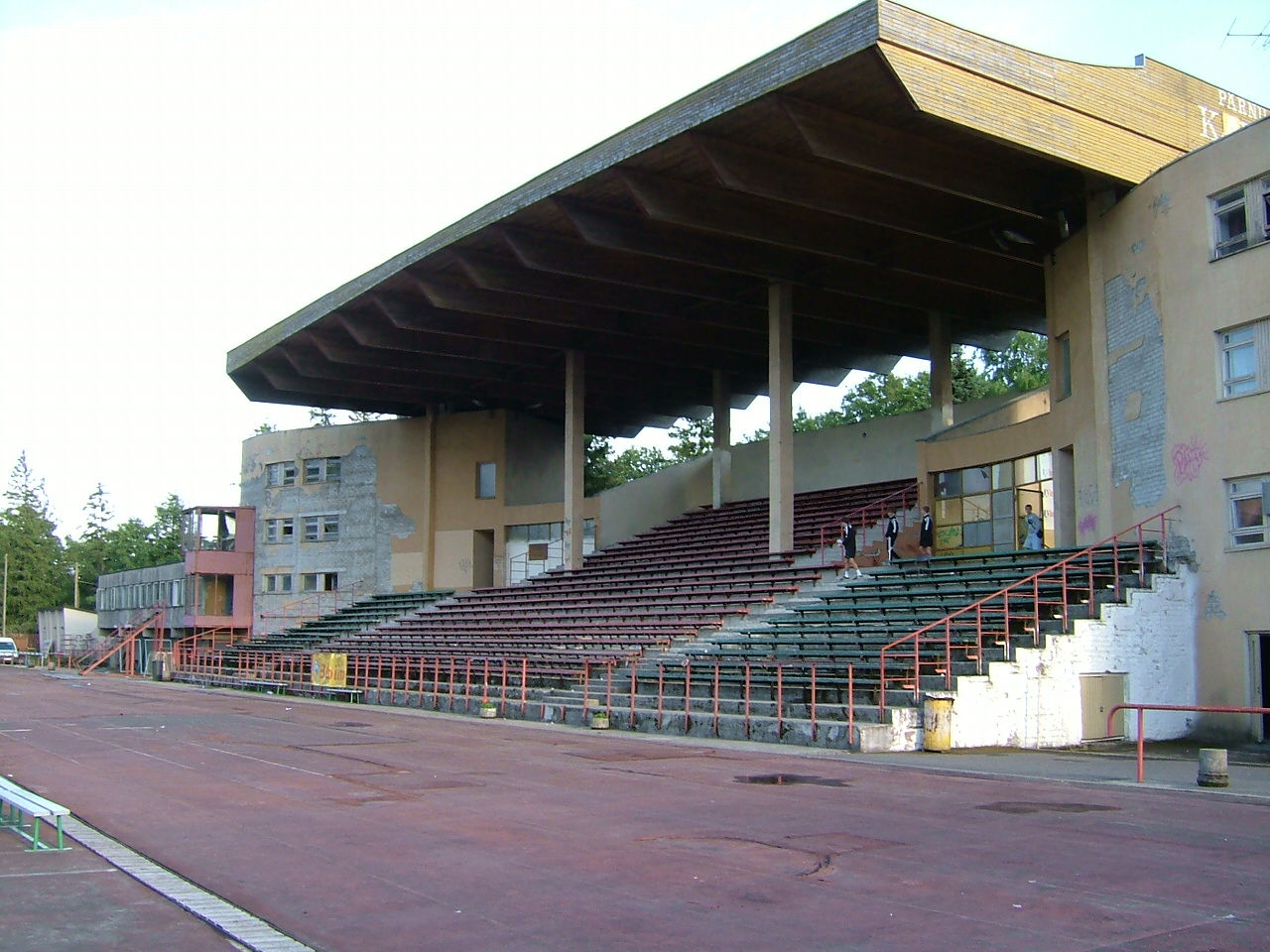
1987–2015

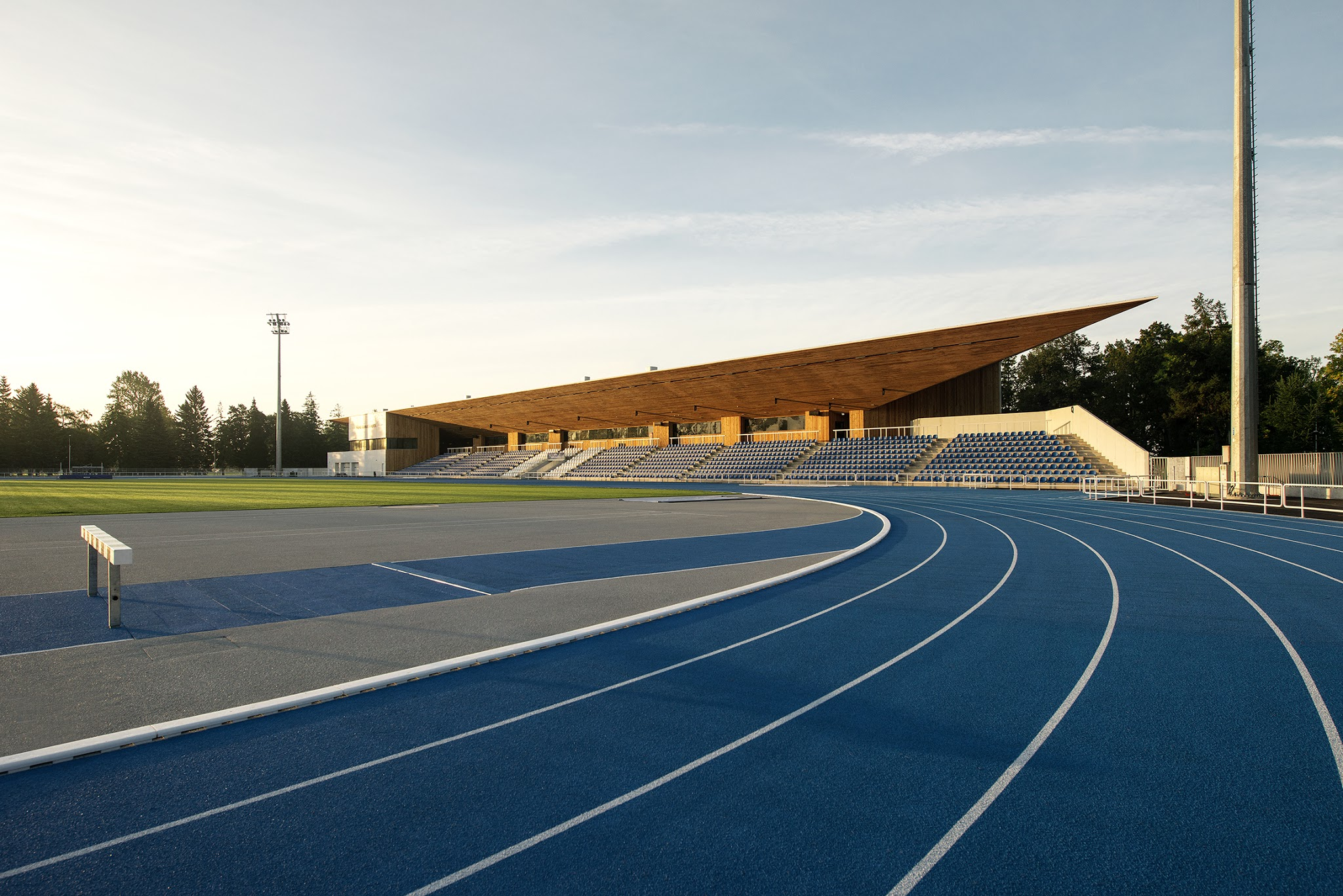
2016–present
The stadium after the 2015–2016 reconstruction

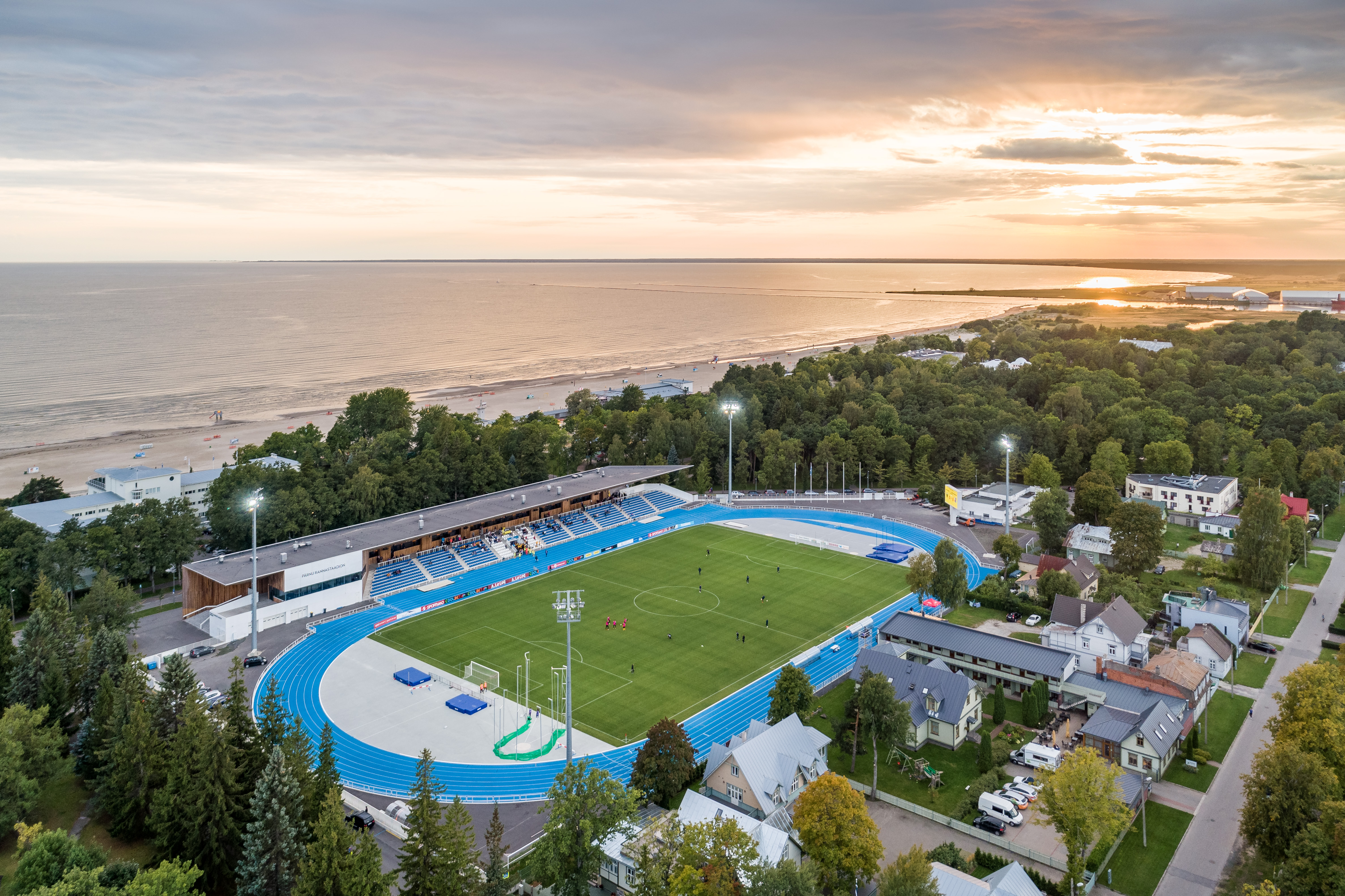

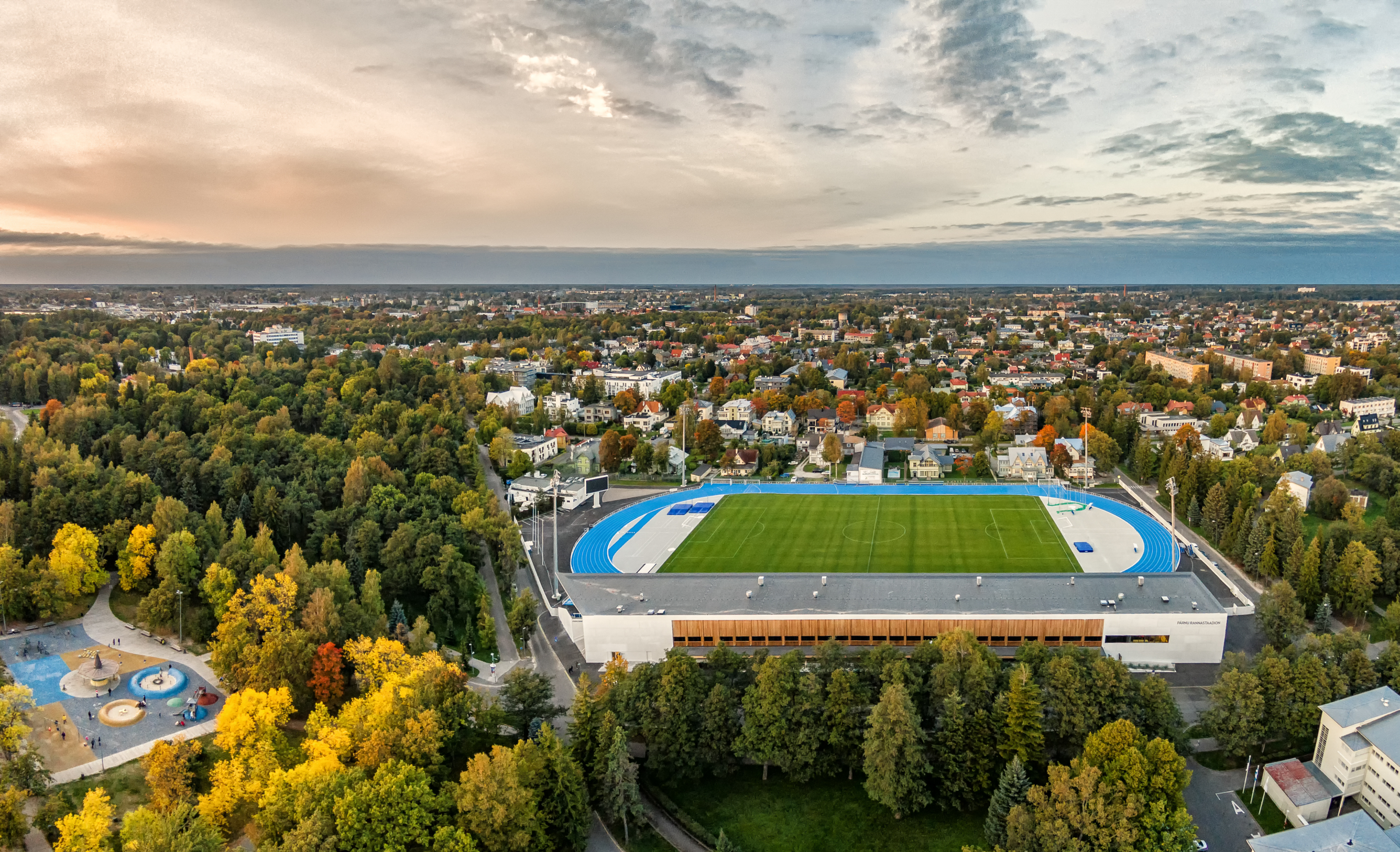

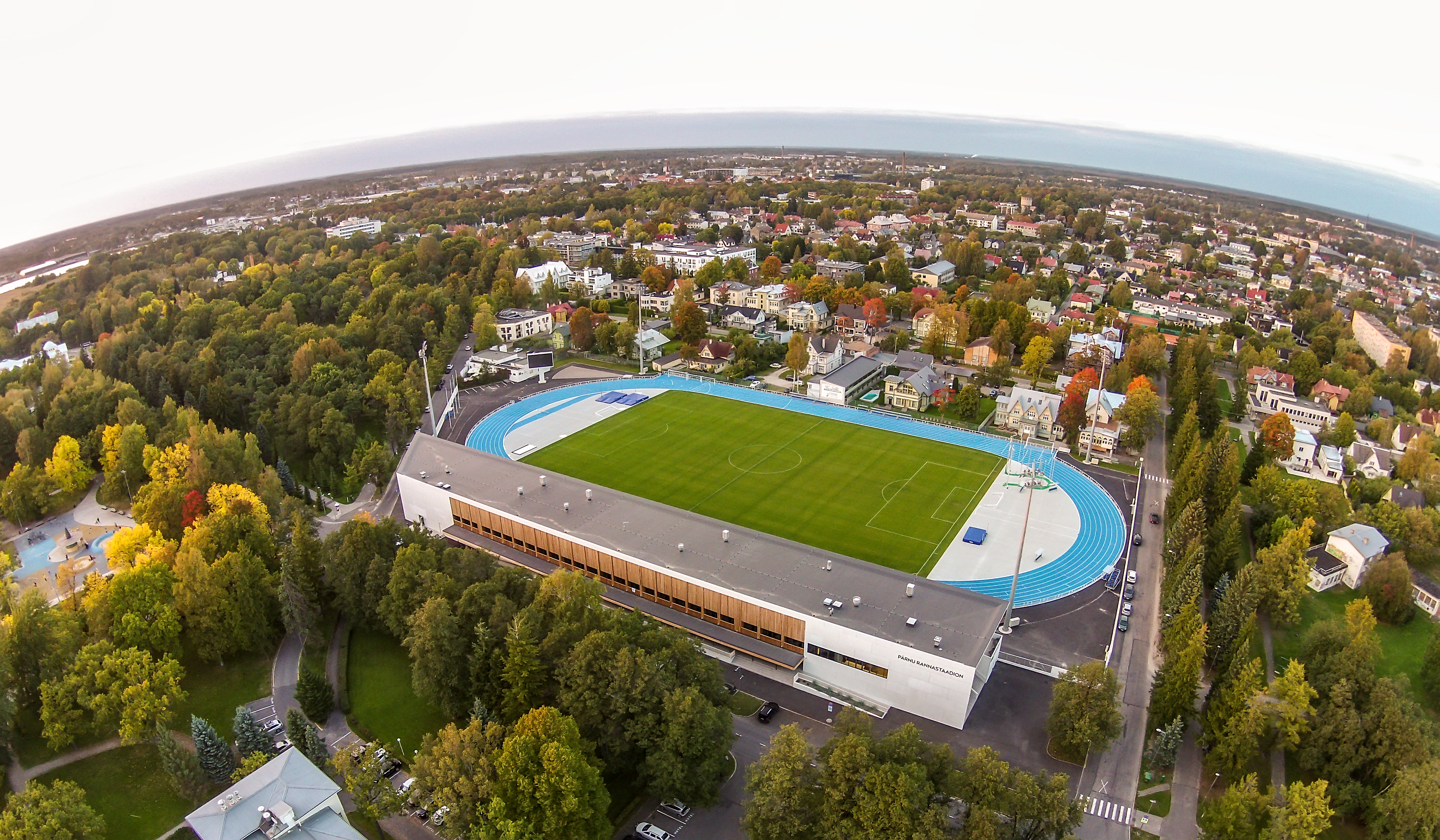

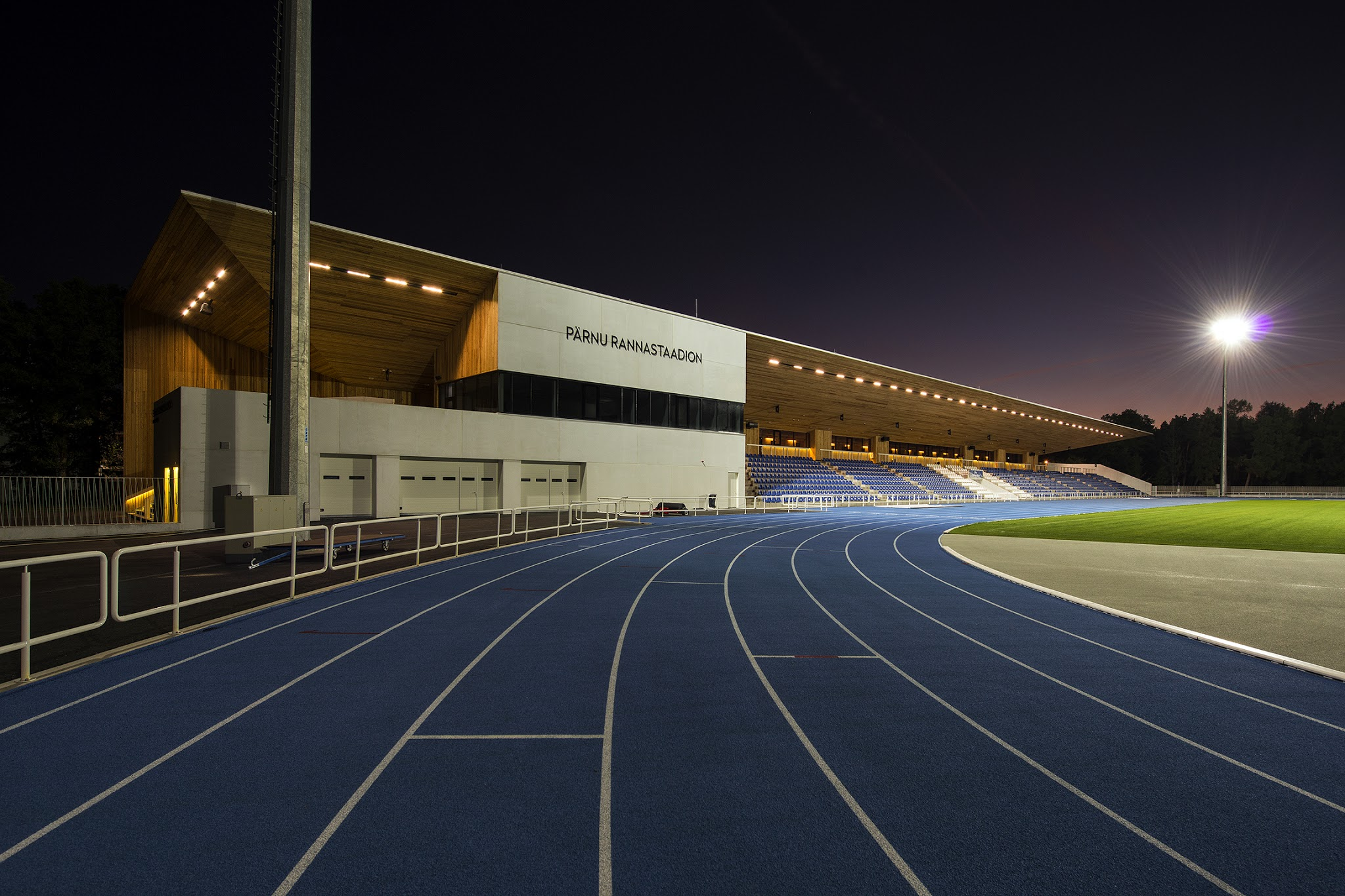

== Estonia national team matches ==
Pärnu has hosted five Estonia national football team matches.

Date		Result	Competition	Attendance
2 July 1993	Estonia – Latvia	0–2	1993 Baltic Cup	300
4 July 1993	Estonia – Lithuania	2–1	1993 Baltic Cup	800
18 August 1999	Estonia – Armenia	2–0	Friendly	1,000
31 August 2016	Estonia – Malta	1–1	Friendly	2,515
6 June 2026	Estonia – Faroe Islands	1–0	2026 Baltic Cup	1,543

== Athletics records ==
Updated on 6 June 2021.

=== Men ===
Event	Record	Athlete	Nationality	Date	Ref
100 m	10.40	Oleksandr Sokolov	Ukraine	19.08.2018	
200 m	21.02	Igor Bodrov	Ukraine	27.08.2016	
300 m	33.02	Rasmus Mägi	Estonia	03.07.2022	
400 m	46.61	Aivar Ojastu	Estonia	01.09.1989	
800 m	1:48.8	Rein Tölp	Estonia	1965	
800 m	1:48.82	Anatoli Millin	Russia	13.07.1988	
1000 m	2:19.02	Sergey Afanasyev	Russia	13.07.1988	
1500 m	3:46.3	Mart Vilt	Estonia	1965	
Mile	4:06.50	Juri Sinkovski	Latvia	13.07.1988	
2000 m	5:33.6	Lembit Kupp	Estonia	01.09.1971	
3000 m	8:10.8	Arvi Uba	Estonia	28.08.1987	
5000 m	14:09.0	Mart Vilt	Estonia	1965	
10,000 m	29:58.4	Ants Nurmekivi	Estonia	1971	
110 m hurdles	13.83	Keiso Pedriks	Estonia	22.08.2020	
400 m hurdles	49.97	Maksims Sincukovs	Latvia	22.08.2020	
3000 m steeplechase	8:43.39	Aivar Tsarski	Estonia	07.1989	
High jump	2.25	Normunds Sietiņš	Latvia	27.06.1992	
High jump	2.25	Rolandas Verkys	Lithuania	27.06.1992	
Pole vault	5.70	Aleksandrs Obižajevs	Latvia	13.07.1988	
Pole vault	5.70	Vadim Kodentsev	Russia	13.07.1988	
Long jump	7.84	Serhiy Nykyforov	Ukraine	18.08.2017	
Triple jump	16.83	Redzinaldas Stasaitis	Lithuania	31.07.1993	
Shot put	20.76	Kristo Galeta	Estonia	21.07.2019	
Discus throw	64.78	Andrius Gudžius	Lithuania	27.08.2016	
Hammer throw	82.16	Vitaliy Alisevich	Belarus	13.07.1988	
Javelin throw	85.61	Magnus Kirt	Estonia	24.08.2019	
Decathlon	7966	Indrek Kaseorg	Estonia	30.05.1993	
4 × 100 m relay	39.97	Latvia	Latvia	03.07.2022	
4 × 400 m relay	3:12.53	Latvia	Latvia	31.07.1993	

=== Women ===
Event	Record	Athlete	Nationality	Date	Ref
100 m	11.61	Viktoriya Ratnikova	Ukraine	03.07.2022	
200 m	23.96	Kristin Saua	Estonia	06.06.2021	
300 m	36.87	Gunta Vaičule	Latvia	03.07.2022	
400 m	51.88	Vineta Ikauniece	Latvia	13.07.1988	
800 m	1:56.82	Lyudmila Rogachova	Russia	13.07.1988	
1000 m	2:40.81	Sara Kuivisto	Finland	19.08.2018	
1500 m	4:12.99	Stefanija Statkuvienė	Lithuania	30.07.1993	
Mile	4:42.54	Liina Tšernov	Estonia	27.08.2016	
3000 m	8:56.31	Natalya Artyomova	Russia	13.07.1988	
100 m hurdles	13.02	Ludmila Olijara	Latvia	23.09.1989	
400 m hurdles	55.95	Margareta Jasevicene	Lithuania	28.06.1992	
High jump	1.92	Bianca Salming	Sweden	16.06.2018	
Pole vault	4.15	Marleen Mülla	Estonia	06.06.2021	
Long jump	6.77	Larysa Berezhna	Ukraine	13.07.1988	
Triple jump	13.45	Merilyn Uudmäe	Estonia	21.07.2019	
Shot put	19.17	Danguolé Urbikiené	Lithuania	27.06.1992	
Discus throw	63.62	Ilga Smeikste	Latvia	13.07.1988	
Hammer throw	69.86	Sofiya Palkina	Russia	19.08.2018	
Javelin throw	61.83	Liina Laasma	Estonia	27.08.2016	
Heptathlon	6011	Mari Klaup	Estonia	17.06.2018	
10 km walk	45:33	Sada Bukšnienė	Lithuania	28.06.1992	
4 × 100 m relay	45.96	TÜ ASK	Estonia	06.06.2021	
4 × 400 m relay	3:41.54	Lithuania	Lithuania	31.07.1993	
