= List of hotels in Estonia =

This is the list of hotels located in Estonia. The list is incomplete.

Name	Location (city/town, county)	Further info	Image
Ammende Villa	Pärnu, Pärnu County		
Aqva Hotel & Spa	Rakvere, Lääne-Viru County	Opened in 2008	
Barclay Hotel	Tartu, Tartu County	Opened in 1996	
Ekesparre House	Kuressaare, Saare County		
Meriton Grand Hotel Tallinn	Tallinn, Harju County		
Pärnu Mud Baths	Pärnu, Pärnu County		
Radisson Blu Hotel Olümpia	Tallinn, Harju County		
Rannahotell Pärnu	Pärnu, Pärnu County		
Schlössle Hotel	Tallinn, Harju County		
Sokos Hotel Viru	Tallinn, Harju County		
Swissôtel Tallinn	Tallinn, Harju County		
Tervise Paradiis	Pärnu, Pärnu County		
