= Athletics at the 2001 Summer Universiade – Men's high jump =

The men's high jump event at the 2001 Summer Universiade was held at the Workers Stadium in Beijing, China on 27–29 August.

== Medalists ==
Gold	Silver	Bronze
Aleksandr Kravtsov; Russia	Hennazdy Maroz; Belarus	Tora Harris; United States

== Results ==
=== Qualification ===
Rank	Group	Athlete	Nationality	Result	Notes
1	A	Shaun Guice	United States	2.20	
2	A	Grzegorz Sposób	Poland	2.20	
3	A	Wang Zhouzhou	China	2.20	
4	A	Ştefan Vasilache	Romania	2.15	
5	A	Marko Aleksejev	Estonia	2.15	
6	A	Felipe Apablaza	Chile	2.15	
6	A	Aleksey Krysin	Russia	2.15	
6	A	Aleksey Lesnichiy	Belarus	2.15	
6	A	Svatoslav Ton	Czech Republic	2.15	
10	A	Jeff Caton	Canada	2.10	
1	B	Aleksandr Kravtsov	Russia	2.20	
1	B	David Antona	Spain	2.20	
1	B	Hennazdy Maroz	Belarus	2.20	
1	B	Jessé de Lima	Brazil	2.20	
5	B	Tomáš Ort	Czech Republic	2.20	
6	B	Liang Tong	China	2.15	
7	B	Tora Harris	United States	2.15	
8	B	Angel Kararadev	Bulgaria	2.15	
9	B	Mohamed Bradai	Algeria	2.10	
10	B	Jesse Lipscombe	Canada	2.10	

=== Final ===
Rank	Athlete	Nationality	Result	Notes
1st place, gold medalist(s)	Aleksandr Kravtsov	Russia	2.28	
2nd place, silver medalist(s)	Hennazdy Maroz	Belarus	2.28	
3rd place, bronze medalist(s)	Tora Harris	United States	2.26	
4	Grzegorz Sposób	Poland	2.26	
5	Wang Zhouzhou	China	2.26	
6	Marko Aleksejev	Estonia	2.20	
7	Svatoslav Ton	Czech Republic	2.20	
8	Shaun Guice	United States	2.20	
8	Aleksey Lesnichiy	Belarus	2.20	
10	Jessé de Lima	Brazil	2.20	
11	Felipe Apablaza	Chile	2.15	
11	Liang Tong	China	2.15	
11	Ştefan Vasilache	Romania	2.15	
14	Tomáš Ort	Czech Republic	2.15	
15	David Antona	Spain	2.10	
	Aleksey Krysin	Russia	NM	
