= Korzun =

Korzun is a surname. Notable people with the surname include:

- Aleksandr Korzun (born 2000), Belarusian footballer
- Dina Korzun (born 1971), Russian actress
- Nikita Korzun (born 1995), Belarusian footballer
- Valery Korzun (born 1953), Russian cosmonaut
