= Rannahotell Pärnu =

Hotel in Pärnu, Estonia

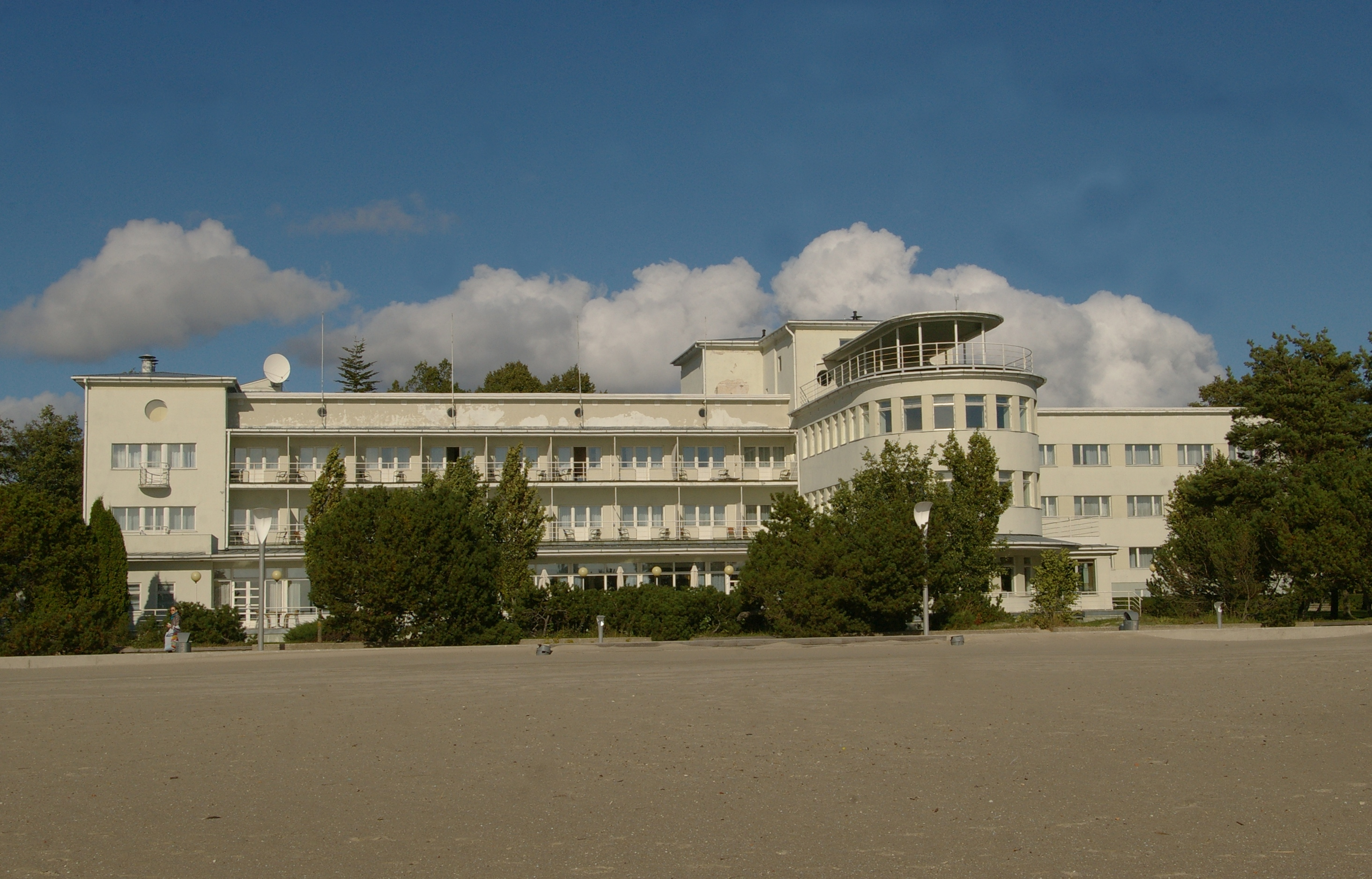
- Rannahotell Pärnu
- Interactive map of the Rannahotell Pärnu area

General information
- Location: Pärnu, Estonia, Ranna puiestee 5, Pärnu, 80010 Pärnu maakond, Estonia
- Opening: 1937

Design and construction
- Architect: Olev Siinmaa

Other information
- Parking: Yes

Website
- www.rannahotell.ee

Rannahotell Pärnu (Estonian: Pärnu rannahotell) is a hotel in Pärnu, Estonia. The hotel is next to Pärnu Beach and Pärnu Bay.

The hotel was built in 1937. The hotel was designed by Olev Siinmaa. Architecturally, the building is characterized by Scandinavian style.
