= Aleksandr Kravtsov =

Russian high jumper

Personal information
- Born: March 18, 1974 (age 52)

Sport
- Sport: Track and field
Medal record
Representing Russia
Summer Universiade
Gold medal – first place	2001 Beijing	High jump

Aleksandr Kravtsov (born March 18, 1974) is a retired male high jumper from Russia, best known for winning the gold medal in the men's high jump at the 2001 Summer Universiade. He set his personal best (2.31 metres) on 14 July 2001 at a meet in Tula.

== Achievements ==
Year	Competition	Venue	Position	Notes
Representing Russia
2001	World Championships	Edmonton, Canada	17th (q)	2.20 m
2001	Universiade	Beijing, PR China	1st	2.28 m
