= Pärnu Beach =

Beach in Pärnu, Estonia

Coordinates: 58°22′27″N 24°29′43″E

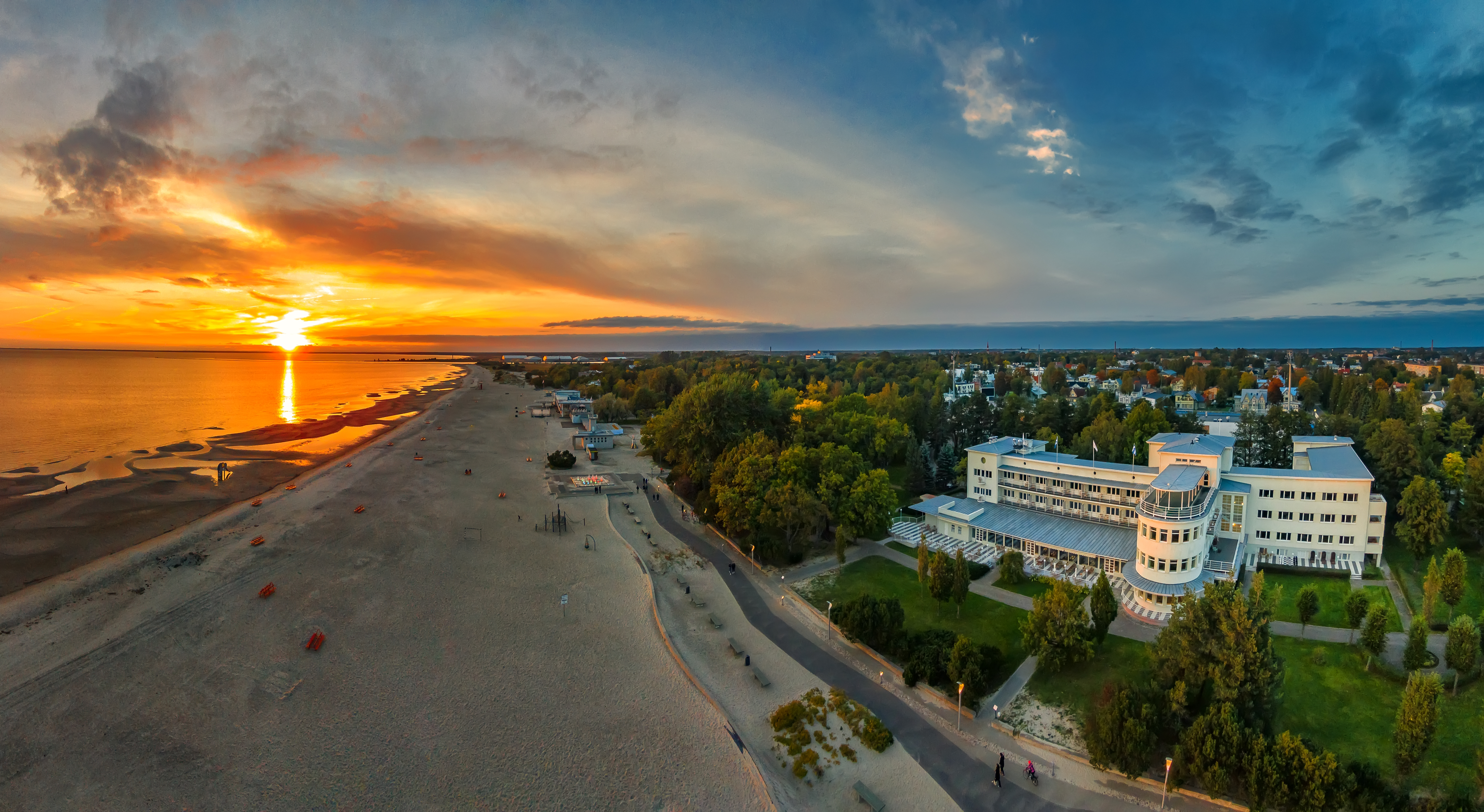
Sunset in Pärnu beach in September

Pärnu beach and town

Pärnu Beach (Estonian: Pärnu rand) is a beach of Pärnu Bay, administratively in Pärnu, Estonia. In a sunny summer day, tens of thousand sunbathers and swimmers visit the beach.

The beach area includes swings, surfing equipment rental and a mini golf area. A number of hotels are located by the beach, such as Pärnu Rannahotell, Pärnu Mud Baths and Tervise Paradiis. The beach promenade was renovated in 2021.

Set in 2010, the record water temperature at Pärnu Beach is 33 °C.

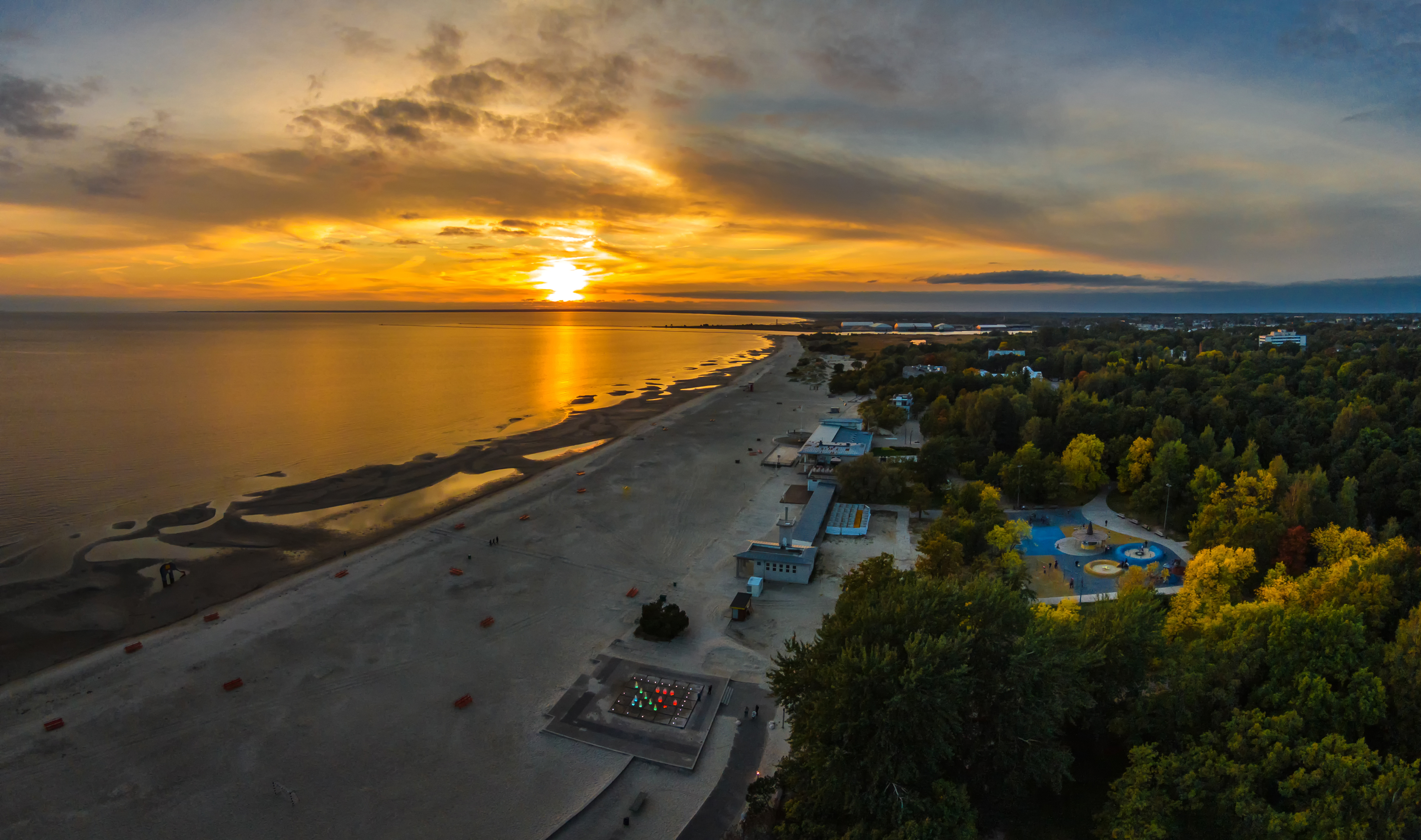
Sunset in Pärnu beach

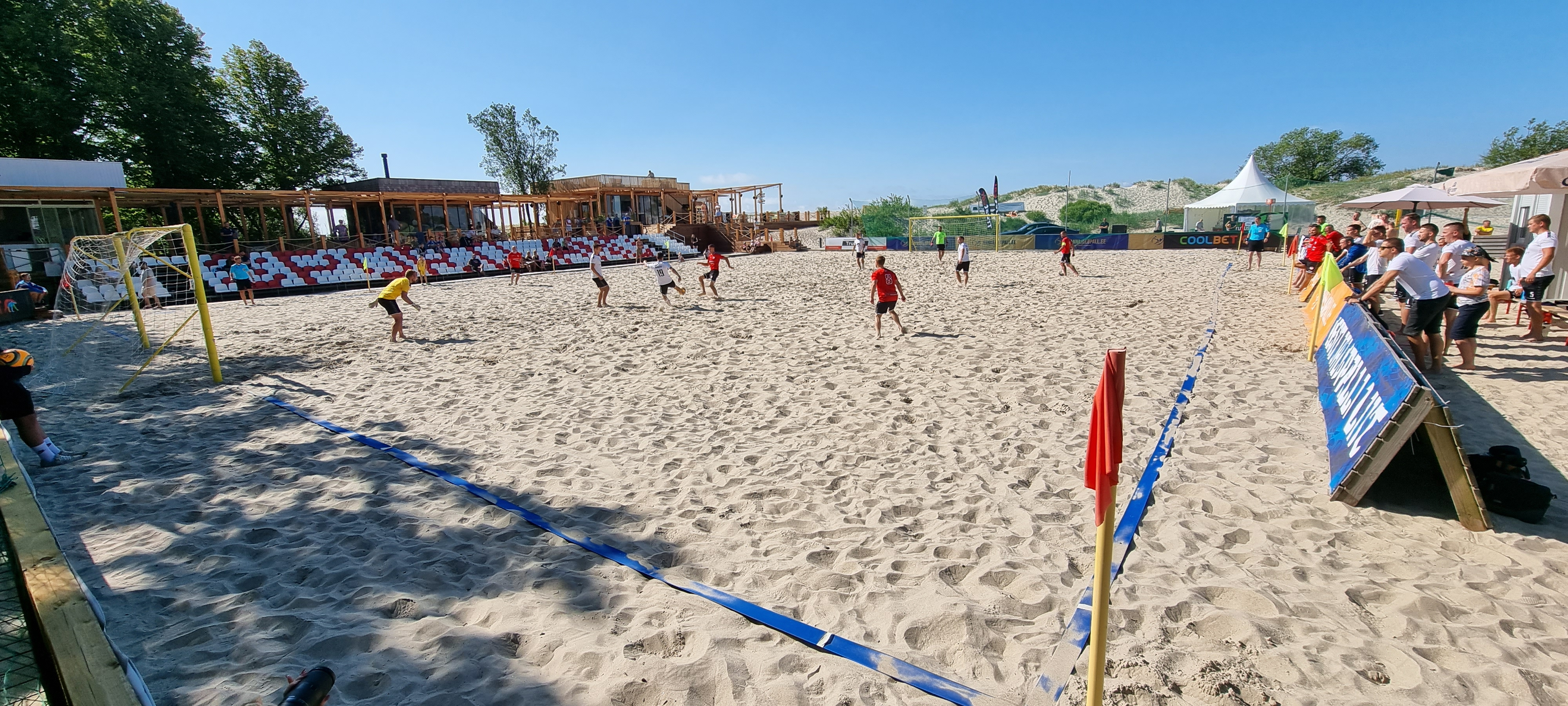
Beach football arena at the Pärnu beach

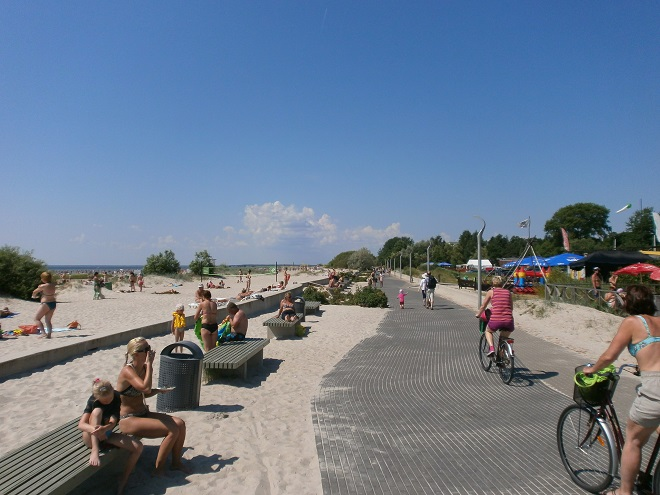
Pärnu beach promenade
