= 1986 World Junior Championships in Athletics – Men's hammer throw =

The men's hammer throw event at the 1986 World Junior Championships in Athletics was held in Athens, Greece, at Olympic Stadium on 18 and 19 July. A 7257g (senior implement) hammer was used.

== Medalists ==
Gold	Vitaliy Alisevich; Soviet Union
Silver	Valeriy Gubkin; Soviet Union
Bronze	Sabin Khristov; Bulgaria

== Results ==
=== Final ===
19 July

Rank	Name	Nationality	Result	Notes
1st place, gold medalist(s)	Vitaliy Alisevich	Soviet Union	72.00	
2nd place, silver medalist(s)	Valeriy Gubkin	Soviet Union	71.78	
3rd place, bronze medalist(s)	Sabin Khristov	Bulgaria	68.96	
4	Raphaël Piolanti	France	68.26	
5	Björn-Peter Fuhrmann	East Germany	68.06	
6	René Fox	West Germany	67.26	
7	Sean Carlin	Australia	66.48	
8	Jörn Hübner	East Germany	66.10	
9	Frédéric Kuhn	France	62.00	
10	Nicola Sundas	Italy	61.34	
11	Liviu Gabriel Ion	Romania	58.58	
12	Milan Malát	Czechoslovakia	57.36	

=== Qualifications ===
18 Jul

==== Group A ====
Rank	Name	Nationality	Result	Notes
1	Sean Carlin	Australia	67.66	Q
2	Björn-Peter Fuhrmann	East Germany	67.12	Q
3	Valeriy Gubkin	Soviet Union	66.36	Q
4	Vitaliy Alisevich	Soviet Union	66.10	Q
5	Raphaël Piolanti	France	65.52	Q
6	Sabin Khristov	Bulgaria	63.70	Q
7	Jörn Hübner	East Germany	63.48	Q
8	Frédéric Kuhn	France	61.54	Q
9	René Fox	West Germany	61.26	Q
10	Milan Malát	Czechoslovakia	60.98	Q
11	Liviu Gabriel Ion	Romania	60.74	Q
12	Nicola Sundas	Italy	59.38	q
13	Otto Kohout	Czechoslovakia	59.06	
14	Nobuhiro Todoroki	Japan	58.30	
15	Rene Díaz	Cuba	58.24	
16	Peter Baxevanis	Australia	57.34	
17	Hannes Pinter	Austria	57.28	
18	Ioánnis Deligiánnis	Greece	56.26	
19	Aryírios Klapanaras	Greece	55.60	
20	Adrián Marzo	Argentina	55.52	
21	Victor Solé	Spain	55.42	
22	Mika Hansson	Finland	54.68	
23	Paul Rao	United States	51.88	
24	Nicos Anastasiades	Cyprus	49.08	
25	Rashid Riyadh	Bahrain	48.40	
26	Daniel Ford	United States	47.40	
27	Evan Brown	Canada	46.52	
	Eldon Pfeiffer	Canada	NM	

== Participation ==
According to an unofficial count, 28 athletes from 20 countries participated in the event.

- Argentina (1)
- Australia (2)
- Austria (1)
- Bahrain (1)
- Bulgaria (1)
- Canada (2)
- Cuba (1)
- Cyprus (1)
- Czechoslovakia (2)
- East Germany (2)
- Finland (1)
- France (2)
- Greece (2)
- Italy (1)
- Japan (1)
- Romania (1)
- Soviet Union (2)
- Spain (1)
- United States (2)
- West Germany (1)
