= Tatyana Kurochkina =

Belarusian athlete

Personal information
- Nationality: Belarusian
- Born: 15 September 1967 (age 59) Hrodna, Byelorussian SSR, USSR

Sport
- Sport: Track and field
- Event: 400 metres hurdles

Tatyana Kurochkina (née Matsuta, born 15 September 1967) is a Belarusian former 400m hurdler. She represented the Soviet Union at the 1988 Seoul Olympics, where she finished seventh in the final in a lifetime best of 54.39 secs. She went on to represent Belarus at the 1996 Atlanta Olympics.

== International competitions ==
Year	Competition	Venue	Position	Notes
Representing Soviet Union
1985	European Junior Championships	Cottbus, Germany	4th	57.92
1988	Olympic Games	Seoul, South Korea	7th	54.39
Representing Belarus
1993	World Championships	Stuttgart, Germany	14th (sf)	55.64
1994	European Cup	Birmingham, United Kingdom	3rd	56.02
1994	European Championships	Helsinki, Finland	5th	55.18
1995	European Cup	Villeneuve d'Ascq, France	2nd	55.59
1995	World Championships	Gothenburg, Sweden	heats	DQ
1996	Olympic Games	Atlanta, United States	27th (h)	57.28
1997	European Cup	Munich, Germany	4th	56.19
1998	European Championships	Budapest, Hungary	15th (h)	57.05
2001	European Cup	Bremen, Germany	5th	56.17
(#) Indicates overall position in qualifying heats (h) or semifinals (sf) DQ = disqualified
