= Mikhail Kostin (shot putter) =

Mikhail Kostin (born 10 May 1959) is a Belarusian male former track and field athlete who competed in the shot put, mainly for the Soviet Union. He won the inaugural shot put title at the Belarusian national championships in 1992. He made one international appearance for his native country, winning the 1993 European Cup title in the Second League.

While he never competed at a major international event, he achieved distances that ranked him very highly. He threw beyond twenty metres every season he competed in from 1984 to 1994. His best 21.96 m (72 ft 1/2 in), achieved in 1986 ranked him seventh in the world for that season and, reflecting the high standards of the time, he continues to rank in the all-time top 30 shot putters. He ranked among the top ten shot putters in the world for the 1988 and 1989 seasons. In indoor competition, he set a best of 21.39 m (70 ft 2 in) in Minsk in January 1988, which makes him the third best Soviet thrower indoors after Sergey Kasnauskas and Sergey Smirnov. It made him the third best athlete of the 1988 indoor season, after Randy Barnes and Remigius Machura.

== International competitions ==
Year	Competition	Venue	Position	Event	Notes
1993	European Cup 2nd League	Rotterdam, Netherlands	1st	Shot put	18.97
