= Alena Mazouka =

Belarusian long-distance runner

Alena Mazouka (Belarusian: Алена Мазоўка, also Russian: Елена Мазовка - Yelena Mazovka; born June 30, 1967) is a retired female long-distance runner from Belarus, who represented her native country at the 1996 Summer Olympics in the women's marathon race. There she finished in 24th place in the overall-rankings. Mazovka set her personal best (2:29:06) in the classic distance in 1997.

== Achievements ==
Year	Competition	Venue	Position	Event	Notes
Representing Belarus
1996	Olympic Games	Atlanta, United States	24th	Marathon	2:36:22
1996	Venice Marathon	Venice, Italy	1st	Marathon	2:31:07
1997	World Championships	Athens, Greece	—	Marathon	DNF
1998	European Championships	Budapest, Hungary	27th	Marathon	2:38:01
2003	Košice Peace Marathon	Košice, Slovakia	1st	Marathon	2:39:23
