= Andrey Talashko =

Belarusian racewalker

Personal information
- Full name: Andrey Mikhaylovich Talashko
- Nationality: Belarusian
- Born: 31 May 1982 (age 44)

Sport
- Sport: Athletics
- Event: Racewalking

Andrey Mikhaylovich Talashko (born 31 May 1982) is a Belarusian racewalker. He competed in the men's 20 kilometres walk at the 2004 Summer Olympics.
