= Pärnu Mud Baths =

Hotel in Pärnu, Estonia

Coordinates: 58.3758°N 24.4962°E

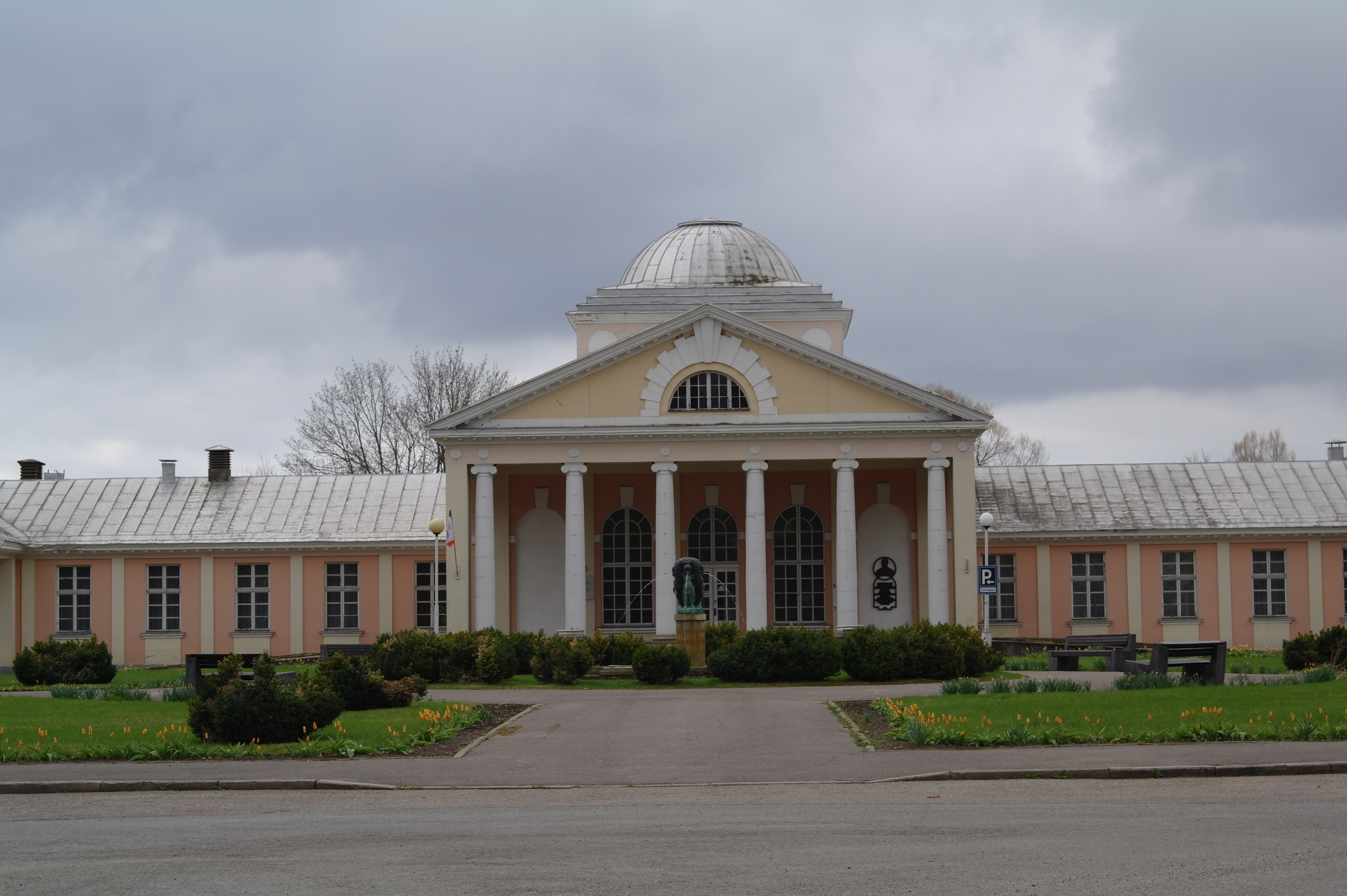
Pärnu Mud Baths

Pärnu Mud Baths (Estonian: Pärnu mudaravila) is a hotel in Pärnu, Estonia. The hotel is notable for its mud bath therapy services.

The neoclassicist building was constructed in 1926–1927. The building was designed by Olev Siinmaa, Erich von Wolffeldt and Aleksander Nürnberg. At the same place, the bathing house (established in 1838) was located. The bathing house burned down in World War I.

During the Soviet era, the hotel was popular health facility for the working people. Since the 1990s, the hotel was not in use. In 2014, the boutique spa was opened.
