= Leonid Vershinin =

Belarusian hurdler

Personal information
- Nationality: Belarusian
- Born: 23 June 1977 (age 49) Grodno, Soviet Union

Sport
- Sport: Track and field
- Event: 400 metres hurdles

Leonid Vershinin (born 23 June 1977) is a Belarusian hurdler. He competed in the men's 400 metres hurdles at the 2000 Summer Olympics.
