= Schlössle Hotel =

Hotel in Tallinn, Estonia

Coordinates: 59°26′18.94″N 24°44′50.88″E

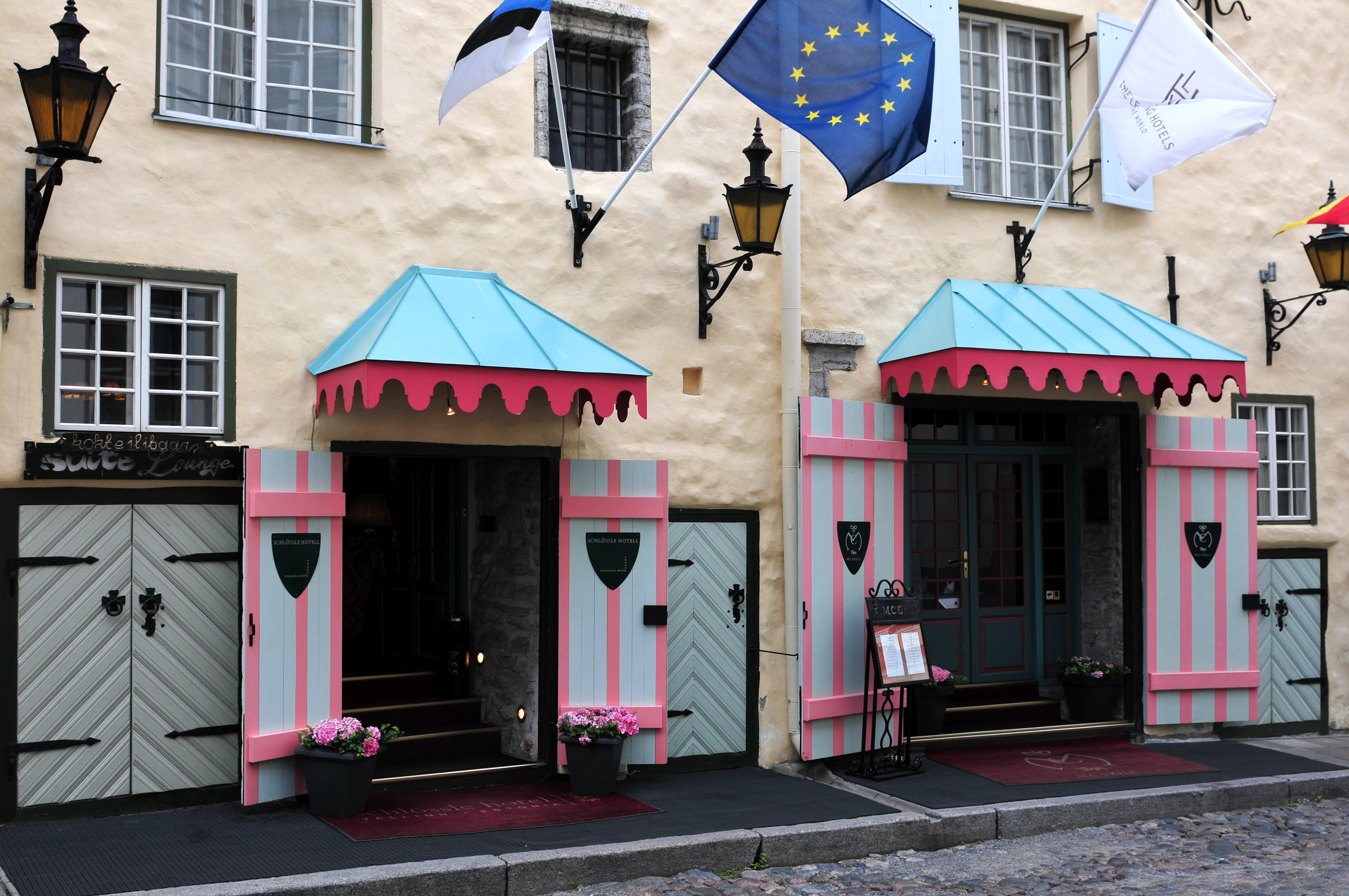
Entrance to Schlössle Hotel

Schlössle Hotel is a hotel in Tallinn, Estonia. Now a five-star establishment, its history goes back to the 14th century when there were warehouses on the site. The two houses forming today's structure were built in the mid-18th century.

== Location and description ==
Schlössle Hotel is located on Pühavaimu street in the Old Town of Tallinn. It lies adjacent to Tallinn City Museum and diagonally opposite from the Church of the Holy Ghost. The hotel is a 5-star boutique hotel and is the only member of The Leading Hotels of the World consortium in Estonia. It belongs to the Marbella Club Hotels group. The hotel has 23 rooms, meeting facilities, a restaurant, a cigar lounge and a traditional Estonian sauna. The hotel was named Estonia's Leading Hotel in 2011.

== History ==
The location of the present hotel was mentioned in written sources for the first time in 1363, when an adjacent building (today the City Museum) was referred to as a merchant's home. On the site of the hotel there were at that time already large stone warehouses, owned by a city alderman. The buildings were sold to the mayor Marquart Bretholt in 1470 (he had earlier acquired the premises of today's City Museum). At the time, only one entrance to the courtyard behind the warehouses existed, an entrance which has been preserved to this day. The buildings subsequently belonged to several distinguished Tallinn families, such as Viant, van Husen, Blanckenhagen, Hetling, Intelmann and Schlovin. Following the capitulation of Estonia during the Great Northern War and a subsequent outbreak of plague, the buildings were abandoned sometime around 1710. In 1739 the two warehouses were purchased by a merchant named Wilhelm Brinck. In 1758 he initiated a reconstruction of the buildings, whereby they were transformed from Gothic warehouses into residential houses, with several Baroque elements. The two houses that make up the present hotel still retain both medieval and Baroque features. One of the buildings is a registered national monument of Estonia.
