= Natalya Vasko =

Ukrainian actress

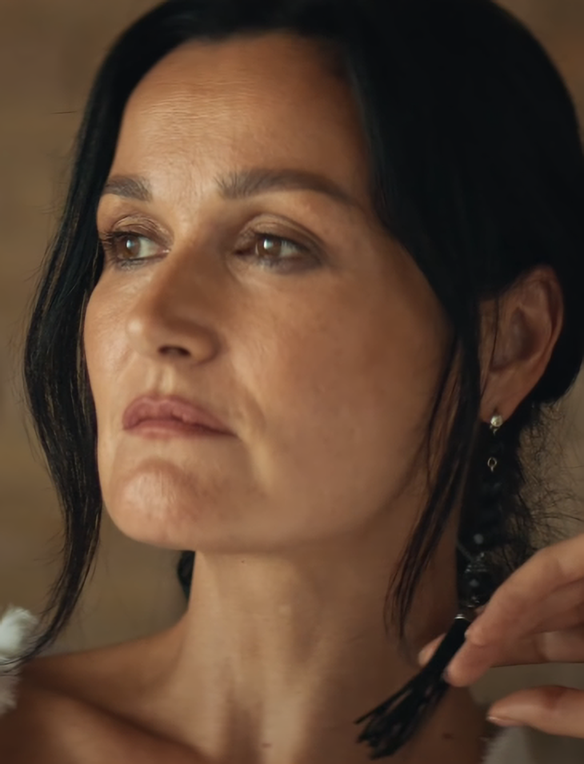
- Vasko in 2019.
- Born: Natalya Lubomyrivna Vasko; 19 October 1972 (age 52); Chervonohrad, Ukrainian SSR, Soviet Union
- Citizenship: Ukraine
- Occupation: Actress
- Spouse: Andriy Shestov (m. 2022)
- Children: 1

Natalya Lubomyrivna Vasko (Note: Ukrainian: Наталія Любомирівна Васько) (born 19 October 1972) is a Ukrainian actress and television presenter. From 1999 to 2019, she was a leading actress of the Kyiv National Academic Molodyy Theatre. She won the Golden Dzyga award in the "Best Supporting Actress" category in the film The Nest of the Turtledove (2017). She is also a member of the Ukrainian Film Academy.

== Biography ==
Vasko was born on 19 October 1972 in Chervonohrad, Lviv Oblast. In her youth, she was engaged in the theater of children's creativity "Fairytale", where she played a wide range of roles, from princesses to monsters. After school, on the second attempt, she entered the Kyiv National I. K. Karpenko-Kary Theatre, Cinema and Television University in which she graduated in 1994. From the 4th grade, she played in the Kyiv Academic Theater of Drama and Comedy. From 1999 to 2019, she was a leading actress of the Kyiv National Academic Molodyy Theatre.

In 2008, Vasko hosted the show "Morning with Inter" on the Ukrainian TV channel Inter.

== Personal life ==
From her first marriage, Vasko has a daughter, Yulia (b. 1997). On 28 February 2022, during the Russian invasion of Ukraine, Vasko married Andriy Shestov, with whom she had been together for the past eight years.
