= Liang Tong =

Chinese American biochemist

- Citizenship: United States of America
- Education: Peking University BS in chemistry (1983), University of California, Berkeley PhD (1989)
- Scientific career
- Fields: Biology
- Workplaces: Columbia University
- Doctoral advisor: Kim Sung-Hou
- Website: http://tonglab.biology.columbia.edu/

Liang Tong (Chinese: 童亮; pinyin: Tong Liang) is a Chinese American biochemist, structural biologist, and the current chair of the Biological Sciences Department at Columbia University.

== Early life and education ==
Tong, Liang was born on October 29, 1963, in Dalian, China. Liang studied at Peking University, Beijing, from 1979 to 1983, and earned his bachelor's degree in chemistry, working in Dr. You-Qi Tang's lab. During his four years at Peking University, he became interested in multiple fields of studies, such as computer science, mathematics, chemistry and biology. It was during the same time that he developed an interest in structural biology, which enabled him to combine his diverse interests to create knowledge. He obtained his PhD (biophysical chemistry with focus on protein crystallography) in the United States at University of California Berkeley in 1989, and his mentor at UCB was Dr. Sung-Hou Kim. After earning his PhD, Liang worked as a post-doctoral research associate in Dr. Michael G. Rossmann's lab at Purdue University from 1989 to 1992. During his time at Purdue University, Liang joined the Sigma Xi for his achievement in research.

== Research and career ==
Liang started his career working in Boehringer Ingelheim Pharmaceuticals, Inc. in Ridgefield, Connecticut, working as a senior scientist from 1992 to 1995, and as a principal scientist from 1996 to 1997. In 1997, Liang was offered a faculty appointment at the department of biological sciences, Columbia University. Liang has been the department chair of the department of biological sciences since 2013, and he was recently named the William R. Kenan, Jr. Professor in 2015. Until July 2018, Liang has published 239 papers and 38 reviews/book chapters.

Robust research in the field of biochemistry and structural biology has been going on the Liang Tong lab, and Liang is a dedicated and productive protein crystallographer. He participated or lead the solving of the structures of proteins and protein complexes including, but not limited to, the heterotrimer core of the yeast Saccharomyces cerevisiae AMPK homologue SNF1, 5’-3’ exoribonuclease Rat1 and its activating partner Rai1, the a6b6 holoenzyme of propionyl-coenzyme A carboxylase, human symplekin-Ssu72-CTD phosphopeptide complex, histone mRNA stem-loop, human stem-loop binding protein and 3’hExo ternary complex, human phosphofructokinase-1, and the 500-kDa yeast acetyl-CoA carboxylase holoenzyme dimer using X-ray crystallography. In addition to structural studies, Liang also contributed to the understanding of the biological mechanisms and macro molecule interactions by combining a variety of biochemical and molecular biology approaches with structural analysis. In the study that characterized cyclic dinucleotide c-di-AMP as an allosteric regulator of metabolic enzyme function, chemical proteomics were used to define the c-di-AMP interactome of Listeria monocytogenes, enzyme kinetics study was used to show the inhibitory effect of c-di-AMP on LmPC, analysis of the structure of LmPC in complex with c-di-AMP further supported the interaction between LmPC and c-di-AMP, and experiments at the cellular level showed that metabolic balance mediated by c-di-AMP affected intracellular growth of L. monocytogenes by causing bacteriolysis within the host cytosol.

Current research in the Liang Tong's lab focuses on enzymes involved in fatty acid metabolism, including acetyl-CoA carboxylase, carnitine acyltransferase, AMP-activated protein kinase, and others. These enzymes are important targets for drug discovery against obesity, diabetes and other human diseases. The goal of his research is to produce structural information on these enzymes and to understand their functions at the molecular level. The structural information will also lay the foundation for drug discovery against these targets. Another area of his research is on proteins involved in pre-mRNA 3'-end processing. Most eukaryotic mRNA precursors must undergo cleavage and polyadenylation in their 3'-ends before they can function as mRNAs. This processing machinery contains more than 16 protein factors, which form several sub-complexes (CPSF, CSTF). The goal of his research is to understand the molecular basis of this important event.
