= Vitaliy Alisevich =

Belarusian hammer thrower

Personal information
- Nationality: Belarusian
- Born: 10 March 1967
- Died: 28 October 2012 (aged 45)

Sport
- Country: Soviet Union (1985–91); Belarus (1991–2003)
- Sport: Athletics
- Event: Hammer throw
- Retired: 2003

Achievements and titles
- National finals: 2 Belarusian titles
- Personal best: Hammer: 82.16 m (1988)

Vitaliy Alisevich (10 March 1967 – 28 October 2012) was a Belarusian hammer thrower. He competed at the 1986 World Junior Championships in Athletics for the Soviet Union, where he got a gold medal, and represented Belarus at the 1994 European Athletics Championships, taking ninth place. Alisevich also won a gold medal at the Baltic Sea Games in 1997 and a bronze medal at the 1995 Military World Games.

He was twice champion at the Belarusian Athletics Championships, winning in 1992 and 1994, as well as being runner-up at the CIS Winter Throwing Championships in 1992.

His personal best throw of 82.16 m in 1988 ranked him 11th on the all-time lists at that point. He was married to Belarusian heptathlete Tatyana Alisevich.

== International competitions ==
Year	Competition	Venue	Position	Event	Result	Notes
1986	World Junior Championships	Athens, Greece	1st	Hammer throw	72.00 m	
1994	European Cup 1st League	Valencia, Spain	1st	Hammer throw	77.58 m	
1994	European Championships	Helsinki, Finland	9th	Hammer throw	74.44 m	
1995	Military World Games	Rome, Italy	3rd	Hammer throw	74.58 m	
1996	European Cup 1st League Group 2	Bergen, Norway	3rd	Hammer throw	72.62 m	
1997	Baltic Sea Games	Vilnius, Lithuania	1st	Hammer throw	71.72 m	
1999	Military World Games	Zagreb, Croatia	10th	Hammer throw	70.34 m	

== National titles ==
- Belarusian Athletics Championships
  - Hammer throw: 1992, 1994

== See also ==
- List of Belarusian Athletics Championships winners
