= Aleksey Lesnichiy =

Belarusian high jumper

Personal information
- Full name: Aleksey Lesnichiy
- Nationality: Belarus
- Born: 3 February 1978 (age 48) Navapolatsk, Belarusian; SSR, Soviet Union
- Height: 1.98 m (6 ft 6 in)
- Weight: 77 kg (170 lb)

Sport
- Sport: Athletics
- Event: High jump
- Club: Dynamo Navapolatsk
- Coached by: Uladzimir Ruskih

Achievements and titles
- Personal best: High jump: 2.30 (2003)

Aleksey Lesnichiy (also Aliaksei Liasnichy, Belarusian: Аляксей Ляснічы; born 3 February 1978) is a retired Belarusian high jumper. Lesnichiy was selected to compete for the Belarusian squad in the men's high jump at the 2004 Summer Olympics, but his participation had been abruptly outweighed with a doping failure for testing positive on clenbuterol, which resulted to his impending expulsion from the Games. During his athletic career, Lesnichiy cleared a height at 2.30 m to establish his own personal best from the 2003 Belarusian Athletics Meet in Minsk.

Lesnichiy qualified for the Belarusian squad in the men's high jump at the 2004 Summer Olympics in Athens, by passing the exact Olympic A-height and registering his own personal best of 2.30 m from the national athletics meet in Minsk. Lesnichiy crashed out of the qualifying round without attaining a mark against his name after failing to clear a height of 2.10 m in all three attempts. On August 24, 2004, four days after his high jump competition, Lesnichiy tested positive for the banned anabolic steroid clenbuterol, and was formally expelled from the Games by the International Olympic Committee.
