= Aleksandr Korzun =

Belarusian footballer

Personal information
- Date of birth: 13 July 2000 (age 26)
- Place of birth: Minsk, Belarus
- Height: 1.92 m (6 ft 4 in)
- Position: Forward

Team information
- Current team: Molodechno
- Number: 93

Youth career
- 2017–2019: Isloch Minsk Raion

Senior career*
Years	Team	Apps	(Gls)
2020	Slonim-2017	21	(6)
2021–2022	Isloch Minsk Raion	1	(0)
2021	→ Orsha (loan)	12	(2)
2023–	Molodechno	13	(3)
- * Club domestic league appearances and goals as of 31 December 2023

Aleksandr Korzun (Belarusian: Аляксандр Корзун; Russian: Александр Корзун; born 13 July 2000) is a Belarusian professional footballer who plays for Molodechno.
