= Olev Siinmaa =

Estonian architect

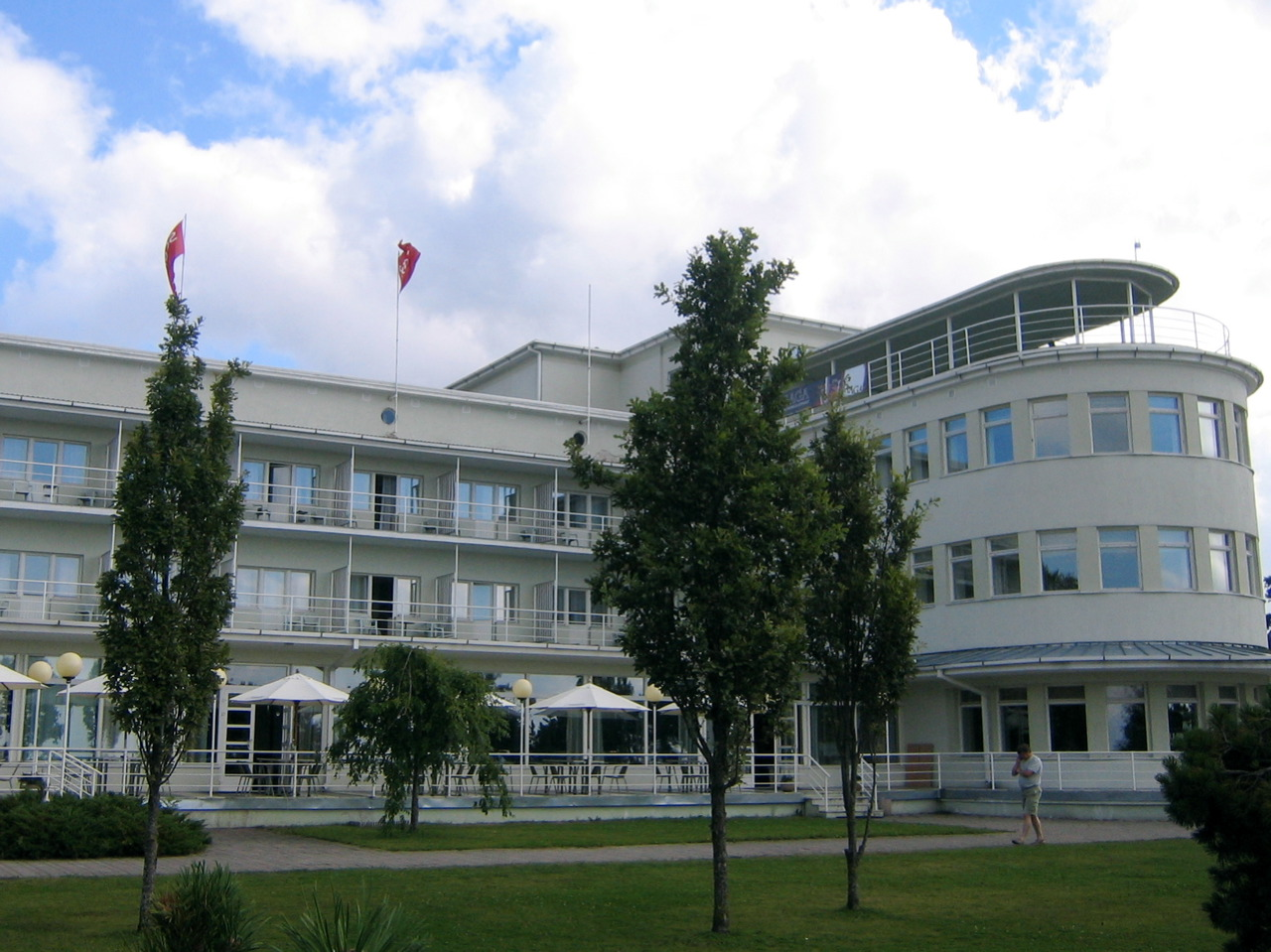
The Pärnu Beach Hotel

Olev Siinmaa (November 12, 1881 – March 29, 1948), was an Estonian architect who is perhaps best recalled for his work in the style coined "Pärnu Resort Functionalism".

Olev Siinmaa was born Oskar Siimann in Pärnu into a joinery shop owner's family. He studied interior and furniture design in Wismar and Konstanz technical schools in Germany. In 1925, he was appointed the architect of the city of Pärnu, Estonia.

Siinmaa's first Functionalist design was in 1930 on Roosikrantsi Street in the Estonian capital of Tallinn. Siinmaa is possibly best recalled as the architect (along with Anton Soans) of the Pärnu Beach Hotel, constructed between 1935 and 1937.

Completed in 1937, the hotel has been described as the "flagship of the new functionalist architecture." In 1938, Siinmaa, along with architect Alar Kotli competed to design the Presidential Palace, which was to be the Building of the Office of the then President of Estonia, Konstantin Päts. Kotli designed the ceremonial spaces of the office building, while the President's Big Office was designed by Siinmaa.

In 1944, Siinmaa emigrated to Norrköping, Sweden where he died in 1948.

In 1994, after several years in disrepair, the Pärnu Beach Hotel was bought by Scandic Hotels, renovated and renamed the Scandic Rannahotell. In 2016, another renovation was completed.
