= List of Chinese Athletics Championships winners =

The Chinese Athletics Championships (Chinese: 全国田径锦标赛圆满) is an annual track and field competition which serves as the national championship for the People's Republic of China. It is organised by Chinese Athletic Association, China's national governing body for the sport of athletics. The event was first organised in 1910 as a men's only championship and women's championship events were introduced in 1959 – much later than at the Chinese National Games, which had featured women nearly thirty years earlier.

== Men ==
=== 100 metres ===
- 1988: Li Tao
- 1989: Yu Gang
- 1990: Li Tao
- 1991: Li Tao
- 1992: Li Tao
- 1993: Chen Wenzhong
- 1994: Chen Wenzhong
- 1995: Chen Wenzhong
- 1996: Chen Wenzhong
- 1997: Zhou Wei
- 1998: Zhou Wei
- 1999: Zhou Wei
- 2000: Chen Haijian
- 2001: Chen Haijian
- 2002: Wang Peng
- 2003: Chen Haijian
- 2004: Shen Yunbao
- 2005: Hu Kai

=== 200 metres ===
- 1988: Cai Jianming
- 1989: Zhao Cunlin
- 1990: Cai Jianming
- 1991: Zhao Cunlin
- 1992: Zhao Cunlin
- 1993: Huang Danwei
- 1994: Chen Wenzhong
- 1995: Li Xiaoping
- 1996: Han Chaoming
- 1997: Yin Hanzhao
- 1998: Han Chaoming
- 1999: Yang Yaozu
- 2000: Xu Zizhou
- 2001: Han Chaoming
- 2002: Yang Yaozu
- 2003: Yang Yaozu
- 2004: Yang Yaozu
- 2005: Liu Haitao

=== 400 metres ===
- 1988: Wang Jianming
- 1989: Zhao Cunlin
- 1990: Tan Guoheng
- 1991: Yu Jun
- 1992: Xie Hong
- 1993: Zhao Cunlin
- 1994: Lei Quan
- 1995: Si Yandong
- 1996: Han Chaoming
- 1997: Tang Weiming
- 1998: Xu Zizhou
- 1999: Xu Zizhou
- 2000: Xu Zizhou
- 2001: Jiang Bo
- 2002: Ni Zhenjie
- 2003: Xu Zizhou
- 2004: Wang Liangyu
- 2005: Wang Liangyu

=== 800 metres ===
- 1988: Lou Shaolong
- 1989: Liang Siguang
- 1990: Lou Shaolong
- 1991: Han Bo
- 1992: Han Bo
- 1993: Lin Jun
- 1994: Min Weiguo
- 1995: Liu Gengqiang
- 1996: Song Mingyou
- 1997: Jiang Zhidong
- 1998: Cheng Bing
- 1999: Liu Gengqiang
- 2000: Li Guangming
- 2001: Li Huiquan
- 2002: Li Huiquan
- 2003: Li Huiquan
- 2004: Chi Yinan
- 2005: Li Guangming

=== 1500 metres ===
- 1988: Zhang Yuejin
- 1989: Duan Xiuquan
- 1990: Chen Hongen
- 1991: Ji Longhui
- 1992: Wang Da
- 1993: Lin Jun
- 1994: Song Pengyou
- 1995: Song Pengyou
- 1996: Song Mingyou
- 1997: Song Mingyou
- 1998: Song Mingyou
- 1999: Gao Shuai
- 2000: Dou Zhaobo
- 2001: Dou Zhaobo
- 2002: Dou Zhaobo
- 2003: Dou Zhaobo
- 2004: Li Yan
- 2005: Gu Ming

=== 5000 metres ===
- 1988: Wang Helin
- 1989: Zhang Guowei
- 1990: Zhang Guowei
- 1991: Wang Helin
- 1992: Jiu Shangxuan
- 1993: Ning Limin
- 1994: Sun Ripeng
- 1995: Xia Fengyuan
- 1996: Sun Ripeng
- 1997: Cao Changhai
- 1998: Xia Fengyuan
- 1999: Chen Fuchun
- 2000: Xia Fengyuan
- 2001: Zhang Yunshan
- 2002: Liu Huyuan
- 2003: Han Gang
- 2004: Chen Mingfu
- 2005: Zhang Yunshan

=== 10,000 metres ===
- 1988: Zhang Guowei
- 1989: Zhang Guowei
- 1990: Jiu Shangxuan
- 1991: Han Zongmin
- 1992: Wang Helin
- 1993: Han Zongmin
- 1994: Zhang Fukui
- 1995: Xia Fengyuan
- 1996: Xia Fengyuan
- 1997: Xia Fengyuan
- 1998: Xia Fengyuan
- 1999: Yang Guocai
- 2000: Xia Fengyuan
- 2001: Zhang Yunshan
- 2002: Zhang Yunshan
- 2003: Gong Ke
- 2004: Zheng Kai
- 2005: Zhang Yunshan

=== Marathon ===
- 1988: Zhu Shuchun
- 1989: Zhang Guowei
- 1990: ?
- 1991: Liu Min
- 1992: Hu Gangjun
- 1993: Zhang Fukui
- 1994: Han Zongmin
- 1995: Dong Jianmin
- 1996: Meng Xianhui
- 1997: Hao Lijun
- 1998: Zhan Donglin
- 1999: ?
- 2000: Zhu Ronghua
- 2001: Chai Jiahua
- 2002: Gong Ke
- 2003: Li Zhuhong
- 2004: Li Zhuhong
- 2005: Li Jianfei
- 2006: Deng Haiyang

=== 3000 metres steeplechase ===
- 1988: Gao Shuhai
- 1989: Wang Shubo
- 1990: Niu Xinhui
- 1991: Gao Shuhai
- 1992: Gao Shuhai
- 1993: Gao Shuhai
- 1994: Gao Shuhai
- 1995: Liu Lijun
- 1996: Qin Gang
- 1997: Li Changzhong
- 1998: Li Changzhong
- 1999: Sun Wenli
- 2000: Sun Wenli
- 2001: Sun Jiawei
- 2002: Sun Wenli
- 2003: Sun Wenli
- 2004: Sun Wenyong
- 2005: Sun Wenyong

=== 110 metres hurdles ===
- 1988: Yu Zhicheng
- 1989: Yang Guang
- 1990: Yu Zhicheng
- 1991: Zheng Jinsuo
- 1992: Liu Tao
- 1993: Zheng Jinsuo
- 1994: Chen Yanjie
- 1995: Chen Yanhao
- 1996: Chen Yanhao
- 1997: Chen Yanhao
- 1998: Chen Yanhao
- 1999: Chen Yanhao
- 2000: Zhang Feng
- 2001: Chen Yanhao
- 2002: Liu Xiang
- 2003: Shi Dongpeng
- 2004: Liu Xiang
- 2005: Liu Xiang

=== 400 metres hurdles ===
- 1988: Song Xinliang
- 1989: Wu Hongyu
- 1990: Shen Yi
- 1991: Shen Yi
- 1992: Gao Yonghong
- 1993: Du Yuechun
- 1994: Yang Xianjun
- 1995: Du Yuechun
- 1996: Tan Chunhua
- 1997: Tan Chunhua
- 1998: Tan Chunhua
- 1999: Lao Jiangfeng
- 2000: Meng Yan
- 2001: Tan Chunhua
- 2002: Meng Yan
- 2003: Shao Yi
- 2004: Meng Yan
- 2005: Zhang Shibao

=== High jump ===
- 1988: Zhu Jianhua
- 1989: Liu Yunpeng
- 1990: Zhou Zhongge
- 1991: Xu Yang
- 1992: Xu Yang
- 1993: Xu Yang
- 1994: Tao Xu
- 1995: Bi Hongyong
- 1996: Niu Jiang
- 1997: Bi Hongyong
- 1998: Zhou Zhongge
- 1999: Wang Zhouzhou
- 2000: Zhou Zhongge
- 2001: Zhou Zhongge
- 2002: Wang Zhouzhou
- 2003: Wang Zhouzhou
- 2004: Liu Yang
- 2005: Zhang Shufeng

=== Pole vault ===
- 1988: Qin Cheng
- 1989: Liang Xueren
- 1990: Liang Xueren
- 1991: Ge Yun
- 1992: Ge Yun
- 1993: Ge Yun
- 1994: Zhao Mingqiang
- 1995: Ge Yun
- 1996: Xu Gang
- 1997: Xu Gang
- 1998: Xu Gang
- 1999: Xu Gang
- 2000: Zhang Hongwei
- 2001: Wu Jun
- 2002: Li Huasen
- 2003: Zhang Hongwei
- 2004: Zhang Hongwei
- 2005: Zhang Hongwei

=== Long jump ===
- 1988: Pang Yan
- 1989: Ma Guiming
- 1990: Huang Geng
- 1991: Chen Zunrong
- 1992: Huang Geng
- 1993: Xu Bin
- 1994: Huang Geng
- 1995: Huang Geng
- 1996: Huang Geng
- 1997: Lao Jianfeng
- 1998: Xu Bin
- 1999: Huang Le
- 2000: Wang Cheng
- 2001: Li Dalong
- 2002: Wang Cheng
- 2003: Huang Le
- 2004: Zhou Can
- 2005: Li Runrun

=== Triple jump ===
- 1988: Chen Yanping
- 1989: Chen Yanping
- 1990: Chen Yanping
- 1991: Zou Sixin
- 1992: Wu Lijun
- 1993: Zou Sixin
- 1994: Zou Sixin
- 1995: Zeng Lizhi
- 1996: Zou Sixin
- 1997: Zou Sixin
- 1998: Duan Qifeng
- 1999: Wu Ji
- 2000: Lao Jianfeng
- 2001: Lao Jianfeng
- 2002: Lao Jianfeng
- 2003: Gu Junjie
- 2004: Li Yanxi
- 2005: Zhu Shujing

=== Shot put ===
- 1988: Ma Yongfeng
- 1989: Cheng Zhaowen
- 1990: Ma Yongfeng
- 1991: Cheng Shaobo
- 1992: Ma Yongfeng
- 1993: Xie Shengying
- 1994: Liu Hao
- 1995: Liu Hao
- 1996: Liu Hao
- 1997: Wen Jili
- 1998: Liu Hao
- 1999: Wen Jili
- 2000: Liu Hao
- 2001: Wen Jili
- 2002: Jia Peng
- 2003: Wang Zhiyong
- 2004: Jia Peng
- 2005: Jia Peng

=== Discus throw ===
- 1988: Zhang Jinglong
- 1989: Zhang Jinglong
- 1990: Wang Daoming
- 1991: Yu Wenge
- 1992: Yu Wenge
- 1993: Zhang Cunbiao
- 1994: Ma Wei
- 1995: Ma Wei
- 1996: Li Shaojie
- 1997: Yu Wenge
- 1998: Zhang Cunbiao
- 1999: Li Shaojie
- 2000: Li Shaojie
- 2001: Wu Tao
- 2002: Wu Tao
- 2003: Wu Tao
- 2004: Wu Tao
- 2005: Wu Tao

=== Hammer throw ===
- 1988: ?
- 1989: Yu Guangming
- 1990: Bi Zhong
- 1991: Bi Zhong
- 1992: Bi Zhong
- 1993: Bi Zhong
- 1994: Bi Zhong
- 1995: Bi Zhong
- 1996: Bi Zhong
- 1997: Bi Zhong
- 1998: Ye Kuigang
- 1999: Ye Kuigang
- 2000: Ye Kuigang
- 2001: Ye Kuigang
- 2002: Ye Kuigang
- 2003: Ye Kuigang
- 2004: Ye Kuigang
- 2005: Zhao Yihai

=== Javelin throw ===
- 1988: Ji Zhanzheng
- 1989: Wang Zhongwen
- 1990: Tang Linhua
- 1991: Zhang Lianbiao
- 1992: Zhang Lianbiao
- 1993: Zhang Lianbiao
- 1994: Zhang Lianbiao
- 1995: Zhang Lianbiao
- 1996: Zhang Lianbiao
- 1997: Gao Wenxu
- 1998: Li Rongxiang
- 1999: Li Rongxiang
- 2000: Zhang Lianbiao
- 2001: Li Rongxiang
- 2002: Li Rongxiang
- 2003: Li Rongxiang
- 2004: Chen Qi
- 2005: Chen Qi

=== Decathlon ===
- 1988: Wang Yan
- 1989: Ji Rongxin
- 1990: Gong Guohua
- 1991: Cai Min
- 1992: Cai Min
- 1993: Zhao Bingchun
- 1994: Cai Min
- 1995: Zhong Hongxin
- 1996: Guo Zhengrong
- 1997: Song Shulin
- 1998: Song Shulin
- 1999: Cao Wen
- 2000: Du Xiaopeng
- 2001: Qi Haifeng
- 2002: Qi Haifeng
- 2003: Qi Haifeng
- 2004: Qi Haifeng
- 2005: Qi Haifeng

=== 20 kilometres walk ===
Held on a track from 1988 to 1992. Both track and road events were held from 1998 to 2000. Multiple national championships in the 20 km road event have been held since 2002, with both a spring and autumn Chinese Race Walking Championships taking place.

- 1988: ?
- 1989: Chen Helin
- 1990: Li Mingcai
- 1991: Li Mingcai
- 1992: Li Mingcai
- 1993: Li Mingcai
- 1994: Bu Lingtang
- 1995: Tan Mingjun
- 1996: Li Mingcai
- 1997: Yu Guohui
- 1998: Yu Guohui (road & track)
- 1999: He Xiaodong (road) & Wu Ping (track)
- 2000: Yu Guohui (spring road) & Li Zewen (autumn road and track)
- 2001: Li Zewen
- 2002: Yu Chaohong (spring) & Lü Ronghua (autumn)
- 2003: Zhu Hongjun (spring) & Yu Chaohong (autumn)
- 2004: Han Yucheng (spring) & Cui Zhide (autumn)
- 2005: Yu Chaohong (spring)

=== 50 kilometres walk ===
Multiple national championships in the 50 km road event have been held since 2002, with both a spring and autumn Chinese Race Walking Championships taking place. The 1999 autumn championship was held on a track.

- 1988: ?
- 1989: Li Baojin
- 1990: Zhai Wanbo
- 1991: Sun Xiaoguang
- 1992: Mao Xinyuan
- 1993: Chen Shaoguo
- 1994: Zhou Yongsheng
- 1995: Shen Weihui
- 1996: Zhao Yongsheng
- 1997: Zhao Yongsheng
- 1998: Wang Yinhang
- 1999: Wang Yinhang (road) & Zhao Yongsheng (track)
- 2000: Zhang Huiqiang (spring) & Wang Yinhang (autumn)
- 2001: Wang Yinhang
- 2002: Wang Yinhang (spring) & Bian Aiguo (autumn)
- 2003: Yu Chaohong (spring & autumn)
- 2004: Han Yucheng (spring) & Xing Shucai (autumn)
- 2005: Han Yucheng (spring)

== Women ==
=== 100 metres ===
- 1988: Tian Yumei
- 1989: Zhang Caihua
- 1990: Tian Yumei
- 1991: Xiao Yehua
- 1992: Gao Han
- 1993: Wang Lei
- 1994: Huang Xiaoyan
- 1995: Xiao Yehua
- 1996: Yan Jiankui
- 1997: Li Xuemei
- 1998: Li Yali
- 1999: Huang Mei
- 2000: Li Xuemei
- 2001: Chen Yueqin
- 2002: Qin Wangping
- 2003: Qin Wangping
- 2004: Li Xuemei
- 2005: Qin Wangping

=== 200 metres ===
- 1988: Xie Zhiling
- 1989: Liu Yunli
- 1990: Tian Yumei
- 1991: Chen Zhaojing
- 1992: Chen Zhaojing
- 1993: Chen Zhaojing
- 1994: Chen Zhaojing
- 1995: Zhu Yihong
- 1996: Yan Jiankui
- 1997: Li Xuemei
- 1998: Yan Jiankui
- 1999: Qin Wangping
- 2000: Li Xuemei
- 2001: Huang Mei
- 2002: Qin Wangping
- 2003: Qin Wangping
- 2004: Li Xuemei
- 2005: Qin Wangping

=== 400 metres ===
- 1988: Sun Sumei
- 1989: Sun Sumei
- 1990: Li Guilian
- 1991: Huang Yanhong
- 1992: Sun Sumei
- 1993: Ma Yuqin
- 1994: Ma Yuqin
- 1995: Li Jing
- 1996: Du Xiujie
- 1997: Zhang Hengyun
- 1998: Chen Yuxiang
- 1999: Zhong Shaoting
- 2000: Bu Fanfang
- 2001: Chen Yuxiang
- 2002: Chen Yuxiang
- 2003: Sun Hongfeng
- 2004: Tang Xiaoyin
- 2005: Tang Xiaoyin

=== 800 metres ===
- 1988: Mao Yujie
- 1989: Sun Sumei
- 1990: Zheng Lijuan
- 1991: Zhang Yumei
- 1992: Sun Sumei
- 1993: Chen Xuehui
- 1994: Qu Yunxia
- 1995: Zhang Jian
- 1996: Zhang Jian
- 1997: Zhang Xiaolan
- 1998: Zhang Jian
- 1999: Lin Na
- 2000: Wang Yuanping
- 2001: Feng Lei
- 2002: Liu Xiaoping
- 2003: Liu Xiaoping
- 2004: Liu Xiaoping
- 2005: Liu Qing

=== 1500 metres ===
- 1988: Liu Aicun
- 1989: Feng Yangbo
- 1990: Zheng Lijuan
- 1991: Zhang Yumei
- 1992: Qu Yunxia
- 1993: Wei Li
- 1994: Qu Yunxia
- 1995: Yan Wei
- 1996: Wang Chunmei
- 1997: Yan Wei
- 1998: Yan Wei
- 1999: Wang Chunmei
- 2000: Wu Qingdong
- 2001: Wang Chunmei
- 2002: Lin Na
- 2003: Xing Huina
- 2004: Xing Huina
- 2005: Liu Qing

=== 3000 metres ===
- 1988: Wang Yanling
- 1989: Wang Xiuting
- 1990: Zhong Huandi
- 1991: Zheng Lijuan
- 1992: Qu Yunxia
- 1993: Wang Junxia
- 1994: Wang Xiaoxia

=== 5000 metres ===
- 1988: Wang Huabi
- 1989: Zhong Huandi
- 1990: Not held
- 1991: Zheng Lijuan
- 1992: Wei Li
- 1993: Not held
- 1994: Not held
- 1995: Wang Junxia
- 1996: Wang Junxia
- 1997: Liu Shixiang
- 1998: Wang Chunmei
- 1999: Wang Chunmei
- 2000: Dong Yanmei
- 2001: Wang Chunmei
- 2002: Sun Yingjie
- 2003: Sun Yingjie
- 2004: Xing Huina
- 2005: Xing Huina

=== 10,000 metres ===
- 1988: Li Xiuxen
- 1989: Zhong Huandi
- 1990: Zhong Huandi
- 1991: Zhong Huandi
- 1992: Zhong Huandi
- 1993: Wang Junxia
- 1994: Wang Junxia
- 1995: Dong Zhaoxia
- 1996: Wang Junxia
- 1997: Dong Zhaoxia
- 1998: Liu Shixiang
- 1999: Zheng Guixia
- 2000: Li Ji
- 2001: Dai Yanyan
- 2002: Sun Yingjie
- 2003: Sun Yingjie
- 2004: Sun Yingjie
- 2005: Zhou Chunxiu

=== Marathon ===
- 1988: ?
- 1989: Xie Lihua
- 1990: ?
- 1991: Li Yemei
- 1992: Xie Lihua
- 1993: Wang Junxia
- 1994: Ren Xiujuan
- 1995: Zheng Guixia
- 1996: Ren Xiujuan
- 1997: Zheng Guixia
- 1998: Sun Yingjie
- 1999: Zheng Guixia
- 2000: Ren Xiujuan
- 2001: Zheng Guixia
- 2002: Liu Min
- 2003: Zhou Chunxiu
- 2004: Zhou Chunxiu
- 2005: Zhou Chunxiu
- 2006: Sun Weiwei

=== 3000 metres steeplechase ===
- 2003: Chen Xiaofang

=== 100 metres hurdles ===
- 1988: Liu Huayin
- 1989: Xiao Zifang
- 1990: Luo Bin
- 1991: Zhang Yu
- 1992: Zhang Yu
- 1993: Zhang Yu
- 1994: Zhang Yu
- 1995: Zhou Jing
- 1996: Zhang Yu
- 1997: Zhang Yu
- 1998: Deng Xiaocen
- 1999: Feng Yun
- 2000: Su Yiping
- 2001: Feng Yun
- 2002: Su Yiping
- 2003: Su Yiping
- 2004: Su Yiping
- 2005: Feng Yun

=== 400 metres hurdles ===
- 1988: Chen Dongmei
- 1989: Chen Juying
- 1990: Chen Juying
- 1991: Huang Yanhong
- 1992: Zhang Weimin
- 1993: Guo Yue
- 1994: Leng Xueyan
- 1995: Zhou Wei
- 1996: Wu Wei
- 1997: Ma Xiaoyan
- 1998: Song Yinglan
- 1999: Li Yulian
- 2000: Li Yulian
- 2001: Song Yinglan
- 2002: Yao Yuehua
- 2003: Hung Xiaoxiao
- 2004: Yao Yuehua
- 2005: Wang Xing

=== High jump ===
- 1988: Jin Ling
- 1989: Wang Hui
- 1990: Zhang Tong
- 1991: Fu Xiuhong
- 1992: Wang Wei
- 1993: Ge Ping
- 1994: Guan Weihua
- 1995: Liu Yen
- 1996: Wang Wei
- 1997: Wang Wei
- 1998: Jin Ling
- 1999: Jing Xuezhu
- 2000: Zhang Liwen
- 2001: Jing Xuezhu
- 2002: Lu Jieming
- 2003: Jing Xuezhu
- 2004: Jing Xuezhu
- 2005: Jing Xuezhu

=== Pole vault ===
- 1989: Wu Weili
- 1990: Zhang Chunzhen
- 1991: Zhang Chunzhen
- 1992: Sun Caiyun
- 1993: Sun Caiyun
- 1994: Cai Weiyan
- 1995: Zhong Guiqing
- 1996: Sun Caiyun
- 1997: Cai Weiyan
- 1998: Cai Weiyan
- 1999: Sun Caiyun
- 2000: Gao Shuying
- 2001: Gao Shuying
- 2002: Gao Shuying
- 2003: Zhao Yingying
- 2004: Gao Shuying
- 2005: Zhao Yingying

=== Long jump ===
- 1988: Xiong Qiying
- 1989: Liu Shuzhen
- 1990: Liu Shuzhen
- 1991: Wang Chunfang
- 1992: Liu Shuzhen
- 1993: Yao Weili
- 1994: Li Jing
- 1995: Feng Jie
- 1996: Zhong Mei
- 1997: Xiong Qiying
- 1998: Guan Yingnan
- 1999: Guan Yingnan
- 2000: Guan Yingnan
- 2001: Zhong Mei
- 2002: Jin Yan
- 2003: Liang Shuyan
- 2004: Guan Yingnan
- 2005: Wang Lina

=== Triple jump ===
- 1989: Fu Xiaorong
- 1990: Li Huirong
- 1991: Li Huirong
- 1992: Li Huirong
- 1993: Zhang Yan
- 1994: Ren Ruiping
- 1995: Ren Ruiping
- 1996: Ren Ruiping
- 1997: Ren Ruiping
- 1998: Wu Lingmei
- 1999: Ren Ruiping
- 2000: Ren Ruiping
- 2001: Wu Lingmei
- 2002: Huang Qiuyan
- 2003: Huang Qiuyan
- 2004: Huang Qiuyan
- 2005: Huang Qiuyan

=== Shot put ===
- 1988: Huang Zhihong
- 1989: Huang Zhihong
- 1990: Huang Zhihong
- 1991: Huang Zhihong
- 1992: Huang Zhihong
- 1993: Zhou Tianhua
- 1994: Zhang Liuhong
- 1995: Sui Xinmei
- 1996: Li Meisu
- 1997: Li Meisu
- 1998: Li Meisu
- 1999: Cheng Xiaoyan
- 2000: Song Feina
- 2001: Cheng Xiaoyan
- 2002: Li Meiju
- 2003: Li Fengfeng
- 2004: Li Meiju
- 2005: Li Meiju

=== Discus throw ===
- 1988: Hou Xuemei
- 1989: Hou Xuemei
- 1990: Hou Xuemei
- 1991: Min Chunfeng
- 1992: Qiu Qiaoping
- 1993: Zhang Cuilan
- 1994: Qiu Qiaoping
- 1995: Cao Qi
- 1996: Xiao Yanling
- 1997: Liu Fengying
- 1998: Liu Fengying
- 1999: Luan Zhili
- 2000: Xiao Yanling
- 2001: Song Aimin
- 2002: Song Aimin
- 2003: Song Aimin
- 2004: Huang Qun
- 2005: Sun Taifeng

=== Hammer throw ===
- 1998: Gu Yuan
- 1999: Zhao Wei
- 2000: Liu Yinghui
- 2001: Zhao Wei
- 2002: Liu Yinghui
- 2003: Gu Yuan
- 2004: Zhang Wenxiu
- 2005: Zhang Wenxiu

=== Javelin throw ===
- 1988: Zhang Li
- 1989: Xin Xiaoli
- 1990: Xu Demei
- 1991: Xu Demei
- 1992: Ha Xiaoyan
- 1993: Zhang Li
- 1994: Zhang Li
- 1995: Tang Lishuang
- 1996: Li Lei
- 1997: Wang Yan
- 1998: Chu Chunxia
- 1999: Wang Yaning
- 2000: Liang Lili
- 2001: Ha Xiaoyan
- 2002: Liang Lili
- 2003: Ma Ning
- 2004: Xue Juan
- 2005: Xue Juan

=== Heptathlon ===
- 1988: Dong Yuping
- 1989: Wu Ping
- 1990: Ma Miaolan
- 1991: Zhu Yuqing
- 1992: Zhu Yuqing
- 1993: Ma Miaolan
- 1994: Zhang Xiaohui
- 1995: Wang Xiuyan
- 1996: Ding Ying
- 1997: Liu Bo
- 1998: Ding Ying
- 1999: Wang Hailan
- 2000: Liu Xing
- 2001: Wang Hailan
- 2002: Shen Shengfei
- 2003: Shen Shengfei
- 2004: Shen Shengfei
- 2005: Shen Shengfei

=== 5000 metres walk ===
- 1988: Cui Yingzi
- 1989: Chen Yueling
- 1990: Jin Bingjie
- 1991: Chen Yueling

=== 10 kilometres walk ===
The event was held on a track in 1989. A track and a road championship were staged in 1992, 1993 and 1998 to 2000. Multiple national championships in the 10 km road event were held in 2002 and 2003, with both a spring and an autumn Chinese Race Walking Championships taking place.

- 1988: ?
- 1989: Chen Yueling (track)
- 1990: Li Jingxue
- 1991: Chen Yueling
- 1992: Chen Yueling (road) & Cui Yingzi (track)
- 1993: Wang Yan (road and track)
- 1994: Gao Hongmiao
- 1995: Feng Haixia
- 1996: Gao Hongmiao
- 1997: Wang Yuntao
- 1998: Wang Yan (road) & Gao Mingxia (track)
- 1999: Gu Yan (road) & Li Hong (track)
- 2000: Li Hong (road) & Gao Hongmiao (track)
- 2001: Li Hong
- 2002: Gao Kelian (spring) & Zuo Yan (autumn)
- 2003: Gao Kelian (spring)

=== 20 kilometres walk ===
Multiple national championships in the 20 km road event have been held since 2002, with both a spring and an autumn Chinese Race Walking Championships taking place. The 1999 autumn race was held on a track.

- 1994: Gao Hongmiao
- 1995: Liu Hongyu
- 1996: Feng Haixia
- 1997: Liu Hongyu
- 1998: Pam Hailian
- 1999: Xue Ailing (spring) & Li Yuxin (autumn)
- 2000: Wang Liping (spring & autumn)
- 2001: Gao Hongmiao
- 2002: Gao Kelian & Zuo Yan (autumn)
- 2003: Song Hongjuan (spring) & Zhang Nan (autumn)
- 2004: Song Hongjuan (spring) & Jiang Jing (autumn)
- 2005: Jiang Jing (spring)
