= Athletics at the 1993 National Games of China =

Athletics at the 7th National Games of China
- Dates: September 1993
- Host city: Beijing, PR China
- Venue: Workers' Stadium
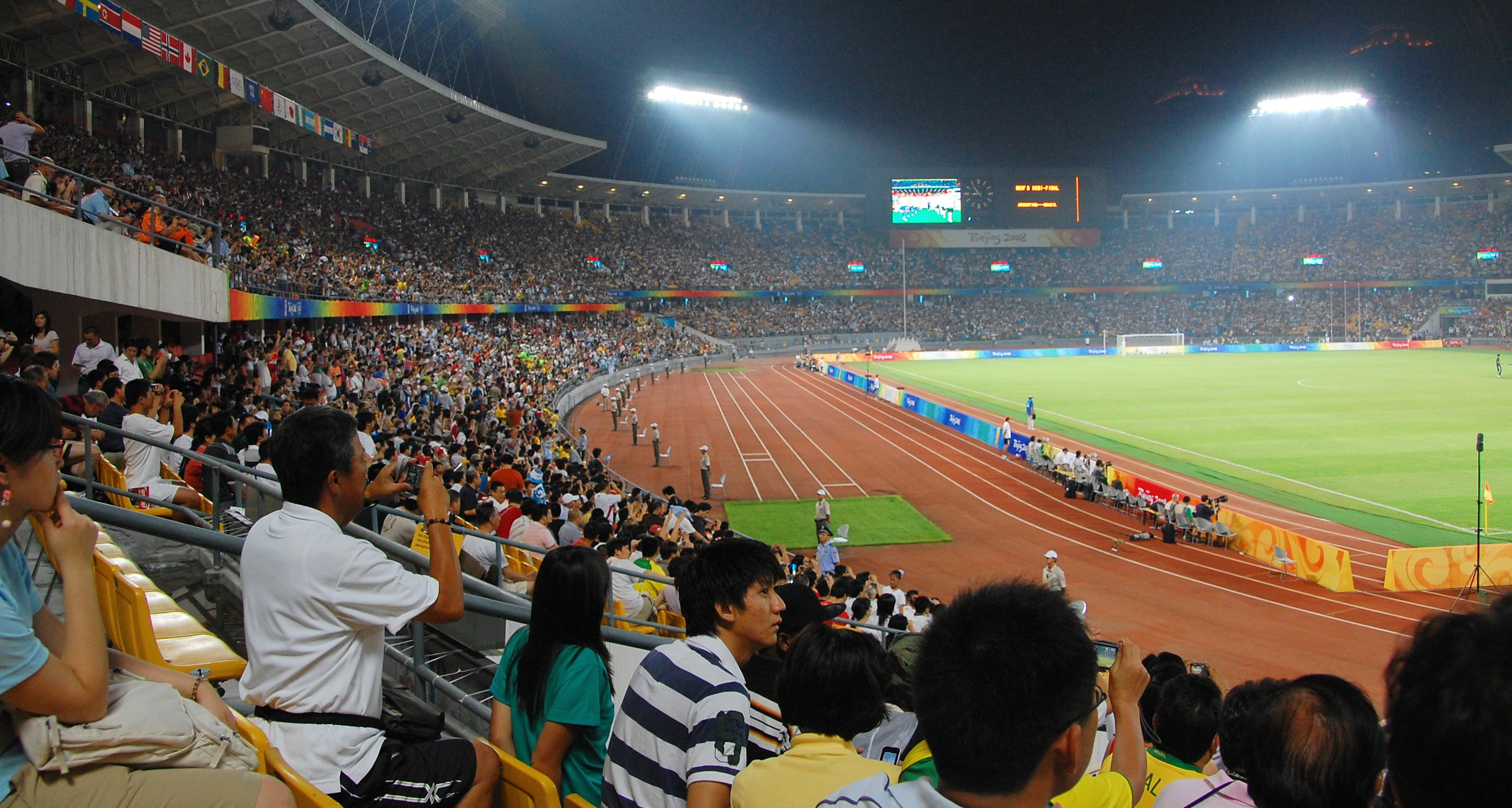

At the 7th National Games of the People's Republic of China, the athletics events were held in Beijing in September 1993.

== Medal summary ==
=== Men's events ===
Event	Gold		Silver		Bronze	
100 metres (+2.0)	Li Tao; Sichuan	10.24 =NR	Lin Wei; Guangxi	10.26	Xia Xianghai; Sichuan	10.26
200 metres (-1.3)	Huang Danwei; Guangdong	20.92	Zhao Cunlin; Hebei	20.96	Luo Xuming; Guangdong	20.99
400 metres	Zhao Cunlin; Hebei	45.85 NR	Si Yandong; Shaanxi	46.53	Yu Baoyi; Beijing	46.55
800 metres	Mu Weiguo; Liaoning	1:49.27	Zhang Yi; People's Liberation Army	1;49.67	Song Mingyou; Shandong	1:50.17
1500 metres	Liu Fuxiang; Shandong	3:48.68	Song Mingyou; Shandong	3:49.20	Ding Weifeng; Liaoning	3:49.54
5000 metres	Hong Bo; Henan	13:32.46	Han Zongmin; Gansu	13:32.89	Zhang Fukui; Liaoning	13:34.41
10,000 metres	Jiu Shangxuan; Henan	28:40.81	Sun Ripeng; Liaoning	28:41.72	Han Zongmin; Gansu	28:42.33
110 m hurdles	Chen Yanhao; Shanghai	13.49	Li Tong; Beijing	13.59	Zhou Zhong; Beijing	13.96
400 m hurdles	Yang Xianjun; Liaoning	49.59 NR	Gao Yonghong; Shandong	49.93	Du Yuechun; Anhui	50.08
3000 metre steeplechase	Sun Ripeng; Liaoning	8:24.87 NR/NJR	Gao Shuhai; Hebei	8:33.60	Qin Gang; Jilin	8:33.67
4×100 m relay	Guangdong; Liang Mingzhong; Zheng Yubin; Huang Danwei; Luo Xuming	39.16	Guangxi	39.52	Sichuan	39.57
4×400 m relay	Beijing	3:08.54	Guangdong	3:09.34	Jiangsu	3:10.32
Marathon	Zhang Fukui; Liaoning	2:11:10	Wu Yi; Tianjin	2:13:27	Ning Limin; Liaoning	2:14:29
20 km race walk	Chen Shaoguo; Yunnan	1:19:43	Bu Lingtang; Gansu	1:19:49	Li Mingcai; Shandong	1:20:00
50 km race walk	Li Mingcai; Shandong	3:49:17	Jin Guohong; Liaoning	3:55.08	Zhou Yongsheng; Jiangsu	3:58:07
High jump	Xu Yang; Jiangsu	2.31 m	Bi Hongyong; Shandong	2.28 m	Zhou Zhongge; Beijing	2.25 m
Pole vault	Liang Xueren; Fujian	5.30 m	Cheng Yueyi; Fujian	5.20 m	Li Anquan; Sichuan	5.20 m
Long jump	Huang Geng; Henan	8.30 m	Jia Xinli; Hebei	8.01 m	Lang Yong; Sichuan	7.90 m
Triple jump	Zou Sixin; Hunan	17.26 m	Duan Qifeng; Hebei	16.96 m	Xu Dongwen; Liaoning	16.94 m
Shot put	Liu Hao; Beijing	19.72 m	Ma Yongfeng; Liaoning	19.69 m	Cheng Shaobo; Liaoning	18.59 m
Discus throw	Li Shaojie; Shandong	60.86 m	Ma Wei; Liaoning	60.62 m	Nu Erliang; Xinjiang	59.82 m
Hammer throw	Bi Zhong; Jiangxi	72.52 m	Wang Guoqing; Shaanxi	68.16 m	Li Jianhua; Heilongjiang	67.44 m
Javelin throw	Zhang Lianbiao; Hunan	78.52 m	Yang Hongtao; Tianjin	76.46 m	Tang Linhua; Zhejiang	76.44 m
Decathlon	Guo Jin; Liaoning	7780 pts	Gong Guohua; Jiangxi	7704 pts	Zhao Bingchun; Shandong	7641 pts

=== Women's events ===
Event	Gold		Silver		Bronze	
100 metres (+1.2)	Liu Xiaomei; Sichuan	11.02 AR	Tian Yumei; Guangxi	11.24	Chen Yan; Sichuan	11.28
200 metres (-2.1)	Chen Zhaojing; Tianjin	22.56 =AR	Liu Xiaomei; Sichuan	22.70	Wang Ping; Shandong	22.79
200 metres (-2.1)	Chen Zhaojing equaled Taiwanese Wang Huei-chen area record, set one year before.					
400 metres	Ma Yuqin; Hebei	49.81 AR	Zhang Hengyun; Jiangsu	51.25	Liu Weiwei; Anhui	51.33
400 metres	Former Asian junior champion Ma Yuqin set a new Asian record of 49.81 seconds, ranking her first of the world 400 metres top list in 1993. Zhang Hengyun, only 19, clocked 51.25 seconds to break the area junior record.					
800 metres	Liu Dong; Liaoning	1:55.54 AR	Qu Yunxia; Liaoning	1:56.24	Liu Li; Liaoning	1:57.18
800 metres	During the heats, 17-year-old Wang Yuan bettered Maria Mutola's junior record of 1:57.63 to 1:57.18. She eventually finished fifth of the final.					
1500 metres	Qu Yunxia; Liaoning	3:50.46 WR	Wang Junxia; Liaoning	3:51.92	Zhang Linli; Liaoning	3:57.46
1500 metres	Wang Yuan, who finished seventh of the race, clocked 3:59.81 to break her own world junior record she had achieved during the heats.					
3000 metres	Wang Junxia; Liaoning	8:06.11 WR	Qu Yunxia; Liaoning	8:12.18	Zhang Linli; Liaoning	8:16.50
10,000 metres	Wang Junxia; Liaoning	29:31.78 WR	Zhong Huandi; Yunnan	30:13.37	Zhang Lirong; Liaoning	31:09.25
100 m hurdles (+0.1)	Zhang Yu; Tianjin	12.64 AR	Xie Liuying; Guangxi	12.75	Zhou Hongyan; Hebei	12.90
400 m hurdles	Han Qing; Beijing	53.96 AR	Guo Yue; Tianjin	54.47 †	Leng Xueyan; China Petroleum	54.52
4×100 m relay	Guangxi; Xiao Yehua; Tian Yumei; Huang Mei; Ou Yanlan	43.16	Sichuan	43.36	Hunan	43.57
4×400 m relay	Hebei; An Xiaohong; Bai Xiaoyun; Cao Chunying; Ma Yuqin	3:24.28 AR	Guangxi	3:28.58	Tianjin	3:28.87
Marathon	Wang Junxia; Liaoning	2:24:07	Qu Yunxia; Liaoning	2:24:32	Zhang Linli; Liaoning	2:24:42
10 km race walk	Li Chunxiu; Qinghai	41:48	Gao Hongmiao; Liaoning	41:57	Yan Hong; Liaoning	42:46
High jump	Jin Ling; Liaoning	1.94 m	Wang Wei; Shandong	1.91 m	Ge Ping; Guangdong	1.88 m
Long jump	Ma Miaolan; Zhejiang	7.06 m (w)	Yao Weili; Heilongjiang	6.81 m	Xiong Qiying; Sichuan	6.79 m
Triple jump	Ren Ruiping; Shandong	14.29 m	Zhang Yan; Guangdong	14.28 m	Ma Miaolan; Zhejiang	14.12 m
Shot put	Zhou Tianhua; Jiangsu	20.00 m	Zhang Liuhong; Jiangsu	19.90 m	Zhang Zhiying; Inner Mongolia	19.77 m
Discus throw	Cao Qi; Inner Mongolia	66.08 m	Zhao Yonghua; Liaoning	64.42 m	Luan Zhili; Shandong	63.58 m
Javelin throw	Ha Xiaoyan; Shaanxi	65.44 m	Zhang Li; Tianjin	64.06 m	Xu Demei; Zhejiang	62.10 m
Heptathlon	Ma Miaolan; Zhejiang	6750 pts AR	Zhu Yuqing; People's Liberation Army	6394 pts	Wu Shuling; Liaoning	6249 pts
