= Athletics at the 1993 East Asian Games =

Athletics at the 1st East Asian Games
- Dates: 9 – 18 May
- Host city: Shanghai, PR China
- Venue: Yuanshen Sports Centre Stadium
- Level: Senior
- Events: 41
- Participation: ? athletes from 8 nations

At the 1993 East Asian Games, the athletics events were held at the Yuanshen Sports Centre Stadium in Shanghai, People's Republic of China. A total of 41 events were contested, 22 by male and 19 by female athletes. The competition featured only track and field events as there was no marathon race and the 20 km walk was held on the track.

The host country, China, dominated the proceedings by winning the most gold medals and having the highest overall total. Chinese athletes won 29 of the 41 events, and won all of the women's competitions except two sprinting events, with a total of 62 medals. Japan was second with a total of 29 medals, while South Korea was the third-most successful nation with 12 medals. All the countries at the Games won at least one medal in the athletics competition, with the sole exception of Macau.

Wang Huei-Chen, representing Chinese Taipei, was the only woman to upset the Chinese hegemony and she won the gold in both the 100 metres and 200 metres events. Qu Yunxia won the 1500 metres – an event that she went on to set a long-standing world record in at the 1993 Chinese National Games. The hammer throw saw 18-year-old Koji Murofushi (later an Olympic champion) reach his first international podium, winning a bronze medal. Zhang Lirong became the first and only women's 3000 metres champion of the Games as the event was replaced with the 5000 metres in 1997. Three athletes reached the podium in two individual events: Li Yong-Ae of North Korea won silver medals in the long and triple jump, her teammate Choi Ok-Soon was the 800 m and 1500 m bronze medallist, and Lee Myung-Sun won the javelin silver and shot put bronze.

A number of athletes went on to further success at the 1994 Asian Games: among the men's East Asian Games gold medallists, Lee Jin-Il, Shunji Karube, Takahisa Yoshida, Bi Zhong and Zhang Lianbiao also became the Asian champion in their event. On the women's side, Wang Huei-Chen, Qu Yunxia and Min Chunfeng went on to add the 1994 Asian gold to their East Asian titles.

== Medal summary ==
=== Men ===
Event	Gold		Silver		Bronze	
100 metres Wind: 3.4m/s	Jin Sun-Kuk (KOR)	10.23 w	Lin Wei (CHN)	10.24 w	Chen Wenzhong (CHN)	10.25 w
200 metres Wind: 3.0 m/s	Zhao Cunlin (CHN)	20.99 w	Koji Ono (JPN)	21.19 w	Koji Ito (JPN)	21.19 w
400 metres	Yu Baoyi (CHN)	46.77	Xie Hong (CHN)	46.92	Koichi Konakatomi (JPN)	47.00
800 metres	Lee Jin-Il (KOR)	1:47.13	Kim Yong-Hwan (KOR)	1:48.75	Han Bo (CHN)	1:48.80
1500 metres	Kim Soon-Hyung (KOR)	3:56.17	Lin Jun (CHN)	3:56.18	Kim Bong-Yoo (KOR)	3:57.46
5000 metres	Yosuke Osawa (JPN)	13:47.61	Jun Hiratsuka (JPN)	13:51.67	Jiu Shangxuan (CHN)	13:54.09
10,000 metres	Nozomi Saho (JPN)	29:03.55	Tadashi Fukushima (JPN)	29:05.09	Ryu Ok-Hyon (PRK)	29:41.44
110 metre hurdles Wind: 2.4 m/s	Zheng Jinsuo (CHN)	13.77 w	Nobuaki Hoki (JPN)	13.88 w	Kimihiro Kaneko (JPN)	14.21 w
400 metre hurdles	Shunji Karube (JPN)	49.93	Gao Yonghong (CHN)	50.84	Du Yuechun (CHN)	51.03
3000 metre steeplechase	Akira Nakamura (JPN)	8:51.72	Sun Ripeng (CHN)	8:52.66	Niu Xinxiang (CHN)	9:04.54
4×100 metre relay	China (CHN)	39.36	Japan (JPN)	39.59	South Korea (KOR)	40.37
4×400 metre relay	China (CHN)	3:04.35	Japan (JPN)	3:05.99	North Korea (PRK)	3:26.75
20 km track walk	Chen Shaoguo (CHN)	1:21:29.1	Li Mingcai (CHN)	1:22:18.4	Tsutomu Takushima (JPN)	1:22:40.2
High jump	Takahisa Yoshida (JPN)	2.26 m	Lee Jin-Taek (KOR)	2.26 m	Xu Yang (CHN)	2.24 m
Pole vault	Ge Yun (CHN)	5.20 m	Takumi Takahashi (JPN)	5.10 m	Toshiyuki Hashioka (JPN)	5.10 m
Long jump	Nai Hui-Fang (TPE)	8.34 m	Nobuharu Asahara (JPN)	7.93 m	Zhou Ming (CHN)	7.84 m
Triple jump	Zou Sixin (CHN)	16.77 m w	Park Min-Soo (KOR)	16.58 m w	Chen Yanping (CHN)	16.53 m
Shot put	Ma Yongfeng (CHN)	19.50 m	Xie Shengying (CHN)	18.32 m	Lee Sung-Hoon (KOR)	17.12 m
Discus throw	Ma Wei (CHN)	57.18 m	Kim Yong-Nam (PRK)	51.56 m	Dashdendev Makhashiri (MGL)	49.72
Hammer throw	Bi Zhong (CHN)	74.60 m	Akiyoshi Ikeda (JPN)	67.62 m	Koji Murofushi (JPN)	66.78 m
Javelin throw	Zhang Lianbiao (CHN)	77.56 m	Chen Junlin (CHN)	75.02 m	Kim Ho-Kyum (KOR)	69.32 m
Decathlon	Munehiro Kaneko (JPN)	7995 pts	Cai Min (CHN)	7824 pts	Lee Fu-an (TPE)	7678 pts

=== Women ===
Event	Gold		Silver		Bronze	
100 metres Wind: 1.6m/s	Wang Huei-Chen (TPE)	11.38	Xiao Yehua (CHN)	11.56	Gao Han (CHN)	11.57
200 metres Wind: 2.0 m/s	Wang Huei-Chen (TPE)	23.47	Chen Zhaojing (CHN)	23.67	Han Qing (CHN)	23.76
400 metres	Len Xuiyan (CHN)	53.75	Hsu Pei-Ching (TPE)	54.97	Keiko Amano (JPN)	55.75
800 metres	Zhang Yumei (CHN)	2:01.68	Lü Yi (CHN)	2:03.38	Choi Ok-Soon (PRK)	2:08.03
1500 metres	Qu Yunxia (CHN)	4:04.42	Liu Dong (CHN)	4:07.25	Choi Ok-Soon (PRK)	4:14.76
3000 metres	Zhang Lirong (CHN)	8:40.30	Zhang Linli (CHN)	8:44.82	Junko Kataoka (JPN)	8:59.10
10,000 metres	Zhong Huandi (CHN)	32:32.37	Wang Xiuting (CHN)	32:36.29	Maiko Kawasaki (JPN)	33:20.94
100 metre hurdles Wind: −1.8 m/s	Zhang Yu (CHN)	13.23	Feng Yinghua (CHN)	13.31	Chan Sau Ying (HKG)	13.35
400 metre hurdles	Zhang Weimin (CHN)	56.21	Jiang Limei (CHN)	56.96	Hsu Pei-Ching (TPE)	59.08
4×100 metre relay	China (CHN)	44.23	Japan (JPN)	45.49	Only two finished	
4×400 metre relay	China (CHN)	3:33.41	Japan (JPN)	3:40.85	Only two finished	
10,000 m walk	Li Chunxiu (CHN)	45:00.32	Cui Yingzi (CHN)	46:08.07	Yuko Sato (JPN)	46:29.39
High jump	Wang Wei (CHN)	1.89 m	Fu Xiuhong (CHN)	1.87 m	Lin Su-Chi (TPE)	1.83 m
Long jump	Yang Juan (CHN)	6.45 m	Li Yong-Ae (PRK)	6.33 m	Wang Shu-Hwa (TPE)	6.15 m
Triple jump	Zhang Jing (CHN)	13.64 m	Li Yong-Ae (PRK)	13.25 m w	Yoko Morioka (JPN)	13.01 m
Shot put	Zhang Liuhong (CHN)	19.88 m	Li Xiaoyun (CHN)	18.17 m	Lee Myung-Sun (KOR)	15.99 m
Discus throw	Min Chunfeng (CHN)	63.12 m	Qiu Qiaoping (CHN)	55.50 m	Ikuko Kitamori (JPN)	49.90 m
Javelin throw Old model	Ha Xiaoyan (CHN)	64.52 m	Lee Young-Sun (KOR)	61.44 m	Zhao Yuhong (CHN)	60.12 m
Heptathlon	Zhu Yuqing (CHN)	6064 pts	Zhang Xiaohui (CHN)	5821 pts	Ma Chun-Ping (TPE)	5636 pts

== Medal table ==
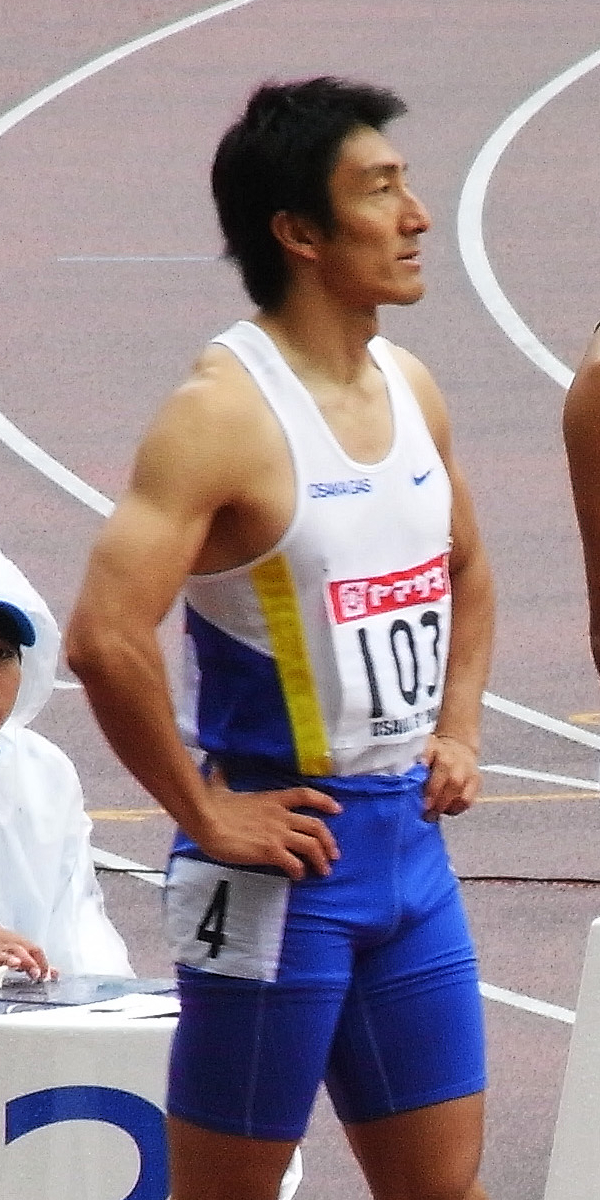
Japan's Nobuharu Asahara was the long jump silver medallist.

* Host nation (China)

Rank	Nation	Gold	Silver	Bronze	Total
1	China (CHN)*	29	22	11	62
2	Japan (JPN)	6	11	12	29
3	South Korea (KOR)	3	4	5	12
4	Chinese Taipei (TPE)	3	1	5	9
5	North Korea (PRK)	0	3	4	7
6	Hong Kong (HKG)	0	0	1	1
6	Mongolia (MGL)	0	0	1	1
8	Macau (MAC)	0	0	0	0
Totals (8 entries)		41	41	39	121

== See also ==
- 1993 in athletics (track and field)
