= Athletics at the 2001 National Games of China =

Athletics at the 9th National Games of China
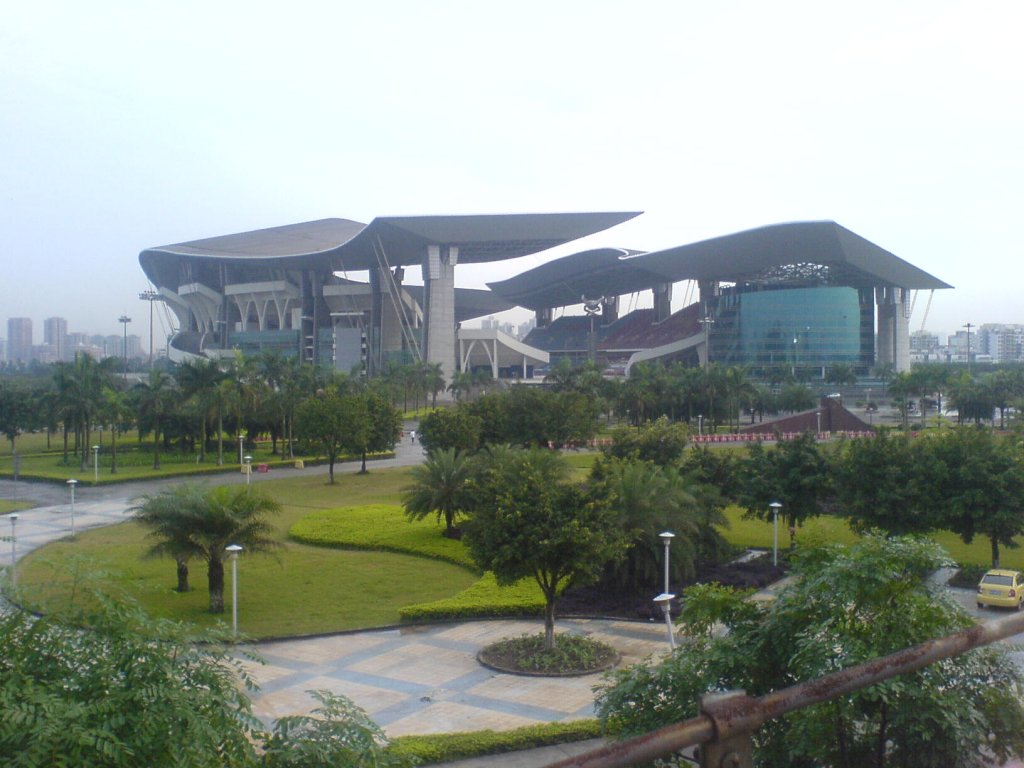
- The main stadium for the competition
- Dates: 17 – 23 November 2001
- Host city: Guangzhou, PR China
- Venue: Guangdong Olympic Stadium
- Events: 46
- Records set: Games records

At the 2001 National Games of China, the athletics events were held at the Guangdong Olympic Stadium in Guangzhou, Guangdong Province, PR China from 17 to 23 November 2001. A total of 46 events were contested, 24 by male and 22 by female athletes. The National Games marathon race was held before the main competition, as it was incorporated into that year's Beijing Marathon on 14 October.

== Medal summary ==
=== Men ===
Event	Gold		Silver		Bronze	
100 metres	Yin Hanzhao; Guangdong	10.25	Liu Yang; Guangdong	10.25	Wang Peng; Tianjin	10.28
200 metres	Xu Zizhou; Guangdong	20.60	Wang Hongzhen; Hebei	20.97	Yang Yaozu; Shanghai	21.01
400 metres	Xu Zizhou; Guangdong	45.72	Jiang Bo; Hubei	46.54	You Hanshan; Fujian	46.98
800 metres	Li Huiquan; Heilongjiang	1:49.09	Jiang Zhidong; Heilongjiang	1:50.15	Zeng Xiandong; Hebei	1:50.33
1500 metres	Yang Weize; Gansu	3:41.27	Dou Zhaobo; Shandong	3:44.01	Xing Shuai; Liaoning	3:44.08
5000 metres	Zheng Kai; Anhui	13:40.16	Kang Yanwei; Shaanxi	13:40.95	Li Zhuhong; Gansu	13:41.44
10,000 metres	Gong Ke; Liaoning	28:59.21	Zhao Haijun; Gansu	29:05.65	Liu Huyuan; Shaanxi	29:11.19
110 metres hurdles	Liu Xiang; Shanghai	13.36	Chen Yanhao; Shanghai	13.42	Shi Dongpeng; Hebei	13.49
400 metres hurdles	Tan Chunhua; Shanghai	49.85	Zhang Shibao; Fujian	50.33	Meng Yan; Jilin	50.46
3000 metres steeplechase	Sun Wenli; Shandong	8:36.25	Sun Jiawei; Jilin	8:38.85	Niu Xueren; Gansu	8:40.02
4×100 metres relay	Guangxi; Wen Jun; Yang Guangming; Lin Wei; Gong Wei	39.56	Hong Kong; To Wai Lok; Ho Kwan Lung; Tan Hong Sing; Chiang Wai Hung	39.95 NR	Shanghai; Zhang Feng; Zhang Yuan; Yang Yaozu; Liu Xiang	40.08
4×400 metres relay	Guangdong; Lu Bing; Han Chaoming; Li Zhijun; Xu Zizhou	3:06.27	Sichuan; Peng Yinggang; Li Qiang; Wang Lu; Zhang Yang	3:07.01	Fujian; Zhang Shibao; You Hanshan; Jiang Xuezhou; Zhuang Zhenping	3:07.28
Marathon	Gong Ke; Liaoning	2:10:11	Li Aiguo; Liaoning	2:10:25	Wang Yonghua; Guangdong	2:10:26
20 km walk	Li Zewen; Yunnan	1:20:49	Pei Chuang; Sichuan	1:20:58	Yu Chaohong; Yunnan	1:21:04
50 km walk	Wang Yinhang; Shandong	3:44:28	Yu Guoping; Liaoning	3:45:46	Yu Chaohong; Yunnan	3:47:04
High jump	Wang Zhouzhou; Shanghai	2.24 m	Zhou Zhongge; Beijing	2.24 m	Liang Tong; Beijing	2.24 m
Pole vault	Wu Yun; Shanghai	5.30 m	Chen Zhong; Guangdong	5.20 m	Liu Yingman; Guangdong	5.20 m
Long jump	Li Dalong; Guangdong	7.95 m	Huang Le; People's Liberation Army	7.88 m	Lao Jianfeng; Guangdong	7.86 m
Triple jump	Wu Ji; Hebei	17.04 m	Lao Jianfeng; Guangdong	16.68 m	Gu Junjie; Sichuan	16.46 m
Shot put	Wang Zhiyong; People's Liberation Army	19.00 m	Liu Hao; Beijing	18.80 m	Wen Jili; People's Liberation Army	18.58 m
Discus throw	Li Shaojie; Shandong	62.84 m	Nu Ermaimaiti; Xinjiang	62.36 m	Wu Tao; Liaoning	61.21 m
Hammer throw	Ye Kuigang; People's Liberation Army	73.04 m	Liu Fuxiang; Hainan	68.45 m	Bi Zhong; Jiangxi	67.40 m
Javelin throw	Li Rongxiang; Zhejiang	81.15 m	Zhang Lianbiao; Hunan	80.72 m	Sun Shipeng; Shanxi	78.51 m
Decathlon	Qi Haifeng; Liaoning	8021 pts	Zhao Lei; Jiangsu	7571 pts	Du Xiaopeng; People's Liberation Army	7480 pts

=== Women ===
Event	Gold		Silver		Bronze	
100 metres	Li Xuemei; Sichuan	11.14	Liu Xiaomei; Sichuan	11.22	Chen Yueqin; Hainan	11.42
200 metres	Li Xuemei; Sichuan	22.75	Liu Xiaomei; Sichuan	23.15	Chen Yuxiang; Shandong	23.35
400 metres	Bu Fanfang; Shandong	51.35	Chen Yuxiang; Shandong	51.40	Zhong Shaoting; Guangdong	52.24
800 metres	Lin Na; Liaoning	2:00.77	Wang Yuanping; Heilongjiang	2:01.05	Wang Yanchun; Heilongjiang	2:01.27
1500 metres	Lin Na; Liaoning	4:07.06	Liu Xiaoping; People's Liberation Army	4:07.31	Dong Yanmei; Liaoning	4:07.72
5000 metres	Dong Yanmei; Liaoning	14:51.58	Xing Huina; Shandong	14:56.15	Sun Yingjie; Railways	15:02.70
10,000 metres	Dong Yanmei; Liaoning	31:43.59	Sun Yingjie; Railways	31:49.47	Liu Min; Liaoning	31:53.78
100 metres hurdles	Su Yiping; Jiangsu	12.70	Feng Yun; Guangdong	12.86	Zeng Xiaoling; Hunan	12.91
400 metres hurdles	Song Yinglan; Hunan	53.96	Huang Xiaoxiao; Shandong	55.15	Yao Yuehua; Fujian	55.58
4×100 metres relay	Sichuan; Zeng Xiujun; Liu Xiaomei; Li Yali; Li Xuemei	43.18	Jiangsu; Jiang Zhiying; Ni Xiaoli; Zhang Hengyun; Liang Yi	44.23	Guangxi; Huang Nongfen; Yan Jiankui; Huang Mei; Ye Xiaoli	44.52
4×400 metres relay	Shandong; Huang Xiaoxiao; Bu Fanfang; Xiang Chirong; Chen Yuxiang	3:28.11	Guangdong; Zhou Wei; Gao Lihua; Li Xiashu; Zhong Shaoting	3:29.37	Jiangsu; Zheng Henghua; Zhu Yihong; Zhang Hengyun; Ni Xiaoli	3:32.37
Marathon	Liu Min; Liaoning	2:23:37	Wei Yanan; People's Liberation Army	2:24:02	Ren Xiujuan; Guangdong	2:24:22
20 km walk	Wang Yan; Liaoning	1:26:22	Wang Liping; Liaoning	1:26:23	Liu Hongyu; Liaoning	1:26:35
High jump	Jing Xuezhu; Beijing	1.90 m	Lu Jieming; Guangdong	1.87 m	Wang Wei; Shandong	1.84 m
Pole vault	Gao Shuying; Shanghai	4.31 m	Cai Weiyan; Anhui	4.11 m	Peng Xiaoming; Guangdong	4.01 m
Long jump	Gu Ying; Guangdong	6.57 m	Zhu Yanyan; Hunan	6.53 m	Wang Lina; Chongqing	6.51 m
Triple jump	Huang Qiuyan; Guangxi	14.72 m	Miao Chunqing; Shandong	14.43 m	Ren Ni; Hunan	14.29 m
Shot put	Li Meiju; Hebei	18.92 m	Cheng Xiaoyan; Shandong	18.78 m	Song Feina; Shanghai	18.73 m
Discus throw	Song Aimin; Hebei	62.34 m	Ma Shuli; Shandong	62.21 m	Luan Zhili; Shandong	62.20 m
Hammer throw	Gu Yuan; Shaanxi	66.97 m	Liu Yinghui; Chongqing	66.15 m	Li Xiaoxue; Jiangxi	63.90 m
Javelin throw	Tang Xiaoling; Hunan	59.95 m	Chu Chunxia; Jiangsu	59.85 m	Liang Lili; Shandong	59.82 m
Heptathlon	Shen Shengfei; Zhejiang	6263 pts	Wang Hailan; Hainan	5909 pts	Shi Wei; Guangdong	5891 pts
