= Athletics at the 1990 Asian Games =

- Venue: National Olympic Sports Centre
- Dates: 27 September – 3 October 1990

The athletics competition at the 1990 Asian Games was held at the National Olympic Sports Centre in Beijing, China from 27 September to 3 October.

Some English-language sources, such as GBR Athletics, erroneously state that South Korea's Kim Bok-joo was the winner of the men's 800 m and the 1500 m silver medallist. Contemporary English and Korean sources indicate it was his similarly-named teammate Kim Bong-yoo who achieved these feats.

== Medalists ==
=== Men ===
Event	Gold		Silver		Bronze	
100 m	Talal Mansour; Qatar	10.30 =GR	Zheng Chen; China	10.51	Sriyantha Dissanayake; Sri Lanka	10.64
200 m	Susumu Takano; Japan	20.94	Sriyantha Dissanayake; Sri Lanka	21.17	Zhao Cunlin; China	21.28
400 m	Mohammed Al-Malki; Oman	45.81	Ibrahim Ismail Muftah; Qatar	46.09	Koichi Konakatomi; Japan	46.85
800 m	Kim Bong-yoo; South Korea	1:49.58	Ryu Tae-kyung; South Korea	1:50.00	Nadir Khan; Pakistan	1:50.01
1500 m	Mohamed Suleiman; Qatar	3:43.56	Kim Bong-yoo; South Korea	3:45.04	Mitsuhiro Okuyama; Japan	3:45.53
5000 m	Mohamed Suleiman; Qatar	13:50.22; GR	Koichi Morishita; Japan	13:50.23	Zhang Guowei; China	13:52.12
10,000 m	Koichi Morishita; Japan	28:47.96	Kim Jae-ryong; South Korea	28:49.61	Zhang Guowei; China	29:01.13
110 m hurdles	Yu Zhicheng; China	13.82; GR	Toshihiko Iwasaki; Japan	14.11	Kimihiro Kaneko; Japan	14.21
400 m hurdles	Ghulam Abbas; Pakistan	50.15	Hwang Hong-chul; South Korea	50.24	Gao Yonghong; China	50.47
3000 m steeplechase	Kazuhito Yamada; Japan	8:34.64; GR	Deena Ram; India	8:35.19	Niu Xinxiang; China	8:35.19
4 × 100 m relay	China; Wu Jianhui; Cai Jianming; Zhao Cunlin; Zheng Chen	38.99; GR	Chinese Taipei; Lai Cheng-chuan; Lin Ching-hsiung; Cheng Hsin-fu; Hsieh Tzong-tze	39.27	Japan; Hisatsugu Suzuki; Susumu Takano; Yuji Mochizuki; Katsutoshi Iwasa	39.61
4 × 400 m relay	Japan; Koichi Konakatomi; Katsutoshi Iwasa; Yoji Mochizuki; Takahiro Watanabe	3:05.82	Qatar; Sami Al-Abdullah; Nasser Ahmed; Ibrahim Ismail Muftah; Ismail Mohamed Youssef	3:09.96	China; Liang Bohua; Tan Guoheng; Chen Jingzhong; Yu Baoyi	3:10.03
Marathon	Kim Won-tak; South Korea	2:12:56	Satoru Shimizu; Japan	2:14:46	Choi Chol-ho; North Korea	2:18:18
20 km walk	Mao Xinyuan; China	1:23:16	Hirofumi Sakai; Japan	1:23:17	Li Mingcai; China	1:25:08
50 km walk	Zhou Zhaowen; China	4:08:33; GR	Zhai Wanbo; China	4:10:17	Tadahiro Kosaka; Japan	4:16:59
High jump	Zhou Zhongge; China	2.26	Liu Yunpeng; China	2.20	Takahisa Yoshida; Japan	2.15
High jump	Zhou Zhongge; China	2.26	Liu Yunpeng; China	2.20	Cho Hyun-wook; South Korea	2.15
High jump	Zhou Zhongge; China	2.26	Liu Yunpeng; China	2.20	Liao Hsueh-sung; Chinese Taipei	2.15
High jump	Zhou Zhongge; China	2.26	Liu Yunpeng; China	2.20	Abdullah Al-Sheib; Qatar	2.15
Pole vault	Liang Xueren; China	5.62; GR	Ge Yun; China	5.40	Kim Chul-kyun; South Korea	5.40
Long jump	Chen Zunrong; China	8.04	Huang Geng; China	7.86	Lai Cheng-chuan; Chinese Taipei	7.73
Triple jump	Chen Yanping; China	17.51	Zou Sixin; China	17.31; GR	Ryu Jae-kyun; South Korea	16.32
Shot put	Cheng Shaobo; China	18.89; GR	Ma Yongfeng; China	18.81	S. D. Eashan; India	17.32
Discus throw	Zhang Jinglong; China	61.18; GR	Wang Daoming; China	55.90	Mansour Ghorbani; Iran	52.70
Hammer throw	Bi Zhong; China	71.30; GR	Yu Guangming; China	69.84	Akiyoshi Ikeda; Japan	66.52
Javelin throw	Masami Yoshida; Japan	77.26; GR	Kim Ki-hoon; South Korea	75.86	Kazuhiro Mizoguchi; Japan	75.84
Decathlon	Munehiro Kaneko; Japan	7799; GR	Guu Jin-shoei; Chinese Taipei	7623	Gong Guohua; China	7453

=== Women ===
Event	Gold		Silver		Bronze	
100 m	Tian Yumei; China	11.80	Wang Huei-chen; Chinese Taipei	12.09	Lee Young-sook; South Korea	12.10
200 m	Han Qing; China	23.42; GR	Wang Huei-chen; Chinese Taipei	23.89	Tian Yumei; China	24.01
400 m	Li Guilian; China	52.13; GR	P. T. Usha; India	52.86	Li Wenhong; China	53.20
800 m	Li Wenhong; China	2:01.04; GR	Zheng Lijuan; China	2:01.53	Rosa Kutty; India	2:04.05
1500 m	Zheng Lijuan; China	4:23.11	Jiang Shuling; China	4:23.97	Khin Khin Htwe; Myanmar	4:25.03
3000 m	Zhong Huandi; China	8:57.12; GR	Kim Chun-mae; North Korea	8:57.63	Wang Huabi; China	8:59.00
10,000 m	Zhong Huandi; China	31:50.98; GR	Wang Xiuting; China	31:52.18	Akemi Matsuno; Japan	31:56.93
100 m hurdles	Liu Huajin; China	12.73; GR	Luo Bin; China	12.97	Chizuko Akimoto; Japan	13.81
400 m hurdles	Chen Juying; China	56.05; GR	Chen Dongmei; China	56.89	Elma Muros; Philippines	59.47
4 × 100 m relay	China; Huang Xiaoyan; Tian Yumei; Wang Ping; Zhang Caihua	44.36; GR	India; Zenia Ayrton; Ashwini Nachappa; Kutty Saramma; P. T. Usha	44.99	Thailand; Nednapa Chommuak; Reawadee Srithoa; Ratjai Sripet; Pronpim Srisurat	45.24
4 × 400 m relay	China; Li Guilian; Chen Juying; Zhou Qing; Li Wenhong	3:33.57; GR	India; Pranati Mishra; Shantimol Philips; Kutty Saramma; P. T. Usha	3:38.45	Malaysia; Rabia Abdul Salam; Sajaratuldur Hamzah; Shanti Govindasamy; Josephine Mary Singarayar	3:38.52
Marathon	Zhao Youfeng; China	2:35:19; GR	Kumi Araki; Japan	2:35:34	Lee Mi-ok; South Korea	2:36:31
10 km walk	Chen Yueling; China	44:47; GR	Jin Bingjie; China	46:57	Fusako Masuda; Japan	47:09
High jump	Megumi Sato; Japan	1.94; GR	Kim Hee-sun; South Korea	1.90	Shared silver	
High jump	Megumi Sato; Japan	1.94; GR	Cao Zhongping; China	1.90	Shared silver	
Long jump	Xiong Qiying; China	6.69; GR	Liu Shuzhen; China	6.64	Ri Yong-ae; North Korea	6.51
Shot put	Sui Xinmei; China	20.55; GR	Huang Zhihong; China	20.46	Chong Chun-hwa; North Korea	14.61
Discus throw	Hou Xuemei; China	63.56; GR	Yu Hourun; China	62.60	Ikuko Kitamori; Japan	53.82
Javelin throw	Zhang Li; China	66.00; GR	Xu Demei; China	61.92	Emi Matsui; Japan	56.04
Heptathlon	Ma Miaolan; China	6231; GR	Dong Yuping; China	5355	Ma Chun-ping; Chinese Taipei	5213

== Medal table ==
Rank	Nation	Gold	Silver	Bronze	Total
1	China (CHN)	29	21	11	61
2	Japan (JPN)	7	5	13	25
3	Qatar (QAT)	3	2	1	6
4	South Korea (KOR)	2	6	5	13
5	Pakistan (PAK)	1	0	1	2
6	Oman (OMA)	1	0	0	1
7	Chinese Taipei (TPE)	0	4	3	7
8	India (IND)	0	4	2	6
9	North Korea (PRK)	0	1	3	4
10	Sri Lanka (SRI)	0	1	1	2
11	Iran (IRN)	0	0	1	1
11	Malaysia (MAL)	0	0	1	1
11	Myanmar (MYA)	0	0	1	1
11	Philippines (PHI)	0	0	1	1
11	Thailand (THA)	0	0	1	1
Totals (15 entries)		43	44	45	132
