= Wen Zhong (disambiguation) =

Wen Zhong was an advisor in the state of Yue in the Spring and Autumn period

Wen Zhong or Wenzhong may also refer to:

- Wen Zhong (Investiture of the Gods), a fictional character
- Wenzhong Chen (born 1970), a former Chinese sprinter

== See also ==
- Wenzong (disambiguation)
- Wen Zhang
