= Pranati =

- Gender: Female
- Language: Sanskrit

Origin
- Meaning: "salutation" "reverence"
- Region of origin: India

Pranathi is a Hindu/Sanskrit Indian feminine given name, which means "salutation" or "reverence" . It may refer to:

- Pranati Deka, ULFA activist
- Pranati Mishra, Indian athlete
- Pranati Rai Prakash, Indian model, actor, singer
- Pariva Pranati, Indian actress
