= Zhang Guowei =

Zhang Guowei may refer to:

- Zhang Guowei (runner) (born 1959), Chinese long-distance runner
- Zhang Guowei (high jumper) (born 1991), Chinese high jumper
