= Athletics at the 1997 East Asian Games =

Athletics at the 2nd East Asian Games
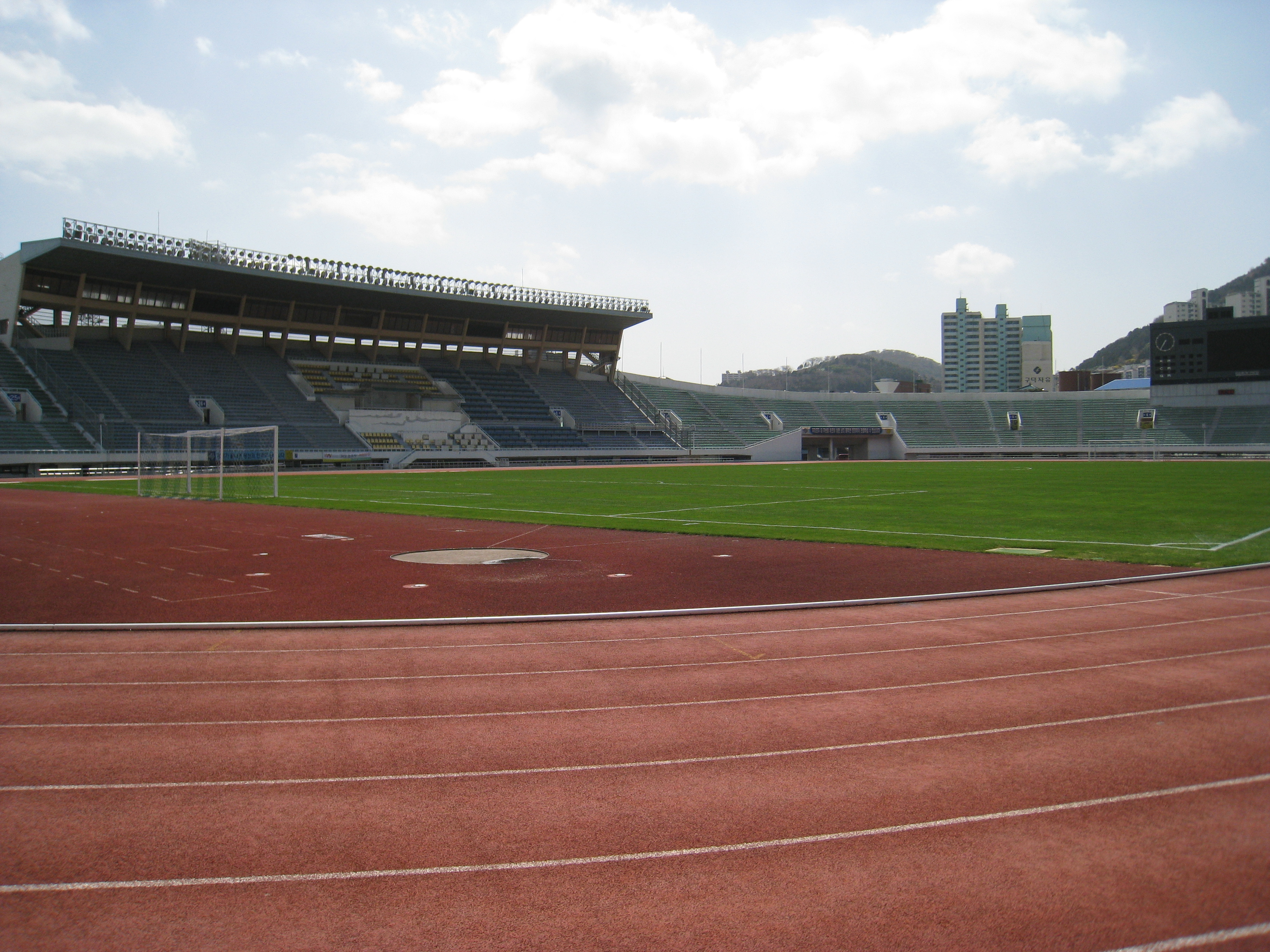
- Host stadium in Busan
- Dates: 10–19 May
- Host city: Busan, South Korea
- Venue: Busan Gudeok Stadium
- Level: Senior
- Events: 43
- Participation: ? athletes from 9 nations

At the 1997 East Asian Games, the athletics events were held at the Busan Gudeok Stadium in Busan, South Korea from 10 to 19 May. Forty-three events were contested, 23 by male and 20 by female athletes.

In terms of country performance the competition was a closely contested affair between Japan, which dominated the men's events, and China which led in the women's proceedings. Both finished with a total of 16 gold medals, but China's strength in depth showed in the minor medals as it took a medal haul of 52 (ten more than Japan). Kazakhstan took the third-most gold medals with seven, while the hosts (South Korea) won 18 medals to be the third-best medalling team, although this was one of their weaker sports.

In terms of athletes, Minori Hayakari provided a boost to Japan by winning silver in the 800 metres and a bronze in the 1500 metres event. Wang Zhicheng of China also won two individual medals: a 5000 metres silver, and 10,000 metres bronze. A number of athletes went on to further success at the 1998 Asian Games: Japan's Koji Ito and Koji Murofushi won gold in their events, and China had particular success with their field eventers as Ren Ruiping, Li Meisu and Li Shaojie all took Asian Games gold medals.

== Medal summary ==
=== Men ===
Event	Gold		Silver		Bronze	
100 metres Wind: 4.0 m/s	Nobuharu Asahara (JPN)	10.04 w	Lin Wei (CHN)	10.30 w	Hideki Onohara (JPN)	10.36 w
200 metres	Koji Ito (JPN)	20.98 GR	Huang Danwei (CHN)	21.05	Han Chaoming (CHN)	21.23
400 metres	Son Ju-Il (KOR)	45.84 GR	Shunji Karube (JPN)	46.08	Shigekazu Ōmori (JPN)	46.50
800 metres	Kim Soon-Hyung (KOR)	1:49.00	Lee Jae-Hun (KOR)	1:50.75	Zhang Yi (CHN)	1:50.76
1500 metres	Kiyonari Shibata (JPN)	3:49.90 GR	Liu Lijun (CHN)	3:49.97	Kim Soon-Hyung (KOR)	3:51.18
5000 metres	Yuichi Tajiri (JPN)	13:55.84	Wang Zhicheng (CHN)	14:03.62	Kim Seong-Ho (KOR)	14:22.96
10,000 metres	Toshinari Takaoka (JPN)	28:44.60 GR	Kenji Takao (JPN)	29:29.08	Wang Zhicheng (CHN)	29:49.54
110 metre hurdles	Li Tong (CHN)	13.67 GR	Chen Yanhao (CHN)	13.70	Hisanobu Konae (JPN)	13.85
400 metre hurdles	Kazuhiko Yamazaki (JPN)	49.60 GR	Yoshihiko Saito (JPN)	50.41	Tan Chunhua (CHN)	50.73
3000 metre steeplechase	Yasunori Uchitomi (JPN)	8:39.28 GR	Wataru Izumi (JPN)	8:45.38	Qin Gang (CHN)	8:54.16
4×100 metre relay	Japan (JPN)	39.32 GR	China (CHN)	39.43	Chinese Taipei (TPE)	40.31
4×400 metre relay	Japan (JPN)	3:04.35 =GR	South Korea (KOR)	3:09.11	Chinese Taipei (TPE)	3:09.77
Half marathon	Kokichi Kawamoto (JPN)	1:07:06	Je In-Mo (KOR)	1:07:16	Ko Jung-Won (KOR)	1:08:17
20 km track walk	Jiao Baozhong (CHN)	1:23:58.59	Daisuke Ikeshima (JPN)	1:23:59.99	Hirofumi Sakai (JPN)	1:27:39.38
High jump	Lee Jin-Taek (KOR)	2.28 m GR	Kim Tae-Hoi (KOR)	2.24 m	Takahisa Yoshida (JPN)	2.24 m
Pole vault	Aleksandr Korchagin (KAZ)	5.50 m GR	Kim Chul-Kyun (KOR)	5.40 m	Xu Gang (CHN)	5.40 m
Long jump	Masaki Morinaga (JPN)	8.13 m	Huang Geng (CHN)	8.03 m w	Chen Jing (CHN)	7.92 m
Triple jump	Sergey Arzamasov (KAZ)	16.89 m GR	Lao Jianfeng (CHN)	16.71 m	Takashi Komatsu (JPN)	16.39 m
Shot put	Sergey Rubtsov (KAZ)	19.47 m	Wen Jili (CHN)	18.57 m	Li Wenkui (CHN)	18.28 m
Discus throw	Li Shaojie (CHN)	62.58 m GR	Zhang Cunbiao (CHN)	60.42 m	Dashdendev Makhashiri (MGL)	60.14 m
Hammer throw	Koji Murofushi (JPN)	73.40 m	Ye Kuigang (CHN)	69.56 m	Bi Zhong (CHN)	68.68 m
Javelin throw	Zhang Lianbiao (CHN)	77.80 m GR	Toro Ue (JPN)	73.74 m	Kim Ki-Hun (KOR)	72.42 m
Decathlon	Kim Tae-Keun (KOR)	7372 pts	Chen Chien-Hung (TPE)	7103 pts	Choi Sung-Shin (KOR)	7045 pts

=== Women ===
Event	Gold		Silver		Bronze	
100 metres Wind: 2.5 m/s	Liang Yi (CHN)	11.46 w	Kaori Yoshida (JPN)	11.49 w	Yue Ling (CHN)	11.55 w
200 metres	Yan Jiankui (CHN)	23.44 GR	Chen Yuxiang (CHN)	23.82	Motoko Arai (JPN)	24.09
400 metres	Svetlana Bodritskaya (KAZ)	52.92 GR	Du Xiujie (CHN)	53.48	Satomi Kasashima (JPN)	54.17
800 metres	Zhang Jian (CHN)	2:06.16	Minori Hayakari (JPN)	2:07.65	Zhang Jinqing (CHN)	2:10.05
1500 metres	Liu Jianying (CHN)	4:19.36	Yoshiko Ichikawa (JPN)	4:19.80	Minori Hayakari (JPN)	4:21.37
5000 metres	Harumi Hiroyama (JPN)	15:37.53 GR	Wei Li (CHN)	15:38.73	Wang Mingxia (CHN)	15:46.88
10,000 metres	Masako Chiba (JPN)	31:31.85 GR	Wang Mingxia (CHN)	32:47.20	Yuko Kawakami (JPN)	33:02.25
100 metre hurdles	Yvonne Kanazawa (JPN)	13.16 GR	Chan Sau Ying (HKG)	13.29	Liu Jing (CHN)	13.31
400 metre hurdles	Natalya Torshina (KAZ)	55.90 GR	Hsu Pei-Ching (TPE)	58.00	Li Rui (CHN)	58.06
4×100 metre relay	China (CHN)	45.05	Japan (JPN)	45.16	Chinese Taipei (TPE)	45.52
4×400 metre relay	China (CHN)	3:35.27	Japan (JPN)	3:36.60	South Korea (KOR)	3:54.05
Half marathon	Zheng Guixia (CHN)	1:14:19 GR	Sachie Ozaki (JPN)	1:14:22	Naomi Sakashita (JPN)	1:14:31
10,000 m track walk	Yuka Mitsumori (JPN)	46:23.25	Svetlana Tolstaya (KAZ)	47:08.09	Feng Haixia (CHN)	47:20.49
High jump	Jin Ling (CHN)	1.91 m GR	Svetlana Zalevskaya (KAZ)	1.88 m	Miki Imai (JPN)	1.88 m
Long jump	Yelena Pershina (KAZ)	6.59 m GR	Yu Yiqin (CHN)	6.42 m	Zhang Hongling (CHN)	6.25 m
Triple jump	Ren Ruiping (CHN)	14.47 m GR	Li Jiahui (CHN)	13.50 m	Seiko Nishiuchi (JPN)	13.13 m
Shot put	Li Meisu (CHN)	19.07 m	Sui Xinmei (CHN)	18.26 m	Lee Myung-Sun (KOR)	17.56 m
Discus throw	Xiao Yanling (CHN)	63.82 m GR	Luan Zhili (CHN)	61.94 m	Yuka Murofushi (JPN)	51.90 m
Javelin throw	Li Lei (CHN)	56.92 m	Lee Young-Sun (KOR)	56.10 m	Jang Jeong-Yeon (KOR)	51.06 m
Heptathlon	Svetlana Kazanina (KAZ)	5971 pts	Ma Chun-Ping (TPE)	5737 pts	Wang Xiuyan (CHN)	5560 pts

== Medal table ==
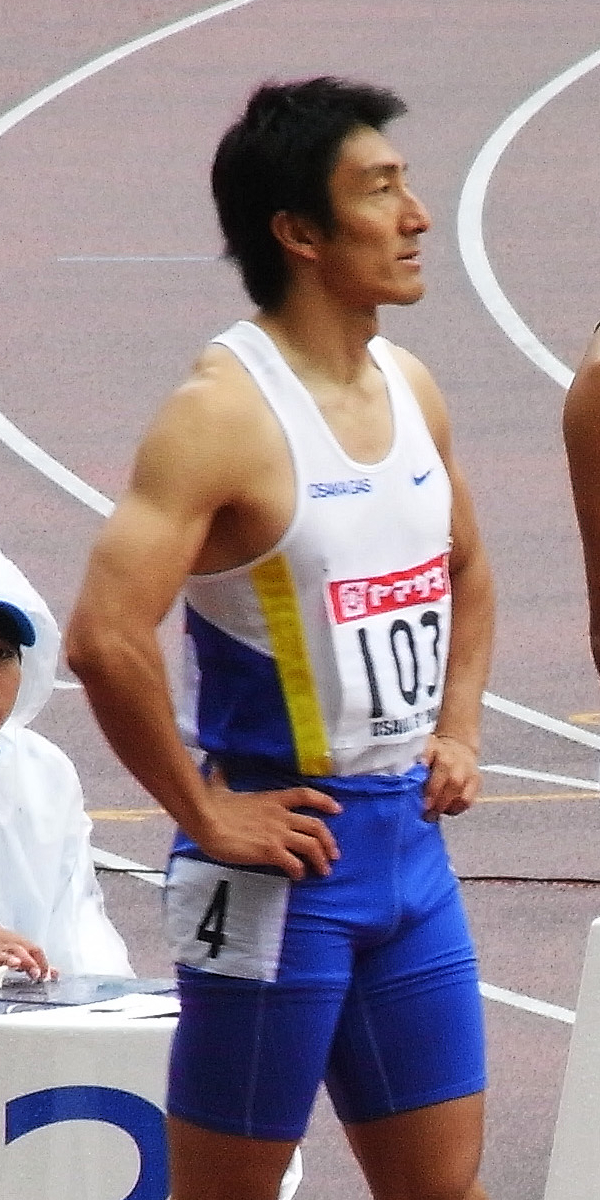
Japan's Nobuharu Asahara won the 100 m gold.

* Host nation (South Korea)

Rank	Nation	Gold	Silver	Bronze	Total
1	China (CHN)	16	19	17	52
2	Japan (JPN)	16	12	14	42
3	Kazakhstan (KAZ)	7	2	0	9
4	South Korea (KOR)*	4	6	8	18
5	Chinese Taipei (TPE)	0	3	3	6
6	Hong Kong (HKG)	0	1	0	1
7	Mongolia (MGL)	0	0	1	1
8	Guam (GUM)	0	0	0	0
8	Macau (MAC)	0	0	0	0
Totals (9 entries)		43	43	43	129
