= Kim Ki-hoon (athlete) =

South Korean javelin thrower (born 1968)

Medal record

Men's athletics

Representing South Korea

Asian Championships
Bronze medal – third place	1991 Kuala Lumpur	Javelin throw

Kim Ki-Hun (born 27 May 1968) is a retired South Korean javelin thrower.

He won the silver medal at the 1990 Asian Games, the bronze medal at the 1991 Asian Championships and the gold medal at the 1997 East Asian Games. He also competed at the 1991 World Championships, the 1992 Olympic Games and the 1995 World Championships without reaching the final.

His personal best time was 79.08 metres, achieved in April 1992.
