= Munjong =

Munjong (Korean: 문종; Hanja: 文宗) is a temple name of several Korean monarchs, derived from the Chinese equivalent Wénzōng. It may refer to:

- Munjong of Goryeo (r.1046-1083), king of Korea
- Munjong of Joseon (r.1450-1452), king of Korea

== See also ==
- Wenzong (disambiguation) (Chinese romanization)
