= Wang Mingxia =

Chinese long-distance runner

Medal record

Women's athletics

Representing China

East Asian Games
Silver medal – second place	1997 Busan	10,000 metres
Bronze medal – third place	1997 Busan	5000 metres

Wang Mingxia (Chinese: 王明霞; born 21 July 1971) is a retired Chinese long-distance runner.

She finished 15th in the 10,000 metres at the 1996 Olympic Games, and at the 1997 East Asian Games she won a silver medal in the same event as well as a bronze medal in the 5000 metres.

Her personal best time was 31:12.58 minutes, achieved in 1997.
