= Zhang Li (javelin thrower, born 1961) =

Chinese javelin thrower

Personal information
- Born: 26 June 1961 (age 65) Tianjin, China

Sport
- Sport: Track and field
Medal record
Representing China
Asian Championships
Gold medal – first place	1993 Manila	Javelin throw
Asian Games
Gold medal – first place	1990 Beijing	Javelin throw

Zhang Li (Chinese: 张丽; pinyin: Zhāng Lì; born 26 June 1961) is a former track and field athlete from China, who competed for her native country in the women's javelin throw event. She was a gold medallist at the 1990 Asian Games and the 1993 Asian Athletics Championships. Her winning throw of 66.00 m (216 ft 6 1/4 in) at the former event was a Games record and remains the best mark using the old javelin design.

Zhang twice competed for Asia at the IAAF World Cup and was a silver medallist in 1989. She represented her home area of Tianjin at the 1993 National Games of China and was runner-up to Ha Xiaoyan.

== International competitions ==
Representing China
Year	Competition	Venue	Position	Notes
1989	IAAF World Cup	Barcelona, Spain	2nd	61.50 m
1990	Asian Games	Beijing, China	1st	66.00 m
1993	Asian Championships	Manila, Philippines	1st	62.14 m
1994	IAAF World Cup	London, United Kingdom	4th	58.82 m
