= Li Rui (hurdler) =

Chinese hurdler (born 1979)

Medal record

Women's athletics

Representing China

Asian Championships
| Gold medal – first place | 1998 Fukuoka | 400 m hurdles |
| Gold medal – first place | 1998 Fukuoka | 4×400 m |

Li Rui (Chinese: 李蕊; pinyin: Lǐ Ruǐ; born 22 November 1979) is a retired female hurdler from PR China. She won the gold medal at the 1998 Asian Championships, in a career best time of 55.80 seconds. She finished seventh at the 1998 World Cup.

== Achievements ==
| Year | Competition | Venue | Position | Notes |
Representing China
| 1997 | East Asian Games | Busan, South Korea | 3rd | 400m h |
| 1998 | Asian Championships | Fukuoka, Japan | 1st | 400m h |
