= Kim Bong-yoo =

South Korean runner (born 1967)

Personal information
- Nationality: South Korean
- Born: 16 June 1967 (age 59) Pyeongchang, Gangwon, South Korea

Sport
- Sport: Middle-distance running
- Events: 800 metres, 1500 metres
Medal record
Men's athletics
Representing South Korea
Asian Games
Gold medal – first place	1990 Beijing	800 m
Silver medal – second place	1990 Beijing	1500 m
Asian Championships
Silver medal – second place	1991 Kuala Lumpur	1500 m

Kim Bong-yoo (Korean: 김봉유; Hanja: 金奉猷; born 16 June 1967) is a South Korean middle-distance runner. He competed in the men's 1500 metres at the 1992 Summer Olympics. He holds the South Korean national record for the indoor 1500 metres with his best of 3:47.95 minutes. He was the bronze medalist at the 1993 East Asian Games behind teammate Kim Soon-hyung and China's Lin Jun.

He was the 1990 Asian Games gold medallist in the 800 m and a silver medalist in the 1500 m. At the 1991 Asian Athletics Championships he was the 1500 m silver medallist behind Mohamed Suleiman.

== Notes ==
- Some English-language sources, such as GBR Athletics, erroneously state that Kim Bok-joo was winner of the 1990 Asian Games men's 800 m and the 1500 m silver medallist, as well as the 1991 Asian Championships runner-up. Contemporary English and Korean sources indicate it was his similarly-named teammate Kim Bong-yoo who achieved these feats.
