= 1998 Asian Athletics Championships =

1998 Asian Championships
- Dates: July 19–22
- Host city: Fukuoka, Japan
- Venue: Hakatanomori Athletic Stadium
- Participation: at least 16 nations

The 12th Asian Championships in Athletics were held in Fukuoka, Japan in July 1998.

== Medal summary ==
=== Men ===
Event	Gold		Silver		Bronze	
100 m (wind: -0.6 m/s)	Zhou Wei; China	10.39	Watson Nyambek; Malaysia	10.42	Hiroyasu Tsuchie; Japan	10.44
200 m (wind: -0.6 m/s)	Koji Ito; Japan	20.70	Han Chaoming; China	20.77	Gennadiy Chernovol; Kazakhstan	20.92
400 m	Sugath Tillakaratne; Sri Lanka	44.61 CR	Masayoshi Kan; Japan	45.64	Kenji Tabata; Japan	45.69
800 m	Cheng Bing; China	1:47.71	Abdulhassan Abdulrahman; Qatar	1:47.74	Mahmoud Al-Kheirat; Syria	1:48.16
1500 m	Mohammed Sulaiman; Qatar	3:43.70	Kiyonari Shibata; Japan	3:44.38	Cheng Bing; China	3:44.92
5000 m	Toshinari Takaoka; Japan	13:54.34	Gulab Chand; India	13:55.40	Ahmed Ibrahim Warsama; Qatar	13:58.35
10,000 m	Baek Seung-do; South Korea	30:12.26	Toshihiro Iwasa; Japan	30:12.57	Gulab Chand; India	30:14.69
3000 m St.	Saad Shadad Al-Asmari; Saudi Arabia	8:31.13	Yasunori Uchitomi; Japan	8:33.40	Hamid Sajjadi; Iran	8:37.88
110 m H (wind: +1.9 m/s)	Chen Yanhao; China	13.53 CR	Qi Zhen; China	13.74	Andrey Sklyarenko; Kazakhstan	13.86
400 m H	Mubarak Al-Nubi; Qatar	48.71 CR	Hideaki Kawamura; Japan	49.69	Kazuhiko Yamazaki; Japan	49.81
20 km Walk	Li Zewen; China	1:27:58	Yoshima Hara; Japan	1:28:16	Valeriy Borisov; Kazakhstan	1:29:05
4 x 100 m	China; Zhou Wei; Lin Wei; Yin Hanzhao; Han Chaoming	39.03	Japan; Tatsuhiko Watanabe; Tatsuo Sugimoto; Hiroyasu Tsuchie; Koji Ito	39.30	Qatar; Jamal Abbas; Hamed Al-Dosari; Jamal Suleiman; Saad Mubarak	39.43
4 x 400 m	Japan; Kenji Tabata; Jun Osakada; Shunji Karube; Masayoshi Kan	3:02.61	South Korea; Kim Jae-da; Shon Ju-il; Kim Ho; Kim Yong-hwan	3:04.44 NR	Sri Lanka; Ranga Wimalawansa; Vellasamy Ratnakumara; Rohan Pradeep Kumara; Sugath Thilakaratne	3:05.79
High jump	Zhou Zhongge; China	2.30	Lee Jin-taek; South Korea	2.27	Loo Kum Zee; Malaysia	2.23
Pole vault	Igor Potapovich; Kazakhstan	5.55	Aleksandr Korchagin; Kazakhstan	5.40	Hideji Suzuki; Japan	5.20
Long jump	Masaki Morinaga; Japan	8.08	Liu Hongning; China	7.97	Shigeru Tagawa; Japan	7.96
Triple jump	Duan Qifeng; China	16.79	Takanori Sugibayashi; Japan	16.50	Takashi Komatsu; Japan	16.38
Shot put	Bilal Saad Mubarak; Qatar	19.17 CR	Liu Hao; China	18.86	Shakti Singh; India	18.40
Discus	Li Shaojie; China	60.28	Dashdendev Makhashiri; Mongolia	57.00	Ajit Bhaduria; India	55.46
Hammer	Andrey Abduvaliyev; Uzbekistan	76.67 CR	Koji Murofushi; Japan	74.17	Nikolay Davydov; Kyrgyzstan	70.31
Javelin	Zhang Lianbiao; China	77.61	Li Rongxiang; China	77.48	Mikio Tamura; Japan	75.71
Decathlon	Toru Yasui; Japan	7439 pts CR	Tomokazu Sugama; Japan	7347 pts	Ivan Yarkin; Kazakhstan	7239 pts
WR world record | AR area record | CR championship record | GR games record | NR national record | OR Olympic record | PB personal best | SB season best | WL world leading (in a given season)

=== Women ===
Event	Gold		Silver		Bronze	
100 m (wind: -0.1 m/s)	Yan Jiankui; China	11.39	Cui Dangfeng; China	11.42	Shanti Govindasamy; Malaysia	11.60
200 m (wind: +1.7 m/s)	Yan Jiankui; China	23.00 =CR	Huang Mei; China	23.21	P.T. Usha; India	23.27
400 m	Damayanthi Dharsha; Sri Lanka	51.23 =CR	Svetlana Bodritskaya; Kazakhstan	52.46	P.T. Usha; India	52.55
800 m	Zhang Jian; China	2:01.16 CR	Liu Jing; China	2:01.85	Jyotirmoy Sikdar; India	2:02.65
1500 m	Liu Jing; China	4:12.76 CR	Wang Chunmei; China	4:13.45	Jyotirmoy Sikdar; India	4:14.32
5000 m	Wang Chunmei; China	15:49.48	Liu Shixiang; China	15:53.76	Megumi Tanaka; Japan	15:55.10
10,000 m	Liu Shixiang; China	32:28.49	Chiemi Takahashi; Japan	32:32.99	Aki Fujikawa; Japan	32:48.05
100 m H (wind: -0.9 m/s)	Olga Shishigina; Kazakhstan	13.04 CR	Feng Yun; China	13.10	Sriyani Kulawansa; Sri Lanka	13.16
400 m H	Li Rui; China	55.80 CR	Natalya Torshina; Kazakhstan	56.34	Hsu Pei-Ching; Chinese Taipei	57.09
10,000 m road walk	Li Yuxin; China	46:41	Rie Mitsumori; Japan	46:42	Yuka Mitsumori; Japan	47:01
4 x 100 m	India; P. T. Usha; Rachita Mistry; E. B. Shyla; Saraswati Dey	44.43	Japan; Kaori Yoshida; Yuka Fujii; Asami Nagashima; Motoka Arai	44.45	Thailand; Reawadee Srithoa-Watanasin; Naparat Suajongprue; Savitree Srichure; Supawadee Khawpeag	44.85
4 x 400 m	China; Huang Mei; Li Jing; Chen Yuxiang; Li Rui	3:33.48	India; M.K. Asha; Rosa Kutty; Jyotirmoyee Sikdar; P.T. Usha	3:34.04	Japan; Sachiko Kiso; Kazue Kakinuma; Sakie Nobuoka; Satomi Kasashima	3:35.71
High jump	Miki Imai; Japan	1.94 CR	Yoko Ota; Japan	1.91	Jin Ling; China	1.88
Pole vault	Peng Xiaoming; China	4.00 CR	Masumi Ono; Japan	3.80	Chie Miyoshi; Japan	3.70
Long jump	Guan Yingnan; China	6.83 CR	Yu Yiqun; China	6.74	Yelena Pershina; Kazakhstan	6.50w
Triple jump	Ren Ruiping; China	14.11 CR	Wang Kuo-Huei; Chinese Taipei	13.30	Maho Hanaoka; Japan	13.24
Shot put	Li Meisu; China	18.63	Yu Juan; China	18.12	Lee Myung-Sun; South Korea	17.66
Discus	Yu Xin; China	57.47	Neelam Jaswant Singh; India	56.81	Xiao Yanling; China	53.32
Hammer	Gu Yuan; China	61.86	Aya Suzuki; Japan	56.12	Eriko Kubota; Japan	48.48
Javelin	Li Lei; China	60.12	Harumi Yamamoto; Japan	55.41	Gurmeet Kaur; India	55.35
Heptathlon	Ding Ying; China	5846 pts	Svetlana Kazanina; Kazakhstan	5779 pts	Ma Chun-Ping; Chinese Taipei	5489 pts
WR world record | AR area record | CR championship record | GR games record | NR national record | OR Olympic record | PB personal best | SB season best | WL world leading (in a given season)

== Medal table ==
* Host nation (Japan)

Rank	Nation	Gold	Silver	Bronze	Total
1	China (CHN)	26	13	3	42
2	Japan (JPN)*	6	17	14	37
3	Qatar (QAT)	3	1	2	6
4	Kazakhstan (KAZ)	2	4	5	11
5	Sri Lanka (SRI)	2	0	2	4
6	India (IND)	1	3	8	12
7	South Korea (KOR)	1	2	1	4
8	Saudi Arabia (KSA)	1	0	0	1
8	Uzbekistan (UZB)	1	0	0	1
10	Chinese Taipei (TPE)	0	1	2	3
10	Malaysia (MAS)	0	1	2	3
12	Mongolia (MGL)	0	1	0	1
13	Iran (IRI)	0	0	1	1
13	Kyrgyzstan (KGZ)	0	0	1	1
13	Syria (SYR)	0	0	1	1
13	Thailand (THA)	0	0	1	1
Totals (16 entries)		43	43	43	129

== See also ==
- 1998 in athletics (track and field)
