= 1993 Asian Athletics Championships =

1993 Asian Championships
- Dates: November 30-December 4
- Host city: Manila, Philippines
- Venue: Rizal Memorial Stadium
- Participation: at least 18 nations

The tenth Asian Championships in Athletics were held in early December 1993 in Manila, Philippines.

== Medal summary ==
=== Men ===
Event	Gold		Silver		Bronze	
100 metres (wind: +0.7 m/s)	Talal Mansour; Qatar	10.22	Li Tao; China	10.38	Lin Wei; China	10.46
200 metres (wind: +1.8 m/s)	Huang Danwei; China	20.83	Koichi Konakatomi; Japan	20.98	Zhao Cunlin; China	21.07
400 metres	Ibrahim Ismail Muftah; Qatar	45.55	Son Ju-il; South Korea	46.47	Koji Ito; Japan	46.63
800 metres	Lee Jin-il; South Korea	1:48.24	Kim Yong-hwan; South Korea	1:49.03	Malekshir Moradifard; Iran	1:49.40
1500 metres	Kim Soon-hyung; South Korea	3:38.60	Bahadur Prasad; India	3:38.95	Ahmed Ibrahim Warsama; Qatar	3:43.02
5000 metres	Bahadur Prasad; India	13:41.70	Alyan Sultan Al-Qahtani; Saudi Arabia	13:48.03	Mohammed Amer Ahmed; UAE	13:49.74 (NR)
10000 metres	Alyan Sultan Al-Qahtani; Saudi Arabia	29:48.05	Munusamy Ramachandran; Malaysia	30:16.08	Baek Seung-do; South Korea	30:24.02
3000 metre steeplechase	Saad Shadad Al-Asmari; Saudi Arabia	8:32.08	Mohammed Amer Ahmed; UAE	8:39.02	Hamid Sajjadi; Iran	8:43.29
110 metres hurdles (wind: +1.0 m/s)	Li Tong; China	13.49	Chen Yanhao; China	13.66	Yoshiaki Hoki; Japan	13.93
400 metres hurdles	Zid Abou Hamed; Syria	49.10	Chanond Keanchan; Thailand	50.46	Ali Ismail Doka; Qatar	50.89
4 × 100 metres relay	China; Huang Danwei; Li Tao; Lin Wei; Zhao Cunlin	39.47	Japan; Tetsuya Nakamura; Hideki Onohara; Takahiro Hirakawa; Yoshitaka Ito	39.65	Thailand; Seksarn Boonrat; Niti Piyapan; Vissanu Sophanich; Visut Watanasin	40.02
4 × 400 metres relay	Japan; Koji Ito; Koichi Konakatomi; Takahiro Hirakawa; Masahiro Yonezawa	3:09.03	Saudi Arabia; Mohammed Hamed Al-Bishi; Bandar Farhan Al-Misfer; Hadi Soua'an Al-Somaily; Saleh Ahmed Al-Saeidan	3:10.25	Sri Lanka; Damith da Silva; Mahinda Gunawardana; K.P. Susantha; Sugath Thilakaratne	3:10.49
20,000 metre track walk	Chen Shaoguo; China	1:26:29.69t	Hirofumi Sakai; Japan	1:28:31.26t	Sergey Korepanov; Kazakhstan	1:29:06.36t
High jump	Lee Jin-taek; South Korea	2.24	Xu Yang; China	2.21	Stanilov Mingosan; Kazakhstan	2.18
Pole vault	Grigoriy Yegorov; Kazakhstan	5.70	Igor Potapovich; Kazakhstan	5.50	Kim Chul-kyun; South Korea	5.20
Long jump	Nobuharu Asahara; Japan	8.13	Chao Chih-kuo; Chinese Taipei	8.09	Nai Hui-fang; Chinese Taipei	8.08
Triple jump	Aleksey Fatyanov; Azerbaijan	16.89	Oleg Sakirkin; Kazakhstan	16.82	Sergey Arzamasov; Kazakhstan	16.78
Shot put	Liu Hao; China	19.04	Bilal Saad Mubarak; Qatar	18.28	Sergey Kot; Uzbekistan	17.85
Discus throw	Ajit Bhaduria; India	55.52	Sergey Kot; Uzbekistan	54.90	Ma Wei; China	54.32
Hammer throw	Bi Zhong; China	70.54	Koji Murofushi; Japan	65.54	Nasser Abdul Al-Jarallah; Kuwait	60.42
Javelin throw	Zhang Lianbiao; China	78.92	Vladimir Parfyonov; Uzbekistan	77.32	Kota Suzuki; Japan	74.78
Decathlon	Oleg Veretelnikov; Uzbekistan	7601	Ramil Ganiyev; Uzbekistan	7558	Kim Tae-keun; South Korea	7397

=== Women ===
Event	Gold		Silver		Bronze	
100 metres (wind: +0.8 m/s)	Tian Yumei; China	11.36	Liu Xiaomei; China	11.49	Wang Huei-Chen; Chinese Taipei	11.60
200 metres (wind: -0.6 m/s)	Chen Zhaojing; China	23.24	Damayanthi Dharsha; Sri Lanka	23.29	Wang Huei-Chen; Chinese Taipei	23.42
400 metres	Ma Yuqin; China	51.23	Rabia Abdul Salam; Malaysia	52.56 NR	Kalawati "Kutty" Saramma; India	52.83
800 metres	Liu Li; China	2:04.18	Liu Huirong; China	2:04.32	Sriyani Dhammika Menike; Sri Lanka	2:04.90
1500 metres	Yan Wei; China	4:17.78	Ichikawa Yosuika; Japan	4:19.66	Molly Chacko; India	4:20.98
3000 metres	Qu Yunxia; China	9:15.74	Zhang Linli; China	9:16.19	Molly Chacko; India	9:24.57
10,000 metres	Wang Junxia; China	34:19.32	Zhang Lirong; China	35:28.99	Palaniappan Jayanthi; Malaysia	36:14.84
100 metres hurdles (wind: +0.4 m/s)	Zhang Yu; China	13.07	Sriyani Kulawansa; Sri Lanka	13.38	Olga Shishigina; Kazakhstan	13.57
400 metres hurdles	Natalya Torshina; Kazakhstan	56.70	Leng Xueyan; China	57.02	Reawadee Watanasin (Srithoa); Thailand	58.90
4 × 100 metres relay	China; Chen Zhaojing; Tian Yumei; Wang Ping; Liu Xiaomei	43.84	Chinese Taipei; Wang Huei-chen; Chen Shu-chen; Hsu Pei-ching; Kao Yuh-chuan	45.12	India; Kutty Saramma; Beena Augustine; Rachita Mistry; Echallakoppa Shyla	45.34
4 × 400 metres relay	China; Zhang Hengyun; Han Qing; Ma Yuqin; Leng Xueyan	3:33.76	India; Sylvina Pais; Kutty Saramma; H.G. Apsara; Shiny Abraham-Wilson	3:36.06	Malaysia; Rabia Abdul Salam; Govindasamy Shanti; Josephine Mary Singarayar; Shandri Ramachandran	3:41.66
10,000 metre track walk	Gao Hongmiao; China	47:08.98	Li Chunxiu; China	48:01.14	Yuka Mitsumori; Japan	48:03.02
High jump	Svetlana Zalevskaya; Kazakhstan	1.92	Svetlana Ruban; Uzbekistan	1.92	Chinami Sadahiro; Japan	1.89
Long jump	Yao Weili; China	6.73	Yelina Selina; Kazakhstan	6.49	Elma Muros; Philippines	6.29
Triple jump	Ren Ruiping; China	14.05	Kim Hyu-In; South Korea	12.69	Nor Aishah Ismail; Malaysia	12.45
Shot put	Zhang Liuhong; China	18.68	Lee Myung-Sun; South Korea	16.08	Aya Suzuki; Japan	15.13
Discus throw	Cao Qi; China	61.58	Zhao Yonghua; China	57.78	Ikuko Kitamori; Japan	50.40
Javelin throw	Zhang Li; China	62.14	Oksana Yarygina; Uzbekistan	59.84	Xiao Yanha; China	57.44
Heptathlon	Ghada Shouaa; Syria	6259	Wu Shulin; China	5479	Ma Chun-Ping; Chinese Taipei	5376

== Medal table ==
* Host nation (Philippines)

Rank	Nation	Gold	Silver	Bronze	Total
1	China (CHN)	23	11	4	38
2	South Korea (KOR)	3	4	3	10
3	Kazakhstan (KAZ)	3	3	4	10
4	Japan (JPN)	2	5	7	14
5	India (IND)	2	2	4	8
6	Saudi Arabia (KSA)	2	2	0	4
7	Qatar (QAT)	2	1	2	5
8	Syria (SYR)	2	0	0	2
9	Uzbekistan (UZB)	1	5	1	7
10	Azerbaijan (AZE)	1	0	0	1
11	Chinese Taipei (TPE)	0	2	4	6
12	Malaysia (MAS)	0	2	3	5
13	Sri Lanka (SRI)	0	2	2	4
14	Thailand (THA)	0	1	2	3
15	United Arab Emirates (UAE)	0	1	1	2
16	Iran (IRN)	0	0	2	2
17	Kuwait (KUW)	0	0	1	1
17	Philippines (PHI)*	0	0	1	1
Totals (18 entries)		41	41	41	123

== See also ==
- 1993 in athletics (track and field)
