= Wenzong =

Wenzong (Chinese: 文宗) is the temple name of several Chinese monarchs. It may refer to:

- Emperor Wenzong of Tang (809-840), who reigned over the Tang dynasty between 826 and 840
- Jayaatu Khan, Emperor Wenzong of Yuan (1304-1332), who reigned over the Yuan dynasty between 1328 and 1329 and again between 1329 and 1332
- Xianfeng Emperor (1831-1861), born Yizhu, of the Qing dynasty, who served between 1850 and 1861

== See also ==
- Munjong (disambiguation) (Korean romanization)
- Wen Zhong (disambiguation)
