= Zhang Cunbiao =

Chinese discus thrower

Medal record

Men's athletics

Representing China

Asian Games
Gold medal – first place	1994 Hiroshima	Discus throw
Bronze medal – third place	1998 Bangkok	Discus throw

Zhang Cunbiao (Chinese: 张存彪; born 11 February 1969) is a Chinese former track and field athlete who competed in the discus throw. He was the 1994 Asian Games champion in the event. He holds a personal best of 62.42 m (204 ft 9 1/4 in), set in 1996.

Zhang first came to prominence at national level with a win at the 1993 Chinese Athletics Championships. He gained selection for China for the 1994 Asian Games and won the gold medal with a mark of 58.78 m (192 ft 10 in), beating his compatriot Ma Wei into second place. This made him the third successive Chinese to win the men's discus, succeeding Zhang Jinglong and Li Weinan to extend China's win streak to five editions. He declined at national level in the subsequent season's, with Ma Wei and Li Shaojie becoming the country's leading discus men.

Zhang claimed the second international medal of his career at the 1997 East Asian Games with a distance of 60.42 m (198 ft 2 1/2 in) (one of the best of his career) for the silver medal. Fellow Chinese Li was the winner of the event. With another strong throw of 61.14 m (200 ft 7 in), he finished behind Li at the 8th Chinese National Games later that year, although both were beaten by the more experienced Yu Wenge.

Zhang won the second and final national title of his career in 1998. This earned him a place on the Chinese team to defend his title at the 1998 Asian Games. He fell short of his 1994 performance and left the competition with the bronze medal, while Li succeeded him as Asian Games champion. This was the last major international appearance by Zhang, but he continued to compete well at national level into his thirties, claiming fourth at the 2001 Chinese National Games and second at the 2005 Chinese Championships four years later.

== National titles ==
- Chinese Athletics Championships
  - Discus throw: 1993, 1998

== International competitions ==
Year	Competition	Venue	Position	Event	Notes
1994	Asian Games	Hiroshima, Japan	1st	Discus throw	58.78 m
1997	East Asian Games	Busan, South Korea	2nd	Discus throw	60.42 m
1998	Asian Games	Bangkok, Thailand	3rd	Discus throw	57.28 m
