= Liu Hao (shot putter) =

Chinese shot putter (born 1968)

Personal information
- Born: 19 November 1968 (age 57) Beijing, China

Sport
- Sport: Track and field
Medal record
Representing China
Asian Games
Gold medal – first place	1994 Hiroshima	Shot put
Gold medal – first place	1998 Bangkok	Shot put
Asian Championships
Gold medal – first place	1993 Manila	Shot put
Silver medal – second place	1998 Fukuoka	Shot put

Liu Hao (Chinese: 刘昊; born 19 November 1968) is a Chinese former track and field athlete who competed in the men's shot put. His personal best for the event is 19.72 m (64 ft 8 1/4 in), set in 1993.

He was among Asia's best shot putters in the 1990s. He was a two-time champion at the Asian Games and was the 1993 gold medallist at the Asian Athletics Championships. A five-time winner at the Chinese outdoor championships, he never represented his country on the global stage. He was the gold medallist at the 2001 East Asian Games.

== Career ==
Based in Beijing, Liu began to establish himself at national level in his early twenties. A personal best of 18.78 m (61 ft 7 1/4 in) in 1990 was followed by an improvement to 19.04 m (62 ft 5 1/2 in) in 1992 – a mark which ranked him second at the Chinese Athletics Championships to Ma Yongfeng and placed him within the top 100 globally that year. He had his breakthrough on the international scene the following year. He progressively improved his best over the 1993 season, culminating in a lifetime best throw of 19.72 m (64 ft 8 1/4 in) to win the title at the 7th National Games of China. After this first victory at national level, he was selected for the 1993 Asian Athletics Championships and won the gold medal there, beating runner-up Bilal Saad Mubarak by a margin of nearly 80 cm. His season's best placed him within the top forty in the world and made him the top ranked Asian shot putter for the year.

Liu continued to dominate both nationally and regionally into the 1994 season. He won for the first time at the Chinese Championships with a throw over nineteen metres, then outdid both national rival Xie Shengying and Uzbekistan's Sergey Rubtsov at the 1994 Asian Games in Hiroshima to take another international gold medal. The winning throw of 19.26 m (63 ft 2 1/4 in) was an Asian Games record and the first time the winner had cleared nineteen metres (this mark stood until 2006). Rubtsov led the Asian rankings that year, but Liu was Asia's next best performer. He defended his national title in 1995 and 1996, as well as winning at the national indoor meet in the latter year. Though still ranked in the top 80 in the world, he dropped behind Asian rivals Rubtsov and Mubarak during this period.

He was deposed at the top of the Chinese circuit by Wen Jili in 1997, taking second to him at the 8th National Games of China and losing his three-year streak at the national championships. The 1998 season marked a revival in fortunes, starting with a silver medal performance behind Mubarak at the 1998 Asian Athletics Championships. A win at the national championships came in September and that December, at the age of 30, he managed to have his best throw in four years in the 1998 Asian Games final. This mark of 19.20 m (62 ft 11 3/4 in) relegated Shakti Singh and Rubtsov to the minor medals as he became the first Chinese man to successfully defend the Asian Games title. He ranked third in Asia that year, behind Singh and another Indian athlete Bahadur Singh Sagoo, who both threw well in Calcutta. Despite this form, he faltered in 1999, trailing to Wen at the national championships and falling outside the world's top 100 as he failed to clear nineteen metres during the season.

In 2000 Liu won for a fifth and final time at the Chinese Championships with a modest mark of 18.62 m (61 ft 1 in) (his shortest winning throw at the competition). His season's best for 2001 was a throw of 18.91 m (62 ft 1/4 in) in Ningbo – this was to be the nearest he got to nineteen metres in his career after 1998. The last international medal for Liu came at the 2001 East Asian Games, where he bested Wen Jili to take the gold medal. Neither was victorious at the 9th National Games of China later that year as Liu took second place to Wang Zhiyong, marking the emergence of a new generation of throwers. Liu was out of the top three at the Chinese Championships that year.

Liu's final years of competition came in 2002 and 2003. He was runner-up at the nationals in 2002 (Jia Peng took the honours) and had a marked decline in his final season, during which he failed to throw beyond eighteen metres and was out of the top ten nationally.

== Personal bests ==
- Shot put (outdoor) – 19.72 m (64 ft 8 1/4 in) (1993)
- Shot put (indoor) – 18.58 m (60 ft 11 1/4 in) (1996)

== National titles ==
- Chinese Athletics Championships: 1994, 1995, 1996, 1998, 2000
- National Games of China: 1993
- Chinese Indoor Championships: 1996

== International competitions ==
Year	Competition	Venue	Position	Notes
1993	Asian Championships	Manila, Philippines	1st	Shot put
1994	Asian Games	Hiroshima, Japan	1st	Shot put
1998	Asian Championships	Fukuoka City, Japan	2nd	Shot put
1998	Asian Games	Bangkok, Thailand	1st	Shot put
2001	East Asian Games	Osaka, Japan	1st	Shot put
