= Ikuko Kitamori =

Japanese discus thrower

Personal information
- Born: 10 March 1963 (age 63) Nara Prefecture, Japan

Sport
- Sport: Track and field
Medal record
Representing Japan
Asian Games
| Silver medal – second place | 1994 Hiroshima | Discus throw |
| Bronze medal – third place | 1990 Beijing | Discus throw |
Asian Championships
| Silver medal – second place | 1989 New Delhi | Discus throw |
| Bronze medal – third place | 1985 Jakarta | Discus throw |
| Bronze medal – third place | 1993 Manila | Discus throw |

Ikuko Kitamori (北森 郁子, Kitamori Ikuko) (born 10 March 1963) is a former female track and field athlete from Japan, who competed for her native country in the women's discus throw event.

== International competitions ==
| Year | Competition | Venue | Position | Event | Notes |
|---|---|---|---|---|---|
| 1985 | Asian Championships | Jakarta, Indonesia | 3rd | Discus throw | 50.48 m |
| 1989 | Asian Championships | New Delhi, India | 2nd | Discus throw | 51.78 m |
| 1990 | Asian Games | Beijing, China | 3rd | Discus throw | 53.82 m |
| 1993 | Asian Championships | Manila, Philippines | 3rd | Discus throw | 50.40 m |
| 1994 | Asian Games | Hiroshima, Japan | 2nd | Discus throw | 53.92 m |
