= Yan Wei =

Chinese middle-distance runner

Medal record

Women's athletics

Representing China

Asian Championships
Gold medal – first place	1993 Manila	1500 m

Yan Wei (born 4 October 1973) is a retired Chinese middle distance runner who specialized in the 1500 metres.

She finished tenth at the 1993 World Championships, won the 1993 Asian Championships and took the silver at the 1994 Asian Games.

Her personal best time was 3:58.74 minutes, achieved in October 1997 in Shanghai.
