= Sun Sumei (athlete) =

Chinese sprinter

Personal information
- Nationality: Chinese
- Born: 6 October 1968 (age 57)

Sport
- Sport: Sprinting
- Event: 400 metres
Medal record
Women's athletics
Representing China
Asian Championships
Silver medal – second place	1989 New Delhi	4×400 m

Sun Sumei (simplified Chinese: 孙素梅; traditional Chinese: 孫素梅; pinyin: Sūn Sùméi, born 6 October 1968) is a Chinese sprinter. She competed in the women's 400 metres at the 1988 Summer Olympics. She is from Qingdao.
