= Peng Xiaoming =

Chinese pole vaulter

Medal record

Women's Sport of athletics

Representing China

Asian Championships
Gold medal – first place	1998 Fukuoka	Pole vault

Peng Xiaoming (born 15 May 1975) is a retired female pole vaulter from PR China. Her personal best jump is 4.15 metres, achieved in October 1997 in Shanghai.

== Achievements ==
Year	Competition	Venue	Position	Notes
Representing China
1998	Asian Championships	Fukuoka, Japan	1st	
