= Zhang Yu (hurdler) =

Chinese hurdler (born 1971)

Medal record

Women's athletics

Asian Championships
Gold medal – first place	1991 Kuala Lumpur	100 m hurdles
Gold medal – first place	1993 Manila	100 m hurdles
Silver medal – second place	1995 Jakarta	100 m hurdles

Zhang Yu (Chinese: 張瑜; born 8 April 1971) is a retired female Chinese hurdler. She represented her country at the 1992 Summer Olympics.

Her personal best time is 12.64 seconds, achieved in September 1993 in Beijing at the 7th Chinese National Games. This is the current Chinese record.

== National titles ==
- National Games of the People's Republic of China
  - 100 m hurdles: 1993
- Chinese Athletics Championships
  - 100 m hurdles: 1991, 1992, 1993, 1994, 1996, 1997

== International competitions ==
Year	Competition	Venue	Position	Event	Notes
1990	Asian Junior Championships	Beijing, China	1st	100 m hurdles	13.45
1991	Asian Championships	Kuala Lumpur, Malaysia	1st	100 m hurdles	13.37
1991	World Championships	Tokyo, Japan	8th (semis)	100 m hurdles	13.24
1992	Olympic Games	Barcelona, Spain	7th (semis)	100 m hurdles	13.39
1993	Asian Championships	Manila, Philippines	1st	100 m hurdles	13.07 CR
1993	East Asian Games	Shanghai, China	1st	100 m hurdles	13.23
1994	Asian Games	Hiroshima, Japan	3rd	100 m hurdles	12.90
1995	Asian Championships	Djakarta, Indonesia	2nd	100 m hurdles	13.44
