= Mao Xinyuan =

Chinese racewalker

Personal information
- Born: July 2, 1971 (age 55)

Sport
- Sport: Race walking
Medal record
Representing China
Asian Games
| Gold medal – first place | 1990 Beijing | 20km walk |

Mao Xinyuan (simplified Chinese: 毛新远; traditional Chinese: 毛新遠; pinyin: Máo Xīnyuǎn; born July 2, 1971) is a retired male race walker from PR China. He competed for his native country at the 1996 Summer Olympics.

== Achievements ==
| Year | Competition | Venue | Position | Event | Notes |
Representing China
| 1990 | Asian Games | Beijing, PR China | 1st | 20 km | 1:23:16 |
| 1996 | Olympic Games | Atlanta, Georgia, United States | — | 50 km | DSQ |
