= Wang Yanchun =

Chinese politician

Wang Yanchun (Chinese: 王延春; 1910 – March 19, 1984), born Wang Wusheng (Chinese: 王武生), was a People's Republic of China politician. He was born in Quyang County, Zhili Province (now Hebei Province). He joined the Chinese Communist Party in 1937.

Preceded by Zhang Pinghua	Communist Party Chief of Hunan	Succeeded by Li Yuan
