= Wang Chunmei =

Chinese long-distance runner

Medal record

Women's athletics

Representing China

Asian Championships
Gold medal – first place	1998 Fukuoka	5000 m
Silver medal – second place	1998 Fukuoka	1500 m

Wang Chunmei (born 10 April 1976) is a retired Chinese long-distance runner who specialized in the 5000 metres.

Her personal best time was 15:07.16 minutes, achieved in July 1998 in Rome. She also had 3:59.48 minutes in the 1500 metres, achieved in October 1997 in Shanghai.

== Achievements ==
Year	Competition	Venue	Position	Notes
Representing China
1998	Asian Championships	Fukuoka, Japan	2nd	1500 m
1998	Asian Championships	Fukuoka, Japan	1st	5000 m
1998	World Cup	Madrid, Spain	4th	3000 m
