= Pranati Mishra =

Indian athlete (born 1970)

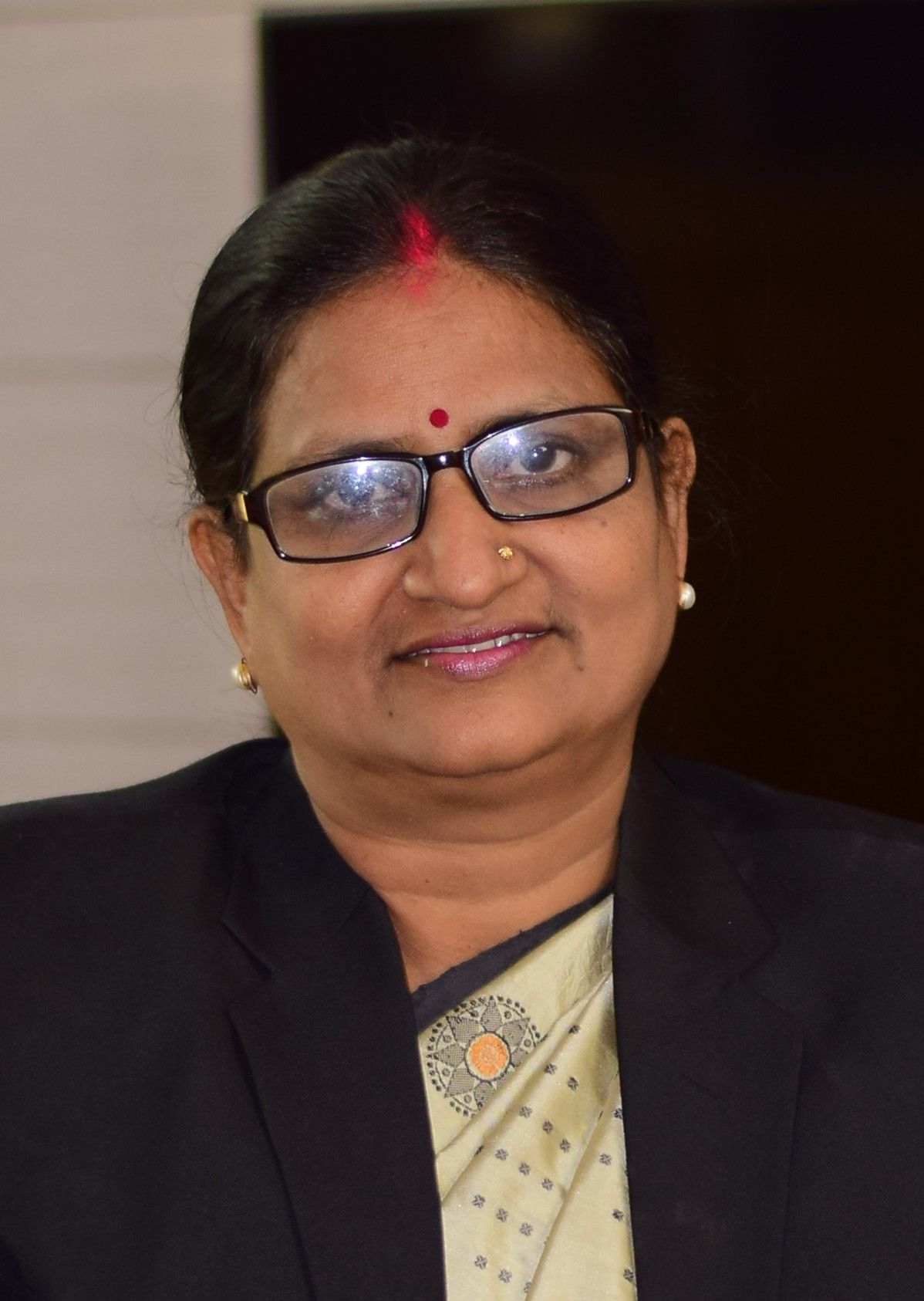
- Mishra in 2020

Personal information
- Born: 12 May 1970 (age 56) Balangir, Odisha, India
- Education: Rajendra Narayan University, Balangir
- Spouse: Sachikanta Pati (m. 1999)

Sport
- Country: India
- Sport: Athletics
- Events: 100m, 200m, 400m, 4*100m Relay, 4*200m Relay, 4*400m Relay
- Coached by: Subash Chandra Dasmohapatra
- Retired: 1992
Medal record
Women's athletics
Representing India
Asian Games
Silver medal – second place	1990 Beijing	4×400 m

Pranati Mishra (born 12 May 1970) is an Indian athlete. She won a silver medal in 4 × 400 m relay in the 1990 Asian Games. The four member relay team comprised P. T. Usha, K. Saramma, Shantimol Philips besides Pranati. She is currently working with the Food Corporation of India in Bhubaneswar, Odisha.

== Career ==
Pranati started her sports career early in her life during her schooldays. Along with athletics, she also played kabaddi and kho-kho during her school days. Pranati started her formal training at the Sports Authority of India Training Centre in Cuttack, Odisha under the guidance of her coach Subash Chandra Dasmohapatra. She participated in the State School Athletic Meet from 1985 to 1987 where she was adjudged the best athlete consecutively for three years. She won the 100m, 200m and 400m races at the State Meets from 1985 to 1990 and has also set up a State Meet record.

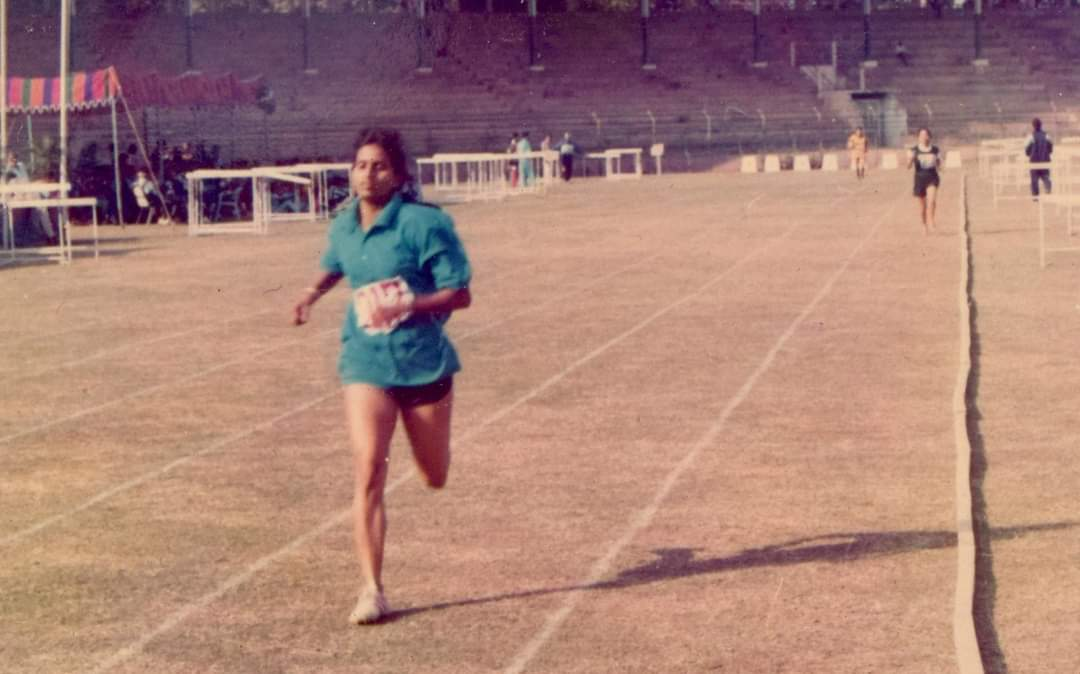
Pranati Mishra Running in an Event

She became a full-time athlete in 1985 when she participated in the School National Games in Thiruvananthapuram, Kerala, and won the silver medal in the 200m category. She then went on to win gold medals in both 200m and 400m category at the Junior National Athletics Championship held in Delhi in 1986–87. In the succeeding year she won three silver medals in 200m, 400m and 800m category in the same championship held at Bangalore, India. In 1988–89, she won the gold medal in 400m and silver medal in 200m at the Senior National Athletics Championships held at Guntur, Andhra Pradesh. She again bagged the gold medal in 400m and silver medal in 200m at the Senior National Athletics Championships held at Delhi in 1989–90.

She won the gold medal in the 4*400m relay at the Athletics Permit Meet held at Chennai in 1987–88. Mishra finished 4th in 400m race at the Junior Asian Athletics Championships held in Singapore in 1987–88. She won silver medals in 400m and 4*400m relay in the Athletics Permit Meet in 1988–89.

Pranati the participated in the Asian Games held at Beijing, China from 27 September to 3 October 1990. She won the silver medal in the 4*400m relay clocking 3:38.45. The other three members of the Indian relay team along with Pranati were P. T. Usha, Shantimol Philips and K. Saramma.

A knee injury cut short her career in 1992.

== Personal life ==
Pranati was born in Balangir, Odisha, India to Lambodar Mishra and Kumudini Mishra. She was the fifth among seven children. She has three brothers and three sisters. All three of her sisters were athletes. She did her schooling from Government Girls High School, Balangir and later on completed her higher studies from Rajendra Narayan University, Balangir.

She married Sachikanta Pati, who works with the State Bank of India in 1999. The couple have a son Sanket Pati and currently reside in Bhubaneswar, Odisha, India.
