= Liu Shuzhen =

Chinese long jumper (born 1966)

Medal record

Women's athletics

Representing China

Asian Championships
Gold medal – first place	1989 New Delhi	Long jump
Silver medal – second place	1991 Kuala Lumpur	Long jump

Liu Shuzhen (Chinese: 刘淑珍; pinyin: Liú Shūzhēn; born 7 March 1966) is a retired Chinese long jumper.

Her personal best jump was 6.92 metres, achieved in June 1990 in Beijing.

== International competitions ==
Year	Competition	Venue	Position	Notes
1988	Olympic Games	Seoul, South Korea	11th	
1989	Asian Championships	New Delhi, India	1st	
1990	Asian Games	Beijing, China	2nd	
1991	Asian Championships	Kuala Lumpur, Malaysia	2nd	
