= Li Dalong =

Chinese long jumper (born 1980)

Li Dalong (Chinese: 李大龙; born 21 October 1980) is a Chinese long jumper.

Dalong was born in Heilongjiang, China. He had a successful career early in his life, as in 1992 at age 12, he won the B-class Heilongjiang Youth Championships. He joined the Shenzhen sports team in 1998 to focus on athletics under jumps coach Mai Guoqiang.

Representing Guangdong, Dalong won the 2001 National Games of China with a 7.95 m mark. He wanted to use the championships to commemorate his father, who asked him to win the National Games gold medal before he died. He was a runner-up at the 2002 Chinese Athletics Championships.

On 12 October 2002, won the silver medal at the Asian Games. He had a chance to improve his position, but he fouled on his fifth jump. He also competed at the 2003 World Indoor Championships without reaching the final.

His personal best jump is 8.22 metres, achieved in June 2001 in Baoding.
