= Xiong Qiying =

Chinese long jumper (born 1967)

Personal information
- Born: 14 October 1967 (age 58) Sichuan Province, China

Sport
- Sport: Track and field
Medal record
Representing China
Asian Games
Gold medal – first place	1990 Beijing	Long jump

Xiong Qiying (born 14 October 1967) is a retired Chinese long jumper.

Her personal best jump was 7.03 metres, achieved in October 1997 in Shanghai, but the result was later annulled, as she was found to have been doping.

== Doping ==
In 1997 Xiong tested positive for a prohibited substance and was subsequently banned from sports by the Chinese Olympic Committee's anti-doping commission.

== Achievements ==
Year	Tournament	Venue	Result	Event
1988	Olympic Games	Seoul, South Korea	9th	
1989	World Indoor Championships	Budapest, Hungary	7th	
1989	World Cup	Barcelona, Spain	5th	
1990	Asian Games	Beijing, China	1st	6.69 CR
1993	Chinese National Games	Beijing, China	3rd	6.79
1997	Chinese National Games	Shanghai, China	DQ	
