= Dou Zhaobo =

Chinese middle-distance runner

Personal information
- Nationality: Chinese
- Born: 23 September 1983 (age 42)

Sport
- Sport: Middle-distance running
- Event: 1500 metres

Dou Zhaobo (born 23 September 1983) is a Chinese middle-distance runner. He competed in the men's 1500 metres at the 2004 Summer Olympics.
