= Cui Yingzi =

Chinese racewalker

Cui Yingzi (Chinese: 崔 英姿; born January 26, 1971) is a retired female race walker from PR China, who competed for her native country at the 1992 Summer Olympics in Barcelona, Spain. She set her personal best (42.47) in the women's 10 km event in 1992.

== Achievements ==
Year	Competition	Venue	Position	Event	Notes
Representing China
1991	World Race Walking Cup	San Jose, United States	20th	10 km	46:36
1992	Olympic Games	Barcelona, Spain	5th	10 km	45:15
