= Zhang Caihua =

Chinese sprinter

Personal information
- Nationality: Chinese
- Born: 10 December 1964 (age 61)
- Height: 167 cm (5 ft 6 in)
- Weight: 61 kg (134 lb)

Sport
- Sport: Sprinting
- Event: 100 metres
Medal record
Women's athletics
Representing China
Asian Championships
Gold medal – first place	1989 New Delhi	100 m
Gold medal – first place	1989 New Delhi	4×100 m

Zhang Caihua (Chinese: 张彩华; born 10 December 1964) is a Chinese retired sprinter. She competed in the women's 100 metres at the 1988 Summer Olympics.
