= Dong Yuping =

Chinese heptathlete (born 1963)

Personal information
- Full name: 董玉萍
- Nationality: Chinese
- Born: 1 March 1963 (age 63)

Sport
- Sport: Athletics
- Event: Heptathlon
Medal record
Women's athletics
Representing China
Asian Championships
Gold medal – first place	1987 Singapore	Heptathlon
Gold medal – first place	1989 New Delhi	Heptathlon
Silver medal – second place	1985 Jakarta	Heptathlon

Dong Yuping (born 1 March 1963) is a retired Chinese athlete. She competed in the women's heptathlon at the 1988 Summer Olympics.
