= Gong Guohua =

Chinese decathlete (born 1964)

Personal information
- Born: January 22, 1964 (age 62) Nanjing, China

Sport
- Sport: Track and field
Medal record
Representing China
Asian Games
Bronze medal – third place	1990 Beijing	Decathlon
Asian Championships
Gold medal – first place	1987 Singapore	Decathlon
Gold medal – first place	1991 Kuala Lumpur	Decathlon
Silver medal – second place	1989 New Delhi	Decathlon

Gong Guohua (born January 22, 1964) is a retired Chinese male decathlete. He competed at the 1988 Summer Olympics and he set his personal best in the men's decathlon (7908 points) in Beijing on June 24, 1990.

== Achievements ==
Year	Tournament	Venue	Result	Points
1987	Asian Championships	Singapore	1st	7848
1988	Olympic Games	Seoul, South Korea	31st	7231
1989	Asian Championships	New Delhi, India	2nd	7649
1990	Asian Games	Beijing, PR China	3rd	7453
1991	Asian Championships	Kuala Lumpur, Malaysia	1st	7652
