= Ge Ping (athlete) =

Chinese high jumper

Personal information
- Born: 11 January 1961 (age 65)

Sport
- Sport: Track and field
Medal record
Representing China
Asian Championships
Silver medal – second place	1983 Kuwait City	High jump

Ge Ping (born 11 January 1961) is a retired Chinese high jumper.

She won the silver medal at the 1983 Asian Championships, and competed at the 1984 Olympic Games without reaching the final.

Her personal best jump was 1.92 metres, achieved in September 1983 in Shanghai.
