= Zhou Wei (athlete) =

Chinese sprinter (born 1976)

Personal information
- Native name: 周伟

Sport
- Country: China
- Sport: Athletics
- Event: 100 metres
Medal record
Men's athletics
Representing China
Asian Championships
Gold medal – first place	1998 Fukuoka	100 m
Gold medal – first place	1998 Fukuoka	4×100 m

Zhou Wei (Chinese: 周伟; pinyin: Zhōu Wěi; born 1976 in Ganzhou, Jiangxi province) is a Chinese track and field athlete who competes in the sprints.

Zhou won a gold medal in 1998 Asian Athletics Championships over 100 metres and held the Chinese record in 100 m with his best of 10.17 seconds.

== Doping ==
Zhou Wei tested positive for a prohibited substance on 7 June 2000, and was subsequently handed a two-year ban from sport.
