= Lao Jianfeng =

Chinese athlete (born 1975)

Lao Jianfeng (simplified Chinese: 劳剑峰; traditional Chinese: 勞劍峰; pinyin: Láo Jiànfēng; born May 24, 1975) is a retired male Chinese long jumper. His personal best jump is 8.40 metres, achieved in May 1997 in Zhaoqing. This is the current Chinese record.

He finished tenth in the long jump at the 1997 World Championships and won the silver medal in triple jump at the 2002 Asian Games. He competed in both events at the 2000 Olympic Games.

== Achievements ==
Year	Competition	Venue	Position	Notes
Representing China
1997	East Asian Games	Busan, South Korea	2nd	16.71 m
