= Jing Xuezhu =

Chinese high jumper (born 1975)

Medal record

Women's athletics

Representing China

Asian Championships
Silver medal – second place	2005 Incheon	High jump

Jing Xuezhu (born 20 April 1975) is a Chinese high jumper.

She finished twelfth at the 2003 Universiade and won the silver medal at the 2005 Asian Championships. She also competed at the 2004 Olympic Games without reaching the final round.

Her personal best jump height is 1.94 metres (6.4 ft), achieved in May 2004 in Shijiazhuang.
