= Li Tao (sprinter) =

Chinese sprinter (born 1968)

Personal information
- Nationality: Chinese
- Born: 15 January 1968 (age 58)

Sport
- Sport: Sprinting
- Event: 100 metres
Medal record
Men's athletics
Representing China
Asian Championships
Gold medal – first place	1985 Jakarta	4×100 m
Gold medal – first place	1989 New Delhi	4×100 m
Gold medal – first place	1993 Manila	4×100 m
Silver medal – second place	1987 Singapore	4×100 m
Silver medal – second place	1989 New Delhi	100 m
Silver medal – second place	1993 Manila	100 m
Bronze medal – third place	1987 Singapore	100 m

Li Tao (Chinese: 李涛, born 15 January 1968) is a Chinese sprinter. He competed in the men's 100 metres at the 1988 Summer Olympics.
