= Zhang Guowei (runner) =

Chinese long-distance runner

Medal record

Men's athletics

Representing China

Asian Championships
Gold medal – first place	1983 Kuwait City	5000 m
Gold medal – first place	1983 Kuwait City	10,000 m
Gold medal – first place	1985 Jakarta	10,000 m
Gold medal – first place	1989 New Delhi	5000 m
Silver medal – second place	1989 New Delhi	10,000 m

Zhang Guowei (born 4 January 1959 in Heqing County, Yunnan) is a male Chinese former long-distance runner who competed in the 1988 Summer Olympics, the Asian Games and the Asian Athletics Championships. He has competed in the 5000 metres, the 10,000 metres, and the Marathon. Zhang is an ethnic Bai from Yunnan province.
