= Chen Wenzhong =

Chinese sprinter (born 1970)

Personal information
- Born: 29 August 1970 (age 56) Guangxi, China
- Occupation: Sprinter
Medal record
Men's athletics
Representing China
Asian Championships
Gold medal – first place	1991 Kuala Lumpur	4×100 m
Silver medal – second place	1991 Kuala Lumpur	100 m

Chen Wenzhong (Chinese: 陈文忠; born 29 August 1970) is a former Chinese sprinter who competed in the men's 100m competition at the 1996 Summer Olympics. He recorded a 10.37, enough to qualify for the next round past the heats. In round two, he recorded a 10.29, beneath the minimum to advance. His personal best is 10.20, set in 1996. He also competed in that Olympiad's 200m competition, scoring a 21.05 in the first heat.
