= Xu Yang (high jumper) =

Chinese high jumper

Personal information
- Born: 27 June 1970 (age 56) Jiangsu, China

Sport
- Sport: Track and field
Medal record
Representing China
Asian Games
Bronze medal – third place	1994 Hiroshima	High jump
Asian Championships
Silver medal – second place	1993 Manila	High jump
Silver medal – second place	1995 Jakarta	High jump

Xu Yang (born 27 June 1970) is a retired Chinese high jumper.

He won the silver medals at the 1993 and 1995 Asian Championships and the bronze medal at the 1994 Asian Games. He also competed at the 1991 World Championships and the 1992 Olympic Games without reaching the final.

His personal best jump is 2.31 metres, achieved in September 1993 in Beijing.
