= Zhu Yuqing =

Chinese heptathlete

Medal record

Women's athletics

Representing China

Asian Championships
| Gold medal – first place | 1991 Kuala Lumpur | Heptathlon |

Zhu Yuqing (born 22 April 1963) is a retired Chinese heptathlete.

She finished eighth at the 1987 World Championships and twelfth at the 1991 World Championships. On the regional level she won the 1986 Asian Games and the 1991 Asian Championships.
