= Bi Zhong =

Chinese hammer thrower (born 1968)

Personal information
- Born: September 1, 1968 (age 58) Dalian, China

Sport
- Sport: Track and field
Medal record
Representing China
Asian Games
Gold medal – first place	1990 Beijing	Hammer throw
Gold medal – first place	1994 Hiroshima	Hammer throw
Asian Championships
Gold medal – first place	1989 New Delhi	Hammer throw
Gold medal – first place	1991 Kuala Lumpur	Hammer throw
Gold medal – first place	1993 Manila	Hammer throw
Gold medal – first place	1995 Jakarta	Hammer throw

Bi Zhong (born September 1, 1968) is a retired male hammer thrower from Dalian, PR China, who competed for his native country at the 1992 Summer Olympics in Barcelona, Spain. He set the national record at 77.04 metres on August 4, 1989, at a meet in Jinggangshan City, Jiangxi.

== Achievements ==
Year	Competition	Venue	Position	Notes
Representing China
1989	Asian Championships	New Delhi, India	1st	68.94 m
1989	IAAF World Cup	Barcelona, Spain	4th	70.50 m
1990	Asian Games	Beijing, PR China	1st	71.30 m
1991	Asian Championships	Kuala Lumpur, Malaysia	1st	69.90 m
1991	World Championships	Tokyo, Japan	11th	69.50 m
1992	Olympic Games	Barcelona, Spain	12th	74.30 m
1992	IAAF World Cup	Havana, Cuba	4th	75.30 m
1993	Asian Championships	Manila, Philippines	1st	70.54 m
1994	Asian Games	Hiroshima, Japan	1st	71.30 m
1995	Asian Championships	Jakarta, Indonesia	1st	70.30 m
1997	East Asian Games	Busan, South Korea	3rd	68.68 m
