= Ha Xiaoyan =

Chinese javelin thrower

Personal information
- Nationality: Chinese
- Born: 30 January 1972 (age 54)

Sport
- Sport: Athletics
- Event: Javelin throw
Medal record
Women's athletics
Representing China
Asian Championships
Bronze medal – third place	1995 Jakarta	Javelin throw

Ha Xiaoyan (born 30 January 1972) is a Chinese athlete. She competed in the women's javelin throw at the 1992 Summer Olympics.
