= Huang Geng =

Chinese long jumper (born 1970)

Medal record

Men's athletics

Representing China

Asian Championships
Gold medal – first place	1995 Jakarta	4×100 m
Gold medal – first place	1995 Jakarta	Long jump

Huang Geng (born 10 July 1970) is a Chinese retired long jumper. His personal best is 8.38 metres, achieved in May 1995 in Taiyuan.

== Achievements ==
Year	Competition	Venue	Position	Notes
Representing China
1990	Asian Games	Beijing, China	2nd	
1992	Olympic Games	Barcelona, Spain	8th	
1994	Asian Games	Hiroshima, Japan	1st	
1995	World Indoor Championships	Barcelona, Spain	8th	
1995	World Championships	Gothenburg, Sweden	7th	
1995	Asian Championships	Jakarta, Indonesia	1st	8.26 m CR
1996	Olympic Games	Atlanta, United States	9th	
1997	East Asian Games	Busan, South Korea	2nd	8.03 m
