= Zhang Lianbiao =

Chinese javelin thrower (born 1969)

Personal information
- Born: 25 January 1969 (age 57) Shaoyang, China

Sport
- Sport: Track and field
Medal record
Representing China
Asian Games
Gold medal – first place	1994 Hiroshima	Javelin throw
Silver medal – second place	1998 Bangkok	Javelin throw
Asian Championships
Gold medal – first place	1991 Kuala Lumpur	Javelin throw
Gold medal – first place	1993 Manila	Javelin throw
Gold medal – first place	1995 Jakarta	Javelin throw
Gold medal – first place	1998 Fukuoka	Javelin throw
Summer Universiade
Gold medal – first place	1995 Fukuoka	Javelin throw

Zhang Lianbiao (born 25 January 1969) is a retired male javelin thrower from PR China. He set his personal best (83.38 metres) on 16 October 1994 in Hiroshima.

== Seasonal bests by year ==
- 1991 - 78.94
- 1992 - 75.42
- 1994 - 83.38
- 1996 - 80.96
- 1997 - 73.16
- 1998 - 78.95
- 2000 - 78.85
- 2001 - 80.72

== Achievements ==
Year	Competition	Venue	Position	Notes
Representing China
1991	Asian Championships	Kuala Lumpur, Malaysia	1st	81.52 m
1991	World Championships	Tokyo, Japan	13th	78.94 m
1992	Olympic Games	Barcelona, Spain	25th	73.86 m
1993	Asian Championships	Manila, Philippines	1st	78.92 m
1994	Asian Games	Hiroshima, Japan	1st	83.38 m
1995	Asian Championships	Jakarta, Indonesia	1st	79.60 m
1995	Universiade	Fukuoka, Japan	1st	79.30 m
1996	Olympic Games	Atlanta, Georgia, USA	11th	80.96 m
1997	East Asian Games	Busan, South Korea	1st	77.80 m
1998	Asian Games	Bangkok, Thailand	2nd	78.58 m
1998	IAAF World Cup	Johannesburg, South Africa	7th	68.35 m
1998	Asian Championships	Fukuoka, Japan	1st	77.61 m
