= Li Mingcai =

Chinese racewalker (born 1971)

Medal record

Men's athletics

Representing China

Asian Championships
Gold medal – first place	1995 Jakarta	20 km walk

Li Mingcai (Chinese: 李明才; pinyin: Lǐ Míngcái; born August 22, 1971) is a retired male race walker from PR China. He competed for his native country at two consecutive Summer Olympics, starting in 1992.

== Achievements ==
Year	Competition	Venue	Position	Notes
Representing China
1990	Asian Games	Beijing, China	3rd	20 km
1991	World Race Walking Cup	San Jose, United States	11th	20 km
1991	World Championships	Tokyo, Japan	8th	20 km
1992	Olympic Games	Barcelona, Spain	DNF	20 km
1993	World Race Walking Cup	Monterrey, Mexico	12th	20 km
1993	World Championships	Stuttgart, Germany	DNF	20 km
1995	World Race Walking Cup	Beijing, China	10th	20 km
1995	Asian Championships	Jakarta, Indonesia	1st	20 km
1996	Olympic Games	Atlanta, Georgia, United States	DSQ	20 km
