= Zou Sixin =

Chinese triple jumper

Medal record

Men's athletics

Representing China

Asian Championships
Silver medal – second place	1991 Kuala Lumpur	Triple jump

Zou Sixin (born 5 August 1967) is a Chinese retired triple jumper, best known for finishing eighth at the 1992 Summer Olympics.

His personal best was 17.31 metres, achieved in October 1990 in Beijing. This result places him second on the all-time Chinese performers list, only behind Zou Zhenxian.

== Achievements ==
Year	Competition	Venue	Position	Event	Notes
Representing China
1990	Asian Games	Beijing, China	2nd	Triple jump	
1991	World Indoor Championships	Seville, Spain	4th	Triple jump	
1991	Asian Championships	Kuala Lumpur, Malaysia	2nd	Triple jump	
1992	Olympic Games	Barcelona, Spain	8th	Triple jump	
1993	East Asian Games	Shanghai, China	1st	Triple jump	
1996	Olympic Games	Atlanta, United States	21st	Triple jump	16.53 m
