= Ma Yongfeng =

Chinese shot putter (born 1962)

Medal record

Men's athletics

Representing China

Asian Championships
Gold medal – first place	1987 Singapore	Shot put

Ma Yongfeng (born 28 November 1962) is a Chinese former shot putter who competed in the 1988 Summer Olympics.
