= Wei Yanan =

Chinese marathon runner (born 1981)

Medal record

Women's athletics

Representing China

Military World Games
Silver medal – second place	2011 Rio de Janeiro	Marathon

East Asian Games
Bronze medal – third place	2001 Osaka	Half marathon

Wei Yanan (Chinese: 魏亚楠 ; born 6 December 1981 in Kunshan, Jiangsu Province) is a Chinese marathon runner. She won the Beijing Marathon at the age of eighteen and has won marathons in Seoul, Shanghai and Dalian.

Wei won the 2002 Beijing Marathon in a record time, but was disqualified after failing a drugs test and was banned from the sport for two years. Her personal best time for the marathon is 2:23:12 hours, while her 10 km road best of 31:49 minutes is a Chinese record. She represented China at the 2002 IAAF World Half Marathon Championships and the 2007 World Championships in Athletics. She has won medals at the 2001 East Asian Games and the 2011 Military World Games.

== Career ==
Born in Kunshan, Jiangsu Province, she first made her impact as a long-distance runner in 1999 when she broke the Chinese record for the 10 km road distance with a run of 31:49 minutes in Beijing. The following year she made her debut over the marathon distance at the Jinan Marathon, recording a time of 2:37:10 hours for fourth. In October she won the Beijing Marathon in a course record time of 2:26:34 hours, beating the pre-race favourite Sun Yingjie by a margin of two seconds. That same year she won the Seoul Half Marathon and came third at the Sendai Half Marathon in Japan, where she set a national junior record of 1:02:04 minutes.

Wei began the following year at the 2001 East Asian Games, taking bronze in the half marathon, then made her debut at the Boston Marathon where she managed eighth place. The Beijing Marathon was incorporated into the 2001 Chinese National Games and she was the runner-up behind Liu Min in a personal best of 2:24:02 hours. The track and field programme for the National Games was held a month later and she came fourth over 10,000 metres and fifth over 5000 metres. The following year she won the Seoul International Marathon in a time of 2:25:06 hours, improving the course record by over five minutes.

She represented China at the 2002 IAAF World Half Marathon Championships and finished in 29th place. Wei won the Beijing Marathon for a second time that October and broke the Chinese record with her run of 2:20:23 hours. However, her doping sample tested positive for banned substances and as a result she was banned for two years, stripped of her title and record, and runner-up Sun Yingjie was declared the winner.

She returned from her ban in October 2004 and promptly won the Dalian Marathon. Just over two weeks later, she ran at the Shanghai Marathon and took her second marathon victory of the year. In December she ran her third marathon within a 40-day period and was much slower (2:45:23), ending up fifth at the Singapore Marathon. The 2005 Seoul Marathon marked a return to form, as she finished second with a time of 2:25:55 hours, but she was slower at the Beijing Marathon and came eleventh (a placing which also served for the 2005 Chinese Games). Her 2006 was below-par: she was sixth at the Xiamen Marathon and won the low-key Langfang Marathon with a run of 2:42:49 hours.

In 2007, Wei reached new heights with a personal best run of 2:23:12 hours to take her second career victory at the Seoul Marathon. As a result, she was selected for the Chinese team at the 2007 World Championships in Athletics, but at the event in Osaka she failed to match her early season form and finished in 37th place. As a member of the Chinese military, she competed at the 2007 Military World Games and was fourth in the 10,000 m and sixth in the 5000 metres. The 2008 Xiamen Marathon provided an opportunity to qualify for the 2008 Beijing Olympics, but her time of 2:25:10 hours was only enough for third as her younger compatriots Zhang Yingying and Bai Xue took the top two spots. Wei failed to finish the Good Luck Beijing test marathon and was not selected for the Olympic squad. Instead, she made her European debut in October at the Maratona d'Italia in Carpi and was the runner-up behind Rosaria Console. Her year came to an end at the Shanghai Marathon, where she came in second place some thirty seconds behind Irina Timofeyeva.

At the beginning of 2009, she was eighth in the marathon in Xiamen and came third in Seoul. She came third at the Yangzhou Jianzhen International Half Marathon with a run of 1:01:54 hours. She was only ninth at the Beijing Marathon in October, but ended the season on a high with a win at the Shanghai Marathon. She suffered from poor form in 2010, failing to reach the top five at marathons in Daegu, Dalian and Taiyuan. Her final, and quickest, race of the year came in Beijing, where her run of 2:30:46 hours brought her fourth place. At the 2011 Seoul Marathon she ran 2:27:13 hours (her fastest time since 2008) for second place after Ethiopian Robe Guta. In July she won her first global championship medal at the 2011 Military World Games, taking the silver medal in the marathon behind North Korea's Kim Kum-Ok.

== See also ==
- List of doping cases in athletics
