= Wang Jiali =

Chinese long-distance runner

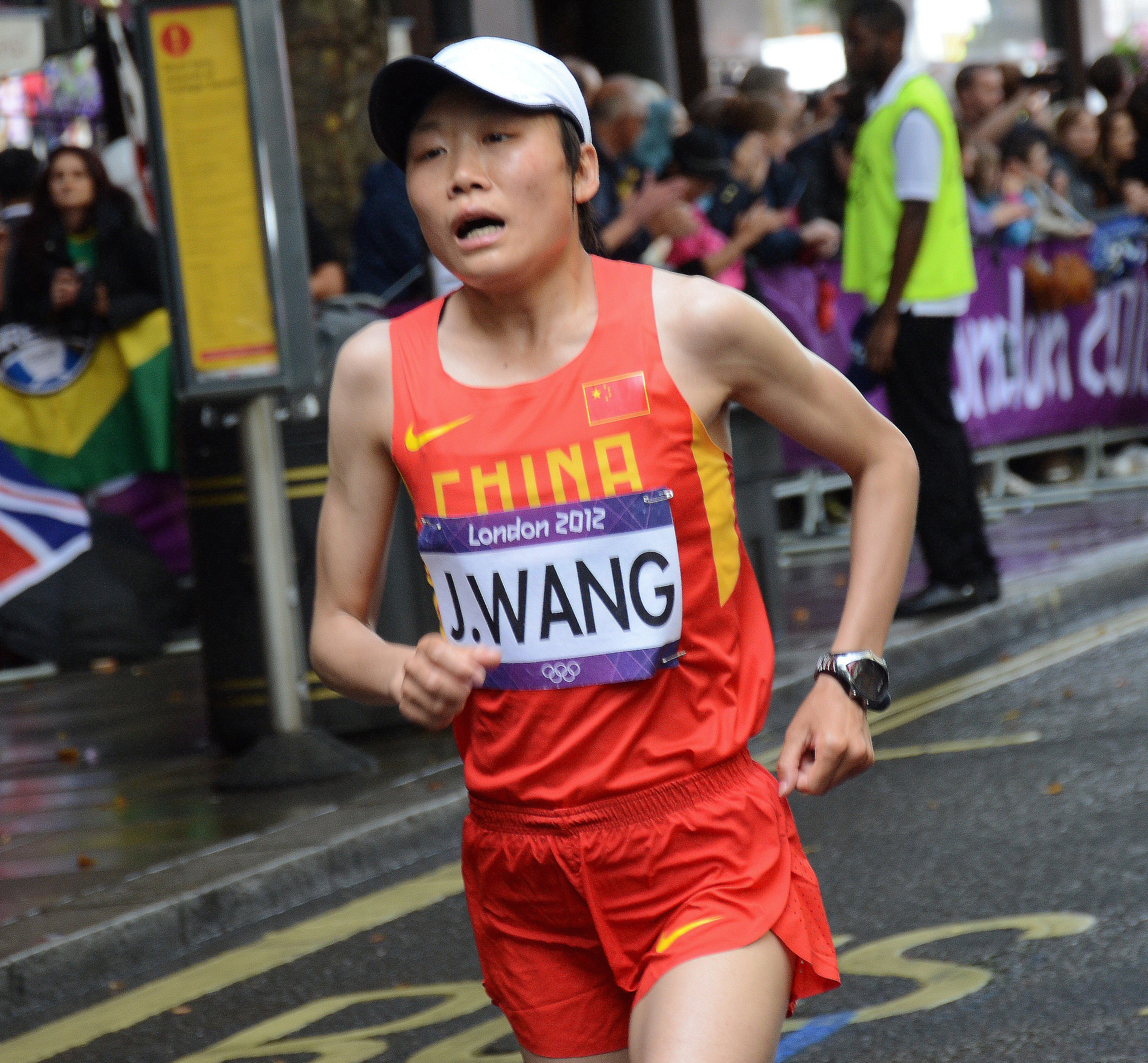
- Wang Jiali in the 2012 Summer Olympics marathon

Personal information
- Born: February 1, 1986 (age 40)
- Height: 1.6 m (5 ft 3 in)
- Weight: 50 kg (110 lb)

Sport
- Country: China
- Sport: Athletics
- Event: Marathon
Medal record
Asian Championships
Bronze medal – third place	2009 Guangzhou	10,000 m
World University Games
Silver medal – second place	2025 Bochum	Half marathon team

Wang Jiali (simplified Chinese: 王佳丽; traditional Chinese: 王佳麗; pinyin: Wáng Jiālì, born 1 February 1986 in Hebei) is a Chinese long-distance runner who specialises in marathon running. She has won marathons in Zhengzhou and Beijing, as well as having won a bronze medal from the Asian Athletics Championships.

Her first major marathon appearance came at the 2007 Beijing International Marathon, but she did not managed to make the top ten. She set a personal best of 2:26:34 to win the Zhengzhou-Kaifeng International Marathon in March 2008, a mark which ranked her as the fifth fastest Chinese woman that year. Her next marathon outing came in April at the Good Luck Beijing test event for the upcoming 2008 Olympic marathon, and although she was among the leaders for much of the race, she dropped out and failed to finish. Wang returned to the Beijing Marathon in October and took seventh place in a race dominated by her compatriot Bai Xue.

Wang had a podium finish at the 2009 Xiamen International Marathon, coming third as part of a Chinese sweep of the medals along with Chen Rong and Zhang Yingying. At the Dalian International Marathon she took second place behind Zhu Yingying in the women's race. As a result of these performances, she was selected as a back-up runner for the Chinese marathon squad at the 2009 World Championships in Athletics, but ultimately she did not compete. In November that year she did compete at the 2009 Asian Athletics Championships and she earned a bronze medal on home turf in the 10,000 metres, finishing behind Bai Xue and Kavita Raut.

She entered the Nagoya Women's Marathon but had a poor performance, crossing the line after more than two hours and forty minutes to finish in twentieth place. She took fourth in Dalian the following month. Despite a disappointing start to the season, she went on to take a major win in October at the Beijing Marathon. She pushed ahead of Chen Rong to take the title in a time of 2:29:31– her second fastest ever run. She was the first Chinese home at the Xiamen Marathon, taking third place on the podium.

She was banned from competition for two years due to abnormalities in her biological passport. Her ban began in December 2013. On January 10, 2018, Wang Jiali faces a second ban for eight years, after failing at an anti-doping test for the second time.
