= Gashaw =

Gashaw (Amharic: ጋሻው) can be both a masculine given name and a patronymic. Notable people with the name include:

- Gashaw Asfaw (born 1978), Ethiopian long-distance runner
- Tigist Gashaw (born 1996), Ethiopian-born middle-distance runner

== See also ==
- Gashau Ayale (born 1996), Ethiopian-born Israeli marathon runner
