= Moiben (disambiguation) =

Moiben is the principal town of Moiben Constituency.

Moiben may also refer to:

- Moiben Constituency, an area of Uasin Gishu County in Kenya

== Surname ==
- James Moiben (born 1977), Kenyan marathon runner and winner of the 2004 Beijing Marathon
- Laban Moiben (born 1983), Kenyan marathon runner and three-time winner of the Los Angeles Marathon
