= Track and field at the 2011 Military World Games – Women's marathon =

The women's marathon event at the 2011 Military World Games was held on 17 July at the Estádio Olímpico João Havelange.

== Records ==
Prior to this competition, the existing world and CISM record were as follows:

World Record	Paula Radcliffe (GBR)	2:15:25	London, Great Britain	13 April 2003
CISM World Record	Rosaria Console (ITA)	2:30:44	Carpi, Italy	12 October 2008

== Schedule ==
Date	Time	Round
17 July 2011	7:00	Final

== Medalists ==
Gold	Silver	Bronze
Kim Kum-Ok; North Korea	Wei Yanan; China	Helalia Johannes; Namibia

== Results ==
Rank	Name	Nationality	Time	Notes
1st place, gold medalist(s)	Kim Kum-Ok	North Korea	2:35:22	
2nd place, silver medalist(s)	Wei Yanan	China	2:36:19	
3rd place, bronze medalist(s)	Helalia Johannes	Namibia	2:37:15	
4	Winfrida Kwamboka Nyansikera	Kenya	2:39:49	
5	Monika Drybulska	Poland	2:50:47	
6	Épiphanie Nyirabaramé	Rwanda	2:51:58	
7	Denise Campos	Brazil	2:52:05	
8	Helene Willix	Sweden	2:52:38	
9	Gisele de Jesus	Brazil	2:53:33	
10	Cornelia Schindler	Germany	2:55:45	
11	Ksenija Bubnjević	Serbia	3:16:32	
12	Karen Kaizer	Canada	3:23:31	
	Gina Marie Slaby	United States	DNF	
	Rasa Drazdauskaite	Lithuania	DNS	
	Lineo Lebotha	Lesotho	DNS	
	Chuan Luo	China	DNS	
	Jacqueline Sakilu	Tanzania	DNS	
