= Zhu Xiaolin =

Chinese long-distance runner

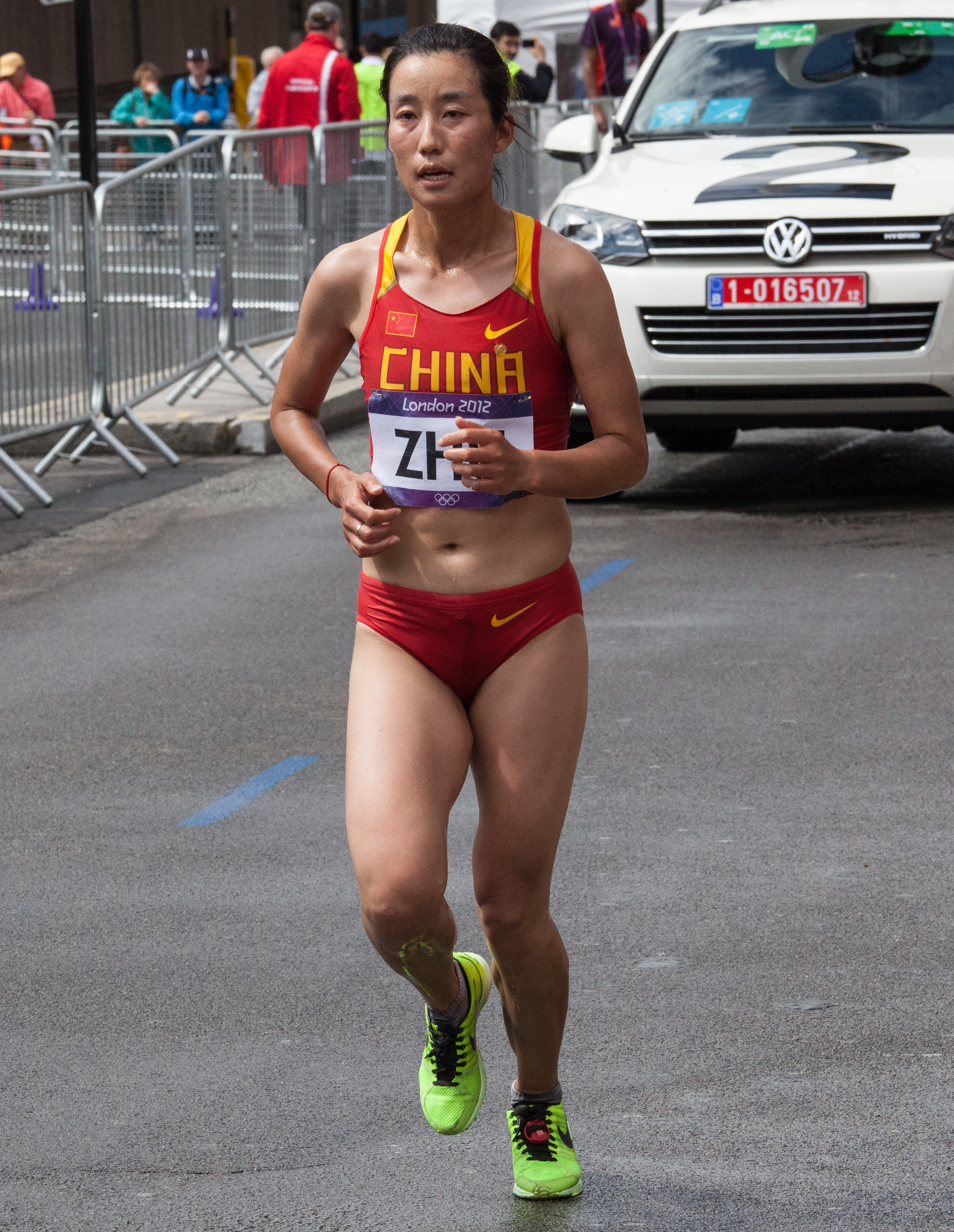
- Zhu Xiaolin in the Marathon at the 2012 Olympics in London

Personal information
- Full name: 朱 晓琳
- Nationality: China
- Born: 20 February 1984 (age 42) Xiuyan, Liaoning
- Height: 1.68 m (5 ft 6 in)
- Weight: 50 kg (110 lb)

Sport
- Sport: Running
- Event: Marathon
Medal record
Women's athletics
Representing China
Asian Indoor Championships
Gold medal – first place	2006 Pattaya	3000 m

Zhu Xiaolin (born 20 February 1984) is a female Chinese long-distance runner, who specialises in marathons. She has won the Xiamen International Marathon and was third at the 2010 Rotterdam Marathon. She represented China at the 2008 Beijing Olympics and was fourth in the women's marathon. Zhu has also competed at the World Championships in Athletics, where she finished in the top five in the marathon in both 2007 and 2009. Her personal best over the distance is 2 hours and 23:57 minutes.

In 2005, she was sixth at the Beijing Marathon and travelled to Nanjing to take part in the 10th Chinese National Games soon after. She finished as runner-up in the women's 5000 metres behind Xing Huina, making a 36-second improvement to her personal best to secure the silver medal. Early the following year, she competed at the 2006 Asian Indoor Athletics Championships and ran a championship record time of 9:25.60 to win the gold medal over 3000 metres.

She won at the Yangzhou Half Marathon in April 2007. Zhu finished fourth at the 2007 World Championships marathon. In the following year she achieved the same result, finishing fourth in the 2008 Olympics Marathon. In 2009 Zhu Xiaolin took part in the 2009 World Championships Marathon, resulting in a fifth place in 2:26:08 this time.

She entered the 2010 Stramilano Half Marathon and took second place behind Jane Kiptoo but set a personal best time of 1:10:07. She took part in the 2010 Rotterdam Marathon shortly afterwards and finished in third place in 2:29:42. She won the Amatrice-Configno road race in August, beating compatriot Jia Chaofeng.

== Personal bests ==
- 1500 metres - 4:12.73 min (2005)
- 5000 metres - 15:22.35 min (2005)
- 10,000 metres - 31:53.96 min (2010)
- Half marathon – 1:10:07 hrs (2010)
- Marathon - 2:23:57 hrs (2002)

== International competitions ==
Representing China
Year	Competition	Venue	Position	Event	Notes
2002	Beijing International Women's Ekiden	Beijing, China	1st	Leg 5	15:40
2006	Asian Indoor Championships	Pattaya, Thailand	1st	3000 m	9:25.60
2007	World Championships	Osaka, Japan	4th	Marathon	2:31:21
2007	World Marathon Cup	Osaka, Japan	2nd	Team	7:35:52
2008	Olympic Games	Beijing, China	4th	Marathon	2:27:16
2009	World Championships	Berlin, Germany	5th	Marathon	2:26:08
2009	World Marathon Cup	Berlin, Germany	1st	Team	7:17:02
2010	World Half Marathon Championships	Nanning, China	8th	Half marathon	1:11:01
2010	World Half Marathon Championships	Nanning, China	8th	Team	3:47:05
2010	Asian Games	Guangzhou, China	2nd	Marathon	2:26:35
2011	World Championships	Daegu, South Korea	6th	Marathon	2:29:58
2011	World Marathon Cup	Daegu, South Korea	2nd	Team	7:31:34
2012	Olympic Games	London, United Kingdom	6th	Marathon	2:24:48

== Professional races ==
Year	Competition	Venue	Position	Notes
Representing China
2002	Dalian Marathon	Dalian, China	1st	2:42:56
2002	Jinan Marathon	Jinan, China	5th	2:51:12
2002	Beijing Marathon	Beijing, China	4th	2:23:57
2004	Hong Kong Marathon	Hong Kong, China	8th	2:58:01
2004	Xiamen Marathon	Xiamen, China	21st	2:41:04
2004	Dalian Marathon	Dalian, China	9th	2:44:48
2005	Xiamen Marathon	Xiamen, China	9th	2:35:04
2005	Beijing Marathon	Beijing, China	6th	2:32:27
2006	Xiamen Marathon	Xiamen, China	2nd	2:28:27
2006	Dalian Marathon	Dalian, China	1st	2:45:57
2007	Xiamen Marathon	Xiamen, China	1st	2:26:08
2007	Yangzhou Jianzhen International Half Marathon	Yangzhou, China	1st	1:13:25
2009	Udine Half Marathon	Udine, Italy	2nd	1:11:11
2009	Beijing Marathon	Beijing, China	3rd	2:34:55
2010	Stramilano Half Marathon	Milan, Italy	2nd	1:10:07
2010	Rotterdam Marathon	Rotterdam, Netherlands	3rd	2:29:42
2010	Amatrice-Configno 8.5K	Province of Rieti, Italy	1st	27:51
2010	Portugal Half Marathon	Lisbon, Portugal	5th	1:13:27
2011	Paris Half Marathon	Paris, France	4th	1:10:28
2011	London Marathon	London, United Kingdom	12th	2:26:28
2012	Chongqing Marathon	Chongqing, China	3rd	2:24:19

== National competitions ==
- Chinese Athletics Championships
  - 5000 m: 4th (2002), 3rd (2006)
  - 10,000 m: 8th (2002), 17th (2005), 4th (2009)
- China City Games
  - 10,000 m: 2nd (2003)
- National Games of China
  - 5000 m: 2nd (2005)
  - 10,000 m: 6th (2009), 17th (2013)
  - Marathon team: 3rd (2013)
- Chinese Cross Country Championships
  - Women's race: 6th (2006)
