= Athletics at the 2005 National Games of China =

Athletics at the 10th National Games of China
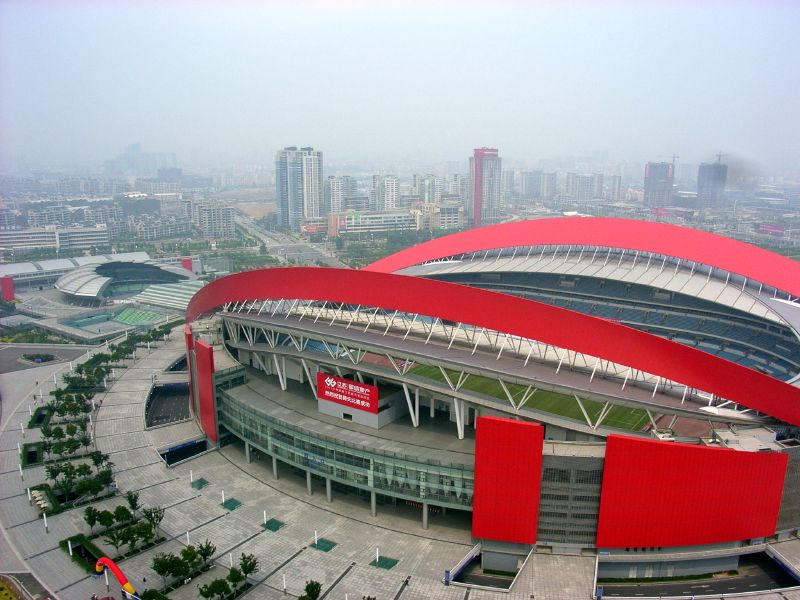
- The main stadium for the competition
- Dates: 17 – 22 October 2005
- Host city: Jiangsu, PR China
- Venue: Nanjing Olympic Sports Center
- Events: 46
- Records set: Games records

At the 2005 National Games of China, the athletics events were held at the Nanjing Olympic Sports Center in Nanjing, Jiangsu Province, PR China from 17 to 22 October 2005. A total of 46 events were contested, 24 by male and 22 by female athletes. The National Games marathon race was held before the main competition, as it was incorporated into that year's Beijing Marathon on 16 October.

Twenty-eight teams (representing regions or other bodies) reached the medal table, as did a number of individual athletes. Shandong topped the medal and points table with nine gold medals and twenty in total, while runner-up Jiangsu matched that haul but won seven golds. Shanxi took third in the medal table with five gold medals, although Guangdong and Liaoning placed third and fourth in the more comprehensive points table system.

The event was seen as a key step towards preparing China's athletes for the 2008 Summer Olympics. Xing Huina completed a double in the women's 5000 metres and 10,000 metres and would have had a third in the 1500 metres but she was disqualified for elbowing Liu Qing (who herself completed a double having won the 800 metres). The top two from the women's marathon – Sun Yingjie and Zhou Chunxiu – flew in from Beijing the day before the 10,000 m but still managed second and third place, respectively. The result did not stand, however, as Sun failed a drugs test for androsterone. Her test at the Beijing Marathon the previous day was negative but, in spite of a civil court ruling a rival athlete had spiked her drink, she was disqualified and banned for two years.

Liu Xiang, the 2004 Olympic champion in the 110 metres hurdles, was one of the biggest draws of the games and he beat Shi Dongpeng, winning the gold in a world-class time. Huang Xiaoxiao won golds in both the 400 metres dash and 400 metres hurdles, although hurdles silver medallist Wang Xing received as much as attention as she knocked three tenths of a second off the world junior record. Qin Wangping took a women's 100 metres/200 metres sprint double, beating Liu Li on both occasions. Two men broke senior records en route to victory: Meng Yan set Chinese record in the men's 400 m hurdles while Yu Chaohong set an Asian record in the men's 50 km race walk.

== Records ==
Name	Event	Region	Record	Type
Yu Chaohong	Men' s 50 km race walk	Yunnan	3:36:06	AR
Wang Xing	Women's 400 metres hurdles	Hunan	54.40	WJR
Meng Yan	Men's 400 metres hurdles	Hunan	49.19	NR
Key:WR — World record • AR — Area record • WJR — World junior record • NR — National record

== Medal summary ==
=== Men ===
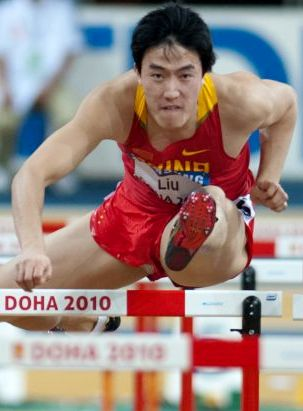
Liu Xiang took hurdles gold and a relay silver for Shanghai.

Event	Gold		Silver		Bronze	
100 metres	Gong Wei; Guangxi	10.24	Hu Kai; Individual	10.31	Pang Guibin; Guangxi	10.32
200 metres	Yang Yaozu; Shanghai	20.73	Wang Chengliang; Chinese Army	21.11	Deng Yijun; Hong Kong	21.15
400 metres	Wang Liangyu; Guangdong	46.15 PB	Wang Xiaoxu; Beijing	46.44	Tan Biao; Guangdong	46.66
800 metres	Li Xiangyu; Shanxi	1:48.21	Li Guangming; Hubei	1:49.26	Tang Baojun; Shanghai	1:49.58
1500 metres	Dou Zhaobo; Shandong	3:40.88	Tang Baojun; Shanghai	3:41.10 PB	Yang Anyue; Yunnan	3:44.54
5000 metres	Sun Wenyong; Shandong	13:58.02	Chen Mingfu; Yunnan	13:58.84	Zhengkai; Shandong	13:59.23
10,000 metres	Chen Mingfu; Yunnan	28:16.40 PB	Du Pengyuan; Guangdong	28:29.37 PB	Han Gang; Yunnan	28:35.73 PB
110 metres hurdles	Liu Xiang; Shanghai	13.10	Shi Dongpeng; Hebei	13.44	Chen Ming; Tianjin	13.70 PB
400 metres hurdles	Meng Yan; Jilin	49.19 NR	Zhang Shibao; Shandong	49.75	Zhu Zhi; Guangdong	49.88 PB
3000 metres steeplechase	Sun Wenli; Shandong	8:32.36	Sun Wenyong; Shandong	8:33.37 PB	Shi Linzhong; Jiangsu	8:33.94 PB
4×100 metres relay	Guangxi; Yang Guangming; Pang Guibin; Zhang Yuan; Gong Wei	39.41	Shanghai; Hu Meng; Xu Yaoting; Yang Yaozu; Liu Xiang	39.65	Guangdong; Zhao Haohuan; Cao Jian; Huang Lin; Wen Yongyi	39.72
4×400 metres relay	Guangdong; Xu Zizhou; Tan Biao; Wang Youxin; Wang Liangyu	3:06.97	Fujian; Lu Chunsheng; Chen Zhiwei; Yang Jie; Chen Xiaochuan	3:08.79	Jiangsu; Luo Xuesheng; Hu Rui; Wang Haibin; Liu Yanbing	3:09.84
Marathon	Zhang Qingle; Jiangsu	2:15:06	Li Zhuhong; Gansu	2:16:06	Su Wei; Qinghai	2:16:26
20 km walk	Li Gaobo; Jiangsu	1:18:22	Zhu Hongjun; Liaoning	1:19:00	Yu Chaohong; Yunnan	1:19:08
50 km walk	Yu Chaohong; Yunnan	3:36:06 AR	Zhao Chengliang; Yunnan	3:36:13 PB	Gadasu Alatan; Inner Mongolia	3:40:23 PB
High jump	Zhang Shufeng; Heilongjiang	2.24 m	Liang Tong; Beijing	2.21 m	Huang Haiqiang; Zhejiang	2.18 m
Pole vault	Liu Feiliang; Shandong	5.60 m	Yang Yansheng; Shandong	5.45 m PB	Zhang Hongwei; Chinese Army	5.40 m
Long jump	Zhang Xin; Tianjin	7.99 m PB	Li Runrun; Jiangsu	7.89 m PB	Gu Junjie; Sichuan	7.86 m
Triple jump	Li Yanxi; Hebei	16.95 m	Lin Mujie; Fujian	16.50 m	Li Ming; Xinjiang	16.46 m PB
Shot put	Zhang Qi; Shanxi	20.15 m NR	Tian Yingchun; Heilongjiang	19.25 m PB	Jia Peng; Liaoning	18.99 m
Discus throw	Li Shaojie; Shandong	62.85 m	Wu Tao; Liaoning	61.91 m	Tulake Nuermaimaiti; Xinjiang	59.60 m
Hammer throw	Ye Kuigang; Chinese Army	71.93 m	Liu Fuxiang; Hainan	70.33 m	Qi Dakai; Shaanxi	67.35 m
Javelin throw	Li Rongxiang; Zhejiang	81.06 m	Chen Qi; Shanghai	78.99 m	Liu Yanhong; Henan	77.09 m
Decathlon	Qi Haifeng; Liaoning	7854 pts	Yu Bin; Sichuan	7705 pts	Hong Qingyang; Zhejiang	7452 pts

=== Women ===
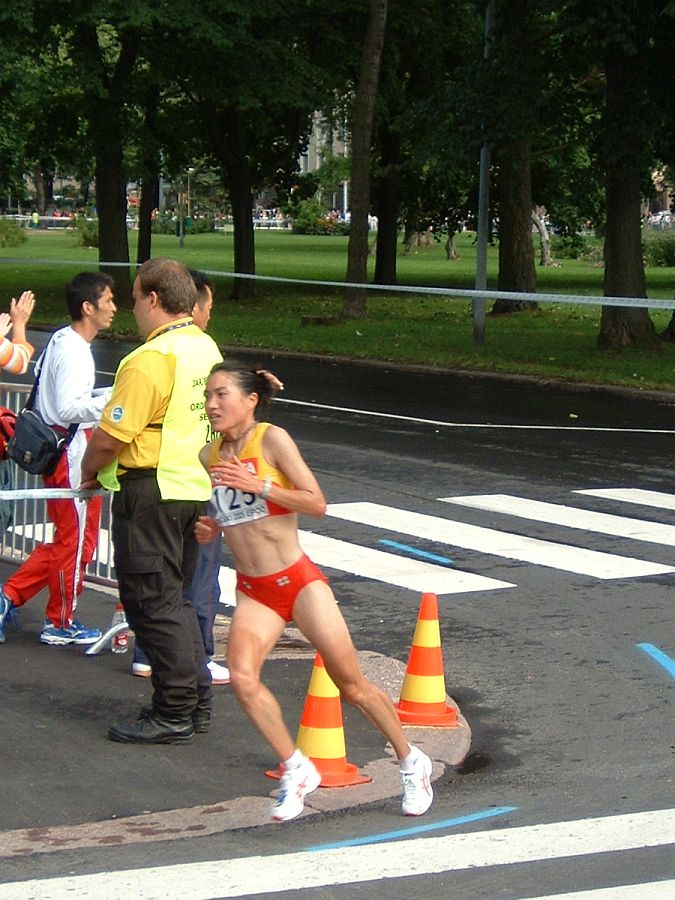
Jiangsu runner Zhou Chunxiu won silver medals in the 10,000 m and marathon.

Event	Gold		Silver		Bronze	
100 metres (wind: 1.9 m/s)	Qin Wangping; Jiangsu	11.34	Liu Li; Heilongjiang	11.51 PB	Chen Lisha; Individual	11.55
200 metres	Qin Wangping; Jiangsu	23.50	Liu Li; Heilongjiang	23.69	Ren Xiufen; Shandong	23.95
400 metres	Huang Xiaoxiao; Shandong	51.95	Pu Fanfang; Shandong	52.34	Zhang Xiaoyuan; Shandong	52.65 PB
800 metres	Liu Qing; Shanxi	1:59.74 PB	Yang Xiaocui; Guangdong	2:02.64 PB	Yang Wei; Jiangsu	2:02.83
1500 metres	Liu Qing; Shanxi	4:04.00 PB	Huangjing; Shandong	4:10.13 PB	Xie Sainan; Jiangsu	4:11.11
5000 metres	Xing Huina; Shandong	15:20.09	Zhu Xiaolin; Liaoning	15:22.35 PB	Xi Qiuhong; Beijing	15:25.36 PB
10,000 metres	Xing Huina; Shandong	31:00.73	Zhou Chunxiu; Jiangsu	31:09.03 PB	Bao Guiying; Gansu	31:27.35 PB
100 metres hurdles	Liu Jing; Sichuan	12.96	Su Yiping; Jiangsu	13.05	Feng Yun; Guangdong	13.08
400 metres hurdles	Huang Xiaoxiao; Shandong	54.18 PB	Wang Xing; Hunan	54.40 WJR/PB	Zhang Rongrong; Individual	55.91 PB
4×100 metres relay	Jiangsu; Chen Jue; Liang Yi; Jiang Zhiying; Qin Wangping	44.19	Guangxi; Huang Nongfen; Yan Jiankui; Huang Mei; Han Ling	44.25	Heilongjiang; Zou Xinyu; Li Chunhong; Wang Guanjun; Liu Li	44.67
4×400 metres relay	Guangdong; Zhong Shaoting; Yang Xiaocui; Gao Lihua; Tang Xiaoyin	3:30.51	Shandong; Huang Xiaoxiao; Chen Yuxiang; Hou Xiufen; Bu Fanfang	3:30.63	Hunan; Huan Li; Liu Yu; Song Yinglan; Wang Xing	3:37.17
Marathon	Sun Yingjie; Railway	2:21:01	Zhou Chunxiu; Jiangsu	2:21:11	Sun Weiwei; Liaoning	2:27:35
20 km walk	Bai Yanmin; Jiangsu	1:27:37 PB	Jiang Jing; Jiangsu	1:28:14	Shi Na; Shandong	1:28:24
High jump	Jing Xuezhu; Beijing	1.92 m	Gu Biwei; Zhejiang	1.90 m PB	Gu Xuan; Chinese Army	1.84 m PB
Pole vault	Zhao Yingying; Zhejiang	4.40 m AJR=	Yang Jing; Guangdong	4.40 m PB	Gao Shuying; Shanghai	4.30 m
Long jump	Guan Yingnan; Jiangsu	6.65 m	Zhang Yuan; Guangdong	6.50 m PB	Liu Huahua; Hunan	6.47 m
Triple jump	Huang Qiuyan; Guangxi	14.54 m	Wang Yin; Individual	13.96 m	Wu Lingmei; Guangdong	13.92 m
Shot put	Li Meiju; Hebei	18.88 m	Li Ling; Liaoning	18.68 m PB	Qian Chunhua; Jiangsu	18.58 m PB
Discus throw	Li Qiumei; Shanxi	64.89 m	Huang Qun; Jiangsu	64.53 m PB	Song Aimin; Hebei	63.40 m
Hammer throw	Liu Yinghui; Individual	72.17 m	Zhang Wenxiu; Chinese Army	71.84 m	Yang Meiping; Jiangsu	68.09 m
Javelin throw	Ma Ning; Hebei	60.64 m	Xue Juan; Jiangsu	59.87 m	Geng Aihua; Shandong	59.04 m PB
Heptathlon	Shen Shengfei; Zhejiang	6165 pts	Liu Haili; Liaoning	6132 pts	Wang Hailan; Hainan	6128 pts

== Medal table ==
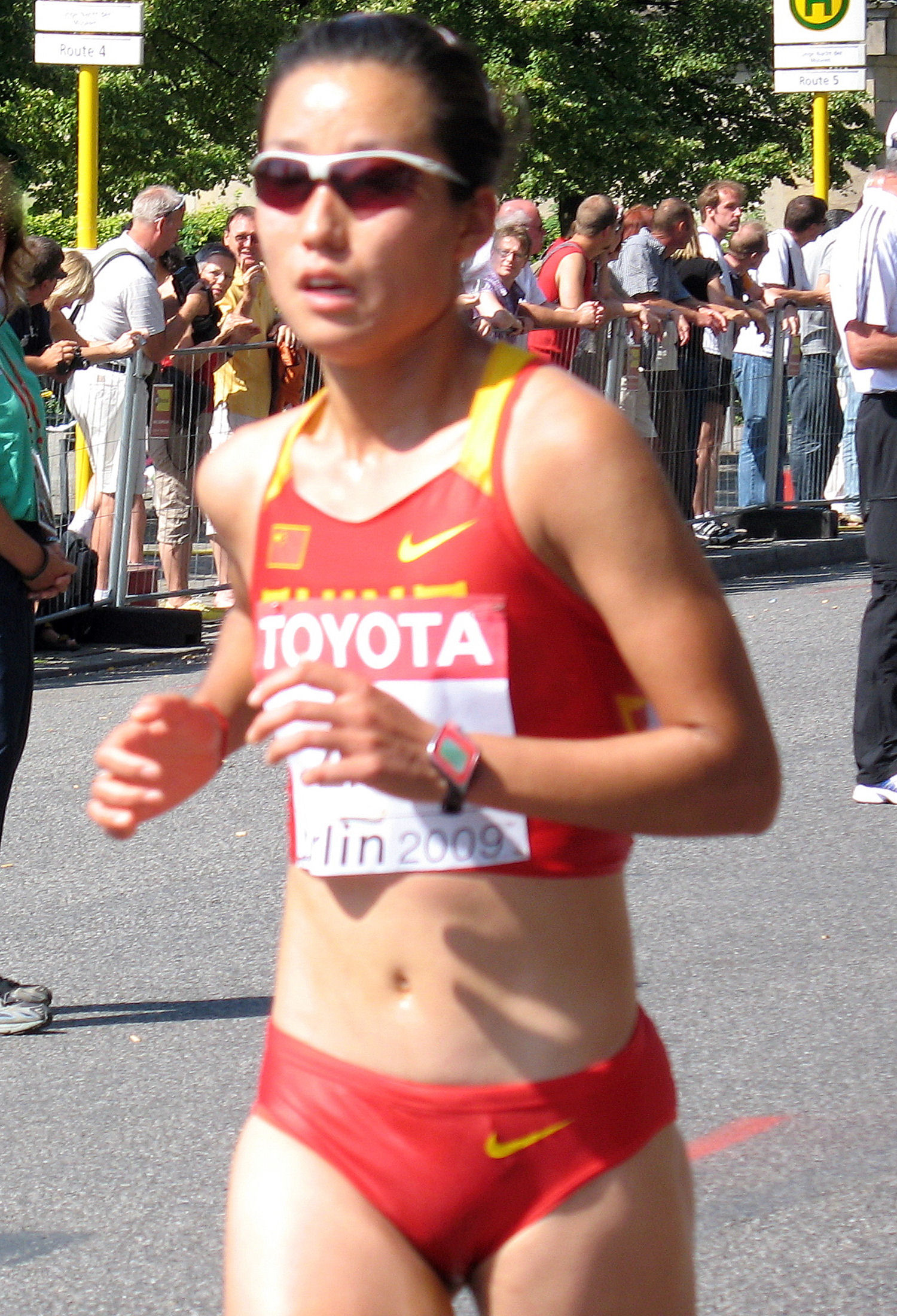
Zhu Xiaolin won the 5000 m silver medal for Liaoning.

* Host nation (Host Region (Jiangsu))

Rank	Team	Gold	Silver	Bronze	Total
1	Shandong	9	6	5	20
2	Jiangsu*	7	7	6	20
3	Shanxi	5	0	0	5
4	Guangdong	3	4	5	12
5	Zhejiang	3	1	2	6
6	Guangxi	3	1	1	5
6	Hebei	3	1	1	5
8	Shanghai	2	3	2	7
9	Yunnan	2	2	3	7
10	Liaoning	1	5	2	8
11	Heilongjiang	1	3	1	5
12	Individual †	1	2	2	5
12	People's Liberation Army	1	2	2	5
14	Beijing	1	2	1	4
15	Sichuan	1	1	1	3
16	Tianjin	1	0	1	2
17	Jilin	1	0	0	1
17	Railway	1	0	0	1
19	Fujian	0	2	0	2
20	Hunan	0	1	2	3
21	Gansu	0	1	1	2
21	Hainan	0	1	1	2
23	Hubei	0	1	0	1
24	Xinjiang	0	0	2	2
25	Henan	0	0	1	1
25	Hong Kong	0	0	1	1
25	Inner Mongolia	0	0	1	1
25	Qinghai	0	0	1	1
25	Shaanxi	0	0	1	1
Totals (29 entries)		46	46	46	138

- † = Athletes competing without a team
