= Stephen Kwelio Chemlany =

Kenyan marathon runner

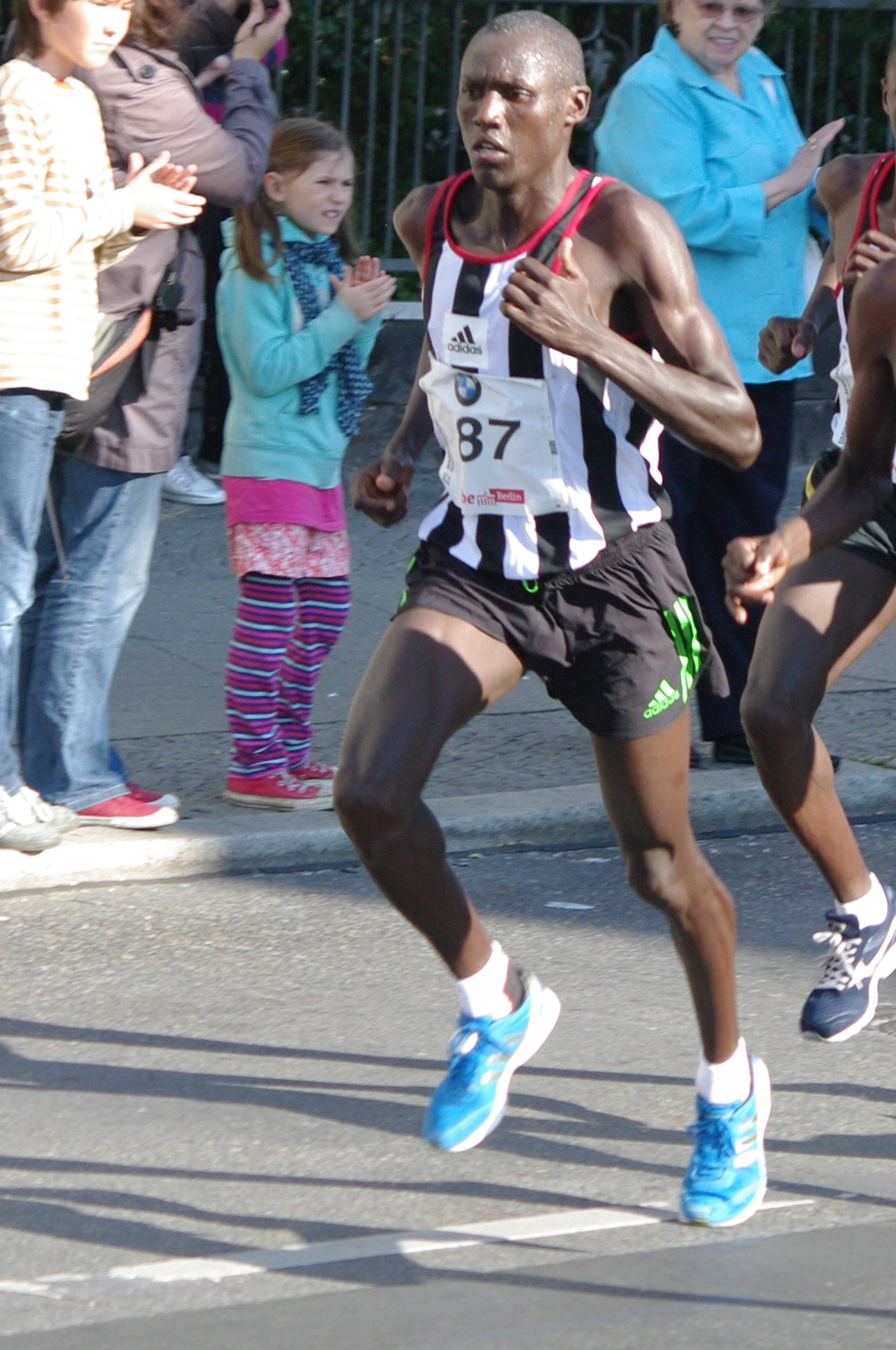
- Chemlany running as pacemaker at the 2011 Berlin Marathon

Personal information
- Full name: Stephen Kwelio Chemlany
- Nationality: Kenyan
- Born: 9 August 1982 (age 44) Kapsokwony, Western Province, Kenya
- Education: Iona College

Sport
- Country: Kenya
- Sport: Athletics
- Events: Long-distance, Marathon
- Club: Westchester Track Club

Achievements and titles
- Personal bests: Half marathon: 1:01:33 (2013); Marathon: 2:06:24 (2014)
Medal record
Men's athletics
Representing Kenya
Commonwealth Games
Silver medal – second place	2014 Glasgow	Athletics
Marathons
Gold medal – first place	2010 Dalian	Marathon
Gold medal – first place	2011 Tiberias	Marathon
Gold medal – first place	2011 Dalian	Marathon
Gold medal – first place	2011 Macau	Marathon
Silver medal – second place	2010 Macau	Marathon
Silver medal – second place	2011 Berlin	Marathon
Silver medal – second place	2014 Seoul	Marathon
Bronze medal – third place	2013 Rome	Marathon
Bronze medal – third place	2013 Shanghai	Marathon

Stephen Kwelio Chemlany (born 9 August 1982) is a Kenyan long-distance runner who competes in the marathon. He has a personal best of 2:06:24 hours for the event.

Chemlany was runner-up at the 2011 Berlin Marathon and came fourth at the 2013 Berlin Marathon. He has won the Dalian Marathon (twice), the Tiberias Marathon and the Macau Marathon. He gained a master's degree in computer science from Iona College in the United States in 2008 and represented the school athletically.

== Career ==
=== Early life and career ===
Born in Kapsokwony in Kenya's Western Province, he studied abroad at Iona College in New York. While studying for a degree in computer science he also competed collegiately for the Iona Gaels team. He appeared three times at the NCAA Men's Cross Country Championship, with his best finish of 33rd place coming in 2004. He won back-to-back Metro Atlantic Athletic Conference indoor titles in the 3000 metres and 5000 metres from 2005 to 2006. His sole outing at the NCAA Men's Outdoor Track and Field Championships saw him finish twelfth in the 5000 m in 2006. He completed his degree in 2006 and continued on to get a master's degree in computer science from Iona College in 2008. He met Emily Chelanga (another Kenyan athlete) in New York and the pair had their first child, Faith, around 2006.

After finishing his first degree, Chemlany began to compete in road running events. Running for Westchester Track Club, he came first in the New York Road Runners road mile championship in 2007. He came eleventh at the Healthy Kidney 10K and ran a time of 67:19 minutes at the Virginia Beach Half Marathon in September. After graduating from Iona in 2008, he ran a half marathon best of 64:39 minutes in Hartford, Connecticut and, on his marathon debut, came second at the St. Jude Marathon in 2:20:57 hours. His performances improved in 2009: he was fifth at the Healthy Kidney 10K and the Cherry Blossom 10-miler. He won the Virginia Beach half marathon in a new best time of 62:56 minutes. Over the marathon distance, he came third at the Mississippi Blues Marathon, fifth in Jacksonville, Florida, then ran a personal best of 2:16:14 hours to finish fourth at the Country Music Marathon.

=== Professional marathon running ===
Having seen elite American runners travel to Kenya for high altitude training, he decided to return to his native Kenya to improve his running. This also made economic sense for the runner: "In the US, one needs to work alongside training to survive because it’s too expensive, especially in New York, and I wanted to focus on my training". Chemlany had three marathon outings in 2010 and his times were again improved: he ran 2:13:23 horus for sixth at the Tiberias Marathon and in April won his first race with a time of 2:13:10 at the Dalian Marathon. H was also runner-up at the Macau Marathon at the end of the year. A run of 2:10:02 was enough to win the 2011 Tiberias Marathon and he retained his title in Dalian. Given his performances, he was invited to run as a pacemaker for the top level 2011 Berlin Marathon. Initially tasked with leading runners up to the 30 km mark at world record pace, he continued after that point. The winner Patrick Makau broke the world record and Chemlany was next to finish, recording a significant improvement upon his past times with a run of 2:07:55 hours. He ended the year with a win at the Macau Marathon.

His two races in 2012 did not match the performances of the previous year as he was fifth at the Rotterdam Marathon and seventh at the Shanghai Marathon (slower than two hours, ten minutes on both occasions). His 2013 began with a better outing, as he was third at the Rome Marathon in 2:08:30 hours. A new personal best of 2:07:44 hours came at the 2013 Berlin Marathon, although the race was even faster in that year as the world record was broken by Wilson Kipsang and Chemlany's time was enough for fourth only. He reached the podium again at the Shanghai Marathon, coming third. The Seoul International Marathon in March 2014 was a venue for further improvement, to 2:06:24 hours, and he was runner-up to Ethiopia's Yacob Jarso.

== Personal bests ==
- 1500 metres – 3:46.29 (2006)
- Mile run (road) – 4:05.6h (2007)
- 3000 metres (indoor) – 8:14.75 (2005)
- 5000 metres – 14:03.89 (2006)
- 10,000 metres – 29:17.89 (2006)
- 10K run – 28:41 (2009)
- Half marathon – 1:01:33 (2013)
- Marathon – 2:06:24 (2014)
