= Chen Rong (athlete) =

Chinese long-distance runner

Chen Rong (born 18 May 1988 in Hebei) is a Chinese long-distance runner who specializes in the marathon. She was selected to represent her country at the 2008 Summer Olympics, but did not compete.

Her first major victory in the marathon came in 2007, when she won at the Beijing International Marathon, setting a personal best time of 2:27:05. She won the Xiamen International Marathon in 2009 with a time of 2:29:52. Chen took her first win at the Dalian Marathon in 2010, completing the distance in 2:30:09. She was the runner-up at the Beijing Marathon later that year, making it a Chinese 1–2 with race winner Wang Jiali.

In 2011, she attempted to retain her title at the Dalian Marathon. Although she was beaten by Wang Jiali, she set a new personal best of 2:26:49 hours to take second place. She was selected for the 2011 World Championships in Athletics in Daegu as a result and gave her best international performance to date, finishing eleventh in a time of 2:31:11 hours. That September she ran a new best for the 10,000 metres, completing the distance in 31:39.77 minutes.

== Personal bests ==
- 1500 metres - 4:25.45 min (2005)
- 3000 metres - 9:20.19 min (2005)
- 5000 metres - 15:38.66 min (2007)
- 10,000 metres - 31:39.77 min (2011)
- Half marathon - 1:12:56 hrs (2007)
- Marathon - 2:26:49 hrs (2011)
