= Dalian International Marathon =

Road running event in Dalian, China

- Date: Mid-May
- Location: Dalian, China
- Event type: Road
- Distance: Marathon, Half marathon, 4.2km run
- Primary sponsor: ICBC
- Established: 1987
- Course records: Men's: 2:09:44 (2018) (Kenya) Edwin Koech; Women's: 2:26:12 (2011) (China) Wang Jiali
- Website: Dalian International Marathon

The Dalian International Marathon is an annual marathon held in Dalian, China. It is recognized by IRRA and China Athletic Association of Road Running Committee. It was first held in 1987, making it one of the oldest races in China.

In 2015 30,000 runners took part, with 25 elite runners. The prize for the winner was $30,000, with the runner up receiving $20,000.

The 2020 edition of the race was postponed due to the COVID-19 pandemic.

== Winners ==
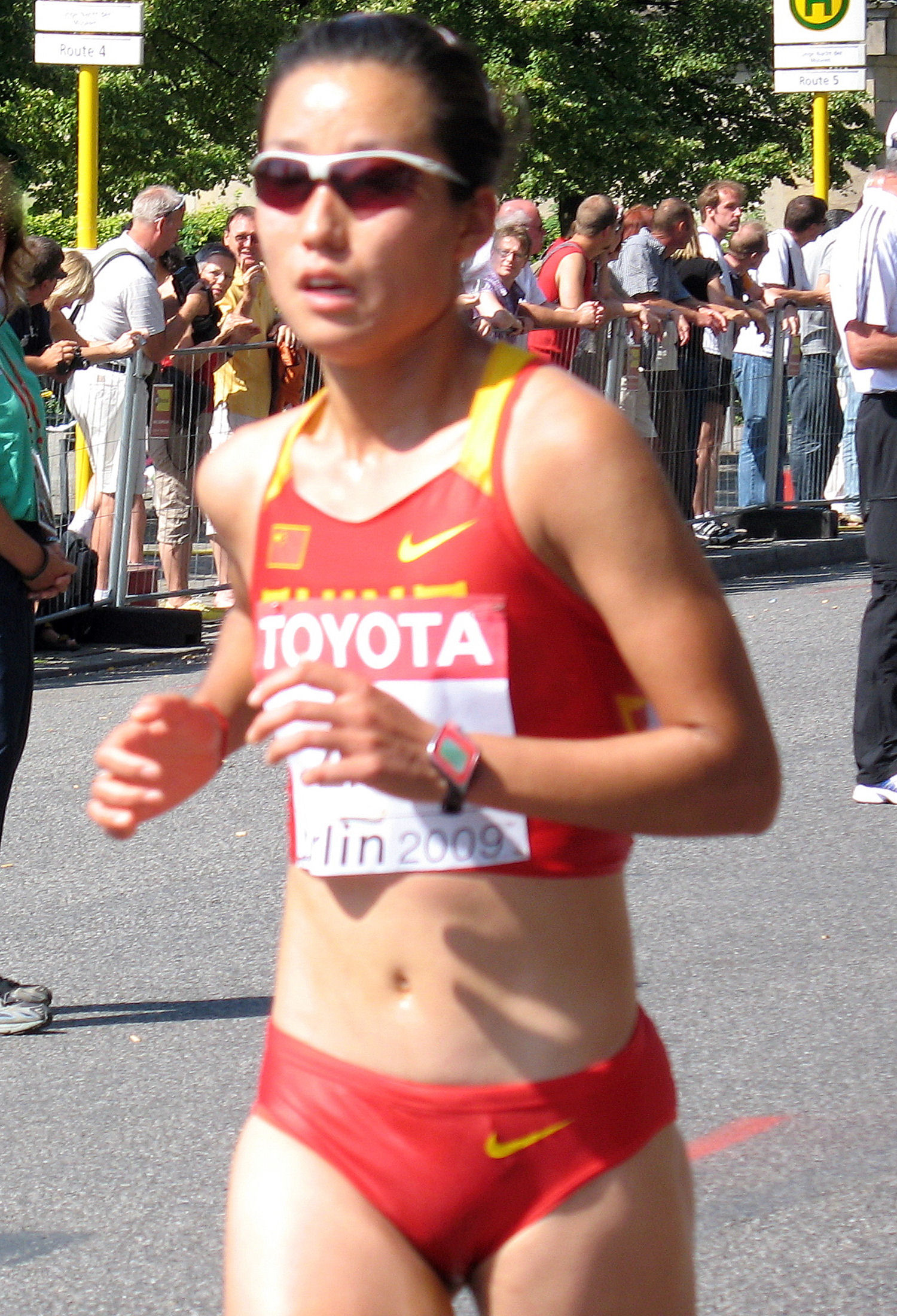
Zhu Xiaolin is a three-time winner of the women's race.

Key: Course record

Edition	Year	Men	Time (h:m:s)	Women	Time (h:m:s)
–	2021	Was not held due to COVID-19 pandemic			
–	2020	Was not held due to COVID-19 pandemic			
32nd	2019	Tsegaye Getachew (ETH)	2:11:25	Mulu Seboka (ETH)	2:27:19
31st	2018	Edwin Koech (KEN)	2:09:44	Mulu Seboka (ETH)	2:28:59
30th	2017	William Ngelel (KEN)	2:13:48	Ednah Mukhwana (KEN)	2:32:58
29th	2016	Regasa Mndaye Bejiga (ETH)	2:17:48	Kibarus Mercy Jerotich (KEN)	2:40:14
28th	2015	Marius Kimutai (KEN)	2:15:18	Tsega Gelaw (ETH)	2:41:14
27th	2014	Fikre Assefa (ETH)	2:13:39	Margaret Toroitich (KEN)	2:46:05
–	2013	Did not held			
26th	2012	Julius Maisei (KEN)	2:13:03	Wei Xiaojie (CHN)	2:29:46
25th	2011	Stephen Chemlany (KEN)	2:14:15	Wang Jiali (CHN)	2:26:12
24th	2010	Stephen Chemlany (KEN)	2:13:10	Chen Rong (CHN)	2:30:09
23rd	2009	David Mutua (KEN)	2:15:09	Zhu Yingying (CHN)	2:34:00
22nd	2008	Zhang Qingle (CHN)	2:17:40	Chang Jinxue (CHN)	2:43:26
21st	2007	Zhang Wenliang (CHN)	2:19:01	Jiang Yuanyuan (CHN)	2:41:01
20th	2006	Ma Lijun (CHN)	2:21:07	Zhu Xiaolin (CHN)	2:45:57
19th	2005	Qiu Mingjun (CHN)	2:20:55	Zhu Xiaolin (CHN)	2:36:04
18th	2004	Seiji Kushibe (JPN)	2:20:15	Wei Yanan (CHN)	2:29:04
17th	2003	Gong Ke (CHN)	2:17:02	Zeng Hong (CHN)	2:40:17
16th	2002	Zhong Weifu (CHN)	2:21:23	Zhu Xiaolin (CHN)	2:42:56
15th	2001	Zhan Donglin (CHN)	2:18:58	Tian Mei (CHN)	2:39:15
14th	2000	Zhong Weifu (CHN)	2:18:52	Sun Jing (CHN)	2:40:54
13th	1999	Gong Ke (CHN)	2:20:04	Ai Dongmei (CHN)	2:34:02
12th	1998	Zhan Donglin (CHN)	2:16:15	Sun Yingjie (CHN)	2:26:22
11th	1997	Sergey Shalomeyev (RUS)	2:19:41	Dong Yanmei (CHN)	2:28:09
10th	1996	Cao Ren (CHN)	2:15:55	Yin Lili (CHN)	2:32:42
9th	1995	Ning Limin (CHN)	2:18:41	Jiang Bo (CHN)	2:32:18
8th	1994	Meng Xianhui (CHN)	2:18:20	Ren Xiujuan (CHN)	2:35:59
7th	1993	Hu Gangjun (CHN)	2:17:18	Wang Yanfang (CHN)	2:35:58
6th	1992	Ivan Shelev (RUS)	2:17:18	Wang Yanfang (CHN)	2:38:42
5th	1991	Shelgest Runov (URS)	2:14:04	Li Yemei (CHN)	2:32:46
4th	1990	Holmark Hinov (URS)	2:23:04	Tulnina (URS)	2:41:52
3rd	1989	Yasuo Yoshizumi (JPN)	2:18:55	Jiang Wei (CHN)	2:49:21
2nd	1988	Wang Hanjie (CHN)	2:26:10	Xu Guizhen (CHN)	3:13:04
1st	1987	Kaoru Shinjo (JPN)	2:20:05	Daniela Persi (ITA)	2:53:02
