= Athletics at the 2010 Asian Games – Women's marathon =

Women's marathon at the 2010 Asian Games
- Venue: Guangzhou Triathlon Venue
- Date: 27 November 2010
- Competitors: 11 from 7 nations

Medalists
gold medal	Zhou Chunxiu	China
silver medal	Zhu Xiaolin	China
bronze medal	Kim Kum-ok	North Korea

The women's marathon event at the 2010 Asian Games was held in Guangzhou Triathlon Venue, Guangzhou on 27 November.

== Schedule ==
All times are China Standard Time (UTC+08:00)

Date	Time	Event
Saturday, 27 November 2010	08:30	Final

== Records ==
Prior to this competition, the existing world, Asian and Games records were as follows.

World Record	Paula Radcliffe (GBR)	2:15:25	London, United Kingdom	13 April 2003
Asian Record	Mizuki Noguchi (JPN)	2:19:12	Berlin, Germany	25 September 2005
Games Record	Naoko Takahashi (JPN)	2:21:47	Bangkok, Thailand	6 December 1998

== Results ==
Legend

- DNF — Did not finish

Rank	Athlete	Time	Notes
1st place, gold medalist(s)	Zhou Chunxiu (CHN)	2:25:00	
2nd place, silver medalist(s)	Zhu Xiaolin (CHN)	2:26:35	
3rd place, bronze medalist(s)	Kim Kum-ok (PRK)	2:27:06	
4	Triyaningsih (INA)	2:31:49	
5	Kiyoko Shimahara (JPN)	2:32:11	
6	Lishan Dula (BRN)	2:33:56	
7	Yuri Kano (JPN)	2:36:40	
8	Jon Kyong-hui (PRK)	2:37:22	
9	Lee Sun-young (KOR)	2:39:37	
—	Juventina Napoleão (TLS)	DNF	
—	Lim Kyung-hee (KOR)	DNF	
