= 2011 Berlin Marathon =

Road running event in Berlin, Germany

38th Berlin Marathon
- 38th Berlin Marathon logo
- Venue: Berlin, Germany
- Dates: 25 September

Champions
- Men: Patrick Makau (2:03:38 WR)
- Women: Florence Kiplagat (2:19:44)

The 2011 Berlin Marathon was the 38th edition of the annual marathon event and was held on Sunday 25 September on the streets of Berlin, Germany. The men's race was won by Patrick Makau of Kenya in a world record time of 2:03:38 hours. The women's winner was Florence Kiplagat, also from Kenya, won in a time of 2:19:44 hours, which made her the ninth fastest woman of all-time. It was the first marathon she had completed in her career. In total, 32,991 runners managed to finish the 2011 edition of the marathon, comprising 25,577 men and 7414 women.

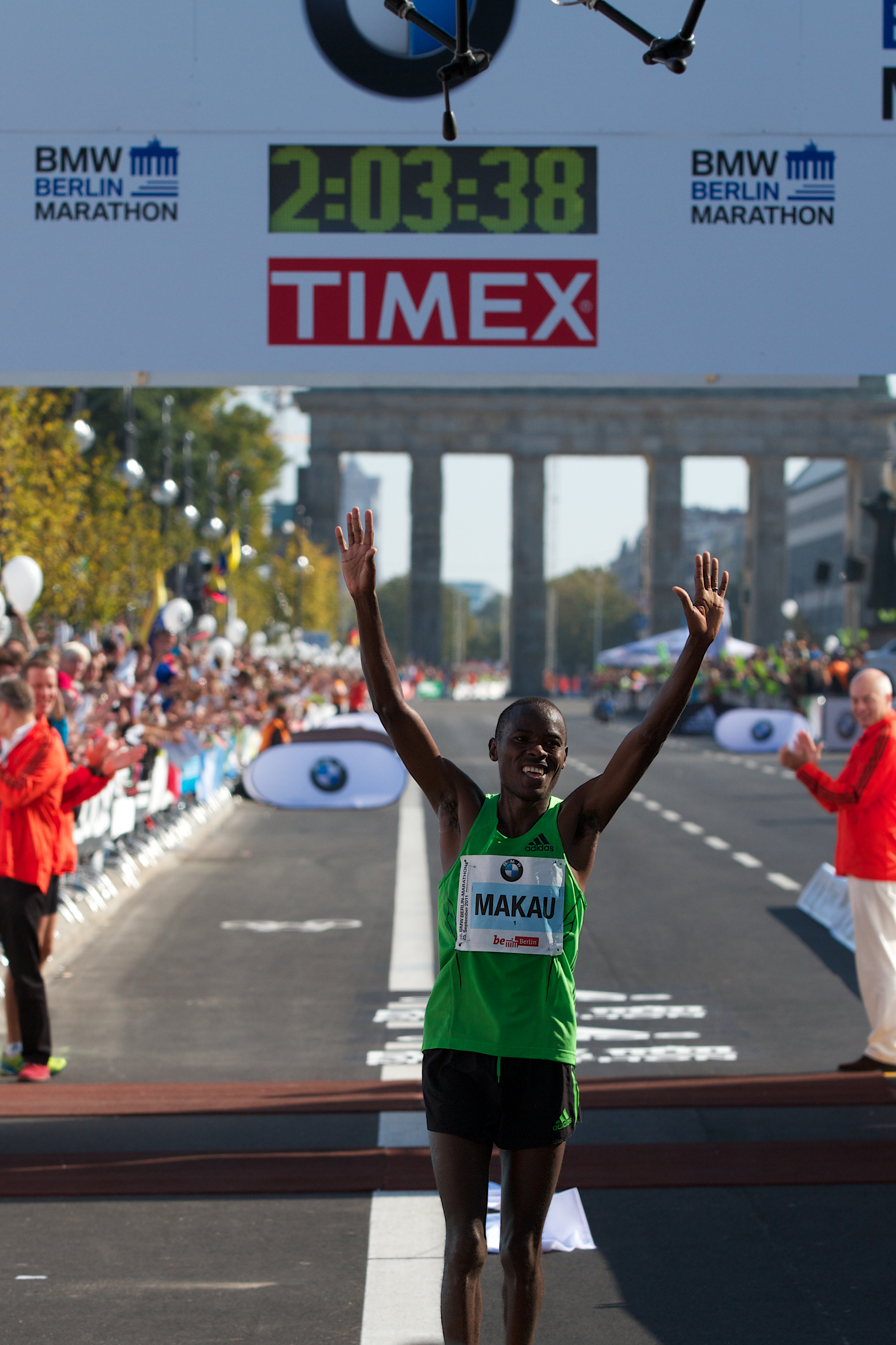
Patrick Makau crossing the line in a world record time.

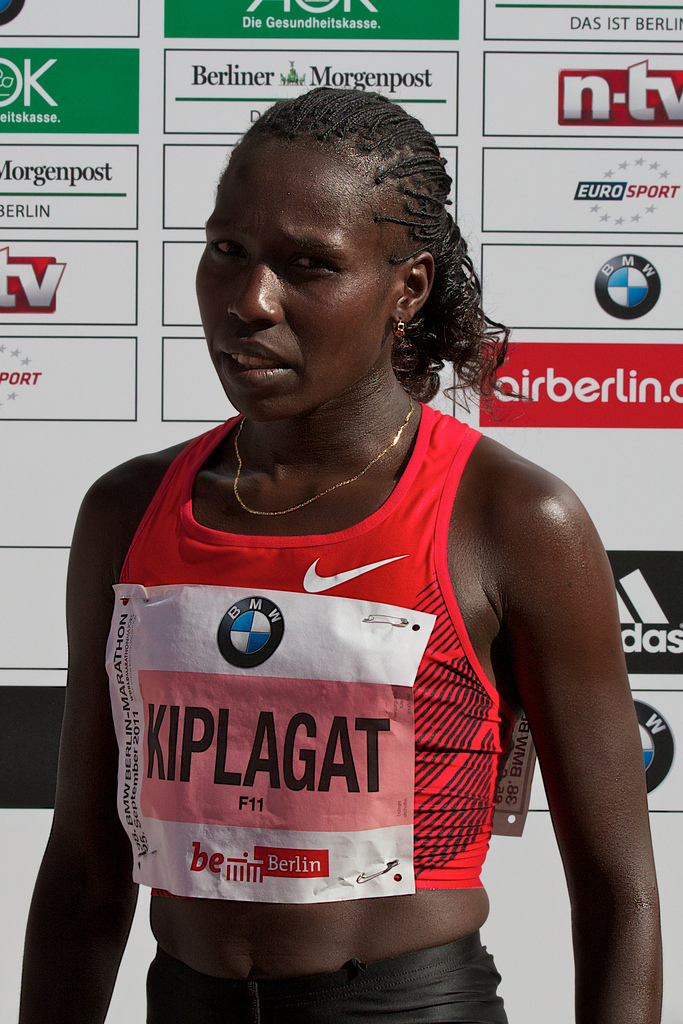
Florence Kiplagat was a surprise winner on her debut marathon race.

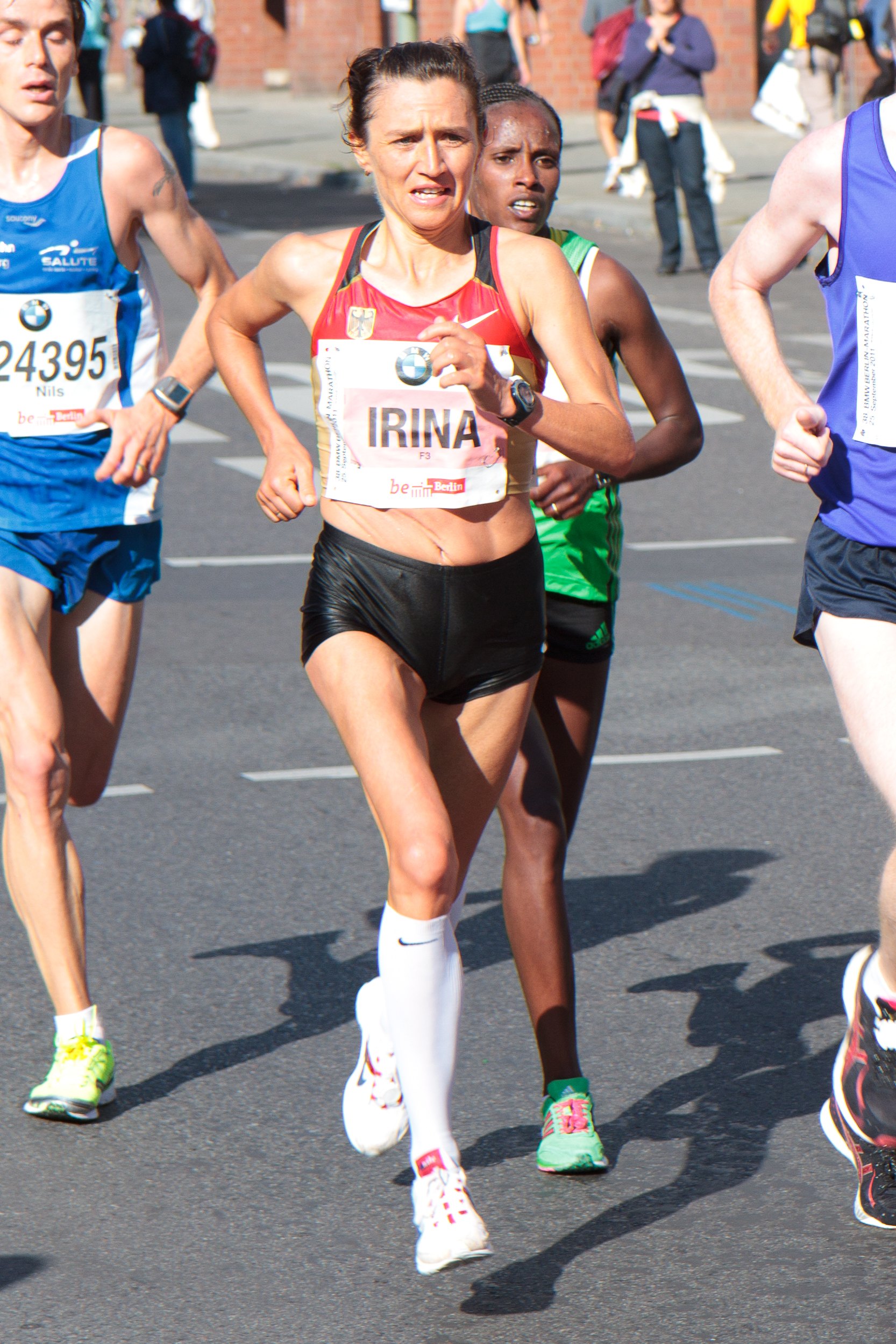
Irina Mikitenko en route to her runner-up finish

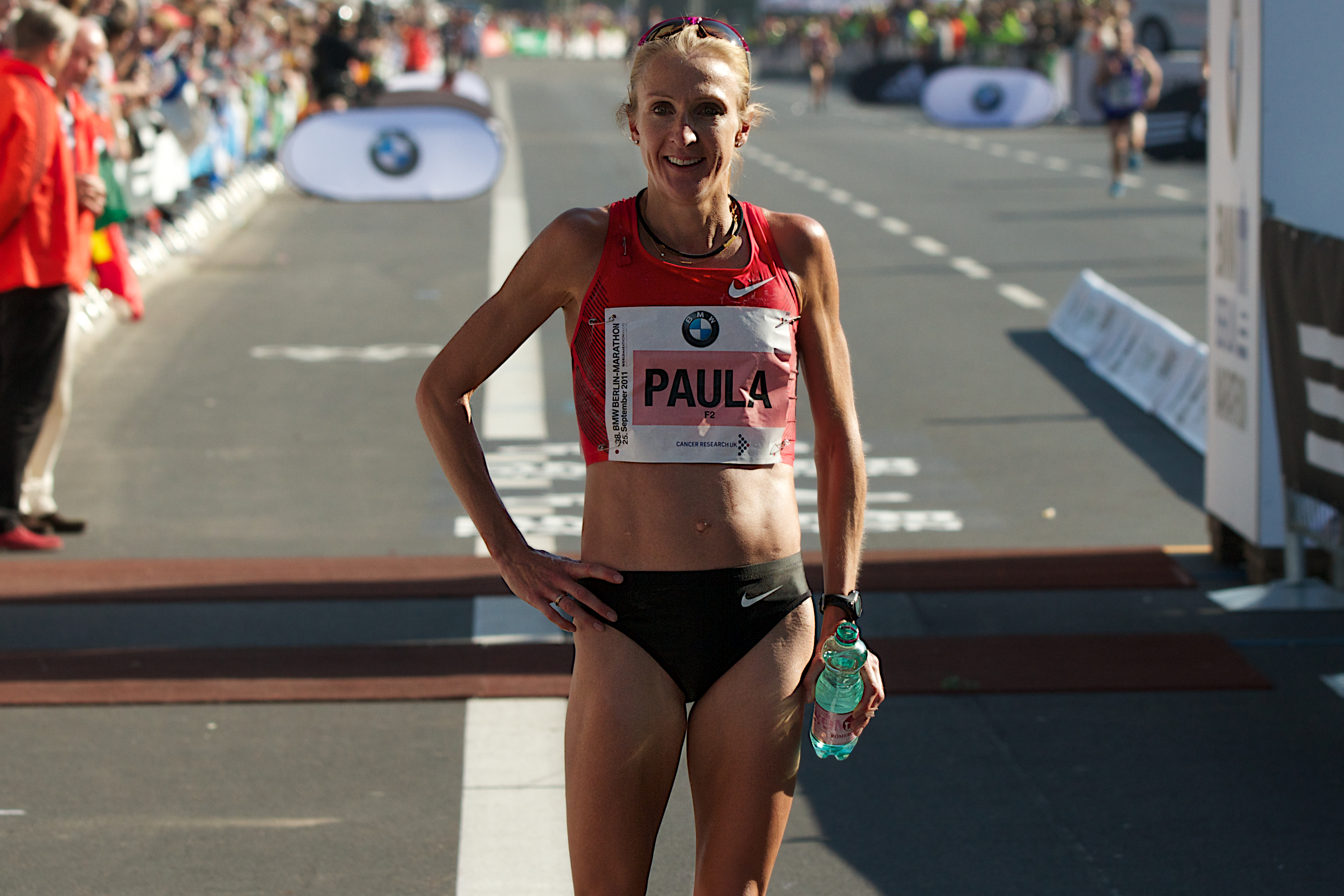
Paula Radcliffe at the finish, having completed her first marathon in two years.

Prior to the race, the two favourites for the men's competition were Makau (the defending champion and then-fifth fastest ever) and the world record holder Haile Gebrselassie of Ethiopia – the race marked the first outing since Haile had declared retirement following a poor showing at the 2010 New York City Marathon. There were a large group of pacemakers aiding the elite men for the first part of the race. The leading group, including the two favourites and three others (Edwin Kimaiyo, John Kyui and Emmanuel Samal), reached the halfway point in 61:44 minutes. Makau became the first runner to break away at the 26 km mark and he began zig-zagging along the course in the hope of disrupting Haile Gebrselassie, who followed. The tactic worked as the Ethiopian came to an abrupt halt, later dropping out entirely. Makau sped away unopposed and finished the race with a world record, beating his rival's former mark by 21 seconds. Behind him, Stephen Kwelio Chemlany, who started as a pacemaker, continued to the finish to take second place with a time of 2:07.55 hours and Kimaiyo was third to cross the line in 2:09:50 hours, making it a Kenyan podium sweep.

The two headline athletes for the women's race were Germany's Irina Mikitenko, the 2008 champion, and world record holder Paula Radcliffe of Great Britain. Radcliffe had not raced in a marathon for two years, due to injury and childbirth, and stated that her target was to gain the qualifying time for the 2012 London Olympics. A trio of Russians, Lidiya Grigoryeva, Tatyana Petrova and Nailiya Yulamanova were considered the other main contenders for the elite women's race. However, it was Florence Kiplagat (the 2009 World Cross Country Champion) who assumed the lead at the start of the race and set a fast pace. Only Radcliffe followed, but she fell back after 12 km as she was unable to match the Kenyan's speed. Kiplagat was never overtaken and crossed the line in a time of 2:19:44 hours, becoming the ninth fastest woman of all-time and completing her first ever marathon (she had started the 2011 Boston Marathon but dropped out). Radcliffe was in second place for much of the race, but was overtaken after 33 km by Mikitenko, who ran a more steady-paced race. The German was the eventual runner-up in 2:22:18 hours, while Radcliffe took third with a time of 2:23:46 hours.

The wheelchair races saw Swiss athletes take the top two places: Marcel Hug narrowly defeated Heinz Frei in the men's race and there was just one second between the women's winner Edith Hunkeler and runner-up Sandra Graf. Ewan Fernandez and Sabine Berg were the men's and women's winners in the in-line skating marathon.

== Results ==
=== Elite races ===
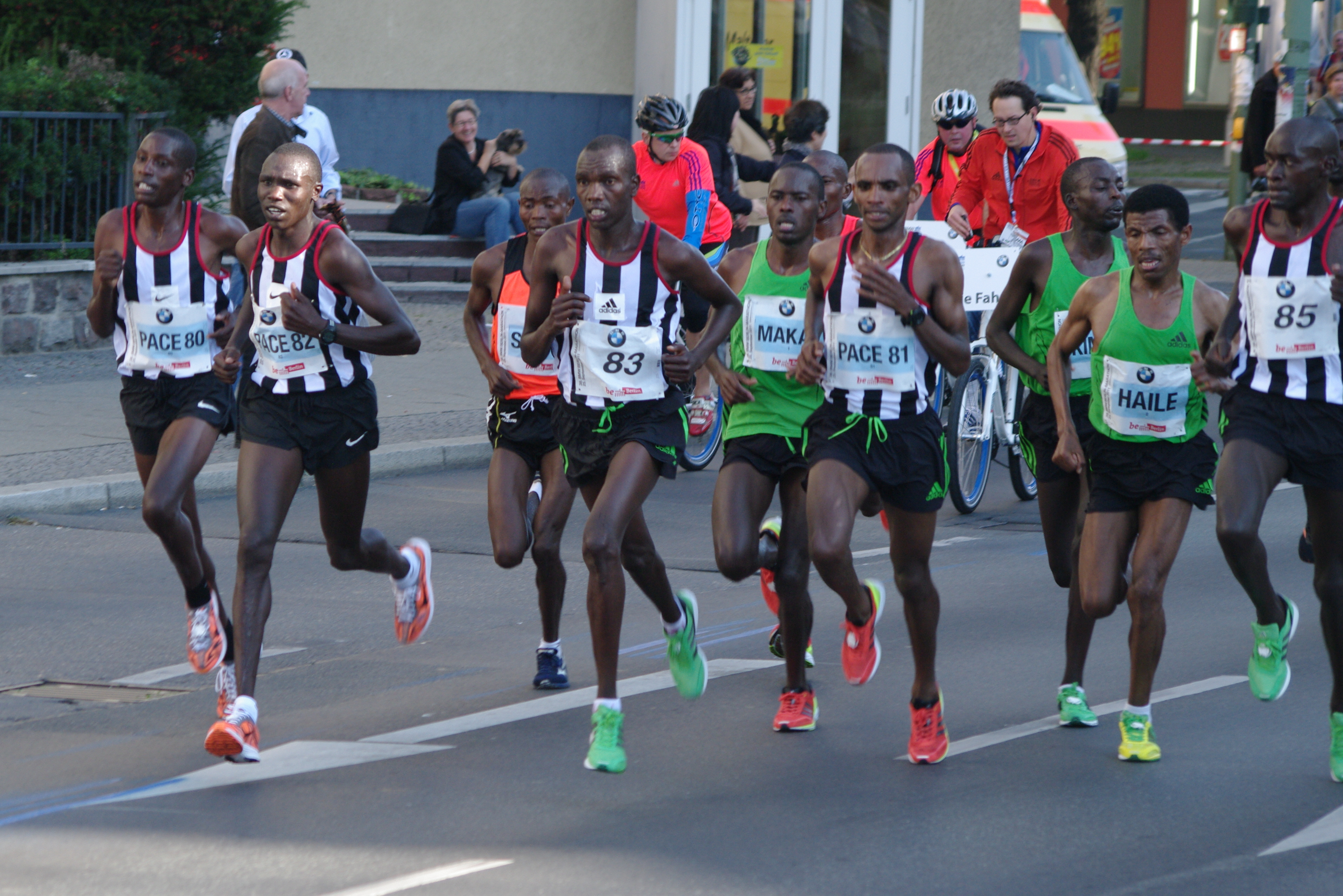
The men's leading group at 24 km, with pacemakers in black and white

Elite Men

Position	Athlete	Nationality	Time
1	Patrick Makau Musyoki	Kenya	2:03.38 WR
2	Stephen Kwelio Chemlany	Kenya	2:07.55
3	Edwin Kimaiyo	Kenya	2:09.50
4	Felix Limo	Kenya	2:10.38
5	Scott Overall	United Kingdom	2:10.55
6	Ricardo Serrano	Spain	2:13.32
7	Pedro Nimo	Spain	2:13.34
8	Simon Munyutu	France	2:14.20
9	Driss El Himer	France	2:14.46
10	Hendrick Ramaala	South Africa	2:16.00

Elite women

Position	Athlete	Nationality	Time
1	Florence Kiplagat	Kenya	2:19.44
2	Irina Mikitenko	Germany	2:22.18
3	Paula Radcliffe	United Kingdom	2:23.46
4	Atsede Habtamu	Ethiopia	2:24.25
5	Tatyana Petrova	Russia	2:25.01
6	Anna Incerti	Italy	2:25.32
7	Rosaria Console	Italy	2:26.10
8	Valeria Straneo	Italy	2:26.33
9	Eri Okubo	Japan	2:28.49
10	Miranda Boonstra	Netherlands	2:29.23

=== Wheelchair ===
Men

Position	Athlete	Nationality	Time
1	Marcel Hug	Switzerland	1:29:31
2	Heinz Frei	Switzerland	1:29:32
3	Brett McArthur	Australia	1:35:04

Women

Position	Athlete	Nationality	Time
1	Edith Hunkeler	Switzerland	1:45:20
2	Sandra Graf	Switzerland	1:45:21
3	Francesca Porcellato	Italy	1:46:47

=== In-line skating ===
Men

Position	Athlete	Nationality	Time
1	Ewan Fernandez	France	1:01:26
2	Roger Schneider	Switzerland	1:02:38
3	Julien Levrard	France	1:02:43

Women

Position	Athlete	Nationality	Time
1	Sabine Berg	Germany	1:14:56
2	Giovanna Turchirelli	Italy	1:14:56
3	Tina Strüver	Germany	1:14:56
