= Bai Xue =

Chinese long-distance runner

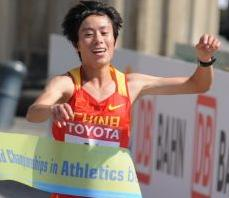
- Bai at the 2009 World Championships

Personal information
- Born: 15 December 1988 (age 37) Yi'an County, Qiqihar, Heilongjiang, China
Medal record
Women's athletics
Representing China
World Championships
Gold medal – first place	2009 Berlin	Marathon
Asian Championships
Gold medal – first place	2005 Incheon	5000 m
Gold medal – first place	2005 Incheon	10,000 m

Bai Xue (Chinese: 白雪; name means White Snow; born 15 December 1988) is a female Chinese long-distance runner who specializes in the 10,000 metres.

== Career ==
Bai won both the 5000 and the 10,000 metres at the 2005 Asian Championships, and she finished fourth in the 5,000 m at the 2006 World Junior Championships. She finished twenty-first in the 10,000 metres at the Olympic Games. She won the Beijing Marathon in 2008.

== 2009 World Championships ==
The Berlin 2009 Marathon event was Bai's first time taking part in World Championships and only second time taking part in an international marathon. She won the 2009 World Championships Women's Marathon gold medal, becoming the youngest ever women's world marathon champion at the age of 20. Bai pulled away from Japan's Yoshimi Ozaki in the last kilometer to finish the 42.195 km race in two hours 25 minutes and 15 seconds.

Bai Xue became the first Chinese athlete to win a marathon race at the World Championships. It was also the first gold medal for China in the event in Berlin, taking its medal tally to 1–1–2. And it was also the first gold in 10 years for Chinese women athletes' at the world championships. Liu Hongyu won the last gold medal in the women's 10 km walk in Seville in 1999. She is also the second Chinese to win a major international marathon after Zhou Chunxiu, who took the London Marathon title in 2007. She returned to China after the championships and defended her title at the Beijing Marathon, beating young national opposition in Zhang Xin and Zhu Xiaoling.

She continued her good form at the 11th Chinese National Games a few weeks later, setting a 10,000 m personal best on the way to winning the gold medal. At the 2010 London Marathon, she was in contention for much of the race but fell away at the 30 km point, ending up in seventh place with a run of 2:25:18.

== Personal bests ==
Her personal best times are:

- 1500 metres⁣ – 4:24.51 min (2004)
- 3000 metres⁣ – 9:16.32 min (2004)
- 5000 metres⁣ – 15:09.84 min (2007)
- 10,000 metres⁣ – 31:17.62 min (2009)
- Marathon⁣ – 2:23:27 hrs (2008)
