= James Moiben =

Kenyan long-distance runner

James Moiben (born 20 April 1977) is a male long-distance runner from Kenya. He set his personal best (2:10:07) in the men's marathon at the 1999 Paris Marathon.

== Achievements ==
Year	Competition	Venue	Position	Event	Notes
Representing Kenya
1999	Paris Marathon	Paris, France	7th	Marathon	2:10:07
2000	Berlin Marathon	Berlin, Germany	7th	Marathon	2:12:31
2001	Rotterdam Marathon	Rotterdam, Netherlands	11th	Marathon	2:10:44
2002	Frankfurt Marathon	Frankfurt, Germany	3rd	Marathon	2:12:56
2004	Xiamen International Marathon	Xiamen, China	1st	Marathon	2:10:54
2004	Beijing Marathon	Beijing, China	1st	Marathon	2:10:42
2005	Xiamen International Marathon	Xiamen, China	22nd	Marathon	2:19:18
2005	Beijing Marathon	Beijing, PR China	2nd	Marathon	2:12:15
2006	Madrid Marathon	Madrid, Spain	3rd	Marathon	2:12:30
2006	Beijing Marathon	Beijing, China	6th	Marathon	2:14:07
2007	Madrid Marathon	Madrid, Spain	4th	Marathon	2:16:42
2009	Madrid Marathon	Madrid, Spain	5th	Marathon	2:20:48
