= Gashaw Asfaw =

Ethiopian long-distance runner

Gashaw Asfaw Melese
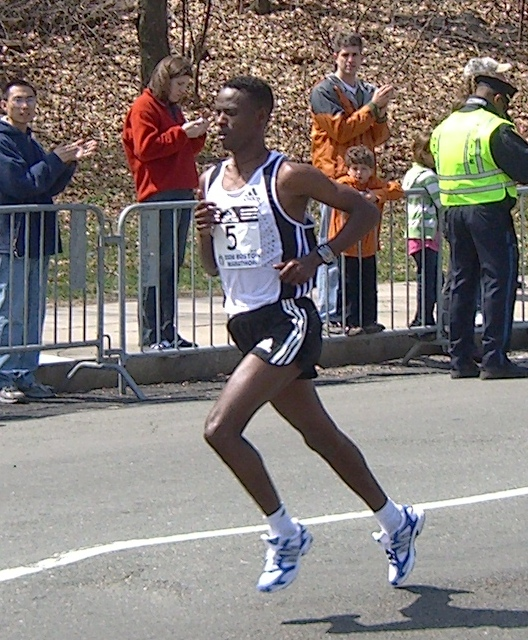

Personal information
- Nationality: Ethiopian
- Born: 26 September 1978 (age 48)

Sport
- Sport: Long-distance running

Gashaw Asfaw Melese (Amharic: ጋሻው አስፋው; born 26 September 1978) is an Ethiopian long-distance runner.

Ashaw won the silver medal at the 2003 All-Africa Games and finished fourteenth in the marathon at the 2007 World Championships. He has also participated in the 2005 edition, but did not finish the race.

His personal best marathon time is 2:08:03 hours, achieved in April 2006 in the Paris Marathon. In the half marathon his personal best time is 1:02:35 hours, achieved in September 2006 in Lille.

== Achievements ==
Year	Competition	Venue	Position	Event	Notes
Representing Ethiopia
2002	Venice Marathon	Venice, Italy	8th	Marathon	2:15:17
2003	Dubai Marathon	Dubai, United Arab Emirates	2nd	Marathon	2:10:40
2003	Rome Marathon	Rome, Italy	9th	Marathon	2:13:52
2003	All-Africa Games	Abuja, Nigeria	2nd	Marathon	2:26:08
2004	Dubai Marathon	Dubai, United Arab Emirates	1st	Marathon	2:12:49
2004	Paris Marathon	Paris, France	4th	Marathon	2:10:36
2004	Berlin Marathon	Berlin, Germany	8th	Marathon	2:09:47
2005	Mumbai Marathon	Mumbai, India	3rd	Marathon	2:13:59
2005	Paris Marathon	Paris, France	3rd	Marathon	2:09:24
2005	JTBC Seoul Marathon	Seoul, South Korea	2nd	Marathon	2:09:31
2006	Mumbai Marathon	Mumbai, India	5th	Marathon	2:14:19
2006	Paris Marathon	Paris, France	1st	Marathon	2:08:03
2007	Mumbai Marathon	Mumbai, India	2nd	Marathon	2:12:32
2007	Paris Marathon	Paris, France	2nd	Marathon	2:09:53
2007	World Championships	Osaka, Japan	14th	Marathon	2:20:58
2008	Dubai Marathon	Dubai, United Arab Emirates	9th	Marathon	2:12:03
2008	Boston Marathon	Boston, United States	4th	Marathon	2:10:47
2008	Olympic Games	Beijing, China	7th	Marathon	2:10:52
2008	Shanghai International Marathon	Shanghai, China	1st	Marathon	2:09:28
2009	Dubai Marathon	Dubai, United Arab Emirates	4th	Marathon	2:10:59
2009	Boston Marathon	Boston, United States	6th	Marathon	2:10:44
2009	Toronto Waterfront Marathon	Toronto, Canada	3rd	Marathon	2:09:23
2009	Shanghai International Marathon	Shanghai, China	1st	Marathon	2:10:10
2010	Boston Marathon	Boston, United States	6th	Marathon	2:10:53
2010	Toronto Waterfront Marathon	Toronto, Canada	5th	Marathon	2:08:55
2010	Shanghai International Marathon	Shanghai, China	1st	Marathon	2:11:36
2011	Daegu Marathon	Daegu, South Korea	8th	Marathon	2:11:34
2011	Košice Peace Marathon	Košice, Slovakia	5th	Marathon	2:15:11
2012	Rock 'n' Roll San Diego Marathon	San Diego, United States	7th	Marathon	2:12:56
2012	Rennes Le Marathon Vert	Rennes, France	2nd	Marathon	2:09:47
2013	Ottawa Marathon	Ottawa, Canada	3rd	Marathon	2:10:24
2013	Taiyuan International Marathon	Taiyuan, China	7th	Marathon	2:14:08
