= Zhou Chunxiu =

Chinese long-distance runner

- Chinese: 周春秀
Transcriptions
Standard Mandarin
- Hanyu Pinyin: Zhōu Chūnxiù
- Wade–Giles: Chou Ch'un-hsiu

Zhou Chunxiu
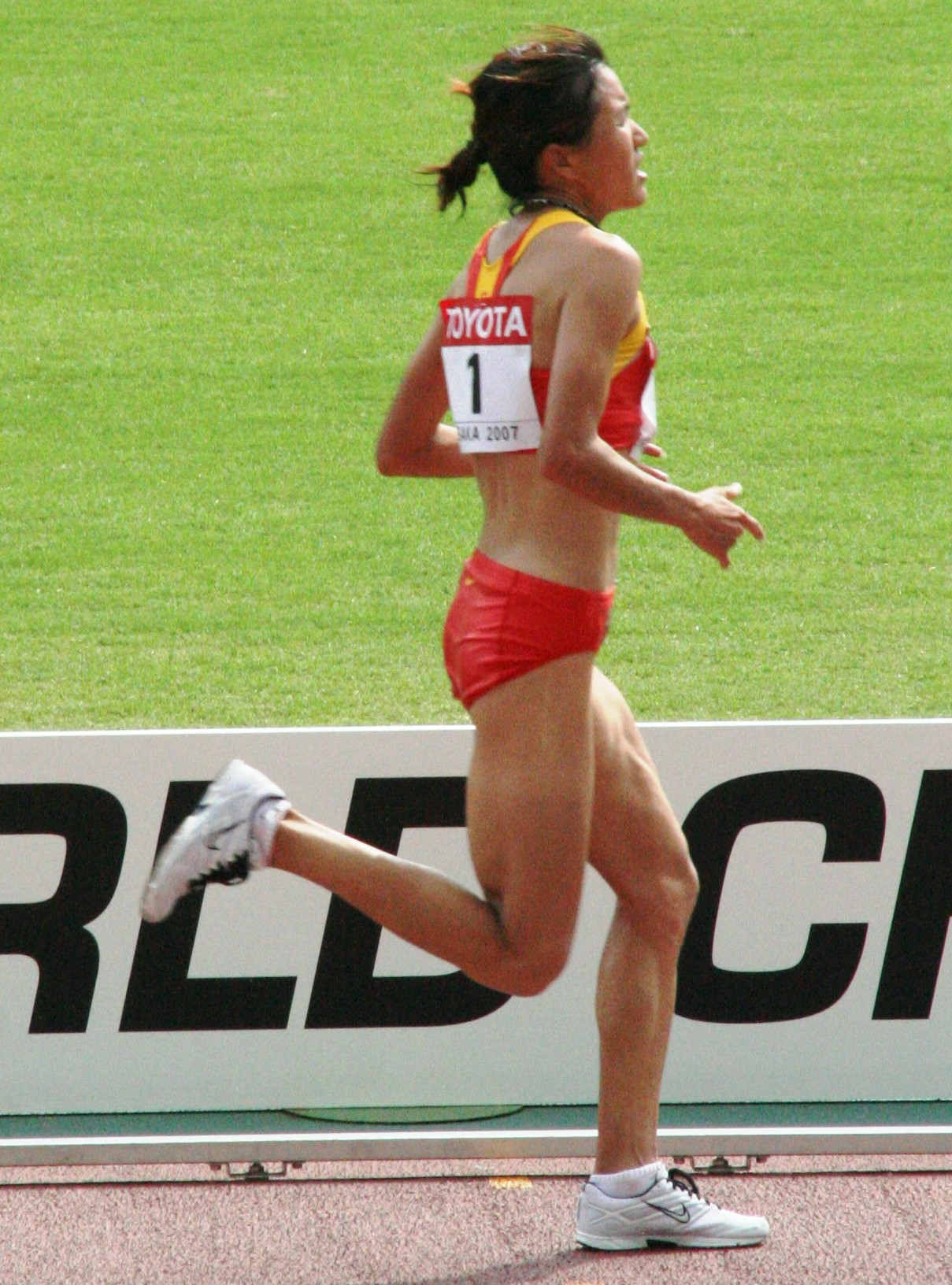
- Zhou Chunxiu at the 2007 World Championships.

Medal record

Representing China

Women's athletics

Olympic Games
Bronze medal – third place	2008 Beijing	Marathon

World Championships
Silver medal – second place	2007 Osaka	Marathon

Asian Games
Gold medal – first place	2006 Doha	Marathon
Gold medal – first place	2010 Guangzhou	Marathon

Zhou Chunxiu (Chinese: 周春秀; pinyin: Zhōu Chūnxiù; born November 15, 1978, in Sheqi County, Henan) is a Chinese marathon runner.

She competed at the 2008 Olympic Games, finishing the marathon in 3rd place. She placed fourth in the marathon at the 2005 World Championships in Helsinki. She won the marathon gold medal at the 2006 Asian Games in Doha, Qatar. She won the silver medal in the marathon at the 2007 World Championships in Osaka, and won the bronze medal in the marathon at the 2008 Summer Olympics in Beijing, one second behind the silver medalist. She finished fourth at the 2009 World Championships in Berlin.

On April 22, 2007, she won the women's race at the London Marathon for the first time in a time of 2:20:38. In 2010, Zhou took second place at the Seoul International Marathon, finishing behind Amane Gobena with a time of 2:25:01.

Her personal best for the marathon is 2:19:51 hours, a time which she achieved in March 2006 with her win at the Seoul International Marathon. The performance made her the seventh woman in history to surpass the barrier of two hours and twenty minutes in the marathon.

She set a half marathon best of 1:08:59 hours at the 2008 Yangzhou Jianzhen International Half Marathon, winning the race in course record and China all-comers record time.

== Achievements ==
Year	Competition	Venue	Position	Event	Notes
Representing China
2003	Xiamen International Marathon	Xiamen, PR China	1st	Marathon	2:34:16
2003	Beijing Marathon	Beijing, PR China	2nd	Marathon	2:23:41
2004	Xiamen International Marathon	Xiamen, PR China	1st	Marathon	2:23:28
2004	Olympic Games	Athens, Greece	33rd	Marathon	2:42:54
2004	Beijing Marathon	Beijing, PR China	2nd	Marathon	2:28:42
2005	Seoul International Marathon	Seoul, South Korea	1st	Marathon	2:23:24
2005	Xiamen International Marathon	Xiamen, PR China	1st	Marathon	2:29:58
2005	World Championships	Helsinki, Finland	5th	Marathon	2:24:12
2005	Beijing Marathon	Beijing, PR China	2nd	Marathon	2:21:11
2006	Seoul International Marathon	Seoul, South Korea	1st	Marathon	2:19:51
2006	Asian Games	Doha, Qatar	1st	Marathon	2:27:03
2007	London Marathon	London, United Kingdom	1st	Marathon	2:20:38
2007	World Championships	Osaka, Japan	2nd	Marathon	2:30:45
2008	Olympic Games	Beijing, PR China	3rd	Marathon	2:27:07
2009	London Marathon	London, United Kingdom	12th	Marathon	2:29:02
2009	World Championships	Berlin, Germany	4th	Marathon	2:25:39
2010	Asian Games	Guangzhou, China	1st	Marathon	2:25:00
2011	World Championships	Daegu, South Korea	6th	Marathon	2:29:58

== See also ==
- China at the World Championships in Athletics
