= Shanghai Marathon =

Annual race in China held since 1996

- Date: November
- Location: Shanghai, China
- Event type: Road
- Distance: Marathon
- Primary sponsor: Toray
- Established: 1996 (30 years ago)
- Course records: Men: 2:05:35 (2023) (Kenya) Philimon Kiptoo Kipchumba; Women: 2:16:36 (2025) (Kenya) Brigid Kosgei
- Website: Shanghai Marathon
- Participants: ~9,000 (marathon) (2020); ~38,000 (all races) (2019)

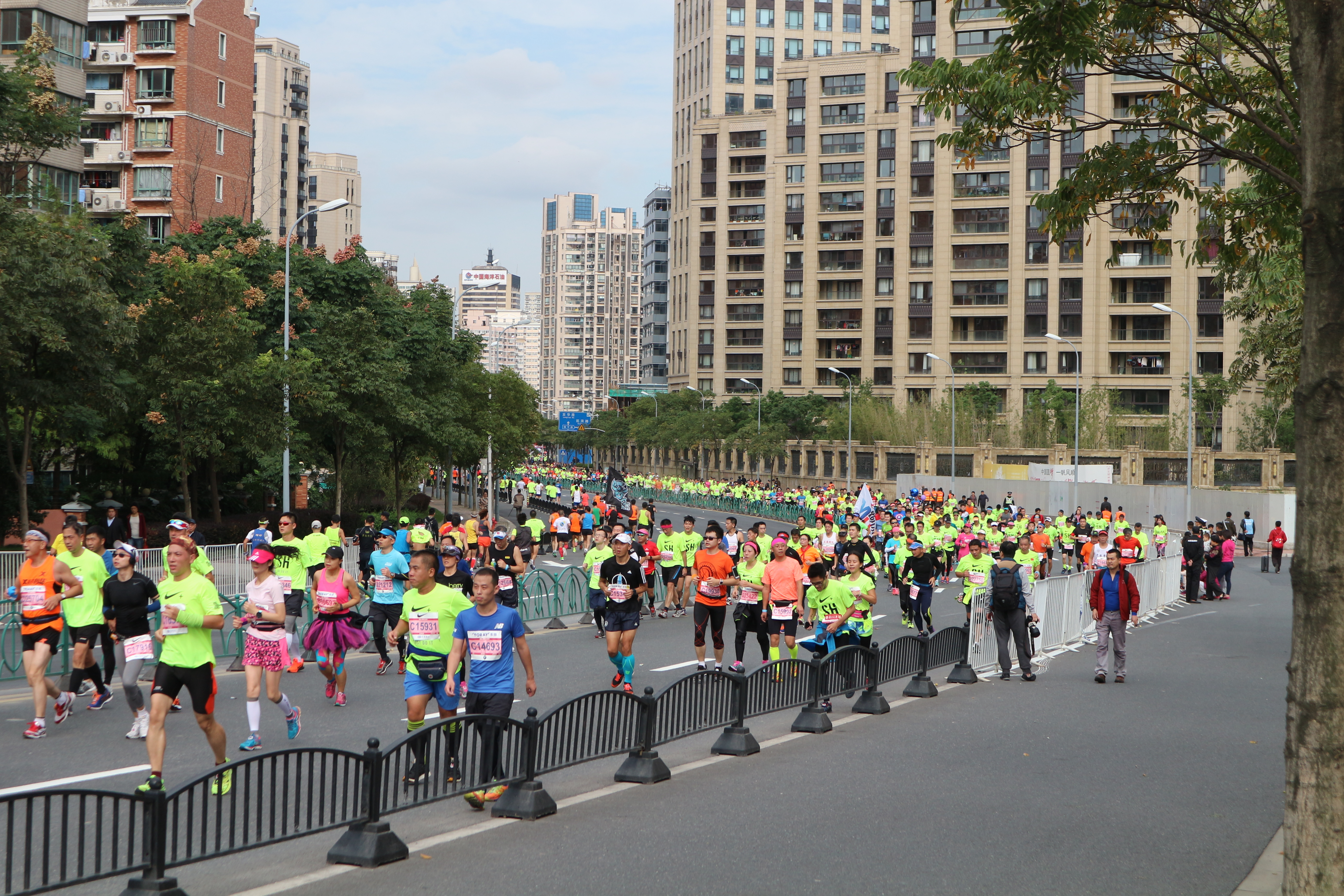
Shanghai International Marathon 2016

The Shanghai International Marathon (Chinese: 上海國際馬拉松; pinyin: Shànghǎi Guójì Mǎlāsōng is an annual marathon in late autumn hosted by Shanghai, China, since 1996. The marathon is categorized as a Platinum Label Road Race by World Athletics.

The marathon starts at the Bund Bull and finishes at Shanghai Stadium.

== History ==
The inaugural race was held in 1996 as the "Shanghai International Citizen Marathon".

For the 2020 edition of the race, due to the coronavirus pandemic, only the full marathon was run, the field was limited to 9,000 domestic runners, and the finish was moved to the West Bund Art Center.

== Course ==
External images
- Course map of all races in 2018
- Course map of full marathon in 2020

The marathon starts at the Bund Bull and finishes at Shanghai Stadium.

== Other races ==
In addition to the marathon, the event offers a 10K run and a mini marathon of 5.5 km (3.4 mi) in length. All three races begin at the Bund Bull, but the mini marathon ends at the Shanghai Exhibition Centre while the 10K ends at Fuxing Park.

== Winners ==
The men's course record was set in 2023 as Kenya's Philimon Kiptoo Kipchumba of 2:05:35 hours and Kenyan Brigid Kosgei broke the women's record in 2025 with 2:16:36 hours.

Key: Course record (in bold)

Date	Men's winner	Time	Women's winner	Time	Rf.
1996.09.28	Cao Changhai (CHN)	2:23:39	Chiaki Shigaki (JPN)	2:47:54	
1997.11.30	Lu Zhenghua (CHN)	2:19:01	Wang Benzhi (CHN)	3:03:14	
1998.11.01	Lu Zhenghua (CHN)	2:24:02	Bu Hailing (CHN)	2:49:55	
1999.11.14	Auan Caoman (NZL)	2:22:29	Fiona McKee (NZL)	2:52:07	
2000.11.12	Hailu Negussie (ETH)	2:18:17	Zhong Guoshang (CHN)	2:46:49	
2001.12.08	Zhan Donglin (CHN)	2:18:58	Zhang Shujing (CHN)	2:31:54	
2002.11.09	Katsumi Tsuchiya (JPN)	2:19:02	Zhang Shujing (CHN)	2:30:43	
2003.11.15	Jiang Chengguo (CHN)	2:22:23	Qie Liping (CHN)	2:46:45	
2004.11.13	Benson Mbithi (KEN)	2:17:55	Wei Yanan (CHN)	2:30:37	
2005.11.26	Han Gang (CHN)	2:13:22	Zhang Shujing (CHN)	2:34:25	
2006.11.26	Paul Korir (KEN)	2:15:25	Zhang Xin (CHN)	2:32:07	
2007.11.25	Samy Tum (KEN)	2:13:01	Lidia Șimon (ROM)	2:29:28	
2008.11.30	Gashaw Asfaw (ETH)	2:09:29	Irina Timofeyeva (RUS)	2:26:19	
2009.11.29	Gashaw Asfaw (ETH)	2:10:10	Wei Yanan (CHN)	2:27:49	
2010.12.05	Gashaw Asfaw (ETH)	2:11:36	Nailiya Yulamanova (RUS)	2:26:05	
2011.12.04	Willy Koitile (KEN)	2:10:21	Kebebush Haile (ETH)	2:24:08	
2012.12.02	Sylvester Teimet (KEN)	2:09:01	Feyse Tadese (ETH)	2:23:07	
2013.12.01	Stephen Mokoka (RSA)	2:09:29	Aberu Kebede (ETH)	2:23:28	
2014.11.02	Stephen Mokoka (RSA)	2:08:43	Tigist Tufa (ETH)	2:21:52	
2015.11.08	Paul Lonyangata (KEN)	2:07:14	Rael Kinyara (KEN)	2:26:23	
2016.10.30	Stephen Mokoka (RSA)	2:10:18	Roza Dereje (ETH)	2:26:18	
2017.11.12	Stephen Mokoka (RSA)	2:08:35	Roza Dereje (ETH)	2:22:43	
2018.11.18	Seyefu Tura (ETH)	2:09:18	Yebrgual Melese (ETH)	2:20:36	
2019.11.17	Paul Lonyangata (KEN)	2:08:11	Yebrgual Melese (ETH)	2:23:19	
2020.11.29	Jia'e Renjia (CHN)	2:12:44	Li Zhixuan (CHN)	2:26:39	
2022.11.27	Yang Shaohui (CHN)	2:16:04	Zhang Deshun (CHN)	2:28:17	
2023.11.26	Philimon Kiptoo Kipchumba (KEN)	**2:05:35**	Siranesh Yirga (ETH)	2:21:28	
2024.12.01	Samsom Amare (ERI)	2:06:26	Bekelech Gudeta (ETH)	2:25:21	
2025.11.30	Milkesa Mengesha (ETH)	2:06:25	Brigid Kosgei (KEN)	**2:16:36**	
