= Beijing Marathon =

Annual race in China held since 1981

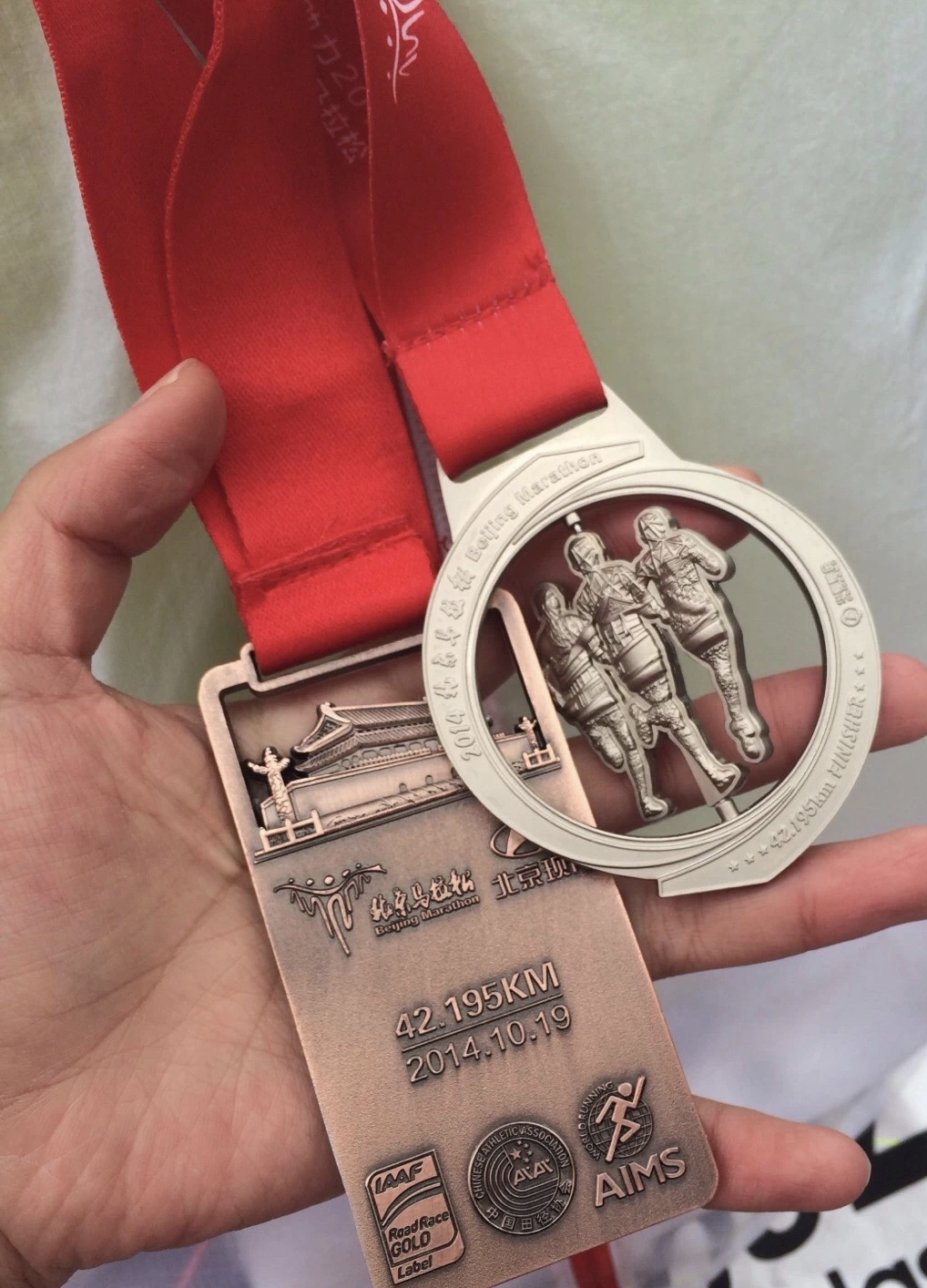
- Medal in 2014
- Date: Around October
- Location: Beijing, China
- Event type: Road
- Distance: Marathon
- Primary sponsor: CFLD
- Established: 1981 (45 years ago)
- Course records: Men's: 2:07:06 (2019) (Kenya) Mathew Kisorio; Women's: 2:19:39 (2003) (China) Sun Yingjie
- Website: Beijing Marathon
- Participants: 4,897 finishers (2009)

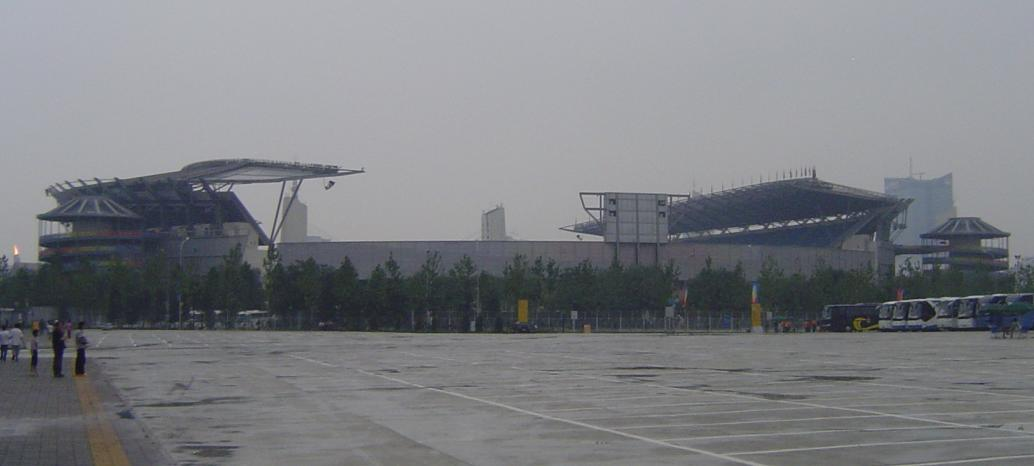
The National Olympic Sports Center has previously served as the finish

The Beijing Marathon (Chinese: 北京马拉松) is an annual marathon race held around October in Beijing, People's Republic of China, since 1981. The race begins at Tiananmen Square and finishes in Celebration Square in Olympic Green. (Note: In the past, the National Olympic Sports Center stadium has served as the finish.) The full marathon is the only distance offered.

The marathon is categorized as a Gold Label Road Race by World Athletics. (Note: It is one of twelve marathons in the People's Republic of China to hold the distinction as of 2020. (Note: The Shanghai Marathon is categorized as a Platinum Label Road Race.)) The course is certified by AIMS. (Note: This makes it eligible for world record performances.)

Beijing Marathon is the first international sport event ever to be held in China. The race is also the first marathon race to use lottery system to allocate entries and the first full marathon race only in China.

== History ==
The Beijing International Marathon has been organized by the Chinese Athletics Association annually since 1981. The creation of the race, which was international in nature from its inception, was part of a wider movement to open up China and its culture to foreign innovations – a change which was led by Deng Xiaoping, who sought to move China away from its Maoist past.

In 1997, the marathon hosted the Chinese men's national marathon championships, with the title going to race winner Hu Gangjun, who had won in Beijing two times previously.

The 2005 race served as the marathon for the 2005 National Games of China – Sun Yingjie took the Games gold medal for women while seventh placed Zhang Qingle (18 years old at the time) was the highest placing Chinese man and won the men's Games gold.

Also in 2005, the men's race winner Benson Kipchumba Cherono missed some 800 metres out of the course due to being misdirected. The race organisers accepted the blame for the mishap and, although James Moiben was the first to finish the complete course (2:12:15), Cherono was declared the official winner as he held a large leading margin before the incident.

The marathon hosted the Asian Marathon Championship races in 2006.

At the 2009 edition of the race, 4897 runners finished the marathon course, which included 556 women.

The 2014 edition of Beijing International Marathon was held on October 19 under intense smog.

The 2020 edition of the race was cancelled due to the coronavirus pandemic.

In 2021, although participation was initially restricted to permanent residents of Beijing and invited domestic elite athletes, and strict coronavirus protocols were put in place, the marathon was postponed days before the scheduled date of October 31 due to an outbreak of the Delta variant of the virus. The postponement closely followed an earlier postponement of the Wuhan Marathon days before its scheduled date.

The 2022 edition finally took place in November 6, and got around 30,000 runners, becoming first Beijing Marathon since 2019 after Covid cancelled previous races.

=== 2012 Japanese entrants ===
When the online registration of runners for the 2012 event started on November 8, 2012, it did so without the option for Japanese to do so. The events organizers said that Japanese couldn't enter this year because of "safety concerns" due to tension between Japan and China over the Senkaku Islands dispute. The Japanese embassy protested the decision.

This move attracted a large amount of criticism and on the night of November 10 the option for Japanese runners re-appeared, although there was no Japanese-language version available, which had been available the previous year.

The Chinese Athletic Association subsequently claimed that Japanese runners had never been rejected. CAA Deputy Director Shen Chunde said that in the past Japanese athletes had mainly applied through Japanese organizations so no individual registration was available.

=== Course record ===
In 1986 Taisuke Kodama of Japan set a men's course record in a time of 2:07:35. Ethiopian runner Abebe Mekonnen equaled this time in 1988 and some commentators (including the Association of Road Racing Statisticians) regard this as the true course record, in respect of reports that the 1986 course was around 400 m short of the marathon distance.

After 27 years unbeaten, Taisuke Kodama's course record was improved by Tadese Tola in 2013 as the Ethiopian beat the previous mark by nineteen seconds with 2:07:16 hours. In 2019 Mathew Kisorio improved the course record with a time of 2:07:06.

In 2003, Sun Yingjie of China set the current women's record of 2:19:38 – this run was an Asian record and the fourth fastest ever at the time, and it remains the Chinese record for the event.

== Course ==
External image
- Course map of full marathon in 2019

The marathon starts in Tiananmen Square between the Mausoleum of Mao Zedong and the National Museum of China, and finishes in Celebration Square in the Olympic Green, slightly north of the Beijing National Stadium and the Beijing National Aquatics Center.

== Winners ==
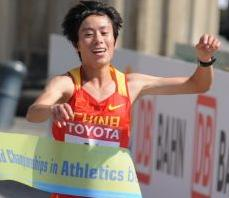
Chinese runner Bai Xue (pictured here in Berlin) has won twice in a row

Course record (in bold)
National championship race
Asian Marathon Championship race

Date	Men's winner	Time	Women's winner	Time
1981.09.27	Kjell-Erik Ståhl (SWE)	2:15:20		
1982.09.26	Li Jong-hyong (PRK)	2:14:44		
1983.09.25	Ron Tabb (USA)	2:18:51		
1984.10.14	Hideki Kita (JPN)	2:12:16		
1985.10.13	Shigeru Sō (JPN)	2:10:23		
1986.10.19	Taisuke Kodama (JPN)	2:07:35 (Note: The course is believed to have been around 400 metres short of the official 42.195 km distance.)		
1987.10.18	Juma Ikangaa (TAN)	2:12:19		
1988.10.16	Abebe Mekonnen (ETH)	2:07:35		
1989.10.15	Peter Dall (DEN)	2:12:47	Mun Gyong-ae (PRK)	2:27:16
1990.10.14	Peter Dall (DEN) -2-	2:14:55	Li Yemei (CHN)	2:32:14
1991.10.13	Negash Dube (ETH)	2:12:55	Deborah Noy (GBR)	2:35:18
1992.10.11	Takahiro Izumi (JPN)	2:11:29	Xie Lihua (CHN)	2:28:53
1993.10.17	Hu Gangjun (CHN)	2:10:57	Li Yemei (CHN) -2-	2:30:36
1994.10.30	Hu Gangjun (CHN) -2-	2:10:56	Wang Junxia (CHN)	2:31:11
1995.10.15	Meng Xianhui (CHN)	2:16:20	Ren Xiujuan (CHN)	2:30:00
1996.10.20	Nelson Ndereva (KEN)	2:10:37	Ren Xiujuan (CHN) -2-	2:27:13
1997.10.04	Hu Gangjun (CHN) -3-	2:09:18	Pan Jinhong (CHN)	2:26:39
1998.10.10	Kim Jung-won (PRK)	2:13:49	Wang Yanrong (CHN)	2:28:50
1999.10.09	Kenichi Suzuki (JPN)	2:11:33	Ai Dongmei (CHN)	2:29:20
2000.10.15	Nelson Ndereva (KEN) -2-	2:13:52	Wei Yanan (CHN)	2:26:34
2001.10.14	Gong Ke (CHN)	2:10:11	Liu Min (CHN)	2:23:37
2002.10.20	Li Zhuhong (CHN)	2:13:09	Sun Yingjie (CHN) (Note: Wei Yanan, the original winner in 2:20:23, was later disqualified for drug abuse.)	2:21:21
2003.10.19	Ian Syster (RSA)	2:07:49	Sun Yingjie (CHN) -2-	**2:19:39**
2004.10.17	James Moiben (KEN)	2:10:42	Sun Yingjie (CHN) -3-	2:24:11
2005.10.16	Benson Cherono (KEN)	2:06:55 (Note: Time invalid – finished the race 800 metres short due to misdirection.)	Sun Yingjie (CHN) -4-	2:21:01
2006.10.15	James Kwambai (KEN)	2:10:36	Sun Weiwei (CHN)	2:34:41
2007.10.21	Nephat Kinyanjui (KEN)	2:08:09	Chen Rong (CHN)	2:27:05
2008.10.19	Benjamin Kiptoo (KEN)	2:10:14	Bai Xue (CHN)	2:26:27
2009.10.18	Samuel Muturi (KEN)	2:08:20	Bai Xue (CHN) -2-	2:34:44
2010.10.24	Siraj Gena (ETH)	2:15:45	Wang Jiali (CHN)	2:29:31
2011.10.16	Francis Kiprop (KEN)	2:09:00	Wei Xiaojie (CHN)	2:28:05
2012.11.25	Tariku Jufar (ETH)	2:09:39	Jia Chaofeng (CHN)	2:27:40
2013.10.20	Tadese Tola (ETH)	2:07:16	Zhang Yingying (CHN)	2:31:19
2014.10.19	Girmay Birhanu (ETH)	2:10:42	Fatuma Sado (ETH)	2:30:03
2015.09.20	Mariko Kipchumba (KEN)	2:11:00	Betelhem Moges (ETH)	2:27:31
2016.09.17	Mekuant Ayenew (ETH)	2:11:09	Meseret Mengistu (ETH)	2:25:56
2017.09.17	Salah-Eddine Bounasr (MAR)	2:11:18	Meselech Beyene (ETH)	2:27:44
2018.09.16	Dejene Debela (ETH)	2:12:08	Valary Aiyabei (KEN)	2:21:38
2019.11.03	Mathew Kisorio (KEN)	**2:07:06**	Sutume Asefa (ETH)	2:23:31
2020	Cancelled due to COVID-19 pandemic			
2021	Cancelled due to COVID-19 pandemic			
2022.11.06	Anubek Kuwan (CHN)	2:14:34	Xia Yuyu (CHN)	2:28:57
2023.10.29	Deresa Geleta Ulfata (ETH)	2:07:41	Vibian Chepkirui (KEN)	2:21:57
2024.11.03	Lemi Berhanu Hayle (ETH)	2:09:16	Vicoty Chepngeno (KEN)	2:21:56
2025.11.02	Lemi Berhanu Hayle (ETH)	2:08:10	Anchinalu Dessie (ETH)	2:26:08
