= Zhang Yingying (runner) =

Chinese long-distance runner

Zhang Yingying (simplified Chinese: 张莹莹; traditional Chinese: 張瑩瑩; pinyin: Zhāng Yíngyíng; born January 4, 1990, in Hailar District, Inner Mongolia) is a Chinese long-distance runner. At only 18 years, she qualified for the 2008 Summer Olympics to represent China at the 5000 metres, 10,000 metres and the marathon.

Her first breakthrough race had come at the age of seventeen when she ran at the Beijing Marathon and took second place with a time of 2:27:20 hours. The following year she won the Xiamen Marathon with a world junior best time of 2:22:38 hours. She was chosen to run both the 5000 m and 10,000 m at the 2008 Beijing Olympics – she failed to make the final in the 5000 m but finished 16th in the 10,000 m. At the 2009 World Championships in Athletics she was 18th in the 10,000 m, and her career came to an abrupt stop.

She revived her running in 2013 by winning the Beijing Marathon in a time of 2:31:19 hours in her first outing since 2009.

== Career highlights ==
Marathons
2007 - Xiamen, 4th, Xiamen Marathon
2007 - Beijing, 2nd, Beijing Marathon
2008 - Xiamen, 1st, Xiamen Marathon

City Games
2007 - Wuhan, 3rd, 5000 m
2007 - Wuhan, 1st, 10,000 m

Other achievements
2007 - 31:17.30, 4th best time of the year, 10,000 m
2009 - Yangzhou, 1st, Yangzhou Jianzhen International Half Marathon

== Personal bests ==
Distance	Mark	Date	Location	Note
5000 m	15:06.08	2007	Wuhan	
10,000 m	31:17.30	2007	Wuhan	
Marathon	2:22.38	2008	Xiamen	World junior record
