= Yangzhou Jianzhen International Half Marathon =

Annual race in Yangzhou, Jiangsu, China

Coordinates: 32°23′27″N 119°21′55″E

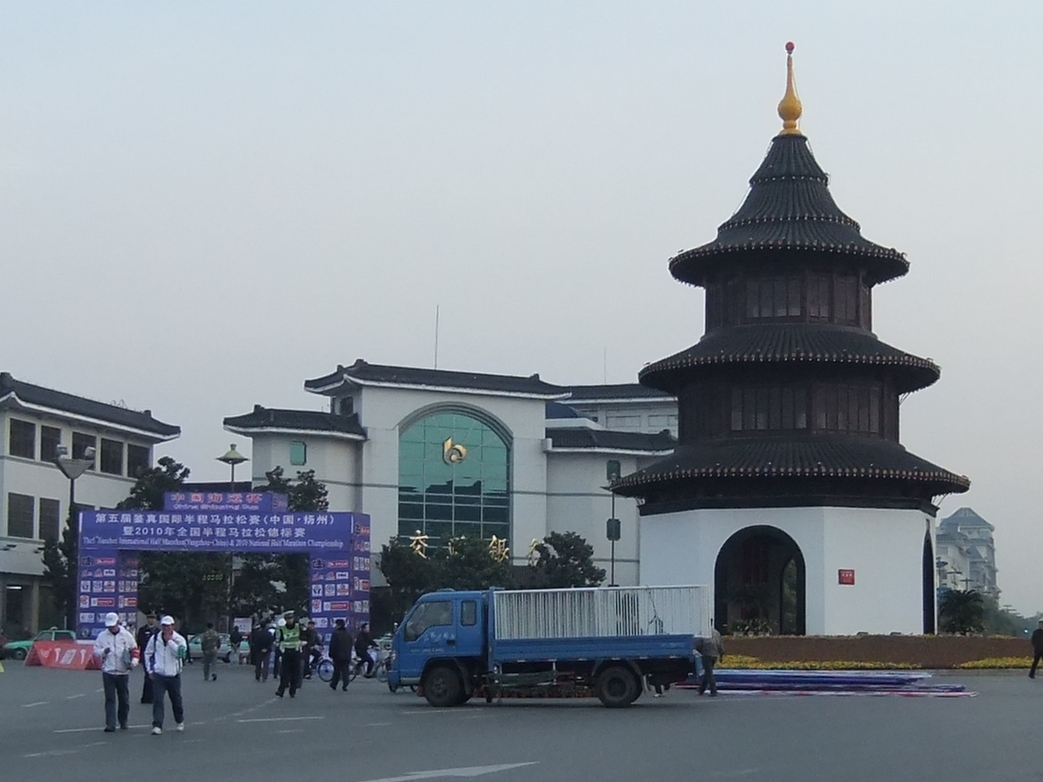
- The course passes Yangzhou's Wenchang Pavilion
- Date: April
- Location: Yangzhou, China
- Event type: road
- Distance: Half marathon
- Established: 2006
- Course records: Men's: 59:31 (2025) (Kenya) Alex Nzioka Matata; Women's: 1:07:05 (2025) (Kenya) Catherine Amanang'ole
- Website: https://www.yzmls.com

The Yangzhou Jianzhen International Half Marathon (Chinese: 扬州鉴真国际半程马拉松赛) is an annual road running competition over the half marathon distance 21.0975 kilometres (13.1094 mi) which takes place in April in Yangzhou, People's Republic of China.

The event is named in honour of Jianzhen, a Chinese monk from the city who propagated Buddhism in Japan in the 8th century. The event was first held in 2006 and grew exponentially in its first six years: it gained IAAF Silver Label Road Race status in 2010 and began to attract elite and amateur runners alike. Almost 3000 runners finished the half marathon in 2011, while the introduction of a 10K fun run that year saw 25,000 runners take part in the day's event. The race is predominantly Chinese, although 230 foreign athletes were present in 2011. East African athletes typically occupy the higher places in the elite races.

The very flat, point-to-point course is certified by the Association of International Marathons and Distance Races. The city-centre course begins and ends at the Stadium of Yangzhou Sport Center and passes many of the city's landmarks, including the Wenchang Pavilion, Daming Temple and the Yangzhou Museum.

The current men's course record is 00:59:31 by Alex Nzioka Matata in 2025. The women's course record is 1:07:05 by Catherine Amanang'ole in 2025.

== Past winners ==
Key: Course record

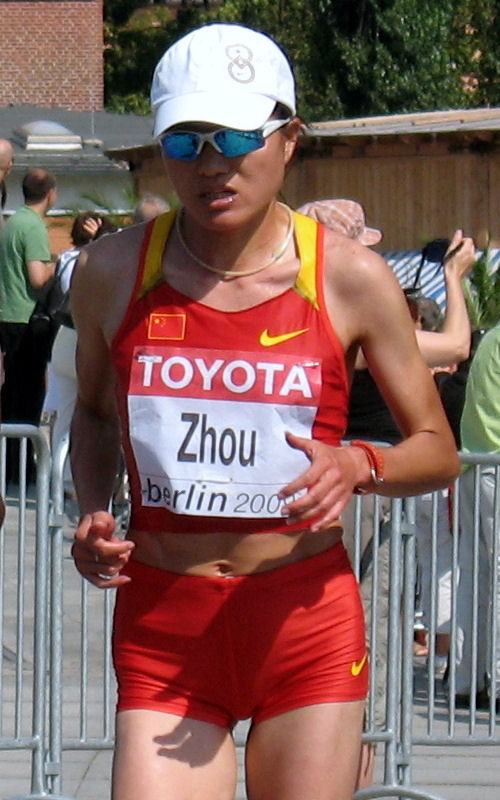
Zhou Chunxiu, the 2008 winner and a former women's course record holder.

Edition	Date	Men's winner	Time (h:m:s)	Women's winner	Time (h:m:s)
1st	27 May 2006	Li Rongtian (CHN)	1:05:53	Ruth Wanjiru (KEN)	1:13:42
2nd	28 Apr 2007	Cheng Tao (CHN)	1:03:23	Zhu Xiaolin (CHN)	1:13:25
3rd	06 Apr 2008	Zhao Ran (CHN)	1:02:57	Zhou Chunxiu (CHN)	1:08:59
4th	26 Apr 2009	John Musyoki (KEN)	1:02:00	Zhang Yingying (CHN)	1:11:01
5th	25 Apr 2010	Ahmed Baday (MAR)	1:01:48	Nina Rillstone (NZL)	1:11:18
6th	24 Apr 2011	Deriba Merga (ETH)	1:01:10	Mare Dibaba (ETH)	1:09:41
7th	29 Apr 2012	Ayele Abshero (ETH)	1:01:11	Philes Ongori (KEN)	1:11:07
8th	21 Apr 2013	Yacob Jarso (ETH)	1:00:39	Worknesh Degefa (ETH)	1:08:43
9th	20 Apr 2014	Nguse Tesfaldet (ERI)	1:00:08	Gladys Cherono (KEN)	1:08:16
10th	19 Apr 2015	Mosinet Geremew (ETH)	59:52	Flomena Cheyech (KEN)	1:08:36
11th	24 Apr 2016	Mosinet Geremew (ETH)	1:00:43	Peres Jepchirchir (KEN)	1:07:21
12th	23 Apr 2017	Mosinet Geremew (ETH)	1:00:56	Sutume Asefa (ETH)	1:10:30
13th	22 Apr 2018	Mosinet Geremew (ETH)	1:01:31	Ababel Yeshaneh (ETH)	1:09:06
14th	21 Apr 2019	Berehanu Tsegu (ETH)	59:56	Perine Nengampi (KEN)	1:08:04
15th	8 Nov 2020 (cancelled due to COVID-19 pandemic)				
16th	7 Nov 2021 (cancelled due to COVID-19 pandemic)				
17th	3 Nov 2022 (cancelled due to COVID-19 pandemic)				
18th	16 Apr 2023	Gerba Dibaba (ETH)	1:00:51	Beyenu Degefa (ETH)	1:09:54
19th	31 Mar 2024	Edward Konana Koonyo (KEN)	1:00:07	Maurine Jemutai (KEN)	1:07:19
20th	30 Mar 2025	Alex Matata (KEN)	59:31	Catherine Amanang'ole (KEN)	1:07:05

== See also ==
- Shanghai International Half Marathon
