= Xiamen Marathon =

Annual race held in Xiamen, China

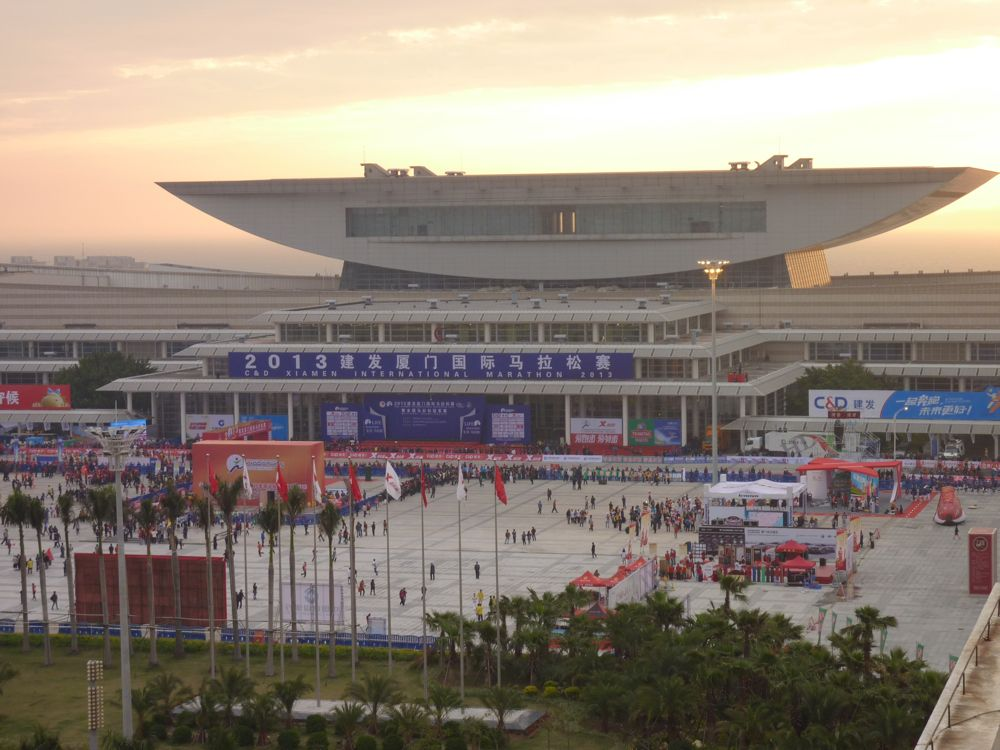
- Start & Finish: Conference & Exhibition Center
- Date: Early January
- Location: Xiamen, China
- Event type: Road
- Distance: Marathon
- Primary sponsor: Xiamen C&D
- Established: 2003
- Course records: Men: 2:06:06 (2025) (Ethiopia) Dawit Wolde; Women: 2:18:46 (2025) (Ethiopia) Ruti Aga
- Website: Xiamen International Marathon

The Xiamen Marathon (Chinese: 厦门马拉松; pinyin: Xiàmén guójì mǎlāsōng sài; Pe̍h-ōe-jī: Ē-mn̂g kok-chè má-la-song sài) is a Platinum Label marathon event held annually on the Xiamen in Fujian, People's Republic of China. Xiamen C&D Inc. is the current title sponsor for the race. More than 50,000 runners took part in the race in 2010. The 2013 edition featured 73,896 entrants.

== History ==
The Xiamen International Marathon, which began in 2003 and is deemed by the IAAF as a Gold Label Road Race, is famous for its coastal scenic course. The entire course follows the scenic sections of the coastal city. The 2010 edition of the race had at least 30 instances of cheating, with some runners carrying multiple timing sensors or using public transport mid-course. Judges believed this was due to students attempting to gain bonus points for their National Higher Education Entrance Examinations.

== Winners ==
Key: Course record

Date	Men's winner	Time (h:m:s)	Women's winner	Time (h:m:s)
11 Jan 2026	Dawit Wolde (ETH)	2:09:18	Ruti Aga (ETH)	2:22:45
5 Jan 2025	Dawit Wolde (ETH)	2:06:06	Ruti Aga (ETH)	2:18:46
7 Jan 2024	Asefa Boki (ETH)	2:06:46	Bekelech Gudeta (ETH)	2:22:54
2 Apr 2023	Philimon Kipchumba (KEN)	2:08:00	Meseret Alemu (ETH)	2:24:41
10 Apr 2021	Yang Dinghong (CHN)	2:15:25	Jiao Anjing (CHN)	2:35:30
5 Jan 2020	Birhan Nebebew (ETH)	2:08:16	Medina Armino (ETH)	2:26:12
6 Jan 2019	Dejene Debela (ETH)	2:09:26	Medina Armino (ETH)	2:27:25
7 Jan 2018	Dejene Debela (ETH)	2:11:22	Fatuma Sado (ETH)	2:26:41
2 Jan 2017	Lemi Berhanu (ETH)	2:08:27	Meseret Mengistu (ETH)	2:25:58
2 Jan 2016	Vincent Kipruto (KEN)	2:10:18	Worknesh Edesa (ETH)	2:24:04
3 Jan 2015	Moses Mosop (KEN)	2:06:19	Mare Dibaba (ETH)	2:19:52
2 Jan 2014	Mariko Kipchumba (KEN)	2:08:03	Mare Dibaba (ETH)	2:21:37
5 Jan 2013	Negari Terfa (ETH)	2:07:32	Fatuma Sado (ETH)	2:27:35
7 Jan 2012	Peter Kamais (KEN)	2:07:37	Ashu Kasim (ETH)	2:23:09
2 Jan 2011	Robert Kipchumba (KEN)	2:08:00	Amane Gobena (ETH)	2:31:49
2 Jan 2010	Feyisa Lilesa (ETH)	2:08:47	Atsede Baysa (ETH)	2:28:53
3 Jan 2009	Samuel Mugo (KEN)	2:08:51	Chen Rong (CHN)	2:29:52
5 Jan 2008	Kiprotich Kenei (KEN)	2:09:49	Zhang Yingying (CHN)	2:22:38
31 Mar 2007	Li Zhuhong (CHN)	2:13:17	Zhu Xiaolin (CHN)	2:26:08
25 Mar 2006	Stephen Kamar (KEN)	2:10:46	Sun Weiwei (CHN)	2:26:32
26 Mar 2005	Raymond Kipkoech (KEN)	2:09:49	Zhou Chunxiu (CHN)	2:29:58
27 Mar 2004	James Moiben (KEN)	2:10:54	Zhou Chunxiu (CHN)	2:23:28
30 Mar 2003	Hailu Negussie (ETH)	2:09:03	Zhou Chunxiu (CHN)	2:34:16

=== Multiple wins ===
Men's
Athlete	Wins	Years
Dejene Debela (ETH)	2	2018, 2019
Dawit Wolde (ETH)	2	2025, 2026

Women's
Athlete	Wins	Years
Zhou Chunxiu (CHN)	3	2003, 2004, 2005
Mare Dibaba (ETH)	2	2014, 2015
Fatuma Sado (ETH)	2	2013, 2018
Medina Armino (ETH)	2	2019, 2020
Ruti Aga (ETH)	2	2025, 2026

=== By country ===
Country	Total	Men's	Women's
Ethiopia	25	10	15
Kenya	11	11	0
China	10	2	8
