= List of Indian National Open Athletics Championships winners =

The Indian National Open Athletics Championships is an annual outdoor track and field competition, organised by the Athletics Federation of India, which serves as the national championship for the sport in India. It was first held as a national championship in 1961. The 1994 championship was an international event, as foreign athletes were invited to participate as part of the opening of the Jawaharlal Nehru Stadium.

== Men ==
=== 100 metres ===
- 1988: Canute Meghalaes
- 1989: Anand Shetty
- 1990: Selvaraj Roberts
- 1991: Selvaraj Roberts
- 1992: Selvaraj Roberts
- 1993: M. S. Sridharan
- 1994: Salaam Gariba (GHA)
- 1995: ?
- 1996: Amit Khanna
- 1997: ?
- 1998: Amit Khanna
- 1999: Anil Kumar Prakash
- 2000: Sachin Navale
- 2001: Anil Kumar Prakash
- 2002: Sanjay Ghosh
- 2003: Vilas Nilgund
- 2004: Piyush Kumar
- 2005: Anil Kumar Prakash

=== 200 metres ===
- 1988: Anand Shetty
- 1989: Arjun Devaiah
- 1990: Arjun Devaiah
- 1991: Selvaraj Roberts
- 1992: Anand Natarajan
- 1993: Anand Natarajan
- 1994: Salaam Gariba (GHA)
- 1995: Jasmer Malik
- 1996: Amit Khanna
- 1997: Jasmer Malik
- 1998: Ajay Raj Singh
- 1999: Anil Kumar Prakash
- 2000: Clifford Joshua
- 2001: Anil Kumar Prakash
- 2002: Anand Menezes
- 2003: Piyush Kumar
- 2004: Anil Kumar Prakash
- 2005: Alaguvel Arvind

=== 400 metres ===
- 1988: Vijaya Kumaran
- 1989: Arjun Devaiah
- 1990: Chellappan Muralidharan
- 1991: B. Salju
- 1992: Jata Shankar
- 1993: Avtar Singh
- 1994: Sunday Bada (NGR)
- 1995: ?
- 1996: Dinesh Rawat
- 1997: ?
- 1998: Paramjit Singh
- 1999: K. J. Manoj Lal
- 2000: Anil Kumar Rohil
- 2001: K. J. Manoj Lal
- 2002: K. J. Manoj Lal
- 2003: K. J. Manoj Lal
- 2004: Sarish Paul
- 2005: P. S. Sreejith

=== 800 metres ===
- 1988: Budhwa Oraon
- 1989: Sukhcharan Singh
- 1990: Avtar Singh
- 1991: Vijaya Kumaran
- 1992: Avtar Singh
- 1993: Avtar Singh
- 1994: Vincent Malakwen (KEN)
- 1995: ?
- 1996: Anil Kumar Minz
- 1997: ?
- 1998: K. J. Manoj Lal
- 1999: K. J. Manoj Lal
- 2000: P. Jai Kumar
- 2001: K. M. Binu
- 2002: K. M. Binu
- 2003: P. S. Primesh Kumar
- 2004: Josemon Mathew
- 2005: Ghamanda Ram

=== 1500 metres ===
- 1988: P. Sholamuthu
- 1989: Bahadur Prasad
- 1990: Bahadur Prasad
- 1991: Ram Niwas
- 1992: Bahadur Prasad
- 1993: Bahadur Prasad
- 1994: Vénuste Niyongabo (BDI)
- 1995: ?
- 1996: Virender Singh
- 1997: ?
- 1998: Bahadur Prasad
- 1999: Gulab Chand
- 2000: Kuldeep Kumar
- 2001: T. M. Sanjeev
- 2002: Kuldeep Kumar
- 2003: Gulab Chand
- 2004: C. Hamza
- 2005: Pritam Bind
- 2019: Ajay Kumar Saroj
- 2021: Parvej Khan
- 2022 : Parvej Khan

=== 5000 metres ===
- 1988: K. M. Suresh
- 1989: Bahadur Prasad
- 1990: Vijay Kumar
- 1991: Madan Singh
- 1992: Leela Ram
- 1993: Bahadur Prasad
- 1994: Ibrahim Kinuthia (KEN)
- 1995: ?
- 1996: Gulab Chand
- 1997: ?
- 1998: Gulab Chand
- 1999: N. Gojen Singh
- 2000: Gulab Chand
- 2001: Krishnan Shankar
- 2002: Shiva Nanda
- 2003: Gulab Chand
- 2004: Jagannath Lakade
- 2005: Jagannath Lakade

=== 10,000 metres ===
- 1988: E. Rajendra
- 1989: Bahadur Prasad
- 1990: Danvir Singh
- 1991: Madan Singh
- 1992: Madan Singh
- 1993: Narinder Singh
- 1994: Bahadur Prasad
- 1995: ?
- 1996: Gulab Chand
- 1997: ?
- 1998: Krishnan Shankar
- 1999: N. Gojen Singh
- 2000: Harish Tiwari
- 2001: Krishnan Shankar
- 2002: Aman Saini
- 2003: I. Shivananda
- 2004: Jagannath Lakade
- 2005: Jagannath Lakade

=== Marathon ===
- 2005: H. A. Chinnappa

=== 3000 metres steeplechase ===
- 1988: P. Sholamuthu
- 1989: Deena Ram
- 1990: Deena Ram
- 1991: Deena Ram
- 1992: Deena Ram
- 1993: Balkar Singh
- 1994: Mark Rowland (GBR)
- 1995: ?
- 1996: Narinder Singh
- 1997: ?
- 1998: Arun D'Souza
- 1999: Amrish Kumar
- 2000: Arun D'Souza
- 2001: Arun D'Souza
- 2002: Arun D'Souza
- 2003: Arun D'Souza
- 2004: Arun D'Souza
- 2005: Arun D'Souza

=== 110 metres hurdles ===
- 1988: Vijay Kumar
- 1989: Ashish Mondal
- 1990: Ashish Mondal
- 1991: Ashish Mondal
- 1992: Benny John
- 1993: Dharmendra Singh
- 1994: Li Tong (CHN)
- 1995: ?
- 1996: Dharminder Kumar Sharma
- 1997: ?
- 1998: P. T. Yesudoss
- 1999: P. T. Yesudoss
- 2000: Gurpreet Singh
- 2001: Gurpreet Singh
- 2002: P. T. Yesudoss
- 2003: Gurpreet Singh
- 2004: K. Krishna Mohan
- 2005: Naunidh Singh

=== 400 metres hurdles ===
- 1988: Surinder Singh
- 1989: C. Haridas
- 1990: Bhuvan Singh
- 1991: Bhuvan Singh
- 1992: Bhuvan Singh
- 1993: Rajender Singh
- 1994: Rajiv Gupta
- 1995: ?
- 1996: Sahib Singh
- 1997: ?
- 1998: Sahib Singh
- 1999: Mandeep Singh
- 2000: K. P. Vishakamani
- 2001: Gurpreet Singh
- 2002: Shebin Joseph
- 2003: Vara Prasad Reddy
- 2004: Patlavath Shankar
- 2005: Joseph Abraham

=== High jump ===
- 1988: Nalluswamy Annavi
- 1989: Nalluswamy Annavi
- 1990: Nalluswamy Annavi
- 1991: Nalluswamy Annavi
- 1992: Nalluswamy Annavi
- 1993: Chander Pal Ratni
- 1994: Chander Pal Ratni
- 1995: ?
- 1996: Sunil Kumar Azad
- 1997: ?
- 1998: S. Arumugam Pillai
- 1999: Juby Thomas
- 2000: Kakkad Razack Roshan
- 2001: Maria Lorans
- 2002: Mahesh Kumar
- 2003: Hari Shankar Roy
- 2004: Benedict Starli
- 2005: Hari Shankar Roy

=== Pole vault ===
- 1988: Vijay Pal Singh
- 1989: Vijay Pal Singh
- 1990: M. A. Eldo
- 1991: Vijay Pal Singh
- 1992: M. A. Eldo
- 1993: M. A. Eldo
- 1994: M. A. Eldo
- 1995: MUKESH SINGH
- 1996: Sat Pal Saini
- 1997: M. A. Eldo
- 1998: Ramdhari Singh
- 1999: Jitendra Kumar Singh
- 2000: Shyam Sekhar Singh
- 2001: Ramdhari Singh
- 2002: V. V. Geesh Kumar
- 2003: Jitendra Kumar Singh
- 2004: Gajanan Upadhyay
- 2005: V. V. Geesh Kumar

=== Long jump ===
- 1988: Shyam Kumar Sunder
- 1989: Praveen Fernandez
- 1990: Shyam Kumar Sunder
- 1991: Shyam Kumar Sunder
- 1992: Shyam Kumar Sunder
- 1993: Shyam Kumar Sunder
- 1994: Shyam Kumar Sunder
- 1995: ?
- 1996: Amit Kumar Saha
- 1997: ?
- 1998: Sanjay Kumar Rai
- 1999: B. S. Vinod
- 2000: Amit Kumar Saha
- 2001: Sanjay Kumar Rai
- 2002: Shiv Shanker Yadav
- 2003: Sanjay Kumar Rai
- 2004: Maha Singh
- 2005: Shiv Shanker Yadav

=== Triple jump ===
- 1988: Murali Sridharan
- 1989: Mohamed Nizamuddin
- 1990: Mohamed Nizamuddin
- 1991: Mohamed Nizamuddin
- 1992: Satnam Singh
- 1993: Rajinder Singh
- 1994: T. M. Martin
- 1995: ?
- 1996: Bobby George
- 1997: ?
- 1998: Premchandra Singh
- 1999: P. D. Venkaiah
- 2000: Amarjit Singh
- 2001: Sanjay Kumar Rai
- 2002: Amarjit Singh
- 2003: Sanjay Dewadi
- 2004: Amarjit Singh
- 2005: Renjith Maheshwary

=== Shot put ===
- 1988: Balwinder Singh
- 1989: Shirappa D. Eashan
- 1990: Shirappa D. Eashan
- 1991: Satkaran Singh
- 1992: Manjeet Singh
- 1993: Satkaran Singh
- 1994: Kent Larsson (SWE)
- 1995: ?
- 1996: Jogesh Kumar Singh
- 1997: ?
- 1998: Bahadur Singh Sagoo
- 1999: Shakti Singh
- 2000: Jaiveer Singh
- 2001: Bahadur Singh Sagoo
- 2002: Shakti Singh
- 2003: Bahadur Singh Sagoo
- 2004: Ranvijay Singh
- 2005: Navpreet Singh

=== Discus throw ===
- 1988: Sarjit Singh
- 1989: Shakti Singh
- 1990: Manjeet Singh
- 1991: Shakti Singh
- 1992: Ajit Bhaduria
- 1993: Shakti Singh
- 1994: Lars Riedel (GER)
- 1995: ?
- 1996: Ajit Bhaduria
- 1997: ?
- 1998: Anil Kumar
- 1999: Shakti Singh
- 2000: Krishna Kumar Sharma
- 2001: Anil Kumar
- 2002: Hridayanand Singh
- 2003: Anil sangwan
- 2004: Sukhveer Singh
- 2005: Amritpal Singh

=== Hammer throw ===
- 1988: Piarey Lal
- 1989: Raghubir Singh Bal
- 1990: Jasdev Singh Waraich
- 1991: Hari Prasad Rajesh Bhardwaj
- 1992: Om Prakash
- 1993: Hari Prasad Rajesh Bhardwaj
- 1994: Hari Prasad Rajesh Bhardwaj
- 1995: ?
- 1996: Anoop Singh Punia
- 1997: ?
- 1998: Virender Singh Punia
- 1999: Pramod Kumar Tiwari
- 2000: Rupinder Pal Singh
- 2001: Pramod Kumar Tiwari
- 2002: Pramod Kumar Tiwari
- 2003: Pramod Kumar Tiwari
- 2004: Harpal Singh
- 2005: Nirbhay Singh

=== Javelin throw ===
- 1988: Shyamdar Batuk Mishra
- 1989: Shyamdar Batuk Mishra
- 1990: Shyamdar Batuk Mishra
- 1991: Satbir Singh Saran
- 1992: Satbir Singh Saran
- 1993: Yusuf Khan
- 1994: Dag Wennlund (SWE)
- 1995: ?
- 1996: Jagdish Kumar Bishnoi
- 1997: ?
- 1998: Jagdish Kumar Bishnoi
- 1999: Ramandeep Singh
- 2000: Om Prakash Dudi
- 2001: Jagdish Kumar Bishnoi
- 2002: Harminder Singh
- 2003: Fazal Ansari
- 2004: Gajendra Kumar
- 2005: Anil Kumar

=== Decathlon ===
- 1988: Satyadev Singh
- 1989: Babu Shetty
- 1990: T. K. Sebastian
- 1991: T. K. Sebastian
- 1992: Anil Kumar Singh
- 1993: Anil Kumar Singh
- 1994: Anil Kumar Singh
- 1995: ?
- 1996: A. D. Ganpathi
- 1997: ?
- 1998: Jagdish Singh
- 1999: Kulwinder Singh
- 2000: Kulwinder Singh
- 2001: Kulwinder Singh
- 2002: Kulwinder Singh
- 2003: Kulwinder Singh
- 2004: Kulwinder Singh
- 2005: Kulwinder Singh

=== 20 kilometres walk ===
The event was held on a track from 2002 to 2004.

- 1996: Gurdeep Singh
- 1997: ?
- 1998: Sudhir Nandyal
- 1999: Gurdev Singh
- 2000: Amrik Singh
- 2001: Gurdev Singh
- 2002: Sitaram Basat
- 2003: Sitaram Basat
- 2004: Vijaykumar Gehlot
- 2005: Gurmeet Singh

=== 50 kilometres walk ===
- 2005: Gurdev Singh

== Women ==
=== 100 metres ===
- 1988: Zenia Ayrton
- 1989: P. T. Usha
- 1990: Ashwini Nachappa
- 1991: Ashwini Nachappa
- 1992: Zenia Ayrton
- 1993: Zenia Ayrton
- 1994: Celena Mondie-Milner (USA)
- 1995: ?
- 1996: E. B. Shyla
- 1997: ?
- 1998: Rachita Mistry
- 1999: P. T. Usha
- 2000: Saraswati Saha
- 2001: Kavitha Pandya
- 2002: Saraswati Saha
- 2003: Saraswati Saha
- 2004: Poonam Tomar
- 2005: Poonam Tomar

=== 200 metres ===
- 1988: Ashwini Nachappa
- 1989: Ashwini Nachappa
- 1990: Ashwini Nachappa
- 1991: Ashwini Nachappa
- 1992: Zenia Ayrton
- 1993: Kutty Saramma
- 1994: Pauline Davis-Thompson (BAH)
- 1995: ?
- 1996: T. Lavanya Reddy
- 1997: ?
- 1998: Vinitha Tripathi
- 1999: P. T. Usha
- 2000: V. Pandeeshwari
- 2001: Kavitha Pandya
- 2002: Saraswati Saha
- 2003: Saraswati Saha
- 2004: Manjeet Kaur
- 2005: Babita B. Singh

=== 400 metres ===
- 1988: Mercy Kuttan
- 1989: P. T. Usha
- 1990: P. T. Usha
- 1991: Ashwini Nachappa
- 1992: Shiny Abraham
- 1993: Kutty Saramma
- 1994: Pauline Davis-Thompson (BAH)
- 1995: ?
- 1996: Jyotirmoyee Sikdar
- 1997: ?
- 1998: Jyotirmoyee Sikdar
- 1999: K. M. Beenamol
- 2000: K. M. Beenamol
- 2001: K. M. Beenamol
- 2002: K. M. Beenamol
- 2003: Pinki Pramanik
- 2004: Sathi Geetha
- 2005: Pinki Pramanik

=== 800 metres ===
- 1988: Rosa Kutty
- 1989: Shiny Abraham
- 1990: Rosa Kutty
- 1991: Alphonsa P. Rayan
- 1992: Shiny Abraham
- 1993: Shiny Abraham
- 1994: Nadezhda Loboyko (RUS)
- 1995: ?
- 1996: Rosa Kutty
- 1997: ?
- 1998: Jyotirmoyee Sikdar
- 1999: Rosa Kutty
- 2000: Inderjeet Kaur
- 2001: C. Latha
- 2002: K. M. Beenamol
- 2003: Sunita
- 2004: Sunita Kumari
- 2005: Pinki Pramanik

=== 1500 metres ===
- 1988: Vijay Neelmani Khalko
- 1989: Rosa Kutty
- 1990: Rosa Kutty
- 1991: Aparna Bhoyar
- 1992: Aparna Bhoyar
- 1993: Jyotirmoyee Sikdar
- 1994: Jyotirmoyee Sikdar
- 1995: ?
- 1996: Vaishali Fating
- 1997: ?
- 1998: Sunita Rani
- 1999: Sunita Rani
- 2000: K. P. Sudha
- 2001: Sunita Dahiya
- 2002: Harjeet Kaur
- 2003: Sunita Rani
- 2004: Sunita Kumari
- 2005: Orchatteri Puthiyavgetil Jaisha

=== 3000 metres ===
- 1988: Vijay Neelmani Khalko
- 1989: Molly Chacko
- 1990: Molly Chacko
- 1991: Lukose Leelamma
- 1992: Molly Chacko
- 1993: Aparna Bhoyar
- 1994: Yelena Romanova (RUS)

=== 5000 metres ===
- 1996: Madhuri A. Saxena
- 1997: ?
- 1998: Sunita Rani
- 1999: Sunita Rani
- 2000: Molly Biju
- 2001: Madhuri Gurnule
- 2002: Pumpa Chanda
- 2003: Madhuri Gurnule
- 2004: Preeja Sridharan
- 2005: Orchatteri Puthiyavgetil Jaisha

=== 10,000 metres ===
- 1988: Nanda Jadhav
- 1989: ?
- 1990: Nanda Jadhav
- 1991: Vally Sathyabhama
- 1992: Lukose Leelamma
- 1993: Lukose Leelamma
- 1994: Lukose Leelamma
- 1995: ?
- 1996: Raini Saini
- 1997: ?
- 1998: Pushpa Devi
- 1999: Molly Biju
- 2000: Reena Das
- 2001: Madhuri Gurnule
- 2002: Lashram Aruna Devi
- 2003: Lashram Aruna Devi
- 2004: Lashram Aruna Devi
- 2005: Lashram Aruna Devi

=== 3000 metres steeplechase ===
- 2003: B. Hemalatha
- 2004: B. L. Bharathi
- 2005: L. Manjula

=== 100 metres hurdles ===
- 1988: Kum Kum Mondal
- 1989: Reeth Abraham
- 1990: Vimla Singh
- 1991: Vimla Singh
- 1992: Anuradha Biswal
- 1993: Kamala K. Geetha
- 1994: Kamala K. Geetha
- 1995: ?
- 1996: Debi Bose
- 1997: ?
- 1998: Debi Bose
- 1999: Anuradha Biswal
- 2000: Debi Dey
- 2001: Anuradha Biswal
- 2002: Anuradha Biswal
- 2003: Kadayam Natrajan Priya
- 2004: Soma Biswas
- 2005: Anuradha Biswal

=== 400 metres hurdles ===
- 1988: Kum Kum Mondal
- 1989: Shantimol Philips
- 1990: Shantimol Philips
- 1991: Shantimol Philips
- 1992: Sylvina Pais
- 1993: Sylvina Pais
- 1994: Anna Knoroz (RUS)
- 1995: ?
- 1996: M. K. Asha
- 1997: ?
- 1998: Lissamma Joseph
- 1999: Sahebani Oram
- 2000: Asik Bebi
- 2001: Sahebani Oram
- 2002: S. Rosalin Arockia Mary
- 2003: Chitra Soman
- 2004: Babita Choudhary
- 2005: Pooja Jakhar

=== High jump ===
- 1988: Angela Lincy
- 1989: Angela Lincy
- 1990: Angela Lincy
- 1991: Angela Lincy
- 1992: P. S. Bindu
- 1993: Angela Lincy
- 1994: P. S. Bindu
- 1995: ?
- 1996: Bobby Aloysius
- 1997: ?
- 1998: Bobby Aloysius
- 1999: S. Jayanthi
- 2000: A. K. Deepa
- 2001: Mohan Sangeetha
- 2002: Sarita Patil
- 2003: Sahana Kumari
- 2004: Sahana Kumari
- 2005: Tessymol Joseph

=== Pole vault ===
- 1999: Anupama
- 2000: Karamjeet Kaur
- 2001: Karamjeet Kaur
- 2002: Karamjeet Kaur
- 2003: V. S. Surekha
- 2004: V. S. Surekha
- 2005: Chetna Solanki

=== Long jump ===
- 1988: Rekhai Lal
- 1989: Reeth Abraham
- 1990: Reeth Abraham
- 1991: Reeth Abraham
- 1992: Lekha Thomas
- 1993: Mujeetha Begum
- 1994: Larysa Berezhna (UKR)
- 1995: ?
- 1996: M. Madhavi
- 1997: ?
- 1998: Lekha Thomas
- 1999: Anju Bobby Markose
- 2000: G. Pramila Ganapathy
- 2001: G. Pramila Ganapathy
- 2002: Anju Bobby George
- 2003: J. J. Shobha
- 2004: G. Pramila Ganapathy
- 2005: M. A. Prajusha

=== Triple jump ===
- 1996: Lekha Thomas
- 1997: ?
- 1998: Lekha Thomas
- 1999: Reena Thomas
- 2000: Manisha Dey
- 2001: Lekha Roy
- 2002: Manisha Dey
- 2003: Manisha Dey
- 2004: Tincy Mathew
- 2005: Tessymol Joseph

=== Shot put ===
- 1988: Rajwinder Kaur
- 1989: Rajwinder Kaur
- 1990: Mukti Das
- 1991: Mukti Das
- 1992: Amandeep Kaur
- 1993: Amandeep Kaur
- 1994: Amandeep Kaur
- 1995: ?
- 1996: Harbans Kaur
- 1997: ?
- 1998: Harbans Kaur
- 1999: Saroj Sihad Kumari
- 2000: Surinderjeet Kaur
- 2001: Nicholas Latha
- 2002: Nicholas Latha
- 2003: Nicholas Latha
- 2004: Nicholas Latha
- 2005: Nicholas Latha

=== Discus throw ===
- 1988: Gurmeet Kaur
- 1989: Neelam Kumari
- 1990: Neelam Jaswant Singh
- 1991: Harpreet Kaur
- 1992: Baljeet Kaur
- 1993: Neelam Jaswant Singh
- 1994: Aye Aye Nwe (MYA)
- 1995: ?
- 1996: Neelam Jaswant Singh
- 1997: ?
- 1998: Neelam Jaswant Singh
- 1999: Neelam Jaswant Singh
- 2000: Seema Punia
- 2001: Neelam Jaswant Singh
- 2002: Neelam Jaswant Singh
- 2003: Neelam Jaswant Singh
- 2004: Neelam Jaswant Singh
- 2005: Saroj Sihag

=== Hammer throw ===
- 1996: Surinderjeet Kaur
- 1997: Bhupinder Singh
- 1998: K. Jebeshori Devi
- 1999: K. Jebeshori Devi
- 2000: Hardeep Kaur
- 2001: Hardeep Kaur
- 2002: Hardeep Kaur
- 2003: Hardeep Kaur
- 2004: Archana Bara
- 2005: Ritu Rani

=== Javelin throw ===
- 1988: Shiny Verghese
- 1989: Razia Sheikh
- 1990: Razia Sheikh
- 1991: Razia Sheikh
- 1992: Gurbari Hembran
- 1993: Gurmeet Kaur
- 1994: Sushama Behera
- 1995: ?
- 1996: Gurmeet Kaur
- 1997: Bupinder Singh
- 1998: Gurmeet Kaur
- 1999: Manisha Mondal
- 2000: Gurmeet Kaur
- 2001: Manisha Mondal
- 2002: Gurmeet Kaur
- 2003: Gurmeet Kaur
- 2004: Megha Pardeshi
- 2005: Gurmeet Kaur

=== Heptathlon ===
- 1988: Jolly Joseph
- 1989: Kamala K. Geetha
- 1990: Kamala K. Geetha
- 1991: Kamala K. Geetha
- 1992: Kamala K. Geetha
- 1993: Kamala K. Geetha
- 1994: R. Chitra
- 1995: ?
- 1996: B. N. Sumavathy
- 1997: ?
- 1998: G. Pramila Ganapathy
- 1999: G. Pramila Ganapathy
- 2000: Soma Biswas
- 2001: Soma Biswas
- 2002: P. Bindu
- 2003: J. J. Shobha
- 2004: Sushmitha Singha Roy
- 2005: M. P. Sinimol

=== 10 kilometres walk ===
- 1996: Jiji Jose
- 1997: ?
- 1998: Paramjeet Kaur
- 1999: Jasmin Kaur
- 2000: Yumnam Bala Devi

=== 20 kilometres walk ===
The event was held on a track from 2002 to 2004.

- 2001: Jasmin Kaur
- 2002: Yumnam Bala Devi
- 2003: Jasmin Kaur
- 2004: Yumnam Bala Devi
- 2005: Amandeep Kaur
