= List of South Asian Games gold medalists in athletics =

List of games gold medalists

Athletics competitions have been held at the South Asian Games since the inaugural edition of the South Asian Federation Games in 1984 in Kathmandu, Nepal.

== Gold medalists ==
=== Men's 100 metres ===
- 1984: Adille Sumariwalla (IND)
- 1985: Mohammed Shah Alam (BAN)
- 1987: Mohammed Shah Alam (BAN)
- 1989: Anand Natarajan (IND)
- 1991: Sriyath Subash Dissanayake (SRI)
- 1993: Bimal Chandra Tarafdar (BAN)
- 1995: Chintake De Zoysa (SRI)
- 1999: Anil Kumar Prakash (IND)
- 2004: Piyush Kumar (IND)
- 2006: Umanga Surendra (SRI)
- 2010: Shehan Ambepitiya (SRI)
- 2016: Himasha Eashan (SRI)
- 2019: Hassan Saaid (MDV)

=== Men's 200 metres ===
- 1984: Hemalal Priyankara (SRI)
- 1985: Neelapu Rami Reddy (IND)
- 1987: Anand Shetty (IND)
- 1989: Arjun Devaiah (IND)
- 1991: Sriyath Subash Dissanayake (SRI)
- 1993: Sriyath Subash Dissanayake (SRI)
- 1995: Mohammed Mahbub Alam (BAN)
- 1999: Ahmed Maqsood (PAK)
- 2004: Rohan Pradeep Kumara (SRI)
- 2006: Rohan Pradeep Kumara (SRI)
- 2010: Abdul Najeeb Qureshi (IND)
- 2016: Vinoj Suranjaya (SRI)
- 2019: Uzair Rehman (PAK)

=== Men's 400 metres ===
- 1984: E.M. Chandratilake (SRI)
- 1985: E.M. Chandratilake (SRI)
- 1987: Muhammad Fiaz (PAK)
- 1989: Muhammad Sadaqat (PAK)
- 1991: Muhammad Sadaqat (PAK)
- 1993: Sugath Thilakaratne (SRI)
- 1995: Sugath Thilakaratne (SRI)
- 1999: Rohan Pradeep Kumara (SRI)
- 2004: Rohan Pradeep Kumara (SRI)
- 2006: Rohan Pradeep Kumara (SRI)
- 2010: Bibin Mathew (IND)
- 2016: Arokia Rajiv (IND)
- 2019: Aruna Darshana (SRI)

=== Men's 800 metres ===
- 1985: Hakem Singh (IND)
- 1987: Budhwa Oraon (IND)
- 1989: Nadir Khan (PAK)
- 1991: Jossey Mathew (IND)
- 1993: Ranjit Subasinghe (SRI)
- 1995: Rajbir Singh Jakhar (IND)
- 1999: Vellasamy Ratnakumara (SRI)
- 2004: S. Mohamed H. Sifrath (SRI)
- 2006: Francis Sagayaraj (IND)
- 2016: Indunil Herath (SRI)
- 2019: Indunil Herath (SRI)

=== Men's 1500 metres ===
- 1984: Bagicha Singh (IND)
- 1985: Budhwa Oraon (IND)
- 1987: Bagicha Singh (IND)
- 1989: Ram Niwas (IND)
- 1991: Nadir Khan (PAK)
- 1993: Bahadur Prasad (IND)
- 1995: Bahadur Prasad (IND)
- 1999: Gulab Chand (IND)
- 2004: Atta Miran (PAK)
- 2006: Hamza Chatholi (IND)
- 2010: Chaminda Wijekoon (SRI)
- 2016: Ajay Kumar Saroj (IND)
- 2019: Ajay Kumar Saroj (IND)

=== Men's 5000 metres ===
- 1984: Gurnam Singh (IND)
- 1985: Tara Singh (IND)
- 1987: Dhanbir Singh (IND)
- 1989: Bahadur Prasad (IND)
- 1991: Bahadur Prasad (IND)
- 1993: Bahadur Prasad (IND)
- 1995: Bahadur Prasad (IND)
- 1999: Krishnan Shankar (IND)
- 2004: Noushad Khan (PAK)
- 2006: Surendra Kumar Singh (IND)
- 2010: Sunil Kumar (IND)
- 2016: Man Singh (IND)
- 2019: Gopi Chandra Parki (NEP)

=== Men's 10,000 metres ===
- 1984: Inder Singh (IND)
- 1985: Tara Singh (IND)
- 1987: Tara Singh (IND)
- 1989: Mamak Khan (PAK)
- 1991: Kuruppu Karunaratne (SRI)
- 1993: Bahadur Prasad (IND)
- 1995: Krishnan Shankar (IND)
- 1999: Krishnan Shankar (IND)
- 2004: Not held
- 2006: Surendra Singh (IND)
- 2016: Gopi T (IND)
- 2019: Suresh Kumar (IND)

=== Men's marathon ===
- 1984: Baikuntha Manandhar (NEP)
- 1985: Baikuntha Manandhar (NEP)
- 1987: Baikuntha Manandhar (NEP)
- 1989: V.K.L. Samarasinghe (SRI)
- 1991: Kuruppu Karunaratne (SRI)
- 1993: Kuruppu Karunaratne (SRI)
- 1995: Tika Banadur Bogoti (NEP)
- 1999: Sarath Prasanna Gamage (SRI)
- 2004: Anuradha Cooray (SRI)
- 2006: Ajit Bandara (SRI)
- 2010: Rajendra Bahadur Bhandari (NEP)
- 2016: Nitendra Singh Rawat (IND)
- 2019: Kiran Bogati (NEP)

=== Men's 3000 metres steeplechase ===
- 1987: S. Shamsuddin (IND)
- 1989: Abdul Razzaq (PAK)
- 1991: Not held
- 1993: Narinder Singh (IND)
- 1995: Narinder Singh (IND)
- 1999: Amrish Kumar (IND)
- 2004: Upendra Indika Bandara (SRI)
- 2006: Om Prakash (IND)

=== Men's 110 metres hurdles ===
- 1985: Manzoor Ahmed (PAK)
- 1987: Ashish Mondal (IND)
- 1989: Ghulam Abbas (PAK)
- 1991: Ghulam Abbas (PAK)
- 1993: Chaminda Fonseka (SRI)
- 1995: Mahesh Perera (SRI)
- 1999: Mahesh Perera (SRI)
- 2004: Abdul Rashid (PAK)
- 2006: Mafuzur Rahman (BAN)
- 2010: Mohsin Ali (PAK)
- 2016: Jayakumar Surendhar (IND)
- 2019: Jayakumar Surendhar (IND)

=== Men's 400 metres hurdles ===
- 1985: Basant Singh (IND)
- 1987: Shahid Mahmood (PAK)
- 1989: Ghulam Abbas (PAK)
- 1991: Ghulam Abbas (PAK)
- 1993: Muhammad Amin (PAK)
- 1995: Mahesh Perera (SRI)
- 1999: Allah Ditta (PAK)
- 2004: Allah Ditta (PAK)
- 2006: Allah Ditta (PAK)
- 2010: T. Balamurugan (IND)
- 2016: Ayyasamy Dharun (IND)
- 2019: M. P. Jabir (IND)

=== Men's high jump ===
- 1987: Nalluswamy Annavi (IND)
- 1989: Nalluswamy Annavi (IND)
- 1991: Patrick Saparamadu (SRI)
- 1993: Chander Pal Ratni (IND)
- 1995: Not held
- 1999: Nagendra Prasad (IND)
- 2004: Manjula Kumara (SRI)
- 2006: Manjula Kumara (SRI)
- 2010: Harishankar Roy (IND)
- 2016: Manjula Kumara (SRI)
- 2019: Sarvesh Anil Kushare (IND)

=== Men's pole vault ===
- 1987: Sunder Singh Tanwar (IND)
- 1989: M.A. Eldo (IND)

1999 : (Selvaraj)/IND

- 2006: Muhammad Ayub (PAK)
- 2016: Ishara Sandaruwan (SRI)

=== Men's long jump ===
- 1984: Hemant Kumar Patel (IND)
- 1985: Hemant Kumar Patel (IND)
- 1987: Shyam Kumar Sunder (IND)
- 1989: Muhammad Urfaq (PAK)
- 1991: Shyam Kumar Sunder (IND)
- 1993: Benildus Fernando (SRI)
- 1995: Benildus Fernando (SRI)
- 1999: P.K. Sujith Rohitha (SRI)
- 2004: [[Lorans

(long jumper)|Maha Singh]] (IND)

- 2006: Lorans (IND)
- 2010: Mohammad Ibrar (IND)
- 2016: Ankit Sharma (IND)
- 2019: Lokesh Sathyanathan (IND)

=== Men's triple jump ===
- 1984: Mujibar Rahman Malik (BAN)
- 1985: Rajinder Singh (IND)
- 1987: Haider Ali Shah (PAK)
- 1989: Haider Ali Shah (PAK)
- 1991: Benaras Khan (PAK)
- 1993: Chandimal Niroshan (SRI)
- 1995: B.S. Vinod (IND)
- 1999: Sanjay Raj Kumar (IND)
- 2004: Amarjit Singh (IND)
- 2006: Chaminda Sampath (SRI)
- 2010: Zafar Iqbal (PAK)
- 2016: Renjith Maheshwary (IND)
- 2019: Karthik Unnikrishnan (IND)

=== Men's shot put ===
- 1984: Iqbal Singh (IND)
- 1985: Gurmeet Singh (IND)
- 1987: Avtar Singh (IND)
- 1989: Kafayat Hussain (PAK)
- 1991: Ghufrain Hussain (PAK)
- 1993: Ghufrain Hussain (PAK)
- 1995: Bahadur Singh Sagoo (IND)
- 1999: Bahadur Singh Sagoo (IND)
- 2004: Ranvijay Singh (IND)
- 2006: Sourabh Vij (IND)
- 2016: Om Prakash Karhana (IND)
- 2019: Tejinder Pal Singh Toor (IND)

=== Men's discus throw ===
- 1987: Surjeet Singh (IND)
- 1989: Manjeet Singh (IND)
- 1991: Shakti Singh (IND)
- 1993: Shakti Singh (IND)
- 1995: Shakti Singh (IND)
- 1999: Hridayanand Singh (IND)
- 2004: Hridayanand Singh (IND)
- 2006: Basharat Ali (PAK)
- 2010: Basharat Ali (PAK)
- 2016: Arjun (IND)
- 2019: Kirpal Singh Batth (IND)

=== Men's hammer throw ===
- 1987: Surinder Singh (IND)
- 1989: Raghubir Singh Bal (IND)
- 1991: Not held
- 1993: Jasdev Singh Waraich (IND)
- 1995: Aqarab Abbas (PAK)
- 1999: Pramod Kumar Tiwari (IND)
- 2004: Nadeen Ahamed (PAK)
- 2016: Neeraj Kumar (IND)

=== Men's javelin throw ===
- 1984: Saran Singh (IND)
- 1985: Muhammad Rashid (PAK)
- 1987: Muhammad Rashid (PAK)
- 1989: Muhammad Rashid (PAK)
- 1991: Muhammad Rashid (PAK)
- 1993: Daljeet Singh (IND)
- 1995: Jagdish Kumar Bishnoi (IND)
- 1999: Jagdish Kumar Bishnoi (IND)
- 2004: Lijesh Kumar (IND)
- 2006: Kingsly Gunathilake (SRI)
- 2010: Kashinath Naik (IND)
- 2016: Neeraj Chopra (IND)
- 2019: Arshad Nadeem (PAK)

=== Men's 4 × 100 metres relay ===
- 1984: Bangladesh (BAN)
- 1985: Bangladesh (BAN)
- 1987: India (IND)
- 1989: India (IND)
- 1991: Sri Lanka (SRI)
- 1993: Sri Lanka (SRI)
- 1995: India (IND)
- 1999: India (IND)
- 2004: India (IND)
- 2006: India (IND)
- 2010: Sri Lanka (SRI)
- 2016: Sri Lanka (SRI)
- 2019: Sri Lanka (SRI)

=== Men's 4 × 400 metres relay ===
- 1984: Sri Lanka (SRI)
- 1985: India (IND)
- 1987: Pakistan (PAK)
- 1989: Pakistan (PAK)
- 1991: Pakistan (PAK)
- 1993: Sri Lanka (SRI)
- 1995: Sri Lanka (SRI)
- 1999: Sri Lanka (SRI)
- 2004: Sri Lanka (SRI)
- 2006: Sri Lanka (SRI)
- 2010: India (IND)
- 2016: India (IND)
- 2019: Sri Lanka (SRI)

=== Women's 100 metres ===
- 1984: Simone van Heer (SRI)
- 1985: Sany Joseph (IND)
- 1987: Sany Joseph (IND)
- 1989: Ashwini Nachappa (IND)
- 1991: Damayanthi Dharsha (SRI)
- 1993: Damayanthi Dharsha (SRI)
- 1995: Susanthika Jayasinghe (SRI)
- 1999: Damayanthi Dharsha (SRI)
- 2004: Jani Chathurangani (SRI)
- 2006: Susanthika Jayasinghe (SRI)
- 2010: Naseem Hameed (PAK)
- 2016: Rumeshika Rathnayake (SRI)
- 2019: Archana Suseendran (IND)

=== Women's 200 metres ===
- 1984: Ramani Mangalika (SRI)
- 1985: Shiny Abraham (IND)
- 1987: P. T. Usha (IND)
- 1989: Ashwini Nachappa (IND)
- 1991: Kutty Saramma (IND)
- 1993: Damayanthi Dharsha (SRI)
- 1995: Susanthika Jayasinghe (SRI)
- 1999: Damayanthi Dharsha (SRI)
- 2004: Susanthika Jayasinghe (SRI)
- 2006: Susanthika Jayasinghe (SRI)
- 2010: Chandrika Subashini (SRI)
- 2016: Srabani Nanda (IND)
- 2019: Archana Suseendran (IND)

=== Women's 400 metres ===
- 1984: Shiny Abraham (IND)
- 1985: Saroj Lakra (IND)
- 1987: P. T. Usha (IND)
- 1989: Shiny Abraham (IND)
- 1991: Jayamini Illeperuma (SRI)
- 1993: Kutty Saramma (IND)
- 1995: Shiny Abraham (IND)
- 1999: Damayanthi Dharsha (SRI)
- 2004: Sathi Geetha (IND)
- 2006: Pinki Pramanik (IND)
- 2010: Chandrika Subashini (SRI)
- 2016: M. R. Poovamma (IND)
- 2019: Dilshi Kumarasinghe (SRI)

=== Women's 800 metres ===
- 1985: Shiny Abraham (IND)
- 1987: Shiny Abraham (IND)
- 1989: Shiny Abraham (IND)
- 1991: Sriyani Dhammika Menike (SRI)
- 1993: Shiny Abraham (IND)
- 1995: Shiny Abraham (IND)
- 1999: K. M. Beenamol (IND)
- 2004: Madhuri A. Singh (IND)
- 2006: Pinki Pramanik (IND)
- 2016: Nimali Liyanarachchi (SRI)
- 2019: Dilshi Kumarasinghe (SRI)

=== Women's 1500 metres ===
- 1987: Suman Rawat (IND)
- 1989: Not held
- 1991: Sriyani Dhammika Menike (SRI)
- 1993: Molly Chacko (IND)
- 1995: Rosa Kutty (IND)
- 1999: Sunita Rani (IND)
- 2004: Madhuri A. Singh (IND)
- 2006: Santhi Soundarajan (IND)
- 2016: P. U. Chitra (IND)
- 2019: Nilani Rathnayake (SRI)

=== Women's 3000 metres ===
- 1987: Suman Rawat (IND)
- 1989: Not held
- 1991: Molly Chacko (IND)

=== Women's 5000 metres ===
- 1995: Madhuri A. Saxena (IND)
- 1999: Sunita Rani (IND)
- 2006: O. P. Jaisha (IND)
- 2016: L. Suriya (IND)
- 2019: Nilani Rathnayake (SRI)

=== Women's 10,000 metres ===
- 1987: Suman Rawat (IND)
- 1989: Not held
- 1991: Sujeewa Nilmini Jayasena (SRI)
- 1993: Sunita Rani (IND)
- 2006: Preeja Sreedharan (IND)
- 2016: L. Suriya (IND)
- 2019: Santoshi Shrestha (NEP)

=== Women's marathon ===
- 1995: Vally Sathyabhama (IND)
- 1999: Rigzin Angmo (IND)
- 2016: Kavita Raut (IND)
- 2019: Hiruni Wijayaratne (SRI)

=== Women's 100 metres hurdles ===
- 1987: Thilaka Jinadasa (SRI)
- 1989: Reeth Abraham (IND)
- 1991: Sriyani Kulawansa (SRI)
- 1993: Sriyani Kulawansa (SRI)
- 1995: Sriyani Kulawansa (SRI)
- 1999: Sriyani Kulawansa (SRI)
- 2004: Sriyani Kulawansa (SRI)
- 2006: Anuradha Biswal (IND)
- 2010: Gayathri Govindaraj (IND)
- 2016: Gayathri Govindaraj (IND)
- 2019: Lakshika Sugandi (SRI)

=== Women's 400 metres hurdles ===
- 1987: P. T. Usha (IND)
- 1989: Not held
- 1991: Yamuna Jayalath Yapa (SRI)
- 1993: Not held
- 1995: M.K. Asha (IND)
- 2016: Jauna Murmu (IND)
- 2019: Najma Parveen (PAK)

=== Women's high jump ===
- 1987: Angela Lincy (IND)
- 1989: Not held
- 1991: Sriyani Kulawansa (SRI)
- 1993: Bobby Aloysius (IND)
- 1995: Bobby Aloysius (IND)
- 1999: Rehana Kausar (PAK)
- 2004: Sangeetha Mohan (IND)
- 2006: Dulanjalee Ranasinghe (SRI)
- 2010: Priyangika Madumanthi (SRI)
- 2016: Sahana Kumari (IND)
- 2019: Jishna M. (IND)

=== Women's long jump ===
- 1985: Dileema Peterson (SRI)
- 1987: Mercy Kutta (IND)
- 1989: Reeth Abraham (IND)
- 1991: Reeth Abraham (IND)
- 1993: Shabana Akhtar (PAK)
- 1995: Shabana Akhtar (PAK)
- 1999: G. Pramila Ganapathy (IND)
- 2004: Jetty C. Joseph (IND)
- 2006: Anju Bobby George (IND)
- 2010: Chamali Dilrukshi (SRI)
- 2016: Mayookha Johny (IND)
- 2019: Sarangi Silva (SRI)

=== Women's triple jump ===
- 2016: Mayookha Johny (IND)
- 2019: Hashini Paboda (SRI)

=== Women's shot put ===
- 1985: Vijaymala Bhanot (IND)
- 1987: Vijaymala Bhanot (IND)
- 1989: Rajwinder Kaur (IND)
- 1991: Amandeep Kaur (IND)
- 1993: Amandeep Kaur (IND)
- 1995: Amandeep Kaur (IND)
- 1999: Surinderjeet Kaur (IND)
- 2004: Latha Nicholas (IND)
- 2006: Saroj Sihag (IND)
- 2016: Manpreet Kaur (IND)
- 2019: Abha Khatua (IND)

=== Women's discus throw ===
- 1987: Vijaymala Bhanot (IND)
- 1989: Neelam Kumari (IND)
- 1991: Promila Bharali (IND)
- 1993: Harjeet Kaur (IND)
- 1995: Neelam Jaswant Singh (IND)
- 1999: Not held
- 2004: Seema Punia (IND)
- 2006: Padma Nandani Wijesundara (SRI)
- 2019: Navjeet Dhillon (IND)

=== Women's javelin throw ===
- 1985: Jolle James (IND)
- 1987: Razia Sheikh (IND)
- 1989: Vijita P. Amarasekara (SRI)
- 1991: Vijita P. Amarasekara (SRI)
- 1993: Not held
- 1995: Gurmeet Kaur (IND)
- 1999: Gurmeet Kaur (IND)
- 2004: Anne Maheshi De Silva (SRI)
- 2006: Nadeeka Lakmali (SRI)
- 2016: Suman Devi (IND)
- 2019: Dilhani Lekamge (SRI)

=== Women's 4 × 100 metres relay ===
- 1984: India (IND)
- 1985: India (IND)
- 1987: India (IND)
- 1989: India (IND)
- 1991: Sri Lanka (SRI)
- 1993: India (IND)
- 1995: Sri Lanka (SRI)
- 1999: India (IND)
- 2004: Sri Lanka (SRI)
- 2006: India (IND)
- 2010: Sri Lanka (SRI)
- 2016: Sri Lanka (SRI)
- 2019: Sri Lanka (SRI)

=== Women's 4 × 400 metres relay ===
- 1984: India (IND)
- 1985: India (IND)
- 1987: India (IND)
- 1989: Not held
- 1991: India (IND)
- 1993: India (IND)
- 1995: India (IND)
- 1999: India (IND)
- 2004: India (IND)
- 2006: India (IND)
- 2010: India (IND)
- 2016: India (IND)
- 2019: Sri Lanka (SRI)
