= 1990 Asian Junior Athletics Championships =

3rd Asian Junior Championships
- Dates: 13 – 16 June
- Host city: Beijing, China
- Level: Junior (under-20)
- Events: 40

The 1990 Asian Junior Athletics Championships was the third edition of the international athletics competition for Asian under-20 athletes, organised by the Asian Athletics Association. It took place from 13–16 June in Beijing, China. A total of 40 events were contested, 22 for male athletes and 18 for female athletes.

== Medal summary ==
=== Men ===
Event	Gold		Silver		Bronze	
100 metres	Yoshihisa Ono (JPN)	10.76	Xia Xianghai (CHN)	10.79	Zhao Haohan (CHN)	10.84
200 metres	Takuya Yui (JPN)	21.05	Li Xiaopeng (CHN)	21.34	Ibrahim Ismail Muftah (QAT)	21.39
400 metres	Ibrahim Ismail Muftah (QAT)	46.91	Li Yuanwu (CHN)	47.91	Masayoshi Kan (JPN)	47.97
800 metres	Ding Weifeng (CHN)	1:49.57	Zhou Chaohui (CHN)	1:49.76	Kim Yong-Hwan (KOR)	1:50.09
1500 metres	Kim Yong-Hwan (KOR)	3:50.06	Ryuji Takei (JPN)	3:50.81	Wang Xinjun (CHN)	3:52.16
5000 metres	Seiji Kushibe (JPN)	14:43.43	Abdullah Yousef Abdullah (QAT)	14:44.64	Fang Min-Son (PRK)	14:46.85
10,000 metres	Abdullah Yousef Abdullah (QAT)	30:29.90	Yu Yeong-Hun (KOR)	30:30.21	Xu Mingzhu (CHN)	30:32.82
110 metres hurdles	Takeshi Iwasa (JPN)	14.34	Keiichiro Seki (JPN)	14.42	Chen Yanhao (CHN)	14.45
400 metres hurdles	Yoshihiko Saito (JPN)	50.89 CR	Kazuhiko Yamazaki (JPN)	52.35	Yang Guangjun (CHN)	52.44
3000 metres steeplechase	Sun Ripeng (CHN)	8:55.68	Li Wen (CHN)	9:01.77	Jamal Abdi Hassan (QAT)	9:08.98
4 × 100 m relay	Japan (JPN); Yoshihisa Ono; Nobuharu Asahara; Takuya Yui; Noritomo Aoyama	40.95	China (CHN); Xia Xianghai; Zhao Haohan; Zhou Haiping; Zheng Xianguo	41.36	Thailand (THA); Viroj Anuparp; Songrit Weingban; Niti Piyapan; Somchai Wongsim	41.57
4 × 400 m relay	Japan (JPN); Kazuhiko Yamazaki; Masayoshi Kan; Yoshihiko Saito; Takuya Yui	3:12.47	China (CHN); Gao Hanming; Zhu Lidong; Li Yuanwu; Zhang Wei	3:13.02	Chinese Taipei (TPE); Chen Fang-Cheng; Chou Rong-Ting; Lee Chung-Jen; Chiu Wensheng	3:18.29
10,000 metres walk	Li Mingcai (CHN)	43:31.31 CR	Mao Xinyuan (CHN)	45:07.11	Ye Liansheng (CHN)	46:20.51
High jump	Lee Jin-Taek (KOR)	2.20 m CR	Li Jianhong (CHN)	2.15 m	Hirokazu Kasai (JPN)	2.15 m
Pole vault	Lin Shijing (CHN)	5.01 m CR	Liu Zhiyong (CHN) Ying Hui (CHN)	4.60 m	Not awarded	
Long jump	Sun Tai-San (TPE)	7.54 m (w)	Nobuharu Asahara (JPN)	7.49 m	Song Leijie (CHN)	7.43 m (w)
Triple jump	Wang Chaohui (CHN)	15.76 m	Mou Xiaohui (CHN)	15.71 m	Noriyuki Matsui (JPN)	15.61 m
Shot put	Xie Shengying (CHN)	18.51 m CR	Zhang Zouwen (CHN)	16.92 m	Bilal Saad Mubarak (QAT)	16.48 m
Discus throw	Li Yongmin (CHN)	52.78 m CR	Han Feng (CHN)	51.20 m	Qu Jinzhu (CHN)	50.30 m
Hammer throw	Xu Weili (CHN)	63.10 m CR	Jiang Xingdong (CHN)	59.52 m	An Mufeng (CHN)	57.52 m
Javelin throw	Yasuo Nakamura (JPN)	71.24 m	Sun Fuhai (CHN)	69.62 m	Li Rongxiang (CHN)	69.00 m
Decathlon	Zheng Jun (CHN)	7191 pts CR	Guo Zhengrong (CHN)	6930 pts	Chuan Chi-Cheng (TPE)	6604 pts

=== Women ===
Event	Gold		Silver		Bronze	
100 metres (Wind: +2.9 m/s)	Wang Lei (CHN)	11.63 w	Xiao Yehua (CHN)	11.66 w	Zenia Ayrton (IND)	11.95 w
200 metres	Pei Fang (CHN)	23.52 CR	Liu Xiaomei (CHN)	24.22	Hsu Pei-Chin (TPE)	24.59
400 metres	Ma Yuqin (CHN)	53.38 CR	Liu Youlan (CHN)	54.90	Kutty Saramma (IND)	55.07
800 metres	Liu Li (CHN)	2:03.97 CR	Zhang Yumei (CHN)	2:06.63	Tao Chunmiao (CHN)	2:06.78
1500 metres	Qu Yunxia (CHN)	4:11.89 CR	Xiujun Chang (CHN)	4:17.25	Li Myong-Hui (PRK)	4:17.97
3000 metres	Li Ying (CHN)	9:19.41	Hatsumi Matsumoto (JPN)	9:23.68	Wang Yanfang (CHN)	9:25.26
10,000 metres	Rika Ota (JPN)	33:55.45	Zhu Ruixia (CHN)	34:02.48	Tomoe Abe (JPN)	34:16.84
100 metres hurdles	Zhang Yu (CHN)	13.45 CR	Sun Xue (CHN)	13.66	Li Xiaoyan (CHN)	14.06
400 metres hurdles	Leng Xueyan (CHN)	57.97 CR	Li Yan (CHN)	60.45	Fang Kunyao (CHN)	60.62
4 × 100 m relay	China (CHN); Wang Lei; Yu Yanyun; Xiao Yehua; Hu Ling	46.32	Chinese Taipei (TPE); Hsu Pei-Chin; Wang Shu-Ling; Liu Shu-Hua; Pan Shu-Chi	46.43	South Korea (KOR); Park Jong-Im; Wi Mi-Jin; Ko Hwa-Ja; Byun Yeong-Rye	46.75
4 × 400 m relay	China (CHN); Ma Yuqin; Lu Ping; Liu Youlan; Leng Xueyan	3:46.11	Chinese Taipei (TPE); Lin Shu-Huei; Kao Yuh-Chuan; Huang Chuen-Li; Wang Pei-shun	3:47.88	Thailand (THA); Sriprai Chaikaew; Supak Kulsirirat; Srirat Chimrak; Naparut Suajongprue	3:50.29
5000 metres walk	Kong Yan (CHN)	21:58.30 CR	Cui Yingzi (CHN)	22:09.67	Sun Yan (CHN)	23:46.24
High jump	Zhao Yangwu (CHN)	1.88 m	Guan Shumin (CHN)	1.85 m	Wang Juan (CHN)	1.82 m
Long jump	Liu Jingmin (CHN)	6.57 m (w)	Yang Zhanxiang (CHN)	6.14 m	Fan Yangjuan (CHN)	6.02 m (w)
Shot put	Qiu Qiaoping (CHN)	18.66 m CR	Li Xiaoyun (CHN)	18.33 m	Lu Xia (CHN)	15.94 m
Discus throw	Qiu Qiaoping (CHN)	60.14 m CR	Yuan Wei (CHN)	57.24 m	Wang Enfang (CHN)	49.26 m
Javelin throw	Hou Lili (CHN)	58.40 m	Liu Cui (CHN)	54.58 m	Zhang Ru (CHN)	54.52 m
Heptathlon	Zhang Xiaohui (CHN)	5368 pts	Ma Chun-Ping (TPE)	5286 pts	Liu Bo (CHN)	5152 pts

== Medal table ==
Rank	Nation	Gold	Silver	Bronze	Total
1	China (CHN)	26	31	21	78
2	Japan (JPN)	9	5	4	18
3	Qatar (QAT)	2	1	3	6
4	South Korea (KOR)	2	1	2	5
5	Chinese Taipei (TPE)	1	3	3	7
6	India (IND)	0	0	2	2
6	North Korea (PRK)	0	0	2	2
6	Thailand (THA)	0	0	2	2
Totals (8 entries)		40	41	39	120

== Results ==
=== Women's 100 metres ===
The women's 100 metres event at the 1990 Asian Junior Athletics Championships was held in Beijing, China on 13 June.

==== Medalists ====
Gold	Silver	Bronze
Wang Lei; China	Xiao Yehua; China	Zenia Ayrton; India

==== Heats ====
Wind:
Heat 1: +0.7 m/s, Heat 2: +1.2 m/s, Heat 3: +1.2 m/s

Rank	Heat	Name	Nationality	Time	Notes
1	1	Xiao Yehua	China	11.78	Q
2	2	Wang Lei	China	12.00	Q
3	1	Zenia Ayrton	India	12.09	Q
4	2	Wi Mi-jin	South Korea	12.18	Q
5	3	Yu Yanyun	China	12.20	Q
6	2	Hsu Pei-chin	Chinese Taipei	12.25	q
7	3	Leung Wai Kwan	Hong Kong	12.28	Q
8	1	Fumie Yamazaki	Japan	12.34	q
9	1	Ko Hwa-ja	South Korea	12.37	
9	1	Wang Shu-ling	Chinese Taipei	12.37	
11	3	Rachita Panda	India	12.44	
12	2	Edna Punelas	Philippines	12.47	
13	3	Nednapa Chommuak	Thailand	12.50	
14	2	Pirat Pengma	Thailand	12.65	
15	3	Woon Siew Gian	Malaysia	12.72	
16	3	Khok Chiew Hoay	Singapore	12.93	
17	3	Jennifer Ferrer	Philippines	13.08	
18	2	Ng Sou Peng	Macau	13.10	
19	2	Chun Kwok Ying	Hong Kong	13.24	
20	1	Cheong Tsui Shan	Macau	14.58	

==== Final ====
Wind: +2.9 m/s

Rank	Name	Nationality	Time	Notes
1st place, gold medalist(s)	Wang Lei	China	11.63	w
2nd place, silver medalist(s)	Xiao Yehua	China	11.66	w
3rd place, bronze medalist(s)	Zenia Ayrton	India	11.46	w
4	Leung Wai Kwan	Hong Kong	12.02	w
5	Wi Mi-jin	South Korea	12.11	w
6	Hsu Pei-chin	China	12.13	w
7	Fumie Yamazaki	Japan	12.14	w
8	Yu Yanyun	China	12.17	w

=== Women's 400 metres ===
The women's 400 metres event at the 1990 Asian Junior Athletics Championships was held in Beijing, China on 13–14 June.

==== Medalists ====
Gold	Silver	Bronze
Ma Yuqin; China	Liu Youlan; China	Kutty Saramma; India

==== Heats ====
Rank	Heat	Name	Nationality	Time	Notes
1	1	Ma Yuqin	China	55.25	Q
2	2	Liu Youlan	China	55.82	Q
3	1	Rabia Abdul Salam	Malaysia	55.97	Q
4	1	Lin Shu-huei	Chinese Taipei	56.09	Q
5	2	Park Jong-im	South Korea	56.52	Q
6	3	Lu Ping	China	56.91	Q
7	3	Kutty Saramma	India	57.00	Q
8	1	Supak Kulsirirat	Thailand	57.79	Q
9	3	Chew Gin Peng	Malaysia	57.90	
10	2	Kao Yuh-chuan	Chinese Taipei	58.11	
11	2	Joanna Feria	Philippines	1:00.92	
12	1	Marife Suanque	Philippines	1:03.71	
13	3	Tam Fung Man	Hong Kong	1:04.60	
14	2	Choi Hiu Nam	Hong Kong	1:05.19	
15	2	G. Srestha	Nepal	1:07.34	

==== Final ====
Rank	Name	Nationality	Time	Notes
1st place, gold medalist(s)	Ma Yuqin	China	53.38	
2nd place, silver medalist(s)	Liu Youlan	China	54.90	
3rd place, bronze medalist(s)	Kutty Saramma	India	55.07	
4	Rabia Abdul Salam	Malaysia	55.40	
5	Park Jong-im	South Korea	55.98	
6	Lu Ping	China	56.31	
7	Lin Shu-huei	Chinese Taipei	56.62	
8	Supak Kulsirirat	Thailand	57.38	

=== Women's 4 × 100 metres relay ===
The women's 4 × 100 metres relay event at the 1990 Asian Junior Athletics Championships was held in Beijing, China on 16 June.

Rank	Team	Name	Time	Notes
1st place, gold medalist(s)	China	Wang Lei, Yu Yanyun, Xiao Yehua, Hu Ling	46.32	
2nd place, silver medalist(s)	Chinese Taipei	Hsu Pei-chinl, Wang Shu-ling, Liu Shu-Hua, Pan Shu-chi	46.43	
3rd place, bronze medalist(s)	South Korea	Park Jong-im, Wi Mi-jin, Ko Hwa-ja, Byun Yeong-rye	46.75	
4	India	Jonomani Sakia, Kutty Saramma, Rachita Mistry, Zenia Ayrton	47.22	
5	Thailand	Nednapa Chommuak, Pirat Pengma, Bongkoch Kroeihonsri, Supak Kulsirirat	47.64	
6	Malaysia	Chua Viu Phin, Woon Siew Gian, Chew Gin Peng, Lynn Marie Reutens	48.03	
7	Philippines	Jennifer Ferrer, Edna Punelas, Joanna Feria, Marife Suanque	50.04	
	Hong Kong	Leung Wai Kwan, Chun Kwok Ying, Wan Kin Yee, Kylie van den Bosch	DQ	
