= Kaushalya Madushani =

Sri Lankan track and field athlete (1995–2022)

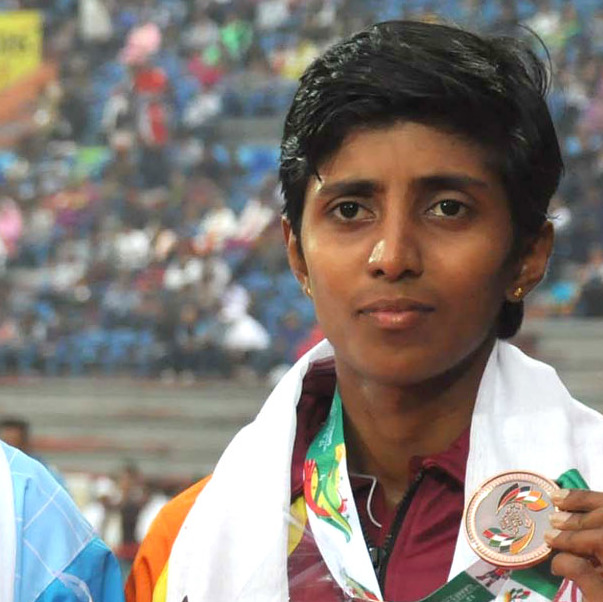

Personal information
- Full name: Kawshalya Madushani Edirippulilage
- Born: 13 December 1995
- Died: 24 April 2022 (aged 26) Dummalasuriya, Sri Lanka
- Education: Kuliyapitiya Central College

Sport
- Sport: Athletics
- Event(s): 400 m hurdles, 4 × 400 metres relay
- Club: Sri Lankan Army
- Coached by: Nalinda Senarath
Medal record
women's Athletics
Representing Sri Lanka
South Asian Games
Gold medal – first place	2019 Kathmandu	4 × 400 m relay
Silver medal – second place	2019 Kathmandu	400 m hurdles
Bronze medal – third place	2016 Guwahati	400 m hurdles

Kaushalya Madushani (Sinhala: කෞෂල්‍යා මධුෂානි; 13 December 1995 – 24 April 2022), also known as Kawshalya Madushani Edirippulilage or Kaushalya Madhushani, was a Sri Lankan track and field athlete who mainly competed in the hurdles event. She was a five-time national champion in the women's 400m hurdles (2016, 2017, 2019, 2021 and 2022). She was the defending national champion in women's 400m hurdles prior to her death when she defended her title successfully in 2022. She was a member of the Sri Lankan Army.

== Career ==
During the 2014 Asian Junior Athletics Championships, she claimed a silver medal in the women's 400m hurdles event which was held in Taipei. She clinched gold medal in the women's 400m hurdles event during the 2016 National Athletics Championships which was also her first national title and was subsequently selected as the best hurdler in the competition. She also claimed gold in the women's 400m hurdles during the 2016 National Sports Festival.

She made her South Asian Games debut representing Sri Lanka in 2016. She went on to claim her first South Asian Games medal in her maiden South Asian Games appearance when she won a bronze medal in the women's 400m hurdles. She claimed her second national title at the 2017 National Athletics Championships which she successfully defended.

She also represented Sri Lanka at the 2019 South Asian Games and claimed two medals in the multi-sport event including a gold in the women's 4 × 400 m relay team event (along with Omaya Udayangani, Gayanthika Abeyratne, and Dilshi Kumarasinghe) and a silver in the women's 400m hurdles. She achieved her personal best of 58.16 seconds in 2019. She achieved her third national title in women's 400m hurdles at the 2019 National Athletics Championships. She won the national title for the fourth time in women's 400m hurdles during the 2021 National Athletics Championships.

In April 2022, she again emerged as the winner in the women's 400m hurdles category at the 100th National Athletics Championships with a timing of 58.73 seconds and it also marked her fifth national title.

On 23 April 2022, one day before her death, she was conferred with the Glucolin Challenge Trophy for best hurdler in recognition of her notable performances at the 2022 National Athletics Championship.

== Personal life ==
Kaushalya Madushani was born on 13 December 1995. She was a student athlete at Kuliyapitiya Central College, and she was coached by Nalinda Senarath. She served as a lance corporal in the Sri Lankan Army.

On 24 April 2022, Madushani was found dead at the age of 26 at her residence in Dummalasuriya after an awards ceremony. Kuliyapitiya Police reported that she was found hanging inside her home.

== See also ==
- List of South Asian Games gold medalists in athletics
- List of Sri Lankan sportspeople
