= List of Indian sportswomen =

This List of Indian Sportswomen includes Indian female sportspersons who brought laurels for the country at the international stage.

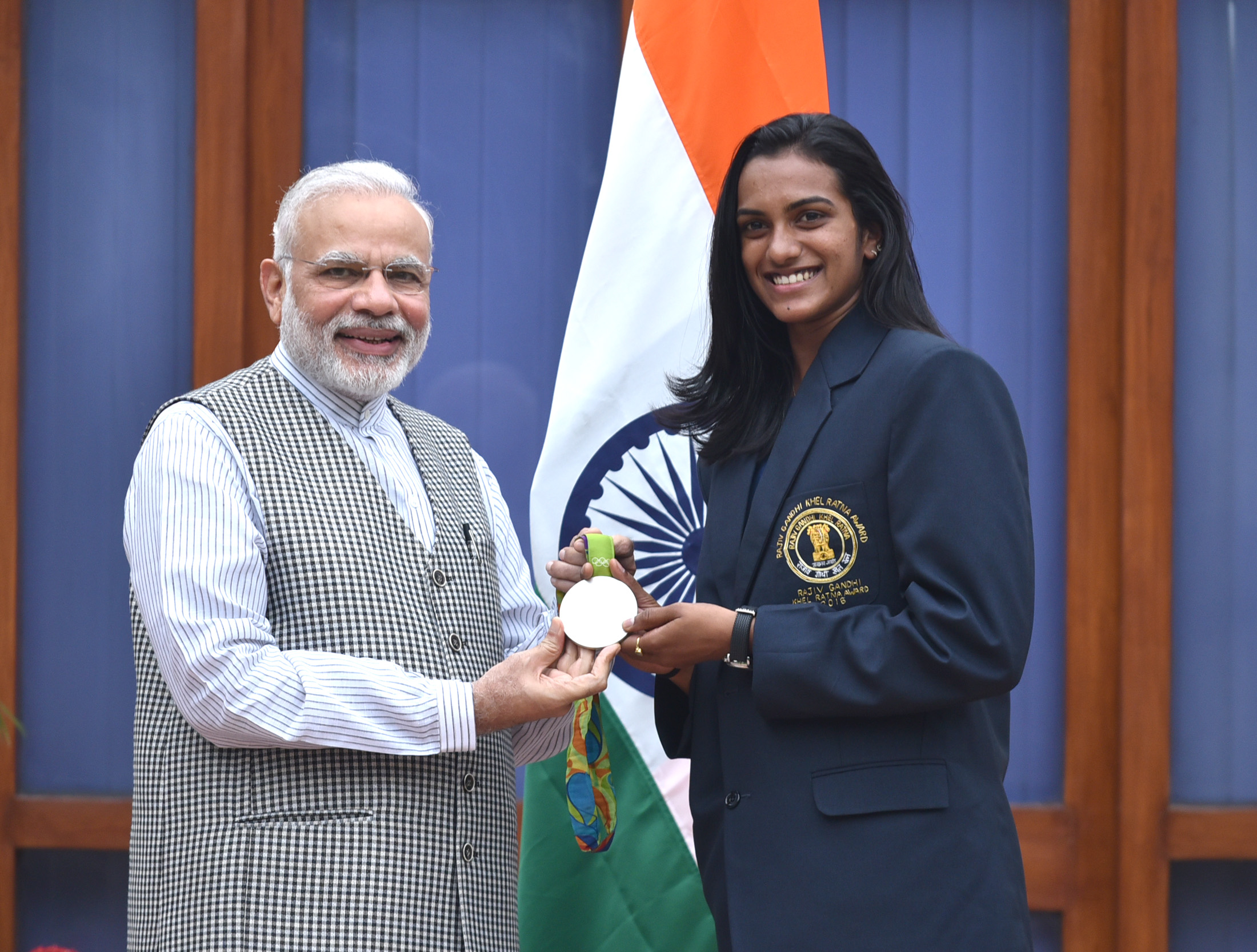
Indian professional badminton player P.V.Sindhu.

- Anjali Bhagwat, Shooting - Conferred with Rajiv Gandhi Khel Ratna Award, Arjuna Award.
- Anju Bobby George, Long Jump
- Apurvi Chandela, Air rifle shooting
- Anisa Sayyed, Shooting
- Anjum Chopra, Cricket - Conferred with Arjuna Award
- Anmol Kharb, Badminton
- Anuradha Biswal, Track and field
- Aparna Popat, Badminton - Conferred with Arjuna Award
- Asha Agarwal, Track and field - Conferred with Arjuna Award
- Ashwini Ponnappa, Badminton - Conferred with Arjuna Award
- Ashwini Nachappa
- Bobby Aloysius, Track and field
- Beenamol, Track and field - Conferred with Rajiv Gandhi Khel Ratna Award, Padma Shri, Arjuna Award.
- Bula Choudhury, Swimming - Conferred with Padma Shri, Arjuna Award.
- Chekrovolu Swuro, Archery - Conferred with Arjuna Award
- Chhanda Gayen, Mountaineering - first Bengali woman to climb Mount Everest
- Dipa Karmakar, Gymnastics - Came fourth in the 2016 Rio Olympics, Conferred with Khel Ratna
- Babita Kumari Phogat, Wrestling
- Deepika Kumari, Archery - Conferred with Arjuna Award
- Deepika Thakur, Hockey - Conferred with Arjuna Award
- Dola Banerjee, Archery - Conferred with Arjuna Award
- Divya Singh, Basketball
- Dronavalli Harika, Chess - Conferred with Arjuna Award
- Dutee Chand, Track and Field
- Esha Singh, Shooting sports
- Geeta Zutshi, Track and field - Conferred with Padma Shri, Arjuna Award.
- Geeta Phogat, Wrestling
- Geetika Jakhar, Wrestling - Conferred with Arjuna Award
- Joshna Chinappa, Squash
- Harwant Kaur, Track and field
- Hima Das, Track and field
- Jyotirmoyee Sikdar, Track and field - Conferred with Rajiv Gandhi Khel Ratna Award, Padma Shri, Arjuna Award.
- Jhulan Goswami, Cricket - Conferred with Arjuna Award
- Jwala Gutta, Badminton - Conferred with Arjuna Award
- Kamaljeet Sandhu, Track and field - Conferred with Padma Shri
- Kavita Chahal, Boxing - Conferred with Arjuna Award
- Kavita Raut, Track and field
- Koneru Humpy, Chess - Conferred with Padma Shri, Arjuna Award.
- Karnam Malleswari, Weightlifting - Conferred with Rajiv Gandhi Khel Ratna Award, Padma Shri, Arjuna Award, bronze medal in the 2000 Summer Olympics at Sydney lifting 110 kg.
- Kunjarani Devi, Weightlifting - Conferred with Rajiv Gandhi Khel Ratna Award, Arjuna Award.
- Krishna Poonia, Track and field
- Krushnaa Patil, Mountaineering
- Mary D'Souza Sequeira, is a field hockey player, conferred with Dhyan Chand Award.
- Mary Kom, Women's boxing - Conferred with Rajiv Gandhi Khel Ratna Award, Padma Shri, Arjuna Award.
- M D Valsamma, Track and field - Conferred with Padma Shri, Arjuna Award.
- Prajusha Maliakkal, Track and field
- Manjeet Kaur, Track and field - Conferred with Arjuna Award
- Madhumita Bisht, Badminton - Conferred with Padma Shri, Arjuna Award.
- Mithali Raj, Cricket - Conferred with Arjuna Award
- Neelam Jaswant Singh, Track and field - Conferred with Arjuna Award
- Neetu Chandra, Taekwondo - First Indian actress to compete in two international games
- Neha Aggarwal, Table tennis
- Nisha Millet, Swimming - Conferred with Arjuna Award
- Prashanti Singh, Basketball - Conferred with Padma Shri, Arjuna Award
- P. V. Sindhu, Badminton - Conferred with Padma Bhushan, Arjuna Award
- Pinki Pramanik Track and field
- Poulomi Ghatak, Table Tennis - Conferred with Arjuna Award
- Pragnya Mohan, Triathlon
- Pritam Rani Siwach, Hockey - Conferred with Arjuna Award
- Rahi Sarnobat, Shooting
- Manu Bhaker, Shooting
- Reeth Abraham, Track and field - Conferred with Arjuna Award
- Tayabun Nisha, Track and field.
- Renubala Chanu, Weightlifting
- Razia Sheikh, Track and field
- Santhi Soundarajan, Track and field - Winner of 11 International Medals for India and 50 for her home state Tamil Nadu.
- Saina Nehwal, Badminton - Conferred with Rajiv Gandhi Khel Ratna Award, Padma Shri, Arjuna Award.
- Sakshi Malik, Wrestling - Won bronze medal at Rio Olympics 2016.
- Sania Mirza, Tennis - Conferred with Padma Shri, Arjuna Award.
- Sandhya Agarwal, Cricket - Conferred with Arjuna Award
- Sarjubala Devi, Boxer - 2011 AIBA Youth World Boxing Championships gold medalist.
- Sonam Malik, Wrestling
- Shikha Tandon, Swimming - Conferred with Arjuna Award
- Shiny Abraham, Track and field - Conferred with Padma Shri, Arjuna Award.
- J. J. Shobha, Track and field - Conferred with Arjuna Award
- Seema Antil, Track and field
- Smriti Mandhana, Cricket - Conferred with Arjuna Award
- Soma Biswas, Track and field - Conferred with Arjuna Award
- Stephie D'Souza, Track and field - Conferred with Arjuna Award
- Sumitra Nayak, Rugby
- Sunita Rani, Track and field - Conferred with Padma Shri, Arjuna Award.
- Subbaraman Vijayalakshmi, Chess - Conferred with Arjuna Award
- Unnati Hooda, Badminton
- P. T. Usha, Track and field - Conferred with Padma Shri, Arjuna Award.
- Tania Sachdev, Chess - Conferred with Arjuna Award

== See also ==
- Sport in India
