= Ma Yuqin =

Chinese sprinter (born 1972)

Personal information
- Nationality: Chinese
- Born: 11 September 1972 (age 53) Xingtai, Hebei
- Height: 1.65 m (5 ft 5 in)
- Weight: 57 kg (126 lb)

Sport
- Sport: Athletics
- Event(s): 200 metres, 400 metres
Medal record
Women's athletics
Representing China
Asian Championships
Gold medal – first place	1993 Manila	400 m
Gold medal – first place	1993 Manila	4×400 m

Ma Yuqin (born 11 September 1972 in Xingtai) is a Chinese sprinter who specialized in the 400 metres.

== Early years ==
In 1988, Ma joined the Hebei Track and Field team.

Her talent was revealed during the 1990 edition of the Asian junior championships. There, she took part in the 400 metres and the 4 x 400 metres relay. In the 400 m, she won her heat in 55.25 seconds before claiming the final in 53.38 seconds, ahead of fellow Liu Youlan. Then, both teamed up for the 4 x 400 m with Lu Ping and Leng Xueyan they to take the gold medal.

In September 1991, at only 19, she improved Li Guilian's national record on 400 m of 52.13 seconds to 52.04 seconds, during the Chinese City Games held in Tangshan.

== Senior career ==
Ma participated in the 1992 IAAF World Cup in Havana, her first international outing. There, representing Asia, she competed in the 4 x 400 m with India's Shiny Abraham and Kutty Saramma and fellow Cao Chunying. The team eventually finished eighth of the race in a poor time of 3:41.94.

However, 1993 marked Ma's real breakthrough. In April of that year, she set the Asian record in the 400 m in a time of 50.94 seconds during a low-key meet in Shijiazhuang. A month later, at the National Championships in Jinan, she improved it to 50.86.

She was subsequently qualified for the famous 1993 National Games of China in September. On September 11, her 21st birthday, she broke her own Asian record, for the third time that year, clocking a world-leading time of 49.81 seconds. On September 12, she set a personal best of 22.95 seconds in the 200 m. On September 13, Ma anchored the Hebei's 4 x 400 m relay team featuring An Xiaohong, Cao Chunying and Bai Xiaoyun to break the Asian record in 3:24.28. Her records still stand today. She was then selected for the Asian Championships in December in Manila, where she easily won the 400 m title in 51.23 seconds.

1994 started off well for Ma as she successfully defended her National title in the 400 m in 50.45 seconds during the Chinese Championships held in Beijing. This enabled her to participate in the Asian Games in Hiroshima. There, she stamped her authority in the 400 m by winning her heat in 52.35 seconds and then the final in 51.17. The Chinese 4 x 400 m, composed of Leng Xueyan, Zhang Hengyun, Cao Chunying and Ma won the event in 3:29.11.

At the 1995 edition of World Indoor Championships, she competed with Zhang Hengyun, Lu Xifang and Cao Chunying on 4 x 400m. The team finished fifth and last of the race but set a new area record in the process.

Her last appearance was in May 1997 where she ran a 400 m in 53.28 seconds.

== Achievements ==
Year	Competition	Venue	Position	Event	Notes
Representing China
1990	Asian Junior Championships	Beijing	1st	400m	53.38
1990	Asian Junior Championships	Beijing	1st	4 x 400m	3.46.11
1992	World Cup	Havana	8th	4 x 400m	3:41.94
1993	National Games of China	Beijing	1st	400m	49.81 (WL) (AR)
1993	National Games of China	Beijing	1st	4 x 400m	3.24.28 (AR)
1993	Asian Championships	Manila	1st	400m	51.23
1994	Asian Games	Hiroshima	1st	400m	51.17
1994	Asian Games	Hiroshima	1st	4 x 400m	3:29.11
1995	World Indoor Championships	Barcelona	5th	4 x 400m	3.39.76 (AR)
