= Madukka =

- village
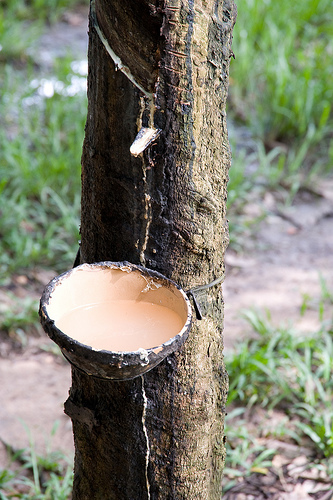
- Rubber is the lifeline of the village
- Interactive map of Madukka
- Coordinates: 9°29′0″N 76°56′0″E
- Country: India
- State: Kerala
- District: Kottayam

Government
  - Body: Koruthode Grama Panchayath

Languages
  - Official: Malayalam, English
- Time zone: UTC+5:30 (IST)
- PIN: 686 513
- Vehicle registration: KL-34
- Nearest city: Mundakayam
- Civic agency: Koruthode Grama Panchayath

Madukka is a small village surrounded by forest located in the district of Kottayam, Kerala.

== Geography ==
Madukka is a small village surrounded by dense forest and with hilly terrain.

== Transport ==
The village is well accessed by road transportation and public transportation facilities are available to major towns like Kottayam and Changanacherry. The nearest railway station is Kottayam Railway Station. The nearest airport is Cochin International Airport.

From Kottayam: Kottayam-Pampady-Ponkunnam-Kanjirappally-Mundakkayam-Madukka
From Changanacherry: Changanacherry-Karukachal-Ponkunnam-Kanjirappally-Mundakkayam-Madukka

== Economy ==
The main source of economy depend on cultivation and farming. The main crops are latex, pepper and seasonal fruits like banana.

== Notable people ==
- Molly Chacko

== Places of worship ==
Puthenpally juma masjid, mahavishnu mahadeva Temple and St. Mathew's church are the important worship centres in Madukka. The population is predominantly Christian, Hindu, Muslim and Malayarayans.

== Cultural centers ==
- Sahrudaya Library and Sports Club
