= Haider Ali Shah =

Haider Ali Shah may refer:

- Haider Ali Shah (athlete) (born 1963), Pakistani Olympic triple jumper
- Haider Ali Shah (politician), Pakistani politician and National Assembly member for Hangu
