= Leng Xueyan =

Chinese hurdler

Medal record

Women's athletics

Representing China

Asian Games
Gold medal – first place	1994 Hiroshima	400 m hurdles
Gold medal – first place	1994 Hiroshima	4×400 m relay

Asian Championships
Gold medal – first place	1993 Manila	4×400 m
Silver medal – second place	1993 Manila	400 m hurdles

Leng Xueyan (Chinese: 冷雪艳; born 1972)^{[nb]} is a Chinese former track and field athlete who competed in the 400 metres hurdles. She was the Asian Games champion in 1994 and runner-up at the Asian Athletics Championships in 1993. She set a personal best of 54.52 seconds in 1993. She was also an Asian Games gold medalist in the 4×400 metres relay.

== Career ==
Leng's first international medal came at the 1990 Asian Junior Athletics Championships held in Beijing. She won the 400 m hurdles gold medal with a time of 57.79 seconds. This stood as the championship record for over a decade, finally being broken by another Chinese hurdler, Wang Xing, in 2004. She emerged as a senior athlete at the 1993 Chinese National Games with a performance of 54.52 seconds to claim third place in a race won in an Asian record by Han Qing. This time ranked Leng tenth in the world for the event that season.

Her senior international debut followed a few months later at the 1993 Asian Athletics Championships. At the competition in Manila she led the Chinese challenge in the 400 m hurdles and took the silver medal behind Kazakhstan's Natalya Torshina. In 1994 she won her first and only national title at the Chinese Athletics Championships with a time of 56.28 seconds. This gained her selection for China at the Asian Games later that year.

Leng defeated both Torshina and Hsu Pei-Ching of Chinese Taipei to become the Asian Games champion in the 400 m hurdles. She was the third Chinese woman to win the title, after inaugural winner Chen Xin (諶欣) and Chen Juying, who had won the previous edition. Her winning time of 55.26 seconds was an Asian Games record which lasted for twenty years. It was finally bettered in 2014 by Kemi Adekoya (a Nigerian-born runner for Bahrain). Originally, Leng had finished as runner-up to Han Qing, who was subsequently disqualified and banned for doping. She ran the lead-off leg of the 4×400 metres relay in a Chinese team of Zhang Hengyun, Cao Chunying and Ma Yuqin and the quartet won the gold medal in a Games record of 3:29.11 minutes (Leng's second of the tournament). Despite being only 22 years old, this was the last major medal of her career and 1994 was the last time she ranked in the top twenty athletes globally.

== National titles ==
- Chinese Athletics Championships
  - 400 m hurdles: 1994

== International competitions ==
Year	Competition	Venue	Position	Event	Notes
1990	Asian Junior Championships	Beijing, China	1st	400 m hurdles	57.79 CR
1993	Asian Championships	Manila, Philippines	2nd	400 m hurdles	57.02
1994	Asian Games	Hiroshima, Japan	1st	400 m hurdles	55.26 GR

== Notes ==
- ^{nb} There are conflicting sources for her birthdate, with the IAAF listing 14 February 1972 and other sources listing 11 January 1972.
