= Ren Tazawa =

Japanese long-distance runner

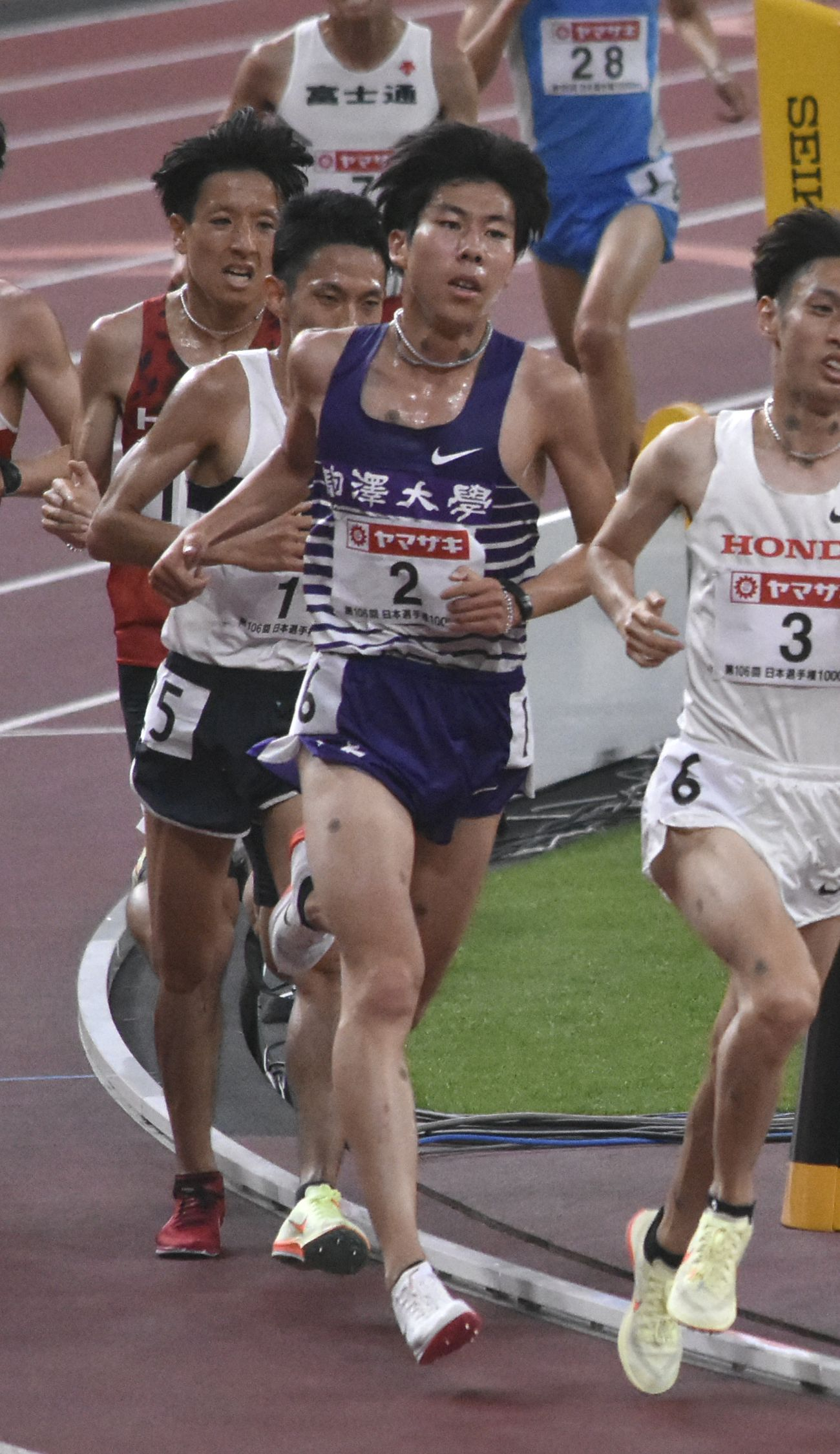

Personal information
- Born: 11 November 2000 (age 25) Hachinohe, Japan
- Height: 1.80 m (5 ft 11 in)
- Weight: 61 kg (134 lb)

Sport
- Sport: Athletics
- Events: 5000 metres; 10,000 metres
- University team: Komazawa University
Medal record
Representing Japan
Asian Championships
| Gold medal – first place | 2023 Bangkok | 10,000 metres |
Asian Junior Championships
| Silver medal – second place | 2018 Gifu | 5000 metres |

Ren Tazawa (田澤 廉, Tazawa Ren, born 11 November 2000) is a Japanese long-distance runner, who specializes in the 10,000 metres. He won the 10,000 metres at the 2023 Asian Athletics Championships.

== Personal bests ==
Outdoor

- 3000 metres – 8:27.43 (Sydney 2018)
- 5000 metres – 13:22.60 (Kumamoto 2022)
- 10,000 metres – 27:23.44 (Yokohama 2021)
