= Lukose Leelamma =

Indian athlete

Personal information
- Nationality: Indian

Sport
- Country: India
- Sport: Athletics
Medal record
Women's athletics
Representing India
Asian Championships
Silver medal – second place	1991 Kuala Lumpur	10000 m

Lukose Leelamma (born 23 May 1969) is an Indian athlete. She won a silver medal in 10000 metres in the 1991 Asian Athletics Championships. She was the National champion in 10000 metres in 1992, 1993, and 1994 and 3000 metres in 1991.
