= 2023 Asian Athletics Championships – Men's 10,000 metres =

Men's 10,000 metres at the 2023 Asian Athletics Championships
- Venue: National Stadium
- Location: Bangkok, Thailand
- Dates: 12 July
- Competitors: 16 from 11 nations
- Winning time: 29:18.44

Medalists
gold medal	Ren Tazawa	Japan
silver medal	Shadrack Kimutai	Kazakhstan
bronze medal	Abhishek Pal	India

The men's 10,000 metres event at the 2023 Asian Athletics Championships was held on 12 July.

== Records ==
Records before the 2023 Asian Athletics Championships
Record	Athlete (nation)	Time (s)	Location	Date
World record	Joshua Cheptegei (UGA)	26:11.00	Valencia, Spain	7 October 2020
Asian record	Ahmad Hassan Abdullah (QAT)	26:38.76	Brussels, Belgium	5 September 2003
Championship record	Hasan Mahboob (BHR)	28:23.70	Guangzhou, China	14 November 2009
World leading	Berihu Aregawi (ETH)	26:50.66	Nerja, Spain	23 June 2023
Asian leading	Ren Tazawa (JPN)	27:28.04	San Juan Capistrano, United States	4 March 2023

== Results ==
Rank	Name	Nationality	Time	Notes
1st place, gold medalist(s)	Ren Tazawa	Japan	29:18.44	
2nd place, silver medalist(s)	Shadrack Kimutai	Kazakhstan	29:31.63	
3rd place, bronze medalist(s)	Abhishek Pal	India	29:33.26	
4	Hayato Imae	Japan	29:34.28	
5	Gulveer Singh	India	29:53.69	
6	Gantulga Dambadarjaa	Mongolia	30:31.35	
7	Chen Tianyu	China	30:41.00	
8	Shokhrukh Davlyatov	Uzbekistan	30:59.80	
9	Rikki Martin Simbolon	Indonesia	31:17.12	
10	Deepak Adhikari	Nepal	31:18.96	
11	Agus Prayogo	Indonesia	31:39.75	
12	Sanchai Namkhet	Thailand	32:31.86	
13	Nattawut Innum	Thailand	32:31.86	
14	Arlan Arbois	Philippines	32:51.06	PB
15	Tse Chun Yin	Hong Kong	32:21.06	
	Sonny Wagdos	Philippines	DNF	
