= 2018 Asian Junior Athletics Championships =

18th Asian Junior Athletics Championships
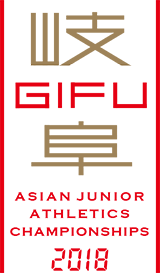
- Dates: 7–10 June
- Host city: Gifu, Japan
- Venue: Gifu Nagaragawa Stadium
- Level: Junior (under-20)
- Events: 44
- Participation: 437 athletes from 35 nations
- Records set: 6 championship records

The 2018 Asian Junior Athletics Championships was the 18th edition of the international athletics competition for Asian under-20 athletes, organised by the Asian Athletics Association and the Japan Association of Athletics Federations. Athletes born between 1999 and 2002 competed in 44 events, divided evenly between the sexes. The competition took place over four days from 7–10 June at Gifu Nagaragawa Stadium in Gifu, Japan.

== Medal table ==
* Host nation (Host nation)

Rank	Nation	Gold	Silver	Bronze	Total
1	Japan*	14	15	12	41
2	China	11	8	5	24
3	India	5	2	10	17
4	Chinese Taipei	4	5	3	12
5	Sri Lanka	3	4	2	9
6	Qatar	3	3	0	6
7	Iran	1	1	3	5
8	Indonesia	1	1	0	2
9	Iraq	1	0	1	2
9	Vietnam	1	0	1	2
11	South Korea	0	3	1	4
12	Kazakhstan	0	1	2	3
13	Thailand	0	1	1	2
14	Malaysia	0	0	2	2
15	Hong Kong	0	0	1	1
Totals (15 entries)		44	44	44	132

== Medal summary ==
=== Men ===
Event	Gold		Silver		Bronze	
100 metres	Lalu Muhammad Zohri; Indonesia	10.27	Daisuke Miyamoto; Japan	10.35	Muhammad Ismail; Malaysia	10.46
200 metres	Wei Tai-sheng; Chinese Taipei	21.05	Shin Min-kyu; South Korea	21.06	Justin Junpei Tsukamoto; Japan	21.09 PB
400 metres	Aruna Dharshana; Sri Lanka	45.79 CR NJR	Pasindu Kodikara; Sri Lanka	46.96	Syuji Mori; Japan	47.08
800 metres	Anu Kumar; India	1:54.11	Abdolrahim Dorzadeh; Iran	1:54.23	Fuki Torii; Japan	1:54.55
1500 metres	Saife Saifeldin; Qatar	3:49.30	Reito Hanzawa; Japan	3:49.66	Hussein Lafta; Iraq	3:49.75
5000 metres	Ajeet Kumar; India	14:15.24 PB	Ren Tazawa; Japan	14:17.26	Amir Zamanpour; Iran	14:25.25 PB
10,000 metres	Suolang Cairen; China	30:01.51 PB	Yuhi Nakaya; Japan	30:04.24	Kartik Kumar; India	30:05.30 PB
110 m hurdles	Lu Hao-hua; Chinese Taipei	13.61 PB	Rikuto Higuchi; Japan	13.71	David Yefremov; Kazakhstan	13.81
400 m hurdles	Yusuke Shirao; Japan	50.52	Bassem Hemeida; Qatar	50.55	Mehdi Pirjahan; Iran	51.18 PB
3000 m steeplechase	Saife Saifeldin; Qatar	8:51.97	Takumi Yoshida; Japan	8:52.79	Nguyễn Trung Cường; Vietnam	8:59.32 PB
10,000 m walk	Gong Hao; China	42:47.98	Sho Sakazaki; Japan	42:53.56	Kim Min-gyu; South Korea	43:06.89
4 × 100 m relay	Yuki Takagi; Daisuke Miyamoto; Satoru Fukushima; Justin Junpei Tsukamoto; Japan	39.65	Lin Yu-tang; Wei Tai-sheng; Lu Hao-hua; Yeh Shou-po; Chinese Taipei	39.72	Prajwal Ravi; Akash Kumar; Nithin Balakumar; Gurindervir Singh; India	40.75
4 × 400 m relay	Pabasara Niku; Pasindu Kodikara; Ravishka Indrajith; Aruna Dharshana; Sri Lanka	3:08.70	Potchara Petchkaew; Thipthanet Sripha; Yanakorn Munrot; Phitchaya Sunthonthuam; Thailand	3:09.20	Luqmanual Khairul Akmal; Muhammad Suhaimi; Safwan Saifuddin; Abdul Roslan; Malaysia	3:09.60
High jump	Kyohei Tomori; Japan	2.16 m PB	Nuh Anuh; Qatar	2.14 m	Zhang Hao; China	2.12 m
Pole vault	Syunto Ozaki; Japan	5.20 m PB	Idan Richsan; Indonesia	5.15 m	Kasinpob Chomchanad; Thailand	5.00 m
Long jump	Yugo Sakai; Japan	7.61 m	Zhou Keqi; China	7.54 m	M Sreeshankar; India	7.47 m
Triple jump	Kamalraj Kanagaraj; India	15.75 m	Yu Gyumin; South Korea	15.56 m PB	Shunsuke Izumiya; Japan	15.47 m
Shot put	Moaaz Ibrahim; Qatar	18.57 m PB	Yeo Jin-seong; South Korea	18.25 m	Ashish Bhalothia; India	18.22 m PB
Discus throw	Hossein Rasouli; Iran	62.29 m CR	Mohamed Ibrahim Moaaz; Qatar	61.50 m	Kosei Yamashita; Japan	56.51 m
Hammer throw	Ashish Jakhar; India	76.86 m PB	Damneet Singh; India	74.08 m PB	Masanobu Hattori; Japan	69.34 m
Javelin throw	Liu Zhekai; China	70.53 m	Masafumi Azechi; Japan	68.76 m	Kentaro Nakamura; Japan	65.36 m
Decathlon	Wang Chen-yu; Chinese Taipei	7200 pts PB	Wang Yu-shiang; Chinese Taipei	6704 pts PB	Rin Haraguchi; Japan	6693 pts

=== Women ===
Event	Gold		Silver		Bronze	
100 metres	Feng Lulu; China	11.68	Amasha De Silva; Sri Lanka	11.71 PB	Mei Kodama; Japan	11.98
200 metres	Tao Yanan; China	24.01	Amasha De Silva; Sri Lanka	24.47 PB	Jisna Mathew; India	24.48
400 metres	Jisna Mathew; India	53.26 PB	Dilshi Kumarasinghe; Sri Lanka	54.03 PB	Yang Jui-hsuan; Chinese Taipei	54.74
800 metres	Ayaka Kawata; Japan	2:04.14	Ayano Shiomi; Japan	2:04.50	Dilshi Kumarasinghe; Sri Lanka	2:04.53 PB NJR
1500 metres	Ririka Hironaka; Japan	4:17.62 PB	Tomomi Takamatsu; Japan	4:21.65	Durga Deore; India	4:24.56
3000 metres	Nozomi Tanaka; Japan	9:04.36 CR	Yuna Wada; Japan	9:14.13	Liu Fang; China	9:35.69
5000 metres	Mikuni Yada; Japan	16:31.65	Niu Lihua; China	16:55.54	Poonam Sonune; India	17:03.75
100 m hurdles	Yuiri Yoshida; Japan	13.45 CR PB	Lin Yuwei; China	13.55 PB	Lin Hsiao-hui; Chinese Taipei	13.61 PB
400 m hurdles	Kasumi Yoshida; Japan	58.43	Yang Jui-hsuan; Chinese Taipei	58.89 PB	Natsumi Murakami; Japan	58.92
3000 m steeplechase	Parami Wasanthi Maristela; Sri Lanka	10:21.54 PB NJR	Tian Wanhua; China	10:28.24	Yuka Nosue; Japan	10:38.30
10,000 m walk	Ma Li; China	45:20.59 CR	Nanako Fujii; Japan	45:24.35 PB	Li Wenxiu; China	47:38.46
4 × 100 m relay	Lin Yuwei; Zhu Cuiwei; Tao Yanan; Feng Lulu; China	45.06	Yuiri Yoshida; Miku Yamada; Yuri Okumura; Mei Kodama; Japan	45.95	Leung Wing Hei; Wu Yi Lam; Leung Kwan Yi; Chan Pui Kei; Hong Kong	47.00
4 × 400 m relay	Ayano Shiomi; Kasumi Yoshida; Natsumi Murakami; Ayaka Kawata; Japan	3:38.20 CR	Subha Venkatesan; Rachna; Nidhi Singh; Jisna Mathew; India	3:41.11	Ishara Adittya; Sachini Divyanjali; Amasha De Silva; Dilshi Kumarasinghe; Sri Lanka	3:45.16
High jump	Maryam Abdulelah; Iraq	1.80 m	Tsai Ching-jung; Chinese Taipei	1.78 m	Abhinaya Shetty; India	1.75 m PB
Pole vault	Wu Zuocheng; China	4.00 m	Anastasya Ermakova; Kazakhstan	3.60 m	Wu Chia-ju; Chinese Taipei	3.60 m
Long jump	Ayaka Kora; Japan	6.44 m PB	Zhong Jiawei; China	6.44 m	Mirei Yoshioka; Japan	5.92 m
Triple jump	Thi Ngoc Ha Vu; Vietnam	13.22 m	Pan Youqi; China	13.21 m	Priyadarshini Suresh; India	13.09 m PB
Shot put	Zhang Linru; China	16.05 m	Honoka Oyama; Japan	15.54 m PB	Guo Pei-yu; Chinese Taipei	14.76 m
Discus throw	Yang Huanhuan; China	51.53 m	Yin Yuanyuan; China	51.17 m	Arpandeep Bajwa; India	46.57 m
Hammer throw	Zhou Mengyuan; China	64.81 m	Li Jiangyan; China	61.44 m PB	Reyhaneh Arani; Iran	55.46 m PB
Javelin throw	Li Hui-jun; Chinese Taipei	55.36 m	Sae Takemoto; Japan	54.16 m	Dai Qianqian; China	53.29 m
Heptathlon	Karin Odama; Japan	5133 pts	Chen Cai-juan; Chinese Taipei	4925 pts	Diana Geints; Kazakhstan	4804 pts PB
