= A. Rathnayake Central College =

School in Kandy District, Sri Lanka

Walala A. Rathnayake Central College
- ඒ. රත්නායක මධ්‍ය විද්‍යාලය

Location
- Menikhinna, Central Province; Sri Lanka; 7.3189°N 80.6936°E

Information
- Type: Government school
- Motto: Be the first among the Central Colleges in Sri Lanka
- Established: 1944
- School district: Kandy District
- School number: 12001
- School code: 03214
- Staff: 90+
- Grades: 6–13
- Gender: Co-educational
- Enrollment: 2000+
- Campus size: 4.6 ha (11.37 acres)
- Colours: Red and yellow
- Website: "Walala A. Rathnayake Central College".

Walala A. Rathnayake Central College (Sinhala: ඒ. රත්නායක මධ්‍ය විද්‍යාලය) is a government co-educational school located in Walala, Menikhinna, in the Kandy District of Sri Lanka. Established in 1944, the college provides secondary education and is known for its athletics programme. The school has participated in and won several provincial and national school athletics competitions.

== History ==
A. Rathnayake Central College, located in Walala, Kandy, has a history dating back to 1926, when it began during the British colonial period in a small thatched-roof hut. The school was later developed under the Central College concept introduced by C. W. W. Kannangara, with the support of Abeyratne Ratnayaka. On 24 January 1944, it was officially established as Walala A. Rathnayake Central College and came under state administration.

At the beginning, the school had two teachers, twelve students, and three buildings. The first principal of the school was Mr. Tennakoon Wimalananda, while Mr. G. V. Helpola was responsible for the administration of the school at the time. Over the years, the school’s infrastructure expanded steadily, and both the number of students and teachers increased.

In 1995, the college was designated as a Sports School, and it has since produced several notable athletes, including Tharushi Karunarathna and Dilshi Kumarasinghe. The school has continued to make significant contributions to both education and sports in Sri Lanka.

== Sports ==
Walala A. Rathnayake Central College is widely known for its sports programme, particularly in athletics. In 1995, the school was designated as the sports school for the Kandy District by the Ministry of Education.

The school has achieved significant success in provincial and national athletics competitions. At the Central Province Inter-Educational Zone Athletics Championship in 2018, Walala A. Rathnayake Central College won both the boys' and girls' overall championships, securing the boys' title for the 20th time and the girls' title for the 26th consecutive year.

The college has also recorded success at all-island level competitions. In 2016, the girls' team won the overall championship at the All-Island Schools Athletic Meet. In 2018, the school emerged as the girls' overall champions at the Sir John Tarbat Senior Schools Athletics Championship.

At the All-Island School Games Athletics Championship in 2022, the girls' team won the overall championship while the school finished runners-up in the mixed category.

The school has produced several national-level athletes, including Tharushi Karunarathna, who represented Sri Lanka at the 2024 Summer Olympics and won the women's 800 metres gold medal at the 2022 Asian Games.

The college also fields a cricket team and participates annually in the Battle of the Blue and Gold cricket encounter against Nugawela Central College.
