= K. J. Manoj Lal =

Indian Olympics athlete

K. J. Manoj Lal (born 16 May 1978) is an Indian Olympic athlete from Kerala. He was coached by Thankachan Mathew and represented India at the 2000 Summer Olympics in Sydney. He ran 400 metres in 46.01 seconds. This was bested later by Kerala's K. M. Binu who did it in 45.59 seconds. K. J. Manoj Lal also won silver medals at the 2000 Asian Athletics Championships and 2002 Asian Games for 4 × 400 metres relay.
