= Sylvina Pais =

Indian athlete

Personal information
- Nationality: Indian

Sport
- Country: India
- Sport: Athletics
Medal record
Women's athletics
Representing India
Asian Championships
Silver medal – second place	1993 Manila	4 × 400 m

Sylvina Cecil Pais is an Indian athlete. She won a silver medal in the 4 × 400 m relay in the 1993 Asian Athletics Championships. She was the National champion in 400 metres hurdles in 1992 and 1993.
