= Mei Kodama =

Japanese sprinter (born 1999)

Personal information
- Nationality: Japanese
- Born: 8 June 1999 (age 27) Usuka, Japan

Sport
- Country: Japan
- Sport: Track and field
- Event: Sprints

Achievements and titles
- Personal bests: 100 m: 11.24 (2022); 200 m: 23.41 (2022)
Medal record
Women's athletics
Representing Japan
Asian Junior Championships
Bronze medal – third place	2018 Gifu	100 m

Mei Kodama (兒玉 芽生, Kodama Mei; born 8 June 1999) is a Japanese athlete who specializes in sprints. She is the country's third fastest ever runner over 100 metres, behind Chisato Fukushima and Momoko Takahashi. She won 4 Japan Championships titles between 2019 and 2021, 2 for 100 metres and 2 for 200 metres.

She also represents Japan in many international relay events such as the 2019 and 2021 World Athletics Relays. She also competed in the women's 4 × 100 metres relay event at the 2020 Summer Olympics. She is a joint holder of the Japanese records in the 4×200 metres relay.
