= Suman Rawat =

Indian distance runner

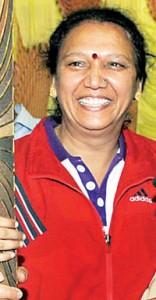
- Suman in 2002

Personal information
- Nationality: Indian
- Born: 6 March 1961 (age 65) Arthi Kapahi, Himachal Pradesh, India

Sport
- Sport: Track and field
- Event(s): 1500 metres 3000 metres 10000 metres
Medal record
Women's athletics
Representing India
Asian Games
Bronze medal – third place	1987 Seoul	3000 m
Asian Championships
Bronze medal – third place	1985 Jakarta	3000 m
South Asian Games
Gold medal – first place	1987 Calcutta	1500 m
Gold medal – first place	1987 Calcutta	3000 m

Suman Rawat (born 6 March 1961) is an Indian former track and field athlete. She competed in the 3000 metres event and won bronze at the 1986 Asian Games and gold in the 1987 South Asian Games in the 1500 m and 3000 m events. She was conferred with the Arjuna award for her achievements. She hails from India's Himachal Pradesh State.
