= Shantimol Philips =

Indian sprinter

Personal information
- Nationality: Indian

Sport
- Country: India
- Sport: Athletics
Medal record
Women's athletics
Representing India
Asian Games
Silver medal – second place	1990 Beijing	4×400 m

Shantimol Philips is an Indian athlete. She won a Silver medal in 4 × 400 m relay in the 1990 Asian Games.
