= Dilshi Kumarasinghe =

Sri Lankan track and field athlete (born 1999)

Personal information
- Full name: Kotambewaththe Gedara Dilshi Maheesha Shyamali Kumarasingha
- Born: 11 May 1999 (age 27) Digana, Kandy District, Central Province, Sri Lanka
- Education: Digana Rajawella Dharmasoka Junior School; A. Rathnayake Central College

Sport
- Sport: Athletics
- Event(s): 400 m, 800 m, 4 × 400 metres relay
- Coached by: Susantha Fernando
Medal record
Women's Athletics
Representing Sri Lanka
South Asian Games
Gold medal – first place	2019 Kathmandu	400 m
Gold medal – first place	2019 Kathmandu	800 m
Gold medal – first place	2019 Kathmandu	4 × 400 m relay
Asian Junior Athletics Championships
Silver medal – second place	2018 Gifu	400 m
Bronze medal – third place	2018 Gifu	800 m
Bronze medal – third place	2018 Gifu	4 × 400 m relay
South Asian Junior Athletic Championships
Gold medal – first place	2018 Colombo	400 m
Gold medal – first place	2018 Colombo	800 m
Gold medal – first place	2018 Colombo	4 × 400 m relay

Kotambewaththe Gedara Dilshi Maheesha Shyamali Kumarasingha (Sinhala: කෝතම්බෙවත්ත ගෙදර දිල්ෂි මහීෂා ශ්‍යාමාලි කුමාරසිංහ) also simply known as K. G. D. M. S. Kumarasinghe or Dilshi Kumarasinghe (Sinhala: දිල්ෂි කුමාරසිංහ) aka Shyamali Kumarasinghe (born 11 May 1999) is a Sri Lankan track and field athlete and a national record holder in women's 800m. She is currently coached by Susantha Fernando.

== Biography ==
Dilshi was born on 11 May 1999 in Digana, Kandy, Central Province as the only child in her family. Her father was a minor worker while her mother works in a garment factory. She pursued her primary education at the Digana Rajawella Dharmasoka Junior School. She then moved to Walala A. Rathnayake Central College in 2014 to pursue her secondary education after obtaining scholarship to study at A Rathnayake Central College with the assistance of her coach Susantha Fernando.

== Career ==
Dilshi competed in the 100m and 200m events during school competitions at the Rajawella Junior School. After joining the A. Rathnayake Central College in 2014, it was her athletic instructor Susantha Fernando who influenced her to specialise in the 400m and 800m events. She also later joined the Sri Lankan Army with the support of her coach in order to continue her career in Athletics.

She tasted her first international experience during the 2016 Asian Junior Athletics Championships which was held in Ho Chi Minh City, where she was placed 6th in the women's 800 meter finals. In June 2018, she participated at the 2018 Asian Junior Athletics Championships which was held in Gifu and claimed silver in the women's 400 meters event with a timing of 54.03 seconds and also claimed bronze medal in the women's 800 meters event with a timing of 2:04.53 seconds. In addition, she also secured bronze medal in the 4 x 400 meter relay event.

She also took part at the 2018 IAAF World U20 Championships in Tampere, Finland competing in the women's 800 meters where she finished at 37th position and also competed in the 4 x 400 meter relay event where Sri Lanka finished at 19th position. She also claimed gold medals in 400m, 800m and 400m relay events at the 2018 South Asian Junior Athletic Championships which was held in Colombo. In April 2019, Kumarasinghe was part of the Sri Lankan 4 x 400 meter relay, which finished fourth at the 2019 Asian Athletics Championships at the Khalifa Stadium in Doha. During the 23rd Asian Athletics Championships on the final day of the competition, she along with Nadeesha Ramanayaka, Nimali Liyanarachchi and Upamalika Ratnakumari set the new Sri Lankan national record for 4 x 400 meter relay with a record timing of 3: 35.06 seconds.

She made her maiden South Asian Games appearance representing Sri Lanka at the 2019 South Asian Games and became the most successful athlete for Sri Lanka during the competition, claiming three gold medals in athletic events (400m, 800m and 4×400m relay).

She emerged as winner of the National Athletics Championships in December 2020 in the women's 800m category. Her timing of 2:02.80 seconds after winning the 98th National Athletics Championships in the women's 800m final during December 2020 was also rated as the best time run by an Asian born athlete for the year 2020 as per the World Athletics statistics.

On 9 April 2021, she clinched the national title for women's 800m and broke the Sri Lankan national record for women's 800m by finishing with record timing of 2:02.52 seconds during the National Athletics Trial 2021 (national qualifiers) which was held at the Sugathadasa Stadium in Colombo. The 800m national record was previously held by Gayanthika Abeyrathne which was set during the 2017 National Athletics Trial. She won the national Selection Trial in 2021 in the women's 400m category.

== International competitions ==
Year	Competition	Venue	Position	Event	Notes
Representing Sri Lanka
2019	South Asian Games	Kathmandu, Nepal	1st	400 m	
2019	South Asian Games	Kathmandu, Nepal	1st	800 m	
2019	South Asian Games	Kathmandu, Nepal	1st	4×400 m relay	

== Personal bests ==
Outdoor

- 800 metres – 2:02.52 (Colombo 2021) NR

== See also ==
- List of South Asian Games gold medalists in athletics
- List of Sri Lankan sportspeople
