= Kuliyapitiya Central College =

Public school in Sri Lanka

Central College Kuliyapitiya
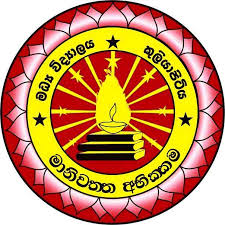
- Meegahakotuwa, Kuliyapitiya; Sri Lanka

Information
- School type: Public National school
- Motto: "Maniwatta Abhikhkhama" නොනැවතී ඉදිරියටම Keep moving forward
- Established: February 1947; 79 years ago
- Founder: C.W.W. Kannangara
- Staff: Around 200
- Grades: 6-13
- Gender: Mixed school
- Age: 11 to 19
- Enrolment: Over 2,000
- Language: Sinhala, Tamil, English
- Colours: maroon and yellow
- Song: "Sathkoralaye pahantharuwa"
- Affiliation: Ministry of Education
- Alumni: Old Centralists, Kcians
- Website: cck.lk

Central College Kuliyapitiya (මධ්‍ය විද්‍යාලයය කුලියාපිටිය ) is a national school for boys and girls in Sri Lanka, in the suburb of Kuliyapitiya. The school was founded in 1947.

== Early history ==
Following the central school concept of former Minister of Education C. W. W. Kannangara, under the patronage of the government, a bilingual mixed school was inaugurated in the Dandagamuwa electoral division on 3 February 1947. Central College Kuliyapitiya was the 54th and the last Central College. Mr. P. Senarath was appointed as the first principal of Central College Kuliyapitiya. The first session was attended by 149 students, 67 more the following day. There were 551 students on 17 February 1947. Under the patronage of the MP I. M. R. A. Iriyagolla, the father of the school, Central College was relocated to the new buildings at Meegahakotuwa on 7 July 1951, where Prime Minister D. S. Senanayeke declared the buildings open.

== Prefects' Guild ==
Head Prefect (boy) :- Joshua Mishel

Head Prefect (girl) :- Methusa Rathnamali Jayasinghe

Deputy Head Prefect (boy) :- Chalith Maduranga

Deputy Head Prefect (girl) :- Chandula Sithmini

Teacher in Charge :- Mr.Asith Sampath

== Houses ==
The students are divided among four houses.

                  Colour
•Gemunu        -  Red   

•Thissa        -  Green      

•Rajasinghe    -  Yellow 

•Parakrama    -  Blu.    

The houses are named after the four main ancient kings of Sri Lanka. An annual track and field tournament among these houses is held at the beginning of the first term.

== Old Students’ Association ==
Mr. Lional Lokuliyana, the then principal, conceived the idea of the Central College Old Students’ Association. In subsequent years the OSA and the School’s administration have co-operated in furthering the development of the college. The incumbent principal of the school has presided over the OSA. Other established associations include the Old Science Students’ Association and Old Cricketers’ Association.
