= Sanjay Kumar Rai =

Indian track and field athlete

Medal record

Men's athletics

Representing India

Asian Championships
Silver medal – second place	2000 Jakarta	Long jump

Sanjay Kumar Rai (born 1 May 1979) is an Indian track and field athlete from Uttar Pradesh, India who specializes in the long jump event. He competed at the 2000 Sydney Olympic Games but did not record a valid jump. His personal best jump in IAAF competition is 8.03 m at the 2000 Asian Athletics Championships in Jakarta in 2000, where he won the silver medal.

He has succeeded T. C. Yohannan of Kerala. Later Amritpal Singh (8.08 m) broke his record in the 10th Federation Cup Athletics Championships at the Nehru Stadium in New Delhi in 2004.
