= Vijay Pal Singh =

Indian pole vaulter

Personal information
- Full name: Vijay Pal Singh
- Nationality: Indian
- Born: 1 January 1967 (age 59) Haryana, India

Sport
- Country: India
- Sport: Track and field athletics
- Event: Pole vault

Achievements and titles
- Personal bests: outdoor: 5.10 m (1987, Indian record)
- Updated on 19 September 2009

Vijay Pal Singh (born 1 January 1967) is a former Indian pole vaulter from Haryana who became the first Indian pole vaulter to clear 5.00 meters. He holds the current national record of 5.10 metres set in Thiruvananthapuram in 1987. It was one of the longest surviving national records in Indian athletics, until it was bettered in 2018 by Subramani Siva

Vijay Pal was born in Haryana.
