= Sumitra Nayak =

Indian rugby player

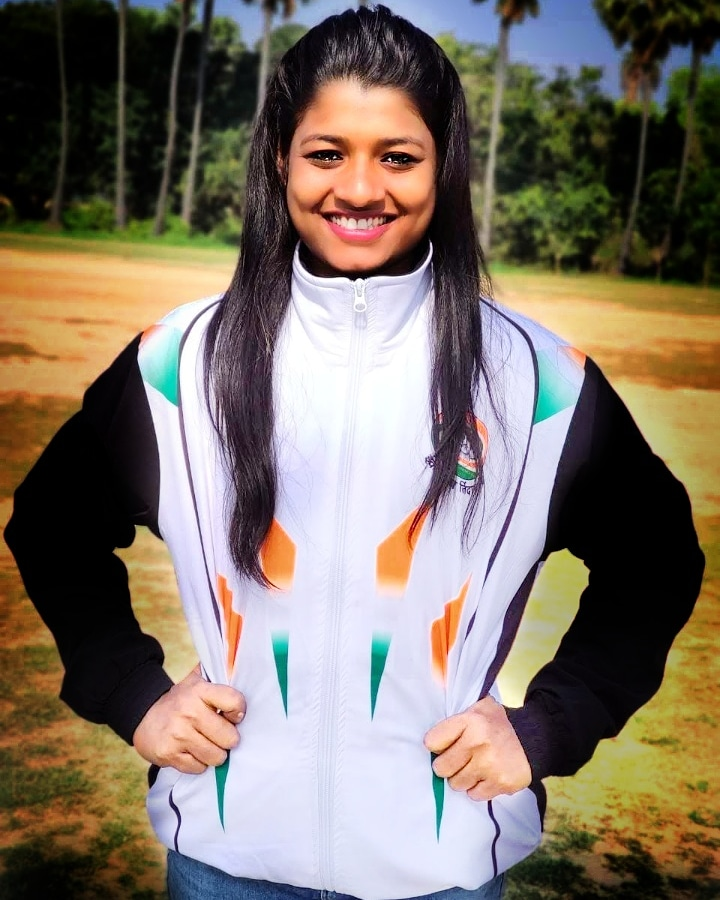

Personal information
- Full name: Sumitra Nayak
- Citizenship: Indian
- Born: 8 March 2000 (age 26) Duburi, Jajpur district, Odisha, India
- Education: Bachelor of Arts; KISS University
- Years active: 2007~

Sport
- Sport: Rugby
- Coached by: Rudhrakesh Jana, Nasser Hussain

Sumitra Nayak (born 8 March 2000) is a female rugby player from Jajpur, Odisha, India. She has won medals for India and played a crucial role in the country's bronze medal win in the 2019 Asian Women Championship by scoring a penalty kick in a closely-fought match against Singapore.

== Personal life and background ==
Nayak was born on 8 March 2000 in Duburi village of Odisha's Jajpur district. However, her mother was abused by her father decided to migrate to Bhubaneswar with her kids when they were very young. Nayak's father had once attempted to burn the family alive after confining them in their house. Her mother had to work in other people's houses to raise her children.

In Bhubaneswar, Nayak joined the Kalinga Institute of Social Sciences ( K.I.S.S ) that provides free education and sports training to tribal children. She is presently an undergraduate student at the institute. Nayak started playing rugby at KISS in 2008 although her mother was reluctant to let her play.

Nayak now teaches rugby to girls at KISS and in her village. She had also delivered a TEDTalk in Pune.

== Professional career ==
Nayak trained under coach Rudhrakesh Jena at KISS. Following her state-level debut in 2012, she participated in the under-13 Women's Rugby World Cup in 2014. She also participated in the National School Games and the National Championships. She was instrumental in India's bronze medal win at the 2016 Asian Girls Rugby Sevens (U-18) in Dubai. In 2018, she was appointed India's under-18 rugby team skipper.

In June 2019, she was important in India's first ever international victory in 15s. Nayak kicked a penalty in the game's last moments against Singapore, which helped India win the bronze medal at the Asia Rugby Women's Championship, apart from earning its first win in the 15s format.

Nayak was part of the Indian senior team that won the silver medal in the Asia Rugby Sevens Trophy in Jakarta in August 2019. She also led India's team at the Asia Rugby U-20 Women's Seven Series in Laos in the same month.

Odisha Chief Minister Naveen Patnaik had congratulated Nayak on her selection to the Indian team for the Asia Rugby Unstoppable meet.
