= Deena Ram =

Indian steeplechase runner

Medal record

Men's athletics

Representing India

Asian Championships
Gold medal – first place	1989 New Delhi	3000 m st.

Deena Ram (born 1964 in Rajasthan state) is a former Indian track and field athlete who specialised in the 3000 meters steeplechase. He won the gold medal at the 1989 Asian Athletics Championships and the silver medal at Asian Games. He was awarded Arjuna Award in 1990.

He also participated in the steeplechase at the 1991 World Championships. He was coached by Illyas Babar.
