= Nednapa Chommuak =

Thai sprinter

Personal information
- Nationality: Thai
- Born: 9 August 1971 (age 54)

Sport
- Sport: Sprinting
- Event: 200 metres
Medal record
Women's athletics
Representing Thailand
Asian Championships
Bronze medal – third place	1989 New Delhi	4×100 m

Nednapa Chommuak (born 9 August 1971) is a Thai sprinter. She competed in the women's 200 metres at the 1992 Summer Olympics.
