= Mahesh Perera =

Sri Lankan hurdler

Personal information
- Nationality: Sri Lankan
- Born: 2 January 1974 (age 52)

Sport
- Sport: Track and field
- Event: 110 metres hurdles

Mahesh Perera (born 2 January 1974) is a Sri Lankan hurdler. He competed in the men's 110 metres hurdles at the 1996 Summer Olympics.
