= Zenia Ayrton =

Indian athlete

Personal information
- Nationality: Indian
- Born: 16 March 1972 (age 54)

Sport
- Country: India
- Sport: Athletics
Medal record
Women's athletics
Representing India
Asian Games
Silver medal – second place	1990 Beijing	4×100 m relay

Zenia Ayrton (born 16 March 1972) is an Indian athlete. She won a silver medal in 4 × 100 m relay in the 1990 Asian Games.
