= Haider Ali Shah (athlete) =

Pakistani triple jumper (born 1963)

Personal information
- Nationality: Pakistani
- Born: 5 May 1963 (age 63)

Sport
- Sport: Athletics
- Event: Triple jump

Haider Ali Shah (born 5 May 1963) is a Pakistani athlete. He competed in the men's triple jump at the 1988 Summer Olympics.
