= K. M. Binu =

Indian athlete

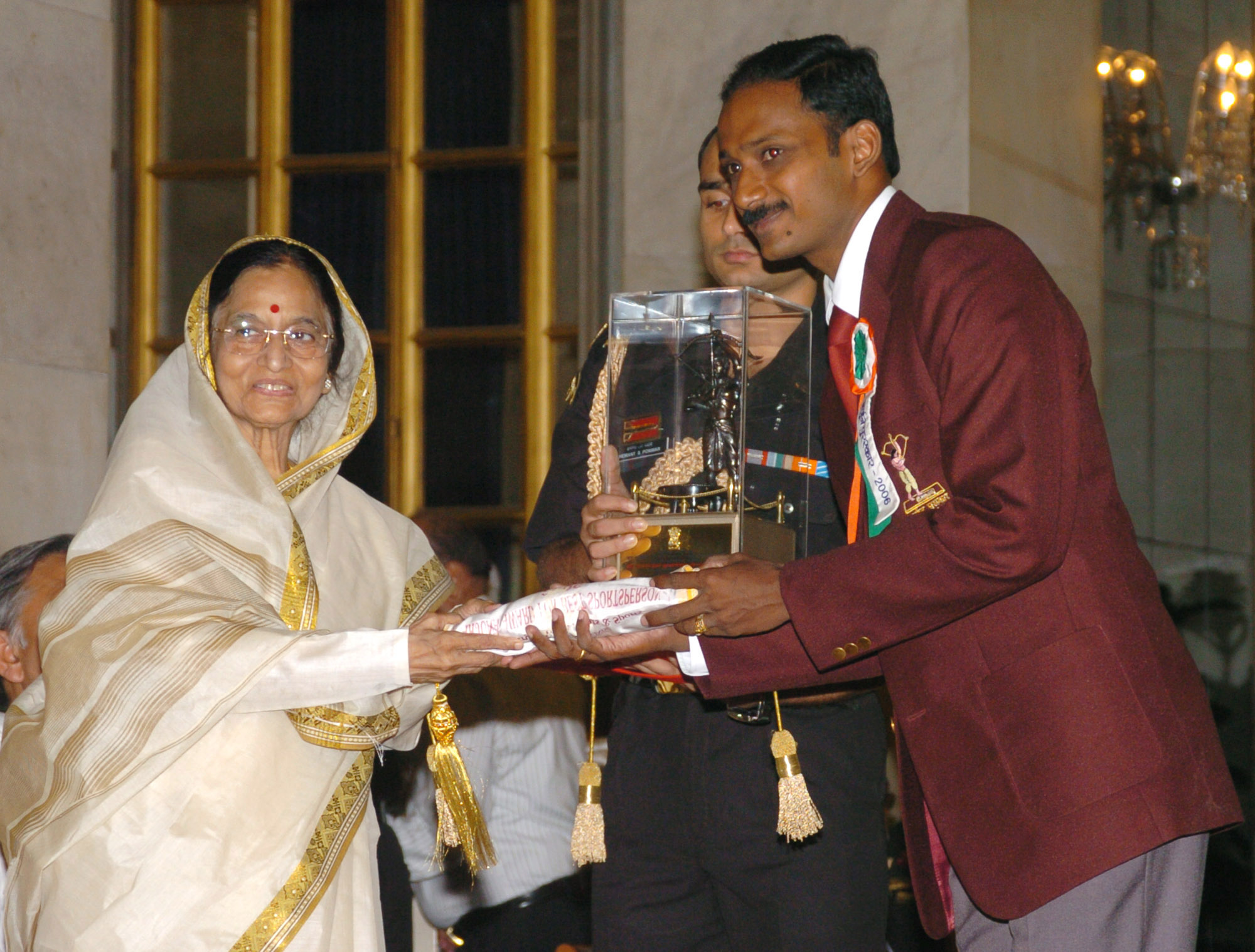
- K. M. Binu in 2006.

Personal information
- Full name: Kalayathumkuzhi Mathews Binu
- Nationality: India
- Born: November 6, 1978 (age 47) Idukki, Kerala, India
- Height: 1.78 m (5 ft 10 in)
- Weight: 67 kg (148 lb; 10.6 st)

Sport
- Country: India
- Sport: Running
- Events: 400 metres, 800 metres
- Club: Central Excise, Central GST and Customs
- Retired: yes

Kalayathumkuzhi Mathews Binu (born 20 December 1980) is an Indian track and field athlete from Kerala who specializes in 400 metres and 800 metres. He held the current 400 metres national record of 45.48 s set at the 2004 Athens Olympics on 20 August 2004 which was later broken by Mohammad Anas 45.32 sec in the Commonwealth games, Gold coast 2018 sec. He broke the 44-year-old Olympics mark (by an Indian) held by Milkha Singh who set an Indian National Record with a timing of 45.73 s at the 1960 Rome Olympics. He and his elder sister K. M. Beenamol made history when they became the first Indian siblings to win medals in a major international competition. They won medals at the Busan Asian Games (2002). While Binu won the men's 800 metres silver, his sister won the gold medal in the women's event. Binu received the Arjuna Award for the year 2006 for his achievements in Indian athletics.

== Biography ==
Hailing from the Idukki district of Kerala, Binu was born on 06 November 1978. Following in the footsteps of his sister Beenamol, he chooses athletics as his career. Binu was coached by Yuri from Ukraine who also coached Beenamol.
