= Jagdish Bishnoi =

Indian athlete

Personal information
- Full name: Jagdish Kumar Singh Bishnoi
- Born: Dhorimana, Barmer, Rajasthan

Sport
- Country: India

Jagdish Bishnoi (born 20 May 1972) is an Indian javelin thrower. He competed at the 2000 Summer Olympics in Sydney, in the men's javelin throw.
