= Hsu Pei-ching =

Taiwanese hurdler (born 1973)

Personal information
- Nationality: Taiwanese
- Born: 24 October 1973 (age 52)

Sport
- Sport: Track and field
- Event: 400 metres hurdles
Medal record
Women's athletics
Representing Chinese Taipei
Asian Games
Silver medal – second place	1994 Hiroshima	400 m hurdles
Silver medal – second place	1998 Bangkok	400 m hurdles
East Asian Games
Silver medal – second place	1993 Shanghai	400 m
Silver medal – second place	1997 Busan	400 m hurdles
Bronze medal – third place	1993 Shanghai	400 m hurdles
Asian Championships
Gold medal – first place	1995 Jakarta	400 m hurdles
Silver medal – second place	1993 Manila	4×100 m relay
Bronze medal – third place	1998 Fukuoka	400 m hurdles

Hsu Pei-ching (Chinese: 徐佩菁, born 24 October 1973) is a Taiwanese hurdler. She competed in the women's 400 metres hurdles at the 1996 Summer Olympics.
