= Reeth Abraham =

Indian athlete

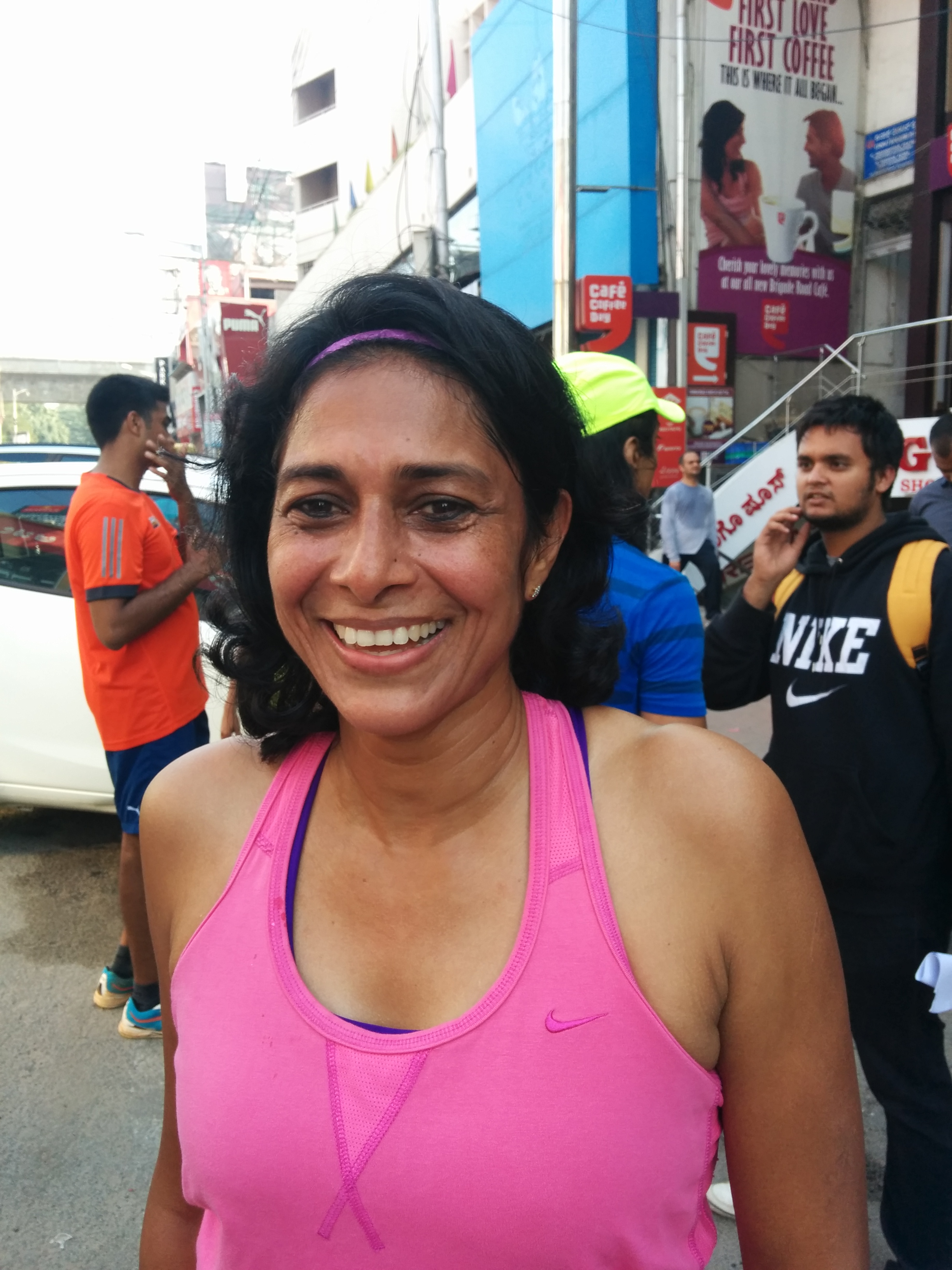
- Abraham in Bengaluru at a 10k run
- Born: 1961 or 1962 (age 63–64); Mysore
- Occupations: Track and field athlete
- Employer: Corporation Bank
- Known for: Arjuna Award & co-founding Clean Sports India.
- Spouse: Sunil Abraham
- Children: Shilka, Shamir

Reeth Abraham is an athlete from Bengaluru, India and former Asian medalist in long jump and 100 meters hurdles and the former national champion in heptathlon. She won the Arjuna Award in 1997 and the Rajyotsava Award in 1983. Reeth had a long athletic career spanning over 15 years (1976–1992). At the national level championships, she won 16 Gold and 11 Silver medals.

Reeth is an active athlete and competes regularly in the World Masters events and won medals. She is the current World and Asian Masters Champion in Triple Jump in her age category. She is the joint convenor of Clean Sports India. She is very active in promoting fitness among people and active lifestyles. She actively promotes various running events and Marathons in India. She has been the Brand Ambassador of Bengaluru's only Marathon - Shriram Properties Bengaluru Marathon since 2014. She is the Director of NEB Sports Entertainment Pvt. Ltd.

== Personal life ==
Reeth hails from Mysore and took to sport at the age of 12. She studied at Christ the King Convent, Mysore which encourage sports immensely. She was a kho kho, basketball and throw ball player in addition to athletics at the university or state level. She subsequently decided to focus on athletics. She studied at Maharani college in Bangalore. She has four sisters who too were prolific sportspersons and have represented their respective universities, state and country in various sports fields.

She has two children Shilka and Shamir.

== Career ==
Reeth Abraham
Medal record

Women's athletics

Asian Championships
Bronze medal – third place	1989 New Delhi	Long jump

South Asian Games
Gold medal – first place	1989 Islamabad	100 Metres Hurdles
Gold medal – first place	1989 Islamabad	Long Jump
Gold medal – first place	1991 Colombo	Long Jump

World Masters Athletics Championships
Gold medal – first place	2013 Porto Alegre	W50 Triple Jump
Silver medal – second place	2011 Sacramento	W45 Long Jump
Silver medal – second place	2011 Sacramento	W45 Triple Jump
Bronze medal – third place	2003 Carolina	W40 Long Jump
Bronze medal – third place	2013 Porto Alegre	W50 Long Jump

During the course of her long athletic career spanning over 15 years (1976–1992), Reeth represented Karnataka State and India on a number of occasions, setting records along the way. All her achievements were the result of her dedication, application and sense of discipline.

=== National events ===
At national level championships, Reeth in all won 16 Gold and 11 Silver medals. In the National games, she won the numerous medals in the heptathlon from 1983 to 1987 (except the year 1985). She took to 100 meters hurdles and long jump after 1988 and went on to excel in them too at the national level. She holds to her credit of being a national champion in three events namely heptathlon, 100 meters hurdles and long jump and achieving national records in the long jump and heptathlon.

Her best achievement was as a mother when she won a national championship within 10 months of giving birth.

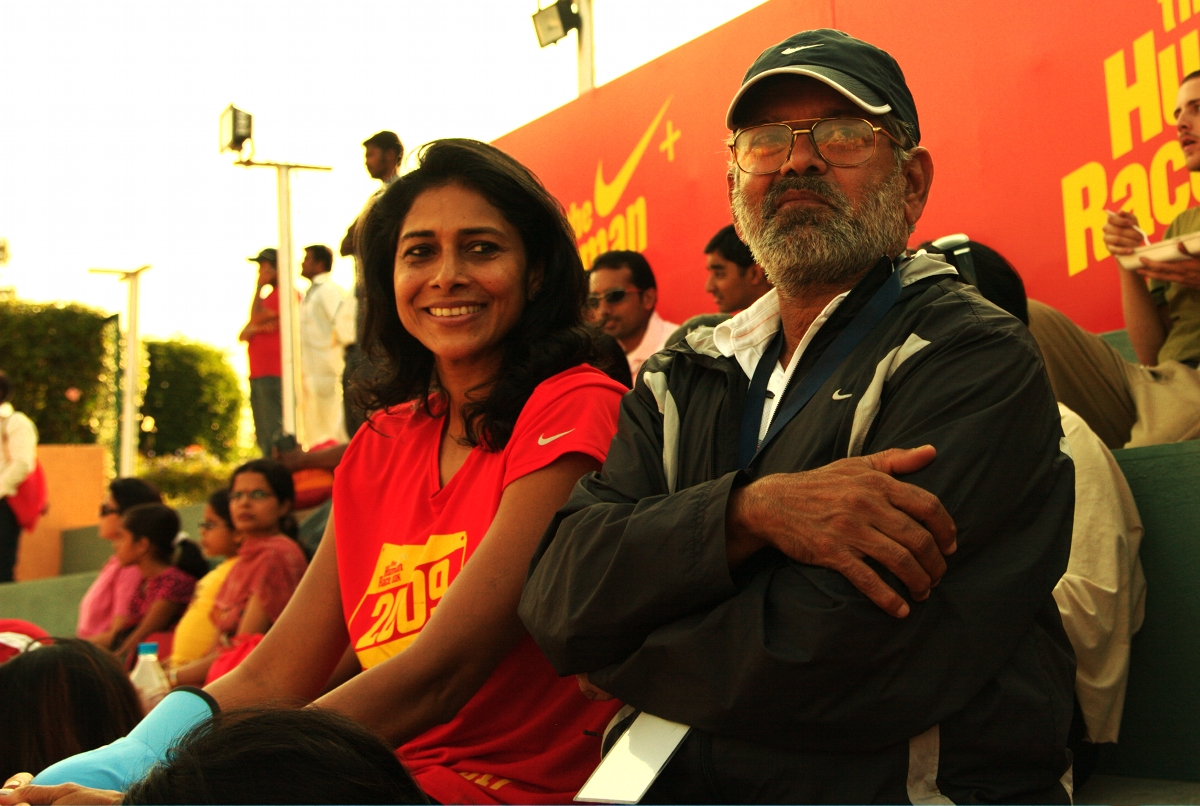
Reeth Abraham with her coach Beedu.

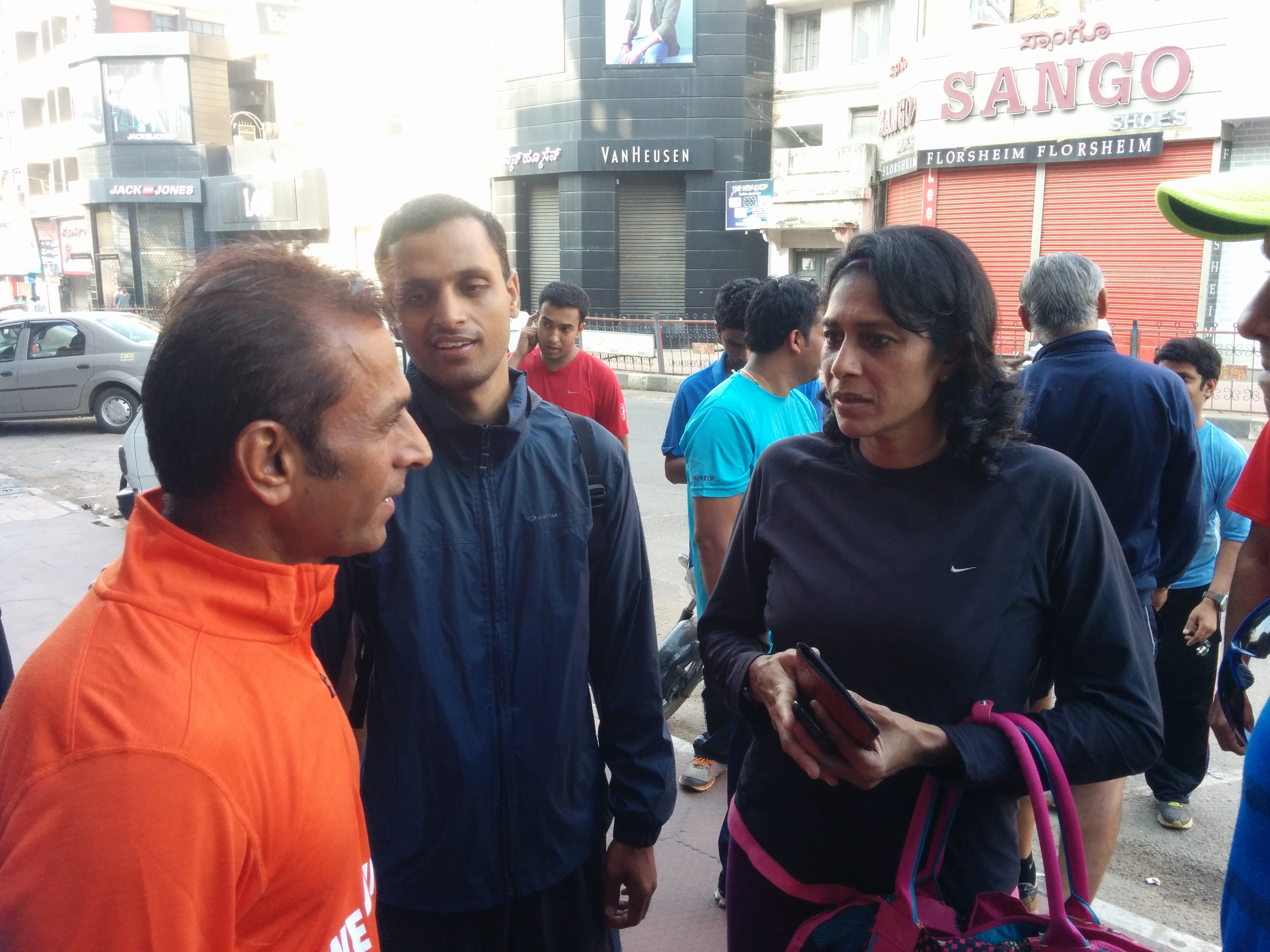
Reeth Abraham with Raj Vadgama in Bengaluru.

=== International events ===
At International level, she brought accolades to India by winning a number of international medals. She participated in two Asian Games, three Asian Track & Field Championships and two South Asian Games. In all, she won 3 Gold and 1 Silver at the South Asian Games in 1989 (Islamabad) and 1991 (Colombo) in long jump and 100 meter hurdles. She also held the South Asian games record in long jump.

She is also the first Indian mother to break a national record and the South Asian Games record. She also holds to her credit being the first Asian woman to win an Asian medal in an Individual event as a mother.

=== Masters events ===
Reeth is still an active athlete and competes regularly in the World Masters Athletics Championships meant for athletes over 35 years. She has participated and won medals in the World Masters events in 2003 (Carolina, Puerto Rico), 2011 (Sacramento, United States) and 2013 (Porto Alegre, Brazil) in various events.

In 2003, at Carolina, Puerto Rico she won the bronze medal in the Long Jump in the W40 category. In 2011, at Sacramento, Reeth won the silver medal for Long jump and the silver medal for Triple jump in the W45 category. In 2011, at Port Alegre, she won the bronze medal for Long jump in the W50 category.

=== Other activities ===
Reeth along with Sunil Abraham started the "SURE" athletic initiative in 1983. It was an organization to coach, support and promote budding athletes.

She is very active in promoting fitness among people and active lifestyles. She actively promotes various running events and Marathons in India.

Reeth is one of the coaches at the Nike Run Club in Bangalore. This is an initiative to encourage ordinary people to take up running.

== Awards and honours ==
"A lot of women, when I ask them if they exercise, still say that they don’t have time. That’s the most ridiculous excuse. Running makes one feel good about oneself, and the happiness of the woman is crucial to the well being of the family."

— Reeth Abraham in 2014, The New Indian Express
- 1983: Rajyotsava Award (Highest State Award)
- 1990: Dasara Award (State Award)
- 1997: Arjuna Award
- 1999: Indian Banks Association Award for outstanding Achievements
- 1999: Rotary Award for contribution to Athletics
- 1999: Lions Award for contribution to Athletics
- 2018:

== Clean Sports India ==
"If I have to be born again, I wish to be an athlete"

— Reeth Abraham in 2003, The Hindu

In June 2010, Reeth along with Ashwini Nachappa, Vandana Shanbagh, Sunita Godara, Vandana Rao and other accomplished athletes and sports enthusiasts co-founded Clean Sports India, an organization with the objective to encourage sportspersons to get into sports administration at national, state and local levels and also to rid sports from the menace of drugs.

She is currently the joint convenor of Clean Sports India.

== See also ==
- List of Indian women athletes
