= Bahadur Prasad =

Indian middle-distance runner

Personal information
- Full name: Bahadur Prasad
- Nickname: prasad ji
- Nationality: Indian
- Born: 1 September 1965 (age 60) Billauwa, Sidhwal, Mau, Uttar Pradesh, India
- Height: 1.77 m (5 ft 9 1/2 in)
- Weight: 72 kg (159 lb; 11.3 st)

Sport
- Country: India
- Sport: Track and field
- Events: 1500 m, 3000 m, 5000 m
- Club: Indian Railways

Achievements and titles
- Personal bests: 1500 m: 3:38.00 (1995); 5000 m: 13:29.70 (1992)
Medal record
Men's athletics
Representing India
Asian Championships
Gold medal – first place	1989 New Delhi	1500 m
Gold medal – first place	1993 Manila	5000 m
Silver medal – second place	1989 New Delhi	5000 m
Silver medal – second place	1993 Manila	1500 m

Bahadur Prasad Singh (born 1 September 1965) is a former Indian middle distance runner. He held the national record in 5000 metres. Singh set the 5000 m record (13:29.70) in Birmingham, England, on 27 July 1992, when finishing second behind Jack Buckner at the 1992 AAA Championships. Then on 23 December 1995, Prasad clocked a time of 3:38.00 at the 1995 South Asian Games in Chennai to set the 1500 m national record, which stood for 23 years.

Prasad represented India at the 1992 Barcelona Olympics in the 5000 m event where he clocked a time of 13:50.71 in the heats. He also took part in 1500 m at 1996 Atlanta Olympics. He managed an eight position in the fifth heats with an effort of 3:46.16 in the first round. He was awarded the Arjuna award for the year 1992 for his achievements in middle distance running.
