= Kutty Saramma =

Indian athlete

Personal information
- Nationality: Indian
- Born: Kalavati Saramma; 25 February 1971 (age 55)

Sport
- Country: India
- Sport: Track and field
- Event: 400 metres
Medal record
Women's athletics
Representing India
Asian Games
Silver medal – second place	1990 Beijing	4×100 m
Silver medal – second place	1990 Beijing	4×400 m
Silver medal – second place	1994 Hiroshima	4×400 m
Bronze medal – third place	1994 Hiroshima	400 metres
Asian Championships
Gold medal – first place	1989 New Delhi	4×400 m
Gold medal – first place	1991 Kuala Lumpur	4×400 m
Silver medal – second place	1989 New Delhi	4×100 m
Silver medal – second place	1993 Manila	4×400 m
Bronze medal – third place	1991 Kuala Lumpur	400 m
Bronze medal – third place	1993 Manila	400 m
Bronze medal – third place	1993 Manila	4×100 m

Kalavati 'Kutty' Saramma (born 25 February 1971) is an Indian former athlete who specialized in the 400 metres event. She was also a part of the Indian 4 × 100 metres relay and 4 × 400 metres relay teams. She is a winner of the G. V. Raja Award, which was awarded to her in 1991–92 and in 1993, she was awarded the Arjuna Award by the government of India.

== Career ==
Saramma won the silver medal in the 400 metres event at the 1988 Asian Junior Athletics Championships in Singapore clocking 55.40 seconds in the final. She bettered her timing at the next championships in 1990 in Beijing, clocking 55.07 seconds and winning the bronze in the process.

At the senior level, making her debut in the 1991 Asian Athletics Championships in Kuala Lumpur, Saramma won bronze with a timing of 53.51 seconds. At the 1993 Asian Championships in Manila, she won a bronze again, clocking 52.83 seconds in the final. She was also a part of the Indian 4 × 100 metres and 4 × 400 metres relay teams, that won medals at four consecutive Asian Championships, from 1989 to 1993. Presently working as Asst.Sports Officer, Southern Railway, Chennai
