= Razia Sheikh =

Indian javelin thrower

Personal information
- Nationality: Indian
- Born: 1958 or 1959 (age 66–67) Gujarat, India

Sport
- Country: India
- Sport: Track and field
- Event: Javelin throw
Medal record
Women's Javelin throw
Representing India
South Asian Games
Gold medal – first place	1987 Kolkata	Javelin throw

Razia Sheikh is an Indian former track and field athlete, who competed in javelin throw. She was the first Indian woman to cross the barrier of 50 metres, which she did at the 1987 South Asian Games. She represented India at two editions of the Asian Games (1982 Delhi and 1986 Seoul).

== Career ==
Sheikh broke the national record for a best throw by an Indian female javelin thrower when she broke Elizabeth Davenport's 21-year-old record in 1986 with a throw of 47.70 metres at the Playmakers' athletics meet in Delhi.

At the 1987 South Asian Games in Kolkata, Sheikh threw 50.38 metres setting a new Games and national record bettering her mark of 47.80 metres. She won gold at the event.
