= Molly Chacko =

Indian middle-distance runner

Medal record

Women's athletics

Representing India

Asian Championships
Silver medal – second place	1991 Kuala Lumpur	3000 m
Bronze medal – third place	1993 Manila	1500 m
Bronze medal – third place	1993 Manila	3000 m

Molly Chacko (born 15 May 1969) is an Indian middle distance runner from Kerala. She holds the current 3000 metres National record of 9:06.42 set on 10 October 1994 during the Hiroshima Asian Games. Molly is also a former National record holder in the 1500 metres. She set the 1500 m record in 1994 with a run of 4:12.01. This record was later broken by Sunita Rani in August 1999.

Molly is married to former Indian swimmer Sebastian Xavier and the couple is working with Southern Railways.
