= Athletics at the 1997 National Games of China =

Athletics at the 8th National Games of China
- Dates: 17–23 October 1997
- Host city: Shanghai, PR China
- Venue: Shanghai Stadium
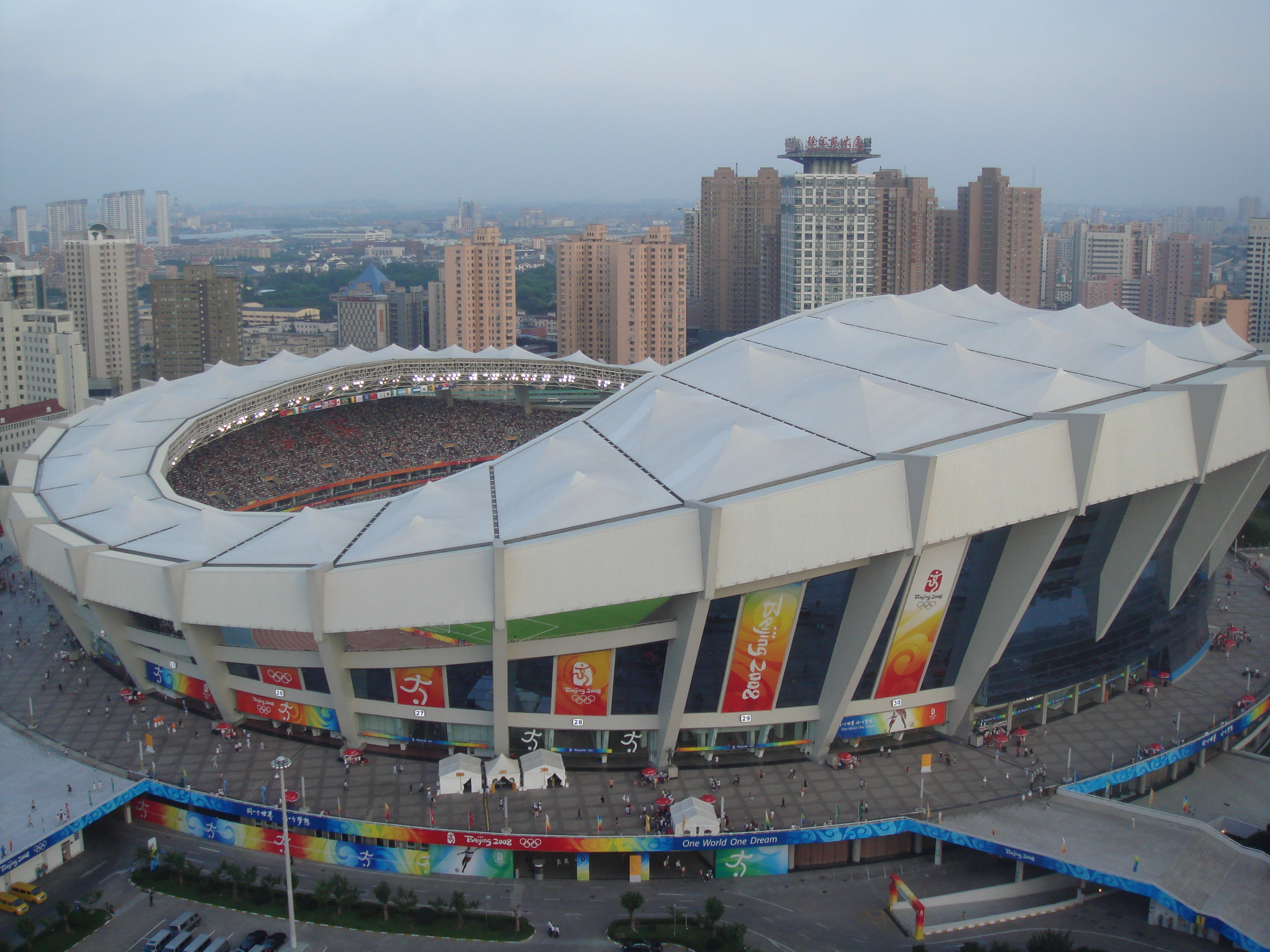

At the 1997 National Games of China, the athletics events were held in Shanghai in October 1997.

These Games were marred by numerous doping affairs.

Guangxi runners Chen Xuehui (the 800m silver medalist), Jiang Limei (the 400m hurdles champion) and Peng Yinghua (the 400m hurdles silver medalist) were later disqualified for doping. Sichuan long jumper Xiong Qiying, the long jump event winner, also tested positive.

== Medal summary ==
=== Men's events ===
Event	Gold		Silver		Bronze	
100 metres	Zhou Wei; Jiangxi	10.22	Chen Wenzhong; Guangxi	10.24	Wei Gong; Guangxi	10.27
200 metres	Zhou Wei; Jiangxi	20.55	Han Chaoming; Guangdong	20.64	Yin Hanzhao; Guangdong	20.65
400 metres	Han Chaoming; Guangdong	45.46 NR	Xu Zizhou; Guangdong	46.01 NYR	Hao Jianlin; Hebei	46.14
800 metres	Song Mingyou; Shandong	1:49.35	Bai Wentao; Heilongjiang	1:49.83	Zhang Yi; People's Liberation Army	1:50.1
1500 metres	Song Mingyou; Shandong	3:36.54	Gao Shuai; Liaoning	3:37.41	Song Weizeng; Liaoning	3:38.03
5000 metres	Xia Fengyuan; Shandong	13:25.14	Sun Ripeng; Liaoning	13:28.17	Cao Changhai; Shandong	13:45.20
10,000 metres	Xia Fengyuan; Shandong	28:17.71	Li Aiguo; Liaoning	28:18.66	Cao Changhai; Shandong	28:19.46
110 metres hurdles	Chen Yanhao; Shanghai	13.41	Li Tong; Beijing	13.64	Li Qiang; Sichuan	13.72
400 metres hurdles	Gao Yonghong; Shandong	49.34 NR	Du Yuechun; Anhui	49.58	Jiang Xuezhou; Fujian	50.04
3000 metre steeplechase	Sun Ripeng; Liaoning	8:10.46 NR	Li Changzhong; Guizhou	8:17.97	Sun Weili; Shandong	8:29.57
4 × 100 metres relay	Guangdong; Liang Keng; Leng Haodong; Yin Hanzhao; Han Chaoming	39.23	Guangxi	39.52	Shanghai	39.61
4 × 400 metres relay	Guangdong; Zheng Guanzhen; Lu Bing; Xu Zizhou; Han Chaoming	3:04.89	Hebei	3:05.70	Jiangsu	3:08.02
Marathon	Hu Gangjun; Inner Mongolia	2:09:18	Hao Lijun; Inner Mongolia	2:13:25	Meng Xianhui; Railways	2:13:25
20 km race walk	Li Zewen; Yunnan	1:20:46	Tan Mingjun; Shaanxi	1:21:24	Chen Shaoguo; Yunnan	1:23:23
50 km race walk	Zou Menghui; Shandong	3:48:12	Tan Mingjun; Shaanxi	3:50:36	Ma Hongye; Hebei	3:55:42
High jump	Niu Jian; Shanghai	2.28 m	Tao Rui; Shanghai	2.28 m	Bi Hongyong; Shandong	2.25 m
Pole vault	Xu Gang; Shandong	5.50 m	Zhang Hongwei; People's Liberation Army	5.30 m	Ge Yun; Shandong	5.30 m
Long jump	Huang Geng; Henan	8.05 m	Wen Yutao; Sichuan	8.04 m	Huang Le; People's Liberation Army	8.03 m
Triple jump	Lao Jianfeng; Guangdong	16.90 m	Duan Qifeng; Hebei	16.89 m	Zou Sixin; Hunan	16.68 m
Shot put	Wen Jili; People's Liberation Army	19.46 m	Liu Hao; Beijing	18.96 m	Li Wenkui; Beijing	18.75 m
Discus throw	Yu Wenge; Hunan	62.70 m	Li Shaojie; Shandong	62.52 m	Zhang Cunbiao; Hebei	61.14 m
Hammer throw	Bi Zhong; Jiangxi	71.26 m	Chong Changqing; Liaoning	71.24 m	Chen Zhichong; Sichuan	69.36 m
Javelin throw	Gao Wenxu; Shanxi	81.74 m	Miao Lianjing; Shandong	75.70 m	Li Rongxiang; Zhejiang	74.36 m
Decathlon	Du Xiaopeng; People's Liberation Army	7875 pts	Song Shulin; Liaoning	7797 pts	Guo Zhengrong; Sichuan	7593 pts

=== Women's events ===
Event	Gold		Silver		Bronze	
100 metres	Li Xuemei; Sichuan	10.79 AR	Liu Xiaomei; Sichuan	10.89	Tian Yumei; Guangxi	11.06
200 metres	Li Xuemei; Sichuan	22.01 AR	Liu Xiaomei; Sichuan	22.36	Du Xiujie; Guangdong	22.56
400 metres	Li Jing; Liaoning	50.01 WYR	Du Xiujie; Guangdong	50.87	Chen Yuxiang; Shandong	51.15
800 metres	Lang Yinglai; Liaoning	1:57.62	Lin Na; Liaoning	1:58.16	Zhang Jian; Beijing	1:58.98
1500 metres	Jiang Bo; Liaoning	3:50.98	Lang Yinglai; Liaoning	3:51.34 WJR	Yin Lili; Liaoning	3:53.91
5000 metres	Jiang Bo; Liaoning	14:28.09 WR	Dong Yanmei; Liaoning	14:29.82	Liu Shixiang; Shandong	14:38.14
10,000 metres	Dong Yanmei; Liaoning	30:38.09	Lan Lixin; Liaoning	30:39.41	Yin Lili; Liaoning	30:39.98
100 metres hurdles	Zeng Yan; Sichuan	12.74	Liu Jing; Sichuan	12.76	Zhang Yu; Tianjin	12.84
400 metres hurdles	Jiang Limei; Guangxi	53.38 AR †	Peng Yinghua; Guangxi	54.54 †	Li Rui; Hebei	54.93 WJR
4 × 100 metres relay	Sichuan; Xiao Lin; Li Yali; Liu Xiaomei; Li Xuemei	42.23 AR	Guangxi; Yan Jiankui; Tian Yumei; Huang Mei; Ou Yanlan	42.63	Hunan	43.41
4 × 400 metres relay	Jiangsu; Zhang Henghua; Cui Danfeng; Lü Xifang; Zhang Hengyun	3:26.88	Hebei	3:29.99	Sichuan; Liu Xiaomei; Tian Xiaoxia; Li Xuemei; Li Cong	3:30.17
Marathon	Pan Jinhong; Inner Mongolia	2:26:39	Wang Jianfen; Yunnan	2:26:58	Ai Dongmei; Railways	2:27:30
10 km race walk	Fan Xiaoling; People's Liberation Army	43:47	Sun Chunfang; Shanghai	43:50	Feng Haixia; People's Liberation Army	43:58
High jump	Jin Ling; Liaoning	1.96 m	Wang Wei; Shandong	1.94 m	Zhang Liwen; Tianjin	1.90 m
Pole vault	Cai Weiyan; Anhui	4.25 m	Sun Caiyun; Guangdong	4.20 m	Peng Xiaoming; Guangdong	4.15 m
Long jump	Xiong Qiying; Sichuan	7.01 m †	Guan Yingnan; Jiangsu	6.86 m	Zhong Mei; Sichuan	6.76 m
Triple jump	Huang Qiuyan; Guangxi	14.57 m WYR	Ren Ruiping; Shandong	14.49 m	Li Jiahui; Guangdong	14.13 m
Shot put	Sui Xinmei; Shanghai	20.25 m	Huang Zhihong; Zhejiang	20.24 m	Li Meisu; Hebei	19.46 m
Discus throw	Xiao Yanling; Hebei	70.00 m	Li Qiumei; Shanxi	66.48 m	Cheng Xianhong; Shanxi	66.00 m
Javelin throw	Wei Jianhua; Shanxi	66.64 m	Wang Yaning; Shanxi	64.52 m	Li Lei; Beijing	64.28 m
Heptathlon	Ma Miaolan; Zhejiang	6236 pts	Shen Shengfei; Zhejiang	6185 pts WYR	Liu Xin; Sichuan	6184 pts

== Results ==
=== Women ===
==== 100 m ====
The 100m was held from 17 to 18 October. After having clocking 10.90 seconds in the heats (setting a new area record in the process), Sichuan's Li Xuemei easily won her semi-final before smashing her record in a high-level final with a time of 10.79 seconds. Her teammate Liu Xiaomei, who had won the event four years before, took the silver medal in a personal best time of 10.89 seconds. Guangxi two-time Olympian veteran Tian Yumei finished third with a time of 11.06 seconds; equaling her personal best she had set in the semi-finals.

Nineteen-year-old Xiao Lin from Sichuan broke the Asian junior record three times. She came to Shanghai with a personal best of 11.29 seconds set in Chengdu that year and improved it to 11.22 in the heats, then to 11.20 in the semi-finals and finally to 11.17 in the final.

Semi-finals

First 4 of each heat (Q) qualified for the final.

Rank	Name	Team	Time	Notes
1	Li Xuemei	Sichuan	11.03	Q
2	Liu Xiaomei	Sichuan	11.03	SB, Q
3	Tian Yumei	Guangxi	11.06	PB, Q
4	Pei Fang	Shanghai	11.09	PB, Q
5	Li Yali	Sichuan	11.13	PB, Q
6	Liang Yi	Jiangsu	11.16	PB, Q
7	Cui Danfeng	Jiangsu	11.20	PB, Q
7	Xiao Lin	Sichuan	11.20	AJR, Q
9	Xiang Chirong	Shandong	11.25	PB
10	Hu Zhenxia		11.29	PB
11	Zhang Chunying		11.36	PB
	Huang Mei	Guangxi	11.50	
	Xiong Xiaoying		11.37	
	Yue Ling		11.33	
	Zeng Xiujun	Sichuan	11.57	

Final

Rank	Name	Team	Time	Notes
1st place, gold medalist(s)	Li Xuemei	Sichuan	10.79	AR, GR
2nd place, silver medalist(s)	Liu Xiaomei	Sichuan	10.89	PB
3rd place, bronze medalist(s)	Tian Yumei	Guangxi	11.06	=PB
4	Pei Fang	Shanghai	11.10	
5	Li Yali	Sichuan	11.15	
6	Xiao Lin	Sichuan	11.17	AJR
7	Liang Yi	Jiangsu	11.20	
8	Cui Danfeng	Jiangsu	11.43	

==== 200 m ====
The 200m was held from 21–22 October. Chen Yuxiang from Shandong set a new Asian junior record of 22.83 seconds in the heats and advanced to the semi-finals.

Semi-finals

First 4 of each heat (Q) qualified for the final.

Rank	Name	Team	Time	Notes
1	Li Xuemei	Sichuan	22.62	Q
2	Liu Xiaomei	Sichuan	22.64	PB, Q
3	Du Xiujie	Guangdong	22.76	SB, Q
4	Li Yali	Sichuan	22.80	PB, Q
5	Chen Yuxiang	Shandong	?	Q
6	Xiang Chirong	Shandong	22.92	PB, Q
7	Xiong Xiaoying		22.94	PB, Q
8	Liang Yi	Jiangsu	?	Q
9	Yue Ling		23.20	PB
10	Guo Lijuan		23.48	PB
11	Gao Chunxia		23.57	PB
	Ma Lixia		?	
	Qi Hong		?	
	Yan Jiankui	Guangxi	?	
	Hu Zhenxia		?	

Final

Rank	Name	Team	Time	Notes
1st place, gold medalist(s)	Li Xuemei	Sichuan	22.01	AR, GR
2nd place, silver medalist(s)	Liu Xiaomei	Sichuan	22.36	PB
3rd place, bronze medalist(s)	Du Xiujie	Guangdong	22.56	SB
4	Li Yali	Sichuan	22.87	
5	Liang Yi	Jiangsu	22.94	PB
6	Xiong Xiaoying		?	
7	Xiang Chirong	Shandong	?	
8	Chen Yuxiang	Shandong	?	

==== 400 m ====
The 400m was held from 17–18 October.

The final was won by Liaoning 17-year-old Li Jing in an astonishing time of 50.01 seconds. She beat Grit Breuer's world youth record of 50.48 seconds set in 1989 in the process.

Guangdong Du Xiujie and Shandong Chen Yuxiang finished respectively second and third. Zhang Hengyun, from Jiangsu, who had finished second in the event four years before; crossed the line in fourth place, recording despite all a new personal best.

Heats

Rank	Name	Team	Time	Notes
1	Li Jing	Liaoning	50.76	AJR, AYR, Q
2	Zhang Hengyun	Jiangsu	51.79	SB, Q
3	Chen Yuxiang	Shandong	51.84	Q
4	Zhang Ying		52.13	PB, Q
?	Bu Fanfang	Shandong	?	Q
?	Cao Chunying	Hebei	?	Q
?	Du Xiujie	Guangdong	?	Q
?	Lü Xifang	Jiangsu	?	Q
9	Li Cong	Sichuan	52.41	
10	Zhu Huangchao		52.85	PB
11	Jiang Lanying		53.38	PB
12	Wang Xuemei		53.39	PB

Final

Rank	Name	Team	Time	Notes
1st place, gold medalist(s)	Li Jing	Liaoning	50.01	WYR, AJR
2nd place, silver medalist(s)	Du Xiujie	Guangdong	50.87	SB
3rd place, bronze medalist(s)	Chen Yuxiang	Shandong	51.15	PB
4	Zhang Hengyun	Jiangsu	51.22	PB
5	Bu Fanfang	Shandong	51.85	PB
6	Lü Xifang	Jiangsu	51.99	
7	Cao Chunying	Hebei	52.21	SB
8	Zhang Ying		53.23	

==== 800 m ====
The 800m was held from 21–22 October.

Heats

First 2 of each heat (Q) and the next 2 fastest (q) qualified for the final.

Rank	Name	Team	Time	Notes
Dq	Chen Xuehui	Guangxi	~~1:57.92~~	Q, PB
1	Lin Na	Liaoning	1:58.26	PB, Q
2	Liu Jing	Jiangsu	1:58.55	Q, PB
3	Lang Yinglai	Liaoning	1:58.57	Q, PB
4	Liu Haiyan	Guangdong	1:58.57	q, PB
5	Wang Qingfen	Henan	1:58.69	q, PB
6	Liu Qifang	Guangxi	1:59.01	PB
7	Qu Yunxia	Liaoning	1:59.25	SB
8	Yan Wei	Henan	1:59.81	Q, PB
9	Zhang Jian	Beijing	1:59.91	Q, PB
10	Wang Yuanping	Heilongjiang	2:00.76	
11	Zhang Jinqing	Henan	2:01.17	PB
12	Zhang Xiaolan	Hebei	2:01.68	PB
13	Zhang Meng	Liaoning	2:01.73	PB
14	Liu Liping	Hebei	2:02.95	PB
15	Cui Yuying	Liaoning	2:03.01	PB
16	Zeng Yuying	Guangdong	?	
17	Mi Yuzhen	Hunan	2:03.60	PB
18	Yu Junping	Shanxi	2:03.63	PB
19	Yan Junli	Henan	2:04.19	PB
20	Tian Xiaoxia	Sichuan	?	

Final

Rank	Name	Team	Time	Notes
1st place, gold medalist(s)	Lang Yinglai	Liaoning	1:57.62	PB
2nd place, silver medalist(s)	Lin Na	Liaoning	1:58.16	PB
3rd place, bronze medalist(s)	Zhang Jian	Beijing	1:58.98	PB
4	Liu Jing	Jiangsu	1:59.15	
5	Wang Qingfen	Henan	1:59.29	
6	Yan Wei	Henan	1:59.66	PB
7	Liu Haiyan	Guangdong	2:00.99	
DQ	Chen Xuehui	Guangxi	~~1:57.82~~	

==== 1500 m ====
The 1500m was held from 17–18 October. It primarily consisted of Liaoning runners.

Qu Yunxia was expected to break the 3:50 bar according to her coach, Ma Junren. However, she fell during the final and only finished eighth. Her 20-year-old teammate Jiang Bo eventually won the race, clocking 3:50.98, the second fastest time ever. It remains one of three times under 3:51. Less than a half second behind her, barely 18 year old Lang Yinglai set the still standing World Junior Record, breaking the previous record by Lan Lixin set in the qualifying round. In fifth place, 16 year old Zhang Ling set the still standing World Youth Best. At the conclusion of this race, the top six all were in the top 12 in history (plus Qu in eight place still the world record holder). Since this race, only Genzebe Dibaba has run faster than any of them.

Heats

First 5 of each heat (Q) and the next 4 fastest (q) qualified for the final.

Rank	Name	Team	Time	Notes
1	Lan Lixin	Liaoning	3:55.01	WJR, Q
2	Qu Yunxia	Liaoning	3:55.38	SB, Q
3	Zhang Ling	Beijing	3:55.47	WYR, Q
4	Dong Yanmei	Liaoning	3:55.82	PB, Q
5	Liu Dong	Liaoning	3:56.31	PB
6	Liu Jing	Jiangsu	3:57.02	PB, q
7	Lang Yinglai	Liaoning	3:57.15	PB, Q
8	Jiang Bo	Liaoning	3:57.20	PB, Q
9	Yin Lili	Liaoning	3:58.22	PB, Q
10	Yan Wei	Henan	3:58.74	PB, Q
11	Wang Qingfen	Henan	3:58.97	PB, q
12	Wang Chunmei	Henan	3:59.48	PB, Q
13	Wang Ai	Liaoning	4:00.34	PB
14	Wang Xiaoxia		4:03.67	PB
15	Zhang Jinqing		4:04.05	PB
16	Liu Haiyan	Guangdong	4:04.49	PB
17	Cui Yuying		4:08.29	PB
18	Tao Sumei		4:08.52	PB
19	Tang Xueqing		4:13.17	PB
20	Liu Jianying		4.13.99	PB
?	Wang Renmei		?	

Final

Rank	Name	Team	Time	Notes
1st place, gold medalist(s)	Jiang Bo	Liaoning	3:50.98	WL
2nd place, silver medalist(s)	Lang Yinglai	Liaoning	3:51.34	WJR
3rd place, bronze medalist(s)	Yin Lili	Liaoning	3:53.91	PB
4	Lan Lixin	Liaoning	3:53.97	PB
5	Zhang Ling	Beijing	3:54.52	WYR
6	Dong Yanmei	Liaoning	3:55.07	PB
7	Liu Jing	Jiangsu	3:57.77	
8	Qu Yunxia	Liaoning	3:57.83	
9	Liu Dong	Liaoning	3:58.18	
10	Wang Qingfen	Henan	4:02.22	
11	Yan Wei	Henan	4:04.27	
	Wang Chunmei	Henan	?	

==== 10,000 m ====
The 10000m was held on 19 October.

Final

Rank	Name	Team	Time	Notes
1st place, gold medalist(s)	Dong Yanmei	Liaoning	30:38.09	PB, WL
2nd place, silver medalist(s)	Lan Lixin	Liaoning	30:39.41	WJR
3rd place, bronze medalist(s)	Yin Lili	Liaoning	30:39.98	PB
4	Dong Zhaoxia	Shanghai	30:47.22	
5	Wang Dongmei	Henan	30:47.72	
6	Liu Shixiang	Shandong	30:55.83	
7	Song Liqing	Liaoning	31:11.26	WYB
8	Wang Mingxia	Shandong	31:12.58	
9	Yang Siju	Yunnan	31:16.39	
10	Wang Yanfang	Liaoning	31:59.93	
11	Wang Xiaoxia	Liaoning	32:15.22	
12	Cui Guomei	Shandong	32:46.67	
13	Liang Ying	Yunnan	33:06.19	
14	Wang Xiujie	Army	33:17.98	
15	Cui Yuying	Liaoning	33:26.32	
16	Li Dong	Henan	33:27.79	
17	Tong Dejing	Jilin	33:36.95	
18	Lu Jing	Railway	33:41.22	
19	Li Wei	Shandong	?	

==== 100 m hurdles ====
The 100m hurdles were held from 17–18 October.

Heats

Rank	Name	Team	Time	Notes
1	Liu Jing	Sichuan	12.85	Q
2	Zhou Jing	Hebei	12.87	PB, Q
3	Zhang Yu	Tianjin	13.01	SB, Q
4	Luo Bin	Hunan	13.03	PB, Q
5	Zeng Yan	Sichuan	13.06	Q
6	Tan Yali		13.12	PB, Q
7	Tang Xiaoyue		13.13	PB, Q
?	Sun Hongwei	Hebei	?	Q
9	Liu Hao		13.33	PB
10	Jiang Jianchun		13.36	PB
11	Xiong Yanling		13.50	PB
?	Deng Xiaocen		?	
?	Zhou Hongyan		?	
?	Zhu Shuiying		?	

Final

Rank	Name	Team	Time	Notes
1st place, gold medalist(s)	Zeng Yan	Sichuan	12.74	PB
2nd place, silver medalist(s)	Liu Jing	Sichuan	12.76	PB
3rd place, bronze medalist(s)	Zhang Yu	Tianjin	12.84	SB
4	Luo Bin	Hunan	12.88	PB
5	Zhou Jing	Hebei	12.89	
6	Sun Hongwei	Hebei	12.92	AJR
7	Tan Yali		?	
8	Tang Xiaoyue		?	

==== 400 m hurdles ====
The 400m hurdles were held from 21–22 October.

Jiang Limei and Peng Yinghua, both from Guangxi had respectively won the gold and the silver medals but were later disqualified after failing a doping test.

Heats

First 2 of each heat (Q) and the next 2 fastest (q) qualified for the final.

Rank	Name	Team	Time	Notes
1	Li Rui	Hebei	55.32	SB, Q
2	Li Shuju	Hebei	55.43	PB, Q
3	Peng Qun	Jiangsu	55.46	PB, Q
4	Song Yinglan	Hunan	55.58	PB, Q
5	Li Yulian	Guangdong	55.72	PB, q
6	Sun Hongwei	Hebei	55.80	PB, q
7	Zhang Yu		56.19	PB
8	Rong Guiping	Guangxi	56.49	PB
8	Wang Qi		59.43	PB
	Huang Xia		?	
DQ	Jiang Limei	Guangxi	~~54.87~~	Q
DQ	Peng Yinghua	Guangxi	~~55.50~~	Q

==== 4 × 400 m relay ====
The 4 × 400 m relay was held on 23 October.

Final

Rank	Team	Name	Time	Notes
1st place, gold medalist(s)	Jiangsu, China	Zhang Henghua, Cui Danfeng, Lü Xifang, Zhang Hengyun	3:26.88	PB
2nd place, silver medalist(s)	Hebei, China		3:29.99	SB
3rd place, bronze medalist(s)	Sichuan, China	Liu Xiaomei, Tian Xiaoxia, Li Xuemei, Li Cong	3:30.17	
4				
5				
6				
7				
DQ	Guangxi, China	Peng Yinghua, Chen Xuehui, Rong Guiping, Jiang Limei	~~3:26.37~~	*

- The Guangxi team was later disqualified after the hurdlers Peng Yinghua, Jiang Limei and the 800 m runner Chen Xuehui failed a doping test. Jiangsu was awarded the gold medal and Sichuan, which originally finished fourth took the bronze medal.

==== Heptathlon ====
The heptathlon was held on 17–18 October. After a three years break, Zhejiang Chinese record holder Ma Miaolan won her second consecutive National Games title, winning the event with a total of 6236 points. Her 16-year-old teammate Shen Shengfei set a new world youth record to finish second, beating Sichuan's Liu Xin by just one point.

Rank	Name	Team	Time	Notes
1	Ma Miaolan	Zhejiang	6236 pts	SB
2	Shen Shengfei	Zhejiang	6185 pts	WYR
3	Liu Xin	Sichuan	6184 pts	PB
4	Liu Bo		?	
5	Ding Ying		?	
6	Zhang Xiaohui		5739 pts	PB
7	Wang Hailan		?	
8	?		?	
9	Wang Sili		5652 pts	PB
10	Wang Qiu		5652 pts	PB
11	Zou Ying		5640 pts	PB
