= Athletics at the National Games of China =

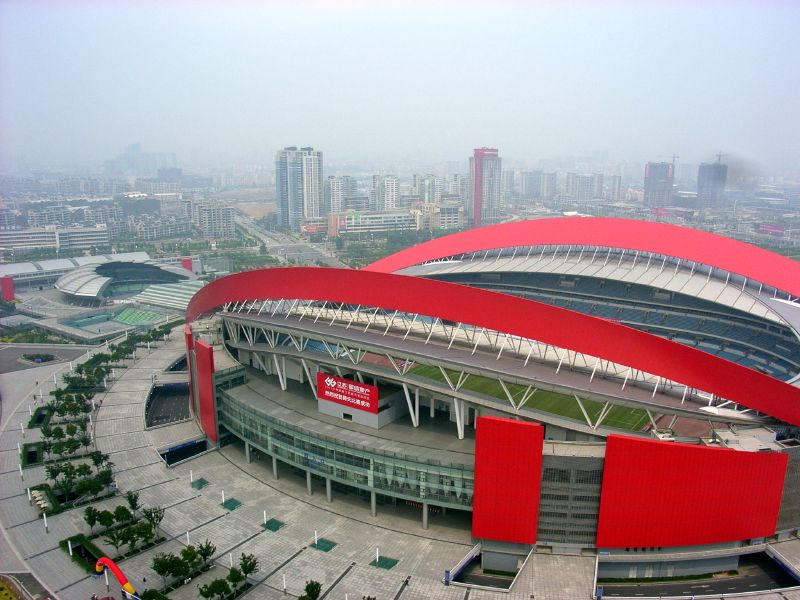
The Nanjing Olympic Sports Center, which hosted the athletics for the 2005 National Games

Athletics is one of the sports at the quadrennial National Games of China. Athletics competitions have been at every edition of the competition since its formation in 1910 as the Chinese National Games. The Games is the highest level athletics event for Chinese athletes, ahead of the annual Chinese Athletics Championships.

== Records in 1993 and 1997 ==
The competition has had an impact beyond national level through its record-breaking history, in particular by middle- and long-distance athletes coached by Ma Junren. Known as "Ma's Army", he exercised strict control over his group of specially-selected rural peasant girls and applied tonics of turtle's blood and caterpillar fungus (ophiocordyceps sinensis). At the 1993 National Games three world records were broken by his athletes: Qu Yunxia ran 3:50.46 minutes for the 1500 metres while Wang Junxia ran 8:06.11 minutes for the 3000 metres and 29:31.78 minutes for the 10,000 metres. All three records greatly exceeded the previous marks and all stood for over twenty years. Qu's mark was finally beaten by Genzebe Dibaba in 2015 and Wang's 10,000 m time was beaten by Almaz Ayana in 2016.

The 1993 Games also brought a slew of Asian records by women runners: 49.81 seconds for the 400 metres (Ma Yuqin), 1:55.54 minutes for the 800 metres (Liu Dong), 53.96 seconds for the 400 metres hurdles (Han Qing), and 3:24.28 minutes for the 4×400 m relay. Chinese national records were also broken by Zhang Yu (12.64 seconds for the 100 metres hurdles and Ma Miaolan (6750 pts for the heptathlon).

The performances in 1993 were seen as part of an exhibition of Chinese sporting prowess in light of Beijing's bid for the 2000 Summer Olympics, which was to be accepted or rejected by the International Olympic Committee just days after the closure of the national games.

The 1997 National Games brought further track and field records for Chinese women. Dong Yanmei knocked five seconds off the 5000 metres world record in qualifying, only for Jiang Bo to take a further three seconds off that time to win the final. Li Xuemei ran Asian bests of 10.79 seconds for the 100 metres and 22.01 seconds for the 200 metres. Sichuan's 4×100 m relay (featuring Li) ran another Asian record of 42.23 seconds. Xia Fengyuan and Sun Ripeng both set long-standing Chinese records in the 5000 m and the 3000 metres steeplechase that year.

The depth of women's distance track performances in 1993 and 1997 is easily visible in the all-time lists which includes seven of the top ten times ever in the 1500 m, and eight of the top ten times in the 3000 m. Wang Junxia's 10,000 m record remained twenty seconds faster than any other woman, until it was beaten in 2016. It remains the second fastest time ever.

Performances by Ma's athletes have left a tainted athletic legacy – although his women athletes broke new ground in distance running they were accompanied by accusations of doping, as none reached the same standard in events with anti-doping measures or international observers. Ma's career came to an end in 2000 when six of the seven athletes he was training for the 2000 Summer Olympics were banned after testing positive for erythropoietin (a blood-boosting agent). The International Association of Athletics Federations inducted world record holder Wang Junxia into its Hall of Fame in 2012, drawing condemnation from parts of the press internationally.

== Editions ==
| Year | Edition | Date | Host city | Athletics events |
Chinese National Games
| 1910 | I | | Nanjing | |
| 1914 | II | | Beijing | |
| 1924 | III | | Wuchang | |
| 1930 | IV | | Hangzhou | |
| 1933 | V | | Nanjing | |
| 1935 | VI | | Shanghai | |
| 1948 | VII | | Shanghai | |
National Games of the People's Republic of China
| 1959 | I | | Beijing | |
| 1965 | II | | Beijing | |
| 1975 | III | | Beijing | |
| 1979 | IV | | Beijing | |
| 1983 | V | | Shanghai | |
| 1987 | VI | | Guangzhou | |
| 1993 | VII | | Beijing/Sichuan/Qinhuangdao | |
| 1997 | VIII | October | Shanghai | |
| 2001 | IX | 17–23 November | Guangzhou | 46 |
| 2005 | X | 17–22 October | Jiangsu | 46 |
| 2009 | XI | 21–26 October | Shandong | 46 |
| 2013 | XII | 7–11 September | Shenyang | 46 |
| 2017 | XIII | 2–7 September | Tianjin | 46 |

== See also ==
- List of Chinese records in athletics
