= List of Chinese records in athletics =

The following are the national records in athletics in China maintained by Chinese Athletics Association (CAA).

== Outdoor ==
Key to tables: Awaiting ratification Record not kept by CAA Not ratified or later rescinded by CAA

! = timing by photo-electric cell

=== Men ===
Event	Record	Athlete	Date	Meet	Place	Ref.
100 y	9.43+ (−0.4 m/s)	Su Bingtian	17 June 2014	Golden Spike Ostrava	Ostrava, Czech Republic	
100 m	9.83 (+0.9 m/s)	Su Bingtian	1 August 2021	Olympic Games	Tokyo, Japan	
150 m (bend)	15.90 (−0.9 m/s)	Zhang Ruixuan	11 February 2017	Nitro Athletics Round 3	Melbourne, Australia	
200 m	19.88 (+0.9 m/s)	Xie Zhenye	21 July 2019	Diamond League	London, United Kingdom	
400 m	45.14	Guo Zhongze	3 September 2017	National Games	Tianjin, China	
800 m	1:45.66	Liu Dezhu	20 April 2024	Xiamen Diamond League	Xiamen, China	
1500 m	3:36.49	Dou Zhaobo	24 October 2003	National City Games	Changsha, China	
Mile	3:59.75	Gu Ming	3 June 2006	Reebok Grand Prix	New York City, United States	
3000 m	7:56.19	Zhang Guowei	23 June 1987	Czech Grand Prix	Prague, Czechoslovakia	
5000 m	13:25.14	Xia Fengyuan	23 October 1997	Chinese National Games	Shanghai, China	
5 km (road)	13:52	Mao Jinhu	31 December 2023	Cursa dels Nassos	Barcelona, Spain	
5 km (road)	13:52	Mao Jinhu	31 December 2024	Cursa dels Nassos	Barcelona, Spain	
10,000 m	27:47.53	Wang Wenjie	30 May 2026	22nd Nittaidai Challenge Games	Yokohama, Japan	
10 km (road)	28:49	Mao Jinhu	12 January 2025	10K Valencia Ibercaja	Valencia, Spain	
15 km (road)	44:36+	Feng Peiyou	1 March 2026	Tokyo Marathon	Tokyo, Japan	
20 km (road)	59:35+	Feng Peiyou	1 March 2026	Tokyo Marathon	Tokyo, Japan	
Half marathon	1:01:15	Wang Wenjie	12 April 2026	Beijing Half Marathon	Beijing, China	
25 km (road)	1:14:22+	Feng Peiyou	1 March 2026	Tokyo Marathon	Tokyo, Japan	
30 km (road)	1:29:17+	Feng Peiyou	1 March 2026	Tokyo Marathon	Tokyo, Japan	
Marathon	2:05:58	Feng Peiyou	1 March 2026	Tokyo Marathon	Tokyo, Japan	
110 m hurdles	12.88 (+1.1 m/s)	Liu Xiang	11 July 2006	Athletissima	Lausanne, Switzerland	
300 m hurdles	34.95	Xie Zhiyu	26 April 2025	Xiamen Diamond League	Xiamen, China	
400 m hurdles	48.68	Gong Debin	17 November 2025	National Games of China	Guangzhou, China	
400 m hurdles	48.68	Xu Xinfeng	11 July 2026	Asian U23 Championships	Ordos, China	
3000 m steeplechase	8:10.46	Sun Ripeng	19 October 1997	Chinese National Games	Shanghai, China	
High jump	2.39 m	Zhu Jianhua	10 June 1984	International High-Jump Meeting	Eberstadt, West Germany	
Pole vault	5.82 m	Xue Changrui	8 August 2017	World Championships	London, United Kingdom	
Long jump	8.47 m (±0.0 m/s)	Li Jinzhe	28 June 2014 (Note: by World Athletics source, 29 June 2014 by federation source)	Weitsprung-Meeting der Weltklasse	Bad Langensalza, Germany	
Long jump	8.47 m A (+0.7 m/s)	Wang Jianan	16 June 2018	Chinese Grand Prix Final	Guiyang, China	
Triple jump	17.68 m (+1.0 m/s)	Wu Ruiting	4 August 2025	Chinese Championships	Quzhou, China	
Shot put	20.44 m	Xing Jialiang	4 August 2025	Chinese Championships	Quzhou, China	
Discus throw	67.29 m	Abuduaini Tuergong	11 June 2025	Abendsportfest	Neubrandenburg, Germany	
Hammer throw	77.04 m	Bi Zhong	4 August 1989		Jinggangshan, China	
Javelin throw	89.15 m	Zhao Qinggang	2 October 2014	Asian Games	Incheon, South Korea	
Decathlon	8290 pts	Qi Haifeng	28–29 May 2005	Hypo-Meeting	Götzis, Austria	
Decathlon	100m (wind) / Long jump (wind) / Shot put / High jump / 400m / 110m H (wind) / Discus / Pole vault / Javelin / 1500m; 10.87 (+0.9 m/s) / 7.40 m (+0.1 m/s) / 13.41 m / 2.03 m / 48.72 / 14.63 (−1.4 m/s) / 48.57 m / 4.70 m / 64.53 m / 4:32.02					
5000 m walk (track)	18:49.10	Wang Zhen	13 September 2014	Meeting Internazionale di Atletica Leggera	Fossano, Italy	
10,000 m walk (track)	38:23.73	Wang Zhen	8 February 2015	Trofeo Ugo Frigerio	Genova, Italy	
10 km walk (road)	37:44	Wang Zhen	18 September 2010	World Race Walking Challenge	Beijing, China	
20,000 m walk (track)	1:18:03.3 h	Bo Lingtang	7 April 1994	Chinese Race Walking Championships	Beijing, China	
20 km walk (road)	1:16:54	Wang Kaihua	20 March 2021	Chinese Race Walking Championships	Huangshan, China	
35 km walk (road)	2:22:55	He Xianghong	4 March 2023	Chinese National Race Walk Grand Prix	Huangshan, China	
50,000 m walk (track)	3:48:13.7	Zhao Yongsheng	7 May 1994		Fana, Norway	
50 km walk (road)	3:36:06	Yu Chaohong	22 October 2005	Chinese National Games	Nanjing, China	
4 × 100 m relay	37.79	China; Su Bingtian; Xu Zhouzheng; Wu Zhiqiang; Xie Zhenye	4 October 2019	World Championships	Doha, Qatar	
4 × 100 m relay	37.79	China; Tang Xingqiang; Xie Zhenye; Su Bingtian; Wu Zhiqiang	6 August 2021	Olympic Games	Tokyo, Japan	
4 × 200 m relay	1:20.83	Shandong Team; Wang Shengjie; Xie Yuqiang; Zhang Yaorong; Qiao Zhen	23 September 2021	National Games	Xi'an, China	
4 × 200 m relay	1:20.83	Guangdong Team; Su Bingtian; Zhang Ruixian; Mo Youxue; Yan Haibin	23 September 2021	National Games	Xi'an, China	
4 × 400 m relay	3:00.77	China; Liu Kai; Liang Baotang; Guo Longyu; Zhang Qining	20 September 2025	World Championships	Tokyo, Japan	
4 × 800 m relay	7:26.0	China; Han Bo; Qin Dingchun; Wang Da; Zhang Jinsong	3 October 1991	Chinese Championships	Shanghai, China	

=== Women ===
Event	Record	Athlete	Date	Meet	Place	Ref.
100 m	10.79 (±0.0 m/s)	Li Xuemei	18 October 1997	Chinese National Games	Shanghai, China	
150 m (bend)	18.17 NWI	Fu Na	4 February 2017	Nitro Athletics Round 1	Melbourne, Australia	
200 m	22.01 (±0.0 m/s)	Li Xuemei	22 October 1997	Chinese National Games	Shanghai, China	
400 m	49.81	Ma Yuqin	11 September 1993	Chinese National Games	Beijing, China	
800 m	1:55.54	Liu Dong	9 September 1993	Chinese National Games	Beijing, China	
1500 m	3:50.46	Qu Yunxia	11 September 1993	Chinese National Games	Beijing, China	
Mile	4:35.34	Qingfen Wang	5 July 1998	Zipfer Gugl Grand Prix	Linz, Austria	
2000 m	5:29.43+ !	Wang Junxia	12 September 1993	Chinese National Games	Beijing, China	
3000 m	8:06.11	Wang Junxia	13 September 1993	Chinese National Games	Beijing, China	
Two miles	9:49.33	Jin Yuan	20 May 2007	Adidas Track Classic	Carson, United States	
5000 m	14:28.09	Jiang Bo	23 October 1997	Chinese National Games	Shanghai, China	
10,000 m	29:31.78	Wang Junxia	8 September 1993	Chinese National Games	Beijing, China	
10 km (road)	31:49 Mx	Wei Yanan	10 October 1999		Beijing, China	
10 km (road)	32:09+ Wo	Sun Yingjie	3 October 2004	World Half Marathon Championships	New Delhi, India	
15 km (road)	48:23+ Mx	He Wuga	25 October 2026	Valencia Half Marathon	Valencia, Spain	
15 km (road)	48:37+ Wo	Sun Yingjie	3 October 2004	World Half Marathon Championships	New Delhi, India	
20 km (road)	1:04:42+ Mx	He Wuga	25 October 2026	Valencia Half Marathon	Valencia, Spain	
Half marathon	1:07:55 Mx	Zhang Deshun	25 February 2024	Meishan Renshou Half Marathon	Meishan, China	
Half marathon	1:08:40 Wo	Sun Yingjie	3 October 2004	World Half Marathon Championships	New Delhi, India	
30 km (road)	1:45:22	Yi Miaomiao	19 February 2006		Ōme, Japan	
Marathon	2:19:39	Sun Yingjie	19 October 2003	Beijing Marathon	Beijing, China	
100 m hurdles	12.64 (+0.1 m/s)	Zhang Yu	9 September 1993	Chinese National Games	Beijing, China	
400 m hurdles	53.96	Han Qing	9 September 1993	Chinese National Games	Beijing, China	
400 m hurdles	53.96	Song Yinglan	22 November 2001		Guangzhou, China	
2000 m steeplechase	6:21.85	Xu Shuangshuang	1 September 2019	ISTAF Berlin	Berlin, Germany	
3000 m steeplechase	9:20.32	Zhang Xinyan	8 April 2021		Shaoxing, China	
High jump	1.97 m	Jin Ling	7 May 1989		Hamamatsu, Japan	
Pole vault	4.73 m	Niu Chunge	31 May 2026	National Grand Prix 4	Bengbu, China	
Long jump	7.01 m (+1.4 m/s)	Yao Weili	5 June 1993	Chinese Championships	Jinan, China	
Triple jump	14.90 m (+1.0 m/s)	Xie Limei	20 September 2007	Chinese Championships	Ürümqi, China	
Shot put	21.76 m	Li Meisu	23 April 1988	Shijiazhuang Track Classic	Shijiazhuang, China	
Discus throw	71.68 m	Xiao Yanling	14 March 1992		Beijing, China	
Hammer throw	79.62 m	Zhang Jiale	12 September 2026	National Hammer Throw Competition	Huai'an, China	
Javelin throw	71.74 m	Yan Ziyi	23 May 2026	Xiamen Diamond League	Xiamen, China	
Heptathlon	6750 pts NWI	Ma Miaolan	11–12 September 1993	Chinese National Games	Beijing, China	
Heptathlon	100m H (wind) / High jump / Shot put / 200m (wind) / Long jump (wind) / Javelin / 800m; 13.28 (+1.5 m/s) / 1.89 m / 14.98 m / 23.86 (±0.0 m/s) / 6.64 m (NWI) / 45.82 m / 2:15.83					
5000 m walk (track)	20:34.76	Liu Hong	16 September 2012	Chinese University Games	Tianjin, China	
5 km walk (road)	21:30	Wu Quanming	14 April 2018		Shangrao, China	
5 km walk (road)	20:41+	Liu Hongyu	8 May 1999	Oder-Neisse Race Walk Grand Prix	Eisenhüttenstadt, Germany	
5 km walk (road)	21:16	Jin Bingjie	5 May 1990		Enhörna, Sweden	
5 km walk (road)	21:26	Li Jingxue	5 May 1990		Enhörna, Sweden	
10,000 m walk (track)	41:37.9 h	Gao Hongmiao	7 April 1994	Chinese Race Walking Championships	Beijing, China	
10 km walk (road)	41:16	Wang Yan	8 May 1999	Oder-Neisse Race Walk Grand Prix	Eisenhüttenstadt, Germany	
20,000 m walk (track)
20,000 m walk (track)	1:29:32.4 h	Hongjuan Song	23 October 2003	National City Games	Changsha, China	
20 km walk (road)	1:23:49	Yang Jiayu	20 March 2021	Chinese Race Walking Championships	Huangshan, China	
Half Marathon walk (road)	1:31:39	Jiang Yunyan	1 March 2026	Chinese Race Walking Grand Prix	Taicang, China	
30 km walk (road)	2:15:37+	Liu Hong	16 April 2023	Japanese 35 km Racewalking Championships	Wajima, Japan	
35 km walk (road)	2:38:42	Liu Hong	16 April 2023	Japanese 35 km Racewalking Championships	Wajima, Japan	
Marathon walk (road)	3:24:48	Chen Mengyuan	2 March 2026	Chinese Race Walking Grand Prix	Taicang, China	
50 km walk (road)	3:59:15	Liu Hong	9 March 2019	Chinese Race Walk Grand Prix	Huangshan, China	
4 × 100 m relay	42.23	Sichuan Team; Xiao Lin; Li Yali; Liu Xiaomei; Li Xuemei	23 October 1997	Chinese National Games	Shanghai, China	
4 × 200 m relay	1:32.76	China; Liang Xiaojing; Wei Yongli; Kong Lingwei; Ge Manqi	12 May 2019	IAAF World Relays	Yokohama, Japan	
4 × 400 m relay	3:24.28	Hebei Team; An Xiaohong; Bai Xiaoyun; Cao Chunying; Ma Yuqin	13 September 1993	Chinese National Games	Beijing, China	
4 × 800 m relay	8:16.2 h	Liaoning Team; Liu Dong; Chen Yumei; Qu Yunxia; Liu Li	3 October 1991	Chinese Championships	Shanghai, China	
Ekiden relay	2:11:41	Jiang Bo 15:42 (5 km); Dong Yanmei 31:36 (10 km); Zhao Fengting 15:16 (5 km); Ma Zaijie 31:01 (10 km); Lan Lixin 15:50 (5 km); Lin Na 22:16 (7.195 km)	28 February 1998		Beijing, China	

=== Mixed ===
Event	Record	Athlete	Date	Meet	Place	Ref.
4 × 100 m relay	41.30	China; Huang Shuping; Kong Lingyao; Chen Jinfeng; Chen Guanfeng	10 May 2025	World Relays	Guangzhou, China	
4 × 400 m relay	3:13.39	China; Liang Boatang; Mo Jiadie; Zhang Qining; Liu Yinglan	11 May 2025	World Relays	Guangzhou, China	

== Indoor ==
=== Men ===
Event	Record	Athlete	Date	Meet	Place	Ref.
60 m	6.42	Su Bingtian	3 March 2018	World Championships	Birmingham, United Kingdom	
200 m	20.75	Zhang Peimeng	30 March 2013	National Grand Prix	Beijing, China	
400 m	45.79	Ailixier Wumaier	31 March 2024	Chinese Championships	Tianjin, China	
800 m	1:46.63	Liu Dezhu	12 March 2024	National Indoor Grand Prix 3	Jinan, China	
1000 m	2:25.8 h	Lin Jun	13 February 1993		Beijing, China	
1500 m	3:43.40	Liu Dezhu	15 March 2023	Chinese Championships	Tianjin, China	
2000 m	5:15.8	Cao Xulong	18 March 1994		Beijing, China	
3000 m	8:01.41	Zhang Yunshan	3 March 2002	Chinese Championships	Tianjin, China	
50 m hurdles	6.50	Li Tong	19 February 1994	Sunkist Invitational	Los Angeles, United States	
50 m hurdles	6.44+	Liu Xiang	28 February 2004	Meeting Pas de Calais	Liévin, France	
55 m hurdles	7.08	Li Tong	8 March 1991	NCAA Division I Championships	Indianapolis, United States	
60 m hurdles	7.41	Liu Xiang	18 February 2012	Aviva Indoor Grand Prix	Birmingham, United Kingdom	
High jump	2.34 m	Wang Yu	20 February 2019	PSD Bank Meeting	Düsseldorf, Germany	
Pole vault	5.81 m	Xue Changrui	16 January 2016	Perche Elite Tour	Orléans, France	
Long jump	8.27 m	Su Xiongfeng	11 March 2010		Nanjing, China	
Triple jump	17.41 m	Dong Bin	29 February 2016	National Grand Prix	Nanjing, China	
Shot put	20.16 m	Zhang Jun	13 February 2012	Chinese Grand Prix	Nanjing, China	
Heptathlon	5763 pts	Qi Haifeng	24–25 February 2006	Chinese Championships	Beijing, China	
Heptathlon	60m / Long jump / Shot put / High jump / 60m H / Pole vault / 1000m; 7.13 / 7.24 m / 13.14 m / 2.00 m / 8.38 / 4.80 m / 2:42.31					
5000 m walk						
10,000 m walk						
4 × 400 m relay	3:06.90	China; Zheng Chiyu; Zhang Qining; Xu Xinlong; Ju Tianqi	23 March 2025	World Championships	Nanjing, China	

=== Women ===
Event	Record	Athlete	Date	Meet	Place	Ref.
60 m	7.10	Ge Manqi	19 March 2019	National Grand Prix Final	Hangzhou, China	
200 m	23.52	Jiang Lan	7 March 2013	National Grand Prix	Nanjing, China	
200 m	23.1 h	Chen Zhaojing	24 March 1990		Jinan, China	
400 m	52.27	Li Yajun	24 February 1996	Chinese Championships	Beijing, China	
800 m	2:02.90	Liu Qing	1 March 2005		Tianjin, China	
1000 m	2:46.6 h	Geng Xiujuan	27 March 1987		Beijing, China	
1500 m	4:09.71	Xue Fei	13 February 2012	Chinese Grand Prix	Nanjing, China	
2000 m	5:55.6 h	Liu Jianying	18 March 1994		Beijing, China	
3000 m	8:41.34	Dong Yanmei	10 March 2001	World Championships	Lisbon, Portugal	
5000 m	16:07.75 OT	Jin Yuan	3 March 2007		Seattle, United States	
60 m hurdles	8.01	Wu Yanni	23 March 2025	World Championships	Nanjing, China	
High jump	1.95 m	Zheng Xingjuan	9 March 2014	National Grand Prix	Nanjing, China	
Pole vault	4.70 m	Li Ling	19 February 2016	Asian Championships	Doha, Qatar	
Long jump	6.82 m	Yang Juan	13 March 1992		Beijing, China	
Long jump	6.96 m	Wang Yanping	4 February 2017	National Championships	Baku, Azerbaijan	
Triple jump	14.40 m	Huang Qiuyan	10 March 2002		Shanghai, China	
Shot put	21.10 m	Sui Xinmei	3 March 1990		Beijing, China	
Discus throw	60.68 m	Chen Yang	27 March 2020		Beijing, China	
Hammer throw	69.44 m	Luo Na	30 May 2020		Beijing, China	
Javelin throw	64.34 m	Lü Huihui	29 May 2020		Beijing, China	
Pentathlon	4415 pts	Wang Qingling	22 March 2014	National Championships	Beijing, China	
Pentathlon	60m H / High jump / Shot put / Long jump / 800m; 8.41 / 1.79 m / 12.33 m / 6.29 m / 2:22.55					
3000 m walk	13:05.56	Yan Hong	18 January 1985	World Indoor Games	Paris, France	
4 × 400 m relay	3:38.17	China; Ni Xiaoli; Bu Fanfang; Chen Lisha; Zhang Xiaoyuan	22 February 2003		Yokohama, Japan	
