= Wang Yuan (athlete) =

Chinese middle-distance runner

Wang Yuan (Chinese: 王媛; pinyin: Wáng Yuán; born April 8, 1976) is a Chinese former track and field athlete who specialized in middle-distance running. She made her international debut at the 1993 World Championships in Athletics, failing to progress beyond the heats.

On September 8, 1993, while still a 17-year-old, she set the world youth best in the 800 metres at 1:57.18 minutes while qualifying for the final at the Chinese national games. That meet has been an anomaly amongst athletics records due to the freakish string of records set by Chinese women during the meet. The following day, Wang ran 1:58.16 to finish fifth in the final behind the still standing Asian record 1:55.54 set by Liu Dong (who had won the World Championship a month earlier). Two days after that, Wang ran in the 1500 metres final, finishing in seventh place, but again her time of 3:59.81 was another world youth best, bettering the record of 4:01.79 she had set in qualifying. In two races, Wang took more than six seconds out of the previous record. That race was won by Qu Yunxia (who had won the 3000 metres at the world championships a month earlier), in a world record of 3:50.46 that lasted almost 22 years. Ahead of her in that race was also Wang Junxia (the world champion at 10,000 metres a month earlier) running the second fastest time to that point in time. Wang Junxia also set world records in the 3000 and 10000 at that meet.

In all, eleven Asian records were set in that one meet by the Chinese women, three of them were world records. The records survived over two decades later, six Asian records survive and one of the world records. For the records that were surpassed and the closest challenge to the ones who survived came at the same meet four years later. Yet none of the athletes from the 1993 meeting repeated in 1997. Even though most of the women were in their teens or early 20s, only Wang Junxia made it to the 1996 Olympics (where she picked up a gold and silver medal).

Wang and virtually all the others disappeared and never produced notable results after 1994. Most of the distance runners were coached by Ma Junren who was suspected of doping his athletes. While charges were never brought against Ma, Wang Junxia dropped him as her coach before she went to the Olympics. Six of his athletes failed blood tests. But it was Ma Junren's group of women who in 1997 produced Jiang Bo setting the world record in the 5000 metres and just missing Qu Yunxia's world record in the 1500, Dong Yanmei chasing Bo to the record, Li Jing setting the still standing Youth best at 400 metres and Lang Yinglai setting the still standing world junior record in the 1500. Just behind Yinglai was Zhang Ling who took more than four seconds off Wang's record in qualifying and another in the final to take the record to 3:54.52. Also in 1997, Lin Na ran 1:58.16, matching Wang's time as the second-best performance ever, but Wang's youth best still stands, and Lin was the only girl to come within two seconds of the mark.

== Personal bests ==
- 800 metres – 1:57.18 min (1993) WYB
- 1500 metres – 3:59.81 min (1993)
