= Zhang Ling (runner) =

Chinese middle-distance runner

Medal record

Women's athletics

Representing China

Asian Championships
Silver medal – second place	2000 Jakarta	1500 m

Zhang Ling (born 13 April 1980) is a female Chinese middle-distance runner.

On 18 October 1997 in Shanghai she ran the 1500 metres in 3:54.52 minutes. This ranked her eighth in the world all-time lists, behind Qu Yunxia, Jiang Bo, Lang Yinglai, Wang Junxia, Tatyana Kazankina, Yin Lili, Paula Ivan, Lan Lixin and Olga Dvirna. This is also the world record for youth (aged 17 or less) athletes.

== Achievements ==
Year	Competition	Venue	Position	Notes
Representing China
2000	Asian Championships	Jakarta, Indonesia	2nd	1500 m
