= Lee Mi-gyeong =

Lee Mi-gyeong, Lee Mi-kyung or Ri Mi-gyong (Korean: 이미경) may refer to:

- Lee Mi-kyung (politician) (born 1950), South Korean politician
- Lee Mi-kyung (sport shooter) (born 1969), South Korean sport shooter
- Lee Mi-gyeong (athlete) (born 1975), South Korean long-distance runner
- Ri Mi-gyong (born 1990), North Korean table tennis player
- Lee Mi-gyeong (handballer) (born 1991), South Korean handball player
