= Sun Yingjie =

Chinese long-distance runner

- Born: January 19, 1979 (age 47); Sujiatun, Shenyang, Liaoning

Sun Yingjie
Medal record

Women's athletics

Representing China

World Championships
Bronze medal – third place	2003 Paris	10,000 m

Asian Games
Gold medal – first place	2002 Busan	5000 m
Gold medal – first place	2002 Busan	10,000 m

Asian Championships
Gold medal – first place	2003 Manila	5000 m
Gold medal – first place	2003 Manila	10,000 m

World Half Marathon Championships
Gold medal – first place	2004 Delhi	Half marathon

Sun Yingjie (simplified Chinese: 孙英杰; traditional Chinese: 孫英傑; pinyin: Sūn Yīngjié; born January 19, 1979) is a Chinese female long-distance runner who competes in events ranging from 5000 metres to the marathon. She rose to prominence by winning two gold medals at the 2002 Asian Games. In 2003, she won a bronze medal in the 10,000 metres at the World Championships in Paris. She won two golds at the 2003 Asian Athletics Championships and won the Beijing Marathon in an Asian record time that year.

She represented China at the 2004 Athens Olympics, reaching the top eight in the 5000 m and 10,000 m finals, and set a national record to win the gold at the 2004 IAAF World Half Marathon Championships. The following year Sun ran at the 2005 World Championships and won the Beijing Marathon for a second time. Two days after her win, she won a silver medal at the 2005 National Games of China, but failed a drug test. A former training partner confessed in court to spiking her drink with androsterone, but she still received a two-year ban from the sport. She returned to competition in 2008 but was far from her best form and did not qualify for the 2008 Summer Olympics.

== Career ==
=== Marathon success and world medallist ===
From 1997 to 2000, Sun Yingjie focused on marathons. Her major marathon debut was in the Chinese National Games in October 1997 where she finished 10th (2:32:43). In 1998, she ran her first sub-2:30 race in National Championships in Tianjin (2:25:45). In 1999, she came in 12th (2:30:12) in Seville.

In 2001, after finishing third and second in 5000 m (15:02.70) and 10,000 m (31:49.47), respectively in 2001 Chinese National Games, she expanded into the shorter races. In the 2002 Asian Games in Busan, she achieved double wins in both 5000 m (14:40.41) and 10,000 m (30:28.26). Her 10,000m winning time ranked second in 2002 world list.

During the 2003 World Championships she achieved her greatest success when she won the bronze medal in 10,000 metres (30:07.20). The race was considered the fastest women's 10,000m race in history in that the top four finishers ran times that ranked 3rd, 4th, 5th and 6th fastest of all time. Two continental records, five national records and the world junior record were also broken in this race. Sun led most of the race and was only overtaken by Ethiopian runners in the last lap. She also finished 9th in 5000 m in a respectable time of 14:57.01 during the same competition.

In October 2003, she became the first Chinese woman and fourth woman in the world to break the 2 hour 20 minute time in a women's marathon when she won her second Beijing Marathon at 2:19:39 which was also a former Asian best.

In 2004, Sun had a disappointing debut in Olympic Games in Athens where she finished 8th in 5000 m (15:07.23) and 6th in 10,000 m (30:54.37) due to the injuries during training in the winter. After the Olympics, she bounced back in October to win the world title in half marathon with a time of 68:40.

=== 2005 doping ban ===
Although her times in 2005 Helsinki improved from the Olympics, she only placed 11th in 5000 m (14:51.19) and 7th in 10,000 m (30:33.53). Later in October, she won her 4th straight Beijing Marathon title with quality time of 2:21:01.

The after-competition drug test was negative. Two days later, she appeared in Nanjing and finished 2nd in 10,000 m behind Xing Huina in the Chinese National Games. Following the race, she tested positive in a drug test and was banned from competing for two years. Her two-year ban was upheld despite a civil court ruling that another athlete, Yu Haijiang, had spiked her drink with androsterone.

=== Return and retirement ===
She made her return to athletics at the 2008 Xiamen International Marathon in January. She ran with the leading group up until the 20 km mark, but then faded in the second half of the race and finished with time of 2:38:21 – some 15 minutes behind winner Zhang Yingying. In spite of this, she was upbeat about her performance and considered her preparations for the 2008 Summer Olympics to be on schedule. Her performances on the track later that year did not reflect this, however, as she finished outside of the top eight in both the 5000 and 10,000 m races at the Chinese Outdoor Grand Prix. She had failed to earn enough points for national selection at the 2008 Beijing Olympics and missed her chance to represent her country at the highest level in her home nation.

She consoled herself with an appearance at the Good Luck Beijing China Athletics Open in the Bird's Nest Stadium – a pre-games test event. Although she had not been initially selected for the meeting, she received a special invitation to compete. However, she managed only twelfth place in the 5000 m: "I wanted to take part in the Olympic Games, but I have no chance now. But I got to experience the Olympic atmosphere in advance, which gave me a little relief...I'm thankful that people still remember me. I felt so sorry for running so poorly." She set her sights on making the 2008 Beijing Marathon and the 2009 National Games of China her final major performances of her career. She did not run at either competition and has not competed internationally since 2008.

== International competitions ==
Year	Competition	Venue	Position	Event	Notes
Representing China
1999	World Championships	Seville, Spain	12th	Marathon	2:30:12
2002	Asian Games	Busan, South Korea	1st	5,000 m	
2002	Asian Games	Busan, South Korea	1st	10,000 m	
2003	World Championships	Paris, France	9th	5,000 m	14:57.01
2003	World Championships	Paris, France	3rd	10,000 m	30:07.20
2003	Asian Championships	Manila, Philippines	1st	5,000 m	
2003	Asian Championships	Manila, Philippines	1st	10,000 m	
2004	Olympic Games	Athens, Greece	8th	5,000 m	15:07.23
2004	Olympic Games	Athens, Greece	6th	10,000 m	30:54.37
2004	World Half Marathon Championships	New Delhi, India	1st	Half marathon	1:08:40 NR
2005	World Championships	Helsinki, Finland	11th	5000 m	14:51.19
2005	World Championships	Helsinki, Finland	7th	10,000 m	30:33.53

== National competitions ==
Year	Competition	Venue	Position	Event	Notes
1997	Chinese National Games	Shanghai, China	10th	Marathon	2:32:43
2001	Chinese National Games	Guangdong, China	3rd	5000 m	15:02.70
2001	Chinese National Games	Guangdong, China	2nd	10,000 m	31:49.47
2001	Beijing Marathon	Beijing, China	11th	Marathon	2:29:16
2002	Beijing Marathon	Beijing, China	2nd	Marathon	2:21:21
2003	Beijing Marathon	Beijing, China	1st	Marathon	2:19:39 AR
2005	Beijing Marathon	Beijing, China	1st	Marathon	2:21:01
2005	Chinese National Games	Beijing, China	DQ	10,000 m	Originally 2nd

== See also ==
- List of doping cases in athletics
- China at the World Championships in Athletics
