= Yu Wenge =

Chinese discus thrower (born 1966)

Medal record

Men's athletics

Representing China

IAAF World Cup
Silver medal – second place	1992 Havana	Discus throw

Asian Championships
Gold medal – first place	1991 Kuala Lumpur	Discus throw

Yu Wenge (Chinese: 于文革; born 18 March 1966) is a Chinese former track and field athlete who specialised in the discus throw. He was a three-time Chinese champion and one-time Asian champion.

He became the first person to throw beyond sixty metres at the Asian Athletics Championships, winning the gold medal with a mark of 62.20 m (204 ft 3/4 in) in 1991. He set a meet record and lifetime best of 65.02 m (213 ft 3 3/4 in) at the 1992 Chinese Athletics Championships, defending his first title from the previous year. He gained selection for China at the 1992 Summer Olympics as a result and finished 17th in the qualifying round. He performed better at the following 1992 IAAF World Cup held in Havana, taking the bronze medal with a throw of 63.06 m (206 ft 10 1/2 in) behind Anthony Washington and Roberto Moya.

After a low period, he had a late career resurgence at the age of 31 in 1997. He regained his title from Li Shaojie at the Chinese Championships and then won at the 1997 National Games of China with a games record of 62.70 m (205 ft 8 1/2 in). In his final global appearance he ranked 15th in qualifying at the 1997 World Championships in Athletics.

== International competitions ==
Year	Competition	Venue	Position	Notes
1991	Asian Championships	Kuala Lumpur, Malaysia	1st	62.20 m
1992	Olympic Games	Barcelona, Spain	17th (q)	59.42 m
1992	IAAF World Cup	Havana, Cuba	3rd	63.06 m
1997	World Championships	Athens, Greece	15th (q)	57.14 m

== National titles ==
- Chinese Athletics Championships
  - Discus throw: 1991, 1992, 1997
- Chinese National Games
  - Discus throw: 1997
