= Pei Fang =

Chinese sprinter (born 1972)

Medal record

Women's athletics

Representing China

Asian Championships
Gold medal – first place	1991 Kuala Lumpur	4×100 m
Silver medal – second place	1991 Kuala Lumpur	100 m
Silver medal – second place	1991 Kuala Lumpur	4×400 m

Pei Fang (born 1 February 1972) is a former Chinese track and field athlete, who specialized in sprinting events.

Affiliated to the Shanghai's track and field team, she took part in the National Games of China, competing in the 100 metres event. She won her heat in 11.16 seconds. In the semi-finals, she finished second and clocked 11.09 seconds, 0.06 s behind Sichuan runner Liu Xiaomei.

In the final, she finished fourth in 11.10 s in a race won Li Xuemei in 10.79 s. Liu Xiaomei won the silver medal in 10.89 s and twice Olympian Tian Yumei took the bronze, crossing the line in 11.06 s.

Pei's career seems to have ended with those National Games, as she did not compete in any competitions after 1997.

== Achievements ==
Year	Competition	Venue	Position	Notes
1990	Asian Junior Championships	Beijing, China	1st	23.52
1991	Asian Championships	Kuala Lumpur, Malayasia	2nd	11.62
1991	Asian Championships	Kuala Lumpur, Malayasia	1st	43.41
1997	World Championships	Athens, Greece	28th (qf)	11.50
1997	World Championships	Athens, Greece	8th	43.32
1997	8th National Games of China	Shanghai, China	4th	11.09 (PB)

== Records ==
Event	Time	Venue	Date
100 m	11.09 s	Shanghai, China	1997
200 m	23.01 s	Beijing, China	1993
4 × 100 m	42.92 s	Athens, Greece	1997
