= 1992 World Junior Championships in Athletics – Women's 1500 metres =

The women's 1500 metres event at the 1992 World Junior Championships in Athletics was held in Seoul, South Korea, at Olympic Stadium on 18 and 20 September.

== Medalists ==
Gold	Liu Dong; China
Silver	Jackline Maranga; Kenya
Bronze	Li Ying; China

== Results ==
=== Final ===
20 September

Rank	Name	Nationality	Time	Notes
1st place, gold medalist(s)	Liu Dong	China	4:05.14	
2nd place, silver medalist(s)	Jackline Maranga	Kenya	4:08.79	
3rd place, bronze medalist(s)	Li Ying	China	4:09.04	
4	Nami Sugimura	Japan	4:13.53	
5	Lee Mi-Gyeong	South Korea	4:14.18	
6	Carmen Wüstenhagen	Germany	4:15.74	
7	Yoshiko Ichikawa	Japan	4:17.07	
8	Elena Cosoveanu	Romania	4:17.70	
9	Kate Anderson	Australia	4:20.45	
10	Jeina Mitchell	United Kingdom	4:21.26	
11	Egigayehu Worku	Ethiopia	4:22.26	
12	Janeth Caizalitín	Ecuador	4:23.95	

=== Heats ===
18 September

==== Heat 1 ====
Rank	Name	Nationality	Time	Notes
1	Li Ying	China	4:14.73	Q
2	Elena Cosoveanu	Romania	4:15.34	Q
3	Yoshiko Ichikawa	Japan	4:15.58	Q
4	Egigayehu Worku	Ethiopia	4:15.79	Q
5	Lee Mi-Gyeong	South Korea	4:18.54	q
6	Janeth Caizalitín	Ecuador	4:19.49	q
7	Antje Beggerow	Germany	4:20.91	
8	Evette Turner	Jamaica	4:22.30	
9	Helen Kimutai	Kenya	4:23.23	

==== Heat 2 ====
Rank	Name	Nationality	Time	Notes
1	Liu Dong	China	4:17.13	Q
2	Jackline Maranga	Kenya	4:18.65	Q
3	Carmen Wüstenhagen	Germany	4:18.87	Q
4	Jeina Mitchell	United Kingdom	4:19.09	Q
5	Nami Sugimura	Japan	4:19.26	q
6	Kate Anderson	Australia	4:19.96	q
7	Park Hyun-Hee	South Korea	4:21.48	
8	Truzanne Swanepoel	South Africa	4:21.96	
9	Simona Oltean	Romania	4:37.46	

== Participation ==
According to an unofficial count, 18 athletes from 12 countries participated in the event.

- Australia (1)
- China (2)
- Ecuador (1)
- Ethiopia (1)
- Germany (2)
- Jamaica (1)
- Japan (2)
- Kenya (2)
- Romania (2)
- South Africa (1)
- South Korea (2)
- United Kingdom (1)
