= Xiao Lin =

Chinese track and field athlete

Xiao Lin (born February 22, 1978, in Sichuan Province) is a former Chinese track and field athlete who specialized in sprinting events.

She is the current Asian record holder on 4 x 100 metres relay in 42.23 s, achieved in 1997 in Shanghai during the 8th Chinese National Games with Li Yali, Liu Xiaomei and Li Xuemei.

She also holds the Chinese junior record on 100 m with a time of 11.17 s; clocked in the same competition and has a 200 m personal best of 23.27 s, set in Ningbo in April 2001.
