= Ali Ismail Doka =

Qatari sprinter

Personal information
- Nationality: Qatari
- Born: 11 May 1973 (age 53)

Sport
- Sport: Sprinting
- Event: 400 metres hurdles
Medal record
Men's athletics
Representing Qatar
Asian Championships
Gold medal – first place	1995 Jakarta	4×400 m relay
Bronze medal – third place	1993 Manila	400 m hurdles
Bronze medal – third place	1995 Jakarta	400 m hurdles
Asian Games
Bronze medal – third place	1994 Hiroshima	400 m hurdles
Bronze medal – third place	1994 Hiroshima	4x400 m relay

Ali Ismail Doka (born 11 May 1973) is a Qatari sprinter. He competed in the men's 4 × 400 metres relay at the 1996 Summer Olympics.
