= Zhang Hengyun =

Chinese sprinter (born 1974)

Medal record

Women's athletics

Representing China

Asian Championships
Gold medal – first place	1993 Manila	4×400 m
Gold medal – first place	1995 Jakarta	400 m
Gold medal – first place	1995 Jakarta	4×400 m

Zhang Hengyun (born 25 October 1974) is a former Chinese sprinter who mainly competed over 400 metres.

== Achievements ==
Year	Competition	Venue	Position	Event	Notes
Representing China
1992	World Junior Championships	Seoul, South Korea	21st (heats)	400m	56.06
1993	Chinese National Games	Beijing, China	2nd	400m	51.25
1994	World Cup	London, Great Britain	6th	400m	52.79
1994	Asian Games	Hiroshima, Japan	2nd	400m	52.53
1995	World Indoor Championships	Barcelona, Spain	18th (heats)	400 m	54.27
1995	World Indoor Championships	Barcelona, Spain	5th	4 × 400 m	3:39.76 (AR)
1995	Asian Championships	Jakarta, Indonesia	1st	400 m	52.06
1995	World Championships	Gothenburg, Sweden	22nd (semi-finals)	400 m	52.59
1997	Chinese National Games	Shanghai, China	4th	400 m	51.22 (PB)
1997	Chinese National Games	Shanghai, China	1st	4 × 400 m	3:26.88
1998	Asian Games	Bangkok, Thailand	5th	400 m	53.92
2001	Chinese National Games	Guangzhou, China	Semi-finalist	200 m	24.00 (PB)
2001	Chinese National Games	Guangzhou, China	4th	400 m	52.44
2001	Chinese National Games	Guangzhou, China	2nd	4 × 100 m	44.23
2001	Chinese National Games	Guangzhou, China	3rd	4 × 400 m	3:32.37

== Personal bests ==
Event	Time	Venue	Date
200 m	24.00 s	Guangzhou, China	2001
400 m	51.22 s	Shanghai, China	1997
400 m indoor	53.68	Beijing, China	1996
