= 1995 Asian Athletics Championships =

1995 Asian Championships
- Dates: September 20-24
- Host city: Jakarta, Indonesia
- Venue: Senayan Main Stadium
- Participation: at least 20 nations

The 11th Asian Championships in Athletics were held in late September 1995 in Jakarta, Indonesia.

== Medal summary ==
=== Men ===
Event	Gold		Silver		Bronze	
100 metres (wind: +0.4 m/s)	Lin Wei; China	10.34	Anvar Kuchmuradov; Uzbekistan	10.43	Yoshitaka Ito; Japan	10.45
200 metres (wind: +1.8 m/s)	Abdulaziz Mattar; Bahrain	20.76 (NR)	Huang Danwei; China	20.79	Jun Osakada; Japan	21.20
400 metres	Ibrahim Ismail Muftah; Qatar	44.96	Son Ju-il; South Korea	46.03	Sugath Tillakaratne; Sri Lanka	46.21
800 metres	Kim Yong-hwan; South Korea	1:50.05	Mohammed Sulaiman; Qatar	1:50.05	Song Mingyou; China	1:50.30
1500 metres	Mohammed Sulaiman; Qatar	3:41.33	Song Mingyou; China	3:42.79	Kim Soon-hyung; South Korea	3:45.08
5000 metres	Saad Shadad Al-Asmari; Saudi Arabia	14:01.43	Marly Sopyev; Turkmenistan	14:02.07	Xia Fengyuan; China	14:07.99
10,000 metres	Marly Sopyev; Turkmenistan	30:04.87	Xia Fengyuan; China	30:05.02	Ahmed Ibrahim Warsama; Qatar	30:06.68
3000 metre steeplechase	Saad Shadad Al-Asmari; Saudi Arabia	8:24.08	Jamal Abdi Hassan; Qatar	8:41.99	Hamid Sajjadi; Iran	8:42.80
110 metres hurdles (wind: +0.5 m/s)	Chen Yanhao; China	13.65	Takahiro Matsuhisa; Japan	13.92	Nur Herman Majid; Malaysia	13.99
400 metres hurdles	Mubarak Al-Nubi; Qatar	50.17	Hideaki Kawamura; Japan	50.45	Ali Ismail Doka; Qatar	50.73
4 × 100 metres relay	China; Huang Danwei; Huang Geng; Li Xiaoping; Lin Wei	39.49	Thailand; Niti Piyapan; Worasit Vechaphut; Visut Watanasin; Reanchai Seeharwong	39.85	Qatar; Masoud Khamis Rahman; Saad Muftah Mubarak Al-Kuwari; Jassem Abbas; Talal Mansour	40.16
4 × 400 metres relay	Qatar; Abdulrahman Hassan; Fareh Ibrahim Ali; Ibrahim Ismail Muftah; Ali Ismail Doka	3:05.78	Japan; Takahiro Kasahara; Yoshitaka Ito; Takahiro Hirakawa; Jun Osakada	3:06.16	Sri Lanka; Suresh Dematapitiya; S.R. Rathnadeepa; Vellasamy Ratnakumara; Sugath Thilakaratne	3:07.87
20,000 metre track walk	Li Mingcai; China	1:23:58.8t	Yuriy Gordeyev; Kazakhstan	1:32:30.9t	Govindasamy Saravanan; Malaysia	1:35:39.6t
High jump	Lee Jin-taek; South Korea	2.26	Xu Yang; China	2.26	Loo Kum Zee; Malaysia	2.19
Pole vault	Hideyuki Takei; Japan	5.30	Kim Chul-kyun; South Korea	5.30	Fumiaki Kobayashi; Japan	5.10
Long jump	Huang Geng; China	8.26	Chao Chih-kuo; Chinese Taipei	7.99w	Abdulrahman Al-Nubi; Qatar	7.87
Triple jump	Zheng Lizhi; China	16.78	Aleksey Fatyanov; Azerbaijan	16.68	Vasif Asadov; Azerbaijan	16.53
Shot put	Bilal Saad Mubarak; Qatar	18.87	Sergey Rubtsov; Kazakhstan	18.66	Shakti Singh; India	18.07
Discus throw	Ma Wei; China	58.44	Roman Poltoratskiy; Uzbekistan	57.36	Vadim Popov; Uzbekistan	56.30
Hammer throw	Bi Zhong; China	70.30	Koji Murofushi; Japan	69.24	Vitaliy Khozatelev; Uzbekistan	68.22
Javelin throw	Zhang Lianbiao; China	79.60	Viktor Zaytsev; Uzbekistan	75.68	Sergey Voynov; Uzbekistan	73.46
Decathlon	Hitoshi Maruono; Japan	7333	Takashi Kiyokawa; Japan	6706	Ibrahim Nasser Al-Matrooshi; UAE	6186

=== Women ===
Event	Gold		Silver		Bronze	
100 metres (wind: +0.9 m/s)	Cui Dangfeng; China	11.36	Susanthika Jayasinghe; Sri Lanka	11.37	Viktoriya Tokonbayeva; Kazakhstan	11.49
200 metres (wind: +0.7 m/s)	Susanthika Jayasinghe; Sri Lanka	23.00	Chen Yanchun; China	23.80	Svetlana Bodritskaya; Kazakhstan	24.20
400 metres	Zhang Hengyun; China	52.06	Li Jing; China	52.33	Shiny Wilson; India	53.69
800 metres	Jyotirmoy Sikdar; India	2:06.75	Kumiko Okamoto; Japan	2:07.28	Shiny Wilson; India	2:07.45
1500 metres	Kumiko Okamoto; Japan	4:18.69	Zhang Jian; China	4:19.87	Wang Qingfen; China	4:21.99
5000 metres	Wang Junxia; China	15:25.65	Tri Asih Handayani; Indonesia	16:39.78	Maisaa Hussein; Iraq	16:42.01
10,000 metres	Wang Junxia; China	33:58.49	Tri Asih Handayani; Indonesia	35:45.07	Maisaa Hussein; Iraq	35:51.76
100 metres hurdles (wind: +0.1 m/s)	Sriyani Kulawansa; Sri Lanka	13.29	Zhang Yu; China	13.44	Hsu Hsiu-Ying; Chinese Taipei	13.58
400 metres hurdles	Hsu Pei-Ching; Chinese Taipei	56.99	Reawadee Watanasin; Thailand	57.98	Natalya Torshina; Kazakhstan	58.88
4 × 100 metres relay	China; Chen Yanchun; Xiao Yehua; Cui Danfeng; Zhou Yihong	44.27	Kazakhstan; Viktoriya Tokonbayeva; Svetlana Bodritskaya; Yelena Selina; Natalia Gridasova	44.69	Thailand; Dokjun Dokdouang; Kwuanfah Inchareon; Reawadee Srithoa-Watanasin; Naparat Suajongprue	44.82
4 × 400 metres relay	China; Li Jing; Lu Xifang; Zhang Hengyun; Cui Danfeng	3:32.73	India; Kannan Solaimathi; Rosa Kutty; Jyotirmoyee Sikdar; Shiny Abraham-Wilson	3:33.43	Thailand; Srirat Chimrak; Noodang Phimphoo; Saleerat Srimek; Reawadee Srithoa-Watanasin	3:41.50
10,000 metre track walk	Feng Haixia; China	45:58.76	Wang Liping; China	46:19.83	Yuka Kamioka; Japan	46:36.39
High jump	Svetlana Zalevskaya; Kazakhstan	1.89	Miki Imai; Japan	1.89	Jaruwan Jenjudkarn; Thailand	1.86
Long jump	Yelena Pershina; Kazakhstan	6.50	Yao Weili; China	6.47	Elma Muros; Philippines	6.37
Triple jump	Ren Ruiping; China	13.99	Wu Lingmei; China	13.81	Yelena Pershina; Kazakhstan	13.17
Shot put	Sui Xinmei; China	18.87	Zhang Zhiying; China	17.58	Yelena Baltabayeva; Kazakhstan	16.07
Discus throw	Li Qiumei; China	58.26	Park Kyung-Hee; South Korea	48.04	Swaranjeet Kaur; India	47.50
Javelin throw	Li Lei; China	60.48	Lee Young-Sun; South Korea	58.68	Ha Xiaoyan; China	55.80
Heptathlon	Svetlana Kazanina; Kazakhstan	5728	Liu Bo; China	5516	Rumiko Ubukata; Japan	5395

== Medal table ==
* Host nation (Indonesia)

Rank	Nation	Gold	Silver	Bronze	Total
1	China (CHN)	20	13	4	37
2	Qatar (QAT)	5	2	4	11
3	Japan (JPN)	3	7	5	15
4	Kazakhstan (KAZ)	3	3	5	11
5	South Korea (KOR)	2	4	1	7
6	Sri Lanka (SRI)	2	1	2	5
7	Saudi Arabia (KSA)	2	0	0	2
8	India (IND)	1	1	4	6
9	Chinese Taipei (TPE)	1	1	1	3
10	Turkmenistan (TKM)	1	1	0	2
11	Bahrain (BHR)	1	0	0	1
12	Uzbekistan (UZB)	0	3	3	6
13	Thailand (THA)	0	2	3	5
14	Indonesia (INA)*	0	2	0	2
15	Azerbaijan (AZE)	0	1	1	2
16	Malaysia (MAS)	0	0	3	3
17	Iraq (IRQ)	0	0	2	2
18	Iran (IRN)	0	0	1	1
18	Philippines (PHI)	0	0	1	1
18	United Arab Emirates (UAE)	0	0	1	1
Totals (20 entries)		41	41	41	123
