= 2000 Asian Athletics Championships – Women's 1500 metres =

The women's 1500 metres event at the 2000 Asian Athletics Championships was held in Jakarta, Indonesia on 30 August.

== Results ==
| Rank | Name | Nationality | Time | Notes |
|---|---|---|---|---|
| 1st place, gold medalist(s) | Wu Quingdong | China | 4:17.82 | |
| 2nd place, silver medalist(s) | Zhang Ling | China | 4:18.31 | |
| 3rd place, bronze medalist(s) | Ok Tok Sun | North Korea | 4:20.04 | |
| 4 | Geeta Manral | India | 4:27.78 | |
| 5 | Rini Budiarti | Indonesia | 4:32.16 | |
| 6 | Olivia Sadi | Indonesia | 4:46.43 | |
