= All-China Games =

Sports event in China

The All-China Games (Chinese: 全国体育大会; pinyin: Quánguó Tǐyù Dàhuì) is a quadrennial national multi-sports event for non-Olympic sports in the People's Republic of China. The events are to "give priority to promoting national physical fitness and providing lots of fun for amateur athletes".

Events include: dragon boat racing, lion dancing, shuai jiao (Chinese wrestling), trampoline, dance sports, bridge, golf, aerobics, water skiing, parachuting, body building and fitness, billiards, chess, xiangqi (Chinese chess), mountaineering and climbing, squash, orienteering, hobby craft, wireless location hunt, bowling, roller sports, open water swimming, tug of war; fin swimming, goal ball, boules, bridge, fin swimming, billiards and "Go (game)".

One of the aims is to promote sport and the whole event is dubbed a "national fitness program". So there are no medal rankings.

The Games are organised by the State General Administration of Sports (SGAS). In the past the games have not been widely publicised.

Chongqing was scheduled to hold the 5th Games 2014, but in December 2012, they were informed that the games had been canceled.

== History ==
The second All-China Games were held in 2002 in the city of Mianyang.

The third games ran 20–30 May 2006, and included 28 sports and 268 disciplines .

The 4th All-China Games, held from 16 to 26 May 2010 in Hefei City, Anhui Province, marked a major expansion in terms of the number of participants, up from 4,000 to 30,000. There was 34 sports and a new awarding system introduced. The new award system meant that 60 percent of the participants received some sort of award, instead of 3 medals per event. Hong Kong sent a team for the first time.

== Editions ==
All-China Games
| Year | Host City | Sports | Athletes |
|---|---|---|---|
| 2000 | Ningbo, Zhejiang | 17 | 2,200 |
| 2002 | Mianyang, Sichuan | 22 | – |
| 2006 | Suzhou, Jiangsu | 28 | 4,085 |
| 2010 | Hefei, Anhui | 34 | 30,000 |
| 2014 | Chongqing | 80 | |

== See also ==
- China National Youth Games
- National Games of China
- National Peasants' Games
- Sport in China
