= Luis Miguel Landa =

Spanish athlete and coach

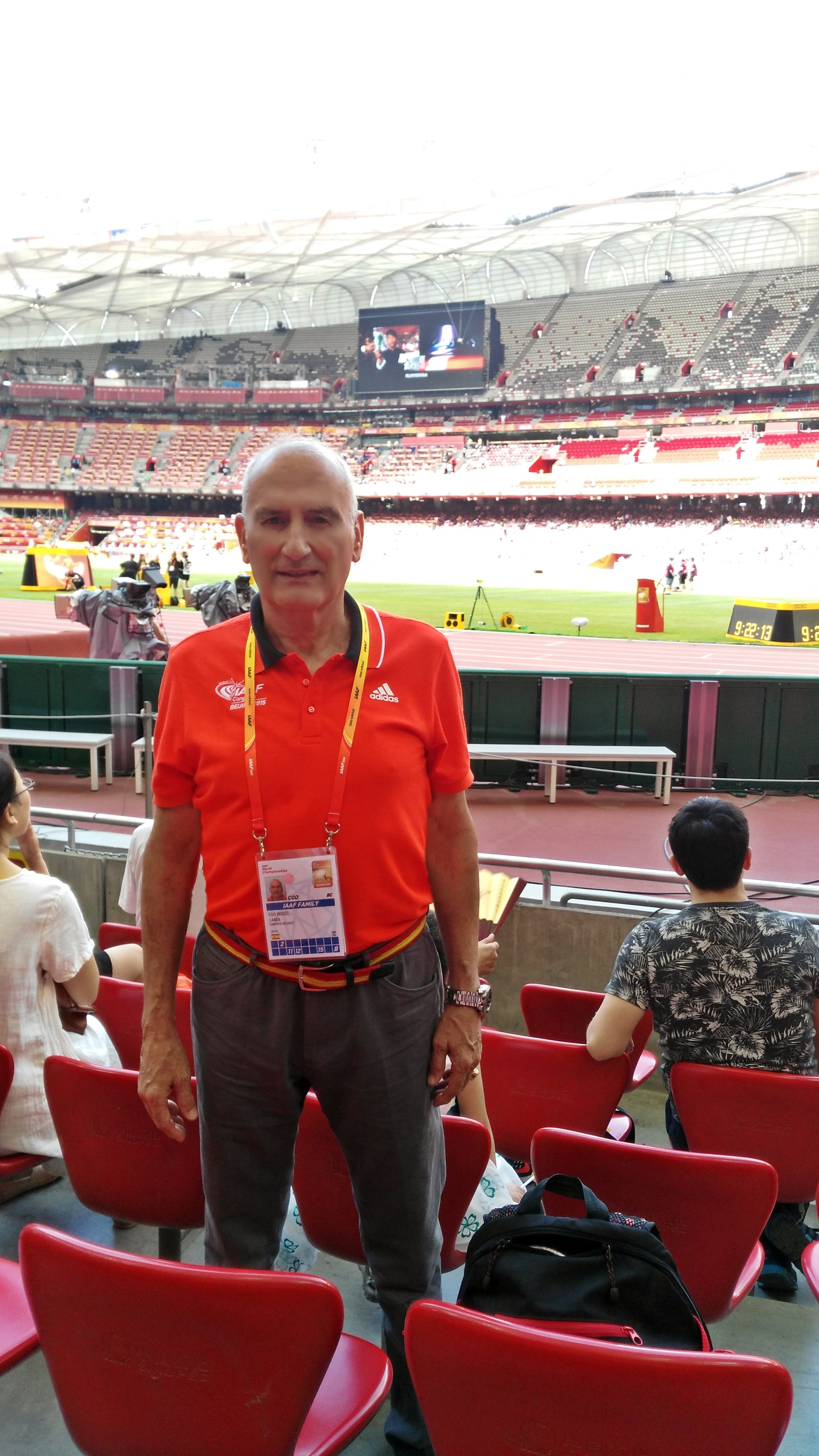

Luis Miguel Landa (born 18 Juny 1942 in Valladolid, Spain) is a Spanish athlete and coach. As a coach, he has held positions in the Spanish Ski and Athletics Federations. He has also coached Olympic and international athletes, with many of his athletes becoming Spanish national champions. In 1999, Spanish journalist José María García said he is the "father of modern Spanish Marathon".

== Personal life ==
In 2007 he married Liu Dong (Chinese World Champion 1500 m)

== Publications ==
- "Cross Country Skiing Training Systems 1" (1972)
- "Functional Anatomy of Cross Country Skiing" (1972)
- "Sense of balance training" (1974)
- "Cross Country Skiing Coach and Trainer Notes" (1977)
- "Cross Country Skiing Training Systems 2" (1982)
- "Training plans" (1986)
- "The Marathon" (1993)
- "Book of Races" (1998)
- "Endurance runner training. Middle and Long Distance" (2005)
- "Long distance training for women" (2014)
- Editorial Council Member of the Magazine "Atletismo Español".

== Bibliography ==
- El País, 03 de agosto de 2008.
- "Long distance training for women". Libros Cúpula.
