= Reawadee Srithoa =

Thai sprinter

Personal information
- Nationality: Thai
- Born: 11 August 1968 (age 57)

Sport
- Sport: Sprinting
- Event: 400 metres
Medal record
Women's athletics
Representing Thailand
Asian Championships
Gold medal – first place	1985 Jakarta	4×100 m
Silver medal – second place	1985 Jakarta	200 m
Silver medal – second place	1991 Kuala Lumpur	400 m hurdles
Silver medal – second place	1995 Jakarta	400 m hurdles
Bronze medal – third place	1991 Kuala Lumpur	4×400 m
Bronze medal – third place	1993 Manila	400 m hurdles
Bronze medal – third place	1995 Jakarta	4×100 m
Bronze medal – third place	1995 Jakarta	4×400 m
Bronze medal – third place	1998 Fukuoka	4×100 m

Reawadee Srithoa-Watanasin (born 11 August 1968) is a Thai sprinter. She competed in the women's 400 metres at the 1984 Summer Olympics.
