= National Peasants' Games =

Quadrennial multi-sport event in China

The National Peasants' Games (simplified Chinese: 中华人民共和国农民运动会; traditional Chinese: 中華人民共和國農民運動會; pinyin: Zhōnghuá Rénmín Gònghéguó Nóngmín Yùndònghuì) were a quadrennial multi-sport event in China in which competitors from among the country's 750 million rural residents take part in sports, both conventional - including basketball, athletics, table tennis, shooting, xiangqi (Chinese chess) and tai chi, and traditional rural and Chinese activities, such as wushu, dragon boat racing, lion dancing, tyre pushing, food-carrying, rice planting, kite flying, jianzi (kick shuttlecock) and tug of war. All of China's 31 provinces, autonomous regions and municipalities, as well as Taiwan, were represented. Hong Kong and Macau usually sent observer delegations.

The Games emphasised recreation more than results, according to the official Xinhua news agency, and the event was claimed to be the world's only regular sports meeting for peasants. For the government, the Games "showcased the achievements made by the Chinese people in the 30 years of the reform and opening up to the outside world," in the words of Chinese Agricultural Minister Sun Zhengcai, at the opening of the sixth event.

There was a 2016 edition planned, but the event has since been discontinued.

== History ==
The first National Peasants' Games, held in Beijing in 1988, comprised seven events, all of them conventional sports: basketball, table tennis, Chinese-style wrestling (possibly shuai jiao), athletics, cycling, shooting and football.

At the second Games, in Xiaogan in Hubei province, the alignment with 'peasant activity' began. Traditional pastimes of xiangqi (Chinese chess) and tai chi were added, while football was omitted and shooting was replaced by the 'militiaman triathlon' (shooting, grenade throwing and a five-kilometre cross-country race).

The 1996 Games, in Shanghai, introduced dragon dancing as an event, and attracted foreign media coverage.

At the fourth Games, in Mianyang in 2000, dragon boat racing, kite flying and jianzi (kick shuttlecock) were added as events.

The fifth National Peasants' Games were held in October 2004 in Yichun, in Jiangxi province, with the participation of 2,560 athletes. At the event, which dovetailed with China celebrating "the year of sports in rural areas", angling and 'rice planting' were added to the roster.

=== 2008 Games ===
The sixth Games, held in Quanzhou, in eastern Fujian Province, began on 26 October 2008 with around 3,500 competitors taking part in 15 sports and over 180 events. Entrance to all events was free to spectators.

The event involved the construction or renovation of 15 stadiums at a cost of nearly $1 billion, including a new 32,000-seat venue, the Haixia (Straits) Stadium, used for the opening and closing ceremonies.

A new event in 2008 was Yangko dance, a traditional folk dance popular in China's northern provinces.

== Editions ==
National Peasants' Games
#	Year	Host City	Sports	Athletes
1	1988	Beijing	7	–
2	1992	Xiaogan, Hubei	8	2,200
3	1996	Shanghai	9	–
4	2000	Mianyang, Sichuan	12	–
5	2004	Yichun, Jiangxi	13	2,560
6	2008	Quanzhou, Fujian	15	3,500
7	2012	Nanyang, Henan	–	–
8	2016	discontinued		

== See also ==
- All-China Games
- China National Youth Games
- National Games of China
- Sport in China
