= Sun Ripeng =

Chinese former track and field athlete (born 1974)

Medal record

Men's athletics

Representing China

Asian Games
Gold medal – first place	1994 Hiroshima	3000 m s'chase
Bronze medal – third place	1994 Hiroshima	5000 m

Sun Ripeng (Chinese: 孙日鹏; born 25 January 1974 in Zhuanghe, Liaoning province) is a Chinese former track and field athlete who specialised in the 3000 metres steeplechase. He was the gold medallist at the 1994 Asian Games. His personal best of 8:10.46 minutes is the Chinese record for the steeplechase.

He was a silver medallist at the 1993 East Asian Games and a 5000 metres bronze medallist at the Asian Games. He was a two-time winner of the National Games of China steeplechase, and also a two-time 5000 m national champion.

== Career ==
Born in Zhuanghe in China's Liaoning Province, Sun established himself in the junior category on home turf in Beijing with a steeplechase gold medal at the 1990 Asian Junior Athletics Championships, becoming the tournament's inaugural winner for that event. He returned to defend his title two years later, but ended with bronze medals in both the steeplechase and 5000 metres.

Sun's first senior honours came the following year, when he won the steeplechase title at the 7th National Games of China in a time of 8:24.97 minutes – knocking almost twenty seconds off the games record. The inaugural East Asian Games held in Shanghai that year brought him his first international medal, taking silver behind Japan's Akira Nakamura.

The peak of Sun's career was the 1994 track and field season. He began with a national title win in the 5000 m at the Chinese Athletics Championships. He was entered for both this event and his steeplechase speciality at the 1994 Asian Games. He won the bronze medal in the 5000 m, beaten by Japan's Toshinari Takaoka and Ahmed Ibrahim Warsama of Qatar by a margin of less than one second. He was the clear gold medallist in the steeplechase, setting an Asian Games record of 8:31.73 minutes – a full two seconds clear of Saudi athlete Saad Shadad Al-Asmari. This record stood until the 2002, when it was bettered by Qatar's Kenyan-born runner Khamis Seif Abdullah. It was the last major medal of Sun's international career.

Still in the under-21 category, he won the steeplechase at the Chinese City Games in 1995. He followed this with a second career victory over 5000 m at the national championships in 1996. Sun defended his steeplechase title at the 1997 National Games of China with a lifetime best performance of 8:10.46 minutes – this was (and remains) the Chinese record for the event. It is the second best time achieved in the event by an Asian-born athlete, with only Saad Al-Asmari having run faster (many East African-born athletes have run faster for Asian nations, including world record holder Saif Saaeed Shaheen). Sun's last high level appearance was at the 2001 National Games of China, where he failed to make the steeplechase final, effectively bringing a close to the 31-year-old's career.

== National titles ==
- National Games of China
  - 3000 metres steeplechase: 1993, 1997
- Chinese Athletics Championships
  - 5000 metres: 1994, 1996
- Chinese City Games
  - 3000 metres steeplechase: 1995

== International competitions ==
Year	Competition	Venue	Position	Event	Notes
1990	Asian Junior Championships	Beijing, China	1st	3000 m s'chase	8:55.68
1992	Asian Junior Championships	New Delhi, India	3rd	3000 m s'chase	9:01.38
1992	Asian Junior Championships	New Delhi, India	3rd	5000 m	14:34.2
1993	East Asian Games	Shanghai, China	2nd	3000 m s'chase	8:52.66
1994	Asian Games	Hiroshima, Japan	1st	3000 m s'chase	8:31.73
1994	Asian Games	Hiroshima, Japan	3rd	5000 m	13:40.07
