= 1990 World Junior Championships in Athletics – Women's heptathlon =

The women's heptathlon event at the 1990 World Junior Championships in Athletics was held in Plovdiv, Bulgaria, at Deveti Septemvri Stadium on 10 and 11 August.

== Medalists ==
Gold	Beatrice Mau; East Germany
Silver	Rita Ináncsi; Hungary
Bronze	Joanne Henry; New Zealand

== Results ==
=== Final ===
10/11 August

The highest mark recorded in each event is highlighted in yellow

Rank	Name	Nationality	100m H	HJ	SP	200m	LJ	JT	800m	Points	Notes
1st place, gold medalist(s)	Beatrice Mau	East Germany	13.73 (w: -0.5 m/s)	1.69	12.87	24.30 (w: 0.4 m/s)	6.32	50.14	2:19.94	6166	
2nd place, silver medalist(s)	Rita Ináncsi	Hungary	14.20 (w: -0.5 m/s)	1.78	14.02	25.17 (w: 0.8 m/s)	6.12	41.10	2:22.02	5940	
3rd place, bronze medalist(s)	Joanne Henry	New Zealand	14.81 (w: -0.5 m/s)	1.69	11.90	24.99 (w: 0.4 m/s)	6.10	39.36	2:11.57	5728	
4	Nathalie Teppe	France	13.93 (w: -0.5 m/s)	1.78	11.94	25.76 (w: 0.4 m/s)	5.52	50.74	2:27.73	5718	
5	Magalys García	Cuba	14.13 (w: -0.5 m/s)	1.57	11.74	25.40 (w: 0.8 m/s)	5.43	48.54	2:21.05	5476	
6	Zhanna Budilovskaya	Soviet Union	15.20 (w: -0.5 m/s)	1.69	11.32	25.92 (w: 0.4 m/s)	5.98	41.48	2:18.79	5456	
7	Zita Bálint	Hungary	14.23 (w: -0.5 m/s)	1.66	12.16	25.80 (w: 0.4 m/s)	5.81	39.82	2:26.80	5429	
8	Doina Negrila	Romania	14.71 (w: -0.5 m/s)	1.69	13.53	25.89 (w: 0.8 m/s)	5.85	32.44	2:21.41	5423	
9	Natalya Sergeyeva	Soviet Union	14.85 (w: -0.5 m/s)	1.72	13.63	26.78 (w: 0.8 m/s)	5.31	42.70	2:27.54	5328	
10	Francesca Delon	Italy	14.87 (w: -0.5 m/s)	1.60	11.20	25.71 (w: 0.8 m/s)	5.49	38.36	2:21.00	5169	
	Ifeoma Ozoeze	Italy	14.72 (w: -0.5 m/s)	1.69	12.89	24.58 (w: 0.4 m/s)	DNS	DNS	DNS	DNF	
	Angela Barylla	East Germany	14.81 (w: -0.5 m/s)	1.69	12.61	26.59 (w: 0.4 m/s)	DNS	DNS	DNS	DNF	
	Carolina Sanz	Chile	15.76 (w: -0.5 m/s)	1.60	9.17	27.82 (w: 0.8 m/s)	4.93	DNS	DNS	DNF	
	Rita Rosseland	Norway	14.33 (w: -0.5 m/s)	1.60	11.64	26.24 (w: 0.4 m/s)	DNS	DNS	DNS	DNF	
	Karen Zentgraf	West Germany	15.13 (w: -0.5 m/s)	1.78	DNS	DNS	DNS	DNS	DNS	DNF	

== Participation ==
According to an unofficial count, 15 athletes from 11 countries participated in the event.

- Chile (1)
- Cuba (1)
- East Germany (2)
- France (1)
- Hungary (2)
- Italy (2)
- New Zealand (1)
- Norway (1)
- Romania (1)
- Soviet Union (2)
- West Germany (1)
