= 2003 Asian Athletics Championships – Women's 5000 metres =

The women's 5000 metres event at the 2003 Asian Athletics Championships was held in Manila, Philippines on September 22.

== Results ==
Rank	Name	Nationality	Time	Notes
1st place, gold medalist(s)	Sun Yingjie	China	15:48.42	
2nd place, silver medalist(s)	Yuko Manabe	Japan	15:59.81	
3rd place, bronze medalist(s)	Hiromi Fujii	Japan	16:31.18	
4	Sujeewa Nilmini Jayasena	Sri Lanka	16:31.61	
5	Aruna Devi Laishram	India	17:31.67	SB
6	Flordeliza Cachero	Philippines	18:07.59	PB
7	Mercedita Manipol	Philippines	18:11.13	
8	Mariana Dias Ximes	Timor-Leste	19:42.53	PB
