= Angela Barylla =

German triple jumper

Angela Barylla (born 6 January 1971) is a retired German triple jumper.

She competed in heptathlon at the 1990 World Junior Championships and in triple jump at the 1994 European Indoor Championships. and the 1995 World Indoor Championships without reaching the final.

At the German championships she won silver medals in 1995 and 1996. She represented the club TV Wattenscheid. She became German indoor champion in 1995 and won three other medals between 1994 and 1998.

Her personal best jump was 13.77 metres, achieved in June 1997 in Mainz.
