= 2003 Asian Athletics Championships – Women's 10,000 metres =

The women's 10,000 metres event at the 2003 Asian Athletics Championships was held in Manila, Philippines on September 20.

== Results ==
Rank	Name	Nationality	Time	Notes
1st place, gold medalist(s)	Sun Yingjie	China	32:37.04	
2nd place, silver medalist(s)	Sujeewa Nilmini Jayasena	Sri Lanka	34:46.99	
3rd place, bronze medalist(s)	Aruna Devi Laishram	India	37:23.28	SB
4	Cristabel Martes	Philippines	38:11.62	SB
5	Mercedita Manipol	Philippines	39:03.60	
6	Flordeliza Cachero	Philippines	40:10.14	PB
