= 1988 World Junior Championships in Athletics – Women's heptathlon =

The women's heptathlon event at the 1988 World Junior Championships in Athletics was held in Sudbury, Ontario, Canada, at Laurentian University Stadium on 29 and 30 July.

== Medalists ==
Gold	Svetla Dimitrova; Bulgaria
Silver	Yelena Petushkova; Soviet Union
Bronze	Peggy Beer; East Germany

== Results ==
=== Final ===
29/30 July

The highest mark recorded in each event is highlighted in yellow

Rank	Name	Nationality	100m H	HJ	SP	200m	LJ	JT	800m	Points	Notes
1st place, gold medalist(s)	Svetla Dimitrova	Bulgaria	13.47 (w: 1.1 m/s)	1.77	13.07	23.78 (w: -1.6 m/s)	6.45	39.98	2:14.39	6289	
2nd place, silver medalist(s)	Yelena Petushkova	Soviet Union	13.55 (w: 1.1 m/s)	1.80	13.27	24.86 (w: -1.6 m/s)	5.90	41.68	2:13.29	6102	
3rd place, bronze medalist(s)	Peggy Beer	East Germany	13.65 (w: 1.1 m/s)	1.77	13.13	24.45 (w: -0.8 m/s)	6.17	38.06	2:15.02	6067	
4	Beatrice Mau	East Germany	13.98 (w: 1.5 m/s)	1.68	12.44	24.91 (w: -0.9 m/s)	6.06	47.10	2:20.94	5879	
5	Sylvia Tornow	West Germany	13.88 (w: 1.6 m/s)	1.74	13.24	25.11 (w: -0.8 m/s)	5.69	42.86	2:23.74	5769	
6	Ionica Dominiteanu	Romania	13.61	1.77	13.11	25.45	5.36	39.00	2:18.95	5702	
7	Rita Ináncsi	Hungary	14.58	1.74	12.52	25.63	5.96	44.88	2:24.05	5693	
8	Odile Lesage	France	13.86	1.86	11.75	25.62	5.58	35.94	2:24.65	5602	
9	Marcela Podracká	Czechoslovakia	14.37	1.74	11.24	25.22	5.71	32.76	2:16.87	5466	
10	Jenny Kelly	United Kingdom	14.66	1.71	13.30	25.75	5.97	35.48	2:27.99	5459	
11	Pia Gressman	Sweden	14.89	1.80	11.85	26.45	5.74	38.20	2:21.19	5454	
12	Karamfilka Petrova	Bulgaria	14.76	1.68	13.26	24.85	6.20	22.26	2:19.24	5427	
13	Ma Miaolan	China	14.73	1.71	12.45	26.55	6.00	40.90	2:30.08	5413	
14	Rita Rosseland	Norway	13.53	1.68	10.78	25.80	5.91	38.86	2:35.01	5327	
15	Marilyn Becquet	France	14.03	1.65	10.66	24.98	5.58	36.04	2:23.97	5315	
16	Peta Kennedy	Australia	15.01	1.71	11.13	25.36	5.43	31.68	2:19.91	5178	
17	Hsu Huei-Ying	Chinese Taipei	14.64	1.74	9.60	25.99	5.52	34.02	2:19.96	5177	
18	Zita Bálint	Hungary	14.47	1.62	11.38	25.96	5.59	34.82	2:26.66	5122	
19	Patricia Nadler	Switzerland	14.32	1.68	9.57	26.25	5.35	35.84	2:20.07	5108	
	Tatyana Blokhina	Soviet Union	14.38	1.77	12.18	26.24	DNS	DNS	DNS	DNF	
	Marjolyn van Elk	Netherlands	14.56	1.65	9.91	26.19	DNS	DNS	DNS	DNF	
	Ifeoma Ozoeze	Italy	14.82	1.50	DNS	DNS	DNS	DNS	DNS	DNF	
	Veronica Ávila	Dominican Republic	16.97	1.68	DNS	DNS	DNS	DNS	DNS	DNF	

== Participation ==
According to an unofficial count, 23 athletes from 18 countries participated in the event.

- Australia (1)
- Bulgaria (2)
- China (1)
- Chinese Taipei (1)
- Czechoslovakia (1)
- Dominican Republic (1)
- East Germany (2)
- France (2)
- Hungary (2)
- Italy (1)
- Netherlands (1)
- Norway (1)
- Romania (1)
- Soviet Union (2)
- Sweden (1)
- Switzerland (1)
- United Kingdom (1)
- West Germany (1)
