= Ifeoma Ozoeze =

Italian heptathlete

Personal information
- Nationality: Italian
- Born: August 13, 1971 (age 54) Brixen, Italy
- Height: 1.70 m (5 ft 7 in)
- Weight: 63 kg (139 lb)

Sport
- Country: Italy
- Sport: Athletics
- Event: Women's heptathlon
- Club: G.S. Fiamme Gialle

Achievements and titles
- Personal best: Heptathlon: 6056 (1991)

Ifeoma Ozoeze (born 13 August 1971) is an Italian former heptathlete.

== Career ==
She finished fifteenth at the 1991 World Championships and eighth at the 1992 European Indoor Championships. In 1995, Ozoeze won a scholarship to University of California, Berkeley: she won the Pac-10 Conference the same year.

== Personal life ==
Ozoeze's father is a Nigerian gynecologist, her Italian mother Silvana Collodo was the president of the Faculty of Literature and Philosophy of Padua.

Ozoeze was arrested in 2008 for extortion, and was placed in the women's prison of Venice. During her time in prison, she published a book titled "Perché".

== Achievements ==
Year	Competition	Venue	Position	Event	Notes
Representing Italy
1988	World Junior Championships	Sudbury, Canada	—	Heptathlon	DNF
1990	World Junior Championships	Plovdiv, Bulgaria	—	Heptathlon	DNF
1991	World Championships	Tokyo, Japan	8th	Heptathlon	6056 pt
1992	European Indoor Championships	Genoa, Italy	8th	Pentathlon	4137 pt

== National titles ==
Ifeoma Ozoeze has won one time the individual national championship.

- 1 win in Eptathlon (1990)

== See also ==
- Italian all-time lists - Heptathlon

== Bibliography ==
- Ozoeze, Ifeoma (2016). Perché (in Italian). Masso delle Fate. ISBN 978-8860393722.
