= China National Youth Games =

Youth multi-sport event in China

- Purpose: Multi-sport event for the under-21 athletes in the People's Republic of China
- Frequency: Every 4 years
- Inaugurated: 1988

The China National Youth Games (simplified Chinese: 中华人民共和国青年运动会; traditional Chinese: 中華人民共和國青年運動會; pinyin: Zhōnghuá Rénmín Gònghéguó Qīngnián Yùndònghuì) is a quadrennial multi-sport event for Chinese athletes under the age of twenty-one. It was first held in 1988 as the China City Games. The competition switched to be held the year before the Summer Olympics in the second edition in 1991. It has been held every four years since then and was given its current name from 2015 onwards, matching the nomenclature for the newly launched Youth Olympic Games.

The purpose of the games was to improve the performance of China's best young athletes and promote widespread involvement in sport. Teams are organised on a city or district basis – in line with the designation of Chinese cities, athletes may come from the metropolitan area or its surrounding area. There are also teams sent by national organisations, such as the People's Liberation Army Navy.

Following on from revelations of doping in China, the competition incorporated its first blood tests in the 1999 edition. This trend continued, with over 1200 out-of-competition drug tests happening as part of the 2007 City Games. One cyclist and one wushu competitor were disqualified as a result. Anti-doping educational events were also held for both athletes and coaches.

The athletics competition has provided high level performances including a women's 5000 metres world junior record by Jiang Bo in 1995, and another in the women's javelin throw by Xue Juan in 2003. It has also featured future champions in the sport, including Olympic hurdles champion Liu Xiang and world marathon champion Bai Xue.

== Editions ==
China National Youth Games
Year	Games	Hosts	Dates	Teams	Athletes	Sports	Events
1988	1	Jinan, Shandong	23 October–2 November	42	2,695	12	
1991	2	Tangshan, Hebei	September	96	~3,000	16	
1995	3	Nanjing, Jiangsu	October	50	3,344	16	
1999	4	Xi'an, Shaanxi	11–20 September	57	~4,000	16	
2003	5	Changsha, Hunan	18–27 October	57	6,648	29	289
2007	6	Wuhan, Hubei	October	57	~3,000		189
2011	7	Nanchang, Jiangxi	16–25 October	57	6,034	25	
2015	8	Fuzhou, Fujian	18–27 October	82	7,959	26	306
2019	9	Taiyuan, Shanxi	8–18 August				

== Sports ==
- Aquatics
- Archery
- Athletics
- Badminton
- Basketball
- Boxing
- Canoeing
- Cycling
- Equestrian
- Fencing
- Football
- Gymnastics
- Handball
- Hockey
- Judo
- Rowing
- Sailing
- Shooting
- Softball
- Table tennis
- Taekwondo
- Tennis
- Volleyball
- Weightlifting
- Wrestling
- Wushu

== See also ==
- All-China Games
- Asian Youth Games
- National Games of China
- National Peasants' Games
- Sport in China
- Thailand National Youth Games
