= Cao Chunying =

Chinese sprinter (born 1974)

Cao Chunying (Chinese: 曹春英; born 8 May 1974 in Zhuozhou) is a retired Chinese track and field athlete who specialized in the 400 metres event.

== Achievements ==
Year	Competition	Venue	Position	Event	Notes
1992	IAAF World Cup	Havana, Cuba	7th	800m	2:19.70
1993	7th Chinese National Games	Beijing, China	1st	4 × 400 m	3:24.28 (AR)
1994	Asian Games	Hiroshima, Japan	1st	4 × 400 m	3:29.11
1995	World Indoor Championships	Barcelona, Spain	19th (heats)	400 m	55.32
1995	World Indoor Championships	Barcelona, Spain	5th	4 × 400 m	3:39.76 (AR)
1997	8th Chinese National Games	Shanghai, China	7th	400 m	52.21
