= Liu Jing (runner) =

Chinese middle-distance runner

Medal record

Women's athletics

Representing China

Asian Championships
Gold medal – first place	1998 Fukuoka	1500 m
Silver medal – second place	1998 Fukuoka	800 m

Liu Jing (born 3 February 1971) is a retired Chinese middle distance runner who specialized in the 800 and 1500 metres.

In the 800 metres she won the silver medal at the 1998 Asian Championships. In the 1500 metres event she won the gold medal at the 1998 Asian Championships. She was qualified for the 1998 World Cup, but did not actually compete.

Her personal best 800 m time was 1.58.55 minutes, achieved in October 1997 in Shanghai. Her personal best 1500 m time was 3:57.03 minutes, achieved in the same time and place.

In September 1998, Liu was found guilty of doping during the National Championships in Beijing. She was stripped of the silver medal she had won.

== Achievements ==
Year	Competition	Venue	Position	Notes
Representing China
1998	Asian Championships	Fukuoka, Japan	1st	1500 m
1998	Asian Championships	Fukuoka, Japan	2nd	800 m
