= Nitro Athletics =

- Sport: Athletics
- Founded: 2017
- Website: Nitro Athletics.com.au

Nitro Athletics was a track and field series featuring multi-day meetings between teams of twelve athletes. The teams contained both men and women and also para-athletics competitors. There are both national and international teams. The events contested were a mix of Olympic-standard events and variations on common athletics events.

The series was created by Athletics Australia (AA). The president of the AA, Mark Arbib, stated his interest in creating a novel competition was the result of his seeing dwindling interest in traditional one-day track and field meetings, citing in particular low crowds he saw at the 2015 Sydney Track Classic. The sport's leading star, Usain Bolt, was recruited as a co-investor and performer of the series. Despite breaking from the standard setup of athletics competitions, the series was supported by Sebastian Coe, head of the International Association of Athletics Federations.

The series was hosted at Lakeside Stadium in Melbourne over three separate days (4, 9, 11 February). The six teams to feature were New Zealand, Australia, England, China, Japan and the Bolt All-Stars (a mix of athletes from the Americas and Africa). The events attracted near-capacity crowds of the 8,000 seat arena and was broadcast on live television across many of the competing nations.

Generalist media gave a positive response to the event, with the Herald Sun describing it as a "raging success". The reaction from specialist media was more mixed, however, with Athletics Weekly saying the ideas "have been tried before. Nitro Athletics has merely thrown them all into one meeting".

Athletics Australia announced that the planned 2018 series would not be held due to calendar constraints related to the Commonwealth Games being held on the Gold Coast in April.

== Events ==
- 60 metres
- 100 metres
- 150 metres
- 3-minute distance challenge relay (mixed gender)
- Elimination mile run
- 4×100 metres relay (mixed gender)
- 2×300 m relay (mixed gender)
- Distance medley relay (mixed gender)
- 110 m hurdles/100 m hurdles
- Combined-height pole vault
- Long jump (including bonus points)
- Javelin throw (including targets)
- Para-athletics 100 metres
- Para-athletics 200 metres

== See also ==
- IAAF Diamond League
