= Lang Yinglai =

Chinese middle-distance runner

Lang Yinglai (born 22 August 1979) is a female Chinese former middle-distance runner.

On 18 October 1997 at the 1997 National Games of China in Shanghai she ran the 1500 metres in 3:51.34 minutes, taking the silver medal behind Jiang Bo. This time ranks her as the fourth fastest in the world of all time, only behind Genzebe Dibaba, Qu Yunxia and Jiang. This is also the world record for junior athletes. Four days later she won the 800 metres title at the National Games in 1:57.62. She took an 800 m and 1500 m double at the 1997 Asian Junior Athletics Championships.

Lang never had a distinguished career after this, rarely competing internationally.
