= Wang Qingfen =

Chinese middle-distance runner

Medal record

Women's athletics

Representing China

Asian Championships
Bronze medal – third place	1995 Jakarta	1500 m

Wang Qingfen (born 27 March 1973) is a retired Chinese middle-distance runner who specialized in the 1500 metres.

Her personal best time was 3:58.97 minutes, achieved in October 1997 in Shanghai.

== International competitions ==
Year	Competition	Venue	Position	Notes
1995	Asian Championships	Jakarta, Indonesia	3rd	1500 m
1998	Asian Games	Bangkok, Thailand	2nd	1500 m
