= Cui Danfeng =

Chinese sprinter (born 1977)

Medal record

Women's athletics

Representing China

Asian Championships
Gold medal – first place	1995 Jakarta	100 m
Gold medal – first place	1995 Jakarta	4×100 m
Gold medal – first place	1995 Jakarta	4×400 m
Silver medal – second place	1998 Fukuoka	100 m

Cui Danfeng (born 10 January 1977) is a retired Chinese sprinter who specialized in the 100 metres.

Her personal best time is 11.20 seconds, achieved in October 1997 in Shanghai.

== Achievements ==
Year	Competition	Venue	Result	Extra
1995	Asian Championships	Jakarta, Indonesia	1st	100 m
1997	National Games of China	Shanghai, China	8th	100m
1997	National Games of China	Shanghai, China	1st	4 × 400 m
1998	Asian Championships	Fukuoka, Japan	2nd	100 m
