= Wang Junxia =

Chinese long-distance runner

Personal information
- Nationality: Chinese
- Born: 9 January 1973 (age 53) Jiaohe, Jilin City, China
- Height: 162 cm (5 ft 4 in)
- Weight: 50 kg (110 lb)

Sport
- Sport: Track and Field
- Events: 1500 metres, 3000 metres, 5000 metres, 10000 metres, Marathon

Achievements and titles
- Personal bests: 1500 metres: 3:51.92; 3000 metres: 8:06.11 WR; 5000 metres: 14:51.87; 10000 metres: 29:31.78; Marathon: 2:24:07
Medal record
Women's athletics
Representing China
Olympic Games
Gold medal – first place	1996 Atlanta	5000 m
Silver medal – second place	1996 Atlanta	10,000 m
World Championships
Gold medal – first place	1993 Stuttgart	10,000 m
Asian Games
Gold medal – first place	1994 Hiroshima	10,000 m
Asian Championships
Gold medal – first place	1993 Manila	10,000 m
Gold medal – first place	1995 Jakarta	5000 m
Gold medal – first place	1995 Jakarta	10,000 m
World Junior Championships
Gold medal – first place	1992 Seoul	10,000 m

Wang Junxia (simplified Chinese: 王军霞; traditional Chinese: 王軍霞; pinyin: Wáng Jūnxiá; born 9 January 1973) is a Chinese former long-distance runner who is the current world record holder at 3,000 meters. She also held the world record for the 10,000 meters for 23 years, between 1993 and 2016, which is a record in itself. Her best years were from 1991 to 1996. Wang was coached by Ma Junren until 1995 and by Mao Dezhen from 1995 to her retirement after the 1996 Atlanta Olympics.

== Early years ==
Born in Jiaohe, Jilin, Wang beat Ethiopian Gete Wami to win the 1992 World Junior Championships in Athletics in 10,000 m (32:29.90) in Seoul, South Korea.

== 1993: Record-setting year ==
In April 1993, Wang set a world-leading time and former Asian best in marathon (2:24:07). In May, she broke the Asian record of 3000 m in a fast time of 8:27.68 in the Chinese National Championships. In August, Chinese women distance runners under coach Ma Junren stunned the world and swept the world titles from 1500 m to 10,000 m in Stuttgart, Germany. Wang claimed the world title in 10,000 m (30:49.30), although she was sick before the race. In less than a month, she went on to win the 3000 m and 10,000 m in the Chinese National Games with three world records in three races.

On 8 September 1993, she won the 10,000 m final in a world record of 29:31.78, which bettered the former record by 42 seconds and was also the first-ever sub-30 minute performance in this event. The 10,000 record would remain on the books as the world record until the 2016 Olympics when it was smashed by Ethiopian Almaz Ayana.

On 11 September, she finished second in 1500 m behind her teammate, Qu Yunxia in another world record breaking race. Qu ran 3:50.46 (world record at the time) against Wang's 3:51.92. Four years later, Bo Jiang and Yinglai Lang ran slightly faster than Wang in the same race. Qu's record remained on the books until it was finally beaten by Genzebe Dibaba of Ethiopia when she ran 3:50.07 at the Herculis meet in Monaco on 15 July 2015. Wang is currently fifth on the all-time list.

In 3000 m heats on 12 September, Wang's teammates broke the 3000 m world record in the first heat. This world record was just briefly held, when it was erased by Wang in the second heat. The next day she claimed the 3000 m in another record time 8:06.11. She also won the World Cup Marathon Championships later in the year.

In 1994, she was awarded the Jesse Owens prize on the remarkable performances in 1993. She was the first and only Chinese and Asian person to win the prize. Although she won the Asian Games in 10,000 m with a world-leading time (30:50.34) later in the year in Hiroshima, her world-record breaking form was obviously gone.

In 1995, Wang and her teammates broke up with their coach Ma due to prize money and his harsh coaching style. After a short period of training on their own without a major success, Wang started to train under coach Mao Dezhen to prepare for the 1996 Olympics. In Nanjing, she announced a comeback in the Olympics Trials, where she ran quality times in both 5000 m and 10,000 m.

== 1996 Olympics ==
At the 1996 Summer Olympics, Wang won the new Olympic event, women's 5000 m (14:59.88) and a silver in the 10,000 m (31:02.58) just a second behind Portuguese Fernanda Ribeiro. Ribeiro made a heroic final lap kick that surprised Wang and perhaps because she was not used to being challenged, she was unable to react to it. In fact, not only did both women's performances better the previous Olympic record in the 10,000 m, they ran it in such high temperatures that officials were handing out cups of water in the middle of the race, like a marathon. She retired after the Olympics and married Zhan Yu.

== After retirement and controversy ==
The Guardian reported in 2001 that Wang was living anonymously in Beijing. In 2008 Wang and her husband Huang Tianwen moved to Denver, Colorado. In 2012, she told the Spanish newspaper El Pais that she was writing her autobiography.

The International Association of Athletics Federations (IAAF) listed Wang in its Hall of Fame. Wang was the only Chinese athlete to repeat her 1993 successes at the 1996 Olympics, under Coach Ma, though Qu had managed a bronze medal at the 1992 Olympics. However, there were doping allegations about her 1993 performances. Yuan Weimin, former Director General of the State General Administration of Sports and Chairperson of the Chinese Olympic Committee, had confirmed in 2009 in his book that six athletes coached by her former coach Ma Junren were dropped from the 2000 Summer Olympics because they were tested positive for doping. Coach Ma was also fired from the Chinese national team in 2000. During the 2012 Summer Olympics, a journalist even lumped Wang and compatriot Qu Yunxia into a group of so-called "chemical sisters".

On 3 February 2016, Tencent Sports exclusively published a March 1995 letter reportedly from Wang and nine other athletes under Ma's tutelage. In it, they alleged Coach Ma forced them to dope. Zhao Yu, the investigative author who had received the letter, said Wang and others came forward because Coach Ma had told them to take personal responsibilities, should they get caught. The letter was initially published in 2015 in Zhao's book, but only gained traction in February 2016. The story raised suspicion over the legitimacy of Wang's world records. The IAAF confirmed it had reached out to the Chinese Athletics Association for verification and would investigate, but the latter has yet to respond. The IAAF was expected to discuss a proposal to wipe all pre-2005 world records in August 2017, due to it having only stored blood and urine samples since 2005.

In May 2025, Beatrice Chebet ran 8:11.56 for 3000 metres, falling 5.45 seconds short of Junxia's officially recognized 8:06.11 world record. Given the controversy surrounding Wang's world record, some organizations outside of World Athletics, such as Track and Field News, do not recognize it.

== See also ==
- Athletics at the 1996 Summer Olympics
- List of world records in athletics
- China at the World Championships in Athletics

Records
Preceded by Ingrid Kristiansen	Women's 10,000 m World Record Holder; 8 September 1993 – 12 August 2016	Succeeded by Almaz Ayana
Preceded by Zhang Linli	Women's 3000 m World Record Holder; 12 September 1993 –	Succeeded by Incumbent
Awards
Preceded by Monica Seles	United Press International; Athlete of the Year; 1993	Succeeded by Le Jingyi
Preceded by Heike Drechsler	Women's Track & Field Athlete of the Year; 1993	Succeeded by (United States) Jackie Joyner-Kersee
Sporting positions
Preceded by Yelena Romanova	Women's 3000 m Best Year Performance; 1993	Succeeded by Sonia O'Sullivan
