= Zhang Jian (runner) =

Chinese middle-distance runner (born 1976)

Personal information
- Born: 5 April 1976 (age 50)
Medal record
Women's athletics
Representing China
Asian Championships
Gold medal – first place	1998 Fukuoka	800 m
Silver medal – second place	1995 Jakarta	1500 m

Zhang Jian (Chinese: 张健; pinyin: Zhāng Jiàn; born 5 April 1976) is a Chinese retired middle distance runner who specialized in the 800 metres. She participated at the 1996 Summer Olympics.

Her personal best time was 1.58.98 minutes, achieved in October 1997 in Shanghai.

== Achievements ==
Year	Competition	Venue	Position	Notes
Representing China
1995	Asian Championships	Jakarta, Indonesia	2nd	1500 m
1997	East Asian Games	Busan, South Korea	1st	800 m
1998	Asian Championships	Fukuoka, Japan	1st	800 m
1998	World Cup	Madrid, Spain	6th	800 m
