= 1997 National Games of China =

Multi-sport event in Shanghai, China

8th National Games of the People's Republic of China
- Host city: Shanghai
- Country: China
- Opening: 12 October 1997
- Closing: 24 October 1997
- Opened by: Jiang Zemin (CCP General Secretary & President)
- Main venue: Shanghai Stadium

The Eighth National Games of the People’s Republic of China was held in Shanghai from October 12 to 24, 1997. The participating delegations included 46 delegations from all provinces, autonomous regions, municipalities directly under the Central Government, the People’s Liberation Army, and 13 trade associations. It was the first time that the SAR Hong Kong and the Chongqing Municipality have organized a team to participate in the National Games.

== Events ==
There were 28 major events in the competition, with a total of 319 minor events

- Aquatics
  - Diving
  - Swimming
  - Synchronized swimming
  - Water polo
- Archery
- Athletics
- Badminton
- Baseball
- Basketball
- Beach volleyball
- Boxing
- Canoeing
- Cycling
- Equestrian
- Fencing
- Football
- Gymnastics
  - Artistic gymnastics
  - Rhythmic gymnastics
- Handball
- Hockey
- Judo
- Modern pentathlon
- Rowing
- Sailing
  - Sailing
  - Windsurfing
- Shooting
- Skating
  - Short speed skating
  - Long speed skating
- Softball
- Table tennis
- Tennis
- Volleyball
- Weightlifting
- Wrestling
- Wushu
- Yachting

== Medal table ==
Rank	Delegation	Gold	Silver	Bronze
1	Shanghai	42	34	32
2	Liaoning	39.5	43.5	29.5
3	Shandong	25	22	25
4	Guangdong	24.5	31.5	37.5
4	People's Liberation Army	24.5	25.5	24.5
5	Jiangsu	23.0	15.0	24.0
6	Beijing	20.0	33.0	12.5
7	Jilin	19.0	9.5	6.0
8	Hunan	17.5	10.0	13.5
9	Zhejiang	17.0	10.0	7.5
10	Henan	14.5	11.0	20.0
11	Sichuan	12.5	20.5	18.0
12	Guangxi	12.5	11.0	7.5
13	Hubei	12.5	10.5	9.0
14	Heilongjiang	9.5	11.0	8.0
15	Inner Mongolia	9.5	9.0	9.0
16	Shanxi	8.0	7.0	8.0
17	Jiangxi	8.0	4.0	3.0
18	Hebei	6.5	5.5	17.5
19	Tianjin	5.5	10.0	8.0
20	Anhui	5.5	4.5	10.0
21	Fujian	5.0	8.0	8.0
22	Gansu	4.0	4.5	6.0
23	Xinjiang	3.0	3.0	5.0
24	Guizhou	2.5	3.0	3.5
25	Locomotive	2.0	1.0	3.0
26	Hong Kong	2.0	0	0
27	Shaanxi	1.5	6.5	1.0
28	Vanguard	1.0	5.0	3.0
29	Yunnan	1.0	3.5	5.0
30	Tibet	1.0	0	0
31	Qinghai	0.5	2.0	0
32	Chongqing	0	2.5	2.5
32	Finance	0	1.0	0
33	Hainan	0	0	2.0
34	Ningxia	0	0	1.0
35	Water	0	0	1.0
