= Li Xuemei =

Chinese sprinter (born 1977)

Personal information
- Nationality: China
- Born: 1 February 1977 (age 49) Guanghan, Sichuan, China
- Height: 1.73 m (5 ft 8 in)
- Weight: 56 kg (123 lb)

Sport
- Sport: Athletics
- Events: 100 metres, 200 metres
- Coached by: Zhang Rongwei
Medal record
Women's athletics
Representing China
Asian Games
Gold medal – first place	1998 Bangkok	100 m
Silver medal – second place	1998 Bangkok	200 m
Gold medal – first place	1998 Bangkok	4 × 100 metres relay

Li Xuemei (Chinese: 李雪梅; pinyin: Lǐ Xuěméi; born 1 February 1977) is a Chinese retired sprinter. She is the fastest Asian woman in history with a personal best time of 10.79 in the 100 m and a 22.01 in the 200 m, both ran during the National Games of China.

== Early years ==
Coming from a modest family, she started practising athletics in 1988 at the Guanghan Amateur Sports School.

At the age of 18, Li easily won the 100 m (11.36) and the 200 m (22.93, national junior record) at the Chinese City Games, a quadrennial competition for athletes under 21.

One year later, she took part to the World Junior Championships in both events and was eliminated in the first round.

== World Championships and 1997 National Games of China ==
In June 1997, during the Chinese Championships held in Chengdu, Li broke the Chinese record on 100 m in 11.05 s and won the 200 m in 22.60 s, setting a new personal best in the process. She was part of the Sichuan 4 × 100 m team which broke the Chinese record in 43.13 seconds.

She was selected for the World Championships in August, where she was eliminated in the second round both on 100 and 200 m. However, she broke Chen Zhaojing's Asian record in the 200 m heats, clocking a strong 22.44 s. Together with Pei Fang, Yan Jiankui and Liu Xiaomei, they managed to reach the 4 × 100 m final, where they finished eighth and last.

Two months later, Li participated to the National Games of China in Shanghai, representing Sichuan. On the 100 m event, she won her heat in 10.90 s, breaking her own Asian and national record. She crossed the line in 11.03 s to qualify for the final, beating the Guangxi experimented sprinter Tian Yumei and one of Sichuan's top runner Li Yali, who both set new personal bests.

In a terrific final, she once again smashed her record in 10.79 s to take the gold medal. This astonishing time ranked her second behind Marion Jones in 1997. Her teammate Liu Xiaomei finished second in 10.89 s and Tian Yumei completed the podium in 11.06 s.

Four days later, Li made it to the top again, winning the 200 m final in 22.01s, shattering her own Asian record. Liu Xiaomei finished again second of the race in 22.36 s while 1995 World Student 200 m champion Du Xiujie finished third in 22.56.

Quartet composed of Xiao Lin, Li Yali, Liu Xiaomei and Li Xuemei won the 4 × 100 m relay in 42.23 s, showing Sichuan's supremacy in women sprinting events.

In 1998, Li ran a 10.95 s in Beijing and competed in European meetings, such as Rome's Golden Gala, Oslo's Bislett Games and also participated to the Goodwill Games, where she finished last in the 100 m event. Her best performance of the year was a gold medal on 100 m at the Asian Games where she also took the silver medal on the 200 m, won by Damayanthi Darsha.

== Mixed results ==
Li participated to the World Indoor Championships on the 60 m event, where she failed to advance to the second round. She almost did not compete during the 1999 outdoor season, as she only ran a 100 m in a Hong Kong meeting in July. She won the race in 11.46 s, far from her 1997 results.

2000, Olympic year, saw mixed results from Li. She just set a season best of 11.25 s on 100 m, achieved during the Olympics, where she was knocked out in the second round. She was part of the Chinese 4 × 100 m team, composed of Zeng Xiujun, junior Qin Wangping and Liu Xiaomei, which qualified for the final, where the team finished last in a poor result because of a last disastrous baton exchange between Qin and Li.

The 2001 season was better; Li took part to the World Indoor Championships, where she set a new area record on 60 m in the semi-finals, clocking a time of 7.19 s that still stands today. She finished seventh of the final in 7.20 s.

In May, she took the silver medal at the East Asian Games on 100 m eventually won by her teammate Zeng Xiujun.

In August, Li won the 200 m at the World Student Games in 22.86 s, beating Belgium star Kim Gevaert and Belarus Natalia Safronnikava. China's 4 × 100 m team composed of Li, Chen Yueqin, Yan Jiankui and Zeng Xiujun dominated the final to beat Brazil and France which respectively won silver and bronze.

Three months later, the National Games of China, held in Guangzhou were Li's great season conclusion. In the 100 and 200 m events, the first two places replicated the 1997 races: Li won the gold medals in 11.14 s and 22.75 s and Liu Xiaomei silver in 11.22 s and 23.15 s; both recording seasonal bests. Chen Yueqin from Hainan took the bronze in the 100 m event and Chen Yuxiang did the same on 200 m. Sichuan 4 × 100 m team, anchored by Li, won the final in 43.18 s.

== Injuries and comeback ==
Li did not compete in 2002 and 2003. The Guangzhou National Games remained her last competitive effort. Since 1997, she has struggled with injuries and it took a long time for regaining her form.

She came back in 2004, where she won the 100 and 200 m events of the Chinese Championships held in Shijiazhuang in May. Even though the Chinese Athletics Federation was reluctant to send her to the Olympics because of her mixed results she achieved that year; she was selected, but only on 100 m. She finished seventh of her heat in the first round in a mediocre time of 12.21 s and could not advance to the second round.

In March 2005, Li finished third of the 60 m event of the annual traditional China vs Japan meeting, clocking a 7.47 s. The same year, she took part to the Chinese Championships on 100 m where she was eliminated in the first round.

Li's last competition of the year was the National Games of China in Nanjing. She was not in shape to face China's rising stars and could not defend her 1997 and 2001 titles on 100 m, 200 m and 4 × 100 m. Only participating individually in the 100 m event, she finished third of her heat in the first round, setting a seasonal best of 11.72 s. In the semi-finals, Li finished eighth and last of her heat, crossing the line in a disappointing time of 11.98 s.

Together with Leng Mei, Shu Yan and Zeng Xiujun, Li finished fourth of the 4 × 100 m final in 44.93 s.

Li Xuemei retired in February 2006, unhappy of her last results and disturbed by injuries. Nowadays, she still remains the fastest Asian woman in history.

== Achievements ==
Year	Competition	Venue	Position	Event	Notes
Representing China
1995	Chinese City Games	Nanjing, China	1st	100 m	11.36
1995	Chinese City Games	Nanjing, China	1st	200 m	22.93
1996	World Junior Championships	Sydney, Australia	40th (h)	100 m	12.43
1996	World Junior Championships	Sydney, Australia	37th (h)	200 m	25.03
1997	World Athletics Championships	Athens, Greece	18th (qf)	100 m	11.36
1997	World Athletics Championships	Athens, Greece	18th (qf)	200 m	23.06
1997	World Athletics Championships	Athens, Greece	8th	4 × 100 m relay	43.32
1997	National Games of China	Shanghai, China	1st	100 m	10.79 (AR)
1997	National Games of China	Shanghai, China	1st	200 m	22.01 (AR)
1997	National Games of China	Shanghai, China	1st	4 × 100 m relay	42.23 (AR)
1997	National Games of China	Shanghai, China	3rd	4 × 400 m relay	3.30.17
1998	Asian Games	Bangkok, Thailand	1st	100 m	11.05w
1998	Asian Games	Bangkok, Thailand	2nd	200 m	22.53
1998	Asian Games	Bangkok, Thailand	1st	4 × 100 m relay	43.36
1999	World Indoor Championships	Maebashi, Japan	17th (h)	60 m	7.32
2000	Summer Olympics	Sydney, Australia	21st (qf)	100 m	11.46
2000	Summer Olympics	Sydney, Australia	8th	4 × 100 m relay	44.87
2001	World Indoor Championships	Lisbon, Portugal	7th	60 m	7.20
2001	East Asian Games	Osaka, Japan	2nd	100 m	11.58
2001	East Asian Games	Osaka, Japan	1st	4 × 100 m relay	44.08 (GR)
2001	World Student Games	Beijing, China	1st	200 m	22.86
2001	World Student Games	Beijing, China	1st	4 × 100 m relay	43.72
2001	National Games of China	Guangzhou, China	1st	100 m	11.14
2001	National Games of China	Guangzhou, China	1st	200 m	22.75
2001	National Games of China	Guangzhou, China	1st	4 × 100 m relay	43.18
2004	Summer Olympics	Athens, Greece	49th (h)	100 m	12.21
2005	National Games of China	Nanjing, China	semi-finals	100 m	11.98
2005	National Games of China	Nanjing, China	4th	4 × 100 m relay	44.93
