= Liu Dong =

Chinese middle-distance runner

Liu Dong (Chinese: 刘东; born 27 December 1973) is a Chinese retired middle-distance runner. She holds the current Asian record over 800 metres with 1:55.54. She set that record while winning at the 7th Chinese National Games. Her personal best over 1500 metres was 3:56.31. She was trained from 1991 to 1993 by Ma Junren in Liaoning Province.

== Life and career ==
Liu Dong was born on 27 December 1973 in Jinzhou. She is married to Spanish coach Luis Miguel Landa and lives in Spain. She competed at the 2014 Cross della Vallagarina and placed 15th.

Liu acted as a rabbit for the famous 1500 at the 1993 Chinese National Games, where Qu Yunxia set the world record that stood for almost 22 years. When Liu set her personal best in the same race four years later, it was the #15 mark of all time. Only 5 non-Chinese women had ever run faster, the others on the list being the Chinese women who had beaten Liu in those two races.

== International competitions ==
Year	Competition	Venue	Position	Event	Notes
Representing China
1992	World Junior Championships	Seoul, South Korea	1st	1500 m	4:05.14 CR
1993	World Championships	Stuttgart, Germany	1st	1500 m	4:00.50
1993	East Asian Games	Shanghai, China	2nd	1500 m	4:07.25

== Honors and awards ==
- Special Prize of the XXXV Career of Science of the Superior Council of Scientific Research. "By their professional values", Madrid (ESP) 2015.
- Prize "As Image for the World in Sport and Culture" of "The World Sport and Culture Exchange Communication Festival", Beijing (CHI) 2016.

== Publications ==
"Long distance training for women". Libros Cúpula

== See also ==
- China at the World Championships in Athletics
