= Lee Mi-gyeong (athlete) =

South Korean long-distance runner

Personal information
- Nationality: South Korean
- Born: 26 May 1975 (age 51)

Sport
- Sport: Long-distance running
- Event: Marathon

Lee Mi-gyeong (born 26 May 1975) is a South Korean long-distance runner. She competed in the women's marathon at the 1996 Summer Olympics.
