= Liu Xiaomei (athlete) =

Chinese sprinter (born 1972)

Personal information
- Nationality: China
- Born: 11 January 1972 (age 54) Neijiang, Sichuan
- Height: 1.68 m (5 ft 6 in)
- Weight: 53 kg (117 lb)

Sport
- Sport: Athletics
- Event(s): 100 metres, 200 metres
- Coached by: Zhang Rongwei
Medal record
Women's athletics
Representing China
Asian Championships
Gold medal – first place	1993 Manila	4×100 m
Silver medal – second place	1993 Manila	100 m

Liu Xiaomei (born 11 January 1972 in Neijiang) is a former Chinese track and field athlete who specialised in sprinting. After entering the Sichuan Track and Field Team in 1986, She competed in the women's 4 × 100 metres relay at the 2000 Summer Olympics.

She is the current Asian record holder in the 4 x 100 metres relay with a time of 42.23 seconds, achieved in October 1997 with Xiao Lin, Li Yali and Li Xuemei.

== Personal bests ==
Event	Time	Venue	Date
100 m	10.89 s	Shanghai, China	18 October 1997
200 m	22.36 s	Shanghai, China	22 October 1997
400 m	53.01 s		1993
4 × 100 m	42.23 s	Shanghai, China	23 October 1997
