= Ma Miaolan =

Chinese heptathlete (born 1970)

Medal record

Women's athletics

Representing China

Asian Championships
Silver medal – second place	1987 Singapore	Heptathlon
Silver medal – second place	1989 New Delhi	Heptathlon

Ma Miaolan (Chinese: 马苗兰; born January 18, 1970) is a retired Chinese heptathlete. On August 9, 1993 in Beijing, she set the Chinese record with a score of 6750 points. Her achievements in sport earned her the nickname "Asia's Iron Woman" (亚洲女铁人). A native of Dongyang, Zhejiang, after her retirement she married table tennis athlete Chen Jian (陈健). As of 2008, the couple lived in Jinhua, and have one son (born c. 1994).

== Achievements ==
Year	Competition	Venue	Position	Event	Notes
Representing China
1987	Asian Championships	Singapore	2nd	Heptathlon	5460 pts
1988	World Junior Championships	Sudbury, Canada	13th	Heptathlon	5413 pts
1989	Asian Championships	New Delhi, India	2nd	Heptathlon	6021 pts
1990	Asian Games	Beijing, PR China	1st	Heptathlon	6231 pts
