= Dong Yanmei =

Chinese long-distance runner

Dong Yanmei (born 16 February 1977 in Dalian, Liaoning Province) is a Chinese long-distance runner who specialized in the 5000 metres. She has not competed on the top level since 2002.

== Achievements ==
Year	Competition	Venue	Position	Event	Notes
Representing China
1998	Goodwill Games	Uniondale, United States	3rd	10,000 m	
2001	World Indoor Championships	Lisbon, Portugal	5th	3000 m	
2001	World Championships	Edmonton, Canada	4th	5000 m	
2001	Universiade	Beijing, China	1st	5000 m	
2001	Universiade	Beijing, China	1st	10,000 m	
2001	East Asian Games	Osaka, Japan	1st	5000 m	
2001	East Asian Games	Osaka, Japan	1st	10,000 m	

=== Personal bests ===
- 1500 metres - 3:55.07 min (1997)
- 3000 metres - 8:33.07 min (2000)
- 5000 metres - 14:29.82 min (1997)
- 10,000 metres - 30:38.09 min (1997)
