= Ma Junren =

Chinese track coach

Ma Junren (simplified Chinese: 马俊仁; traditional Chinese: 馬俊仁; pinyin: Mǎ Jùnrén; born 28 October 1944) is a Chinese track coach. He trained several world-class middle and long distance female runners including Wang Junxia and Qu Yunxia, who hold several world records. He and his pupils were also called the Ma family army (馬家軍) for their stunning performance in domestic and international events.

Starting as a track coach in a remote rural middle school, he adopted a systematic, allegedly scientific training strategy, which includes encouragement, nutritional tonics using Traditional Chinese medicine and track training balancing stamina and speed.

There have been suggestions that he has employed performance-enhancing drugs as part of his training regime. He has strongly denied this, although six of his athletes were among 27 competitors dropped from China's team for the Sydney Olympic games after failing blood tests. As a result, he was dropped as a coach from the Chinese Olympic team. Following this episode, he and his entire team of athletes disappeared for several months, fueling further suspicion.

His training regimes were reputed to be extremely rigorous, involving extremely high mileage (in excess of a marathon per day) and run at high altitude.

Ma is also controversial for his temper tantrums. He has admitted to physically beating his athletes on occasion. His original squad fired him for many reasons, including the late allocation of sports bonuses.

Ma retired as deputy director of the Liaoning Provincial Sports Bureau on 1 December 2004. He is recently interested in fostering world-class mastiffs.

== Allegations of doping & IAAF investigation ==
News Reports surfaced February 2016 of a Chinese journalist who claimed 10 of the country's Olympic champions and world record holders have said they were part of a state-sponsored doping program, in a letter apparently from Wang Junxia, with nine other signatories, that alleged that the athletes had been forced to take drugs. Report initially surfaced via Tencent Sports and Sohu Sports and reported by China Central Television (CCTV) and throughout Chinese state media.

International Association of Athletics Federations (IAAF) subsequently opened investigation into the allegations.
