= Jiang Bo (runner) =

Chinese middle-distance runner

Jiang Bo (Chinese: 姜波; born March 13, 1977, in Wafangdian, Liaoning Province) is a female Chinese middle-distance runner. On October 18, 1997, in Shanghai she ran the 1500 metres in 3:50.98 minutes. This ranks her fourth in the world of all time, behind world record holder Faith Kipyegon, Genzebe Dibaba, and compatriot Qu Yunxia.

Jiang was born on March 13, 1977, in Wafangdian. In 1990, she attended Dalian Sports School (Chinese: 大连体校), where she was coached by Zhang Fuxin (Chinese: 张福新). Ma Junren began coaching her in 1994.

Sporting positions
Preceded by (Portugal) Fernanda Ribeiro	Women's 5000m Best Year Performance; 1997	Succeeded by (Romania) Gabriela Szabo
