= Qu Yunxia =

Chinese middle-distance runner

Personal information
- Born: 25 December 1972 (age 53) Dalian, China
Medal record
Women's athletics
Representing China
Olympic Games
Bronze medal – third place	1992 Barcelona	1500 m
World Championships
Gold medal – first place	1993 Stuttgart	3000 m
Asian Championships
Gold medal – first place	1991 Kuala Lumpur	800 m
Gold medal – first place	1991 Kuala Lumpur	1500 m
Gold medal – first place	1993 Manila	3000 m
Silver medal – second place	1991 Kuala Lumpur	4×400 m
World Junior Championships
Gold medal – first place	1990 Plovdiv	1500 m
Summer Universiade
Bronze medal – third place	1991 Sheffield	1500 m

Qu Yunxia (simplified Chinese: 曲云霞; traditional Chinese: 曲雲霞; pinyin: Qǔ Yúnxiá; born 25 December 1972) is a Chinese Olympic athlete who specialised in the 1500 metres.

At the 1992 Summer Olympics in Barcelona, she won a bronze medal in 1500 m.

On 11 September 1993, she set the world record in the 1,500 metres at 3:50.46 minutes while running in the National Games of China in Beijing. The record stood 22 years, until broken on 17 July 2015, by Genzebe Dibaba who was the only non-Chinese athlete to seriously challenge the mark during that period.

She won the 3000 metres at the 1993 World Championships in Athletics, setting what will likely be the permanent Championship Record in the event due to women switching to the 5,000 metres distance beginning in 1995.

== See also ==
- China at the World Championships in Athletics

Records
Preceded by Tatyana Kazankina	Women's 1500 m World Record Holder; September 11, 1993 — July 17, 2015	Succeeded by Genzebe Dibaba
