= High jump at the World Athletics Championships =

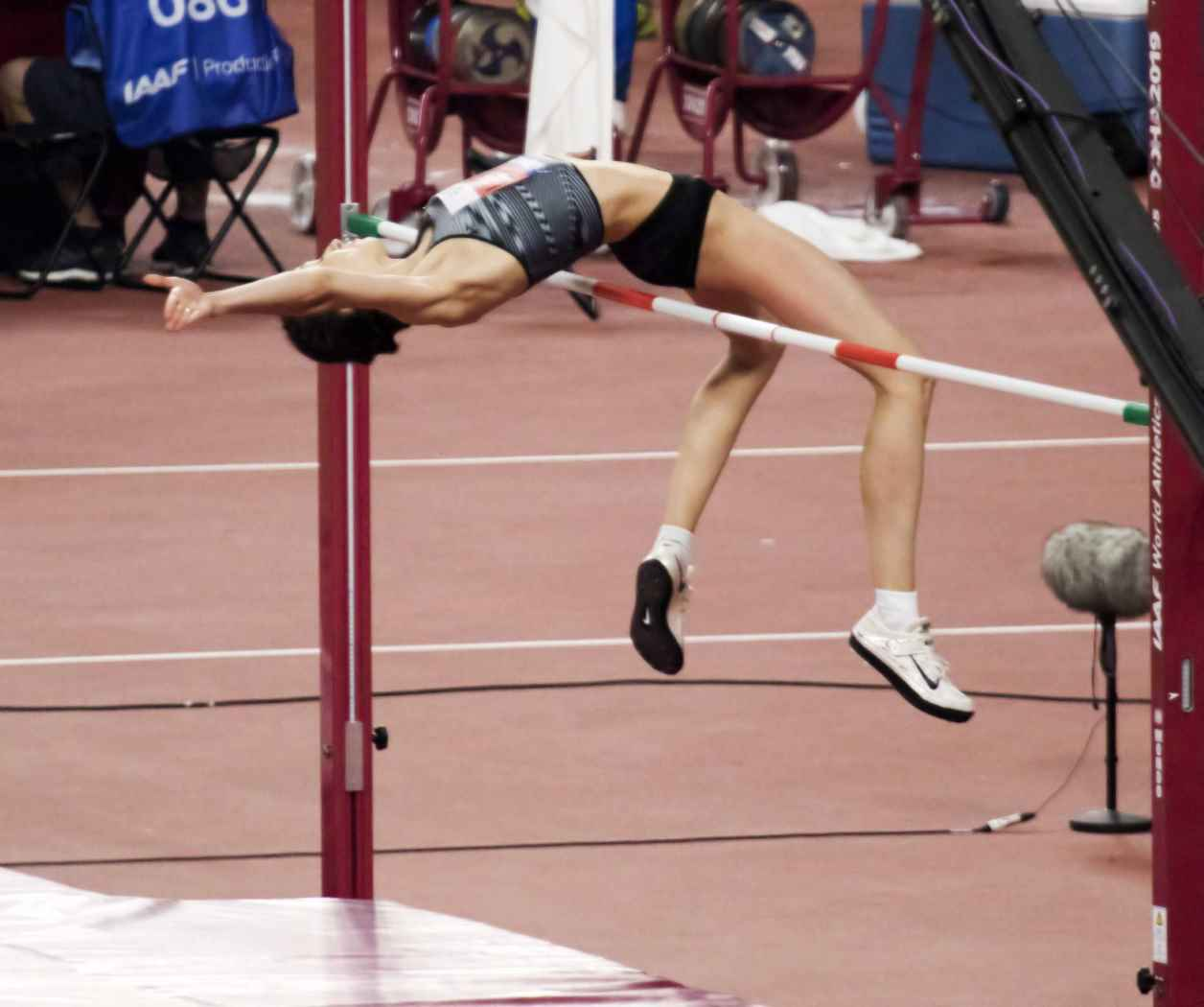
- Mariya Lasitskene competing in the 2019 final.

Overview
- Gender: Men and women
- Years held: Men: 1983 – 2025; Women: 1983 – 2025

Championship record
- Men: 2.41 m Bohdan Bondarenko (2013)
- Women: 2.09 m Stefka Kostadinova (1987)

Reigning champion
- Men: Hamish Kerr (NZL)
- Women: Nicola Olyslagers (AUS)

The high jump at the World Championships in Athletics has been contested by both men and women since the inaugural edition in 1983. The competition format typically has one qualifying round contested by two groups of athletes, with all those clearing the qualifying height or placing in top twelve advancing to the final round.

Russia is the most successful nation in the event, winning 14 medals in total, 4 of them gold. Additionally, they have also won 5 medals as the Authorized Neutral Athletes. Ukraine is the second-most successful nation, winning a total of 12 medals, including 4 golds. Cuba, Germany and Sweden are the only other countries that have won gold in both the men's event and the women's event.

Mutaz Barsham is the most successful athlete in the event, having won a total of 5 medals: 3 gold medals and 2 bronze medals between 2013 and 2023. Russian high jumper Mariya Lasitskene is the most successful female athlete and the other only athlete to win more than 2 gold medals, winning 3 gold medals in a row between 2015 and 2019. Inha Babakova is the only other athlete aside from Barsham that has won more than 4 medals. 4 other athletes have won more than 3 medals: Yaroslav Rybakov and Javier Sotomayor on the men's side, and Blanka Vlašić and Anna Chicherova on the women's side.

The championship records for the event are 2.41 m for men, set by Bohdan Bondarenko in 2013, and 2.09 m for women, set by Stefka Kostadinova in 1987. Additionally, Kostadinova's championship record jump of 2.09 m was also the only time the world record has been broken at the World Athletics Championships.

== Age ==
- All information from World Athletics.

| Distinction | Male | | | Female | | |
| Distinction | Athlete | Age | Date | Athlete | Age | Date |
|---|---|---|---|---|---|---|
| Youngest champion | Hennadiy Avdyeyenko (URS) | 19 years, 282 days | 13 Aug 1983 | Ioamnet Quintero (CUB) | 20 years, 337 days | 21 Aug 1993 |
| Youngest medalist | Hennadiy Avdyeyenko (URS) | 19 years, 282 days | 13 Aug 1983 | Yaroslava Mahuchikh (UKR) | 18 years, 11 days | 30 Sep 2019 |
| Youngest finalist | Patrik Sjöberg (SWE) | 18 years, 220 days | 13 Aug 1983 | Karmen Bruus (EST) | 17 years, 176 days | 19 Jul 2022 |
| Youngest participant | Tim Forsyth (AUS) | 18 years, 12 days | 8 Aug 2017 | Zheng Xingjuan (CHN) | 16 years, 139 days | 6 Aug 2005 |
| Oldest champion | Gianmarco Tamberi (ITA) | 31 years, 82 days | 22 Aug 2023 | Inha Babakova (UKR) | 32 years, 63 days | 29 Aug 1999 |
| Oldest medalist | Andriy Protsenko (UKR) | 34 years, 59 days | 18 Jul 2022 | Ruth Beitia (ESP) | 34 years, 138 days | 17 Aug 2013 |
| Oldest finalist | Eike Onnen (GER) | 35 years, 10 days | 13 Aug 2017 | Ruth Beitia (ESP) | 38 years, 133 days | 12 Aug 2017 |
| Oldest participant | Dragutin Topić (SRB) | 38 years, 160 days | 19 Aug 2009 | Venelina Veneva-Mateeva (BUL) | 41 years, 75 days | 27 Aug 2015 |

== Medalists ==
=== Men ===
| Championships | Gold | Silver | Bronze |
|---|---|---|---|
| 1983 Helsinki | Hennadiy Avdyeyenko (URS) | Tyke Peacock (USA) | Zhu Jianhua (CHN) |
| 1987 Rome | Patrik Sjöberg (SWE) | Hennadiy Avdyeyenko (URS) Igor Paklin (URS) | none awarded |
| 1991 Tokyo | Charles Austin (USA) | Javier Sotomayor (CUB) | Hollis Conway (USA) |
| 1993 Stuttgart | Javier Sotomayor (CUB) | Artur Partyka (POL) | Steve Smith (GBR) |
| 1995 Gothenburg | Troy Kemp (BAH) | Javier Sotomayor (CUB) | Artur Partyka (POL) |
| 1997 Athens | Javier Sotomayor (CUB) | Artur Partyka (POL) | Tim Forsyth (AUS) |
| 1999 Seville | Vyacheslav Voronin (RUS) | Mark Boswell (CAN) | Martin Buß (GER) |
| 2001 Edmonton | Martin Buß (GER) | Yaroslav Rybakov (RUS) Vyacheslav Voronin (RUS) | none awarded |
| 2003 Saint-Denis | Jacques Freitag (RSA) | Stefan Holm (SWE) | Mark Boswell (CAN) |
| 2005 Helsinki | Yuriy Krymarenko (UKR) | Víctor Moya (CUB) Yaroslav Rybakov (RUS) | none awarded |
| 2007 Osaka | Donald Thomas (BAH) | Yaroslav Rybakov (RUS) | Kyriakos Ioannou (CYP) |
| 2009 Berlin | Yaroslav Rybakov (RUS) | Kyriakos Ioannou (CYP) | Sylwester Bednarek (POL) Raúl Spank (GER) |
| 2011 Daegu | Jesse Williams (USA) | Aleksey Dmitrik (RUS) | Trevor Barry (BAH) |
| 2013 Moscow | Bohdan Bondarenko (UKR) | Mutaz Essa Barshim (QAT) | Derek Drouin (CAN) |
| 2015 Beijing | Derek Drouin (CAN) | Bohdan Bondarenko (UKR) Zhang Guowei (CHN) | none awarded |
| 2017 London | Mutaz Essa Barshim (QAT) | Danil Lysenko (ANA) | Majd Eddin Ghazal (SYR) |
| 2019 Doha | Mutaz Essa Barshim (QAT) | Mikhail Akimenko (ANA) | Ilya Ivanyuk (ANA) |
| 2022 Eugene | Mutaz Essa Barshim (QAT) | Woo Sang-hyeok (KOR) | Andriy Protsenko (UKR) |
| 2023 Budapest | Gianmarco Tamberi (ITA) | JuVaughn Harrison (USA) | Mutaz Essa Barshim (QAT) |
| 2025 Tokyo | Hamish Kerr (NZL) | Woo Sang-hyeok (KOR) | Jan Štefela (CZE) |

==== Medal table ====
| Rank | Nation | Gold | Silver | Bronze | Total |
|---|---|---|---|---|---|
| 1 | Qatar (QAT) | 3 | 1 | 1 | 5 |
| 2 | Russia (RUS) | 2 | 5 | 0 | 7 |
| 3 | Cuba (CUB) | 2 | 3 | 0 | 5 |
| 4 | United States (USA) | 2 | 2 | 1 | 5 |
| 5 | Ukraine (UKR) | 2 | 1 | 1 | 4 |
| 6 | Bahamas (BAH) | 2 | 0 | 1 | 3 |
| 7 | Soviet Union (URS) | 1 | 2 | 0 | 3 |
| 8 | Canada (CAN) | 1 | 1 | 2 | 4 |
| 9 | Sweden (SWE) | 1 | 1 | 0 | 2 |
| 10 | Germany (GER) | 1 | 0 | 2 | 3 |
| 11 | Italy (ITA) | 1 | 0 | 0 | 1 |
| 11 | New Zealand (NZL) | 1 | 0 | 0 | 1 |
| 11 | South Africa (RSA) | 1 | 0 | 0 | 1 |
| 14 | Poland (POL) | 0 | 2 | 2 | 4 |
| – | Authorised Neutral Athletes (ANA) | 0 | 2 | 1 | 3 |
| 15 | South Korea (KOR) | 0 | 2 | 0 | 2 |
| 16 | China (CHN) | 0 | 1 | 1 | 2 |
| 16 | Cyprus (CYP) | 0 | 1 | 1 | 2 |
| 18 | Australia (AUS) | 0 | 0 | 1 | 1 |
| 18 | Czech Republic (CZE) | 0 | 0 | 1 | 1 |
| 18 | Great Britain (GBR) | 0 | 0 | 1 | 1 |
| 18 | Syria (SYR) | 0 | 0 | 1 | 1 |
| Totals (21 entries) | | 20 | 24 | 17 | 61 |

==== Multiple medalists ====
| Rank | Athlete | Nation | Period | Gold | Silver | Bronze | Total |
|---|---|---|---|---|---|---|---|
| 1 | Mutaz Barshim | Qatar (QAT) | 2013-2022 | 3 | 1 | 1 | 5 |
| 2 | Javier Sotomayor | Cuba (CUB) | 1991–1997 | 2 | 2 | 0 | 4 |
| 3 | Yaroslav Rybakov | Russia (RUS) | 2001–2009 | 1 | 3 | 0 | 4 |
| 4 | Hennadiy Avdyeyenko | Soviet Union (URS) | 1983–1987 | 1 | 1 | 0 | 2 |
| 4 | Vyacheslav Voronin | Russia (RUS) | 1999–2001 | 1 | 1 | 0 | 2 |
| 4 | Bohdan Bondarenko | Ukraine (UKR) | 2013–2015 | 1 | 1 | 0 | 2 |
| 7 | Derek Drouin | Canada (CAN) | 2013–2015 | 1 | 0 | 1 | 2 |
| 8 | Artur Partyka | Poland (POL) | 1993–1997 | 0 | 2 | 1 | 3 |
| 9 | Woo Sang-hyeok | South Korea (KOR) | 2022–2025 | 0 | 2 | 0 | 2 |
| 10 | Mark Boswell | Canada (CAN) | 1999–2003 | 0 | 1 | 1 | 2 |
| 10 | Kyriakos Ioannou | Cyprus (CYP) | 2007–2009 | 0 | 1 | 1 | 2 |

=== Women ===
| Championships | Gold | Silver | Bronze |
|---|---|---|---|
| 1983 Helsinki | Tamara Bykova (URS) | Ulrike Meyfarth (FRG) | Louise Ritter (USA) |
| 1987 Rome | Stefka Kostadinova (BUL) | Tamara Bykova (URS) | Susanne Beyer (GDR) |
| 1991 Tokyo | Heike Henkel (GER) | Yelena Yelesina (URS) | Inha Babakova (URS) |
| 1993 Stuttgart | Ioamnet Quintero (CUB) | Silvia Costa (CUB) | Sigrid Kirchmann (AUT) |
| 1995 Gothenburg | Stefka Kostadinova (BUL) | Alina Astafei (GER) | Inha Babakova (UKR) |
| 1997 Athens | Hanne Haugland (NOR) | Inha Babakova (UKR) Olga Kaliturina (RUS) | none awarded |
| 1999 Seville | Inha Babakova (UKR) | Yelena Yelesina (RUS) | Svetlana Lapina (RUS) |
| 2001 Edmonton | Hestrie Cloete (RSA) | Inha Babakova (UKR) | Kajsa Bergqvist (SWE) |
| 2003 Saint-Denis | Hestrie Cloete (RSA) | Marina Kuptsova (RUS) | Kajsa Bergqvist (SWE) |
| 2005 Helsinki | Kajsa Bergqvist (SWE) | Chaunté Howard (USA) | Emma Green (SWE) |
| 2007 Osaka | Blanka Vlašić (CRO) | Anna Chicherova (RUS) Antonietta Di Martino (ITA) | none awarded |
| 2009 Berlin | Blanka Vlašić (CRO) | Ariane Friedrich (GER) | Antonietta Di Martino (ITA) |
| 2011 Daegu | Anna Chicherova (RUS) | Blanka Vlašić (CRO) | Antonietta Di Martino (ITA) |
| 2013 Moscow | Brigetta Barrett (USA) | Anna Chicherova (RUS) Ruth Beitia (ESP) | none awarded |
| 2015 Beijing | Mariya Kuchina (RUS) | Blanka Vlašić (CRO) | Anna Chicherova (RUS) |
| 2017 London | Mariya Lasitskene (ANA) | Yuliya Levchenko (UKR) | Kamila Lićwinko (POL) |
| 2019 Doha | Mariya Lasitskene (ANA) | Yaroslava Mahuchikh (UKR) | Vashti Cunningham (USA) |
| 2022 Eugene | Eleanor Patterson (AUS) | Yaroslava Mahuchikh (UKR) | Elena Vallortigara (ITA) |
| 2023 Budapest | Yaroslava Mahuchikh (UKR) | Eleanor Patterson (AUS) | Nicola Olyslagers (AUS) |

==== Multiple medalists ====
| Rank | Athlete | Nation | Period | Gold | Silver | Bronze | Total |
|---|---|---|---|---|---|---|---|
| 1 | Mariya Lasitskene | Russia (RUS); Authorised Neutral Athletes (ANA) | 2015-2019 | 3 | 0 | 0 | 3 |
| 2 | Blanka Vlašić | Croatia (CRO) | 2007–2015 | 2 | 2 | 0 | 4 |
| 3 | Stefka Kostadinova | Bulgaria (BUL) | 1987–1995 | 2 | 0 | 0 | 2 |
| 3 | Hestrie Cloete | South Africa (RSA) | 2001–2003 | 2 | 0 | 0 | 2 |
| 5 | Inha Babakova | Soviet Union (URS); Ukraine (UKR) | 1991–2001 | 1 | 2 | 2 | 5 |
| 6 | Anna Chicherova | Russia (RUS) | 2007–2015 | 1 | 2 | 1 | 4 |
| 6 | Yaroslava Mahuchikh | Ukraine (UKR) | 2019–2025 | 1 | 2 | 1 | 4 |
| 8 | Tamara Bykova | Soviet Union (URS) | 1983–1987 | 1 | 1 | 0 | 2 |
| 8 | Eleanor Patterson | Australia (AUS) | 2022–2023 | 1 | 1 | 0 | 2 |
| 9 | Kajsa Bergqvist | Sweden (SWE) | 2001–2005 | 1 | 0 | 2 | 3 |
| 10 | Nicola Olyslagers | Australia (AUS) | 2023–2025 | 1 | 0 | 1 | 2 |
| 11 | Yelena Yelesina | Soviet Union (URS); Russia (RUS) | 1991–1999 | 0 | 2 | 0 | 2 |
| 12 | Antonietta Di Martino | Italy (ITA) | 2007–2011 | 0 | 1 | 2 | 3 |

==== Medals by country ====
| Rank | Nation | Gold | Silver | Bronze | Total |
|---|---|---|---|---|---|
| 1 | Russia (RUS) | 2 | 5 | 2 | 9 |
| 1 | Ukraine (UKR) | 2 | 5 | 2 | 9 |
| 3 | Croatia (CRO) | 2 | 2 | 0 | 4 |
| 4 | Australia (AUS) | 2 | 1 | 1 | 4 |
| – | Authorised Neutral Athletes (ANA) | 2 | 0 | 0 | 2 |
| 5 | Bulgaria (BUL) | 2 | 0 | 0 | 2 |
| 5 | South Africa (RSA) | 2 | 0 | 0 | 2 |
| 7 | Soviet Union (URS) | 1 | 2 | 1 | 4 |
| 8 | Germany (GER) | 1 | 2 | 0 | 3 |
| 9 | United States (USA) | 1 | 1 | 2 | 4 |
| 10 | Cuba (CUB) | 1 | 1 | 0 | 2 |
| 11 | Sweden (SWE) | 1 | 0 | 3 | 4 |
| 12 | Norway (NOR) | 1 | 0 | 0 | 1 |
| 13 | Italy (ITA) | 0 | 1 | 3 | 4 |
| 14 | Poland (POL) | 0 | 1 | 1 | 2 |
| 15 | West Germany (FRG) | 0 | 1 | 0 | 1 |
| 15 | Spain (ESP) | 0 | 1 | 0 | 1 |
| 17 | Austria (AUT) | 0 | 0 | 1 | 1 |
| 17 | East Germany (GDR) | 0 | 0 | 1 | 1 |
| 17 | Serbia (SRB) | 0 | 0 | 1 | 1 |
| 19 nations | | 20 | 23 | 18 | 61 |

== Championship record progression ==
=== Men ===
Men's high jump World Championships record progression
| Mark | Athlete | Nation | Year | Round | Date |
|---|---|---|---|---|---|
| 2.26 m | Carlo Thränhardt | West Germany (FRG) | 1983 | Final | 1983-08-13 |
| 2.26 m | Valeriy Serada | Soviet Union (URS) | 1983 | Final | 1983-08-13 |
| 2.26 m | Zhu Jianhua | China (CHN) | 1983 | Final | 1983-08-13 |
| 2.26 m | Hennadiy Avdyeyenko | Soviet Union (URS) | 1983 | Final | 1983-08-13 |
| 2.26 m | Dwight Stones | United States (USA) | 1983 | Final | 1983-08-13 |
| 2.26 m | Tyke Peacock | United States (USA) | 1983 | Final | 1983-08-13 |
| 2.26 m | Milton Ottey | Canada (CAN) | 1983 | Final | 1983-08-13 |
| 2.26 m | Igor Paklin | Soviet Union (URS) | 1983 | Final | 1983-08-13 |
| 2.26 m | Luca Toso | Italy (ITA) | 1983 | Final | 1983-08-13 |
| 2.29 m | Dietmar Mögenburg | West Germany (FRG) | 1983 | Final | 1983-08-13 |
| 2.29 m | Zhu Jianhua | China (CHN) | 1983 | Final | 1983-08-13 |
| 2.29 m | Igor Paklin | Soviet Union (URS) | 1983 | Final | 1983-08-13 |
| 2.29 m | Tyke Peacock | United States (USA) | 1983 | Final | 1983-08-13 |
| 2.29 m | Hennadiy Avdyeyenko | Soviet Union (URS) | 1983 | Final | 1983-08-13 |
| 2.29 m | Dwight Stones | United States (USA) | 1983 | Final | 1983-08-13 |
| 2.32 m | Hennadiy Avdyeyenko | Soviet Union (URS) | 1983 | Final | 1983-08-13 |
| 2.32 m | Tyke Peacock | United States (USA) | 1983 | Final | 1983-08-13 |
| 2.32 m | Igor Paklin | Soviet Union (URS) | 1987 | Final | 1987-09-06 |
| 2.32 m | Sorin Matei | Romania (ROU) | 1987 | Final | 1987-09-06 |
| 2.32 m | Patrik Sjöberg | Sweden (SWE) | 1987 | Final | 1987-09-06 |
| 2.32 m | Clarence Saunders | Bermuda (BER) | 1987 | Final | 1987-09-06 |
| 2.32 m | Hennadiy Avdyeyenko | Soviet Union (URS) | 1987 | Final | 1987-09-06 |
| 2.35 m | Patrik Sjöberg | Sweden (SWE) | 1987 | Final | 1987-09-06 |
| 2.35 m | Dietmar Mögenburg | West Germany (FRG) | 1987 | Final | 1987-09-06 |
| 2.35 m | Igor Paklin | Soviet Union (URS) | 1987 | Final | 1987-09-06 |
| 2.35 m | Hennadiy Avdyeyenko | Soviet Union (URS) | 1987 | Final | 1987-09-06 |
| 2.38 m | Patrik Sjöberg | Sweden (SWE) | 1987 | Final | 1987-09-06 |
| 2.38 m | Igor Paklin | Soviet Union (URS) | 1987 | Final | 1987-09-06 |
| 2.38 m | Hennadiy Avdyeyenko | Soviet Union (URS) | 1987 | Final | 1987-09-06 |
| 2.38 m | Charles Austin | United States (USA) | 1991 | Final | 1991-09-01 |
| 2.40 m | Javier Sotomayor | Cuba (CUB) | 1993 | Final | 1993-08-22 |
| 2.41 m | Bohdan Bondarenko | Ukraine (UKR) | 2013 | Final | 2013-08-15 |

=== Women ===
Women's high jump World Championships record progression
| Time | Athlete | Nation | Year | Round | Date |
|---|---|---|---|---|---|
| 1.92 m | Tamara Bykova | Soviet Union (URS) | 1983 | Final | 1983-08-09 |
| 1.92 m | Ulrike Meyfarth | West Germany (FRG) | 1983 | Final | 1983-08-09 |
| 1.92 m | Coleen Sommer | United States (USA) | 1983 | Final | 1983-08-09 |
| 1.92 m | Kerstin Brandt | East Germany (GDR) | 1983 | Final | 1983-08-09 |
| 1.92 m | Louise Ritter | United States (USA) | 1983 | Final | 1983-08-09 |
| 1.95 m | Tamara Bykova | Soviet Union (URS) | 1983 | Final | 1983-08-09 |
| 1.95 m | Ulrike Meyfarth | West Germany (FRG) | 1983 | Final | 1983-08-09 |
| 1.95 m | Louise Ritter | United States (USA) | 1983 | Final | 1983-08-09 |
| 1.95 m | Coleen Sommer | United States (USA) | 1983 | Final | 1983-08-09 |
| 1.97 m | Tamara Bykova | Soviet Union (URS) | 1983 | Final | 1983-08-09 |
| 1.97 m | Ulrike Meyfarth | West Germany (FRG) | 1983 | Final | 1983-08-09 |
| 1.99 m | Tamara Bykova | Soviet Union (URS) | 1983 | Final | 1983-08-09 |
| 1.99 m | Ulrike Meyfarth | West Germany (FRG) | 1983 | Final | 1983-08-09 |
| 2.01 m | Tamara Bykova | Soviet Union (URS) | 1983 | Final | 1983-08-09 |
| 2.02 m | Tamara Bykova | Soviet Union (URS) | 1983 | Final | 1983-08-09 |
| 2.02 m | Stefka Kostadinova | Bulgaria (BUL) | 1987 | Final | 1987-08-30 |
| 2.04 m | Tamara Bykova | Soviet Union (URS) | 1987 | Final | 1987-08-30 |
| 2.04 m | Stefka Kostadinova | Bulgaria (BUL) | 1987 | Final | 1987-08-30 |
| 2.06 m | Stefka Kostadinova | Bulgaria (BUL) | 1987 | Final | 1987-08-30 |
| 2.09 m | Stefka Kostadinova | Bulgaria (BUL) | 1987 | Final | 1987-08-30 |

== Best performances ==
=== Top ten highest World Championship jumps^{1} ===
Highest men's jumps at the World Championships
| Rank | Height(m) | Athlete | Nation | Year | Date |
|---|---|---|---|---|---|
| 1 | 2.41 m | Bohdan Bondarenko | Ukraine | 2013 | 2013-08-15 |
| 2 | 2.40 m | Javier Sotomayor | Cuba | 1993 | 1993-08-22 |
| 3 | 2.38 m | Patrik Sjöberg | Sweden | 1987 | 1987-09-06 |
| 3 | 2.38 m | Igor Paklin | Soviet Union | 1987 | 1987-09-06 |
| 3 | 2.38 m | Hennadiy Avdyeyenko | Soviet Union | 1987 | 1987-09-06 |
| 3 | 2.38 m | Charles Austin | United States | 1991 | 1991-09-01 |
| 3 | 2.38 m | Mutaz Essa Barshim | Qatar | 2013 | 2013-08-15 |
| 3 | 2.38 m | Derek Drouin | Canada | 2013 | 2013-08-15 |
| 9 | 2.37 m | Artur Partyka | Poland | 1993 | 1993-08-22 |
| 9 | 2.37 m | Steve Smith | Great Britain | 1993 | 1993-08-22 |
| 9 | 2.37 m | Troy Kemp | Bahamas | 1995 | 1995-08-08 |
| 9 | 2.37 m | Javier Sotomayor | Cuba | 1995 | 1995-08-08 |
| 9 | 2.37 m | Javier Sotomayor | Cuba | 1997 | 1997-08-06 |
| 9 | 2.37 m | Vyacheslav Voronin | Russia | 1999 | 1999-08-23 |
| 9 | 2.37 m | Mutaz Essa Barshim | Qatar | 2019 | 2019-10-04 |
| 9 | 2.37 m | Mutaz Essa Barshim | Qatar | 2022 | 2022-07-18 |

Highest women's jumps at the World Championships
| Rank | Height (m) | Athlete | Nation | Year | Date |
|---|---|---|---|---|---|
| 1 | 2.09 m | Stefka Kostadinova | Bulgaria | 1987 | 1987-08-30 |
| 2 | 2.06 m | Hestrie Cloete | South Africa | 2003 | 2003-08-31 |
| 3 | 2.05 m | Heike Henkel | Germany | 1991 | 1991-08-31 |
| 3 | 2.05 m | Blanka Vlašić | Croatia | 2007 | 2007-09-02 |
| 5 | 2.04 m | Blanka Vlašić | Croatia | 2009 | 2009-08-20 |
| 5 | 2.04 m | Mariya Lasitskene | Authorised Neutral Athletes | 2019 | 2019-09-30 |
| 5 | 2.04 m | Yaroslava Mahuchikh | Ukraine | 2019 | 2019-09-30 |
| 8 | 2.03 m | Anna Chicherova | Russia | 2007 | 2007-09-02 |
| 8 | 2.03 m | Antonietta Di Martino | Italy | 2007 | 2007-09-02 |
| 8 | 2.03 m | Anna Chicherova | Russia | 2011 | 2011-09-03 |
| 8 | 2.03 m | Blanka Vlašić | Croatia | 2011 | 2011-09-03 |
| 8 | 2.03 m | Mariya Lasitskene | Authorised Neutral Athletes | 2017 | 2017-08-12 |

^{1}Does not include ancillary marks

== See also ==
- High jump
- High jump at the Olympics

== Bibliography ==
- Butler, Mark (2023). World Athletics Championships Budapest 2023 Statistics Book. World Athletics.
