= 1995 IAAF World Indoor Championships – Men's high jump =

The men's high jump event at the 1995 IAAF World Indoor Championships was held on 11–12 March.

== Medalists ==
Gold	Silver	Bronze
Javier Sotomayor; Cuba	Labros Papakostas; Greece	Tony Barton; United States

== Results ==
=== Qualification ===
Qualification: 2.26 (Q) or at least 12 best performers (q) qualified for the final.

Rank	Group	Name	Nationality	2.00	2.10	2.15	2.20	2.24	2.26	Result	Notes
1	A	Gilmar Mayo	Colombia	–	–	o	–	o	xo	2.26	Q
2	A	Stevan Zorić	Yugoslavia	–	–	o	o	xo	xo	2.26	Q
3	A	Steve Smith	United States	–	–	–	o	o	xxo	2.26	Q
4	A	Ettore Ceresoli	Italy	–	o	o	–	o	xxx	2.24	q
5	B	Dalton Grant	Great Britain	–	–	–	xo	o	–	2.24	q
6	B	Toni Riepl	Germany	–	–	xo	o	xo	–	2.24	q
7	A	Dimitrios Kokotis	Greece	–	–	o	o	x–	xx	2.20	q
7	B	Javier Sotomayor	Cuba	–	–	–	o	–	–	2.20	q
7	B	Labros Papakostas	Greece	–	–	–	o	–	–	2.20	q
7	B	Ralf Sonn	Germany	–	–	–	o	–	–	2.20	q
7	B	Steinar Hoen	Norway	–	–	–	o	–	–	2.20	q
7	B	Håkon Särnblom	Norway	–	–	–	o	–	–	2.20	q
7	B	Tony Barton	United States	–	–	o	o	–	–	2.20	q
14	A	Gustavo Becker	Spain	–	–	o	xo	xxx		2.20	
15	B	Brendan Reilly	Great Britain	–	–	xo	xo	xxx		2.20	
16	B	Eugen-Cristian Popescu	Romania	–	–	o	xxo	xxx		2.20	
17	B	Oleg Zhukovskiy	Belarus	–	–	xo	xxx			2.15	
18	A	Ivan Penavić	Croatia	o	o	xxx				2.10	
19	A	Hugo Muñoz	Peru	–	xxo	xxx				2.10	
20	A	Antonio Pazzaglia	San Marino	xo	xxx					2.00	
	A	Rupert Charles	Dominica	xxx						NM	

=== Final ===
Rank	Name	Nationality	2.15	2.20	2.24	2.28	2.32	2.35	2.38	2.41	2.44	Results	Notes
1st place, gold medalist(s)	Javier Sotomayor	Cuba	–	–	xo	–	o	o	o	–	xxx	2.38	
2nd place, silver medalist(s)	Labros Papakostas	Greece	–	o	o	xo	xo	xo	x–	xx		2.35	NR
3rd place, bronze medalist(s)	Tony Barton	United States	–	o	o	o	o	xxx				2.32	
4	Steinar Hoen	Norway	–	–	o	–	xo	xxx				2.32	
5	Ralf Sonn	Germany	–	o	o	o	xxx					2.28	
6	Stevan Zorić	Yugoslavia	–	o	o	xo	xxx					2.28	
7	Steve Smith	United States	–	xo	xo	xo	xxx					2.28	
8	Dalton Grant	Great Britain	–	o	o	xxo	xx–	x				2.28	
8	Ettore Ceresoli	Italy	o	o	o	xxo	xx					2.28	
10	Håkon Särnblom	Norway	–	–	o	–	xxx					2.24	
10	Gilmar Mayo	Colombia	o	–	o	xxx						2.24	
12	Toni Riepl	Germany	o	o	xxo	xxx						2.24	
13	Dimitrios Kokotis	Greece	–	o	xx–	x						2.20	
