= 1994 European Athletics Championships – Men's high jump =

Men's high jump at the European Athletics Championships

These are the official results of the Men's High Jump event at the 1994 European Championships in Helsinki, Finland, held at Helsinki Olympic Stadium on 7 and 9 August 1994.

== Medalists ==
| Gold | Steinar Hoen; Norway |
| Silver | Artur Partyka; Poland |
| Silver | Steve Smith; Great Britain |

== Results ==
=== Qualification ===
Qualification: 2.28 m (Q) or best 12 performances (q)

| Rank | Group | Name | Nationality | 2.05 | 2.10 | 2.15 | 2.20 | 2.23 | 2.26 | Result | Notes |
|---|---|---|---|---|---|---|---|---|---|---|---|
| 1 | A | Leonid Pumalainen | Russia | | | | | | | 2.26 | q |
| 2 | A | Stevan Zorić | Independent European Participants | | | | | | | 2.23 | q |
| 2 | A | Jean-Charles Gicquel | France | | | | | | | 2.23 | q |
| 2 | A | Artur Partyka | Poland | | | | | | | 2.23 | q |
| 2 | A | Dimitrios Kokotis | Greece | – | o | o | | | | 2.23 | q |
| 6 | A | Ralf Sonn | Germany | | | | | | | 2.23 | q |
| 6 | A | Håkon Särnblom | Norway | | | | | | | 2.23 | q |
| 6 | A | Steve Smith | Great Britain | – | – | o | – | xo | | 2.23 | q |
| 9 | A | Juha Isolehto | Finland | | | | | | | 2.20 | |
| 10 | A | Normunds Sietiņš | Latvia | | | | | | | 2.15 | |
| 10 | A | Itai Margalit | Israel | – | o | o | | | | 2.15 | |
| 12 | A | Kristofer Lamos | Germany | | | | | | | 2.15 | |
| 13 | A | Gustavo Becker | Spain | | | | | | | 2.10 | |
| 1 | B | Lambros Papakostas | Greece | | | | | | | 2.26 | q |
| 2 | B | Dalton Grant | Great Britain | – | – | o | xo | xo | xxo | 2.26 | q |
| 3 | B | Steinar Hoen | Norway | | | | | | | 2.23 | q |
| 4 | B | Wolfgang Kreissig | Germany | | | | | | | 2.23 | q |
| 5 | B | Jarosław Kotewicz | Poland | – | – | o | | | | 2.23 | q |
| 5 | B | Dragutin Topić | Independent European Participants | | | | | | | 2.23 | q |
| 5 | B | Oleg Zhukovskiy | Belarus | | | | | | | 2.23 | q |
| 8 | B | Brendan Reilly | Great Britain | – | – | o | o | xxx | | 2.20 | |
| 9 | B | Roberto Ferrari | Italy | o | o | o | | | | 2.20 | |
| 9 | B | Robert Kołodziejczyk | Poland | | | | | | | 2.20 | |
| 11 | B | Sorin Matei | Romania | | | | | | | 2.15 | |
| 12 | B | Mark Mandy | Ireland | – | xxo | | | | | 2.15 | |
| 13 | B | Zoltán Bakler | Hungary | | | | | | | 2.10 | |

=== Final ===
| Rank | Name | Nationality | 2.10 | 2.15 | 2.20 | 2.25 | 2.28 | 2.31 | 2.33 | 2.35 | Result | Notes |
|---|---|---|---|---|---|---|---|---|---|---|---|---|
| 1st place, gold medalist(s) | Steinar Hoen | Norway | – | – | – | o | – | xo | o | xxo | 2.35 | CR |
| 2nd place, silver medalist(s) | Artur Partyka | Poland | – | o | – | o | – | xxo | xo | xxx | 2.33 | |
| 2nd place, silver medalist(s) | Steve Smith | Great Britain | – | – | – | o | – | xxo | xo | xxx | 2.33 | |
| 4 | Håkon Särnblom | Norway | – | – | o | o | o | xo | | | 2.31 | PB |
| 5 | Jarosław Kotewicz | Poland | | | | | | | | | 2.31 | PB |
| 5 | Dragutin Topić | Independent European Participants | | | | | | | | | 2.31 | |
| 7 | Leonid Pumalainen | Russia | | | | | | | | | 2.28 | |
| 8 | Lambros Papakostas | Greece | | | | | | | | | 2.28 | |
| 9 | Dalton Grant | Great Britain | – | – | o | o | – | xxx | | | 2.25 | |
| 9 | Jean-Charles Gicquel | France | | | | | | | | | 2.25 | |
| 11 | Stevan Zorić | Independent European Participants | | | | | | | | | 2.25 | |
| 12 | Ralf Sonn | Germany | | | | | | | | | 2.25 | |
| 13 | Wolfgang Kreissig | Germany | | | | | | | | | 2.20 | |
| 14 | Oleg Zhukovskiy | Belarus | | | | | | | | | 2.15 | |
| 15 | Dimitrios Kokotis | Greece | | | | | | | | | 2.15 | |

== Participation ==
According to an unofficial count, 26 athletes from 17 countries participated in the event.

- Belarus (1)
- Finland (1)
- France (1)
- Germany (3)
- Great Britain (3)
- Greece (2)
- Hungary (1)
- Independent European Participants (2)
- Ireland (1)
- Israel (1)
- Italy (1)
- Latvia (1)
- Norway (2)
- Poland (3)
- Romania (1)
- Russia (1)
- Spain (1)

== See also ==
- 1988 Men's Olympic High Jump (Seoul)
- 1990 Men's European Championships High Jump (Split)
- 1991 Men's World Championships High Jump (Tokyo)
- 1992 Men's Olympic High Jump (Barcelona)
- 1993 Men's World Championships High Jump (Stuttgart)
- 1995 Men's World Championships High Jump (Gothenburg)
- 1996 Men's Olympic High Jump (Atlanta)
- 1997 Men's World Championships High Jump (Athens)
- 1998 Men's European Championships High Jump (Budapest)
