= Athletics at the 1992 Summer Olympics – Men's high jump =

Men's high jump at the Games of the XXV Olympiad
- Pictogram for Athletics
- Venue: Estadi Olímpic de Montjuïc
- Dates: 31 July (qualifying); 2 August (final)
- Competitors: 43 from 27 nations
- Winning height: 2.34

Medalists
1st place, gold medalist(s)		Javier Sotomayor; Cuba
2nd place, silver medalist(s)		Patrik Sjöberg; Sweden
3rd place, bronze medalist(s)		Artur Partyka; Poland
3rd place, bronze medalist(s)		Tim Forsyth; Australia
3rd place, bronze medalist(s)		Hollis Conway; United States

The men's high jump was an event at the 1992 Summer Olympics in Barcelona, Spain. There were 43 participating athletes from 27 nations. The maximum number of athletes per nation had been set at 3 since the 1930 Olympic Congress. The qualification mark was set at 2.29 metres (two + twelve athletes). The event was won by Javier Sotomayor of Cuba, the nation's first victory in the men's high jump. Patrik Sjöberg of Sweden earned silver, becoming the first man to win a third medal in the event, though he never won gold. Sweden was only the third country (after the United States and Soviet Union) to have three consecutive podium appearances. A three-way tie for third could not be resolved by countback, so bronze medals were awarded to Tim Forsyth (Australia's first medal in the event since 1956), Artur Partyka (Poland's first since 1980), and Hollis Conway (the United States reaching the podium in 20 of the 22 Olympic men's high jump competitions to date; Conway was the sixth man with two medals in the event).

== Background ==
This was the 22nd appearance of the event, which is one of 12 athletics events to have been held at every Summer Olympics. The returning finalists from the 1988 Games were silver medalist Hollis Conway of the United States, bronze medalist (and 1984 silver medalist) Patrik Sjöberg of Sweden, fifth-place finisher Clarence Saunders of Bermuda, sixth-place finisher (and 1984 gold medalist Dietmar Mögenburg of West Germany, seventh-place finishers Dalton Grant of Great Britain and Igor Paklin of the Soviet Union (now the Unified Team), and fourteenth-place finisher Arturo Ortiz of Spain. Javier Sotomayor of Cuba, the world record holder, had been prevented from competing in 1984 and 1988 by boycotts; he finally had an opportunity to compete at the Olympics, and was favored. Sjöberg, the two-time Olympic medalist, 1987 world champion, and world record holder before Sotomayor, was also a contender. So were Americans Conway and Charles Austin (the reigning world champion).

The British Virgin Islands, Gabon, Jordan, Mauritius, Qatar, and the Seychelles each made their debut in the event; former Soviet republics appeared as the "Unified Team" and Yugoslav athletes competed as "Independent Olympic Participants". The United States made its 21st appearance, most of any nation, having missed only the boycotted 1980 Games.

== Competition format ==
The competition used the two-round format introduced in 1912. There were two distinct rounds of jumping with results cleared between rounds. Jumpers were eliminated if they had three consecutive failures, whether at a single height or between multiple heights if they attempted to advance before clearing a height.

The qualifying round had the bar set at 2.00 metres, 2.05 metres, 2.10 metres, 2.15 metres, 2.20 metres, 2.23 metres, 2.26 metres, and 2.29 metres. All jumpers clearing 2.29 metres in the qualifying round advanced to the final. If fewer than 12 jumpers could achieve it, the top 12 (including ties) would advance to the final.

The final had jumps at 2.15 metres, 2.20 metres, 2.24 metres, 2.28 metres, 2.31 metres, 2.34 metres, 2.37 metres, and 2.39 metres.

== Records ==
These were the standing world and Olympic records (in metres) prior to the 1992 Summer Olympics.

World record	Javier Sotomayor (CUB)	2.44	San Juan, Puerto Rico	29 July 1989
Olympic record	Hennadiy Avdyeyenko (URS)	2.38	Seoul, South Korea	25 September 1988

== Schedule ==
All times are Central European Summer Time (UTC+2)

Date	Time	Round
Friday, 31 July 1992	18:10	Qualifying
Sunday, 2 August 1992	18:00	Final

== Results ==
Key

- o = Height cleared
- x = Height failed
- – = Height passed
- r = Retired
- SB = Season's best
- PB = Personal best
- NR = National record
- AR = Area record
- OR = Olympic record
- WR = World record
- WL = World lead
- NM = No mark
- DNS = Did not start
- DQ = Disqualified

=== Qualifying round ===
Qualification: Qualifying Performance 2.29 (Q) or at least 12 best performers (q) advance to the final. With 14 athletes clearing 2.26 metres, many chose not to even attempt (or to take only one attempt) at 2.29 metres (knowing that as long as at least 3 men did so, all of those who had achieved 2.26 metres would advance).

Rank	Group	Athlete	Nation	2.00	2.05	2.10	2.15	2.20	2.23	2.26	2.29	Height	Notes
1	B	Marino Drake	Cuba	–	–	–	o	–	xxo	xo	xo	2.29	Q
2	B	Steve Smith	Great Britain	–	–	–	o	–	o	xo	xxo	2.29	Q
3	A	Javier Sotomayor	Cuba	–	–	–	–	o	–	o	–	2.26	q
3	B	Charles Austin	United States	–	–	–	–	o	–	o	x-	2.26	q
3	B	Patrik Sjöberg	Sweden	–	–	–	–	–	o	o	x-	2.26	q
3	B	Dragutin Topić	Independent Olympic Participants	–	–	–	–	o	–	o	–	2.26	q
7	B	Ralf Sonn	Germany	–	–	–	o	xo	o	o	–	2.26	q
8	A	Sorin Matei	Romania	–	–	–	xo	o	xo	o	–	2.26	q
8	B	Gustavo Adolfo Becker	Spain	–	–	–	xo	xo	–	o	–	2.26	q
10	A	Hollis Conway	United States	–	–	–	o	o	o	xo	–	2.26	q
10	B	Troy Kemp	Bahamas	–	–	–	–	o	–	xo	x-	2.26	q
12	A	Georgi Dakov	Bulgaria	–	–	–	o	xo	xo	xo	–	2.26	q
13	A	Artur Partyka	Poland	–	–	o	–	o	–	xxo	–	2.26	q
14	A	Tim Forsyth	Australia	–	–	–	–	xo	o	xxo	–	2.26	q
15	A	Steinar Hoen	Norway	–	–	–	o	o	xo	xxx	—	2.23	
16	A	Ian Thompson	Bahamas	–	–	–	xo	o	xxo	xxx	—	2.23	
16	B	Brendan Reilly	Great Britain	–	–	o	o	xo	xxo	xxx	—	2.23	
18	A	Darrin Plab	United States	–	–	–	xxo	xo	xxo	xxx	—	2.23	
19	A	Lee Jin-taek	South Korea	–	–	–	–	o	–	xxx	—	2.20	
19	B	Lambros Papakostas	Greece	–	–	–	–	o	xxx	—		2.20	
19	B	Håkon Särnblom	Norway	–	–	o	o	o	–	xxx	—	2.20	
22	B	Igor Paklin	Unified Team	–	–	–	–	xo	–	xxx	—	2.20	
22	B	Lochsley Thomson	Australia	–	–	o	–	xo	xxx	—		2.20	
24	A	Yuriy Sergiyenko	Unified Team	–	–	o	xo	xo	xxx	—		2.20	
25	A	Wolf-Hendrik Beyer	Germany	–	–	–	o	xxo	xxx	—		2.20	
26	A	Xu Yang	China	–	o	xo	o	xxo	xxx	—		2.20	
27	A	Arturo Ortiz	Spain	–	–	–	o	–	xxx	—		2.15	
27	A	Dietmar Mögenburg	Germany	–	–	–	o	xxx	—			2.15	
29	A	Dalton Grant	Great Britain	–	–	–	xo	xxx	—			2.15	
29	A	Stevan Zorić	Independent Olympic Participants	–	–	–	xo	xxx	—			2.15	
31	A	David Anderson	Australia	–	–	o	xxo	xxx	—			2.15	
31	A	Alex Zaliauskas	Canada	–	–	o	xxo	xxx	—			2.15	
33	A	Khemraj Naiko	Mauritius	–	–	o	xxx	—				2.10	
33	A	Kosmas Mikhalopoulos	Greece	–	–	o	–	xxx	—			2.10	
33	A	Hossein Shahyan	Iran	–	–	o	xxx	—				2.10	
33	B	Danny Beauchamp	Seychelles	o	o	o	xxx	—				2.10	
33	B	Yacine Mousli	Algeria	–	–	o	xxx	—				2.10	
33	B	Abdullah Mohamed Al-Sheib	Qatar	–	o	o	xxx	—				2.10	
39	A	Karl Scatliffe	British Virgin Islands	o	o	xo	xxx	—				2.10	
39	B	Cho Hyun-uk	South Korea	–	–	xo	xxx	—				2.10	
41	A	Hilaire Onwanlélé-Ozimo	Gabon	–	o	xxx	—					2.05	
42	B	Fakhredin Fouad	Jordan	o	xo	xxx	—					2.05	
—	B	Clarence Saunders	Bermuda	–	–	–	xxx	—				No mark	

=== Final ===
The final was held on August 2, 1992.

Rank	Athlete	Nation	2.15	2.20	2.24	2.28	2.31	2.34	2.37	2.39	Height
1st place, gold medalist(s)	Javier Sotomayor	Cuba	–	–	xo	–	o	o	xx-	x	2.34
2nd place, silver medalist(s)	Patrik Sjöberg	Sweden	–	–	o	–	o	xo	xxx	—	2.34
3rd place, bronze medalist(s)	Artur Partyka	Poland	o	–	xo	–	o	xo	xxx	—	2.34
3rd place, bronze medalist(s)	Tim Forsyth	Australia	–	o	o	–	xo	xo	xxx	—	2.34
3rd place, bronze medalist(s)	Hollis Conway	United States	–	o	–	xo	–	xo	xxx	—	2.34
6	Ralf Sonn	Germany	–	o	o	o	o	xx-	x	—	2.31
7	Troy Kemp	Bahamas	–	o	–	xo	o	xxx	—		2.31
8	Marino Drake	Cuba	–	o	–	o	xxx	—			2.28
8	Charles Austin	United States	–	o	–	o	x-	xx	—		2.28
8	Dragutin Topić	Independent Olympic Participants	–	o	–	o	xx-	x	—		2.28
11	Gustavo Adolfo Becker	Spain	–	o	xo	o	xxx	—			2.28
12	Steve Smith	Great Britain	o	–	o	xx-	x	—			2.24
13	Sorin Matei	Romania	–	–	xo	xxx	—				2.24
14	Georgi Dakov	Bulgaria	o	o	xxo	xxx	—				2.24

== See also ==
- 1990 Men's European Championships High Jump
- 1991 Men's World Championships High Jump
- 1993 Men's World Championships High Jump
