= 1996 European Athletics Indoor Championships – Men's high jump =

The men's high jump event at the 1996 European Athletics Indoor Championships was held in Stockholm Globe Arena on 9–10 March.

== Medalists ==
Gold	Silver	Bronze
Dragutin Topić; Yugoslavia	Leonid Pumalainen; Russia	Steinar Hoen; Norway

== Results ==
=== Qualification ===
Qualification performance: 2.25 (Q) or at least 12 best performers (q) advanced to the final.

Rank	Athlete	Nationality	Result	Notes
1	Steinar Hoen	Norway	2.25	Q
1	Jan Janků	Czech Republic	2.25	Q
3	Andrey Sankovich	Belarus	2.22	q
3	Jarosław Kotewicz	Poland	2.22	q
3	Leonid Pumalainen	Russia	2.22	q
3	Staffan Strand	Sweden	2.22	q
3	Vyacheslav Tyrtyshnik	Ukraine	2.22	q
3	Dragutin Topić	Yugoslavia	2.22	q
3	Stevan Zorić	Yugoslavia	2.22	q
3	Mika Polku	Finland	2.22	q
3	Arturo Ortiz	Spain	2.22	q
3	Konstantin Matusevich	Israel	2.22	q
13	Christian Rhoden	Germany	2.22	
13	Joël Vincent	France	2.22	
15	Mark Mandy	Ireland	2.19	
15	Hakon Särnblom	Norway	2.19	
15	Luca Zampieri	Italy	2.19	
15	Patrick Thavelin	Sweden	2.19	
19	Işık Bayraktar	Turkey	2.15	
19	Antoine Burke	Ireland	2.15	
19	Ramon Kaju	Estonia	2.15	
19	Anton Riepl	Germany	2.15	
19	Sergey Kolesnik	Ukraine	2.15	
19	Dalton Grant	Great Britain	2.15	
25	Esteve Martín	Andorra	2.10	

=== Final ===
Rank	Name	Nationality	2.15	2.20	2.24	2.27	2.29	2.31	2.33	2.35	2.37	Result	Notes
1st place, gold medalist(s)	Dragutin Topić	Yugoslavia	–	–	o	–	x–	o	xo	o	xxx	2.35	
2nd place, silver medalist(s)	Leonid Pumalainen	Russia	o	o	o	–	o	–	xo	x–	xx	2.33	
3rd place, bronze medalist(s)	Steinar Hoen	Norway	–	o	o	o	x–	o	xxx			2.31	
4	Konstantin Matusevich	Israel	o	o	xo	xxo	o	xxo	xxx			2.31	NR
5	Jarosław Kotewicz	Poland	o	–	o	o	o	x–	xx			2.29	
6	Arturo Ortiz	Spain										2.27	
7	Jan Janků	Czech Republic										2.24	
8	Mika Polku	Finland										2.24	
9	Staffan Strand	Sweden										2.20	
9	Stevan Zorić	Yugoslavia										2.20	
11	Andrey Sankovich	Belarus										2.20	
12	Vyacheslav Tyrtyshnik	Ukraine										2.15	
