= Athletics at the 1993 Summer Universiade – Men's high jump =

The men's high jump event at the 1993 Summer Universiade was held at the UB Stadium in Buffalo, United States on 16 and 17 July.

== Medalists ==
Gold	Silver	Bronze
Tony Barton; United States	Stevan Zorić; Independent Participants	Arturo Ortíz; Spain

== Results ==
=== Qualification ===
Rank	Group	Athlete	Nationality	Result	Notes
?	?	Ruslan Stipanov	Ukraine	2.11	q
?	?	Dragutin Topić	Independent Participants	2.11	q
?	?	Lee Jin-taek	South Korea	2.11	q
?	?	Arturo Ortíz	Spain	2.11	q
?	?	Ian Thompson	Bahamas	2.11	q
?	?	Stevan Zorić	Independent Participants	2.11	q
?	?	Alex Zaliauskas	Canada	2.11	q
?	?	Xu Xiaodong	China	2.11	q
?	?	Tony Barton	United States	2.11	q
?	?	Brendan Reilly	Great Britain	2.11	q
?	?	Randall Jenkins	United States	2.11	q
?	?	Jean-Charles Gicquel	France	2.11	q
?	?	Aliaksandr Buglakou	Belarus	2.11	q
?	?	Xavier Robillard	France	2.11	q
15	?	Carlos Peña	Spain	2.05	
16	?	Mathias Ngadjadoum	Chad	2.00	
16	?	Akuila Ratu	Fiji	1.95	
16	?	Gerrit van Rooyen	Namibia	1.90	

=== Final ===
Rank	Athlete	Nationality	Result	Notes
1st place, gold medalist(s)	Tony Barton	United States	2.30	
2nd place, silver medalist(s)	Stevan Zorić	Independent Participants	2.30	
3rd place, bronze medalist(s)	Arturo Ortíz	Spain	2.27	
3rd place, bronze medalist(s)	Ruslan Stipanov	Ukraine	2.27	
5	Jean-Charles Gicquel	France	2.24	
5	Lee Jin-taek	South Korea	2.24	
7	Brendan Reilly	Great Britain	2.24	
8	Ian Thompson	Bahamas	2.21	
8	Dragutin Topić	Independent Participants	2.21	
10	Randall Jenkins	United States	2.21	
10	Xu Xiaodong	China	2.21	
10	Alex Zaliauskas	Canada	2.21	
13	Xavier Robillard	France	2.18	
14	Aliaksandr Buglakou	Belarus	2.15	

^{1}All athletes from Yugoslavia entered the games as "Independent Participants" due to United Nations sanctions against the country.
