= 1995 World Championships in Athletics – Men's high jump =

These are the official results of the Men's High Jump event at the 1995 IAAF World Championships in Gothenburg, Sweden. There were a total number of 35 participating athletes, with two qualifying groups and the final held on Tuesday August 8, 1995.

== Schedule ==
- All times are Central European Time (UTC+1)

Qualification Round
Group A	Group B
06.08.1995 – 10:15h	06.08.1995 – 10:15h
Final Round
08.08.1995 – 16:30h

== Results ==
=== Qualifying round ===
- Held on Sunday 1995-08-06

Qualification: Qualifying Performance 2.29 (Q) or at least 12 best performers (q) advance to the final.

Rank	Group	Name	Nationality	2.00	2.10	2.15	2.20	2.24	2.27	2.29	Result	Notes
1	A	Steve Smith	Great Britain	–	–	–	xo	o	xxo	o	2.29	Q
2	A	Dragutin Topić	Yugoslavia								2.29	Q
2	A	Tony Barton	United States								2.29	Q
4	A	Troy Kemp	Bahamas								2.27	q
4	A	Steinar Hoen	Norway								2.27	q
6	A	Jarosław Kotewicz	Poland								2.27	q
7	A	Bi Hongyong	China								2.27	q
8	A	Sorin Matei	Romania								2.27	
9	A	Wolfgang Kreißig	Germany								2.24	
9	A	Gilmar Mayo	Colombia								2.24	
9	A	Dimitrios Kokotis	Greece								2.24	
12	A	Arturo Ortíz	Spain								2.24	
12	A	Lee Jin-taek	South Korea								2.24	
14	A	Chris Anderson	Australia								2.24	
15	A	Charles Lefrançois	Canada								2.15	
16	A	Mark Mandy	Ireland								2.15	
17	A	Robert Ruffini	Slovakia								2.10	
18	A	Antonio Pazzaglia	San Marino								2.00	
1	B	Tim Forsyth	Australia	–	–	–	o	xo	o	o	2.29	Q
2	B	Javier Sotomayor	Cuba								2.27	q
2	B	Patrik Sjöberg	Sweden								2.27	q
2	B	Artur Partyka	Poland								2.27	q
2	B	Ian Thompson	Bahamas								2.27	q
6	B	Charles Austin	United States								2.27	
7	B	Dalton Grant	Great Britain	–	–	o	xo	xo	xxo	xxx	2.27	
8	B	Lambros Papakostas	Greece								2.27	
9	B	Wolf-Hendrik Beyer	Germany								2.24	
9	B	Håkon Särnblom	Norway								2.24	
9	B	Brendan Reilly	Great Britain	–	–	–	o	o	xxx		2.24	
12	B	Konstantin Matusevich	Israel								2.24	
13	B	Khemraj Naiko	Mauritius								2.20	
14	B	Oleg Zhukovskiy	Belarus								2.20	
15	B	Rick Noji	United States								2.20	
16	B	Ralf Sonn	Germany								2.20	
	B	Juha Isolehto	Finland								NM	

=== Final ===
Rank	Name	Nationality	2.15	2.20	2.25	2.29	2.32	2.35	2.37	2.39	Result	Notes
1st place, gold medalist(s)	Troy Kemp	Bahamas	–	–	o	o	–	xo	xo	xxx	2.37	
2nd place, silver medalist(s)	Javier Sotomayor	Cuba	–	–	xxo	–	o	o	xxo	xxx	2.37	
3rd place, bronze medalist(s)	Artur Partyka	Poland	o	–	o	–	x–	o	xxx		2.35	
4	Steve Smith	Great Britain	–	–	–	o	–	xxo	xx–	x	2.35	
4	Steinar Hoen	Norway	–	o	o	o	o	xxo	xxx		2.35	
6	Patrik Sjöberg	Sweden	–	–	o	–	o	xxx			2.32	
7	Tony Barton	United States	–	o	o	o	xx–	–	x		2.29	
8	Dragutin Topić	Yugoslavia	o	–	o	xxx					2.25	
8	Tim Forsyth	Australia	–	o	o	xxx					2.25	
8	Jarosław Kotewicz	Poland	o	–	o	xxx					2.25	
11	Ian Thompson	Bahamas									2.25	
12	Bi Hongyong	China									2.15	

== See also ==
- 1993 Men's World Championships High Jump
- 1994 Men's European Championships High Jump
- 1996 Men's Olympic High Jump
- 1997 Men's World Championships High Jump
- 1998 Men's European Championships High Jump
