= 1990 World Junior Championships in Athletics – Men's high jump =

The men's high jump event at the 1990 World Junior Championships in Athletics was held in Plovdiv, Bulgaria, at Deveti Septemvri Stadium on 11 and 12 August.

== Medalists ==
Gold	Dragutin Topić; Yugoslavia
Silver	Tim Forsyth; Australia
Bronze	Stevan Zorić; Yugoslavia

== Results ==
=== Final ===
12 August

Rank	Name	Nationality	Result	Notes
1st place, gold medalist(s)	Dragutin Topić	Yugoslavia	2.37	WJR
2nd place, silver medalist(s)	Tim Forsyth	Australia	2.29	
3rd place, bronze medalist(s)	Stevan Zorić	Yugoslavia	2.26	
4	Hendrik Beyer	West Germany	2.23	
5	Aleksey Makurin	Soviet Union	2.20	
6	Georgi Minkovski	Bulgaria	2.17	
7	Andrew Davis	Australia	2.17	
8	Hirokazu Kasai	Japan	2.14	
9	Yoshiteru Kaihoko	Japan	2.14	
10	Khemraj Naiko	Mauritius	2.10	
11	Steinar Hoen	Norway	2.10	
12	Adam Mateja	Poland	2.10	

=== Qualifications ===
11 Aug

==== Group A ====
Rank	Name	Nationality	Result	Notes
1	Dragutin Topić	Yugoslavia	2.16	Q
2	Aleksey Makurin	Soviet Union	2.13	q
3	Andrew Davis	Australia	2.13	q
3	Steinar Hoen	Norway	2.13	q
5	Yoshiteru Kaihoko	Japan	2.13	q
6	Khemraj Naiko	Mauritius	2.13	q
7	Philippe Lami	France	2.10	
7	Brendan Reilly	United Kingdom	2.10	
7	Federico Rodeghiero	Italy	2.10	
10	Jason Munro	Canada	2.10	
11	Mike Greer	United States	2.10	
12	Alcides Silva	Brazil	2.10	
13	Hossein Shayan	Iran	2.05	
14	Dimítrios Kokitis	Greece	2.00	

==== Group B ====
Rank	Name	Nationality	Result	Notes
1	Hendrik Beyer	West Germany	2.16	Q
2	Tim Forsyth	Australia	2.16	Q
2	Georgi Minkovski	Bulgaria	2.16	Q
2	Hirokazu Kasai	Japan	2.16	Q
2	Stevan Zorić	Yugoslavia	2.16	Q
6	Adam Mateja	Poland	2.13	q
7	Didier Detchénique	France	2.13	
7	Eric Taylor-Perry	United States	2.13	
9	Alex Zaliauskas	Canada	2.10	
9	Steve Smith	United Kingdom	2.10	
11	Garreth Flowers	Bahamas	2.10	
12	Vladimir Minakov	Soviet Union	2.05	
13	Liao Hsueh-Sung	Chinese Taipei	2.05	

== Participation ==
According to an unofficial count, 27 athletes from 19 countries participated in the event.

- Australia (2)
- Bahamas (1)
- Brazil (1)
- Bulgaria (1)
- Canada (2)
- Chinese Taipei (1)
- France (2)
- Greece (1)
- Iran (1)
- Italy (1)
- Japan (2)
- Mauritius (1)
- Norway (1)
- Poland (1)
- Soviet Union (2)
- United Kingdom (2)
- United States (2)
- West Germany (1)
- Yugoslavia (2)
