= Noor Azhar Hamid =

Singaporean high jumper

Personal information
- Full name: Noor Azhar Abdul Hamid
- Nationality: Singapore
- Born: 8 February 1949 (age 77) Singapore
- Height: 1.82 m (6 ft 0 in)

Sport
- Sport: Athletics
- Event: High jump
- Club: Swift Athletes Association
- Coached by: Tan Eng Yoon; A. C. Abdeen

Achievements and titles
- Personal best: 2.12 m (1973)

Noor Azhar Abdul Hamid (born 8 February 1949) is a former Singaporean high jumper. His national record of 2.12 m (6 ft 11 1/4 in) set during the 1973 Southeast Asian Peninsular Games stood for 22 years until it was broken by Wong Yew Tong in 1995, and won him the 1974 Singapore National Olympic Council Sportsman of the Year award. In 1999, Noor Azhar was ranked 25th in a list of Singapore's 50 Greatest Athletes of the Century by The Straits Times.

== Athletics career ==
In 1966, the Whitley Secondary School student became the first schoolboy to clear 1.80 m (5 ft 10 3/4 in). A year later, Noor Azhar won a bronze medal at the 1967 Southeast Asian Peninsular Games with a jump of 1.91 m (6 ft 3 in).

In 1968, he broke S. Balakrishnan's national record set in 1963 with a jump of 1.965 m (6 ft 5 1/4 in). However, he was not included in the Singapore contingent for the 1968 Summer Olympics as the Singapore Amateur Athletic Association (SAAA) had failed to arrange trials for him nor nominate him for selection.

Noor Azhar won the high jump event at the 1969 Southeast Asian Peninsular Games with an effort of 1.94 m (6 ft 4 1/4 in). He qualified for the 1970 British Commonwealth Games in Edinburgh but finished well outside the medal spots in ninth place. The same year, he finished fifth with 2.00 m (6 ft 6 1/2 in) in the high jump event at the 1970 Asian Games in Bangkok.

By May 1971, Noor Azhar had raised his national record to 2.06 m (6 ft 9 in). In July 1971, he went for a three-month training cum competition course in West Germany. Despite exposure to the Fosbury Flop in Germany, and the increasing popularisation and adoption of the technique by other high jumpers, Noor Azhar stuck to the straddle that he would further refine while playing sepak takraw, throughout his career. As he had just recovered from an operation to remove cartilage from his right knee during his Germany attachment, Noor Azhar could only manage a height of 1.95 m (6 ft 4 3/4 in) in settling for the silver medal at the 1971 Southeast Asian Peninsular Games.

In 1972, Noor Azhar was sponsored by West Germany for the 1972 Summer Olympics in Munich, including a three-month pre-Olympic training and competition stint in Cologne, without the need to undergo qualifying trials. He cleared 2.00 m (6 ft 6 1/2 in) to place him a joint-33rd in the high jump.

He finally improved on his two-year-old national record with 2.08 m (6 ft 9 3/4 in) at the SAAA trials in May 1973. At the 1973 Southeast Asian Peninsular Games hosted by Singapore in September, he set a new games and national record with 2.12 m (6 ft 11 1/4 in) to secure the gold medal; his effort was also 0.04 m better than the 11-year-old Asian Games record by Japan's Kuniyoshi Sugioka, and the third best performance in Asia, behind Iran's Teymour Ghiasi (2.16 m) and Japan's Kazunori Koshikawa (2.15 m). This national record would stand for 22 years until Wong Yew Tong set a new mark of 2.15 m (7 ft 1/2 in) in March 1995. The achievement won him the 1974 Singapore National Olympic Council Sportsman of the Year.

Noor Azhar was Singapore's flag-bearer at the 1974 British Commonwealth Games in Christchurch. Despite achieving 2.14 m in practice, nerves got the better of him and he could only manage 2.08 m (6 ft 9 3/4 in) to finish sixth at the Games. At the 1974 Asian Games in Tehran, Noor Azhar equalled third-placed Yoshikazu Okuda's effort of 2.08 m (6 ft 9 3/4 in) in the high jump but missed out on the bronze medal on a countback. He won the high jump with 2.01 m (6 ft 7 in) at the 1975 Southeast Asian Peninsular Games after another countback.

He withdrew from the 1977 Southeast Asian Games as work commitments were affecting his training. He returned to competitive action in the 1978 Singapore Open, clearing 1.95 m (6 ft 4 3/4 in) for third place. With his decline, he was not selected for the 1978 Asian Games.

Noor Azhar qualified for the 1979 Southeast Asian Games but troubled by knee and hamstring injuries, he gave up after he failed his solitary attempt at 1.89 m (6 ft 2 1/4 in). He won the bronze medal at the 1981 Southeast Asian Games with an effort of 1.97 m (6 ft 5 1/2 in). In 1983, Noor Azhar finished fifth in the Southeast Asian Games held in Singapore as his decade-old game record was broken by Malaysia's Ramjit Nairu, who improved on the old mark by 0.01 cm.
