= 1988 World Junior Championships in Athletics – Men's high jump =

The men's high jump event at the 1988 World Junior Championships in Athletics was held in Sudbury, Ontario, Canada, at Laurentian University Stadium on 30 and 31 July.

== Medalists ==
Gold	Artur Partyka; Poland
Silver	Lámbros Papakóstas; Greece
Bronze	Park Jae-Hong; South Korea
Bronze	Jarosław Kotewicz; Poland

== Results ==
=== Final ===
31 July

Rank	Name	Nationality	Result	Notes
1st place, gold medalist(s)	Artur Partyka	Poland	2.28	
2nd place, silver medalist(s)	Lámbros Papakóstas	Greece	2.25	
3rd place, bronze medalist(s)	Park Jae-Hong	South Korea	2.22	
3rd place, bronze medalist(s)	Jarosław Kotewicz	Poland	2.22	
5	Hiroyuki Sakaida	Japan	2.19	
6	Carsten Korth	East Germany	2.19	
7	Mats Kollbrink	Sweden	2.12	
8	Miha Prijon	Yugoslavia	2.12	
9	Dimitri Maenhoudt	Belgium	2.12	
9	Patrick Thavelin	Sweden	2.12	
11	Walter Barney	United States	2.12	
12	Warren Lefebvre	Australia	2.12	
13	Takahisa Yoshida	Japan	2.08	

=== Qualifications ===
30 Jul

==== Group A ====
Rank	Name	Nationality	Result	Notes
1	Artur Partyka	Poland	2.14	Q
1	Mats Kollbrink	Sweden	2.14	Q
3	Lámbros Papakóstas	Greece	2.14	Q
4	Takahisa Yoshida	Japan	2.14	Q
5	Walter Barney	United States	2.14	Q
6	Dimitri Maenhoudt	Belgium	2.14	Q
6	Miha Prijon	Yugoslavia	2.14	Q
8	Alex Zaliauskas	Canada	2.05	
9	Lluis Orona Santz	Andorra	2.00	

==== Group B ====
Rank	Name	Nationality	Result	Notes
1	Warren Lefebvre	Australia	2.14	Q
1	Carsten Korth	East Germany	2.14	Q
1	Hiroyuki Sakaida	Japan	2.14	Q
4	Park Jae-Hong	South Korea	2.14	Q
5	Jarosław Kotewicz	Poland	2.14	Q
6	Patrick Thavelin	Sweden	2.14	Q
7	Orrin Barton	United States	2.10	
8	Steven Hollings	New Zealand	2.05	
	Jean-Claude Silao	Congo	NH	

== Participation ==
According to an unofficial count, 18 athletes from 14 countries participated in the event.

- Andorra (1)
- Australia (1)
- Belgium (1)
- Canada (1)
- Congo (1)
- East Germany (1)
- Greece (1)
- Japan (2)
- New Zealand (1)
- Poland (2)
- South Korea (1)
- Sweden (2)
- United States (2)
- Yugoslavia (1)
