= Rick Noji =

American high jumper (born 1967)

Personal information
- Born: October 22, 1967 (age 58) Seattle, Washington, United States

Rick Noji (born October 22, 1967, in Seattle) is an American retired high jumper.

== Early life ==
Born in Seattle in 1967, Noji is a third generation Japanese American. He graduated from Seattle's Franklin High School in 1985 and also attended the University of Washington.

== Athletic career ==
Standing at 5 ft 8 in (173 cm), Noji set a Washington state record of 7 feet 4 ½ inches in the high jump as a junior during the 1984 Metro League championships. As a senior, he won state titles in the high jump, long jump and 200 meters.

At the University of Washington, Noji was an All-American high-jumper and won a Pac-10 title in 1990. He finished third at the NCAA outdoor championships in 1990.

Noji finished eighth at the 1991 World Championships. He also competed at the 1993 and 1995 World Championships without reaching the final.

Noji's personal best jump is 2.31 metres, achieved in February 1992 in Long Beach. He was inducted into the University of Washington's Husky Hall of Fame in 1999.

== Post-athletics ==
After retirement, Noji entered the private sector. He is currently employed in the data center industry and is on the leadership team at Green House Data.
