= Chris Anderson (high jumper) =

Australian high jumper

Personal information
- Nationality: Australian
- Born: 6 April 1968 (age 57) Subiaco, Western Australia
- Height: 189 cm (6 ft 2 in)
- Weight: 74 kg (163 lb)

Sport
- Sport: Athletics
- Event: high jump
- Club: Curtin Athletic Foundation

Christopher Daniel Anderson (born 6 April 1968) is an Australian retired high jumper. He competed at the 1995 World Championships and the 1996 Olympic Games.

His personal best jump is 2.28 metres, achieved in December 1994 in Perth.

Anderson finished second behind Steve Smith in the high jump event at the British 1995 AAA Championships.
