= Athletics at the 1994 Commonwealth Games – Men's high jump =

Men's high jump at the Commonwealth Games

The men's high jump event at the 1994 Commonwealth Games was held on 23 and 26 August at the Centennial Stadium in Victoria, British Columbia.

== Medalists ==
Gold	Silver	Bronze
Tim Forsyth; Australia	Steve Smith; England	Geoff Parsons; Scotland

== Results ==
=== Qualification ===
Qualification: 2.25 (Q) or 12 best performers (q) advance to the Final.

Rank	Group	Name	Nationality	2.00	2.05	2.10	2.15	2.20	Result	Notes
1	A	Geoff Parsons	Scotland	–	–	o	o	o	2.20	q
1	A	Lochsley Thomson	Australia						2.20	q
1	A	Steve Smith	England	–	–	o	o	o	2.20	q
4	A	Marcus George	Saint Lucia						2.20	q
5	A	Cory Siermachesky	Canada						2.20	q
6	A	Loo Kum Zee	Malaysia				o		2.15	q
6	A	Khemraj Naiko	Mauritius			o	o		2.15	q
8	A	Jagan Hames	Australia						2.15	
9	A	Lou Cwee Peng	Malaysia						2.10	
10	A	Raymond Solomon	British Virgin Islands						2.05	
22	A	Rupert Charles	Dominica						2.00	
	A	Troy Kemp	Bahamas						DNS	
1	B	Tim Forsyth	Australia						2.20	q
1	B	Brendan Reilly	England						2.20	q
1	B	Ian Thompson	Bahamas						2.20	q
4	B	Richard Duncan	Canada						2.20	q
4	B	Dalton Grant	England	–	–	x			2.20	q
6	B	Simon Kiprotich Rutto	Kenya						2.15	
7	B	Charles Lefrançois	Canada						2.15	
8	B	Stephen Woodley	Bermuda						2.05	
8	B	Gerrit van Rooyen	Namibia						2.05	
10	B	Kwaku Boateng	Ghana						2.05	
21	B	James Rolle	Bahamas						2.05	
22	B	Rohaan Simons	Bermuda						2.00	
	B	Jacob Katonon	Kenya						DNS	

=== Final ===
Rank	Name	Nationality	2.10	2.15	2.20	2.25	2.28	2.31	2.34	2.34	2.32	2.34	2.32	Result	Notes
1st place, gold medalist(s)	Tim Forsyth	Australia	–	–	o	o	–	xo	xxx	x	o	x	o	2.32	
2nd place, silver medalist(s)	Steve Smith	England	–	–	–	o	–	xo	xxx	x	o	x	x	2.32	
3rd place, bronze medalist(s)	Geoff Parsons	Scotland		o	xo	o	xxo	xxo	xxx					2.31	PB
4	Cory Siermachesky	Canada						xx						2.28	PB
5	Dalton Grant	England	–	–	xo	o	xo	xx–	x					2.28	
6	Lochsley Thomson	Australia												2.28	
7	Richard Duncan	Canada	–	o	o	o	–	xx						2.25	PB
7	Brendan Reilly	England				o	xx–	x						2.25	
9	Ian Thompson	Bahamas												2.25	
10	Loo Kum Zee	Malaysia												2.15	
11	Marcus George	Saint Lucia												2.15	
12	Khemraj Naiko	Mauritius												2.10	
