= Jan Janků =

Czech high jumper

Jan Janků (born 10 August 1971 in Česká Lípa) is a former Czech high jumper.

His personal bests are 2.30 m indoors and 2.29 m outdoors. His younger brother Tomáš Janků is also a prominent high jumper.

He is married to Katerina Babova, a sister of the high jumper Jaroslav Bába. The couple has one son, Jan Junior, born in 2007.

== Achievements ==
Year	Competition	Venue	Position	Notes
Representing Czech Republic
1996	European Indoor Championships	Stockholm, Sweden	7th	2.24 m
1997	World Indoor Championships	Paris, France	20th (q)	2.20 m
1997	World Championships	Athens, Greece	12th	2.25 m
1998	European Indoor Championships	Valencia, Spain	4th	2.26 m
1999	World Championships	Seville, Spain	18th (q)	2.23 m
2000	European Indoor Championships	Ghent, Belgium	17th (q)	2.16 m
2001	Jeux de la Francophonie	Ottawa, Canada	3rd	2.21 m
2001	World Championships	Edmonton, Canada	13th (q)	2.25 m
2002	European Championships	Munich, Germany	8th	2.22 m
