= Jean-Charles Gicquel =

French high jumper (born 1967)

Personal information
- Born: 24 February 1967 (age 59) Ploërmel, France

Sport
- Sport: Track and field
Medal record
Representing France
Mediterranean Games
Gold medal – first place	1993 Narbonne	High jump
European Indoor Championships
Silver medal – second place	1994 Paris	High jump

Jean-Charles Gicquel (born 24 February 1967) is a retired high jumper from France, who set his personal best (2.35 m) on 13 March 1994 in Paris. He is a four-time national champion for France in the men's high jump event.

== International competitions ==
Year	Competition	Venue	Position	Notes
Representing France
1985	European Junior Championships	Cottbus, East Germany	14th	2.10 m
1987	Universiade	Zagreb, Yugoslavia	13th	2.15 m
1987	World Championships	Rome, Italy	27th (q)	2.10 m
1989	European Indoor Championships	The Hague, Netherlands	7th	2.24 m
1989	World Indoor Championships	Budapest, Hungary	12th	2.25 m
1989	Jeux de la Francophonie	Casablanca, Morocco	1st	2.22 m
1989	Universiade	Duisburg, West Germany	8th	2.20 m
1990	European Championships	Split, Yugoslavia	13th (q)	2.24 m
1991	Mediterranean Games	Athens, Greece	8th	2.15 m
1993	Mediterranean Games	Narbonne, France	1st	2.26 m
1993	Universiade	Buffalo, United States	5th	2.24 m
1993	World Championships	Stuttgart, Germany	11th	2.25 m
1994	European Indoor Championships	Paris, France	2nd	2.35 m
1994	European Championships	Helsinki, Finland	9th	2.25 m
