= Steinar Hoen =

Norwegian high jumper (born 1971)

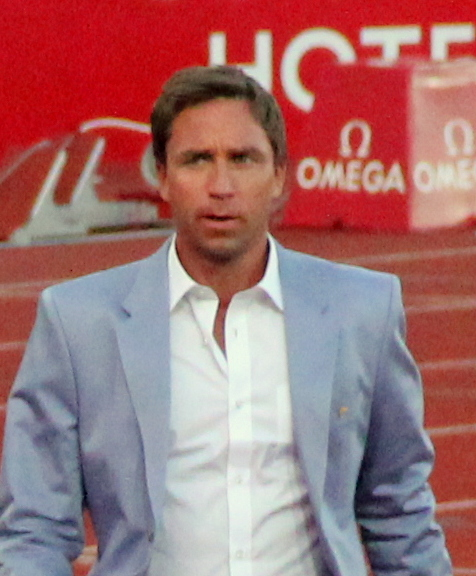
- Hoen at 2012 Bislett Games

Personal information
- Born: 8 February 1971 (age 55) Oslo, Norway
Medal record
Men's athletics
Representing Norway
European Championships
Gold medal – first place	1994 Helsinki	High jump
European Indoor Championships
Bronze medal – third place	1996 Stockholm	High jump

Steinar Hoen (born 8 February 1971) is a retired Norwegian high jumper. He represented IK Tjalve during his senior career. He has been the meeting director for the Bislett Games since 2007. His indoor and outdoor bests are both 2.36 m – these are also the Norwegian records for the event.

== Career ==
In his early career he finished eleventh at the 1990 World Junior Championships, fourteenth at the 1991 World Championships, ninth at the 1992 European Indoor Championships and ninth at the 1993 IAAF World Indoor Championships. He competed at the 1992 Summer Olympics together with Håkon Särnblom without reaching the finals.

In 1994 he finished fourth at the European Indoor Championships before winning the European Championships in August with a jump of 2.35 metres. This result was a competition record for exactly twelve years, until Andrey Silnov surpassed it by 2.36 m.

Hoen came close to medals in 1995, with fourth places from both the World Indoor Championships and World Championships, before he won another European medal with a bronze medal at the 1996 European Indoor Championships. He then finished fifth at the 1996 Summer Olympics, eighth at the 1997 IAAF World Indoor Championships, fourth at the 1997 World Championships and sixth at the 1998 European Championships. He became Norwegian champion in the years 1991 and 1993–1998.

His personal best jump was 2.36 metres, achieved in July 1997 in Oslo. This is the current Norwegian record. He cleared 2.30 metres or more 32 times, whereas Särnblom only cleared this height or more twice. Hoen already had a personal indoor best of 2.36 m, from February 1994 in Balingen.

Hoen intended to make a brief comeback at the 2006 Norwegian championships, but failed to show up at the competition.

He lives at Strand.

== Competition record ==
Year	Competition	Venue	Position	Notes
Representing Norway
1989	European Junior Championships	Varaždin, Yugoslavia	12th	2.14 m
1990	World Junior Championships	Plovdiv, Bulgaria	11th	2.10 m
1991	World Championships	Tokyo, Japan	14th	2.20 m
1992	European Indoor Championships	Genoa, Italy	9th	2.23 m
1992	Olympic Games	Barcelona, Spain	15th (q)	2.23 m
1993	World Indoor Championships	Toronto, Canada	9th	2.24 m
1993	World Championships	Stuttgart, Germany	15th (q)	2.25 m
1994	European Indoor Championships	Paris, France	4th	2.31 m
1994	European Championships	Helsinki, Finland	1st	2.35 m
1995	World Indoor Championships	Barcelona, Spain	4th	2.32 m
1995	World Championships	Gothenburg, Sweden	4th	2.35 m
1996	European Indoor Championships	Stockholm, Sweden	3rd	2.31 m
1996	Olympic Games	Atlanta, United States	5th	2.32 m
1997	World Indoor Championships	Paris, France	8th	2.25 m
1997	World Championships	Athens, Greece	4th	2.30 m
1998	Goodwill Games	Uniondale, United States	4th	2.25 m
1998	European Championships	Budapest, Hungary	6th	2.30 m
