= Roberto Ferrari (athlete) =

Italian high jumper

Personal information
- Nationality: Italian
- Born: 24 March 1967 (age 59) Cremona, Italy

Sport
- Country: Italy
- Sport: Athletics
- Event: High jump

Achievements and titles
- Personal best: High jump: 2.30 m (1993)

Roberto Ferrari (born 24 March 1967) is a retired Italian high jumper.

== Biography ==
He was born in Cremona. He became Italian high jump champion in 1992 and 1994, rivalling Fabrizio Borellini and Ettore Ceresoli. He also became indoor champion in 1993. He competed at the 1993 World Indoor Championships, the 1993 World Championships, the 1994 European Indoor Championships and the 1994 European Championships without reaching the final.

His personal best jump is 2.30 metres, achieved in June 1993 in Rome.

== National titles ==
Roberto Ferrari has won 3 times the individual national championship.

- 2 wins in high jump (1992, 1994)
- 1 win in high jump indoor (1993)

== See also ==
- Italian all-time top lists - High jump
