= Shawn Mills =

American technology entrepreneur

Shawn Ellis Mills
- Born: May 1966; 59 years ago Fort Worth, Texas, United States
- Education: University of Texas at Austin
- Occupation: Entrepreneur
- Known for: Co-founder and former president of Lunavi
- Spouse: Amy Mills

Shawn Mills is an American technology entrepreneur and the co-founder and former president of Lunavi. Mills started his career with the founding of a VoIP company that was acquired during the internet boom of the late 1990s.

== Early life and education ==
Born in Fort Worth, Texas in 1966, Mills graduated from Southwest High School where he played baseball. He later attended the University of Texas at Austin, where he earned a bachelor's degree in Business Administration in Finance.

== Career ==
In 1998, Mills co-founded and raised $4.25 million in venture capital for an early free PC-to-Phone VoIP service, Televant, Inc. Under Televant, Mills and his partner also operated the website Callrewards.com, an online rewards and loyalty program. The properties were acquired in 2000 by PhoneFree.com for undisclosed financial terms. PhoneFree.com subsequently merged with iDial Networks, where Mills stayed on as the Senior Vice President of Product Development and Product Marketing.

After relocating to Jackson Hole, Wyoming, Mills worked in other early-stage companies until founding Green House Data in Cheyenne in 2007. He served as CEO until Mills, the largest shareholder, and the Board of Directors hired Board chairman Sam Galeotos to take the chief executive role. He currently serves as president. Under Mills leadership, the company had undergone rapid expansion, acquiring seven companies in six years, opening data centers in Wyoming, Oregon, New Jersey, New York, and in Washington state.

== Sustainability ==
"As Google and other industry giants invest in renewables, they're lighting the way for sustainable business on a larger scale," said Mills in the Christian Science Monitor. In 2016 Green House Data ranked on the EPA's Top 30 Tech & Telecom Green Power Partnership list, purchasing 15,675,000 kWh of renewable energy credits annually.

During Mills's tenure, Green House Data became the first B Corp in Wyoming.

== Leadership and recognition ==
In 2013, Mills received the Spirit of Wyoming Award from the Small Business Administration. He frequently spoke at industry events, like the Association for Data Center Management Professionals (AFCOM).

Mills is a member of the Young Presidents' Organization a global network of young chief executives with approximately 22,000 members in more than 125 countries. In 2017, Mills was awarded the Colorado Technology Association's CEO of the Year award. He was honored again in 2021 with the Colorado Entrepreneur Excellence Award.

== Political activity ==
During the 2018 Wyoming Legislative session, Mills worked with advocacy groups to pass Wyoming State Senate Enrolled Act 0048, which adds computer science and computational thinking to the state educational program.

Sam Galeotos, who was named to Green House Data's board in 2016, ran in the 2018 Wyoming gubernatorial election as a pro-Trump candidate, earning just 12% of the vote. Mills had endorsed Galeotos.
