= Athletics at the 1996 Summer Olympics – Men's high jump =

Men's high jump at the Games of the XXVI Olympiad
- Pictogram for athletics
- Venues: Centennial Olympic Stadium
- Dates: July 26 (qualifications); July 28 (final)
- Competitors: 37 from 27 nations
- Winning height: 2.39 OR

Medalists
1st place, gold medalist(s)		Charles Austin; United States
2nd place, silver medalist(s)		Artur Partyka; Poland
3rd place, bronze medalist(s)		Steve Smith; Great Britain

The men's high jump was an event at the 1996 Summer Olympics in Atlanta, Georgia. There were 38 competitors from 28 nations, with one non-starter (three-time medalist Patrik Sjöberg). The maximum number of athletes per nation had been set at 3 since the 1930 Olympic Congress. The event was won by Charles Austin of the United States, the nation's first victory in the men's high jump since 1968 and 13th overall. Artur Partyka of Poland became the seventh man to win two medals in the event, following his 1992 bronze with silver in these Games. Steve Smith's bronze was Great Britain's first medal in the men's high jump since 1908.

== Background ==
This was the 23rd appearance of the event, which is one of 12 athletics events to have been held at every Summer Olympics. The returning finalists from the 1992 Games were gold medalist Javier Sotomayor of Cuba, bronze medalists Artur Partyka of Poland and Tim Forsyth of Australia, seventh-place finisher Troy Kemp of the Bahamas, eighth-place finishers Charles Austin of the United States and Dragutin Topić of Yugoslavia (an Independent Olympic Participant in 1992), and twelfth-place finisher Steve Smith of Great Britain. Sotomayor had broken his own world record in 1993, jumping 2.45 metres for a mark that is still standing as of 2023; however, he was suffering from an ankle injury in Atlanta. Austin, by contrast, had recovered from injuries that had limited him. Kemp was the reigning world champion, while Partyka had placed in the top three at worlds in both 1993 and 1995.

Colombia, the Czech Republic, the Dominican Republic, Malaysia, and Ukraine each made their debut in the event. The United States made its 22nd appearance, most of any nation, having missed only the boycotted 1980 Games.

== Competition format ==
The competition used the two-round format introduced in 1912. There were two distinct rounds of jumping with results cleared between rounds. Jumpers were eliminated if they had three consecutive failures, whether at a single height or between multiple heights if they attempted to advance before clearing a height.

The qualifying round had the bar set at 2.10 metres, 2.15 metres, 2.20 metres, 2.24 metres, 2.26 metres, and 2.29 metres. All jumpers clearing 2.29 metres in the qualifying round advanced to the final. If fewer than 12 jumpers could achieve it, the top 12 (including ties) would advance to the final.

The final had jumps at 2.15 metres, 2.20 metres, 2.25 metres, 2.29 metres, 2.32 metres, 2.35 metres, 2.37 metres, 2.39 metres, and 2.41 metres; the winner also took attempts at 2.46 metres to try to break the world record.

== Records ==
These were the standing world and Olympic records (in metres) prior to the 1996 Summer Olympics.

World record	Javier Sotomayor (CUB)	2.45	Salamanca, Spain	27 July 1993
Olympic record	Hennadiy Avdyeyenko (URS)	2.38	Seoul, South Korea	25 September 1988

Charles Austin set a new Olympic record with 2.39 metres.

== Schedule ==
All times are Eastern Daylight Time (UTC-4)

Date	Time	Round
Friday, 26 July 1996	9:00	Qualifying
Sunday, 28 July 1996	18:00	Final

== Results ==
Key

- o = Height cleared
- x = Height failed
- – = Height passed
- r = Retired
- SB = Season's best
- PB = Personal best
- NR = National record
- AR = Area record
- OR = Olympic record
- WR = World record
- WL = World lead
- NM = No mark
- DNS = Did not start
- DQ = Disqualified

=== Qualifying round ===
Qualification: Qualifying Performance 2.28 (Q) or at least 12 best performers (q) advance to the final.

Rank	Group	Athlete	Nation	2.10	2.15	2.20	2.24	2.26	2.28	Height	Notes
1	A	Charles Austin	United States	–	–	o	–	o	o	2.28	Q
1	B	Tim Forsyth	Australia	–	–	o	o	o	o	2.28	Q
1	B	Artur Partyka	Poland	–	–	o	–	o	o	2.28	Q
1	B	Dragutin Topić	FR Yugoslavia	–	–	o	o	o	o	2.28	Q
5	A	Steinar Hoen	Norway	–	o	o	o	xxo	o	2.28	Q
6	A	Troy Kemp	Bahamas	–	o	–	o	o	xo	2.28	Q
6	A	Jarosław Kotewicz	Poland	–	o	–	o	o	xo	2.28	Q
6	A	Lambros Papakostas	Greece	–	–	o	o	o	xo	2.28	Q
9	A	Lee Jin-taek	South Korea	–	o	xo	o	o	xo	2.28	Q
9	B	Javier Sotomayor	Cuba	–	–	o	–	xo	xo	2.28	Q
11	A	Steve Smith	Great Britain	–	o	–	xo	xo	xo	2.28	Q
11	B	Wolfgang Kreißig	Germany	–	o	xo	xo	o	xo	2.28	Q
13	A	Tomáš Janků	Czech Republic	o	o	o	o	xo	xxo	2.28	Q
13	A	Przemysław Radkiewicz	Poland	–	o	o	xo	o	xxo	2.28	Q
15	A	Charles Lefrançois	Canada	–	o	o	o	o	xxx	2.26	
16	B	Viacheslav Tyrtyshnik	Ukraine	o	o	o	xo	o	xxx	2.26	
17	B	Konstantin Matusevich	Israel	–	xo	o	xxo	o	xxx	2.26	
18	B	Arturo Ortíz	Spain	–	o	o	xo	xo	xxx	2.26	
19	B	Dalton Grant	Great Britain	o	o	xo	xo	xo	xxx	2.26	
20	B	Ian Thompson	Bahamas	–	o	–	xo	xxo	xxx	2.26	
21	B	Gilmar Mayo	Colombia	–	o	xo	xo	xxo	xxx	2.26	
22	B	Marko Turban	Estonia	–	xo	o	o	xxx	—	2.24	
23	A	Mark Mandy	Ireland	o	o	o	xxx	—		2.20	
24	B	Khemraj Naiko	Mauritius	o	o	xo	xxx	—		2.20	
25	A	Julio Luciano	Dominican Republic	o	xo	xo	xxx	—		2.20	
26	A	Cameron Wright	United States	o	o	xxo	xxx	—		2.20	
27	A	Chris Anderson	Australia	o	o	xxx	—			2.15	
27	A	Tomohiro Nomura	Japan	o	o	xxx	—			2.15	
27	A	Stevan Zorić	FR Yugoslavia	–	o	xxx	—			2.15	
30	B	Loo Kum Zee	Malaysia	xo	o	xxx	—			2.15	
31	B	Ed Broxterman	United States	xxo	o	xxx	—			2.15	
32	A	Kim Tae-hoi	South Korea	xo	xxo	xxx	—			2.15	
33	B	Cho Hyun-wook	South Korea	o	xxx	—				2.10	
34	B	Fakhredin Fouad	Jordan	xxo	xxx	—				2.10	
—	A	Hugo Muñoz	Peru	xxx	—					No mark	
—	A	Wong Yew Tong	Singapore	xxx	—					No mark	
—	B	Olivier Sanou	Burkina Faso	xxx	—					No mark	
—	B	Patrik Sjöberg	Sweden	DNS							

=== Final ===
Rank	Athlete	Nation	2.15	2.20	2.25	2.29	2.32	2.35	2.37	2.39	2.41	2.46	Height	Notes
1st place, gold medalist(s)	Charles Austin	United States	o	–	o	–	o	o	xx–	o	–	xxx	2.39	OR
2nd place, silver medalist(s)	Artur Partyka	Poland	–	o	–	o	–	o	xo	x–	xx	—	2.37	
3rd place, bronze medalist(s)	Steve Smith	Great Britain	–	–	xo	–	o	xo	xx–	x	—		2.35	
4	Dragutin Topić	FR Yugoslavia	–	o	o	o	o	xx–	x	—			2.32	
5	Steinar Hoen	Norway	–	o	o	xo	o	xx–	x	—			2.32	
6	Lambros Papakostas	Greece	–	o	o	o	xo	xx–	x	—			2.32	
7	Tim Forsyth	Australia	–	o	o	o	xxo	xx–	x	—			2.32	
8	Lee Jin-taek	South Korea	–	xo	o	o	xxx	—					2.29	
9	Wolfgang Kreißig	Germany	–	xo	xo	o	xxx	—					2.29	
10	Przemysław Radkiewicz	Poland	–	xo	xo	xo	xxx	—					2.29	
11	Jarosław Kotewicz	Poland	o	–	o	xxx	—						2.25	
12	Javier Sotomayor	Cuba	–	–	o	–	xxx	—					2.25	
13	Troy Kemp	Bahamas	–	–	xo	–	x–	xx	—				2.25	
14	Tomáš Janků	Czech Republic	xo	xo	xo	xx	—						2.25	

== See also ==
- 1994 Men's European Championships (Helsinki)
- 1995 Men's World Championships (Gothenburg)
- 1997 Men's World Championships (Athens)
- 1998 Men's European Championships (Budapest)
