= Ed Broxterman =

American high jumper

Edgar "Ed" Broxterman (born November 28, 1973, in Baileyville, Kansas) is an American retired high jumper.

He competed at the 1996 Olympic Games without reaching the final. He took second at the 1996 US Olympic Trials. In the 1995 NCAA Outdoor Championships, he jumped 7'4 1/2" to finish second.

His personal best jump is 2.30 metres (7'6 1/2"), achieved in June 1996 at the US Olympic Trials in Atlanta.

Broxterman attended Kansas State University and was one of the first members of what is now considered High Jump U. He also still holds the Kansas State Class 1A Long Jump record at 23'. He is currently working for Evergy in Shawnee, Kansas.

== See also ==
- World Fit
