= Cameron Wright (athlete) =

American high jumper (born 1972)

Cameron Wright (born November 7, 1972) a retired American high jumper.

He competed at the 1996 Olympic Games without reaching the final.

His personal best jump is 2.30 metres, achieved in June 1996, in Atlanta.

- Missouri Valley Conference outdoor record holder (2.27 m)
- Southern Illinois University 2011, Hall of Fame.
- 5-time NCAA ALL-AMERICAN

Head coach - Track and Field

- Southern Illinois University
