= 1989 European Athletics Indoor Championships – Men's high jump =

The men's high jump event at the 1989 European Athletics Indoor Championships was held on 19 February.

== Results ==
Rank	Name	Nationality	2.00	2.05	2.10	2.15	2.20	2.24	2.27	2.30	2.33	2.36	Result	Notes
1st place, gold medalist(s)	Dietmar Mögenburg	West Germany	–	–	–	–	o	o	o	xo	xo		2.33	
2nd place, silver medalist(s)	Dalton Grant	Great Britain	–	–	–	–	o	xo	–	o	xxo		2.33	
3rd place, bronze medalist(s)	Aleksey Yemelin	Soviet Union	–	–	–	o	o	o	–	xo	xx		2.30	
4	Ralf Sonn	West Germany	–	–	o	o	o	o	xo	xxx			2.27	
5	Sorin Matei	Romania	–	–	–	o	xo	–	xo	xxx			2.27	
6	Sergey Malchenko	Soviet Union											2.24	
7	Jean-Charles Gicquel	France											2.24	
8	Panagiotis Kontaxakis	Greece											2.24	
9	Georgi Dakov	Bulgaria											2.20	
10	Artur Partyka	Poland											2.20	
11	John Holman	Great Britain											2.20	
12	Gisle Ellingsen	Norway											2.15	
12	Labros Papakostas	Greece											2.15	
14	Dominique Hernandez	France											2.15	
