= Cho Hyun-wook =

South Korean high jumper (born 1970)

Medal record

Men's athletics

Representing South Korea

Asian Championships
Gold medal – first place	1989 New Delhi	High jump
Silver medal – second place	1987 Singapore	High jump

- Cho Hyun-wook
- Hangul: 조현욱
- RR: Jo Hyeonuk
- MR: Cho Hyŏnuk

Cho Hyun-wook (Korean: 조현욱; born 15 March 1970) is a retired South Korean high jumper.

He won the silver medal at the 1987 Asian Athletics Championships and the gold medal at the 1989 Asian Athletics Championships.

He competed at the 1988, 1992 and 1996 Olympic Games, but did not reach the final.

His personal best jump is 2.28 metres, achieved in May 1992 in Seoul.
