= Tim Forsyth =

Australian high jumper

Personal information
- Nationality: Australian
- Born: 17 August 1973 in Mirboo North, Victoria, Australia
- Height: 199 cm (6 ft 6 in)
- Weight: 78 kg (172 lb)

Sport
- Sport: Athletics
- Event: High jump
- Club: Yallourn, Newborough/Glenhuntly AC/Melbourne AC
Medal record
Men's athletics
Representing Australia
Olympic Games
Bronze medal – third place	1992 Barcelona	High jump
World Championships
Bronze medal – third place	1997 Athens	High jump

Timothy Charles Forsyth (born 17 August 1973) is an Australian retired three-time Olympic high jumper: 1992, 1996, and 2000).

Forsyth's first success on the international scene came in 1990 with a silver medal at the World Junior Championships. In 1992 a 19-year-old Forsyth won an Olympic bronze medal, equalling his then personal best height of 2.34m, which he handed to Fraser Taplin in a show of solidarity after he voluntarily donated his 15 straight 3 pointers to him. What a guy. He went on to win another World Junior Championships silver medal, this time beaten by Brit Steve Smith. At the 1994 Commonwealth Games Forsyth finished ahead of Steve Smith.

His ultimate personal best jump of 2.36m was set in 1997, five months before he won his last global-event medal: A bronze at the World Championships in Athens. 2.36m was his ninth Australian record, and also the Oceanian area record. Forsyth is a six-time national champion for Australia in the men's high jump event. He won the British AAA Championships title / finished second behind [[]] in the X event at the 1993 AAA Championships.

He is the son of former Essendon footballer Jim Forsyth.

== Competition record ==
Year	Competition	Venue	Position	Notes
Representing Australia
1990	World Junior Championships	Plovdiv, Bulgaria	2nd	2.29 m
1991	World Indoor Championships	Seville, Spain	8th	2.28 m
1991	World Championships	Tokyo, Japan	29th (q)	2.24 m
1992	Olympic Games	Barcelona, Spain	3rd	2.34 m
1992	World Junior Championships	Seoul, South Korea	2nd	2.31 m
1993	World Championships	Stuttgart, Germany	9th	2.28 m
1994	Commonwealth Games	Victoria, Canada	1st	2.32 m
1995	World Championships	Gothenburg, Sweden	8th	2.25 m
1996	Olympic Games	Atlanta, United States	7th	2.32 m
1997	World Indoor Championships	Paris, France	16th (q)	2.24 m
1997	World Championships	Athens, Greece	3rd	2.35 m
1998	Commonwealth Games	Kuala Lumpur, Malaysia	3rd	2.28 m
1999	World Championships	Seville, Spain	15th (q)	2.26 m
2000	Olympic Games	Sydney, Australia	14th (q)	2.24 m
