= Jarosław Kotewicz =

Polish high jumper

Jarosław Kotewicz (born March 16, 1969, in Iława) is a retired Polish high jumper. His personal best jump is 2.30 metres, achieved in August 1995 in Zurich.

== Competition record ==
Year	Competition	Venue	Position	Notes
Representing Poland
1986	World Junior Championships	Athens, Greece	17th (q)	2.06 m
1987	European Junior Championships	Birmingham, United Kingdom	3rd	2.15 m
1988	World Junior Championships	Sudbury, Canada	3rd	2.22 m
1991	World Championships	Tokyo, Japan	32nd (q)	2.15 m
1994	European Championships	Helsinki, Finland	5th	2.31 m
1995	World Championships	Gothenburg, Sweden	8th	2.25 m
1996	European Indoor Championships	Stockholm, Sweden	5th	2.29 m
1996	Olympic Games	Atlanta, United States	11th	2.25 m
1997	World Indoor Championships	Paris, France	6th	2.25 m
1997	World Championships	Athens, Greece	21st (q)	2.23 m
