= Khemraj Naiko =

Mauritian high jumper

Personal information
- Born: 23 August 1972 (age 54)

Sport
- Sport: Track and field
Medal record
Representing Mauritius
African Championships
Gold medal – first place	1996 Yaoundé	High jump
Silver medal – second place	1993 Durban	High jump
Silver medal – second place	1998 Dakar	High jump
Bronze medal – third place	1990 Cairo	High jump
Bronze medal – third place	1992 Belle Vue Harel	High jump
Bronze medal – third place	2004 Brazzaville	High jump

Khemraj Naiko (born 23 August 1972) is a retired Mauritian high jumper.

His personal best jump is 2.28 metres, achieved at the 1998 Commonwealth Games in Kuala Lumpur. This is the Mauritian record.

== International competitions ==
Year	Competition	Venue	Position	Notes
Representing Mauritius
1990	African Championships	Cairo, Egypt	3rd	2.09 m
1990	World Junior Championships	Plovdiv, Bulgaria	10th	2.10 m
1991	Universiade	Sheffield, United Kingdom	17th (q)	2.05 m
1992	African Championships	Belle Vue, Mauritius	3rd	2.16 m
1992	Olympic Games	Barcelona, Spain	33rd (q)	2.10 m
1993	African Championships	Durban, South Africa	2nd	2.19 m
1994	Jeux de la Francophonie	Bondoufle, France	5th	2.16 m
1994	Commonwealth Games	Victoria, Canada	12th	2.10 m
1995	World Championships	Gothenburg, Sweden	27th (q)	2.20 m
1995	All-Africa Games	Harare, Zimbabwe	2nd	2.19 m
1996	African Championships	Yaoundé, Cameroon	1st	2.16 m
1996	Olympic Games	Atlanta, United States	24th (q)	2.20 m
1997	World Championships	Athens, Greece	35th (q)	2.15 m
1997	Jeux de la Francophonie	Antananarivo, Madagascar	2nd	2.23 m
1998	African Championships	Dakar, Senegal	2nd	2.18 m
1998	Commonwealth Games	Kuala Lumpur, Malaysia	4th	2.28 m
1999	All-Africa Games	Johannesburg, South Africa	4th	2.20 m
2001	Jeux de la Francophonie	Ottawa, Canada	7th	2.10 m
2003	All-Africa Games	Abuja, Nigeria	4th	2.10 m
2003	Afro-Asian Games	Hyderabad, India	5th	2.05 m
2004	African Championships	Brazzaville, Congo	3rd	2.10 m

Olympic Games
Preceded by ?	Flagbearer for Mauritius; Atlanta 1996	Succeeded by Michael Macaque
