= Xavier Robilliard =

French high jumper

Xavier Robilliard (born 13 June 1967) is a retired French high jumper.

He competed at the 1993 World Championships without reaching the final. Robilliard became French champion in 1993 and French indoor champion in 1992. His personal best was 2.28 metres, achieved in July 1993 in Vénissieux.
