= Dalton Grant =

British high jumper (born 1966)

Personal information
- Nationality: British (English)
- Born: 8 April 1966 (age 60) Hackney, Greater London, England
- Height: 186 cm (6 ft 1 in)
- Weight: 73 kg (161 lb)

Sport
- Sport: Athletics
- Event: High jump
- Club: Haringey AC
Medal record
Men's athletics
Representing Great Britain
European Championships
| Silver medal – second place | 1998 Budapest | High jump |
Representing England
Commonwealth Games
| Silver medal – second place | 1990 Auckland | high jump |
| Gold medal – first place | 1998 Kuala Lumpur | high jump |

Dalton Grant (born 8 April 1966) is a former high jumper who competed at three Olympic Games.

== Biography ==
Grant was born in Hackney to parents from Jamaica and lived in Brooke Road, Upper Clapton. He went to Hackney Downs School where he started to high jump. He also represented Hackney in the London Youth Games in athletics.

Grant won a total number of four national titles for Great Britain (AAA Championships) in the men's high jump event. His personal best jump is 2.36 metres, achieved at the 1991 World Championships in Tokyo. He has a personal indoor best of 2.37 metres.

Grant appeared at five consecutive Commonwealth Games. He represented England in the high jump, at the 1986 Commonwealth Games in Edinburgh, Scotland. Four years later he won a silver medal for England, at the 1990 Commonwealth Games in Auckland, New Zealand which was followed by a third Games appearance for England, at the 1994 Commonwealth Games in Victoria, British Columbia, Canada. He finally won a gold medal at the 1998 Games and competed in the high jump for the fifth successive Games in 2002.

He was later inducted into the London Youth Games Hall of Fame in 2011.

He was a board director of the London 2012 Olympic bid team and he was also a captain of the Great Britain & NI team. Grant was appointed president of the South of England Athletics Association for 2010–2011. Dalton has set up the Dalton Grant Academy in Trinidad and Tobago. He is also a patron of Mossbourne Academy.

== Achievements ==
| Year | Competition | Venue | Position | Event | Notes |
Representing Great Britain and England
| 1985 | European Junior Championships | Cottbus, East Germany | 6th | High jump | 2.18 m |
| 1986 | Commonwealth Games | Edinburgh, United Kingdom | 7th | High jump | 2.10 m |
| 1987 | European Indoor Championships | Liévin, France | 7th | High jump | 2.27 m |
| 1987 | World Indoor Championships | Indianapolis, United States | 8th | High jump | 2.28 m |
| 1988 | European Indoor Championships | Budapest, Hungary | 11th | High jump | 2.24 m |
| 1988 | Olympic Games | Seoul, South Korea | 7th | High jump | 2.31 m |
| 1989 | European Indoor Championships | The Hague, Netherlands | 2nd | High jump | 2.33 m |
| 1989 | World Indoor Championships | Budapest, Hungary | 4th | High jump | 2.35 m |
| 1989 | World Cup | Barcelona, Spain | 2nd | High jump | 2.31 m |
| 1990 | Commonwealth Games | Auckland, New Zealand | 2nd | High jump | 2.34 m |
| 1990 | European Indoor Championships | Glasgow, United Kingdom | 7th | High jump | 2.24 m |
| 1990 | European Championships | Split, Yugoslavia | 4th | High jump | 2.31 m |
| 1991 | World Championships | Tokyo, Japan | 4th | High jump | 2.36 m |
| 1992 | Olympic Games | Barcelona, Spain | 29th (q) | High jump | 2.15 m |
| 1993 | World Indoor Championships | Toronto, Canada | 4th | High jump | 2.34 m |
| 1993 | World Championships | Stuttgart, Germany | 14th (q) | High jump | 2.25 m |
| 1994 | European Indoor Championships | Paris, France | 1st | High jump | 2.37 m |
| 1994 | European Championships | Helsinki, Finland | 9th | High jump | 2.25 m |
| 1994 | Commonwealth Games | Victoria, Canada | 5th | High jump | 2.28 m |
| 1995 | World Indoor Championships | Barcelona, Spain | 8th | High jump | 2.28 m |
| 1995 | World Championships | Gothenburg, Sweden | 14th (q) | High jump | 2.27 m |
| 1996 | European Indoor Championships | Stockholm, Sweden | 19th (q) | High jump | 2.15 m |
| 1996 | Olympic Games | Atlanta, United States | 19th (q) | High jump | 2.26 m |
| 1997 | World Indoor Championships | Paris, France | 10th | High jump | 2.25 m |
| 1997 | World Championships | Athens, Greece | 4th | High jump | 2.32 m |
| 1998 | European Championships | Budapest, Hungary | 2nd | High jump | 2.34 m |
| 1998 | Commonwealth Games | Kuala Lumpur, Malaysia | 1st | High jump | 2.31 m |
| 2002 | Commonwealth Games | Manchester, United Kingdom | 6th | High jump | 2.15 m |
| 2002 | European Championships | Munich, Germany | – | High jump | NM |
| 2003 | World Indoor Championships | Birmingham, United Kingdom | 12th (q) | High jump | 2.20 m |
