= Tyke Peacock =

American high jumper (born 1961)

Personal information
- Born: February 24, 1961 (age 65)
Medal record
Men's athletics
Representing the United States
World Championships
Silver medal – second place	1983 Helsinki	High jump

Tyke Peacock (born February 24, 1961) is a retired high jumper from the United States, who is best known for winning the silver medal in the men's high jump event at the inaugural 1983 World Championships. He set his personal best of 2.33 metres in the same event on 1983-08-17 at a meet in Berlin.

He also won the 1981 IAAF World Cup.
