= Wong Yew Tong =

Singaporean athlete

Personal information
- Nationality: Singaporean
- Born: 16 June 1971 (age 55)

Sport
- Sport: Athletics
- Event: High jump

Wong Yew Tong (born 16 June 1971) is a Singaporean athlete. He competed in the men's high jump at the 1996 Summer Olympics.

== Career ==
Wong Yew Tong broke the national record for men's high jump in 1995 Southeast Asian Games with a height of 2.22 metres, which stood for 30 years.
