= Oleg Zhukovskiy =

Belarusian high jumper

Oleg Zhukovskiy (Belarusian: Алег Жукоўскі; born 15 February 1970) is a retired Belarusian high jumper.

He finished tenth at the 1993 World Championships, twelfth at the 1994 European Indoor Championships, and fourteenth at the 1994 European Championships. He competed at the 1995 World Championships without reaching the final.

Zhukovskiy became Belarusian high jump champion in 1993. Rivals around this time include Vladimir Zaboronyok, Nikolay Moskalev and Aleksandr Buglakov. He also became the last Soviet indoor champion, in 1992.

His personal best was 2.31 metres, achieved in May 1993 in Gomel. On the indoor track he had 2.33 metres, achieved in February 1995 in Banská Bystrica.
