= Hossein Shayan =

Iranian high jumper

Personal information
- Nationality: Iranian
- Born: 30 March 1971 (age 54)

Sport
- Sport: Athletics
- Event: High jump

Hossein Shayan (Persian: حسین شایان, born 30 March 1971) is an Iranian athlete. He competed in the men's high jump at the 1992 Summer Olympics.
