= Ian Thompson (high jumper) =

Bahamian high jumper

Personal information
- Born: 8 December 1968
- Died: 15 March 1999 (aged 30)

Sport
- Sport: Track and field
Medal record
Representing Bahamas
CAC Junior Championships (U20)
Gold medal – first place	1988 Nassau	High jump
CARIFTA Games Junior (U20)
Gold medal – first place	1988 Kingston	High Jump
Silver medal – second place	1987 Port of Spain	High Jump

Ian Ronald Thompson (8 December 1968 – 15 March 1999) was a Bahamian high jumper.

== Career ==
He finished eleventh at the 1995 World Championships. He won the Central American and Caribbean Junior Championships in 1988.

He died in March 1999 and the Bahamian 4x100 metre women's relay team dedicated their gold medal in the 1999 World Championships to him.

== Achievements ==
Year	Competition	Venue	Position	Notes
Representing the Bahamas
1987	CARIFTA Games (U-20)	Port of Spain, Trinidad and Tobago	2nd	2.09 m
1988	CARIFTA Games (U-20)	Kingston, Jamaica	1st	2.11 m
1988	Central American and Caribbean Junior Championships (U-20)	Nassau, Bahamas	1st	2.05 m
1993	Universiade	Buffalo, United States	8th	2.21 m
1994	Commonwealth Games	Victoria, Canada	9th	2.25 m
1995	World Championships	Gothenburg, Sweden	11th	2.25 m
1996	Olympic Games	Atlanta, United States	10th (q)	2.26 m
1997	World Indoor Championships	Paris, France	18th (q)	2.20 m
