= Ettore Ceresoli =

Italian high jumper

Personal information
- Nationality: Italian
- Born: April 11, 1970 (age 56) Romano di Lombardia, Italy

Sport
- Country: Italy
- Sport: Athletics
- Event: High jump

Achievements and titles
- Personal best: High jump: 2.28 m (1995)
Medal record
Event	1st	2nd	3rd
Military World Games	1	0	0

Ettore Ceresoli (born 11 April 1970) is a retired Italian high jumper.

== Biography ==
He finished eighth at the 1995 World Indoor Championships and tenth at the 1998 European Indoor Championships. He also competed at the 1994 European Indoor Championships without reaching the final. He became Italian high jump champion in 1993 and 1995, rivalling with Roberto Ferrari. He also became indoor champion in 1995 and 1998.

His personal best jump is 2.26 metres, achieved in September 1995 in Rome. He had 2.28 metres on the indoor track, achieved at the 1995 World Indoor Championships in Barcelona, he has 11 caps in national team from 1992 to 1998.

== Achievements ==
Year	Competition	Venue	Position	Event	Performance	Notes
1995	World Indoor Championships	(Spain) Barcelona	8th	High jump	2.28 m	

== National titles ==
Ettore Ceresoli has won 3 times the individual national championship.

- 2 wins in High jump (1993, 1995)
- 2 wins in High jump indoor (1995, 1998)

== See also ==
- High jump winners of Italian Athletics Championships
