= Lunavi =

American data center and managed services provider

- Formerly: Green House Data
- Type: Private
- Industry: Colocation, Cloud Hosting, Managed Hosting
- Founded: 2007
- Headquarters: 340 Progress Circle; Cheyenne, Wyoming 82007
- Key people: Shawn Mills, Thomas Burns, Cortney Thompson, Co-Founders; Sam Galeotos, board member
- ASNs: 6295, 7336, 16518, 33561, 46691, 54431
- Website: www.lunavi.com

Lunavi, formerly Green House Data, is a data center and managed services provider headquartered in Cheyenne, Wyoming, United States.

Cheyenne is home to a campus with 45,000 square feet of data center space, and administrative and technical support offices. The company has additional data center locations in Washington,and Georgia, with sales and marketing offices in Laramie a. As of 2019, the company also operates an IT consulting focused office in Toronto, Ontario.. Lunavi is an Azure Expert MSP and holds several designations and specializations from Microsoft, including Data & AI, Digital & App Innovation, Infrastructure and Security.

== History ==
Green House Data was founded in 2007 as a colocation and cloud hosting provider. The company was co-founded by Shawn Mills and Cortney Thompson.

In April 2015, the company acquired FiberCloud, a Seattle, Washington-based provider of colocation, cloud hosting, and other data center services. With this acquisition, Green House Data added three data centers in Washington state, along with nearly 20 employees and several hundred customers.

In April 2017, the company acquired Cirracore, a cloud-focused infrastructure provider based in Atlanta, Georgia. In November 2017, the company acquired Ajubeo, a cloud hosting service provider based in Denver.

In May 2018, Green House Data announced a merger via acquisition of Infront Consulting Group. In 2020, Green House Data rebranded itself as Lunavi.

In 2025, Lunavi launched an AI digital test to detect early Alzheimer's. Lunavi created the digital tool along with i-Function, a Florida-based digital tool developing company. The test takes fifteen minutes and is then analyzed by clinicians.

== Sustainable energy ==
In 2013, Green House Data was part the of EPA's "Leadership Club" for sustainable power purchases.

Beginning in 2014, Green House Data was the first company to participate in WyoRECs, the first renewable energy credit program based in Wyoming.

In April 2015, Green House Data joined the EPA's Top 30 Tech & Telecom list of the largest green power users, retiring over 8 million kilowatt-hours (kWh) of green power annually. By 2017, the company moved up 5 places on the list, retiring 20,270,000 kWhs.

== Data Centers ==
Lunavi operates three data center facilities across three geographic regions. There are cloud and colocation data centers in Atlanta, GA; Cheyenne, WY; and Bellingham, WA. In March 2016, the company announced a "Hear from a Human" technical support service guarantee.
