= Artur Partyka =

Polish high jumper (born 1969)

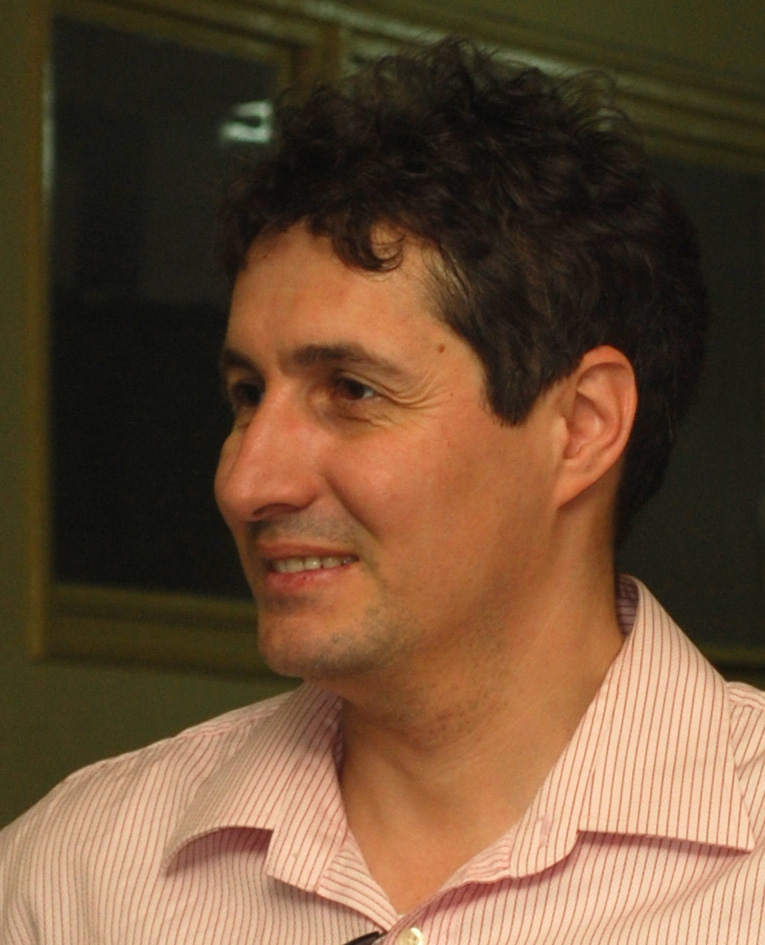
- Partyka in 2009

Personal information
- Born: 25 July 1969 (age 57) Stalowa Wola, Poland

Sport
- Sport: Track and field
Medal record
Representing Poland
Event	1st	2nd	3rd
Olympic Games	0	1	1
World Championships	0	2	1
World Indoor Championships	0	1	0
European Championships	1	1	0
European Indoor Championships	2	0	0
Continental Cup	0	0	0
Total	3	5	2
Olympic Games
Silver medal – second place	1996 Atlanta	High jump
Bronze medal – third place	1992 Barcelona	High jump
World Championships
Silver medal – second place	1993 Stuttgart	High jump
Silver medal – second place	1997 Athens	High jump
Bronze medal – third place	1995 Gothenburg	High jump
World Indoor Championships
Silver medal – second place	1991 Seville	High jump
European Championships
Gold medal – first place	1998 Budapest	High jump
Silver medal – second place	1994 Helsinki	High jump
European Indoor Championships
Gold medal – first place	1990 Glasgow	High jump
Gold medal – first place	1998 Valencia	High jump
World Junior Championships
Gold medal – first place	1988 Sudbury	High jump
European Junior Championships
Gold medal – first place	1987 Birmingham	High jump

Artur Jerzy Partyka (born 25 July 1969) is a former Polish high jumper and two-time Olympic medalist. He won twelve national titles in a row, starting in 1989. He represented ŁKS Łódź.

His father is Algerian, his mother is Polish. He was one of the leading high jumpers of the 1990s. Partyka is one of only 21 competitors to clear the height of 2.38 metres or more. With that height he set the Polish record in high jump.

He won the bronze medal at the 1992 Summer Olympics in Barcelona and the silver medal at the 1996 Summer Olympics in Atlanta. He was also a three-time medalist at the outdoor World Championships: a two-time silver medalist (1993 and 1997) and a one-time bronze medalist (1995). He was also a silver medalist at the indoor World Championships in 1991. He also won two medals at the outdoor European Championships: silver in 1994 and gold in 1998. He won the gold medal at the indoor European Championships in 1998.

For his sport achievements, he received the Golden Cross of Merit in 1996.

Partyka has been the director of the indoor Pedros Cup in 2007, 2008, and 2009; a meet that takes place in Bydgoszcz. The competition was limited only to high jumpers and pole vaulters, but as of 2009, world-class field shot put was added.

== Competition record ==
Year	Competition	Venue	Position	Notes
Representing Poland
1986	World Junior Championships	Athens, Greece	13th (q)	2.11 m
1987	European Junior Championships	Birmingham, United Kingdom	1st	2.19 m
1988	World Junior Championships	Sudbury, Canada	1st	2.28 m
1988	Olympic Games	Seoul, South Korea	20th (q)	2.19 m
1989	European Indoor Championships	The Hague, Netherlands	10th	2.20 m
1989	Universiade	Duisburg, West Germany	5th	2.25 m
1990	European Indoor Championships	Glasgow, United Kingdom	1st	2.33 m
1990	European Championships	Split, Yugoslavia	11th	2.24 m
1991	World Indoor Championships	Seville, Spain	2nd	2.37 m
1991	World Championships	Tokyo, Japan	12th	2.24 m
1992	Olympic Games	Barcelona, Spain	3rd	2.34 m
1993	World Championships	Stuttgart, Germany	2nd	2.37 m
1994	European Championships	Helsinki, Finland	2nd	2.33 m
1995	World Championships	Gothenburg, Sweden	3rd	2.35 m
1996	Olympic Games	Atlanta, United States	2nd	2.37 m
1997	World Championships	Athens, Greece	2nd	2.35 m
1998	European Indoor Championships	Valencia, Spain	1st	2.31 m
1998	European Championships	Budapest, Hungary	1st	2.34 m

== See also ==
- Polish records in athletics
