= Lochsley Thomson =

Australian high jumper

Lochsley Thomson (born 20 August 1973) is a retired Australian high jumper.

He finished fifth at the 1994 Commonwealth Games. He also competed at the 1992 Olympic Games without reaching the final.

His personal best jump is 2.31 metres (7.6 ft), achieved in March 1992 in Adelaide.
