= Mark Mandy =

Irish high jumper

Personal information
- Nationality: Irish
- Born: 19 November 1972 (age 53) Stafford, England
- Height: 197 cm (6 ft 6 in)
- Weight: 83 kg (183 lb)

Sport
- Sport: Athletics
- Event: High jump
- Club: Cannock & Stafford AC

Mark Mandy (born 19 November 1972) is a retired high jumper who was born in England and competed for the Republic of Ireland by virtue of the fact he had a grandfather from Dublin. He competed at the 1996 Summer Olympics.

== Biography ==
He competed at the World Championships in 1993, 1995 and 1997, the 1996 Olympic Games, the 1997 World Indoor Championships, the 1994, 1996 and 1998 European Indoor Championships and the 1994 European Championships without reaching the final.

Domestically, Mandy became Irish champion five times as well as AAA champion in 1997, AAA indoor champion in 1997, and Scottish champion in 1995.

His personal best jump is 2.25 metres, achieved in July 1995 in Gateshead. He achieved +2.26 metres on the indoor track, achieved in February 1997 in Birmingham. His best was the Irish record for a while before Brendan Reilly switched his allegiance from the United Kingdom to the Republic of Ireland and broke the record; this has since been broken. The current Irish record of 2.30 metres is held by Adrian O'Dwyer set in Algiers on 24 June 2004.
