= Juha Isolehto =

Finnish high jumper

Juha Isolehto (born 6 June 1968) is a retired Finnish high jumper.

He finished tenth at the 1990 European Championships. He also competed at the World Championships in 1991, 1993 and 1995 without reaching the final. He became Finnish champion in 1991, 1992, 1993, 1994, 1995 and 1997.

His personal best jump was 2.30 metres, achieved in June 1995 in Turku.
