= Dragutin Topić =

Serbian high jumper

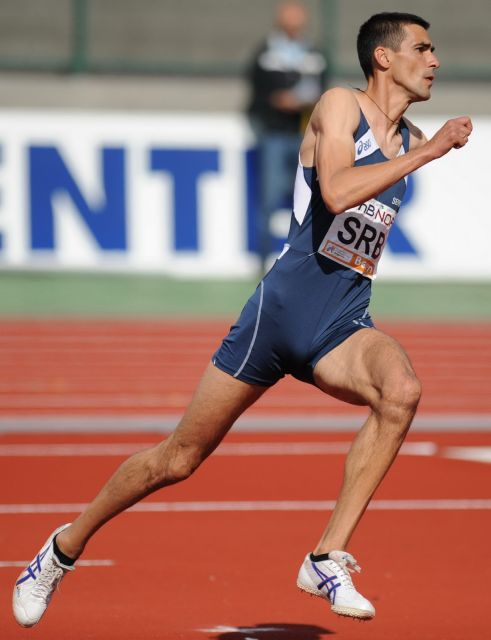
- Topić in 2009

Personal information
- Nationality: Serbian
- Born: 12 March 1971 (age 55) Belgrade, SR Serbia, SFR Yugoslavia
- Height: 1.95 m (6 ft 5 in)
- Weight: 73 kg (161 lb; 11.5 st)

Sport
- Sport: Track and field
- Event: High jump
- Club: AK Crvena zvezda, AK Partizan

Achievements and titles
- Personal bests: Outdoor: 2.38 m Indoor: 2.35 m
Medal record
Representing (Socialist Federal Republic of Yugoslavia) / (Federal Republic of Yugoslavia) Yugoslavia and Serbia
World Indoor Championships
Bronze medal – third place	1997 Paris	High jump
European Championships
Gold medal – first place	1990 Split	High jump
European Indoor Championships
Gold medal – first place	1996 Stockholm	High jump
Bronze medal – third place	1992 Genoa	High jump
Bronze medal – third place	2000 Ghent	High jump
Mediterranean Games
Bronze medal – third place	2009 Pescara	High jump
World Junior Championships
Gold medal – first place	1990 Plovdiv	High jump
Universiade
Gold medal – first place	1995 Fukuoka	High jump

Dragutin Topić (Serbian Cyrillic: Драгутин Топић, born 12 March 1971) is a retired Serbian high jumper, former European champion and world junior record holder.

== Biography ==
Topić is a world junior record holder with 2.37 m, which he set while winning the 1990 World Junior Championships, three weeks before his win at the senior European Championships. In the same year, Topić received the Golden Badge award for best athlete of Yugoslavia. Topić set five national records and claimed four Yugoslav national championships in the men's high jump event. He is a former member of AK Crvena zvezda, where he spent the majority of his career.

Topić competed until 2012, and had one of the longest careers in high-level high jump, since he holds not only world junior record with 2.37 m, but also world masters record for the ages over 35 (2.31 m, set in 2009), and over 40 years of age (2.28 m, set in 2012).

He competed at eight World Championships, and at six Olympic Games (between 1992 and 2012), which is an Olympic record for high jump, and he also shared the record for most appearances at the Olympics by a male track and field athlete with distance runner João N'Tyamba and race walker Jesús Ángel García, who later broke the record. In 2024 he received Coaching award at the Golden Tracks awards organized by the European Athletic Association (EAA).

== Personal bests ==
Event	Performance	Date	Location
High jump (outdoor)	2.38 m	1 August 1993	Belgrade
High jump (indoor)	2.35 m	10 March 1996	Stockholm

== International competitions ==
Year	Competition	Venue	Position	Notes
Representing SFR Yugoslavia
1989	European Junior Championships	Varaždin, Yugoslavia	4th	2.20 m
1990	World Junior Championships	Plovdiv, Bulgaria	1st	2.37 m
1990	European Championships	Split, Yugoslavia	1st	2.34 m
1991	World Indoor Championships	Seville, Spain	11th	2.24 m
1991	World Championships	Tokyo, Japan	9th	2.28 m
1992	European Indoor Championships	Genoa, Italy	3rd	2.29 m
Representing (International Olympic Committee) Independent Olympic Participants
1992	Olympic Games	Barcelona, Spain	8th	2.28 m
Representing FR Yugoslavia
1993	Universiade	Buffalo, United States	8th	2.21 m
1993	World Championships	Stuttgart, Germany	26th (q)	2.20 m
1994	European Championships	Helsinki, Finland	5th	2.31 m
1994	Grand Prix Final	Paris, France	3rd	2.30 m
1995	Universiade	Fukuoka, Japan	1st	2.29 m
1995	World Championships	Gothenburg, Sweden	8th	2.25 m
1996	European Indoor Championships	Stockholm, Sweden	1st	2.35 m
1996	Olympic Games	Atlanta, United States	4th	2.32 m
1997	World Indoor Championships	Paris, France	3rd	2.32 m
1997	World Championships	Athens, Greece	22nd (q)	2.23 m
1998	European Indoor Championships	Valencia, Spain	6th	2.22 m
1998	European Championships	Budapest, Hungary	9th	2.24 m
1999	World Championships	Seville, Spain	4th	2.32 m
2000	European Indoor Championships	Ghent, Belgium	3rd	2.34 m
2000	Olympic Games	Sydney, Australia	21st (q)	2.20 m
2000	Grand Prix Final	Doha, Qatar	3rd	2.25 m
Representing Serbia and Montenegro
2003	World Indoor Championships	Birmingham, United Kingdom	4th	2.30 m
2004	Olympic Games	Athens, Greece	10th	2.29 m
2005	European Indoor Championships	Madrid, Spain	5th	2.30 m
2005	World Championships	Helsinki, Finland	9th	2.25 m
Representing Serbia
2007	World Championships	Osaka, Japan	31st (q)	2.19 m
2008	European Cup — 2nd League	Banská Bystrica, Slovakia	1st	2.24 m
2008	World Indoor Championships	Valencia, Spain	6th	2.27 m
2008	Olympic Games	Beijing, China	17th (q)	2.25 m
2009	European Indoor Championships	Turin, Italy	8th	2.25 m
2009	European Team Championships — 1st League	Bergen, Norway	1st	2.29 m
2009	Mediterranean Games	Pescara, Italy	3rd	2.26 m
2009	World Championships	Berlin, Germany	30th (q)	2.15 m
2012	European Championships	Helsinki, Finland	30th (q)	2.10 m
2012	Olympic Games	London, United Kingdom	—	NM

Notes:
- (q) Indicates overall position in the qualifying round.
- At the 2012 Olympic Games, Topić had three failures at the opening height of 2.16 m in the qualifying round.

== Doping ==
On 2 February 2001, after a meeting in Wuppertal, Germany, he was tested and his urine sample showed the presence of norandrosterone in concentrations slightly higher than allowed. He was tested positive to norandrosterone and suspended for two years.

== Personal life ==
His wife is Serbian former track and field athlete and national record holder in triple jump, Biljana Topić (née Mitrović), and he served as her coach while he was still an active competitor. Their daughter, Angelina Topić, won the high jump event at the 2022 European U18 Championships and also holds the national record in high jump, as well as equal world U18 best. During the 1990s, Topić was a member of the Yugoslav Left (JUL) political party.

== See also ==
- Serbian records in athletics
- List of junior world records in athletics
- List of world records in masters athletics
- List of doping cases in athletics

Awards
Preceded by Dragomir Bečanović	The Best Athlete of Yugoslavia; 1990	Succeeded by Dejan Savićević
