= Leonid Pumalainen =

Russian high jumper

Leonid Vladimirovich Pumalainen (Russian: Леонид Владимирович Пумалайнен; born 13 April 1970) is a retired Russian high jumper.

== Career ==
He finished fifth at the 1994 European Indoor Championships, seventh at the 1994 European Championships, and won a bronze medal at the 1994 Goodwill Games behind Javier Sotomayor and Hollis Conway. In 1996 he won the silver medal at the European Indoor Championships in Stockholm with a jump of 2.33 metres.

Pumalainen became Russian high jump champion in 1994. Rivals around this time include Aleksey Yemelin, Grigoriy Fedorkov and Aleksey Denisov. He also became indoor champion in 1996.

His personal best outdoors was 2.30 metres, achieved in July 1995 in Eberstadt. Indoors, his 2.33 metres was a personal best.
