= Tony Barton (athlete) =

American high jumper

Personal information
- Born: October 17, 1969 (age 56) Washington, D.C., U.S.
- Children: Marley and Jaden Barton
Medal record
Men's Athletics
Representing the United States
World Indoor Championships
Bronze medal – third place	1995 Barcelona	High jump
Universiade
Gold medal – first place	1993 Buffalo	High Jump

Orrin Anthony Barton (born October 17, 1969) is an American retired high jumper.

Barton was born in Washington, D.C. He finished fifth at the 1992 World Cup, won the 1993 Summer Universiade, finished eighth at the 1993 World Championships, won the bronze medal at the 1995 World Indoor Championships and seventh at the 1995 World Championships. At one time he was the third-ranked high jumper in the world and number one in the United States.

Bartin competed for the Virginia State Trojans track and field and the George Mason Patriots track and field teams in the NCAA.

His personal best jump is 2.32 metres, achieved in June 1992 in New Orleans. He also had 8.16 metres in the long jump.
