= 1993 World Championships in Athletics – Men's high jump =

These are the official results of the Men's High Jump event at the 1993 IAAF World Championships in Stuttgart, Germany. There were a total of 40 participating athletes, with two qualifying groups and the final held on Sunday August 22, 1993. The qualification mark was set at 2.29 metres.

== Schedule ==
- All times are Central European Time (UTC+1)

Qualification Round
Group A	Group B
20.08.1993 – 17:45h	20.08.1993 – 17:45h
Final Round
22.08.1993 – 15:00h

== Abbreviations ==
- All results shown are in metres

Q	automatic qualification
q	qualification by rank
DNS	did not start
NM	no mark
WR	world record
AR	area record
NR	national record
PB	personal best
SB	season best

== Final ==
Rank	Name	Nationality	2.10	2.15	2.20	2.25	2.28	2.31	2.34	2.37	2.40	2.46	Result	Notes
1st place, gold medalist(s)	Javier Sotomayor	Cuba	–	–	–	o	–	–	o	o	xo	xxr	2.40	CR
2nd place, silver medalist(s)	Artur Partyka	Poland	–	o	–	xo	–	o	x–	o	xxx		2.37	NR
3rd place, bronze medalist(s)	Steve Smith	Great Britain	–	–	–	o	–	xxo	xo	o	xxx		2.37	=NR
4	Ralf Sonn	Germany	–	–	o	–	o	o	o	x–	xx		2.34	PB
5	Troy Kemp	Bahamas	–	–	–	o	–	xo	o	xxx			2.34	
6	Hollis Conway	United States	–	–	–	xo	–	xo	xo	x–	xx		2.34	
7	Arturo Ortiz	Spain	–	–	o	–	o	xo	xx–	x			2.31	
8	Tony Barton	United States	–	–	–	o	o	xxo	xxx				2.31	
9	Tim Forsyth	Australia	–	–	o	–	o	xxx					2.28	
10	Oleg Zhukovskiy	Belarus	–	o	o	o	xo	xxx					2.28	
11	Jean-Charles Gicquel	France											2.25	
11	Róbert Ruffíni	Slovakia											2.25	

== Qualifying round ==
- Held on Friday 1993-08-20

Qualification rule: 2.31 (Q) or the 12 best results (q) qualified for the final.

Rank	Group	Name	Nationality	1.90	2.00	2.05	2.10	2.15	2.20	2.25	2.28	Result	Notes
1	A	Ralf Sonn	Germany									2.28	q
2	A	Artur Partyka	Poland									2.28	q
3	A	Hollis Conway	United States									2.28	q
4	A	Arturo Ortiz	Spain									2.25	q
4	A	Jean-Charles Gicquel	France									2.25	q
6	A	Juha Isolehto	Finland									2.25	
7	A	Aleksey Yemelin	Russia									2.25	
7	A	Dalton Grant	Great Britain	–	–	–	–	–	o	xo	xxx	2.25	
7	A	Steinar Hoen	Norway									2.25	
10	A	Roberto Ferrari	Italy									2.25	
11	A	Brendan Reilly	Great Britain									2.20	
11	A	Lee Jin-Taek	South Korea									2.20	
13	A	Marino Drake	Cuba									2.20	
14	A	Dragutin Topić	Individual World Championship Participants									2.20	
15	A	Robert Marinov	Bulgaria									2.15	
16	A	Mark Mandy	Ireland									2.10	
16	A	Satoru Nonaka	Japan									2.10	
18	A	Fakhraldien Gor	Jordan									2.05	
18	A	Karl Scatliffe	British Virgin Islands									2.05	
	A	Lambros Papakostas	Greece									DNS	
1	B	Tony Barton	United States									2.28	q
1	B	Tim Forsyth	Australia									2.28	q
1	B	Javier Sotomayor	Cuba									2.28	q
1	B	Steve Smith	Great Britain	–	–	–	–	–	o	o	o	2.28	q
5	B	Oleg Zhukovskiy	Belarus									2.28	q
6	B	Troy Kemp	Bahamas									2.28	q
7	B	Róbert Ruffíni	Slovakia									2.28	q
8	B	Wolf-Hendrik Beyer	Germany									2.25	
9	B	Takahisa Yoshida	Japan									2.25	
10	B	Alex Zaliauskas	Canada									2.20	
11	B	Rick Noji	United States									2.20	
12	B	Xavier Robilliard	France									2.20	
13	B	Itai Margalit	Israel									2.20	
13	B	Georgi Dakov	Bulgaria									2.20	
13	B	Gustavo Adolfo Becker	Spain									2.20	
16	B	Igor Paklin	Kyrgyzstan									2.15	
16	B	Othmane Belfaa	Algeria									2.15	
18	B	Hugo Muñoz	Peru									2.10	
19	B	Antonio Pazzaglia	San Marino									2.05	
	B	Patrik Sjöberg	Sweden									DNS	

=== Final ===
Rank	Name	Nationality	2.10	2.15	2.20	2.25	2.28	2.31	2.34	2.37	2.40	2.46	Result	Notes
1st place, gold medalist(s)	Javier Sotomayor	Cuba	–	–	–	o	–	–	o	o	xo	xxr	2.40	CR
2nd place, silver medalist(s)	Artur Partyka	Poland	–	o	–	xo	–	o	x–	o	xxx		2.37	NR
3rd place, bronze medalist(s)	Steve Smith	Great Britain	–	–	–	o	–	xxo	xo	o	xxx		2.37	=NR
4	Ralf Sonn	Germany	–	–	o	–	o	o	o	x–	xx		2.34	PB
5	Troy Kemp	Bahamas	–	–	–	o	–	xo	o	xxx			2.34	
6	Hollis Conway	United States	–	–	–	xo	–	xo	xo	x–	xx		2.34	
7	Arturo Ortiz	Spain	–	–	o	–	o	xo	xx–	x			2.31	
8	Tony Barton	United States	–	–	–	o	o	xxo	xxx				2.31	
9	Tim Forsyth	Australia	–	–	o	–	o	xxx					2.28	
10	Oleg Zhukovskiy	Belarus	–	o	o	o	xo	xxx					2.28	
11	Jean-Charles Gicquel	France											2.25	
11	Róbert Ruffíni	Slovakia											2.25	

== See also ==
- 1990 Men's European Championships High Jump
- 1992 Men's Olympic High Jump
- 1994 Men's European Championships High Jump
