= Anton Riepl =

German high jumper

Anton "Toni" Riepl (born 28 February 1969) is a retired German high jumper.

He finished twelfth at the 1995 World Indoor Championships. He represented the sports club LAC Quelle Fürth. At the German championships he won the bronze medal in 1997 behind Martin Buss and Christian Rhoden. At the German indoor championships he won the silver medal in 1995 behind Ralf Sonn, and bronze medals in 1996 and 1998.

His personal best jump outdoors was 2.26 metres, achieved in May 1993 in Vilsbiburg. However, indoors he had 2.33 metres in February 1995 in Siegen. Riepl stood 1.75 m (5 ft 8 3/4 in) tall, and thus jumped 0.58 m (1 ft 10 3/4 in) higher than himself. This height difference is the third largest in men's high jump ever, tied with two jumpers, and only beaten by Stefan Holm and Franklin Jacobs.
