= Alex Zaliauskas =

Canadian retired high jumper (born 1971)

Personal information
- Born: 20 April 1971 (age 55) Toronto, Canada

Sport
- Sport: Track and field

Alex Zaliauskas (born 20 April 1971) is a Canadian retired high jumper.

Zaliauskas competed at the 1991 World Championships, the 1992 Olympic Games, the 1993 World Indoor Championships and the 1993 World Championships without reaching the final.

Zaliauskas's personal best jump is 2.31 metres, achieved in July 1991 in New York. Zaliauskas's talents also shone as a student athlete, where he continued to dominate winning 5 CIAU titles while still holding both OUA and U Sports records.
