= Charles Austin (high jumper) =

American high jumper (born 1967)

Personal information
- Full name: Charles Allen Austin
- Born: December 19, 1967 (age 58) Bay City, Texas, U.S.
- Height: 6 ft 0 in (183 cm)
- Weight: 170 lb (77 kg)
Medal record
Men's athletics
Representing the United States
Olympic Games
Gold medal – first place	1996 Atlanta	High jump
World Championships
Gold medal – first place	1991 Tokyo	High jump
World Indoor Championships
Gold medal – first place	1997 Paris	High jump
Bronze medal – third place	1999 Maebashi	High jump
World Cup Championship
Gold medal – first place	1998 Johannesburg	High jump

Charles Allen Austin (born December 19, 1967) is an American former athlete who won the gold medal in the men's high jump at the 1996 Summer Olympics in Atlanta. He was inducted into the United States Track & Field Hall of Fame in 2012. Currently, Charles and Javier Sotomayor are the only two high jumpers that have won gold medals in the Olympics, Outdoor World Championships, Indoor World Championships and World Cup Championships. Hennadiy Avdyeyenko, who won the inaugural 1983 Outdoor World Championship setting the championship high jump record with a jump of 2.32m (7' 7 1/4"), and Charles are the only two high jumpers to win and establish the championship record in both the Outdoor World Championship and Olympic Games. He currently holds or previously held the high jump record at the three biggest outdoor (Olympics, Outdoor World Championship and Zurich, Weltklasse) track and field competitions.

== Career ==
Charles Austin coached himself over his 15-year professional career to where only seven people in the history of the high jump jumped higher. Standing 6' 1/2", he jumped 22 inches over his height, sixth all time. An Olympic gold medalist, Austin is the current American and Olympic high jump record holder, two-time World Champion, and a nine-time national track and field high jump champion. From starting in high school to the end of his career, Charles improved almost a foot in height.

Born in Bay City, Texas, and raised in Van Vleck, Texas, Austin was the youngest of 10 children. He was a senior in high school without any way to pay for college, when some friends convinced him to try high jumping for the track team. He cleared six feet on his first try to make the team and finished the year with a personal best of 6' 11".

Austin's success landed him an athletic scholarship at Southwest Texas University (now Texas State University). After a difficult first few years, he climbed the ranks in the NCAA, shattering school records and his senior year, won the NCAA Outdoor Championship in 1990 and was the number one college high jumper in the country.

In 1991, Austin graduated with a degree in business administration. Within the year, five years after taking up the high jump in 1986, he was the American Record Holder (2.40m – 7'10 1/2"), gold medalist at the 1991 World Championship and was a contender to win in the Olympics. However, when he arrived at the 1992 Olympic trials there was speculation on whether or not he should compete, due to a knee injury. He pushed forward, making it on to the U.S. team, but his confidence was shaken and a poor performance cost him a medal. He finished in eighth place.

The trouble continued, forcing Austin to have major surgery in July 1993 where almost half of his patellar tendon had to be removed due to the damage that was caused. Because of the severity of the injury, Austin was told his high jump career was over. He took it upon himself to rehabilitate his knee back to where he could once again compete at the highest level. He was left to watch from home as his fellow athletes competed in the 1993 World Championship. In 1994, he began his journey back to the top of the world high jump ranks. Within a few years, he had regained his strength and was once again performing at a high level.

When he returned to the Olympics in 1996, he did so with a new determination and mental focus. His gold winning jump of 7' 10" was a new Olympic record and still stands today. He was inducted into the United States Hall of Fame in 2012.

== After Athletics ==
Austin is the owner of So High Sports and Fitness (SoHighSports.com) a sports performance and personal training company. He opened his So High Sports and Fitness Studio in 2002 and his So High Sports and Fitness Performance Center in 2008. Both are located in San Marcos, Texas.

Charles is also the author of the book, Head Games: Life's Greatest Challenge. His self published book is also in the Library of Congress.

In 2014, Charles introduced his patented Total Body Board to the fitness equipment market.

Also, Charles set the Master's 45–50 age group World Record with a jump of 6 ft 8 3/4 in (2.051 m).

== Achievements ==
- 3-Time Olympian (1992, 1996, 2000)
- 1998 World Cup Champion
- 1997 Indoor World Championship High Jump Gold Medalist
- 1996 Olympic High Jump Gold Medalist
- 1991 Outdoor World Championship High Jump Gold Medalist
- 1990 NCAA Outdoor High Jump Champion
- 6-Time U. S. Outdoor Track & Field High Jump Champion (Consecutive)
- 3-Time U. S. Indoor Track & Field High Jump Champion
- Current American High Jump Record Holder 7' 10 1/2" (Set in 1991)
- Current Olympic High Jump Record Holder 7' 10" (Set in 1996)
- Competitions Over 2.30m (7' 6 1/2") – 61
- 1st Place (41), Second Place (13), Third Place (4), Fourth Place (1), Fifth Place (2)
- 2001 Outdoor World Track & Field Championship Team Captain
- 2001 Indoor World Track & Field Championship Team Captain
- 2000 Olympic Track & Field Men's Team Captain
- 1999 Outdoor World Track & Field Championship Team Captain
- 1999 Indoor World Track & Field Championship Team Captain
- 1998 World Cup Team Captain
- 1997 Outdoor World Track & Field Championship Team Captain
- 1997 Indoor World Track & Field Championship Flag Barrier
- Selected by the United States Olympic Committee to present President Clinton with the Presidential Olympic plaque at the White House (1996)
- Inducted into the United States Track & Field Hall of Fame, Class of 2012
- Inducted into the Texas Track and Field Coaches Association Hall of Fame, Class of 2017
- USATF Athlete of the Week, June 2014 in the M45 division

Sporting positions
Preceded by (Romania) Sorin Matei	Men's High Jump Best Year Performance alongside (United States) Hollis Conway (i), (Cuba) Javier Sotomayor; 1991	Succeeded by (Sweden) Patrik Sjöberg (i)
Preceded by (Cuba) Javier Sotomayor	Men's High Jump Best Year Performance; 1996	Succeeded by (Cuba) Javier Sotomayor
