= Steve Smith (British high jumper) =

English high jumper

Personal information
- Nationality: British (English)
- Born: 29 March 1973 (age 53) Liverpool, England
- Height: 185 cm (6 ft 1 in)
- Weight: 70 kg (154 lb)

Sport
- Sport: Track and field
- Event: High jump
- Club: Liverpool Harriers
Medal record
Men's athletics
Representing Great Britain
Olympic Games
Bronze medal – third place	1996 Atlanta	High jump
World Championships
Bronze medal – third place	1993 Stuttgart	High jump
World Indoor Championships
Bronze medal – third place	1993 Toronto	High jump
European Championships
Silver medal – second place	1994 Helsinki	High jump
World Junior Championships
Gold medal – first place	1992 Seoul	High jump
Representing England
Commonwealth Games
Silver medal – second place	1994 Victoria	High jump

James Stephenson Smith (born 29 March 1973) is a British retired high jumper, who competed at two Olympic Games. Smith's indoor mark of 2.38 metres and his outdoor mark of 2.37 metres are British records in the high jump (7 feet 9 and three-quarter inches, and 7 feet 9 and one-half inches, respectively).

== Biography ==
Smith was born in Liverpool, and trained there throughout his career under coach Mike Holmes. Standing 1.85 meters tall (6 ft. 1 inch), Smith is considered "small" in comparison to most world-class high jumpers. He jumps off his left leg. He first emerged as a talented jumper in 1990, when he cleared 2.25 (7 ft 4 inches) at a British national meet in Gateshead. In 1991, he improved to 2.29, and then had his "breakout" year in 1992, improving his best by an astonishing 8 centimetres. He qualified for the 1992 Olympics in Barcelona and reached the finals, finishing in 12th place with a disappointing height of only 2.24. One month after those Olympics, he competed at the 1992 World Junior Championships, where he won, and equalled the junior world record of 2.37 metres (outdoors), which Dragutin Topić had achieved in 1990. Smith equalled this result twice more (once indoors and once outdoors.) He established his personal best of 2.38, set indoors at Wuppertal, Germany, on 4 February 1994, which still stands as the British record.

He was a bronze medalist at the 1996 Olympics in Atlanta, the first British man to win a medal in the high jump since Con Leahy in 1908. He did it with just 5 jumps: eight men cleared 2.32, but only three (Smith, Poland's Artur Partyka and American Charles Austin) successfully jumped 2.35. With their medals secured, all 3 missed their initial attempts at 2.37, Partyka then cleared on his second attempt, and Smith and Austin passed for final attempts at 2.39 which only Charles Austin cleared (for a new Olympic record).

Smith was a five-time British high jump champion after winning the British AAA Championships title in 1992, 1995, 1996 and 1999 and by virtue of being the highest placed British athlete in 1993.

Smith retired after rupturing his Achilles tendon in 1999 (a year in which he was still jumping 2.36 outdoors). During his career, Smith leaped 2.36 (7 ft 9 inches) or better at nine different competitions. While his performance at the 1996 Olympics stands as the capstone, his best year was 1993 when he placed third at both the IAAF World Championships Indoors (Toronto, Ontario, Canada, on 14 March) and Outdoors (Stuttgart, Germany, on 22 August), jumping 2.37 at both meets.

Shortly after he retired from competition, he opened a restaurant in his hometown of Liverpool in 2000 and in 2004 founded Raise the Bar, a corporate training and apprenticeship business that works with global brands.

== Education ==
Smith was educated at the all-boys' De La Salle School in Liverpool.

== Achievements ==
Year	Competition	Venue	Position	Notes
Representing Great Britain and England
1990	World Junior Championships	Plovdiv, Bulgaria	15th (q)	2.10 m
1992	World Junior Championships	Seoul, South Korea	1st	2.37 m WJR
1993	World Indoor Championships	Toronto, Canada	3rd	2.37 m PB
1993	World Championships	Stuttgart, Germany	3rd	2.37 m =PB
1994	European Championships	Helsinki, Finland	2nd	2.33 m
1994	Commonwealth Games	Victoria, Canada	2nd	2.32 m
1995	World Championships	Gothenburg, Sweden	4th	2.35 m
1996	Olympic Games	Atlanta, United States	3rd	2.35 m
1997	World Indoor Championships	Paris, France	6th	2.25 m
