= Håkon Särnblom =

Norwegian high jumper

Håkon Särnblom (born 3 March 1966) is a retired Norwegian high jumper. He represented IK Tjalve and IF Minerva during his active career.

He finished tenth at the 1988 European Indoor Championships, fourteenth at the 1990 European Indoor Championships, sixth at the 1994 European Indoor Championships, fourth at the 1994 European Championships and tenth at the 1995 IAAF World Indoor Championships. He competed at the 1992 Summer Olympics as well as the World Championships in 1991 and 1995 without reaching the finals. He became Norwegian champion in the years 1986, 1988-1990 and 1992. Särnblom made a brief comeback at the 2006 Norwegian championships, representing Haugesund IL, but failed to clear his opening height at the competition.

His personal best jump was 2.31 metres, achieved in August 1994 in Helsinki. This makes him the second best high jumper in Norwegian history after Steinar Hoen.

Särnblom has also played basketball in the highest Norwegian league. He is married to fellow former high jumper Hanne Haugland.
