= 1983 CARIFTA Games =

XII CARIFTA Games
- Dates: April 2–4
- Host city: Fort-de-France, Martinique
- Level: Junior and Youth
- Events: 52
- Participation: more than 108 athletes from at least 13 nations

The 12th CARIFTA Games was held in Fort-de-France, Martinique on April 2–4, 1983.

== Participation (unofficial) ==
For the 1983 CARIFTA Games only the medalists can be found on the "World Junior Athletics History" website. An unofficial count yields the number of about 108 medalists (63 junior (under-20) and 45 youth (under-17)) from about 13 countries: Antigua and Barbuda (3), Bahamas (26), Barbados (9), Bermuda (5), Cayman Islands (1), Grenada (4), Guadeloupe (10), Jamaica (25), Martinique (11), Saint Kitts and Nevis (1), Saint Vincent and the Grenadines (2), Trinidad and Tobago (10), US Virgin Islands (1).

== Austin Sealy Award ==
The Austin Sealy Trophy for the most outstanding athlete of the games was awarded for the second time in the role to Laverne Eve from the Bahamas. As in 1982, she won 3 gold medals (shot put, discus throw, and javelin throw) in the junior (U-20) category.

== Medal summary ==
Medal winners are published by category: Boys under 20 (Junior), Girls under 20 (Junior), Boys under 17 (Youth), and Girls under 17 (Youth). The medalists can also be found on the "World Junior Athletics History" website.

=== Boys under 20 (Junior) ===
| Event | Gold | | Silver | | Bronze | |
|---|---|---|---|---|---|---|
| 100 metres (2.8 m/s) | Max Morinière (MTQ) | 10.36w | Ray Stewart (JAM) | 10.40w | Richemont Faro (GLP) | 10.64w |
| 200 metres | Ray Stewart (JAM) | 21.13 | Joey Wells (BAH) | 21.27 | Steve Morgan (JAM) | 21.31 |
| 400 metres | Carlyle Bernard (TRI) | 47.66 | Richard Louis (BAR) | 47.73 | John Bernard (TRI) | 49.54 |
| 800 metres | Dennis Hines (JAM) | 1:54.89 | Dale Jones (ATG) | 1:55.74 | Everett Simpson (JAM) | 1:55.78 |
| 1500 metres | Kevin Pearson (BER) | 3:57.56 | Dale Jones (ATG) | 4:01.34 | Everett Simpson (JAM) | 4:01.35 |
| 5000 metres | Kevin Pearson (BER) | 15:09.22 | Paul Bryan (JAM) | 15:27.03 | Michael Jules (BAR) | 16:07.29 |
| 110 metres hurdles | Andrew Parker (JAM) | 14.4 | Lennox Graham (JAM) | 14.8 | Sean Fox (BAH) | 15.0 |
| 400 metres hurdles | Everett Barham (JAM) | 54.06 | Lennox Graham (JAM) | 54.60 | Sean Fox (BAH) | 56.14 |
| High jump | Philippe Dogué (MTQ) | 2.17 | Dennis Richards (BAH) | 2.11 | Troy Glasgow (BER) | 2.05 |
| Pole vault | Brent Vanderpool (BAH) | 3.90 | Richard Parker (BAH) | 3.81 | Brooke Onley (BER) | 3.05 |
| Long jump | Joey Wells (BAH) | 7.80 | Lyndon Sands (BAH) | 7.42 | Eugene Licorish (GRN) | 7.15 |
| Triple jump | Lyndon Sands (BAH) | 16.02 | Teddy Roland (GLP) | 15.38 | Keith Carey (BAH) | 15.02 |
| Shot put | Georges Robin (GLP) | 15.39 | Sammy Brennan (BAH) | 12.81 | Eros Watts (JAM) | 12.67 |
| Discus throw | Egbert Mullings (BAH) | 44.96 | Steve Coy (TRI) | 42.56 | Joe Woodside (BAH) | 41.84 |
| Javelin throw | Joseph Antoine (TRI) | 64.96 | Philippe Dogué (MTQ) | 62.92 | Brooke Onley (BER) | 62.18 |
| 4 × 100 metres relay | Martinique | 41.11 | Bahamas | 41.18 | Jamaica | 41.28 |
| 4 × 400 metres relay | Trinidad and Tobago | 3:14.72 | Jamaica | 3:15.38 | Barbados | 3:15.74 |

=== Girls under 20 (Junior) ===
| Event | Gold | | Silver | | Bronze | |
|---|---|---|---|---|---|---|
| 100 metres (-2.5 m/s) | Marie-France Loval (GLP) | 11.68 | Pauline Davis (BAH) | 11.69 | Claudette Rano (MTQ) | 11.85 |
| 200 metres | Pauline Davis (BAH) | 23.57 | Christine Carda (MTQ) | 24.02 | Ethlyn Tate (JAM) | 24.15 |
| 400 metres | Veronica Williams (JAM) | 55.45 | Jocelyn Joseph (ATG) | 56.49 | Dawn Douglas (TRI) | 57.84 |
| 800 metres | Marie-Anna Filomin (GLP) | 2:10.65 | Sharon Powell (JAM) | 2:13.97 | Jocelyn Joseph (ATG) | 2:16.93 |
| 1500 metres | Marie-Anna Filomin (GLP) | 4:43.26 | Sharon Powell (JAM) | 4:46.48 | Daphne Fearon (JAM) | 4:47.42 |
| 3000 metres | Ellie Edwards (JAM) | 10:18.18 | Laverne Bryan (ATG) | 10:22.50 | Daphne Fearon (JAM) | 10:22.54 |
| 100 metres hurdles | Monique Millar (BAH) | 14.85 | Kay McConney (BAR) | 15.23 | Verna Hibbert (JAM) | 15.27 |
| High jump | Guy-Félixienne Marin (GLP) | 1.68 | Mina Adele (MTQ) | 1.68 | Donna Smith (BAH) | 1.65 |
| Long jump | Jacinta Bartholomew (GRN) | 5.88 | Euphemia Huggins (TRI) | 5.86 | Janine Tabar (GLP) | 5.48 |
| Shot put | Laverne Eve (BAH) | 14.39 | Jan Antoine (BAH) | 11.78 | Marie Lostra (MTQ) | 11.26 |
| Discus throw | Laverne Eve (BAH) | 42.90 | Jan Antoine (BAH) | 36.40 | Mary Francis (JAM) | 34.84 |
| Javelin throw | Laverne Eve (BAH) | 47.32 | Portia Wallace (BAH) | 40.20 | Rennet Celestine (TRI) | 39.66 |
| 4 × 100 metres relay | Jamaica | 46.00 | Bahamas | 46.31 | Martinique | 47.03 |
| 4 × 400 metres relay | Jamaica | 3:47.8 | Antigua and Barbuda | 3:54.8 | Bahamas | 4:01.3 |

=== Boys under 17 (Youth) ===
| Event | Gold | | Silver | | Bronze | |
|---|---|---|---|---|---|---|
| 100 metres | Michael Newbold (BAH) | 11.07 | David Velázquez (MTQ) | 11.14 | Mark Johnson (BAH) | 11.15 |
| 200 metres | Mark Johnson (BAH) | 21.93 | Michael Newbold (BAH) | 21.93 | Michael Worrell (BAR) | 22.39 |
| 400 metres | Michael Worrell (BAR) | 49.17 | Leslie Walker (JAM) | 49.80 | (Saint Christopher-Nevis-Anguilla) Bruce Nolan (SKN) | 51.00 |
| 800 metres | Kevin Smith (BER) | 1:59.80 | Otis Hoyte (BAR) | 2:01.16 | Paul Edwards (JAM) | 2:01.79 |
| 1500 metres | Kevin Smith (BER) | 4:07.91 | Paul Edwards (JAM) | 4:16.61 | Fulbert Théophile (GLP) | 4:17.11 |
| High jump | Rohan Phillips-Saunders (VIN) | 1.86 | Troy Kemp (BAH) | 1.86 | Daryl Walwyn (BER) | 1.80 |
| Long jump | Mark Johnson (BAH) | 6.82 | Delano Archer (BAH) | 6.78 | Pascal Maran (MTQ) | 6.34 |
| Triple jump | Lawrence Wendell (BAH) | 14.21 | Dudson Higgins (BAH) | 14.12 | Dwight Mitchell (JAM) | 13.99 |
| Shot put | Eddy Duguet (GLP) | 13.22 | Johnny Page (MTQ) | 12.92 | Adam Llewelyn (CAY) | 12.88 |
| Discus throw | Adam Llewelyn (CAY) | 39.30 | Zethroy Campbell (JAM) | 34.92 | Eddy Duguet (GLP) | 34.80 |
| Javelin throw | Kenwyn Williams (GRN) | 45.30* | Troy Kemp (BAH) | 44.64* | Johnny Page (MTQ) | 44.38* |

* One source states: Javelin only 600g rather than 700g.

=== Girls under 17 (Youth) ===
| Event | Gold | | Silver | | Bronze | |
|---|---|---|---|---|---|---|
| 100 metres | Gillian Forde (TRI) | 11.8 | Laurel Johnson (JAM) | 12.2 | Yolande Straughn (BAR) | 12.2 |
| 200 metres (3.9 m/s) | Gillian Forde (TRI) | 24.26w | Keva Mackey (BAH) | 24.57w | Laurel Johnson (JAM) | 24.65w |
| 400 metres | Donna Pryce (JAM) | 56.49 | Iyiechia Petrus (ISV) | 57.32 | Yolande Straughn (BAR) | 57.46 |
| 800 metres | Bernardette John (TRI) | 2:13.89 | Iyiechia Petrus (ISV) | 2:15.12 | Andrea Henderson (JAM) | 2:20.24? |
| 1500 metres | Marcia Smith (JAM) | 4:50.13 | Sheraldine Dalrymple (BAR) | 4:50.17 | Charmaine Hood (GRN) | 4:50.88 |
| High jump | Dolores Daquin (MTQ) | 1.71 | Mazel Thomas (JAM) | 1.68 | Jean-Marie Martine (MTQ) | 1.68 |
| Long jump | Mazel Thomas (JAM) | 5.50 | Catherine Richards (BAR) | 5.42 | Cheryl Munroe (BAH) | 5.39 |
| Shot put | France-Aimée Coquin (GLP) | 11.63 | Millicent McCartney (BAH) | 10.37 | Helena Harry (VIN) | 10.17 |
| Discus throw | Millicent McCartney (BAH) | 34.66 | France-Aimée Coquin (GLP) | 31.60 | Juliana King (BAR) | 26.28 |
| Javelin throw | Allison Bernard (TRI) | 29.86 | Eurise Farquharson (BAH) | 28.18 | Millicent McCartney (BAH) | 19.54 |

== Medal table (unofficial) ==
* Host nation (Martinique)

| Rank | Nation | Gold | Silver | Bronze | Total |
|---|---|---|---|---|---|
| 1 | Bahamas (BAH) | 14 | 19 | 9 | 42 |
| 2 | Jamaica (JAM) | 11 | 12 | 14 | 37 |
| 3 | Guadeloupe (GLP) | 7 | 2 | 4 | 13 |
| 4 | Trinidad and Tobago (TTO) | 7 | 2 | 3 | 12 |
| 5 | Martinique (MTQ)* | 4 | 5 | 6 | 15 |
| 6 | Bermuda (BER) | 4 | 0 | 4 | 8 |
| 7 | Grenada (GRN) | 2 | 0 | 2 | 4 |
| 8 | Barbados (BAR) | 1 | 5 | 6 | 12 |
| 9 | Cayman Islands (CAY) | 1 | 0 | 1 | 2 |
| 9 | Saint Vincent and the Grenadines (VIN) | 1 | 0 | 1 | 2 |
| 11 | Antigua and Barbuda (ATG) | 0 | 5 | 1 | 6 |
| 12 | U.S. Virgin Islands (VIR) | 0 | 2 | 0 | 2 |
| 13 | Saint Christopher-Nevis-Anguilla (SCN) | 0 | 0 | 1 | 1 |
| Totals (13 entries) | | 52 | 52 | 52 | 156 |
