= 1984 CARIFTA Games =

XIII CARIFTA Games
- Dates: April 21–23
- Host city: Nassau, Bahamas (The Bahamas)
- Level: Junior and Youth
- Events: 52
- Participation: at least 104 athletes from at least 10 nations

The 13th CARIFTA Games was held in Nassau, Bahamas on April 21–23, 1984.

== Participation (unofficial) ==
For the 1984 CARIFTA Games only the medalists can be found on the "World Junior Athletics History" website. An unofficial count yields the number of about 104 medalists (60 junior (under-20) and 44 youth (under-17)) from about 10 countries: Antigua and Barbuda (1), Bahamas (35), Barbados (13), Bermuda (5), Cayman Islands (3), Jamaica (29), Martinique (5), Netherlands Antilles (1), Suriname (1), Trinidad and Tobago (11).

== Austin Sealy Award ==
The Austin Sealy Trophy for the most outstanding athlete of the games was awarded to Pauline Davis from the Bahamas. She won 2 gold medals (100m, and 200m) in the junior (U-20) category. In addition, she was probably part of at least one of the medal winning relay teams (there is no information on the team members).

== Medal summary ==
Medal winners are published by category: Boys under 20 (Junior), Girls under 20 (Junior), Boys under 17 (Youth), and Girls under 17 (Youth). The medalists can also be found on the "World Junior Athletics History" website.

=== Boys under 20 (Junior) ===
Event	Gold		Silver		Bronze	
100 metres	Ray Stewart (JAM)	10.2	Greg Meghoo (JAM)	10.3	William Trott (BER)	10.6
200 metres	Greg Meghoo (JAM)	21.41	Owen McGregor (JAM)	21.50	Michael Newbold (BAH)	21.54
400 metres	Michael Worrell (BAR)	47.48	Owen McGregor (JAM)	47.91	Steven Smith (BAH)	48.06
800 metres	Everett Simpson (JAM)	1:53.0	Romel Kargail (BAH)	1:53.3	Steven Smith (BAH)	1:53.9
1500 metres	Paul Bryan (JAM)	3:53.8	Romel Kargail (BAH)	3:56.9	Everett Simpson (JAM)	3:58.1
5000 metres	Paul Bryan (JAM)	15:23.7	Kevin Pearson (BER)	15:47.0	Michael Jules (BAR)	16:25.0
110 metres hurdles	Carlton Aitken (JAM)	14.12	Donald Burke (JAM)	14.34	Allan Ince (BAR)	14.56
400 metres hurdles	Richard Bucknor (JAM)	52.5	Winthrop Graham (JAM)	53.8	Richard White (BAR)	56.3
High jump	Troy Glasgow (BER)	2.11	Troy Kemp (BAH)	2.11	Donville Buchanan (JAM)	2.03
Pole vault	Doyle Peete (BAH)	3.96	Brent Vanderpool (BAH)	3.81	Locksley Walters (JAM)	2.74
Long jump	Joey Wells (BAH)	7.36	William Trott (BER)	7.32	Byron Ferguson (BAH)	7.05
Triple jump	Wendell Lawrence (BAH)	15.14	Lauren Stewart (BER)	14.89	Locksley Walters (JAM)	14.71
Shot put	Eyian Robotham (JAM)	13.23	Wesley Francis (TRI)	13.07	Joe Woodside (BAH)	12.87
Discus throw	Egbert Mullings (BAH)	48.71	Joe Woodside (BAH)	46.04	Adrian Brown (JAM)	45.50
Javelin throw	Wesley Francis (TRI)	63.65	Joseph Antoine (TRI)	55.19	Paul Hurlston (CAY)	54.28
4 × 100 metres relay	Jamaica	41.0	Bahamas	41.6	Barbados	41.7
4 × 400 metres relay	Jamaica	3:13.9	Bahamas	3:14.4	Barbados	3:15.2

=== Girls under 20 (Junior) ===
Event	Gold		Silver		Bronze	
100 metres	Pauline Davis (BAH)	11.1	Eldece Clarke (BAH)	11.3	Gillian Forde (TRI)	11.4
200 metres	Pauline Davis (BAH)	23.80	Gillian Forde (TRI)	24.10	Christine Carda (MTQ)	24.29
400 metres	Christine Carda (MTQ)	55.88	Monique Millar (BAH)	55.97	Janice Malcolm (JAM)	56.57
800 metres	Bernardette John (TRI)	2:12.15	Laverne Bryan (ATG)	2:14.01	Roxanne Vincent (TRI)	2:14.7
1500 metres	Laverne Bryan (ATG)	4:47.6	Bernardette John (TRI)	4:48.9	Roxanne Vincent (TRI)	4:49.8
3000 metres	Ellie Edwards (JAM)	10:23.56	Laverne Bryan (ATG)	NTT	Rochelle McKenzie (BAH)	NTT
100 metres hurdles	Monique Millar (BAH)	14.40	Carmel Major (BAH)	14.98	Nadine Ebanks (JAM)	15.14
High jump	Mina Adele (MTQ)	1.75	Mazel Thomas (JAM)	1.73	Dionne Bruff (JAM)	1.73
Long jump	Catherine Richards (BAR)	5.83	Euphemia Huggins (TRI)	5.75	Juliet Maingot (TRI)	5.65
Shot put	Laverne Eve (BAH)	14.66	Patricia Curry (BAH)	11.96	Jacqueline Kennedy (BER)	11.47
Discus throw	Laverne Eve (BAH)	46.40	Nolette Boelijn (AHO)	32.24	Patricia Curry (BAH)	31.48
Javelin throw	Laverne Eve (BAH)	50.14	Jean Minus (BAH)	38.24	Rennet Celestine (TRI)	37.44
4 × 100 metres relay	Jamaica	45.8	Bahamas	45.8	Trinidad and Tobago	46.4
4 × 400 metres relay	Bahamas	3:44.3	Trinidad and Tobago	3:45.0	Jamaica	3:47.0

=== Boys under 17 (Youth) ===
Event	Gold		Silver		Bronze	
100 metres	Ricky Austin (BAR)	10.80	Colin O'Brien (BAH)	10.85	Brian Benn (BAR)	10.85
200 metres	Brian Benn (BAR)	22.45	Oscar Skippings (BAH)	22.63	Colin O'Brien (BAH)	22.75
400 metres	Lyndale Patterson (JAM)	49.55	Oscar Skippings (BAH)	49.56	Anthony Wallace (JAM)	49.70
800 metres	Fitzroy Morrison (JAM)	1:58.7	Paul Coley (JAM)	1:58.8	Peter Hospedales (TRI)	1:59.9
1500 metres	Paul Coley (JAM)	4:19.1	Fitzroy Morrison (JAM)	4:22.0	Michael Bullard (BAH)	4:22.2
High jump	Joël Vincent (MTQ)	1.95	Cardinal Neely (BAH)	1.95	Anthony Ricketts (JAM)	1.90
Long jump	Delano Archer (BAH)	6.89	Mark Johnson (BAH)	6.74	Edward Manderson (CAY)	6.72
Triple jump	Alvin Haynes (BAR)	14.90	Delano Archer (BAH)	14.46	John Nixon (BAH)	14.31
Shot put	Troy Patterson (BAR)	12.78	Colin Newton (BAH)	12.74	Michael Hill (JAM)	12.33
Discus throw	Michael Hill (JAM)	46.00	Jeffrey Marcelle (TRI)	42.57	Colin Newton (BAH)	34.78
Javelin throw	Colin O'Brien (BAH)	50.71	Glenroy Morris (BAR)	48.12	Troy Patterson (BAR)	46.69

=== Girls under 17 (Youth) ===
Event	Gold		Silver		Bronze	
100 metres	Yolande Straughn (BAR)	11.73	Nicole Charles (TRI)	11.83	Sheena Sturrup (BAH)	11.87
200 metres	Sheena Sturrup (BAH)	24.2	Yolande Straughn (BAR)	24.4	Keva Mackey (BAH)	24.7
400 metres	Patricia Wisdom (BAH)	54.73	Sandie Richards (JAM)	54.81	Sheena Sturrup (BAH)	55.46
800 metres	Judith Campbell (JAM)	2:15.1	Mariska Stubbs (BAH)	2:15.6	Andrea Henderson (JAM)	2:18.3
1500 metres	Judith Campbell (JAM)	4:47.7	Mireille Sankatsing (SUR)	4:50.4	Andrea Henderson (JAM)	4:53.5
High jump	Judy McDonald (JAM)	1.67	Jean-Marie Martine (MTQ)	1.65	Natasha Brown (BAH)	1.65
Long jump	Natasha Brown (BAH)	5.57	Jackie Edwards (BAH)	5.41	Dahlia Duhaney (JAM)	5.32
Shot put	Millicent McCartney (BAH)	12.52	Marie-José Alger (MTQ)	10.75	Cassell Watson (BAR)	9.76
Discus throw	Millicent McCartney (BAH)	39.04	Cassell Watson (BAR)	23.80	Eurise Farquharson (BAH)	20.58
Javelin throw	Eurise Farquharson (BAH)	36.58	Audrey Wellington (CAY)	33.32	Pamela Levine (BAR)	31.32

== Medal table (unofficial) ==
* Host nation (Bahamas)

Rank	Nation	Gold	Silver	Bronze	Total
1	Bahamas (BAH)*	19	22	16	57
2	Jamaica (JAM)	19	9	15	43
3	Barbados (BAR)	7	3	9	19
4	Martinique (MTQ)	3	2	1	6
5	Trinidad and Tobago (TTO)	2	8	7	17
6	Bermuda (BER)	1	3	2	6
7	Antigua and Barbuda (ATG)	1	2	0	3
8	Cayman Islands (CAY)	0	1	2	3
9	Netherlands Antilles (AHO)	0	1	0	1
9	Suriname (SUR)	0	1	0	1
Totals (10 entries)		52	52	52	156
