= 1982 CARIFTA Games =

XI CARIFTA Games
- Dates: April 10–12
- Host city: Kingston, Jamaica
- Level: Junior and Youth
- Events: 52
- Participation: about 154 athletes from 15 nations

The 11th CARIFTA Games was held in Kingston, Jamaica on April 10–12, 1982.

== Participation (unofficial) ==
Detailed result lists can be found on the "World Junior Athletics History" website. An unofficial count yields the number of about 154 athletes (112 junior (under-20) and 42 youth (under-17)) from about 15 countries: Antigua and Barbuda (4), Bahamas (39), Bermuda (10), British Virgin Islands (2), Cayman Islands (5), Grenada (3), Guadeloupe (9), Guyana (2), Jamaica (45), Martinique (5), Saint Vincent and the Grenadines (2), Trinidad and Tobago (11), Turks and Caicos Islands (2).

== Austin Sealy Award ==
The Austin Sealy Trophy for the most outstanding athlete of the games was awardeded to Laverne Eve from the Bahamas. She won 3 gold medals (shot put, discus throw, and javelin throw) in the junior (U-20) category.

== Medal summary ==
Medal winners are published by category: Boys under 20 (Junior), Girls under 20 (Junior), Boys under 17 (Youth), and Girls under 17 (Youth). Complete results can be found on the "World Junior Athletics History" website.

=== Boys under 20 (Junior) ===
Event	Gold		Silver		Bronze	
100 metres	Earle Laing (JAM)	10.48	Ruthven Prithwie (TRI)	10.64	Lester Benjamin (ATG)	10.74
200 metres	Ruthven Prithwie (TRI)	21.9	Nick Saunders (BER)	22.0	Phil Lewis (BAH)	22.0
400 metres	Joseph Boyd (JAM)	47.64	Fenton Hugg (JAM)	48.00	Phil Lewis (BAH)	48.41
800 metres	Michael Lawson (JAM)	1:52.5	Damian Mendoza (TRI)	1:53.1	Horace Moore (GUY)	1:53.2
1500 metres	Jean-Marc Lebielle (MTQ)	4:02.18	Joël Hégésippe (GLP)	4:02.60	Victor Théophile (GLP)	4:02.84
5000 metres	Kevin Pearson (BER)	15:32.8	Garfield McAnuff (JAM)	15:37.6	Anthony Charles (GRN)	15:52.4
110 metres hurdles	Orville Gayle (JAM)	14.03	Gerald Martin (JAM)	14.76	Sammy Brennan (BAH)	14.83
400 metres hurdles	Orville Gayle (JAM)	55.2	Sammy Brennan (BAH)	55.5	John Pugh (BAH)	55.6
High jump	Nick Saunders (BER)	2.13	Philippe Dogué (MTQ)	2.10	Wendell Collie (BAH)	2.08
Pole vault	Evan Wisdom (BAH)	3.88	Richard Parker (BAH)	3.65		
Long jump	Joey Wells (BAH)	7.21	Lester Benjamin (ATG)	7.20	Leonard Frazer (JAM)	7.13
Triple jump	Lester Benjamin (ATG)	15.32	Deryck Lorde (BAR)	14.24	Leonard Frazer (JAM)	13.98
Shot put	Thierry Liveze (GLP)	14.47	Eros Watts (JAM)	13.92	Ellsworth Christopher (BER)	13.80
Discus throw	Stanford Moss (BAH)	50.48	Egbert Mullings (BAH)	48.22	Paul Williams (JAM)	45.60
Javelin throw	Brooke Onley (BER)	64.80	Leslie Patterson (BAR)	58.36	Wendell Collie (BAH)	55.98
4 × 100 metres relay	Jamaica; Greg Meghoo; O. Martin; Ray Stewart; Earle Laing	41.7	Bahamas	41.9	Trinidad and Tobago	43.0
4 × 400 metres relay	Jamaica; Michael Lawson; Fenton Hugg; Mark Senior; Joseph Boyd	3:11.75	Trinidad and Tobago	3:14.83	Barbados	3:15.06

=== Girls under 20 (Junior) ===
Event	Gold		Silver		Bronze	
100 metres	Marie-France Loval (GLP)	11.60	Veronica Findlay (JAM)	11.92	Claudette Rano (MTQ)	12.04
200 metres	Sharon Barnes (JAM)	24.4	Candy Ford (BER)	24.7	Eldece Clarke (BAH)	24.7
400 metres	Yvonne Shields (JAM)	54.46	Veronica Williams (JAM)	54.94	Yolande Small (TRI)	55.79
800 metres	Marie-Anna Filomin (GLP)	2:11.9	Jocelyn Joseph (ATG)	2:12.1	Sharon Powell (JAM)	2:12.6
1500 metres	Daphne Fearon (JAM)	4:47.24	Eugenie Beason (JAM)	4:47.85	Laverne Bryan (ATG)	4:57.87
3000 metres	Margaret Williams (JAM)	10:28.8	Daphne Fearon (JAM)	10:35.2	Rachelle Miller (BAH)	10:57.6
100 metres hurdles	Karlene Allen (JAM)	15.1	Andrene Anderson (JAM)	15.6		
High jump	Murielle Dumoulin (GLP)	1.67	Janelle Kelly (TRI)	1.65	Sharon Barnes (JAM)	1.62
Long jump	Andrene Anderson (JAM)	5.82	Sharon Barnes (JAM)	5.43	Jacinta Bartholomew (GRN)	5.40
Shot put	Laverne Eve (BAH)	13.66	Elaine Morris (JAM)	13.02	Jean-Claire Chathuant (GLP)	12.71
Discus throw	Laverne Eve (BAH)	39.60	Carol Brown (JAM)	38.55	Marie-Claire Hilaire (MTQ)	38.50
Javelin throw	Laverne Eve (BAH)	48.62	Portia Wallace (BAH)	39.73	Carol Brown (JAM)	39.44
4 × 100 metres relay	Jamaica	46.3	Trinidad and Tobago	46.9	Bahamas	46.9
4 × 400 metres relay	Trinidad and Tobago	3:42.04	Jamaica	3:42.18	Bahamas	3:50.76

=== Boys under 17 (Youth) ===
Event	Gold		Silver		Bronze	
100 metres	Shane Howell (JAM)	11.11	Ron Roberts (TRI)	11.14	Edmund Moxey (BAH)	11.19
200 metres	Michael Newbold (BAH)	22.5	Shane Howell (JAM)	22.9	Mark Johnson (BAH)	23.0
400 metres	Nicholas Tracey (JAM)	49.57	Michael Warren (JAM)	50.12	Frank Fileteau (ISV)	50.48
800 metres	Kevin Smith (BER)	1:56.7	Frank Fileteau (ISV)	1:57.5	Deryck Codrington (BAR)	1:59.7
1500 metres	Kevin Smith (BER)	4:07.80	Sebastian Warner (VIN)	4:11.16	Michael Jules (BAR)	4:16.24
High jump	Troy Kemp (BAH)	1.95	Robert Douglas (JAM)	1.93	Rohan Phillips-Saunders (VIN)	1.88
Long jump	Michael Newbold (BAH)	6.48	Andre Pickering (IVB)	6.39	Michael Warren (JAM)	6.37
Triple jump	Gwyn Jones (JAM)	14.65	Godfrey Augustine (GRN)	13.80	Byron Ferguson (BAH)	13.42
Shot put	Georges Robin (GLP)	15.03	Gwyn Jones (JAM)	14.50	Joseph Antoine (TRI)	13.38
Discus throw	Joe Woodside (BAH)	49.78	Gwyn Jones (JAM)	48.88	Joseph Antoine (TRI)	42.92
Javelin throw	Joseph Antoine (TRI)	58.00	Anthony Botwick (BAH)	50.07	Godfrey Augustine (GRN)	47.69

=== Girls under 17 (Youth) ===
Event	Gold		Silver		Bronze	
100 metres	Laurel Johnson (JAM)	12.10	Pauline Davis (BAH)	12.19	Donna Pryce (JAM)	12.31
200 metres	Laurel Johnson (JAM)	24.7	Pauline Davis (BAH)	25.1	Yolande Straughn (BAR)	25.1
400 metres	Andrea Thomas (JAM)	55.61	Rosemarie Bailey (JAM)	56.00	Iyiechia Petrus (ISV)	57.36
800 metres	Andrea Thomas (JAM)	2:13.1	Bernardette John (TRI)	2:16.3	Sandra Wellington (CAY)	2:19.1
1500 metres	Janet Knight (JAM)	4:44.39	Tabitha Parchment (CAY)	4:48.10	Sandra Wellington (CAY)	5:00.54
High jump	Dionne Bruff (JAM)	1.67	Mazel Thomas (JAM)	1.62	Donna Smith (BAH)	1.62
Long jump	Edna Mae Tuzo (BER)	5.27	Mazel Thomas (JAM)	5.11	Claudia Anderson (JAM)	4.95
Shot put	Nicole Taylor (BAH)	10.08	Carla Rockley (BAH)	9.30		
Discus throw	Nicole Taylor (BAH)	28.37	Carla Rockley (BAH)	22.57	Claudia Anderson (JAM)	17.43
Javelin throw	Jean Minus (BAH)	32.80	Nicole Taylor (BAH)	19.23		

== Medal table (unofficial) ==
* Host nation (Jamaica)

Rank	Nation	Gold	Silver	Bronze	Total
1	Jamaica (JAM)*	23	21	10	54
2	Bahamas (BAH)	13	11	14	38
3	Bermuda (BER)	6	2	1	9
4	Guadeloupe (GLP)	5	1	2	8
5	Trinidad and Tobago (TTO)	3	7	4	14
6	Antigua and Barbuda (ATG)	1	2	2	5
7	Martinique (MTQ)	1	1	2	4
8	Barbados (BAR)	0	2	4	6
9	Grenada (GRN)	0	1	3	4
10	Cayman Islands (CAY)	0	1	2	3
10	U.S. Virgin Islands (VIR)	0	1	2	3
12	Saint Vincent and the Grenadines (VIN)	0	1	1	2
13	British Virgin Islands (IVB)	0	1	0	1
14	Guyana (GUY)	0	0	1	1
Totals (14 entries)		52	52	48	152
