= 1985 CARIFTA Games =

XIV CARIFTA Games
- Dates: April 7–9
- Host city: Bridgetown, Barbados
- Level: Junior and Youth
- Events: 52
- Participation: at least 116 athletes from at least 16 nations

The 14th CARIFTA Games was held in Bridgetown, Barbados, on April 7–9, 1985.

== Participation (unofficial) ==
For the 1985 CARIFTA Games only the medalists can be found on the "World Junior Athletics History" website. An unofficial count yields the number of about 116 medalists (67 junior (under-20) and 49 youth (under-17)) from about 16 countries: Bahamas (30), Barbados (12), Bermuda (4), Cayman Islands (4), Dominica (2), Grenada (1), Guadeloupe (9), Guyana (1), Jamaica (36), Martinique (3), Netherlands Antilles (2), Saint Lucia (1), Saint Vincent and the Grenadines (1), Suriname (1), Trinidad and Tobago (6), US Virgin Islands (3).

== Austin Sealy Award ==
The Austin Sealy Trophy for the most outstanding athlete of the games was awarded to Andrea Thomas from Jamaica. She won 2 gold medals (400m, and 800m) in the junior (U-20) category. In addition, she was probably part of at least one of the medal winning relay teams (there is no information on the team members).

== Medal summary ==
Medal winners are published by category: Boys under 20 (Junior), Girls under 20 (Junior), Boys under 17 (Youth), and Girls under 17 (Youth). The medalists can also be found on the "World Junior Athletics History" website.

=== Boys under 20 (Junior) ===
Event	Gold		Silver		Bronze	
100 metres	Michael Newbold (BAH)	10.74	Dazel Jules (TRI)	10.75	Jimmy Flemming (ISV)	10.80
200 metres	Jimmy Flemming (ISV)	21.65	Mark Johnson (BAH)	21.68	Rommel Liverpool (TRI)	21.76
400 metres	Lyndale Patterson (JAM)	47.87	Bruce Phillip (DMA)	48.03	Byron Ferguson (BAH)	48.25
800 metres	Anthony Christie (JAM)	1:55.62	Ernest Barrett (JAM)	1:56.07	Kevin Smith (BER)	1:56.09
1500 metres	Anthony Christie (JAM)	4:05.19	Kevin Smith (BER)	4:05.47	Michael Jules (BAR)	4:05.50
5000 metres	Mark Elliott (JAM)	15:26.19	Steve Agar (DMA)	15:42.94	Kenroy Levy (JAM)	15:54.71
110 metres hurdles	Carlton Aitken (JAM)	14.55	Michael Forbes (JAM)	14.56	George Knowles (BAH)	14.69
400 metres hurdles	Richard Bucknor (JAM)	53.43	Allan Ince (BAR)	54.90	Michael Forbes (JAM)	55.19
High jump	Troy Kemp (BAH)	2.13	Guy Labylle (GLP)	2.04	Daryl Walwyn (BER)	1.93
Pole vault	Brent Johnson (BAH)	3.96	Doyle Peete (BAH)	3.23	Michael Russell (JAM)	3.23
Long jump	Edward Manderson (CAY)	7.10	Mark Johnson (BAH)	7.04	Greg Williams (JAM)	6.95
Triple jump	Garfield Anselm (GLP)	16.03	Frantz Porier (GLP)	15.63	Wendell Lawrence (BAH)	14.99
Shot put	Georges Robin (GLP)	15.39	Joe Woodside (BAH)	14.21	Rohan Webb (JAM)	13.02
Discus throw	Joe Woodside (BAH)	43.94	Adrian Brown (JAM)	41.91	Adam Llewelyn (CAY)	38.58
Javelin throw	Joseph Antoine (TRI)	65.40	Paul Hurlston (CAY)	56.42	Godfrey Augustine (GRN)	56.06
4 × 100 metres relay	Trinidad and Tobago	40.82	Jamaica	41.45	Bahamas	41.74
4 × 400 metres relay	Jamaica	3:12.0	Bahamas	3:14.0	Barbados	3:28.85

=== Girls under 20 (Junior) ===
Event	Gold		Silver		Bronze	
100 metres	Ethlyn Tate (JAM)	11.88	Yolande Straughn (BAR)	11.89	Pauline Chambers (JAM)	12.07
200 metres	Yolande Straughn (BAR)	24.34	Ethlyn Tate (JAM)	24.40	Pauline Chambers (JAM)	24.54
400 metres	Andrea Thomas (JAM)	53.54	Janice Carter (JAM)	54.29	Flora Hyacinth (ISV)	54.70
800 metres	Andrea Thomas (JAM)	2:07.96	Sandie Richards (JAM)	2:13.18	Iyiechia Petrus (ISV)	2:14.75
1500 metres	Beverley McNeil (JAM)	4:47.18	Ellie Edwards (JAM)	4:50.43	Deborah Moise (LCA)	4:54.77
3000 metres	Ellie Edwards (JAM)	10:41.25	Herta Ebanks (CAY)	10:53.14	Rochelle McKenzie (BAH)	11:09.04
100 metres hurdles	Sophia Brown (JAM)	14.96	Maureen Wiltshire (JAM)	15.28	Nancy Boyce (BAR)	15.62
High jump	Mazel Thomas (JAM)	1.66	Dionne Bruff (JAM)	1.66	Judy McDonald (BAH)	1.60
Long jump	Mazel Thomas (JAM)	5.81	Catherine Richards (BAR)	5.63	Heather Lynch (BAR)	5.50
Shot put	Millicent McCartney (BAH)	12.30	Patricia Curry (BAH)	11.68	Tania Pemba (GLP)	11.32
Discus throw	Sherry Howell (AHO)	41.04	Millicent McCartney (BAH)	39.82	Janice Daley (JAM)	37.18
Javelin throw	Sherry Howell (AHO)	42.20	Rennet Celestine (TRI)	41.86	Dornel Butler (BAH)	37.46
4 × 100 metres relay	Jamaica	46.69	Bahamas	46.81	United States Virgin Islands	48.09
4 × 400 metres relay	Jamaica	3:42.68	Bahamas	3:46.92	United States Virgin Islands	3:50.48

=== Boys under 17 (Youth) ===
Event	Gold		Silver		Bronze	
100 metres	Pascal Théophile (GLP)	10.94	Garland Miller (BAH)	11.13	Glendale Miller (BAH)	11.16
200 metres	Glendale Miller (BAH)	21.92	Carey Johnson (JAM)	21.96	Garland Miller (BAH)	22.02
400 metres	Carey Johnson (JAM)	49.12	Barrington Campbell (JAM)	49.56	Christian Landre-Cornano (GLP)	50.01
800 metres	Ashton Cherubin (BAR)	1:59.36	Floyd Ambrister (BAH)	1:59.65	Curtan Smith (JAM)	1:59.73?
1500 metres	Leroy Webley (JAM)	4:15.64	Martin Forde (BAR)	4:16.20	Ashton Cherubin (BAR)	4:16.82
High jump	Joël Vincent (MTQ)	1.99	Emile Ledee (BAH)	1.96	Darnell Ranger (BAH)	1.85
Long jump	Mark Mason (GUY)	6.94	John Edwards (BAH)	6.71	Patrice Boisdur (GLP)	6.69
Triple jump	Georges Sainte-Rose (MTQ)	14.02	Bradley Frazer (BAH)	13.64	Darnell Ranger (BAH)	13.50
Shot put	Adolphus Nichols (TRI)	13.06	Kevin Culmer (BAH)	12.86	Peter Malpas (BER)	12.45
Discus throw	Linval Swaby (JAM)	40.78	Nelson Braafhart (AHO)	38.99	Adolphus Nichols (TRI)	38.78
Javelin throw	Adrian Bullen (BAR)	52.04	Kevin Smith (BAH)	51.48	Kevin Culmer (BAH)	49.64

=== Girls under 17 (Youth) ===
Event	Gold		Silver		Bronze	
100 metres	Beverly McDonald (JAM)	11.99	Sheena Sturrup (BAH)	12.09	Keva Mackey (BAH)	12.19
200 metres	Keva Mackey (BAH)	24.21	Beverly McDonald (JAM)	24.22	Sheena Sturrup (BAH)	24.52
400 metres	Francine Landre (GLP)	57.07	Sheena Sturrup (BAH)	57.53	Patricia Wisdom (BAH)	57.58
800 metres	Judith Campbell (JAM)	2:15.07	Mireille Sankatsing (SUR)	2:15.80	Rochelle Millar (BAH)	2:15.86
1500 metres	Judith Campbell (JAM)	4:46.34	Joclyn Connage (JAM)	4:48.77	Rochelle Millar (BAH)	4:49.26
High jump	Michelle Alleyne (TRI)	1.67	Nicole Springer (BAR)	1.64	Lorraine Bartley (JAM)	1.55
Long jump	Dahlia Duhaney (JAM)	5.50	Natasha Brown (BAH)	5.48	Jacqueline Ross (VIN)	5.47
Shot put	Marie-José Alger (MTQ)	11.35	Leslie Rooks (BER)	10.94	Denise Taylor (BAH)	10.12
Discus throw	Michelle Heron (JAM)	35.20	Leslie Rooks (BER)	34.81	Ann-Marie Higgins (JAM)	34.42
Javelin throw	Joy-Ann Best (BAR)	35.46	Pamela Levine (BAR)	34.80	Eurise Farquharson (BAH)	34.42

== Medal table (unofficial) ==
* Host nation (Barbados)

Rank	Nation	Gold	Silver	Bronze	Total
1	Jamaica (JAM)	25	14	11	50
2	Bahamas (BAH)	7	19	19	45
3	Barbados (BAR)*	4	6	5	15
4	Guadeloupe (GLP)	4	2	3	9
5	Trinidad and Tobago (TTO)	4	2	2	8
6	Martinique (MTQ)	3	0	0	3
7	Netherlands Antilles (AHO)	2	1	0	3
8	Cayman Islands (CAY)	1	2	1	4
9	U.S. Virgin Islands (VIR)	1	0	5	6
10	Guyana (GUY)	1	0	0	1
11	Bermuda (BER)	0	3	3	6
12	Dominica (DMA)	0	2	0	2
13	Suriname (SUR)	0	1	0	1
14	Grenada (GRN)	0	0	1	1
14	Saint Lucia (LCA)	0	0	1	1
14	Saint Vincent and the Grenadines (VIN)	0	0	1	1
Totals (16 entries)		52	52	52	156
