= 1984 Central American and Caribbean Junior Championships in Athletics =

VI Central American and Caribbean Junior Championships
- Dates: 21–24 June
- Host city: San Juan, Puerto Rico
- Level: Junior and Youth
- Events: 75 (39 junior, 36 youth)
- Participation: about 355 (186 junior, 169 youth) athletes from 19 nations

The 6th Central American and Caribbean Junior Championships was a junior athletics competition held between the Central American and Caribbean nations, held in San Juan, Puerto Rico, on 21–24 June 1984.

== Medal summary ==
Medal winners are published by category: Junior A, Male, Junior A, Female, and Junior B. Complete results can be found on the World Junior Athletics History website.

=== Male Junior A (under 20) ===
Event	Gold		Silver		Bronze	
100 metres (3.0 m/s)	Steve Morgan (JAM)	10.56 w	William Trott (BER)	10.64 w	Fernando Ramsey (PAN)	10.65 w
200 metres (2.5 m/s)	Steve Morgan (JAM)	21.17 w	Owen McGregor (JAM)	21.24 w	Wilfredo Benítez (PUR)	21.45 w
400 metres	Aaron Phillips (VEN)	46.77	Steven Smith (BAH)	48.38	Randolph Thomas (SKN)	48.57
800 metres	Romel Kargail (BAH)	1:52.92	Kavin Smith (BER)	1:53.77	Steven Smith (BAH)	1:53.91
1500 metres	Ventura García (MEX)	3:57.45	Kavin Smith (BER)	3:58.31	Romel Kargail (BAH)	3:58.69
5000 metres	Roberto López (MEX)	14:10.00	Emiliano Reyes (MEX)	14:54.08	Luis Cruz (PUR)	15:01.86
10,000 metres	Luis Cruz (PUR)	31:39.7	Osvaldo Santiago (PUR)	31:40.6	Eustacio Santiago (PUR)	31:47.0
Half Marathon	José Rivas (PUR)	1:13:50	Ramón Ortero (PUR)	1:14:02	John de Jesús (PUR)	1:16:30
3000 metres steeplechase	Roberto López (MEX)	9:02.99	Víctor Heredia (MEX)	9:23.79	Sammy Laureano (PUR)	9:49.79
110 metres hurdles (3.5 m/s)	Andrew Parker (JAM)	14.19 w	Pedro Sánchez (PUR)	15.10 w	Richard White (BAR)	15.76 w
400 metres hurdles	Andrew Parker (JAM)	53.33	Domingo Cordero (PUR)	53.37	Richard White (BAR)	53.48
High jump	Troy Kemp (BAH)	2.12	Antonio Burgos (PUR)	2.06	Troy Glasgow (BER)	2.06
Pole vault	Carlos González (PUR)	4.60	Efrain Meléndez (PUR)	4.50	Miguel Saldarriaga (COL)	4.50
Long jump	Joey Wells (BAH)	7.55	Barry Moxey (BAH)	7.27	David Caddle (BAR)	7.20
Triple jump	Locksley Walters (JAM)	15.38	Osvaldo Zabala (VEN)	15.33	Barry Moxey (BAH)	15.10
Shot put	Francisco Valentín (PUR)	14.73	José Setién (PUR)	14.32	Gregorio Barrios (VEN)	13.73
Discus throw	Joe Woodside (BAH)	45.74	Adrian Brown (JAM)	44.66	Wesley Francis (TRI)	42.00
Hammer throw	David Castrillón (COL)	56.32	Javier Rivera (PUR)	41.38	Julio Ramos (PUR)	39.12
Javelin throw	Joseph Antoine (TRI)	63.56	Wesley Francis (TRI)	62.78	Víctor Gómez (DOM)	62.14
Decathlon	Ron McPhee (BAH)	6378	Juan Roig (PUR)	5936	Sean Burrows (BAH)	5654
10,000 metres track walk	Carlos Mercenario (MEX)	46:48.7	Joel Sánchez (MEX)	48:07.0	Reynaldo Martínez (PUR)	53:29.0
4 × 100 metres relay	Jamaica; Stephenson; Andrew Parker; Steve Morgan; Owen McGregor	41.02	Puerto Rico; Wilfredo Benítez; Bernabé Williams; Víctor Andino; Mickey Soto	41.51	Bahamas; Ron McPhee; Byron Ferguson; Joey Wells; Michael Newbold	42.74
4 × 400 metres relay	Jamaica; Owen McGregor; Steve Morgan; Campbell; Stephenson	3:12.70	Puerto Rico; Víctor Andino; Pedro Martínez; Rodríguez; Wilfredo Benítez	3:12.80	Venezuela; Jesús Malavé; Jesús García; Luis Bello; Aaron Phillips	3:14.14

=== Female Junior A (under 20) ===
Event	Gold		Silver		Bronze	
100 metres (2.0 m/s)	Gillian Forde (TRI)	11.63	Jenny Fuentes (PUR)	12.06	María Báez (DOM)	12.18
200 metres (4.0 m/s)	Gillian Forde (TRI)	23.78 w	Irina Ambulo (PAN)	24.23 w	Carlon Blackman (BAR)	24.42 w
400 metres	Carlon Blackman (BAR)	53.42	Maxine McMillan (TRI)	53.81	Irina Ambulo (PAN)	54.53
800 metres	Laverne Bryan (ATG)	2:13.00	Ramona Rosario (PUR)	2:13.95	Roxanne Vincent (TRI)	2:14.81
1500 metres	Ramona Rosario (PUR)	4:40.99	Susana Luna (MEX)	4:43.89	Maritza Otalvaro (COL)	4:46.07
3000 metres	Santa Velázquez (MEX)	9:43.23	Ileana Arroyo (PUR)	10:14.88	Reina Rojas (VEN)	10:28.74
100 metres hurdles (3.0 m/s)	Evelyn Mathieu (PUR)	14.71 w	Carmel Major (BAH)	14.74 w	Tanya Woodside (BAH)	15.05 w
400 metres hurdles	Evelyn Mathieu (PUR)	61.45	Carmel Major (BAH)	62.46	Rolanda Dill (BER)	63.80
High jump	Laura Agront (PUR)	1.73	Laverne Eve (BAH)	1.64	Jackeline Díaz (PUR)	1.58
Long jump	Euphemia Huggins (TRI)	6.15	Catherine Richards (BAR)	5.88	Flora Hyacinth (ISV)	5.60
Shot put	Laverne Eve (BAH)	13.95	María Isabel Urrutia (COL)	13.57	Patricia Curry (BAH)	11.69
Discus throw	María Isabel Urrutia (COL)	48.74	Laverne Eve (BAH)	43.64	Damaris Nieves (PUR)	34.72
Javelin throw	Laverne Eve (BAH)	50.64	María González (PUR)	41.58	Mayra Ortega (PUR)	41.42
Heptathlon	Nadia Katich (COL)	5220	Nélida Gómez (PUR)	4318	Mary Brito (VEN)	4200
4 × 100 metres relay	Trinidad and Tobago; Gillian Forde; Maxine McMillan; Euphemhia Huggins; Roxanne Vincent	46.78	Puerto Rico; Jenny Fuentes; Mariní Torres; Rivera; Evelyn Mathieu	47.80	Bahamas; Carmel Major; Joan Major; Tanya Woodside; Brigitte Small	48.07
4 × 400 metres relay	Trinidad and Tobago; Gillian Forde; Maxine McMillan; Euphemhia Huggins; Roxanne Vincent	3:50.85	Bahamas; Joan Major; Tanya Woodside; Brigitte Small; Cheryl Munroe	3:55.41	Puerto Rico; Evelyn Mathieu; Rivera; Suarez; Ramona Rosario	3:58.99

=== Male Junior B (under 17) ===
Event	Gold		Silver		Bronze	
100 metres (2.0 m/s)	Ricky Austin (BAR)	10.93	Eduardo Nava (MEX)	11.01	Rohan Brown (JAM)	11.12
200 metres (4.5 m/s)	Bernabé Williams (PUR)	21.99 w	Brian Benn (BAR)	22.28 w	Mark Johnson (BAH)	22.30 w
400 metres	Bernabé Williams (PUR)	49.29	Lyndale Patterson (JAM)	49.33	Anthony Wallace (JAM)	50.19
800 metres	Ramón Medero (PUR)	1:56.84	Fitzroy Morrison (JAM)	1:57.45	Nelson Taveras (DOM)	1:58.87
1500 metres	Germán Beltrán (VEN)	4:02.35	Nelson Taveras (DOM)	4:05.08	Martín Paulín (MEX)	4:07.20
3000 metres	Germán Beltrán (VEN)	8:34.0	Martín Paulín (MEX)	8:35.8	Isidro Navarro (MEX)	9:00.4
2000 metres steeplechase	Isidro Navarro (MEX)	6:18.3	Carlos de León (DOM)	6:21.6	Floyd Ambrister (BAH)	6:37.2
110 metres hurdles (3.5 m/s)	Roy Browne (BAR)	15.10 w	Gerardo Cordner (VEN)	15.14 w	José Davis (VEN)	15.29 w
400 metres hurdles	Daniel Velázquez (PUR)	54.93	José Davis (VEN)	56.63	Eduardo Marcano (VEN)	57.02
High jump	Cardinal Neely (BAH)	1.91	Hiram Valdés (PUR)	1.91	Anthony Ricketts (JAM)	1.91
Pole vault	Brent Johnson (BAH)	3.76	Darnell Ranger (BAH)	3.30	Leovigildo Díaz (DOM)	3.20
Long jump	Eduardo Nava (MEX)	7.33	Andy St. Remy (ISV)	6.83	Edward Manderson (CAY)	6.72
Triple jump	Alvin Haynes (BAR)	14.45	John Nixon (BAH)	14.03	Edward Manderson (CAY)	13.98
Shot put	Juan Rodríguez (PUR)	13.44	José Rivera (PUR)	13.22	Troy Patterson (BAR)	11.98
Discus throw	Jeffrey Marcelle (TRI)	42.12	Marcelino Vega (MEX)	36.04	Troy Patterson (BAR)	35.62
Hammer throw	José Delgado (PUR)	44.80	Joaquín Oliver (PUR)	35.32	Cedric Curry (BAH)	32.02
Javelin throw	José Rivera (PUR)	52.70	Antonio Orta (PUR)	52.52	Colin O'Brien (BAH)	50.58
Heptathlon	John Nixon (BAH)	4079	César Acevedo (PUR)	3898	Domingo Cyrus (VEN)	3716
5000 metres track walk	Aurelio Aldana (MEX)	24:01.4	Henry Mercado (PUR)	26:56.9	Walberto Marino (PUR)	29:57.0
4 × 100 metres relay	Puerto Rico; Juan Concepción; Ramón Cepero; Bernabé Williams; Soto	42.89	Bahamas; Oscar Skippings; Emile Ledee; Colin O'Brien; Timothy Clinton	43.45	United States Virgin Islands; Andy St. Remy; White; Leroy Lloyd; Stevenson	43.98
4 × 400 metres relay	Puerto Rico; Juan Concepción; Bernabé Williams; Soto; Daniel Velázquez	3:22.78	Bahamas; Mark Johnson; John Nixon; Oscar Skippings; Emile Ledee	3:27.38	United States Virgin Islands; Andy St. Remy; White; Leroy Lloyd; Stevenson	3:30.12

=== Female Junior B (under 17) ===
Event	Gold		Silver		Bronze	
100 metres (3.5 m/s)	Yolande Straughn (BAR)	11.86 w	Sheena Sturrup (BAH)	11.88 w	Marbelis Barriga (VEN)	12.32 w
200 metres (3.0 m/s)	Yolande Straughn (BAR)	24.13 w	Sheena Sturrup (BAH)	24.16 w	Diane Dunrod (SKN)	24.96 w
400 metres	Sandie Richards (JAM)	55.77	Yolande Straughn (BAR)	56.07	Christine Andoven (JAM)	57.24
800 metres	Iyiechia Petrus (ISV)	2:15.95	Judith Campbell (JAM)	2:17.36	Mariska Stubbs (BAH)	2:17.57
1200 metres	Mireille Sankaatsing (SUR)	3:38.57	Judith Campbell (JAM)	3:39.56	Alejandra Aznar (MEX)	3:40.03
100 metres hurdles (3.0 m/s)	Dianne Woodside (BAH)	15.13 w	Aitza Moreno (PUR)	15.80 w	Dawn Woodside (BAH)	15.97 w
300 metres hurdles	Kay McConney (BAR)	46.08	Judy McDonald (BAH)	46.46	Wanda Velázquez (PUR)	47.25
High jump	Jean-Marie Martine (MTQ)	1.70	Paula Burchall (BER)	1.62	Natasha Brown (BAH)	1.59
Long jump	Natasha Brown (BAH)	5.43	María Risca (MEX)	5.39	Rowan Maynard (ATG)	5.36
Shot put	Millicent McCartney (BAH)	12.07	Marie-José Alger (MTQ)	10.35	Dawn Woodside (BAH)	9.57
Discus throw	Millicent McCartney (BAH)	36.22	Betzaida Rodríguez (PUR)	35.42	Dawn Woodside (BAH)	30.38
Javelin throw	Argene Velázquez (MEX)	33.44	Dawn Woodside (BAH)	31.48	Millicent McCartney (BAH)	28.88
Pentathlon	Dianne Woodside (BAH)	2934	Irma García (MEX)	2847	Dawn Woodside (BAH)	2814
4 × 100 metres relay	Bahamas; Sheena Sturrup; Patricia Wisdom; Judy McDonald; Mariska Stubbs	48.22	Puerto Rico; Rodríguez; Rodríguez; Joyce Meléndez; Martínez	48.67	Mexico; Maricruz Prieto; Gabriela Sierra; Flores; Romary	51.38
4 × 400 metres relay	Bahamas; Sheena Sturrup; Patricia Wisdom; Judy McDonald; Mariska Stubbs	3:52.87	Puerto Rico; Isaac; Rodríguez; Vázquez; Amaro	3:58.20	Mexico; García; Gabriela Sierra; Sonia Betancourt; Claudia Samohano	4:14.63

== Medal table (unofficial) ==
* Host nation (Puerto Rico)

Rank	Nation	Gold	Silver	Bronze	Total
1	Puerto Rico*	17	27	13	57
2	Bahamas	17	15	19	51
3	Mexico	9	9	5	23
4	Jamaica	8	6	4	18
5	Barbados	7	3	6	16
6	Trinidad and Tobago	7	2	2	11
7	Venezuela	3	3	8	14
8	Colombia	3	1	2	6
9	U.S. Virgin Islands	1	1	3	5
10	Martinique	1	1	0	2
11	Antigua and Barbuda	1	0	1	2
12	Suriname	1	0	0	1
13	Bermuda	0	4	2	6
14	Dominican Republic	0	2	4	6
15	Panama	0	1	2	3
16	Cayman Islands	0	0	2	2
16	Saint Kitts and Nevis	0	0	2	2
Totals (17 entries)		75	75	75	225

== Participation (unofficial) ==
The Cayman Islands, Saint Kitts and Nevis, Suriname, and the US Virgin Islands competed for the first time at the championships. Detailed result lists can be found on the World Junior Athletics History website. An unofficial count yields a new record number of about 355 athletes (186 junior (under-20) and 169 youth (under-17)) from about 19 countries, again a new record number of participating nations:

- Antigua and Barbuda (5)
- Bahamas (44)
- Barbados (16)
- Bermuda (7)
- British Virgin Islands (1)
- Cayman Islands (5)
- Colombia (6)
- Dominican Republic (17)
- Jamaica (20)
- Martinique (4)
- (Mexico) México (59)
- Netherlands Antilles (8)
- (Panama) Panamá (9)
- Puerto Rico (101)
- Saint Kitts and Nevis (3)
- Suriname (3)
- Trinidad and Tobago (8)
- U.S. Virgin Islands (19)
- Venezuela (20)
