= 1988 CARIFTA Games =

XVII CARIFTA Games
- Dates: April 2–4
- Host city: Kingston, Jamaica
- Level: Junior and Youth
- Events: 52
- Participation: at least 117 athletes from at least 16 nations

The 17th CARIFTA Games was held in Kingston, Jamaica on April 2–4, 1988.

== Participation (unofficial) ==
For the 1988 CARIFTA Games only the medalists can be found on the "World Junior Athletics History" website. An unofficial count yields the number of about 117 medalists (67 junior (under-20) and 50 youth (under-17)) from about 16 countries: Antigua and Barbuda (1), Bahamas (17), Barbados (6), Bermuda (2), Cayman Islands (4), Guadeloupe (6), Guyana (6), Jamaica (43), Martinique (13), Montserrat (1), Netherlands Antilles (2), Saint Kitts and Nevis (1), Saint Lucia (2), Saint Vincent and the Grenadines (2), Suriname (1), Trinidad and Tobago (10).

== Austin Sealy Award ==
The Austin Sealy Trophy for the most outstanding athlete of the games was awarded to Michelle Freeman from Jamaica. She won 2 gold medals (100m, and 100m hurdles) in the junior (U-20) category. In addition, she was probably part of at least one of the medal-winning relay teams (there is no information on the team members).

== Medal summary ==
Medal winners are published by category: Boys under 20 (Junior), Girls under 20 (Junior), Boys under 17 (Youth), and Girls under 17 (Youth). The medalists can also be found on the "World Junior Athletics History" website.

=== Boys under 20 (Junior) ===
| Event | Gold | | Silver | | Bronze | |
|---|---|---|---|---|---|---|
| 100 metres | Cyrus Allen (JAM) | 10.48 | Pascal Théophile (GLP) | 10.51 | Rodrique Céryl (GLP) | 10.57 |
| 200 metres | Raymond Johnson (JAM) | 21.1 | Rodrique Céryl (GLP) | 21.4 | Winston Eddy (SKN) | 21.7 |
| 400 metres | Daniel England (JAM) | 46.62 | Barrington Campbell (JAM) | 46.70 | Christian Landre-Cornano (GLP) | 47.80 |
| 800 metres | Andrew Beecher (JAM) | 1:50.7 | Mark Jones (JAM) | 1:50.9 | Eversley Linley (VIN) | 1:51.4 |
| 1500 metres | Bernard Henry (LCA) | 4:00.19 | Mark Jones (JAM) | 4:01.29 | Eaton Evans (JAM) | 4:02.10 |
| 5000 metres | Christopher Miller (JAM) | 15:18.1 | Ronnie Holassie (TRI) | 15:19.7 | Dexter Voisin (TRI) | 15:20.5 |
| 110 metres hurdles | Stephen Golding (JAM) | 14.16 | Barrington Mighty (JAM) | 14.90 | Charles Colombes (MTQ) | 15.58 |
| 400 metres hurdles | Thomas Mason (JAM) | 53.71 | Robert Williams (JAM) | 53.94 | Craig Hepburn (BAH) | 56.73 |
| High jump | Ian Thompson (BAH) | 2.11 | Garreth Flowers (BAH) | 2.11 | Joël Vincent (MTQ) | 2.03 |
| Pole vault | Mark Godfrey (JAM) | 3.75 | Ronnie Darville (BAH) | 3.10 | | |
| Long jump | Mark Mason (GUY) | 7.78 | Germain Martial (MTQ) | 7.21 | Craig Hepburn (BAH) | 7.16 |
| Triple jump | Germain Martial (MTQ) | 16.09 | Georges Sainte-Rose (MTQ) | 15.88 | Eugene Greene (BAH) | 15.46 |
| Shot put | Linval Swaby (JAM) | 14.55 | Christian Médina (GLP) | 13.56 | Damian Edwards (TRI) | 13.45 |
| Discus throw | Linval Swaby (JAM) | 47.18 | Rufus Kemp (BAH) | 39.76 | Hervé Hauterville (MTQ) | 37.26 |
| Javelin throw | Kevin Smith (BAH) | 62.42 | Ricky Francis (TRI) | 62.04 | Kevin Brown (BAH) | 61.00 |
| 4 × 100 metres relay | Jamaica | 40.80 | Guadeloupe | 41.17 | Bahamas | 41.78 |
| 4 × 400 metres relay | Jamaica | 3:09.46 | Barbados | 3:13.98 | Trinidad and Tobago | 3:13.98 |

=== Girls under 20 (Junior) ===
| Event | Gold | | Silver | | Bronze | |
|---|---|---|---|---|---|---|
| 100 metres | Michelle Freeman (JAM) | 11.48 | Beverly McDonald (JAM) | 11.62 | Magali Simioneck (MTQ) | 12.01 |
| 200 metres | Beverly McDonald (JAM) | 23.7 | Orlene McIntosh (JAM) | 24.2 | Chandra Sturrup (BAH) | 24.6 |
| 400 metres | Sherdan Smith (JAM) | 54.16 | Jackie Hinds (BAR) | 55.47 | Alwren Wallace (JAM) | 55.83 |
| 800 metres | Lorie Ann Adams (GUY) | 2:11.47 | Mireille Sankatsing (SUR) | 2:11.88 | Ruth Hamilton (JAM) | 2:12.97 |
| 1500 metres | Lorie Ann Adams (GUY) | 4:36.67 | Barbara Stewart (JAM) | 4:42.07 | Mireille Sankatsing (SUR) | 4:42.37 |
| 3000 metres | Barbara Stewart (JAM) | 10:23.49 | Rhonda Wilson (GUY) | 10:26.96 | Mardrea Hyman (JAM) | 10:39.72 |
| 100 metres hurdles | Michelle Freeman (JAM) | 13.70 | Laure Dicot (MTQ) | 14.58 | Karen Chevalleau (JAM) | 14.75 |
| High jump | Jocelyn Evans (JAM) | 1.77 | Diane Guthrie (JAM) | 1.77 | Nicole Springer (BAR) | 1.70 |
| Long jump | Dahlia Duhaney (JAM) | 6.13 | Jacqueline Ross (VIN) | 6.13 | Dionne Rose (JAM) | 5.81 |
| Shot put | Marie-José Alger (MTQ) | 13.45 | Denise Taylor (BAH) | 13.01 | Jacqueline Ross (VIN) | 12.28 |
| Discus throw | Denise Taylor (BAH) | 43.18 | Leslie Rooks (BER) | 37.50 | Marie-José Alger (MTQ) | 35.94 |
| Javelin throw | Chantell Miller (BAH) | 42.24 | Terry-Lynn Paynter (BER) | 40.90 | Adela Paul (LCA) | 36.00 |
| 4 × 100 metres relay | Jamaica | 45.06 | Martinique | 46.38 | Bahamas | 46.80 |
| 4 × 400 metres relay | Jamaica | 3:42.72 | Bahamas | 3:53.47 | Barbados | 3:54.83 |

=== Boys under 17 (Youth) ===
| Event | Gold | | Silver | | Bronze | |
|---|---|---|---|---|---|---|
| 100 metres | Frederick Walters (JAM) | 10.71 | Eddy Bellrose (MTQ) | 10.99 | Adrian Bobb (TRI) | 11.00 |
| 200 metres | Frederick Walters (JAM) | 21.8 | Adrian Bobb (TRI) | 22.1 | Eddy Bellrose (MTQ) | 22.3 |
| 400 metres | Dane Edwards (JAM) | 49.17 | Errol Byles (JAM) | 49.52 | Hayden Stephen (TRI) | 49.71 |
| 800 metres | Kirk David (TRI) | 1:57.12 | Andy James (TRI) | 1:57.53 | Peter Merchant (ATG) | 1:57.76 |
| 1500 metres | Quinton John (TRI) | 4:02.05 | Lawrence Christie (JAM) | 4:09.46 | Robert Earle (JAM) | 4:12.50 |
| High jump | Kamari Charlton (BAH) | 1.93 | Allan Smith (BAR) | 1.93 | Noel Hall (JAM) | 1.90 |
| Long jump | Kareem Streete-Thompson (CAY) | 7.06 | Stephen Anderson (BAH) | 6.81 | Julien Frank (MSR) | 6.39 |
| Triple jump | Stephen Anderson (BAH) | 13.95 | Curtis Pride (BAH) | 13.57 | Joseph Andrew (GLP) | 13.46 |
| Shot put | Olivier Neisson (MTQ) | 13.53 | Adrian Patterson (BAR) | 13.36 | Robert Holdsworth (JAM) | 13.00 |
| Discus throw | Adrian Patterson (BAR) | 41.70 | Fidel Holder (BAR) | 38.10 | Angelo Rolle (BAH) | 37.54 |
| Javelin throw | Angelo Rolle (BAH) | 55.60 | Peterkin Berry (CAY) | 52.90 | Adrian Patterson (BAR) | 47.78 |

=== Girls under 17 (Youth) ===
| Event | Gold | | Silver | | Bronze | |
|---|---|---|---|---|---|---|
| 100 metres | Natalie Douglas (JAM) | 11.87 | Gillian Russell (JAM) | 11.90 | Christine Arron (GLP) | 12.04 |
| 200 metres | Revoli Campbell (JAM) | 23.60 | Marjorie Bailey (JAM) | 24.81 | Charmaine Clarke (GUY) | 25.43 |
| 400 metres | Revoli Campbell (JAM) | 54.59 | Inez Turner (JAM) | 54.86 | Jacqueline Sophia (AHO) | 56.42 |
| 800 metres | Inez Turner (JAM) | 2:10.00 | Karen Bennett (JAM) | 2:12.82 | Jacqueline Sophia (AHO) | 2:17.19 |
| 1500 metres | Karen Bennett (JAM) | 4:40.78 | Rhonda Wilson (GUY) | 4:46.75 | Mardrea Hyman (JAM) | 4:47.50 |
| High jump | Raquel Morrison (CAY) | 1.63 | Najuma Fletcher (GUY) | 1.63 | Icolyn Kelly (JAM) | 1.60 |
| Long jump | Debbie-Ann Parris (JAM) | 5.54 | Solange Ostiana (AHO) | 5.51 | Betty Lise (MTQ) | 5.44 |
| Shot put | Fadelma Layne (BAR) | 10.78 | Murielle Flamand (MTQ) | 9.89 | Allison Walkine (BAH) | 9.58 |
| Discus throw | Murielle Flamand (MTQ) | 31.28 | Wanda Powery (CAY) | 28.82 | Dominique Perroni (MTQ) | 28.42 |
| Javelin throw | Geraldine George (TRI) | 35.36 | Charmaine Hamilton (BAH) | 31.68 | Allison Walkine (BAH) | 29.04 |

== Medal table (unofficial) ==
* Host nation (Jamaica)

| Rank | Nation | Gold | Silver | Bronze | Total |
|---|---|---|---|---|---|
| 1 | Jamaica (JAM)* | 30 | 15 | 11 | 56 |
| 2 | Bahamas (BAH) | 7 | 8 | 10 | 25 |
| 3 | Martinique (MTQ) | 4 | 6 | 8 | 18 |
| 4 | Trinidad and Tobago (TTO) | 3 | 4 | 5 | 12 |
| 5 | Guyana (GUY) | 3 | 3 | 1 | 7 |
| 6 | Barbados (BAR) | 2 | 5 | 3 | 10 |
| 7 | Cayman Islands (CAY) | 2 | 2 | 0 | 4 |
| 8 | Saint Lucia (LCA) | 1 | 0 | 1 | 2 |
| 9 | Guadeloupe (GLP) | 0 | 4 | 4 | 8 |
| 10 | Bermuda (BER) | 0 | 2 | 0 | 2 |
| 11 | Netherlands Antilles (AHO) | 0 | 1 | 2 | 3 |
| 11 | Saint Vincent and the Grenadines (VIN) | 0 | 1 | 2 | 3 |
| 13 | Suriname (SUR) | 0 | 1 | 1 | 2 |
| 14 | Antigua and Barbuda (ATG) | 0 | 0 | 1 | 1 |
| 14 | Montserrat (MSR) | 0 | 0 | 1 | 1 |
| 14 | Saint Kitts and Nevis (SKN) | 0 | 0 | 1 | 1 |
| Totals (16 entries) | | 52 | 52 | 51 | 155 |
