= 1986 CARIFTA Games =

XV CARIFTA Games
- Dates: March 29–31
- Host city: Les Abymes, Guadeloupe
- Level: Junior and Youth
- Events: 52
- Participation: at least 111 athletes from at least 14 nations

The 15th CARIFTA Games was held in Les Abymes, Guadeloupe on March 29–31, 1986.

== Participation (unofficial) ==
For the 1986 CARIFTA Games only the medalists can be found on the "World Junior Athletics History" website. An unofficial count yields the number of about 111 medalists (64 junior (under-20) and 47 youth (under-17)) from about 14 countries: Antigua and Barbuda (1), Bahamas (26), Barbados (11), Bermuda (5), Cayman Islands (2), French Guiana (1), Grenada (2), Guadeloupe (11), Jamaica (32), Martinique (7), Saint Kitts and Nevis (2), Saint Lucia (2), Suriname (1), Trinidad and Tobago (8).

== Austin Sealy Award ==
The Austin Sealy Trophy for the most outstanding athlete of the games was awarded to Pascal Théophile from Guadeloupe. He won 2 gold medals (100m, and 200m) in the youth (U-17) category.

== Medal summary ==
Medal winners are published by category: Boys under 20 (Junior), Girls under 20 (Junior), Boys under 17 (Youth), and Girls under 17 (Youth). The medalists can also be found on the "World Junior Athletics History" website.

=== Boys under 20 (Junior) ===
Event	Gold		Silver		Bronze	
100 metres	Dazel Jules (TRI)	10.51w	Michael Newbold (BAH)	10.55w	Garfield Campbell (JAM)	10.76w
200 metres (1.6 m/s)	Michael Newbold (BAH)	20.78	Dazel Jules (TRI)	20.87	Mark Johnson (BAH)	21.14
400 metres	Howard Davis (JAM)	47.65	Carey Johnson (JAM)	48.01	Seibert Straughn (BAR)	48.20
800 metres	Anthony Christie (JAM)	1:52.20	Gosham Springer (GRN)	1:52.78	Nicholas de Verteuil (TRI)	1:53.01
1500 metres	Anthony Christie (JAM)	3:57.92	Gosham Springer (GRN)	3:57.97	Sean Joseph (TRI)	3:58.89
5000 metres	Sherwin Burgess (JAM)	15:34.24	Anthony Johnson (JAM)	15:35.91	Mark Thorne (BAR)	15:48.21
110 metres hurdles	Andrew Smith (BAH)	14.46	Roy Browne (BAR)	14.78	Frantz Feuillard (GLP)	14.86
400 metres hurdles	Allan Ince (BAR)	53.67	Jean-Claude Cajazzo (GLP)	54.92	Roy Browne (BAR)	56.10
High jump	Joël Vincent (MTQ)	2.19	Guy Labylle (GLP)	2.19	Dayan Stewart (JAM)	2.01
Pole vault	Jean Vanderpool (BAH)	3.66	Brent Johnson (BAH)	3.50	David Simon (ATG)	2.80
Long jump	Alex Hendrickson (SKN)	7.28	Edward Manderson (CAY)	7.24	Jeffrey Neptune (GRN)	7.22
Triple jump	Brian Wellman (BER)	15.87w	Edward Manderson (CAY)	15.86w	Dwight Mitchell (JAM)	15.54w
Shot put	Troy Patterson (BAR)	13.82	Rohan Webb (JAM)	13.71	Florent Ceylan (MTQ)	13.59
Discus throw	Michael Hill (JAM)	48.52	Adam Llewelyn (CAY)	41.48	Troy Patterson (BAR)	40.75
Javelin throw	André Davidson (BAR)	64.58	Jean-René Ceylan (MTQ)	57.78	Kirt Thompson (TRI)	56.40
4 × 100 metres relay	Bahamas	41.35	Saint Kitts and Nevis	42.39	Suriname	45.75
4 × 400 metres relay	Jamaica	3:10.63	Barbados	3:14.92	Trinidad and Tobago	3:17.34

=== Girls under 20 (Junior) ===
Event	Gold		Silver		Bronze	
100 metres (0.4 m/s)	Gillian Forde (TRI)	11.45	Sheena Sturrup (BAH)	11.86	Laurel Johnson (JAM)	11.97
200 metres (1.3 m/s)	Gillian Forde (TRI)	23.14	Sandie Richards (JAM)	23.66	Laurel Johnson (JAM)	23.82
400 metres	Sandie Richards (JAM)	52.18	Andrea Thomas (JAM)	53.10	Diane Dunrod (SKN)	54.85
800 metres	Andrea Thomas (JAM)	2:10.68	Sylvia Thomas (Jamaican athlete) (JAM)	2:16.46	Mireille Sankatsing (SUR)	2:17.82
1500 metres	Ruth Hamilton (JAM)	4:50.21	Mireille Sankatsing (SUR)	4:53.09	Rochelle McKenzie (BAH)	4:54.04
3000 metres	Barbara Stewart (JAM)	10:26.68	Ruth Hamilton (JAM)	10:32.85	Rochelle McKenzie (BAH)	10:44.56
100 metres hurdles	Sophia Brown (JAM)	14.30	Dianne Woodside (BAH)	14.64	Francine Landre (GLP)	15.99
High jump	Nicole Springer (BAR)	1.75	Judy McDonald (BAH)	1.72	Marge Biabiany (GLP)	1.72
Long jump	Natasha Brown (BAH)	5.64	Edna Mae Tuzo (BER)	5.60	Twilet Malcolm (JAM)	5.59
Shot put	Marie-José Alger (MTQ)	12.86	Millicent McCartney (BAH)	12.52	France-Aimée Coquin (GLP)	11.75
Discus throw	Dawn Woodside (BAH)	41.76	Millicent McCartney (BAH)	38.64	Janice Daley (JAM)	36.26
Javelin throw	Dawn Woodside (BAH)	41.64	Millicent McCartney (BAH)	34.82	Sharon Evelyn (BAR)	34.62
4 × 100 metres relay	Jamaica	45.90	Trinidad and Tobago	46.04	Bahamas	46.72
4 × 400 metres relay	Jamaica	3:43.52	Bahamas	3:53.21	Saint Kitts and Nevis	3:54.82

=== Boys under 17 (Youth) ===
Event	Gold		Silver		Bronze	
100 metres (1.8 m/s)	Pascal Théophile (GLP)	10.76	Kevin Moore (JAM)	10.92	Timothy Clinton (BAH)	11.09
200 metres	Pascal Théophile (GLP)	21.84	Kevin Moore (JAM)	22.05	Timothy Clinton (BAH)	22.38
400 metres	Barrington Campbell (JAM)	47.98	Paul Campbell (JAM)	50.41	Renward Wells (BAH)	51.19
800 metres	Maurice Davis (JAM)	1:57.68	Sherman Kelly (TRI)	1:58.42	Raphael Roett (BAR)	1:58.87
1500 metres	Maurice Davis (JAM)	4:09.43	Ricardo Pratt (BAH)	4:15.18	Sherman Kelly (TRI)	4:16.35
High jump	Emile Ledee (BAH)	1.86	Garreth Flowers (BAH)	1.83	Jerome Robinson (BER)	1.75
Long jump	Emile Ledee (BAH)	6.73	Windell Dobson (JAM)	6.64	Jean-Luc Poussin (MTQ)	6.47
Triple jump	Steven Curtis (BAH)	13.55	Emile Ledee (BAH)	13.50	Charles Tabord (GLP)	13.43
Shot put	Hervé Hauterville (MTQ)	13.79	Andrew Griffith (BAR)	13.78	Linval Swaby (JAM)	13.62
Discus throw	Linval Swaby (JAM)	48.86	Kevin Smith (BAH)	37.50	Andrew Griffith (BAR)	36.04
Javelin throw	Steeve Malespine (GLP)	56.92	Kevin Brown (BAH)	50.60	Maxwell Seals (LCA)	47.94

=== Girls under 17 (Youth) ===
Event	Gold		Silver		Bronze	
100 metres (0.8 m/s)	Beverly McDonald (JAM)	11.85	Magali Simioneck (MTQ)	12.06	Cheryl-Ann Phillips (JAM)	12.11
200 metres (-2.4 m/s)	Beverly McDonald (JAM)	23.90	Cheryl-Ann Phillips (JAM)	24.26	Francine Landre (GLP)	24.29
400 metres	Kyron Agard (TRI)	56.47	Sandra Boothe (JAM)	57.62	Claudette Farade (GUF)	58.00
800 metres	Karen Bennett (JAM)	2:12.48	Mariska Stubbs (BAH)	2:14.68	Sandra Boothe (JAM)	2:15.60
1500 metres	Karen Bennett (JAM)	4:46.39	Barbara Stewart (JAM)	4:49.30	Marlene Cyrus (BAR)	4:55.52
High jump	Michelle Alleyne (TRI)	1.68	Diane Guthrie (JAM)	1.58	Zur Samuels (BER)	1.58
Long jump	Jackie Edwards (BAH)	5.76	Dahlia Duhaney (JAM)	5.43	Diane Guthrie (JAM)	5.39
Shot put	Denise Taylor (BAH)	11.57	Leslie Rooks (BER)	11.46	Sylviane Perrot (GLP)	11.03
Discus throw	Denise Taylor (BAH)	39.74	Leslie Rooks (BER)	38.02	Lafrance Williams (BAH)	31.62
Javelin throw	Chantell Miller (BAH)	37.00	Anya Smith (BAH)	35.60	Adela Paul (LCA)	25.96

== Medal table (unofficial) ==
* Host nation (Guadeloupe)

Rank	Nation	Gold	Silver	Bronze	Total
1	Jamaica (JAM)	21	16	11	48
2	Bahamas (BAH)	14	16	8	38
3	Trinidad and Tobago (TTO)	5	3	5	13
4	Barbados (BAR)	4	3	8	15
5	Guadeloupe (GLP)*	3	2	7	12
6	Martinique (MTQ)	3	2	2	7
7	Bermuda (BER)	1	3	2	6
8	Saint Kitts and Nevis (SKN)	1	1	2	4
9	Cayman Islands (CAY)	0	3	0	3
10	Grenada (GRN)	0	2	1	3
11	Suriname (SUR)	0	1	2	3
12	Saint Lucia (LCA)	0	0	2	2
13	Antigua and Barbuda (ATG)	0	0	1	1
13	French Guiana (GUF)	0	0	1	1
Totals (14 entries)		52	52	52	156
