= Greg Meghoo =

Jamaican sprinter (born 1965)

Personal information
- Born: 11 August 1965 (age 61)
Medal record
Men's Athletics
Representing Jamaica
Olympic Games
| Silver medal – second place | 1984 Los Angeles | 4x100m Relay |
CARIFTA Games Junior (U20)
| Gold medal – first place | 1982 Kingston | 4x100m Relay |
| Gold medal – first place | 1984 Nassau | 200m |
| Silver medal – second place | 1984 Nassau | 100m |

Gregory Meghoo (born 11 August 1965 in Ewarton, Saint Catherine) is a former Jamaican athlete who mainly competed in the 100 metres.

He competed for Jamaica at the 1984 Summer Olympics held in Los Angeles, United States where he won the silver medal in the men's 4x100 metre relay event with his teammates Al Lawrence, Don Quarrie and Ray Stewart.

Meghoo successfully representeded St. Jago High School at the annual Boys Championships in Jamaica. He was a teammate of Bert Cameron as well as Rudolph Briscoe, who competed in the 400 and 800 meters as well. Meghoo's older brother Robert Meghoo competed in the 100 meters but never made it to the Olympics. Another teammate in high school was 10,000 meter Jamaican national record holder Mark "Yifter" Elliott, who now coaches in the USA.

Greg Meghoo is now a United States Citizen, served in the U.S. Army, and is now in the U.S. Air Force Reserves. Greg Meghoo has earned numerous awards in the Army earning Army achiement medals, and Army Commendation awards and well as several awards in the Air Force Reserve for outstanding non-commissioned officer and Meritorious service. Greg Meghoo is also a Fitness buff, who like to take the time to exercise and help others stay in shape.
