= Don Burke (disambiguation) =

Don Burke (born 1947) is an Australian television presenter and horticulturist.

Don Burke or Donald Burke may also refer to:

- Donald Burke, American infectious diseases researcher
- Don Burke (American football) (born 1926), American football player
