= Francine Landre =

French sprinter

Medal record

Women's athletics

Representing France

European Championships
Gold medal – first place	1994 Helsinki	4×400 m

Representing Guadeloupe

CARIFTA Games (Junior)
Bronze medal – third place	1986 Les Abymes	100 m hurdles

CARIFTA Games (Youth)
Gold medal – first place	1985 Bridgetown	400 m
Bronze medal – third place	1986 Les Abymes	200 m

Francine Landre (born 26 July 1970 in Les Abymes, Guadeloupe) is a French athlete who specialises in the 400 meters. Landre competed in the women's 4 × 400 meter relay at the 1996 Summer Olympics.
