= Athletics at the 1990 Commonwealth Games – Women's long jump =

Women's long jump at the Commonwealth Games

The women's long jump event at the 1990 Commonwealth Games was held on 2 February at the Mount Smart Stadium in Auckland.

== Results ==
=== Final ===
Rank	Name	Nationality	#1	#2	#3	#4	#5	#6	Result	Notes
1st place, gold medalist(s)	Jane Flemming	Australia	x	6.26	6.45	6.63	?	6.78	6.78	
2nd place, silver medalist(s)	Beatrice Utondu	Nigeria	6.37	6.56	6.45	6.34	x	6.65w	6.65w	
3rd place, bronze medalist(s)	Fiona May	England	x	6.44	6.49	6.53	6.55	6.54	6.55	
4	Chioma Ajunwa	Nigeria							6.48	
5	Jayne Moffitt	New Zealand							6.46	
6	Shonel Ferguson	Bahamas	6.37	x	5.83	x	?	?	6.41w	
7	Mary Berkeley	England							6.33w	
8	Sandra Priestley	Australia							6.32	
9	Kim Hagger	England							6.27	
10	Sharon Jaklofsky	Australia							6.25w	
11	Lisa Ball	New Zealand							6.21w	
12	Euphemia Huggins	Trinidad and Tobago							6.19	
13	Donna Smellie	Canada							5.73	
