= 1988 Central American and Caribbean Junior Championships in Athletics =

VIII Central American and Caribbean Junior Championships
- Dates: 30 June-2 July
- Host city: Nassau, Bahamas (The Bahamas)
- Level: Junior and Youth
- Events: 74 (39 junior, 35 youth)
- Participation: about 223 (125 junior, 98 youth) athletes from 13 nations

The 8th Central American and Caribbean Junior Championships was held in Nassau, Bahamas, between 30 June-2 July 1988.

== Medal summary ==
Medal winners are published by category: Junior A, Male, Junior A, Female, and Junior B. Complete results can be found on the World Junior Athletics History website.

=== Male Junior A (under 20) ===
Event	Gold		Silver		Bronze	
100 metres (-0.2 m/s)	Dennis Mowatt (JAM)	10.83	Timothy Clinton (BAH)	10.87	Ramón Cepero (PUR)	11.00
200 metres (0.0 m/s)	Dennis Mowatt (JAM)	21.72	Leonardo Prevost (CUB)	21.95	Luis Hinestrosa (MEX)	22.05
400 metres	Pedro Cañete (CUB)	46.9	Luis Cadogan (CUB)	47.8	Sylvanus Hepburn (BAH)	48.3
800 metres	Luis Cadogan (CUB)	1:52.56	Pedro Cañete (CUB)	1:53.31	Desmond Dorsett (BAH)	1:55.64
1500 metres	Nelson de la Cruz (CUB)	4:00.32	Luis Guerra (CUB)	4:00.84	José Cintrón (PUR)	4:04.38
5000 metres	Julián Pérez (CUB)	15:02.42	Nelson de la Cruz (CUB)	15:05.80	Alejandro Villanueva (MEX)	15:11.78
10,000 metres	Alejandro Villanueva (MEX)	31:18.25	Julián Pérez (CUB)	32:06.60	Chris Adams (ISV)	39:49.85
Half Marathon	Julián Pérez (CUB)	1:09:20	Francisco Terry (CUB)	1:10:09	Byron Salome (AHO)	1:25:38
3000 metres steeplechase	Nelson de la Cruz (CUB)	9:29.79	Desmond Dorsett (BAH)	10:16.05		
110 metres hurdles (0.2 m/s)	Omar Portuondo (CUB)	14.50	Alexis Sánchez (CUB)	14.62	Roberto Carmona (MEX)	14.80
400 metres hurdles	Javier Paumier (CUB)	52.65	Omar Portuondo (CUB)	52.79	Winston Chambers (JAM)	53.50
High jump	Ian Thompson (BAH)	2.05	Garreth Flowers (BAH)	2.03	Jorge Martínez (MEX)	2.00
Pole vault	Adrian Knowles (BAH)	4.10	Anthony Sweeting (BAH)	3.70	Raúl Díaz (PUR)	3.30
Long jump	Craig Hepburn (BAH)	7.18	John Edwards (BAH)	7.02	Luis Vallín (MEX)	7.01
Triple jump	Eugene Greene (BAH)	16.13	Juan Carlos Ibáñez (CUB)	15.63	Burlington Moss (BAH)	15.14
Shot put	Carlos Fandiño (CUB)	17.04	Linval Swaby (JAM)	13.91	Pedro Acosta (CUB)	13.71
Discus throw	Pedro Acosta (CUB)	54.08	Linval Swaby (JAM)	48.25	Carlos Fandiño (CUB)	47.57
Hammer throw	Ismael López (CUB)	55.03	Santos Vega (PUR)	49.26	Reinaldo Santos (PUR)	48.54
Javelin throw	Kevin Brown (BAH)	62.02	Kevin Smith (BAH)	61.08		
Decathlon	Henry Valdivia (CUB)	6443	Reynaldo Marino (CUB)	5912	Kevin Smith (BAH)	5173
10,000 metres track walk	Alberto Cruz (MEX)	46:05	Ignacio Zamudio (MEX)	46:41	Javier Cotto (PUR)	48:56
4 × 100 metres relay	Jamaica; Winston Chambers; Windell Dobson; Gooding; Dennis Mowatt	41.39	Puerto Rico; Carlos Santiago; Félix Ramos; Carlos Dávila; Ramón Cepero	41.81	Cuba; Omar Portuondo; Alexis Sánchez; Leonardo Prevost; Pedro Cañete	41.99
4 × 400 metres relay	Cuba	3:09.46	Bahamas	3:18.29	Mexico	3:20.19

=== Female Junior A (under 20) ===
Event	Gold		Silver		Bronze	
100 metres	Chandra Sturrup (BAH)	11.96	Orlene McIntosh (JAM)	12.03	Cheryl-Ann Phillips (JAM)	12.15
200 metres (-0.3 m/s)	Orlene McIntosh (JAM)	23.91	Chandra Sturrup (BAH)	24.27	Cheryl-Ann Phillips (JAM)	24.56
400 metres	Nancy McLeón (CUB)	54.22	Mayelín Lemus (CUB)	54.89	Barbara Selkridge (ATG)	55.43
800 metres	Sonia Escalera (PUR)	2:13.03	Mayelín Lemus (CUB)	2:15.80	Theresa Thomas (ATG)	2:18.55
1500 metres	Maricarmen Díaz (MEX)	4:36.37	Rosita Ocasio (PUR)	4:43.85	Narda Williams (ATG)	4:59.53
3000 metres	Maricarmen Díaz (MEX)	10:06.8	Rosita Ocasio (PUR)	10:17.3	Kayla Greene (BAH)	10:53.3
100 metres hurdles	Milagros Echevarría (CUB)	14.22	Natasha Brown (BAH)	14.41	Lucila Carmona (MEX)	15.05
400 metres hurdles	Milagros Echevarría (CUB)	61.87	Lency Montelier (CUB)	63.58	Joyce Meléndez (PUR)	64.71
High jump	Yamilé Aldama (CUB)	1.78	Ioamnet Quintero (CUB)	1.78	Mayra Medina (PUR)	1.65
Long jump	Jackie Edwards (BAH)	6.20	Natasha Brown (BAH)	6.13	Cheryl-Ann Phillips (JAM)	5.68
Shot put	Marlene Palacios (CUB)	14.57	Jacqueline Díaz (CUB)	14.55	Denise Taylor (BAH)	13.05
Discus throw	Margarita Lugo (CUB)	48.06	Maricela Bristel (CUB)	46.35	Denise Taylor (BAH)	42.89
Javelin throw	Bárbara Hernández (CUB)	46.66	Terry-Lynn Paynter (BER)	43.27	María Rodríguez (CUB)	43.24
Heptathlon	Yolanda Pompa (CUB)	4654	María Rodríguez (CUB)	4609	Mariska Stubbs (BAH)	4348
4 × 100 metres relay	Cuba; Arani Palacios; Milagros Echeverría; Julia Duporty; Tellami Martínez	46.76	Bahamas; Pauline Griffith; Chandra Sturrup; Natasha Brown; Jackie Edwards	46.77	Puerto Rico; Dagmar Delbrey; Mirna Rodríguez; Joyce Meléndez; Dagmar Rosado	48.08
4 × 400 metres relay	Cuba	3:42.37	Puerto Rico	3:54.12	Antigua and Barbuda	3:56.63

=== Male Junior B (under 17) ===
Event	Gold		Silver		Bronze	
100 metres (0.3 m/s)	Carlos Santos (PUR)	11.00	Edgar Chourio (VEN)	11.13	Agner Muñoz (PUR)	11.14
200 metres (0.3 m/s)	José Hernández (PUR)	22.14	Edgar Chourio (VEN)	22.32	Carlos Santos (PUR)	22.37
400 metres	José Hernández (PUR)	48.64	Kirk David (TRI)	49.56	Peter Merchant (ATG)	49.94
800 metres	Kirk David (TRI)	1:56.34	Ramón Arriaga (PUR)	1:56.38	Peter Merchant (ATG)	1:59.99
1500 metres	Ramón Arriaga (PUR)	4:01.90	Quintin John (TRI)	4:03.70	Daniel Dabbah (MEX)	4:07.23
3000 metres	Daniel Dabbah (MEX)	8:47.82	José Uribe I (MEX)	8:49.98	Eduardo Wiwall (PUR)	9:03.45
2000 metres steeplechase	Antonio Ortíz (PUR)	6:31.80	Néstor Nieves (VEN)	6:34.04	Luis Yáñez (VEN)	6:35.95
110 metres hurdles	Luis Guerra (VEN)	14.92	Oscar Lara (MEX)	15.04	Javier Rivera (PUR)	15.72
400 metres hurdles	Javier Rivera (PUR)	56.11	Lynden Hepburn (BAH)	56.29	Alexander Manrique (VEN)	57.26
High jump	Kamari Charlton (BAH)	1.82	Henry Rolle (BAH)	1.82	Miguel Ochoa (VEN)	1.79
Pole vault	Ronnie Darville (BAH)	3.30	Randy Perpall (BAH)	3.10		
Long jump	Drumico Lauriston (BAH)	6.93	Stephen Anderson (BAH)	6.77	Fermín Peña (VEN)	6.10
Triple jump	Curtis Pride (BAH)	13.83	Stephen Anderson (BAH)	13.83	Fermín Peña (VEN)	12.73
Shot put	Yojer Medina (VEN)	14.55	Alfredo Romero (PUR)	14.47	Kamari Charlton (BAH)	12.35
Discus throw	Yojer Medina (VEN)	43.08	Kamari Charlton (BAH)	37.97	Francisco Lezarraga (MEX)	37.57
Javelin throw	Angelo Rolle (BAH)	57.22	Yojer Medina (VEN)	56.52	Juan Manuel López (MEX)	55.55
Heptathlon	Kamari Charlton (BAH)	3932	Ronnie Darville (BAH)	3576		
5000 metres track walk	Rubén López (VEN)	24:47.3	Juan Colón (PUR)	27:20.9		
4 × 100 metres relay	Puerto Rico; Carlos Santos; Agner Muñoz; Javier Rivera; José Hernández	42.37	Venezuela; Cepeda; Edwin Cruzate; Luis Guerra; Edgar Chourio	42.99		
4 × 400 metres relay	Puerto Rico; Javier Rivera; Carlos Santos; Santiago; José Hernández	3:22.54	Bahamas; Stephen Anderson; Melvon Duncanson; Lynden Hepburn; Marcus Knowles	3:27.42	Venezuela; Cepeda; Jesús Ochoa; Alexander Manrique; Alexander González	3:33.19

=== Female Junior B (under 17) ===
Event	Gold		Silver		Bronze	
100 metres (-0.2 m/s)	Gillian Russell (JAM)	12.04	Tellami Martínez (CUB)	12.40	Valeska Browne (BAH)	12.50
200 metres (-0.2 m/s)	Revoli Campbell (JAM)	24.20	Jacqueline Sophia (AHO)	25.04	Tellami Martínez (CUB)	25.56
400 metres	Revoli Campbell (JAM)	55.56	Jacqueline Sophia (AHO)	55.87	Nailet González (VEN)	58.88
800 metres	Elizabeth Labrador (VEN)	2:19.11	Sasha Durán (PUR)	2:21.6	Latoya Bain (BAH)	2:22.2
1200 metres	Elizabeth Labrador (VEN)	3:42.61	María Luz Villanueva (MEX)	3:46.14	Sasha Durán (PUR)	3:47.62
100 metres hurdles (-0.2 m/s)	Gillian Russell (JAM)	14.64	Maríana Carmona (MEX)	15.35	Lisolet Ling (VEN)	15.51
300 metres hurdles	Carmen Britapaz (VEN)	47.7	Maríana Carmona (MEX)	47.9	Arniece McPhee (BAH)	50.1
High jump	Fadelma Layne (BAR)	1.63	Raquel Morrison (CAY)	1.60	Dorinda Taylor (BAH)	1.40
Long jump	Solange Ostiana (AHO)	5.67	Ida de Jesús (PUR)	5.35	Raquel Morrison (CAY)	5.34
Shot put	Hannelly Villalba (VEN)	10.58	Fadelma Layne (BAR)	10.10	Allison Walkine (BAH)	10.07
Discus throw	Riget Marie (VEN)	37.32	Brenda Oquendo (PUR)	32.56	Wanda Powery (CAY)	31.90
Javelin throw	Riget Marie (VEN)	36.50	Geraldine George (TRI)	32.00	Allison Walkine (BAH)	30.46
Pentathlon	Arniece McPhee (BAH)	2237	Tamara Malcolm (BAH)	2168		
4 × 100 metres relay	Jamaica; Gillian Russell; Revoli Campbell; Merlene Frazer; Natalie Douglas	46.75	Puerto Rico; Laura de Jesús; Jessica de la Cruz; Elaine Torres; Torres	49.25		
4 × 400 metres relay	Bahamas	3:59.36	Puerto Rico	4:04.69	Venezuela	4:06.8

== Medal table (unofficial) ==
* Host nation (Bahamas)

Rank	Nation	Gold	Silver	Bronze	Total
1	Cuba (CUB)	23	19	5	47
2	Bahamas (BAH)*	15	20	15	50
3	Venezuela (VEN)	10	5	9	24
4	Puerto Rico (PUR)	9	13	13	35
5	Jamaica (JAM)	9	3	4	16
6	Mexico (MEX)	5	6	10	21
7	Trinidad and Tobago (TTO)	1	3	0	4
8	Netherlands Antilles (AHO)	1	2	1	4
9	Barbados (BAR)	1	1	0	2
10	Cayman Islands (CAY)	0	1	2	3
11	Bermuda (BER)	0	1	0	1
12	Antigua and Barbuda (ATG)	0	0	6	6
13	U.S. Virgin Islands (VIR)	0	0	1	1
Totals (13 entries)		74	74	66	214

== Participation (unofficial) ==
Detailed result lists can be found on the World Junior Athletics History website. An unofficial count yields a number of about 223 athletes (125 junior (under-20) and 98 youth (under-17)) from about 13 countries:

- Antigua and Barbuda (5)
- Bahamas (59)
- Barbados (2)
- Bermuda (3)
- Cayman Islands (3)
- Cuba (35)
- Jamaica (13)
- (Mexico) México (23)
- Netherlands Antilles (5)
- Puerto Rico (41)
- Trinidad and Tobago (3)
- U.S. Virgin Islands (9)
- Venezuela (22)
