= Mark Mason (athlete) =

Guyanese long jumper

Medal record

Men's athletics

Representing Guyana

CARIFTA Games Junior (U20)
Gold medal – first place	1988 Kingston	Long Jump
Bronze medal – third place	1987 Port of Spain	Long Jump

CARIFTA Games Youth (U17)
Gold medal – first place	1985 Bridgetown	Long Jump

Mark Mason (born 6 June 1969) is a retired Guyanese long jumper.

He competed at the 1992 Olympic Games, but without reaching the final.

His personal best jump was 8.07 metres, achieved in April 1993 in Raleigh.
