= Andrew Parker (hurdler) =

Jamaican track and field athlete (born 1965)

Medal record

Men's athletics

Representing Jamaica

Pan American Games
Gold medal – first place	1987 Indianapolis	110 m hurdles

CAC Championships
Silver medal – second place	1989 San Juan	110 m hurdles

CAC Junior Championships (U20)
Gold medal – first place	1984 San Juan	110 m hurdles
Gold medal – first place	1984 San Juan	400 m hurdles
Gold medal – first place	1984 San Juan	4x100 m relay

CARIFTA Games Junior (U20)
Gold medal – first place	1983 Fort-de-France	110m hurdles

Andrew Parker (born 11 January 1965) is a Jamaican track and field athlete who competed in the 110 metres hurdles. He won the event at the 1987 Pan American Games and represented Jamaica at the 1988 Summer Olympics as well as the 1987 World Championships in Athletics.

== Career ==
His first international medal came at the 1983 CARIFTA Games, where he was the gold medallist in the high hurdles. A 110 m and 400 metres hurdles double followed at the 1984 Central American and Caribbean Junior Championships in Athletics held in San Juan, Puerto Rico.

He studied at Arizona State University in the United States and competed collegiately for them as part of the Arizona State Sun Devils track and field team. He won the hurdles title twice consecutively at the Pac-10 Conference meet from 1986 to 1987. He also received three All-America honours in NCAA competition: twice in the 55 metres hurdles (1985, 1986) and once over the 110 m hurdles (1987).

Parker was selected to represent Jamaica in the 110 m hurdles at the 1987 Pan American Games in Indianapolis. American Greg Foster was the reigning world champion and the favourite for the event. However, his team mate Cletus Clark fell mid-race and as a result a hurdle flew into Foster's path, throwing him off balance. Parker took advantage of the mellee between his two main competitors and sped away to claim the Pan American gold medal. Later that month, Parker headed to the 1987 World Championships in Athletics in Rome. He was eliminated in the first round, while his Pan American rival Foster retained the world title.

A year later, Parker made his Olympic debut at the age of 23 and reached the hurdles quarter-finals at the 1988 Seoul Olympics. His final international medal came at the 1989 Central American and Caribbean Championships in Athletics where he was the silver medallist behind Cuba's Emilio Valle, who ran a championship record.

== Achievements ==
Year	Competition	Venue	Position	Event	Notes
Representing Jamaica
1983	CARIFTA Games (U-20)	Fort-de-France, Martinique	1st	110 m hurdles	14.4
1984	Central American and Caribbean Junior Championships (U-20)	San Juan, Puerto Rico	1st	110 m hurdles	14.19 w (3.5 m/s)
1984	Central American and Caribbean Junior Championships (U-20)	San Juan, Puerto Rico	1st	400 m hurdles	53.33
1984	Central American and Caribbean Junior Championships (U-20)	San Juan, Puerto Rico	1st	4 × 100 m relay	41.02
1987	World Championships	Rome, Italy	5th (h)	110 m hurdles	13.94
1988	Olympic Games	Seoul, South Korea	6th (h)	110 m hurdles	14.05
