= Euphemia Huggins =

Trinidad and Tobago long jumper

Personal information
- Born: 24 February 1965 (age 61) Williamsville, Trinidad and Tobago

Sport
- Sport: Track and field
Medal record
Representing Trinidad and Tobago
Central American and Caribbean Games
Bronze medal – third place	1990 Mexico City	Long jump

Euphemia Huggins (born 24 February 1965) is a Trinidad and Tobago long jumper and netball player.

She hails from Williamsville. In age-specific competitions, she won silver medals at the 1983 and 1984 CARIFTA Games as well as the gold medal at the 1984 Central American and Caribbean Junior Championships. She went on to win the silver medal at the 1989 Central American and Caribbean Championships and the bronze medal at the 1990 Central American and Caribbean Games, finished twelfth at the 1990 Commonwealth Games and sixth at the 1991 Pan American Games. She also competed at the 1987 World Championships without reaching the final.

Huggins also played netball for Trotters, Lakers and Police. For her exploits in track events and netball, Huggins won the Sportswoman of the Year award at the 1989 West Indian Tobacco Company Sports Awards.

She is the mother of cyclists Teniel Campbell and Akil Campbell.
