= Laverne Eve =

Bahamian javelin thrower

Personal information
- Born: 16 June 1965 (age 61) Nassau, Bahamas

Sport
- Sport: Track and field
Medal record
Representing Bahamas
Pan American Games
Silver medal – second place	1995 Mar de Plata	Javelin
Bronze medal – third place	1999 Winnipeg	Javelin
Silver medal – second place	2003 Santo Domingo	Javelin
Bronze medal – third place	2007 Rio de Janeiro	Javelin
Commonwealth Games
Gold medal – first place	2002 Manchester	Javelin
Silver medal – second place	2006 Melbourne	Javelin

Laverne Eve (born 16 June 1965) is a female track and field athlete from the Bahamas, who competes in the javelin throw. Her personal best throw (new javelin) is 63.73 metres, achieved in April 2000 in Nashville. In her early career she also competed in shot put and discus throw. 30 years after starting her career, she still throws at a high level.

Eve was a member of the Louisiana State University track and field team.

In 1982 and in 1983, she was awarded the Austin Sealy Trophy for the most outstanding athlete both of the 1982 CARIFTA Games and 1983 CARIFTA Games. She was the first athlete to gain the trophy for the second time.

== International competitions ==
Year	Competition	Venue	Position	Event	Notes
Representing the Bahamas
1980	Central American and Caribbean; Junior Championships (U-17)	Nassau, Bahamas	2nd	Shot	12.25m
1980	Central American and Caribbean; Junior Championships (U-17)	Nassau, Bahamas	1st	Discus	35.16m
1981	CARIFTA Games (U-17)	Nassau, Bahamas	1st	Shot	13.27m
1981	CARIFTA Games (U-17)	Nassau, Bahamas	1st	Javelin	39.94m
1981	Central American and Caribbean Championships	Santo Domingo, Dom. Rep.	3rd	Shot	13.32 m
1981	Central American and Caribbean Championships	Santo Domingo, Dom. Rep.	3rd	Discus	42.56 m
1982	CARIFTA Games (U-20)	Kingston, Jamaica	1st	Shot	13.66 m
1982	CARIFTA Games (U-20)	Kingston, Jamaica	1st	Discus	39.60 m
1982	CARIFTA Games (U-20)	Kingston, Jamaica	1st	Javelin	48.62 m
1982	Central American and Caribbean; Junior Championships (U-20)	Bridgetown, Barbados	3rd	Shot	13.26 m
1982	Central American and Caribbean; Junior Championships (U-20)	Bridgetown, Barbados	4th	Discus	39.46 m
1982	Central American and Caribbean; Junior Championships (U-20)	Bridgetown, Barbados	4th	Javelin	44.44 m
1982	Central American and Caribbean Games	Havana, Cuba	4th	Shot	13.48 m
1982	Central American and Caribbean Games	Havana, Cuba	4th	Discus	45.26 m
1982	Central American and Caribbean Games	Havana, Cuba	6th	Javelin	47.74 m
1983	CARIFTA Games (U-20)	Fort-de-France, Martinique	1st	Shot	14.39 m
1983	CARIFTA Games (U-20)	Fort-de-France, Martinique	1st	Discus	42.90 m
1983	CARIFTA Games (U-20)	Fort-de-France, Martinique	1st	Javelin	47.32 m
1983	Central American and Caribbean Championships	Havana, Cuba	2nd	Shot	14.75 m
1984	CARIFTA Games (U-20)	Nassau, Bahamas	1st	Shot	14.66 m
1984	CARIFTA Games (U-20)	Nassau, Bahamas	1st	Discus	46.40 m
1984	CARIFTA Games (U-20)	Nassau, Bahamas	1st	Javelin	50.14 m
1984	Central American and Caribbean; Junior Championships (U-20)	San Juan, Puerto Rico	2nd	High jump	1.64 m
1984	Central American and Caribbean; Junior Championships (U-20)	San Juan, Puerto Rico	1st	Shot	13.95 m
1984	Central American and Caribbean; Junior Championships (U-20)	San Juan, Puerto Rico	2nd	Discus	43.64 m
1984	Central American and Caribbean; Junior Championships (U-20)	San Juan, Puerto Rico	1st	Javelin	50.64 m
1985	Central American and Caribbean Championships	Nassau, Bahamas	3rd	Shot	14.54 m
1986	Central American and Caribbean Games	Santiago, Dominican Republic	6th	Javelin	47.34 m
1987	Pan American Games	Indianapolis, United States	5th	Javelin	55.70 m
1988	Olympic Games	Seoul, South Korea	16th (q)	Javelin	60.02 m
1989	Central American and Caribbean Championships	San Juan, Puerto Rico	1st	Javelin	62.42 m
1990	Goodwill Games	Seattle, United States	5th	Javelin	56.84 m
1991	Central American and Caribbean Championships	Xalapa, Mexico	1st	Javelin	47.60 m
1991	Pan American Games	Havana, Cuba	4th	Javelin	56.38 m
1993	Central American and Caribbean Games	Ponce, Puerto Rico	3rd	Shot	15.35 m
1994	Commonwealth Games	Victoria, Canada	7th	Javelin	55.54 m
1995	Pan American Games	Mar del Plata, Argentina	2nd	Javelin	61.28 m
1996	Olympic Games	Atlanta, United States	17th (q)	Javelin	58.48 m
1997	Central American and Caribbean Championships	San Juan, Puerto Rico	2nd	Javelin	58.16 m
1998	Central American and Caribbean Games	Maracaibo, Venezuela	3rd	Javelin	60.66 m
1999	Central American and Caribbean Championships	Bridgetown, Barbados	1st	Javelin	61.61 m (CR)
1999	Pan American Games	Winnipeg, Canada	3rd	Javelin	61.24 m
1999	World Championships	Seville, Spain	18th	Javelin	57.97 m
2000	Olympic Games	Sydney, Australia	16th (q)	Javelin	58.36 m
2001	Central American and Caribbean Championships	Guatemala City, Guatemala	1st	Javelin	59.30 m
2001	World Championships	Edmonton, Canada	17th	Javelin	56.10 m
2002	Commonwealth Games	Manchester, United Kingdom	1st	Javelin	58.46 m
2003	Central American and Caribbean Championships	St. George's, Grenada	1st	Javelin	56.75 m
2003	Pan American Games	Santo Domingo, Dom. Rep.	2nd	Javelin	60.68 m
2004	Olympic Games	Athens, Greece	6th	Javelin	62.77 m
2005	Central American and Caribbean Championships	Nassau, Bahamas	1st	Javelin	61.11 m
2005	World Championships	Helsinki, Finland	10th	Javelin	57.10 m
2006	Commonwealth Games	Melbourne, Australia	2nd	Javelin	60.54 m
2006	Central American and Caribbean Games	Cartagena, Colombia	3rd	Javelin	57.29 m
2007	Pan American Games	Rio de Janeiro, Brazil	3rd	Javelin	58.10 m
2007	World Championships	Osaka, Japan	20th	Javelin	56.87 m
2008	Central American and Caribbean Championships	Cali, Colombia	1st	Javelin	56.36 m
2008	Olympic Games	Beijing, China	19th (q)	Javelin	57.36 m
2009	Central American and Caribbean Championships	Havana, Cuba	3rd	Javelin	58.69 m
2010	Central American and Caribbean Games	Mayagüez, Puerto Rico	4th	Javelin	51.02 m
2010	Commonwealth Games	Delhi, India	10th	Javelin	50.40 m
2011	Central American and Caribbean Championships	Mayagüez, Puerto Rico	5th	Javelin	50.41 m
2011	Pan American Games	Guadalajara, Mexico	9th	Javelin	50.82 m
