= Sandie Richards =

Jamaican sprinter

Personal information
- Born: 6 November 1968 (age 57) Clarendon Park, Jamaica

Sport
- Sport: Track and field
Medal record
Representing Jamaica
Olympic Games
| Silver medal – second place | 2000 Sydney | 4 × 400 m relay |
| Bronze medal – third place | 2004 Athens | 4 × 400 m relay |
World Championships
| Gold medal – first place | 2001 Edmonton | 4 × 400 m relay |
| Silver medal – second place | 1997 Athens | 400 metres |
| Bronze medal – third place | 1993 Stuttgart | 400 metres |
| Bronze medal – third place | 1997 Athens | 4 × 400 m relay |
| Bronze medal – third place | 2003 Paris | 4 × 400 m relay |
World Indoor Championships
| Gold medal – first place | 1993 Toronto | 400 metres |
| Gold medal – first place | 1993 Toronto | 4 × 400 m relay |
| Gold medal – first place | 2001 Lisbon | 400 metres |
| Silver medal – second place | 1995 Barcelona | 400 metres |
| Silver medal – second place | 1997 Paris | 400 metres |
| Silver medal – second place | 2001 Lisbon | 4 × 400 m relay |
| Silver medal – second place | 2003 Birmingham | 4 × 400 m relay |
Commonwealth Games
| Gold medal – first place | 1998 Kuala Lumpur | 400 metres |
| Bronze medal – third place | 2002 Manchester | 400 metres |
Central American and Caribbean Games
| Gold medal – first place | 1998 Maracaibo | 400 metres |
Summer Universiade
| Bronze medal – third place | 1987 Zagreb | 400 metres |
World Junior Championships
| Bronze medal – third place | 1986 Athens | 400 metres |

Angella "Sandie" Richards (born 6 November 1968) is a Jamaican track and field athlete. She won four World Championships and two Olympic medals in the 4 × 100 m relay, a silver in the 2000 Olympics in Sydney and a bronze at the 2004 Olympic Games in Athens, Greece.

== Career ==
She was a world junior representative, finishing third in the 400 m at the 1986 Championships. The next year, she won bronze at the Summer Universiade, followed by her Olympic debut a year later in Seoul, South Korea.

Richards competed for San Jacinto College and then the Texas Longhorns women's track and field team, where she won the 1990 4 × 400 meter relay at the NCAA Division I Indoor Track and Field Championships.

In 1998, Richards won Commonwealth gold at 1998 Commonwealth Games and won a 400 m bronze and relay gold at the 1998 Goodwill Games. She was a member of the winning 4 × 400 m relay team at the 2001 World Championships, taking Jamaica's first ever mile relay gold medal in the 18-year history of the championships. At the opening ceremony of the 2001 World Championships, she captained the Jamaican team and carried the flag. She has the record for the most World Indoor final appearances with nine (five at 400 m and four at 4 × 400 m). She graduated in sociology from the University of Texas at Austin.

== International competitions ==
| Year | Competition | Venue | Position | Event | Notes |
Representing Jamaica
| 1984 | CARIFTA Games (U-17) | Nassau, Bahamas | 2nd | 400 m | 54.81 |
| 1984 | Central American and Caribbean Junior Championships (U-17) | San Juan, Puerto Rico | 1st | 400 m | 55.77 |
| 1985 | CARIFTA Games (U-20) | Bridgetown, Barbados | 2nd | 800 m | 2:13.18 |
| 1986 | CARIFTA Games | Les Abymes, Guadeloupe | 2nd | 200 m | 23.66 |
| 1986 | CARIFTA Games | Les Abymes, Guadeloupe | 1st | 400 m | 52.18 |
| 1986 | World Junior Championships | Athens, Greece | 3rd | 400 m | 52.23 |

Olympic Games
| Preceded by Winston Watts | Flag bearer for Jamaica; Athens 2004 | Succeeded by Veronica Campbell-Brown |
