= 1990 World Junior Championships in Athletics – Men's 10,000 metres walk =

The men's 10,000 metres walk event at the 1990 World Junior Championships in Athletics was held in Plovdiv, Bulgaria, at Deveti Septemvri Stadium on 10 August.

== Medalists ==
Gold	Ilya Markov; Soviet Union
Silver	Alberto Cruz; Mexico
Bronze	Jefferson Pérez; Ecuador

== Results ==
=== Final ===
10 August

Rank	Name	Nationality	Time	Notes
1st place, gold medalist(s)	Ilya Markov	Soviet Union	39:55.52	
2nd place, silver medalist(s)	Alberto Cruz	Mexico	39:56.49	
3rd place, bronze medalist(s)	Jefferson Pérez	Ecuador	40:08.23	
4	Ignacio Zamudio	Mexico	41:26.92	
5	Sergio Roca	Spain	41:36.14	
6	Fernando Vázquez	Spain	41:51.50	
7	Markus Pauly	East Germany	42:27.38	
8	Steven Beecroft	Australia	42:33.12	
9	Rudolf Cogan	Czechoslovakia	42:36.54	
10	Ralf Rose	East Germany	42:41.18	
11	Michele Lizio	Italy	42:58.69	
12	Frédéric Herse	France	43:20.00	
13	João Sendenski	Brazil	43:30.36	
14	Martin St. Pierre	Canada	43:34.46	
15	Martin Hedlund	Sweden	44:29.70	
16	Philip Dunn	United States	44:45.55	
17	Mohamed El-Mimouni	Morocco	45:31.92	
18	Matthew O'Donnell	Australia	45:59.86	
19	Musa Aouanouk	Algeria	46:25.21	
	Sergey Tyulenev	Soviet Union	DQ	
	Martin Engelsviken	Norway	DQ	

== Participation ==
According to an unofficial count, 21 athletes from 16 countries participated in the event.

- Algeria (1)
- Australia (2)
- Brazil (1)
- Canada (1)
- Czechoslovakia (1)
- East Germany (2)
- Ecuador (1)
- France (1)
- Italy (1)
- Mexico (2)
- Morocco (1)
- Norway (1)
- Soviet Union (2)
- Spain (2)
- Sweden (1)
- United States (1)
