= Joey Wells =

Bahamian long jumper

Medal record

Men's athletics

Representing Bahamas

CAC Junior Championships (U20)
Gold medal – first place	1984 San Juan	Long jump
Gold medal – first place	1982 Bridgetown	Long jump
Silver medal – second place	1982 Bridgetown	200 m
Bronze medal – third place	1984 San Juan	4x100 m relay

CAC Junior Championships (U17)
Gold medal – first place	1980 Nassau	Long jump
Bronze medal – third place	1980 Nassau	Heptathlon

CARIFTA Games Junior (U20)
Gold medal – first place	1984 Nassau	Long Jump
Gold medal – first place	1983 Fort-de-France	Long Jump
Gold medal – first place	1982 Kingston	Long Jump
Silver medal – second place	1983 Fort-de-France	200m

CARIFTA Games Youth (U17)
Gold medal – first place	1980 Hamilton	Long Jump
Silver medal – second place	1980 Hamilton	200m
Silver medal – second place	1980 Hamilton	400m

Pan American Junior Championships
Gold medal – first place	1984 Nassau	Long Jump

Joseph ("Joey") Wells (born December 22, 1965) is a retired male long jumper from the Bahamas, best known for finishing sixth at the 1984 Olympic Games.

Wells attended Government High School, Nassau. He competed for the Arkansas Razorbacks track and field team in the NCAA.

== Achievements ==
Year	Competition	Venue	Position	Event	Notes
Representing the Bahamas
1980	CARIFTA Games (U-17)	Hamilton, Bermuda	2nd	200 m	22.74
1980	CARIFTA Games (U-17)	Hamilton, Bermuda	2nd	400 m	50.05
1980	CARIFTA Games (U-17)	Hamilton, Bermuda	1st	Long jump	7.02 m
1980	Central American and Caribbean; Junior Championships (U-17)	Nassau, Bahamas	5th	200 m	23.0
1980	Central American and Caribbean; Junior Championships (U-17)	Nassau, Bahamas	5th	400 m	50.0
1980	Central American and Caribbean; Junior Championships (U-17)	Nassau, Bahamas	1st	Long jump	6.93 m
1980	Central American and Caribbean; Junior Championships (U-17)	Nassau, Bahamas	3rd	Heptathlon	3963 pts
1981	CARIFTA Games (U-20)	Nassau, Bahamas	5th	Long jump	7.09 m
1982	CARIFTA Games (U-20)	Kingston, Jamaica	1st	Long jump	7.21 m
1982	Central American and Caribbean; Junior Championships (U-20)	Bridgetown, Barbados	7th	100 m	10.95
1982	Central American and Caribbean; Junior Championships (U-20)	Bridgetown, Barbados	2nd	200 m	21.29
1982	Central American and Caribbean; Junior Championships (U-20)	Bridgetown, Barbados	6th	4 × 100 m relay	42.66
1982	Central American and Caribbean; Junior Championships (U-20)	Bridgetown, Barbados	1st	Long jump	7.60 m
1982	Central American and Caribbean Games	Havana, Cuba	5th	Long jump	7.57 m
1983	CARIFTA Games (U-20)	Fort-de-France, Martinique	2nd	200 m	21.27
1983	CARIFTA Games (U-20)	Fort-de-France, Martinique	1st	Long jump	7.80 m
1983	Central American and Caribbean Championships	Havana, Cuba	2nd	4 × 100 m relay	40.34
1983	Central American and Caribbean Championships	Havana, Cuba	2nd	Long jump	8.04 m
1983	World Championships	Helsinki, Finland	20th	Long jump	7.69 m
1984	CARIFTA Games (U-20)	Nassau, Bahamas	1st	Long jump	7.36 m
1984	Central American and Caribbean; Junior Championships (U-20)	San Juan, Puerto Rico	1st	Long jump	7.55 m
1984	Central American and Caribbean; Junior Championships (U-20)	San Juan, Puerto Rico	3rd	4 × 100 m relay	42.74
1984	Olympic Games	Los Angeles, United States	6th	Long jump	7.97 m
