= 1986 World Junior Championships in Athletics – Women's 400 metres =

The women's 400 metres event at the 1986 World Junior Championships in Athletics was held in Athens, Greece, at Olympic Stadium on 16, 17 and 18 July.

== Medalists ==
Gold	Susanne Sieger; East Germany
Silver	Olga Pesnopevtseva; Soviet Union
Bronze	Sandie Richards; Jamaica

== Results ==
=== Final ===
18 July

Rank	Name	Nationality	Time	Notes
1st place, gold medalist(s)	Susanne Sieger	East Germany	52.02	
2nd place, silver medalist(s)	Olga Pesnopevtseva	Soviet Union	52.17	
3rd place, bronze medalist(s)	Sandie Richards	Jamaica	52.23	
4	Janeene Vickers	United States	52.25	
5	Tasha Downing	United States	53.21	
6	Lacramioara Andrei	Romania	53.57	
7	Małgorzata Kurach	Poland	54.18	
8	Ulrike Alge	Austria	54.55	

=== Semifinals ===
17 July

==== Semifinal 1 ====
Rank	Name	Nationality	Time	Notes
1	Olga Pesnopevtseva	Soviet Union	52.40	Q
2	Tasha Downing	United States	53.38	Q
3	Lacramioara Andrei	Romania	53.71	Q
4	Małgorzata Kurach	Poland	53.87	Q
5	Julia Merino	Spain	54.84	
6	Rossana Morabito	Italy	55.04	
7	Noemi Batori	Hungary	55.17	
8	Maxine Scringer	Canada	55.19	

==== Semifinal 2 ====
Rank	Name	Nationality	Time	Notes
1	Sandie Richards	Jamaica	52.53	Q
2	Susanne Sieger	East Germany	52.82	Q
3	Janeene Vickers	United States	53.93	Q
4	Ulrike Alge	Austria	54.70	Q
5	Sabine Nolte	West Germany	55.20	
6	Diane Dunrod	Saint Kitts and Nevis	56.57	
7	Cheryl Allen	Canada	56.92	
8	Timea Kovács	Hungary	57.31	

=== Heats ===
16 July

==== Heat 1 ====
Rank	Name	Nationality	Time	Notes
1	Lacramioara Andrei	Romania	54.38	Q
2	Cheryl Allen	Canada	54.58	Q
3	Rossana Morabito	Italy	54.77	Q
4	Marina Khripankova	Soviet Union	55.26	
5	Jupira da Graça	Brazil	56.37	
6	Sotiría Mavromáti	Greece	57.59	
7	Guilhermina da Cruz	Angola	58.20	

==== Heat 2 ====
Rank	Name	Nationality	Time	Notes
1	Susanne Sieger	East Germany	52.97	Q
2	Sabine Nolte	West Germany	54.75	Q
3	Julia Merino	Spain	54.76	Q
4	Noemi Batori	Hungary	54.92	q
5	Sanja Beckei	Yugoslavia	55.27	

==== Heat 3 ====
Rank	Name	Nationality	Time	Notes
1	Janeene Vickers	United States	55.23	Q
2	Małgorzata Kurach	Poland	55.86	Q
3	Timea Kovács	Hungary	55.97	Q
4	Christine Duvergé	Mauritius	56.61	
5	Chen Ya-Li	Chinese Taipei	56.83	
6	Adriana Martínez	Ecuador	56.93	

==== Heat 4 ====
Rank	Name	Nationality	Time	Notes
1	Sandie Richards	Jamaica	53.25	Q
2	Ulrike Alge	Austria	54.89	Q
3	Maxine Scringer	Canada	56.20	Q
4	Patricia Serret	Mauritius	56.50	
5	Anna Cherry	Saint Lucia	59.20	
6	Valeria López	Ecuador	60.70	
7	Rose Sisana Dlamini	Swaziland	62.82	

==== Heat 5 ====
Rank	Name	Nationality	Time	Notes
1	Olga Pesnopevtseva	Soviet Union	52.73	Q
2	Tasha Downing	United States	53.41	Q
3	Diane Dunrod	Saint Kitts and Nevis	54.90	Q
4	Donya Mohamed	Iraq	55.76	
5	Josephine Ikolomi	Nigeria	57.46	
6	Jacinta Kimwetich	Kenya	58.13	
7	Rowan Maynard	Antigua and Barbuda	60.06	
8	Rosanna Browne	Anguilla	65.32	

== Participation ==
According to an unofficial count, 33 athletes from 27 countries participated in the event.

- Angola (1)
- Anguilla (1)
- Antigua and Barbuda (1)
- Austria (1)
- Brazil (1)
- Canada (2)
- Chinese Taipei (1)
- East Germany (1)
- Ecuador (2)
- Greece (1)
- Hungary (2)
- Iraq (1)
- Italy (1)
- Jamaica (1)
- Kenya (1)
- Mauritius (2)
- Nigeria (1)
- Poland (1)
- Romania (1)
- Saint Kitts and Nevis (1)
- Saint Lucia (1)
- Soviet Union (2)
- Spain (1)
- Swaziland (1)
- United States (2)
- West Germany (1)
- Yugoslavia (1)
