= Ignacio Zamudio =

Mexican race walker (born 1971)

Personal information
- Full name: Ignacio Zamudio Cruz
- Born: 15 May 1971 (age 55) Mexico City, Mexico
- Height: 1.68 m (5 ft 6 in)
- Weight: 65 kg (143 lb)

Sport
- Country: Mexico
- Sport: Athletics
- Event: Race walking
Medal record
Race walking
Representing Mexico
CAC Junior Championships (U20)
Silver medal – second place	1988 Nassau	10,000 m walk
Silver medal – second place	1990 Havana	10,000 m walk
- Updated on 27 July 2013

Ignacio Zamudio Cruz (born 15 May 1971) is a Mexican race walker.

== Personal bests ==
- 20 km: 1:22:06 hrs – Eisenhüttenstadt, Germany, 8 May 1999
- 50 km: 3:46:07 hrs – Atlanta, United States, 2 August 1996

== Achievements ==
Year	Competition	Venue	Position	Event	Notes
Representing Mexico
1988	Central American and Caribbean Junior Championships (U-20)	Nassau, Bahamas	2nd	10,000 m	46:41
1990	Central American and Caribbean Junior Championships (U-20)	Havana, Cuba	2nd	10,000 m	44:52.56
1990	Pan American Race Walking Cup	Xalapa, Mexico	—^{*}	20 km	1:26:54
1990	World Junior Championships	Plovdiv, Bulgaria	4th	10,000m	41:26.92
1993	World Race Walking Cup	Monterrey, Mexico	14th	20 km	1:27:24
1993	World Championships	Stuttgart, Germany	9th	20 km	1:24:32
1993	Central American and Caribbean Games	Ponce, Puerto Rico	–	20 km	DNF
1996	Olympic Games	Atlanta, United States	6th	50 km	3:46:07
1998	Pan American Race Walking Cup	Miami, United States	1st	20 km	1:28:33
1998	Central American and Caribbean Games	Maracaibo, Venezuela	1st	50 km	3:58:15

^{*}: Started as a guest out of competition.
