= Jacinta Bartholomew =

Grenadian long jumper

Personal information
- Full name: Jacinta Bartholomew
- Nationality: Grenadian
- Born: January 15, 1965 (age 61) St. George's, Grenada

Sport
- Country: Grenada
- Sport: Athletics
- Event(s): Long Jump; Sprints
- College team: Arizona State Sun Devils

Jacinta Bartholomew (born 15 January 1965) is a retired Grenadian athlete who specialized in the Long Jump. She represented Grenada in this event at the 1984 Summer Olympics, as part of the country's first contingent to the games and was the only female member, and therefore the first woman to represent the nation at the Olympics. As expected she competed in the Long Jump but did not progress beyond the preliminary stage.

She earned Indoor and Outdoor honors in 1988 as a member of the NCAA champion 4x100 meter team and also placed and also placed third in the long jump and 4x400 meter relay. At the Penn Relays in the same year, she was runner up in the long jump and was on the winning, 4x100, 4x200 and 4x400 relay teams. In 1989 she became a PAC 10 Medalist. Jacinta holds the women's national indoor record in the long jump, a distance of 6.46m set on 23 February 1990.

After a successful career at the college level in athletics, Bartholomew now has an official Arizona State University Trading Card in her honor.

== Competition record ==
Year	Competition	Venue	Position	Event	Notes
Representing Grenada
1982	CARIFTA Games	Kingston, Jamaica	3rd	Long Jump (U20)	5.40 m
1983	CARIFTA Games	Fort-de-France, Martinique	1st	Long Jump (U20)	5.88 m
1983	World Championships	Helsinki, Finland	11th	Long Jump	5.77 m (+2.4)
1984	Summer Olympic Games	Los Angeles, California	17th	Long Jump	6.07 m
