= Kirt Thompson =

Medal record

Men's Athletics

Representing Trinidad and Tobago

CARIFTA Games Junior (U20)
Bronze medal – third place	1986 Les Abymes	Javelin Throw

Kirt Thompson (born December 13, 1967) is a retired male javelin thrower from Trinidad and Tobago, who represented his native country at the 1996 Summer Olympics in Atlanta, Georgia. He set his personal best (78.06 metres) on May 25, 1996 in Riverside. Thompson was affiliated with the Ashland University.

== Achievements ==
Year	Competition	Venue	Position	Notes
Representing Trinidad and Tobago
1990	Central American and Caribbean Games	Mexico City, Mexico	3rd	75.38 m
1996	Olympic Games	Atlanta, United States	33rd	68.02 m
