= Marie-France Loval =

French sprinter

Medal record

Women's athletics

Representing Guadeloupe

CARIFTA Games Junior (U20)
Gold medal – first place	1981 Nassau	100m
Gold medal – first place	1982 Kingston	100m
Gold medal – first place	1983 Fort-de-France	100m

Marie-France Loval (born 12 August 1964 in Pointe-à-Pitre, Guadeloupe) is a French track and field athlete, who specialises in the 100 meters. Loval competed in the women's 100 meters and the 4 × 100 m relay at the 1984 Summer Olympics.
