= Craig Hepburn =

Bahamian long jumper

Personal information
- Born: 10 December 1969 (age 56)

Sport
- Sport: Track and field
Medal record
Representing Bahamas
CAC Junior Championships (U20)
Gold medal – first place	1988 Nassau	Long jump
CARIFTA Games Junior (U20)
Bronze medal – third place	1988 Kingston	400m hurdles
Bronze medal – third place	1988 Kingston	Long Jump

Craig Daniel Hepburn (born 10 December 1969) is a retired male long jumper from the Bahamas, best known for finishing 13th at the 1992 Olympic Games. His personal best is 8.41 metres, achieved in June 1993 in Nassau. This is the national record.

Hepburn competed for the Auburn Tigers track and field team in the NCAA.

== Achievements ==
Year	Competition	Venue	Position	Event	Notes
Representing the Bahamas
1988	CARIFTA Games (U-20)	Kingston, Jamaica	3rd	400 m hurdles	56.73
1988	CARIFTA Games (U-20)	Kingston, Jamaica	3rd	Long jump	7.16 m
1988	Central American and Caribbean Junior Championships (U-20)	Nassau, Bahamas	7th	110 m hurdles	16.76
1988	Central American and Caribbean Junior Championships (U-20)	Nassau, Bahamas	6th	400 m hurdles	56.58
1988	Central American and Caribbean Junior Championships (U-20)	Nassau, Bahamas	1st	Long jump	7.18 m
1991	Central American and Caribbean Championships	Xalapa, Mexico	3rd	Long jump	7.71 m w A
1992	Olympic Games	Barcelona, Spain	13th	Long jump	7.89 m
1997	Central American and Caribbean Championships	San Juan, Puerto Rico	3rd	Long jump	7.93 m w
1997	Central American and Caribbean Championships	San Juan, Puerto Rico	3rd	4 × 100 m relay	39.85
1999	Central American and Caribbean Championships	Bridgetown, Barbados	1st	Long jump	7.75 m
