= Andrea Thomas (Jamaican athlete) =

Jamaican athlete (born 1968)

Medal record

Women's athletics

Representing Jamaica

CARIFTA Games Junior (U20)
Gold medal – first place	1985 Bridgetown	400m
Gold medal – first place	1985 Bridgetown	800m
Gold medal – first place	1986 Les Abymes	800m
Silver medal – second place	1986 Les Abymes	400m

Pan American Junior Athletics Championships
Gold medal – first place	1984 Nassau	400 m
Bronze medal – third place	1984 Nassau	800 m

Andrea Thomas (born 3 August 1968 in Clarendon Park, Clarendon, Jamaica) is a retired Jamaican athlete who competed in the 1984 and 1988 Olympics.

Thomas competed for the Morgan State Bears track and field team in the NCAA.

In 1985, she was awarded the Austin Sealy Trophy for the most outstanding athlete of the 1985 CARIFTA Games.

== International competitions ==
Year	Competition	Venue	Position	Event	Notes
Representing Jamaica
1982	CARIFTA Games (U-17)	Kingston, Jamaica	1st	400 m	55.61
1982	CARIFTA Games (U-17)	Kingston, Jamaica	1st	800 m	2:13.1
1982	Central American and Caribbean Junior Championships (U-17)	Bridgetown, Barbados	6th	400 m	60.70
1982	Central American and Caribbean Junior Championships (U-17)	Bridgetown, Barbados	2nd	800 m	2:18.59
1982	Central American and Caribbean Junior Championships (U-17)	Bridgetown, Barbados	4th	4 × 400 m relay	4:08.16
1986	World Junior Championships	Athens, Greece	30th (h)	800m	2:13.69
