= Ray Stewart (sprinter) =

Jamaican sprinter (born 1965)

Personal information
- Born: Raymond Stewart; 18 March 1965 (age 61) Kingston, Jamaica
- Height: 1.78 m (5 ft 10 in)
- Weight: 73 kg (161 lb)

Sport
- Sport: Running
- Events: 100 metres, 200 metres
- College team: TCU Horned Frogs
Medal record
Representing Jamaica
Men's Athletics
Olympic Games
Silver medal – second place	1984 Los Angeles	4x100 m relay
World Championships
Silver medal – second place	1987 Rome	100 m
Bronze medal – third place	1987 Rome	4x100 m relay
Commonwealth Games
Bronze medal – third place	1990 Auckland	4x100 m relay
Pan American Games
Silver medal – second place	1987 Indianapolis	100 m
Bronze medal – third place	1987 Indianapolis	4x100 m relay
CAC Junior Championships (U20)
Gold medal – first place	1982 Bridgetown	4x100 m relay
CARIFTA Games (Under 20s)
Gold medal – first place	1982 Kingston	4x100m Relay
Gold medal – first place	1983 Fort-de-France	200 m
Gold medal – first place	1984 Nassau	100 m
Gold medal – first place	1984 Nassau	4x100 m relay
Silver medal – second place	1983 Fort-de-France	100 m
Bronze medal – third place	1983 Fort-de-France	4x100 m relay
CARIFTA Games (Under 17s)
Gold medal – first place	1981 Nassau	100 m
Gold medal – first place	1981 Nassau	200 m

Raymond Douglas Stewart (born 18 March 1965) is a Jamaican former athlete who specialised in the 100 metres event. As a junior athlete Stewart found much success at the CARIFTA Games, winning five gold medals within a four-year period. In 1984 he reached the 100 m Olympic final and won an Olympic silver medal for the 4×100 metres relay. At the 1987 World Championships he took silver in the 100 m and bronze with the Jamaican relay team. A leg injury in the 1988 Olympic final of the 100 m ruined his medal chances in both the individual and relay events.

A new personal best of 9.97 seconds at the NCAA Outdoor Championships made him the number one ranked 100 m athlete in 1989 and the first Jamaican to officially break the 10-second barrier. At the competition he also recorded the third fastest relay time ever. He won his first Commonwealth Games medal the following year, taking bronze in the relay. Stewart recorded a national record of 9.96 seconds at the 1991 World Championships but this was surprisingly only enough for sixth place; two continental records and the world record were broken in the race. Stewart reached his third consecutive Olympic 100 m final in 1992, becoming the first man to do so. He reached the 1993 and 1995 World Championship finals of the 100 m but failed to medal. He attended his last Olympics in 1996.

Stewart had a career that lasted almost twenty years, competing at four successive Olympic Games and six World Championships. He also won the 100 m at the Jamaican national championships seven times. His 100 m personal best of 9.96 seconds makes him the fifth fastest Jamaican sprinter in the event, after Usain Bolt, Asafa Powell, Nesta Carter and Yohan Blake.

He went on to coach a number of prominent sprinters, including Jerome Young, but received a life-ban from athletics in 2010 as he had allegedly obtained performance-enhancing drugs for his athletes.

== Career ==
Stewart attended Camperdown High School, and was coached by Glen Mills. After leaving Camperdown Stewart attended Texas Christian University in Fort Worth, Texas

=== 1981 ===
Running in the Under 17 Boy's category Stewart won the 100 m event at the CARIFTA Games in Nassau, his time being 10.9 s. He completed a successful double by winning the 200 m in 22.32 s.

=== 1983 ===
At the CARIFTA Games in Fort-de-France Stewart finished second in the Under 20 Men 100 m, in a wind aided 10.40. He won the 200 m event in the same category in 21.13 s. A bronze medal with the 4 × 100 m relay team was earned with a time of 41.28 s.

At the inaugural World Championships in Helsinki Stewart, only 18 years old, finished fifth in heat two of the 100 m semi final. His time of 10.40 was .01 slower than the third- and fourth-place finishers in his heat. Stewart also ran the second leg of the Jamaican 4 × 100 m relay team, which finished seventh in 38.75 s.

=== 1984 ===
Stewart won the 100 m Jamaica National Championship in 10.37.

In the Nassau CARIFTA Games Stewart won both the Under 20 Men 100 m in 10.2 s, and the 4 × 100 m relay in 41.0 s.

At the 1984 Olympics in Los Angeles Stewart won a silver medal with the Jamaican relay team. Running the anchor leg in a timed 9.28 s, Stewart passed the Canadian Sterling Hinds and crossed the line to record a finishing time of 38.62 In addition to that he came sixth in the 100 m final, his time 10.29 with 0.2 m/s wind. At 19 years old, he was the youngest athlete to compete in the 100 m Olympic final, and had won each of his heats on his way to the final.

=== 1985 ===
Stewart started attendance at Texas Christian University.

=== 1986 ===
Stewart won the 100 m Jamaica National Championship in 10.35. Stewart's season was cut short by a quadriceps injury.

=== 1987 ===
Stewart ran the anchor leg of the 4 × 100 m at the NCAA Outdoor Championships at Baton Rouge. TCU's winning time of 38.62 was the fastest time by any collegiate team of the season. Stewart also won the individual NCAA 100 m Outdoor championship.

Stewart again won the 100 m Jamaica National Championship, in 10.30.

He won two medals at the 1987 World Championships in Rome. Recording 10.08 s, he won the bronze medal in the 100 m, behind Ben Johnson and Carl Lewis; his finish position and medal were later upgraded after Johnson was disqualified following his positive test for a steroid at the 1988 Olympics and later admission of seven years of use. Running the anchor leg for the 4 × 100 m relay team he earned a bronze medal in 38.41 s. Stewart finished the season ranked number four in the world.

=== 1988 ===
Stewart won the 100 m Jamaica National Championship for the third consecutive year, in 10.08.

At the 1988 Summer Olympics in Seoul, Stewart came eighth in the 100 m final despite qualifying fourth fastest from the semi-finals; his time of 12.26 was a result of slowing down before the end due to a leg injury. His position was later improved to seventh following the disqualification of race winner Ben Johnson. Because of his injury Stewart did not run on the 4 × 100 m relay team, which finished fourth in the final. He finished the season ranked seventh in the world.

=== 1989 ===
In addition to winning the NCCA Indoor 55 m championship, Stewart won the 100 m at the NCAA Outdoor Championships in Provo, Utah in 9.97, and also ran the anchor leg for the winning TCU 4 × 100 m team. The time 38.23 was a new collegiate record, and at the time was the third fastest in history. Stewart also won the 100 m Jamaica National Championship for the fourth consecutive year, in 10.27. Stewart was the top ranked 100 m male athlete in the world.

=== 1990 ===
At the Commonwealth Games in Auckland Stewart finished eighth in his 100m semi final in 11.15 s. Running the third leg for the 4 × 100 m relay Stewart received a bronze medal, the team recording 39.11 s.

=== 1991 ===
Stewart won the 100 m Jamaica National Championship, in a wind assisted 10.21.

At the World Championships in Tokyo Japan, Stewart recorded his personal best 9.96 s in the 100 m final, leading the race at the 50 m mark, and was equal first at 60 m. However his effort was only good enough for sixth place. He again recorded a sixth-place finish, in the final of the 4 × 100 m relay. Stewart ran the second leg and the team recorded a time of 38.67 s.

At the end of the season Stewart was the seventh ranked male 100 m athlete. This was to be his final year ranking in the top ten.

=== 1992 ===
Stewart won his seventh and final 100 m Jamaica National Championship, in 10.10.

At the 1992 Summer Olympics in Barcelona. Stewart came seventh in the 100 m final in 10.22 s. This marked his third consecutive race in an Olympic 100 m final, making him the first man to do so. The Jamaican 4 × 100 m relay team with Stewart on anchor registered a DNF in their heat.

=== 1993 ===
Stewart won his first 200 m Jamaican National Championship, in 20.80.

At the World championships in Stuttgart Stewart finished eighth in the 100 m, in a time of 10.18 s.

=== 1995 ===
At the World Championships in Gothenburg Stewart again finished eighth, in 10.29 s. The 4 × 100 m relay team anchored by Stewart finished fourth in 39.10 s. Stewart had made the 100 m final of four consecutive World Championships, the first two of which were spaced four years apart.

=== 1996 ===
At the January Boston Indoor Games Stewart finished third in the 60 m, in 6.72 s.

Competing in his fourth Olympics, Stewart recorded 10.18 s in his quarter final heat of the 100 m, a time insufficient to move him to the semi-finals. Emmanuel Tuffour of Ghana received the final qualifying spot for the semi-finals with an identical 10.18 s. Stewart ran the anchor leg in 9.14 s for the 4 × 100 m relay, the team recording a time of 38.81 for fourth place in its semi final. The team was then disqualified.

=== 1997 ===
Stewart finished fourth in the 60 m at the World Indoor Championships in Paris, his time 6.55 s.

=== 1999 ===
In the February Stockholm Indoor Meeting Stewart finished fourth in 60 m heat two, in 6.74 s. He failed to advance to the final

At the Sevilla World Championships Stewart finished fourth in heat three, running the anchor leg for the Jamaican 4 × 100 m team, in 38.86 s. The time was not good enough for advancing to the final.

=== Post competition life ===
On 13 April 2008 the New York Times published an article in which Stewart was implicated by Angel Guillermo Heredia for the use of human growth hormone. A copy of an e-mail message from July 2003 was shown to the Times, in which Herdia described drugs he had recommended for two athletes trained by Stewart. When contacted Stewart initially denied knowing Heredia but then said that they had met after being shown a copy of the e-mail. Stewart then stated that he had rejected the drugs offered by Heredia.

In April 2009 Stewart's name was further tarnished following the IAAF stripping Jerome Young of his World Championship results following Young's admission of doping from 1991 through 2003. Stewart once coached Young. At the New York launch of the 2009 Penn Relays, Stewart was honoured by Team Jamaica Bickle for his contribution to athletics.

In June 2010 Stewart was banned from coaching for life by the USADA.

== Accomplishments and major competition results ==
=== Personal bests ===
His personal best in the 50 m event is the third fastest time by a Jamaican.

Event	Time (seconds)	Venue	Date
50 metres	5.65	Liévin, France	16 February 1997
60 metres	6.52	Liévin, United States	16 February 1997
100 metres	9.96	Tokyo, Japan	25 August 1991
200 metres	20.75	Nassau, Bahamas	26 May 1999

==== Time progression in the 100 m ====
Year	Time	Windspeed	City	Date
1983	10.22	2.30	Helsinki	7 August
1984	10.19		Port of Spain	19 May
1987	10.08	1.00	Rome	30 August
1989	9.97	1.0	Waco	28 May
1991	9.96	1.20	Tokyo	25 August
1992	10.22	0.50	Barcelona	1 August
1993	10.11	-0.10	Stuttgart	14 August
1994	10.21	1.60	São Paulo	21 May
1995	10.17	1.80	Gothenburg	6 August
1997	10.27	0.00	Roma	5 July
1999	10.22	1.60	Nassau	26 May
2000	10.31	0.50	Kingston	21 July
2001	10.34	1.60	Arlington	5 May

=== Track records ===
As of 6 September 2024, Stewart holds the following track records for 100 metres.

Location	Time	Windspeed m/s	Date
Provo, Utah	9.97	+ 2.4	03/06/1989
Vigo	9.90	+ 2.9	30/06/1989

== International competitions ==
Representing Jamaica
Year	Competition	Venue	Position	Event	Result	Notes
1981	CARIFTA Games (U-17)	Nassau, Bahamas	1st	100 m	10.9	
1981	CARIFTA Games (U-17)	Nassau, Bahamas	1st	200 m	22.32	
1982	CARIFTA Games (U-20)	Kingston, Jamaica	5th	200 m	22.3	
1982	CARIFTA Games (U-20)	Kingston, Jamaica	1st	4 × 100 m relay	41.70	
1982	Central American and Caribbean Junior Championships (U-20)	Bridgetown, Barbados	1st	4 × 100 m relay	40.68	
1983	CARIFTA Games (U-20)	Fort-de-France, Martinique	2nd	100 m	10.40 w (2.8 m/s)	
1983	CARIFTA Games (U-20)	Fort-de-France, Martinique	1st	200 m	21.13	
1983	CARIFTA Games (U-20)	Fort-de-France, Martinique	3rd	200 m	41.28	
1984	CARIFTA Games (U-20)	Nassau, Bahamas	1st	100 m	10.2	
1984	CARIFTA Games (U-20)	Nassau, Bahamas	1st	4 × 100 m relay	41.0	
