= Jacqueline Ross =

Vincentian athlete

Jacqueline Mattox
Personal information
- Born: 26 September 1969 (age 56)

Sport
- Country: Saint Vincent and the Grenadines
- Sport: Athletics
Medal record
Women's athletics
Representing Saint Vincent and the Grenadines
CARIFTA Games Junior (U20)
| Gold medal – first place | 1987 Port of Spain | long jump |

Jacqueline Mattox (nee Ross; born 26 September 1969) is a Vincentian athlete, who was the first female to compete at Summer Olympics for Saint Vincent and the Grenadines, she was the first Vincentian female to win a gold medal at the CARIFTA Games and also the first Vincentian female recipient of an athletics scholarship.

== Career ==
Mattox competed mainly in the long jump and she won a bronze medal at the 1985 CARIFTA Games in the under-17s, two years later she became the first Vincentian female to win a gold medal at the CARIFTA Games winning the long jump in 1987 in Port of Spain, Trinidad and Tobago, later in the year she competed at the 1987 World Championships in Athletics in Rome, Italy, she leaped 5.29 metres and finished 28th out of 29 starters.

The following year Mattox became the first female to compete at the Summer Olympics under the Saint Vincent and the Grenadines flag when they sent their first Olympic team to the 1988 Summer Olympics held in Seoul, South Korea. In here long jump event her first two jumps were fouls and in her final jump she leaped 5.50 metres, but it wasn't far enough for her to reach the final and ended up finishing 26th out of 30 starters.

In 1989 she won her athletics scholarship and went to the University of Idaho, where her success continued, she became a 10 time Big Sky Conference champion and is currently fourth highest point scorer in track and field for the Idaho Vandals and was named Big Sky Conference Outstanding Field Athlete three years running.

== Family ==
Mattox currently resides in Mead, Washington, with her husband and four children, after working as a nurse for eight years, she now works for her husband as a personal administrative assistant.
