= Evelyn Mathieu =

Puerto Rican sprinter

Personal information
- Nationality: Puerto Rican
- Born: 14 October 1965 (age 60)

Sport
- Sport: Sprinting
- Event: 4 × 400 metres relay

Evelyn Mathieu (born 14 October 1965) is a Puerto Rican sprinter. She competed in the women's 4 × 400 metres relay at the 1984 Summer Olympics.
