= Michael Worrell =

Barbadian cricketer (born 1958)

Personal information
- Born: 14 June 1958 (age 68); Saint Peter, Barbados
- Source: Cricinfo, 17 November 2020

Michael Worrell (born 14 June 1958) is a Barbadian cricketer. He played in sixteen first-class and two List A matches for the Barbados cricket team from 1982 to 1987.

== See also ==
- List of Barbadian representative cricketers
