= Donald Burke =

American microbiologist

- Born: Donald S. Burke
- Education: Harvard Medical School; Case Western Reserve University
- Scientific career
- Fields: Microbiology
- Workplaces: University of Pittsburgh

Donald S. Burke is an expert on the prevention, diagnosis, and control of infectious diseases of global concern. He is a distinguished University Professor of Health Science and Policy at the University of Pittsburgh.

== Education ==
- Bachelor of Arts magna cum laude, Western Reserve University, 1967
- Doctorate in Medicine, Harvard Medical School, 1971

== Career ==
Burke is a Distinguished University Professor of Health Science and Policy at the University of Pittsburgh, and dean emeritus of the Graduate School of Public Health. Burke was the longest serving dean in the history of the school (2006–19). He is also the former associate vice chancellor for global health and director of the Center for Vaccine Research.

Burke is one of the world's foremost experts on the prevention, diagnosis, and control of emerging infectious diseases and infectious diseases of global concern, especially HIV/AIDS, Hepatitis A, and avian influenza. His research has spanned a wide range of scientific activities, including development of new diagnostics, field studies, clinical vaccine trials, computational modelling of epidemic control strategies, and health policy analysis.

Before coming to Pittsburgh, Burke was Professor of International Health and Professor of Epidemiology at the Johns Hopkins Bloomberg School of Public Health, and Professor of Medicine at Johns Hopkins School of Medicine. He was previously involved in infectious diseases research for several U.S. government agencies, retiring from the U.S. Army Medical Corps as a Colonel after 23 years of service. He has lectured widely on the history of microbiology and vaccines.

== Selected honors ==
- John Snow Award, American Public Health Association, Epidemiology Section, 2018
- Member, Institute of Medicine of the National Academies of Science, 2009
- UPMC–Jonas Salk Chair in Global Health, University of Pittsburgh, 2006
- Fellow, American Epidemiological Society, 2006
- Fellow, American Association for the Advancement of Science, 2003
- Fellow, American Academy of Microbiology, 2000
- Fellow, Royal Society of Tropical Medicine and Hygiene, U.K.

== Publications ==
Burke is author or coauthor of over 200 scholarly papers. Five of them have been cited more than 1,000 times in other papers, notably "Multifactorial index of cardiac risk in noncardiac surgical procedures", published in 1977 in the New England Journal of Medicine, and cited over 2,800 times since then.

Together with a number of other persons, in 2016 he proposed a World Serum Bank as a means of helping combat epidemics.
