= Ethlyn Tate =

Jamaican sprinter

Personal information
- Nationality: Jamaican
- Born: 13 May 1966 (age 60)

Sport
- Sport: Sprinting
- Event: 4 × 100 metres relay

Ethlyn Tate (born 13 May 1966) is a Jamaican sprinter. She competed in the women's 4 × 100 metres relay at the 1988 Summer Olympics.

Tate competed for the Morgan State Bears track and field team in the NCAA.
