= Laurel Johnson =

Jamaican sprinter

Personal information
- Nationality: Jamaican
- Born: 7 August 1967 (age 58)

Sport
- Sport: Sprinting
- Event: 4 × 100 metres relay

Laurel Johnson (born 7 August 1967) is a Jamaican sprinter. She competed in the women's 4 × 100 metres relay at the 1988 Summer Olympics.
