= Joël Vincent =

Joël Vincent (born 19 January 1969) is a retired French (Martiniquais) high jumper. He won the silver medal at the 1987 European Junior Championships, and the silver medal at the 1989 Jeux de la Francophonie. He also competed at the 1996 European Indoor Championships without reaching the final.

Vincent became French champion in 1989, 1991 and 1992. His personal best was 2.29 metres, achieved in June 1992 in Pau.
