= Laverne Bryan =

Antigua and Barbuda middle-distance runner

Personal information
- Nationality: Antigua and Barbuda
- Born: 17 May 1965 (age 60)

Sport
- Sport: Middle-distance running
- Event(s): 800m, 1500m

Laverne Bryan (born 17 May 1965) is an athlete from Antigua and Barbuda. She competed in both the 800 metres and the 1500 metres at the 1984 Summer Olympics and the 1988 Summer Olympics. She was the first woman to represent Antigua and Barbuda at the Olympics.
