= Yolande Straughn =

Barbadian sprinter (born 1968)

Personal information
- Nationality: Barbadian
- Born: 18 March 1968 (age 57)

Sport
- Sport: Sprinting
- Event: 200 metres

Yolande Straughn (born 18 March 1968) is a Barbadian sprinter. She competed in the women's 200 metres at the 1988 Summer Olympics.
