= 1991 IAAF World Indoor Championships – Men's high jump =

The men's high jump event at the 1991 IAAF World Indoor Championships was held on 9 and 10 March.

== Medalists ==
Gold	Silver	Bronze
Hollis Conway; United States	Artur Partyka; Poland	Javier Sotomayor; Cuba; Aleksey Yemelin; Soviet Union

== Results ==
=== Qualification ===
Qualification: 2.24 (Q) or at least 12 best performers (q) qualified for the final.

Rank	Name	Nationality	2.10	2.15	2.20	2.24	Result	Notes
1	Hollis Conway	United States					2.24	Q
1	Tim Forsyth	Australia					2.24	Q
1	Marino Drake	Cuba					2.24	Q
1	Javier Sotomayor	Cuba					2.24	Q
1	Artur Partyka	Poland					2.24	Q
1	Sorin Matei	Romania					2.24	Q
1	Arturo Ortiz	Spain	–	o	o	o	2.24	Q
1	Aleksey Yemelin	Soviet Union					2.24	Q
1	Stevan Zorić	Yugoslavia					2.24	Q
10	Dragutin Topić	Yugoslavia					2.24	Q
10	Georgi Dakov	Bulgaria					2.24	Q
12	Troy Kemp	Bahamas					2.24	Q
12	Patrik Sjöberg	Sweden					2.24	Q
14	Charles Austin	United States					2.24	Q
15	Ian Garrett	Australia					2.24	Q
16	Gustavo Adolfo Becker	Spain	–	o	o	xxx	2.20	
17	Takahisa Yoshida	Japan					2.20	
18	Geoff Parsons	Great Britain					2.15	
19	Steve Smith	Great Britain					2.15	
20	Sergii Dymchenko	Soviet Union					2.10	

=== Final ===
Rank	Name	Nationality	2.15	2.20	2.24	2.28	2.31	2.34	2.37	2.40	2.42	2.44	Result	Notes
1st place, gold medalist(s)	Hollis Conway	United States	–	–	xo	–	o	o	o	xo	–	xxx	2.40	NR
2nd place, silver medalist(s)	Artur Partyka	Poland	–	–	o	–	o	o	o	xx–	x		2.37	=NR
3rd place, bronze medalist(s)	Javier Sotomayor	Cuba	–	–	o	–	o	xxx					2.31	
3rd place, bronze medalist(s)	Aleksey Yemelin	Soviet Union											2.31	
5	Stevan Zorić	Yugoslavia	–	xo	o	o	x						2.31	PB
6	Charles Austin	United States											2.31	
6	Sorin Matei	Romania	–	o	o	xxo	xo	xxx					2.31	
8	Tim Forsyth	Australia											2.28	=AR
9	Arturo Ortiz	Spain	o	–	xxo	xo	xxx						2.28	
10	Marino Drake	Cuba											2.28	
11	Georgi Dakov	Bulgaria											2.24	
11	Dragutin Topić	Yugoslavia	–	o	o	xxx							2.24	
13	Patrik Sjöberg	Sweden				–	x						2.24	
14	Troy Kemp	Bahamas											2.20	
15	Ian Garrett	Australia											2.20	
