= Athletics at the 1991 Summer Universiade – Men's high jump =

The men's high jump event at the 1991 Summer Universiade was held at the Don Valley Stadium in Sheffield on 24 and 25 July 1991.

== Medalists ==
Gold	Silver	Bronze
Hollis Conway; United States	Arturo Ortiz; Spain	Yuriy Sergiyenko; Soviet Union

== Results ==
=== Qualification ===
Rank	Athlete	Nationality	Result	Notes
1	Lee Jin-taek	South Korea	2.17	q
2	Charles Austin	United States	2.14	q
2	Sergey Dymchenko	Soviet Union	2.14	q
2	Petar Malešev	Yugoslavia	2.14	q
2	Arturo Ortiz	Spain	2.14	q
2	Hollis Conway	United States	2.14	q
7	Cory Siermachesky	Canada	2.14	q
8	Steinar Hoen	Norway	2.14	q
9	Geoff Parsons	Great Britain	2.14	q
9	Xu Yang	China	2.14	q
9	Daniele Pagani	Italy	2.14	q
12	Benő Bese	Hungary	2.14	q
12	Yuriy Sergiyenko	Soviet Union	2.14	q
12	Péter Deutsch	Hungary	2.14	q
15	Pierre Bernhard	France	2.11	
16	Liao Hsueh-sung	Chinese Taipei	2.08	
17	Khemraj Naïko	Mauritius	2.05	
	Ian Garrett	Australia	NM	

=== Final ===
Rank	Athlete	Nationality	2.15	2.20	2.25	2.31	2.34	2.37	2.41	Result	Notes
1st place, gold medalist(s)	Hollis Conway	United States	–	o	xo	o	o	xxo	xxx	2.37	
2nd place, silver medalist(s)	Arturo Ortiz	Spain								2.31	
3rd place, bronze medalist(s)	Yuriy Sergiyenko	Soviet Union								2.25	
4	Sergey Dymchenko	Soviet Union								2.25	
5	Cory Siermachesky	Canada								2.20	
5	Geoff Parsons	Great Britain	o	o	xxx					2.20	
5	Daniele Pagani	Italy								2.20	
5	Xu Yang	China								2.20	
9	Steinar Hoen	Norway								2.20	
10	Charles Austin	United States								2.20	
10	Petar Malešev	Yugoslavia								2.20	
12	Benő Bese	Hungary								2.15	
12	Lee Jin-taek	South Korea								2.15	
14	Péter Deutsch	Hungary								2.15	
