= 1992 European Athletics Indoor Championships – Men's high jump =

1992 Mens Athletic Indoor Championships

The men's high jump event at the 1992 European Athletics Indoor Championships was held in Palasport di Genova on 28 February.

== Results ==
Rank	Name	Nationality	Result	Notes
1st place, gold medalist(s)	Patrik Sjöberg	Sweden	2.38	
2nd place, silver medalist(s)	Sorin Matei	Romania	2.36	
3rd place, bronze medalist(s)	Dragutin Topić	Yugoslavia	2.29	
3rd place, bronze medalist(s)	Ralf Sonn	Germany	2.29	
5	Aleksey Yemelin	Unified Team	2.29	
6	Georgi Dakov	Bulgaria	2.29	
7	Arturo Ortiz	Spain	2.26	
7	Rolandas Verkys	Lithuania	2.26	
9	Steinar Hoen	Norway	2.23	
10	Brendan Reilly	Great Britain	2.20	
10	Stevan Zorić	Yugoslavia	2.20	
12	Luca Toso	Italy	2.20	
12	Gustavo Adolfo Becker	Spain	2.20	
14	Robert Marinov	Bulgaria	2.20	
15	Wolf-Hendrik Beyer	Germany	2.15	
15	Labros Papakostas	Greece	2.15	
17	Antonio Pazzaglia	San Marino	2.05	
18	Lluis Oroná	Andorra	2.05	
	Normunds Sietiņš	Latvia	NM	
	Carlo Thränhardt	Germany	DNS	
