= 1991 World Championships in Athletics – Men's high jump =

These are the official results of the Men's High Jump event at the 1991 IAAF World Championships in Tokyo, Japan. There were a total number of 40 participating athletes, with two qualifying groups and the final held on Sunday September 1, 1991.

== Schedule ==
- All times are Japan Standard Time (UTC+9)

Qualification Round
| Group A | Group B |
|---|---|
| 30.08.1991 – 16:40h | 30.08.1991 – 16:40h |
Final Round
01.09.1991 – 15:00h

== Results ==
=== Qualifying round ===
Qualification rule: 2.30 (Q) or the 12 best results (q) qualified for the final.

| Rank | Group | Name | Nationality | 1.90 | 2.00 | 2.05 | 2.10 | 2.15 | 2.20 | 2.24 | 2.27 | Result | Notes |
|---|---|---|---|---|---|---|---|---|---|---|---|---|---|
| 1 | A | Charles Austin | United States | | | | | | | | | 2.27 | q |
| 1 | A | Dalton Grant | United Kingdom | – | – | – | – | – | o | – | o | 2.27 | q |
| 1 | A | Marino Drake | Cuba | | | | | | | | | 2.27 | q |
| 4 | A | Arturo Ortiz | Spain | | | | | | | | | 2.27 | q |
| 5 | A | Dragutin Topić | Yugoslavia | | | | | | | | | 2.27 | q |
| 5 | A | Troy Kemp | Bahamas | | | | | | | | | 2.27 | q |
| 5 | A | Rick Noji | United States | | | | | | | | | 2.27 | q |
| 8 | A | Rudolf Povarnitsyn | Soviet Union | | | | | | | | | 2.27 | q |
| 9 | A | Ian Garrett | Australia | | | | | | | | | 2.24 | |
| 10 | A | Takahisa Yoshida | Japan | | | | | | | | | 2.24 | |
| 11 | A | Róbert Ruffini | Czechoslovakia | | | | | | | | | 2.24 | |
| 12 | A | Georgi Dakov | Bulgaria | | | | | | | | | 2.24 | |
| 13 | A | Håkon Särnblom | Norway | | | | | | | | | 2.20 | |
| 13 | A | Fakhredin Fouad | Jordan | | | | | | | | | 2.20 | |
| 15 | A | Zhou Zhongge | China | | | | | | | | | 2.20 | |
| 16 | A | Steve Smith | Great Britain | – | – | – | o | o | xo | x | | 2.20 | |
| 17 | A | Michael Mikkelsen | Denmark | | | | | | | | | 2.20 | |
| 18 | A | Jarosław Kotewicz | Poland | | | | | | | | | 2.15 | |
| 19 | A | Roger Te Puni | New Zealand | | | | | | | | | 2.15 | |
| | A | Fernando Moreno | Argentina | | | | | | | | | NM | |
| 1 | B | Hollis Conway | United States | | | | | | | | | 2.27 | q |
| 1 | B | Artur Partyka | Poland | | | | | | | | | 2.27 | q |
| 1 | B | Javier Sotomayor | Cuba | | | | | | | | | 2.27 | q |
| 1 | B | Igor Paklin | Soviet Union | | | | | | | | | 2.27 | q |
| 5 | B | Patrik Sjöberg | Sweden | | | | | | | | | 2.27 | q |
| 6 | B | Steinar Hoen | Norway | | | | | | | | | 2.27 | q |
| 7 | B | Juha Isolehto | Finland | | | | | | | | | 2.24 | |
| 8 | B | Gustavo Adolfo Becker | Spain | – | – | – | – | o | xo | o | xxx | 2.24 | |
| 8 | B | Othmane Belfaa | Algeria | | | | | | | | | 2.24 | |
| 8 | B | Sorin Matei | Romania | | | | | | | | | 2.24 | |
| 11 | B | Tim Forsyth | Australia | | | | | | | | | 2.24 | |
| 12 | B | Alex Zaliauskas | Canada | – | – | – | – | o | o | xxo | xxx | 2.24 | |
| 13 | B | Sergey Dymchenko | Soviet Union | | | | | | | | | 2.20 | |
| 14 | B | Xu Yang | China | | | | | | | | | 2.20 | |
| 15 | B | David Anderson | Australia | | | | | | | | | 2.15 | |
| 16 | B | Karl Scatliffe | British Virgin Islands | | | | | | | | | 2.05 | |
| 17 | B | Valery Abugattas | Peru | | | | | | | | | 2.00 | |
| 18 | B | Khalid Ahmed Mousa | Sudan | | | | | | | | | 1.90 | |
| 18 | B | Emanuel Ngadjadoum | Chad | | | | | | | | | 1.90 | |
| | B | Geoff Parsons | Great Britain | | | | | | | | | DNS | |

=== Final ===
| Rank | Name | Nationality | 2.15 | 2.20 | 2.24 | 2.28 | 2.31 | 2.34 | 2.36 | 2.38 | 2.40 | 2.45 | Result | Notes |
|---|---|---|---|---|---|---|---|---|---|---|---|---|---|---|
| 1st place, gold medalist(s) | Charles Austin | United States | – | o | o | – | o | o | – | xo | – | xxx | 2.38 | CR |
| 2nd place, silver medalist(s) | Javier Sotomayor | Cuba | – | – | o | – | o | – | o | – | xr | | 2.36 | |
| 3rd place, bronze medalist(s) | Hollis Conway | United States | – | o | o | – | xo | – | xo | xxx | | | 2.36 | |
| 4 | Dalton Grant | Great Britain | – | – | – | – | o | – | xxo | xxx | | | 2.36 | NR |
| 5 | Marino Drake | Cuba | – | o | – | xo | – | o | xxx | | | | 2.34 | PB |
| 5 | Troy Kemp | Bahamas | – | o | – | o | xo | o | xxx | | | | 2.34 | |
| 7 | Patrik Sjöberg | Sweden | – | – | o | – | xxo | xr | | | | | 2.31 | |
| 8 | Rick Noji | United States | – | o | – | xo | xxx | | | | | | 2.28 | |
| 9 | Dragutin Topić | Yugoslavia | – | xo | o | xo | xxx | | | | | | 2.28 | |
| 10 | Arturo Ortiz | Spain | o | – | o | xx- | x | | | | | | 2.24 | |
| 10 | Igor Paklin | Soviet Union | – | o | o | – | xxx | | | | | | 2.24 | |
| 12 | Artur Partyka | Poland | o | – | xo | – | xxx | | | | | | 2.24 | |
| 13 | Rudolf Povarnitsyn | Soviet Union | – | xo | xo | xx- | x | | | | | | 2.24 | |
| 14 | Steinar Hoen | Norway | xo | xo | xxx | | | | | | | | 2.20 | |

== See also ==
- 1990 Men's European Championships High Jump
- 1992 Men's Olympic High Jump
- 1993 Men's World Championships High Jump
