= Athletics at the 1988 Summer Olympics – Men's high jump =

Men's high jump at the Games of the XXIV Olympiad
- Olympic Stadium (2014)
- Venue: Olympic Stadium
- Date: 25 September
- Competitors: 27 from 18 nations
- Winning height: 2.38 OR

Medalists
1st place, gold medalist(s)		Hennadiy Avdyeyenko; Soviet Union
2nd place, silver medalist(s)		Hollis Conway; United States
3rd place, bronze medalist(s)		Rudolf Povarnitsyn; Soviet Union
3rd place, bronze medalist(s)		Patrik Sjöberg; Sweden

The men's high jump competition at the 1988 Summer Olympics in Seoul, South Korea, had an entry list of 27 competitors from 18 nations, with two qualifying groups (27 jumpers) before the final (16) took place on Sunday September 25, 1988. The maximum number of athletes per nation had been set at 3 since the 1930 Olympic Congress. There were two bronze medals awarded. The event was won by Hennadiy Avdyeyenko of the Soviet Union, the nation's first victory in the men's high jump since 1972 and fourth overall. Hollis Conway's silver returned the United States to the podium after a two-Games absence (boycotted in 1980; best place was fourth in 1984) that had disrupted the American streak of medaling in every Olympic men's high jump. Patrik Sjöberg's bronze made Sweden the fourth nation (and Sjöberg the fifth man) to medal in two consecutive Games, after the United States, the Soviet Union, and France. The other bronze medal went to Rudolf Povarnitsyn of the Soviet Union after the countback could not break the tie for third.

== Background ==
This was the 21st appearance of the event, which is one of 12 athletics events to have been held at every Summer Olympics. The returning finalists from the 1984 Games were gold medalist Dietmar Mögenburg of West Germany, silver medalist Patrik Sjöberg of Sweden, bronze medalist Zhu Jianhua of China, sixth-place finisher Milton Ottey of Canada, and tenth-place finisher Carlo Thränhardt of West Germany. For the third straight Games, a boycott affected the high jump favorites; this time, world record holder Javier Sotomayor of Cuba was unable to compete. Without Sotomayor, it was difficult to select a favorite among the strong field which included five former world record holders. All three of the returning medalists had held the record at some point, as had Soviet team members Rudolf Povarnitsyn and Igor Paklin. The third Soviet, Hennadiy Avdyeyenko, had won the world championship in 1983 before missing the 1984 Games due to the boycott. Sjöberg was the reigning (1987) world champion.

Burkina Faso made its debut in the event. The United States made its 20th appearance, most of any nation, having missed only the boycotted 1980 Games.

== Competition format ==
The competition used the two-round format introduced in 1912. There were two distinct rounds of jumping with results cleared between rounds. Jumpers were eliminated if they had three consecutive failures, whether at a single height or between multiple heights if they attempted to advance before clearing a height.

The qualifying round had the bar set at 2.05 metres, 2.10 metres, 2.15 metres, 2.19 metres, 2.22 metres, 2.25 metres, and 2.28 metres. All jumpers clearing 2.28 metres in the qualifying round advanced to the final. If fewer than 12 jumpers could achieve it, the top 12 (including ties) would advance to the final.

The final had jumps at 2.15 metres, 2.20 metres, 2.25 metres, 2.28 metres, 2.31 metres, 2.34 metres, 2.36 metres, 2.38 metres, and 2.40 metres.

== Records ==
These were the standing world and Olympic records (in metres) prior to the 1988 Summer Olympics.

World record	Javier Sotomayor (CUB)	2.43	Salamanca, Spain	8 September 1988
Olympic record	Gerd Wessig (GDR)	2.36	Moscow, Soviet Union	1 August 1980

All four medalists matched the Olympic record at 2.36 metres before Hennadiy Avdyeyenko broke it at 2.38 metres to win the gold.

== Schedule ==
All times are Korea Standard Time adjusted for daylight savings (UTC+10)

Date	Time	Round
Saturday, 24 September 1988	12:00	Qualifying
Sunday, 25 September 1988	12:10	Final

== Results ==
Key

- o = Height cleared
- x = Height failed
- – = Height passed
- r = Retired
- SB = Season's best
- PB = Personal best
- NR = National record
- AR = Area record
- OR = Olympic record
- WR = World record
- WL = World lead
- NM = No mark
- DNS = Did not start
- DQ = Disqualified

=== Qualifying ===
Qualification: Qualifying Performance 2.28 (Q) or at least 12 best performers (q) advance to the final.

Rank	Group	Athlete	Nation	2.05	2.10	2.15	2.19	2.22	2.25	2.28	Height	Notes
1	A	Dietmar Mögenburg	West Germany	–	–	–	o	–	o	o	2.28	Q
1	A	Igor Paklin	Soviet Union	–	–	–	o	–	o	o	2.28	Q
3	A	Geoff Parsons	Great Britain	–	–	o	–	–	xo	o	2.28	Q
4	A	Clarence Saunders	Bermuda	–	–	–	o	–	xxo	o	2.28	Q
5	A	Dalton Grant	Great Britain	–	–	–	o	–	xo	xo	2.28	Q
5	A	Hollis Conway	United States	–	–	–	o	o	xo	xo	2.28	Q
7	A	Arturo Ortiz	Spain	o	–	o	–	xo	xo	xo	2.28	Q
8	B	Patrik Sjöberg	Sweden	–	–	–	o	o	o	–	2.25	q
9	A	Robert Ruffini	Czechoslovakia	–	–	o	o	xo	o	xxx	2.25	q
9	B	Rudolf Povarnitsyn	Soviet Union	–	–	–	xo	o	o	–	2.25	q
9	B	Brian Stanton	United States	–	–	o	o	xo	o	–	2.25	q
12	B	Hennadiy Avdyeyenko	Soviet Union	–	–	o	–	xxo	o	–	2.25	q
13	B	Carlo Thränhardt	West Germany	–	–	–	o	–	xo	–	2.25	q
13	B	Jim Howard	United States	–	o	o	–	o	xo	–	2.25	q
15	B	Krzysztof Krawczyk	Poland	–	–	o	–	xo	xo	–	2.25	q
16	A	Luca Toso	Italy	–	–	o	xo	–	xxo	xxx	2.25	q
17	B	Milton Ottey	Canada	–	–	–	xo	o	xxx	—N/a	2.22	
18	B	Cho Hyun-wook	South Korea	–	o	o	–	xxo	–	xxx	2.22	
19	B	Brian Marshall	Canada	–	o	xxo	xxo	xxo	xxx	—N/a	2.22	
20	A	Troy Kemp	Bahamas	–	–	o	o	–	–	xxx	2.19	
20	A	Sorin Matei	Romania	–	–	–	o	–	xxx	—N/a	2.19	
20	B	Artur Partyka	Poland	–	o	o	o	xxx	—N/a		2.19	
23	B	Zhu Jianhua	China	–	o	–	xo	xxx	—N/a		2.19	
24	A	Floyd Manderson	Great Britain	o	o	o	xxo	xxx	—N/a		2.19	
25	A	Paul Ngadjadoum	Chad	o	o	o	r	—N/a			2.15	
26	B	Fernando Pastoriza	Argentina	o	o	xxx	—N/a				2.10	
—	B	Cheick Seynou	Burkina Faso	xxx	—N/a						No mark	

=== Final ===
The competition was marked by "passes and tactical maneuvers."

Rank	Athlete	Nation	2.15	2.20	2.25	2.28	2.31	2.34	2.36	2.38	2.40	2.44	Height	Notes
1st place, gold medalist(s)	Hennadiy Avdyeyenko	Soviet Union	–	o	o	–	o	o	o	xo	x–	xx	2.38	OR
2nd place, silver medalist(s)	Hollis Conway	United States	–	xo	xo	o	o	xo	o	xxx	—N/a		2.36	
3rd place, bronze medalist(s)	Rudolf Povarnitsyn	Soviet Union	–	o	o	o	o	o	xo	xxx	—N/a		2.36	
3rd place, bronze medalist(s)	Patrik Sjöberg	Sweden	–	–	o	–	o	–	xo	xxx	—N/a		2.36	
5	Clarence Saunders	Bermuda	–	o	xo	–	x–	o	x–	xx	—N/a		2.34	
6	Dietmar Mögenburg	West Germany	–	–	o	–	xo	xo	x–	xx	—N/a		2.34	
7	Dalton Grant	Great Britain	–	–	o	–	o	xxx	—N/a				2.31	
7	Igor Paklin	Soviet Union	–	o	o	–	o	x–	xx	—N/a			2.31	
7	Carlo Thränhardt	West Germany	–	–	o	–	o	xx–	x	—N/a			2.31	
10	Jim Howard	United States	–	o	o	xo	o	xxx	—N/a				2.31	
11	Brian Stanton	United States	o	–	o	o	xo	xxx	—N/a				2.31	
12	Krzysztof Krawczyk	Poland	–	o	o	xo	xxo	xxx	—N/a				2.31	
13	Luca Toso	Italy	xo	o	o	xxx	—N/a						2.25	
14	Arturo Ortiz	Spain	o	–	xxo	xxx	—N/a						2.25	
15	Robert Ruffini	Czechoslovakia	o	xxo	xxx	—N/a							2.20	
16	Geoff Parsons	Great Britain	o	–	xxx	—N/a							2.15	

== See also ==
- 1986 Men's European Championships High Jump
- 1987 Men's World Championships High Jump
- 1990 Men's European Championships High Jump
- 1991 Men's World Championships High Jump
- 1992 Men's Olympic High Jump
