= Brian Brown (high jumper) =

American track and field athlete and coach

Personal information
- Born: January 9, 1967 (age 59) New Iberia, Louisiana, United States

Sport
- Sport: Track and field
Medal record
Representing United States
Goodwill Games
Bronze medal – third place	1998 Uniondale	High jump

Brian Brown (born January 9, 1967) is an American male former track and field athlete who competed in the high jump. His career best was 2.34 m (7 ft 8 in), set in 1990. He was the national champion at the USA Outdoor Track and Field Championships in 1989 and won the NCAA Indoor Division I title in 1990.

He competed for the United States three times at world level, at the 1989 IAAF World Cup, 1997 IAAF World Indoor Championships and 1999 World Championships in Athletics. Brown was a bronze medalist at the 1998 Goodwill Games.

After his retirement from the sport he turned to coaching and organization, working at Drake University and the University of Missouri, alongside his wife Natasha Kaiser-Brown.

== Career ==
Born in New Iberia, Louisiana, Brown attended New Iberia Senior High School and won the high school state championship in the high jump in 1982 and 1983. He went on to study at Northwestern State University in his home state and, with a frame standing 6 ft 2 1/2 in (189 cm) he was part of the Northwestern State Demons basketball and track teams. He competed in the high jump at NCAA level from 1987 to 1990. He was fifth outdoors in 1987 before taking third at the 1988 NCAA Indoors. He was fifth at the 1989 NCAA Indoors before winning the 1990 NCAA Men's Division I Championship with a career best jump of 2.34 m (7 ft 8 in). He made his international debut in 1989, but failed to record a valid jump at the Universiade in Duisburg.

The 1989 season proved to be the peak of Brown's career. He cleared an outdoor personal record of 2.32 m (7 ft 7 1/4 in) at the 1989 USA Outdoor Track and Field Championships, beating out Hollis Conway. He was also chosen to represent his country at the 1989 IAAF World Cup, where he placed sixth. His performances declined after 1990. He managed fifth at the 1992 United States Olympic Trials, but otherwise failed to make the final at the outdoor national championships. A severe injury to the anterior cruciate ligament in his jumping leg in 1993 paused his career, through he underwent surgery which allowed him to compete again. After a two-year break from competition he returned to better form in 1996, ranking as the sixth best jumper in the nation and placing seventh at the 1996 United States Olympic Trials.

Brown made two world teams for the United States in 1997. He passed 2.31 m (7 ft 6 3/4 in) in Notre Dame, Indiana in February and third place at the USA Indoor Track and Field Championships earned him selection for the 1997 IAAF World Indoor Championships (he was eliminated in the qualifying round there). He cleared 2.31 m again outdoors, this time in Des Moines, Iowa, and was again third place nationally, behind Charles Austin and Randy Jenkins at the 1997 USA Outdoor Track and Field Championships. His was selected for the 1997 World Championships in Athletics as a result, though again he would not progress to the World Championships high jump final. He ranked eleventh in the world on height that year.

One more successful year followed. In 1998 he was runner-up at the USA Indoors, then third at the 1998 USA Outdoor Track and Field Championships, tying with Hollis Conway. He represented the United States at the 1998 Goodwill Games and took the sole international medal of his career – a bronze – behind world record holder Javier Sotomayor and teammate Charles Austin. His best mark of the year was 2.30 m (7 ft 6 1/2 in), which he achieved at the Weltklasse Zürich meet, placed him in the top 25 globally. He tried to continue competing, but after best jumps of 2.25 m (7 ft 4 1/2 in) the 2.15 m (7 ft 1/2 in) in the 1999 and 2000 seasons, he retired from the sport.

He married fellow American track athlete Natasha Kaiser-Brown and the pair worked together as college athletic coach staff at Drake University. Brown was the organiser of the Drake Relays meet for eleven years before leaving in 2016 to be assistant athletic director at the University of Missouri. During his tenure as Drake Relays organiser, he attracted world class level track athletes to compete at the nominally college meet and raised funds through corporate sponsorship with Hy-Vee. Brown earned his masters and doctorate at Missouri, and his daughter Elle Brown attends the college and is a member of the basketball team.

== International competitions ==
Year	Competition	Venue	Position	Event	Notes
1989	Universiade	Duisburg, West Germany	—	High jump	NH
1989	World Cup	Barcelona, Spain	6th	High jump	2.20 m
1997	World Indoor Championships	Paris, France	7th (q)	High jump	2.24 m
1997	World Championships	Athens, Greece	10th (q)	High jump	2.23 m
1998	Goodwill Games	Uniondale, United States	3rd	High jump	2.29 m

== National titles ==
- USA Outdoor Track and Field Championships
  - High jump: 1989

== See also ==
- List of high jump national champions (men)
