= 1994 European Athletics Indoor Championships – Men's high jump =

The men's high jump event at the 1994 European Athletics Indoor Championships was held in Palais Omnisports de Paris-Bercy on 12 and 13 March.

== Medalists ==
Gold	Silver	Bronze
Dalton Grant; Great Britain	Jean-Charles Gicquel; France	Wolf-Hendrik Beyer; Germany

== Results ==
=== Qualification ===
Qualification performance: 2.26 (Q) or at least 12 best performers (q) advanced to the final.

Rank	Athlete	Nationality	Result	Notes
1	Labros Papakostas	Greece	2.26	Q
1	Håkon Särnblom	Norway	2.26	Q
1	Brendan Reilly	Great Britain	2.26	Q
1	Oleg Zhukovskiy	Belarus	2.26	Q
5	Wolf-Hendrik Beyer	Germany	2.23	q
5	Jean-Charles Gicquel	France	2.23	q
5	Dalton Grant	Great Britain	2.23	q
5	Steinar Hoen	Norway	2.23	q
5	Kristofer Lamos	Germany	2.23	q
5	Thorsten Marschner	Germany	2.23	q
5	Eugen-Cristian Popescu	Romania	2.23	q
5	Leonid Pumalainen	Russia	2.23	q
13	Ettore Ceresoli	Italy	2.23	
13	Georgi Dakov	Bulgaria	2.23	
13	Grigoriy Fyodorkov	Russia	2.23	
13	Stevan Zorić	Independent European Participants	2.23	
17	Roberto Ferrari	Italy	2.20	
17	Mark Mandy	Ireland	2.20	
17	Pierre Bernhard	France	2.20	
20	Matti Viitala	Finland	2.15	
20	Jordi Rofes	Spain	2.15	
20	Róbert Ruffíni	Slovakia	2.15	
23	Ruslan Stipanov	Ukraine	2.10	
	Juha Isolehto	Finland	NM	

=== Final ===
Rank	Name	Nationality	2.15	2.20	2.23	2.26	2.29	2.31	2.33	2.35	2.37	2.39	2.41	Result	Notes
1st place, gold medalist(s)	Dalton Grant	Great Britain	–	–	o	–	–	xx–	o	x–	xo	–	xxx	2.37	
2nd place, silver medalist(s)	Jean-Charles Gicquel	France	–	o	–	xo	–	o	o	xo	xx–	x		2.35	NR
3rd place, bronze medalist(s)	Wolf-Hendrik Beyer	Germany	o	o	xo	o	o	o	xxo	xxx				2.33	
4	Steinar Hoen	Norway	–	o	–	o	o	o	xxx					2.31	
5	Leonid Pumalainen	Russia	o	o	–	o	o	xo	xxx					2.31	
6	Håkon Särnblom	Norway	–	o	–	o	o	x–	xx					2.29	
7	Brendan Reilly	Great Britain	–	o	–	xxo	xxx							2.26	
8	Thorsten Marschner	Germany	o	xo	xo	xxo	xxx							2.26	
9	Kristofer Lamos	Germany	o	o	xo	xxx								2.23	
9	Labros Papakostas	Greece	o	o	xo	xxx								2.23	
11	Eugen-Cristian Popescu	Romania	xo	o	xxx									2.20	
12	Oleg Zhukovskiy	Belarus	o	xxx										2.15	
