= Ralf Sonn =

German high jumper

Ralf Sonn (born 17 January 1967 in Weinheim) is a retired German high jumper.

His personal best, achieved during the indoor season in March 1991 in Berlin, was 2.39 metres. Only five athletes (Sotomayor, Thränhardt, Sjöberg, Conway and Holm) have jumped higher on the indoor track. His outdoor PB was 2.34 metres, achieved at the World Championships in Stuttgart.

== Competition record ==
Year	Competition	Venue	Position	Notes
Representing West Germany
1989	European Indoor Championships	The Hague, Netherlands	4th	2.27 m
1990	European Indoor Championships	Glasgow, United Kingdom	7th	2.24 m
1990	European Championships	Split, Yugoslavia	7th	2.28 m
Representing Germany
1992	European Indoor Championships	Genoa, Italy	3rd	2.29 m
1992	Olympic Games	Barcelona, Spain	6th	2.31 m
1993	World Championships	Stuttgart, Germany	4th	2.34 m
1994	European Championships	Helsinki, Finland	12th	2.25 m
1995	World Indoor Championships	Barcelona, Spain	5th	2.28 m
1995	World Championships	Gothenburg, Sweden	30th (q)	2.20 m
