= Athletics at the 1989 Summer Universiade – Men's high jump =

Event at the 1989 Summer Universiade

The men's high jump event at the 1989 Summer Universiade was held at the Wedaustadion in Duisburg on 29 and 30 August 1989.

== Medalists ==
Gold	Silver	Bronze
Javier Sotomayor; Cuba	Hollis Conway; United States	Rudolf Povarnitsyn; Soviet Union

== Results ==
=== Qualification ===
Rank	Group	Athlete	Nationality	Result	Notes
1	A	Javier Sotomayor	Cuba	2.20	Q
2	A	Igor Paklin	Soviet Union	2.20	Q
3	A	Róbert Ruffíni	Czechoslovakia	2.20	Q
4	A	Jean-Charles Gicquel	France	2.20	Q
5	A	Othmane Belfaa	Algeria	2.15	q
5	A	Marc Howard	Australia	2.15	q
5	A	Luca Toso	Italy	2.15	q
8	A	Brian Brown	United States	2.15	q
9	A	Péter Deutsch	Hungary	2.15	q
9	A	Kosmas Mikhalopoulos	Greece	2.15	q
11	A	Brian Marshall	Canada	2.10	
11	A	Cory Siermachesky	Canada	2.10	
13	A	Takawira Mubako	Zimbabwe	2.00	
1	B	Rudolf Povarnitsyn	Soviet Union	2.20	Q
1	B	Cho Hyun-ok	South Korea	2.20	Q
3	B	Hollis Conway	United States	2.20	Q
4	B	Geoff Parsons	Great Britain	2.20	Q
5	B	Artur Partyka	Poland	2.20	Q
6	B	Matti Viitala	Finland	2.15	q
6	B	Timo Ruuskanen	Finland	2.15	q
6	B	Gustavo Adolfo Becker	Spain	2.15	q
9	B	Bernhard Bensch	West Germany	2.10	
9	B	Lambros Papakostas	Greece	2.10	
9	B	Esteves Costa	Portugal	2.10	
12	B	Boubacar Guèye	Senegal	2.00	

=== Final ===
Held on 30 August

Rank	Athlete	Nationality	Result	Notes
1st place, gold medalist(s)	Javier Sotomayor	Cuba	2.34	
2nd place, silver medalist(s)	Hollis Conway	United States	2.31	
3rd place, bronze medalist(s)	Rudolf Povarnitsyn	Soviet Union	2.31	
4	Geoff Parsons	Great Britain	2.28	
5	Artur Partyka	Poland	2.25	
6	Matti Viitala	Finland	2.20	
6	Igor Paklin	Soviet Union	2.20	
8	Gustavo Adolfo Becker	Spain	2.20	
8	Jean-Charles Gicquel	France	2.20	
10	Róbert Ruffíni	Czechoslovakia	2.20	
11	Luca Toso	Italy	2.20	
12	Péter Deutsch	Hungary	2.15	
13	Timo Ruuskanen	Finland	2.15	
14	Marc Howard	Australia	2.15	
15	Othmane Belfaa	Algeria	2.10	
16	Kosmas Mikhalopoulos	Greece	2.10	
	Brian Brown	United States	NM	
	Cho Hyun-ok	South Korea	NM	
