= Athletics at the 1982 Commonwealth Games – Men's high jump =

Men's high jump at the Commonwealth Games

The men's high jump event at the 1982 Commonwealth Games was held on 7 October at the QE II Stadium in Brisbane, Australia.

== Results ==
| Rank | Name | Nationality | 2.28 | 2.31 | 2.36 | Result | Notes |
|---|---|---|---|---|---|---|---|
| 1st place, gold medalist(s) | Milton Ottey | Canada | xo | o | xxx | 2.31 | GR |
| 2nd place, silver medalist(s) | Steve Wray | Bahamas | xo | xxo | xxx | 2.31 | =GR |
| 3rd place, bronze medalist(s) | Clarence Saunders | Bermuda | | | | 2.19 | |
| 4 | David Abrahams | England | | | | 2.19 | |
| 5 | Greg Joy | Canada | | | | 2.16 | |
| 6 | Alain Metellus | Canada | | | | 2.16 | |
| 7 | Geoff Parsons | Scotland | | | | 2.16 | |
| 8 | Roger Te Puni | New Zealand | | | | 2.13 | |
| 9 | David Anderson | Australia | | | | 2.13 | |
| 10 | Angus Waddell | Australia | | | | 2.10 | |
| 11 | Terry Lomax | New Zealand | | | | 2.10 | |
| 12 | Frans Lisette | Mauritius | | | | 2.05 | |
| 13 | Trevor Llewelyn | Wales | | | | 2.05 | |
| 13 | Édouard Robsen | Vanuatu | | | | 1.95 | |
