= Athletics at the 1991 Pan American Games – Men's high jump =

Men's high jump at the Pan American Games

The men's high jump event at the 1991 Pan American Games was held in Havana, Cuba on 10 August.

== Results ==
Rank	Name	Nationality	1.95	2.00	2.05	2.10	2.15	2.20	2.23	2.26	2.29	2.32	2.35	2.45	Result	Notes
1st place, gold medalist(s)	Javier Sotomayor	Cuba	–	–	–	–	–	–	o	–	xo	–	xo	xxx	2.35	GR
2nd place, silver medalist(s)	Troy Kemp	Bahamas	–	–	–	–	–	o	–	o	–	o	xxx		2.32	
3rd place, bronze medalist(s)	Hollis Conway	United States	–	–	–	–	–	–	xo	–	o	o	xxx		2.32	
4	Marino Drake	Cuba	–	–	–	–	–	o	–	o	o	x–	xx		2.29	
5	Leo Williams	United States	–	–	–	–	xo	xxo	o	xxx					2.23	
6	Vinton Bennett	Canada	–	–	–	–	o	o	–	xxx					2.20	
7	Cory Siermachesky	Canada	–	–	o	o	o	xxx							2.15	
8	Clarence Saunders	Bermuda	–	–	–	–	xo	xxx							2.15	
9	Valery Abugattas	Peru	–	–	o	o	xxx								2.10	
10	Carlos Arzuaga	Puerto Rico	–	–	o	o	xxx								2.10	
11	Gilmar Mayo	Colombia	–	–	o	xo	xx–	x							2.10	
12	Karl Scatliffe	British Virgin Islands	o	o	o	xxx									2.05	
