= Athletics at the 1990 Commonwealth Games – Men's high jump =

Men's high jump at the Commonwealth Games

The men's high jump event at the 1990 Commonwealth Games was held on 1 February at the Mount Smart Stadium in Auckland.

== Results ==
| Rank | Name | Nationality | 1.95 | 2.00 | 2.05 | 2.10 | 2.15 | 2.20 | 2.23 | 2.26 | 2.29 | 2.32 | 2.34 | 2.36 | 2.38 | 2.40 | Result | Notes |
|---|---|---|---|---|---|---|---|---|---|---|---|---|---|---|---|---|---|---|
| 1st place, gold medalist(s) | Nick Saunders | Bermuda | – | – | – | – | – | | o | – | o | – | x– | xo | – | xxx | 2.36 | GR |
| 2nd place, silver medalist(s) | Dalton Grant | England | – | – | – | – | – | xo | xo | o | xx– | o | xo | xx– | x | | 2.34 | |
| 3rd place, bronze medalist(s) | Milton Ottey | Canada | – | – | – | – | – | o | o | xx– | x | | | | | | 2.23 | |
| 3rd place, bronze medalist(s) | Geoff Parsons | Scotland | – | – | – | – | o | – | o | – | xxx | | | | | | 2.23 | |
| 5 | David Anderson | Australia | | | | | | | | | | | | | | | 2.23 | |
| 5 | Alain Metellus | Canada | | | | | | | | | | | | | | | 2.23 | |
| 7 | John Holman | England | | | | | | | | | | | | | | | 2.20 | |
| 8 | Roger Te Puni | New Zealand | | | | | | | | | | | | | | | 2.20 | |
| 9 | Marc Howard | Australia | | | | | | | | | | | | | | | 2.15 | |
| 9 | Ian Garrett | Australia | | | | | | | | | | | | | | | 2.15 | |
| 9 | Stephen Chapman | England | – | – | – | o | o | xxx | | | | | | | | | 2.15 | |
| 12 | Alex Zaliauskas | Canada | | | | | | | | | | | | | | | 2.15 | |
| 13 | Raul Griffith | Guyana | | | | | | | | | | | | | | | 2.05 | |
| 14 | Jeffrey Brown | New Zealand | | | | | | | | | | | | | | | 2.00 | |
| 15 | Stephen Ritchie | Scotland | | | | | | | | | | | | | | | 2.00 | |
| 16 | Roger Brehaut | Guernsey | | | | | | | | | | | | | | | 1.95 | |
