= Marino Drake =

Cuban high jumper

Personal information
- Born: 18 June 1967 (age 59) Limonar, Matanzas, Cuba

Sport
- Sport: Track and field
Medal record
Representing Cuba
Central American and Caribbean Games
Silver medal – second place	1990 Mexico City	High jump
Silver medal – second place	1993 Ponce	High jump
CAC Junior Championships (U20)
Silver medal – second place	1986 Mexico City	High jump

Marino Drake (born 18 June 1967 in ) is a retired Cuban athlete competing in the high jump. He works for North Carolina Central University as the jumps coach.

== Achievements ==
Year	Competition	Venue	Position	Event	Notes
Representing Cuba
1986	Central American and Caribbean; Junior Championships (U-20)	Mexico City, México	2nd	High jump	2.15 m A
1986	World Junior Championships	Athens, Greece	—	High jump	NH
1990	Central American and Caribbean Games	Mexico City, México	2nd	High jump	2.32 m
1991	World Indoor Championships	Seville, Spain	10th	High jump	2.28 m
1991	Pan American Games	Havana, Cuba	4th	High jump	2.29 m
1991	World Championships	Tokyo, Japan	5th	High jump	2.34 m
1992	Ibero-American Championships	Seville, Spain	3rd	High jump	2.24 m
1992	Olympic Games	Barcelona, Spain	8th	High jump	2.28 m
1993	World Indoor Championships	Toronto, Canada	15th (q)	High jump	2.20 m
1993	Central American and Caribbean Games	Ponce, Puerto Rico	2nd	High jump	2.20 m
1993	World Championships	Stuttgart, Germany	13th (q)	High jump	2.20 m
1994	Ibero-American Championships	Mar del Plata, Argentina	2nd	High jump	2.26 m
1995	Central American and Caribbean Championships	Guatemala City, Guatemala	1st	High jump	2.21 m
