= 1992 World Junior Championships in Athletics – Men's high jump =

The men's high jump event at the 1992 World Junior Championships in Athletics was held in Seoul, South Korea, at Olympic Stadium on 18 and 20 September.

== Medalists ==
Gold	Steve Smith; United Kingdom
Silver	Tim Forsyth; Australia
Bronze	Takahiro Kimino; Japan

== Results ==
=== Final ===
20 September

Rank	Name	Nationality	Result	Notes
1st place, gold medalist(s)	Steve Smith	United Kingdom	2.37	=WJR
2nd place, silver medalist(s)	Tim Forsyth	Australia	2.31	
3rd place, bronze medalist(s)	Takahiro Kimino	Japan	2.29	
4	Kim Tae Young	South Korea	2.23	
5	Sergey Klyugin	Commonwealth of Independent States	2.20	
5	Kristofer Lamos	Germany	2.20	
7	Tomáš Janků	Czechoslovakia	2.17	
8	Coenraad Roux	South Africa	2.17	
9	Clayton Pugh	Australia	2.17	
10	Xu Xiaodong	China	2.14	
10	Sven Ootjers	Netherlands	2.14	
12	Mirko Zanotti	Italy	2.14	
13	Clifford van Reed	United States	2.14	
14	Dejan Miloševic	Slovenia	2.10	
15	Hugo Muñoz	Peru	2.10	
16	Stanley Osuide	United Kingdom	2.05	
16	Kostas Liapis	Greece	2.05	
16	Kim Tae-hoi	South Korea	2.05	
19	Antoine Burke	Ireland	2.00	

=== Qualifications ===
18 Sep

==== Group A ====
Rank	Name	Nationality	Result	Notes
1	Tim Forsyth	Australia	2.16	Q
1	Takahiro Kimino	Japan	2.16	Q
3	Xu Xiaodong	China	2.16	Q
3	Clifford van Reed	United States	2.16	Q
5	Sven Ootjers	Netherlands	2.16	Q
6	Stanley Osuide	United Kingdom	2.13	q
6	Kristofer Lamos	Germany	2.13	q
6	Antoine Burke	Ireland	2.13	q
6	Coenraad Roux	South Africa	2.13	q
10	Kim Tae-hoi	South Korea	2.13	q
11	Dejan Miloševic	Slovenia	2.13	q
12	Kostas Liapis	Greece	2.13	q
13	Hugo Muñoz	Peru	2.13	q
14	Giorgio Florindi	Italy	2.05	
15	Oskari Frösén	Finland	2.05	
16	Ignacio Pérez	Spain	2.00	

==== Group B ====
Rank	Name	Nationality	Result	Notes
1	Sergey Klyugin	Commonwealth of Independent States	2.16	Q
1	Steve Smith	United Kingdom	2.16	Q
1	Kim Tae Young	South Korea	2.16	Q
4	Clayton Pugh	Australia	2.16	Q
5	Mirko Zanotti	Italy	2.13	q
5	Tomáš Janků	Czechoslovakia	2.13	q
7	Jochen Schmälzle	Germany	2.10	
7	Olivier Paroz	Switzerland	2.10	
9	Neophytos Kalogerou	Cyprus	2.10	
10	Erik Mueller	United States	2.10	
11	Niki Grundner	Austria	2.10	
12	Enrique Berruezo	Spain	2.10	
13	Erik Nys	Belgium	2.05	
13	Toshihiro Koyama	Japan	2.05	
15	Primoz Moljk	Slovenia	2.05	
16	Andrés Leal	Cuba	2.00	

== Participation ==
According to an unofficial count, 32 athletes from 23 countries participated in the event.

- Australia (2)
- Austria (1)
- Belgium (1)
- China (1)
- Commonwealth of Independent States (1)
- Cuba (1)
- Cyprus (1)
- Czechoslovakia (1)
- Finland (1)
- Germany (2)
- Greece (1)
- Ireland (1)
- Italy (2)
- Japan (2)
- Netherlands (1)
- Peru (1)
- Slovenia (2)
- South Africa (1)
- South Korea (2)
- Spain (2)
- Switzerland (1)
- United Kingdom (2)
- United States (2)
