= 1993 IAAF World Indoor Championships – Men's high jump =

The men's high jump event at the 1993 IAAF World Indoor Championships was held on 13 and 14 March.

== Medalists ==
Gold	Silver	Bronze
Javier Sotomayor; Cuba	Patrik Sjöberg; Sweden	Steve Smith; Great Britain

== Results ==
=== Qualification ===
Qualification: 2.27 (Q) or at least 12 best performers (q) qualified for the final.

Rank	Group	Name	Nationality	Result	Notes
1	A	Dalton Grant	Great Britain	2.27	Q
2	A	Steinar Hoen	Norway	2.27	Q, =NR
3	A	Juha Isolehto	Finland	2.24	
3	A	Alex Zaliauskas	Canada	2.24	
5	A	Gustavo Becker	Spain	2.20	
5	A	Roberto Ferrari	Italy	2.20	
7	A	Lee Jin-taek	South Korea	2.20	NR
8	A	Lou Cwee Peng	Malaysia	2.15	NR
9	A	Takahiro Kimino	Japan	2.15	
	A	Hilaire Onwanlele	Gabon	DNS	
	A	Igor Paklin	Kyrgyzstan	DNS	
	A	Khemraj Naiko	Mauritius	DNS	
1	B	Sorin Matei	Romania	2.27	Q
2	B	Yuriy Sergiyenko	Ukraine	2.27	Q
3	B	Javier Sotomayor	Cuba	2.24	q
3	B	Steve Smith	Great Britain	2.24	q
3	B	Wolf-Hendrik Beyer	Germany	2.24	q
3	B	Charles Austin	United States	2.24	q
3	B	Troy Kemp	Bahamas	2.24	q
3	B	Hollis Conway	United States	2.24	q
3	B	Patrik Sjöberg	Sweden	2.24	q
3	B	Arturo Ortiz	Spain	2.24	q
11	B	Marino Drake	Cuba	2.20	
11	B	Rolandas Verkys	Lithuania	2.20	
	B	Labros Papakostas	Greece	DNS	

=== Final ===
Rank	Name	Nationality	Result	Notes
1st place, gold medalist(s)	Javier Sotomayor	Cuba	2.41	
2nd place, silver medalist(s)	Patrik Sjöberg	Sweden	2.39	
3rd place, bronze medalist(s)	Steve Smith	Great Britain	2.37	NR
4	Dalton Grant	Great Britain	2.34	
4	Troy Kemp	Bahamas	2.34	=NR
6	Yuriy Sergiyenko	Ukraine	2.31	
7	Wolf-Hendrik Beyer	Germany	2.31	
8	Hollis Conway	United States	2.24	
9	Charles Austin	United States	2.24	
9	Steinar Hoen	Norway	2.24	
9	Sorin Matei	Romania	2.24	
12	Arturo Ortiz	Spain	2.24	
