= Athletics at the 1986 Commonwealth Games – Men's high jump =

Men's high jump at the Commonwealth Games

The men's high jump event at the 1986 Commonwealth Games was held on 31 July at the Meadowbank Stadium in Edinburgh.

== Results ==
Rank	Name	Nationality	2.05	2.10	2.14	2.18	2.21	2.24	2.26	2.28	2.30	2.32	2.34	Result	Notes
1st place, gold medalist(s)	Milt Ottey	Canada	–	–	o	–	o	x–	o	xo	o	x–	x	2.30	
2nd place, silver medalist(s)	Geoff Parsons	Scotland	–	o	o	o	o	o	o	xo	x–	xx		2.28	
3rd place, bronze medalist(s)	Alain Metellus	Canada	–	xxo										2.14	
3rd place, bronze medalist(s)	Henderson Pierre	England												2.14	
5	Floyd Manderson	Northern Ireland												2.14	
6	Nat Crooks	Canada												2.10	
7	Dalton Grant	England												2.10	
8	Fayyaz Ahmed	England	xo	xo	xxx									2.10	
9	John Atkinson	Australia												2.05	
	Édouard Robsen	Vanuatu												NM	
