= 1990 European Athletics Indoor Championships – Men's high jump =

The men's high jump event at the 1990 European Athletics Indoor Championships was held in Kelvin Hall on 4 March.

== Results ==
| Rank | Name | Nationality | 2.00 | 2.05 | 2.10 | 2.15 | 2.20 | 2.24 | 2.27 | 2.30 | 2.33 | Result | Notes |
|---|---|---|---|---|---|---|---|---|---|---|---|---|---|
| 1st place, gold medalist(s) | Artur Partyka | Poland | – | – | – | o | o | o | xo | xxo | xxo | 2.33 | |
| 2nd place, silver medalist(s) | Arturo Ortiz | Spain | | | | | | | | | | 2.30 | |
| 3rd place, bronze medalist(s) | Gerd Nagel | West Germany | | | | | | | | | | 2.30 | |
| 3rd place, bronze medalist(s) | Dietmar Mögenburg | West Germany | – | – | – | – | o | o | – | xxo | | 2.30 | |
| 5 | Georgi Dakov | Bulgaria | | | | | | | | | | 2.27 | |
| 6 | Michael Mikkelsen | Denmark | | | | | | | | | | 2.27 | NR |
| 7 | Dalton Grant | Great Britain | – | – | – | – | o | o | – | xxx | | 2.24 | |
| 7 | Ralf Sonn | West Germany | | | | | | | | | | 2.24 | |
| 9 | Rudolf Povarnitsyn | Soviet Union | | | | | | | | | | 2.24 | |
| 10 | Róbert Ruffíni | Czechoslovakia | | | | | | | | | | 2.24 | |
| 11 | Zdeněk Kubista | Czechoslovakia | | | | | | | | | | 2.20 | |
| 11 | Péter Deutsch | Hungary | | | | | | | | | | 2.20 | |
| 11 | Gustavo Adolfo Becker | Spain | | | | | | | | | | 2.20 | |
| 14 | Håkon Särnblom | Norway | | | | | | | | | | 2.20 | |
| 15 | Cengiz Akalan | Turkey | | | | | | | | | | 2.10 | |
| 16 | John Holman | Great Britain | | | | | | | | | | 2.05 | |
| | Sorin Matei | Romania | | | | | | | | | | NM | |
