= Milton Ottey =

Canadian high jumper (born 1959)

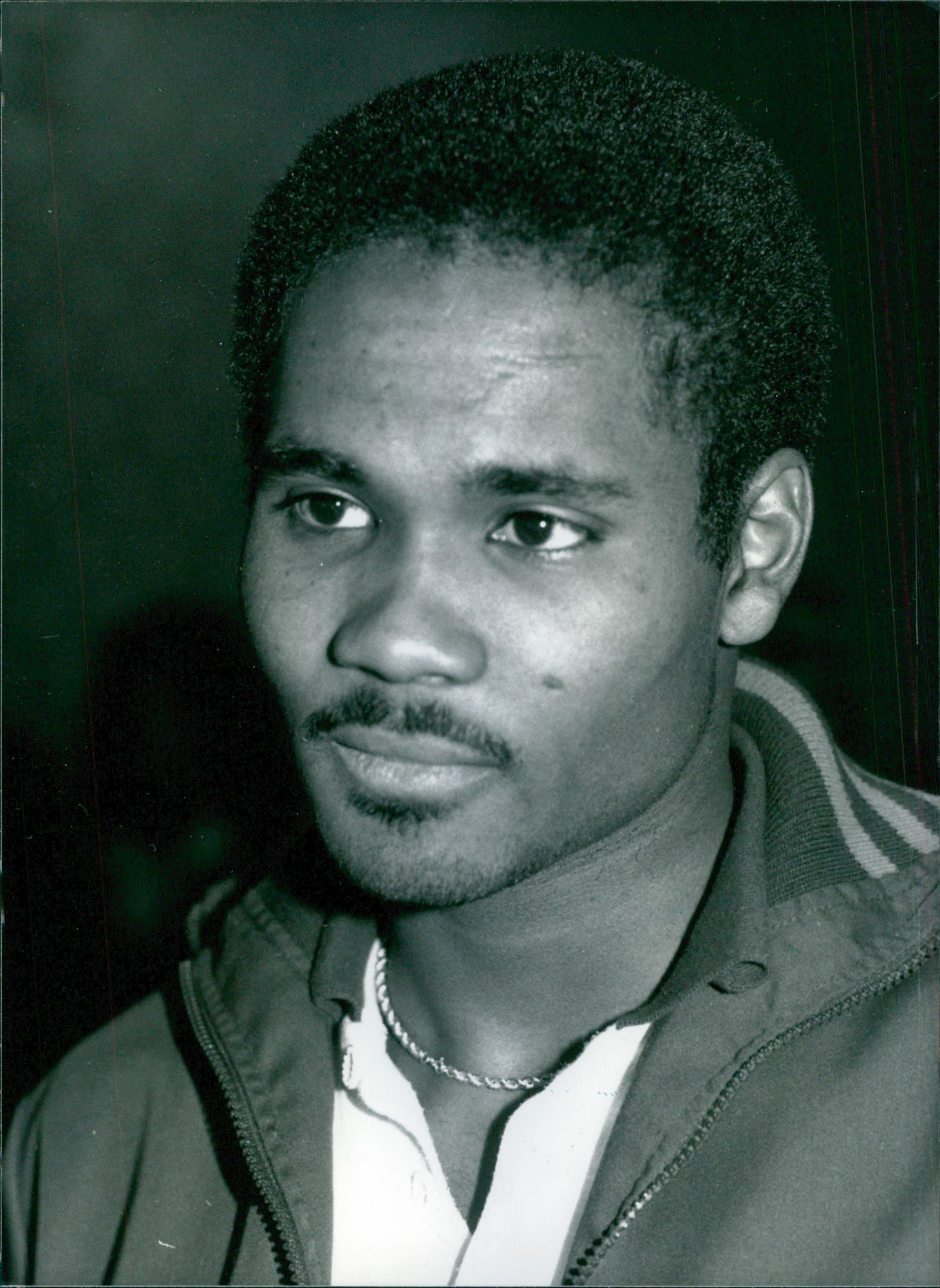

Personal information
- Nationality: Canadian
- Born: December 29, 1959 (age 66) May Pen, Clarendon Parish, Jamaica
- Height: 178 cm (5 ft 10 in)
- Weight: 66 kg (146 lb)

Sport
- Sport: Athletics
- Event: High jump
- Club: York Optimists/Toronto/Transamerica Life TC
Medal record
Men's athletics
Representing Canada
Commonwealth Games
Gold medal – first place	1982 Brisbane	High jump
Gold medal – first place	1986 Edinburgh	High jump

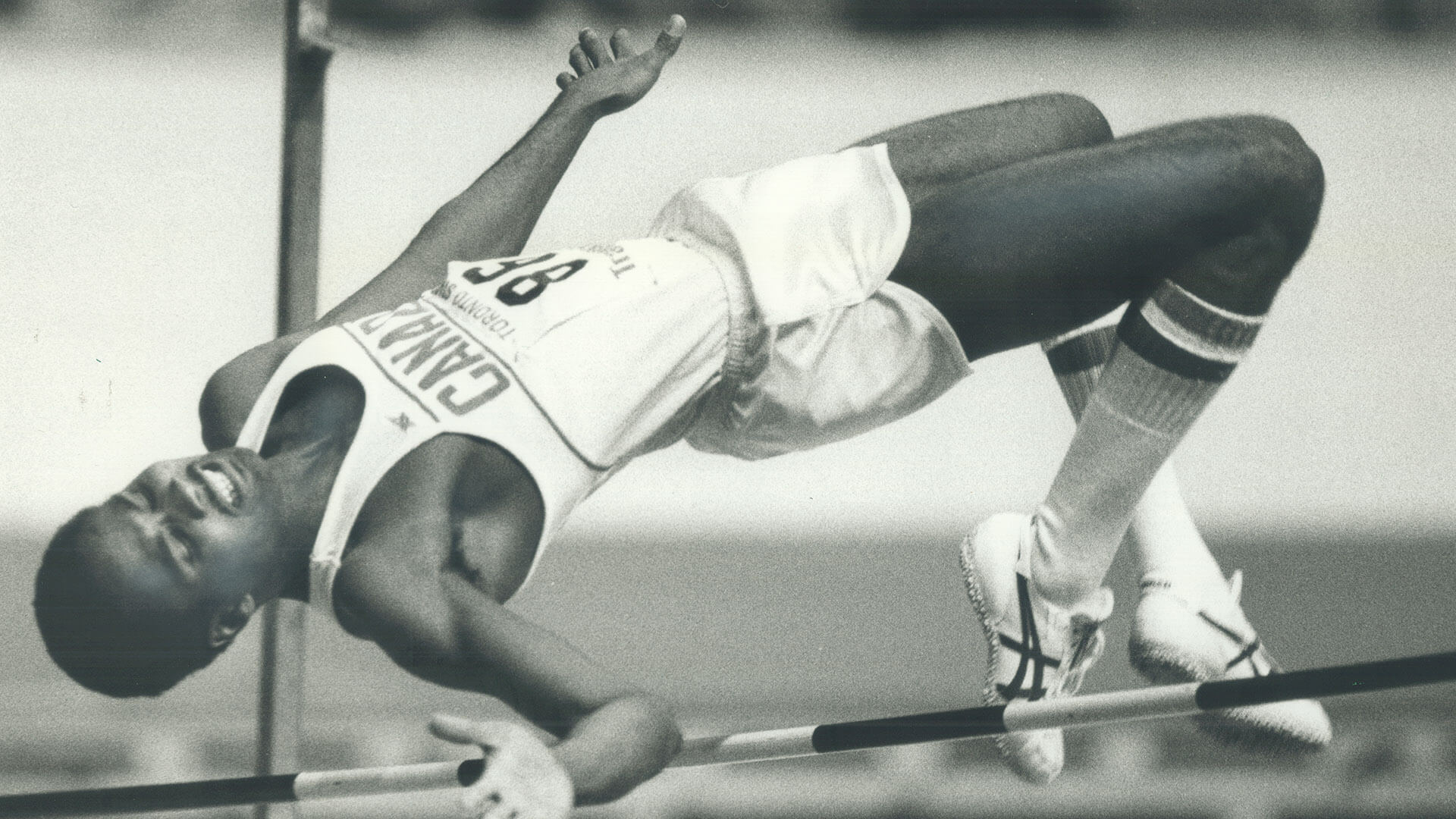

Milton Bruce Ottey (born December 29, 1959) is a retired Canadian high jumper who competed at the 1984 Summer Olympics and the 1988 Summer Olympics and won two Commonwealth Games gold medals.

== Biography ==
Ottey came to Canada at around the age of 7. He attended and graduated from high school in the Toronto District School Board (TDSB). He received a full athletic scholarship from the University of Texas at El Paso (UTEP), where he received his bachelor's degree in education.

He was the number-one-ranked high jumper in the world in 1982 and a 23-time indoor and outdoor national champion in the men's high jump event. In between his two Olympic appearances, Ottey won the British AAA Championships title in the high jump event at the 1985 AAA Championships.

After retiring from active competition, Ottey spent several years coaching at various universities throughout the United States, including University of Texas at El Paso, Kent State University and University of New Mexico before moving back to Toronto, Ontario. Ottey is the owner and director OT Fitness Educational Services, inc. Ottey took over the reins of the UK kids core skills development program International Fun and Team Athletics (IFTA) in Canada. OT Fitness provide programs in schools that promote health and fitness to assist in the core skills development of children and teens. OT Fitness looks at the obstacles to a healthy lifestyle and helps kids jump over them, crawl under them, run around them and tackle them head on. Ottey resides in Scarbough with his wife and three children. He is a cousin of nine-time Olympic medallist Merlene Ottey.

Ottey was inducted into the Athletics Canada Hall of Fame in 2012. These days, the 59-year-old owns and operates OT Fitness, a company that runs health and wellness programs for school-age kids.

Ottey is currently an assistant track coach specializing in jumps at York University.

== Achievements ==
- 7-Time Canadian National High Jump Champion (1981–84, 1986–88)
- Won the NCAA & US National titles in 1982.

Year	Competition	Venue	Position	Event	Notes
Representing Canada
1979	Pan American Games	San Juan, Puerto Rico	3rd	High jump	2.19 m
1979	World Cup	Montreal, Quebec, Canada	5th	High jump	2.10 m^{1}
1981	World Cup	Rome, Italy	5th	High jump	2.15 m^{1}
1982	Commonwealth Games	Brisbane, Australia	1st	High jump	2.31 m
1983	Universiade	Edmonton, Canada	15th	High jump	2.20 m
1983	World Championships	Helsinki, Finland	9th	High jump	2.24 m
1984	Olympic Games	Los Angeles, United States	6th	High jump	2.29 m
1985	Universiade	Kobe, Japan	4th	High jump	2.26 m
1986	Commonwealth Games	Edinburgh, Scotland	1st	High jump	2.30 m
1987	World Indoor Championships	Indianapolis, United States	7th	High jump	2.28 m
1988	Olympic Games	Seoul, South Korea	17th (q)	High jump	2.22 m
1990	Commonwealth Games	Auckland, New Zealand	3rd	High jump	2.23 m

^{1}Representing the Americas

Note: Results with a q, indicate overall position in qualifying round.
