= Troy Kemp =

Bahamian high jumper

Personal information
- Born: March 18, 1966 (age 60) Nassau, Bahamas

Sport
- Sport: Track and field
Medal record
Representing Bahamas
World Championships
Gold medal – first place	1995 Gothenburg	High jump
Pan American Games
Silver medal – second place	1987 Indianapolis	High jump
Silver medal – second place	1991 Havanna	High jump

Troy Kemp (born March 18, 1966) is a former high jumper from the Bahamas who won the gold medal at the 1995 World Championships in Athletics. His personal best was 2.38m in Nice 1995.

He attended Boise State University where he was an All-American. He was inducted into the Boise State Hall of Fame in 1996.

== International competitions ==
Representing the Bahamas
Year	Competition	Venue	Position	Event	Notes
1981	CARIFTA Games (U-17)	Nassau, Bahamas	3rd	High jump	1.88 m
1982	CARIFTA Games (U-17)	Kingston, Jamaica	1st	High jump	1.88 m
1982	Central American and Caribbean; Junior Championships (U-17)	Bridgetown, Barbados	2nd	High jump	1.82 m
1982	Central American and Caribbean; Junior Championships (U-17)	Bridgetown, Barbados	3rd	Pole vault	2.64 m
1983	CARIFTA Games (U-17)	Fort-de-France, Martinique	2nd	High jump	1.86 m
1983	CARIFTA Games (U-17)	Fort-de-France, Martinique	2nd	Javelin throw	44.64 m
1984	CARIFTA Games (U-20)	Nassau, Bahamas	2nd	High jump	2.11 m
1984	Central American and Caribbean; Junior Championships (U-20)	San Juan, Puerto Rico	1st	High jump	2.12 m
1985	CARIFTA Games (U-20)	Bridgetown, Barbados	1st	High jump	2.13 m
1986	Central American and Caribbean Games	Santiago, Dominican Republic	4th	High jump	2.18 m
1987	Pan American Games	Indianapolis, United States	2nd	High jump	2.28 m
1988	Olympic Games	Seoul, South Korea	20th (q)	High jump	2.19 m
1989	World Indoor Championships	Budapest, Hungary	13th	High jump	2.25 m
1989	Central American and Caribbean Championships	San Juan, Puerto Rico	2nd	High jump	2.26 m
1991	World Indoor Championships	Seville, Spain	14th	High jump	2.20 m
1991	Pan American Games	Havana, Cuba	2nd	High jump	2.32 m
1991	World Championships	Tokyo, Japan	5th	High jump	2.34 m
1992	Olympic Games	Barcelona, Spain	7th	High jump	2.31 m
1993	World Indoor Championships	Toronto, Canada	4th	High jump	2.34 m
1993	World Championships	Stuttgart, Germany	5th	High jump	2.34 m
1995	World Championships	Gothenburg, Sweden	1st	High jump	2.37 m
1996	Olympic Games	Atlanta, United States	13th	High jump	2.25 m
1998	Goodwill Games	Uniondale, United States	5th	High jump	2.25 m
