= Wolf-Hendrik Beyer =

German high jumper

Personal information
- Born: 14 February 1972 (age 54) Düsseldorf, West Germany
- Height: 2.00 m (6 ft 7 in)
- Weight: 82 kg (181 lb)

Sport
- Sport: Athletics
- Event: High jump
- Club: Bayer Leverkusen

Wolf-Hendrik Paul Beyer (born 14 February 1972, in Düsseldorf) is a retired German athlete who specialised in the high jump. He represented his country at the 1992 Summer Olympics as well as two outdoor and one indoor World Championships. In addition, he won the bronze medal at the 1994 European Indoor Championships. He Beyer retired in 1996 although he made a brief comeback in 2006.

His personal bests in the event are 2.28 metres outdoors (Rome 1994) and 2.38 metres indoors (Weinheim 1994).

== Competition record ==
Year	Competition	Venue	Position	Notes
Representing West Germany
1990	World Junior Championships	Plovdiv, Bulgaria	4th	2.23 m
Representing Germany
1992	European Indoor Championships	Genoa, Italy	15th	2.15 m
1992	Olympic Games	Barcelona, Spain	25th (q)	2.20 m
1993	World Indoor Championships	Toronto, Canada	7th	2.31 m
1993	World Championships	Stuttgart, Germany	13th (q)	2.25 m
1994	European Indoor Championships	Paris, France	3rd	2.33 m
1995	World Championships	Gothenburg, Sweden	17th (q)	2.24 m
