= Hugo Muñoz =

Peruvian high jumper (born 1973)

Personal information
- Full name: Hugo Muñoz Llerena
- Born: January 10, 1973 (age 53)

Sport
- Country: Peru
- Sport: Men's Athletics

Achievements and titles
- Olympic finals: 1996 Summer Olympics; 2000 Summer Olympics
Medal record
Athletics
Representing Peru
South American Games
Silver medal – second place	1990 Lima	High jump
Silver medal – second place	1994 Valencia	High jump
Bolivarian Games
Silver medal – second place	1993 Cochabamba	High jump

Hugo Muñoz Llerena (born 10 January 1973) is a retired Peruvian high jumper. He competed in the 1996 (Atlanta) and 2000 (Sydney) Olympic Games as a member of the Peru National Team without reaching the finals.

== Career ==
He won the gold medal at the 1993 South American Championships. He also competed at the 1993 World Championships, the 1996 Olympic Games and the 2000 Olympic Games without reaching the final.

His personal best jump is 2.30 meters, achieved in October 1995 in Lima.

== Achievements ==
Year	Competition	Venue	Position	Notes
Representing Peru
1990	South American Games	Lima, Peru	2nd	2.12 m
1991	South American Junior Championships	Asunción, Paraguay	3rd	2.02 m
1991	South American Championships	Manaus, Brazil	4th	2.11 m
1992	Ibero-American Championships	Seville, Spain	6th	2.14 m
1992	South American Junior Championships	Lima, Peru	1st	2.06 m
1992	World Junior Championships	Seoul, South Korea	15th	2.10 m
1993	Bolivarian Games	Cochabamba, Bolivia	2nd	2.15 m A
1993	South American Championships	Lima, Peru	1st	2.22 m
1993	World Championships	Stuttgart, Germany	33rd (q)	2.10 m
1994	Ibero-American Championships	Mar del Plata, Argentina	4th	2.20 m
1994	South American Games	Valencia, Venezuela	2nd	2.14 m
1995	Pan American Games	Mar del Plata, Argentina	–	NM
1995	South American Championships	Manaus, Brazil	4th	2.15 m
1996	Olympic Games	Atlanta, United States	–	NM
2000	Ibero-American Championships	Rio de Janeiro, Brazil	–	NM
2000	Olympic Games	Sydney, Australia	–	NM
