= Stevan Zorić =

Serbian high jumper

Personal information
- Born: 25 May 1971 (age 55) Novi Sad, Yugoslavia

Sport
- Sport: Track and field
Medal record
Representing Yugoslavia
Mediterranean Games
Gold medal – first place	1997 Bari	High jump
Universiade
Silver medal – second place	1993 Buffalo	High jump
World Junior Championships
Bronze medal – third place	1990 Plovdiv	High jump
European Junior Championships
Silver medal – second place	1989 Varaždin	High jump

Stevan Zorić (born 25 May 1971) is a Serbian former high jumper who competed in the 1992 Summer Olympics, in the 1996 Summer Olympics, and in the 2000 Summer Olympics. He is a bronze medalist from 1990 World Junior Championships in Athletics.

== Competition record ==
Year	Competition	Venue	Position	Notes
Representing Yugoslavia
1989	European Junior Championships	Varaždin, Yugoslavia	2nd	2.22 m
1990	World Junior Championships	Plovdiv, Bulgaria	3rd	2.26 m
1990	European Championships	Split, Yugoslavia	16th (q)	2.20 m
1991	World Indoor Championships	Seville, Spain	5th	2.31 m
1992	European Indoor Championships	Genoa, Italy	13th (q)	2.23 m
Representing (International Olympic Committee) Independent Olympic Participants
1992	Olympic Games	Barcelona, Spain	29th (q)	2.15 m
Representing FR Yugoslavia
1993	Universiade	Buffalo, United States	2nd	2.30 m
1994	European Indoor Championships	Paris, France	13th (q)	2.23 m
1994	European Championships	Helsinki, Finland	11th	2.25 m
1995	World Indoor Championships	Barcelona, Spain	6th	2.28 m
1996	European Indoor Championships	Stockholm, Sweden	9th	2.20 m
1996	Olympic Games	Atlanta, United States	27th (q)	2.15 m
1997	Mediterranean Games	Bari, Italy	1st	2.28 m
1997	World Championships	Athens, Greece	15th (q)	2.23 m
2000	Olympic Games	Sydney, Australia	27th (q)	2.15 m
