= Arturo Ortiz (high jumper) =

Spanish high jumper (born 1966)

Personal information
- Born: September 18, 1966 (age 59) Geneva, Switzerland
- Home town: Madrid, Spain

Sport
- Sport: Track and field
Medal record
Representing Spain
Summer Universiade
| Silver medal – second place | 1991 Sheffield | High jump |
| Bronze medal – third place | 1993 Buffalo | High jump |
European Indoor Championships
| Silver medal – second place | 1990 Glasgow | High jump |
Mediterranean Games
| Silver medal – second place | 1997 Bari | High jump |

Arturo Ortiz Santos (born September 18, 1966) is a retired Spanish high jumper.

His personal best jump was 2.34 metres, achieved in June 1991 in Barcelona. This is also the current Spanish record.

== Achievements ==
| Year | Competition | Venue | Position | Notes |
Representing Spain
| 1987 | European Indoor Championships | Liévin, France | 12th | 2.15 m |
| 1987 | World Championships | Rome, Italy | 12th | 2.25 m |
| 1988 | Olympic Games | Seoul, South Korea | 14th | 2.25 m |
| 1990 | European Indoor Championships | Glasgow, United Kingdom | 2nd | 2.30 m |
| 1990 | European Championships | Split, Yugoslavia | 8th | 2.28 m |
| 1990 | Ibero-American Championships | Manaus, Brazil | 1st | 2.21 m |
| 1991 | World Indoor Championships | Seville, Spain | 9th | 2.28 m |
| 1991 | Universiade | Sheffield, United Kingdom | 2nd | 2.31 m |
| 1991 | World Championships | Tokyo, Japan | 10th | 2.24 m |
| 1992 | European Indoor Championships | Genoa, Italy | 7th | 2.26 m |
| 1992 | Olympic Games | Barcelona, Spain | 27th | 2.15 m |
| 1993 | World Indoor Championships | Toronto, Ontario, Canada | 12th | 2.24 m |
| 1993 | Universiade | Buffalo, United States | 3rd | 2.27 m |
| 1993 | World Championships | Stuttgart, Germany | 7th | 2.31 m |
| 1996 | European Indoor Championships | Stockholm, Sweden | 6th | 2.27 m |
| 1996 | Olympic Games | Atlanta, United States | 18th | 2.28 m |
| 1997 | World Indoor Championships | Paris, France | 11th | 2.25 m |
| 1997 | Mediterranean Games | Bari, Italy | 2nd | 2.26 m |
