= Athletics at the 1987 Pan American Games – Men's high jump =

Men's high jump at the Pan American Games

The men's high jump event at the 1987 Pan American Games was held in Indianapolis, United States on 12 August.

== Results ==
Rank	Name	Nationality	Result	Notes
1st place, gold medalist(s)	Javier Sotomayor	Cuba	2.32	GR
2nd place, silver medalist(s)	Troy Kemp	Bahamas	2.28	
3rd place, bronze medalist(s)	Jerome Carter	United States	2.28	
4	Lee Balkin	United States	2.24	
5	Clarence Saunders	Bermuda	2.20	
6	Troy Glasgow	Bermuda	2.10	
	Fernando Pastoriza	Argentina	NM	
