= Marcello Benvenuti =

Italian high jumper

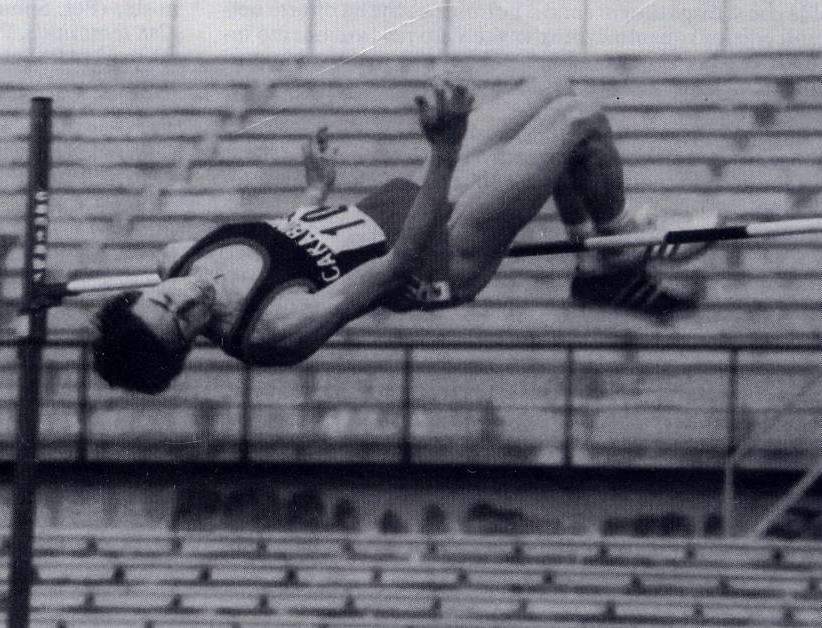
- Benvenuti in action

Personal information
- Nationality: Italian
- Born: April 26, 1964 (age 62) Ferrara, Italy
- Height: 1.78 m (5 ft 10 in)
- Weight: 62 kg (137 lb)

Sport
- Country: Italy
- Sport: Athletics
- Event: High jump
- Club: C.S. Carabinieri

Achievements and titles
- Personal best: High jump: 2.33 m (1989)
Medal record
World Military Championships
Silver medal – second place	1987 Warendorf	High jump

Marcello Benvenuti (born 26 April 1964) is a retired Italian high jumper.

== Biography ==
He became Italian high jump champion in 1989, rivalling with Luca Toso and Daniele Pagani. He also became indoor champion in 1989. His personal best jump is 2.33 metres, achieved in September 1989 in Verona. This was the Italian record.

== National records ==
- High jump: 2.33 m, (Italy) Verona, 20 September 1989. Record held until 2 August 2015.

== National titles ==
Marcello Benvenuti has won 3 times the individual national championship.

- Italian Athletics Championships
  - High jump: 1989
- Italian Athletics Indoor Championships
  - High jump: 1989, 1992

== See also ==
- Italian records in athletics
- Men's high jump Italian record progression
- Italian all-time top lists - High jump
