= Daniele Pagani =

Italian high jumper

Personal information
- Nationality: Italian
- Born: 11 June 1966 (age 60) Italy

Sport
- Country: Italy
- Sport: Athletics
- Event: High jump

Achievements and titles
- Personal best: High jump: 2.28 m (1990)
Medal record
Mediterranean Games
Bronze medal – third place	1987 Latakia	High jump

Daniele Pagani (born 11 June 1966) is a retired Italian high jumper. He won a medal at senior level, at the International athletics competitions.

== Biography ==
He won the bronze medal at the 1987 Mediterranean Games, finished seventh at the 1988 European Indoor Championships and twelfth at the 1990 European Championships. He became Italian high jump champion in 1987 and 1990, rivalling with Luca Toso and Marcello Benvenuti. He also became indoor champion in 1988.

His personal best jump is 2.28 metres, achieved in the qualifying round of the 1990 European Championships in Split.

== National titles ==
Daniele Pagani has won 3 times the individual national championship.

- 1 win in high jump (1988)
- 2 wins in high jump indoor (1987, 1990)

== See also ==
- High jump winners of Italian Athletics Championships
