= Takahiro Kimino =

Japanese high jumper

Personal information
- Nationality: Japanese
- Born: 19 February 1973 (age 53) Hachiōji, Japan
- Education: Juntendo University
- Height: 1.76 m (5 ft 9 in)
- Weight: 65 kg (143 lb)

Sport
- Country: Japan
- Sport: Track and field
- Event: High jump

Achievements and titles
- Personal best: 2.32 m NUR (Fukuoka 1993)
Medal record
Men's athletics
Representing Japan
World Junior Championships
Bronze medal – third place	1992 Seoul	High jump

Takahiro Kimino (君野 貴弘, Kimino Takahiro; born 19 February 1973 in Hachiōji) is a Japanese retired high jumper. His personal best jump is 2.32 metres, achieved in September 1993 in Fukuoka. This is the former Japanese record and current Japanese university record. He competed at the 1999 World Championships without reaching the final.

== Personal best ==
Event	Height	Competition	Venue	Date	Notes
High jump	2.32 m	Super Track and Field Meet	Fukuoka, Japan	18 September 1993	Former NR; Current NUR

== International competition ==
Year	Competition	Venue	Position	Event	Height
Representing Japan
1992	World Junior Championships	Seoul, South Korea	3rd	High jump	2.29 m NUR
1993	World Indoor Championships	Toronto, Canada	20th (q)	High jump	2.15 m
1998	Asian Championships	Fukuoka, Japan	5th	High jump	2.23 m
1999	World Championships	Seville, Spain	29th (q)	High jump	2.15 m

== National title ==
- Japanese Championships
  - High jump: 2001
