= 1986 World Junior Championships in Athletics – Men's high jump =

The men's high jump event at the 1986 World Junior Championships in Athletics was held in Athens, Greece, at Olympic Stadium on 19 and 20 July.

== Medalists ==
Gold	Javier Sotomayor; Cuba
Silver	Hollis Conway; United States
Bronze	Thomas Müller; East Germany

== Results ==
=== Final ===
20 July

Rank	Name	Nationality	Result	Notes
1st place, gold medalist(s)	Javier Sotomayor	Cuba	2.25	
2nd place, silver medalist(s)	Hollis Conway	United States	2.22	
3rd place, bronze medalist(s)	Thomas Müller	East Germany	2.22	
4	Vyacheslav Galushko	Soviet Union	2.19	
5	Róbert Ruffíni	Czechoslovakia	2.16	
6	Joey Johnson	United States	2.16	
7	Philip Henderson	Australia	2.16	
8	Lámbros Papakóstas	Greece	2.13	
9	Junichi Takemoto	Japan	2.13	
10	Timo Ruuskanen	Finland	2.13	
11	Normunds Sietiņš	Soviet Union	2.10	
12	Patrick Renaud	Canada	2.10	

=== Qualifications ===
19 Jul

==== Group A ====
Rank	Name	Nationality	Result	Notes
1	Junichi Takemoto	Japan	2.15	Q
	Vyacheslav Galushko	Soviet Union	2.15	Q
3	Joey Johnson	United States	2.13	q
4	Plamen Florov	Bulgaria	2.11	
5	Pantelis Papageorgiou	Greece	2.09	
6	Jarosław Kotewicz	Poland	2.06	
7	Patrick O'Donaghue	Canada	2.03	
8	Rachid Lalmi	Algeria	2.00	
	Uwe Bellmann	East Germany	2.00	
	Lou Cwee Peng	Malaysia	2.00	
	José Escalera	Puerto Rico	2.00	
12	Awail Abou Oulya	Egypt	1.95	
	Bruce Butcher	Guyana	1.95	
	Rohit Kateel	India	1.95	
	Johann Ómarsson	Iceland	1.95	
16	Mahmoud Mukhtar	Pakistan	1.90	
	Omran Hafizi Al-Mahmoud	Palestine	1.90	
	Marino Drake	Cuba	NH	

==== Group B ====
Rank	Name	Nationality	Result	Notes
1	Philip Henderson	Australia	2.13	q
	Patrick Renaud	Canada	2.13	q
	Javier Sotomayor	Cuba	2.13	q
	Timo Ruuskanen	Finland	2.13	q
	Thomas Müller	East Germany	2.13	q
	Lámbros Papakóstas	Greece	2.13	q
	Róbert Ruffíni	Czechoslovakia	2.13	q
	Normunds Sietins	Soviet Union	2.13	q
	Hollis Conway	United States	2.13	q
10	Fabrizio Borellini	Italy	2.11	
	Artur Partyka	Poland	2.11	
12	Robert Koch	Austria	2.06	
	Kesavan Sivabalan	Malaysia	2.06	
	Humberto Sarubbi	Paraguay	2.06	
	Nai Hui-Fang	Chinese Taipei	2.06	
16	Dharminder Singh	India	1.85	
17	Fayaka Dumbar	Liberia	1.80	
	Muhammad Azah Alam Manaka	Pakistan	NH	

== Participation ==
According to an unofficial count, 36 athletes from 26 countries participated in the event.

- Algeria (1)
- Australia (1)
- Austria (1)
- Bulgaria (1)
- Canada (2)
- Chinese Taipei (1)
- Cuba (2)
- Czechoslovakia (1)
- East Germany (2)
- Egypt (1)
- Finland (1)
- Greece (2)
- Guyana (1)
- Iceland (1)
- India (2)
- Italy (1)
- Japan (1)
- Liberia (1)
- Malaysia (2)
- Pakistan (2)
- Palestine (1)
- Paraguay (1)
- Poland (2)
- Puerto Rico (1)
- Soviet Union (2)
- United States (2)
