= Matti Viitala =

Finnish high jumper

Personal information
- Born: 26 March 1966 (age 60) Oulu, Finland

Sport
- Sport: Track and field

Matti Tapani Viitala (born 26 March 1966) is a retired Finnish high jumper.

He finished sixth at the 1989 Summer Universiade, competed at the 1990 European Championships and the 1994 European Indoor Championships without reaching the final.

He became Finnish champion in 1990, before a long reign of Juha Isolehto, and Finnish indoor champion in 1986, 1989, 1990, 1992 and 1995.

His personal best jump was 2.25 metres, achieved in August 1990 in Helsinki. He had 2.26 metres indoors, achieved in March 1994 in Växjö.
