= Aimeé García Marrero =

Cuban visual artist (b. 1972)

- Born: 1972 (age 53–54); Limonar, Matanzas, Cuba
- Other names: Aimee Garcia Marrero, Aimeé García
- Education: Escuela Profesional de Artes Plásticas, Instituto Superior de Arte
- Occupation: Visual artist
- Known for: Painting, mixed media art
- Website: Official website

Aimeé García Marrero (born 1972) is a Cuban painter and mixed media artist. She has exhibited her work internationally and has participated in several art biennials. García Marrero lives in Havana.

== Biography ==
Aimeé García Marrero was born in 1972 in Limonar, Matanzas, Cuba. She graduated in 1991 from the Escuela Profesional de Artes Plásticas in Camagüey; followed by study at Instituto Superior de Arte and graduation in 1996.

From April to May 2016, García Marrero displayed public art in Times Square in Manhattan entitled Times of Silence, was displayed as part of Times Square Arts. The work was made up of 6 panels of collaged paper and embroidery thread mounted in display cases.

She has participated in several international biennials including the 57th Venice Biennale in 2017; Havana Biennial in 1995, 2012, and 2015; Cuenca Biennial in 1998; Gwangju Biennale in 1997; and Biennial of Painting of the Caribbean and Central America (Spanish: Bienal de Pintura del Caribe y Centro América) in 1996.

Her work is found in museum collections, including at the Fralin Museum of Art at the University of Virginia; the Pérez Art Museum Miami; the Museo Nacional de Bellas Artes de La Habana (English: National Museum of Fine Arts of Cuba); Arizona State University Art Museum; El Museo del Barrio; Museum of Finest Cuban Arts, Vienna; and Jordan Schnitzer Museum of Art at the University of Oregon.
