= Gustavo Adolfo Becker =

Spanish high jumper (born 1966)

Personal information
- Born: 17 June 1966 (age 60) Barcelona, Spain
- Height: 1.84 m (6 ft 0 in)
- Weight: 70 kg (154 lb)

Sport
- Sport: Athletics
- Event: High jump
- Club: FC Barcelona; Kelme; CN Poblenou; Larios A.A.M.
Medal record
Representing Spain
Mediterranean Games
Silver medal – second place	1993 Narbonne	High jump

Gustavo Adolfo Becker Lasso (born 17 June 1966) is a retired Spanish athlete who specialised in the high jump. He represented his country at three indoor and two outdoor World Championships.

His personal bests in the event are 2.30 metres outdoors (Eberstadt 1992) and 2.28 metres indoors (Oviedo 1991).

== Competition record ==
Year	Competition	Venue	Position	Notes
Representing Spain
1985	European Junior Championships	Cottbus, East Germany	16th (q)	2.05 m
1986	European Indoor Championships	Madrid, Spain	15th	2.10 m
1986	Ibero-American Championships	Havana, Cuba	3rd	2.18 m
1987	European Indoor Championships	Liévin, France	14th	2.15 m
1989	Universiade	Duisburg, West Germany	8th	2.20 m
1989	World Cup	Barcelona, Spain	7th	2.20 m
1990	European Indoor Championships	Glasgow, United Kingdom	11th	2.20 m
1990	Ibero-American Championships	Manaus, Brazil	3rd	2.15 m
1991	World Indoor Championships	Seville, Spain	16th (q)	2.20 m
1991	Mediterranean Games	Athens, Greece	7th	2.20 m
1991	World Championships	Tokyo, Japan	16th (q)	2.24 m
1992	European Indoor Championships	Genoa, Italy	12th	2.20 m
1992	Ibero-American Championships	Seville, Spain	2nd	2.26 m
1992	Olympic Games	Barcelona, Spain	11th	2.28 m
1993	World Indoor Championships	Toronto, Canada	15th (q)	2.20 m
1993	Mediterranean Games	Narbonne, France	2nd	2.23 m
1993	World Championships	Stuttgart, Germany	23rd (q)	2.20 m
1994	European Championships	Helsinki, Finland	25th (q)	2.10 m
1995	World Indoor Championships	Barcelona, Spain	13th (q)	2.20 m
1997	World Indoor Championships	Paris, France	25th (q)	2.15 m
