= Yuriy Sergiyenko =

Ukrainian high jumper

Personal information
- Born: 19 March 1965 (age 61) Starobilsk Raion, Soviet Union

Sport
- Sport: Track and field
Medal record
Representing Soviet Union
IAAF World Cup
Gold medal – first place	1992 Havana	High jump
Summer Universiade
Bronze medal – third place	1991 Sheffield	High jump

Yuriy Makarovich Sergiyenko (Ukrainian: Юрій Макарович Сергієнко; born 19 March 1965) is a Ukrainian former track and field athlete who competed in the high jump. He competed internationally for the Soviet Union, the Unified Team, and finally Ukraine. His personal best of 2.34 m (7 ft 8 in) was set indoors in 1985 and he equalled that mark in 1993.

Sergiyenko was the European Junior champion in 1983 and won the bronze medal at the 1991 Summer Universiade. After representing the Unified Team at the 1992 Summer Olympics, he won the gold medal at the 1992 IAAF World Cup. His final international appearance came at the 1993 IAAF World Indoor Championships. He was a two-time Ukrainian national champion – being the first man to take the high jump title after the country's independence.

== Career ==
Born in Starobilsk Raion in the Ukrainian Soviet Socialist Republic, he was the gold medallist for the Soviet Union at the 1983 European Athletics Junior Championships, winning in a personal best of 2.28 m (7 ft 5 3/4 in). He later set an outdoor best of 2.29 m (7 ft 6 in), jumping in Tashkent in September that year. The best jump of his career came in 1985 at the age of twenty. In Kiev in February he cleared 2.34 m (7 ft 8 in) and later set an outdoor best of 2.31 m (7 ft 6 3/4 in) in Sofia in Bulgaria. He did not compete internationally in the second half of the 1980s but reappeared on the European scene in the 1990 season with a best of 2.31 m (7 ft 6 3/4 in) and followed with a jump of 2.30 m (7 ft 6 1/2 in) in 1991. He won his first and final international medal for the Soviet Union at the 1991 Universiade.

Sergiyenko began competing for Ukraine in the 1992 season, following the dissolution of the Soviet Union. This change marked a resurgence in the athlete's form. He was victorious at the Brothers Znamensky Memorial in an outdoor best-equalling mark of 2.31 m. He became Ukraine's first national champion in the high jump with a clearance of 2.28 m (7 ft 5 3/4 in). He was selected for the Unified Team at the 1992 Summer Olympics, managed only a jump of 2.20 m (7 ft 2 1/2 in) in the qualifiers on his Olympic debut. His first medal senior gold medal followed at the 1992 IAAF World Cup in Havana, where he beat home favourite Javier Sotomayor to the title. He equalled his personal best of 2.34 m at the start of 1993 and won selection for Ukraine for the 1993 IAAF World Indoor Championships and cleared 2.31 m in the final to take sixth place.

The best outdoor performance of his career came in June 1993 in the form of a clearance of 2.32 m (7 ft 7 1/4 in) in Nikopol, Ukraine. This proved to be the last time in his career that the Ukrainian cleared the two metres and thirty centimetres mark. He won his second Ukrainian title in 1994 and was the 1996 Europa SC High Jump winner. Reaching his mid-thirties, the 1998 season was the last in which he jumped over 2.20 m and he retired from athletics in 1999.

== Personal bests ==
- High jump outdoor – 2.32 m (7 ft 7 1/4 in) (1993)
- High jump indoor – 2.34 m (7 ft 8 in) (1985 and 1993)

== National titles ==
- Ukrainian Athletics Championships
  - High jump: 1992, 1994

== International competitions ==
Year	Competition	Venue	Position	Notes
1983	European Junior Championships	Schwechat, Austria	1st	High jump
1991	Universiade	Sheffield, United Kingdom	3rd	High jump
1992	Olympic Games	Barcelona, Spain	24th (qualifiers)	High jump
1992	IAAF World Cup	Havana, Cuba	1st	High jump
1993	World Indoor Championships	Toronto, Canada	6th	High jump

== See also ==
- List of high jump national champions (men)
