= Floyd Manderson =

British athlete (born 1961)

Personal information
- Nationality: British
- Born: 5 March 1961 (age 65) Camberwell, London, England
- Height: 191 cm (6 ft 3 in)
- Weight: 90 kg (198 lb)

Sport
- Sport: Athletics
- Event: High jump
- Club: Striders

Floyd Dwight Manderson (born 5 March 1961) is an English born athlete who represented Northern Ireland and competed for Great Britain at the 1988 Summer Olympics.

== Biography ==
Manderson finished second behind Geoff Parsons in the high jump event at the 1986 AAA Championships. The following year he won the high jump title at the UK Athletics Championships.

At the 1988 Olympic Games in Seoul, he represented Great Britain in the men's high jump.
