= 1990 European Athletics Championships – Men's high jump =

Men's high jump at the European Athletics Championships

These are the official results of the Men's high jump event at the 1990 European Championships in Split, Yugoslavia, held at Stadion Poljud on 29 and 31 August 1990. There were a total number of 24 participating athletes.

== Medalists ==
Gold	Dragutin Topić; Yugoslavia
Silver	Aleksey Yemelin; Soviet Union
Bronze	Georgi Dakov; Bulgaria

== Result ==
=== Qualification ===
Qualification: Qualifying Performance 2.28 (Q) or at least 12 best performers (q) advance to the final.

Rank	Group	Name	Nationality	2.00	2.05	2.10	2.15	2.20	2.24	2.28	Result	Notes
1	A	Aleksey Yemelin	Soviet Union								2.28	Q
2	A	Arturo Ortiz	Spain								2.28	Q
3	A	Georgi Dakov	Bulgaria								2.28	Q
4	A	Dragutin Topić	Yugoslavia	–	o	o	o	xxo	o	o	2.28	Q
5	A	Dietmar Mögenburg	West Germany								2.28	Q
6	A	Luca Toso	Italy								2.24	q
7	A	Matti Viitala	Finland								2.24	
8	A	Geoff Parsons	Great Britain	–	–	–	o	o	xxx		2.20	
9	A	Stevan Zorić	Yugoslavia								2.20	
10	A	Carlo Thränhardt	West Germany								2.20	
11	A	Lambros Papakostas	Greece								2.15	
12	A	Itai Margalit	Israel								2.10	
1	B	Sergey Dymchenko	Soviet Union								2.28	Q
2	B	Ralf Sonn	West Germany								2.28	Q
3	B	Daniele Pagani	Italy								2.28	Q
4	B	Dalton Grant	Great Britain	–	–	–	–	o	xo	xxo	2.28	Q
5	B	Artur Partyka	Poland								2.28	Q
6	B	Juha Isolehto	Finland								2.24	q
7	B	Jean-Charles Gicquel	France								2.24	
8	B	Sašo Apostolovski	Yugoslavia								2.24	
9	B	Michael Mikkelsen	Denmark								2.20	
10	B	Thomas Eriksson	Sweden								2.20	
11	B	Brendan Reilly	Great Britain	–	–	xo	o	xxo	xxx		2.20	
12	B	Håkon Särnblom	Norway								2.15	

=== Final ===
Rank	Name	Nationality	2.10	2.15	2.20	2.24	2.28	2.31	2.34	2.36	2.38	Result	Notes
1st place, gold medalist(s)	Dragutin Topić	Yugoslavia	–	o	o	o	xo	o	o	xx–	x	2.34	
2nd place, silver medalist(s)	Aleksey Yemelin	Soviet Union	–	–	o	xo	xo	xxo	xo	xxx		2.34	
3rd place, bronze medalist(s)	Georgi Dakov	Bulgaria	–	–	xo	o	o	o	xxo	xxx		2.34	
4	Sergey Dymchenko	Soviet Union										2.31	
4	Dalton Grant	Great Britain	–	–	–	o	–	o	x–	xx		2.31	
4	Dietmar Mögenburg	West Germany	–	–	–	–	o	o	xx			2.31	
7	Ralf Sonn	West Germany										2.28	
8	Arturo Ortiz	Spain										2.28	
8	Luca Toso	Italy										2.28	
10	Juha Isolehto	Finland										2.24	
11	Artur Partyka	Poland										2.24	
12	Daniele Pagani	Italy										2.24	

== Participation ==
According to an unofficial count, 24 athletes from 15 countries participated in the event.

- Bulgaria (1)
- Denmark (1)
- Finland (2)
- France (1)
- Greece (1)
- Israel (1)
- Italy (2)
- Norway (1)
- Poland (1)
- Soviet Union (2)
- Spain (1)
- Sweden (1)
- United Kingdom (3)
- West Germany (3)
- Yugoslavia (3)

== See also ==
- 1988 Men's Olympic High Jump (Seoul)
- 1991 Men's World Championships High Jump (Tokyo)
- 1992 Men's Olympic High Jump (Barcelona)
- 1994 Men's European Championships High Jump (Helsinki)
