= Limonar =

- Municipality
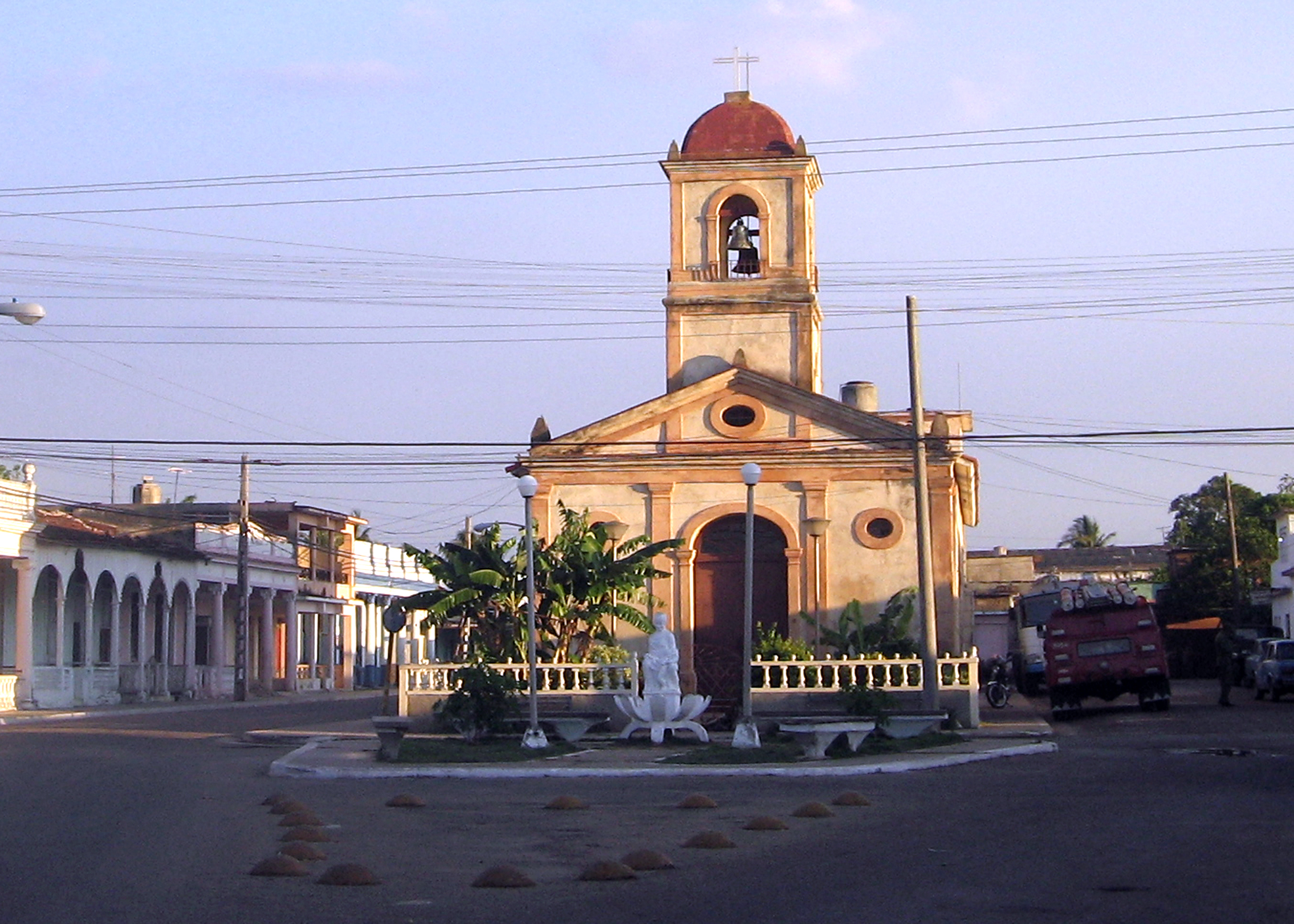
- Main street and town's church

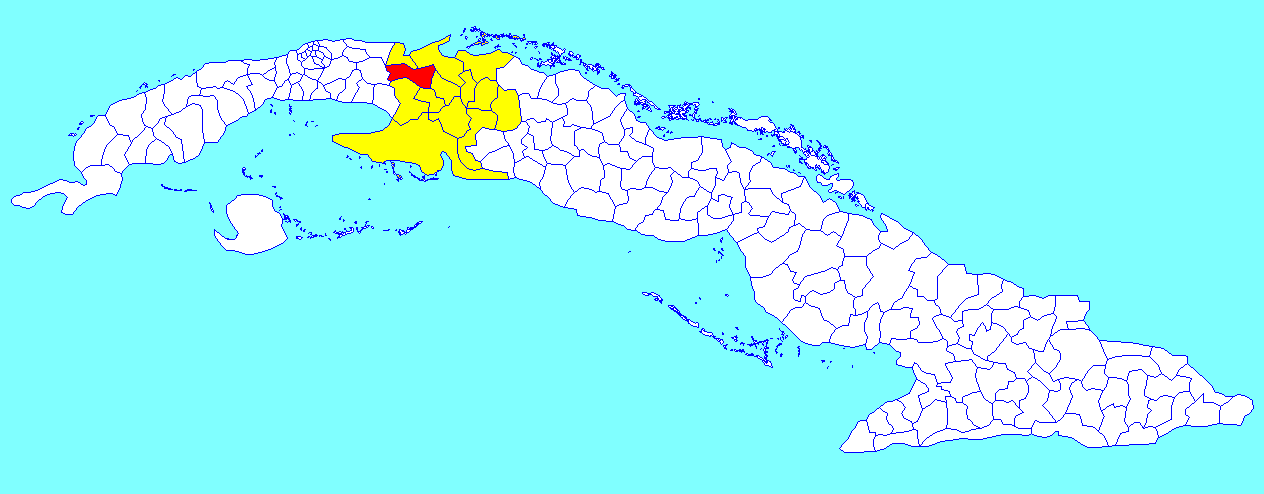
- Limonar municipality (red) within Matanzas Province (yellow) and Cuba
- Coordinates: 22°57′22″N 81°24′31″W
- Country: Cuba
- Province: Matanzas
- Founded: 1876
- Established: 1976

Government
  - President: Lester Baró Escalona

Area
  - Total: 449 km^{2} (173 sq mi)
- Elevation: 5 m (16 ft)

Population (2022)
  - Total: 26,708
  - Density: 59.5/km^{2} (154/sq mi)
- Time zone: UTC-5 (EST)
- Area code: +53-52

Limonar is a municipality and town in the Matanzas Province of Cuba.

== Overview ==
The municipality is divided into the barrios of Canímar, Guamacaro, Caoba, Sumidero, Coliseo, and San Miguel.

Established in 1876 as Guamacaro, the name was changed to Limonar in the 1950s, when it achieved municipality status. Limonar is the hometown of jumper Javier Sotomayor; jumper Marino Drake; fine art painter Aimeé García Marrero; as well as professional baseball player Silvio García.

== Demographics ==
In 2022, the municipality of Limonar had a population of 26,708. With a total area of 449 km^{2} (173 sq mi), it has a population density of 56.6/km^{2} (147/sq mi).

== See also ==
- Municipalities of Cuba
- List of cities in Cuba
