= Aleksey Yemelin =

Soviet high jumper

Medal record

Men's athletics

Representing Soviet Union

European Championships
Silver medal – second place	1990 Split	High jump

Aleksey Mikhailovich Yemelin (Russian: Алексей Михайлович Емелин; born October 16, 1968) is a retired high jumper who represented the USSR and later Russia.

== Major achievements ==
Year	Competition	Venue	Position	Notes
Representing the Soviet Union
1989	European Indoor Championships	The Hague, Netherlands	3rd	2.30 m
1990	European Championships	Split, Yugoslavia	2nd	2.34 m
1991	World Indoor Championships	Seville, Spain	3rd	2.31 m
