= Normunds Sietiņš =

Latvian high jumper

Normunds Sietiņš (born 17 July 1967) is a retired Latvian high jumper.

He finished eleventh at the 1986 World Junior Championships, reached the final but failed to record a mark at the 1992 European Indoor Championships, and competed at the 1994 European Championships without reaching the final.

His personal best is 2.30 metres, achieved in July 1992 in Nurmijärvi. This is the Latvian record.
