= Luca Toso =

Italian high jumper

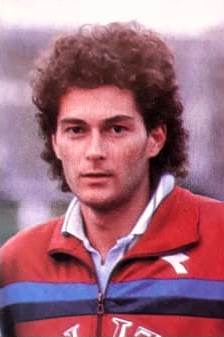

Personal information
- National team: Italy: 20 caps (1983-1992)
- Born: February 15, 1964 (age 62) Tavagnacco, Italy
- Height: 1.90 m (6 ft 3 in)
- Weight: 77 kg (170 lb)

Sport
- Country: Italy
- Sport: Athletics
- Event: High jump
- Club: G.S. Fiamme Oro

Achievements and titles
- Personal best: High jump: 2.32 m (1988)
Medal record
Mediterranean Games
Silver medal – second place	1987 Latakia	High Jump
Silver medal – second place	1991 Athens	High Jump

Luca Toso (born 15 February 1964) is a former Italian high jumper. He won two medals at the International athletics competitions.

== Biography ==
He finished tenth at the 1983 World Championships and the 1985 World Indoor Games, thirteenth at the 1988 Olympic Games and eighth at the 1990 European Championships. At the Mediterranean Games he won silver medals in 1987 and 1991. He also competed at the 1987 World Championships without reaching the final.

Because of these results, Luca Toso was almost always punctual at the major international events in which he participated, hitting the final on five out of six occasions (two world championships, two Europeans and one Olympics), failing to make an appointment only for the 1987 outdoor world championships. In addition to the silver medals at the Mediterranean Games, he also hit the final in two editions of the Universiade (1987 and 1989).

His personal best jump is 2.32 metres, achieved in July 1988 in Turin. This was the Italian record until September 1989, when Marcello Benvenuti broke it by one centimetre.

== National records ==
- High jump: 2.30 m ( (Italy) Padua, 13 June 1988)
- High jump: 2.32 m ( (Italy) Turin, 21 July 1988)

== Achievements ==
Year	Competition	Venue	Rank	Event	Measure	Notes
1983	World Championships	(Finland) Helsinki	10th	High jump	2.26 m	
1985	World Indoor Championships	(France) Paris	10th	High jump	2.21 m	
1988	Olympic Games	(South Korea) Seoul	13th	High jump	2.25 m	
1990	European Championships	(Socialist Federal Republic of Yugoslavia) Split	8th	High jump	2.28 m	
1992	European Indoor Championships	(Italy) Genoa	12th	High jump	2.28 m	

== National titles ==
Luca Toso has won 3 times the individual national championship.

- 2 wins in high jump (1982, 1988)
- 1 win in high jump indoor (1992)

== See also ==
- Men's high jump Italian record progression
- Italian all-time top lists - High jump
