= Kristofer Lamos =

German high jumper

Kristofer Lamos (born 1 January 1974) is a former German high jumper.

He finished in joint ninth place at the 1994 European Indoor Championships, and competed at the 1994 European Championships without reaching the final. Domestically, he won the bronze medal for his club LG Frankfurt at the 1998 German championships, as well as a silver medal at the 2001 German indoor championships.

His personal best was 2.28 metres, achieved in August 1999 in Pfungstadt.
