= David Anderson (high jumper) =

Australian high jumper

Personal information
- Nationality: Australian
- Born: 8 December 1965 (age 60)
- Height: 194 cm (6 ft 4 in)
- Weight: 80 kg (176 lb)

Sport
- Sport: Athletics
- Event: High jump

David Lennon James Anderson (born 8 December 1965) is an Australian former high jumper who competed in the 1992 Summer Olympics.

Anderson finished third behind Steve Smith and fellow Australian Tim Forsyth in the high jump event at the British 1992 AAA Championships.
