= Serhiy Dymchenko =

Ukrainian high jumper

Personal information
- Born: 23 August 1967 (age 59)

Sport
- Sport: Track and field

Serhiy Yevhenovych Dymchenko (born 23 August 1967) is a retired Ukrainian high jumper. His personal best jump is 2.37 metres, achieved in September 1990 in Kyiv.

== Achievements ==
| Year | Competition | Venue | Position | Notes |
Representing the Soviet Union
| 1989 | World Indoor Championships | Budapest, Hungary | 9th | 2.28 m |
| 1990 | European Championships | Split, Yugoslavia | 4th | 2.31 m |
Representing Ukraine
| 2000 | Olympic Games | Sydney, Australia | 9th | 2.29 m |
| 2001 | World Indoor Championships | Lisbon, Portugal | 8th | 2.25 m |
