= Geoff Parsons (athlete) =

Scottish high jumper (born 1964)

Personal information
- Nationality: British
- Born: 14 August 1964 (age 61) Margate, England
- Height: 203 cm (6 ft 8 in)
- Weight: 79 kg (174 lb)

Sport
- Sport: Athletics
- Event: High jump
- Club: London Athletic Club
Medal record
Men's athletics
Representing Scotland
Commonwealth Games
Silver medal – second place	1986 Edinburgh	High jump
Bronze medal – third place	1990 Auckland	High jump
Bronze medal – third place	1994 Victoria	High jump
Representing Great Britain
European Indoor Championships
Bronze medal – third place	1986 Madrid	High jump

Geoffrey Peter Parsons (born 14 August 1964) is an English born high jumper who competed at the 1984 Summer Olympics and the 1988 Summer Olympics and represented Scotland at the Commonwealth Games.

== Biography ==
Parsons represented Scotland at the 1982 Commonwealth Games in Brisbane, Australia, participating in the high jump competition where he finished in 7th place. The following year at the 1983 AAA Championships, Parsons became the British high jump champion despite finishing 5th because he was the highest placed British athlete.

He began to dominate British high jumping and was British champion again in 1984 shortly before he represented Great Britain at the 1984 Olympic Games in Los Angeles. Parsons won the AAA Championships title outright at the 1986 AAA Championships and would successfully defend the title in 1987 and 1988.

Before going to his second Olympics in 1988, Parsons had recorded his best career achievement by claiming a silver medal when representing Scotland in the high jump at the 1986 Commonwealth Games in Edinburgh. His next Olympic appearance ensued where he finished 16th at the 1988 Olympic Games in Seoul.

In addition to his AAA titles, he was three-times UK Athletics Championships champion (1985, 1986 and 1988) and won two bronze medals at consecutive Commonwealth Games in 1990 and 1994.

His personal best jump was 2.31 metres, achieved at the Commonwealth Games in Victoria on the 26 August 1994. He was trained by Ron Murray.

== International competitions ==
Year	Competition	Venue	Position	Notes
Representing Great Britain and Scotland
1982	Commonwealth Games	Brisbane, Australia	7th	2.16 m
1984	European Indoor Championships	Gothenburg, Sweden	15th	2.15 m
1986	European Indoor Championships	Madrid, Spain	3rd	2.28 m
1986	Goodwill Games	Moscow, Soviet Union	8th	2.25 m
1986	Commonwealth Games	Edinburgh, United Kingdom	2nd	2.28 m
1986	European Championships	Stuttgart, West Germany	9th	2.21 m
1987	Universiade	Zagreb, Yugoslavia	6th	2.24 m
1987	World Championships	Rome, Italy	10th	2.25 m
1988	Olympic Games	Seoul, South Korea	16th	2.15 m
1989	Universiade	Duisburg, West Germany	4th	2.28 m
1990	Commonwealth Games	Auckland, New Zealand	3rd	2.23 m
1990	European Championships	Split, Yugoslavia	16th	2.20 m
1991	Universiade	Sheffield, United Kingdom	5th	2.20 m
1994	Commonwealth Games	Victoria, Canada	3rd	2.31 m PB
