= Javier Sotomayor =

Cuban high jumper (born 1967)

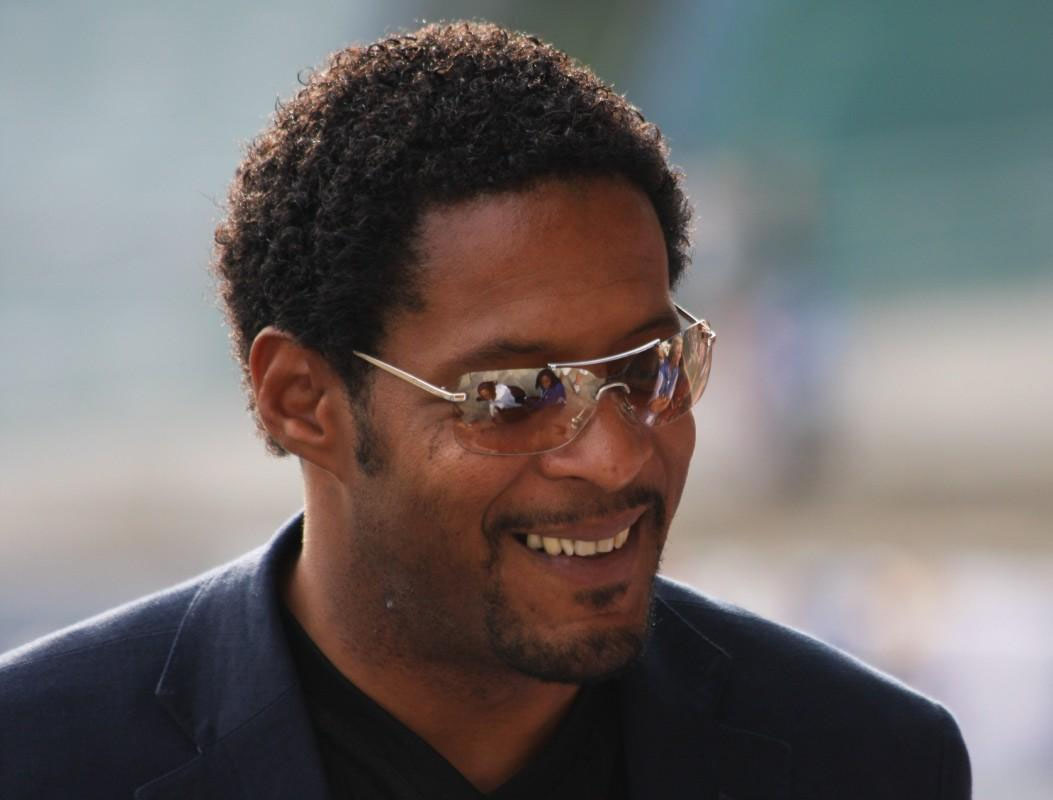
- Sotomayor in 2009

Personal information
- Full name: Javier Sotomayor Sanabria
- Born: 13 October 1967 (age 59) Limonar, Cuba
- Height: 1.93 m (6 ft 4 in)
- Weight: 80 kg (176 lb)

Sport
- Sport: Track and field
- Event: High jump
Medal record
Men's athletics
Representing Cuba
| Event | 1st | 2nd | 3rd |
|---|---|---|---|
| Olympic Games | 1 | 1 | 0 |
| World Championships | 2 | 2 | 0 |
| World Indoor Championships | 4 | 1 | 1 |
| Pan American Games | 3 | 0 | 0 |
| CAC Championships | 2 | 0 | 1 |
| Total | 12 | 4 | 2 |
Olympic Games
| Gold medal – first place | 1992 Barcelona | High jump |
| Silver medal – second place | 2000 Sydney | High jump |
World Championships
| Gold medal – first place | 1993 Stuttgart | High jump |
| Gold medal – first place | 1997 Athens | High jump |
| Silver medal – second place | 1991 Tokyo | High jump |
| Silver medal – second place | 1995 Gothenburg | High jump |
IAAF World Indoor Championships
| Gold medal – first place | 1989 Budapest | High jump |
| Gold medal – first place | 1993 Toronto | High jump |
| Gold medal – first place | 1995 Barcelona | High jump |
| Gold medal – first place | 1999 Maebashi | High jump |
| Silver medal – second place | 1985 Paris | High jump |
| Bronze medal – third place | 1991 Seville | High jump |
Goodwill Games
| Gold medal – first place | 1994 Saint Petersburg | High jump |
| Gold medal – first place | 1998 New York | High jump |
Pan American Games
| Gold medal – first place | 1987 Indianapolis | High jump |
| Gold medal – first place | 1991 Havana | High jump |
| Gold medal – first place | 1995 Mar del Plata | High jump |
Friendship Games
| Silver medal – second place | 1984 Moscow | High jump |
CAC Championships
| Gold medal – first place | 1985 Nassau | High jump |
| Gold medal – first place | 1989 San Juan | High jump |
| Bronze medal – third place | 1983 Havana | High jump |
Universiade
| Gold medal – first place | 1989 Duisburg | High jump |
Pan American Junior Championships
| Gold medal – first place | 1986 Winter Park | High jump |
CAC Junior Championships (U20)
| Gold medal – first place | 1986 Mexico City | High jump |

Javier Sotomayor Sanabria (Spanish pronunciation: [xaˈβjeɾ sotomaˈʝoɾ]; born 13 October 1967) is a Cuban former track and field athlete who specialized in the high jump and is the current world record holder. His world record of 2.45 m (8 ft 1/4 in) and second-highest jump of 2.44 make him the only person ever to have cleared eight feet (2.44 m).

Sotomayor is a two-time gold medalist at the IAAF World Championships in Athletics, and also won two silver medals at the competition. At the IAAF World Indoor Championships he won four gold medals between 1989 and 1999. In addition, he won three straight titles at the Pan American Games from 1987 to 1995, he was stripped for a fourth title in 1999 after testing positive for cocaine. At the Olympics, Cuban boycotts in 1984 and 1988 prevented him from competing, but he won gold in 1992, sat out in 1996 due to injury, and won silver in 2000. He retired in 2001 after testing positive for nandrolone, having avoided a lifetime ban that would normally follow a second positive drug test.

== Personal life ==
Sotomayor was born in Limonar, Matanzas Province on 13 October 1967. The son of a day-care worker and a sugar factory maintenance man, Sotomayor was first sent to a Cuban sports school as a prospective basketball player because of his height. At age 14, coaches made him a high jumper and by 19, he was ranked No. 5 in the world.

Sotomayor is engaged to Amaya González and has four sons. One of his sons, Javier Sotomayor García, has also competed in the high jump.

== Early career ==
=== World junior record in 1984 ===
Sotomayor was only 14 when he first cleared 2 metres and by the end of 1983 he had a best of 2.15 m (7 ft 1/2 in). He then set the junior world record on 19 May 1984 by clearing 2.33 m (7 ft 7 1/2 in) at a meet held in Havana. He was not able to go to Los Angeles for the 1984 Olympics due to the boycott by Cuba (and most communist nations). In 1985 he took silver in the World Indoor Championships in Paris, with a best jump of 2.30 m (7 ft 6 1/2 in) on 19 January, and then improved his personal best two months later outdoors in Havana, with a jump of 2.34 m (7 ft 8 in) on 20 March 1985. He continued to improve the following year with a best jump of 2.36 m (7 ft 8 3/4 in) at a meet in Santiago de Cuba on 23 February 1986. He won his first international title in 1987, at the Pan American Games, and established a new personal best of 2.37 m (7 ft 9 1/4 in) at a meet in Athens, Greece on 20 June 1987.

== Career ==
=== First world record 1988 ===
On 8 September 1988, at a meet held in Salamanca, Spain – just four days before the opening ceremonies of the 1988 Summer Olympics – he set a world record of 2.43 m (7 ft 11 1/2 in). However, Sotomayor was again denied the chance to compete in the Olympics in Seoul due to another Cuban boycott of the Olympics. Sotomayor's leap of 2.43 m (7 ft 11 1/2 in) broke, by one centimeter, the record of 2.42 m (7 ft 11 1/4 in) set the previous summer (30 June 1987) by Sweden's Patrik Sjöberg in Stockholm.

=== Raises record in 1989 and again in 1993 ===
Sotomayor twice increased the world record, to 2.44 m (8 ft 0 in) on 29 July 1989, in the Central American and Caribbean Championships, held in San Juan, Puerto Rico and to the current record of 2.45 m (8 ft 1/4 in) in Salamanca, Spain on 27 July 1993. The July 1989 record of 2.44 m, which he cleared on his second attempt, was a historic jump for Imperial-measure fans, as that was the first jump over 8 feet.

After setting the record at 2.44 m (8 ft 0 in) in July 1989, Sotomayor became inconsistent the following year. He missed much of the 1990 outdoor season after surgery to remove scar tissue in his knee and heel. Competing before an adoring Cuban public at the Pan American Games in Havana on Saturday 10 August 1991, Sotomayor defeated his principal rival, American Hollis Conway, with a jump of 2.35 m (7 ft 8 1/2 in). He then thrilled the crowd by having the bar raised 10 cm to a new world record of 2.45 m (8 ft 1/4 in), but in each of his three attempts he jumped into the bar, striking it with his shoulders on the way up each time. Afterwards he said, "My physical condition is better, but psychologically I am not well prepared."

The 1993 record set at the Salamanca Invitational track meet was remarkable in that Sotomayor required only four jumps: he took his first jump at 2.32 m (7 ft 7 1/4 in), passed at 2.35 m (7 ft 8 1/2 in), cleared 2.38 m (7 ft 9 1/2 in) on his first attempt, then had the bar raised to a record height of 2.45 m (8 ft 1/4 in), which he missed on his first attempt and then succeeded on his second attempt, lightly brushing the bar. Videos of his record-setting leap show his unique, galloping approach with two elongated strides in the middle of his 14-step run, and a powerful left leg take-off as he pumps both of his arms: he begins his approach with three short steps, builds up speed, then takes exaggerated strides on steps 8 and 9, and then re-accelerates over his last five strides.

After setting the record in Salamanca, Sotomayor told reporters, "I wanted to set the record here because it is a small city in which I feel like I am in Cuba. The people recognize me in the street and ask how I'm doing, the children surround me and I find myself in a good mental state."

=== World indoor record in 1989 ===
Sotomayor set the current world indoor record of 2.43 m (7 ft 11 1/2 in) in Budapest on 4 March 1989.

He broke the record during the 1989 IAAF World Indoor Championships, clearing 2.43 m (7 ft 11 1/2 in) on his first attempt (and fifth jump overall). At this competition, Sotomayor was one of four men to clear 2.35 m (7 ft 8 1/2 in), at which point he stood in third place, trailing Dietmar Mögenburg (Germany) and Dalton Grant (Great Britain) who each succeeded on their first attempts, while Sotomayor and Patrik Sjöberg (Sweden) each needed two tries. In Budapest, he took his first jump of the competition at 2.31 m (7 ft 6 3/4 in), passed at 2.33 m (7 ft 7 1/2 in), missed his initial try at 2.35 m (7 ft 8 1/2 in) then cleared on his second attempt; made a huge first attempt clearance at 2.37 m (7 ft 9 1/4 in); passed at 2.39 m (7 ft 10 in); then had the bar raised for a record attempt at 2.43 m (7 ft 11 1/2 in), clearing on his first try, just brushing the bar with the back of his thighs on the way down. Germany's Carlo Thränhardt, who had set the indoor record of 2.42 m (7 ft 11 1/4 in) one year earlier (26 February 1988) in Berlin, finished fifth at Budapest with a jump of 2.33 m (7 ft 7 1/2 in).

=== Olympic champion in 1992 ===
When he was finally able to compete in the Summer Olympics, in 1992, he won the gold medal, and later the silver medal at the 2000 Olympics (after the reversal of a drug suspension for drug usage). Between the Olympic games he won the 1993 and 1997 World Championships.

At the 1992 Barcelona Olympics, Sotomayor won the high jump on the basis of his ability to jump "clean" (no misses) at the highest height. Five men cleared the winning height of 2.34 m (7 ft 8 in), but Sotomayor was the only one to clear the bar on his first attempt. All five competitors then failed at the next height, 2.37 m (7 ft 9 1/4 in). Jumping last in the round, Sotomayor failed on his first two attempts at 2.37 m (7 ft 9 1/4 in). When everyone else missed on their third attempts, Sotomayor was assured of the gold medal and therefore passed up his third attempt, opting for one try at a record height of 2.39 m (7 ft 10 in), which he missed. Sotomayor was declared the victor on the basis of the tie-breaker: Patrik Sjöberg (Sweden) won the silver medal having cleared 2.34 on his second attempt, while Artur Partyka (Poland), Tim Forsyth (Australia) and Hollis Conway (USA) tied for the bronze medal.

=== Indoor and outdoor world champion in 1993 ===
Less than one month after setting the world record of 2.45 m (8 ft 1/4 in) at Salamanca (on 27 July), Sotomayor won the 1993 World Championships held at Stuttgart, Germany on 22 August. He outjumped the competition, establishing a new World Championships record of 2.40 m (7 ft 10 1/4 in): the second-place jumper, Artur Partyka (Poland) jumped 2.37.

The last time he would clear 2.40 m (7 ft 10 1/4 in) was on 25 March 1995 at the Pan American Games in Mar del Plata, Argentina. A healthy Sotomayor attempted to defend his title at the 1995 World Championships, held in Gothenburg, Sweden. He cleared the winning height of 2.37 m (7 ft 9 1/4 in) on 8 August, but finished second to Troy Kemp (Bahamas) on the basis of missed jumps. Partyka finished third, at 2.35.

At the 1997 World Championships in Athens, Greece, Sotomayor again won the gold medal on 6 August, defeating Partyka with a 1997 world-leading jump of 2.37 m (7 ft 9 1/4 in) (on his second attempt), to the Partyka's 2.35 m (7 ft 8 1/2 in) (his best of the season to that date.)

=== 1996 outdoor season ===
Sotomayor had a good start to 1996 during the indoor season, but was plagued by injury during the outdoor season. At the 1996 Summer Olympics he attempted to defend his Olympic title in Atlanta. He qualified for the finals with a jump of 2.28 m (7 ft 5 3/4 in) on Friday, but in the finals on Sunday July 28, he could manage only his opening jump of 2.25 m (7 ft 4 1/2 in), clearing on his first attempt. He then "passed" at the next height 2.29 m (7 ft 6 in), and then failed in all three of his attempts at 2.32 m (7 ft 7 1/4 in). His 2.25 m (7 ft 4 1/2 in) clearance left him in equal 11th position. This was a full 10 cm (3.9 in) short of what was required to medal at Atlanta: American Charles Austin won the gold medal, breaking the Olympic record with a leap of 2.39 m (7 ft 10 in).

Sotomayor underwent treatment for knee and heel injuries after his poor showing in the Atlanta Olympics and skipped the 1997 indoor season. He began training in Puerto Rico in spring 1997 for the outdoor season, but Cuban sports officials announced on 30 May 1997 that although Sotomayor was "in good form", he was withdrawing from the season's first big meet in Toronto and would instead make his season debut the following week at a track meet in France.

=== 1999 Pan American Games ===
Sotomayor won the gold medal at the 1999 Pan American Games, held in Winnipeg. Just a few days after his victory, Games officials announced that his urine test tested positive for an illegal drug, cocaine (a stimulant), and on 4 August he was stripped of his medal and was sent home to Cuba in disgrace. At the time, this was widely regarded as the biggest drug scandal in the sport of track and field in over a decade (since Canadian sprinter Ben Johnson was stripped of his gold medal at the 1988 Seoul Olympics). In 1999 Sotomayor was a national celebrity, a well-known anti-drug crusader and the pride of Cuba's sports system. Mario Granda, Cuba's chief of sports medicine, reacted to the shocking news by saying the 31-year-old Sotomayor had "passed more than 60 drug tests" in his career and suggested that Sotomayor was the victim of sabotage.

=== 2000 Olympics in Sydney ===
Sotomayor was allowed to participate in the 2000 Summer Olympics in Sydney despite his two-year drug suspension from 1999. His suspension was upheld in June 2000, but in August the IAAF cut the penalty in half – effectively to time served – and allowed him to compete at Sydney at the age of 32. The finals of the men's high jump were held on Sunday September 24, in rainy, windy conditions which worsened as the event progressed. The wet surface greatly impacted the results. Seven men cleared 2.32 m (7 ft 7 1/4 in) before the light rain began to worsen, and Russian Sergey Klyugin was the only jumper able to clear the next height, 2.35 m (7 ft 8 1/2 in), doing so before the rain and wind peaked. Sotomayor was awarded silver on the count-back, having taken only two jumps with no misses (at 2.25 m (7 ft 4 1/2 in) and 2.32 m (7 ft 7 1/4 in)): all other competitors had at least one failed attempt. The favorite to win the competition, Vyacheslav Voronin (Russia) managed to clear only 2.29 m (7 ft 6 in) in the rain, after having cleared 2.40 m (7 ft 10 1/4 in) one month before. Another medal favorite, Stefan Holm (Sweden), finished fourth and complained that the IAAF should not have reduced Sotomayor's two-year suspension.

=== Dominating career ===
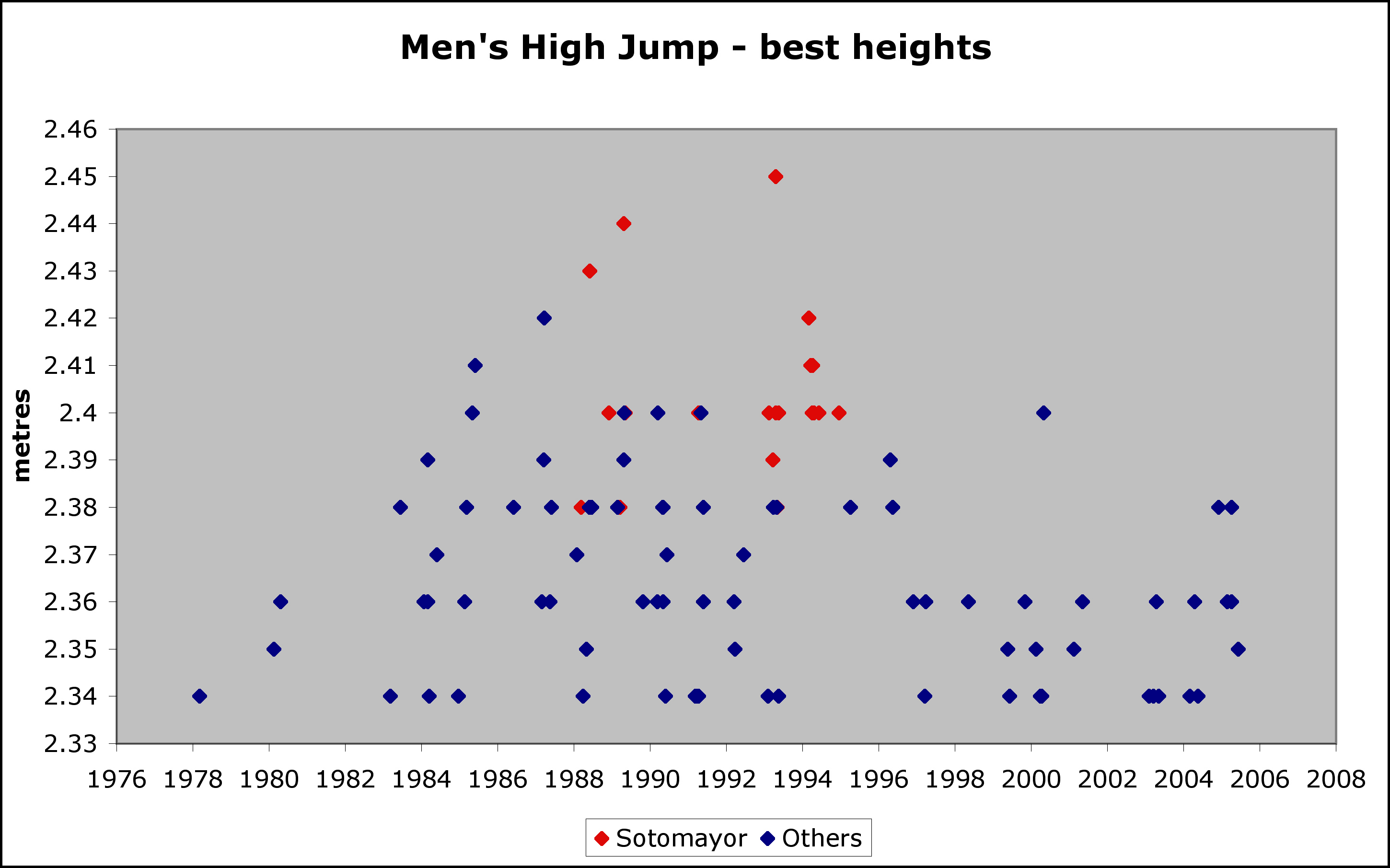
Sotomayor's dominance of all-time best high jumps.

Sotomayor has a rare dominance in the history of this event. At the time he retired, he had 17 of the top 20 jumps of all time. Only 13 men in history have jumped 2.40 metres or higher, and only 5 have done it more than once. Sotomayor did it 24 times (in 21 different competitions between September 1988 – March 1995). He is the only person to have cleared 2.44 m (8 ft 0 in) (which he did twice). Following his world record in September 1993, he had his greatest year in 1994, when he (again) was the only jumper to scale 2.40 metres or better, doing so ten times that year: two during the indoor season in February, and seven times outdoors, starting at Seville on 5 June 1994, where he cleared 2.40 metres before recording the year's best jump of 2.42 m (7 ft 11 1/4 in). Besides dominating the event on the Grand Prix circuit, Sotomayor recorded wins at the Goodwill Games in St Petersburg on 29 July, and at the World Cup in London on 11 September, where his best jump of 2.40 m was a record 12 centimeters above the next-best performance. The last time he would clear 2.40 meters was on March 25, 1995, at the Pan American Games in Mar del Plata, Argentina. Only Bohdan Bondarenko and Mutaz Essa Barshim have jumped higher outdoors since, although four men equaled the mark.

During his career, Sotomayor was ranked by Track & Field News in the "Top 10" in the men's high jump in ten different years, and was ranked #1 eight of those ten years: in 1988, 89, 1992, 93, 94, 95, 97 and 1998. By comparison, the jumper with second-most #1 rankings over a career is Russian Valeriy Brumel in five consecutive years (1961–65). For his career Sotomayor accumulated 123 ranking points, while the jumper with the second-most career points, American Dwight Stones has 90 points and four consecutive #1 rankings (1973–76.)

== Drug tests ==
Sotomayor tested positive for cocaine at the 1999 Pan American Games, which Cuban president Fidel Castro claimed was a set-up by the Cuban-American Mafia. Sotomayor claimed his innocence. After months of hearings, an IAAF arbitration panel upheld the two-year ban on June 27, 2000. The Cuban federation continued to appeal his case, citing a clause in the IAAF rulebook that allows drug bans to be modified under "exceptional circumstances". In a controversial decision announced on August 2, the IAAF shortened the suspension to one year – which had elapsed on July 30 – thereby allowing him to compete in the 2000 Summer Olympics. IAAF's motivation for this action was that Sotomayor had done a great deal for the sport, had passed hundreds of drug tests during his long career, and acted exemplarily throughout. Two weeks after his suspension was lifted, Sotomayor returned to competition at a small track meet in Montauban, France, which he won with a jump of 2.28 m (7 ft 5 3/4 in). Four days later he won a Golden League meet held in Monaco by clearing 2.30 m (7 ft 6 1/2 in). Interviewed on French television immediately after his victory, Sotomayor said: "I was not fantastic today. I was very tired because I have been practicing a lot, and I also have a new baby since July, which is another reason why I'm a little tired. But I should be able to clear 2.36 or 2.37 at the Olympics. I just hope nobody else does 2.40." Sotomayor cleared 2.32 m, good for the silver medal.

=== Retirement ===
In September 2001, Sotomayor announced that he would end his career, following another positive drug test during a training camp in June, this time for the anabolic steroid nandrolone. He avoided a lifetime ban that would normally follow a second positive test. This second test disqualified his fourth-place finish in his last World Championship. Once again, Sotomayor claimed he was innocent and that mistakes had been made during the handling of his doping test, and many in his home country refused to believe the allegations. Former IAAF Vice President and Doping Commission Chairman Arne Ljungqvist asserted that these failed drug tests were both "crystal clear cases" in a Swedish interview.

In a February 2004 interview for Cuban news, Sotomayor said that injury had forced his retirement, not the doping scandal. An Achilles tendon problem hampered his performance, he said, and reduced his run-up from nine steps to seven and then just five.

== Competition record ==
| Year | Competition | Venue | Position | Notes |
Representing Cuba
| 1983 | Central American and Caribbean Championships | Havana, Cuba | 3rd | 2.17 m |
| 1984 | Friendship Games | Moscow, Soviet Union | 2nd | 2.25 m |
| 1985 | World Indoor Games | Paris, France | 2nd | 2.30 m |
| 1985 | Central American and Caribbean Championships | Nassau, Bahamas | 1st | 2.30 m |
| 1985 | Universiade | Kobe, Japan | 10th | 2.20 m |
| 1986 | Pan American Junior Championships | Winter Park, Florida, U.S. | 1st | 2.27 m |
| 1986 | Central American and Caribbean; Junior Championships (U20) | Mexico City, Mexico | 1st | 2.31 m (A) |
| 1986 | World Junior Championships | Athens, Greece | 1st | 2.25 m |
| 1986 | Ibero-American Championships | Havana, Cuba | 1st | 2.30 m |
| 1987 | World Indoor Championships | Indianapolis, Indiana, U.S. | 4th | 2.32 m |
| 1987 | Pan American Games | Indianapolis, Indiana, U.S. | 1st | 2.32 m |
| 1987 | World Championships | Rome, Italy | 9th | 2.29 m |
| 1988 | Ibero-American Championships | Mexico City, Mexico | 1st | 2.35 m A |
| 1989 | World Indoor Championships | Budapest, Hungary | 1st | 2.43 m (iWR) |
| 1989 | Central American and Caribbean Championships | San Juan, San Juan | 1st | 2.44 m |
| 1989 | Universiade | Duisburg, West Germany | 1st | 2.34 m |
| 1990 | Central American and Caribbean Games | Mexico City, Mexico | 1st | 2.34 m (A) |
| 1991 | World Indoor Championships | Seville, Spain | 3rd | 2.31 m |
| 1991 | Pan American Games | Havana, Cuba | 1st | 2.35 m |
| 1991 | World Championships | Tokyo, Japan | 2nd | 2.36 m |
| 1992 | Ibero-American Championships | Seville, Spain | 1st | 2.30 m |
| 1992 | Olympic Games | Barcelona, Spain | 1st | 2.34 m |
| 1993 | World Indoor Championships | Toronto, Canada | 1st | 2.41 m |
| 1993 | Gran Premio Diputación | Salamanca, Spain | 1st | 2.45 m WR |
| 1993 | Central American and Caribbean Games | Ponce, Ponce | 1st | 2.35 m |
| 1993 | World Championships | Stuttgart, Germany | 1st | 2.40 m |
| 1994 | Goodwill Games | St. Petersburg, Russia | 1st | 2.40 m |
| 1995 | World Indoor Championships | Barcelona, Spain | 1st | 2.38 m |
| 1995 | Pan American Games | Mar del Plata, Argentina | 1st | 2.40 m |
| 1995 | World Championships | Gothenburg, Sweden | 2nd | 2.37 m |
| 1996 | Ibero-American Championships | Medellín, Colombia | 1st | 2.30 m |
| 1996 | Olympic Games | Atlanta, Georgia, U.S. | 11th | 2.25 m |
| 1997 | World Championships | Athens, Greece | 1st | 2.37 m |
| 1998 | Goodwill Games | Uniondale, New York, U.S. | 1st | 2.33 m |
| 1998 | Central American and Caribbean Games | Maracaibo, Venezuela | 1st | 2.37 m |
| 1999 | World Indoor Championships | Maebashi, Japan | 1st | 2.36 m |
| 1999 | Pan American Games | Winnipeg, Manitoba, Canada | – | DQ |
| 2000 | Olympic Games | Sydney, Australia | 2nd | 2.32 m |
| 2001 | World Indoor Championships | Lisbon, Portugal | 5th | 2.25 m |
| 2001 | World Championships | Edmonton, Ontario, Canada | – | DQ |

== See also ==
- List of doping cases in athletics

Awards
| Preceded by (Spain) Miguel Indurain | Prince of Asturias Award for Sports; 1993 | Succeeded by (Czech Republic) Martina Navratilova |
Records
| Preceded by (Sweden) Patrik Sjöberg | Men's High Jump World Record Holder; 1988-09-08 – | Succeeded by Incumbent |
Achievements
| Preceded by (Sweden) Patrik Sjöberg | Men's High Jump Best Year Performance; 1988–1989 | Succeeded by (Romania) Sorin Matei |
| Preceded by (Romania) Sorin Matei | Men's High Jump Best Year Performance alongside (United States) Hollis Conway (i), (United States) Charles Austin; 1991 | Succeeded by (Sweden) Patrik Sjöberg (i) |
| Preceded by (Sweden) Patrik Sjöberg (i) | Men's High Jump Best Year Performance; 1993–1995 | Succeeded by (United States) Charles Austin |
| Preceded by (United States) Charles Austin | Men's High Jump Best Year Performance; 1997–1998 | Succeeded by (Russia) Vyacheslav Voronin |
