= Georgi Dakov =

Bulgarian high jumper

Medal record

Men's athletics

Representing Bulgaria

European Championships
Bronze medal – third place	1990 Split	High jump

Georgi Krumov Dakov (Bulgarian: Георги Крумов Дъков; 21 October 1967 – 29 July 1996) was a Bulgarian high jumper.

His personal best jump was 2.36 m (7 ft 8 3/4 in), achieved in August 1990 in Brussels. This is the Bulgarian record. Dakov reached the 1992 Olympic final and was the 1990 European Championship bronze medallist. He was born in Pleven. He died in a car crash on 29 July 1996.

He was a five-time Bulgarian National Champion (1986, 87, 88, 90 & 91)

== International competitions ==
- Note: Results with a "q", indicate overall position in qualifying round.

Year	Competition	Venue	Position	Notes
Representing Bulgaria
1985	European Junior Championships	Cottbus, East Germany	3rd	2.18 m
1986	European Championships	Stuttgart, West Germany	=11th	2.17 m
1987	World Championships	Rome, Italy	=22nd q	2.21
1988	European Indoor Championships	Budapest, Hungary	6th	2.27
1989	European Indoor Championships	The Hague, Netherlands	9th	2.20
1989	World Indoor Championships	Budapest, Hungary	11th	2.25
1990	European Indoor Championships	Glasgow, United Kingdom	5th	2.27
1990	European Championships	Split, Yugoslavia	3rd	2.34 m
1991	World Indoor Championships	Seville, Spain	11th	2.24
1991	World Championships	Tokyo, Japan	23rd q	2.24
1992	European Indoor Championships	Genoa, Italy	6th	2.29
1992	Olympic Games	Barcelona, Spain	14th	2.24
1993	World Championships	Stuttgart, Germany	26th q	2.20
1994	European Indoor Championships	Paris, France	14th q	2.23
