= Hollis Conway =

American high jumper (born 1967)

Personal information
- Born: January 8, 1967 (age 59) Chicago, Illinois, U.S.
- Height: 6 ft 0 in (1.83 m)
- Weight: 150 lb (68 kg)

Sport
- Country: United States
- Sport: Athletics
- Event: High jump
- University team: Louisiana
Medal record
Men's athletics
Representing the United States
Olympic Games
Silver medal – second place	1988 Seoul	High jump
Bronze medal – third place	1992 Barcelona	High jump
World Championships
Bronze medal – third place	1991 Tokyo	High jump
World Indoor Championships
Gold medal – first place	1991 Sevilla	High jump
Universiade
Gold medal – first place	1991 Sheffield	High jump
Silver medal – second place	1989 Duisburg	High jump

Hollis Conway (born January 8, 1967) is an American track and field high jumper and a two-time Olympic medalist. He is currently employed by Lafayette Consolidated Government as the PARC Director in Lafayette Mayor-President Josh Guillory's administration. Conway previously served as the assistant director of Diversity, Leadership, & Education for the Louisiana Ragin' Cajuns football team under head coach Billy Napier. Conway was the top-ranked high jumper in the U.S. seven straight years from 1988 to 1994 and in the world for two of those years (1990 and 1991). Conway, John Thomas and Dwight Stones are the only Americans to win two Olympic medals in the high jump.

== Career ==
Born in Chicago, Illinois and a native of Shreveport, Louisiana, Conway went 7-8¾ in the event at the 1988 Summer Olympics in Seoul, South Korea, setting a U.S. collegiate record and earning a silver medal. He won a bronze medal in the 1992 Summer Olympics in Barcelona, Spain after going 7-8½ in winning the U.S. Olympic Team Trials that year.

In 1989, Conway broke the American record twice in the high jump, winning the NCAA Men's Outdoor Track and Field Championship at 7-9¾ and the U.S. Olympic Festival at 7–10. He earned his first of two world No. 1 rankings in 1990 when he swept both the U.S. indoor and outdoor titles and won the Goodwill Games. He had ten jumps of 7-8 or better that year.

A six-time NCAA All-American and three-time NCAA champion at the University of Louisiana at Lafayette (then known as the University of Southwestern Louisiana). He established a new NCAA indoor record of 2.37 m (7 ft 9 1/2 in) at the 1989 NCAA Indoor Championships: it remains as one of the longest-standing NCAA, and Championship Meet, records through 2011. He won at the 1988 NCAA Men's Outdoor Track and Field Championship and at the 1989 he won with an American outdoor record height. Conway was ranked No. 1 in the world in 1991 by winning the IAAF World Indoor Championships in Athletics in Seville, Spain, with an American indoor record of 7-10½.

He defended his U.S. outdoor championship and won the 1991 World University Games, while finishing third in the 1991 Pan American Games and World Outdoor Championships. He also won the British AAA Championships title at the 1991 AAA Championships. He was ranked third in the world in 1992 and 1993. He was a Goodwill Games runner-up in 1994.

In all, Conway won ten USA championship high jump titles (five outdoor, five indoor) before his retirement at the 2000 Drake Relays (where he jumped 6 ft 9in, on 29 April 2000). He is a member of the Louisiana Sports Hall of Fame and was inducted into the Drake Relays Hall of Fame in 1999. Conway wrote the foreword of the Complete Book of Jumps (Human Kinetics Europe Ltd, 1995).

His IAAF biography also credits Conway with a personal best in the triple jump of 16.17 m (53 ft 1/2 in), which is an international-class distance (especially given that he likely did not practice this event very often).

Conway was inducted into the USTFCCCA Collegiate Athlete Hall of Fame in 2024.

== Height differential ==
Conway jumped off his left foot and is considered short in stature, in comparison to other world-class high jumpers, many of whom stand 6'3"-to-6'5". His personal details on file with the IAAF officially list his height and weight as 1.83m and 68 kg, which equate to 6 feet one-quarter inch, and 150 pounds. However, in a high jump instructional video produced in 1991, which features Conway and his coach, Dick Booth, the narrator states Conway is "six feet one-half inch" (1.84m) and weighs "one hundred forty-five pounds". The narrator also says Conway has "average" speed, running 10.8 seconds for 100 meters, as well as having only an "average" vertical leap of 31 inches. At six feet tall, Conway has held a distinction with four others in track and field history for jumping over their own heights. Conway's best jump was 22 1/4 inches (57 cm) above his head.

== International competitions ==
Year	Competition	Venue	Position	Notes
Representing the United States
1986	World Junior Championships	Athens, Greece	2nd	2.22 m
1988	Summer Olympics	Seoul, South Korea	2nd	2.36 m
1989	Universiade	Duisburg, West Germany	2nd	2.31 m
1990	Goodwill Games	Seattle, United States	1st	2.33 m
1991	World Indoor Championships	Seville, Spain	1st	2.40 m
1991	Universiade	Sheffield, United Kingdom	1st	2.37 m
1991	Pan American Games	Havana, Cuba	3rd	2.32 m
1991	World Championships in Athletics	Tokyo, Japan	3rd	2.36 m
1992	Summer Olympics	Barcelona, Spain	3rd	2.34 m
1994	Goodwill Games	Saint Petersburg, Russia	2nd	2.28 m

Sporting positions
Preceded by (Romania) Sorin Matei	Men's High Jump Best Year Performance alongside (Cuba) Javier Sotomayor, (United States) Charles Austin; 1991(i)	Succeeded by (Sweden) Patrik Sjöberg (i)
