= 1998 IAAF Grand Prix =

- Edition: 14th
- Dates: 25 February – 19 September
- Meetings: 26 (+1 final)

The 1998 IAAF Grand Prix was the fourteenth edition of the annual global series of one-day track and field competitions organized by the International Association of Athletics Federations (IAAF). The series changed format that year to incorporate the six 1998 IAAF Golden League meetings as the top tier, followed by the existing Grand Prix I and Grand Prix II level meetings, then finally the Permit level meetings. Grand Prix I featured nine meetings from 3 May to 25 August and Grand Prix II featured 11 meetings from 25 February to 30 August, making a combined total of 26 meetings for the series. An additional 11 IAAF Outdoor Permit Meetings were attached to the circuit. Permit Meetings originally scheduled for Jakarta and San Jose, California were later dropped.

Performances on designated events on the circuit earned athletes points which qualified them for entry to the 1998 IAAF Grand Prix Final, held on 5 September in Moscow, Russia. A further four IAAF Permit Meetings of non-Grand Prix status included point-scoring events in order to allow athletes full opportunities to compete in certain events. Middle-distance runner Hicham El Guerrouj was the points leader for the series, taking 96 points from eight meetings. The highest scoring female athlete was Marion Jones on 88 points over eight meetings – a feat also achieved by men's runner-up Bryan Bronson.

== Meetings ==
Key: Non-Grand Prix, scoring meeting

#	Date	Meeting name	City	Country	Level
1	25 February	Melbourne Track Classic	Melbourne	Australia	IAAF Grand Prix II
—	28 February	Sydney Track Classic	Sydney	Australia	IAAF Permit Meeting
—	20 March	Engen Grand Prix Final	Cape Town	South Africa	IAAF Permit Meeting
2	27 March	All Africa Invitational	Johannesburg	South Africa	IAAF Grand Prix II
—	1 May	Meeting IAAF du Conseil de Général	Fort-de-France	Martinique	IAAF Permit Meeting
3	3 May	Grand Prix Brasil de Atletismo	Rio de Janeiro	Brazil	IAAF Grand Prix I
4	7 May	Qatar International Athletic Meet	Doha	Qatar	IAAF Grand Prix II
5	9 May	Japan Grand Prix	Osaka	Japan	IAAF Grand Prix I
—	16 May	Adidas Oregon Track Classic	Portland	United States	IAAF Permit Meeting
—	23 May	Jamaica Invitational	Kingston	Jamaica	IAAF Permit Meeting
6	30 May	Gran Premio Diputacion	Seville	Spain	IAAF Grand Prix II
7	31 May	Prefontaine Classic	Eugene	United States	IAAF Grand Prix I
8	1 June	Adriaan Paulen Memorial	Hengelo	Netherlands	IAAF Grand Prix II
9	4 June	St Denis – l'Humanité	Saint-Denis	France	IAAF Grand Prix II
10	9 June	Slovnaft Meeting	Bratislava	Slovakia	IAAF Grand Prix II
11	13 June	Ericsson GP	Helsinki	Finland	IAAF Grand Prix II
—	24 June	Meeting di Atletica Leggera Torino	Turin	Italy	IAAF Permit Meeting
—	26–27 June	ITC International Meet New Delhi	New Delhi	India	IAAF Permit Meeting
12	5 July	Zipfer Gugl Grand Prix	Linz	Austria	IAAF Grand Prix II
—	5 July	International Meeting Budapest	Budapest	Hungary	IAAF Permit Meeting
13	9 July	Bislett Games	Oslo	Norway	1998 IAAF Golden League
—	10 July	Live Nuremberg	Nuremberg	Germany	IAAF Permit Meeting
—	11 July	Meeting Lille-Métropole	Lille	France	IAAF Permit Meeting
14	14 July	Golden Gala	Rome	Italy	1998 IAAF Golden League
15	16 July	Nikaia	Nice	France	IAAF Grand Prix I
16	19 July	Grand Prix II	Gateshead	United Kingdom	IAAF Grand Prix II
17	25 July	US Open Meet	St. Louis	United States	IAAF Grand Prix I
18	29 July	Meeting Gaz de France	Paris	France	IAAF Grand Prix I
19	2 August	British Grand Prix	Sheffield	United Kingdom	IAAF Grand Prix I
20	5 August	DN Galan	Stockholm	Sweden	IAAF Grand Prix I
21	8 August	Herculis	Monte Carlo	Monaco	1998 IAAF Golden League
22	12 August	Weltklasse Zürich	Zürich	Switzerland	1998 IAAF Golden League
23	25 August	Athletissima	Lausanne	Switzerland	IAAF Grand Prix I
24	28 August	Memorial Van Damme	Brussels	Belgium	1998 IAAF Golden League
25	30 August	Rieti Meeting	Rieti	Italy	IAAF Grand Prix II
26	1 September	ISTAF Berlin	Berlin	Germany	1998 IAAF Golden League
F	5 September	1998 IAAF Grand Prix Final	Moscow	Russia	1998 IAAF Golden League; IAAF Grand Prix Final
—	19 September	Toto International Super Meeting	Tokyo	Japan	IAAF Permit Meeting

== Points standings ==
=== Overall men ===
Rank	Athlete	Nation	Meets	Points
1	Hicham El Guerrouj	Morocco	8	94
2	Bryan Bronson	United States	8	88
3	Jeff Hartwig	United States	8	79
4	Michael Johnson	United States	7	77
5	Denis Kapustin	Russia	8	76
6=	Luke Kipkosgei	Kenya	8	73
6=	Laban Rotich	Kenya	8	73
8	Haile Gebrselassie	Ethiopia	6	72
9	Ruslan Mashchenko	Russia	8	70
10=	Maurice Greene	United States	8	68
10=	Tyree Washington	United States	8	68
12	Daniel Komen	Kenya	8	66
13	Dinsdale Morgan	Jamaica	8	65
14=	Frankie Fredericks	Namibia	7	64
14=	John Kibowen	Kenya	8	64
16=	Maksim Tarasov	Russia	7	63
16=	Ato Boldon	Trinidad and Tobago	8	63
16=	Balázs Kiss	Hungary	8	63
19	Alvin Harrison	United States	8	60
20	Jonathan Edwards	Great Britain	6	59
21	Sergey Klyugin	Russia	7	58.5
22=	Mark Richardson	Great Britain	7	57
22=	Samuel Matete	Zambia	8	57
24=	Obadele Thompson	Barbados	8	56
24=	Jerome Young	United States	8	56
26	Pat Manson	United States	8	52.5
27=	Assefa Mezgebu	Ethiopia	6	52
27=	Jon Drummond	United States	7	52
27=	LaMark Carter	United States	8	52
27=	Tom Nyariki	Kenya	8	52

=== Overall women ===
Rank	Athlete	Nation	Meets	Points
1	Marion Jones	United States	8	88
2	Svetlana Masterkova	Russia	8	83
3	Trine Hattestad	Norway	8	80
4=	Falilat Ogunkoya	Nigeria	8	77
4=	Charity Opara	Nigeria	8	77
6	Melissa Morrison	United States	8	74
7	Michelle Freeman	Jamaica	8	71
8	Chryste Gaines	United States	8	67
9	Gabriela Szabo	Romania	7	66
10	Savatheda Fynes	Bahamas	8	65
11	Tanja Damaske	Germany	7	62
12=	Zahra Ouaziz	Morocco	7	61
12=	Tatyana Shikolenko	Russia	8	61
14	Glory Alozie	Nigeria	6	59.5
15=	Heike Drechsler	Germany	7	57
15=	Kutre Dulecha	Ethiopia	8	57
15=	Sonia O'Sullivan	Ireland	8	57
18=	Jackline Maranga	Kenya	8	56
18=	Jearl Miles Clark	United States	8	56
20=	Dionne Rose	Jamaica	8	55
20=	Gete Wami	Ethiopia	8	55
22	Inger Miller	United States	8	53.5
23=	Grit Breuer	Germany	5	50
23=	Carla Sacramento	Portugal	6	50
25=	Sandie Richards	Jamaica	7	47
25=	Angie Vaughn	United States	7	47
25=	Dawn Burrell	United States	8	47
25=	Lorraine Graham	Jamaica	8	47
29	Fiona May	Italy	6	46
30	Keturah Anderson	Canada	8	45.5
