= Athletics at the 1998 Goodwill Games – Results =

These are the official results of the athletics competition at the 1998 Goodwill Games which took place on July 19–22, 1998 in Uniondale, New York, United States.

== Men's results ==
=== 100 meters ===
July 21
Wind: -1.0 m/s

Rank	Lane	Name	Nationality	Time	Notes
1st place, gold medalist(s)	3	Maurice Greene	United States	9.96	
2nd place, silver medalist(s)	5	Ato Boldon	Trinidad and Tobago	10.00	
3rd place, bronze medalist(s)	8	Brian Lewis	United States	10.25	
4	6	Jon Drummond	United States	10.25	
5	2	Dennis Mitchell	United States	10.29	
6	1	Bruny Surin	Canada	10.30	
7	4	Donovan Bailey	Canada	10.30	
8	7	Tim Harden	United States	10.32	

=== 200 meters ===
July 19
Wind: -0.8 m/s

Rank	Name	Nationality	Time	Notes
1st place, gold medalist(s)	Ato Boldon	Trinidad and Tobago	20.15	
2nd place, silver medalist(s)	Tyree Washington	United States	20.29	
3rd place, bronze medalist(s)	Claudinei da Silva	Brazil	20.81	
4	Curtis Perry	United States	20.93	
5	Allen Johnson	United States	20.94	
6	Misael Ortiz	Cuba	21.13	
7	Gentry Bradley	United States	21.60	
8	Andrey Fedoriv	Russia	22.10	

=== 400 meters ===
July 21

Rank	Lane	Name	Nationality	Time	Notes
1st place, gold medalist(s)	4	Michael Johnson	United States	43.76	GR
2nd place, silver medalist(s)	3	Tyree Washington	United States	44.43	
3rd place, bronze medalist(s)	2	~~Antonio Pettigrew~~	~~United States~~	~~44.78~~	DQ
4	8	Alvin Harrison	United States	44.89	
5	6	Butch Reynolds	United States	45.10	
6	5	Jerome Young	United States	45.36	
7	1	Davian Clarke	Jamaica	45.56	
8	7	Michael McDonald	Jamaica	45.79	

Note: Antonio Pettigrew's performance was annulled due to his use of performance-enhancing drugs. It is unknown if his medal was re-awarded to the next athlete.

=== 800 meters ===
July 20

Rank	Name	Nationality	Time	Notes
1st place, gold medalist(s)	Patrick Ndururi	Kenya	1:45.30	
2nd place, silver medalist(s)	Norberto Téllez	Cuba	1:45.92	
3rd place, bronze medalist(s)	David Kiptoo	Kenya	1:46.50	
4	Mark Everett	United States	1:46.69	
5	Johnny Gray	United States	1:47.20	
6	Trinity Townsend	United States	1:47.18	
7	Trinity Gray	United States	1:47.19	
8	Andrey Loginov	Russia	1:51.67	

=== Mile ===
July 21

Rank	Name	Nationality	Time	Notes
1st place, gold medalist(s)	Noureddine Morceli	Algeria	3:53.39	
2nd place, silver medalist(s)	William Tanui	Kenya	3:54.05	
3rd place, bronze medalist(s)	Daniel Komen	Kenya	3:54.78	
4	Jamey Harris	United States	3:55.39	
5	Andrey Zadorozhniy	Russia	3:56.44	
6	Paul McMullen	United States	3:56.60	
7	Ahmed Krama	Algeria	3:57.27	
8	Jason Pyrah	United States	3:59.37	
9	Steve Holman	United States	4:06.33	

=== 5000 meters ===
July 22

Rank	Name	Nationality	Time	Notes
1st place, gold medalist(s)	Luke Kipkosgei	Kenya	13:20.27	
2nd place, silver medalist(s)	Khalid Boulami	Morocco	13:20.66	
3rd place, bronze medalist(s)	Tom Nyariki	Kenya	13:23.34	
4	Bob Kennedy	United States	13:27.51	
5	Robbie Johnston	New Zealand	13:48.01	
6	Marc Davis	United States	13:50.84	
7	Mark Carroll	Ireland	13:52.76	
8	Alan Culpepper	United States	13:52.98	
9	Pete Julian	United States	14:22.32	

=== 10,000 meters ===
July 21

Rank	Name	Nationality	Time	Notes
1st place, gold medalist(s)	Julius Gitahi	Kenya	27:49.26	
2nd place, silver medalist(s)	Simon Maina	Kenya	27:49.65	
3rd place, bronze medalist(s)	James Koskei	Kenya	28:51.02	
4	Germán Silva	Mexico	29:00.64	
5	Dan Browne	United States	29:24.98	
6	Mebrahtom Keflezighi	United States	29:57.80	
7	Reuben Reina	United States	30:57.15	
8	James Menon	United States	31:46.48	
	Jon Brown	Great Britain	DNS	

=== 110 meters hurdles ===
July 20
Wind: +0.9 m/s

Rank	Name	Nationality	Time	Notes
1st place, gold medalist(s)	Mark Crear	United States	13.06	GR
2nd place, silver medalist(s)	Allen Johnson	United States	13.10	
3rd place, bronze medalist(s)	Reggie Torian	United States	13.16	
4	Colin Jackson	Great Britain	13.17	
5	Anier García	Cuba	13.39	
6	Tony Dees	United States	13.61	
7	Dudley Dorival	United States	13.71	
8	Sergey Manakov	Russia	13.96	

=== 400 meters hurdles ===
July 19

Rank	Name	Nationality	Time	Notes
1st place, gold medalist(s)	Bryan Bronson	United States	47.15	GR
2nd place, silver medalist(s)	Angelo Taylor	United States	47.92	
3rd place, bronze medalist(s)	Joey Woody	United States	48.59	
4	Stéphane Diagana	France	48.62	
5	Ruslan Mashchenko	Russia	48.70	
6	Rohan Robinson	Australia	48.81	
7	Samuel Matete	Zambia	48.96	
8	Derrick Adkins	United States	49.74	

=== 3000 m steeplechase ===
July 20

Rank	Name	Nationality	Time	Notes
1st place, gold medalist(s)	Bernard Barmasai	Kenya	8:14.26	GR
2nd place, silver medalist(s)	John Kosgei	Kenya	8:18.40	
3rd place, bronze medalist(s)	Brahim Boulami	Morocco	8:20.00	
4	Pascal Dobert	United States	8:23.61	
5	Tony Cosey	United States	8:27.60	
6	Tom Nohilly	United States	8:29.35	
7	John Mortimer	United States	8:36.30	
8	Bachdad Racham	Algeria	9:08.69	
	Moses Kiptinui	Kenya	DNF	

=== 4 × 100 meters relay ===
July 22

Rank	Lane	Nation	Competitors	Time	Notes
1st place, gold medalist(s)	5	United States	Jon Drummond, Tim Harden, Dennis Mitchell, Maurice Greene	37.90	GR
2nd place, silver medalist(s)	6	Canada	Brad McCuaig, Glenroy Gilbert, Bruny Surin, Donovan Bailey	38.23	
3rd place, bronze medalist(s)	7	Cuba	Alfredo García, Misael Ortiz, Luis Pérez, Anier García	39.34	
4	8	Jamaica	Patrick Brown, Patrick Jarrett, Clarkson Reid, Garth Robinson	39.50	
5	4	Russia	Sergey Bychkov, Andrey Fedoriv, Andrey Grigoryev, Sergey Slukin	39.63	

=== 4 × 400 meters relay ===
July 22

Rank	Nation	Competitors	Time	Notes
1st place, gold medalist(s)	~~United States~~	~~Jerome Young, Antonio Pettigrew, Tyree Washington, Michael Johnson~~	~~2:54.20~~	~~WR, GR~~
2nd place, silver medalist(s)	Poland	Piotr Rysiukiewicz, Tomasz Czubak, Piotr Haczek, Robert Maćkowiak	2:58.00	NR
3rd place, bronze medalist(s)	Jamaica	Greg Haughton, Michael McDonald, Michael Blackwood, Davian Clarke	2:58.33	
4	Russia	Dmitriy Bey, Dmitriy Kosov, Boris Gorban, Vladislav Shiryayev	3:06.53	

Note: The USA's performance was annulled due to Antonio Pettigrew's use of performance-enhancing drugs. It is unknown if the medals were re-awarded to the next teams.

=== 20,000 meters walk ===
July 20

Rank	Name	Nationality	Time	Notes
1st place, gold medalist(s)	Ilya Markov	Russia	1:23:29.70	
2nd place, silver medalist(s)	Daniel García	Mexico	1:25:52.30	
3rd place, bronze medalist(s)	Jefferson Pérez	Ecuador	1:29:18.40	
4	Mikhail Shchennikov	Russia	1:29:35.80	
5	Gary Morgan	United States	1:36:48.10	
6	Curt Clausen	United States	1:37:55.80	
7	Jonathan Matthews	United States	1:38:13.40	
	Bernardo Segura	Mexico	DQ	
	Tim Seaman	United States	DQ	

=== High jump ===
July 22

Rank	Name	Nationality	Result	Notes
1st place, gold medalist(s)	Javier Sotomayor	Cuba	2.33	
2nd place, silver medalist(s)	Charles Austin	United States	2.33	
3rd place, bronze medalist(s)	Brian Brown	United States	2.29	
4	Steinar Hoen	Norway	2.25	
5	Troy Kemp	Bahamas	2.25	
6	Nathan Leeper	United States	2.20	
7	Sergey Klyugin	Russia	2.20	
8	Hollis Conway	United States	2.15	

=== Pole vault ===
July 21

Rank	Name	Nationality	5.40	5.60	5.70	5.80	5.87	5.94	6.01	Result	Notes
1st place, gold medalist(s)	Jeff Hartwig	United States	?	?	–	xo	o	–	o	6.01	=GR, AR
2nd place, silver medalist(s)	Jean Galfione	France								5.80	
3rd place, bronze medalist(s)	Pat Manson	United States								5.70	
4	William Deering	United States								5.70	
5	Dean Starkey	United States								5.60	
6	Vadim Strogalev	Russia								5.60	
7	Viktor Chistiakov	Russia								5.40	
7	Igor Trandenkov	Russia								5.40	
	Sergey Bubka	Ukraine								NM	

=== Long jump ===
July 20

Rank	Name	Nationality	Result	Notes
1st place, gold medalist(s)	Iván Pedroso	Cuba	8.54	
2nd place, silver medalist(s)	Erick Walder	United States	8.38	
3rd place, bronze medalist(s)	James Beckford	Jamaica	8.34	
4	Sean Robbins	United States	8.33	
5	Kevin Dilworth	United States	8.13	
6	Stanislav Tarasenko	Russia	7.63	
7	Kirill Sosunov	Russia	7.30	

=== Triple jump ===
July 20

Rank	Name	Nationality	Result	Notes
1st place, gold medalist(s)	Jonathan Edwards	Great Britain	17.65	
2nd place, silver medalist(s)	Yoelbi Quesada	Cuba	17.27	
3rd place, bronze medalist(s)	LaMark Carter	United States	17.07	
4	Von Ware	United States	16.97	
5	Robert Howard	United States	16.88	
6	Jérôme Romain	Dominica	16.84	
7	Hrvoje Verzi	Germany	16.68	
8	Kenny Harrison	United States	16.53	

=== Shot put ===
July 19

Rank	Name	Nationality	Result	Notes
1st place, gold medalist(s)	John Godina	United States	21.45	
2nd place, silver medalist(s)	C. J. Hunter	United States	20.79	
3rd place, bronze medalist(s)	Adam Nelson	United States	20.39	
4	Yuriy Bilonoh	Ukraine	20.26	
5	Gregg Tafralis	United States	20.23	
6	Brad Snyder	Canada	19.62	
7	Kevin Toth	United States	19.45	
8	Pavel Chumachenko	Russia	17.53	
	Oliver-Sven Buder	Germany	??.??	

=== Discus throw ===
July 19

Rank	Name	Nationality	Result	Notes
1st place, gold medalist(s)	Dmitriy Shevchenko	Russia	64.81	
2nd place, silver medalist(s)	Andy Bloom	United States	63.97	
3rd place, bronze medalist(s)	John Godina	United States	62.84	
4	Jason Tunks	Canada	62.53	
5	Aleksander Tammert	Estonia	62.21	
6	Casey Malone	United States	61.39	
7	Sergey Lyakhov	Russia	60.14	
8	Vasiliy Kaptyukh	Belarus	57.75	
9	Carl Brown	United States	57.42	

=== Hammer throw ===
July 22

Rank	Name	Nationality	Result	Notes
1st place, gold medalist(s)	Vasiliy Sidorenko	Russia	80.89	
2nd place, silver medalist(s)	Lance Deal	United States	78.13	
3rd place, bronze medalist(s)	Ilya Konovalov	Russia	77.10	
4	Aleksandr Seleznyov	Russia	75.98	
5	Kevin McMahon	United States	73.41	
6	Jud Logan	United States	71.00	
7	Travis Nutter	United States	67.18	

=== Javelin throw ===
July 19

Rank	Name	Nationality	Result	Notes
1st place, gold medalist(s)	Sergey Makarov	Russia	84.11	
2nd place, silver medalist(s)	Tom Pukstys	United States	79.86	
3rd place, bronze medalist(s)	Andrew Currey	Australia	78.50	
4	Mark Fletcher	United States	75.36	
5	Ed Kaminski	United States	74.08	
6	Josh Johnson	United States	73.60	

=== Decathlon ===
July 19–20

The highest mark recorded in each event is highlighted in yellow

Rank	Athlete	Nationality	100m	LJ	SP	HJ	400m	110m H	DT	PV	JT	1500m	Points	Notes
1st place, gold medalist(s)	Dan O'Brien	United States	10.71	7.78	15.67	2.11	48.04	13.67	48.87	5.20	66.31	5:08.77	8755	GR
2nd place, silver medalist(s)	Chris Huffins	United States	10.68	7.85	15.66	2.14	48.17	14.14	49.72	4.70	61.12	4:59.99	8576	
3rd place, bronze medalist(s)	Tomáš Dvořák	Czech Republic	11.00	7.48	16.08	1.87	48.16	13.99	47.31	4.80	70.96	4:45.50	8428	
4	Erki Nool	Estonia	10.89	7.77	14.77	1.87	47.10	14.67	41.45	5.10	71.91	4:46.59	8386	
5	Mike Smith	Canada	11.40	7.17	16.78	2.02	49.45	14.94	52.52	4.60	69.02	5:03.81	8171	
6	Eduard Hämäläinen	Finland	11.21	7.28	15.90	1.96	47.61	14.20	45.81	5.10	54.32	4:57.55	8136	
7	Brian Brophy	United States	11.71	7.36	15.38	2.02	51.11	15.25	51.79	DNS	50.90	5:04.90	6874	
	Ricky Barker	United States	11.17	7.18	14.41	1.93	50.30	DNS	–	–	–	–	DNF	

== Women's results ==
=== 100 meters ===
July 19
Wind: -0.8 m/s

Rank	Lane	Name	Nationality	Time	Notes
1st place, gold medalist(s)	4	Marion Jones	United States	10.90	GR
2nd place, silver medalist(s)	3	Zhanna Pintusevich	Ukraine	11.09	
3rd place, bronze medalist(s)	2	Inger Miller	United States	11.18	
4	6	Merlene Ottey	Jamaica	11.21	
5	6	Chryste Gaines	United States	11.23	
6	7	Debbie Ferguson	Bahamas	11.30	
7	1	Natalya Voronova	Russia	11.58	
8	8	Li Xuemei	China	11.59	

=== 200 meters ===
July 20
Wind: +0.4 m/s

Rank	Name	Nationality	Time	Notes
1st place, gold medalist(s)	Marion Jones	United States	21.80	GR
2nd place, silver medalist(s)	Zhanna Pintusevich	Ukraine	22.46	
3rd place, bronze medalist(s)	Beverly McDonald	Jamaica	22.67	
4	Cheryl Taplin	United States	22.79	
5	Nova Peris-Kneebone	Australia	22.99	
6	Zundra Feagin-Alexander	United States	23.30	
7	Carlette Guidry	United States	23.18	
8	Yekaterina Leshcheva	Russia	23.33	

=== 400 meters ===
July 21

Rank	Lane	Name	Nationality	Time	Notes
1st place, gold medalist(s)	5	Falilat Ogunkoya	Nigeria	49.89	GR
2nd place, silver medalist(s)	4	Jearl Miles Clark	United States	50.43	
3rd place, bronze medalist(s)	3	Sandie Richards	Jamaica	50.98	
4	1	Monique Hennagan	United States	51.20	
5	2	Kim Graham	United States	51.66	
6	8	Rochelle Stevens	United States	52.08	
7	6	Irina Rosikhina	Russia	52.13	
	7	Gwen Torrence	United States	DNS	

=== 800 meters ===
July 19

Rank	Name	Nationality	Time	Notes
1st place, gold medalist(s)	Maria Mutola	Mozambique	1:58.83	
2nd place, silver medalist(s)	Jearl Miles Clark	United States	1:59.08	
3rd place, bronze medalist(s)	Joetta Clark	United States	2:00.02	
4	Meredith Valmon	United States	2:00.10	
5	Diane Modahl	Great Britain	2:02.01	
6	Anna Bagmut	Russia	2:05.78	
7	Hazel Clark	United States	2:08.68	

=== Mile ===
July 20

Rank	Name	Nationality	Time	Notes
1st place, gold medalist(s)	Svetlana Masterkova	Russia	4:20.39	GR
2nd place, silver medalist(s)	Regina Jacobs	United States	4:20.93	
3rd place, bronze medalist(s)	Suzy Hamilton	United States	4:22.93	
4	Jackline Maranga	Kenya	4:25.62	
5	Sonia O'Sullivan	Ireland	4:26.19	
6	Kathy Butler	Canada	4:29.50	
7	Alisa Harvey	United States	4:29.65	
8	Amy Wickus	United States	4:31.12	
9	Elva Dryer	United States	4:33.57	
10	Leah Pells	Canada	4:34.81	
	Yekaterina Podkopayeva	Russia	DNF	

=== 5000 meters ===
July 20

Rank	Name	Nationality	Time	Notes
1st place, gold medalist(s)	Olga Yegorova	Russia	15:53.05	
2nd place, silver medalist(s)	Libbie Hickman	United States	15:54.93	
3rd place, bronze medalist(s)	Lyubov Kremlyova	Russia	16:00.20	
4	Dong Yanmei	China	16:00.56	
5	Cheri Kenah	United States	16:01.62	
6	Nnenna Lynch	United States	16:04.54	
7	Amy Rudolph	United States	16:05.73	
8	Michiko Shimizu	Japan	16:08.36	
9	Jiang Bo	China	16:17.32	
10	Liu Jianying	China	17:02.41	

=== 10,000 meters ===
July 20

Rank	Name	Nationality	Time	Notes
1st place, gold medalist(s)	Tegla Loroupe	Kenya	32:15.44	
2nd place, silver medalist(s)	Sally Barsosio	Kenya	32:50.16	
3rd place, bronze medalist(s)	Dong Yanmei	China	32:59.85	
4	Shelly Steely	United States	33:19.18	
5	Jennifer Rhines	United States	33:44.19	
6	Kylie Risk	Australia	34:04.35	
7	Kristin Beaney	United States	34:37.12	
8	Martha Shue	United States	34:44.13	
9	Jiang Bo	China	35:34.48	
	Jenny Crain	United States	DNF	
	Lidiya Vasilevskaya	Russia	DNF	

=== 100 meters hurdles ===
July 20
Wind: +0.2 m/s

Rank	Name	Nationality	Time	Notes
1st place, gold medalist(s)	Angie Vaughn	United States	12.72	
2nd place, silver medalist(s)	Gillian Russell	Jamaica	12.78	
3rd place, bronze medalist(s)	Michelle Freeman	Jamaica	12.85	
4	Miesha McKelvy	United States	12.92	
5	Brigita Bukovec	Slovenia	13.19	
6	Melissa Morrison	United States	13.39	
7	Cheryl Dickey	United States	13.40	
	Svetlana Laukhova	Russia	DNF	

=== 400 meters hurdles ===
July 19

Rank	Name	Nationality	Time	Notes
1st place, gold medalist(s)	Deon Hemmings	Jamaica	54.20	
2nd place, silver medalist(s)	Debbie-Ann Parris	Jamaica	54.49	
3rd place, bronze medalist(s)	Kim Batten	United States	54.62	
4	Michelle Johnson	United States	55.18	
5	Susan Smith	Ireland	55.22	
6	Yekaterina Bakhvalova	Russia	55.69	
7	LaTanya Sheffield	United States	55.96	
8	Sandra Glover	United States	56.97	

=== 3000 m steeplechase ===
July 19

Rank	Name	Nationality	Time	Notes
1st place, gold medalist(s)	Svetlana Rogova	Russia	9:57.62	
2nd place, silver medalist(s)	Daniela Petrescu	Romania	9:58.28	
3rd place, bronze medalist(s)	Lesley Lehane	United States	10:08.29	
4	Marina Pluzhnikova	Russia	10:16.61	
5	Karen Harvey	Canada	10:18.24	
6	Courtney Meldrum	United States	10:31.77	
7	Tara Haynes	United States	10:32.40	
8	Elizabeth Jackson	United States	10:45.97	

=== 4 × 100 meters relay ===
July 22

Rank	Nation	Competitors	Time	Notes
1st place, gold medalist(s)	United States	Cheryl Taplin, Chryste Gaines, Angie Vaughn, Carlette Guidry	42.06	GR
2nd place, silver medalist(s)	Bahamas	Sevatheda Fynes, Chandra Sturrup, Debbie Ferguson, Pauline Davis	42.19	
3rd place, bronze medalist(s)	Russia	Yekaterina Leshcheva, Galina Malchugina, Natalya Voronova, Oksana Ekk	42.62	
4	Jamaica	Beverly McDonald, Tayna Lawrence, Donette Brown, Brigitte Foster	43.36	

=== 4 × 400 meters relay ===
July 22

Rank	Nation	Competitors	Time	Notes
1st place, gold medalist(s)	Jamaica	Charmaine Howell, Sandie Richards, Tracey Barnes, Deon Hemmings	3:24.76	
2nd place, silver medalist(s)	United States	Toya Brown, Rochelle Stevens, Monique Hennagan, Kim Graham	3:24.81	
3rd place, bronze medalist(s)	Russia	Tatyana Chebykina, Tatyana Sautkina, Yekaterina Bakhvalova, Irina Rosikhina	3:25.58	

=== 10,000 meters walk ===
July 21

Rank	Name	Nationality	Time	Notes
1st place, gold medalist(s)	Yelena Nikolayeva	Russia	43:51.97	
2nd place, silver medalist(s)	Nadezhda Ryashkina	Russia	44:25.99	
3rd place, bronze medalist(s)	Joanne Dow	United States	45:36.92	
4	Michelle Rohl	United States	46:04.15	
5	Debbi Lawrence	United States	47:36.97	
	Victoria Herazo	United States	DQ	
	Graciela Mendoza	Mexico	DQ	

=== High jump ===
July 20

Rank	Name	Nationality	Result	Notes
1st place, gold medalist(s)	Tisha Waller	United States	1.97	
2nd place, silver medalist(s)	Yuliya Lyakhova	Russia	1.93	
3rd place, bronze medalist(s)	Amy Acuff	United States	1.93	
4	Nelė Žilinskienė	Lithuania	1.93	
5	Yelena Gulyayeva	Russia	1.89	
6	Karol Jenkins	United States	1.89	
7	Lisa Coleman	United States	1.80	

=== Pole vault ===
July 19

Rank	Name	Nationality	Result	Notes
1st place, gold medalist(s)	Yelena Belyakova	Russia	4.38	GR
2nd place, silver medalist(s)	Emma George	Australia	4.30	
3rd place, bronze medalist(s)	Vala Flosadóttir	Iceland	4.20	
4	Anzhela Balakhonova	Ukraine	4.20	
5	Tatiana Grigorieva	Australia	4.20	
6	Kellie Suttle	United States	4.10	
7	Melissa Price	United States	4.10	
8	Sun Caiyun	China	4.10	
9	Daniela Bártová	Czech Republic	4.00	
10	Kim Becker	United States	3.80	
	Stacy Dragila	United States	NM	

=== Long jump ===
July 19

Rank	Name	Nationality	Result	Notes
1st place, gold medalist(s)	Shana Williams	United States	6.92	
2nd place, silver medalist(s)	Lyudmila Galkina	Russia	6.84	
3rd place, bronze medalist(s)	Niki Xanthou	Greece	6.83	
4	Dawn Burrell	United States	6.82	
5	Tatyana Kotova	Russia	6.66	
6	Sharon Couch-Jewell	United States	6.57	
7	Yuan Hunt	United States	6.44	
	Chioma Ajunwa	Nigeria	?.??	

=== Triple jump ===
July 19

Rank	Name	Nationality	Result	Notes
1st place, gold medalist(s)	Šárka Kašpárková	Czech Republic	14.76	GR
2nd place, silver medalist(s)	Tatyana Lebedeva	Russia	14.14	
3rd place, bronze medalist(s)	Tiombe Hurd	United States	13.63	
4	Suzette Lee	Jamaica	13.57	
5	Cynthea Rhodes	United States	13.56	
6	Sheila Hudson	United States	13.35	
7	Natasha Gibson	Trinidad and Tobago	13.22	
8	Stacey Bowers	United States	13.21	

=== Shot put ===
July 19

Rank	Name	Nationality	Result	Notes
1st place, gold medalist(s)	Irina Korzhanenko	Russia	19.94	
2nd place, silver medalist(s)	Connie Price-Smith	United States	19.46	
3rd place, bronze medalist(s)	Valentina Fedyushina	Ukraine	19.07	
4	Nadine Kleinert	Germany	18.55	
5	Teri Tunks	United States	18.30	
6	Judy Oakes	Great Britain	18.12	
7	Tressa Thompson	United States	17.30	
8	Dawn Dumble	United States	16.68	

=== Discus throw ===
July 19

Rank	Name	Nationality	Result	Notes
1st place, gold medalist(s)	Natalya Sadova	Russia	65.80	
2nd place, silver medalist(s)	Ilke Wyludda	Germany	63.03	
3rd place, bronze medalist(s)	Kristin Kuehl	United States	61.84	
4	Edie Boyer	United States	60.01	
5	Bárbara Hechavarría	Cuba	58.98	
6	Cao Qi	China	58.51	
7	Dawn Dumble	United States	58.45	
8	Lisa-Marie Vizaniari	Australia	58.43	
9	Lacy Barnes-Mileham	United States	56.40	

=== Hammer throw ===
July 21

Rank	Name	Nationality	Result	Notes
1st place, gold medalist(s)	Mihaela Melinte	Romania	72.64	WR
2nd place, silver medalist(s)	Olga Kuzenkova	Russia	70.98	
3rd place, bronze medalist(s)	Amy Palmer	United States	66.33	
4	Debbie Sosimenko	Australia	65.82	
5	Alla Davydova	Russia	63.77	
6	Dawn Ellerbe	United States	62.78	
7	Lisa Misipeka	American Samoa	62.76	
8	Anna Norgren	United States	61.27	
9	Windy Dean	United States	58.03	

=== Javelin throw ===
July 21

Rank	Name	Nationality	Result	Notes
1st place, gold medalist(s)	Joanna Stone	Australia	66.29	
2nd place, silver medalist(s)	Isel López	Cuba	63.72	
3rd place, bronze medalist(s)	Sonia Bisset	Cuba	62.64	
4	Oksana Makarova	Russia	59.15	
5	Ann Crouse	United States	53.78	
6	Lynda Lipson-Blutreich	United States	53.51	
7	Nicole Carroll	United States	53.30	
8	Windy Dean	United States	51.87	

=== Heptathlon ===
July 21–22

The highest mark recorded in each event is highlighted in yellow

Rank	Athlete	Nationality	100m H	HJ	SP	200m	LJ	JT	800m	Points	Notes
1st place, gold medalist(s)	Jackie Joyner-Kersee	United States	13.29	1.75	15.59	24.47	6.73w	43.33	2:17.61	6502	
2nd place, silver medalist(s)	DeDee Nathan	United States	13.28	1.81	14.44	24.11	6.65w	40.48	2:16.01	6479	
3rd place, bronze medalist(s)	Kelly Blair LaBounty	United States	13.46	1.81	13.08	24.23	6.50	49.25	2:16.38	6465	
4	Remigija Nazarovienė	Lithuania	13.35	1.78	15.12	24.46	6.43	39.77	2:16.84	6346	
5	Irina Belova	Russia	13.48	1.75	12.83	24.28	6.34	41.68	2:06.94	6305	
6	Urszula Włodarczyk	Poland	13.66	1.78	14.35	24.80	6.29	44.92	2:15.42	6291	
7	Sabine Braun	Germany	13.57	1.75	13.50	24.68	6.36	46.70	DNS	5391	
8	Shelia Burrell	United States	13.22	NM	14.13	24.52	5.79	38.22	2:17.74	5098	
