= 1997 USA Outdoor Track and Field Championships =

- Dates: June 12–15
- Host city: Indianapolis, Indiana
- Venue: IU Michael A. Carroll Track & Soccer Stadium
- Level: Senior
- Type: Outdoor
- Events: 40 (men: 20; women: 20)

The 1997 USA Outdoor Track and Field Championships was organised by USA Track & Field and held from June 20 to 24 at the IU Michael A. Carroll Track & Soccer Stadium in Indianapolis, Indiana. The four-day competition served as the national championships in track and field for the United States and also the trials for the 1997 World Championships in Athletics in Athens, Greece.

It was the third time that the stadium in Indianapolis had held the combined gender national track and field event. The USA Junior Championships were held in conjunction with the event.

Athletes that finished in the top three of their event and held the IAAF qualifying standard were eligible to represent the United States at the 1997 World Championships. The United States was able to send three athletes per event to the competition, provided they all met the A qualification standard. In addition, this was the first year to also allow the reigning world champions an automatic qualification separate from the national selection. That new rule was essentially created to allow Michael Johnson to qualify even though at the time of these championships he was unable to compete (and thus qualify) due to the injury he received in the Bailey–Johnson 150-metre race just two weeks earlier. Johnson did recover in time for the World Championships and did successfully defend his world championship. The World Championships national selection for the marathon and 50 kilometres walk were incorporated into the discrete national championship meets for those events. Selection for the relay races were made by committee.

Five Americans went on to win an individual gold medal at the 1997 World Championships; Johnson, Maurice Greene, Allen Johnson, John Godina and Marion Jones. In addition USA won the Women's 4 × 100 metres relay, and took silver in the 4 × 400 metres relay. The Men's 4 × 400 metres relay crossed the finish line in first, but was disqualified in 2009 following the admission of long term doping by Antonio Pettigrew.

== Results ==
Key: ≠ Not selected for World Championships in Athletics due to failure to reach IAAF qualifying standard within the specified time limit.

=== Men track events ===
Event	Gold		Silver		Bronze	
100 meters Wind +0.2	Maurice Greene	9.90 CR	Tim Montgomery	9.92	Michael Marsh	10.03
200 meters Wind +1.0	Jon Drummond	20.23	Kevin Little	20.27	Gentry Bradley	20.49
400 meters	Antonio Pettigrew	44.65	Tyree Washington	44.79	Jerome Young	44.83
800 meters	Mark Everett	1.44.37	Brandon Rock	1.44.79	Rich Kenah	1.44.87
1500 meters	Seneca Lassiter	3.45.85	Karl Paranya	3.46.78	Jason Pyrah	3.46.94
5000 meters	Bob Kennedy	13.30.86	Alan Culpepper	13.48.90	Brian Baker	13.59.36
10,000 meters	Mike Mykytok	28.34.92	Reuben Reina	28.34.93	Pete Julian	28.35.65
110 m hurdles Wind +0.6	Allen Johnson	13.25	Reggie Torian	13.28	Terry Reese	13.32
400 m hurdles	Bryan Bronson	47.79	Derrick Adkins	48.00	Joey Woody	48.18
3000 m s'chase	Mark Croghan	8.20.86	Tom Nohilly	8.23.66	Pascal Dobert	8.24.23
20 km walk	Curt Clausen	1:27:12	Andrew Hermann	1:28:23	Tim Seaman	1:30:00

=== Men field events ===
Event	Gold		Silver		Bronze	
High jump	Charles Austin	2.31 m (7 ft 6 3/4 in)	Randy Jenkins	2.28 m (7 ft 5 3/4 in)	Brian Brown	2.28 m (7 ft 5 3/4 in)
Pole vault	Lawrence Johnson	5.90 m (19 ft 4 1/4 in)	Dean Starkey	5.85 m (19 ft 2 1/4 in)	Pat Manson	5.80 m (19 ft 1/4 in)
Long jump	Joe Greene	8.42 m (27 ft 7 1/4 in)	Erick Walder	8.38 m (27 ft 5 3/4 in)	Kevin Dilworth	8.29 m (27 ft 2 1/4 in)
Triple jump	Kenny Harrison	16.97 m (55 ft 8 in)	LaMark Carter≠	16.76 m (54 ft 11 3/4 in)	Robert Howard	16.62 m (54 ft 6 1/4 in)
Shot put	Randy Barnes	21.37 m (70 ft 1 1/4 in)	John Godina	21.19 m (69 ft 6 1/4 in)	C. J. Hunter	21.07 m (69 ft 1 1/2 in)
Discus throw	John Godina	67.38 m (221 ft 0 in)	Andy Bloom	65.30 m (214 ft 2 in)	Adam Setliff	63.35 m (207 ft 10 in)
Hammer throw	Kevin McMahon	77.42 m (254 ft 0 in)	Jud Logan	75.39 m (247 ft 4 in)	David Popejoy	73.33 m (240 ft 7 in)
Javelin throw	Tom Pukstys	83.97 m (275 ft 5 in) CR	Ed Kaminski	79.91 m (262 ft 2 in)	Breaux Greer	78.10 m (256 ft 2 in)
Decathlon	Steve Fritz	8604	Chris Huffins	8458	Shawn Wilbourn	8268

=== Women track events ===
Event	Gold		Silver		Bronze	
100 meters Wind -1.1	Marion Jones	10.97	Chryste Gaines	11.19	Inger Miller	11.21
200 meters Wind -0.1	Inger Miller	22.62	Cheryl Taplin	22.90	Zundra Feagin-Alexander	23.06
400 meters	Jearl Miles Clark	49.40 CR	Kim Graham	50.65	Maicel Malone	50.74
800 meters	Kathy Rounds	2:00.45	Joetta Clark Diggs	2:00.64	Jill McMullen	2:00.81
1500 meters	Regina Jacobs	4:03.42	Suzy Favor Hamilton	4:04.36	Sarah Thorsett	4:07.34
5000 meters	Libbie Hickman	15:37.73	Amy Rudolph	15:45.21	Melody Fairchild	15:45.54
10,000 meters	Lynn Jennings	32:26.41	Annette Peters	32:28.55	Deena Kastor	32:53.18
100 m hurdles Wind +0.0	Melissa Morrison	12.61	Anjanette Kirkland	12.74	Dawn Bowles	12.74
400 m hurdles	Kim Batten	52.97 CR	Tonja Buford-Bailey	54.05	Ryan Tolbert	54.21
3000 m s'chase	Melissa Teemant	10:30.90	Elizabeth Jackson	10:38.72	Gracie Padilla	10:44.12
10 km walk	Debbi Lawrence	46:45.36	Sara Standley	46:53.07	Victoria Herazo	47:18.05

=== Women field events ===
Event	Gold		Silver		Bronze	
High jump	Amy Acuff	1.96 m (6 ft 5 in)	Angela Spangler	1.93 m (6 ft 3 3/4 in)	Erin Aldrich	1.93 m (6 ft 3 3/4 in)
Pole vault	Stacy Dragila	4.30 m (14 ft 1 1/4 in)	Melissa Price	4.00 m (13 ft 1 1/4 in)	Melissa Mueller	3.95 m (12 ft 11 1/2 in)
Long jump	Marion Jones	6.93 m (22 ft 8 3/4 in)	Jackie Joyner-Kersee	6.91 m (22 ft 8 in)w	Sharon Jewell	6.77 m (22 ft 2 1/2 in)
Triple jump	Niambi Dennis	13.63 m (44 ft 8 1/2 in)	Shonda Swift	13.61 m (44 ft 7 3/4 in)	Cynthea Rhodes	13.54 m (44 ft 5 in)
Shot put	Connie Price-Smith	19.06 m (62 ft 6 1/4 in)	Valeyta Althouse	18.60 m (61 ft 1/4 in)	Tressa Thompson	17.73 m (58 ft 2 in)
Discus throw	Lacy Barnes-Mileham	61.16 m (200 ft 7 3/4 in)	Suzy Powell	60.46 m (198 ft 4 1/4 in)	Edie Boyer	60.08 m (197 ft 1 1/4 in)
Hammer throw	Dawn Ellerbe	62.96 m (206 ft 6 1/2 in) CR	Renetta Sailer	60.94 m (199 ft 11 in)	Kiyomi Parish	59.90 m (196 ft 6 1/4 in)
Javelin throw	Lynda Blutreich	58.52 m (191 ft 11 3/4 in)	Erica Wheeler	57.22 m (187 ft 8 3/4 in)	Nicole Carroll	56.46 m (185 ft 2 3/4 in)
Heptathlon	Kelly Blair LaBounty	6465	DeDee Nathan	6317	Kym Carter	6289

== World Championships qualification ==
=== Automatic byes ===
A total of eight American athletes received automatic byes into the 1997 World Championships in Athletics as a result of their being the defending champions from the 1995 World Championships in Athletics. Michael Johnson qualified in two events and his injury situation largely created the bye rule in the first place. Johnson chose not to defend the 200 metres title, but was able to successfully defend his 400 metres title, a feat equalled by Allen Johnson and John Godina in their respective events. Dan O'Brien also did not defend his title.

- Michael Johnson Men's 200 metres
- Michael Johnson Men's 400 metres
- Allen Johnson: Men's 110 m hurdles
- Derrick Adkins: Men's 400 m hurdles
- Gwen Torrence Women's 100 metres
- Gail Devers Women's 100 m hurdles
- Kim Batten Women's 400 m hurdles
- John Godina: Men's shot put
- Dan O'Brien: Men's decathlon

=== Non-top three selections ===
Karl Paranya did not participate in the 1500m. Pascal Dobert did not participate in the steeplechase. Dan Middleman and 7th place Brad Barquist were the American representatives in the 10,000. Since Allen Johnson and Bryan Bronson received a bye, 4th place Mark Crear and Octavius Terry were allowed to compete in their respective hurdle races. LaMark Carter and no other American achieved the A standard in the triple jump. Breaux Greer didn't achieve the A standard. 4th place, naturalized British Olympian Roald Bradstock did and took the third position at the World Championships.
