= 1998 USA Outdoor Track and Field Championships =

- Host city: New Orleans, Louisiana, United States
- Venue: Tad Gormley Stadium
- Events: 36

The 1998 USA Outdoor Track and Field Championships took place between June 17 and 21 at Tad Gormley Stadium in New Orleans, Louisiana.

== Results ==
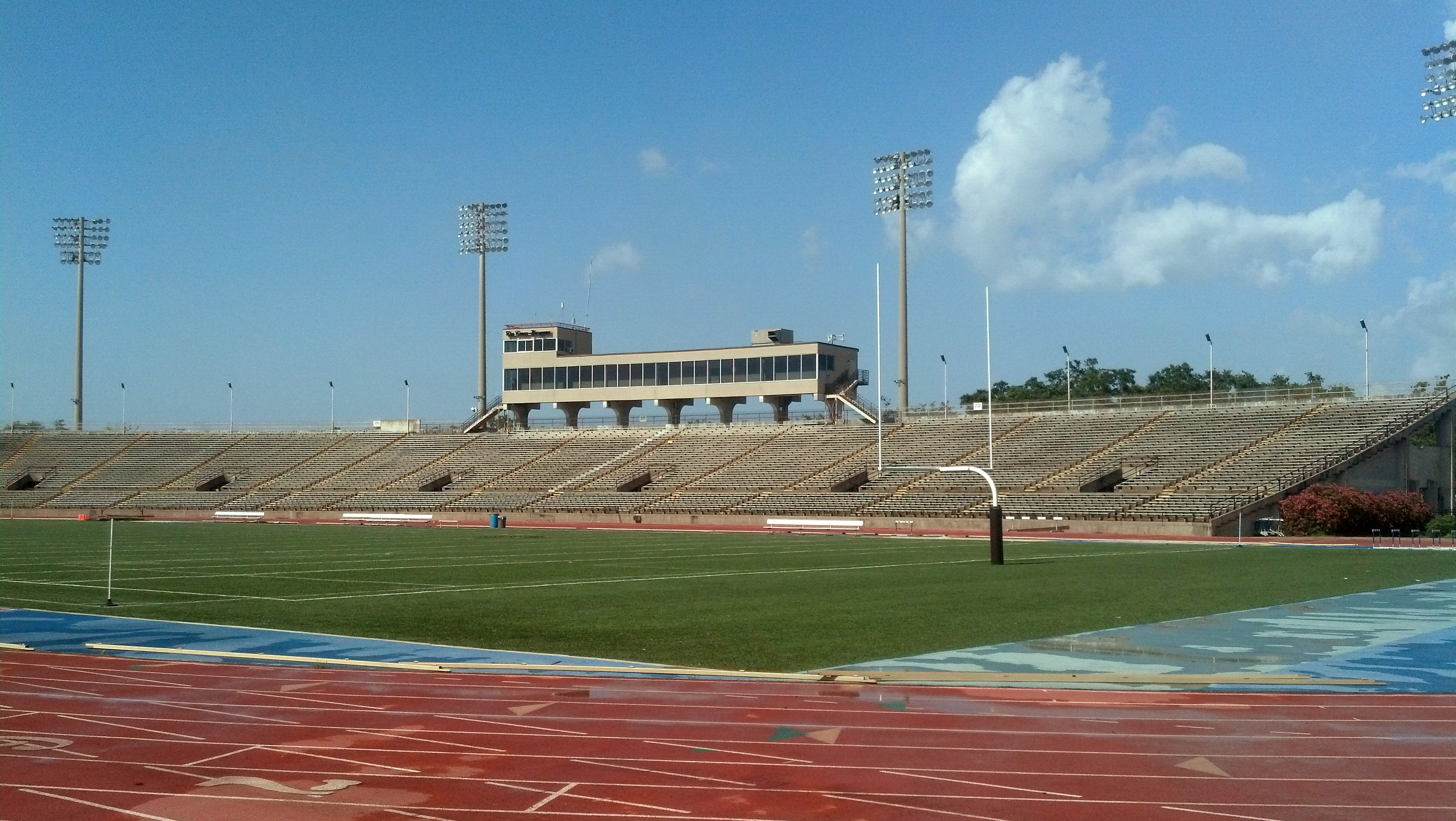
Tad Gormley Stadium hosted the 1998 competition

=== Men track events ===
Event	Gold		Silver		Bronze	
100 meters Wind : +4.9 m/s	Tim Harden	9.88w	Brian Lewis	9.98w	Tim Montgomery	9.99w
200 meters Wind : +1.0 m/s	Gentry Bradley	20.47	Allen Johnson	20.54	Curtis Perry	20.56
400 meters	Jerome Young	44.09	Tyree Washington	44.38	Antonio Pettigrew	44.40
800 meters	Mark Everett	1.45.28	Johnny Gray	1.45.47	Trinity Townsend	1.45.75
1500 meters	Jamey Harris	3.37.99	Jason Pyrah	3.38.77	Paul McMullen	3.39.26
5000 meters	Marc Davis	13.40.62	Alan Culpepper	13.41.13	Pete Julian	13.49.42
10,000 meters	Dan Browne	29.46.06	James Menon	29.47.58	Reuben Reina	29.47.61
3000 m st'chase	Pascal Dobert	8.33.91	Thomas Nohilly	8.37.56	John Mortimer	8.38.62
20 km walk	Tim Seaman	1:35:08	Curt Clausen	1:35:42	Jonathan Matthews	1:35:59
110 m hurdles Wind : +1.0 m/s	Reggie Torian	13.03	Mark Crear	13.06	Dudley Dorival	13.30
400 m hurdles	Bryan Bronson	47.03 MR	Angelo Taylor	47.90	Joey Woody	47.97

=== Men field events ===
Event	Gold		Silver		Bronze	
High jump	Charles Austin	2.30 m (7 ft 6 1/2 in)	Nathan Leeper	2.30 m (7 ft 6 1/2 in)	Brian Brown Hollis Conway	2.25 m (7 ft 4 1/2 in)
Pole vault	Jeff Hartwig	5.85 m (19 ft 2 1/4 in)	Pat Manson	5.74 m (18 ft 9 3/4 in)	Dean Starkey	5.65 m (18 ft 6 1/4 in)
Long jump	Roland McGhee	8.28 m (27 ft 1 3/4 in)	Erick Walder	8.26 m (27 ft 1 in)w	Kevin Dilworth	8.08 m (26 ft 6 in)
Triple jump	LaMark Carter	17.44 m (57 ft 2 1/2 in)	Robert Howard	17.12 m (56 ft 2 in)	Von Ware	16.79 m (55 ft 1 in)
Shot put	John Godina	21.71 m (71 ft 2 1/2 in)	C. J. Hunter	20.84 m (68 ft 4 1/4 in)	Adam Nelson	20.35 m (66 ft 9 in)
Discus throw	John Godina	67.08 m (220 ft 0 in)	Adam Setliff	66.42 m (217 ft 10 in)	Andy Bloom	66.42 m (217 ft 10 in)
Hammer throw	Lance Deal	78.18 m (256 ft 5 3/4 in)	Jud Logan	71.27 m (233 ft 9 in)	Kevin McMahon	69.85 m (229 ft 2 in)
Javelin throw	Tom Pukstys	82.37 m (270 ft 2 in)	Josh Johnson	75.77 m (248 ft 7 in)	Ed Kaminski	75.44 m (247 ft 6 in)
Decathlon	Chris Huffins	8694	Ricky Barker	8183	Brian Brophy	8123

=== Women track events ===
Event	Gold		Silver		Bronze	
100 meters Wind : +2. m/s	Marion Jones	10.72	Chryste Gaines	10.89	Inger Miller	11.12
200 meters Wind : -0.6 m/s	Marion Jones	22.24	Zundra Feagin-Alexander	23.04	Cheryl Taplin	23.07
400 meters	Kim Graham	50.69	Rochelle Stevens	51.07	Monique Hennagan	51.11
800 meters	Jearl Miles Clark	1:58.78	Joetta Clark Diggs	1:59.01	Meredith Valmon	1:59.29
1500 meters	Suzy Favor Hamilton	4:05.28	Amy Wickus	4:07.95	Alisa Harvey	4:08.33
5000 meters	Regina Jacobs	15:32.31	Libbie Hickman	15:39.40	Amy Rudolph	15:41.31
10,000 meters	Lynn Jennings	34:09.86	Jen Rhines	34:10.31	Shelly Steely	34:11.75
Marathon	Gwynneth Coogan	2:33:37	Kim Jones	2:35:44	Linda Somers	2:38:52
3000 m st'chase	Courtney Meldrum	10:21.00	Elizabeth Jackson	10:21.20	Lesley Lehane	10:25.90
20 km walk	Joanne Dow	47:06.5	Michelle Rohl	47:32.7	Debbi Lawrence	48:34.4
100 m hurdles Wind : -1.5 m/s	Cheryl Dickey	12.82	Angie Vaughn	12.88	Miesha McKelvy	12.97
400 m hurdles	Kim Batten	53.61	Michelle Johnson	54.80	Sandra Glover	55.11

=== Women field events ===
Event	Gold		Silver		Bronze	
High jump	Tisha Waller	.94 m (3 ft 1 in)	Amy Acuff	1.94 m (6 ft 4 1/4 in)	Erin Aldrich	1.90 m (6 ft 2 3/4 in)
Pole vault	Kellie Suttle	4.27 m (14 ft 0 in)	Stacy Dragila	4.10 m (13 ft 5 1/4 in)	Kim Becker	4.10 m (13 ft 5 1/4 in)
Long jump	Marion Jones	7.21 m (23 ft 7 3/4 in)w	Shana Williams	6.90 m (22 ft 7 1/2 in)w	Dawn Burrell	6.90 m (22 ft 7 1/2 in)
Triple jump	Sheila Hudson	13.72 m (45 ft 0 in)	Cynthea Rhodes	13.66 m (44 ft 9 3/4 in)	Tiombé Hurd	13.65 m (44 ft 9 1/4 in)
Shot put	Connie Price-Smith	18.67 m (61 ft 3 in)	Teri Steer	18.20 m (59 ft 8 1/2 in)	Tressa Thompson	17.47 m (57 ft 3 3/4 in)
Discus throw	Seilala Sua	62.24 m (204 ft 2 in)	Kris Kuehl	61.28 m (201 ft 0 in)	Aretha Hill	60.48 m (198 ft 5 in)
Hammer throw	Windy Dean	64.12 m (210 ft 4 in) MR	Amy Palmer	63.71 m (209 ft 0 in)	Dawn Ellerbe	63.44 m (208 ft 1 in)
Javelin throw	Nicole Carroll	56.58 m (185 ft 7 in)	Windy Dean	56.23 m (184 ft 5 in)	Lynda Blutreich	56.05 m (183 ft 10 in)
Heptathlon	Kelly Blair LaBounty	6402	Shelia Burrell	6294w	Tiffany Lott-Hogan	6123

== See also ==
- United States Olympic trials (track and field)
