= 1998 IAAF Golden League =

Athletics competition series

The 1998 IAAF Golden League was the first edition of the annual international track and field meeting series, held from 9 July to 5 September. It was contested at six European meetings: the Bislett Games, Golden Gala, Herculis, Weltklasse Zürich, Memorial Van Damme and the Internationales Stadionfest (ISTAF). The series tied in with the 1998 IAAF Grand Prix Final, with the jackpot of US$1,000,000 being decided at that competition. The million-dollar prize represented the single largest prize pot ever in athletics at that point.

The jackpot was available to athletes who won at all of the seven competitions of the series in one of the 12 specified events (7 for men, 5 for women). The jackpot events for 1998 were:

- Men: 100 metres, 400 metres, 1500 metres, 3000/5000/10,000 metres, 400 metres hurdles, triple jump and pole vault
- Women: 100 metres, 400 metres, 1500 metres, 100 metres hurdles and javelin throw

The jackpot winners were Marion Jones (100 metres), Hicham El Guerrouj (1500 metres), Haile Gebrselassie (5000 metres/10,000 metres).

Bryan Bronson, a 400 metres hurdler, was in the running for the prize at a late stage but failed to win at the Grand Prix Final, placing only sixth. Svetlana Masterkova took six wins out of seven in the 1500 m, only being defeated by Gabriela Szabo in Paris. Michael Johnson had five 400 m victories, but did not compete at the first or last meet of the series. Trine Hattestad (women's javelin) and Maksim Tarasov (men's pole vault) each had four wins on the circuit.

== Results ==
=== Men ===
| Event | Bislett Games 9 July | Golden Gala 14 July | Herculis 8 August | Weltklasse Zürich 12 August | Memorial Van Damme 28 August | ISTAF 1 September | Final 5 September |
|---|---|---|---|---|---|---|---|
| 100 m | Frank Fredericks (NAM) 9.95 | Frank Fredericks (NAM) 9.97 | Ato Boldon (TRI) 9.92 | Seun Ogunkoya (NGR) 9.96 | Maurice Greene (USA) 9.94 | Maurice Greene (USA) 9.94 | Frank Fredericks (NAM) 10.11 |
| 200 m | Ato Boldon (TRI) 20.23 | — | — | — | Jon Drummond (USA) 20.15 | — | — |
| 400 m | Mark Richardson (GBR) 44.37 | Michael Johnson (USA) 44.40 | Michael Johnson (USA) 43.96 | Michael Johnson (USA) 43.68 | Michael Johnson (USA) 44.06 | Michael Johnson (USA) 44.62 | Mark Richardson (GBR) 44.88 |
| 800 m | Vebjørn Rodal (NOR) 1:44.17 | Patrick Ndururi (KEN) 1:42.90 | Wilson Kipketer (DEN) 1:43.74 | Japheth Kimutai (KEN) 1:42.87 | Japheth Kimutai (KEN) 1:44.80 | — | — |
| 1500 m Mile run | Hicham El Guerrouj (MAR) 3:29.12 | Hicham El Guerrouj (MAR) 3:26.00 WR | Hicham El Guerrouj (MAR) 3:28.37 | Hicham El Guerrouj (MAR) 3:26.45 | Hicham El Guerrouj (MAR) 3:29.67 | Hicham El Guerrouj (MAR) 3:30.23 | Hicham El Guerrouj (MAR) 3:32.03 |
| 3000 m 5000 m | Haile Gebrselassie (ETH) 7:27.42 | Haile Gebrselassie (ETH) 13:02.63 | Haile Gebrselassie (ETH) 7:25.54 | Haile Gebrselassie (ETH) 12:54.08 | Haile Gebrselassie (ETH) 7:25.09 Assefa Mezegebu (ETH) 12:53.84 | Haile Gebrselassie (ETH) 12:56.52 | Haile Gebrselassie (ETH) 7:50.00 |
| 10,000 m | — | — | — | — | Paul Tergat (KEN) 26:46.44 | — | — |
| 3000 m s'chase | — | Moses Kiptanui (KEN) 8:04.96 | Bernard Barmasai (KEN) 8:00.67 | Bernard Barmasai (KEN) 8:01.98 | — | — | — |
| 110 m hurdles | — | — | Mark Crear (USA) 13.07 | Allen Johnson (USA) 12.98 | Allen Johnson (USA) 13.06 | Allen Johnson (USA) 13.12 | — |
| 400 m hurdles | Bryan Bronson (USA) 47.94 | Bryan Bronson (USA) 47.76 | Bryan Bronson (USA) 47.93 | Bryan Bronson (USA) 47.70 | Bryan Bronson (USA) 48.25 | Bryan Bronson (USA) 48.03 | Stéphane Diagana (FRA) 48.30 |
| Pole vault | Jeff Hartwig (USA) 5.90 | Maksim Tarasov (RUS) 5.85 | Maksim Tarasov (RUS) 5.90 | Maksim Tarasov (RUS) 5.86 | Jeff Hartwig (USA) 5.95 | Jeff Hartwig (USA) 5.86 | Maksim Tarasov (RUS) 5.95 |
| High jump | Artur Partyka (POL) 2.28 | — | — | Sergey Klyugin (RUS) 2.36 | Sergey Klyugin (RUS) 2.28 | Stefan Holm (SWE) 2.28 | Javier Sotomayor (CUB) 2.31 |
| Triple jump | Jonathan Edwards (GBR) 18.01 | Jonathan Edwards (GBR) 17.60 | Denis Kapustin (RUS) 17.39 | Jonathan Edwards (GBR) 17.75 | Denis Kapustin (RUS) 17.00 | Denis Kapustin (RUS) 17.15 | Charles Friedek (GER) 17.33 |
| Shot put | — | Kevin Toth (USA) 20.63 | — | — | — | — | John Godina (USA) 21.21 |
| Discus throw | — | — | — | Lars Riedel (GER) 67.90 | — | Virgilijus Alekna (LIT) 67.84 | — |
| Javelin throw | Aki Parviainen (FIN) 86.00 | — | — | — | Steve Backley (GBR) 84.23 | — | — |
| Hammer throw | — | — | — | — | — | Heinz Weis (GER) 80.8 | Tibor Gécsek (HUN) 81.21 |

=== Women ===
| Event | Bislett Games 9 July | Golden Gala 14 July | Herculis 8 August | Weltklasse Zürich 12 August | Memorial Van Damme 28 August | ISTAF 1 September | Final 5 September |
|---|---|---|---|---|---|---|---|
| 100 m | Marion Jones (USA) 10.82 | Marion Jones (USA) 10.75 | Marion Jones (USA) 10.72 | Marion Jones (USA) 10.77 | Marion Jones (USA) 10.80 | Marion Jones (USA) 10.81 | Marion Jones (USA) 10.83 |
| 200 m | — | — | — | — | Inger Miller (USA) 22.20 | — | — |
| 400 m | Charity Opara (NGR) 50.13 | Charity Opara (NGR) 49.29 | Charity Opara (NGR) 49.88 | Grit Breuer (GER) 49.51 | Falilat Ogunkoya (NGR) 49.60 | Falilat Ogunkoya (NGR) 49.72 | Falilat Ogunkoya (NGR) 49.73 |
| 800 m 1000 m | — | Yelena Afanasyeva (RUS) 1:57.68 | Yelena Afanasyeva (RUS) 1:56.63 | Maria Mutola (MOZ) 1:56.11 | Maria Mutola (MOZ) 2:31.55 | — | — |
| 1500 m Mile run | Svetlana Masterkova (RUS) 4:01.37 | Svetlana Masterkova (RUS) 3:58.42 | Gabriela Szabo (ROM) 3:56.97 | Svetlana Masterkova (RUS) 3:59.83 | Svetlana Masterkova (RUS) 3:58.95 | Svetlana Masterkova (RUS) 4:03.19 | Svetlana Masterkova (RUS)4:03.79 |
| 3000 m 5000 m | — | Zahra Ouaziz (MAR) 14:44.35 | — | — | — | Gabriela Szabo (ROM) 14:31.48 | Gete Wami (ETH) 8:40.11 |
| 100 m hurdles | Melissa Morrison (USA) 12.67 | Angie Vaughn (USA) 12.69 | Glory Alozie (NGR) 12.44 | Michelle Freeman (JAM) 12.52 | Glory Alozie (NGR) 12.44 | Glory Alozie (NGR) 12.72 | Michelle Freeman (JAM) 12.56 |
| 400 m hurdles | — | — | Kim Batten (USA) 52.74 | Kim Batten (USA) 52.84 | Nezha Bidouane (MAR) 53.43 | — | — |
| High jump | — | — | Monica Iagar-Dinescu (ROM) 1.98 | — | — | — | — |
| Long jump | — | Marion Jones (USA) 7.23 | — | Marion Jones (USA) 7.31 | Heike Drechsler (GER) 6.78 | — | Marion Jones (USA) 7.13 |
| Discus throw | — | — | — | — | — | — | Natalya Sadova (RUS) 68.50 |
| Javelin throw | Tanja Damaske (GER) 66.57 | Trine Hattestad (NOR) 67.23 | Trine Hattestad (NOR) 65.71 | Trine Hattestad (NOR) 69.59 | Trine Hattestad (NOR) 66.22 | Tanja Damaske (GER) 68.02 | Tanja Damaske (GER) 68.40 |
