= Angie Vaughn =

American former track and field athlete (born 1976)

Medal record

Women's athletics

Representing the United States

IAAF World Cup
Silver medal – second place	1998 Johannesburg	100 m hurdles

Angie Vaughn (born November 4, 1976) is an American former track and field athlete who specialized in hurdles. She was the 100-meter hurdles winner at the 1998 Goodwill Games and a silver medalist in the event at the 1998 IAAF World Cup. Collegiately, she ran for the Texas Longhorns and was a three-time champion at NCAA-level, winning two hurdles title and one in the relay.

== Career ==
Born in Washington, D.C., she grew up in Maryland and attended Laurel High School. She took up track while there, at the behest of her mother, and became the high school state champion in the 100-meter hurdles and 300-meter hurdles in 1991. She placed third in the 100 m hurdles event at the USATF National Junior Olympic Track & Field Championships in 1993. She graduated from high school in 1994 and went on to attend the University of Texas on an athletic scholarship that same year, majoring in marketing.

At college she worked with coach Bev Kearney in the Texas Longhorns women's track team. In her first major event for the team, she was runner-up in the 55-meter hurdles and 200-meter dash at the indoor Southwest Conference championship. She was a semi-finalist at the NCAA Indoor Championships that season, then made the final the following year. In 1997 she was a double individual finalist at the NCAA Outdoor Championships, coming fourth in the 200 m and seventh in the 100 m hurdles. She ranked among the top ten Americans for those events that season, having set personal records of 23.11 seconds and 13.11 seconds, respectively.

In her final year of college eligibility in 1998, Vaughn had her best performances. At the Big 12 Conference indoor meet, she won the 55 m hurdles, was runner-up over 200 m and also ranked fourth in the 55-meter dash. At the NCAA Indoor Championships she won the 55 m hurdles title in a personal record time of 7.41 seconds. In the outdoor college season she won the 100 m hurdles title at the Big 12 Championships, as well as runner-up finishes in both the 100-meter dash and 200 m. At the NCAA Outdoor Championships she won the individual 100 m hurdles title and the 4 × 100-meter relay title with the Texas Longhorn women.

Vaughn turned professional in the 1998 season and her first year was her most successful. She achieved a 100 m hurdles best of 12.63 seconds in July at the U.S. Open Track and Field and was runner-up at the 1998 USA Outdoor Track and Field Championships behind Cheryl Dickey. There was no Olympics or World Championships in Athletics held that year, but she performed well in other international competitions. On the 1998 IAAF Golden League circuit she won at the Golden Gala in Rome, narrowly beating fellow American Melissa Morrison-Howard. She was the gold medallist at the 1998 Goodwill Games and a silver medallist for the United States at the 1998 IAAF World Cup, finishing behind Glory Alozie of Nigeria. She was down in eighth at the close-of-season 1998 IAAF Grand Prix Final.

Despite her initial success she failed to improve the following year and did not finish the hurdles race at the 1999 USA Outdoor Track and Field Championships. She competed on the international circuit until 2000, at which point she moved back to Washington, D.C. and began working as a law firm recruiter.

== National titles ==
- NCAA Women's Division I Outdoor Track and Field Championships
  - 100 m hurdles: 1998
  - 4 × 100 m relay: 1998
- NCAA Women's Division I Indoor Track and Field Championships
  - 55-meter hurdles: 1998

== International competitions ==
Year	Competition	Venue	Position	Event	Notes
1998	Goodwill Games	Uniondale, New York	1st	100 m hurdles	12.72
1998	World Cup	Johannesburg, South Africa	2nd	100 m hurdles	12.67
1998	IAAF Grand Prix Final	Moscow, Russia	8th	100 m hurdles	13.10
