= Bailey–Johnson 150-metre race =

1997 race in Toronto

The Bailey–Johnson 150-metre race was a track and field event that occurred at SkyDome in Toronto, Ontario on Sunday, 1 June 1997.

In an effort to settle the dispute regarding who was the "world's fastest man", a 150 metres race not sanctioned by IAAF was held at SkyDome between 1996 Olympic 100 metre champion Donovan Bailey from Canada and 1996 Olympic 200 metre and 400 metre champion Michael Johnson from the United States.

== Background ==
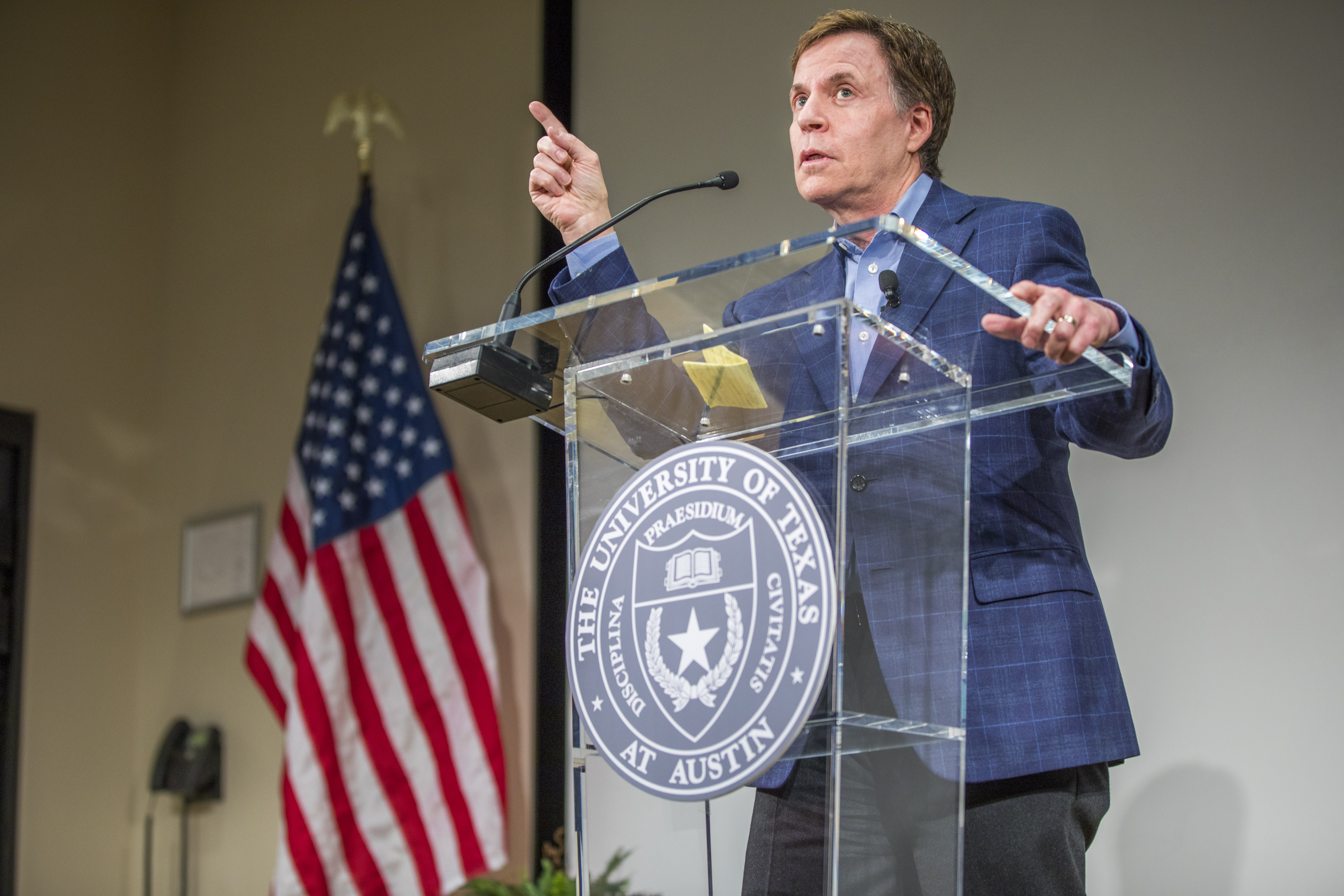
Prominent U.S. sportscaster Bob Costas' national television references to the American 200m Olympic champion Michael Johnson as the "world's fastest man" despite Canada's Donovan Bailey winning the 100m race generated reaction in the two countries that ultimately led to the hybrid 150-metre showdown between the sprinters who normally run in different events.

The unofficial "world's fastest man" title typically goes to the Olympic 100 metre champion. The Olympics 100–200 metre double had been achieved only four times before 1996: in the men's events, by Valeriy Borzov at Munich and Carl Lewis at Los Angeles, and in the women's, by Renate Stecher at Munich and Florence Griffith Joyner at Seoul.

On 1 August 1996, the night of Johnson's 200 m Olympic win, the host of NBC's Olympics coverage Bob Costas stated on-air that Johnson's gold-medal performance in the 200 m (19.32 seconds) was faster than Bailey's 100 m performance (9.84 seconds) five days earlier in that 19.32 divided by two is 9.66. Bailey later dismissed Costas' comments as "a person who knew nothing about track talking about it with a lot of people listening"; nonetheless, the sportscaster's remarks touched a nerve.

The 200 metre time almost always yields a "faster" average speed than a 100-metre race time, since the initial slow speed at the start is spread out over the longer distance. In other words, the second 100 metres is run with a "flying start", without the slow acceleration phase of the first 100 metres and without the greater than 0.10 s reaction time of the start. In fact, each 200 metre gold medalist from 1968, when fully electronic timing was introduced, to 1996 had a "faster" average speed at the Olympics, save one, yet there had been no controversy over the title of "world's fastest man" previously, until Bob Costas' remarks during the 1996 Olympics.

Many in the U.S. media—including Johnson's personal coach, Clyde Hart of Baylor University—used Costas' reasoning as basis for pronouncing Johnson the "world's fastest man". Furthermore, fellow sprinter Ato Boldon—who had competed against both Bailey and Johnson in the 1996 Olympic 100 and 200 metres races, respectively—chimed in to say, with Johnson sitting next him: "I said before, the person who won the 100 meters was the fastest man alive, but I think the fastest man alive is sitting to my left".

Notably in the 1996 edition of the men's 100 metre final, after golds in 1984 and 1988, as well as a bronze in 1992, the Americans had finished out of the medals despite being the hosts. Adding insult to injury, the Canadian team anchored by Bailey also defeated the Americans in the 4 x 100 metre relay. Bailey's accomplishments in the 1996 Summer Olympics, both firsts for Canadians, provided considerable national pride, considering that these are typically the most glamorous events in the Summer Olympics.

Some Canadians saw the American media's promotion of Michael Johnson as the "world's fastest man" as a cynical attempt to lessen Bailey's achievements. It was also seen as reminiscent of the Ben Johnson-Carl Lewis rivalry in the 1980s, a rivalry that was exacerbated at the 1987 World Championships in Rome after Ben Johnson defeated Lewis in the 100 metre final. In defeat, Lewis begun voicing accusations that Ben Johnson was using performance-enhancing drugs, behaviour which was seen as egotistical and lacking humility, despite the accusations later being proven to be true the following year. Some Canadians saw Bailey's 1996 Summer Olympic accomplishments as somewhat redressing Ben Johnson's positive drug test and disqualification at the 1988 Summer Olympics.

== The event ==
=== Idea and initial reaction ===
Throughout August 1996, many Canadians were irate with continual references to Michael Johnson as the "world's fastest man" in the American media. The publisher of a community newspaper in Bailey's hometown of Oakville, Ontario decided to launch a U.S. advertising campaign to promote Donovan Bailey as the world's fastest man by taking out ads in USA Today, a decision that earned him much support from across Canada. As the debate and positioning over the 150-metre race continued at home, the two sprinters were taking part in various meets throughout Europe in their respective disciplines—on 30 August 1996 at the Internationales Stadionfest meet in Berlin, Bailey and Johnson reportedly got into a shouting match. Both incidentally lost their races that day—Bailey to Dennis Mitchell and Johnson to Frankie Fredericks.

Due to the press attention and public interest over the disputed "world's fastest man" claim, the idea for a 150-metre showdown to settle the issue was floated right away. By early September 1996 a California-based promotions company announced it had received an agreement in principle from Johnson for a race in Toronto's SkyDome on 6 October. However, Bailey initially resisted all calls for the event to take place soon after the Olympics, opting instead to compete in track meets across Europe. Back in North America, the issue was a topic of hot debate, especially in Canada where many felt that Bailey should not even entertain the idea of a 150-metre race, seeing the "world's fastest man" title as rightfully his and considering him the one with more to lose in the event of such a showdown.

=== Announcement ===
Over the coming months in the fall of 1996, several offers to stage the 150-metre event came in, the most serious of which were those by Newcastle, England-based company Nova International led by British former distance runner Brendan Foster and the one by an Ottawa-based entity named Magellan Entertainment Group, a small company that up to that point specialized in motivational seminars for corporations. Amid much media speculation, Magellan won the bid in mid November 1996, announcing a US$500,000 appearance fee for each athlete with an additional US$1 million promised for the race winner—a huge purse by track and field standards considering that the most lucrative one-day track meet at the time, Weltklasse Zürich, had a total budget of about US$5 million from which some 200 athletes were being paid. Though no exact date and location for the 150m race had been set, the event was officially announced by a Magellan representative, 29-year-old Giselle Briden, at a press conference held in Toronto on 18 November 1996 with both athletes present and exchanging verbal barbs. A tentative date mentioned at this time was 31 May 1997.

=== Seven-month lead-up ===
The end of the calendar year 1996 brought the usual media summarizing of the sporting achievements during the preceding twelve months. By now well-known figures even outside of sporting bounds, both Johnson and Bailey as well as their upcoming showdown featured prominently in their countries' respective media year-end best-of lists. Predictably, American media celebrated Johnson with the US-based news agency Associated Press voting his Olympic double gold the top story of 1996, while Canadian media extolled Bailey with the country's 126 newspaper editors and broadcast news directors taking part in a vote for the top newsmaker of 1996, and choosing Bailey ahead of Chief of Defence Staff Jean Boyle's Somalia affair-induced resignation and Ontario premier Mike Harris' "Common Sense Revolution" deficit-reduction program. Johnson won the Associated Press' Athlete of the Year award, US Olympic Committee's sportsman-of-the-year award, but notably lost to Tiger Woods for the Sports Illustrated's Sportsman of the Year award, which made Johnson publicly lash out at USA Track & Field executive director Ollan Cassell for "lack of marketing acumen to promote the sport of track and field".

On the other hand, Bailey, the winner of the Canadian Press' athlete-of-the-year award, was unhappy over receiving zero votes for the Associated Press award (by comparison professional wrestler Ric Flair got two votes in the AP vote) and publicly voiced his displeasure. In response, American magazine Sports Illustrated ran a small article headlined "Bailey's Fine Whine", ripping Bailey for his complaints and "noting that Johnson had won two individual gold medals in Atlanta to Bailey's one, and that the American had obliterated the world record in the 200 while Bailey had set a new 100 standard by just .01 of a second" and questioning how Bailey possibly be considered more outstanding than Johnson. Bailey fired back in the Canadian media while also receiving plenty of support from the country's print media columnists.

Amid continuous verbal sparring between the pair of athletes, a made-for-TV, 150-metre race at Toronto's SkyDome was scheduled for Sunday afternoon, 1 June 1997. The 150 metre distance consisted of 75 metres of curved track and a 75-metre straight, a configuration that was unique to this unsanctioned event. Frankie Fredericks of Namibia, who was the four-time Olympic-silver medalist at 100 and 200 metres, voiced his displeasure over not being invited to the Toronto 150 m race. American television rights for the event were sold to CBS only a week before the event for a bargain-basement amount reported to be in the $50,000-75,000 range. CBC purchased the Canadian television rights earlier in March 1997.

The undercard was announced, featuring pole vault duel between Sergey Bubka and Okkert Brits as well as a long jump competition between Jackie Joyner-Kersee and Heike Drechsler.

By early May 1997, Magellan Entertainment Group (fronted by Briden and her partner Salim Khoja) was behind in paying many of the race's organizing costs, with creditors at the company's door. As late as a few days before the race, promotional and financial problems threatened to cancel the event. Clearly in over their heads, Khoja and Briden turned to experienced Toronto deal-maker Edwin "Eddy" Cogan. A financial restructuring was required to ensure payment to Johnson and Bailey, and a bailout of more than $1 million by Cogan was necessary to pay outstanding bills. In essence, in the eleventh hour, Khoja and Briden surrendered the race over to Cogan and his associate Dennis Jewitt who was put in charge of restructuring the event's finances.

Furthermore, the undercard events suffered from numerous no shows—including the world's premier pole vaulter Sergey Bubka, forcing the organizers to come up with last-minute replacement Lawrence Johnson.

On Friday, two days before the race, Bailey examined the track in SkyDome and revealed his shock at its configuration, specifically the tight radius of the turn. The next day he trained at the track and reportedly asked the event organizers to move the finish line 11.8 metres down the track, but was refused for logistical reasons. Bailey complained that the turn was supposed to emulate the wider curve of the outer lanes 7 and 8 on a standard eight-lane track, not the tighter turns of the middle lanes 3 and 4. Bailey also claimed that the first 85 metres of the track were on the curve instead of 75 metres as promised. Nevertheless, he decided to run, but not before putting out a press release early on Sunday before the race, blasting the organizers for "deceitfulness", "egregious miscarriage of the competitive spirit of this competition" while adding that as a result he would be running the race "under mental duress". The runners were positioned with Bailey running in the track's 3rd lane with Johnson in the next outer lane (4th lane).

=== The race ===
Some 30,000 spectators showed up at SkyDome for the main event that featured a five-event undercard, including a performance by the Blues Brothers. The televised event was billed as a competition for the title of "World's Fastest Man" with CBC's seasoned sportscaster Brian Williams presiding over the Canadian network's coverage and CBS deploying Pat O'Brien to Toronto to anchor the U.S. coverage of the event with Tim Ryan calling the race alongside track pundits Craig Masback and Dwight Stones. Bailey was brilliant as he was ahead of Johnson on the curved portion, where it had been assumed that Johnson would have had the advantage. Johnson (losing the race at the time) pulled up at the 110-metre mark, citing an injury to his quadriceps, appearing to grab his quadriceps and then slowed to a stop before squatting on the track in distress.

Towards the end of the race, Bailey looked back at Johnson and waved for him to "come on", believing he had simply quit the race. Five minutes after winning the race while mobbed by reporters, pumped and animated Bailey shot the following into the CBC camera while interviewed by their sideline reporter Mark Lee:

There was never any doubt in my mind that I was the fastest man on the planet and this just proved it. They said I couldn't run a corner, but I always said this is exposing Michael Johnson and the weaknesses in his race. This is just preparation, we're gonna run a couple of twos (200 metres) this year and I plan on meeting him in his event. He didn't pull up—he's a chicken. He didn't pull up at all—he's just a chicken. He's afraid to lose. I think what he should do, we should run this race over again, so I can kick his ass one more time. The bottom line was I had to concentrate on what it is I was given. I support events like this, I just think the organizers should have some knowledge of track and field and respect us as athletes.

On the other hand, a dejected-looking Johnson, the first of the two sprinters to be interviewed post-race by CBS' sideline reporter Michele Tafoya in their live broadcast, explained that he pulled a quad muscle. Asked to comment on claims that are now sure to follow about this clearly proving that Bailey is the world's fastest man, Johnson responded: "Even if I had won it, and I feel very confident that I could have, some people would've said that. Everyone is always entitled to their opinion and, you know, I can't do anything about that".

At a press conference right after, Bailey continued the aggressive manner of his post-race interview: "It's obvious that the gap was going to get bigger and my butt was going to get smaller and smaller as I pulled away from him. He knew he was going to get hammered after the first 30 meters, so he knew he had to pull up. This race was never going to prove who was the fastest in the world. All it was going to do was shut up Michael Johnson." Asked to comment on Bailey's "chicken" remark, Johnson said: "That's saying a lot about what kind of person he is. I'm going to show you what kind of person I am. I'm not going to address that". Another question alluded to Johnson "packing it in" when he fell behind and one more wondered if Johnson had been "genuinely injured" or if he had simply "thrown the race", to which irritated Johnson responded by shooting back, "I hope you're very proud of yourself. And I hope you're very proud of Donovan. You should be."

Bailey finished with a time of 14.99 seconds and walked away with the $1 million prize. Both Bailey and Johnson received a $500,000 appearance fee.

In addition to Canada and the U.S., the race was broadcast in 54 other countries. Several days after the event, CBC released the ratings for its 90-minute coverage of the race, showing stellar viewership rates in Canada with 2.584 million people watching the entire broadcast that included some of the undercard events.

=== Results ===
Rank	Lane	Nation	Athlete	Time	Notes
1	1	Canada	Donovan Bailey	14.99	
2	2	United States	Michael Johnson	DNF	

== Reaction ==
=== Contemporaneous ===
Following the event in Toronto, IAAF president Primo Nebiolo said: "This is not sports as entertainment, but more like something out of a circus. And we're not interested in it". He went on to add: "Some people have already talked about a rematch in Las Vegas. You can forget about that under these conditions. Our federation will not give authorization and without that, you can't do anything".

The Hamilton Spectator's Steve Milton called it a "strange finish to a strange race", adding: "Donovan Bailey was already the fastest man in the world. Only the U.S. television networks and Sports Illustrated—it'll be 'illustrative' to read that jingoistic journal's take on the affair—chose to suggest otherwise. And, in our usual fit of national self- doubt, we Canadians accepted that as at least a legitimate question. For the first time in a century the 100-metre winner was not unanimously considered the planet's fleetest? No wonder Bailey had such a chip on his shoulder about this".

Reporting on the event, The New York Times' Jeré Longman wrote: "The event was billed as a chance to supply much-needed visibility to a moribund sport, but much of the exposure was not what track and field wanted. The sport appears to be in danger of having fans say Who cares? instead of Who won? ... The atmosphere for the five-event undercard was eerily somnolent. This resembled exactly what it was not supposed to -- a standard track meet, with long stretches of inactivity and dead-air time."

Calling it "the sport's most intriguing event in many years that had been entrusted to a comically overmatched smalltime outfit", Sports Illustrated's Tim Layden said "the long-awaited match race turned into a travesty, further wounding an ailing sport". Furthermore, Layden labeled Bob Costas' remarks from a year earlier (about dividing Johnson's 200m time by two in order to pronounce him the "world's fastest man") as "ignorant".

=== Retrospective ===
In 2017—two decades after the 150-metre race versus Johnson—answering a question on how much of the public grudge between the two back in 1996-1997 was real, forty-nine-year-old Bailey said:

Well, it was a battle of testosterone. I don't know Michael. He and I have never gone out to dinner. Never had a beer. But he is a good dude. Certainly it's a guy who has etched his way in the history books as one of the best speed endurance guys in the world. I don't dislike Michael at all. I think there was a dislike, but you know that's what happens when you have two people at the height of their career.

== Aftermath ==
Due to the injury sustained in Toronto, Johnson was unable to compete in the 1997 USA Outdoor Track and Field Championships held a few weeks later in Indianapolis and could thus not qualify for the IAAF World Championships later that summer in Athens.

However, Johnson would still able to compete as the IAAF introduced a new policy of inviting the defending champions to the World Championship in order to avoid losing the star appeal of the double world record holder. Johnson declined to compete in the 200 metres, won by Ato Boldon, but he successfully defended his world title in the 400 metres.

As a result of the loss to Bailey and the emergence of Maurice Greene, Johnson has not made any further claim to the "World's Fastest Man". Greene defeated Bailey to win the 100 metres at the 1997 World Championships.

In February 1998, Bailey reportedly used part of his $1.5 million prize earnings from winning the race to organize a charter plane for his friends to be flown to his native Jamaica for the Reggae Sunsplash music festival.
