= Dino Napier =

American sprinter

Personal information
- Born: November 24, 1969 (age 56)
- Education: Irvin High School; Louisiana State University

Sport
- Sport: Athletics
- Event: Sprinting
Medal record
Representing United States
Men's athletics
Pan American Games
Silver medal – second place	1995 Mar del Plata	4×100 m relay
Military World Games
Gold medal – first place	1995 Rome	200 m
Silver medal – second place	1995 Rome	400 m

Dino Napier (born November 24, 1969) is an American former athlete who competed in sprinting events.

The eldest of four siblings, Napier attended Irvin High School in El Paso, Texas.

Napier, a Louisiana State University (LSU) varsity athlete, came third in the 200 meters at the 1994 USA Outdoor Track and Field Championships. He was attached to the ROTC unit at LSU and ran in events for the US Army, claiming the 200 meters title at the 1995 Military World Games, to go with a silver in the 400 metres. At the 1995 Pan American Games in Mar del Plata, Napier competed in the 100 meters and relay events, taking silver in the 4×100 meters.
