= Jamey Harris =

American Track and Field athlete and coach

Personal information
- Nationality: American
- Born: June 14, 1971 (age 55) Eugene, Oregon, U.S.
- Height: 6 ft 1 in (1.85 m)

Sport
- Sport: Track & Field & Cross Country
- Events: 1500 meters, mile, 800 meters, 3000 meters, 5000 meters
- College team: California State University, Fresno
- Club: Aggies Running Club
- Turned pro: 1994

Achievements and titles
- Regional finals: 1998 Goodwill Games: 4th in men's Mile
- National finals: 1998 USA Outdoor Track & Field Championships: 1st in men's 1500 meter
- Personal bests: 1500 meters: 3:37.99; Mile: 3:54.90; 800 meters: 1:50.38; 3000 meters: 8:21.61; 5000 meters: 14:16.14; 10000 meters: 27:59.31

Jamey Harris (born June 14, 1971) is an American athlete and coach in track and field and cross-country. He is the 1998 USA national champion in the men's 1500 meters and finished fourth in the world in the men's mile at the 1998 Goodwill Games. Jamey Harris is currently Head Coach for Cross Country and Assistant Coach of Track and Field at Humboldt State University.

== Running career ==
=== High school ===
Jamey Harris attended Beaverton High School and graduated in 1989. He won the Oregon State OSAA Boys Cross Country Championships in 1988. At the 1989 Oregon state outdoor championships, Harris placed 5th in the 3000 meters (8:46.77) and 4th in the 1500 meters (4:00.40). Harris was also a member of Beaverton High School's state-record-setting 4x800 Relay team.

=== Collegiate ===
Harris graduated from California State University, Fresno in 1994, earning a degree in exercise science emphasizing biomechanics. While at Fresno, Harris won both the 1991 and 1992 Big West Conference Championships in the 1500 meters and was an All-American in indoor track & field in 1992 and 1994. In cross country, he won the Big West Conference Championship in 1991 and the Western Athletic Conference in 1992.

Harris also competed in the 1990 IAAF World Cross Country Championships on the USA Junior Men's Team, and came in 104th place.

=== Professional ===
Highlights of Harris's professional running career include the following:

- 1998 National Champion in the USA Track & Field Outdoor men's 1500 meters, with a time of 3:37.99.
- Represented the United States the 1998 Goodwill Games, where he came in fourth in the men's mile with a time of 3:55.39, behind Algerian Noureddine Morceli and Kenyans William Tanui and Daniel Komen.
- Ran in the 1996 USA Olympic Trials, where he came in 9th in the men's 1500 meters.

== Coaching career ==
Harris is currently the Head Coach for Cross Country and Assistant Coach of Track and Field at Cal Poly Humboldt University, since September 2017. Harris served as Head Coach for both Track & Field and Cross Country at University of California, Santa Cruz (UCSC), from 2014 to 2017. Before that, he was Assistant Coach at UCSC for four years. He simultaneously served as head track coach at Pacific Collegiate School for 3 years.

During his time at UCSC, Harris was a three-time winner of the Division III Association of Independents Coach of the Year award, for women's cross country. He oversaw a major expansion of the UCSC Track & Field and Cross Country programs, from being Cross Country only, to adding a Women's Track Team in 2012 that consisted exclusively of distance runners, to adding a Men's Track Team in 2015, to both teams competing in all events. In the 2017 Outdoor Track season, UCSC for the first time sponsored full varsity squads for both men and women that competed in all event groups.

Before UCSC, Harris was an Assistant Cross Country Coach for Auburn University, while he pursued his Masters and PhD in exercise physiology. He also previously served as a Volunteer Assistant Coach at Fresno State, his alma mater.
