= Athletics at the 1998 Goodwill Games =

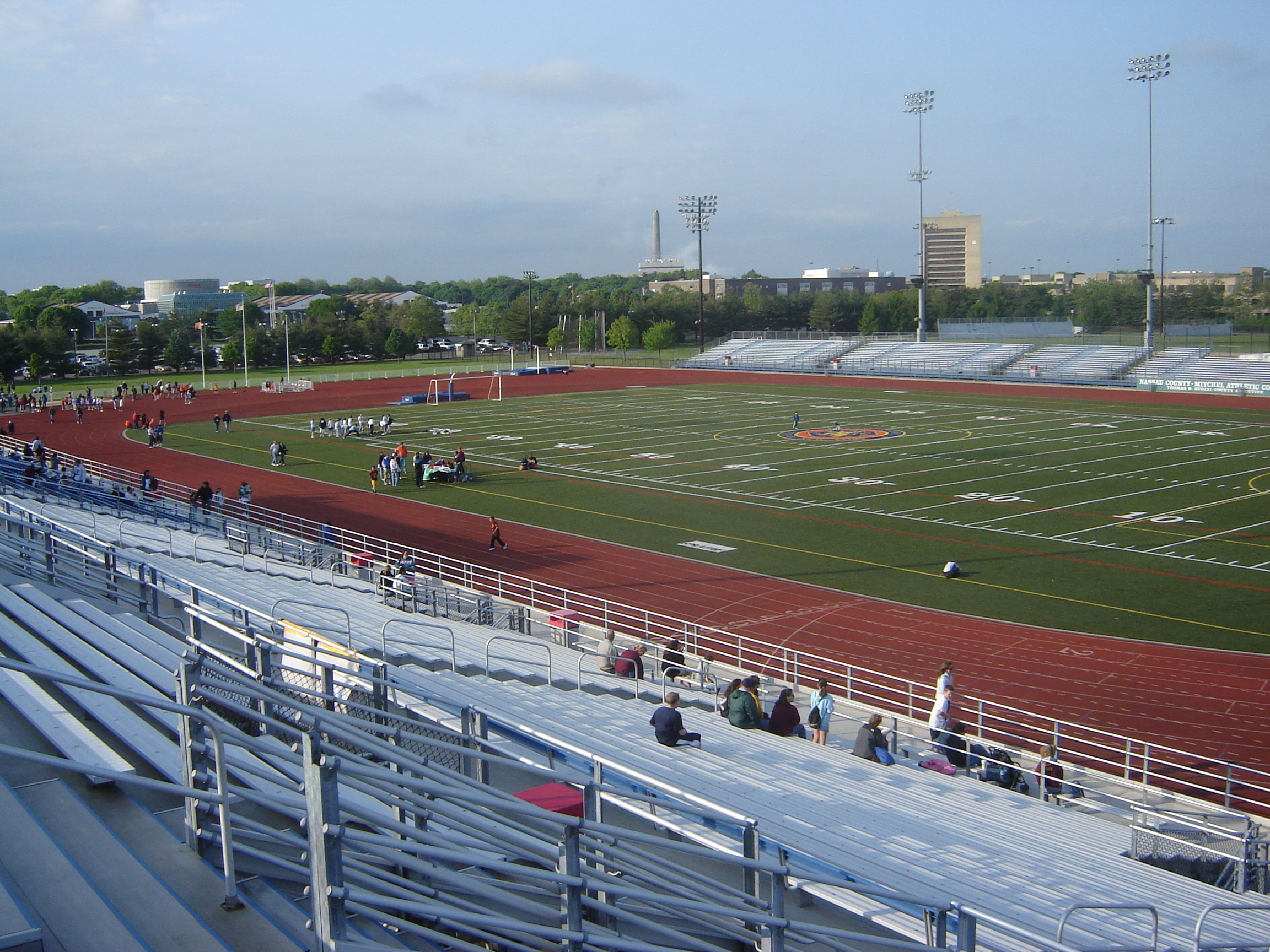
- The athletics events were held at the Mitchel Athletic Complex
- Dates: 19–22 July 1998
- Host city: Uniondale, New York, United States
- Venue: Mitchel Athletic Complex
- Events: 44
- Participation: 354 athletes from 38 nations
- Records set: 1 world record 16 Games records

At the 1998 Goodwill Games, the athletics events were held at the Mitchel Athletic Complex in Uniondale, New York, United States from 19 to 22 July. The programme consisted of 44 track and field events, of which 22 were contested by male athletes and 22 by female athletes. With the introduction of the women's hammer throw and mile run, the men's and women's programmes achieved equivalent parity for the first time. The United States topped the athletics medal table for a third consecutive edition winning 17 gold medals and 55 medals in total. Russia were the next best performing nation, with 11 golds and 21 medals. Kenya, Cuba and Jamaica rounded out the top-five countries.

As in previous editions, the competition was by invitation only and events were contested in a single final format. Significant prize money was available to athletes, with some event winners receiving US$40,000, and world record breaking performances were worth $120,000. One world record was broken at the competition – an American team comprising Jerome Young, Antonio Pettigrew, Tyree Washington and Michael Johnson improved the 4 × 400 metres relay record. Sixteen Goodwill Games records were set over the course of the four-day competition. Athletes from the United States filled the podium in five separate events: the women's heptathlon and the men's 400 m, 110 metres hurdles, 400 metres hurdles and shot put.

Marion Jones won the women's 100 metres and 200 metres in Games record time, beating Zhanna Pintusevich on both occasions. Jackie Joyner-Kersee won a fourth consecutive heptathlon title at the Goodwill Games in what was the last competitive outing of her career. Jearl Miles Clark took two silver medals in the 400 metres and 800 metres. Tyree Washington won 200 and 400 m silvers before breaking the world record in the relay. Dan O'Brien, completing his first decathlon since his 1996 Olympic gold, won the event with a games record score.

== Records ==
Name	Event	Country	Record	Type
Jerome Young; Antonio Pettigrew; Tyree Washington; Michael Johnson	4 × 400 metres relay	United States	2:54.20	WR
Key:WR — World record • AR — Area record • GR — Games record • NR — National record

Note: The IAAF announced on 12 August 2008 that they had rescinded this record after Antonio Pettigrew admitted to using human growth hormone and EPO between 1997 and 2003. Jerome Young tested positive for performance-enhancing drugs in 2004.

== Medal summary ==
=== Men ===
Event	Gold		Silver		Bronze	
100 metres	Maurice Greene (USA)	9.96	Ato Boldon (TRI)	10.00	Brian Lewis (USA)	10.25
200 metres	Ato Boldon (TRI)	20.15	Tyree Washington (USA)	20.29	Claudinei da Silva (BRA)	20.81
400 metres	Michael Johnson (USA)	43.76 GR	Tyree Washington (USA)	44.43	Antonio Pettigrew (USA)	~~44.78~~
800 metres	Patrick Ndururi (KEN)	1:45.30	Norberto Téllez (CUB)	1:45.92	David Kiptoo (KEN)	1:46.05
One mile	Noureddine Morceli (ALG)	3:53.39	William Tanui (KEN)	3:54.05	Daniel Komen (KEN)	3:54.78
5000 metres	Luke Kipkosgei (KEN)	13:20.27	Khalid Boulami (MAR)	13:20.66	Tom Nyariki (KEN)	13:23.34
10,000 metres	Julius Gitahi (KEN)	27:49.26	Simon Maina (KEN)	27:49.65	James Koskei (KEN)	28:51.02
110 metres hurdles	Mark Crear (USA)	13.06 GR	Allen Johnson (USA)	13.10	Reggie Torian (USA)	13.16
400 metres hurdles	Bryan Bronson (USA)	47.15 GR	Angelo Taylor (USA)	47.92	Joey Woody (USA)	48.59
3000 metres steeplechase	Bernard Barmasai (KEN)	8:14.26 GR	John Kosgei (KEN)	8:18.04	Brahim Boulami (MAR)	8:20.00
4 × 100 metres relay	United States (USA); Jon Drummond; Tim Harden; Dennis Mitchell; Maurice Greene	37.90 GR	Canada (CAN); Brad McCuaig; Glenroy Gilbert; Bruny Surin; Donovan Bailey	38.23	Cuba (CUB); Alfredo García-Baró; Misael Ortiz; Luis Pérez; Anier García	39.34
4 × 400 metres relay	United States (USA); Jerome Young; Antonio Pettigrew; Tyree Washington; Michael Johnson	~~2:54.20 GR WR~~	Poland (POL); Piotr Rysiukiewicz; Tomasz Czubak; Piotr Haczek; Robert Maćkowiak	2:58.00 NR	Jamaica (JAM); Gregory Haughton; Michael McDonald; Michael Blackwood; Davian Clarke	2:58.33
20,000 m track walk	Ilya Markov (RUS)	1:23:29.7	Daniel García (MEX)	1:25:52.3	Jefferson Pérez (ECU)	1:29:18.4
High jump	Javier Sotomayor (CUB)	2.33 m	Charles Austin (USA)	2.33 m	Brian Brown (USA)	2.29 m
Pole vault	Jeff Hartwig (USA)	6.01 m GR=	Jean Galfione (FRA)	5.80 m	Pat Manson (USA)	5.70 m
Long jump	Iván Pedroso (CUB)	8.54 m	Erick Walder (USA)	8.38 m	James Beckford (JAM)	8.34 m
Triple jump	Jonathan Edwards (GBR)	17.65 m	Yoelbi Quesada (CUB)	17.27 m	LaMark Carter (USA)	17.07 m
Shot put	John Godina (USA)	21.45 m	C. J. Hunter (USA)	20.79 m	Adam Nelson (USA)	20.39 m
Discus throw	Dmitriy Shevchenko (RUS)	64.81 m	Andy Bloom (USA)	63.97 m	John Godina (USA)	62.84 m
Hammer throw	Vasiliy Sidorenko (RUS)	80.89 m	Lance Deal (USA)	78.13 m	Ilya Konovalov (RUS)	77.10 m
Javelin throw	Sergey Makarov (RUS)	84.11 m	Tom Pukstys (USA)	79.86 m	Andrew Currey (AUS)	78.50 m
Decathlon	Dan O'Brien (USA)	8755 pts GR	Chris Huffins (USA)	8576 pts	Tomáš Dvořák (CZE)	8428 pts

=== Women ===
Event	Gold		Silver		Bronze	
100 metres	Marion Jones (USA)	10.90 GR	Zhanna Pintusevich (UKR)	11.09	Inger Miller (USA)	11.18
200 metres	Marion Jones (USA)	21.80 GR	Zhanna Pintusevich (UKR)	22.46	Beverly McDonald (JAM)	22.67
400 metres	Falilat Ogunkoya (NGR)	49.89 GR	Jearl Miles Clark (USA)	50.43	Sandie Richards (JAM)	50.98
800 metres	Maria Mutola (MOZ)	1:58.83	Jearl Miles Clark (USA)	1:59.08	Joetta Clark (USA)	2:00.02
One mile	Svetlana Masterkova (RUS)	4:20.39 GR	Regina Jacobs (USA)	4:20.93	Suzy Favor-Hamilton (USA)	4:22.93
5000 metres	Olga Yegorova (RUS)	15:53.05	Libbie Hickman (USA)	15:54.93	Lyubov Kremlyova (RUS)	16:00.20
10,000 metres	Tegla Loroupe (KEN)	32:15.44	Sally Barsosio (KEN)	32:50.16	Dong Yanmei (CHN)	32:59.85
100 metres hurdles	Angie Vaughn (USA)	12.72	Gillian Russell (JAM)	12.78	Michelle Freeman (JAM)	12.85
400 metres hurdles	Deon Hemmings (JAM)	54.20	Debbie-Ann Parris (JAM)	54.49	Kim Batten (USA)	54.62
3000 metres steeplechase	Svetlana Rogova (RUS)	9:57.62	Daniela Petrescu (ROM)	9:58.28	Lesley Lehane (USA)	10:08.29
4 × 100 metres relay	United States (USA); Cheryl Taplin; Chryste Gaines; Angie Vaughn; Carlette Guidry	42.06 GR	Bahamas (BAH); Savatheda Fynes; Chandra Sturrup; Debbie Ferguson; Pauline Davis	42.19	Russia (RUS); Yekaterina Leshcheva; Galina Malchugina; Natalya Voronova; Oksana Ekk	42.62
4 × 400 metres relay	Jamaica (JAM); Charmaine Howell; Sandie Richards; Tracey Barnes; Deon Hemmings	3:24.76	United States (USA); Toya Brown; Rochelle Stevens; Monique Hennagan; Kim Graham	3:24.81	Russia (RUS); Tatyana Chebykina; Tatyana Sautkina; Yekaterina Bakhvalova; Irina Rosikhina	3:25.58
10,000 m track walk	Yelena Nikolayeva (RUS)	43:51.97	Nadezhda Ryashkina (RUS)	44:25.99	Joanne Dow (USA)	45:36.92
High jump	Tisha Waller (USA)	1.97 m	Amy Acuff (USA); Yuliya Lyakhova (RUS)	1.93 m	Not awarded	
Pole vault	Yelena Belyakova (RUS)	4.38 m GR	Emma George (AUS)	4.30 m	Vala Flosadóttir (ISL)	4.20 m
Long jump	Shana Williams (USA)	6.93 m (w)	Lyudmila Galkina (RUS)	6.85 m (w)	Niki Xanthou (GRE)	6.84 m (w)
Triple jump	Šárka Kašpárková (CZE)	14.76 m GR	Tatyana Lebedeva (RUS)	14.14 m	Tiombé Hurd (USA)	13.63 m
Shot put	Irina Korzhanenko (RUS)	19.94 m	Connie Price-Smith (USA)	19.46 m	Valentina Fedyushina (RUS)	19.07 m
Discus throw	Natalya Sadova (RUS)	65.80 m	Ilke Wyludda (GER)	63.03 m	Kris Kuehl (USA)	61.84 m
Hammer throw	Mihaela Melinte (ROM)	72.64 m GR	Olga Kuzenkova (RUS)	70.98 m	Amy Palmer (USA)	66.33 m
Javelin throw	Joanna Stone (AUS)	66.29 m	Isel López (CUB)	63.72 m	Sonia Bisset (CUB)	62.64 m
Heptathlon	Jackie Joyner-Kersee (USA)	6502 pts	DeDee Nathan (USA)	6479 pts	Kelly Blair LaBounty (USA)	6465 pts

== Medal table ==
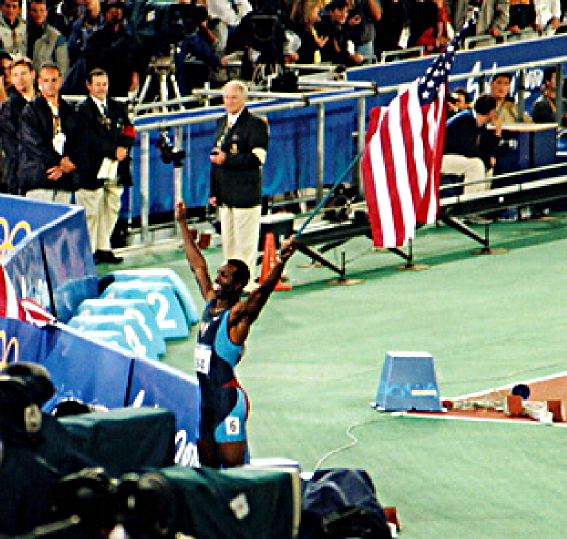
Michael Johnson set records to win the 400 m and relay.

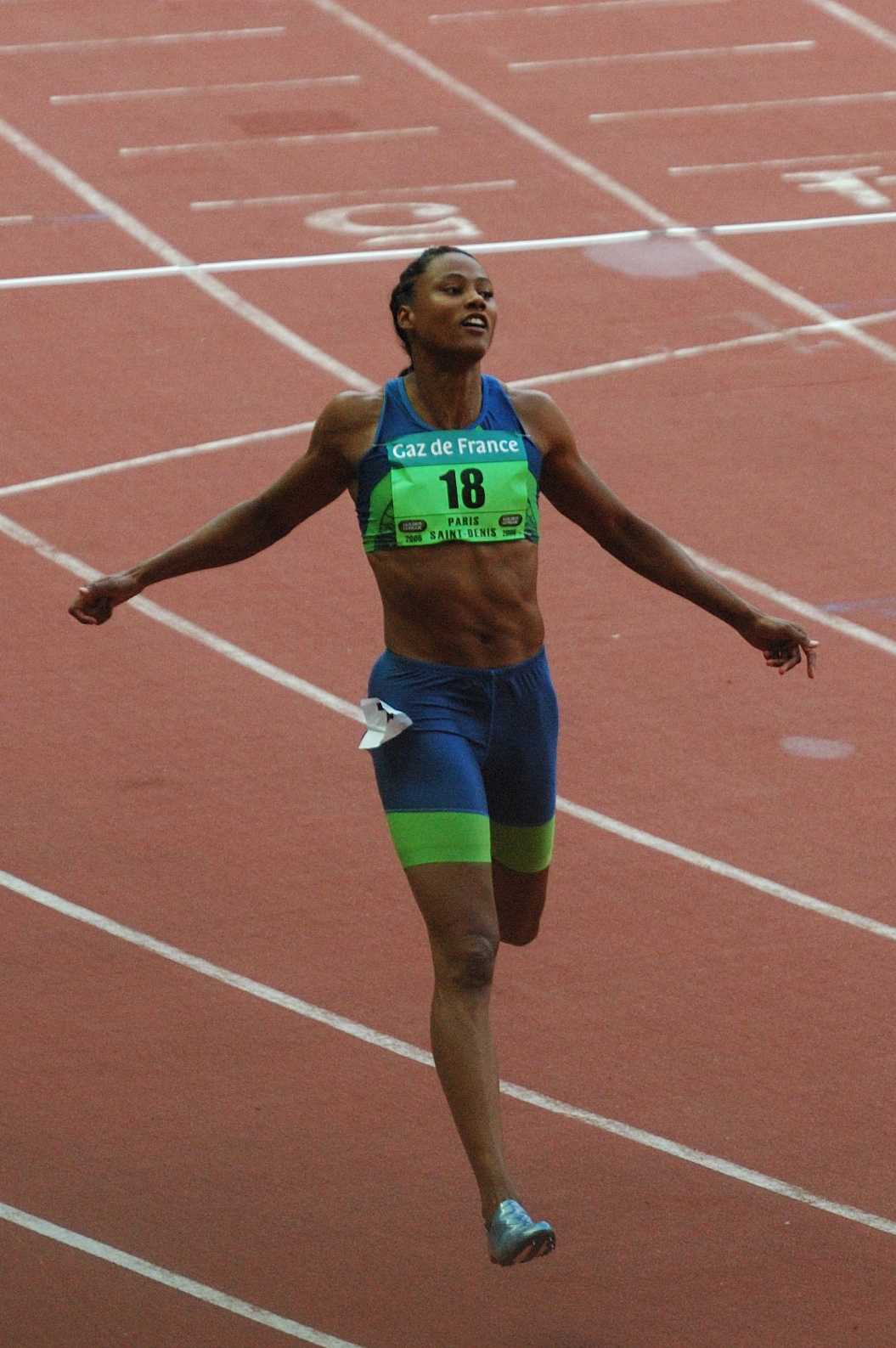
Marion Jones broke two Games records to win the 100 m and 200 ;m golds.

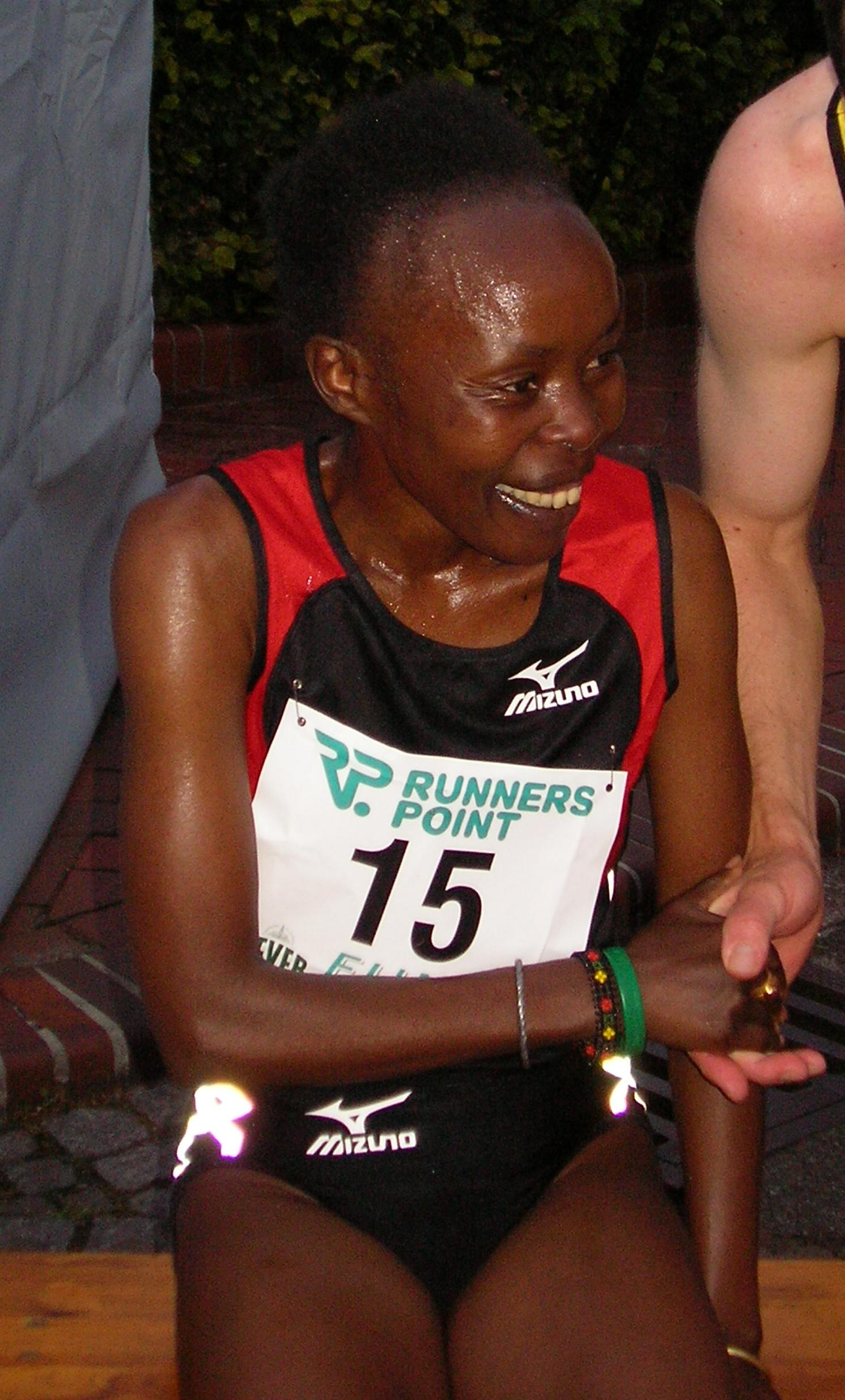
Kenyan Tegla Loroupe retained her 10,000 m title.

* Host nation (United States)

Rank	Nation	Gold	Silver	Bronze	Total
1	United States*	17	19	19	55
2	Russia	11	5	5	21
3	Kenya	5	4	4	13
4	Cuba	2	3	2	7
5	Jamaica	1	2	5	8
6	Australia	1	1	1	3
7	Romania	1	1	0	2
7	Trinidad and Tobago	1	1	0	2
9	Czech Republic	1	0	1	2
10	Algeria	1	0	0	1
10	Great Britain	1	0	0	1
10	Mozambique	1	0	0	1
10	Nigeria	1	0	0	1
14	Ukraine	0	2	0	2
15	Morocco	0	1	1	2
16	Bahamas	0	1	0	1
16	Canada	0	1	0	1
16	France	0	1	0	1
16	Germany	0	1	0	1
16	Mexico	0	1	0	1
16	Poland	0	1	0	1
22	Brazil	0	0	1	1
22	China	0	0	1	1
22	Ecuador	0	0	1	1
22	Greece	0	0	1	1
22	Iceland	0	0	1	1
Totals (26 entries)		44	45	43	132

== Participation ==
- Algeria (3)
- American Samoa (1)
- Australia (9)
- Bahamas (5)
- Belarus (1)
- Brazil (1)
- Canada (10)
- China (6)
- Cuba (11)
- Czech Republic (3)
- Dominica (1)
- Ecuador (1)
- Estonia (2)
- Finland (1)
- France (2)
- Germany (5)
- Great Britain (4)
- Greece (1)
- Iceland (1)
- Ireland (3)
- Jamaica (22)
- Japan (1)
- Kenya (15)
- Lithuania (1)
- Mexico (4)
- Morocco (2)
- Mozambique (1)
- New Zealand (1)
- Nigeria (2)
- Norway (1)
- Poland (5)
- Romania (2)
- Russia (58)
- Slovenia (1)
- Trinidad and Tobago (2)
- Ukraine (5)
- United States (159)
- Zambia (1)
