= Track and field at the 1995 Military World Games =

Track and field at the I Military World Games
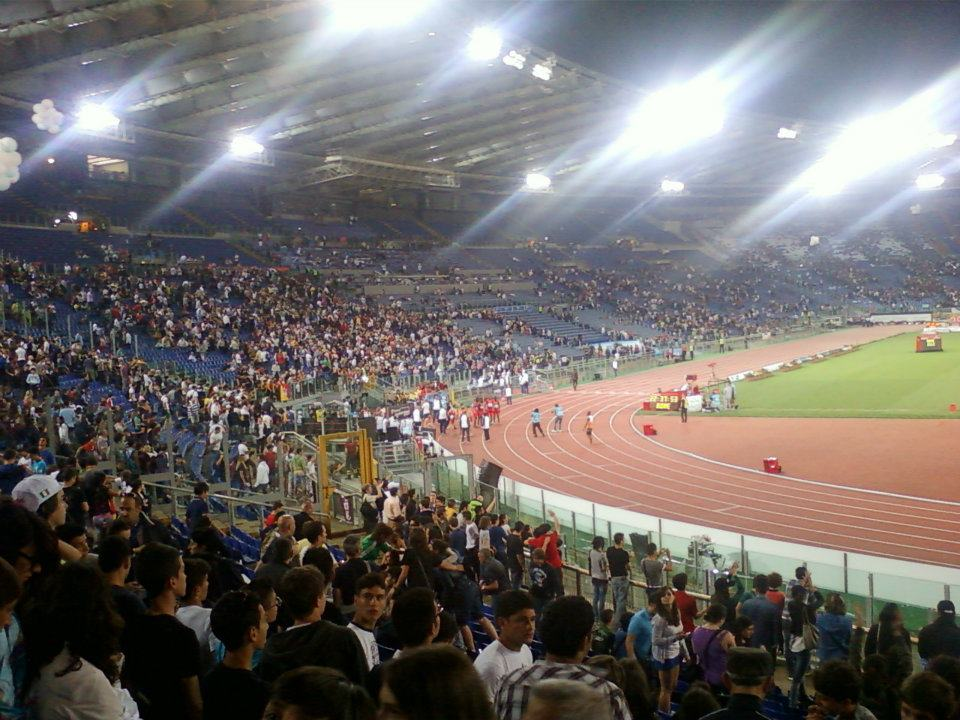
- The host stadium for the track and field events
- Dates: September 1995
- Host city: Rome, Italy
- Venue: Stadio Olimpico
- Level: Military personnel
- Events: 30

At the 1995 Military World Games, the track and field events were held at the Stadio Olimpico in Rome, Italy in September 1995. A total of thirty events were contested, of which 22 by male and 8 by female athletes.

Russia easily topped the medal table with ten golds among its total of nineteen medals, including particular success in the women's events where the nation won six of the eight available. The host nation, Italy, was the next most successful with four medals of each colour. It was closely followed by two other nations with twelve medals: Kenya (also four golds) and Ukraine (three golds and six silvers). Twenty countries reached the medal table in the athletics programme. Twelve new CISM records were set, covering athletics events between military athletes.

Dino Napier of the United States was the most successful athlete of the tournament, being the only multiple individual medallist with his 200 metres gold medal and 400 metres silver. High-profile athletes at the competition included Paul Tergat (World Cross Country champion that year), Ismael Kirui (who repeated his 5000 m world championships win a month earlier), the 20 km race walk world champion Michele Didoni, pole vault world medallist Jean Galfione and javelin world medallist Boris Henry. Polish racewalker Robert Korzeniowski—silver medallist here—went on to win four Olympic gold medals.

== Medal summary ==
=== Men ===
Event	Gold		Silver		Bronze	
100 metres	Andrey Grigoryev (RUS)	10.40	Giovanni Puggioni (ITA)	10.50	Donald Onchiri (KEN)	10.61
200 metres	Dino Napier (USA)	20.74	Ezio Madonia (ITA)	20.94	Angelo Cipolloni (ITA)	21.00
400 metres	Julius Chepkwony (KEN)	45.75	Dino Napier (USA)	45.96	Patrick Ndururi (KEN)	46.02
800 metres	Philip Kibitok (KEN)	1:45.63	Sammy Langat (KEN)	1:45.70	Boniface Kamaru (KEN)	1:45.86
1500 metres	Azzeddine Seddiki (MAR)	3:38.19	Stephen Kipkorir (KEN)	3:39.70	Samir Benfarès (FRA)	3:40.09
5000 metres	Shem Kororia (KEN)	13:27.14	Paul Tergat (KEN)	13:27.44	Ismael Kirui (KEN)	13:33.12
10,000 metres	Zeki Öztürk (TUR)	28:19.77	Alyan Al-Qahtani (KSA)	28:24.40	Mustapha Bamouh (MAR)	28:25.25
110 metres hurdles	Igor Kováč (SVK)	13.52	Sven Göhler (GER)	13.58	Claude Edorh (GER)	13.78
400 metres hurdles	Ruslan Mashchenko (RUS)	49.33	Fabrizio Mori (ITA)	49.40	Laurent Ottoz (ITA)	49.46
3000 metres steeplechase	Saad Al-Asmari (KSA)	8:14.13	Angelo Carosi (ITA)	8:18.85	Joseph Keter (KEN)	8:22.55
4×100 metres relay	Italy (ITA); Milko Campus; Ezio Madonia; Angelo Cipolloni; Sandro Floris	40.20	Thailand (THA)	40.59	Saudi Arabia (KSA)	40.62
4×400 metres relay	Kenya (KEN); Kipchirchir Yego; Patrick Ndururi; Philip Kibitok; Julius Chepkwony	3:04.24	Poland (POL); Piotr Rysiukiewicz; Robert Maćkowiak; Tomasz Jędrusik; Sylwester Węgrzyn	3:04.58	Italy (ITA)	3:05.58
Marathon	Francesco Ingargiola (ITA)	2:14:53	Pascal Blanchard (FRA)	2:17:12	Waldemar Lisicki (POL)	2:19:21
20 km walk	Michele Didoni (ITA)	1:22:43	Robert Korzeniowski (POL)	1:22:59	Ilya Markov (RUS)	1:23:03
High jump	Ettore Ceresoli (ITA)	2.26 m	Sergey Klyugin (RUS)	2.24 m	Viacheslav Tyrtyshnik (UKR)	2.21 m
Pole vault	Jean Galfione (FRA)	5.70 m	Viktor Chistiakov (RUS)	5.50 m	Aleksandr Averbukh (RUS)	5.50 m
Long jump	Bogdan Tudor (ROM)	8.05 m	Andrey Ignatov (RUS)	8.00 m	Ivaylo Mladenov (BUL)	7.95 m
Triple jump	Denis Kapustin (RUS)	16.68 m	Vladimir Kravchenko (UKR)	16.44 m	Piotr Weremczuk (POL)	16.30 m
Shot put	Oleksandr Bagach (UKR)	19.85 m	Roman Virastyuk (UKR)	18.73 m	Yevgeny Palchikov (RUS)	18.50 m
Discus throw	Volodymyr Zinchenko (UKR)	60.98 m	Jo Van Daele (BEL)	59.04 m	Aleksandr Borichevskiy (RUS)	59.02 m
Hammer throw	Aleksandr Seleznyov (RUS)	77.72 m	Vadim Grabovoy (UKR)	75.46 m	Vitaliy Alisevich (BLR)	74.58 m
Javelin throw	Boris Henry (GER)	84.80 m	Andrey Moruyev (RUS)	83.42 m	Konstadinos Gatsioudis (GRE)	82.70 m

=== Women ===
Event	Gold		Silver		Bronze	
100 metres	Yekaterina Leshcheva (RUS)	11.46	Gabi Rockmeier (GER)	11.77	Dokjun Dokduang (THA)	12.09
400 metres	Tatyana Zakharova (RUS)	52.62	Tatyana Kurochkina (BLR)	53.43	Tamara Kupriyanovich (BLR)	53.62
800 metres	Irina Samorokova (RUS)	2:03.31	Zhang Meng (CHN)	2:03.35	Natalya Dukhnova (BLR)	2:03.90
3000 metres	Tatyana Belovol (UKR)	8:52.02	Svetlana Miroshnik (UKR)	8:58.08	Elisa Rea (ITA)	8:59.03
Marathon	Mun Gyong-ae (PRK)	2:38:59	Pak Song-ok (PRK)	2:45:44	Callie Molloy (USA)	2:53:36
High jump	Tatyana Motkova (RUS)	2.00 m	Monica Iagăr (ROM)	1.89 m	Iryna Mykhalchenko (UKR)	1.83 m
Long jump	Olga Rublyova (RUS)	6.71 m	Olena Khlopotnova (UKR)	6.55 m	Viktoriya Vershynina (UKR)	6.55 m
Shot put	Irina Khudoroshkina (RUS)	18.67 m	Valentina Fedyushina (UKR)	18.57 m	Irina Korzhanenko (RUS)	18.50 m

== Medal table ==
* Host nation (Italy)

Rank	Nation	Gold	Silver	Bronze	Total
1	Russia	10	4	5	19
2	Italy*	4	4	4	12
3	Kenya	4	3	5	12
4	Ukraine	3	6	3	12
5	Germany	1	2	1	4
6	France	1	1	1	3
6	Saudi Arabia	1	1	1	3
6	United States	1	1	1	3
9	North Korea	1	1	0	2
9	Romania	1	1	0	2
11	Morocco	1	0	1	2
12	Slovakia	1	0	0	1
12	Turkey	1	0	0	1
14	Poland	0	2	2	4
15	Belarus	0	1	3	4
16	Thailand	0	1	1	2
17	Belgium	0	1	0	1
17	China	0	1	0	1
19	Bulgaria	0	0	1	1
19	Greece	0	0	1	1
Totals (20 entries)		30	30	30	90
