= Matt LaBounty =

American football player (born 1969)

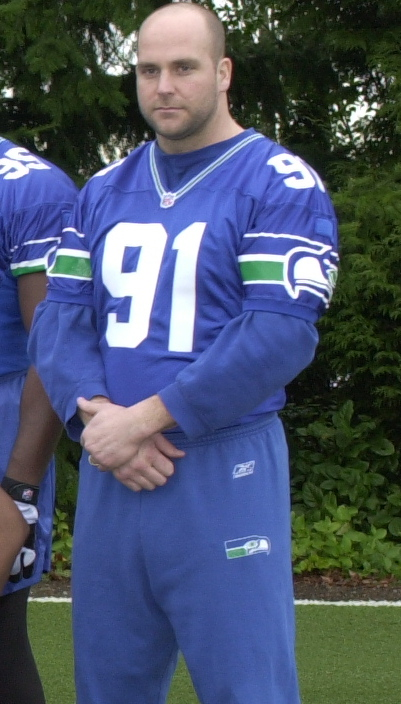
- LaBounty with the Seattle Seahawks in 2002

No. 93, 97, 67, 99, 91
- Position: Defensive end

Personal information
- Born: January 3, 1969 (age 57); San Francisco, California, U.S.
- Listed height: 6 ft 5 in (1.96 m)
- Listed weight: 255 lb (116 kg)

Career information
- High school: San Marin (Novato, California)
- College: Oregon
- NFL draft: 1992: 12th round, 327th overall pick

Career history
- San Francisco 49ers (1992–1993); Green Bay Packers (1993–1995); Seattle Seahawks (1996–2001)

Awards and highlights
- Second-team All-Pac-10 (1990)

Career NFL statistics
- Tackles: 101
- Sacks: 14.5
- Fumble recoveries: 1
- Stats at Pro Football Reference

Matthew James LaBounty (born January 3, 1969) is an American former professional football player who played defensive end in the National Football League (NFL). He now lives in Eugene with his wife, Kelly Blair LaBounty (former assistant track and field coach for the University of Oregon and former Olympian) and sons, Jacob and Lucas.

Since 2009, LaBounty has worked at Thurston High School in Springfield, Oregon, as a wood shop teacher.
