= Karl Paranya =

American distance runner (born 1975)

Personal information
- Born: June 27, 1975 (age 51) Unadilla, New York, United States

Sport
- Sport: Track and field

Karl Paranya (born June 27, 1975) was the first NCAA Division III track and field athlete to break 4 minutes for the mile. He did this in the spring of 1997, running 3:57.6 on Haverford College's outdoor track. Marcus O'Sullivan, one of three men ever to run over 100 sub-4 minute miles, paced Paranya in the run.

== Early life ==
Karl Paranya is from Unadilla, New York.

== Record for men's 4x800 relay ==
On February 6, 2000, at the Boston Indoor Games, Paranya, along with Joey Woody, Rich Kenah and David Krummenacker set a current Indoor World Record in the men's 4x800-meter relay, posting a time of 7:13.94. This record cut nearly four seconds off the previous mark, held by the Soviet Union for nearly thirty years. At the date this addendum was written, Paranya's best time in the mile was 3:54.83 posted on May 30, 1999, in Eugene Oregon, the 225th fastest mile in history.

== Olympics ==
He ran in the 1996 and 2000 United States Olympic Trials (track and field).
