= 1998 IAAF Grand Prix Final =

- Host city: Moscow, Russia
- Events: 18
- Dates: 5 September
- Main venue: Luzhniki Stadium

The 1998 IAAF Grand Prix Final was the fourteenth edition of the season-ending competition for the IAAF Grand Prix track and field circuit, organised by the International Association of Athletics Federations. It was held on 5 September at the Luzhniki Stadium in Moscow, Russia.

Hicham El Guerrouj (1500 metres) and Marion Jones (100 metres and long jump) were the overall points winners of the tournament. A total of 18 athletics events were contested, ten for men and eight for women.

The event served as the final competition of the newly created 1998 IAAF Golden League. This was the only time that the Grand Prix Final served as the jackpot-deciding competition of that series.

== Medal summary ==
=== Men ===
Event	Gold		Silver		Bronze	
Overall	Hicham El Guerrouj (MAR)	136	Haile Gebrselassie (ETH)	114	Bryan Bronson (USA)	97
100 metres	Frankie Fredericks (NAM)	10.11	Obadele Thompson (BAR)	10.11	Tim Harden (USA)	10.12
400 metres	Mark Richardson (GBR)	44.88	Jerome Young (USA)	44.96	Iwan Thomas (GBR)	44.96
1500 metres	Hicham El Guerrouj (MAR)	3:32.03	Laban Rotich (KEN)	3:33.04	William Tanui (KEN)	3:33.30
3000 metres	Haile Gebrselassie (ETH)	7:50.00	Luke Kipkosgei (KEN)	7:50.87	Julius Gitahi (KEN)	7:51.49
400 m hurdles	Stéphane Diagana (FRA)	48.30	Dinsdale Morgan (JAM)	48.60	Samuel Matete (ZAM)	48.73
High jump	Javier Sotomayor (CUB)	2.31 m	Staffan Strand (SWE)	2.28 m	Charles Austin (USA)	2.28 m
Pole vault	Maksim Tarasov (RUS)	5.95 m	Jean Galfione (FRA)	5.90 m	Danny Ecker (GER)	5.80 m
Triple jump	Charles Friedek (GER)	17.33 m	Denis Kapustin (RUS)	17.01 m	Aleksandr Glavatskiy (BLR)	16.98 m
Shot put	John Godina (USA)	21.21 m	Yuriy Bilonog (UKR)	20.62 m	Oliver-Sven Buder (GER)	20.53 m
Hammer throw	Tibor Gécsek (HUN)	81.21 m	Balázs Kiss (HUN)	79.71 m	Andrey Abduvaliyev (UZB)	78.30 m

=== Women ===
Event	Gold		Silver		Bronze	
Overall	Marion Jones (USA)	130	Svetlana Masterkova (RUS)	107	Falilat Ogunkoya (NGR)	101
100 metres	Marion Jones (USA)	10.83	Savatheda Fynes (BAH)	11.10	Inger Miller (USA)	11.15
400 metres	Falilat Ogunkoya (NGR)	49.73	Charity Opara (NGR)	50.09	Sandie Richards (JAM)	50.44
1500 metres	Svetlana Masterkova (RUS)	4:03.79	Kutre Dulecha (ETH)	4:04.72	Carla Sacramento (POR)	4:05.82
3000 metres	Gete Wami (ETH)	8:40.11	Zahra Ouaziz (MAR)	8:40.45	Mariya Pantyukhova (RUS)	8:47.77
100 m hurdles	Michelle Freeman (JAM)	12.56	Melissa Morrison (USA)	12.63	Glory Alozie (NGR)	12.72
Long jump	Marion Jones (USA)	7.13 m	Heike Drechsler (GER)	6.99 m	Fiona May (ITA)	6.89 m
Discus throw	Natalya Sadova (RUS)	68.50 m	Franka Dietzsch (GER)	65.24 m	Nicoleta Grasu (ROM)	65.10 m
Javelin throw	Tanja Damaske (GER)	68.40 m	Tatyana Shikolenko (RUS)	67.84 m	Trine Hattestad (NOR)	67.26 m
