= Patrick Ndururi =

Kenyan middle-distance runner

Medal record

Men's athletics

Representing Kenya

African Championships
Silver medal – second place	1998 Dakar	800 m

Patrick Ndururi Kinaga (21 January 1969 – 25 October 2009) was a Kenyan middle-distance runner who specialized in the 800 metres. On 13 August 1997 he ran a personal best of 1:42.62 minutes at the Weltklasse Zürich meeting. This time ranks him in the top twenty fastest people in history over this distance.

His greatest performance on the global stage came at the 1997 World Championships in Athletics, where he finished seventh in the final. He was the 400 metres bronze medallist at the 1995 Military World Games. He won three international 800 m medals in his career: silver at the 1997 IAAF Grand Prix Final, gold at the 1998 Goodwill Games, and silver at the 1998 African Championships in Athletics.

He was coached and mentored by five times world cross country champion John Ngugi at his camp Mt. Kenya High Altitude Training Camp, where athletes like Samuel Kamau Wanjiru the Olympic marathon champion were trained.

Ndururi was from the Gatunyu village, Mugomoini sub-location, Gatanga District. His parents were Naftali Kinaga and Joyce Njoki. Ndururi was married to Florence Wanjiru with one child. Ndururi died on 25 October 2009 due to a suspected heart attack, and was buried on 3 November in his home town Thika in Central Kenya.

== Achievements ==
Year	Competition	Venue	Position	Notes
1995	Military World Games	Rome, Italy	3rd	400 m
1997	World Championships	Athens, Greece	7th	800 m
1997	IAAF Grand Prix Final	Fukuoka, Japan	2nd	800 m
1998	Goodwill Games	Uniondale, United States	1st	800 m
1998	African Championships	Dakar, Senegal	2nd	800 m
