= Melissa Morrison-Howard =

American hurdler (born 1971)

Personal information
- Born: July 9, 1971 (age 55) Mooresville, North Carolina, U.S.
Medal record
Women's athletics
Representing United States
Olympic Games
Bronze medal – third place	2000 Sydney	100 m hurdles
Bronze medal – third place	2004 Athens	100 m hurdles
World Indoor Championships
Bronze medal – third place	2003 Birmingham	60 m hurdles
USA Outdoor Championships
Gold medal – first place	1997 Indianapolis	100 m hurdles
USA Indoor Championships
Gold medal – first place	1998 Atlanta	60 m hurdles
Gold medal – first place	2002 New York	60 m hurdles

Melissa Morrison-Howard, née Melissa Morrison (July 9, 1971) is an American hurdler best known for winning two Olympic bronze medals. She also won the bronze medal at the 2003 World Indoor Championships as well as one national indoor championships. From 1992 to 1993, the Southern Conference's indoor and outdoor championships voted her as The Most Valuable Performer. As of 2020, she is considered one of the top 6 US scorers of all time for the 100-meter hurdles.

She is a 1993 graduate of Appalachian State University in Boone, North Carolina. During her career at Appalachian State, Morrison was coached by John Weaver. She won 17 individual Southern Conference championships and was an NCAA All-American in both the 55 and 100-meter hurdles in 1993.

In 2009, she was inducted into the Southern Conference Hall of Fame. Appalachian State University also honored her and other female athletes with the Trailblazer Award in 2018.

Following her Olympic successes, she worked as a special education teacher.

== Personal bests ==
Date	Event	Venue	Time
March 17, 2001	100 m	Coral Gables, Florida	11.59
April 12, 2002	200 m	Knoxville, Tennessee	23.98
August 23, 2004	100 m hurdles	Athens, Greece	12.53

== Achievements ==
Year	Competition	Venue	Position	Event	Notes
1997	World Indoor Championships	Paris, France	5th	60 m hurdles	
1997	USA Outdoor Championships	Indianapolis, United States	1st	100 m hurdles	
1998	Grand Prix Final	Moscow, Russia	2nd	100 m hurdles	
1998	USA Indoor Championships		1st	60 m hurdles	
1999	World Indoor Championships	Maebashi, Japan	6th	60 m hurdles	
2000	Olympic Games	Sydney, Australia	3rd	100 m hurdles	
2000	Grand Prix Final	Doha, Qatar	4th	100 m hurdles	
2002	Grand Prix Final	Paris, France	7th	100 m hurdles	
2002	USA Indoor Championships		1st	60 m hurdles	
2003	World Indoor Championships	Birmingham, England	3rd	60 m hurdles	
2003	World Athletics Final	Monaco	6th	100 m hurdles	
2004	Olympic Games	Athens, Greece	3rd	100 m hurdles	
