= Kelly Blair LaBounty =

American track and field athlete

Personal information
- Born: November 24, 1970 (age 55) Prosser, Washington, United States
- Spouse: Matt LaBounty

Sport
- Country: United States
- Sport: Track and field athletics

Achievements and titles
- Olympic finals: 1996 Summer Olympics: Women's heptathlon - Sixth; 2000 Summer Olympics: Qualifier
- World finals: 1998 Goodwill Games: Heptathlon - Third
Medal record
Representing United States
Summer Universiade
Bronze medal – third place	1993 Buffalo	Heptathlon

Kelly Blair LaBounty (born November 24, 1970) is a retired American track and field Olympic athlete.

== Collegiate career ==
Kelly Blair LaBounty attended the University of Oregon playing two sports, basketball and track and field. After two seasons she decided her basketball career would have to come to an end to focus on track. At Oregon she won a national title in the heptathlon in 1993.

== Olympics ==
Blair LaBounty placed sixth in the women's heptathlon in the 1996 Olympic Games held in Atlanta, Georgia, and also qualified for the 2000 Summer Olympics, but missed the games due to injury. She defeated Jackie Joyner-Kersee in the Olympic trials of 1996. Blair LaBounty placed third in the 1998 Goodwill Games in the heptathlon.

== Personal bests ==
Event	Performance	Location	Date	Points
Heptathlon	6,465 points	Indianapolis	June 12, 1997	6,465 points
100 metres hurdles	13.46	New York City	July 21, 1998	1,091 points
High jump	1.81 m (5 ft 11 1/4 in)	New Orleans	June 19, 1998	1,033 points
Shot put	13.08 m (42 ft 10 3/4 in)	New York City	July 21, 1998	776 points
200 metres	24.17	New Orleans	June 19, 1998	1,020 points
Long jump	6.72 m (22 ft 1/2 in)	Indianapolis	June 15, 1997	1,156 points
Javelin throw	46.48 m (152 ft 5 3/4 in)	Austin	May 6, 2000	828 points
800 metres	2:13.66	Athens	August 4, 1997	931 points
Virtual Best Performance				6,835 points

== Post-competitive career ==
She now lives in Eugene, Oregon, with her two sons Jacob and Lucas and her husband, former National Football League defensive end Matt LaBounty. She was hired as an assistant coach at the University of Oregon in 2006, and served in that capacity until her position was eliminated in 2008.

She was named to the University of Oregon Athletic Hall of Fame in 2004, and the Oregon Sports Hall of Fame in 2011.
