= Bryan Bronson =

American hurdler (born 1972)

Personal information
- Nationality: United States
- Born: September 9, 1972 (age 54) Jasper, Texas, U.S.

Sport
- Sport: Track and field
- Event: Hurdling
- College team: Rice
Medal record
Men's athletics
Representing the United States
World Championships
Bronze medal – third place	1997 Athens	400 m hurdles
Pan American Junior Athletics Championships
Gold medal – first place	1991 Kingston	200 m
- Updated on 5 May 2012

John Bryan Bronson (born September 9, 1972) is an American 400-meter hurdler, who won the bronze medal at the 1997 World Championships in Athens. He also represented his country at the 1996 Summer Olympics. He won three consecutive titles at the USA Outdoor Track and Field Championships from 1996 to 1998.

His personal best time was 47.03 seconds, achieved in June 1998 in New Orleans. The time is currently sixth on the all-time list.

He began his career as a sprint specialist and was the gold medallist in the 200 metres and 4×100 metres relay at the 1991 Pan American Junior Athletics Championships. In his youth he was chosen as the Gatorade National Track and Field Athlete of the Year. He studied at Rice University and represented his college athletically in NCAA competition. He was the 1993 NCAA outdoor champion in the 400 m hurdles.

He narrowly missed on sharing the US$1,000,000 jackpot on the 1998 IAAF Golden League circuit as he won the first six meetings but came only sixth in the 1998 IAAF Grand Prix Final. At the end of the season he won at the Goodwill Games with a games record time of 47.15 seconds.

He received a two-year ban from the sport in 1999 after failing a drugs test for steroids. He returned to action in 2002 and 2004 but never again competed at a top level championship.

While at Jasper High School, he was Track and Field News "High School Athlete of the Year" in 1991.

Awards
Preceded by Chris Nelloms	Track & Field News High School Boys Athlete of the Year; 1991	Succeeded by Jeff Buckey
Achievements
Preceded by (United States) Derrick Adkins	Men's 400m Hurdles Best Year Performance; 1997 – 1998	Succeeded by (Italy) Fabrizio Mori
