= National records in high jump =

The following table is an overview of national records in the high jump.

== Outdoor ==
=== Men ===
Country	Mark	Athlete	Date	Place	Ref.
Cuba	2.45 m (8 ft 1/4 in)	Javier Sotomayor	27 July 1993	Salamanca	
Qatar	2.43 m (7 ft 11 1/2 in)	Mutaz Essa Barshim	5 September 2014	Brussels	
Sweden	2.42 m (7 ft 11 1/4 in)	Patrik Sjöberg	30 June 1987	Stockholm	
Ukraine	2.42 m (7 ft 11 1/4 in)	Bohdan Bondarenko	14 June 2014	New York City	
Kyrgyzstan	2.41 m (7 ft 10 3/4 in)	Igor Paklin	4 September 1985	Kobe	
Romania	2.40 m (7 ft 10 1/4 in)	Sorin Matei	20 June 1990	Bratislava	
United States	2.40 m (7 ft 10 1/4 in)	Charles Austin	7 August 1991	Zürich	
Russia	2.40 m (7 ft 10 1/4 in)	Vyacheslav Voronin	5 August 2000	London	
Canada	2.40 m (7 ft 10 1/4 in)	Derek Drouin	25 April 2014	Des Moines	
China	2.39 m (7 ft 10 in)	Zhu Jianhua	11 June 1983	Beijing	
Italy	2.39 m (7 ft 10 in)	Gianmarco Tamberi	15 July 2016	Monaco	
Serbia	2.38 m (7 ft 9 1/2 in)	Dragutin Topić	1 August 1993	Belgrade	
Bahamas	2.38 m (7 ft 9 1/2 in)	Troy Kemp	12 July 1995	Nice	
Poland	2.38 m (7 ft 9 1/2 in)	Artur Partyka	18 August 1996	Eberstadt	
South Africa	2.38 m (7 ft 9 1/2 in)	Jacques Freitag	5 March 2005	Oudtshoorn	
Azerbaijan	2.37 m (7 ft 9 1/4 in)	Valeriy Sereda	2 September 1984	Rieti	
Belarus	2.37 m (7 ft 9 1/4 in)	Maksim Nedasekau	6 July 2021	Székesfehérvár	
Belarus	2.37 m (7 ft 9 1/4 in)	Maksim Nedasekau	1 August 2021	Tokyo	
Kazakhstan	2.36 m (7 ft 8 3/4 in)	Sergey Zasimovich	5 May 1984	Tashkent	
Belgium	2.36 m (7 ft 8 3/4 in)	Eddy Annys	26 May 1985	Ghent	
Slovakia	2.36 m (7 ft 8 3/4 in)	Jan Zvara	23 August 1987	Prague	
Bermuda	2.36 m (7 ft 8 3/4 in)	Clarence Saunders	1 February 1990	Auckland	
Bulgaria	2.36 m (7 ft 8 3/4 in)	Georgi Dakov	10 August 1990	Brussels	
Greece	2.36 m (7 ft 8 3/4 in)	Lambros Papakostas	21 July 1992	Athens	
Norway	2.36 m (7 ft 8 3/4 in)	Steinar Hoen	1 July 1997	Oslo	
Australia	2.36 m (7 ft 8 3/4 in)	Tim Forsyth	2 March 1997	Melbourne	
Australia	2.36 m (7 ft 8 3/4 in)	Brandon Starc	26 August 2018	Eberstadt	
Israel	2.36 m (7 ft 8 3/4 in)	Konstantin Matusevich	5 February 2000	Perth	
Syria	2.36 m (7 ft 8 3/4 in)	Majd Eddin Ghazal	18 May 2016	Beijing	
New Zealand	2.36 m (7 ft 8 3/4 in)	Hamish Kerr	10 August 2024	Paris	
Cyprus	2.35 m (7 ft 8 1/2 in)	Kyriakos Ioannou	29 August 2007	Osaka	
South Korea	2.35 m (7 ft 8 1/2 in)	Woo Sang-hyeok	1 August 2021	Tokyo	
South Korea	2.35 m (7 ft 8 1/2 in)	Woo Sang-hyeok	18 July 2022	Eugene	
South Korea	2.35 m (7 ft 8 1/2 in)	Woo Sang-hyeok	16 September 2023	Eugene	
Lithuania	2.34 m (7 ft 8 in)	Rolandas Verkys	16 June 1991	Warsaw	
Spain	2.34 m (7 ft 8 in)	Arturo Ortiz	22 June 1991	Barcelona	
Algeria	2.34 m (7 ft 8 in)	Abderrahmane Hammad	14 July 2000	Algiers	
Jamaica	2.34 m (7 ft 8 in)	Germaine Mason	9 August 2003	Santo Domingo	
Botswana	2.34 m (7 ft 8 in)	Kabelo Kgosiemang	4 May 2008	Addis Ababa	
Colombia	2.33 m (7 ft 7 1/2 in) A	Gilmar Mayo	17 October 1994	Pereira	
Japan	2.23 m (7 ft 3 3/4 in)	Naoyuki Daigo	2 July 2006	Kobe	
Switzerland	2.33 m (7 ft 7 1/2 in)	Loïc Gasch	8 May 2021	Lausanne	
Uzbekistan	2.32 m (7 ft 7 1/4 in)	Gennadiy Belkov	29 May 1982	Tashkent	
Brazil	2.32 m (7 ft 7 1/4 in)	Jessé de Lima	2 September 2008	Lausanne	
Slovenia	2.32 m (7 ft 7 1/4 in)	Rožle Prezelj	17 June 2012	Maribor	
Tajikistan	2.31 m (7 ft 6 3/4 in)	Oleg Palaschevskiy	12 August 1990	Bryansk	
Bosnia and Herzegovina	2.31 m (7 ft 6 3/4 in)	Elvir Krehmic	7 July 1998	Zagreb	
Saint Lucia	2.31 m (7 ft 6 3/4 in)	Darvin Edwards	30 August 2011	Daegu	
Peru	2.31 m (7 ft 6 3/4 in) A	Arturo Chávez	11 June 2016	Mexico City	
Venezuela	2.31 m (7 ft 6 3/4 in)	Eure Yáñez	23 June 2017	Luque	
Mexico	2.31 m (7 ft 6 3/4 in)	Edgar Rivera	2 June 2021	Šamorín	
India	2.31 m (7 ft 6 3/4 in)	Sarvesh Kushare	27 June 2026	Bhubaneswar	
Latvia	2.30 m (7 ft 6 1/2 in)	Normunds Sietiņš	20 July 1992	Nurmijärvi	
Estonia	2.30 m (7 ft 6 1/2 in)	Marko Turban	5 June 1996	Rakvere	
Netherlands	2.30 m (7 ft 6 1/2 in)	Wilbert Pennings	7 August 1999	Eberstadt	
Ireland	2.30 m (7 ft 6 1/2 in)	Adrian O'Dwyer	24 June 2004	Algiers	
Ecuador	2.30 m (7 ft 6 1/2 in)	Diego Ferrín	27 October 2011	Guadalajara	
Malaysia	2.30 m (7 ft 6 1/2 in)	Nauraj Singh Randhawa	27 April 2017	Singapore	
Turkey	2.30 m (7 ft 6 1/2 in)	Alperen Acet	3 June 2018	Cluj-Napoca	
Kenya	2.30 m (7 ft 6 1/2 in) A	Mathieu Sawe	6 June 2018	Nairobi	
Kenya	2.30 m (7 ft 6 1/2 in)	Mathieu Sawe	3 August 2018	Asaba	
Sri Lanka	2.30 m (7 ft 6 1/2 in)	Ushan Thiwanka	8 May 2021	Canyon	
Chinese Taipei	2.29 m (7 ft 6 in)	Hsiang Chun-hsien	21 October 2015	Kaohsiung	
Puerto Rico	2.29 m (7 ft 6 in)	David Adley Smith II	23 April 2016	Auburn	
Puerto Rico	2.29 m (7 ft 6 in)	Luis Castro	28 May 2016	Sinn	
Croatia	2.28 m (7 ft 5 3/4 in)	Novica Čanović	6 July 1985	Split	
Austria	2.28 m (7 ft 5 3/4 in)	Markus Einberger	18 May 1986	Schwechat	
Mauritius	2.28 m (7 ft 5 3/4 in)	Khemraj Naiko	27 May 1996	Dakar	
Hungary	2.28 m (7 ft 5 3/4 in)	László Boros	6 July 2005	Debrecen	
Sudan	2.28 m (7 ft 5 3/4 in)	Mohamed Younis Idris	27 May 2015	Namur	
Cameroon	2.28 m (7 ft 5 3/4 in)	Fernand Djoumessi	19 June 2014	Bühl	
Saint Kitts and Nevis	2.28 m (7 ft 5 3/4 in)	Jermaine Francis	1 August 2018	Barranquilla	
Denmark	2.28 m (7 ft 5 3/4 in)	Janick Klausen	20 June 2019	Essen	
Lebanon	2.27 m (7 ft 5 1/4 in)	Jean-Claude Rabbath	23 April 2004	Beirut	
Lebanon	2.27 m (7 ft 5 1/4 in)	Jean-Claude Rabbath	12 June 2004	Bucharest	
Antigua and Barbuda	2.27 m (7 ft 5 1/4 in)	James Grayman	7 July 2007	Pergine Valsugana	
San Marino	2.27 m (7 ft 5 1/4 in)	Eugenio Rossi	28 June 2015	Caprino Veronese	
Thailand	2.27 m (7 ft 5 1/4 in)	Tawan Kaeodam	12 May 2023	Phnom Penh	
Senegal	2.26 m (7 ft 4 3/4 in)	Moussa Sagna Fall	9 July 1982	Paris	
Iran	2.26 m (7 ft 4 3/4 in)	Keivan Ghanbarzadeh	20 April 2012	Shiraz	
Iran	2.26 m (7 ft 4 3/4 in)	Keivan Ghanbarzadeh	22 June 2015	Bangkok	
Iran	2.26 m (7 ft 4 3/4 in)	Keivan Ghanbarzadeh	25 June 2015	Pathum Thani	
Georgia	2.26 m (7 ft 4 3/4 in)	Zurab Gogochuri	16 June 2012	Tbilisi	
Argentina	2.25 m (7 ft 4 1/2 in) A	Fernando Pastoriza	23 July 1988	Mexico City	
Argentina	2.25 m (7 ft 4 1/2 in)	Erasmo Jara	11 May 2002	Rosario	
Argentina	2.25 m (7 ft 4 1/2 in) A	Carlos Layoy	6 June 2018	Cochabamba	
Vietnam	2.25 m (7 ft 4 1/2 in)	Nguyễn Duy Bằng	28 September 2004	Singapore	
Barbados	2.25 m (7 ft 4 1/2 in)	Henderson Dottin	12 April 2008	El Paso	
Republic of Moldova	2.25 m (7 ft 4 1/2 in)	Radu Tucan	30 May 2008	Chişinău	
Republic of Moldova	2.25 m (7 ft 4 1/2 in)	Andrei Mîţîcov	28 May 2016	Tiraspol	
Egypt	2.25 m (7 ft 4 1/2 in)	Karim Samir Lotfy	27 June 2008	Eberstadt	
Dominica	2.25 m (7 ft 4 1/2 in)	Brendan Williams	17 March 2012	Havana	
Mali	2.25 m (7 ft 4 1/2 in)	Abdoulaye Diarra	24 May 2015	Tourcoing	
Singapore	2.25 m (7 ft 4 1/2 in)	Kampton Kam	11 April 2025	Tampa	
Dominican Republic	2.24 m (7 ft 4 in)	Julio Luciano	8 June 1996	Santo Domingo	
Ghana	2.24 m (7 ft 4 in)	Kwaku Boateng	8 August 1996	Kitchener	
Philippines	2.23 m (7 ft 3 3/4 in)	Leonard Grospe	12 June 2026	New Clark City	
Jordan	2.22 m (7 ft 3 1/4 in)	Fakhredin Fouad	4 July 1991	Amman	
Luxembourg	2.22 m (7 ft 3 1/4 in)	Raymond Conzemius	3 September 1995	Dudelange	
Chile	2.22 m (7 ft 3 1/4 in) A	Felipe Apablaza	3 June 2001	Cochabamba	
Haiti	2.22 m (7 ft 3 1/4 in)	Huguens Jean	14 June 2003	Sacramento	
Burkina Faso	2.22 m (7 ft 3 1/4 in)	Boubacar Séré	13 August 2006	Bambous	
Burkina Faso	2.22 m (7 ft 3 1/4 in)	Boubacar Séré	27 June 2007	Celle Ligure	
Grenada	2.21 m (7 ft 3 in)	Paul Caraballo	26 April 1997	Des Moines	
Saudi Arabia	2.21 m (7 ft 3 in)	Jamal Fakhri Al-Qasim	8 July 2006	Lublin	
Saudi Arabia	2.21 m (7 ft 3 in)	Hashim Issa Al-Oqabi	25 July 2007	Amman	
Saudi Arabia	2.21 m (7 ft 3 in)	Nawaf Ahmad Al-Yami	15 June 2013	Salzburg	
Panama	2.21 m (7 ft 3 in)	Alexander Bowen Jr.	9 May 2015	Albany	
Turkmenistan	2.20 m (7 ft 2 1/2 in)	Nikolay Stolyarov	19 May 1996	Almaty	
Seychelles	2.20 m (7 ft 2 1/2 in)	Eugéne Ernesta	14 July 2000	Algiers	
Seychelles	2.20 m (7 ft 2 1/2 in)	William Woodcock	13 June 2010	Victoria	
Seychelles	2.20 m (7 ft 2 1/2 in)	William Woodcock	9 October 2010	New Delhi	
Kuwait	2.20 m (7 ft 2 1/2 in)	Salem Al-Anezi	15 May 2004	Kuwait City	
Kuwait	2.20 m (7 ft 2 1/2 in)	Salem Al-Anezi	24 November 2007	Cairo	
Turks and Caicos Islands	2.20 m (7 ft 2 1/2 in)	Domanique Missick	19 August 2012	Providenciales	
Zambia	2.20 m (7 ft 2 1/2 in)	Bwalya Humphrey	4 March 2018	Ndola	
Iraq	2.20 m (7 ft 2 1/2 in)	Hussein Al-Ibraheemi	19 September 2019	Sulaymaniyah	
Bahrain	2.19 m (7 ft 2 in)	Salem Nasser Bakheet	10 October 2002	Busan	
Bahrain	2.19 m (7 ft 2 in)	Salem Nasser Bakheet	9 December 2006	Doha	
Namibia	2.18 m (7 ft 1 3/4 in)	Max Schäfer	16 April 1988	Bloemfontein	
United Arab Emirates	2.16 m (7 ft 1 in)	Abdullah Mohammad Abbas Derouiche	8 December 2005	Doha	
United Arab Emirates	2.16 m (7 ft 1 in)	Sayed Abbas Al-Alaoui	29 June 2012	Iława	
United Arab Emirates	2.16 m (7 ft 1 in)	Sayed Abbas Al-Alaoui	10 April 2013	Doha	
Bangladesh	2.16 m (7 ft 1 in)	Mahfuzur Rahman	3 December 2019	Kathmandu	
Tunisia	2.15 m (7 ft 1/2 in)	Belhassen Chikhaoui	12 July 1995	Aubervilliers	
Uruguay	2.14 m (7 ft 1/4 in)	Elbio Pelloni	24 April 1988	Americana	
Pakistan	2.14 m (7 ft 1/4 in)	Shehroz Khan	12 August 2022	Konya	
British Virgin Islands	2.13 m (6 ft 11 3/4 in)	Karl Scatliffe	1 July 1990	Road Town	
British Virgin Islands	2.13 m (6 ft 11 3/4 in)	Raymond Solomon	14 July 1991	Coamo	
Uganda	2.12 m (6 ft 11 1/4 in) A	David Okot	16 July 2011	Nairobi	
Aruba	2.12 m (6 ft 11 1/4 in)	Wuill Vrolijk	9 May 2026	Lisse	
Ethiopia	2.12 m (6 ft 11 1/4 in) A	Gemeda Abata	24 March 2026	Addis Ababa	
Samoa	2.09 m (6 ft 10 1/4 in)	Nathan Sua'mene	28 February 1999	Hamilton	
Angola	2.10 m (6 ft 10 1/2 in)	Orlando Bonifácio	9 May 1982	Luanda	
Bolivia	2.10 m (6 ft 10 1/2 in) A	Claudio Pinto	12 November 1988	La Paz	
Liechtenstein	2.08 m (6 ft 9 3/4 in)	Christian Gloor	17 June 2001	Meilen	
Liechtenstein	2.08 m (6 ft 9 3/4 in)	Joel Riesen	31 May 2025	Andorra la Vella	
Macau	2.08 m (6 ft 9 3/4 in)	Wong Chi Wai	19 May 2016	Taoyuan	
Tonga	2.06 m (6 ft 9 in)	Mosese Foliaki	16 July 2019	Apia	
Cambodia	2.03 m (6 ft 7 3/4 in)	Sin Sitha	5 August 1972	Aachen	
US Virgin Islands	2.03 m (6 ft 7 3/4 in)	Patrick Moore	24 June 1984	San Juan	
Belize	2.03 m (6 ft 7 3/4 in)	Joel Wade	17 August 1997	Belize City	
Montserrat	2.03 m (6 ft 7 3/4 in)	Gavin Lee	17 April 2002		
Rwanda	2.01 m (6 ft 7 in)	Ian Kagame	20 April 2019	Williamstown	
Mozambique	2.00 m (6 ft 6 1/2 in) A	Chambárson Chambal	19 February 2011	Potchefstroom	
Mozambique	2.00 m (6 ft 6 1/2 in)	Chambárson Chambal	15 September 2011	Maputo	
Maldives	1.91 m (6 ft 3 in)	Yusuf Naik Vajeeh	19 June 2026	Malé	
Solomon Islands	1.90 m (6 ft 2 3/4 in)	Toswell Tahisu	1972	Honiara	
Afghanistan	1.90 m (6 ft 2 3/4 in)	Abdoul Skour	1973	Kabul	
Malta	1.90 m (6 ft 2 3/4 in)	Cassar Tomeggiani	24 June 2017	Marsa	
Bhutan	1.88 m (6 ft 2 in)	Mipham Yoezer Gurung	20 July 2019	Thimphu	
Gibraltar	1.82 m (5 ft 11 1/2 in)	Antonio Segovia	16 July 1983	Gibraltar	

=== Women ===
Country	Mark	Athlete	Date	Place	Ref.
Ukraine	2.10 m (6 ft 10 1/2 in)	Yaroslava Mahuchikh	7 July 2024	Paris	
Bulgaria	2.09 m (6 ft 10 1/4 in)	Stefka Kostadinova	30 August 1987	Rome	
Croatia	2.08 m (6 ft 9 3/4 in)	Blanka Vlašić	31 August 2009	Zagreb	
Russia	2.07 m (6 ft 9 1/4 in)	Anna Chicherova	22 July 2011	Cheboksary	
Sweden	2.06 m (6 ft 9 in)	Kajsa Bergqvist	26 July 2003	Eberstadt	
South Africa	2.06 m (6 ft 9 in)	Hestrie Cloete	31 August 2003	Saint-Denis	
Belgium	2.05 m (6 ft 8 1/2 in)	Tia Hellebaut	23 August 2008	Beijing	
United States	2.05 m (6 ft 8 1/2 in)	Chaunté Lowe	26 June 2010	Des Moines	
Cuba	2.04 m (6 ft 8 1/4 in)	Silvia Costa	9 September 1989	Barcelona	
Australia	2.04 m (6 ft 8 1/4 in)	Nicola Olyslagers	27 August 2025	Zurich	
Greece	2.03 m (6 ft 7 3/4 in)	Niki Bakogianni	3 August 1996	Atlanta	
Spain	2.02 m (6 ft 7 1/2 in)	Ruth Beitia	4 August 2007	San Sebastián	
Romania	2.02 m (6 ft 7 1/2 in)	Monica Iagăr	6 June 1998	Budapest	
Romania	2.02 m (6 ft 7 1/2 in)	Monica Iagăr	17 June 2000	Villeneuve-d'Ascq	
Kazakhstan	2.01 m (6 ft 7 in)	Olga Turchak	7 July 1986	Moscow	
Norway	2.01 m (6 ft 7 in)	Hanne Haugland	13 August 1997	Zurich	
Belarus	2.00 m (6 ft 6 1/2 in)	Tatyana Shevchik	14 May 1993	Gomel	
Belarus	2.00 m (6 ft 6 1/2 in)	Karyna Taranda	5 July 2019	Lausanne	
Slovenia	2.00 m (6 ft 6 1/2 in)	Britta Bilač	14 August 1994	Helsinki	
Czech Republic	2.00 m (6 ft 6 1/2 in)	Zuzana Hlavoňová	5 June 2000	Prague	
Hungary	2.00 m (6 ft 6 1/2 in)	Dóra Győrffy	26 July 2001	Nyíregyháza	
Great Britain	2.00 m (6 ft 6 1/2 in)	Morgan Lake	27 August 2025	Zurich	
Uzbekistan	1.98 m (6 ft 5 3/4 in)	Lyudmila Butuzova	10 June 1984	Sochi	
Canada	1.98 m (6 ft 5 3/4 in)	Debbie Brill	2 September 1984	Rieti	
Saint Lucia	1.98 m (6 ft 5 3/4 in)	Levern Spencer	8 May 2010	Athens	
Serbia	1.98 m (6 ft 5 3/4 in)	Angelina Topić	19 May 2024	Rabat	
Serbia	1.98 m (6 ft 5 3/4 in)	Angelina Topić	7 July 2024	Paris	
China	1.97 m (6 ft 5 1/2 in)	Jin Ling	7 May 1989	Hamamatsu	
Latvia	1.97 m (6 ft 5 1/2 in)	Valentīna Gotovska	30 March 1992	Vilnius	
Austria	1.97 m (6 ft 5 1/2 in)	Sigrid Kirchmann	21 August 1993	Stuttgart	
Republic of Moldova	1.97 m (6 ft 5 1/2 in)	Olga Bolşova	5 September 1993	Rieti	
Argentina	1.97 m (6 ft 5 1/2 in)	Solange Witteveen	19 May 2001	Manaus	
Dominican Republic	1.97 m (6 ft 5 1/2 in)	Juana Rosario Arrendel	2 December 2002	San Salvador	
Kyrgyzstan	1.97 m (6 ft 5 1/2 in)	Tatyana Efimenko	11 July 2003	Rome	
Mexico	1.97 m (6 ft 5 1/2 in)	Romary Rifka	4 April 2004	Xalapa	
Switzerland	1.97 m (6 ft 5 1/2 in)	Salome Lang	27 June 2021	Langenthal	
Montenegro	1.97 m (6 ft 5 1/2 in)	Marija Vuković	27 June 2021	Smederevo	
Jamaica	1.97 m (6 ft 5 1/2 in)	Lamara Distin	30 April 2022	College Station	
Finland	1.97 m (6 ft 5 1/2 in)	Ella Junnila	18 June 2024	Turku	
Ghana	1.97 m (6 ft 5 1/2 in)	Rose Yeboah	8 June 2024	Eugene	
Turkmenistan	1.96 m (6 ft 5 in)	Galina Brigadnaya	13 September 1985	Alma Ata	
Argentina	1.96 m (6 ft 5 in)	Solange Witteveen	8 September 1997	Oristano	
Japan	1.96 m (6 ft 5 in)	Miki Imai	15 September 2001	Yokohama	
Estonia	1.96 m (6 ft 5 in)	Anna Iljuštšenko	9 August 2011	Viljandi	
Estonia	1.96 m (6 ft 5 in)	Karmen Bruus	19 July 2022	Eugene	
Côte d'Ivoire	1.95 m (6 ft 4 3/4 in)	Lucienne N'Da	28 June 1992	Belle Vue Maurel	
Nigeria	1.95 m (6 ft 4 3/4 in)	Doreen Amata	3 July 2008	Abuja	
Nigeria	1.95 m (6 ft 4 3/4 in)	Doreen Amata	16 July 2011	Eberstadt	
Nigeria	1.95 m (6 ft 4 3/4 in)	Doreen Amata	1 September 2011	Daegu	
Ireland	1.95 m (6 ft 4 3/4 in)	Deirdre Ryan	1 September 2011	Daegu	
Trinidad and Tobago	1.95 m (6 ft 4 3/4 in)	Tyra Gittens	13 May 2021	College Station	
Trinidad and Tobago	1.95 m (6 ft 4 3/4 in)	Tyra Gittens	2 April 2022	College Station	
Netherlands	1.95 m (6 ft 4 3/4 in)	Britt Weerman	19 July 2022	Ninove	
Bosnia and Herzegovina	1.94 m (6 ft 4 1/4 in)	Amra Temim	15 August 1987	Varaždin	
Denmark	1.94 m (6 ft 4 1/4 in)	Pia Zinck	8 August 1997	Athens	
Burkina Faso	1.94 m (6 ft 4 1/4 in)	Irène Tiéndrebeogo	1 August 1999	Niort	
Vietnam	1.94 m (6 ft 4 1/4 in)	Bui Thi Nhung	4 May 2005	Bangkok	
Thailand	1.94 m (6 ft 4 1/4 in)	Noengrothai Chaipetch	14 December 2009	Vientiane	
Turkey	1.94 m (6 ft 4 1/4 in)	Burcu Ayhan	16 July 2011	Ostrava	
Colombia	1.94 m (6 ft 4 1/4 in) A	María Fernanda Murillo	1 May 2019	Medellín	
South Korea	1.93 m (6 ft 3 3/4 in)	Kim Hui-seon	10 June 1990	Seoul	
Cyprus	1.93 m (6 ft 3 3/4 in)	Leontia Kallenou	15 May 2015	Starkville	
India	1.93 m (6 ft 3 3/4 in)	Pooja Singh	29 May 2026	Hong Kong	
Guinea	1.93 m (6 ft 3 3/4 in)	Fatoumata Balley	24 June 2026	Zagreb	
Brazil	1.92 m (6 ft 3 1/2 in)	Orlane dos Santos	11 August 1989	Bogotá	
Albania	1.92 m (6 ft 3 1/2 in)	Klodeta Gjini	22 August 1989	Tirana	
New Zealand	1.92 m (6 ft 3 1/2 in)	Tania Dixon	26 January 1991	Dunedin	
Israel	1.92 m (6 ft 3 1/2 in)	Danielle Frenkel	30 July 2010	Barcelona	
Israel	1.92 m (6 ft 3 1/2 in)	Ma'ayan Fureman-Shahaf	9 August 2011	Neurim	
Israel	1.92 m (6 ft 3 1/2 in)	Ma'ayan Fureman-Shahaf	17 July 2013	Tel Aviv	
Seychelles	1.92 m (6 ft 3 1/2 in) A	Lissa Labiche	9 May 2015	Potchefstroom	
Georgia	1.92 m (6 ft 3 1/2 in)	Valentyna Liashenko	27 June 2015	Berdychiv	
Tajikistan	1.91 m (6 ft 3 in)	Yelena Gorobets	11 July 1981	Leningrad	
Antigua and Barbuda	1.91 m (6 ft 3 in)	Priscilla Frederick	22 July 2015	Toronto	
Guyana	1.90 m (6 ft 2 3/4 in)	Najuma Fletcher	3 June 1995	Knoxville	
Guyana	1.90 m (6 ft 2 3/4 in)	Najuma Fletcher	11 August 1995	Gothenburg	
Venezuela	1.90 m (6 ft 2 3/4 in)	Marierlis Rojas	29 March 2008	Ponce	
Chinese Taipei	1.90 m (6 ft 2 3/4 in)	Li Ching-Ching	18 October 2021	New Taipei City	
Bermuda	1.89 m (6 ft 2 1/4 in)	Sakari Famous	7 August 2026	Santo Domingo	
Portugal	1.88 m (6 ft 2 in)	Sónia Carvalho	3 June 2001	Vila Real de Santo António	
Hong Kong	1.88 m (6 ft 2 in)	Yeung Man Wai	30 April 2017	Taipei City	
Grenada	1.86 m (6 ft 1 in)	Patricia Sylvester	11 June 2013	Toronto	
Singapore	1.86 m (6 ft 1 in)	Michelle Sng	30 October 2021	Singapore	
Sri Lanka	1.85 m (6 ft 3/4 in)	Priyangika Madumanthi	8 March 2008	Kochi	
Luxembourg	1.85 m (6 ft 3/4 in)	Elodie Tshilumba	9 June 2017	Pierre-Benite	
Uruguay	1.83 m (6 ft 0 in)	Lorena Aires	10 March 2018	Montevideo	
Samoa	1.82 m (5 ft 11 1/2 in)	Angela Pule	31 August 1982	Brisbane	
Namibia	1.82 m (5 ft 11 1/2 in) A	Orla Venter	30 April 1993	Gaborone	
Bahamas	1.81 m (5 ft 11 1/4 in)	Kenya Nafeia Culmer	12 May 2012	Wichita	
U.S. Virgin Islands	1.81 m (5 ft 11 1/4 in)	Yashira Rhymer-Stuart	6 April 2019	Bowling Green	
Ethiopia	1.81 m (5 ft 11 1/4 in)	Ariyat Dibow Ubang	27 August 2019	Rabat	
Kuwait	1.80 m (5 ft 10 3/4 in)	Yasmeen Roy	10 November 2026	Dakar	
Tunisia	1.78 m (5 ft 10 in)	Kawther Akrémi	16 July 1983	Casablanca	
Tunisia	1.78 m (5 ft 10 in)	Karima Benothman	8 July 2007	Radès	
Costa Rica	1.78 m (5 ft 10 in)	Abigail Obando	6 May 2023	San José	
Kenya	1.75 m (5 ft 8 3/4 in) A	Caroline Cherotich	13 May 2014	Nairobi	
Bolivia	1.74 m (5 ft 8 1/2 in) A	Carla Rios	29 May 2022	Cochabamba	
Belize	1.73 m (5 ft 8 in)	Katy Sealy (Note: Katy Sealy transferred from Great Britain to Belize on 9 June 2010)	13 July 2018	Guatemala City	
Uganda	1.71 m (5 ft 7 1/4 in) A	Victoria Atim	8 December 1973	Kampala	
Bangladesh	1.71 m (5 ft 7 1/4 in)	Umme Hafsa Rumki	3 January 2022	Dhaka	
Oman	1.71 m (5 ft 7 1/4 in)	Aliya Al-Mughairi	1 May 2025	Oran	
Bahrain	1.70 m (5 ft 6 3/4 in)	Mariam Mohamed Al-Ansari	17 December 2011	Doha	
Bahrain	1.70 m (5 ft 6 3/4 in)	Mariam Mohamed Al-Ansari	9 March 2013	Manama	
Bahrain	1.70 m (5 ft 6 3/4 in)	Mariam Mohamed Al-Ansari	15 March 2015	Muscat	
Pakistan	1.69 m (5 ft 6 1/2 in) A	Rehana Kausar	27 September 1999	Kathmandu	
Turks and Caicos Islands	1.68 m (5 ft 6 in)	Tanesia Gardiner	8 May 2021	Providenciales	
British Virgin Islands	1.65 m (5 ft 4 3/4 in)	Takola Creque	21 May 1994	Road Town	
British Virgin Islands	1.65 m (5 ft 4 3/4 in)	Chantel Malone	29 June 2008	Road Town	
British Virgin Islands	1.65 m (5 ft 4 3/4 in)	Z’Niah Hutchinson	7 March 2016	Tortola	
British Virgin Islands	1.65 m (5 ft 4 3/4 in)	Xiomara Malone	1 April 2022	Orem	
British Virgin Islands	1.65 m (5 ft 4 3/4 in)	Xiomara Malone	9 April 2022	Logan	
Angola	1.65 m (5 ft 4 3/4 in)	Xenia Fortes	25 April 1996	Viseu	
Macau	1.65 m (5 ft 4 3/4 in) (Note: ratified by AAMC; not recognized by World Athletics)	Wong Wang-lok	6 March 2021	Macau	
Macau	1.65 m (5 ft 4 3/4 in)	Wong Wang-lok	7 June 2023	Yecheon	
Malta	1.61 m (5 ft 3 1/4 in)	Chloe Gambin	19 February 2011	Marsa	
Malta	1.61 m (5 ft 3 1/4 in)	Rachela Pace	5 May 2017	Marsa	
United Arab Emirates	1.59 m (5 ft 2 1/2 in)	Alia Youssef Al-Hammadi	15 March 2015	Muscat	
Montserrat	1.57 m (5 ft 1 3/4 in)	Lynette Lee	23 May 1971	London	
Cambodia	1.53 m (5 ft 0 in)	Our Kim Leang	19 July 1968	Phnom Penh	
Qatar	1.52 m (4 ft 11 3/4 in)	Lial Tamam	17 May 2022	Kuwait City	
Saudi Arabia	1.50 m (4 ft 11 in)	Khadijah Aamer	2 May 2026	Al-Baha	
Solomon Islands	1.45 m (4 ft 9 in)	Roselyn Mason	1973	Honiara	
Solomon Islands	1.45 m (4 ft 9 in)	Agnetha V	25 April 1995	Honiara	
Gibraltar	1.42 m (4 ft 7 3/4 in)	Caroline Tante	20 July 1991	Gibraltar	
Afghanistan	1.11 m (3 ft 7 1/2 in)	Asma Mohammadi	22 September 2016	Rjukan	

== Indoor ==
=== Men ===
Country	Mark	Athlete	Date	Place	Ref.
Germany	2.42 m (7 ft 11 1/4 in)	Carlo Thränhardt	26 February 1988	Berlin	
Sweden	2.41 m (7 ft 10 3/4 in)	Patrik Sjöberg	1 February 1987	Piraeus	
Qatar	2.41 m (7 ft 10 3/4 in)	Mutaz Essa Barshim	18 February 2015	Athlone	
United States	2.40 m (7 ft 10 1/4 in)	Hollis Conway	10 March 1991	Seville	
Russia	2.40 m (7 ft 10 1/4 in)	Ivan Ukhov	25 February 2009	Piraeus	
Russia	2.40 m (7 ft 10 1/4 in)	Aleksey Dmitrik	8 February 2014	Arnstadt	
Great Britain	2.38 m (7 ft 9 1/2 in)	Steve Smith	4 February 1994	Wuppertal	
Romania	2.38 m (7 ft 9 1/2 in)	Sorin Matei	3 February 1995	Wuppertal	
Czech Republic	2.37 m (7 ft 9 1/4 in)	Jaroslav Bába	5 February 2005	Arnstadt	
Belarus	2.37 m (7 ft 9 1/4 in)	Maksim Nedasekau	7 March 2021	Toruń	
Norway	2.36 m (7 ft 8 3/4 in)	Steinar Hoen	12 February 1994	Balingen	
Norway	2.36 m (7 ft 8 3/4 in)	Steinar Hoen	3 March 1995	Berlin	
Bahamas	2.36 m (7 ft 8 3/4 in)	Troy Kemp	18 March 1994	Weinheim	
South Korea	2.36 m (7 ft 8 3/4 in)	Woo Sang-hyeok	5 February 2022	Hustopeče	
New Zealand	2.36 m (7 ft 8 3/4 in)	Hamish Kerr	3 March 2024	Glasgow	
France	2.35 m (7 ft 8 1/2 in)	Jean-Charles Gicquel	13 March 1994	Paris	
Japan	2.35 m (7 ft 8 1/2 in)	Naoto Tobe	2 February 2019	Karlsruhe	
Finland	2.33 m (7 ft 7 1/2 in)	Osku Torro	5 February 2011	Tampere	
Nigeria	2.32 m (7 ft 7 1/4 in)	Anthony Idiata	15 February 2000	Patras	
Cyprus	2.32 m (7 ft 7 1/4 in)	Kyriacos Ioannou	7 February 2008	Novi Sad	
Cyprus	2.32 m (7 ft 7 1/4 in)	Kyriacos Ioannou	13 February 2016	Hustopeče	
Cyprus	2.32 m (7 ft 7 1/4 in)	Dimitrios Chondrokoukis	14 February 2015	Piraeus	
Israel	2.31 m (7 ft 6 3/4 in)	Konstantin Matusevich	10 March 1996	Stockholm	
Netherlands	2.31 m (7 ft 6 3/4 in)	Wilbert Pennings	9 February 2002	Siegen	
Netherlands	2.31 m (7 ft 6 3/4 in)	Douwe Amels	5 March 2023	Istanbul	
Mexico	2.30 m (7 ft 6 1/2 in)	Edgar Rivera	9 February 2016	Brno	
Mexico	2.30 m (7 ft 6 1/2 in)	Edgar Rivera	4 February 2017	Hustopeče	
Mexico	2.30 m (7 ft 6 1/2 in)	Erick Portillo	21 March 2026	Toruń	
Bosnia and Herzegovina	2.29 m (7 ft 6 in)	Elvir Krehmić	13 February 1999	Piraeus	
Croatia	2.28 m (7 ft 5 3/4 in)	Novica Čanović	25 February 1986	Solna	
Iceland	2.28 m (7 ft 5 3/4 in)	Einar Karl Hjartarson	20 February 2001	Reykjavík	
Sudan	2.28 m (7 ft 5 3/4 in)	Mohamed Younes Idris	23 February 2014	Bordeaux	
Portugal	2.28 m (7 ft 5 3/4 in)	Paulo Conceição	1 February 2020	Kirchberg	
Estonia	2.27 m (7 ft 5 1/4 in)	Marko Aleksejev	15 February 2004	Tallinn	
Kenya	2.27 m (7 ft 5 1/4 in)	Mathew Sawe	8 February 2020	Hustopeče	
Iran	2.26 m (7 ft 4 3/4 in)	Keivan Ghanbarzadeh	20 September 2017	Ashgabat	
Sri Lanka	2.26 m (7 ft 4 3/4 in)	Ushan Thiwanka	12 March 2021	Birmingham	
Hong Kong	2.25 m (7 ft 4 1/2 in) A	Marc Chenn	17 February 2001	Colorado Springs	
Zimbabwe	2.24 m (7 ft 4 in)	Kudakwashe Chadenga	17 February 2023	Lubbock	
Venezuela	2.23 m (7 ft 3 3/4 in)	Eure Yáñez	13 February 2018	Sabadell	
Moldova	2.22 m (7 ft 3 1/4 in)	Andrei Miticov	8 February 2015	Chișinău	
Moldova	2.22 m (7 ft 3 1/4 in)	Andrei Miticov	21 February 2015	Istanbul	
Singapore	2.20 m (7 ft 2 1/2 in)	Kampton Kam	10 February 2024	Lynchburg, United States	
Burkina Faso	2.19 m (7 ft 2 in)	Boubacar Séré	20 January 2008	Leverkusen	
Cayman Islands	2.19 m (7 ft 2 in)	Louis Gordon	22 February 2020	Boston	
Luxembourg	2.17 m (7 ft 1 1/4 in)	Raymond Conzemius	26 March 1988	Dortmund	
British Virgin Islands	2.16 m (7 ft 1 in)	Sam Noel	31 January 1998	Lexington	
Argentina	2.16 m (7 ft 1 in) A	Carlos Layoy	2 February 2020	Cochabamba	
Argentina	2.16 m (7 ft 1 in) A	Carlos Layoy	20 February 2022	Cochabamba	
Thailand	2.15 m (7 ft 1/2 in)	Torlaph Sudjinta	13 November 2005	Pattaya	
Philippines	2.15 m (7 ft 1/2 in)	Leonard Grospe	12 February 2023	Astana	
Pakistan	2.14 m (7 ft 1/4 in)	Sharoz Khan	11 February 2023	Astana	
Bahrain	2.13 m (6 ft 11 3/4 in)	Salem Nasser Bakheet	10 February 2006	Pattaya	
Aruba	2.11 m (6 ft 11 in)	Wuill Vrolijk	1 March 2026	Apeldoorn	
Chinese Taipei	2.10 m (6 ft 10 1/2 in)	Hsiang Chun-hsien	16 February 2014	Hangzhou	
Turks and Caicos Islands	2.10 m (6 ft 10 1/2 in)	Kivarno Handfield	2 December 2017	Winston-Salem	
Fiji	2.10 m (6 ft 10 1/2 in)	Rusiate Matai	8 February 2025	Maryville	
Ghana	2.08 m (6 ft 9 3/4 in)	Kingsley Adams	3 March 1973	Kansas City	
United Arab Emirates	2.08 m (6 ft 9 3/4 in)	Sayed Abbas Al-Alaoui	25 February 2010	Tehran	
Namibia	2.08 m (6 ft 9 3/4 in)	Johannes Blaauw	27 January 2018	Ancona	
Montenegro	2.08 m (6 ft 9 3/4 in)	Darko Pešić	6 February 2021	Belgrade	
Indonesia	2.00 m (6 ft 6 1/2 in)	Syahrial	30 October 2007	Macau	
Indonesia	2.00 m (6 ft 6 1/2 in)	Dwiky Firmansyah	6 February 2026	Tianjin	
Macau	2.00 m (6 ft 6 1/2 in)	Ng Chi Kit	6 February 2026	Tianjin	
Angola	1.96 m (6 ft 5 in)	António Afonso Deslandes	16 February 1991	Aveiro	
Tunisia	1.95 m (6 ft 4 3/4 in)	Hamdi Dhouibi	28 February 2003	Saint-Étienne	
Bolivia	1.95 m (6 ft 4 3/4 in) A	José Camacho	6 February 2022	Cochabamba	
Uganda	1.91 m (6 ft 3 in)	Joseph Wananda	16 January 2016	Menomonie	
Paraguay	1.82 m (5 ft 11 1/2 in)	Alexander Männel	24 January 2025	Lynchburg	
Malta	1.74 m (5 ft 8 1/2 in) (Note: not ratified by MAAA but recognized by World Athletics)	Kevin Cranmer	6 January 2018	Sheffield	
Afghanistan	1.70 m (5 ft 6 3/4 in)	Said Gilani	15 February 2014	Hamburg	
Gibraltar	1.61 m (5 ft 3 1/4 in)	Benjamin Power	25 February 2023	Lancaster	

=== Women ===
Country	Mark	Athlete	Date	Place	Ref.
Sweden	2.08 m (6 ft 9 3/4 in)	Kajsa Bergqvist	4 February 2006	Arnstadt	
Germany	2.07 m (6 ft 9 1/4 in)	Heike Henkel	8 February 1992	Karlsruhe	
Croatia	2.06 m (6 ft 9 in)	Blanka Vlašić	6 February 2010	Arnstadt	
Ukraine	2.06 m (6 ft 9 in)	Yaroslava Mahuchikh	2 February 2021	Banská Bystrica	
Belgium	2.05 m (6 ft 8 1/2 in)	Tia Hellebaut	3 March 2007	Birmingham	
Italy	2.04 m (6 ft 8 1/4 in)	Antonietta Di Martino	9 February 2011	Banská Bystrica	
Romania	2.03 m (6 ft 7 3/4 in)	Monica Iagar	23 January 1999	Bucharest	
Poland	2.02 m (6 ft 7 1/2 in)	Kamila Lićwinko	21 February 2015	Toruń	
Lithuania	2.01 m (6 ft 7 in)	Airinė Palšytė	4 March 2017	Belgrade	
Norway	2.00 m (6 ft 6 1/2 in)	Hanne Haugland	17 February 1995	Spała	
Norway	2.00 m (6 ft 6 1/2 in)	Hanne Haugland	8 March 1997	Paris	
Serbia	2.00 m (6 ft 6 1/2 in)	Angelina Topić	24 February 2026	Banská Bystrica	
Jamaica	2.00 m (6 ft 6 1/2 in)	Lamara Distin	24 February 2024	Fayetteville	
Great Britain	1.99 m (6 ft 6 1/4 in)	Morgan Lake	4 February 2023	Hustopeče	
Kazakhstan	1.98 m (6 ft 5 3/4 in)	Svetlana Zalevskaya	2 March 1996	Samara	
Kazakhstan	1.98 m (6 ft 5 3/4 in)	Nadezhda Dubovitskaya	19 March 2022	Belgrade	
Barbados	1.98 m (6 ft 5 3/4 in)	Akela Jones	11 March 2016	Birmingham	
France	1.97 m (6 ft 5 1/2 in)	Mélanie Melfort	5 February 2003	Dortmund	
France	1.97 m (6 ft 5 1/2 in)	Mélanie Melfort	18 February 2007	Aubière	
Slovakia	1.96 m (6 ft 5 in)	Mária Melová	12 February 1997	Banská Bystrica	
Slovakia	1.96 m (6 ft 5 in)	Mária Melová	27 February 1999	Otterberg	
Finland	1.96 m (6 ft 5 in)	Ella Junnila	7 March 2021	Toruń	
Netherlands	1.96 m (6 ft 5 in)	Britt Weerman	3 February 2023	Weinheim	
Moldova	1.94 m (6 ft 4 1/4 in)	Lyudmila Sukhoroslova	24 January 1988	Zaporizhzhya	
Moldova	1.94 m (6 ft 4 1/4 in)	Olga Bolşova	20 January 1992	Chişinău	
Moldova	1.94 m (6 ft 4 1/4 in)	Olga Bolşova	28 February 1994	Piraeus	
Moldova	1.94 m (6 ft 4 1/4 in)	Olga Bolşova	10 March 1996	Stockholm	
Argentina	1.94 m (6 ft 4 1/4 in)	Solange Witteveen	9 February 2000	Brno	
Israel	1.94 m (6 ft 4 1/4 in)	Danielle Frenkel	5 March 2011	Paris	
Estonia	1.94 m (6 ft 4 1/4 in)	Anna Iljuštšenko	2 February 2013	Arnstadt	
Thailand	1.93 m (6 ft 3 3/4 in)	Noengrothai Chaipetch	2 November 2009	Hanoi	
Cyprus	1.93 m (6 ft 3 3/4 in)	Leontia Kallenou	13 March 2015	Fayetteville	
Guinea	1.92 m (6 ft 3 1/2 in)	Fatoumata Balley	17 January 2026	Hirson	
Japan	1.91 m (6 ft 3 in)	Megumi Sato	15 January 1986	Osaka	
Japan	1.91 m (6 ft 3 in)	Megumi Sato	11 February 1989	Osaka	
Japan	1.91 m (6 ft 3 in)	Megumi Sato	11 March 1990	Yokohama	
Japan	1.91 m (6 ft 3 in)	Miki Imai	25 February 1998	Beijing	
Japan	1.91 m (6 ft 3 in)	Miki Imai	15 February 2001	Stockholm	
Japan	1.91 m (6 ft 3 in)	Miki Imai	5 February 2003	Dortmund	
Iceland	1.90 m (6 ft 2 3/4 in)	Þórdis Gísladóttir	12 March 1983	Pontiac	
Armenia	1.89 m (6 ft 2 1/4 in)	Marina Kuporosova	24 January 1988	Baku	
Bosnia and Herzegovina	1.88 m (6 ft 2 in)	Samra Tanović-Bjelica	30 January 1986	Vienna	
Portugal	1.88 m (6 ft 2 in)	Naide Gomes	5 March 2004	Budapest	
Colombia	1.87 m (6 ft 1 1/2 in)	Jennifer Rodríguez	26 February 2022	Brno	
Colombia	1.87 m (6 ft 1 1/2 in)	María Arboleda	26 February 2026	College Station	
Chinese Taipei	1.84 m (6 ft 1/4 in)	Su Chun-yueh	4 March 1989	Budapest	
Luxembourg	1.84 m (6 ft 1/4 in)	Elodie Tshilumba	7 February 2015	Kirchberg	
Bahamas	1.83 m (6 ft 0 in)	Kenya Culmer	2 March 2014	Cedar Falls	
Ghana	1.83 m (6 ft 0 in)	Abigail Kwarteng	14 January 2022	Nashville	
Puerto Rico	1.82 m (5 ft 11 1/2 in)	Courteney Campbell	12 February 2022	New York City	
Burkina Faso	1.81 m (5 ft 11 1/4 in)	Irène Tiéndrebeogo	15 February 1998	Bordeaux	
U.S. Virgin Islands	1.80 m (5 ft 10 3/4 in)	Yashira Rhymer-Stuart	18 January 2019	Indianapolis	
Uruguay	1.79 m (5 ft 10 1/4 in) A	Lorena Aires	2 February 2020	Cochabamba	
Sri Lanka	1.75 m (5 ft 8 3/4 in)	Priyangika Madumanthi	2 November 2009	Hanoi	
Bolivia	1.74 m (5 ft 8 1/2 in)	Carla Rios	15 May 2021	Santa Cruz de la Sierra	
Peru	1.73 m (5 ft 8 in)	Daniella Munoz	19 February 2021	Allendale	
Venezuela	1.72 m (5 ft 7 1/2 in)	Yoveinny Mota	29 January 2022	Lubbock	
British Virgin Islands	1.72 m (5 ft 7 1/2 in) A	Xiomara Malone	25 February 2022	Albuquerque	
Belize	1.71 m (5 ft 7 1/4 in)	Katy Sealy	20 December 2015	London	
Namibia	1.65 m (5 ft 4 3/4 in)	Natalie Louw	28 February 2021	Birmingham	
Angola	1.64 m (5 ft 4 1/2 in)	Xenia Fortes	15 February 1998	Espinho	
Bahrain	1.60 m (5 ft 2 3/4 in)	Mariam Mohamed Al-Ansari	26 February 2010	Doha	
Tunisia	1.57 m (5 ft 1 3/4 in)	Farah Jaziri	5 February 2005	Nogent-sur-Oise	
Tunisia	1.57 m (5 ft 1 3/4 in)	Farah Jaziri	20 February 2005	Liévin	
Bangladesh	1.55 m (5 ft 1 in)	Sathi Parveen	12 October 2001	Rasht	
Pakistan	1.50 m (4 ft 11 in)	Rozina Shafqat	26 September 2005	Tehran	
Macau	1.50 m (4 ft 11 in)	Ng Ka Man	31 October 2007	Macau	
Macau	1.50 m (4 ft 11 in)	Ng Ka Ian	31 October 2007	Macau	
Kenya	1.50 m (4 ft 11 in)	Ananda Maende	16 December 2018	Orléans	
Kenya	1.50 m (4 ft 11 in)	Ananda Maende	20 January 2019	Orléans	
Qatar	1.45 m (4 ft 9 in)	Fayza Abdulnaser Omar	26 February 2010	Doha	
