= Athletics at the 1983 Summer Universiade – Men's high jump =

The men's high jump event at the 1983 Summer Universiade was held at the Commonwealth Stadium in Edmonton, Canada on 5 and 7 July 1983.

== Medalists ==
Gold	Silver	Bronze
Igor Paklin; Soviet Union	Eddy Annys; Belgium	Clarence Saunders; Bermuda

== Results ==
=== Qualification ===
Rank	Athlete	Nationality	Result	Notes
?	Eddy Annys	Belgium	2.16	Q
?	Clarence Saunders	Bermuda	2.16	Q
?	Milton Ottey	Canada	2.16	Q
?	Alain Metellus	Canada	2.16	Q
?	Cai Shu	China	2.16	Q
?	Juan Aizpurua	Cuba	2.16	Q
?	Jorge Luis Alfaro	Cuba	2.16	Q
?	Giovanni Da Vito	Italy	2.16	Q
?	Mirosław Włodarczyk	Poland	2.16	Q
?	Jacek Wszoła	Poland	2.16	Q
?	Moussa Sagna Fall	Senegal	2.16	Q
?	Igor Paklin	Soviet Union	2.16	Q
?	Yuriy Shevchenko	Soviet Union	2.16	Q
?	Roland Egger	Switzerland	2.16	Q
?	Leo Williams	United States	2.16	Q
?	James Barrineau	United States	2.16	Q
?	Gerd Nagel	West Germany	2.16	Q
?	André Schneider	West Germany	2.16	Q
?	Novica Čanović	Yugoslavia	2.16	Q
?	Hrvoje Fižuleto	Yugoslavia	2.16	Q
21	Peter Soetewey	Belgium	2.13	
?	Orlando Bonifacio	Angola	2.10	
?	Mark Barratt	Australia	2.10	
?	Ioakim Trikaliaris	Greece	2.10	
?	Marco Tamberi	Italy	2.10	
26	Cláudio Freire	Brazil	2.05	
27	Renato Bortolocci	Brazil	2.00	

=== Final ===
Rank	Athlete	Nationality	Result	Notes
1st place, gold medalist(s)	Igor Paklin	Soviet Union	2.31	UR
2nd place, silver medalist(s)	Eddy Annys	Belgium	2.29	
3rd place, bronze medalist(s)	Clarence Saunders	Bermuda	2.26	
4	Juan Aizpurua	Cuba	2.26	
5	Alain Metellus	Canada	2.26	
6	Cai Shu	China	2.23	
7	Yuriy Shevchenko	Soviet Union	2.23	
7	Leo Williams	United States	2.23	
7	Moussa Sagna Fall	Senegal	2.23	
10	Jorge Luis Alfaro	Cuba	2.23	
11	Mirosław Włodarczyk	Poland	2.20	
11	Giovanni Da Vito	Italy	2.20	
11	Jacek Wszoła	Poland	2.20	
11	Hrvoje Fižuleto	Yugoslavia	2.20	
15	Milton Ottey	Canada	2.20	
15	James Barrineau	United States	2.20	
17	Roland Egger	Switzerland	2.15	
18	André Schneider	West Germany	2.15	
18	Gerd Nagel	West Germany	2.15	
20	Novica Čanović	Yugoslavia	2.10	
