= Athletics at the 1987 Summer Universiade – Men's high jump =

The men's high jump event at the 1987 Summer Universiade was held at the Stadion Maksimir in Zagreb on 18 and 19 July 1987.

== Medalists ==
Gold	Silver	Bronze
James Lott; United States	Sašo Apostolovski; Yugoslavia	Sorin Matei; Romania

== Results ==
=== Qualification ===
Rank	Group	Athlete	Nationality	1.85	1.90	1.95	2.00	2.05	2.09	2.13	2.17	2.20	Result	Notes
?	?	Igor Paklin	Soviet Union	–	–	–	–	–	–	–	–	o	2.20	Q
?	?	Geoff Parsons	Great Britain	–	–	–	–	–	–	o	o	o	2.20	Q
?	?	Sašo Apostolovski	Yugoslavia	–	–	–	–	–	o	o	o	o	2.20	Q
?	?	Zhu Jianhua	China	–	–	–	o	–	o	–	–	o	2.20	Q
?	?	Jean-Charles Gicquel	France	–	–	–	–	–	o	o	xo	x	2.20	Q
?	?	Kosmas Mikhalopoulos	Greece	–	–	–	o	–	o	xo	o		2.20	Q
?	?	James Lott	United States										2.20	Q
?	?	Sorin Matei	Romania										2.20	Q
?	?	Rudolf Povarnitsyn	Soviet Union										2.20	Q
?	?	Krzysztof Krawczyk	Poland										2.20	Q
?	?	Luca Toso	Italy										2.20	Q
?	?	Mark Reed	United States										2.20	Q
?	?	Evgeni Peev	Bulgaria										2.20	Q
?	?	Matthias Grebenstein	East Germany										2.20	Q
?	?	Dariusz Zielke	Poland										2.20	Q
?	?	Miguel Moral	Spain	–	–	–	xo	xo	–	o	o	x	2.17	
?	?	Marc Howard	Australia	–	–	–	o	o	o	xo	xxo		2.17	
?	?	Panagiotis Kontaxakis	Greece										2.17	
?	?	Hrvoje Fižuleto	Yugoslavia										2.17	
?	?	Róbert Ruffini	Czechoslovakia										2.17	
?	?	Gustavo Adolfo Becker	Spain	–	–	–	–	o	–	o	x		2.13	
?	?	Motochika Inoue	Japan										2.13	
?	?	Antonios Stavrou	Cyprus										2.13	
?	?	Sivabalan Kesavan	Malaysia										2.05	
?	?	Demetrios Theocharous	Cyprus										2.05	
26	?	Gustave Boukaka	Republic of the Congo										2.00	
27	?	Murat Ayaydın	Turkey										1.90	
28	?	Julio Bolanos	Guatemala										1.85	

=== Final ===
Rank	Athlete	Nationality	2.10	2.15	2.20	2.24	2.27	2.30	Result	Notes
1st place, gold medalist(s)	James Lott	United States	–	–	o	o	xo	o	2.30	
2nd place, silver medalist(s)	Sašo Apostolovski	Yugoslavia							2.30	
3rd place, bronze medalist(s)	Sorin Matei	Romania							2.30	
4	Rudolf Povarnitsyn	Soviet Union							2.27	
5	Zhu Jianhua	China							2.27	
6	Krzysztof Krawczyk	Poland							2.24	
6	Geoff Parsons	Great Britain							2.24	
8	Luca Toso	Italy							2.24	
9	Igor Paklin	Soviet Union							2.24	
10	Mark Reed	United States							2.24	
11	Evgeni Peev	Bulgaria							2.20	
12	Matthias Grebenstein	East Germany							2.20	
13	Jean-Charles Gicquel	France							2.15	
13	Kosmas Mikhalopoulos	Greece							2.15	
15	Dariusz Zielke	Poland							2.15	
