= Athletics at the 1985 Summer Universiade – Men's high jump =

The men's high jump event at the 1985 Summer Universiade was held at the Kobe Universiade Memorial Stadium in Kobe on 3 and 4 September 1985.

== Medalists ==
Gold	Silver	Bronze
Igor Paklin; Soviet Union	Francisco Centelles; Cuba	Gerd Nagel; West Germany

== Results ==
=== Qualification ===
Rank	Group	Athlete	Nationality	Result	Notes
?	?	André Schneider-Laub	West Germany	2.20	
?	?	Darren Burton	United States	2.20	
?	?	Igor Paklin	Soviet Union	2.20	
?	?	Alain Metellus	Canada	2.20	
?	?	Novica Čanović	Yugoslavia	2.20	
?	?	Sašo Apostolovski	Yugoslavia	2.20	
?	?	Aleksandr Kotovich	Soviet Union	2.20	
?	?	Satoru Nonaka	Japan	2.20	
?	?	Gerd Nagel	West Germany	2.20	
?	?	Gian Piero Palomba	Italy	2.20	
?	?	Clarence Saunders	Bermuda	2.20	
?	?	Maurice Crumby	United States	2.20	
?	?	Javier Sotomayor	Cuba	2.20	
?	?	Milton Ottey	Canada	2.20	
?	?	Francisco Centelles	Cuba	2.20	
?	?	Dominique Hernandez	France	2.18	
?	?	Raymond Conzemius	Luxembourg	2.18	
?	?	Kosmas Mikhalopoulos	Greece	2.18	
?	?	Atsushi Inaoka	Japan	2.10	
?	?	Constantin Militaru	Romania	2.10	
?	?	Casimir Ogmore Okoro	Nigeria	2.10	
22	?	Ibrahima Ebou Sillah	Gambia	2.05	

=== Final ===
Rank	Athlete	Nationality	2.15	2.20	2.26	2.29	2.31	2.33	2.35	2.41	2.43	Result	Notes
1st place, gold medalist(s)	Igor Paklin	Soviet Union	–	o	o	xo	o	o	o	xxo	xxx	2.41	WR
2nd place, silver medalist(s)	Francisco Centelles	Cuba										2.31	
3rd place, bronze medalist(s)	Gerd Nagel	West Germany										2.26	
4	Milton Ottey	Canada										2.26	
5	Aleksandr Kotovich	Soviet Union										2.26	
6	Alain Metellus	Canada										2.26	
7	Sašo Apostolovski	Yugoslavia										2.23	
8	Novica Čanović	Yugoslavia										2.23	
9	Satoru Nonaka	Japan										2.23	
10	Gian Piero Palomba	Italy										2.20	
10	Javier Sotomayor	Cuba										2.20	
12	André Schneider-Laub	West Germany										2.20	
13	Maurice Crumby	United States										2.15	
14	Darren Burton	United States										2.15	
	Clarence Saunders	Bermuda										NM	
