= Athletics at the 1981 Summer Universiade – Men's high jump =

The men's high jump event at the 1981 Summer Universiade was held at the Stadionul Naţional in Bucharest on 21 and 22 July 1981.

== Medalists ==
Gold	Silver	Bronze
Leo Williams; United States	Zhu Jianhua; China	Gerd Nagel; West Germany

== Results ==
=== Qualification ===
Qualifying mark: 2.16 m

Rank	Athlete	Nationality	Result	Notes
?	Martí Perarnau	Spain	2.16	Q
?	Miguel Ángel Moral	Spain	2.16	Q
?	Bruno Bruni	Italy	2.16	Q
?	Leo Williams	United States	2.16	Q
?	Zhu Jianhua	China	2.16	Q
?	Gerd Nagel	West Germany	2.16	Q
?	Danial Temim	Yugoslavia	2.16	Q
?	Josef Harabal	Czechoslovakia	2.16	Q
?	Aleksey Demyanyuk	Soviet Union	2.16	Q
?	Dariusz Zielke	Poland	2.16	Q
?	István Szeles	Hungary	2.16	Q
?	Ba El Hadj	Senegal	2.16	Q
?	Wolfgang Tschirk	Austria	2.16	Q
?	Eddy Annys	Belgium	2.16	Q
?	Marc Borra	Belgium	2.16	Q
?	Moussa Sagna Fall	Senegal	2.12	
?	Mihail Minoudis	Greece	2.12	
?	Daniel Albu	Romania	2.12	
?	Sorin Matei	Romania	2.12	
?	Silvano Stella	Italy	2.08	
?	Dominique Hernandez	France	2.08	
?	Carlos Acosta	Puerto Rico	2.08	
?	József Jámbor	Hungary	2.08	
?	Jorge Alfaro	Cuba	2.08	
?	Seppo Haavisto	Finland	2.08	
?	Abdenour Krim	Algeria	2.04	
?	Casimir Ogmore Okoro	Nigeria	2.04	
?	Hedi Jalil Khifan	Iraq	2.04	
29	Holger Marten	West Germany	2.00	

=== Final ===
Rank	Athlete	Nationality	Result	Notes
1st place, gold medalist(s)	Leo Williams	United States	2.25	
2nd place, silver medalist(s)	Zhu Jianhua	China	2.25	
3rd place, bronze medalist(s)	Gerd Nagel	West Germany	2.25	
4	Danial Temim	Yugoslavia	2.22	
5	Josef Harabal	Czechoslovakia	2.22	
6	Aleksey Demyanyuk	Soviet Union	2.18	
7	Dariusz Zielke	Poland	2.18	
8	István Szeles	Hungary	2.18	
9	Ba El Hadj	Senegal	2.18	
10	Wolfgang Tschirk	Austria	2.18	
10	Eddy Annys	Belgium	2.18	
12	Marc Borra	Belgium	2.18	
13	Martí Perarnau	Spain	2.18	
13	Bruno Bruni	Italy	2.14	
15	Miguel Ángel Moral	Spain	2.10	
