= 1983 World Championships in Athletics – Men's high jump =

These are the official results of the men's high jump event at the 1983 IAAF World Championships in Helsinki, Finland. There were a total of 38 participating athletes, with the qualifying with two groups held on 12 August 1983 and the final held on 13 August.

== Medalists ==
Gold	Hennadiy Avdyeyenko; Soviet Union (URS)
Silver	Tyke Peacock; United States (USA)
Bronze	Zhu Jianhua; China (CHN)

== Schedule ==
- All times are Eastern European Time (UTC+2)

Qualification Round
Group A	Group B
12.08.1983 – ??:??h	12.08.1983 – ??:??h
Final Round
13.08.1983 – ??:??h

== Records ==
Standing records prior to the 1983 World Athletics Championships
World Record	Zhu Jianhua (CHN)	2.37 m	June 11, 1983	Beijing, PR China
Event Record	New event			

== Results ==
=== Qualifying round ===
- Held on Friday 1983-08-12

Rank	Group	Name	Nationality	1.95	2.00	2.05	2.10	2.15	2.18	2.21	Result	Notes
1	A	Leo Williams	United States								2.21	q
2	A	Francisco Centelles	Cuba								2.21	q
3	A	Takao Sakamoto	Japan								2.18	
4	A	Takashi Katamine	Japan								2.18	
5	A	Othmane Belfaa	Algeria								2.15	
5	A	Moussa Sagna Fall	Senegal								2.15	
7	A	Eugen-Cristian Popescu	Romania								2.15	
8	A	Roberto Cabrejas	Spain								2.15	
8	A	Clarence Saunders	Bermuda								2.15	
8	A	Wolfgang Tschirk	Austria								2.15	
11	A	Jouko Kilpi	Finland								2.10	
11	A	Constantin Militaru	Romania								2.10	
13	A	Gianni Davito	Italy								2.10	
13	A	Alain Metellus	Canada								2.10	
15	A	Liu Chin-chiang	Chinese Taipei								2.00	
16	A	Alphonse Gaglozoun	Benin								1.95	
16	A	France-Henry Lisette	Mauritius								1.95	
	A	Ardeshir Ghandoomi	Iran								NM	
	A	Joseph Rajo	Sudan								DNS	
1	B	Igor Paklin	Soviet Union								2.24	Q
1	B	Milton Ottey	Canada								2.24	Q
1	B	Zhu Jianhua	China								2.24	Q
4	B	Carlo Thränhardt	West Germany								2.21	q
4	B	Hennadiy Avdyeyenko	Soviet Union								2.21	q
4	B	Sorin Matei	Romania								2.21	q
4	B	Valeriy Sereda	Soviet Union								2.21	q
4	B	Dwight Stones	United States								2.21	q
4	B	Patrik Sjöberg	Sweden								2.21	q
10	B	Jacek Wszoła	Poland								2.21	q
10	B	Luca Toso	Italy								2.21	q
12	B	Paul Frommeyer	West Germany								2.21	q
13	B	Eddy Annys	Belgium								2.21	q
14	B	Dietmar Mögenburg	West Germany								2.21	q
15	B	Tyke Peacock	United States								2.21	q
16	B	Roland Dalhäuser	Switzerland								2.15	
17	B	Dariusz Biczysko	Poland								2.15	
18	B	Franck Verzy	France								2.10	
18	B	Stephen Wray	Bahamas								2.10	

=== Final ===
Rank	Name	Nationality	2.10	2.15	2.19	2.23	2.26	2.29	2.32	2.34	Result	Notes
1st place, gold medalist(s)	Hennadiy Avdyeyenko	Soviet Union	–	o	o	o	o	xo	o	xxx	2.32	
2nd place, silver medalist(s)	Tyke Peacock	United States	–	o	o	xo	o	o	xxo	xxx	2.32	
3rd place, bronze medalist(s)	Zhu Jianhua	China	–	o	o	o	o	o	xxx		2.29	
4	Dietmar Mögenburg	West Germany	–	o	o	xo	–	o	xxx		2.29	
4	Igor Paklin	Soviet Union	o	o	o	o	xo	o	xxx		2.29	
6	Dwight Stones	United States	–	o	o	o	o	xxo	xxx		2.29	
7	Carlo Thränhardt	West Germany	–	o	o	o	o	–	xxx		2.26	
8	Valeriy Sereda	Soviet Union	o	o	xo	o	o	xxx			2.26	
9	Milton Ottey	Canada	–	xo	o	o	o	xxx			2.26	
10	Luca Toso	Italy	o	xo	o	xxo	xxo	xxx			2.26	
11	Patrik Sjöberg	Sweden	–	o	x–	o	xxx				2.23	
12	Leo Williams	United States	–	o	xo	xo	xxx				2.23	
13	Jacek Wszoła	Poland	–	o	–	xxo	–	xxx			2.23	
14	Eddy Annys	Belgium	–	–	o	xxx					2.19	
15	Francisco Centelles	Cuba	–	–	xxo	xxx					2.19	
16	Paul Frommeyer	West Germany	xo	xo	xo	xxx					2.19	
17	Sorin Matei	Romania	o	xxo	xxx						2.15	

== See also ==
- 1980 Men's Olympic High Jump (Moscow)
- 1982 Men's European Championships High Jump (Athens)
- 1984 Men's Olympic High Jump (Los Angeles)
- 1986 Men's European Championships High Jump (Stuttgart)
- 1987 Men's World Championships High Jump (Rome)
