= Athletics at the Friendship Games – Men's high jump =

The men's high jump event at the Friendship Games was held on 18 August 1984 at the Grand Arena of the Central Lenin Stadium in Moscow, Soviet Union. The competition took place in a pouring rain which affected the results. Two Soviet athletes starting out of competition recorded better results than the official medallists.

== Results ==
Rank	Name	Nationality	Result	Notes
	Vladimir Granyenkov	Soviet Union	2.31	
	Gennadiy Avdeyenko	Soviet Union	2.??	
1st place, gold medalist(s)	Valeriy Sereda	Soviet Union	2.25	
2nd place, silver medalist(s)	Javier Sotomayor	Cuba	2.25	
3rd place, bronze medalist(s)	Dariusz Zielke	Poland	2.20	
4	Jorge Alfaro	Cuba	2.15	
4	Francisco Centelles	Cuba	2.15	
4	Oleksiy Demyanyuk	Soviet Union	2.15	
4	Jacek Wszoła	Poland	2.15	
8	Sergey Zasimovich	Soviet Union	2.15	
9	Fernando Valiente	Peru	1.95	
10	N. El Saied	Lebanon	1.80	

== See also ==
- Athletics at the 1984 Summer Olympics – Men's high jump
