= 1983 European Athletics Indoor Championships – Men's high jump =

The men's high jump event at the 1983 European Athletics Indoor Championships was held on 5 March.

== Results ==
Rank	Name	Nationality	Result	Notes
1st place, gold medalist(s)	Carlo Thränhardt	West Germany	2.32	
2nd place, silver medalist(s)	Gerd Nagel	West Germany	2.30	
3rd place, bronze medalist(s)	Mirosław Włodarczyk	Poland	2.27	
3rd place, bronze medalist(s)	Massimo Di Giorgio	Italy	2.27	
5	Gennadiy Avdeyenko	Soviet Union	2.27	
6	Andreas Surbeck	West Germany	2.27	
7	Eugen-Cristian Popescu	Romania	2.24	
8	Dariusz Zielke	Poland	2.24	
9	Sergey Zasimovich	Soviet Union	2.24	
10	Dariusz Biczysko	Poland	2.24	
11	Marco Tamberi	Italy	2.20	
12	William Motti	France	2.20	
13	Tibor Gerstenbrein	Hungary	2.20	
14	Gyula Németh	Hungary	2.20	
15	Novica Čanović	Yugoslavia	2.20	
16	Georgi Gadzhev	Bulgaria	2.10	
17	Gennadiy Belkov	Soviet Union	2.10	
	Patrik Sjöberg	Sweden	NM	
	Roberto Cabrejas	Spain	NM	
