= 1987 IAAF World Indoor Championships – Men's high jump =

The men's high jump event at the 1987 IAAF World Indoor Championships was held at the Hoosier Dome in Indianapolis on 6 and 7 March.

== Medalists ==
Gold	Silver	Bronze
Igor Paklin; Soviet Union	Hennadiy Avdyeyenko; Soviet Union	Ján Zvara; Czechoslovakia

== Results ==
=== Qualification ===
Qualification: 2.24 (Q) or at least 12 best performers (q) qualified for the final.

Rank	Name	Nationality	Result	Notes
1	Hennadiy Avdyeyenko	Soviet Union	2.24	Q
1	Jimmy Howard	United States	2.24	Q
1	Sorin Matei	Romania	2.24	Q
1	Milton Ottey	Canada	2.24	Q
1	Igor Paklin	Soviet Union	2.24	Q
1	Patrik Sjöberg	Sweden	2.24	Q
1	Javier Sotomayor	Cuba	2.24	Q
1	Carlo Thränhardt	West Germany	2.24	Q
9	Roland Dalhäuser	Switzerland	2.24	Q
9	James Lott	United States	2.24	Q
9	Ján Zvara	Czechoslovakia	2.24	Q
12	Zhu Jianhua	China	2.24	Q
12	Dalton Grant	Great Britain	2.24	Q
14	Eugen-Cristian Popescu	Romania	2.20	
15	André Schneider-Laub	West Germany	2.20	
16	Takao Sakamoto	Japan	2.20	
	Judex Lefou	Mauritius	NM	
	Alexis Neophytou	Cyprus	DNS	

=== Final ===
Rank	Name	Nationality	Result	Notes
1st place, gold medalist(s)	Igor Paklin	Soviet Union	2.38	CR, NR
2nd place, silver medalist(s)	Hennadiy Avdyeyenko	Soviet Union	2.38	NR
3rd place, bronze medalist(s)	Ján Zvara	Czechoslovakia	2.34	
4	Javier Sotomayor	Cuba	2.32	AR
5	Roland Dalhäuser	Switzerland	2.32	NR
6	Sorin Matei	Romania	2.32	
7	Milton Ottey	Canada	2.28	
8	Dalton Grant	Great Britain	2.28	
8	Zhu Jianhua	China	2.28	
10	James Lott	United States	2.24	
10	Jimmy Howard	United States	2.24	
	Patrik Sjöberg	Sweden	NM	
	Carlo Thränhardt	West Germany	NM	
