= 1985 IAAF World Indoor Games – Men's high jump =

The men's high jump event at the 1985 IAAF World Indoor Games was held at the Palais Omnisports Paris-Bercy on 18 January.

== Results ==
Rank	Name	Nationality	2.00	2.05	2.10	2.15	2.18	2.21	2.24	2.27	2.30	2.32	2.38	Result	Notes
1st place, gold medalist(s)	Patrik Sjöberg	Sweden	–	–	–	–	–	o	–	o	o	xxo	xxx	2.32	
2nd place, silver medalist(s)	Javier Sotomayor	Cuba	–	–	o	o	–	o	o	o	o	xxx		2.30	
3rd place, bronze medalist(s)	Othmane Belfaa	Algeria	–	–	o	xxo	xo	–	xxo	o	x–	xx		2.27	AR
4	Valeriy Sereda	Soviet Union	–	–	–	–	o	–	o	–	xxx			2.24	
5	Carlo Thränhardt	West Germany	–	–	–	–	–	o	xxo	x–	xx			2.24	
6	Ján Zvara	Czechoslovakia	–	–	o	o	o	o	xxx					2.21	
7	Krzysztof Krawczyk	Poland	–	–	o	xo	o	o	xxx					2.21	
8	Gerd Nagel	West Germany	–	–	o	xxo	o	o	xxx					2.21	
9	Alain Metellus	Canada	–	–	–	o	xo	xxo	–	xxx				2.21	
10	Luca Toso	Italy	–	o	o	o	xxo	xxo	xxx					2.21	
11	Cai Shu	China	o	–	o	o	o	xxx						2.18	
12	Takao Sakamoto	Japan	–	–	xo	o	xo	xxx						2.18	
13	Paolo Borghi	Italy	–	o	o	o	xxx							2.15	
14	Atsushi Inaoka	Japan	–	o	o	xxx								2.10	
14	Dimitrios Kattis	Greece	–	o	o	xxx								2.10	
16	Abdulla Al-Sheib	Qatar	o	o	xxx									2.05	NR
17	Michael Minoudis	Greece	o	xo	xxx									2.05	
18	Nalluswamy Annavi	India	xo	xo										2.05	NR
19	Ezequiel Ortiz	Puerto Rico	xo	xxo	xxx									2.05	NR
20	Mohamed Aghlal	Morocco	xo	xxx										2.00	NR
	Tang Al-Farmain	Kuwait	xxx											NM	
