= Athletics at the 1979 Summer Universiade – Men's high jump =

The men's high jump event at the 1979 Summer Universiade was held at the Estadio Olimpico Universitario in Mexico City on 11 and 13 September 1979.

== Medalists ==
Gold	Silver	Bronze
Gerd Nagel; West Germany	Rolf Beilschmidt; East Germany	Holger Marten; West Germany

== Results ==
=== Qualification ===
Rank	Group	Athlete	Nationality	Result	Notes
?	?	Wolfgang Tschirk	Austria	2.12	Q
?	?	Rolf Beilschmidt	East Germany	2.12	Q
?	?	Paul Tanon	France	2.12	Q
?	?	István Gibicsár	Hungary	2.12	Q
?	?	Gyula Kovács	Hungary	2.12	Q
?	?	Bruno Bruni	Italy	2.12	Q
?	?	Takashi Kitamine	Japan	2.12	Q
?	?	Kazunori Koshikawa	Japan	2.12	Q
?	?	Janusz Trzepizur	Poland	2.12	Q
?	?	Jacek Wszoła	Poland	2.12	Q
?	?	Aleksandr Grigoryev	Soviet Union	2.12	Q
?	?	Francisco Martín	Spain	2.12	Q
?	?	Gail Olson	United States	2.12	Q
?	?	Nat Page	United States	2.12	Q
?	?	Holger Marten	West Germany	2.12	Q
?	?	Gerd Nagel	West Germany	2.12	Q
?	?	Moussa Sagna Fall	Senegal	2.07	
?	?	Kim Yong-ki	South Korea	2.07	
?	?	Rumen Yotsov	Bulgaria	2.07	
?	?	Dimitrios Kattis	Greece	2.07	
?	?	Carlos Casar	Mexico	2.07	
?	?	Gianni Davito	Italy	2.02	
?	?	Amadou Dia	Senegal	2.02	

=== Final ===
Rank	Athlete	Nationality	2.12	2.15	2.18	2.21	2.24	2.26	2.28	2.30	Result	Notes
1st place, gold medalist(s)	Gerd Nagel	West Germany		o	o	o	xxo	o	o		2.28	UR
2nd place, silver medalist(s)	Rolf Beilschmidt	East Germany							xo		2.28	UR
3rd place, bronze medalist(s)	Holger Marten	West Germany						o			2.26	
4	Jacek Wszoła	Poland									2.26	
5	Bruno Bruni	Italy									2.21	
6	Nat Page	United States									2.21	
7	Janusz Trzepizur	Poland									2.21	
8	Gail Olson	United States									2.18	
9	Takashi Kitamine	Japan									2.18	
10	Paul Tanon	France									2.18	
11	Kazunori Koshikawa	Japan									2.18	
12	Francisco Martín	Spain									2.15	
13	István Gibicsár	Hungary									2.15	
14	Aleksandr Grigoryev	Soviet Union									2.12	
15	Wolfgang Tschirk	Austria									2.12	
16	Gyula Kovács	Hungary									2.07	
