= Athletics at the 1983 Pan American Games – Men's high jump =

Men's high jump at the Pan American Games

The men's high jump event at the 1983 Pan American Games was held in Caracas, Venezuela on 28 August.

== Results ==
Rank	Name	Nationality	Result	Notes
1st place, gold medalist(s)	Francisco Centelles	Cuba	2.29	
2nd place, silver medalist(s)	Leo Williams	United States	2.27	
3rd place, bronze medalist(s)	Jorge Luis Alfaro	Cuba	2.25	
4	Jim Barrineau	United States	2.23	
5	Alain Metellus	Canada	2.21	
6	Carlos Acosta	Puerto Rico	2.14	
7	Fernando Pastoriza	Argentina	2.14	
8	Oscar Orta	Venezuela	2.05	
9	Roberto Salazar	Venezuela	2.05	
10	Luciano Bacelli	Brazil	2.00	
