= Gerd Nagel =

German high jumper (born 1957)

Personal information
- Nationality: German
- Born: 22 October 1957 (age 68) Sulingen, Lower Saxony, West Germany
- Height: 1.88 m (6 ft 2 in)
- Weight: 74 kg (163 lb)

Sport
- Country: West Germany
- Sport: Athletics
- Event: High jump
- Club: LG Frankfurt

Achievements and titles
- Personal best: 2.36 m (1989)
Medal record
Men's athletics
Representing West Germany
European Championships
Bronze medal – third place	1982 Athens	High jump
European Indoor Championships
Silver medal – second place	1983 Budapest	High Jump
Bronze medal – third place	1990 Glasgow	High Jump
Summer Universiade
Gold medal – first place	1979 Mexico City	High jump
Bronze medal – third place	1981 Bucharest	High jump
Bronze medal – third place	1985 Kobe	High jump

Gerd Nagel (born 22 October 1957 in Sulingen, Lower Saxony) is a retired West German high jumper.

== Biography ==
He won the 1979 Summer Universiade and finished fourteenth at the 1987 World Championships. At the European Indoor Championships he won the silver in 1983 and a bronze in 1990, and finished fourth in 1982 and thirteenth in 1988.

He represented the sports teams LG Frankfurt and Eintracht Frankfurt and became West German champion in 1979. He also took silver medals in 1980, 1982, 1988 and 1989—every time behind Dietmar Mögenburg—and bronze medals in 1981 and 1987. At the West German indoor championships, Nagel won in 1982 and 1983, took silver in 1986 and 1988, ad bronze in 1987.

His personal best jump was 2.35 metres, achieved in August 1988 in Forbach. This result ranks him fifth among German high jumpers, behind Carlo Thränhardt, Gerd Wessig, Dietmar Mögenburg and Martin Buß. He had a better indoor jump with 2.36 metres, achieved in March 1989 in Sulingen. The Internationales Hochsprung-Meeting Eberstadt in June 1979, when Nagel, Thränhardt and Mögenburg improved the West German record from 2.26 m to 2.30 m, marked the first time three jumpers had cleared this height in the same competition.

== International competitions ==
Year	Competition	Venue	Position	Notes
Representing West Germany
1979	European Indoor Championships	Vienna, Austria	4th	2.24 m
1979	Universiade	Mexico City, Mexico	1st	2.28 m
1980	European Indoor Championships	Sindelfingen, West Germany	13th	2.19 m
1981	Universiade	Bucharest, Romania	3rd	2.25 m
1981	World Cup	Rome, Italy	2nd	2.26 m^{1}
1982	European Indoor Championships	Milan, Italy	4th	2.28 m
1982	European Championships	Athens, Greece	3rd	2.24 m
1983	European Indoor Championships	Budapest, Hungary	2nd	2.30 m
1983	Universiade	Edmonton, Canada	18th	2.15 m
1984	Olympic Games	Los Angeles, United States	18th (q)	2.18 m
1985	World Indoor Games	Paris, France	8th	2.21 m
1985	Universiade	Kobe, Japan	3rd	2.21 m
1986	European Indoor Championships	Madrid, Spain	12th	2.26 m
1987	World Championships	Rome, Italy	14th	2.20 m
1988	European Indoor Championships	Budapest, Hungary	13th	2.15 m
1990	European Indoor Championships	Glasgow, United Kingdom	3rd	2.30 m

^{1}Representing Europe
