= Cai Shu =

Cai Shu may refer to:

- Shu Du of Cai, first ruler of the State of Cai
- Cai Shu (athlete) (born 1962), Chinese retired high jumper
