= Sorin Matei =

Romanian high jumper

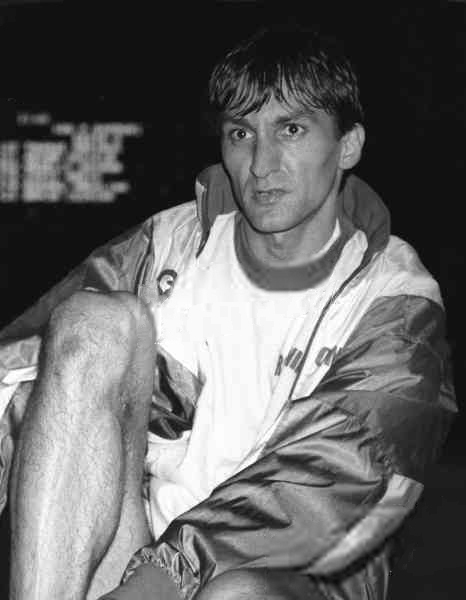
- Matei in 1993

Personal information
- Born: 6 July 1963 (age 63) Bucharest, Romania
- Height: 184 cm (6 ft 0 in)
- Weight: 71 kg (157 lb)

Sport
- Sport: Athletics
- Event: High jump

Achievements and titles
- Personal best: 2.40 m (1990)
Medal record
Representing Romania
European Indoor Championships
Silver medal – second place	1992 Genoa	High jump
Bronze medal – third place	1988 Budapest	High jump
Summer Universiade
Bronze medal – third place	1987 Zagreb	High jump

Sorin Matei (born 6 July 1963) is a retired Romanian high jumper. His personal best jump is 2.40 metres, achieved in June 1990 in Bratislava. As of August 2018, Matei is tied for 7th place on the men's high jump outdoor, all-time top list, behind Javier Sotomayor, Mutaz Essa Barshim, Patrik Sjöberg, Bohdan Bondarenko, Igor Paklin and Ivan Ukhov. Matei competed at the 1980, 1988 and 1992 Olympics and placed 13th in 1980 and 1992.

== International competitions ==
Year	Competition	Venue	Position	Notes
Representing Romania
1980	Olympic Games	Moscow, Soviet Union	13th	2.18 m
1981	Universiade	Bucharest, Romania	16th (q)	2.12 m
1981	European Junior Championships	Utrecht, Netherlands	5th	2.16 m
1982	European Championships	Athens, Greece	17th (q)	2.15 m
1983	World Championships	Helsinki, Finland	17th	2.15 m
1984	European Indoor Championships	Gothenburg, Sweden	11th	2.20 m
1986	European Indoor Championships	Madrid, Spain	5th	2.28 m
1986	Goodwill Games	Moscow, Soviet Union	3rd	2.32 m
1986	European Championships	Stuttgart, West Germany	14th	2.12 m
1987	World Indoor Championships	Indianapolis, United States	5th	2.32 m
1987	Universiade	Zagreb, Yugoslavia	3rd	2.30 m
1987	World Championships	Rome, Italy	6th	2.32 m
1988	European Indoor Championships	Budapest, Hungary	3rd	2.35 m
1988	Olympic Games	Seoul, South Korea	20th (q)	2.19 m
1989	European Indoor Championships	The Hague, Netherlands	5th	2.27 m
1990	Goodwill Games	Seattle, United States	4th	2.30 m
1990	European Indoor Championships	Glasgow, United Kingdom	–	NM
1991	World Indoor Championships	Seville, Spain	6th	2.31 m
1991	World Championships	Tokyo, Japan	16th (q)	2.24 m
1992	European Indoor Championships	Genoa, Italy	2nd	2.36 m
1992	Olympic Games	Barcelona, Spain	13th	2.24 m
1993	World Indoor Championships	Toronto, Canada	9th	2.24 m
1994	European Championships	Helsinki, Finland	20th (q)	2.15 m
1995	World Championships	Gothenburg, Sweden	13th (q)	2.27 m

Sporting positions
Preceded by (Cuba) Javier Sotomayor	Men's High Jump Best Year Performance; 1990	Succeeded by (United States) Hollis Conway (i) (Cuba) Javier Sotomayor (United States) Charles Austin
