= 1985 European Athletics Indoor Championships – Men's high jump =

The men's high jump event at the 1985 European Athletics Indoor Championships was held on 2 March.

== Results ==
Rank	Name	Nationality	2.05	2.10	2.15	2.20	2.24	2.27	2.30	2.33	2.35	2.40	Result	Notes
1st place, gold medalist(s)	Patrik Sjöberg	Sweden	–	–	–	–	o	–	o	o	xxo	xxx	2.35	
2nd place, silver medalist(s)	Aleksandr Kotovich	Soviet Union	–	–	o	o	o	o	o	x–	xx		2.30	
3rd place, bronze medalist(s)	Dariusz Biczysko	Poland	–	–	o	xo	o	xxo	o	xxx			2.30	PB
4	Eddy Annys	Belgium	–	–	o	–	o	xxx					2.24	
4	Gennadiy Avdeyenko	Soviet Union	–	–	o	–	o	xxx					2.24	
6	Dariusz Zielke	Poland	–	o	xo	o	o	xxx					2.24	
7	Giampiero Palomba	Italy	–	o	o	o	xxx						2.20	
7	Ján Zvara	Czechoslovakia	–	o	o	o	xxx						2.20	
9	Milan Machotka	Czechoslovakia	–	o	o	xxo	xxx						2.20	
10	Bengt-Göran Enström	Sweden	–	o	xxo	xxx							2.15	
10	Raymond Conzemius	Luxembourg	o	o	xxo	xxx							2.15	
