= Povarnitsyn =

Povarnitsyn (Russian: Поварницын) is a Russian masculine surname, its feminine counterpart is Povarnitsyna. Notable people with the surname include:

- Alexander Povarnitsyn (born 1994), Russian biathlete
- Rudolf Povarnitsyn (born 1962), Russian athlete
