= 1986 European Athletics Indoor Championships – Men's high jump =

The men's high jump event at the 1986 European Athletics Indoor Championships was held on 22 February.

== Results ==
| Rank | Name | Nationality | 2.10 | 2.15 | 2.20 | 2.24 | 2.28 | 2.31 | 2.34 | Result | Notes |
|---|---|---|---|---|---|---|---|---|---|---|---|
| 1st place, gold medalist(s) | Dietmar Mögenburg | West Germany | – | – | o | – | xo | xo | xxo | 2.34 | |
| 2nd place, silver medalist(s) | Carlo Thränhardt | West Germany | – | – | – | – | – | xo | xxx | 2.31 | |
| 3rd place, bronze medalist(s) | Geoff Parsons | Great Britain | – | o | o | o | o | xxx | | 2.28 | |
| 3rd place, bronze medalist(s) | Eddy Annys | Belgium | – | – | – | o | o | xxx | | 2.28 | |
| 5 | Sorin Matei | Romania | xo | – | o | xxo | xxo | xxx | | 2.28 | |
| 6 | Patrik Sjöberg | Sweden | – | – | – | o | x– | xx | | 2.24 | |
| 6 | Krzysztof Krawczyk | Poland | – | o | o | o | xxx | | | 2.24 | |
| 8 | Ján Zvara | Czechoslovakia | xo | o | o | o | xxx | | | 2.24 | |
| 9 | Dariusz Zielke | Poland | o | xo | o | xo | xxx | | | 2.24 | |
| 10 | Jindřich Vondra | Czechoslovakia | o | o | o | xxo | xxx | | | 2.24 | |
| 10 | Aleksandr Kotovich | Soviet Union | – | o | o | xxo | x– | xx | | 2.24 | |
| 12 | Gerd Nagel | West Germany | – | – | o | xxx | | | | 2.20 | |
| 13 | Novica Čanović | Yugoslavia | o | – | xo | xxx | | | | 2.20 | |
| 13 | Miguel Moral | Spain | o | o | xo | xxx | | | | 2.20 | |
| 15 | Gustavo Adolfo Becker | Spain | o | xxx | | | | | | 2.10 | |
