= Jim Howard (high jumper) =

American high jumper (born 1959)

Personal information
- Nationality: American
- Born: September 11, 1959 (age 66)

Sport
- Sport: Athletics
- Event: High jump

James Allen Howard (born September 11, 1959) is an American retired high jumper.

== Biography ==
Howard competed for the Texas A&M Aggies track and field team in the NCAA.

He finished second at the 1985 IAAF World Cup, tenth at the 1987 World Indoor Championships and at the 1988 Summer Olympics. He won the US national title in 1984.

His personal best jump is 2.36 metres, achieved in June 1987 in Rehlingen.

Howard finished second behind fellow American Leo Williams at the British 1983 AAA Championships.
