= Dariusz Biczysko =

Polish high jumper

Personal information
- Born: 25 June 1962 (age 63) Zielona Góra, Poland
- Height: 1.90 m (6 ft 3 in)
- Weight: 78 kg (172 lb)

Sport
- Sport: Athletics
- Event: High jump
- Club: Lubtour Zielona Góra

Dariusz Biczysko (born 25 June 1962) is a Polish former athlete who specialised in the high jump. He won a bronze medal at the 1985 European Indoor Championships. In addition, he represented his country at the 1983 World Championships without qualifying for the final.

His personal bests in the event are 2.28 metres outdoors (Birmingham 1983) and 2.30 metres indoors (Piraeus 1985).

== International competitions ==
Year	Competition	Venue	Position	Notes
Representintg Poland
1981	European Junior Championships	Utrecht, Netherlands	7th	2.16 m
1983	European Indoor Championships	Budapest, Hungary	10th	2.24 m
1983	World Championships	Helsinki, Finland	21st (q)	2.15 m
1985	European Indoor Championships	Piraeus, Greece	3rd	2.30 m
