= Paul Frommeyer =

West German high jumper

Paul Frommeyer (born 28 June 1957 in Ibbenbüren) is a West German retired high jumper.

== Life ==
Frommeyer finished sixteenth at the 1983 World Championships. At the West German Championships he won the silver medal in 1977 and the bronze in 1983, representing the clubs DJK Arminia Ibbenbüren and TV Wattenscheid.

His personal best was 2.34 metres, achieved in June 1983 in Recke.
