= Jorge Alfaro (athlete) =

Cuban high jumper (born 1962)

Personal information
- Nationality: Cuban
- Born: 10 June 1962 (age 64)

Sport
- Sport: Athletics
- Event: High jump
Medal record
Representing Cuba
Pan American Games
| Bronze medal – third place | 1983 Caracas | High jump |

Jorge Luis Alfaro Quiñones (born 10 June 1962) is a Cuban high jumper.

He made his mark with two medals in the u-17 class at the 1978 Central American and Caribbean Junior Championships. He later won the gold medal at the 1979 Central American and Caribbean Championships, the bronze medal at the 1981 Central American and Caribbean Championships, the gold medal at the 1983 Central American and Caribbean Championships, the gold medal at the 1983 Ibero-American Championships and the bronze medal at the 1983 Pan American Games.

Alfaro finished third at both the British 1984 AAA Championships and the 1985 AAA Championships.

== International competitions ==
| Year | Competition | Venue | Position | Event | Notes |
Representing Cuba
| 1978 | Central American and Caribbean; Junior Championships (U17) | Xalapa, Mexico | 1st | Long jump | 6.60 m |
| 1978 | Central American and Caribbean; Junior Championships (U17) | Xalapa, Mexico | 2nd | Triple jump | 13.99 m |
| 1979 | Central American and Caribbean Championships | Guadalajara, Mexico | 1st | High jump | 2.25 m |
| 1981 | Central American and Caribbean Championships | Santo Domingo, Dominican Republic | 3rd | High jump | 2.18 m |
| 1981 | Universiade | Bucharest, Romania | 20th (q) | High jump | 2.08 m |
| 1983 | Central American and Caribbean Championships | Havana, Cuba | 1st | High jump | 2.25 m |
| 1983 | Universiade | Edmonton, Canada | 10th | High jump | 2.23 m |
| 1983 | Pan American Games | Caracas, Venezuela | 3rd | High jump | 2.25 m |
| 1983 | Ibero-American Championships | Barcelona, Spain | 1st | High jump | 2.20 m |
| 1984 | Friendship Games | Moscow, Soviet Union | 4th | High jump | 2.15 m |
