= Jalen Lott =

American football player

Oregon Ducks
- Position: Wide receiver
- Class: Freshman

Personal information
- Born: Phoenix, Arizona, U.S.
- Listed height: 6 ft 0 in (1.83 m)
- Listed weight: 176 lb (80 kg)

Career information
- High school: Panther Creek (Frisco, Texas)
- College: Oregon (2026–present)

Jalen Lott is an American college football wide receiver for the Oregon Ducks.

== Early life ==
Lott was born in Phoenix, Arizona and grew up in Chicago, later moving to Texas for athletic purposes. He attended Panther Creek High School in Frisco, Texas, where he played wide receiver and cornerback. As a junior, he had 85 receptions for 1,111 yards and 16 touchdowns and as a senior had 87 receptions for 1,276 yards and 20 touchdowns. A five-star recruit, Lott was rated among the best receivers in the 2026 class. He committed to the University of Oregon to play college football. He officially signed with Oregon on December 4, 2025. He also ran track in high school.

== Personal life ==
His father, James Lott, played in the Arena Football League.
