= Dariusz Zielke =

Polish high jumper

- Dariusz Zielke (2026)

Personal information
- Born: 21 October 1960 (age 66)
- Height: 1.91 m (6 ft 3 in)
- Weight: 73 kg (161 lb)

Sport
- Sport: Athletics
- Event: High jump
- Club: AZS Gdańsk

Dariusz Zielke (born 21 October 1960) is a Polish former athlete who specialised in the high jump. He won a bronze medal at the Friendship Games which were organised in 1984 for countries that boycotted the 1984 Summer Olympics.

His personal bests in the event are 2.31 metres outdoors (Warsaw 1984) and 2.28 metres indoors (Handen 1986).

His brother, Piotr Zielke, was also a high jumper.

== International competitions ==
Year	Competition	Venue	Position	Notes
Representintg Poland
1981	Universiade	Bucharest, Romania	7th	2.16 m
1982	European Indoor Championships	Milan, Italy	15th	2.19 m
1983	European Indoor Championships	Budapest, Hungary	8th	2.24 m
1984	Friendship Games	Moscow, Soviet Union	3rd	2.20 m
1985	European Indoor Championships	Piraeus, Greece	6th	2.24 m
1986	European Indoor Championships	Madrid, Spain	9th	2.24 m
1986	Goodwill Games	Moscow, Soviet Union	14th	2.15 m
1987	Universiade	Zagreb, Yugoslavia	15th	2.15 m
