= Panagiotis Kontaxakis =

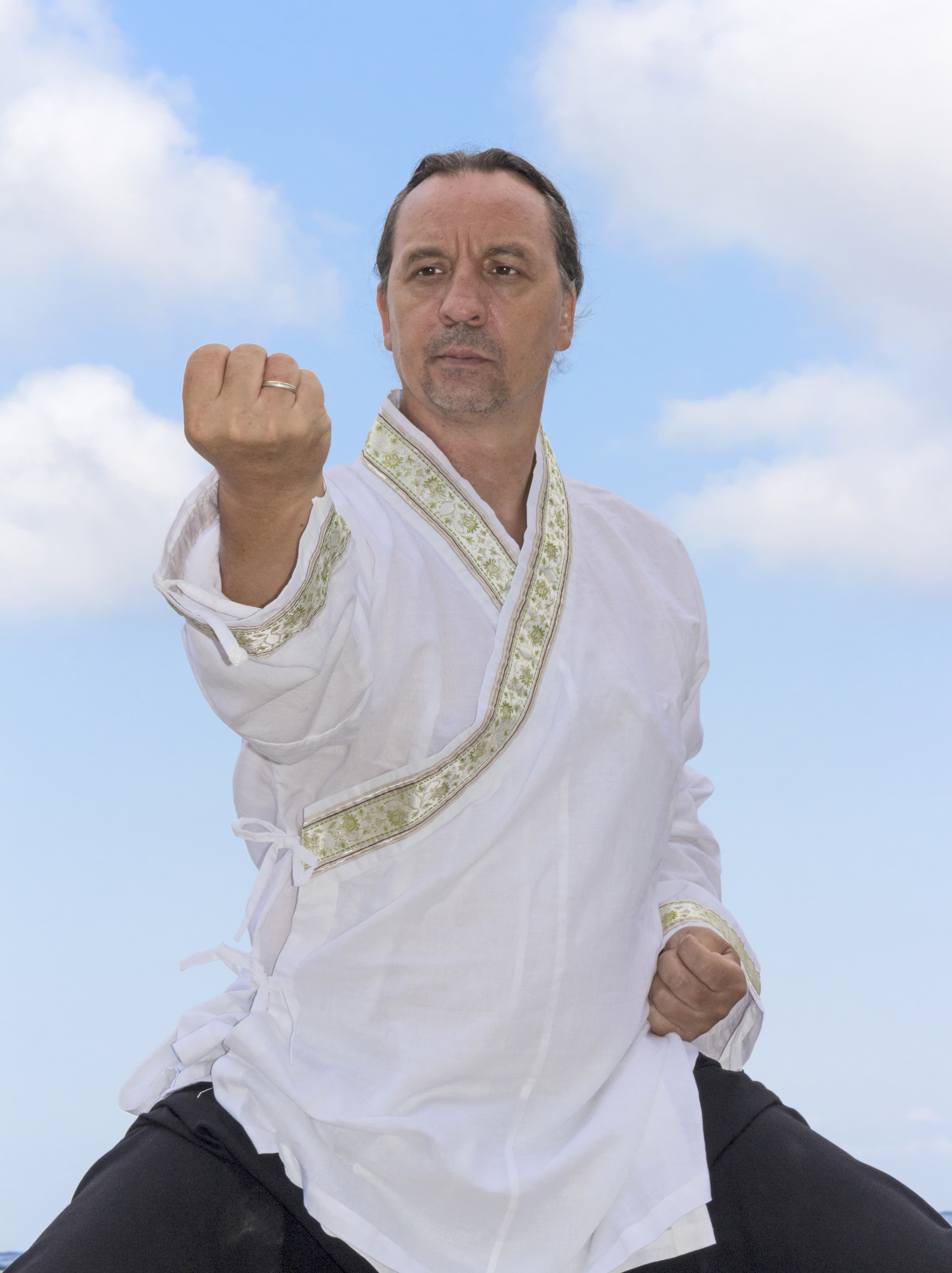
- Panagiotis Kontaxakis in Amorgos, 2015. The position is from the 7th exercise of Baduanjin (Clench the fists and glare fiercely)

Personal information
- Born: 16 August 1964 (age 61) Melbourne, Australia
- Home town: Athens, Greece

Sport
- Sport: Track and field Tai chi

Panagiotis Kontaxakis (Greek: Παναγιώτης Κονταξάκης; born 16 August 1964 in Melbourne, Australia) is a Greek qigong and tai chi master and a retired high jumper.

== High jumper career ==
He finished eighth at the 1989 European Indoor Championships.

His personal best jump was 2.28 metres (7 ft 6 in), achieved in July 1988 in Ankara and was repeated in May 1989 in Budapest. Thus he held the Greek national record, until 1992 when it was equaled by Kosmas Michalopoulos and bettered by Labros Papakostas.
