= Eddy Annys =

Belgian high jumper (born 1958)

Personal information
- Born: 13 December 1958 (age 67) Wilrijk, Antwerp Province, Belgium

Sport
- Sport: Track and field
Medal record
Representing Belgium
European Indoor Championships
Bronze medal – third place	1986 Madrid	High jump
Summer Universiade
Silver medal – second place	1983 Edmonton	High jump

Eddy Annys (born 13 December 1958) is a former high jumper from Belgium, who still remains the national record holder with 2.36 metres (outdoor) and 2.31 m (indoor).

Annys won a bronze medal at the 1986 European Athletics Indoor Championships. In 1983, he was named Belgian Sportsman of the Year. He is currently active at Randstad Belgium as the Managing Director.

== International competitions ==
Year	Competition	Venue	Position	Notes
Representing Belgium
1977	European Junior Championships	Vienna, Austria	6th	2.07 m
1978	European Championships	Prague, Czechoslovakia	16th	2.10 m
1979	European Indoor Championships	Vienna, Austria	15th	2.10 m
1981	Universiade	Bucharest, Romania	10th	2.18 m
1982	European Indoor Championships	Milan, Italy	17th	2.15 m
1983	Universiade	Edmonton, Canada	2nd	2.29 m
1983	World Championships	Helsinki, Finland	14th	2.19 m
1984	Olympic Games	Los Angeles, United States	15th (q)	2.21 m
1985	European Indoor Championships	Piraeus, Greece	4th	2.24 m
1986	European Indoor Championships	Madrid, Spain	3rd	2.28 m
