= James Lott =

American high jumper and football player (born 1965)

No. 9, 27
- Position: Defensive back

Personal information
- Born: October 13, 1965 (age 61); Refugio, Texas, U.S.
- Listed height: 6 ft 1 in (1.85 m)
- Listed weight: 195 lb (88 kg)

Career information
- High school: Refugio (TX)
- College: Texas

Career history
- Maryland Commandos (1989); Pittsburgh Gladiators (1990); Washington Commandos* (1990)
- * Offseason or practice squad member only

Awards and highlights
- NCAA Indoor High Jump Champion - (1986, 1987); NCAA Outdoor High Jump Champion - (1986); NCAA All-American Track and Field - (4x); SWC Indoor High Jump Champion - (1984, 1986, 1987); SWC Outdoor High Jump Champion - (1984, 1986, 1987); SWC Outdoor Track and Field Team Champion - (1986, 1987); SWC Football Champion - (1983)

Career AFL statistics
- Receptions: 3
- Yards: 25
- Tackles: 9
- Stats at ArenaFan.com

James Lott (born October 13, 1965) is an American former high jumper and football player. He won three NCAA championships won a gold medal at the 1987 World Summer Universiade Games and was an alternate on the 1988 U.S. Olympic Team. He also played pro football in the Arena Football League.

== Early life ==
In 1983, while competing for Refugio High School in Refugio, Texas, Lott set the National High school and World Junior Record in the high jump at 7' 4¾" improving on the 4-year-old record by Lee Balkin. The following year, Lott's record was improved upon by Dothel Edwards from Cedar Shoals High School in Athens, Georgia which lasted 25 years. Lott is still number 3 on the all-time list behind Edwards and the current record holder James White from Grandview High School in Grandview, Missouri. As of 2001, he still held the state record in the high jump at 7' 5 3/4".

He also was one of the state's top defensive backs at Refugio. He earned first-team all-state honors in 1982, was a PARADE All-American and was named to TEXAS FOOTBALL magazine’s All-Decade Team for the 1980s.

He was inducted into the Texas HS Football Hall of Fame in 1994, and into the Texas HS track and field Hall of Fame in 2025.

== College ==
James Lott went to the University of Texas at Austin where he was a two-sport star, competing in both Football as a Defensive Back and Track and Field as a high jumper.

He won the NCAA Championships in the high jump in the 1986 indoor, 1987 outdoor and 1987 indoor meets; and he helped the Longhorns to finish fifth at the 1986 NCAA Indoor Championship and 3rd in the 1986 Outdoor championship. He also won 6 SWC Indoor and outdoor titles at The University of Texas, where he was the first athlete to win an individual NCAA championship in track and field.

He finished tenth at the 1987 World Indoor Championships and won the gold medal at the 1987 World Summer Universiade Games.

His personal best jump was 2.34 metres which he achieved in May 1987 in Austin at the 1987 Texas Invitational.

Lott also enjoyed an extensive Football career at The University of Texas. He played for the 1983 team that won the Southwest Conference and lost to Georgia 109 in the Cotton Bowl after rising to the rank of #2. Lott started for the Longhorns in 1984 and 1985 at cornerback and helped them to the 1984 Freedom Bowl and 1985 Bluebonnet Bowl. He led the team in pass deflections in 1984.

He is a Member of the SWC All Decade Team and in 2017 he was inducted into the Longhorns Hall of Honor.

== Pro career ==
After college Lott competed in track professionally for the Nike Club. Lott placed fourth with a jump of 7'6" in the 1988 U.S. Olympic Trials, which secured an alternate position on the Olympic team. He continued into the early part of 1989.

In 1989 he returned to football. He played 1 game in the Arena Football League for the Maryland Commandos in the shortened season. In 1990 he played in 4 games for the Pittsburgh Gladiators before they traded him to the Washington Commandos for their wild card rights. But the Commandos never utilized him.

== Coaching career ==
Lott transitioned to coaching, starting his coaching career as the track and field and strength coach at Murray State in 1993. He then moved to Indiana University where he held the same jobs for 3 years. In 1996, he went to Trinity Valley Community College where he served as secondary and linebackers coach, speed and conditioning coach and academic liaison. He moved to Middle George College in 1998 where for one year he was the secondary coach, special team's coordinator, speed and conditioning coach and recruiting coordinator. From 1999 to 2001 he was the secondary coach and recruiting coordinator at Midwestern State. From 2001 to 2003 he was the secondary coach and recruiting coordinator at Texas A&M-Kingsville.

He went on to become a coach and scout in Frisco, Texas.

He is married to Fey Meeks Lott, who played college basketball at Texas and his daughter Jasmyn Lott plays basketball at UNLV. Another daughter, Falyn Lott, is on the USC track team. His son Jalen is a high school football and track star, who won a gold medal in the long jump as a junior. Jalen was ranked the #2 athlete in the state for the class of 2025 who, despite being recruited by Texas, committed to Oregon in July 2025.
