= Ján Zvara =

Czechoslovak high jumper

Ján Zvara (born 12 February 1963 in Banská Bystrica) is a retired Slovak high jumper who represented Czechoslovakia. His greatest achievement was the bronze medal at the 1987 IAAF World Indoor Championships. His personal best was 2.36 metres, achieved in August 1987 in Prague.

== International competitions ==
| Year | Competition | Venue | Position | Notes |
Representing Czechoslovakia
| 1985 | World Indoor Games | Paris, France | 6th | 2.21 m |
| 1985 | European Indoor Championships | Piraeus, Greece | 7th | 2.20 m |
| 1986 | European Indoor Championships | Madrid, Spain | 8th | 2.24 m |
| 1986 | Goodwill Games | Moscow, Soviet Union | 5th | 2.29 m |
| 1986 | European Championships | Stuttgart, West Germany | 9th | 2.21 m |
| 1987 | European Indoor Championships | Liévin, France | 4th | 2.33 m |
| 1987 | World Indoor Championships | Indianapolis, United States | 3rd | 2.34 m |
| 1987 | World Championships | Rome, Italy | 7th | 2.32 m |
