= Hennadiy Avdyeyenko =

Ukrainian high jumper

Olympic medal record

Men's athletics

Representing Soviet Union

Olympic Games
Gold medal – first place	1988 Seoul	High jump

World Championships
Gold medal – first place	1983 Helsinki	High jump
Silver medal – second place	1987 Rome	High jump

World Indoor Championships
Silver medal – second place	1987 Indianapolis	High jump

European Indoor Championships
Bronze medal – third place	1987 Lievin	High jump

Hennadiy Valentynovych Avdyeyenko (Ukrainian: Геннадій Валентинович Авдєєнко) (born November 4, 1963, in Odessa) is a retired high jumper who represented the USSR and later Ukraine. He trained at the Armed Forces sports society in Odessa under the guidance of Borys Robulets. He won gold medals at both the Olympics and the World Championships.

== Career ==
Avdyeyenko entered the 1983 World Championships as an unknown. His personal best was only 2.25 m and he had placed 6th at the main tryout meeting, the 1983 Spartakiad; however, high jump coach Kęstutis Šapka and team coach Igor Ter-Ovanesyan lobbied to have him included in the team. In the World Championship final, up against thirteen athletes with bests of 2.30 m or better, Avdyeyenko improved his personal best by 7 centimetres to win an unexpected gold medal, beating the United States' Tyke Peacock on countback.

Avdyeyenko placed second at the 1987 World Indoor Championships in Indianapolis, jumping a new personal best (and Soviet indoor record) of 2.38 m but losing to teammate Igor Paklin in a jump-off. He won another silver medal at the outdoor championships that year, again jumping 2.38 m and tying with Paklin; this time the tie did not have to be broken, as Patrik Sjöberg won on countback and the gold medal was thus not at stake.

Avdyeyenko then won another gold at the 1988 Summer Olympics in Seoul, in the absence of Cuba's world record holder Javier Sotomayor, whose country boycotted the Olympics. He jumped 2.38 m yet again, and this time he was the only jumper to clear that height.

Avdyeyenko graduated from Odessa Polytechnic Institute and worked as an expert in refrigerating equipment.

== Major achievements ==
Year	Tournament	Venue	Result	Extra
1983	World Championships	Helsinki, Finland	1st	2.32 PB
1987	European Indoor Championships	Liévin, France	3rd	
1987	World Indoor Championships	Indianapolis, United States	2nd	
1987	World Championships	Rome, Italy	2nd	2.38 PB
1988	Summer Olympics	Seoul, South Korea	1st	2.38 equal PB
