= Gerd Wessig =

East German high jumper

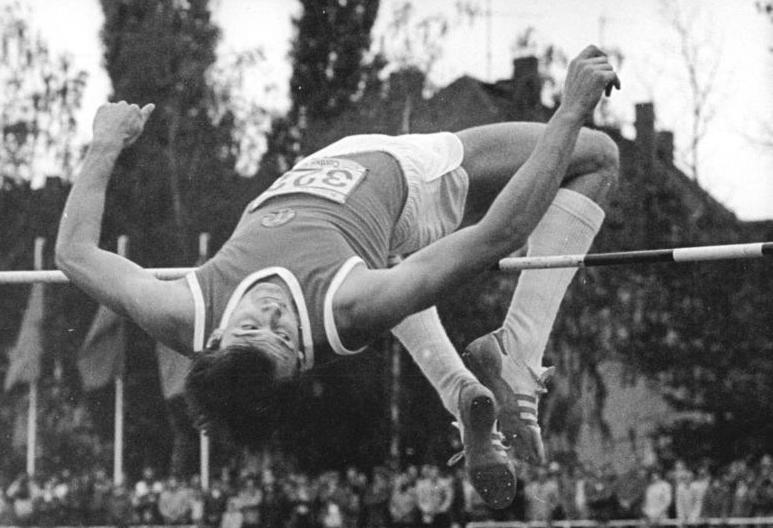

Medal record

Men's athletics

Representing East Germany

Olympic Games
Gold medal – first place	1980 Moscow	High jump

Gerd Wessig (German pronunciation: [ɡɛʁt ˈvɛsɪç], audio; born 16 July 1959 in Lübz, Mecklenburg-Vorpommern) is a former East German high jumper who won the gold medal in the 1980 Summer Olympics, the first man ever to set a world record in the high jump at the Olympics.

== Early life ==
Wessig, a professional chef, trained with the SC Traktor Schwerin under trainer Bernd Jahn. He attended the John Brinckmann School in Goldberg.

Wessig was 2.01 metres tall and, while he was competing, weighed 88 kilograms (6' 7", 194 lbs). Shortly before the 1980 Olympics, he surprisingly became East German champion, setting a new personal best result of 2.30 metres and was subsequently nominated for the East German Olympic team.

== 1980 Olympics ==
At the 1980 Olympic Games in Moscow, the 21-year-old was thus amongst the mild favourites, but the heavy favorite was the defending champion, Jacek Wszoła, of Poland: at the 1976 Olympics in Montreal, Wszola had established a new Olympic record of 2.25 metres. Early in the 1980 outdoor season, Wszola set a new world record of 2.35 on Sunday 25 May (in Eberstadt, Germany), and this mark was tied the next day by 18-year-old West German Dietmar Mögenburg, at a competition in Rehlingen, Germany. Because of the western nations' boycott of the Moscow Olympics, Mögenburg did not compete. Of the 16 finalists in the men's high jump (all having qualified with jumps of 2.21 on 31 July), thirteen used the Fosbury flop style, and three used the classic straddle.

Wessig not only out-dueled Wszoła for the gold during the finals on 1 August, the two shattered the 1976 mark several times, with clearances at 2.27, 2.29, and 2.31. Wessig began the competition at 2.15, and was flawless until 2.29, when he needed two attempts. That proved to be the decisive height: of the 7 men who cleared the then-new Olympic record of 2.27, only 4 managed to scale 2.29. Those four, the Polish champion versus the entire East German team of Wessig, 18-year-old sensation Jörg Freimuth, and 22-year-old Henry Lauterbach, would now battle for the medals. With the other three men having all cleared 2.29 on their first attempts, Wessig's first miss at that height dropped him to fourth place, out of the medals. But, he leaped back into first place, all alone, with his first attempt clearance of 2.31.

Wessig then out-jumped Wszoła at 2.33 to secure the gold medal. Wessig cleared on his second attempt, with Wszoła just barely brushing the bar off on the third and final attempt. Wessig continued to jump, alone, setting a new world record with his jump of 2.36 metres. He set the new record on his second attempt, with a sensational clearance. Wessig, having taken 11 jumps during the competition through 2.36, then took three attempts at 2.38. He thereby became the first high jumper who had managed to improve on the men's high jump world record at the Olympic Games. The previous world record holder, Wszoła, won the silver medal. Wessig's effort in Moscow was the acme of his career; his world record would stand for three years, and the Olympic record would not be broken until the 1988 games in Seoul.

== Later life ==
After the Olympic Games, Wessig tried his luck as a decathlete (best performance: 8015 points, 23 May 1983 in Neubrandenburg; the equivalent of 7974 points according to the scale introduced in 1985). He turned back to the high jump following frequent injuries. In 1985, he came in second at the World Cup. In 1986, he reached seventh place at the European Championships. He became East German champion again 1988 and 1989.

Since the end of his active athletics career, he has been running an enterprise in Lübstorf-Rugensee, Mecklenburg-Vorpommern which sells sport equipment, sport and leisure systems, as well as park and garden systems. He married the long jumper Christine Schima (best performance: 6.96 metres, 1984; seventh place at the 1982 European Championships).

Records
Preceded by (West Germany) Dietmar Mögenburg	Men's High Jump World Record Holder; 1 August 1980 – 11 June 1983	Succeeded by (China) Zhu Jianhua
Sporting positions
Preceded by (West Germany) Dietmar Mögenburg	Men's High Jump Best Year Performance; 1980	Succeeded by (Soviet Union) Oleksiy Demyanyuk
