= Gianni Davito =

Italian high jumper (born 1957)

Personal information
- Nationality: Italian
- Born: 19 August 1957 (age 68) Biella, Italy

Sport
- Country: Italy
- Sport: Athletics
- Event: High jump

Achievements and titles
- Personal best: High jump: 2.27 m (1983)

Gianni Davito (born 19 August 1957) is a retired Italian high jumper.

== Biography ==
He finished eighth at the 1977 European Indoor Championships. He also competed at the 1983 World Championships without reaching the final.

His personal best jump is 2.27 metres, achieved in July 1983 in Rome.

== Achievements ==
| Year | Competition | Venue | Position | Event | Performance | Notes |
|---|---|---|---|---|---|---|
| 1983 | World Championships | (Finland) Helsinki | Qual. | High jump | 2.10 m | |

== National titles ==
Gianni Davito has won 6 times the individual national championship.

- 2 wins in High jump (1983, 1986)
- 4 wins in High jump indoor (1984, 1986, 1990, 1991)
