= Clarence Saunders (athlete) =

Bermudian high jumper (born 1963)

Personal information
- Born: 14 September 1963 (age 62) Paget Parish, Bermuda

Sport
- Sport: Track and field
Medal record
Representing Bermuda
Summer Universiade
Bronze medal – third place	1983 Edmonton	High jump
Commonwealth Games
Gold medal – first place	1990 Auckland	High jump
Bronze medal – third place	1982 Brisbane	High jump
Central American and Caribbean Games
Bronze medal – third place	1982 Havana	High jump

Clarence Nicholas Saunders (born 14 September 1963) is a retired Bermudian high jumper.

He won a bronze medal at the 1982 Commonwealth Games and finished fifth at the 1988 Summer Olympics. Competing for the Boston University Terriers track and field program, Saunders won the 1984 high jump at the NCAA Division I Indoor Track and Field Championships with a mark of 2.27 metres.

In 1989 he held the Commonwealth record with 2.34 metres, but this was equalled by Dalton Grant. At the 1990 Commonwealth Games in Auckland, Saunders would jump 2.36 to take the Commonwealth record and the gold medal ahead of Grant. 2.36 metres remained Saunders' career best jump, and it is still a Bermudian record. Dalton Grant would later improve his personal best to 2.36 metres (2.37 metres indoor). He also still holds the national record for the 400 metres hurdles, set in 1994.

== International competition record ==
Year	Competition	Venue	Position	Event	Notes
Representing Bermuda
1980	CARIFTA Games (U-20)	Hamilton, Bermuda	2nd	High jump	2.05 m
1981	CARIFTA Games (U-20)	Nassau, Bahamas	7th	100 m	10.9
1981	CARIFTA Games (U-20)	Nassau, Bahamas	1st	High jump	2.18 m
1981	CARIFTA Games (U-20)	Nassau, Bahamas	4th	Triple jump	15.04 m
1982	CARIFTA Games (U-20)	Kingston, Jamaica	2nd	200 m	22.0
1982	CARIFTA Games (U-20)	Kingston, Jamaica	1st	High jump	2.13 m
1982	Central American and Caribbean; Junior Championships (U-20)	Bridgetown, Barbados	6th	200 m	21.69
1982	Central American and Caribbean; Junior Championships (U-20)	Bridgetown, Barbados	2nd	High jump	1.98 m
1982	Central American and Caribbean; Junior Championships (U-20)	Bridgetown, Barbados	8th	Long jump	6.83 m
1982	Central American and Caribbean Games	Havana, Cuba	3rd	High jump	2.17 m
1982	Commonwealth Games	Brisbane, Australia	3rd	High jump	2.19 m
1983	Universiade	Edmonton, Canada	3rd	High jump	2.26 m
1983	World Championships	Helsinki, Finland	23rd (q)	High jump	2.15 m
1984	Olympic Games	Los Angeles, United States	21st (q)	High jump	2.18 m
1985	Universiade	Kobe, Japan	(q)	High jump	2.20 m^{1}
1987	Pan American Games	Indianapolis, United States	5th	High jump	2.20 m
1987	World Championships	Rome, Italy	5th	High jump	2.32 m
1988	Olympic Games	Seoul, South Korea	5th	High jump	2.34 m
1989	World Indoor Championships	Budapest, Hungary	14th	High jump	2.20 m
1990	Commonwealth Games	Auckland, New Zealand	1st	High jump	2.36 m GR
1992	Olympic Games	Barcelona, Spain	—	High jump	NM

Notes:
- Results with a (q) indicate overall position in qualifying round.
- Saunders no heighted (NH) in the qualifying round at the 1992 Olympic Games, failing three times at his opening height of 2.15 m.
^{1}No mark in the final
