= Mirosław Włodarczyk =

Polish high jumper (born 1959)

Personal information
- Born: 24 February 1959 (age 67) Kraków, Poland

Sport
- Sport: Track and field
Medal record
Representing Poland
European Indoor Championships
Bronze medal – third place	1983 Budapest	High jump

Mirosław Włodarczyk (born 24 February 1959) is a Polish retired high jumper.

He won the bronze medal at the 1983 European Indoor Championships, and finished in joint fifth place at the 1984 European Indoor Championships,

His personal best jump was 2.26 metres, achieved in June 1983 in Kraków. He had 2.27 metres on the indoor track, achieved at the 1983 European Indoor Championships.
