= Oleksiy Demyanyuk =

Soviet high jumper

Personal information
- Born: July 30, 1958 Baranivka, Ukrainian SSR
- Died: April 5, 1999 (aged 40) Zakarpattia Oblast, Ukraine

Sport
- Sport: Track and field

Oleksiy Demyanyuk (July 30, 1958 – April 5, 1999) was a high jumper from the Soviet Union, who set the world's best year performance in 1981 with a leap of 2.33 metres at a meet in Leningrad. He ended up in eleventh place at the 1980 Summer Olympics in Moscow.

His son, Dmytro Dem'yanyuk, is also a high jumper.

Sporting positions
Preceded by (East Germany) Gerd Wessig	Men's High Jump Best Year Performance; 1981	Succeeded by (China) Zhu Jianhua
