= Rudolf Povarnitsyn =

Ukrainian high jumper (born 1962)

Personal information
- Born: 13 June 1962 (age 64) Votkinsk, Udmurtia, Soviet Union

Sport
- Sport: Track and field
Medal record
Representing Soviet Union
Olympic Games
| Bronze medal – third place | 1988 Seoul | High jump |
Summer Universiade
| Bronze medal – third place | 1989 Duisburg | High jump |

Rudolf Pavlovich Povarnitsyn (Russian: Рудольф Павлович Поварницын; born 13 June 1962) is a Soviet and Ukrainian high jumper. He represented the Soviet Union and Ukraine.

== Career ==
Competing in the high jump, his achievement was a bronze medal at the 1988 Summer Olympics for the USSR. His personal best jump of 2.40 metres, set in Donetsk, was also the world record from 11 August to 4 September 1985, when Igor Paklin beat it by one centimetre. Povarnitsyn's record is unique in that his personal best preceding his record setting competition was 2.26 m.

Records
| Preceded by (China) Zhu Jianhua | Men's High Jump World Record Holder; 1985-08-11 – 1985-09-04 | Succeeded by (Soviet Union) Igor Paklin |
