= Francisco Centelles =

Cuban high jumper (1961–2025)

Personal information
- Nationality: Cuban
- Born: January 26, 1961 Playa, Ciudad de la Habana, Cuba
- Died: November 19, 2025 (aged 64)
- Height: 196 cm (6 ft 5 in)
- Weight: 81 kg (179 lb)

Sport
- Sport: Athletics
- Event: High jump
Medal record
Representing Cuba
Central American and Caribbean Games
Gold medal – first place	1982 Havana	High jump
Gold medal – first place	1986 Santiago	High jump
Pan American Games
Gold medal – first place	1983 Caracas	High jump
Summer Universiade
Silver medal – second place	1985 Kobe	High jump

Juan Francisco Centelles Aizpurúa (January 26, 1961 – November 19, 2025) was a Cuban high jumper, who competed at the 1980 Summer Olympics.

Centelles won the British AAA Championships title in the high jump event at the 1984 AAA Championships.

Centelles died on November 19, 2025, at the age of 64.

== Achievements ==
Year	Competition	Venue	Position	Event	Notes
Representing Cuba
1981	Central American and Caribbean Championships	Santo Domingo, Dominican Republic	1st	High jump	2.22 m
1982	Central American and Caribbean Games	Havana, Cuba	1st	High jump	2.25 m
1983	Pan American Games	Caracas, Venezuela	1st	High jump	2.29 m
1983	World Championships	Helsinki, Finland	15th	High jump	2.19 m
1985	Central American and Caribbean Championships	Nassau, Bahamas	2nd	High jump	2.30 m
1986	Central American and Caribbean Games	Santiago, Dominican Republic	1st	High jump	2.22 m
1987	Central American and Caribbean Championships	Caracas, Venezuela	2nd	High jump	2.20 m

== Sources ==
- 1983 Year Ranking
- Francisco Centelles at World Athletics
- Francisco Centelles at Olympedia
- Francisco Centelles at InterSportStats
