= Kosmas Mikhalopoulos =

Greek high jumper

Personal information
- Nationality: Greek
- Born: 6 March 1966 (age 60) Kastoria, Greece

Sport
- Sport: Athletics
- Event: High jump

Kosmas Mikhalopoulos (born 6 March 1966) is a Greek athlete. He competed in the men's high jump at the 1992 Summer Olympics.
