= Patrik Sjöberg =

Swedish high jumper

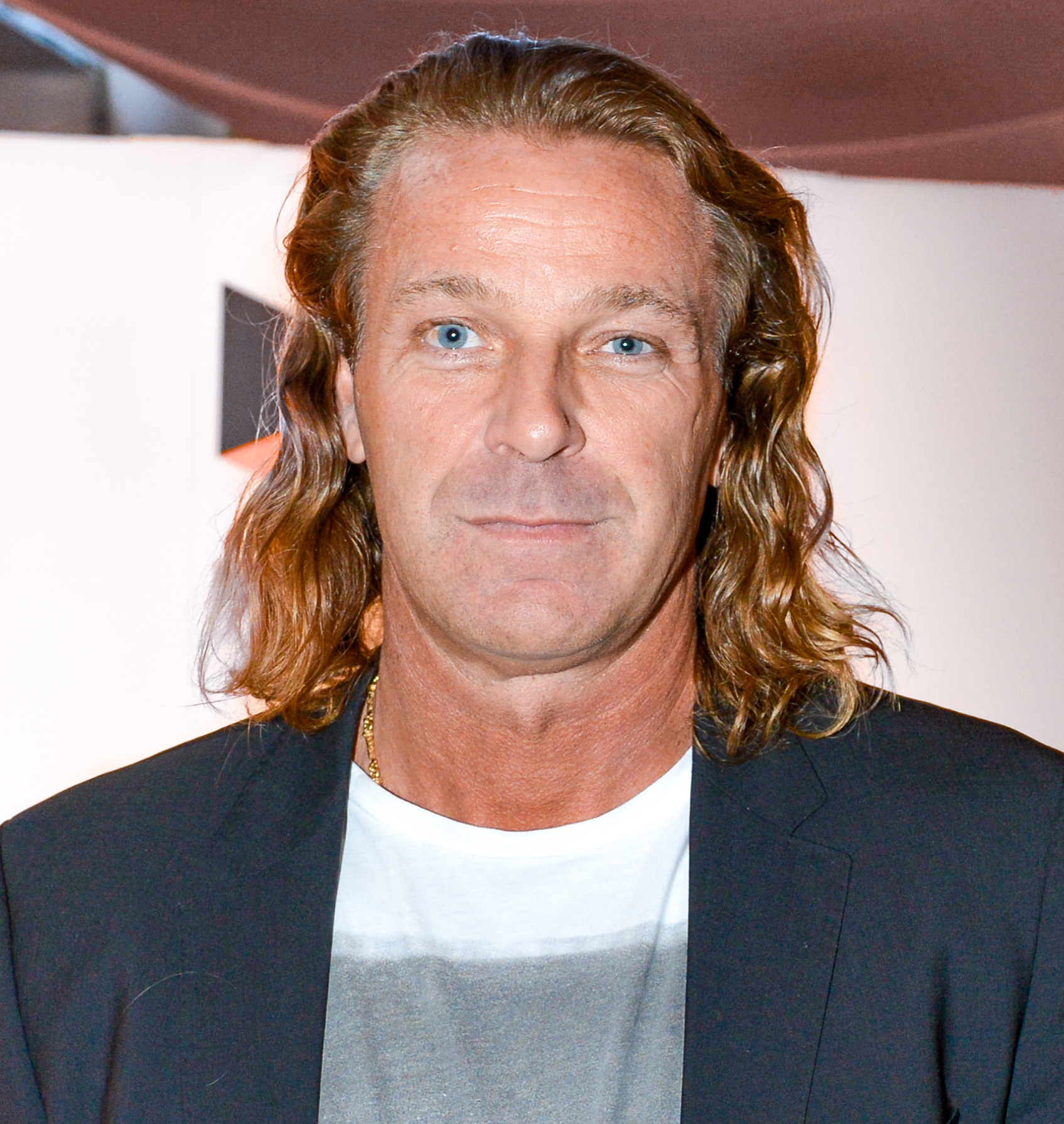
- Patrik Sjöberg 2013

Personal information
- Full name: Jan Niklas Patrik Sjöberg
- Born: 5 January 1965 (age 61) Gothenburg, Sweden
- Height: 2.00 m (6 ft 7 in)
- Weight: 84 kg (185 lb)

Sport
- Country: Sweden
- Club: Örgryte IS
- Retired: 1999

Achievements and titles
- Personal bests: 2.42 m 2.41 m (indoors)
Medal record
Men's Athletics
Olympic Games
Silver medal – second place	1984 Los Angeles	High jump
Silver medal – second place	1992 Barcelona	High jump
Bronze medal – third place	1988 Seoul	High jump
World Championships
Gold medal – first place	1987 Rome	High jump
World Indoor Championships
Gold medal – first place	1985 Paris	High jump
Silver medal – second place	1993 Toronto	High jump
Bronze medal – third place	1989 Budapest	High jump
European Indoor Championships
Gold medal – first place	1985 Athens	High jump
Gold medal – first place	1987 Lievin	High jump
Gold medal – first place	1988 Budapest	High jump
Gold medal – first place	1992 Genoa	High jump

Jan Niklas Patrik Sjöberg (Swedish pronunciation: [ˈpɑ̌ːtrɪk ˈɧø̂ːbærj]; born 5 January 1965) is a Swedish former high jumper. He broke the world record with 2.42 m (7 ft 11 1/4 in) in Stockholm on 30 June 1987. This mark is still the European record and ranks him third on the world all-time list behind Javier Sotomayor and Mutaz Essa Barshim. He is also a former two-time world indoor record holder with marks of 2.38 m (1985) and 2.41 m (1987). He is the 1987 World Champion and a three-time Olympic medallist.

== Early life ==
Sjöberg was born in Gothenburg, Västra Götaland, and was a member of the Örgryte IS club.

== Career ==
Sjöberg has a gold medal from the World Championships in Rome 1987 and has three Olympic medals: silver medals from Los Angeles 1984 and Barcelona 1992, and a bronze medal from Seoul 1988. Sjöberg is the only high jumper to have won medals in more than two Olympic Games. He won the 1985 World Indoor Games, is a four-time European Indoor champion and twice won the World Cup title.

Sjöberg received the Svenska Dagbladet Gold Medal in 1985. He has inspired many later Swedish high jumpers, most notably Kajsa Bergqvist, Linus Thörnblad, Staffan Strand, and Stefan Holm. His world record of 2.42 m was broken 15 months later, when, on the eve of the Seoul Summer Olympics, Javier Sotomayor jumped 2.43 m in September 1988 at a meet in Spain.

Sjöberg competed as a celebrity dancer in Let's Dance 2014, finishing fourth.

Sjöberg, who is a survivor of child sexual abuse, is co-founder of the website Dumpen.se, a website that exposes pedophiles and discusses issues relating to child grooming and sexual abuse.

== Personal life ==
In his 2011 autobiography, Sjöberg revealed that he had been sexually molested as a child by his coach Viljo Nousiainen, a prominent Swedish athletics coach.

He has a daughter, Isabelle.

== Competition record ==
Year	Competition	Venue	Position	Notes
Representing Sweden
1981	European Junior Championships	Utrecht, Netherlands	8th	2.16 m
1982	European Indoor Championships	Milan, Italy	10th	2.22 m
1983	European Indoor Championships	Budapest, Hungary	–	NM
1983	European Junior Championships	Schwechat, Austria	3rd	2.21 m
1983	World Championships	Helsinki, Finland	11th	2.23 m
1984	European Indoor Championships	Gothenburg, Sweden	7th	2.24 m
1984	Olympic Games	Los Angeles, United States	2nd	2.33 m
1985	World Indoor Games	Paris, France	1st	2.32 m
1985	European Indoor Championships	Piraeus, Greece	1st	2.35 m
1985	World Cup	Canberra, Australia	1st	2.31 m^{1}
1986	European Indoor Championships	Madrid, Spain	6th	2.24 m
1986	European Championships	Stuttgart, West Germany	6th	2.25 m
1987	European Indoor Championships	Liévin, France	1st	2.38 m
1987	World Indoor Championships	Indianapolis, United States	1st (q)	2.24 m^{2}
1987	World Championships	Rome, Italy	1st	2.38 m
1988	European Indoor Championships	Budapest, Hungary	1st	2.39 m
1988	Olympic Games	Seoul, South Korea	3rd	2.36 m
1989	World Indoor Championships	Budapest, Hungary	3rd	2.35 m
1989	World Cup	Barcelona, Spain	1st	2.34 m^{1}
1991	World Indoor Championships	Seville, Spain	13th	2.24 m
1991	World Championships	Tokyo, Japan	7th	2.31 m
1992	European Indoor Championships	Genoa, Italy	1st	2.38 m
1992	Olympic Games	Barcelona, Spain	2nd	2.34 m
1993	World Indoor Championships	Toronto, Canada	2nd	2.39 m
1995	World Championships	Gothenburg, Sweden	6th	2.32 m

^{1}Representing Europe
^{2}No mark in the final

Records
Preceded by (Soviet Union) Igor Paklin	Men's High Jump World Record Holder; 30 June 1987 – 8 September 1988	Succeeded by (Cuba) Javier Sotomayor
Preceded by (Soviet Union) Igor Paklin	Men's High Jump European Record Holder; 30 June 1987– (shared with (Ukraine) Bohdan Bondarenko from 14 June 2014)	Succeeded by Incumbent
Awards
Preceded by Gunde Svan	Svenska Dagbladet Gold Medal; 1985	Succeeded by Tomas Johansson
Sporting positions
Preceded by (Soviet Union) Igor Paklin	Men's High Jump Best Year Performance; 1987	Succeeded by (Cuba) Javier Sotomayor
Preceded by (United States) Hollis Conway (i) (Cuba) Javier Sotomayor (United States) Charles Austin	Men's High Jump Best Year Performance; 1992 (i)	Succeeded by (Cuba) Javier Sotomayor
