= Cai Shu (athlete) =

Chinese high jumper

Personal information
- Born: June 14, 1962 (age 64) Jiexi, Guangdong Province, China

Sport
- Sport: Track and field
Medal record
Representing China
Asian Games
Silver medal – second place	1982 New Delhi	High jump

Cai Shu (Chinese: 蔡舒; pinyin: Cài Shū; born June 14, 1962) is a retired Chinese male high jumper who competed at the 1984 Summer Olympics.

== Achievements ==
Year	Competition	Venue	Position	Notes
1982	Asian Games	New Delhi, India	2nd	2.22 m
1984	Olympic Games	Los Angeles, United States	8th	2.27 m
