= Zhu Jianhua =

Chinese high jumper (born 1963)

Personal information
- Native name: 朱建华
- Born: 29 May 1963 (age 63) Shanghai
- Height: 1.93 m (6 ft 4 in)
- Weight: 70 kg (154 lb)

Sport
- Event: High jump

Achievements and titles
- Personal best: 2.39 m
Medal record
Men's athletics
Representing China
Olympic Games
Bronze medal – third place	1984 Los Angeles	High Jump
World Championships
Bronze medal – third place	1983 Helsinki	High jump
Asian Championships
Gold medal – first place	1981 Tokyo	High jump
Gold medal – first place	1983 Kuwait City	High jump
Summer Universiade
Silver medal – second place	1981 Bucharest	High jump

Zhu Jianhua (simplified Chinese: 朱建华; traditional Chinese: 朱建華; pinyin: Zhū Jiànhuá; born 29 May 1963) is a retired Chinese high jumper. His personal best of 2.39 metres is a former world record for the event, and is still the Chinese record.

In Helsinki 1983, Zhu became China's first man to win a medal in the IAAF World Championships. In the 1984 Los Angeles Olympics, he became the first male from the People's Republic of China to win an athletics medal in the history of the Olympic Games (Yang Chuan-kwang won a silver medal representing the Republic of China in the 1960 Rome Olympics). He is a two-time gold medallist at both the Asian Games and the Asian Athletics Championships.

== Career ==
Dominating Asian high jumping in the early 1980s, Zhu won the Asian Championships in 1981, crushing the championship record by 15 centimetres. He repeated this at the 1982 Asian Games with a jump of 2.33 m, beating the previous games record by 12 cm. He retained his title in the 1986 Asian Games.

At the inaugural World Championships in 1983 and the 1984 Summer Olympics, he competed against the world elite, finishing third on both occasions. Zhu's Olympic performance brought anger as well as pride back home in China – those disappointed he had not won gold smashed the windows of their homes.

On June 11, 1983, Zhu jumped 2.37 m, setting a new world record. He would go on to reach 2.38 and even 2.39 m, the latter on June 10, 1984. Prior to the 1984 Olympics, Zhu cleared eight feet in practice, becoming unofficially the first man to clear this height. The world record stood until August 11, 1985, when Rudolf Povarnitsyn beat it by one centimetre. His 2.39 m jump in 1984 was the oldest Asian record in athletics across all Olympic events and lasted until 2013, when Mutaz Essa Barshim from Qatar jumped 2.40 m.

Zhu's indoor best of 2.31 m stood as the Chinese indoor record from 1986 until 2012, when Zhang Guowei jumped a centimetre higher.

== Achievements ==
Year	Competition	Venue	Position	Event	Notes
Representing China
1981	Asian Championships	Tokyo, Japan	1st	High jump	2.30 CR
1982	Asian Games	New Delhi, India	1st	High jump	2.34 CR
1983	World Championships	Helsinki, Finland	3rd	High jump	2.29
1983	Asian Championships	Kuwait City, Kuwait	1st	High jump	2.31 CR
1984	Olympic Games	Los Angeles, U.S.	3rd	High jump	2.31
1986	Asian Games	Seoul, South Korea	1st	High jump	2.31
1988	Olympic Games	Seoul, South Korea	20th	High jump	

== See also ==
- China at the World Championships in Athletics

Records
Preceded by (East Germany) Gerd Wessig	Men's High Jump World Record Holder; 1983-06-11 – 1985-08-11	Succeeded by (Soviet Union) Rudolf Povarnitsyn
Sporting positions
Preceded by (Soviet Union) Oleksiy Demyanyuk	Men's High Jump Best Year Performance; 1982 – 1984	Succeeded by (Soviet Union) Igor Paklin
