= Moussa Sagna Fall =

Senegalese high jumper

Personal information
- Born: 31 December 1959 (age 66)

Sport
- Sport: Track and field
Medal record
Representing Senegal
African Championships
Gold medal – first place	1982 Cairo	High jump
Gold medal – first place	1985 Cairo	High jump
Bronze medal – third place	1979 Dakar	High jump

Moussa Sagna Fall (born 31 December 1959) is a retired Senegalese high jumper.

Regionally, he won a bronze medal at the 1979 African Championships, and then gold at the 1982 and 1985 African Championships. He also competed at the 1980 Olympic Games and the 1983 World Championships without reaching the final.

His personal best jump of 2.26 metres (1982) is the Senegalese record.
