= Leo Williams (athlete) =

American high jumper and entrepreneur

Personal information
- Nationality: American
- Born: 28 April 1960 (age 66) Muncie, Indiana, United States

Sport
- Sport: Athletics
- Event: High jump
Medal record
Representing United States
Pan American Games
Silver medal – second place	1983 Caracas	High jump
Summer Universiade
Gold medal – first place	1981 Bucharest	High jump

Leo W. Williams II (born 28 April 1960) is an American retired high jumper and entrepreneur.

== Biography ==
While attending Annapolis, Williams won four indoor Army-Navy Championships, four outdoor Army-Navy Championships, four indoor Heptagonal Championships, four outdoor Heptagonal Championships (1980–83) and the 1983 Penn Relays Championship of America High Jump (2.26 meters). He won the gold medal at the 1981 Summer Universiade with a jump of 2.24 meters and the silver medal at the 1983 Pan American Games with a jump of 2.27 meters. He is a two-time NCAA Indoor Champion (1981 with a jump of 2.27 meters and 1982 with a jump of 2.28 meters).

He won the 1981 NCAA Championship with a jump of 2.25 meters. He also competed at the 1983 World Championships placing 12th in the final with a jump of 2.23 meters. He was the alternate on the 1984 US Olympic Team after placing 4th at the 1984 US Olympic Trials with a jump of 2.28 meters. Williams won the 1991 US Olympic Festival Championship with a jump of 2.27 meters. Williams is also a six-time US Interservice High Jump Champion (1983–1989) and the 1986 Conseil International du Sport Militaire (CISM) with a jump of 2.20 meters.

Williams' personal best jump is 2.29 metres, achieved in June 1982 in Provo, Utah. Williams won the British AAA Championships title at the 1983 AAA Championships.

Williams graduated and competed for the US Naval Academy and Muncie Burris High School (IN) and led his track teams to numerous conference championships and invitational successes, though no one can recall Leo actually running more than 50 meters - EVER. While attending Muncie Burris, he won the Tom DeWitt-Shelby Smith Academic Excellence Award combining athletic and advanced mathematics success. While attending the US Naval Academy, Williams won the Thompson Trophy and the NAAA Sword. These are the highest two athletic awards given at the US Naval Academy. Williams graduated from the US Naval Academy with a degree in Mathematics - Operations Analysis. He served six years as a naval officer in the Civil Engineer Corps. Williams now is the president and CEO of a Microbial Disinfection Company (CSGI) that he co-founded in Los Angeles, California.
