= Alain Metellus =

Canadian athlete

Personal information
- Nationality: Canadian
- Born: April 8, 1965 (age 61) New York City, New York, U.S.

Sport
- Sport: Athletics
- Event: High jump
Medal record
Men's athletics
Representing Canada
Commonwealth Games
Bronze medal – third place	1986 Edinburgh	High jump

Alain Metellus (born April 8, 1965) is an American-born Canadian athlete. He competed in the men's high jump at the 1984 Summer Olympics. Metellus is of Haitian descent.
