= Novica Čanović =

Serbian high jumper

Personal information
- Born: 29 November 1961 Kumanovo, Yugoslavia
- Died: 3 July 1993 (aged 31) Knin, Croatia

Sport
- Sport: Track and field
Medal record
Representing Yugoslavia
Mediterranean Games
Gold medal – first place	1987 Latakia	High jump

Novica Čanović (Serbian Cyrillic: Новица Чановић; 29 November 1961 – 3 July 1993) was a Serbian high jumper who represented SFR Yugoslavia during his active career.

== Biography ==
Čanović was born in Kumanovo in today's North Macedonia. He finished fifteenth at the 1983 European Indoor Championships and won the gold medal at the 1987 Mediterranean Games. He also competed at the 1984 Olympic Games without reaching the final.

Čanović became Yugoslavian high jump champion in 1982, 1983, 1984, 1986 and 1987, rivalling with Danial Temim, Hrvoje Fižuleto and Sašo Apostolovski. He also became indoor champion in 1987.

He still holds the high jump record in Croatia (senior 228, junior 218 cm and indoor senior 228 cm) as he competed for Croatian AC Slavonija Osijek. His personal best jump was 2.28 metres, achieved in July 1985 in Split.

He died in July 1993 in Knin as a soldier of the Army of the Republic of Serbian Krajina.
