= Igor Paklin =

Kyrgyz high jumper (born 1963)

Personal information
- Born: 15 June 1963 (age 63) Frunze, Kirghiz SSR, Soviet Union

Sport
- Sport: Track and field
Medal record
Representing Soviet Union
World Athletics Championships
Silver medal – second place	1987 Rome	High jump
World Indoor Championships
Gold medal – first place	1987 Indianapolis	High jump
European Championships
Gold medal – first place	1986 Stuttgart	High jump
Summer Universiade
Gold medal – first place	1983 Edmonton	High jump
Gold medal – first place	1985 Kobe	High jump

Igor Vasilyevich Paklin (Russian: Игорь Васильевич Паклин; born 15 June 1963) is a retired Soviet Kyrgyz athlete who represented USSR and later Kyrgyzstan. He trained at Armed Forces sports society in Frunze.

Competing in the high jump, he won the 1987 World Indoor Championships as well as a silver medal at the 1987 World Championships for the USSR. His personal best jump of 2.41 metres (7.9 feet) was also the world record from 4 September 1985 to 30 June 1987, when Patrik Sjöberg beat it by one centimetre. His leap of 2.41 m (7 ft 11 in) places him as the fifth-highest jumper in history. Like all modern high jumpers, Paklin used the Fosbury Flop style, and he was the first to do so jumping off his right leg.

In 1995, he was imprisoned for manslaughter.

== International competitions ==
Year	Competition	Venue	Position	Notes
Representing Soviet Union
1981	European Junior Championships	Utrecht, Netherlands	4th	2.19 m
1983	Universiade	Edmonton, Canada	1st	2.31 m
1983	World Championships	Helsinki, Finland	4th	2.29 m
1984	European Indoor Championships	Gothenburg, Sweden	8th	2.20 m
1985	Universiade	Kobe, Japan	1st	2.41 m
1986	European Championships	Stuttgart, West Germany	1st	2.34 m
1987	World Indoor Championships	Indianapolis, United States	1st	2.38 m
1987	Universiade	Zagreb, Yugoslavia	9th	2.24 m
1987	World Championships	Rome, Italy	2nd	2.38 m
1988	Olympic Games	Seoul, South Korea	7th	2.31 m
1989	Universiade	Duisburg, West Germany	6th	2.20 m
1991	World Championships	Tokyo, Japan	10th	2.24 m
Representing Unified Team
1992	Olympic Games	Barcelona, Spain	22nd (q)	2.20 m
Representing Kyrgyzstan
1993	World Indoor Championships	Toronto, Canada	DNS	–
1993	World Championships	Stuttgart, Germany	30th (q)	2.15 m
1994	Asian Games	Hiroshima, Japan	6th	2.15 m
1999	Central Asian Games	Bishkek, Kyrgyzstan	2nd	2.19 m
(q) Indicates overall position in qualifying round

Records
Preceded by (Soviet Union) Rudolf Povarnitsyn	Men's High Jump World Record Holder; 1985-09-04 – 1987-06-30	Succeeded by (Sweden) Patrik Sjöberg
Sporting positions
Preceded by (China) Zhu Jianhua	Men's High Jump Best Year Performance; 1985 – 1986	Succeeded by (Sweden) Patrik Sjöberg
