= List of Spanish Athletics Championships winners =

The Spanish Athletics Championships (Spanish: Campeonato de España de atletismo) is an annual toutdoor track and field competition organised by the Royal Spanish Athletics Federation (RFEA), which serves as the Spanish national championship for the sport. It is typically held as a two-day event in the Spanish summer around late June to early August. The venue of the championships is decided on an annual basis. The winners have exclusively been Spanish nationals.

The competition was first held in 1917 as a men's only competition. A separate women's began in 1931 but, following the onset of the Spanish Civil War, this was cancelled after 1935 and it was not until 1963 that women events were added alongside the men's programme.

== Men ==
=== 100 metres ===
- 1960: Melanio Asensio
- 1961: Armando Roca
- 1962: Melanio Asensio
- 1963: José Luis Sánchez Paraíso
- 1964: José Luis Sánchez Paraíso
- 1965: José Luis Sánchez Paraíso
- 1966: José Luis Sánchez Paraíso
- 1967: Ramón Magariños
- 1968: Ramón Magariños
- 1969: Ramón Magariños
- 1970: Juan Carlos Jones
- 1971: José Luis Sánchez Paraíso
- 1972: José Luis Sánchez Paraíso
- 1973: José Luis Sánchez Paraíso
- 1974: José Luis Sarriá
- 1975: Josep Carbonell
- 1976: Javier Martínez
- 1977: Ángel Ibáñez
- 1978: José Luis Sarriá
- 1979: José Luis Sánchez Paraíso
- 1980: Javier Martínez
- 1981: Josep Carbonell
- 1982: Javier Martínez
- 1983: Juan José Prado
- 1984: José Javier Arqués
- 1985: José Javier Arqués
- 1986: José Javier Arqués
- 1987: José Javier Arqués
- 1988: José Javier Arqués
- 1989: José Javier Arqués
- 1990: Enrique Talavera
- 1991: Enrique Talavera
- 1992: Sergio López
- 1993: Enrique Talavera
- 1994: Pedro Pablo Nolet
- 1995: Francisco Javier Navarro
- 1996: Venancio José
- 1997: Frutos Feo
- 1998: Frutos Feo
- 1999: Pedro Pablo Nolet
- 2000: Venancio José
- 2001: Diego Moisés Santos
- 2002: Orkatz Beitia
- 2003: Orkatz Beitia
- 2004: Iván Mocholi
- 2005: Orkatz Beitia
- 2006: Ángel David Rodríguez

=== 200 metres ===
- 1960: Melanio Asensio
- 1961: Armando Roca
- 1962: José Luis Sánchez Paraíso
- 1963: Francisco Suárez
- 1964: José Luis Sánchez Paraíso
- 1965: José Luis Sánchez Paraíso
- 1966: José Luis Sánchez Paraíso
- 1967: Miguel Iraundegui
- 1968: Ramón Magariños
- 1969: Ramón Magariños
- 1970: José Luis Sarriá
- 1971: José Luis Sarriá
- 1972: José Luis Sarriá
- 1973: José Luis Sarriá
- 1974: José Luis Sarriá
- 1975: Miguel Arnau
- 1976: José Luis Sarriá
- 1977: José Luis Sarriá
- 1978: José Luis Sarriá
- 1979: Ángel Heras
- 1980: Juan José Prado
- 1981: Javier Martínez
- 1982: Ángel Heras
- 1983: Antonio Sánchez
- 1984: Antonio Sánchez
- 1985: Juan José Prado
- 1986: Antonio Sánchez
- 1987: Antonio Sánchez
- 1988: Cayetano Cornet
- 1989: Miguel Gómez
- 1990: Luis Rodríguez
- 1991: Enrique Talavera
- 1992: Miguel Gómez
- 1993: Jordi Mayoral
- 1994: Frutos Feo
- 1995: Jordi Mayoral
- 1996: Jordi Mayoral
- 1997: Jordi Mayoral
- 1998: Francisco Javier Navarro
- 1999: Jordi Mayoral
- 2000: Jordi Mayoral
- 2001: Adrián Fernández
- 2002: Julián Martínez
- 2003: Jordi Mayoral
- 2004: Ángel David Rodríguez
- 2005: David Canal
- 2006: Josué Mena

=== 400 metres ===
- 1960: Virgilio González Barbeitos
- 1961: Virgilio González Barbeitos
- 1962: Ramón Pérez
- 1963: Pablo Cano
- 1964: Pedro Arteaga
- 1965: Rogelio Rivas
- 1966: Ramón Magariños
- 1967: Rogelio Rivas
- 1968: Manuel Gayoso
- 1969: Manuel Gayoso
- 1970: Rogelio Rivas
- 1971: Alfonso Gabernet
- 1972: Alfonso Gabernet
- 1973: Héctor Hermida
- 1974: José López Perís
- 1975: José López Perís
- 1976: José López Perís
- 1977: Jenaro Iritia
- 1978: Jenaro Iritia
- 1979: Isidoro Hornillos
- 1980: Benjamín González
- 1981: Benjamín González
- 1982: Benjamín González
- 1983: Ángel Heras
- 1984: Juan José Prado
- 1985: Ángel Heras
- 1986: Ángel Heras
- 1987: Ángel Heras
- 1988: Ángel Heras
- 1989: Cayetano Cornet
- 1990: José Luis Palacios
- 1991: Cayetano Cornet
- 1992: Cayetano Cornet
- 1993: Cayetano Cornet
- 1994: Cayetano Cornet
- 1995: Pablo Escrivá
- 1996: Antonio Andrés
- 1997: Antonio Andrés
- 1998: David Canal
- 1999: David Canal
- 2000: David Canal
- 2001: David Canal
- 2002: David Canal
- 2003: David Canal
- 2004: David Testa
- 2005: Antonio Manuel Reina
- 2006: David Testa

=== 800 metres ===
- 1960: Tomás Barris
- 1961: Tomás Barris
- 1962: Tomás Barris
- 1963: Tomás Barris
- 1964: Alberto Estebán
- 1965: Alberto Estebán
- 1966: Alberto Estebán
- 1967: Virgilio González Barbeitos
- 1968: Enrique Bondía
- 1969: Teodoro Barrio
- 1970: Juan Borraz
- 1971: Francisco Morera
- 1972: Antonio Fernández Ortiz
- 1973: Isidro Solórzano
- 1974: Antonio Fernández Ortiz
- 1975: Andreu Ballbé Garcia
- 1976: Andreu Ballbé Garcia
- 1977: Andreu Ballbé Garcia
- 1978: Antonio Páez
- 1979: Colomán Trabado
- 1980: Colomán Trabado
- 1981: Colomán Trabado
- 1982: Colomán Trabado
- 1983: Andrés Vera
- 1984: Colomán Trabado
- 1985: Colomán Trabado
- 1986: Colomán Trabado
- 1987: Colomán Trabado
- 1988: Colomán Trabado
- 1989: Tomás de Teresa
- 1990: Luis Javier González
- 1991: Luis Javier González
- 1992: Luis Javier González
- 1993: Luis Javier González
- 1994: Tomás de Teresa
- 1995: Tomás de Teresa
- 1996: Alejandro Miguel
- 1997: José Manuel Cerezo
- 1998: Roberto Parra
- 1999: Eugenio Barrios
- 2000: Roberto Parra
- 2001: Antonio Manuel Reina
- 2002: Antonio Manuel Reina
- 2003: Antonio Manuel Reina
- 2004: Antonio Manuel Reina
- 2005: Antonio Manuel Reina
- 2006: Juan de Dios Jurado

=== 1500 metres ===
- 1960: Julio Gómez
- 1961: Tomás Barris
- 1962: Tomás Barris
- 1963: Tomás Barris
- 1964: Tomás Barris
- 1965: Fernando Aguilar
- 1966: José María Morera
- 1967: José María Morera
- 1968: José María Alonso
- 1969: José María Morera
- 1970: Antonio Burgos
- 1971: Antonio Burgos
- 1972: Rafael García
- 1973: Francisco Morera
- 1974: Antonio Burgos
- 1975: Estanislao Durán
- 1976: José Luis González
- 1977: Jaime López de Egea
- 1978: José Manuel Abascal
- 1979: José Luis González
- 1980: José Luis González
- 1981: José Manuel Abascal
- 1982: José Manuel Abascal
- 1983: Colomán Trabado
- 1984: José Manuel Abascal
- 1985: José Manuel Abascal
- 1986: José Luis González
- 1987: Andrés Vera
- 1988: Santiago Villalonga
- 1989: Fermín Cacho
- 1990: Fermín Cacho
- 1991: Fermín Cacho
- 1992: Fermín Cacho
- 1993: Fermín Cacho
- 1994: Isaac Viciosa
- 1995: Fermín Cacho
- 1996: Fermín Cacho
- 1997: Reyes Estévez
- 1998: Reyes Estévez
- 1999: Andrés Manuel Díaz
- 2000: Juan Carlos Higuero
- 2001: José Antonio Redolat
- 2002: Juan Carlos Higuero
- 2003: Juan Carlos Higuero
- 2004: Reyes Estévez
- 2005: Arturo Casado
- 2006: Juan Carlos Higuero

=== 5000 metres ===
- 1960: José Molíns
- 1961: Manuel Augusto Alonso
- 1962: Mariano Haro
- 1963: Fernando Aguilar
- 1964: Mariano Haro
- 1965: Mariano Haro
- 1966: Javier Álvarez
- 1967: Javier Álvarez
- 1968: Javier Álvarez
- 1969: Mariano Haro
- 1970: Mariano Haro
- 1971: Ramón Tasende
- 1972: Javier Álvarez
- 1973: Javier Álvarez
- 1974: Fernando Cerrada
- 1975: Fernando Cerrada
- 1976: José Luis Ruiz
- 1977: Fernando Cerrada
- 1978: Fernando Cerrada
- 1979: Fernando Cerrada
- 1980: Antonio Prieto
- 1981: Antonio Prieto
- 1982: Antonio Campos
- 1983: Luis Adsuara
- 1984: José Manuel Albentosa
- 1985: José Manuel Albentosa
- 1986: Pere Arco
- 1987: Jaime López de Egea
- 1988: Juan Carlos Paúl
- 1989: José Luis Carreira
- 1990: José Luis González
- 1991: Abel Antón
- 1992: Abel Antón
- 1993: Abel Antón
- 1994: Anacleto Jiménez
- 1995: Enrique Molina
- 1996: Anacleto Jiménez
- 1997: Manuel Pancorbo
- 1998: Manuel Pancorbo
- 1999: Isaac Viciosa
- 2000: Yousef El Nasri
- 2001: Alberto García
- 2002: Alberto García
- 2003: Jesús España
- 2004: Carles Castillejo
- 2005: Jesús España
- 2006: Jesús España

=== 10,000 metres ===
- 1960: Carlos Pérez
- 1961: José Molíns
- 1962: Mariano Haro
- 1963: Fernando Aguilar
- 1964: Mariano Haro
- 1965: Mariano Haro
- 1966: Francisco Aritmendi
- 1967: Fernando Aguilar
- 1968: Carlos Pérez
- 1969: Mariano Haro
- 1970: Mariano Haro
- 1971: Mariano Haro
- 1972: Agustín Fernández
- 1973: Mariano Haro
- 1974: Mariano Haro
- 1975: Mariano Haro
- 1976: Fernando Fernández Gaytán
- 1977: Fernando Cerrada
- 1978: Fernando Cerrada
- 1979: Fernando Cerrada
- 1980: Antonio Prieto
- 1981: Fernando Cerrada
- 1982: Antonio Prieto
- 1983: Antonio Prieto
- 1984: Antonio Prieto
- 1985: Luis Adsuara
- 1986: Santiago Llorente
- 1987: José Manuel Albentosa
- 1988: Juan Rosario
- 1989: Alejandro Gómez
- 1990: Carlos de la Torre
- 1991: Alejandro Gómez
- 1992: Antonio Prieto
- 1993: Alejandro Gómez
- 1994: Abel Antón
- 1995: Alejandro Gómez
- 1996: Alejandro Gómez
- 1997: Julio Rey
- 1998: Bruno Toledo
- 1999: Teodoro Cuñado
- 2000: José Ríos
- 2001: José Ríos
- 2002: José Ríos
- 2003: José Ríos
- 2004: José Manuel Martínez
- 2005: José Manuel Martínez
- 2006: Juan Carlos de la Ossa

=== Half marathon ===
- 1992: Alejandro Gómez
- 1993: Alberto Juzdado
- 1994: Francisco Javier Cortés
- 1995: Fabián Roncero
- 1996: José Manuel García
- 1997: Bartolomé Serrano
- 1998: Francisco Javier Cortés
- 1999: Javier Caballero
- 2000: Antoni Peña
- 2001: Antoni Peña
- 2002: Ramiro Morán
- 2003: Alejandro Gómez
- 2004: Julio Rey
- 2005: Antoni Peña

=== 30K run ===
- 1966: Carlos Pérez
- 1967: Juan Hidalgo
- 1968: Carlos Pérez
- 1969: Carlos Pérez
- 1970: Juan Hidalgo
- 1971: Javier Álvarez
- 1972: Javier Álvarez
- 1973: Juan Hidalgo
- 1974: Santiago Manguán
- 1975: Mariano Haro
- 1976: Juan Hidalgo
- 1977: Fernando Fernández Gaytán
- 1978: Fernando Fernández Gaytán
- 1979: José Luis Ruiz
- 1980: Abel Perau
- 1981: Vicente Polo
- 1982: Santiago de la Parte
- 1983: Roberto García
- 1984: Juan Barón
- 1985: Santiago de la Parte
- 1986: Ramiro Matamoros
- 1987: Honorato Hernández
- 1988: José Esteban Montiel
- 1989: Víctor Urrea
- 1990: Rodrigo Gavela
- 1991: Antoni Peña

=== Marathon ===
The Spanish Marathon Championships was held on a short course in 1960 (40.123 km), 1963 (41.5 km), and 1969 (40.7 km), but the winner remained valid.

- 1960: Jaime Guixá
- 1961: Miguel Navarro
- 1962: Jaime Guixá
- 1963: Francisco Guardia
- 1964: Miguel Navarro
- 1965: Rufino Galán
- 1966: Carlos Pérez
- 1967: Carlos Pérez
- 1968: Carlos Pérez
- 1969: Carlos Pérez
- 1970: Carlos Pérez
- 1971: Juan Hidalgo
- 1972: Santiago Manguán
- 1973: Luis Landa
- 1974: Juan Hidalgo
- 1975: Agustín Fernández
- 1976: José Aparacio
- 1977: Santiago Manguán
- 1978: Antonio Romero
- 1979: Eleuterio Antón
- 1980: Eleuterio Antón
- 1981: Eleuterio Antón
- 1982: Santiago de la Parte
- 1983: Juan Carlos Traspaderne
- 1984: Eleuterio Antón
- 1985: Alfonso Abellán
- 1986: Santiago de la Parte
- 1987: Vicente Antón
- 1988: Alfonso Abellán
- 1989: Emiliano García
- 1990: Vicente Antón
- 1991: Jesús de Grado
- 1992: Rodrigo Gavela
- 1993: Ricardo Castaño
- 1994: José Apalanza
- 1995: Ricardo Castaño
- 1996: Rodrigo Gavela
- 1997: Antoni Peña
- 1998: Juan Antonio Ruiz
- 1999: José María González
- 2000: Benito Ojeda
- 2001: Benito Ojeda
- 2002: Not held
- 2003: Not held
- 2004: Not held
- 2005: Roger Roca

=== 100K run ===
- 1985: Domingo Catalán
- 1986: Domingo Catalán
- 1987: Domingo Catalán
- 1988: Domingo Catalán
- 1989: Ángel Lage
- 1990: Domingo Catalán
- 1991: Miguel Blanco
- 1992: Domingo Catalán
- 1993: Manuel Murillo
- 1994: Manuel Murillo
- 1995: Manuel Murillo
- 1996: Manuel Murillo
- 1997: Jesús Corredor
- 1998: Juan Rodríguez
- 1999: Juan Rodríguez
- 2000: Ramón Álvarez
- 2001: Jorge Aubeso
- 2002: Jorge Aubeso
- 2003: Jorge Aubeso
- 2004: Jorge Aubeso
- 2005: Jorge Aubeso

=== 3000 metres steeplechase ===
- 1960: Manuel Augusto Alonso
- 1961: Manuel Augusto Alonso
- 1962: Manuel Augusto Alonso
- 1963: José Jesús Fernández
- 1964: Manuel Augusto Alonso
- 1965: Javier Álvarez
- 1966: Javier Álvarez
- 1967: Mariano Haro
- 1968: Félix Lluch
- 1969: Vicente Egido
- 1970: Antonio Frechilla
- 1971: Vicente Egido
- 1972: Julio Gude
- 1973: Vicente Egido
- 1974: Antonio Campos
- 1975: Antonio Campos
- 1976: Ricardo Ortega
- 1977: Antonio Campos
- 1978: Antonio Campos
- 1979: Antonio Campos
- 1980: Domingo Ramón
- 1981: Domingo Ramón
- 1982: Domingo Ramón
- 1983: Juan José Torres
- 1984: Domingo Ramón
- 1985: Jorge Bello
- 1986: Francisco Sánchez
- 1987: Francisco Sánchez
- 1988: Jon Azkueta
- 1989: Benito Nogales
- 1990: Benito Nogales
- 1991: Benito Nogales
- 1992: Jon Azkueta
- 1993: Antonio Peula
- 1994: Antonio Peula
- 1995: Pau Bundo
- 1996: Elisardo de la Torre
- 1997: Ramiro Morán
- 1998: Ramiro Morán
- 1999: Eliseo Martín
- 2000: Luis Miguel Martín
- 2001: Antonio David Jiménez
- 2002: Antonio David Jiménez
- 2003: Eliseo Martín
- 2004: Antonio David Jiménez
- 2005: Antonio David Jiménez
- 2006: Antonio David Jiménez

=== 110 metres hurdles ===
- 1960: Carlos Viladeval
- 1961: Manuel Ufer
- 1962: Francisco Campra
- 1963: Manuel Ufer
- 1964: Manuel Ufer
- 1965: Manuel Ufer
- 1966: Rafael Cano
- 1967: Rafael Cano
- 1968: Manuel Ufer
- 1969: Rafael Cano
- 1970: Rafael Cano
- 1971: Gerardo Trianes
- 1972: Gerardo Trianes
- 1973: Gerardo Calleja
- 1974: Juan Lloveras
- 1975: Juan Lloveras
- 1976: Juan Lloveras
- 1977: Juan Lloveras
- 1978: Javier Moracho
- 1979: Ángel Horcajada
- 1980: Javier Moracho
- 1981: Javier Moracho
- 1982: Javier Moracho
- 1983: Javier Moracho
- 1984: Javier Moracho
- 1985: Javier Moracho
- 1986: Carlos Sala
- 1987: Javier Moracho
- 1988: Carlos Sala
- 1989: Carlos Sala
- 1990: Carlos Sala
- 1991: Carlos Sala
- 1992: Carlos Sala
- 1993: Carlos Sala
- 1994: Antonio Lanau
- 1995: Antonio Lanau
- 1996: Jesús Font
- 1997: Jesús Font
- 1998: Francisco Javier López
- 1999: Francisco Javier López
- 2000: Francisco Javier López
- 2001: Felipe Vivancos
- 2002: Felipe Vivancos
- 2003: Felipe Vivancos
- 2004: Felipe Vivancos
- 2005: Felipe Vivancos
- 2006: Jackson Quiñónez

=== 400 metres hurdles ===
- 1960: Francisco Javier Sáinz
- 1961: Francisco Javier Sáinz
- 1962: Francisco Javier Sáinz
- 1963: José Girbau
- 1964: Manuel Gayoso
- 1965: Manuel Gayoso
- 1966: Manuel Gayoso
- 1967: Pedro Carda
- 1968: Manuel Gayoso
- 1969: Francisco Suárez
- 1970: Francisco Suárez
- 1971: Francisco Suárez
- 1972: Manuel Soriano
- 1973: Manuel Soriano
- 1974: Ramón Ávila
- 1975: Marceliano Ruiz
- 1976: Ángel Horcajada
- 1977: José Alonso
- 1978: José Alonso
- 1979: José Casabona
- 1980: José Alonso
- 1981: Marceliano Ruiz
- 1982: Marceliano Ruiz
- 1983: Carlos Azulay
- 1984: José Alonso
- 1985: José Alonso
- 1986: José Alonso
- 1987: José Alonso
- 1988: José Alonso
- 1989: José Alonso
- 1990: José Alonso
- 1991: Santiago Fraga
- 1992: Santiago Fraga
- 1993: Santiago Fraga
- 1994: Iñigo Monreal
- 1995: Javier Pitillas
- 1996: Iñigo Monreal
- 1997: Alberto González
- 1998: Iñigo Monreal
- 1999: Juan Herrero
- 2000: Eduardo Iván Rodríguez
- 2001: Eduardo Iván Rodríguez
- 2002: Eduardo Iván Rodríguez
- 2003: Eduardo Iván Rodríguez
- 2004: Eduardo Iván Rodríguez
- 2005: Eduardo Iván Rodríguez
- 2006: Eduardo Iván Rodríguez

=== High jump ===
- 1960: José López Aguado
- 1961: Juan Ignacio Ariño
- 1962: Juan Ignacio Ariño
- 1963: Juan Ignacio Ariño
- 1964: Luis María Garriga
- 1965: Luis María Garriga
- 1966: Rafael Cano
- 1967: Luis María Garriga
- 1968: Luis María Garriga
- 1969: Luis María Garriga
- 1970: José Martín
- 1971: Luis María Garriga
- 1972: Gustavo Marqueta
- 1973: Martín Perarnau
- 1974: Martín Perarnau
- 1975: Francisco Martín
- 1976: Juan Carrasco
- 1977: Roberto Cabrejas
- 1978: Roberto Cabrejas
- 1979: Francisco Martín
- 1980: Roberto Cabrejas
- 1981: Miguel Ángel Moral
- 1982: Roberto Cabrejas
- 1983: Miguel Ángel Moral
- 1984: Roberto Cabrejas
- 1985: Gustavo Adolfo Becker
- 1986: Gustavo Adolfo Becker
- 1987: Arturo Ortiz
- 1988: Arturo Ortiz
- 1989: Gustavo Adolfo Becker
- 1990: Arturo Ortiz
- 1991: Arturo Ortiz
- 1992: Arturo Ortiz
- 1993: Arturo Ortiz
- 1994: Gustavo Adolfo Becker
- 1995: Arturo Ortiz
- 1996: Arturo Ortiz
- 1997: Arturo Ortiz
- 1998: Ignacio Pérez
- 1999: Javier Villalobos
- 2000: David Antona
- 2001: Javier Villalobos
- 2002: Ignacio Pérez
- 2003: Javier Bermejo
- 2004: Javier Bermejo
- 2005: Javier Bermejo
- 2006: David Antona

=== Pole vault ===
- 1960: Felipe Armengol
- 1961: Felipe Armengol
- 1962: Miguel Cosegal
- 1963: Miguel Cosegal
- 1964: Miguel Cosegal
- 1965: Ignacio Sola
- 1966: Ignacio Sola
- 1967: Ignacio Sola
- 1968: Ignacio Sola
- 1969: Ignacio Sola
- 1970: Miguel Cosegal
- 1971: Ignacio Sola
- 1972: Ignacio Sola
- 1973: José Hernández
- 1974: Roger Oriol
- 1975: Efrén Alonso
- 1976: Efrén Alonso
- 1977: Roger Oriol
- 1978: Efrén Alonso
- 1979: Roger Oriol
- 1980: Roger Oriol
- 1981: Alberto Ruiz
- 1982: Alberto Ruiz
- 1983: Alberto Ruiz
- 1984: Alberto Ruiz
- 1985: Alberto Ruiz
- 1986: Alberto Ruiz
- 1987: Jorge Corella
- 1988: Alberto Ruiz
- 1989: Javier García
- 1990: Javier García
- 1991: Françesc Mas
- 1992: Javier García
- 1993: Daniel Martí
- 1994: Isaac Molinero
- 1995: Javier García
- 1996: José Manuel Arcos
- 1997: Isaac Molinero
- 1998: Montxu Miranda
- 1999: Montxu Miranda
- 2000: Montxu Miranda
- 2001: Javier Gazol
- 2002: Montxu Miranda
- 2003: Montxu Miranda
- 2004: Javier Gazol
- 2005: Javier Gazol
- 2006: Luis Moro

=== Long jump ===
- 1960: Luis Felipe Areta
- 1961: José María Isasa
- 1962: Luis Felipe Areta
- 1963: Ignacio Martínez de Osaba
- 1964: Jacinto Segura
- 1965: Ignacio Martínez de Osaba
- 1966: Jacinto Segura
- 1967: Luis Felipe Areta
- 1968: Jacinto Segura
- 1969: Rafael Blanquer
- 1970: Rafael Blanquer
- 1971: Luis Felipe Areta
- 1972: Juan Azpeitia
- 1973: Rafael Blanquer
- 1974: Rafael Blanquer
- 1975: Rafael Blanquer
- 1976: Rafael Blanquer
- 1977: Rafael Blanquer
- 1978: Rafael Blanquer
- 1979: Alberto Solanas
- 1980: Antonio Corgos
- 1981: Alberto Solanas
- 1982: Antonio Corgos
- 1983: Antonio Corgos
- 1984: Antonio Corgos
- 1985: Antonio Corgos
- 1986: Antonio Corgos
- 1987: Antonio Corgos
- 1988: Antonio Corgos
- 1989: Ángel Hernández
- 1990: Ángel Hernández
- 1991: Jesús Oliván
- 1992: Antonio Corgos
- 1993: Ángel Hernández
- 1994: Ángel Hernández
- 1995: Jesús Oliván
- 1996: Jesús Oliván
- 1997: Florentino Galaviz
- 1998: Yago Lamela
- 1999: Yago Lamela
- 2000: Yago Lamela
- 2001: Antonio Adsuar
- 2002: Raúl Fernández
- 2003: Yago Lamela
- 2004: Alberto Sanz
- 2005: Joan Lino Martínez
- 2006: Alberto Sanz

=== Triple jump ===
- 1960: Luis Felipe Areta
- 1961: Luis Felipe Areta
- 1962: Luis Felipe Areta
- 1963: Domingo Cornudella
- 1964: Luis Felipe Areta
- 1965: Jesús Verde
- 1966: Jaime Rubias
- 1967: Luis Felipe Areta
- 1968: Luis Felipe Areta
- 1969: César Suárez de Centí
- 1970: Luis Felipe Areta
- 1971: Luis Felipe Areta
- 1972: Jesús Bartolomé
- 1973: Ramón Cid
- 1974: Alberto Santamaría
- 1975: Ramón Cid
- 1976: Ramón Cid
- 1977: Alberto Santamaría
- 1978: Ramón Cid
- 1979: Ramón Cid
- 1980: Ramón Cid
- 1981: Ramón Cid
- 1982: Ramón Cid
- 1983: Juan Ambrosio González
- 1984: Juan Ambrosio González
- 1985: Juan Ambrosio González
- 1986: Alberto Solanas
- 1987: Alberto Solanas
- 1988: Santiago Moreno
- 1989: Mario Quintero
- 1990: Santiago Moreno
- 1991: Santiago Moreno
- 1992: Santiago Moreno
- 1993: Raúl Chapado
- 1994: Julio López
- 1995: Julio López
- 1996: Raúl Chapado
- 1997: Raúl Chapado
- 1998: Raúl Chapado
- 1999: Raúl Chapado
- 2000: Raúl Chapado
- 2001: Raúl Chapado
- 2002: Raúl Chapado
- 2003: Raúl Chapado
- 2004: Eduardo Pérez
- 2005: Pere Joseph
- 2006: Eduardo Pérez

=== Shot put ===
- 1960: Alfonso Vidal-Quadras
- 1961: Antonio Lamua
- 1962: Alfonso Vidal-Quadras
- 1963: Alberto Díaz
- 1964: Alberto Díaz
- 1965: Alberto Díaz
- 1966: Alberto Díaz
- 1967: Miguel Unanue
- 1968: Miguel Unanue
- 1969: Antonio Herrería
- 1970: Antonio Herrería
- 1971: Antonio Herrería
- 1972: Antonio Herrería
- 1973: Manuel Ruiz Parajón
- 1974: Manuel Ruiz Parajón
- 1975: Juan Briceño
- 1976: Juan Briceño
- 1977: Juan Briceño
- 1978: Francisco Martín
- 1979: Martín Vara
- 1980: Martín Vara
- 1981: Martín Vara
- 1982: Martín Vara
- 1983: Martín Vara
- 1984: Martín Vara
- 1985: Martín Vara
- 1986: Martín Vara
- 1987: Martín Vara
- 1988: Matías Jiménez
- 1989: Matías Jiménez
- 1990: José Luis Martínez
- 1991: Víctor Roca
- 1992: José Luis Martínez
- 1993: Manuel Martínez Gutiérrez
- 1994: Manuel Martínez Gutiérrez
- 1995: Manuel Martínez Gutiérrez
- 1996: Manuel Martínez Gutiérrez
- 1997: Manuel Martínez Gutiérrez
- 1998: Manuel Martínez Gutiérrez
- 1999: José Luis Martínez
- 2000: Manuel Martínez Gutiérrez
- 2001: Manuel Martínez Gutiérrez
- 2002: Manuel Martínez Gutiérrez
- 2003: Manuel Martínez Gutiérrez
- 2004: Manuel Martínez Gutiérrez
- 2005: Manuel Martínez Gutiérrez
- 2006: Manuel Martínez Gutiérrez

=== Discus throw ===
- 1960: Miguel de la Quadra-Salcedo
- 1961: Luis Rodríguez
- 1962: Antonio Parés
- 1963: Luis Rodríguez
- 1964: Alfonso Vidal-Quadras
- 1965: Luis Rodríguez
- 1966: Luis Rodríguez
- 1967: José Banzo
- 1968: José Banzo
- 1969: José Banzo
- 1970: José Banzo
- 1971: José Banzo
- 1972: Agustín Loidi
- 1973: José Banzo
- 1974: Sinesio Garrachón
- 1975: Sinesio Garrachón
- 1976: Sinesio Garrachón
- 1977: Sinesio Garrachón
- 1978: Sinesio Garrachón
- 1979: Sinesio Garrachón
- 1980: Sinesio Garrachón
- 1981: Sinesio Garrachón
- 1982: Sinesio Garrachón
- 1983: Sinesio Garrachón
- 1984: Sinesio Garrachón
- 1985: Sinesio Garrachón
- 1986: Sinesio Garrachón
- 1987: David Martínez
- 1988: David Martínez
- 1989: David Martínez
- 1990: David Martínez
- 1991: David Martínez
- 1992: David Martínez
- 1993: José Luis Valencia
- 1994: David Martínez
- 1995: David Martínez
- 1996: David Martínez
- 1997: José Luis Valencia
- 1998: José Luis Valencia
- 1999: José Luis Valencia
- 2000: David Martínez
- 2001: Mario Pestano
- 2002: Mario Pestano
- 2003: Mario Pestano
- 2004: Mario Pestano
- 2005: Mario Pestano
- 2006: Mario Pestano

=== Hammer throw ===
- 1960: José Luis Falcón
- 1961: José Luis Falcón
- 1962: José Luis Falcón
- 1963: José María Elorriaga
- 1964: José Otero
- 1965: José Otero
- 1966: José Otero
- 1967: José Luis Martínez
- 1968: José Luis Martínez
- 1969: Antonio Fiblá
- 1970: José Alcántara
- 1971: José Alcántara
- 1972: José Alcántara
- 1973: José Alcántara
- 1974: Javier Cortezón
- 1975: Javier Cortezón
- 1976: José Alcántara
- 1977: Antonio Fiblá
- 1978: José Alcántara
- 1979: Juan Carlos Álvarez
- 1980: Raúl Jimeno
- 1981: Raúl Jimeno
- 1982: Raúl Jimeno
- 1983: Raúl Jimeno
- 1984: Raúl Jimeno
- 1985: Raúl Jimeno
- 1986: Raúl Jimeno
- 1987: Francisco Fuentes
- 1988: Francisco Fuentes
- 1989: Raúl Jimeno
- 1990: Antón María Godall
- 1991: Antón María Godall
- 1992: Alex Marfull
- 1993: Francisco Fuentes
- 1994: Francisco Fuentes
- 1995: José Manuel Pérez
- 1996: José Manuel Pérez
- 1997: José Manuel Pérez
- 1998: José Manuel Pérez
- 1999: Moisés Campeny
- 2000: Moisés Campeny
- 2001: Moisés Campeny
- 2002: Moisés Campeny
- 2003: Moisés Campeny
- 2004: Moisés Campeny
- 2005: Moisés Campeny
- 2006: Moisés Campeny

=== Javelin throw ===
- 1960: Alfonso de Andrés
- 1961: Alfonso de Andrés
- 1962: Alfonso de Andrés
- 1963: Alfonso de Andrés
- 1964: Alfonso de Andrés
- 1965: Alfonso de Andrés
- 1966: Alfonso de Andrés
- 1967: Alfonso de Andrés
- 1968: Fernando Tallón
- 1969: Fernando Tallón
- 1970: Fernando Tallón
- 1971: Fernando Tallón
- 1972: Gonzalo Juliani
- 1973: Gonzalo Juliani
- 1974: Fernando Tallón
- 1975: Fernando Tallón
- 1976: Gonzalo Juliani
- 1977: Gonzalo Juliani
- 1978: Miguel Cánovas
- 1979: Manuel de Miguel
- 1980: Miguel Cánovas
- 1981: Augusto Lao
- 1982: Augusto Lao
- 1983: Antonio Lago
- 1984: Antonio Lago
- 1985: Juan Rosell
- 1986: Julián Sotelo
- 1987: Antonio Lago
- 1988: Julián Sotelo
- 1989: Enric Bassols
- 1990: Julián Sotelo
- 1991: Julián Sotelo
- 1992: Julián Sotelo
- 1993: Raimundo Fernández
- 1994: Julián Sotelo
- 1995: Julián Sotelo
- 1996: Raimundo Fernández
- 1997: Antonio Estebán
- 1998: Alejandro García
- 1999: Gustavo Dacal
- 2000: Gustavo Dacal
- 2001: Eduardo Veranes
- 2002: Gustavo Dacal
- 2003: Gustavo Dacal
- 2004: Gustavo Dacal
- 2005: Gustavo Dacal
- 2006: Gustavo Dacal

=== Barra Vasca ===
This event is unique to the Spanish Championships, based on a traditional Basque sport.

- 1960: Manuel Clavero
- 1961: Manuel Clavero
- 1962: Bonifacio Allende
- 1963: Manuel Clavero

=== Decathlon ===
- 1960: José Apráiz
- 1961: Luis Onaindía
- 1962: José Blanc
- 1963: Luis Onaindía
- 1964: Not held
- 1965: Ignacio Martínez de Osaba
- 1966: Rafael Cano
- 1967: Rafael Cano
- 1968: Francisco Griso
- 1969: Miguel Cosegal
- 1970: Rafael Cano
- 1971: Rafael Cano
- 1972: Pedro Pablo Fernández
- 1973: Rafael Cano
- 1974: Rafael Cano
- 1975: Rafael Cano
- 1976: Rafael Cano
- 1977: Roberto Cabrejas
- 1978: Jesús Abadía
- 1979: Jesús Abadía
- 1980: Jesús Abadía
- 1981: Carlos Azulay
- 1982: David Méler
- 1983: José María Royo
- 1984: Gerardo Trujillano
- 1985: Luis Guillén
- 1986: Miguel Barahona
- 1987: Javier Aledo
- 1988: Carlos Azulay
- 1989: Antonio Peñalver
- 1990: Álvaro Burrell
- 1991: Francisco Javier Benet
- 1992: Xavier Brunet
- 1993: Xavier Brunet
- 1994: Antonio Peñalver
- 1995: Francisco Javier Benet
- 1996: Francisco Javier Benet
- 1997: Francisco Javier Benet
- 1998: Francisco José Caro
- 1999: Francisco Javier Benet
- 2000: Marcos Moreno
- 2001: Oscar González
- 2002: Francisco José Caro
- 2003: Oscar González
- 2004: David Gómez Martínez
- 2005: Oscar González
- 2006: Agustín Félix

=== 20 kilometres walk ===
The event was held on a track in 1981, 1982, 1985, 1986, and 1989.

- 1960: Jorge Ribas
- 1961: Pascual Aparici
- 1962: Not held
- 1963: Vicente Caminal
- 1964: Ramón Ribas
- 1965: Francisco Sanahuja
- 1966: Manuel Cabrera
- 1967: Martín Cassayas
- 1968: Luis Arnau
- 1969: Víctor Campos
- 1970: Víctor Campos
- 1971: Víctor Campos
- 1972: Víctor Campos
- 1973: Víctor Campos
- 1974: José Marín
- 1975: José Marín
- 1976: Jorge Llopart
- 1977: José Marín
- 1978: Agustín Jorba
- 1979: José Marín
- 1980: Manuel Alcalde
- 1981: José Marín
- 1982: Francisco Botonero
- 1983: Francisco Botonero
- 1984: Manuel Alcalde
- 1985: José Marín
- 1986: Daniel Plaza
- 1987: José Marín
- 1988: José Marín
- 1989: Daniel Plaza
- 1990: Miguel Ángel Prieto
- 1991: Valentí Massana
- 1992: Valentí Massana
- 1993: Valentí Massana
- 1994: Valentí Massana
- 1995: Valentí Massana
- 1996: Daniel Plaza
- 1997: Valentí Massana
- 1998: Paquillo Fernández
- 1999: Paquillo Fernández
- 2000: Paquillo Fernández
- 2001: Paquillo Fernández
- 2002: Paquillo Fernández
- 2003: Paquillo Fernández
- 2004: Paquillo Fernández
- 2005: Juan Manuel Molina
- 2006: Benjamín Sánchez

=== 50 kilometres walk ===
- 1960: Jorge Ribas
- 1961: Jorge Ribas
- 1962: Pascual Aparici
- 1963: Pascual Aparici
- 1964: Pascual Aparici
- 1965: Pascual Aparici
- 1966: Francisco Sanahuja
- 1967: Francisco Sanahuja
- 1968: Francisco Sanahuja
- 1969: Antonio Amorós
- 1970: Manuel Garcés
- 1971: Agustín Jorba
- 1972: Agustín Jorba
- 1973: Agustín Jorba
- 1974: José María Villagrasa
- 1975: Agustín Jorba
- 1976: Agustín Jorba
- 1977: Agustín Jorba
- 1978: Jorge Llopart
- 1979: Jorge Llopart
- 1980: José Marín
- 1981: Jorge Llopart
- 1982: José Marín
- 1983: José Marín
- 1984: José Marín
- 1985: Jorge Llopart
- 1986: Jorge Llopart
- 1987: Manuel Alcalde
- 1988: José Marín
- 1989: Jorge Llopart
- 1990: Jorge Llopart
- 1991: Jorge Llopart
- 1992: Jaime Barroso
- 1993: Valentí Massana
- 1994: Valentí Massana
- 1995: Valentí Massana
- 1996: Valentí Massana
- 1997: Jesús Ángel García
- 1998: Santiago Pérez
- 1999: Daniel Plaza
- 2000: Jesús Ángel García
- 2001: Mikel Odriozola
- 2002: Mikel Odriozola
- 2003: Mikel Odriozola
- 2004: José Antonio González
- 2005: Mikel Odriozola
- 2006: Mikel Odriozola

=== Cross country (long course) ===
- 1960: Carlos Pérez
- 1961: Antonio Amorós
- 1962: Mariano Haro
- 1963: Mariano Haro
- 1964: Francisco Aritmendi
- 1965: Francisco Aritmendi
- 1966: Fernando Aguilar
- 1967: Fernando Aguilar
- 1968: Mariano Haro
- 1969: Mariano Haro
- 1970: Juan Hidalgo
- 1971: Mariano Haro
- 1972: Mariano Haro
- 1973: Mariano Haro
- 1974: Mariano Haro
- 1975: Mariano Haro
- 1976: Mariano Haro
- 1977: Mariano Haro
- 1978: Fernando Cerrada
- 1979: Fernando Cerrada
- 1980: José Luis González
- 1981: José Luis González
- 1982: Antonio Prieto
- 1983: Antonio Prieto
- 1984: Antonio Prieto
- 1985: Constantino Esparcia
- 1986: Vicente Polo
- 1987: Constantino Esparcia
- 1988: Constantino Esparcia
- 1989: Alejandro Gómez
- 1990: Martín Fiz
- 1991: Antonio Prieto
- 1992: Martín Fiz
- 1993: Francisco Guerra
- 1994: José Carlos Adán
- 1995: Alejandro Gómez
- 1996: José Manuel García
- 1997: Julio Rey
- 1998: Julio Rey
- 1999: Fabián Roncero
- 2000: Enrique Molina
- 2001: Fabián Roncero
- 2002: José Manuel Martínez
- 2003: Fabián Roncero
- 2004: Juan Carlos de la Ossa
- 2005: Juan Carlos de la Ossa
- 2006: Juan Carlos de la Ossa

=== Cross country (short course) ===
- 2002: Antonio David Jiménez
- 2003: Yousef El Nasri
- 2004: Antonio Martínez
- 2005: Roberto García
- 2006: José Luis Blanco

=== Mountain running ===
- 2004: Vicente Capitán
- 2005: Vicente Capitán
- 2006: Enrique Meneses

== Women ==
=== 100 metres ===
- 1963: María Luisa Cosegal
- 1964: Elena Souto
- 1965: Emma Albertos
- 1966: Emma Albertos
- 1967: María Luisa Orobia
- 1968: María Luisa Orobia
- 1969: María Luisa Orobia
- 1970: Pilar Fanlo
- 1971: María Margarita Martínez
- 1972: Lourdes Valdor
- 1973: Pilar Fanlo
- 1974: Ela Cifuentes
- 1975: Yolanda Oroz
- 1976: Ela Cifuentes
- 1977: Yolanda Oroz
- 1978: Loles Vives
- 1979: Lourdes Valdor
- 1980: Lourdes Valdor
- 1981: Mercedes Cano
- 1982: Teresa Rioné
- 1983: Teresa Rioné
- 1984: Teresa Rioné
- 1985: Blanca Lacambra
- 1986: Blanca Lacambra
- 1987: Yolanda Díaz
- 1988: Sandra Myers
- 1989: Yolanda Díaz
- 1990: Cristina Castro Salvador
- 1991: Cristina Castro Salvador
- 1992: Cristina Castro Salvador
- 1993: Patricia Morales
- 1994: Cristina Castro Salvador
- 1995: Carme Blay
- 1996: Cristina Castro Salvador
- 1997: Carme Blay
- 1998: Arancha Iglesias
- 1999: Arancha Iglesias
- 2000: Carme Blay
- 2001: Carme Blay
- 2002: Carme Blay
- 2003: Carme Blay
- 2004: Arancha Iglesias
- 2005: Belén Recio
- 2006: Belén Recio

=== 200 metres ===
- 1963: Ana María Gibert
- 1964: Elena Souto
- 1965: Emma Albertos
- 1966: Emma Albertos
- 1967: María Luisa Orobia
- 1968: María Luisa Orobia
- 1969: María Luisa Orobia
- 1970: Josefina Salgado
- 1971: Josefina Salgado
- 1972: Begoña Lozano
- 1973: Begoña Lozano
- 1974: Josefina Salgado
- 1975: Rosa Colorado
- 1976: Ela Cifuentes
- 1977: Rosa Colorado
- 1978: Ela Cifuentes
- 1979: Lourdes Valdor
- 1980: Maria José Martínez
- 1981: Yolanda Oroz
- 1982: Teresa Rioné
- 1983: Lourdes Valdor
- 1984: Teresa Rioné
- 1985: Blanca Lacambra
- 1986: Blanca Lacambra
- 1987: Blanca Lacambra
- 1988: Sandra Myers
- 1989: Sandra Myers
- 1990: Cristina Castro Salvador
- 1991: Carmen García Campero
- 1992: Mónica Casanovas
- 1993: Bárbara Lovaco
- 1994: Cristina Pérez
- 1995: Lorena Orti
- 1996: Mercedes Martín
- 1997: Arantxa Reinares
- 1998: Elena Córcoles
- 1999: Julia Alba
- 2000: Arantxa Reinares
- 2001: Isabel Vert
- 2002: Arantxa Reinares
- 2003: Cristina Sanz
- 2004: Cristina Sanz
- 2005: Belén Recio
- 2006: Belén Recio

=== 400 metres ===
- 1964: Rosa Sierra
- 1965: Celestina Gómez
- 1966: Josefina Salgado
- 1967: Josefina Salgado
- 1968: Josefina Salgado
- 1969: Ángeles Mandado
- 1970: Josefina Salgado
- 1971: Josefina Salgado
- 1972: Rosa Colorado
- 1973: Josefina Salgado
- 1974: Rosa Colorado
- 1975: Rosa Colorado
- 1976: Rosa Colorado
- 1977: Montserrat Pujol
- 1978: Rosa Colorado
- 1979: Fina María Polo
- 1980: Rosa Colorado
- 1981: Carmen Cocolina
- 1982: Montserrat Pujol
- 1983: Gregoria Ferrer
- 1984: Esther Lahoz
- 1985: Esther Lahoz
- 1986: Esther Lahoz
- 1987: Esther Lahoz
- 1988: Maite Zúñiga
- 1989: Julia Merino
- 1990: Sandra Myers
- 1991: Sandra Myers
- 1992: Julia Merino
- 1993: Sandra Myers
- 1994: Sandra Myers
- 1995: Sandra Myers
- 1996: Sandra Myers
- 1997: Yolanda Reyes
- 1998: Yolanda Reyes
- 1999: Lisette Ferri
- 2000: Norfalia Carabalí
- 2001: Julia Alba
- 2002: Julia Alba
- 2003: Julia Alba
- 2004: Julia Alba
- 2005: Julia Alba
- 2006: Marlén Estévez

=== 800 metres ===
- 1964: María Aránzazu Vega
- 1965: María Aránzazu Vega
- 1966: Teresa Torres
- 1967: Josefina Salgado
- 1968: Coro Fuentes
- 1969: Coro Fuentes
- 1970: Coro Fuentes
- 1971: Belén Azpeitia
- 1972: Belén Azpeitia
- 1973: Josefina Salgado
- 1974: Carmen Valero
- 1975: Carmen Valero
- 1976: Carmen Valero
- 1977: Rosa Ochandiano
- 1978: Gloria Pallé
- 1979: Montserrat Pujol
- 1980: Gloria Pallé
- 1981: Rosa Ochandiano
- 1982: Maite Zúñiga
- 1983: Maite Zúñiga
- 1984: Rosa Colorado
- 1985: Rosa Colorado
- 1986: Rosa Colorado
- 1987: Rosa Colorado
- 1988: Rosa Colorado
- 1989: Montserrat Pujol
- 1990: Maite Zúñiga
- 1991: Maite Zúñiga
- 1992: Maite Zúñiga
- 1993: Amaia Andrés
- 1994: Sonia Álvarez
- 1995: Eva García
- 1996: Nuria Fernández
- 1997: Ana Amelia Menéndez
- 1998: Ana Amelia Menéndez
- 1999: Nuria Fernández
- 2000: Mayte Martínez
- 2001: Mayte Martínez
- 2002: Mayte Martínez
- 2003: Marlén Estévez
- 2004: Mayte Martínez
- 2005: Mayte Martínez
- 2006: Mayte Martínez

=== 1500 metres ===
- 1969: Consuelo Alonso
- 1970: Coro Fuentes
- 1971: Coro Fuentes
- 1972: Carmen Valero
- 1973: Carmen Valero
- 1974: Carmen Valero
- 1975: Carmen Valero
- 1976: Carmen Valero
- 1977: Carmen Valero
- 1978: Carmen Valero
- 1979: Mercedes Calleja
- 1980: Amelia Lorza
- 1981: Asunción Sinovas
- 1982: Mercedes Calleja
- 1983: Amelia Lorza
- 1984: Mercedes Calleja
- 1985: Asunción Sinovas
- 1986: Gloria Pallé
- 1987: Angelines Rodríguez
- 1988: Lourdes Miquel
- 1989: Maite Zúñiga
- 1990: Montserrat Pujol
- 1991: Pilar Sisniega
- 1992: Mayte Montaña
- 1993: Maite Zúñiga
- 1994: Maite Zúñiga
- 1995: Maite Zúñiga
- 1996: Marta Domínguez
- 1997: Maite Zúñiga
- 1998: Maite Zúñiga
- 1999: Ana Amelia Menéndez
- 2000: Natalia Rodríguez
- 2001: Natalia Rodríguez
- 2002: Natalia Rodríguez
- 2003: Natalia Rodríguez
- 2004: Natalia Rodríguez
- 2005: Natalia Rodríguez
- 2006: Nuria Fernández

=== 3000 metres ===
- 1974: Carmen Valero
- 1975: Carmen Valero
- 1976: Carmen Valero
- 1977: Encarna Escudero
- 1978: Carmen Valero
- 1979: Pilar Fernández
- 1980: Pilar Fernández
- 1981: Asunción Sinovas
- 1982: Pilar Fernández
- 1983: Ana Isabel Alonso
- 1984: Asunción Sinovas
- 1985: Amelia Lorza
- 1986: Asunción Sinovas
- 1987: Ana Isabel Alonso
- 1988: Dolores Rizo
- 1989: Estela Estévez
- 1990: Estela Estévez
- 1991: Julia Vaquero
- 1992: Julia Vaquero
- 1993: Estela Estévez
- 1994: Estela Estévez

=== 5000 metres ===
- 1982: Pilar Fernández
- 1983: Pilar Fernández
- 1984: Ana Isabel Alonso
- 1985: Amelia Lorza
- 1986: Carmen Valero
- 1987: Asunción Sinovas
- 1988: Angelines Rodríguez
- 1989: Estela Estévez
- 1990: Estela Estévez
- 1991: Estela Estévez
- 1992: Estela Estévez
- 1993: Julia Vaquero
- 1994: Rocío Ríos
- 1995: Teresa Recio
- 1996: Julia Vaquero
- 1997: María Cristina Petite
- 1998: Marta Domínguez
- 1999: Marta Domínguez
- 2000: Marta Domínguez
- 2001: Marta Domínguez
- 2002: Marta Domínguez
- 2003: Marta Domínguez
- 2004: Amaia Piedra
- 2005: Yesenia Centeno
- 2006: Judith Plá

=== 10,000 metres ===
- 1984: Amelia Lorza
- 1985: Ana Isabel Alonso
- 1986: Mercedes Calleja
- 1987: María Luisa Irízar
- 1988: Ana Isabel Alonso
- 1989: María Luisa Irízar
- 1990: Carmen Brunet
- 1991: Ana Isabel Alonso
- 1992: Rocío Ríos
- 1993: Rocío Ríos
- 1994: Ana Isabel Alonso
- 1995: Carmen Fuentes
- 1996: Rocío Ríos
- 1997: Rocío Ríos
- 1998: Julia Vaquero
- 1999: Teresa Recio
- 2000: Teresa Recio
- 2001: María Luisa Larraga
- 2002: María Luisa Larraga
- 2003: Yesenia Centeno
- 2004: María Luisa Larraga
- 2005: Teresa Recio
- 2006: Marta Domínguez

=== 15K run ===
- 1990: Angelines Rodríguez
- 1991: Carmen Brunet

=== 20K run ===
- 1982: Joaquina Casas
- 1983: Joaquina Casas
- 1984: Joaquina Casas
- 1985: María Luisa Irízar
- 1986: Esther Pedrosa
- 1987: María Luisa Irízar
- 1988: Marina Prat
- 1989: Carmen Brunet

=== Half marathon ===
- 1992: Rocío Ríos
- 1993: María Luisa Muñoz
- 1994: Rocío Ríos
- 1995: Rocío Ríos
- 1996: Teresa Recio
- 1997: Angelines Rodríguez
- 1998: María Luisa Larraga
- 1999: Ana Isabel Alonso
- 2000: Griselda González
- 2001: María Abel
- 2002: Griselda González
- 2003: Faustina María
- 2004: Beatriz Ros
- 2005: Yesenia Centeno

=== Marathon ===
The 1984 Women's Spanish Marathon Championship was held on a short course, but the winner remained valid.

- 1981: Rosa Talavera
- 1982: Consuelo Alonso
- 1983: Consuelo Alonso
- 1984: Consuelo Alonso
- 1985: Mercedes Calleja
- 1986: Mercedes Calleja
- 1987: María Luisa Irízar
- 1988: María Luisa Irízar
- 1989: Marina Prat
- 1990: Marina Prat
- 1991: María Luisa Irízar
- 1992: Ana Isabel Alonso
- 1993: Mónica Pont
- 1994: Ana Isabel Alonso
- 1995: María Luisa Irízar
- 1996: Aurora Pérez
- 1997: Rocío Ríos
- 1998: Not held
- 1999: Not held
- 2000: María Luisa Muñoz
- 2001: María Jesús Zorraquín
- 2002: Not held
- 2003: Not held
- 2004: Not held
- 2005: María José Pueyo

=== 100K run ===
- 2001: Patricia González
- 2002: Laudelina Franco
- 2003: Laudelina Franco

=== 3000 metres steeplechase ===
A women's steeplechase was held in 2001 but did not have official championship status.

- 2001: Tamara Sanfabio
- 2002: Zulema Fuentes-Pila
- 2003: Rosa Morató
- 2004: Rosa Morató
- 2005: Rosa Morató
- 2006: Rosa Morató

=== 80 metres hurdles ===
- 1963: María Luisa Cosegal
- 1964: Natividad Astray
- 1965: Teresa Montaña
- 1966: María Jesús Sánchez
- 1967: Ana María Molina
- 1968: Ana María Molina

=== 100 metres hurdles ===
- 1969: María Jesús Sánchez
- 1970: María Jesús Sánchez
- 1971: Ana María Molina
- 1972: María Jesús Sánchez
- 1973: Maria José Martínez
- 1974: María José Martínez
- 1975: María José Martínez
- 1976: María José Martínez
- 1977: María José Martínez
- 1978: María José Martínez
- 1979: María José Martínez
- 1980: María José Martínez
- 1981: María José Martínez
- 1982: María José Martínez
- 1983: Isabel Martín
- 1984: María José Martínez-Patiño
- 1985: María José Martínez
- 1986: Ana Isabel Guerra
- 1987: Ana Barrenechea
- 1988: María José Mardomingo
- 1989: Ana Barrenechea
- 1990: María José Mardomingo
- 1991: Ana Barrenechea
- 1992: María José Mardomingo
- 1993: María José Mardomingo
- 1994: María José Mardomingo
- 1995: María José Mardomingo
- 1996: María José Mardomingo
- 1997: María José Mardomingo
- 1998: María José Mardomingo
- 1999: Nerea Azkárate
- 2000: Nerea Azkárate
- 2001: Glory Alozie
- 2002: Glory Alozie
- 2003: Aliuska López
- 2004: Glory Alozie
- 2005: Glory Alozie
- 2006: Glory Alozie

=== 400 metres hurdles ===
- 1977: María Luisa Zabala
- 1978: Montserrat Pujol
- 1979: Rosa Colorado
- 1980: Rosa Colorado
- 1981: Montserrat Pujol
- 1982: Rosa Colorado
- 1983: Rosa Colorado
- 1984: Yolanda Dolz
- 1985: Cristina Pérez
- 1986: Cristina Pérez
- 1987: Cristina Pérez
- 1988: Cristina Pérez
- 1989: Esther Lahoz
- 1990: Cristina Pérez
- 1991: Idoia Granda
- 1992: Miriam Alonso
- 1993: Miriam Alonso
- 1994: Miriam Alonso
- 1995: Miriam Alonso
- 1996: Eva Paniagua
- 1997: Miriam Alonso
- 1998: Eva Paniagua
- 1999: Eva Paniagua
- 2000: Miriam Alonso
- 2001: Eva Paniagua
- 2002: Beatriz Montero
- 2003: Cora Olivero
- 2004: Cora Olivero
- 2005: Cora Olivero
- 2006: Cora Olivero

=== High jump ===
- 1960: Mercedes Morales
- 1961: Gisela Struchtemeier
- 1962: Mercedes Morales
- 1963: Teresa Torres
- 1964: Teresa María Roca
- 1965: Sagrario Aguado
- 1966: Teresa María Roca
- 1967: Sagrario Aguado
- 1968: Teresa María Roca
- 1969: Sagrario Aguado
- 1970: Sagrario Aguado
- 1971: Sagrario Aguado
- 1972: Sagrario Aguado
- 1973: Isabel Mozún
- 1974: Isabel Mozún
- 1975: Isabel Mozún
- 1976: Isabel Mozún
- 1977: Isabel Mozún
- 1978: Isabel Mozún
- 1979: Isabel Mozún
- 1980: Isabel Mozún
- 1981: Isabel Mozún
- 1982: Covadonga Mateos
- 1983: Covadonga Mateos
- 1984: Asunción Morte
- 1985: Mónica Calvo
- 1986: Isabel Mozún
- 1987: María Mar Martínez
- 1988: Belén Sáenz
- 1989: Belén Sáenz
- 1990: Belén Sáenz
- 1991: María Mar Martínez
- 1992: Marta Mendía
- 1993: Carlota Castrejana
- 1994: Marta Mendía
- 1995: María Mar Martínez
- 1996: Marta Mendía
- 1997: Marta Mendía
- 1998: Marta Mendía
- 1999: Marta Mendía
- 2000: Ruth Beitia
- 2001: Marta Mendía
- 2002: Marta Mendía
- 2003: Ruth Beitia
- 2004: Cora Olivero
- 2005: Cora Olivero
- 2006: Cora Olivero

=== Pole vault ===
A women's pole vault was held in 1994 without official championship status.

- 1994: Silvia Delgado
- 1995: Dana Cervantes
- 1996: Naiara Larrea
- 1997: Esther Auyanet
- 1998: María Mar Sánchez
- 1999: Dana Cervantes
- 2000: María Mar Sánchez
- 2001: María Mar Sánchez
- 2002: Dana Cervantes
- 2003: Naroa Agirre
- 2004: Dana Cervantes
- 2005: María Mar Sánchez
- 2006: Naroa Agirre

=== Long jump ===
- 1963: Ana María Gibert
- 1964: Ana María Gibert
- 1965: Blanca Miret
- 1966: Rosa María García Ordoqui
- 1967: María Luisa García Pena
- 1968: Cristina Alonso
- 1969: Rosa María García Ordoqui
- 1970: Rosa María García Ordoqui
- 1971: Isabel Montaña
- 1972: Isabel Montaña
- 1973: Carolina Nolten
- 1974: Josefina Salgado
- 1975: Lourdes Unanue
- 1976: Ángeles Moinelo
- 1977: María José Martínez
- 1978: María José Martínez
- 1979: María José Martínez
- 1980: Olga Dalmau
- 1981: Olga Dalmau
- 1982: Olga Dalmau
- 1983: Estrella Roldán
- 1984: Olga Dalmau
- 1985: María José Martínez
- 1986: María Jesús Fernández
- 1987: Estrella Roldán
- 1988: Isabel López
- 1989: Sandra Myers
- 1990: Gregoria Miranda
- 1991: Isabel López
- 1992: María Jesús Martín
- 1993: Luisa López
- 1994: Yolanda Rodríguez
- 1995: Dayana Etchenique
- 1996: Ana María Castiñeira
- 1997: Vanessa Peñalver
- 1998: Yolanda Rodríguez
- 1999: Niurka Montalvo
- 2000: Niurka Montalvo
- 2001: Niurka Montalvo
- 2002: Niurka Montalvo
- 2003: Concepción Montaner
- 2004: Concepción Montaner
- 2005: Niurka Montalvo
- 2006: Concepción Montaner

=== Triple jump ===
- 1990: Concepción Paredes
- 1991: Concepción Paredes
- 1992: Concepción Paredes
- 1993: Concepción Paredes
- 1994: Concepción Paredes
- 1995: Concepción Paredes
- 1996: Concepción Paredes
- 1997: Concepción Paredes
- 1998: Concepción Paredes
- 1999: Niurka Montalvo
- 2000: Carlota Castrejana
- 2001: Carlota Castrejana
- 2002: Carlota Castrejana
- 2003: Carlota Castrejana
- 2004: Carlota Castrejana
- 2005: Carlota Castrejana
- 2006: Carlota Castrejana

=== Shot put ===
- 1964: María Luisa García Pena
- 1965: María Luisa García Pena
- 1966: María Luisa García Pena
- 1967: María Luisa García Pena
- 1968: Concepción Laso
- 1969: Ana María Molina
- 1970: María Guembe
- 1971: Ana María Molina
- 1972: María Guembe
- 1973: Ana María Molina
- 1974: Ana María Molina
- 1975: Ana María Molina
- 1976: Ana María Molina
- 1977: Ana María Molina
- 1978: Ana María Molina
- 1979: Encarnación Gambús
- 1980: Encarnación Gambús
- 1981: Encarnación Gambús
- 1982: Enriqueta Díaz
- 1983: Cristina Carballo
- 1984: Enriqueta Díaz
- 1985: Enriqueta Díaz
- 1986: Margarita Ramos
- 1987: Margarita Ramos
- 1988: Margarita Ramos
- 1989: Margarita Ramos
- 1990: Margarita Ramos
- 1991: Margarita Ramos
- 1992: Margarita Ramos
- 1993: Margarita Ramos
- 1994: Margarita Ramos
- 1995: Martina de la Puente
- 1996: Margarita Ramos
- 1997: Margarita Ramos
- 1998: Margarita Ramos
- 1999: Martina de la Puente
- 2000: Martina de la Puente
- 2001: Martina de la Puente
- 2002: Irache Quintanal
- 2003: Irache Quintanal
- 2004: Irache Quintanal
- 2005: Martina de la Puente
- 2006: Martina de la Puente

=== Discus throw ===
- 1964: María Luisa García Pena
- 1965: María Luisa García Pena
- 1966: María Luisa García Pena
- 1967: María Luisa García Pena
- 1968: María José Fernández
- 1969: María Luisa García Pena
- 1970: María José Fernández
- 1971: María José Fernández
- 1972: María Luisa García Pena
- 1973: Dulce López
- 1974: Mercedes Ribelles
- 1975: Ana María Molina
- 1976: Ana María Molina
- 1977: Carmen García
- 1978: Encarnación Gambús
- 1979: Encarnación Gambús
- 1980: Carmen García
- 1981: Encarnación Gambús
- 1982: Encarnación Gambús
- 1983: Encarnación Gambús
- 1984: Encarnación Gambús
- 1985: Ángeles Barreiro
- 1986: Ángeles Barreiro
- 1987: Ángeles Barreiro
- 1988: Ángeles Barreiro
- 1989: Ángeles Barreiro
- 1990: Ángeles Barreiro
- 1991: Ángeles Barreiro
- 1992: Ángeles Barreiro
- 1993: Sonia Godall
- 1994: Ángeles Barreiro
- 1995: Ángeles Barreiro
- 1996: Ángeles Barreiro
- 1997: Rita Lora
- 1998: Carmen Solé
- 1999: Rita Lora
- 2000: Alice Matějková
- 2001: Alice Matějková
- 2002: Alice Matějková
- 2003: Alice Matějková
- 2004: Irache Quintanal
- 2005: Alice Matějková
- 2006: Irache Quintanal

=== Hammer throw ===
A women's hammer throw was held in 1994 without official championship status.

- 1994: Sonia Godall
- 1995: Susana Reguela
- 1996: Susana Reguela
- 1997: Susana Reguela
- 1998: Susana Reguela
- 1999: Dolores Pedrares
- 2000: Dolores Pedrares
- 2001: Dolores Pedrares
- 2002: Dolores Pedrares
- 2003: Berta Castells
- 2004: Berta Castells
- 2005: Berta Castells
- 2006: Berta Castells

=== Javelin throw ===
- 1963: María Luisa García Pena
- 1964: María Luisa García Pena
- 1965: María Luisa García Pena
- 1966: María Luisa García Pena
- 1967: María Luisa García Pena
- 1968: María José Fernández
- 1969: María José Fernández
- 1970: María José Fernández
- 1971: María José Fernández
- 1972: María José Fernández
- 1973: Rosa María Fernández
- 1974: María José Fernández
- 1975: María José Fernández
- 1976: María José Fernández
- 1977: Natividad Vizcaíno
- 1978: Natividad Vizcaíno
- 1979: Natividad Vizcaíno
- 1980: Natividad Vizcaíno
- 1981: Natividad Vizcaíno
- 1982: Natividad Vizcaíno
- 1983: Aurora Moreno
- 1984: Aurora Moreno
- 1985: Aurora Moreno
- 1986: Natividad Vizcaíno
- 1987: Natividad Vizcaíno
- 1988: Natividad Vizcaíno
- 1989: Natividad Vizcaíno
- 1990: Marta Sánchez
- 1991: María José Maíquez
- 1992: Cristina Larrea
- 1993: Cristina Larrea
- 1994: Cristina Larrea
- 1995: Idoia Mariezkurrena
- 1996: Idoia Mariezkurrena
- 1997: Idoia Mariezkurrena
- 1998: Marta Míguez
- 1999: Marta Míguez
- 2000: Marta Míguez
- 2001: Marta Míguez
- 2002: Marta Míguez
- 2003: Mercedes Chilla
- 2004: Mercedes Chilla
- 2005: Mercedes Chilla
- 2006: Mercedes Chilla

=== Pentathlon ===
- 1965: Natividad Astray
- 1966: Gisela Struchtemeier
- 1967: Ana María Molina
- 1968: Ana María Molina
- 1969: Ana María Molina
- 1970: Ana María Molina
- 1971: Ana María Molina
- 1972: Isabel Montaña
- 1973: Carolina Nolten
- 1974: Pilar Fanlo
- 1975: Rosa Colorado
- 1976: Carolina Nolten
- 1977: Rosa Colorado
- 1978: Montserrat Pujol
- 1979: Ana Pérez
- 1980: Ana Pérez

=== Heptathlon ===
- 1981: Ana Pérez
- 1982: Ana Pérez
- 1983: Josefa López
- 1984: Ana Pérez
- 1985: Ana Pérez
- 1986: Ana Pérez
- 1987: Susana Cruz
- 1988: María Díez
- 1989: Susana Cruz
- 1990: Susana Cruz
- 1991: Susana Cruz
- 1992: Susana Cruz
- 1993: Patricia Guevara
- 1994: Imma Clopés
- 1995: Isabel Siles
- 1996: Imma Clopés
- 1997: Imma Clopés
- 1998: Imma Clopés
- 1999: Imma Clopés
- 2000: Imma Clopés
- 2001: María Peinado
- 2002: Imma Clopés
- 2003: María Peinado
- 2004: María Peinado
- 2005: María Peinado
- 2006: María Peinado

=== 5000 metres walk ===
- 1981: Teresa Palacio
- 1982: Teresa Palacio
- 1983: Yolanda Fernández
- 1984: Mari Cruz Díaz
- 1985: Emilia Cano
- 1986: Mari Cruz Díaz
- 1987: María Reyes Sobrino
- 1988: María Reyes Sobrino
- 1989: María Reyes Sobrino

=== 10,000 metres walk ===
The 1990 event was held on roads.

- 1990: María Reyes Sobrino
- 1991: María Reyes Sobrino
- 1992: Olga Sánchez
- 1993: Encarna Granados
- 1994: Encarna Granados
- 1995: Encarna Granados
- 1996: María Vasco
- 1997: María Vasco
- 1998: María Vasco
- 1999: María Vasco
- 2000: Encarna Granados
- 2001: María Vasco
- 2002: María Vasco
- 2003: María Vasco
- 2004: María Vasco
- 2005: María Vasco
- 2006: María José Poves

=== 10 kilometres walk ===
- 1982: Teresa Palacio
- 1983: Teresa Palacio
- 1984: Mari Cruz Díaz
- 1985: María Reyes Sobrino
- 1986: Mari Cruz Díaz
- 1987: Emilia Cano
- 1988: María Reyes Sobrino
- 1989: María Reyes Sobrino
- 1990: María Reyes Sobrino
- 1991: Emilia Cano
- 1992: Encarna Granados
- 1993: María Reyes Sobrino
- 1994: Encarna Granados
- 1995: Encarna Granados
- 1996: María Vasco
- 1997: Encarna Granados

=== 20 kilometres walk ===
- 1998: María Vasco
- 1999: Teresa Linares
- 2000: Eva Pérez
- 2001: María Vasco
- 2002: María Vasco
- 2003: María Vasco
- 2004: María Vasco
- 2005: María José Poves
- 2006: Beatriz Pascual

=== Cross country (long course) ===
- 1965: María Aránzazu Vega
- 1966: María Aránzazu Vega
- 1967: Coro Fuentes
- 1968: Coro Fuentes
- 1969: Belén Azpeitia
- 1970: Belén Azpeitia
- 1971: Belén Azpeitia
- 1972: Belén Azpeitia
- 1973: Carmen Valero
- 1974: Carmen Valero
- 1975: Carmen Valero
- 1976: Carmen Valero
- 1977: Carmen Valero
- 1978: Carmen Valero
- 1979: Pilar Fernández
- 1980: Amelia Lorza
- 1981: Carmen Valero
- 1982: Mercedes Calleja
- 1983: Pilar Fernández
- 1984: Ana Isabel Alonso
- 1985: Ana Isabel Alonso
- 1986: Carmen Valero
- 1987: Ana Isabel Alonso
- 1988: Ana Isabel Alonso
- 1989: Ana Isabel Alonso
- 1990: Ana Isabel Alonso
- 1991: María Luisa Larraga
- 1992: Julia Vaquero
- 1993: Julia Vaquero
- 1994: Julia Vaquero
- 1995: Julia Vaquero
- 1996: Julia Vaquero
- 1997: Julia Vaquero
- 1998: Julia Vaquero
- 1999: Ana Isabel Alonso
- 2000: María Abel
- 2001: Jacqueline Martín
- 2002: María Luisa Larraga
- 2003: María Abel
- 2004: Amaia Piedra
- 2005: Rosa Morató
- 2006: Marta Domínguez

=== Cross country (short course) ===
- 2002: María Luisa Larraga
- 2003: Iris Fuentes-Pila
- 2004: Jacqueline Martín
- 2005: Jacqueline Martín
- 2006: Zulema Fuentes-Pila

=== Mountain running ===
- 2004: María Isabel Martínez
- 2005: Marta Fernández
- 2006: Marta Fernández
