= 1983 Ibero-American Championships in Athletics – Results =

These are the results of the 1983 Ibero-American Championships in Athletics which took place from 23 to 25 September 1983 at Estadio Juan Serrahima in Barcelona, Spain.

== Men's results ==
=== 100 meters ===
Final – 23 September
Wind: +0.5 m/s

Rank	Name	Nationality	Time	Notes
1st place, gold medalist(s)	José Luis Isalgue	Cuba	10.46	
2nd place, silver medalist(s)	Nelson dos Santos	Brazil	10.54	
3rd place, bronze medalist(s)	Ángel Heras	Spain	10.65	
4	Hugo Alzamora	Argentina	10.99	
5	Luis Barroso	Portugal	11.08	
6	Rodrigo Casar	Mexico	11.21	

=== 200 meters ===
Final – 25 September
Wind: +0.1 m/s

Rank	Name	Nationality	Time	Notes
1st place, gold medalist(s)	Tomás González	Cuba	20.91	
2nd place, silver medalist(s)	Ángel Heras	Spain	21.09	
3rd place, bronze medalist(s)	Evaldo da Silva	Brazil	21.56	
4	Luis Cunha	Portugal	21.74	
5	Hugo Alzamora	Argentina	21.90	

=== 400 meters ===
Final – 25 September

Rank	Name	Nationality	Time	Notes
1st place, gold medalist(s)	Lázaro Martínez	Cuba	46.37	
	José Alonso	Spain	46.92	Guest
2nd place, silver medalist(s)	Sérgio Menezes	Brazil	47.28	
3rd place, bronze medalist(s)	Isidoro Hornillos	Spain	48.12	
4	Ricardo Biojo	Colombia	48.64	
5	Alvaro Silva	Portugal	49.61	
6	Johnny Sterling	Costa Rica	51.54	

=== 800 meters ===
Final – 24 September

Rank	Name	Nationality	Time	Notes
1st place, gold medalist(s)	José Luis González	Spain	1:49.11	
2nd place, silver medalist(s)	Carlos Cabral	Portugal	1:49.32	
3rd place, bronze medalist(s)	José Luíz Barbosa	Brazil	1:50.02	
	José Pacheco	Spain	1:50.07	Guest
	Mário Silva	Portugal	1:50.11	Guest
4	Julio Prado	Cuba	1:54.57	
5	Hugo Allan García	Guatemala	1:56.97	

=== 1500 meters ===
Final – 25 September

Rank	Name	Nationality	Time	Notes
1st place, gold medalist(s)	José Manuel Abascal	Spain	3:51.66	
	Mário Silva	Portugal	3:54.06	Guest
2nd place, silver medalist(s)	Helder Jesús	Portugal	3:54.49	
	Benjamín Fernández	Spain	3:58.06	Guest
3rd place, bronze medalist(s)	Hugo Allan García	Guatemala	4:05.93	

=== 5000 meters ===
Final – 25 September

Rank	Name	Nationality	Time	Notes
1st place, gold medalist(s)	Silvio Salazar	Colombia	13:52.19	
2nd place, silver medalist(s)	Ezequiel Canario	Portugal	13:59.68	
3rd place, bronze medalist(s)	Cándido Alario	Spain	14:24.85	
4	Jhonny Pérez	Bolivia	14:37.91	
5	William Aguirre	Nicaragua	15:30.50	

=== 10,000 meters ===
Final – 24 September

Rank	Name	Nationality	Time	Notes
1st place, gold medalist(s)	Antonio Prieto	Spain	28:58.19	
2nd place, silver medalist(s)	Fernando Miguel	Portugal	30:58.12	
3rd place, bronze medalist(s)	William Aguirre	Nicaragua	32:02.42	

=== Marathon ===
Final – 25 September

Rank	Name	Nationality	Time	Notes
1st place, gold medalist(s)	Roberto García	Spain	2:24:32	
2nd place, silver medalist(s)	Oscar Santos	Portugal	2:33:41	
3rd place, bronze medalist(s)	José Carlos Orué	Argentina	2:38:49	
	Sergio Cazeneuve	Spain	2:40:41	Guest
	Manuel Fernández	Spain	2:55:41	Guest
	Amado Hernández	Spain	3:04:09	Guest
	Vicente Antón	Spain	DNF	Guest
	Vicente Polo	Spain	DNF	Guest
	José Zarzo	Spain	DNF	Guest

=== 110 meters hurdles ===
Final – 25 September
Wind: +0.1 m/s

Rank	Name	Nationality	Time	Notes
	Carlos Sala	Spain	13.74	Guest
1st place, gold medalist(s)	Ángel Bueno	Cuba	13.81	PB
2nd place, silver medalist(s)	Wellington da Nobrega	Brazil	14.33	
3rd place, bronze medalist(s)	Rodrigo Casar	Mexico	14.35	
	Javier Moracho	Spain	DQ	

=== 400 meters hurdles ===
Final – 24 September

Rank	Name	Nationality	Time	Notes
1st place, gold medalist(s)	José Alonso	Spain	50.08	
2nd place, silver medalist(s)	Frank Montiéh	Cuba	50.81	
3rd place, bronze medalist(s)	Ricardo Biojo	Colombia	52.95	
4	José Carvalho	Portugal	53.87	
	Carlos Pereira	Portugal	59.66	Guest

=== 3000 meters steeplechase ===
Final – 25 September

Rank	Name	Nationality	Time	Notes
1st place, gold medalist(s)	Domingo Ramón	Spain	8:27.20	
	Juan Torres	Spain	8:30.12	Guest
2nd place, silver medalist(s)	Emilio Ulloa	Chile	8:37.36	
3rd place, bronze medalist(s)	Adauto Domingues	Brazil	8:40.17	
4	Fernando Couto	Portugal	8:47.80	

=== High jump ===
Final – 25 September

Rank	Name	Nationality	Attempts											Result	Notes
Rank	Name	Nationality	1.95	2.00	2.03	2.06	2.09	2.12	2.14	2.16	2.18	2.20	2.24	Result	Notes
1st place, gold medalist(s)	Jorge Alfaro	Cuba	-	-	-	-	-	o	-	-	xo	o	xxx	2.20	
2nd place, silver medalist(s)	Roberto Cabrejas	Spain	-	-	-	o	-	o	-	xxo	-	xxx		2.16	
3rd place, bronze medalist(s)	Victor Mendes	Portugal	o	o	-	o	-	o	-	xxx				2.12	
	Martí Perarnau	Spain	o	-	o	-	o	o	xx					2.12	Guest
4	Fernando Pastoriza	Argentina	-	-	-	-	o	xxx						2.09	
5	Carlos Izquierdo	Colombia	o	o	o	o	o	xxx						2.09	

=== Pole vault ===
Final – 24 September

Rank	Name	Nationality	Attempts											Result	Notes
Rank	Name	Nationality	3.90	4.30	4.50	4.60	4.70	4.80	4.90	5.00	5.05	5.20	5.50	Result	Notes
1st place, gold medalist(s)	Alberto Ruiz	Spain	-	-	-	-	-	o	-	o	-	o	xxx	5.20	
	Salvador Maranges	Spain	-	-	-	-	o	-	xo	-	o	xxx		5.05	Guest
	Robert Aleu	Spain	-	-	o	-	xo	xxx						4.70	Guest
2nd place, silver medalist(s)	Manuel Miguel	Portugal	-	xo	o	o	xxx							4.50	
3rd place, bronze medalist(s)	Claudio Escauriza	Paraguay	o	xxo	xxx									4.30	

=== Long jump ===
Final – 25 September

Rank	Name	Nationality	Attempts						Result	Notes
Rank	Name	Nationality	1	2	3	4	5	6	Result	Notes
1st place, gold medalist(s)	Jaime Jefferson	Cuba	7.46 (+0.8)	7.64 (+1.2)	7.67 (+1.0)	7.93 (+1.0)	x	7.34 (+0.6)	7.93 (+1.0 m/s)	
2nd place, silver medalist(s)	Antonio Corgos	Spain	7.83 (+1.6)	x	7.67 (+1.0)	7.89 (+1.4)	x	7.90 (+0.4)	7.90 (+0.4 m/s)	
	Jordi Vila	Spain	7.17 (-0.7)	x	7.28 (+0.2)	7.42 (+0.8)	x	x	7.42 (+0.8 m/s)	Guest
	Alberto Solanas	Spain	x	x	7.21 (+0.0)	x	x	x	7.21 (+0.0 m/s)	Guest
	Jacinto Santamaría	Spain	7.10 (+1.0)	7.08 (+0.0)	6.96 (+0.4)	6.98 (+1.4)	x	x	7.10 (+1.0 m/s)	Guest
3rd place, bronze medalist(s)	Antonio Vermehudo	Portugal	7.07 (+1.0)	6.90 (+0.4)	x	6.84 (+1.4)	x	x	7.07 (+1.0 m/s)	
	Luis Azevedo	Portugal	x	7.02 (+1.6)	4.65 (+0.4)				7.02 (+1.6 m/s)	Guest
4	Angel Gagliano	Argentina	x	x	x	x	x	6.79 (+1.4)	6.79 (+1.4 m/s)	
5	Johnny Sterling	Costa Rica	x	5.63 (+1.4)	6.16 (+1.0)	6.09 (+1.2)	6.60 (+1.0)	6.64 (+0.4)	6.64 (+0.4 m/s)	

=== Triple jump ===
Final – 23 September

Rank	Name	Nationality	Attempts						Result	Notes
Rank	Name	Nationality	1	2	3	4	5	6	Result	Notes
1st place, gold medalist(s)	Lázaro Betancourt	Cuba	15.97 (+1.2)	x	16.04 (+0.6)	x	x	x	16.04 (+0.6 m/s)	
2nd place, silver medalist(s)	Alberto Santamaría	Spain	15.52 (+1.0)	15.77 (+1.0)	15.61 (+0.4)	15.59 (-0.7)	15.76 (+0.8)		15.77 (+1.0 m/s)	
3rd place, bronze medalist(s)	Luis Azevedo	Portugal	15.16 (+0.6)	x	x	x	15.51 (+0.6)	x	15.51 (+0.6 m/s)	
4	Angel Gagliano	Argentina	x	x	15.20 (+0.4)	x	15.48 (+1.2)	x	15.48 (+1.2 m/s)	

=== Shot put ===
Final – 23 September

Rank	Name	Nationality	Attempts						Result	Notes
Rank	Name	Nationality	1	2	3	4	5	6	Result	Notes
1st place, gold medalist(s)	Luis Delís	Cuba	16.79	17.41	17.52	x	x	18.69	18.69	
2nd place, silver medalist(s)	Martín Vara	Spain	15.38	16.74	x	16.64	17.19	x	17.19	
3rd place, bronze medalist(s)	Gerardo Carucci	Argentina	15.42	15.74	16.17	15.95	x	x	16.17	
4	Vital Silva	Portugal	x	x	x	13.70	x	13.74	13.74	

=== Discus throw ===
Final – 23 September

Rank	Name	Nationality	Attempts						Result	Notes
Rank	Name	Nationality	1	2	3	4	5	6	Result	Notes
1st place, gold medalist(s)	Luis Delís	Cuba	63.28	62.82	64.60	65.24	x	x	65.24	
2nd place, silver medalist(s)	Sinesio Garrachón	Spain	55.16	54.74	55.22	55.88	55.82	x	55.88	
	Ricardo Ballbé	Spain	52.94	54.04	49.30	52.74	x	x	54.04	Guest
3rd place, bronze medalist(s)	José Carlos Jacques	Brazil	51.54	51.74	47.54	47.52	x	x	51.74	
4	Claudio Escauriza	Paraguay	48.70	x	45.98	46.46	48.52	x	48.70	
5	Norberto Aimé	Argentina	48.40	46.06	45.86	46.14	45.76	45.88	48.40	

=== Hammer throw ===
Final – 24 September

Rank	Name	Nationality	Attempts						Result	Notes
Rank	Name	Nationality	1	2	3	4	5	6	Result	Notes
1st place, gold medalist(s)	Raúl Jimeno	Spain	68.50	68.10	67.32	69.36	68.68	x	69.36	
2nd place, silver medalist(s)	Genovevo Morejón	Cuba	62.48	65.28	64.70	x	x	-	65.28	
	Francisco Fuentes	Spain	62.16	-	63.44	62.60	61.52	63.30	63.44	Guest
	José Luis Velasco	Spain	57.06	57.82	x	58.22	x	58.66	58.66	Guest
3rd place, bronze medalist(s)	Daniel Gómez	Argentina	-	55.58	55.78	x	x	x	55.78	

=== Javelin throw ===
Final – 25 September

Rank	Name	Nationality	Attempts						Result	Notes
Rank	Name	Nationality	1	2	3	4	5	6	Result	Notes
1st place, gold medalist(s)	Juan Francisco Garmendia	Argentina	x	72.00	71.28	x	68.86	x	72.00	
2nd place, silver medalist(s)	Carlos Cunha	Portugal	68.50	67.90	62.66	69.84	64.66	69.94	69.94	
3rd place, bronze medalist(s)	Juan José Rosell	Spain	59.58	65.64	64.92	x	x	68.46	68.46	
	Salvador Primo	Spain	-	-	x	63.42	58.78	x	63.42	Guest
4	Claudio Escauriza	Paraguay	57.32	x	55.14	x	56.90	59.92	59.92	

=== 20 kilometers walk ===
Final – 24 September

Rank	Name	Nationality	Time	Notes
1st place, gold medalist(s)	Querubín Moreno	Colombia	1:31:02	
2nd place, silver medalist(s)	José Pinto	Portugal	1:31:03	
3rd place, bronze medalist(s)	Santiago Fonseca	Honduras	1:34:19	
4	Jorge Quiñones	Colombia	1:38:15	
	Jaime Vila	Spain	1:40:05	Guest
	Rafael Cobos	Spain	1:48:20	Guest
	Alberto Saladie	Spain	DNF	

=== 4 × 100 meters relay ===
Final – 25 September

Rank	Nation	Competitors	Time	Notes
1st place, gold medalist(s)	Spain	Juan José Prado; Juan Tolrá; Ángel Heras; Florencio Gascón	40.40	
2nd place, silver medalist(s)	Cuba	José Luis Isalgue; Ángel Bueno; Jaime Jefferson; Tomás González	40.45	
3rd place, bronze medalist(s)	Brazil	José Luíz Barbosa; Nelson dos Santos; Sérgio Menezes; Wellington da Nobrega	41.00	

=== 4 × 400 meters relay ===
Final – 25 September

Rank	Nation	Competitors	Time	Notes
1st place, gold medalist(s)	Cuba	Tomás González; Lázaro Martínez; Frank Montiéh; Julio Prado	3:07.05	
2nd place, silver medalist(s)	Brazil	Evaldo Rosa da Silva; José Luíz Barbosa; Nelson dos Santos; Sérgio Menezes	3:07.62	
3rd place, bronze medalist(s)	Spain	Manuel González; Benjamín González; José Alonso; Ángel Heras	3:08.17	
4	Portugal	José Carvalho; Alvaro Silva; Luis Cunha; Carlos Cabral	3:15.74	

== Women's results ==
=== 100 meters ===
Final – 23 September
Wind: +0.4 m/s

Rank	Name	Nationality	Time	Notes
1st place, gold medalist(s)	Esmeralda de Jesus Garcia	Brazil	11.67	
2nd place, silver medalist(s)	Luisa Ferrer	Cuba	11.74	
3rd place, bronze medalist(s)	Lourdes Valdor	Spain	12.07	
4	Adriana Pero	Argentina	12.21	
5	Dolores Vives	Spain	12.76	

=== 200 meters ===
Final – 25 September
Wind: +1.1 m/s

Rank	Name	Nationality	Time	Notes
1st place, gold medalist(s)	Luisa Ferrer	Cuba	23.84	
2nd place, silver medalist(s)	Virginia Gomes	Portugal	24.59	
3rd place, bronze medalist(s)	Adriana Pero	Argentina	24.79	
4	María José Martínez-Patiño	Spain	24.81	
	Blanca Lacambra	Spain	25.54	Guest

=== 400 meters ===
Final – 25 September

Rank	Name	Nationality	Time	Notes
1st place, gold medalist(s)	Ana Fidelia Quirot	Cuba	52.08	
2nd place, silver medalist(s)	Gregoria Ferrer	Spain	56.98	

=== 800 meters ===
Final – 24 September

Rank	Name	Nationality	Time	Notes
1st place, gold medalist(s)	Neri McKeen	Cuba	2:03.07	
2nd place, silver medalist(s)	Alejandra Ramos	Chile	2:03.17	
3rd place, bronze medalist(s)	Maite Zúñiga	Spain	2:05.41	
4	Albertina Machado	Portugal	2:08.51	

=== 1500 meters ===
Final – 25 September

Rank	Name	Nationality	Time	Notes
1st place, gold medalist(s)	Aurora Cunha	Portugal	4:15.55	
2nd place, silver medalist(s)	Alejandra Ramos	Chile	4:16.33	
3rd place, bronze medalist(s)	Gloria Pallé	Spain	4:17.66	
	Amelia Lorza	Spain	4:18.88	Guest
4	Eloína Kerr	Cuba	4:20.20	
	Albertina Machado	Portugal	4:20.44	Guest
5	Fabiola Rueda	Colombia	4:20.94	
	Mónica Regonesi	Chile	4:25.87	Guest
6	Ena Guevara	Peru	4:31.72	
7	Norma Franco	El Salvador	4:32.72	

=== 3000 meters ===
Final – 23 September

Rank	Name	Nationality	Time	Notes
1st place, gold medalist(s)	Aurora Cunha	Portugal	9:14.10	
2nd place, silver medalist(s)	Pilar Fernández	Spain	9:26.59	
3rd place, bronze medalist(s)	Fabiola Rueda	Colombia	9:27.59	
4	Ena Guevara	Peru	9:34.22	
5	Mónica Regonesi	Chile	9:35.51	
6	Norma Franco	El Salvador	9:56.21	

=== 100 meters hurdles ===
Final – 24 September
Wind: +1.7 m/s

Rank	Name	Nationality	Time	Notes
1st place, gold medalist(s)	Elida Aveillé	Cuba	13.29	
2nd place, silver medalist(s)	Beatriz Capotosto	Argentina	13.52	
3rd place, bronze medalist(s)	María José Martínez-Patiño	Spain	13.93	
4	Conceição Geremias	Brazil	14.69	
5	Leida Castro	Dominican Republic	15.37	

=== 400 meters hurdles ===
Final – 24 September

Rank	Name	Nationality	Time	Notes
1st place, gold medalist(s)	Conceição Geremias	Brazil	58.74	
2nd place, silver medalist(s)	Rosa Colorado	Spain	59.97	
3rd place, bronze medalist(s)	Alma Vázquez	Mexico	1:01.90	
	María Jesús Isla	Spain	1:02.49	Guest

=== High jump ===
Final – 24 September

Rank	Name	Nationality	Attempts										Result	Notes
Rank	Name	Nationality	1.55	1.60	1.63	1.66	1.69	1.72	1.75	1.77	1.80	1.83	Result	Notes
1st place, gold medalist(s)	Orlane dos Santos	Brazil	-	-	-	-	o	-	o	o	xxo	xxx	1.80	
2nd place, silver medalist(s)	Isabel Mozún	Spain	-	-	-	o	-	o	o	xxx			1.75	
3rd place, bronze medalist(s)	Hildelisa Despaigne	Cuba	-	-	o	xo	o	xo	o	xxx			1.75	
	Asunción Morté	Spain	-	-	-	o	-	o	-	xxx			1.72	Guest
4	Conceição Alves	Portugal	-	-	o	o	o	xxx					1.69	
5	Andrea Sassi	Uruguay	o	o	o	xxo	xo	xxx					1.69	

=== Long jump ===
Final – 24 September

Rank	Name	Nationality	Attempts						Result	Notes
Rank	Name	Nationality	1	2	3	4	5	6	Result	Notes
1st place, gold medalist(s)	Eloína Echevarría	Cuba	6.40 (+1.6)	x	6.49 (+1.9)	x	6.37 (+1.7)	6.36 (+1.0)	6.49 (+1.9 m/s)	
2nd place, silver medalist(s)	Ana Oliveira	Portugal	6.09 w (+2.1)	x	6.13 (+0.8)	x	x	x	6.13 (+0.8 m/s)	
	Olga Dalmau	Spain	5.94 (+0.8)	6.11 w (+2.1)	6.04 (+1.0)	-	x	x	6.11 w (+2.1 m/s)	Guest
3rd place, bronze medalist(s)	Estrella Roldán	Spain	x	6.01 (+0.4)	x	6.02 (+0.8)	6.01 (+0.6)	x	6.02 (+0.8 m/s)	
	Conceição Alves	Portugal	6.00 w (+2.7)	x	6.01 (+1.0)	5.94 (+1.9)	5.76 (+1.0)	5.84 (+1.0)	6.01 (+1.0 m/s)	Guest
4	Esmeralda de Jesus Garcia	Brazil	5.82 (+1.7)	5.97 (+1.0)	x	5.70 w (+2.1)	5.67 (+1.1)	5.66 (+1.4)	5.97 (+1.0 m/s)	

=== Shot put ===
Final – 24 September

Rank	Name	Nationality	Attempts						Result	Notes
Rank	Name	Nationality	1	2	3	4	5	6	Result	Notes
1st place, gold medalist(s)	Maritza Martén	Cuba	14.34	14.78	14.52	13.62	13.26	x	14.78	
2nd place, silver medalist(s)	Marinalva dos Santos	Brazil	14.66	14.74	13.48	13.88	14.34	13.98	14.74	
3rd place, bronze medalist(s)	Adilia Silverio	Portugal	12.52	12.90	13.02	13.02	12.84	13.34	13.34	
	Enriqueta Díaz	Spain	13.04	x	12.98	x	13.00	x	13.04	Guest
4	Cristina Carballo	Spain	x	x	12.70	12.38	12.68	12.68	12.70	

=== Discus throw ===
Final – 25 September

Rank	Name	Nationality	Attempts						Result	Notes
Rank	Name	Nationality	1	2	3	4	5	6	Result	Notes
1st place, gold medalist(s)	Maritza Martén	Cuba	x	52.32	58.76	x	56.22	56.50	58.76	
2nd place, silver medalist(s)	Odete Valentino Domingos	Brazil	45.48	x	46.98	x	x	x	46.98	
3rd place, bronze medalist(s)	Ángeles Barreiro	Spain	x	x	x	41.78	39.32	41.10	46.74	
	Carmen García	Spain	43.66	39.06	40.88	41.46	46.26	44.74	46.26	Guest
	Encarna Gambús	Spain	41.50	x	44.26	45.30	x	x	45.30	Guest
	Margarita Nadal	Spain	37.70	38.10	36.34	37.60	39.36	38.86	39.36	Guest
4	Leida Castro	Dominican Republic	33.70	x	x	38.28	x	x	38.28	

=== Javelin throw ===
Final – 23 September

Rank	Name	Nationality	Attempts						Result	Notes
Rank	Name	Nationality	1	2	3	4	5	6	Result	Notes
1st place, gold medalist(s)	María Caridad Colón	Cuba	55.98	56.04	57.60	x	52.06	51.84	57.60	
2nd place, silver medalist(s)	Teresinha Vaz	Portugal	42.32	41.82	x	x	x	47.56	47.56	
3rd place, bronze medalist(s)	Aurora Moreno	Spain	43.00	44.74	40.32	x	x	36.12	44.74	
	Conceição Alves	Portugal	37.66	39.36	x	x	x	x	39.36	Guest
4	Leida Castro	Dominican Republic	35.88	36.70	33.74	37.02	x	x	37.02	

=== 4 × 100 meters relay ===
Final – 25 September

Rank	Nation	Competitors	Time	Notes
1st place, gold medalist(s)	Spain	Ángela Domínguez; Elena Guisasola; Teresa Rioné; Lourdes Valdor	47.26	
2nd place, silver medalist(s)	Portugal	Ana Oliveira; Vera Lisa; Conceição Alves; Virginia Gomes	49.81	

=== 4 × 400 meters relay ===
Final – 25 September

Rank	Nation	Competitors	Time	Notes
1st place, gold medalist(s)	Cuba	Ana Fidelia Quirot; Mercedes Ileana Alvarez; Neri McKeen; Hildelisa Despaigne	3:38.94	
2nd place, silver medalist(s)	Spain	Gregoria Ferrer; Esther Lahoz; Blanca Lacambra; Maite Zúñiga	3:41.30	
