= 1983 Ibero-American Championships in Athletics =

I Ibero-American Championships
- Dates: 23–25 September
- Host city: Barcelona, Catalonia, Spain
- Venue: Estadi Serrahima
- Events: 37
- Participation: 143 athletes from 18 nations

The 1983 Ibero-American Championships (Spanish: I Campeonato Iberoamericano de Atletismo) was an athletics competition which was held at the Estadi Serrahima in Barcelona, Catalonia, Spain from 23 to 25 September 1983. A total of 37 events were contested, of which 22 by male and 15 by female athletes. It was the first edition of the Ibero-American Championships, although a precursor to the tournament, the Juegos Iberoamericanos (Ibero-American Games), had been held in 1960 and 1962. Eighteen countries participated, drawing from the 22 members of the Asociación Ibero-Americano de Atletismo (Ibero-American Athletics Association).

Cuba won the most gold medals with a total of nineteen, but it was Spain which had the largest overall haul, beating Cuba's 24 with a total of 33 medals. Brazil and Portugal, were the third and fourth most successful nations of the competition, although the latter won the largest number of silver medals (12) over the course of the three-day competition. The Ibero-American Championships succeeded in attracting a number of high-profile athletes from Ibero-American countries, thus beginning the history of the long-running championships.

Cuban athletes Luis Delís and Maritza Martén both doubled up to win the shot put and discus throw events for men and women, respectively. Aurora Cunha of Portugal took the victory in the women's 1500 metres and 3000 metres while Chile's Alejandra Ramos finished runner-up in both the 800 metres and 1500 m. Luisa Ferrer came close to a sprint double, but was beaten by Esmeralda de Jesus Garcia in the 100 metres. Two records from the championships were particularly long-lasting: Delís's discus record stood until the 2010 Ibero-American Championships and Domingo Ramón's mark in the 3000 metres steeplechase remains the championship record.

It was the only edition of the Championships to only allow one athlete per country in a given event. Some countries fielded more athletes but these were ineligible to win medals.

== Medal summary ==
=== Men ===
Event	Gold		Silver		Bronze	
100 metres	José Isalgué (CUB)	10.46	Nelson dos Santos (BRA)	10.54	Ángel Heras (ESP)	10.65
200 metres	Tomás González (CUB)	20.91	Ángel Heras (ESP)	21.09	Evaldo Rosa (BRA)	21.56
400 metres	Lázaro Martínez (CUB)	46.37	Sérgio Menezes (BRA)	47.28	Isidoro Hornillos (ESP)	48.12
800 metres	José Luis González (ESP)	1:49.11	Carlos Cabral (POR)	1:49.32	José Luíz Barbosa (BRA)	1:50.02
1500 metres	José Manuel Abascal (ESP)	3:51.66	Hélder de Jesus (POR)	3:54.49	Hugo Allan García (GUA)	4:05.93
5000 metres	Silvio Salazar (COL)	13:52.19	Ezequiel Canário (POR)	13:59.68	Cándido Alario (ESP)	14:24.85
10,000 metres	Antonio Prieto (ESP)	28:58.19	Fernando Miguel (POR)	30:58.12	William Aguirre (NCA)	32:02.42
110 metre hurdles †	Ángel Bueno (CUB)	13.81	Wellington da Nobrega (BRA)	14.33	Rodrigo Casar (MEX)	14.35
400 metre hurdles	José Alonso (ESP)	50.08	Frank Montiéh (CUB)	50.81	Ricardo Biojo (COL)	52.95
3000 metre steeplechase	Domingo Ramón (ESP)	8:27.20	Emilio Ulloa (CHI)	8:37.36	Adauto Domingues (BRA)	8:40.17
4 × 100 m relay	Spain (ESP); Juan José Prado; Juan Tolrá; Ángel Heras; Florencio Gascón	40.40	Cuba (CUB); José Luis Isalgue; Ángel Bueno; Jaime Jefferson; Tomás Pedro González	40.45	Brazil (BRA); José Luíz Barbosa; Nelson Rocha Dos Santos; Sergio Mathias Franco de Meneses; Wellington Araújo	41.00
4 × 400 m relay	Cuba (CUB); Tomás Pedro González; Lázaro Martínez; Frank Montiéh; Julio Osvaldo Prado	3:07.05	Brazil (BRA); Evaldo Rosa da Silva; José Luíz Barbosa; Nelson Rocha Dos Santos; Sergio Mathias Franco de Meneses	3:07.62	Spain (ESP); Manuel González; Benjamin González; José Alonso; Ángel Heras	3:08.17
Marathon	Roberto García (ESP)	2:24:32	Oscar Santos (POR)	2:33:41	Carlos Orué (ARG)	2:38:49
20 km walk	Héctor Moreno (COL)	1:31:02	José Pinto (POR)	1:31:03	Santiago Fonseca (HON)	1:34:19
High jump	Jorge Alfaro (CUB)	2.20 m	Roberto Cabrejas (ESP)	2.16 m	Vítor Mendes (POR)	2.12 m
Pole vault	Alberto Ruiz (ESP)	5.20 m	Manuel Miguel (POR)	4.50 m	Claudio Escauriza (PAR)	4.30 m
Long jump	Jaime Jefferson (CUB)	7.93 m	Antonio Corgos (ESP)	7.90 m	António Vermelhudo (POR)	7.07 m
Triple jump	Lázaro Betancourt (CUB)	16.04 m	Alberto Santamaría (ESP)	15.77 m	Luís Azevedo (POR)	15.51 m
Shot put	Luis Delís (CUB)	18.69 m	Martín Vara (ESP)	17.19 m	Gerardo Carucci (ARG)	16.17 m
Discus throw	Luis Delís (CUB)	65.24 m	Sinesio Garrachón (ESP)	55.88 m	José Jacques (BRA)	51.74 m
Hammer throw	Raúl Jimeno (ESP)	69.36 m	Genovevo Morejón (CUB)	65.28 m	Daniel Gómez (ARG)	55.78 m
Javelin throw (Old model)	Angel Garmendia (ARG)	72.00 m	Carlos Cunha (POR)	69.94 m	Juan Rosell (ESP)	68.46 m

- † The 110 metres hurdles competition was won by Carlos Sala of Spain in 13.74 seconds, but he was competing as a "guest" athlete.

=== Women ===
Event	Gold		Silver		Bronze	
100 metres	Esmeralda de Jesus Garcia (BRA)	11.67	Luisa Ferrer (CUB)	11.74	Lourdes Valdor (ESP)	12.07
200 metres	Luisa Ferrer (CUB)	23.84	Virgínia Gomes (POR)	24.59	Adriana Pero (ARG)	24.79
400 metres	Ana Fidelia Quirot (CUB)	52.08	Gregoria Ferrer (ESP)	56.98	Only two competitors	
800 metres	Nery McKeen (CUB)	2:03.07	Alejandra Ramos (CHI)	2:03.17	Maite Zúñiga (ESP)	2:05.41
1500 metres	Aurora Cunha (POR)	4:15.55	Alejandra Ramos (CHI)	4:16.33	Gloria Pallé (ESP)	4:17.66
3000 metres	Aurora Cunha (POR)	9:14.10	Pilar Fernández (ESP)	9:26.59	Fabiola Rueda (COL)	9:27.84
100 metre hurdles	Elida Aveillé (CUB)	13.29	Beatriz Capotosto (ARG)	13.52	María José Martínez-Patiño (ESP)	13.93
400 metre hurdles	Conceição Geremias (BRA)	58.74	Rosa Colorado (ESP)	59.97	Alma Vázquez (MEX)	61.90
4 × 100 metre relay	Spain (ESP); Angela Dominguez; Elena Guisasola; Teresa Rioné; Lourdes Valdor	47.26	Portugal (POR); Ana Oliveira; Vera Lisa; Conceição Alves; Virginia Gomes	49.81	Only two teams	
4 × 400 metre relay	Cuba (CUB); Ana Fidelia Quirot; Mercedes Ileana Alvarez; Neri McKeen; Hildelisa Despaigne	3:38.94	Spain (ESP); Gregoria Ferrer; Esther Lahoz; Blanca Lacambra; Maite Zúñiga	3:41.30	Only two teams	
High jump	Orlane dos Santos (BRA)	1.80 m	Isabel Mozún (ESP)	1.75 m	Victoria Despaigne (CUB)	1.75 m
Long jump	Eloína Echevarría (CUB)	6.49 m	Ana Oliveira (POR)	6.13 m	Estrella Roldán (ESP)	6.02 m
Shot put	Maritza Martén (CUB)	14.78 m	Marinalva dos Santos (BRA)	14.74 m	Adília Silvério (POR)	13.34 m
Discus throw	Maritza Martén (CUB)	58.76 m	Odete Domingos (BRA)	46.98 m	Ángeles Barreiro (ESP)	46.74 m
Javelin throw (Old model)	María Caridad Colón (CUB)	57.60 m	Teresinha Vaz (POR)	47.56 m	Aurora Moreno (ESP)	44.74 m

== Medal table ==
* Host nation (Spain)

Rank	Nation	Gold	Silver	Bronze	Total
1	Cuba (CUB)	19	4	1	24
2	Spain (ESP)*	10	11	12	33
3	Brazil (BRA)	3	6	5	14
4	Portugal (POR)	2	12	4	18
5	Colombia (COL)	2	0	2	4
6	Argentina (ARG)	1	1	4	6
7	Chile (CHI)	0	3	0	3
8	Mexico (MEX)	0	0	2	2
9	Guatemala (GUA)	0	0	1	1
9	Honduras (HON)	0	0	1	1
9	Nicaragua (NCA)	0	0	1	1
9	Paraguay (PAR)	0	0	1	1
Totals (12 entries)		37	37	34	108

- Note: The women's 400 metres medals (gold for Cuba, silver for Spain) were excluded in the official competition medal count.

== Participation ==
Of the twenty-two founding members of the Asociación Iberoamericana de Atletismo, eighteen presented delegations for the inaugural championships. The four absent member countries were Ecuador, Panama, Puerto Rico and Venezuela. A total of 143 athletes participated in the first edition. Including a number of guests, 163 participating athletes were counted by analysing the official result list.

- Argentina (10)
- Bolivia (1)
- Brazil (12)
- Chile (3)
- Colombia (6)
- Costa Rica (1)
- Cuba (21)
- Dominican Republic (1)
- El Salvador (1)
- Guatemala (1)
- Honduras (1)
- Mexico (2)
- Nicaragua (1)
- Paraguay (1)
- Peru (1)
- Portugal (27)
- Spain (72)
- Uruguay (1)
