= Antonio Campos =

Antonio Campos may refer to:

- António Campos (1922–1999), Portuguese visual ethnographer
- Antonio Campos (athlete) (born 1951), Spanish Olympic athlete
- Antonio Campos (director) (born 1983), American film producer and director
- Tony Campos (Antonio Campos, born 1973), American heavy metal bassist and vocalist
