= Tomás González (sprinter) =

Cuban sprinter (born 1959)

Personal information
- Born: June 11, 1959 (age 67) Bejucal, Cuba

Sport
- Sport: Track and field

Tomás Pedro González Barrios (born June 11, 1959) is a retired track and field sprinter from Cuba. He represented his country at the 1980 Summer Olympics, competing in the 100 metres, 200 metres and the 4 × 100 metres relay. He won several sprint medals at the Central American and Caribbean Championships in Athletics and was the gold medallist over 200 m at the 1983 Ibero-American Championships in Athletics.

== International competitions ==
Year	Competition	Venue	Position	Event	Notes
Representing Cuba
1979	Central American and Caribbean Championships	Guadalajara, Mexico	3rd	200 m	21.45A
1980	Olympic Games	Moscow, Soviet Union	7th (q-finals)	100 m	10.44
1980	Olympic Games	Moscow, Soviet Union	8th (q-finals)	200 m	21.19
1980	Olympic Games	Moscow, Soviet Union	—	4 × 100 m relay	DNF
1983	Central American and Caribbean Championships	Havana, Cuba	2nd	100 m	10.37
1983	Central American and Caribbean Championships	Havana, Cuba	2nd	200 m	20.96
1983	Central American and Caribbean Championships	Havana, Cuba	1st	4 × 100 m relay	39.81
1983	Pan American Games	Caracas, Venezuela	4th	200 m	20.85
1983	Ibero-American Championships	Barcelona, Spain	1st	200 m	20.91 (wind: +0.1 m/s)
1983	Ibero-American Championships	Barcelona, Spain	2nd	4 × 100 m relay	40.45
1983	Ibero-American Championships	Barcelona, Spain	1st	4 × 400 m relay	3:07.05
1984	Friendship Games	Moscow, Soviet Union	7th	200 m	20.80
1984	Friendship Games	Moscow, Soviet Union	2nd	4 × 100 m relay	38.79 s
