= Luisa Ferrer =

Cuban track and field athlete (born 1962)

Personal information
- Nationality: Cuban
- Born: 4 January 1962 (age 64)

Sport
- Country: Cuba
- Sport: Athletics
Medal record
Athletics
Representing Cuba
Central American and Caribbean Championships in Athletics
Silver medal – second place	1981 Dominican Republic	200m
Bronze medal – third place	1981 Dominican Republic	100m
Gold medal – first place	1983 Havana	100m
Gold medal – first place	1983 Havana	200m
Central American and Caribbean Games
Gold medal – first place	1982 Havana	100m
Gold medal – first place	1982 Havana	200m
Bronze medal – third place	1982 Havana	4×100m
Gold medal – first place	1986 Dominican Republic	4×100m relay
Ibero-American Championships in Athletics
Gold medal – first place	1983 Barcelona	200m
Silver medal – second place	1983 Barcelona	100m
Bronze medal – third place	1986 Havana	4×100m relay
Pan American Games
Bronze medal – third place	1983 Caracas	100m
Bronze medal – third place	1983 Caracas	200m

Luisa Ferrer (born 4 January 1962) is a Cuban female former track and field athlete. She competed in several notable competitive events during her career including the Central American and Caribbean Championships in Athletics, Central American and Caribbean Games, Pan American Games and Ibero-American Championships.

== Career ==
She rose to prominence in Athletics after claiming a silver medal in the women's 100m and a bronze medal in the 200m track events during the 1981 Central American and Caribbean Championships in Athletics.

Luisa Ferrer also claimed two gold medals in the women's 100m, 200m events and a bronze medal in the women's 4 × 100 m relay event at the 1982 Central American and Caribbean Games, the event which was held in Cuba.
