= Cerrada =

Cerrada is a surname. Notable people with the surname include:

- Fernando Cerrada (born 1954), Spanish long-distance runner
- Jonatan Cerrada (born 1985), Moreno, Belgian singer
