= Claudio Escauriza =

Paraguayan decathlete

Claudio Escauriza (born 3 May 1958 in Paraguay) is a Paraguayan athletics coach and former decathlete, who competed at the 1984 Summer Olympics in Los Angeles, United States of America and the 1st IAAF World Championships in 1983 in Helsinki, Finland. Escauriza represented Paraguay at several South American Championships, and also holds the Paraguayan national record in decathlon with a score of 6,943. He was the coach of Paraguayan Javelin Thrower Fabian Jara. Escauriza is the father of Paraguayan tennis player Lara Escauriza.

== Trajectory ==
Escuariza finished 2nd at the 1982 Southern Cross Games in Argentina.

== Coaching ==
Escauriza and Édgar Torres both attended the 2012 Summer Olympics as coaches of the group.

At the 2013 South American Championships in Cartagena, Colombia, Escauriza was part of the coaching body with Plinio Penzzi and Hungarian Thomas Zuddy.

== Personal life ==
In 2009, Escauriza, along with José Luis Chilavert, Tomás Orué and lawyer Alejandro Rubin, attended a Press Conference at Asunción Shopping Centre Shopping del Sol, in support of Edgar Baumann, who had received a favorable ruling from the Paraguay Supreme Court in a case against the Paraguay Olympic Committee president Ramón Zubizarreta for robbing him the right of competing at the 2000 Summer Olympics and also taking his sums of money that he earned from his scholarship.

== International competitions ==
Year	Competition	Venue	Position	Event	Notes
Representing Paraguay
1977	South American Championships	Montevideo, Uruguay	6th	Pole vault	3.60 m
1977	South American Championships	Montevideo, Uruguay	5th	Javelin throw	60.44 m
1977	South American Championships	Montevideo, Uruguay	8th	Decathlon	5658 pts
1979	South American Championships	Bucaramanga, Colombia	3rd	Decathlon	6791 pts
1981	South American Championships	La Paz, Bolivia	5th	Discus throw	44.82 m
1981	South American Championships	La Paz, Bolivia	8th	Javelin throw	52.14 m
1981	South American Championships	La Paz, Bolivia	2nd	Decathlon	6702 pts
1982	Southern Cross Games	Santa Fe, Argentina	5th	Discus throw	44.14 m
1982	Southern Cross Games	Santa Fe, Argentina	2nd	Decathlon	6774 pts
1983	World Championships	Helsinki, Finland	–	Decathlon	DNF
1983	Ibero-American Championships	Barcelona, Spain	3rd	Pole vault	4.30 m
1983	Ibero-American Championships	Barcelona, Spain	4th	Discus throw	48.70 m
1983	Ibero-American Championships	Barcelona, Spain	4th	Javelin throw	59.92 m
1984	Olympic Games	Los Angeles, United States	22nd	Decathlon	6546 pts
1985	South American Championships	Santiago, Chile	8th	Javelin throw	58.86 m
1985	South American Championships	Santiago, Chile	3rd	Decathlon	6599 pts

== See also ==
- List of Paraguayan records in athletics
