= Carlos Pérez (runner) =

Spanish long-distance runner (born 1935)

Personal information
- Full name: Carlos Pérez Alonso
- Nationality: Spanish
- Born: 1 June 1935 (age 91) Vigo, Spain

Sport
- Sport: Long-distance running
- Event: Marathon
Medal record
Men's Athletics
Representing Spain
Ibero-American Games
Bronze medal – third place	1960 Santiago	10,000 metres

Carlos Pérez Alonso (born 1 June 1935) is a Spanish long-distance runner. He competed in the marathon at the 1968 Summer Olympics and the 1972 Summer Olympics.
