= Tomás Barris =

Spanish middle-distance runner (1930–2023)

Personal information
- Full name: Tomás Barris Ballestín
- Born: 1 February 1930 Barcelona, Spain
- Died: 29 October 2023 (aged 93) Barcelona, Spain
- Occupation: Spanish middle-distance runner
- Height: 1.71 m (5 ft 7 in)
- Weight: 67 kg (148 lb)

Sport
- Club: FC Barcelona
Medal record
Men's Athletics
Representing Spain
Ibero-American Games
Silver medal – second place	1960 Santiago	800 m
Silver medal – second place	1960 Santiago	1500 m

Tomás Barris Ballestín (1 February 1930 – 29 October 2023) was a Spanish middle distance runner who competed in the 1960 Summer Olympics. Barris died on 29 October 2023, at the age of 93.

== Personal bests ==
- 1500 metres – 3:41.7h (1958)
