= Roberto Cabrejas =

Spanish high jumper (1952–2001)

Personal information
- Born: 28 December 1952 (age 73) Rabanera del Pinar, Spain
- Died: 4 July 2001 (aged 48) Barcelona, Spain
- Height: 1.81 m (5 ft 11 in)
- Weight: 70 kg (154 lb)

Sport
- Sport: Athletics
- Event: High jump
- Club: Tolosa CF

Roberto Cabrejas Cuadrado (28 December 1952 – 4 July 2001) was a Spanish athlete who specialised in the high jump. He won a silver medal at the 1983 Ibero-American Championships. In addition, he represented his country at the 1980 Summer Olympics and 1983 World Championships.

His personal bests in the event were 2.26 metres outdoors (Madrid 1983) and 2.22 metres indoors (Milan 1982). After retirement, he worked as a coach and was appointed head of the technical committee of high jump by the Catalan Federation of Athleticism. Cabrejas died on 4 July 2001 when the motorbike he was riding on was hit by a car in Barcelona.

== International competitions ==
Year	Competition	Venue	Position	Notes
Representintg Spain
1977	European Indoor Championships	San Sebastián, Spain	18th	2.10 m
1980	Olympic Games	Moscow, Soviet Union	16th	2.10 m
1982	European Indoor Championships	Milan, Italy	7th	2.22 m
1982	European Championships	Athens, Greece	13th (h)	2.18 m
1983	European Indoor Championships	Budapest, Hungary	–	NM
1983	Mediterranean Games	Casablanca, Morocco	7th	2.13 m
1983	Ibero-American Championships	Barcelona, Spain	2nd	2.16 m
1983	World Championships	Helsinki, Finland	23rd (q)	2.15 m
