= Moisés Campeny =

Spanish hammer thrower (born 1979)

Moisés Campeny Brugue (born 27 May 1979 in Riudellots de la Selva) is a retired Spanish athlete who specialised in the hammer throw.
