= Eva Paniagua =

Spanish hurdler

Personal information
- Nationality: Spanish
- Born: 2 February 1974 (age 52)

Sport
- Sport: Track and field
- Event: 400 metres hurdles

Eva Paniagua (born 2 February 1974) is a Spanish hurdler. She competed in the women's 400 metres hurdles at the 1996 Summer Olympics.
