= Estela Estévez =

Spanish middle-distance runner

Personal information
- Nationality: Spanish
- Born: 24 February 1965 (age 61) Vigo, Spain
- Height: 1.61 m (5 ft 3 in)
- Weight: 47 kg (104 lb) (1992)

Sport
- Sport: Track and field
- Event(s): 1500 metres, 3000 metres
- Club: Real Club Celta de Atletismo, Comesaña Sporting Club

Maria Estela Estévez Barreiro (born 24 February 1965 in Vigo) is a retired Spanish athlete who competed in middle-distance events and the cross-country. She represented her country at the 1992 Summer Olympics as well as two World Championships.

== Competition record ==
Year	Competition	Venue	Position	Event	Notes
Representing Spain
1988	Ibero-American Championships	Mexico City, Mexico	1st	3000 m	9:46.35
1989	World Cup	Barcelona, Spain	6th	3000 m	9:08.17
1990	European Championships	Split, Yugoslavia	17th (h)	3000 m	9:05.25
1990	Ibero-American Championships	Manaus, Brazil	2nd	1500 m	4:13.96
1991	World Championships	Tokyo, Japan	25th (h)	1500 m	4:13.93
1992	Ibero-American Championships	Seville, Spain	2nd	1500 m	4:18.40
1992	Olympic Games	Barcelona, Spain	19th (h)	3000 m	8:55.70
1993	Mediterranean Games	Narbonne, France	5th	3000 m	9:06.06
1993	World Championships	Stuttgart, Germany	28th (h)	3000 m	9:08.04
1994	European Championships	Helsinki, Finland	23rd (h)	3000 m	9:03.02

== Personal bests ==
Outdoor

- 1500 metres – 4:13.93 (Tokyo 1991)
- 3000 metres – 8:56.81 (Nice 1993)
- 5000 metres – 15:43.86 (Seville 1990)
