= Marta Míguez =

Spanish javelin thrower

Marta Míguez Telle (born March 3, 1973, in Louredo Cortegado, Ourense) is a retired female javelin thrower from Spain. She set her personal best (59.43 metres) on July 21, 2001, in Valencia, Spain.

== Achievements ==
Year	Competition	Venue	Position	Notes
Representing Spain
1997	Mediterranean Games	Bari, Italy	4th	55.16 m
2000	Olympic Games	Sydney, Australia	25th	55.52 m
2001	Mediterranean Games	Radès, Tunisia	3rd	55.19 m
2002	Ibero-American Championships	Guatemala City, Guatemala	3rd	58.06 m
2002	World Cup	Madrid, Spain	7th	55.97 m
