= Ibero-American Championships in Athletics =

Biennial athletics competition for athletes

Ibero-America

The Ibero-American Championships in Athletics (Spanish: Campeonato Iberoamericano de Atletismo) is a biennial athletics competition for athletes representing Ibero-American countries as well as a number of other Spanish- or Portuguese-speaking countries in Africa. The competition is organised by the Asociación Iberoamericana de Atletismo (Ibero-American Athletics Association).

The idea of such a competition first came about in 1982 when the Asociación Iberoamericana de Atletismo (AIA) was officially formed in Madrid with 22 countries as signatories. Following official sanctioning by the International Association of Athletics Federations (IAAF), the AIA established the Ibero-American Championships which first took place in Barcelona, Spain in 1983.

== Ibero-American Games ==
The Ibero American Games (Spanish: Juegos Iberoamericanos) was a precursor to the regional championships and was held twice, first in 1960 and finally in 1962.

Edition	Year	City	Country	Date	Venue	Nations	Athletes	Events
I	1960	Santiago	Chile	11–16 October	Estadio Nacional	15	275	31
II	1962	Madrid	Spain	7–12 October	Estadio de Vallehermoso	17	265	31

== Editions ==
Edition	Year	City	Country	Date	Venue	Nations	Athletes	Events
1	1983	Barcelona	Spain	23–25 September	Estadi Municipal Joan Serrahima	18	143	37
2	1986	Havana	Cuba	27–28 September	Estadio Pedro Marrero	19	220	36
3	1988	Mexico City	Mexico	22–24 July	Estadio Olímpico Universitario	19	371	40
4	1990	Manaus	Brazil	14–16 September	Vila Olímpica	14	205	40
5	1992	Seville	Spain	17–19 July	Estadio Olímpico de Sevilla	22	462	41
6	1994	Mar del Plata	Argentina	27–30 October	Estadio Municipal Teodoro Bronzini	20	346	42
7	1996	Medellín	Colombia	29–30 May	Estadio Alfonso Galvis Duque	19	352	42
8	1998	Lisbon	Portugal	17–19 July	Estádio Universitário de Lisboa	22	337	43
9	2000	Rio de Janeiro	Brazil	20–21 May	Estádio Célio de Barros	20	297	44
10	2002	Guatemala City	Guatemala	11–12 May	Estadio Cementos Progreso	21	312	44
11	2004	Huelva	Spain	7–8 August	Estadio Iberoamericano	27	443	44
12	2006	Ponce	Puerto Rico	26–28 May	Francisco Montaner Stadium	23	313	44
13	2008	Iquique	Chile	13–15 June	Estadio Tierra de Campeones	19	316	44
14	2010	San Fernando	Spain	4–6 June	Estadio Municipal Bahía Sur	29	449	44
15	2012	Barquisimeto	Venezuela	8–10 June	Polideportivo Máximo Viloria	24	362	44
16	2014	São Paulo	Brazil	1–3 August	Estádio Ícaro de Castro Melo	24	353	44
17	2016	Rio de Janeiro	Brazil	14–16 May	Estádio Olímpico João Havelange	28	355	44
18	2018	Trujillo	Peru	24–26 August	Estadio Chan Chan	18	354	44
–	2020	Santa Cruz de Tenerife	Spain	cancelled	Centro Insular de Atletismo de Tenerife			
19	2022	La Nucía/Torrevieja	Spain	20–22 May	Estadi Olímpic Camilo Cano	23	395	44
20	2024	Cuiabá	Brazil	10–12 May	Centro de Treinamento Olímpico	23	426	47
21	2026	Lima	Peru	29–31 May	Villa Deportiva Nacional	20	381	46

== Medal table (1983–2018) ==
Rank	Nation	Gold	Silver	Bronze	Total
1	Brazil	205	197	180	582
2	Cuba	163	90	52	305
3	Spain	115	135	126	376
4	Colombia	62	52	62	176
5	Mexico	47	52	39	138
6	Argentina	42	45	63	150
7	Portugal	31	51	53	135
8	Chile	25	29	34	88
9	Venezuela	13	22	26	61
10	Puerto Rico	12	25	29	66
11	Ecuador	12	16	21	49
12	Dominican Republic	12	9	13	34
13	Peru	10	6	18	34
14	Uruguay	7	9	12	28
15	Paraguay	2	5	7	14
16	Costa Rica	2	5	4	11
17	Panama	2	3	0	5
18	Bolivia	0	5	4	9
19	Guatemala	0	3	3	6
20	Honduras	0	1	2	3
21	São Tomé and Príncipe	0	1	0	1
22	Angola	0	0	1	1
22	Mozambique	0	0	1	1
22	Nicaragua	0	0	1	1
Totals (24 entries)		762	761	751	2,274

== Championship records ==
Key: Defunct event

=== Men ===
Event	Record	Athlete	Nationality	Date	Championship	Place	Ref.
100 m	10.00 A (+1.6 m/s)	Robson da Silva	Brazil	22 July 1988	1988 Championships	Mexico City, Mexico	
200 m	20.05 A (−0.3 m/s)	Robson da Silva	Brazil	23 July 1988	1988 Championships	Mexico City, Mexico	
400 m	44.44 A	Roberto Hernández	Cuba	22 July 1988	1988 Championships	Mexico City, Mexico	
800 m	1:44.77	Rafith Rodríguez	Colombia	2 August 2014	São Paulo 2014		
1500 m	3:37.34	Sergio Gallardo	Spain	2004	Huelva 2004		
3000 m	7:51.25	Hudson de Souza	Brazil	2004	Huelva 2004		
5000 m	13:32.48	Ayad Lamdassem	Spain	2010	San Fernando 2010		
10,000 m	28:06.88	Armando Quintanilla	Mexico	1994	Mar del Plata 1994		
10 km (road)	29:41	Ilias Fifa	Spain	12 May 2024	2024 Championships	Cuiabá, Brazil	
Marathon	2:14:27	Rodrigo Gavela	Spain	1992	Seville 1992		
110 m hurdles	13.39	Anier García	Cuba	1996	Medellín 1996		
400 m hurdles	48.65	Andrés Silva	Uruguay	1 August 2014	São Paulo 2014		
3000 m steeplechase	8:27.20	Domingo Ramón	Spain	1983	Barcelona 1983		
High jump	2.35 m A	Javier Sotomayor	Cuba	1988	1988 Championships	Mexico City, Mexico	
Pole vault	5.70 m	Germán Chiaraviglio	Argentina	2006	Ponce 2006		
Long jump	8.53 m	Iván Pedroso	Cuba	1992	Seville 1992		
Triple jump	17.31 m (+0.7 m/s)	Almir dos Santos	Brazil	12 May 2024	2024 Championships	Cuiabá, Brazil	
Shot put	21.70 m	Darlan Romani	Brazil	22 May 2022	La Nucia 2022		
Discus throw	65.24 m	Luis Delís	Cuba	1983	Barcelona 1983		
Hammer throw	76.18 m	Alberto Sánchez	Cuba	1998	Lisbon 1998		
Javelin throw	85.11 m	Pedro Henrique Rodrigues	Brazil	12 May 2024	2024 Championships	Cuiabá, Brazil	
Decathlon	7940 pts	David Gómez	Spain	2004	Huelva 2004		
Decathlon	100m / Long jump / Shot put / High jump / 400m / 110m H / Discus / Pole vault / Javelin / 1500m; 11.03 / 7.40 m / 14.19 m / 1.90 m / 48.60 / 14.33 / 40.83 m / 4.40 m / 62.53 m / 4:33.44						
10,000 m walk (track)	39:24.20	Álvaro Martín	Spain	21 May 2022	La Nucia 2022		
20,000 m walk (track)	1:26:12.1	James Rendón	Colombia	10 June 2012	Barquisimeto 2012		
20 km walk (road)	1:21:20	Daniel García	Mexico	1994	Mar del Plata 1994		
4 × 100 m relay	38.24	Vicente de Lima; Édson Ribeiro; André da Silva; Claudinei da Silva	Brazil	2000	Rio de Janeiro 2000		
4 × 400 m relay	2:59.71 A	Lázaro Martínez; Jorge Valentin; Félix Stevens; Roberto Hernández	Cuba	1988	1988 Championships	Mexico City, Mexico	

=== Women ===
Event	Record	Athlete	Nationality	Date	Championship	Place	Ref.
100 m	11.08 (+0.7 m/s)	Ana Carolina Azevedo	Brazil	29 May 2026	2026 Championships	Lima, Peru	
200 m	22.80 (+1.9 m/s)	Roxana Díaz	Cuba	12 May 2002	Guatemala City 2002		
400 m	49.49	Marileidy Paulino	Dominican Republic	21 May 2022	La Nucia 2022		
800 m	2:00.23	Ana Fidelia Quirot	Cuba	1986	Havana 1986		
1500 m	4:05.71	Nuria Fernández	Spain	2010	San Fernando 2010		
3000 m	8:46.59	Jéssica Augusto	Portugal	2010	San Fernando 2010		
5000 m	15:27.53	Fernanda Ribeiro	Portugal	2004	Huelva 2004		
10,000 m	32:49.80	María Luisa Larraga	Spain	1998	Lisbon 1998		
10 km (road)	34:25	Mary Granja	Ecuador	12 May 2024	2024 Championships	Cuiabá, Brazil	
Half marathon	1:11:59	Florencia Borelli	Argentina	22 May 2022	La Nucia 2022		
Marathon	2:39:10	Ana Isabel Alonso	Spain	1992	Seville 1992		
100 m hurdles	12.68 (+1.1 m/s)	Vitória Alves	Brazil	30 May 2026	2026 Championships	Lima, Peru	
400 m hurdles	54.84	Daimí Pernía	Cuba	2004	Huelva 2004		
3000 m steeplechase	9:29.60	Belén Casetta	Argentina	21 May 2022	La Nucia 2022		
High jump	1.98 m	Ioamnet Quintero	Cuba	1992	Seville 1992		
Pole vault	4.85 m	Fabiana Murer	Brazil	2010	San Fernando 2010		
Long jump	6.97 m	Maurren Maggi	Brazil	2002	Guatemala City 2002		
Triple jump	14.51 m	Yusmay Bicet	Cuba	2004	Huelva 2004		
Shot put	19.97 m	Yumileidi Cumbá	Cuba	2004	Huelva 2004		
Discus throw	67.46 m	Hilda Elisa Ramos	Cuba	1992	Seville 1992		
Hammer throw	71.76 m	Rosa Rodriguez	Venezuela	8 June 2012	Barquisimeto 2012		
Javelin throw	66.99 m	Osleidys Menéndez	Cuba	2004	Huelva 2004		
Heptathlon	6274 pts	Martha Araújo	Colombia	11–12 May 2024	2024 Championships	Cuiabá, Brazil	
Heptathlon	100m H / High jump / Shot put / 200m / Long jump / Javelin / 800m; 12.91 (+1.2 m/s) / 1.64 m / 13.82 m / 24.23 (+0.5 m/s) / 6.32 m (−0.8 m/s) / 48.61 m / 2:19.54						
10,000 m walk (track)	42:02.99	Sandra Arenas	Colombia	25 August 2018	Trujillo 2018		
20 km walk (road)	1:32:46	Evelyn Inga	Peru	11 May 2024	2024 Championships	Cuiabá, Brazil	
4 × 100 m relay	42.92	Vanusa dos Santos; Ana Cláudia Lemos Silva; Franciela Krasucki; Rosângela Santos	Brazil	3 August 2014	São Paulo 2014		
4 × 400 m relay	3:28.60	Geisa Coutinho; Josiane Tito; Lucimar Teodoro; Maria Laura Almirao	Brazil	2004	Huelva 2004		

=== Mixed ===
Event	Record	Athlete	Nationality	Date	Championship	Place	Ref.
4 × 400 m relay	3:17.85	Vitor de Miranda; Maria de Sena; Tiago da Silva; Letícia Lima	Brazil	10 May 2024	2024 Championships	Cuiabá, Brazil	

== Ibero-American Marathon/Half Marathon Championships ==
Sometimes, Ibero-American Marathon or Half Marathon Championships were held separately from the regular championships.

Year	Event	City	Country	Date
1986	Marathon	Sevilla	Spain	February 2
1992	Marathon	Barcelona	Spain	March 24
1997	Marathon	Rio de Janeiro	Brazil	March 13
1999	Marathon	Cancún	(Mexico) México	December 12
2001	Half marathon	Montevideo	Uruguay	September 23
2003	Half marathon (18.2 km)	Buenos Aires	Argentina	September 28
2005	Half marathon	Maracaibo	Venezuela	September 5
2011	Marathon	Caracas	Venezuela	February 20

== See also ==
- Ibero-American U18 Championships in Athletics
- Ibero-American U20 Championships in Athletics
- Ibero-American Championships in Weightlifting
- Ibero-American Go Federation, for Ibero-America
- Central American and Caribbean Championships
- Athletics at the Lusophony Games
- Jeux de la Francophonie
- South American Championships in Athletics
- Iberian 10,000 Metres Championships
