= Santiago Manguán =

Spanish long-distance runner (1941–2022)

Personal information
- Nationality: Spanish
- Born: 25 July 1941 Caleruega, Spain
- Died: 30 January 2022 (aged 80) Burgos, Spain

Sport
- Sport: Long-distance running
- Event: Marathon

Santiago Manguán (25 July 1941 – 30 January 2022) was a Spanish long-distance runner. He competed in the marathon at the 1976 Summer Olympics. Manguán died in Burgos on 30 January 2022, at the age of 80.
