= José Luis Falcón =

Spanish hammer thrower

Personal information
- Nationality: Spanish
- Born: 19 July 1938 (age 87) Oiartzun, Spain

Sport
- Sport: Athletics
- Event: Hammer throw

José Luis Falcón (born 19 July 1938) is a Spanish athlete. He competed in the men's hammer throw at the 1960 Summer Olympics.
