= Alfonso de Andrés =

Spanish javelin thrower

Personal information
- Nationality: Spanish
- Born: 16 May 1938 Novillas, Spain
- Died: 5 July 2009 (aged 71) Madrid, Spain

Sport
- Sport: Athletics
- Event: Javelin throw
Medal record
Representing Spain
Mediterranean Games
Silver medal – second place	1967 Tunis	Javelin throw

Alfonso Carlos de Andrés Asin (16 May 1938 – 5 July 2009) was a Spanish athlete. He competed in the men's javelin throw at the 1960 Summer Olympics.
