= Francisco Martín =

Spanish high jumper

Personal information
- Nationality: Spanish
- Born: 1 February 1955 (age 71) Granada, Spain

Sport
- Sport: Athletics
- Event: High jump

Francisco Jesús Martín Morillas (born 1 February 1955) is a Spanish athlete. He competed in the men's high jump at the 1976 Summer Olympics.
