= Eleuterio Antón =

Spanish long-distance runner

Personal information
- Nationality: Spanish
- Born: 30 March 1950 (age 76) Yudego, Spain

Sport
- Sport: Long-distance running
- Event: Marathon

Eleuterio Antón (born 30 March 1950) is a Spanish long-distance runner. He competed in the marathon at the 1980 Summer Olympics.

He finished 3rd in Amsterdam in 1982 with 2h14:14 and obtained so the Spanish record. He developed his career in helping people with disabilities working for ONCE then for FEDC. Currently he is giving support to FEDDF.

He continues advocating for athletics and adaptive sports at global level.

== Marcas campeonato de España de Maratón ==
22/04/1979	Avilés	Eleuterio Antón	Madrid	2h17:01.7
08/06/1980	Laredo	Eleuterio Antón	Madrid	2h14:32
12/07/1981	Oyárzun	Eleuterio Antón	Burgos	2h20:49
20/05/1984	Fuenterrabía	Eleuterio Antón	Lerida	2h13:28

== Articles ==
El País	Antón, el mejor maratoniano
El País	Eleuterio Antón, favorito en la maratón de Madrid
El Diario Vasco	El circuito de Donosti es bueno para disfrutar y hacer marca
