= Luis María Garriga =

Spanish high jumper

Personal information
- Full name: Luis María Garriga Ortiz
- Nationality: Spanish
- Born: 14 June 1945 (age 81)

Sport
- Sport: Athletics
- Event: High jump

Luis María Garriga Ortiz (born 14 June 1945) is a Spanish athlete. He competed in the men's high jump at the 1964 Summer Olympics without reaching the final. He also competed at the 1968 Summer Olympics finished eleventh in the high jump final.
