= María Luisa Larraga =

Spanish long-distance runner

María Luisa Larraga Cacho (born 10 December 1970 in Zaragoza) is a Spanish runner who specializes in the 10,000 metres.

== Achievements ==
| Year | Competition | Venue | Position | Event | Notes |
Representing Spain
| 1998 | World Half Marathon Championships | Uster, Switzerland | 14th | Half marathon | 1:11:30 PB |
| 1998 | European Indoor Championships | Budapest, Hungary | 9th | 10,000 m | |
| 1999 | World Championships | Seville, Spain | 21st | 10,000 m | |
| 2001 | Valencia Marathon | Valencia, Spain | 1st | Marathon | |
| 2001 | World Championships | Edmonton, Canada | 27th | Marathon | 2:36:20 |
| 2002 | European Indoor Championships | Vienna, Austria | 7th | 3000 m | |
| 2002 | World Cross Country Championships | Dublin, Ireland | 24th | Long race | |
| 2002 | World Cross Country Championships | Dublin, Ireland | 7th | Team | |

=== Personal bests ===
- 1500 metres - 4:23.5 min (2000)
- 3000 metres - 8:59.35i min (2002)
- 5000 metres - 15:28.78 min (1998)
- 10,000 metres - 31:45.85 min (2002)
- Half marathon - 1:11:30 hrs (1998)
- Marathon - 2:30:11 hrs (2001)
