= Rodrigo Gavela =

Spanish long-distance runner

Personal information
- Born: January 5, 1966 (age 60) Fabero, León

Sport
- Sport: Marathon running

Rodrigo Gavela Rodríguez (born January 5, 1966) is a former long-distance athlete from Spain, who finished in 18th position (2:16.23) in the men's marathon at the 1992 Summer Olympics in Barcelona, Spain.

== Achievements ==
- All results regarding marathon, unless stated otherwise

Year	Competition	Venue	Position	Notes
Representing Spain
1992	Olympic Games	Barcelona, Spain	18th	2:16:23
1994	European Championships	Helsinki, Finland	—	DNF
