= Antonio Campos (athlete) =

Spanish athlete

Personal information
- Nationality: Spanish
- Born: 19 April 1951 (age 75)

Sport
- Sport: Athletics
- Events: Steeplechase, long-distance running

Antonio Campos (born 19 April 1951) is a Spanish steeplechase and long-distance runner. He competed in the men's 3000 metres steeplechase at the 1976 Summer Olympics.
