= Alberto Solanas =

Spanish long jumper

Personal information
- Full name: Alberto Solanas Galán
- Born: 6 November 1955 (age 70) Zaragoza, Spain
- Height: 1.88 m (6 ft 2 in)
- Weight: 75 kg (165 lb)

Sport
- Country: Spain
- Sport: Athletics
- Event: Long jump

Alberto Solanas Galán (Note: In this Spanish name, the first or paternal surname is Solanas and the second or maternal family name is Galán.) (born 6 November 1955) is a Spanish athlete. He competed in the men's long jump at the 1980 Summer Olympics.
