= Manuel González (athlete) =

Spanish sprinter

Personal information
- Nationality: Spanish
- Born: 1 January 1963 (age 63) Lleida, Spain

Sport
- Sport: Sprinting
- Event: 4 × 400 metres relay

Manuel González Solanes (born 1 January 1963) is a Spanish sprinter. He competed in the men's 4 × 400 metres relay at the 1984 Summer Olympics.
