= Raúl Jimeno =

Spanish hammer thrower

Personal information
- Nationality: Spanish
- Born: 18 May 1959 (age 67) Madrid, Spain

Sport
- Sport: Athletics
- Event: Hammer throw

Raúl Jimeno Pérez (born 18 May 1959) is a Spanish athlete. He competed in the men's hammer throw at the 1984 Summer Olympics.

He represented his country at the 1984 Summer Olympics in Los Angeles, where he was eliminated in the qualification in the hammer throw.
