= Teresa Rioné =

Spanish sprinter

Personal information
- Nationality: Spanish
- Born: 23 March 1965 (age 61) Sant Just Desvern, Barcelona, Spain

Sport
- Sport: Sprinting
- Event: 100 metres

Teresa Rioné Llano (born 23 March 1965) is a Spanish sprinter. She competed in the women's 100 metres at the 1984 Summer Olympics.
