= Maria José Martínez Patiño =

Spanish hurdler (born 1961)

Maria José Martínez Patiño (born 10 July 1961) is a Spanish former hurdler, whose dismissal from the Spanish Olympic team in 1986 for failing the sex verification test is a notable moment in the history of sex verification in sports.

Martínez Patiño was dismissed after a competition that would have set her up for participation at the 1988 Summer Olympics. She was shamed publicly when she participated in a hurdles event in the Spanish national championships in 1986, but fought the loss of her IAAF license successfully and was able to compete for participation in the 1992 Olympics. Since then she has written about her experience, and her test and its fallout has become a highly publicized and frequently cited case concerning sex testing as well as the privacy of athletes.

== Athletic career ==
Martínez Patiño participated in the 100 metres hurdles, where her best time is 13.71 (Madrid 1983). Her best performance in international competition was 13.78, at the 1983 World Championships in Athletics in Helsinki.

=== Sex testing ===
Martínez Patiño is an intersex woman who has androgen insensitivity syndrome (AIS). She passed a sex test in 1983 at the IAAF World Championships, and received her "certificate of femaleness". However, she failed the sex chromatin test in 1985, and thus was ruled ineligible to participate in women's athletics. The test was taken during the 1985 World University Games in Kobe, Japan, as a result of her having forgotten to bring the result of the sex test that she had passed two years earlier. The sex chromatin test was, at the time, the first step in the sex verification process, and not intended to provide a definitive and final decision, but officials from the International Olympic Committee and the International Association of Athletics Federations routinely advised athletes to fake an injury after such a test so they could withdraw from competition quietly and protect their privacy. (Note: The public humiliation of Ewa Kłobukowska, a Polish sprinter who had been declared a man in 1967, caused an outcry which led to a change in IOC policy.) This is what Martínez Patiño was advised to do, and she complied. Two months later she received a letter that classified her as male, citing her karyotype, 46,XY, though any perceived advantage she could be said to have is negated by her AIS: "she was disqualified for an advantage that she did not have".

In 1986, she entered the 60 metres hurdles event in the Spanish national championships but was told that she could either withdraw quietly or be denounced in public. She competed and won, and was punished in the Spanish press. She lost her scholarship and her athletic residency, besides paying a high personal price by losing her privacy and her fiancé. She continued to fight her expulsion: in 1988 she was defended by the genetic scientist Albert de la Chapelle; (Note: De la Chappelle was an avowed critic of the testing performed by the IAAF, having written in JAMA in 1986 that "the present screening method is both inaccurate and discriminatory".) and her IAAF license was restored three months later. She tried to qualify for the 1992 Olympics, but fell short by one-tenth of a second.

== Published works ==
Martínez Patiño described her experience in "Personal Account: A Woman Tried and Tested", published by The Lancet in 2005. In "Reexamining Rationales of 'Fairness': An Athlete and Insider's Perspective on the New Policies on Hyperandrogenism in Elite Female Athletes" published by the American Journal of Bioethics in 2012, Martínez Patiño and co-author Hida Viloria discussed current sex testing practices in sport.

== See also ==
- Caster Semenya
- Santhi Soundarajan
- Dutee Chand
