= Ángeles Barreiro =

Spanish discus thrower

Personal information
- Full name: Ángeles Barreiro Rico
- Nationality: Spanish
- Born: 26 July 1963 (age 62) Boimorto, Spain

Sport
- Sport: Athletics
- Event: Discus throw

Ángeles Barreiro Rico (born 26 July 1963) is a Spanish athlete. She competed in the women's discus throw at the 1992 Summer Olympics.
