= Gregoria Ferrer =

Spanish sprinter (born 1963)

Personal information
- Nationality: Spanish
- Born: 4 June 1963 (age 62) Zaragoza, Spain

Sport
- Sport: Sprinting
- Event: 4 × 400 metres relay

Gregoria Ferrer (born 4 June 1963) is a Spanish sprinter. She competed in the women's 4 × 400 metres relay at the 1992 Summer Olympics.
