= Isabel Mozún =

Spanish athlete

Personal information
- Nationality: Spanish
- Born: 26 March 1960 (age 66) Madrid, Spain
- Height: 1.71 m (5 ft 7 in)
- Weight: 55 kg (121 lb)

Sport
- Sport: Athletics
- Event: High jump

Isabel Mozún Borlaz (born 26 March 1960) is a Spanish athlete. She competed in the women's high jump at the 1984 Summer Olympics.
