= Athletics at the 1980 Summer Olympics – Men's high jump =

Men's high jump at the Games of the XXII Olympiad
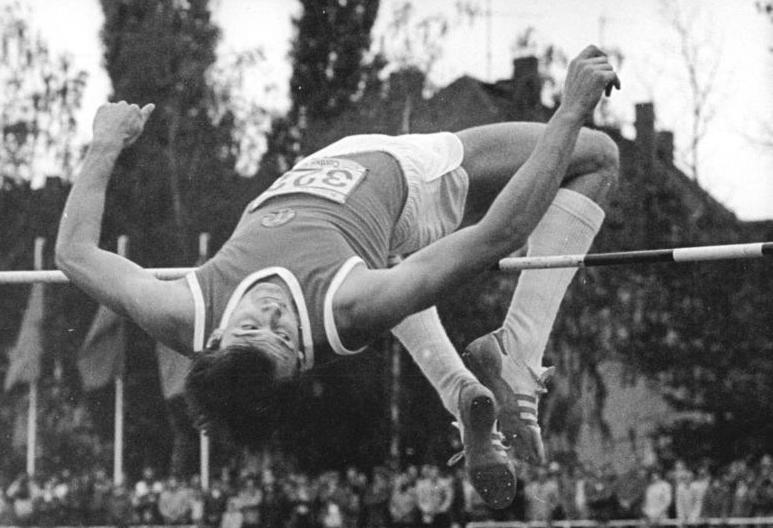
- Gerd Wessig earlier in 1980
- Venue: Lenin Stadium
- Dates: 31 July-1 August
- Competitors: 30 from 19 nations
- Winning height: 2.36 WR

Medalists
1st place, gold medalist(s)		Gerd Wessig; East Germany
2nd place, silver medalist(s)		Jacek Wszoła; Poland
3rd place, bronze medalist(s)		Jörg Freimuth; East Germany

The men's high jump event at the 1980 Summer Olympics in Moscow, Soviet Union, had an entry list of 30 competitors from 19 nations. The maximum number of athletes per nation had been set at 3 since the 1930 Olympic Congress. The final was held on Friday 1 August 1980. The event was won by Gerd Wessig of East Germany, the first gold medal by a German athlete in the men's high jump. It was also the first time a world record in the high jump had been set at the Olympics. Jörg Freimuth took bronze, making East Germany the third nation (after the United States and Soviet Union) to have two medalists in the event in the same Games. Defending champion Jacek Wszoła of Poland took silver, becoming the fourth man to win two high jump medals and matching Valeriy Brumel for best results at one gold and one silver. Through the 2016 Games, Wszoła, Brumel, and Javier Sotomayor (who joined them at one gold and one silver in 2000) remain the most successful Olympic men's high jumpers; no high jumper has won two gold medals, or one gold and two silvers. Due at least in part to the American-led boycott, the United States' streak of making the podium in every Olympic men's high jump event to date (18 times before 1980) ended.

== Background ==
This was the 19th appearance of the event, which is one of 12 athletics events to have been held at every Summer Olympics. The only returning finalist from the 1976 Games was gold medalist Jacek Wszoła of Poland. Four men had broken or tied the world record since the Montreal Games, but Wszoła was the only one in Moscow. American Dwight Stones (2.32 metres just days after taking bronze in Montreal) was absent due to the American-led boycott. Vladimir Yashchenko of the Soviet Union (2.33 metres in 1977, 2.34 metres in 1978) was injured. Wszoła had set the then-current record of 2.35 metres in 1980; Dietmar Mögenburg of West Germany had matched it the next day. Mögenburg was also absent due to the boycott. This left Wszoła as the "heavy favorite."

Algeria, Senegal, and Syria each made their debut in the event. France appeared for the 16th time, most of any nation competing but behind the absent United States (18 appearances) and tied with the also-absent Sweden (16 appearances).

== Competition format ==
The competition used the two-round format introduced in 1912. There were two distinct rounds of jumping with results cleared between rounds. Jumpers were eliminated if they had three consecutive failures, whether at a single height or between multiple heights if they attempted to advance before clearing a height.

The qualifying round had the bar set at 2.05 metres, 2.10 metres, 2.15 metres, 2.18 metres, and 2.21 metres. All jumpers clearing 2.21 metres in the qualifying round advanced to the final. If fewer than 12 jumpers could achieve it, the top 12 (including ties) would advance to the final.

The final had jumps at 2.10 metres, 2.15 metres, 2.18 metres, 2.21 metres, 2.24 metres, 2.27 metres, 2.29 metres, 2.31 metres, 2.33 metres, 2.36 metres, and 2.38 metres.

== Records ==
Prior to this competition, the existing world and Olympic records were as follows.

World record	Jacek Wszoła (POL)	2.35	Eberstadt, West Germany	25 May 1980
Olympic record	Jacek Wszoła (POL)	2.25	Montreal, Canada	31 July 1976

All three East Germans, as well as Jacek Wszoła, successfully jumped 2.27 metres to beat the Olympic record; the four men each cleared 2.29 metres as well. The medalists (Gerd Wessig, Wszoła, and Jörg Freimuth) were the three men to clear 2.31. Only Wessig succeeded at 2.33 metres; he then went for a new world record at 2.36, clearing it in his second attempt. He could not extend his new record to 2.38 metres, however.

== Schedule ==
All times are Moscow Time (UTC+3)

Date	Time	Round
Thursday, 31 July 1980	10:00	Qualifying
Saturday, 1 August 1980	16:30	Final

== Results ==
Key

- o = Height cleared
- x = Height failed
- – = Height passed
- r = Retired
- SB = Season's best
- PB = Personal best
- NR = National record
- AR = Area record
- OR = Olympic record
- WR = World record
- WL = World lead
- NM = No mark
- DNS = Did not start
- DQ = Disqualified

=== Qualifying ===
The qualifying round was held on Thursday July 31, 1980.

Rank	Group	Athlete	Nation	2.05	2.10	2.15	2.18	2.21	Height	Notes
1	B	Mark Naylor	Great Britain	—	o	o	o	o	2.21	Q
2	A	Jörg Freimuth	East Germany	o	o	o	o	o	2.21	Q
2	A	Henry Lauterbach	East Germany	o	o	o	o	o	2.21	Q
2	A	Gerd Wessig	East Germany	o	o	o	o	o	2.21	Q
5	A	Roland Dalhäuser	Switzerland	—	o	o	xo	o	2.21	Q
6	A	Aleksey Demyanyuk	Soviet Union	xo	xo	o	o	o	2.21	Q
6	A	Gennadiy Belkov	Soviet Union	o	o	o	xxo	o	2.21	Q
6	A	Marco Tamberi	Italy	o	o	o	xxo	o	2.21	Q
6	B	Vaso Komnenić	Yugoslavia	o	o	o	xxo	o	2.21	Q
10	B	Sorin Matei	Romania	—	o	xo	xxo	o	2.21	Q
11	A	Jacek Wszoła	Poland	—	o	o	o	xo	2.21	Q
12	A	Adrian Proteasa	Romania	—	xxo	o	xo	xo	2.21	Q
13	A	Aleksandr Grigoryev	Soviet Union	—	o	o	o	xxo	2.21	Q
14	B	Guy Moreau	Belgium	o	o	o	xo	xxo	2.21	Q
15	A	Janusz Trzepizur	Poland	—	xo	xo	o	xxo	2.21	Q
16	B	Roberto Cabrejas	Spain	o	o	xo	xxo	xxo	2.21	Q
17	A	Francis Agbo	France	—	o	o	o	xxx	2.18	
18	A	Oscar Raise	Italy	o	o	xo	o	xxx	2.18	
19	A	Zoltán Torsi	Hungary	o	xo	xo	o	xxx	2.18	
20	A	Paolo Borghi	Italy	o	o	o	xo	xxx	2.18	
21	B	Abdel Hamid Sahil	Algeria	xo	o	o	xxo	xxx	2.18	
22	B	Martí Perarnau	Spain	o	xo	o	xxx	—	2.15	
23	B	István Gibicsár	Hungary	xo	o	xxo	xxx	—	2.15	
24	B	Atanas Mladenov	Bulgaria	o	o	xxx	—		2.10	
24	B	Desmond Morris	Jamaica	o	o	xxx	—		2.10	
26	B	Francisco Centelles	Cuba	—	xo	xxx	—		2.10	
27	B	Moussa Sagna Fall	Senegal	o	xo	xxx	—		2.10	
28	B	Othmane Belfaa	Algeria	o	xxx	—			2.05	
29	B	Ahmad Balkis	Syria	xo	xxx	—			2.05	
29	B	Cláudio Freire	Brazil	xo	xxx	—			2.05	

=== Final ===
Rank	Athlete	Nation	2.10	2.15	2.18	2.21	2.24	2.27	2.29	2.31	2.33	2.36	2.38	Height	Notes
1st place, gold medalist(s)	Gerd Wessig	East Germany	—	o	—	o	o	o	xo	o	xo	xo	xxx	2.36	WR
2nd place, silver medalist(s)	Jacek Wszoła	Poland	—	o	—	xo	xo	o	o	xo	xxx	—		2.31	
3rd place, bronze medalist(s)	Jörg Freimuth	East Germany	o	—	o	o	o	xxo	o	xo	xxx	—		2.31	
4	Henry Lauterbach	East Germany	—	o	—	xxo	xo	o	o	xxx	—			2.29	
5	Roland Dalhäuser	Switzerland	—	o	—	o	xo	xxx	—					2.24	
6	Vaso Komnenić	Yugoslavia	o	o	—	o	xxo	xxx	—					2.24	
7	Adrian Proteasa	Romania	–	o	o	o	xxx	—						2.21	
8	Aleksandr Grigoryev	Soviet Union	o	o	o	o	xxx	—						2.21	
9	Mark Naylor	Great Britain	—	o	xo	o	xxx	—						2.21	
10	Gennadiy Belkov	Soviet Union	o	o	xo	o	xxx	—						2.21	
11	Aleksey Demyanyuk	Soviet Union	o	o	xo	xxo	xxx	—						2.21	
12	Janusz Trzepizur	Poland	—	o	o	xxx	—							2.18	
13	Sorin Matei	Romania	o	o	o	xxx	—							2.18	
14	Guy Moreau	Belgium	o	o	xo	xxx	—							2.18	
15	Marco Tamberi	Italy	o	o	xxx	—								2.15	
16	Roberto Cabrejas	Spain	o	xxx	—									2.10	

== See also ==
- 1976 Men's Olympic High Jump (Montreal)
- 1978 Men's European Championships High Jump (Prague)
- 1982 Men's European Championships High Jump (Athens)
- 1983 Men's World Championships High Jump (Helsinki)
- 1984 Men's Olympic High Jump (Los Angeles)
- 1986 Men's European Championships High Jump (Stuttgart)
- 1987 Men's World Championships High Jump (Rome)
