= 1980 European Athletics Indoor Championships – Men's high jump =

The men's high jump event at the 1980 European Athletics Indoor Championships was held on 2 March in Sindelfingen.

== Results ==
Rank	Name	Nationality	Result	Notes
1st place, gold medalist(s)	Dietmar Mögenburg	West Germany	2.31	
2nd place, silver medalist(s)	Jacek Wszoła	Poland	2.29	
3rd place, bronze medalist(s)	Adrian Proteasa	Romania	2.29	
4	Carlo Thränhardt	West Germany	2.26	
5	Marco Tamberi	Italy	2.26	
6	Aleksey Demyanyuk	Soviet Union	2.26	
7	Ruud Wielart	Netherlands	2.26	
8	Roland Dalhäuser	Switzerland	2.26	
9	István Gibicsár	Hungary	2.23	
10	Guy Moreau	Belgium	2.19	
11	Bruno Bruni	Italy	2.19	
12	Vaso Komnenić	Yugoslavia	2.19	
13	Gerd Nagel	West Germany	2.19	
14	Stefan Karlsson	Sweden	2.19	
15	Franck Bonnet	France	2.19	
16	Marc Borra	Belgium	2.15	
17	Francisco Martín	Spain	2.15	
18	Gennadiy Belkov	Soviet Union	2.15	
19	Stevan Filipović	Yugoslavia	2.15	
20	William Nachtegael	Belgium	2.15	
21	Martí Perarnau	Spain	2.15	
22	Zoltán Társi	Hungary	2.10	
23	Massimo Di Giorgio	Italy	2.10	
24	Bernard Bachorz	France	2.10	
25	Harri Sundell	Finland	2.05	
