= 1981 European Athletics Indoor Championships – Men's high jump =

The men's high jump event at the 1981 European Athletics Indoor Championships was held on 21 February.

== Results ==
Rank	Name	Nationality	2.00	2.05	2.10	2.15	2.19	2.22	2.25	2.28	2.30	Result	Notes
1st place, gold medalist(s)	Roland Dalhäuser	Switzerland	−	−	−	o	−	o	o	xxo	xxx	2.28	
2nd place, silver medalist(s)	Carlo Thränhardt	West Germany	−	−	o	o	o	o	o	xxx		2.25	
3rd place, bronze medalist(s)	Dietmar Mögenburg	West Germany	−	−	o	o	o	o	o	xxx		2.25	
4	Vladimir Granyenkov	Soviet Union	−	−	−	o	xo	xxo	o	xxx		2.25	
5	Franck Bonnet	France	−	−	o	o	xo	xxx				2.19	
6	Stefan Karlsson	Sweden	−	−	o	o	xxo	xxx				2.19	
6	Jörg Freimuth	East Germany	−	−	o	o	xxo	xxx				2.19	
6	Krzysztof Krawczyk	Poland	−	o	−	o	xxo	xxx				2.19	
6	André Schneider-Laub	West Germany	−	−	o	o	xxo	xxx				2.19	
10	Marco Tamberi	Italy	−	−	xxo	o	xxo	xxx				2.19	
11	Ramon Diaz	France	−	o	o	o	xxx					2.15	
12	Gottfried Wittgruber	Austria	−	−	xo	o	xxx					2.15	
13	Wolfgang Tschirk	Austria	−	−	o	xo	xxx					2.15	
14	Bernard Bachorz	France	o	o	o	xo						2.15	
15	Martí Perarnau	Spain	−	xo	xxo	xo	xxx					2.15	
16	Mark Naylor	Great Britain		−	−	o	xxo	xxx				2.15	
17	Lorenzo Bianchi	Italy	−	o	o	xxo	xxx					2.15	
18	Juha Porkka	Finland	−	−	o	xxx						2.10	
18	Paolo Borghi	Italy	−	−	o	xxx						2.10	
18	Tibor Gerstenbrein	Hungary	−	−	o	xxx						2.10	
21	Jindřich Vondra	Czechoslovakia	−	xo	o	x−	xx					2.10	
22	Danial Temim	Yugoslavia	xo	o	o	xxx						2.10	
23	Dimitrios Patronis	Greece	−	xo	xxx							2.05	
	Oleksiy Demyanyuk	Soviet Union	−	−	−	−	−	xxx				NM	
