= 1982 European Athletics Championships – Men's high jump =

1982 athletic event

Men's high jump at the European Athletics Championships

These are the official results of the Men's High Jump event at the 1982 European Championships in Athens, Greece, held at the Olympic Stadium "Spiros Louis" on 10 and 11 September 1982.

== Medalists ==
Gold	Dietmar Mögenburg; West Germany
Silver	Janusz Trzepizur; Poland
Bronze	Gerd Nagel; West Germany

== Results ==
=== Final ===
11 September

Rank	Name	Nationality	Result	Notes
1st place, gold medalist(s)	Dietmar Mögenburg	West Germany	2.30	CR
2nd place, silver medalist(s)	Janusz Trzepizur	Poland	2.27	
3rd place, bronze medalist(s)	Gerd Nagel	West Germany	2.24	
4	Andre Schneider-Laub	West Germany	2.24	
5	Valeriy Sereda	Soviet Union	2.21	
6	Vladimir Granyenkov	Soviet Union	2.21	
7	Roland Dalhäuser	Switzerland	2.21	
8	Franck Bonnet	France	2.18	
9	Thomas Eriksson	Sweden	2.18	
10	Patrik Sjöberg	Sweden	2.15	
10	Josef Hrabal	Czechoslovakia	2.15	
	Jacek Wszoła	Poland	DNS	

=== Qualification ===
10 September

Rank	Name	Nationality	Result	Notes
	Janusz Trzepizur	Poland	2.24	Q
	Gerd Nagel	West Germany	2.24	Q
	Franck Bonnet	France	2.21	q
	Jacek Wszoła	Poland	2.21	q
	Thomas Eriksson	Sweden	2.21	q
	Roland Dalhäuser	Switzerland	2.21	q
	Valeriy Sereda	Soviet Union	2.21	q
	Dietmar Mögenburg	West Germany	2.21	q
	Vladimir Granyenkov	Soviet Union	2.21	q
	Josef Hrabal	Czechoslovakia	2.21	q
	Patrik Sjöberg	Sweden	2.21	q
	Andre Schneider-Laub	West Germany	2.21	q
	Roberto Cabrejas	Spain	2.18	
	Geoff Parsons	United Kingdom	2.18	
	Novica Čanović	Yugoslavia	2.18	
	Gianni Davito	Italy	2.18	
	Franck Verzy	France	2.15	
	Sorin Matei	Romania	2.15	
	Massimo Di Giorgio	Italy	2.15	
	Aleksey Demyanyuk	Soviet Union	2.15	
	Miguel Moral	Spain	2.10	
	Michail Minoudis	Greece	2.10	

== Participation ==
According to an unofficial count, 22 athletes from 13 countries participated in the event.

- Czechoslovakia (1)
- France (2)
- Greece (1)
- Italy (2)
- Poland (2)
- Romania (1)
- Soviet Union (3)
- Spain (2)
- Sweden (2)
- Switzerland (1)
- United Kingdom (1)
- West Germany (3)
- Yugoslavia (1)

== See also ==
- 1978 Men's European Championships High Jump (Prague)
- 1980 Men's Olympic High Jump (Moscow)
- 1983 Men's World Championships High Jump (Helsinki)
- 1984 Men's Olympic High Jump (Los Angeles)
- 1986 Men's European Championships High Jump (Stuttgart)
- 1987 Men's World Championships High Jump (Rome)
- 1988 Men's Olympic High Jump (Seoul)
