= 1982 European Athletics Indoor Championships – Men's high jump =

High jump event

The men's high jump event at the 1982 European Athletics Indoor Championships was held on 6 March.

== Results ==
Rank	Name	Nationality	Results	Notes
1st place, gold medalist(s)	Dietmar Mögenburg	West Germany	2.34	
2nd place, silver medalist(s)	Janusz Trzepizur	Poland	2.32	NR
3rd place, bronze medalist(s)	Roland Dalhäuser	Switzerland	2.32	NR
4	Gerd Nagel	West Germany	2.28	
5	Valeriy Sereda	Soviet Union	2.22	
6	Carlo Thränhardt	West Germany	2.22	
7	Roberto Cabrejas	Spain	2.22	PB
8	Massimo Di Giorgio	Italy	2.22	
9	Gianni Davito	Italy	2.22	
10	Patrik Sjöberg	Sweden	2.22	
11	Franck Bonnet	France	2.19	
11	Yuriy Shevchenko	Soviet Union	2.19	
11	Francis Agbo	France	2.19	
11	Oscar Raise	Italy	2.19	
15	Dariusz Zielke	Poland	2.19	
16	Dimitrios Kattis	Greece	2.19	
17	Mihail Minoudis	Greece	2.15	
17	Eddy Annys	Belgium	2.15	
17	Wolfgang Tschirk	Austria	2.15	
20	Franck Verzy	France	2.15	
