= 1979 European Athletics Indoor Championships – Men's high jump =

The men's high jump event at the 1979 European Athletics Indoor Championships was held on 24 February in Vienna.

== Results ==
Rank	Name	Nationality	Result	Notes
1st place, gold medalist(s)	Vladimir Yashchenko	Soviet Union	2.26	
2nd place, silver medalist(s)	Gennadiy Belkov	Soviet Union	2.26	
3rd place, bronze medalist(s)	André Schneider-Laub	West Germany	2.24	
4	Gerd Nagel	West Germany	2.24	
5	Bruno Bruni	Italy	2.21	
6	Henry Lauterbach	East Germany	2.21	
7	József Jámbor	Hungary	2.21	
8	Gottfried Wittgruber	Austria	2.18	
9	Massimo Di Giorgio	Italy	2.18	
10	Roland Dalhäuser	Switzerland	2.18	
11	Jindřich Vondra	Czechoslovakia	2.15	
12	Oscar Raise	Italy	2.15	
13	István Major	Hungary	2.15	
14	Mark Naylor	Great Britain	2.15	
15	Vaso Komnenić	Yugoslavia	2.15	
16	Francis Agbo	France	2.10	
17	Eddy Annys	Belgium	2.10	
