= Perarnau =

Perarnau may refer to:

- Josep Perarnau (1928–2026), Catalan priest, theologian and historian
- Marta Perarnau (born 1995), Spanish footballer
- Martí Perarnau (born 1955), Spanish sports journalist and former athlete
- Muriel Villanueva i Perarnau (born 1976), Spanish writer
