= Złote Kolce =

The Złote Kolce (transl. Golden Spikes) is an annual sports award in recognition of Polish competitors in the sport of athletics. Established in 1970 by Polish newspaper Sport and Polish Athletic Association, the award is decided by a complex points ranking system, which incorporates scores for performances in major national and international competitions, record-breaking performances, and end-of-year global rankings by World Athletics.

== Winners ==
Year	Female winner	Male winner
1970	Teresa Sukniewicz	Henryk Szordykowski
1971	Irena Szewińska	Władysław Komar
1972	Irena Szewińska	Władysław Komar
1973	Irena Szewińska	Bronisław Malinowski
1974	Irena Szewińska	Bronisław Malinowski
1975	Irena Szewińska	Władysław Kozakiewicz
1976	Irena Szewińska	Jacek Wszoła
1977	Irena Szewińska	Władysław Kozakiewicz
1978	Grażyna Rabsztyn	Jan Ornoch
1979	Grażyna Rabsztyn	Marian Woronin
1980	Grażyna Rabsztyn	Władysław Kozakiewicz
1981	Małgorzata Nowak	Bogusław Mamiński
1982	Lucyna Kałek	Janusz Trzepizur
1983	Lucyna Kałek	Zdzisław Hoffmann
1984	Lucyna Kałek	Bogusław Mamiński
1985	Genowefa Błaszak	Marian Woronin
1986	Ewa Kasprzyk	Krzysztof Krawczyk
1987	Ewa Kasprzyk	Marian Woronin
1988	Agata Karczmarek	Zdzisław Szlapkin
1989	Małgorzata Rydz	Tomasz Nagórka
1990	Wanda Panfil	Robert Korzeniowski
1991	Wanda Panfil	Artur Partyka
1992	Małgorzata Rydz	Artur Partyka
1993	Urszula Włodarczyk	Artur Partyka
1994	Urszula Włodarczyk	Artur Partyka
1995	Małgorzata Sobańska	Artur Partyka
1996	Urszula Włodarczyk	Robert Korzeniowski
1997	Urszula Włodarczyk	Robert Korzeniowski
1998	Urszula Włodarczyk	Artur Partyka
1999	Krystyna Zabawska	Marcin Urbaś
2000	Kamila Skolimowska	Robert Korzeniowski
2001	Monika Pyrek	Szymon Ziółkowski
2002	Kamila Skolimowska	Robert Korzeniowski
2003	Monika Pyrek	Robert Korzeniowski
2004	Anna Rogowska	Robert Korzeniowski
2005	Monika Pyrek	Szymon Ziółkowski
2006	Monika Pyrek	Daniel Dąbrowski
2007	Anna Jesień	Marek Plawgo
2008	Monika Pyrek	Tomasz Majewski
2009	Anita Włodarczyk	Piotr Małachowski
2010	Anita Włodarczyk	Piotr Małachowski
2011	Karolina Tymińska	Paweł Wojciechowski
2012	Anita Włodarczyk	Tomasz Majewski
2013	Anita Włodarczyk	Paweł Fajdek
2014	Anita Włodarczyk	Adam Kszczot
2015	Anita Włodarczyk	Paweł Fajdek
2016	Anita Włodarczyk	Piotr Małachowski
2017	Anita Włodarczyk	Piotr Lisek
2018	Anita Włodarczyk	Wojciech Nowicki
2019	Joanna Fiodorow	Marcin Lewandowski
2020	Justyna Święty-Ersetic	Wojciech Nowicki
2021	Anita Włodarczyk	Wojciech Nowicki
2022	Katarzyna Zdziebło	Paweł Fajdek
2023	Natalia Kaczmarek	Wojciech Nowicki
