= Tom McCants =

American high jumper (born 1962)

Tom McCants (born November 27, 1962) is a retired American high jumper.

He finished twelfth at the 1987 World Championships. He also competed at the 1989 World Indoor Championships without reaching the final.

His personal best jump is 2.37 metres, achieved in May 1988 in Columbus, Ohio.

McCants competed for the Alabama Crimson Tide track and field team in the NCAA. At the 1985 NCAA Division I Outdoor Track and Field Championships, McCants and Thomas Eriksson both tied Dwight Stones' American collegiate record in the high jump at 7 ft 7 1/4 in (2.31 m). Neither could clear the next height, but Eriksson was given the win on countback and McCants was the national runner-up.
