= 1988 European Athletics Indoor Championships – Men's high jump =

The men's high jump event at the 1988 European Athletics Indoor Championships was held on 5 March.

== Results ==
Rank	Name	Nationality	2.00	2.05	2.10	2.15	2.20	2.24	2.27	2.30	2.33	2.35	2.37	2.39	2.41	2.43	Result	Notes
1st place, gold medalist(s)	Patrik Sjöberg	Sweden	–	–	–	–	–	o	–	o	–	o	–	xo	–	xxx	2.39	CR
2nd place, silver medalist(s)	Dietmar Mögenburg	West Germany	–	–	–	–	–	o	–	–	o	–	xo	–	xxx		2.37	
3rd place, bronze medalist(s)	Sorin Matei	Romania	–	–	–	–	xo	o	–	o	xxo	xo	xx–	x			2.35	
4	Fabrizio Borellini	Italy	–	–	o	o	o	o	o	xo	xxx						2.30	
5	Róbert Ruffini	Czechoslovakia	–	–	–	–	o	o	o	xxx							2.27	
6	Georgi Dakov	Bulgaria	–	–	–	o	xo	o	o	xxx							2.27	
7	Daniele Pagani	Italy	–	–	o	o	o	o	xo	xxx							2.27	
8	Carlo Thränhardt	West Germany	–	–	–	–	–	o	–	x–							2.24	
8	Gyula Németh	Hungary	–	–	o	–	o	o	xxx								2.24	
10	Håkon Särnblom	Norway	–	–	xo	o	xo	o	xxx								2.24	
11	Dalton Grant	Great Britain	–	–	–	o	xxo	xxo	xxx								2.24	
12	Hrvoje Fižuleto	Yugoslavia	–	–	o	o	o	xxx									2.20	
13	Gerd Nagel	West Germany	–	–	–	o	–	xr									2.15	
14	Murat Ayaydın	Turkey	o	o	xxo	xxo	xxx										2.15	
	Dominique Hernandez	France															DNS	
	Markus Einberger	Austria															DNS	
