= Athletics at the 1975 Spartakiad of the Peoples of the USSR =

1975 Soviet Spartakiad
- Dates: 27 – 30 July 1975
- Host city: Moscow; Tallinn (combined events June 7-9)
- Venue: Central Lenin Stadium
- Level: Senior
- Type: Outdoor

The final stage of the athletics events (also known as track and field) of the 6th Summer Spartakiad of the Peoples of the USSR were held in the Central Lenin (Luzhniki) Stadium in Moscow between 27 July and 30 July 1979. Traditionally it also served as the 1975 Soviet Athletics Championships.

== Overview ==
During the four days there were awarded 37 sets of medals. The Spartakiad and Championship winners in decathlon and pentathlon competitions (combined events of track and field) were determined earlier from 7 to 9 June. Those events took place in Tallinn.

The competition was won by Moscow, followed by Ukrainian SSR, and Russian SFSR.

Two new Soviet records were made: Vladimir Kischkun won pole vault with a 5.45, breaking previous record by 4 cm, and Natalya Lebedeva won 100 metres hurdles with a new Soviet record of 12,8, cutting previous record by 0,2 seconds. The competition record in triple jump was set by Viktor Saneyev who defended his championship title by jumping 17.33 meters.

Same as during the 1971 Spartakiad, the triple-title champion of the Spartakiad became Valeriy Borzov earning 6 gold medals in total and repeating the record of Galina Popova (won in 1959 and 1963).

One event of the Soviet Athletic Championship, cross country running, which took place earlier in Tbilisi (April 20), was not part of the Spartakiad. Also, in 1975 there was the Soviet Indoor Athletics Championships which took place in Leningrad (February 18-19) and did not count towards the Spartakiad.

== Men's events ==
=== Track ===
| Event | Gold | | Silver | | Bronze | |
|---|---|---|---|---|---|---|
| 100 m | Valery Borzov (Ukrainian SSR) (Kyiv) | 10.2 | Aleksandr Kornelyuk (Moscow) | 10.3 | Nikolay Kolesnikov (Leningrad) | 10.4 |
| 200 m | Valery Borzov (Ukrainian SSR) (Kyiv) | 20.6 | Sergey Vladimirtsev (Turkmen SSR) (Ashgabat) | 20.9 | Vladimir Lovetskiy (Byelorussian SSR) (Minsk) | 20.9 |
| 400 m | Pavel Kozban (Leningrad) | 46.8 | Semyon Kocher (Russian SFSR) (Yessentuki) | 46.9 | Gennady Ivanov (Uzbek SSR) (Chirchiq) | 46.9 |
| 800 m | Vladimir Ponomaryov (Russian SFSR) (Rostov-on-Don) | 1:47.3 | Georgy Chernyshev (Moscow) | 1:47.8 | Yevhen Arzhanov (Ukrainian SSR) (Kyiv) | 1:47.9 |
| 1500 m | Aleksandr Andrusenko (Russian SFSR) (Krasnodar) | 3:41.3 | Anatoliy Mamontov (Moldavian SSR) (Chișinău) | 3:41.8 | Nikolay Andreyev (Belarusian SSR) (Grodno) | 3:41.9 |
| 5000 m | Ivan Parluy (Russian SFSR) (Smolensk) | 13:38.0 | Vladimir Zatonskiy (Russian SFSR) (Moscow Oblast) | 13:38.4 | Anatay Ibraimov (Kirghiz SSR) (Frunze) | 13:44.8 |
| 10,000 m | Enn Sellik (Estonian SSR) (Tartu) | 28:21.6 | Nikolay Puklakov (Russian SFSR) (Cheboksary) | 28:23.2 | Anatoly Badrankov (Kazakh SSR) (Alma-Ata) | 28:23.8 |
| 110 m hurdles | Viktor Myasnikov (Byelorussian SSR) (Minsk) | 13.6 | Eduard Pereverzev (Moscow) | 13.7 | Vyacheslav Kulebyakin (Leningrad) | 13.8 |
| 400 m hurdles | Yevgeniy Gavrilenko (Byelorussian SSR) (Gomel) | 49.5 | Dmitry Stukalov (Leningrad) | 50.4 | Aleksandr Karasyov (Moscow) | 50.6 |
| 3000 m SC | Vladimir Lisovskiy (Leningrad) | 8:27.6 | Nikolay Mayorov (Byelorussian SSR) (Brest) | 8:30.2 | Oleksandr Velychko (Ukrainian SSR) (Uzhhorod) | 8:32.2 |
| 4 × 100 m relay | Valery Ratushniy; Aleksey Golourniy; Vladimir Atamas; Valery Borzov; Ukrainian SSR (Ukrainian SSR) | 39.5 | Aleksandr Lebedev; Boris Izmestyev; Mikhail Lebedev; Aleksandr Kornelyuk; Moscow (Moscow) | 39.5 | Vladimir Kashirin; Nikolay Kolesnikov; Aleksandr Aksinin; Vyacheslav Kulebyakin; Leningrad Oblast (Leningrad) | 39.7 |
| 4 × 400 m relay | Yevgeny Borisenko; Valery Yurchenko; Leonid Korolyov; Semyon Kocher; Russian SFSR (Russian SFSR) | 3:07.4 | Valeriy Yudin; Aleksandr Karasyov; Pavel Litovchenko; Aleksandr Bratchikov; Moscow (Moscow) | 3:07.9 | Arkadiy Medved; Pavel Kozban; Dmitry Stukalov; Viktor Mikhailov; Leningrad Oblast (Leningrad) | 3:08.3 |

=== Road ===
| Event | Gold | | Silver | | Bronze | |
|---|---|---|---|---|---|---|
| Marathon | Grigoriy Vinyar (Leningrad) | 2:15:27.8 | Nikolay Penzin (Kazakh SSR) (Alma-Ata) | 2:15:56.0 | Aleksandr Gotsky (Belarusian SSR) (Minsk) | 2:16:32.0 |
| 20 km walk | Otto Barch (Kirghiz SSR) (Frunze) | 1:27:12.0 | Yevgeniy Ivchenko (Belarusian SSR) (Grodno) | 1:27:41.2 | Volodymyr Holubnychy (Ukrainian SSR) (Sumy) | 1:28:02.6 |
| 50 km walk | Veniamin Soldatenko (Kazakh SSR) (Alma-Ata) | 3:58:54.8 | Yevgeniy Lyungin (Moscow) | 3:58:56.2 | Vladimir Svechnikov (Moscow) | 4:03:37.4 |

=== Field ===
| Event | Gold | | Silver | | Bronze | |
|---|---|---|---|---|---|---|
| High jump | Aleksandr Grigoryev (Byelorussian SSR) (Minsk) | 2.21 | Mark Zhelnov (Ukrainian SSR) (Kryvyi Rih) | 2.18 | Serhiy Senyukov (Ukrainian SSR) (Chernivtsi) | 2.18 |
| Pole vault | Vladimir Kischkun (Leningrad) | 5.45 NR | Yury Isakov (Russian SFSR) (Sverdlovsk) Jānis Lauris (Latvian SSR) (Riga) | 5.40 | not awarded | |
| Long jump | Valeriy Podluzhniy (Ukrainian SSR) (Donetsk) | 8.02 | Tõnu Lepik (Estonian SSR) (Tallinn) | 7.75 | Aleksey Pereverzev (Moscow) | 7.69 |
| Triple jump | Viktor Saneyev (Georgian SSR) (Tbilisi) | 17.33 | Nikolay Sinichkin (Latvian SSR) (Riga) | 16.68 | Anatoliy Piskulin (Leningrad) | 16.64 |
| Shot put | Valeriy Voykin (Leningrad) | 20.02 | Aleksandr Baryshnikov (Leningrad) | 19.82 | Oleksandr Nosenko (Ukrainian SSR) (Kyiv) | 19.68 |
| Discus throw | Nikolay Vikhor (Moscow) | 61.18 | Viktor Penzikov (Russian SFSR) (Stavropol) | 60.70 | Vladimir Lyakhov (Russian SFSR) (Moscow Oblast) | 60.08 |
| Hammer throw | Valentin Dmitriyenko (Ukrainian SSR) (Zaporizhia) | 75.88 | Aleksey Spiridonov (Leningrad) | 75.56 | Aleksey Malyukov (Moscow) | 73.44 |
| Javelin throw | Nikolay Grebnyev (Byelorussian SSR) (Vitebsk) | 83.28 | Vasiliy Yershov (Ukrainian SSR) (Zaporizhia) | 83.28 | Ivan Morgol (Belarusian SSR) (Minsk) | 83.28 |

== Women's events ==
=== Track ===
| Event | Gold | | Silver | | Bronze | |
|---|---|---|---|---|---|---|
| 100 m | Lyudmila Maslakova (Moscow) | 11.3 | Nadezhda Besfamilnaya (Moscow) | 11.4 | | |
| 200 m | Nadezhda Besfamilnaya (Moscow) | 22.8 | | | | |
| 400 m | Nadezhda Ilyina (Moscow) | 51.8 | Ingrīda Barkāne (Latvian SSR) | 51.9 | Inta Kļimoviča (Latvian SSR) | 52.5 |
| 800 m | Nina Morgunova (Ukrainian SSR) | 1:59.4 | | | | |
| 1500 m | Tatyana Kazankina (Leningrad) | 4:07.9 | | | | |
| 3000 m | Raisa Katyukova (Ukrainian SSR) | 9:00.6 | | | | |
| 100 m hurdles | Natalya Lebedeva (Moscow) | 12.8 NR | | | | |
| 4 × 100 m relay | Nadezhda Besfamilnaya; Lyudmila Maslakova; Tatyana Sinyova; Vera Anisimova; Moscow (Moscow) | 43.7 | | | | |
| 4 × 400 m relay | Anna Dundere; Sarmīte Štūla; Ingrīda Barkāne; Inta Kļimoviča; Latvian SSR (Latvian SSR) | 3:30.2 | | | | |

=== Field ===
| Event | Gold | | Silver | Bronze |
|---|---|---|---|---|
| High jump | Alla Fedorchuk (Byelorussian SSR) | 1.85 | | |
| Long jump | Lidiya Alfeyeva (Moscow) | 6.67 | | |
| Shot put | Svetlana Krachevskaya (Moscow) | 21.02 | | |
| Discus throw | Faina Melnik (Moscow) | 67.80 | | |
| Javelin throw | Leolita Blodniece (Latvian SSR) | 59.54 | | |

== Combined events ==
=== Men's events ===
| Event | Gold | | Silver | Bronze |
|---|---|---|---|---|
| Decathlon | Nikolay Avilov (Ukrainian SSR) | 8229 | | |

=== Women's events ===
| Event | Gold | | Silver | Bronze |
|---|---|---|---|---|
| Pentathlon | Nadiya Tkachenko (Ukrainian SSR) | 4695 (4679) | | |
