= Aleksandr Grigoryev (athlete) =

Personal information
- Born: 7 October 1955 (age 70) Leningrad, Soviet Union

Sport
- Sport: Track and field
Medal record
Representing Soviet Union
IAAF World Cup
Bronze medal – third place	1979 Montreal	High jump
European Championships
Silver medal – second place	1978 Prague	High jump
Summer Universiade
Bronze medal – third place	1977 Sofia	High jump

Aleksandr Grigoryev (Russian: Александр Николаевич Григорьев, Belarusian: Аляксандр Мікалаевіч Грыгор'еў, romanized: Aliaksandr Mikalajevič Hryhorjeŭ; born 7 October 1955) is a former Belarusian high jumper who competed for the Soviet Union. He represented his country at the 1980 Moscow Olympics and was a seven-time Soviet champion. He was a medallist at the European Athletics Championships, IAAF World Cup and multiple times at the European Cup. He held a personal best of 2.30 m (7 ft 6 1/2 in).

Born in Saint Petersburg, he was a member of the SK VS Minsk sports club in Belarus during his career. He had his breakthrough year in 1975, winning his first national title at the Soviet Spartakiad and breaking the championship record to win the 1975 European Cup with a leap of 2.24 m (7 ft 4 in). He was also fourth at the 1975 European Athletics Indoor Championships.

Grigoryev missed the 1976 season but reappeared in 1977 to win the Soviet title indoor and outdoors, as well as taking bronze medals at that year's Universiade and European Cup. His lifetime best jump of 2.30 m (7 ft 6 1/2 in) in Riga that June ranked him third in the world. He won the Soviet indoor title with an indoor best of 2.28 m (7 ft 5 3/4 in), which was a championship record. He retained that outdoor title a year later and also broke the Soviet Athletics Championships record with 2.26 m (7 ft 4 3/4 in) outdoors. In international competition he placed fourth at the 1978 European Athletics Indoor Championships, but won the highest honour of his career at the 1978 European Athletics Championships – a silver medal behind Soviet teammate and world record holder Vladimir Yashchenko.

A third straight national title outdoors came at the 1979 Soviet Spartakiad, seeing off a challenge from American Benn Fields. He was a bronze medallist in the high jump at both the 1979 European Cup and the 1979 IAAF World Cup. He gained selection for the Soviet Union at the 1980 Summer Olympics and reached eighth in the final on home turf. He took his final national title at the 1981 Soviet Championships.

== International competitions ==
Year	Competition	Venue	Position	Notes
1975	European Indoor Championships	Katowice, Poland	4th	2.19 m
1975	European Cup	Nice, France	1st	2.24 m CR
1977	European Cup	Helsinki, Finland	3rd	2.20 m
1977	Universiade	Sofia, Bulgaria	3rd	2.19 m
1978	European Indoor Championships	Milan, Italy	4th	2.25 m
1978	European Championships	Prague, Czechoslovakia	2nd	2.28 m
1979	European Cup	Turin, Italy	3rd	2.24 m
1979	IAAF World Cup	Montreal, Canada	3rd	2.24 m
1980	Olympic Games	Moscow, Soviet Union	8th	2.21 m

== National titles ==
- Soviet Athletics Championships
  - High jump: 1975, 1977, 1978, 1979, 1981
- Soviet Indoor Athletics Championships
  - High jump: 1977, 1978

== See also ==
- List of European Athletics Championships medalists (men)
- List of high jump national champions (men)
