= 1989 IAAF World Indoor Championships – Men's high jump =

The men's high jump event at the 1989 IAAF World Indoor Championships was held at the Budapest Sportcsarnok in Budapest on 3 and 4 March.

== Medallists ==
Gold	Silver	Bronze
Javier Sotomayor; Cuba (CUB)	Dietmar Mögenburg; West Germany (FRG)	Patrik Sjöberg; Sweden (SWE)

== Results ==
=== Qualification ===
Qualification: 2.23 metres (Q) or the best 12 (q) qualified for the final

Rank	Name	Nationality	Result	Notes
1	Javier Sotomayor	Cuba	2.10	q
1	Dietmar Mögenburg	West Germany	2.10	q
1	Patrik Sjöberg	Sweden	2.10	q
1	Dalton Grant	Great Britain	2.10	q
1	Carlo Thränhardt	West Germany	2.10	q
1	Krzysztof Krawczyk	Poland	2.10	q
1	Jake Jacoby	United States	2.10	q
1	Róbert Ruffini	Czechoslovakia	2.10	q
1	Panayotis Kontaksakis	Greece	2.10	q
1	Sergey Dymchenko	Soviet Union	2.10	q
1	Georgi Dakov	Bulgaria	2.10	q
1	Jean-Charles Gicquel	France	2.10	q
1	Troy Kemp	Bahamas	2.10	q
14	Clarence Saunders	Bermuda	2.10	q
	Thomas McCants	United States	NM	

=== Final ===
Rank	Name	Nationality	2.20	2.25	2.28	2.31	2.33	2.35	2.37	2.43	Result	Notes
1st place, gold medalist(s)	Javier Sotomayor	Cuba	–	o	–	o	–	xo	o	o	2.43	WR, CR
2nd place, silver medalist(s)	Dietmar Mögenburg	West Germany	–	xo	–	xxo	–	o			2.35	
3rd place, bronze medalist(s)	Patrik Sjöberg	Sweden	–	o	–	o	–	xo			2.35	
4	Dalton Grant	Great Britain	–	o	–	o	x–	xo			2.35	NR
5	Carlo Thränhardt	West Germany	–	o	–	–	o				2.33	
6	Krzysztof Krawczyk	Poland			o	–	xx				2.28	
7	Jake Jacoby	United States	xo	xxo	o	xxx					2.28	
8	Róbert Ruffini	Czechoslovakia	o	o	xo	xxx					2.28	
9	Panayotis Kontaksakis	Greece	o	xo	xxo	xx					2.28	NR
9	Sergey Dymchenko	Soviet Union	xo	o	xxo	xxx					2.28	
11	Georgi Dakov	Bulgaria	o	o	x						2.25	
12	Jean-Charles Gicquel	France	o	xo	x						2.25	
13	Troy Kemp	Bahamas	xo	x	xxx						2.25	
14	Clarence Saunders	Bermuda	o	xxx							2.20	
