= Tin Sau =

Tin Sau may refer to:

== Places ==
- Tin Sau Bazaar, Tin Shui Wai, Hong Kong
- Tin Sau stop, an MTR Light Rail stop in Tin Shui Wai, Hong Kong

== People ==
- Lam Tin Sau (born 1963), Hong Kong athlete
