= 1984 European Athletics Indoor Championships – Men's high jump =

The men's high jump event at the 1984 European Athletics Indoor Championships was held on 3 March.

== Results ==
Rank	Name	Nationality	2.10	2.15	2.20	2.24	2.27	2.30	2.33	2.38	Result	Notes
1st place, gold medalist(s)	Dietmar Mögenburg	West Germany			o	o	o	xo	xxo	xxx	2.33	
2nd place, silver medalist(s)	Carlo Thränhardt	West Germany	–	–	o	o	–	o	xxx		2.30	
3rd place, bronze medalist(s)	Roland Dalhäuser	Switzerland			o	–	–	o	xxx		2.30	
4	Valeriy Sereda	Soviet Union									2.27	
5	Mirosław Włodarczyk	Poland									2.24	
5	Hrvoje Fižuleto	Yugoslavia									2.24	
7	Patrik Sjöberg	Sweden									2.24	
8	Igor Paklin	Soviet Union									2.20	
9	Thomas Eriksson	Sweden									2.20	
10	Sašo Apostolovski	Yugoslavia									2.20	
11	Sorin Matei	Romania									2.20	
12	Evgeni Peev	Bulgaria									2.15	
12	Krzysztof Krawczyk	Poland									2.15	
12	Mikko Levola	Finland									2.15	
15	Geoff Parsons	Great Britain									2.15	
16	Terje Totland	Norway									2.10	
17	Raymond Conzemius	Luxembourg									2.10	
18	Dominique Hernandez	France									2.10	
