= Masters M35 high jump world record progression =

This is the progression of world record improvements of the high jump M35 division of Masters athletics.

Key

Incomplete information Pending Indoor mark before 2000, not acceptable for record

Height	Athlete	Nationality	Birthdate	Location	Date
2.31	Dragutin Topić	Serbia	12.03.1971	Kragujevac	28.07.2009
2.31	James Nieto	United States	02.11.1976	New York	09.06.2012
2.30 i	Charles Austin	United States	19.12.1967	Boston	02.03.2003
2.27 i	Cristian Popescu	Romania	12.08.1962	Pireas	22.02.1998
2.26	Dalton Grant	United Kingdom	08.04.1966	Bangor	21.07.2002
2.26 i	Carlo Thränhardt	Germany	05.07.1957	Otterberg	13.02.1994
2.25	Igor Paklin	Kyrgyzstan	15.06.1963	Bishkek	10.07.1999
2.20	Doug Nordquist	United States	20.12.1958	Long Beach	08.06.1996
2.20	Brian Stanton	United States	19.02.1961	Long Beach	16.03.1996
2.17	Dimitrios Kattis	Greece	07.02.1956		06.09.1991
2.16	Viktor Bolshov	Soviet Union	23.05.1939	Moscow	21.06.1974
