= Tamberi =

Tamberi is an Italian surname from Marche and Tuscany. Notable people with the surname include:

- Gianmarco Tamberi (born 1992), Italian high jumper
- Marco Tamberi (born 1957), Italian high jumper, father of Gianmarco
