= 1986 European Athletics Championships – Men's high jump =

Men's high jump at the European Athletics Championships

These are the official results of the Men's high jump event at the 1986 European Championships in Stuttgart, West Germany, held at Neckarstadion on 30 and 31 August 1986.

== Medalists ==
| Gold | Igor Paklin; Soviet Union |
| Silver | Sergey Malchenko; Soviet Union |
| Bronze | Carlo Thränhardt; West Germany |

== Results ==
=== Qualification ===
30 August

| Rank | Name | Nationality | Result | Notes |
|---|---|---|---|---|
| | Dietmar Mögenburg | West Germany | 2.26 | Q |
| | Patrik Sjöberg | Sweden | 2.26 | Q |
| | Gerd Wessig | East Germany | 2.26 | Q |
| | Krzysztof Krawczyk | Poland | 2.26 | Q |
| | Carlo Thränhardt | West Germany | 2.26 | Q |
| | Geoff Parsons | Great Britain | 2.26 | Q |
| | Igor Paklin | Soviet Union | 2.26 | Q |
| | Ján Zvara | Czechoslovakia | 2.26 | Q |
| | Valeriy Sereda | Soviet Union | 2.26 | Q |
| | Cristian Popescu | Romania | 2.23 | q |
| | Sorin Matei | Romania | 2.23 | q |
| | Sergey Malchenko | Soviet Union | 2.23 | q |
| | Georgi Dakov | Bulgaria | 2.23 | q |
| | Bernhard Bensch | West Germany | 2.23 | q |
| | Constantin Militaru | Romania | 2.19 | |
| | Roland Dalhäuser | Switzerland | 2.19 | |
| | Markus Einberger | Austria | 2.10 | |

=== Final ===
31 August

| Rank | Name | Nationality | 2.07 | 2.12 | 2.17 | 2.21 | 2.25 | 2.28 | 2.31 | 2.34 | 2.38 | Result | Notes |
|---|---|---|---|---|---|---|---|---|---|---|---|---|---|
| 1st place, gold medalist(s) | Igor Paklin | Soviet Union | – | – | – | o | o | – | o | xxo | xxx | 2.34 | CR |
| 2nd place, silver medalist(s) | Sergey Malchenko | Soviet Union | – | – | o | o | o | xo | xxo | xxx | | 2.31 | |
| 3rd place, bronze medalist(s) | Carlo Thränhardt | West Germany | – | – | – | xo | – | xo | xxo | xxx | | 2.31 | |
| 4 | Dietmar Mögenburg | West Germany | | | | | | | xxx | | | 2.28 | |
| 5 | Krzysztof Krawczyk | Poland | – | o | o | o | o | xo | xxx | | | 2.28 | |
| 6 | Patrik Sjöberg | Sweden | | | | | | | | | | 2.25 | |
| 7 | Gerd Wessig | East Germany | | | | | | | | | | 2.25 | |
| 7 | Cristian Popescu | Romania | | | | | | | | | | 2.25 | |
| 9 | Ján Zvara | Czechoslovakia | | | | | | | | | | 2.21 | |
| 9 | Geoff Parsons | Great Britain | | | | | | | | | | 2.21 | |
| 11 | Georgi Dakov | Bulgaria | | | | | | | | | | 2.17 | |
| 11 | Bernhard Bensch | West Germany | | | | | | | | | | 2.17 | |
| 11 | Valeriy Sereda | Soviet Union | | | | | | | | | | 2.17 | |
| 14 | Sorin Matei | Romania | | | | | | | | | | 2.12 | |

== Participation ==
According to an unofficial count, 17 athletes from 11 countries participated in the event.

- Austria (1)
- Bulgaria (1)
- Czechoslovakia (1)
- East Germany (1)
- Poland (1)
- Romania (3)
- Soviet Union (3)
- Sweden (1)
- Switzerland (1)
- United Kingdom (1)
- West Germany (3)

== See also ==
- 1982 Men's European Championships High Jump (Athens)
- 1983 Men's World Championships High Jump (Helsinki)
- 1984 Men's Olympic High Jump (Los Angeles)
- 1987 Men's World Championships High Jump (Rome)
- 1988 Men's Olympic High Jump (Seoul)
- 1990 Men's European Championships High Jump (Split)
