= Hrvoje Fižuleto =

Croatian high jumper

Personal information
- Nationality: Croatian
- Born: 15 January 1963 (age 63) Zadar, Croatia, Yugoslavia

Sport
- Sport: Athletics
- Event: High jump

Hrvoje Fižuleto (born 15 January 1963) is a retired Croatian high jumper.

He finished fifth at the 1984 European Indoor Championships, tenth at the 1987 European Indoor Championships and twelfth at the 1988 European Indoor Championships. He competed in the men's high jump at the 1984 Summer Olympics, representing Yugoslavia, without reaching the final.
