= Liu Chin-chiang =

Taiwanese high jumper

Personal information
- Full name: 劉金鎗, Pinyin: Liú Jīn-qiāng
- Nationality: Taiwanese
- Born: 16 May 1958 (age 68)

Sport
- Sport: Athletics
- Event: High jump

Liu Chin-chiang (born 16 May 1958) is a Taiwanese athlete. He competed in the men's high jump at the 1984 Summer Olympics.
