= 1987 European Athletics Indoor Championships – Men's high jump =

The men's high jump event at the 1987 European Athletics Indoor Championships was held on 21 February.

== Results ==
Rank	Name	Nationality	2.10	2.15	2.20	2.24	2.27	2.30	2.33	2.36	2.38	2.42	Result	Notes
1st place, gold medalist(s)	Patrik Sjöberg	Sweden	–	–	o	–	o	o	o	o	xxo	xxr	2.38	CR
2nd place, silver medalist(s)	Carlo Thränhardt	West Germany	–	–	–	o	–	o	o	o	xxx		2.36	
3rd place, bronze medalist(s)	Gennadiy Avdeyenko	Soviet Union	–	–	o	xo	o	o	o	o	xxx		2.36	=NR
4	Ján Zvara	Czechoslovakia	–	–	xo	o	o	o	xo	–	xxx		2.33	
5	Roland Dalhäuser	Switzerland	–	–	o	–	o	o	xxx				2.30	
6	André Schneider-Laub	West Germany	–	o	o	o	xo	xxxx					2.27	
7	Dalton Grant	Great Britain	–	–	o	xxo	xxo	xxx					2.27	
8	Krzysztof Krawczyk	Poland	–	o	o	o	xxx						2.24	
8	Eugen-Cristian Popescu	Romania	–	o	o	o	xxx						2.24	
10	Hrvoje Fižuleto	Yugoslavia	o	o	o	xo	xxx						2.24	
11	Jacek Wszoła	Poland	–	–	o	x–	xx						2.20	
12	Róbert Ruffíni	Czechoslovakia	–	xo	xxx								2.15	
12	Arturo Ortiz	Spain	o	xo	–	xxx							2.15	
14	Gustavo Adolfo Becker	Spain	xxo	xxo	xxx								2.15	
