= Robert Marinov =

Bulgarian high jumper

Robert Marinov (Bulgarian: Роберт Маринов) (born February 1, 1967) is a retired Bulgarian high jumper.

He finished fifteenth at the 1987 World Championships and fourteenth at the 1992 European Indoor Championships. He also competed at the 1993 World Championships without reaching the final round. He became national champion in 1992 and 1993.

His personal best jump was 2.31 metres, achieved in July 1992 in Sofia. This ranks him second among Bulgarian high jumpers, only behind Georgi Dakov.
