= André Schneider-Laub =

German high jumper

Personal information
- Born: 12 August 1958 (age 67) Velbert, West Germany

Sport
- Sport: Track and field
Medal record
Representing West Germany
European Indoor Championships
Bronze medal – third place	1979 Vienna	High jump

André Schneider-Laub (born 12 August 1958) is a retired West German high jumper.

He won the silver medal at the 1977 European Junior Championships, finished seventh at the 1978 European Championships, won the bronze medal at the 1979 European Indoor Championships, finished sixth at the 1981 European Indoor Championships, fourth at the 1982 European Championships, sixth at the 1987 European Indoor Championships and competed without reaching the final at the 1987 World Indoor Championships.

Schneider-Laub became West German champion in 1977 and 1978, won national silver medals in 1979 and 1986 and national bronze medals in 1980, 1982, 1984, 1985 and 1988. He also took three silvers and three bronzes at the West German indoor championships. He represented the club TV Wattenscheid. His personal best jump was 2.30 metres, achieved in August 1979 in West Berlin.
