= Franck Verzy =

French high jumper (1961–2025)

Franck Verzy (French: [fʁɑ̃k vɛʁzi]; 13 May 1961 – 2 July 2025) was a French high jumper, born in Lyon.

Verzy finished 20th at the 1982 European Indoor Championships and won the bronze medal at the 1983 Mediterranean Games. He also competed at the 1982 European Championships, the 1983 World Championships and the 1984 Olympic Games without reaching the final.

He became French champion in 1982, 1984, and 1986. His personal best was 2.32 metres, achieved in 1983.

Verzy died on 2 July 2025, at the age of 64.
