= Sergey Malchenko =

Russian former track and field athlete (born 1963)

Medal record

Men's athletics

Representing the Soviet Union

European Championships
Silver medal – second place	1986 Stuttgart	High jump

Sergey Malchenko (Russian: Сергей Мальченко; born 2 November 1963) is a former Soviet track and field athlete who competed in the high jump. His personal best mark of 2.38 m (7 ft 9 1/2 in) ranks him among the top twenty high jumpers of all-time and at his peak his was the sixth best ever in the event.

He represented the Soviet Union three times in major international competition: he was the silver medallist at the European Athletics Championships in 1986, and a finalist at the 1987 World Championships in Athletics and 1989 European Athletics Indoor Championships.

His son, Eduard Malchenko, is also a professional high jumper, who has a best of 2.30 m (7 ft 6 1/2 in).

== Career ==
He began competing in the 1980s. In 1983 set a personal best of 2.29 m (7 ft 6 in) in Moscow, then jumped 2.31 m (7 ft 6 3/4 in) in Sochi in 1985. His first international success came at the 1986 European Athletics Championships, where he equalled his personal best in the high jump final to take the silver medal behind Soviet teammate Igor Paklin. The following year he was selected to represent the Soviet Union at the 1987 World Championships in Athletics but, after qualifying for the final he failed to register a height. The two other Soviets in the competition, Paklin and Hennadiy Avdyeyenko, reached the medal podium.

Following this setback, he went on to clear the greatest heights of his career. At the beginning of the 1988 indoor season he jumped 2.36 m (7 ft 8 3/4 in) in Moscow and took his first national title at the Soviet Indoor Athletics Championships. He performed well on the outdoor Soviet circuit that year, jumping an outdoor best of 2.34 m (7 ft 8 in) in Tallinn, then 2.36 m in Dnipropetrovsk. In Banská Bystrica, Czechoslovakia, he had the best mark of his career in the form of a 2.38 m (7 ft 9 1/2 in) jump – an achievement which moved him up to joint sixth place on the all-time lists. This made him the second best athlete that year, behind Javier Sotomayor who broke the men's high jump world record. He ended the year with a win at the Russian Athletics Cup in Vladivostok, jumping 2.35 m (7 ft 8 1/2 in).

Malchenko's sole international appearance the following year was at the 1989 European Athletics Indoor Championships, but he could not match his previous form and ended the competition in sixth place with a best of 2.24 m (7 ft 4 in), placing behind fellow Soviet Aleksey Yemelin among others. He competed on the IAAF Grand Prix circuit in 1990 and placed third at the DN Galan and second at the Athletissima and London Grand Prix meets. At the 1990 IAAF Grand Prix Final he came out on top with a season's best jump of 2.34 m (7 ft 8 in). He was third on points on the tour that year, behind Hollis Conway and Georgi Dakov.

He ranked within the top twenty high jumpers in 1991, having a season's best of 2.30 m. His form declined the following year, in which he jumped a best of 2.25 m (7 ft 4 1/2 in) at the Brothers Znamensky Memorial, and he retired from competition.

== Personal bests ==
- Outdoor high jump – 2.38 m (7 ft 9 1/2 in) (1988)
- Indoor high jump – 2.36 m (7 ft 8 3/4 in) (1988)

== International competition record ==
Year	Competition	Venue	Position	Event	Notes
1986	European Championships	Stuttgart, West Germany	2nd	High jump	
1987	World Championships	Rome, Italy	—	High jump	NM
1989	European Indoor Championships	The Hague, Netherlands	6th	High jump	
