= Franck Bonnet =

French high jumper

Personal information
- Born: 3 October 1954 (age 72) Villejuif, France
- Height: 197 cm (6 ft 6 in)
- Weight: 87 kg (192 lb)

Sport
- Country: France
- Sport: Athletics (track and field)
- Event: High jump

Franck Bonnet (born 3 October 1954 in Villejuif) is a retired French high jumper.

He won the 1973 European Junior Championships, finished eleventh at the 1976 European Indoor Championships thirteenth at the 1977 European Indoor Championships, fifteenth at the 1980 European Indoor Championships, fifth at the 1981 European Indoor Championships eleventh at the 1982 European Indoor Championships and eighth at the 1982 European Championships.

Bonnet became French champion in 1981 and French indoor champion in 1982. His personal best was 2.27 metres, achieved in June 1981 in Antony.
