= Roland Dalhäuser =

Swiss high jumper (born 1958)

Medal record

Men's athletics

Representing Switzerland

European Indoor Championships
Gold medal – first place	1981 Grenoble	High jump
Bronze medal – third place	1982 Milan	High jump

Roland Dalhäuser (born 12 June 1958 in Birsfelden, Basel-Country) is a retired high jumper from Switzerland. He won three medals at the European Indoor Championships and became Swiss champion nine times.

His personal best jump, which is also the Swiss record, is 2.31 metres. He jumped 2.32 metres on the indoor track.

== International competitions ==
Year	Competition	Venue	Position	Notes
Representing Switzerland
1977	European Junior Championships	Donetsk, Soviet Union	15th (q)	2.00 m
1979	European Indoor Championships	Vienna, Austria	10th	2.18 m
1980	European Indoor Championships	Sindelfingen, West Germany	8th	2.26 m
1980	Olympic Games	Moscow, Soviet Union	5th	2.24 m
1981	European Indoor Championships	Grenoble, France	1st	2.28 m
1982	European Indoor Championships	Milan, Italy	3rd	2.32 m NRi
1982	European Championships	Athens, Greece	7th	2.21 m
1983	World Championships	Helsinki, Finland	20th (q)	2.15 m
1984	European Indoor Championships	Gothenburg, Sweden	3rd	2.30 m
1984	Olympic Games	Los Angeles, United States	11th (q)	2.24 m^{1}
1986	European Championships	Stuttgart, West Germany	15th (q)	2.19 m
1987	European Indoor Championships	Liévin, France	5th	2.30 m
1987	World Indoor Championships	Indianapolis, United States	5th	2.32 m
1987	World Championships	Rome, Italy	17th (q)	2.24 m

^{1}No mark in the final

Awards
Preceded by (Switzerland) Robert Dill-Bundi	Swiss Sportsman of the Year; 1981	Succeeded by (Switzerland) Urs Freuler
