= Róbert Ruffíni =

Slovak high jumper

Personal information
- Born: 26 January 1967 (age 59) Lučenec, Czechoslovakia

Sport
- Sport: Track and field
Medal record
Representing Czechoslovakia
European Junior Championships
| Silver medal – second place | 1985 Cottbus | High jump |

Róbert Ruffíni (born 26 January 1967) is a retired high jumper who represented Czechoslovakia and later Slovakia. His personal best jump is 2.34 metres, achieved in July 1988 in Prague. This is the current Slovak record.

== Achievements ==
| Year | Competition | Venue | Position | Notes |
Representing Czechoslovakia
| 1985 | European Junior Championships | Cottbus, East Germany | 2nd | 2.24 m |
| 1986 | World Junior Championships | Athens, Greece | 5th | 2.16 m |
| 1987 | European Indoor Championships | Liévin, France | 12th | 2.15 m |
| 1987 | World Championships | Rome, Italy | 22nd (q) | 2.21 m |
| 1988 | European Indoor Championships | Budapest, Hungary | 5th | 2.27 m |
| 1988 | Olympic Games | Seoul, South Korea | 15th | 2.20 m |
| 1989 | World Indoor Championships | Budapest, Hungary | 8th | 2.28 m |
| 1989 | Universiade | Duisburg, West Germany | 10th | 2.20 m |
| 1990 | European Indoor Championships | Glasgow, United Kingdom | 10th | 2.24 m |
| 1991 | World Championships | Tokyo, Japan | 17th (q) | 2.24 m |
Representing Slovakia
| 1993 | World Championships | Stuttgart, Germany | 11th | 2.25 m |
| 1994 | European Indoor Championships | Paris, France | 20th (q) | 2.15 m |
| 1995 | World Championships | Gothenburg, Sweden | 33rd (q) | 2.10 m |
