= Liu Yunpeng =

Chinese high jumper (born 1962)

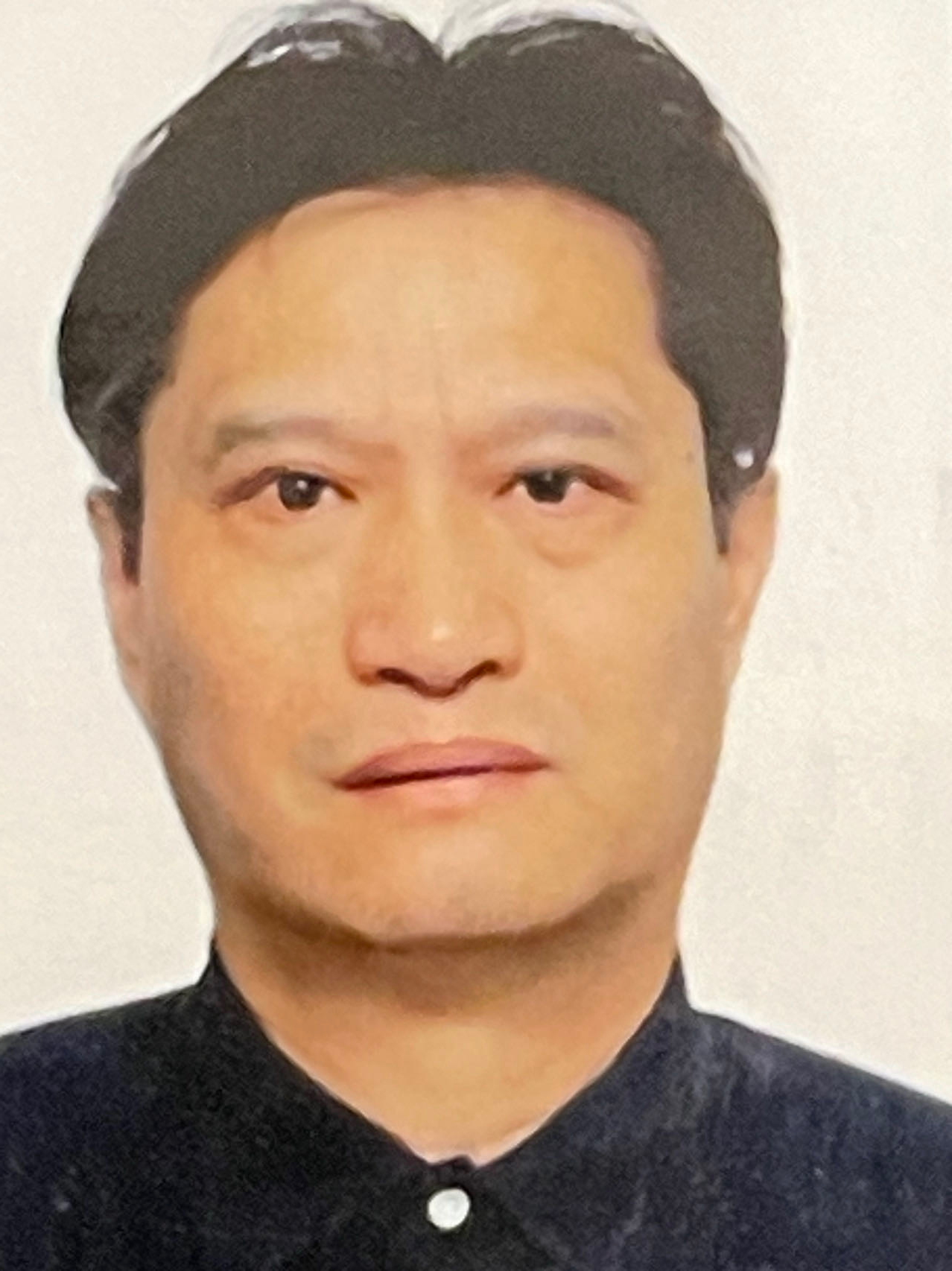
- Liu YunPeng

Medal record

Men's athletics

Representing China

Asian Championships
Gold medal – first place	1987 Singapore	High jump
Silver medal – second place	1989 New Delhi	High jump
Bronze medal – third place	1985 Jakarta	High jump

Liu Yunpeng (simplified Chinese: 刘云鹏; traditional Chinese: 劉雲鵬; pinyin: Liú Yúnpéng; born October 24, 1962) is a retired Chinese high jumper. He competed for his native country at the Los Angeles 1984 Olympics, where he cleared 2.29m and finished on 7th. His personal best is 2.30m, accomplished in 1989. He was one of the last elite high jumpers using the old-fashioned Straddle technique.

He is the father of model Ning Liu.

== International competitions ==
Year	Competition	Venue	Position	Notes
1984	Olympic Games	Los Angeles, United States	7th	2.29 m
1985	Asian Championships	Jakarta, Indonesia	3rd	2.22 m
1986	Asian Games	Seoul, South Korea	2nd	2.27 m
1987	Asian Championships	Singapore	1st	2.24 m
1989	Asian Championships	New Delhi, India	2nd	2.17 m
1989	World Cup	Barcelona, Spain	4th	2.20 m
1990	Asian Games	Beijing, China	2nd	2.20 m
