= Josep Perarnau =

Catalan priest, theologian and historian (1928–2026)

- Born: Josep Perarnau i Espelt; 8 July 1928; Avinyó, Catalonia, Spain
- Died: 1 March 2026 (aged 97)
- Education: Pontifical University of Salamanca; Sapienza University of Rome; LMU Munich
- Occupation: Priest

Josep Perarnau i Espelt (8 July 1928 – 1 March 2026) was a Catalan priest, theologian and historian.

== Life and career ==
Perarnau studied theology in the Pontifical University of Salamanca, the Sapienza University of Rome and LMU Munich. He became a priest in Barcelona. When the Faculty of Theology of Catalonia was created, he was appointed director of the seminary of theology. In this position, he worked on his historical researches. He was a member of the Institute of Catalan Studies, and in 1990, was appointed a numerary member.

He was deeply interested in the Middle Ages history, and studied medieval manuscripts, specially the ones of Catalan authors. From his position as director of the Arxiu de textos catalans antics (ATCA) (Archive of Ancient Catalan Texts) of the Institute of Catalan Studies he made valuable researches of unpublished works of the Middle Ages of authors such as Ramon Llull or Arnau de Vilanova.

Perarnau gathered all the forgeries that the 14th century inquisitor Nicolau Eimeric used in order to decree the existence of more than a hundred heresies in Ramon Llull's texts.

He was awarded the Serra d'Or Critics Prize about research, 1993; the Cultural Heritage National Prize, 1996; and the Narcís Monturiol Medal, 1998. These two last awards were given by the Generalitat de Catalunya (Catalan regional government). On 28 April 2009, he received an honorary degree from the University of Barcelona.

Perarnau died on 1 March 2026, at the age of 97.
