= Jörg Freimuth =

East German high jumper

Personal information
- Born: 10 September 1961 (age 64)
Medal record
Men's athletics
Representing East Germany
Olympic Games
Bronze medal – third place	1980 Moscow	High jump

Jörg Freimuth (born 10 September 1961 in Rathenow, Bezirk Potsdam) is a retired East German high jumper.

He won the bronze medal for East Germany in the 1980 Summer Olympics held in Moscow, Soviet Union with a jump of 2.31 metres. He retired in 1982 and started working as an electrician.

Jörg is the twin brother of decathlete Uwe Freimuth and the uncle of decathlete Rico Freimuth.
