= Adrian Proteasa =

Romanian high jumper

Medal record

Men's athletics

Representing Romania

European Indoor Championships
Bronze medal – third place	1980 Sindelfingen	High jump

Adrian Proteasa (born 1 March 1959) is a retired Romanian high jumper.

Proteasa won the bronze medal at the 1980 European Indoor Championships and finished seventh at the 1980 Olympic Games. He became national champion five times in a row, from 1977 - 1981).

His personal best jump outdoors was 2.26 metres, achieved in July 1980 in Bucharest. On the indoor track, he jumped 2.29 metres, in Sindelfingen 1980.

Proteasa is currently a high jumping coach based in Norway.
