= Dominique Hernandez =

French high jumper

Personal information
- Born: 1 August 1960 (age 65) Toulouse, France

Sport
- Sport: Track and field

Dominique Hernandez (born 1 August 1960) is a retired French high jumper.

He finished eighteenth at the 1984 European Indoor Championships fourteenth at the 1989 European Indoor Championships and won the bronze medal at the 1989 Jeux de la Francophonie. He participated at the 1981 Summer Universiade and 1985 Summer Universiade.

Hernandez became French champion in 1985 and 1988 and French indoor champion in 1984, 1988 and 1989. His personal best was 2.25 metres, achieved in August 1988 in Tours. Indoors he had 2.27 metres (Indoor French record) achieved in February 1989 in Liévin.
