= 1978 European Athletics Championships – Men's high jump =

Men's high jump at the European Athletics Championships

The men's high jump at the 1978 European Athletics Championships was held in Prague, then Czechoslovakia, at Stadion Evžena Rošického on 1 and 2 September 1978.

== Medalists ==
Gold	Vladimir Yashchenko; Soviet Union
Silver	Aleksandr Grigoryev; Soviet Union
Bronze	Rolf Beilschmidt; East Germany

== Results ==
=== Final ===
2 September

Rank	Name	Nationality	Result	Notes
1st place, gold medalist(s)	Vladimir Yashchenko	Soviet Union	2.30	CR
2nd place, silver medalist(s)	Aleksandr Grigoryev	Soviet Union	2.28	
3rd place, bronze medalist(s)	Rolf Beilschmidt	East Germany	2.28	
4	Henry Lauterbach	East Germany	2.26	
5	Carlo Thränhardt	West Germany	2.21	
6	Jacek Wszoła	Poland	2.21	
7	Andre Schneider-Laub	West Germany	2.21	
8	Josef Hrabal	Czechoslovakia	2.18	
9	Guy Moreau	Belgium	2.18	
10	Rune Almén	Sweden	2.18	
11	William Nachtegael	Belgium	2.18	
12	Jindřich Vondra	Czechoslovakia	2.15	
13	Bruno Bruni	Italy	2.15	
14	Gennadiy Belkov	Soviet Union	2.15	
14	Terje Totland	Norway	2.15	
16	Eddy Annys	Belgium	2.10	
17	Roman Moravec	Czechoslovakia	2.10	
18	Mark Naylor	Great Britain	2.10	

=== Qualification ===
1 September

Rank	Name	Nationality	Result	Notes
	Rolf Beilschmidt	East Germany	2.18	Q
	Guy Moreau	Belgium	2.18	Q
	Gennadiy Belkov	Soviet Union	2.18	Q
	Vladimir Yashchenko	Soviet Union	2.18	Q
	Carlo Thränhardt	West Germany	2.18	Q
	Andre Schneider-Laub	West Germany	2.18	Q
	Aleksandr Grigoryev	Soviet Union	2.18	Q
	Bruno Bruni	Italy	2.18	Q
	Jacek Wszoła	Poland	2.15	q
	William Nachtegael	Belgium	2.15	q
	Jindřich Vondra	Czechoslovakia	2.15	q
	Josef Hrabal	Czechoslovakia	2.15	q
	Mark Naylor	Great Britain	2.15	q
	Roman Moravec	Czechoslovakia	2.15	q
	Eddy Annys	Belgium	2.15	q
	Henry Lauterbach	East Germany	2.15	q
	Rune Almén	Sweden	2.15	q
	Terje Totland	Norway	2.15	q
	Rodolfo Bergamo	Italy	2.10	
	Paul Poaniewa	France	2.10	
	Ekrem Özdamar	Turkey	2.10	
	Jacques Aletti	France	2.10	
	Vasilios Papadimitriou	Greece	2.10	
	Brian Burgess	Great Britain	2.00	
	Ruud Wielart	Netherlands	NH	
	Massimo Di Giorgio	Italy	NH	

== Participation ==
According to an unofficial count, 26 athletes from 14 countries participated in the event.

- Belgium (3)
- Czechoslovakia (3)
- East Germany (2)
- France (2)
- Greece (1)
- Italy (3)
- Netherlands (1)
- Norway (1)
- Poland (1)
- Soviet Union (3)
- Sweden (1)
- Turkey (1)
- Great Britain (2)
- West Germany (2)
