= Lam Tin Sau =

Hong Kong high jumper

Personal information
- Nationality: Hong Konger
- Born: 26 September 1963 (age 63)

Sport
- Sport: Athletics
- Event: High jump

Lam Tin Sau (born 26 September 1963) is a Hong Kong athlete. He competed in the men's high jump at the 1984 Summer Olympics.
