= Soviet Athletics Championships =

Sports championship

- Sport: Track and field
- Founded: 1920
- Ceased: 1991
- Country: Soviet Union

The Soviet Athletics Championships (Russian: Чемпионат СССР по лёгкой атлетике) was an annual outdoor track and field competition organised by the Soviet Athletics Federation, which served as the Soviet national championship for the sport.

The early history of event traces back to two events organised by a Moscow-based skiing club: this was first held in 1920 for men only. Following the Declaration of the Creation of the USSR, the next two editions in 1923 and 1924 increased in size and were held as an All-Union sports festival. A marked increase came in 1928 when 1281 athletes competed, drawing from five Union Republics, 12 regions of the Russian SDSSR and 11 foreign delegations. The event was held consistently every year from 1943 onwards. The athletics competition was incorporated into the quadrennial Spartakiad of Peoples of the USSR during the latter event's lifespan from 1956 to 1991 (with the exception of 1986).

The event programme typically was close to that featured in the Olympic Games athletics competition, though the marathon, road racewalking, and combined track and field events were usually held at separate championships. It was common for there to be both an individual Soviet Championships and a national athletics championship for clubs.

The last Soviet Athletics Championships was hosted in Kiev in 1991 and it ceased thereafter due to the dissolution of the Soviet Union. A final shared championships was held in 1992 between the Commonwealth of Independent States, after which point the newly independent nations hosted their own national championship events.

== Editions ==
#	Year	Venue	Date	Stadium	Notes
1	1920	Moscow	20–24 June	Skiing Sports Society Stadium	
2	1922	Moscow	3–10 September	Skiing Sports Society Stadium	
3	1923	Moscow	1–8 September		
4	1924	Moscow	31 August – 1 September		
5	1927	Moscow	20–28 August		
6	1928	Moscow	11–21 August	Food Union Stadium	
7	1931	Moscow	15–19 June	Central Dynamo Stadium	
8	1934	Moscow	1–6 August	Central Dynamo Stadium	
9	1935	Moscow	11–12 September	Central Dynamo Stadium	
10	1936	Moscow	18–24 August	Central Dynamo Stadium	
11	1937	Moscow	20–24 August	Central Dynamo Stadium	
12	1938	Kharkiv	20–24 August	Dynamo Stadium	
13	1939	Kharkiv	24–30 August	Dynamo Stadium	
14	1940	Moscow	20–24 August	Central Dynamo Stadium	
15	1943	Gorky	3–9 September	Dynamo Stadium	
16	1944	Moscow	13–18 August	Central Dynamo Stadium	
17	1945	Kiev	9–16 September	Republican Stadium	
18	1946	Dnepropetrovsk	8–15 September	Steel Stadium	
19	1947	Kharkiv	20 August – 5 September	Dynamo Stadium	
20	1948	Kharkiv	5–12 September	Dynamo Stadium	
21	1949	Moscow	3–9 September	Central Dynamo Stadium	
22	1950	Kiev	17–23 September	Republican Stadium	
23	1951	Minsk	26 August – 1 September	Dinamo Stadium	
24	1952	Leningrad	24–30 August	Kirov Stadium	
25	1953	Moscow	23–25 August	Central Dynamo Stadium	
26	1954	Kiev	12–16 September	Republican Stadium	
27	1955	Tbilisi	13–17 November	Dinamo Stadium	
28	1956	Moscow	5–16 August	Central Lenin Stadium	
29	1957	Moscow	28 August – 2 September	Central Lenin Stadium	
30	1958	Tallinn Tbilisi	19–21 July 28 October – 2 November	Kalevi Keskstaadion Dinamo Stadium	
31	1959	Moscow	9–14 August	Central Lenin Stadium	
32	1960	Moscow Kiev	15–18 July 15–19 October	Central Lenin Stadium Central Stadium	
33	1961	Tbilisi	5–9 October	Dinamo Stadium	
34	1962	Moscow Tashkent	11–13 August 13–19 October	Central Lenin Stadium Pakhtakor Markaziy Stadium	
35	1963	Moscow	9–15 August	Central Lenin Stadium	
36	1964	Kiev	27–30 August	Republican Stadium	
37	1965	Almaty	9–17 October	Almaty Central Stadium	
38	1966	Dnepropetrovsk Leninakan	12–14 August 4–6 October	Meteor Stadium City Stadium	
39	1967	Moscow	28 July – 1 August	Central Lenin Stadium	
40	1968	Sevan Leninakan Tsaghkadzor Yalta	12–13 August 15–18 August 21–22 August 15 October		
41	1969	Noginsk Kiev Uzhhorod Sochi	19 July 1969 17–20 August 15–16 October 1–2 November	Noginsk City Stadium Central Stadium Avanhard Stadium Central Stadium South	
42	1970	Minsk Fryazino	12–14 September 12–13 September	Dinamo Stadium	
43	1971	Moscow	16–19 July	Central Lenin Stadium	
44	1972	Moscow	14–20 July	Central Lenin Stadium	
45	1973	Moscow	4–14 July	Central Lenin Stadium	
46	1974	Moscow	6–7 July 23–26 July	Central Lenin Stadium	
47	1975	Moscow	27–30 July	Central Lenin Stadium	
48	1976	Kiev Klaipėda Yerevan	10–24 June 15 August 26–29 August	Republican Stadium City streets Hrazdan Stadium	
49	1977	Moscow Riga	26–29 July 2–3 July	Central Lenin Stadium Dinamo Stadium	
50	1978	Moscow Donetsk Tbilisi	25 June 29–30 July 15–18 September	City streets Lokomotiv Stadium Dinamo Stadium	
51	1979	Moscow	21–29 July	Central Lenin Stadium	
52	1980	Moscow Donetsk	29–21 June 6–9 September	Central Lenin Stadium Lokomotiv Stadium	
53	1981	Leningrad Leningrad Moscow	24–26 July 1–2 August 16–19 September	Lenin Stadium Central Lenin Stadium	
54	1982	Moscow Leningrad (Kiev)			
55	1983	Moscow			
56	1984	Donetsk	7–9 September	Lokomotiv Stadium	
57	1985	Leningrad			
58	1986	Moscow Kiev			
59	1987	Moscow Mogilev Cheboksary Novopolotsk Bryansk Tallinn	12 June 12 June 12 July 16–19 July 18–19 July	Start & finish at Desna Stadium	
60	1988	Kiev			
61	1989	Leningrad			
62	1990	Kiev			
63	1991	Kiev			

== See also ==
- List of Soviet records in athletics
