= Carlo Thränhardt =

German high jumper

Personal information
- Born: 5 July 1957 (age 69) Bad Lauchstadt, Saxony-Anhalt, East Germany
Medal record
Men's athletics
Representing West Germany
European Championships
Bronze medal – third place	1986 Stuttgart	High jump
European Indoor Championships
Gold medal – first place	1983 Budapest	High jump
Silver medal – second place	1981 Grenoble	High jump
Silver medal – second place	1984 Gothenburg	High jump
Silver medal – second place	1986 Madrid	High jump
Silver medal – second place	1987 Lievin	High jump

Carlo Thränhardt (German pronunciation: [ˈkaʁlo ˈtʁɛːnˌhaʁt], audio; born 5 July 1957) is a retired German high jumper. He excelled at indoor competitions, setting the world indoor record on three occasions between 1984 and 1988. His best mark of 2.42 metres ranks him second on the indoor all-time list one-centimetre behind world record holder Javier Sotomayor of Cuba. The only superior outdoor performances are Sotomayor's world record of 2.45 m, and Mutaz Essa Barshim's clearance of 2.43 m in 2014. Like all modern high jumpers, Thränhardt used the Fosbury Flop style, but of the 16 men in history to have cleared 2.40 m or higher, he was only the second to do so jumping off his right leg. The first was Igor Paklin. At the European Indoor Championships, he won a gold medal in 1983 and four silver medals (1981,84, 86,87). Outdoors, his best championship result was winning a bronze medal at the 1986 European Championships. He also reached the Olympic finals in 1984 and 1988.

== Career ==
Thränhardt was born in Bad Lauchstadt, Saxony-Anhalt. He won the British AAA Championships title in the high jump event at the 1980 AAA Championships and achieved his personal best performance in outdoor competitions with 2.37 m on 2 September 1984 in Rieti. This result is also the German outdoor record.

Thränhardt was particularly well known for his prowess during the indoor track & field seasons. He set a total of three world indoor records. His first record jump was recorded on February 24, 1984, in the Schöneberger sports hall during which he achieved a mark of 2.37m. On January 16, 1987, in Simmerath, Germany he became the first man to clear 2.40 m indoors. This mark bested his countryman Dietmar Mögenburg's record of 2.39 m set in Cologne, Germany (1985).

On February 26, 1988, he set his last world indoor record of 2.42 m in the Schöneberger sports hall. By this time, the requirement for a roofless arena had recently been stricken from the world record (commonly known as "world outdoor record") rules, so this mark was also recognised as equalling Patrik Sjöberg's world record. It remained a world record until September 1988, when it was beaten by Javier Sotomayor (2.43 m), and a world indoor record until March 1989, when Sotomayor repeated this performance indoors. In 1990, roofs were again banned for world records, and Thränhardt's 2.42 m was retroactively removed from all official outdoor record and performance lists. Although roofs have once again been allowed (from 1998), this record (which would still be a European record shared with Sjöberg, as well as the German record) has not been retroactively reinstated. The second highest jump ever indoors, it remains the European indoor record.

Jumping as a masters athlete, Thränhardt set the M55 World Record at 1.87 m at the Flopfest meet in Eberstadt, Germany.

Carlo Thränhardt was firstly a member of ASV Köln, later moving to LG Bayer Leverkusen. He had a match weight of 85 kg (187 lb) and is 1.99 m (6 ft 6 in) tall.

In 2004 he participated in the RTL version of I'm a Celebrity, Get Me Out of Here!.

He holds the world record in the Masters 55 age group. He set this world record on 24 August 2013 in Eberstadt with 1.90 m. This was an improvement on his former world record of 1.88 m also set in 2013.

== National titles ==
- West German Athletics Championships
  - High jump: 1986
- West German Indoor Athletics Championships
  - High jump: 1977, 1978, 1985, 1986, 1987, 1988
- German Indoor Athletics Championships
  - High jump: 1991

== International competitions ==
Year	Competition	Venue	Position	Notes
Representintg West Germany
1977	European Indoor Championships	San Sebastián, Spain	9th	2.19 m
1977	World Cup	Düsseldorf, West Germany	4th	2.21 m
1978	European Indoor Championships	Milan, Italy	9th	2.18 m
1978	European Championships	Prague, Czechoslovakia	5th	2.21 m
1980	European Indoor Championships	Sindelfingen, West Germany	4th	2.26 m
1980	Liberty Bell Classic	Philadelphia, United States	3rd	2.22 m
1981	European Indoor Championships	Grenoble, France	2nd	2.25 m
1982	European Indoor Championships	Milan, Italy	6th	2.22 m
1983	European Indoor Championships	Budapest, Hungary	1st	2.32 m
1983	World Championships	Helsinki, Finland	7th	2.26 m
1984	European Indoor Championships	Gothenburg, Sweden	2nd	2.30 m
1984	Olympic Games	Los Angeles, United States	10th	2.15 m (2.24)
1986	European Indoor Championships	Madrid, Spain	2nd	2.31 m
1986	European Championships	Stuttgart, West Germany	3rd	2.31 m
1987	European Indoor Championships	Lievin, France	2nd	2.36 m
1987	World Indoor Championships	Indianapolis, United States	—	NM (2.24)
1987	World Championships	Rome, Italy	8th	2.29 m
1988	European Indoor Championships	Budapest, Hungary	8th	2.24 m
1988	Olympic Games	Seoul, South Korea	7th	2.31 m
1989	World Indoor Championships	Budapest, Hungary	5th	2.31 m
1990	European Championships	Split, Yugoslavia	20th (q)	2.20 m

Notes:
- NM = no mark
- Results with a (q) indicate overall position in qualifying round.
- Results in parentheses indicate height achieved in qualifying round.

Records
Preceded by Dietmar Mögenburg; Patrik Sjöberg	Men's High Jump Indoor World Record Holder; January 16, 1987 – February 1, 1987; February 26, 1988 – March 4, 1989	Succeeded by Patrik Sjöberg; Javier Sotomayor
Preceded by Dietmar Mögenburg; Patrik Sjöberg	Men's High Jump European Indoor Record Holder; January 16, 1987 – February 1, 1987; February 26, 1988 – (shared with Ivan Ukhov from February 24, 2014)	Succeeded by Patrik Sjöberg; Incumbent
