= Erkki Niemi =

Finnish high jumper (born 1962)

Erkki Olavi Niemi (born 18 April 1962 in Vaasa) is a retired high jumper from Finland. He competed for his native country at the 1984 Summer Olympics, finishing in 9th place (2.24 metres).
