= Dimitrios Kattis =

Greek high jumper

Personal information
- Born: 7 February 1956 (age 70) Athens, Greece

Sport
- Sport: Track and field

Dimitrios Kattis (Δημήτριος Καττής) (born 7 February 1956) is a Greek athlete who specializes in the high jump. He competed in the 1984 Olympics, clearing 2.15m but not advancing to the final round. Earlier that year competing for Panathinaikos, Athina, he was also the Greek national champion in the event, clearing 2.24m that year. He also competed in the 1982 European Athletics Indoor Championships and the 1985 IAAF World Indoor Games.

He continued jumping. In 1991, he jumped 2.17m, higher than his Olympic performance, at age 35. His mark surpassed the 1974 mark of Soviet Viktor Bolshov to become the new Masters M35 World Record.
