= Tibor Gerstenbrein =

Hungarian high jumper

Tibor Gerstenbrein (born 2 August 1955) is a retired Hungarian high jumper.

He finished eighteenth at the 1981 European Indoor Championships, and thirteenth at the 1983 European Indoor Championships. He became Hungarian high jump champion both indoor and outdoor in 1982.

His personal bests in the event are 2.23 metres outdoors and 2.24 metres indoors, both set in Budapest in 1981.
