= Don Jacoby =

American trumpeter

- Born: May 28, 1920; York, Pennsylvania
- Died: December 25, 1992 (aged 72)
- Other names: Jake
- Occupations: Trumpeter, teacher, band leader and author

Don "Jake" Jacoby was a noted trumpeter, teacher, band leader and author who died December 25, 1992, at the age of seventy-two. He played with Benny Goodman, Les Brown, did session work for CBS, NBC and soloed at Carnegie Hall. In addition, he did a great deal of recording session work in Dallas, Texas, where he also performed with his own groups, and served for a time as president of the A.F. of M., Local 147.

== Formative years ==
Jacoby was born in York, Pennsylvania and learned to play trumpet from an uncle at six years old. He was one of the youngest players ever accepted to the famous E. S. Williams school. While still in his teens he often played the Herbert L. Clarke parts in the John Philip Sousa band in concerts in Central Park.

== Music career ==
Jacoby spent much of his life teaching and presenting clinics for Conn. During this time, he recorded several albums such as "Have Conns Will Travel," "Don Jacoby & College All-Stars Swinging Big Sound LP" and "Jacoby Brings The House Down."

He spent the last years of his life teaching private students and writing a trumpet book, "Jake's Method." Jacoby taught in Denton, Texas, and tutored many very successful brass players including Bobby Shew, Marvin Stamm, Craig Johnson, Dan Miller, and Jim Rotondi.

He was listed as one of the top players of the twentieth century in Dr. Nobel's book, “The Psychology of Cornet & Trumpet Playing," and he was mentioned in "The Secret of Technique Preservation," which was written by his teacher E. S. Williams.

== Artistic works ==
- Batista, Albert (1990). Jake's Method: the trumpet method of Don "Jake" Jacoby. Denton, Tex.: Jockobotz Publisher.
