= Thomas Eriksson (high jumper) =

Per Thomas Eriksson (born 1 May 1963 in Arbrå, Gävleborg) is a retired male high jumper from Sweden. He also competed in the men's triple jump during his career.

He finished ninth at the 1984 European Indoor Championships. He became Swedish champion in 1990 and 1991, and also has four gold medals in long and triple jump. He represented the sports clubs Turebergs FK and Arbrå IK. He became NCAA champion in 1985 for Lamar University.

His personal highest jump was 2.32 metres, achieved in June 1985 in Austin.

== Achievements ==
Year	Competition	Venue	Position	Event	Notes
Representing Sweden
1982	European Championships	Athens, Greece	9th	High jump	2.18 m
1984	European Indoor Championships	Gothenburg, Sweden	9th	High jump	2.20 m
1984	Olympic Games	Los Angeles, United States	13th (q)	High jump	2.21 m
1984	Olympic Games	Los Angeles, United States	18th (q)	Triple jump	15.97 m
1986	European Championships	Stuttgart, West Germany	21st (q)	Triple jump	15.79 m
1990	European Championships	Split, Yugoslavia	16th (q)	High jump	2.20 m
