= Janusz Trzepizur =

Polish high jumper

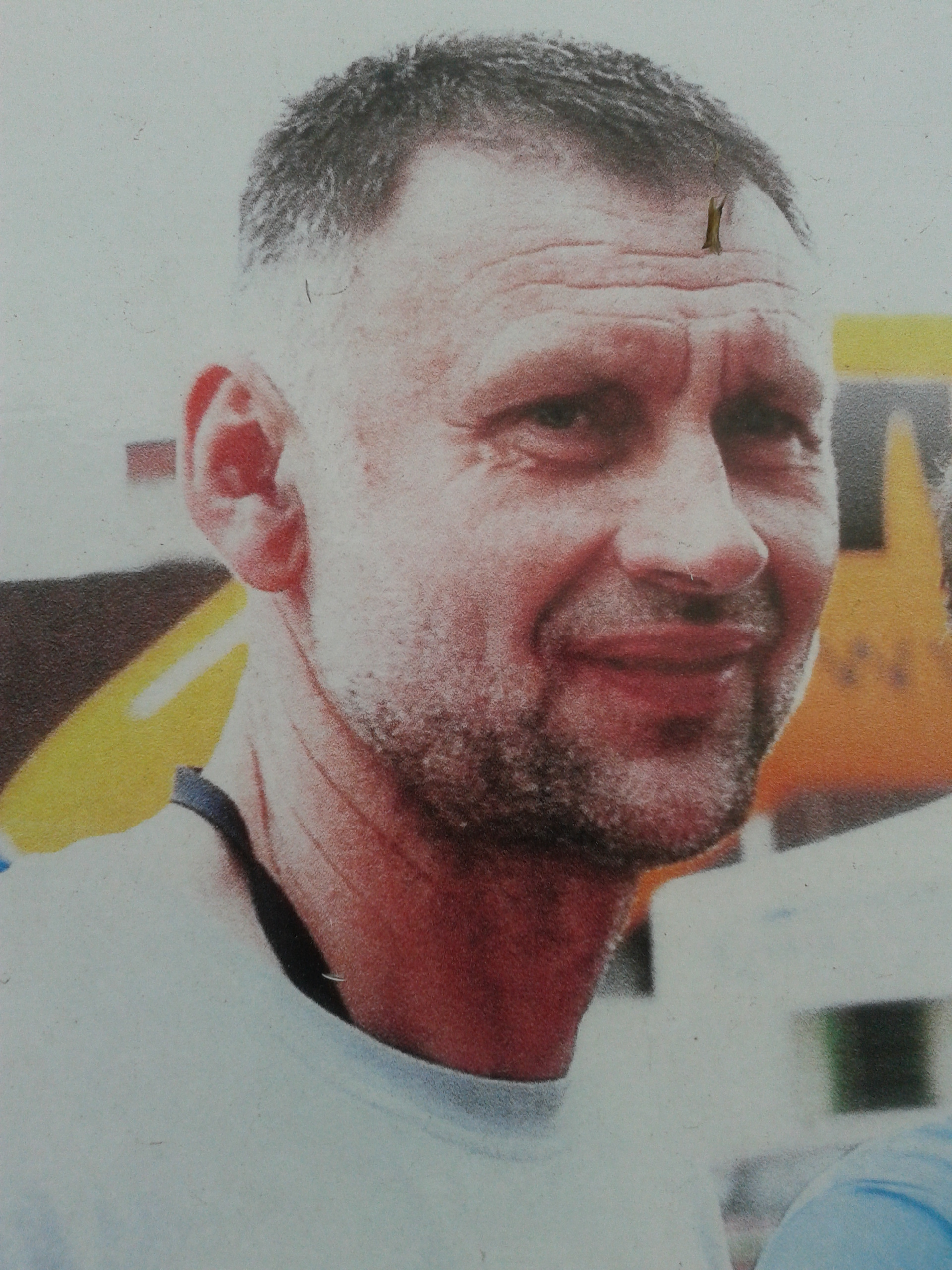

Personal information
- Nationality: Polish
- Born: 21 May 1959 Namysłów, Poland
- Died: Poland

Sport
- Event: High jump
Medal record
Men's athletics
Representing Poland
European Championships
Silver medal – second place	1982 Athens	High jump
European Indoor Championships
Silver medal – second place	1982 Milan	High jump

Janusz Roman Trzepizur (born 21 May 1959 in Namysłów) is a retired high jumper from Poland. He won a silver medal at the 1982 European Indoor Championships and the 1982 European Championships, both times finishing behind Dietmar Mögenburg of West Germany.

== Achievements ==
Year	Tournament	Venue	Result	Extra
1980	Olympic Games	Moscow, Soviet Union	12th	
1982	European Indoor Championships	Milan, Italy	2nd	
1982	European Championships	Athens, Greece	2nd	

Personal Bests:

Outdoor: 2,30 m, 30.5.1982, Eberstadt Indoor: 2,32 m, 6.3.1982, Milano
