= Krzysztof Krawczyk (athlete) =

Polish high jumper

Personal information
- Full name: Krzysztof Piotr Krawczyk
- Born: 28 January 1962 Wałbrzych, Poland
- Height: 1.86 m (6 ft 1 in)
- Weight: 76 kg (168 lb)

Sport
- Sport: Athletics
- Event: High jump
- Club: Górnik Wałbrzych; AZS Wrocław

Krzysztof Krawczyk (born 28 January 1962 in Wałbrzych) is a Polish former high jumper. He represented his country at the 1988 Summer Olympics as well as one outdoor and two indoor World Championships. In addition he was the European Junior Champion in 1981.

His personal bests in the event are 2.32 metres outdoors (Lublin 1988) and 2.30 metres indoors (Budapest 1987).

== International competitions ==
Year	Competition	Venue	Position	Notes
Representing Poland
1981	European Indoor Championships	Grenoble, France	6th	2.19 m
1981	European Junior Championships	Utrecht, Netherlands	1st	2.26 m
1984	European Indoor Championships	Gothenburg, Sweden	12th	2.15 m
1985	World Indoor Games	Paris, France	7th	2.21 m
1986	European Indoor Championships	Madrid, Spain	6th	2.24 m
1986	European Championships	Stuttgart, West Germany	5th	2.28 m
1987	European Indoor Championships	Liévin, France	8th	2.24 m
1987	Universiade	Zagreb, Yugoslavia	6th	2.24 m
1987	World Championships	Rome, Italy	12th	2.24 m
1988	Olympic Games	Seoul, South Korea	12th	2.31 m
1989	World Indoor Championships	Budapest, Hungary	6th	2.28 m
