= Milton Goode =

American high jumper (born 1960)

Milton Goode (born February 16, 1960, in Tinton Falls, New Jersey) is a retired high jumper from the United States, who participated at the 1984 Summer Olympics in Los Angeles, California.

Goode was raised in Tinton Falls, New Jersey, and attended Monmouth Regional High School, where he jumped 6 feet 2 inches (1.88 m).The first time he ever encountered the high jump was during a demonstration by his physical education instructor in High School, later setting the school record, jumping 7 feet 2 1/4 inches (2.191 m). After graduating from high school in 1979, he moved to Florida, and then California pursuing his athletic career at Alameda Junior College (now known as College of Alameda).

While in California he became a professional jumper, and qualified in the United States Olympic Trials to become a part of the U.S. team. His highlight was a personal best jump of 7 feet 8 1/4 inches (2.343 m).

Goode has been a resident of Freehold Township, New Jersey.
