= 1987 World Championships in Athletics – Men's high jump =

These are the official results of the Men's High Jump event at the 1987 IAAF World Championships in Rome, Italy. There were a total of 38 participating athletes, with two qualifying groups and the final held on Sunday September 6, 1987.

== Medalists ==
Gold	Patrik Sjöberg; Sweden (SWE)
Silver	Igor Paklin; Soviet Union (URS)
Silver	Hennadiy Avdyeyenko; Soviet Union (URS)

== Schedule ==
- All times are Central European Time (UTC+1)

Qualification Round
Group A	Group B
05.09.1987 – ??:??h	05.09.1987 – ??:??h
Final Round
06.09.1987 – 16:30h

== Abbreviations ==
- All results shown are in metres

Q	automatic qualification
q	qualification by rank
DNS	did not start
NM	no mark
WR	world record
AR	area record
NR	national record
PB	personal best
SB	season best

== Records ==
Standing records prior to the 1987 World Athletics Championships
World Record	Patrik Sjöberg (SWE)	2.42 m	June 30, 1987	Stockholm, Sweden
Event Record	Hennadiy Avdyeyenko (URS)	2.32 m	August 13, 1983	Helsinki, Finland
Broken records during the 1987 World Athletics Championships
Event Record	Patrik Sjöberg (SWE)	2.38 m	September 6, 1987	Rome, Italy

== Results ==
=== Qualifying round ===
- Held on Saturday 1987-09-05

Rank	Group	Name	Nationality	2.10	2.15	2.18	2.21	2.24	2.27	Result	Notes
1	A	Patrik Sjöberg	Sweden							2.27	q
1	A	Tom McCants	United States							2.27	q
1	A	Carlo Thränhardt	West Germany							2.27	q
1	A	Ján Zvara	Czechoslovakia							2.27	q
1	A	Sergey Malchenko	Soviet Union							2.27	q
6	A	Zhu Jianhua	China							2.24	
6	A	Luca Toso	Italy							2.24	
6	A	Roland Dalhäuser	Switzerland							2.24	
9	A	Lee Balkin	United States							2.21	
9	A	Georgi Dakov	Bulgaria							2.21	
11	A	Markus Einberger	Austria							2.18	
12	A	Sašo Apostolovski	Yugoslavia							2.10	
12	A	Motochika Inoue	Japan							2.10	
12	A	Jean-Charles Gicquel	France							2.10	
12	A	Milton Francisco	Brazil							2.10	
	A	Fakhredin Fouad	Jordan							NM	
	A	Hilaire Onwanlele	Gabon							NM	
1	B	Geoff Parsons	Great Britain							2.27	q
1	B	Sorin Matei	Romania							2.27	q
1	B	Javier Sotomayor	Cuba							2.27	q
1	B	Robert Marinov	Bulgaria							2.27	q
1	B	Clarence Saunders	Bermuda							2.27	q
1	B	Arturo Ortiz	Spain							2.27	q
1	B	Krzysztof Krawczyk	Poland							2.27	q
1	B	Dietmar Mögenburg	West Germany							2.27	q
1	B	Gerd Nagel	West Germany							2.27	q
1	B	Igor Paklin	Soviet Union							2.27	q
1	B	Hennadiy Avdyeyenko	Soviet Union							2.27	q
12	B	Jerome Carter	United States							2.24	
12	B	Troy Kemp	Bahamas							2.24	
14	B	Róbert Ruffini	Czechoslovakia							2.21	
15	B	Othmane Belfaa	Algeria							2.15	
15	B	Mikko Levola	Finland							2.15	
15	B	Paul Ngadjadoum	Chad							2.15	

=== Final ===
Rank	Name	Nationality	2.10	2.15	2.20	2.25	2.29	2.32	2.35	2.38	2.40	Result	Notes
1st place, gold medalist(s)	Patrik Sjöberg	Sweden	–	–	–	o	–	o	o	o	xxx	2.38	CR
2nd place, silver medalist(s)	Igor Paklin	Soviet Union	–	–	o	o	xo	o	xo	xxo	xxx	2.38	CR
2nd place, silver medalist(s)	Hennadiy Avdyeyenko	Soviet Union	–	–	o	o	o	o	xxo	xxo	xxx	2.38	CR
4	Dietmar Mögenburg	West Germany	–	–	–	o	o	o	o	x–	xx	2.35	
5	Clarence Saunders	Bermuda	–	–	o	o	o	o	xxx			2.32	
6	Sorin Matei	Romania	–	–	o	xxo	o	o	x–	xx		2.32	
7	Ján Zvara	Czechoslovakia	–	o	o	o	o	xxo	xxx			2.32	
8	Carlo Thränhardt	West Germany	–	–	o	o	o	xxx				2.29	
9	Javier Sotomayor	Cuba	–	–	o	o	xo	xx				2.29	
10	Krzysztof Krawczyk	Poland	–	o	o	o	xxx					2.25	
10	Geoff Parsons	Great Britain	–	o	–	o	xxx					2.25	
12	Tom McCants	United States	–	–	o	xo	xxx					2.25	
12	Arturo Ortiz	Spain	–	o	o	xo	xxx					2.25	
14	Gerd Nagel	West Germany	–	–	o	xxx						2.20	
15	Robert Marinov	Bulgaria	o	o	xo	xxx						2.20	
	Sergey Malchenko	Soviet Union	–	xxx								NM	

== See also ==
- 1983 Men's World Championships High Jump (Helsinki)
- 1984 Men's Olympic High Jump (Los Angeles)
- 1984 Men's Friendship Games High Jump (Moscow)
- 1986 Men's European Championships High Jump (Stuttgart)
- 1988 Men's Olympic High Jump (Seoul)
- 1990 Men's European Championships High Jump (Split)
- 1991 Men's World Championships High Jump (Tokyo)
