= Zoltán Társi =

Hungarian high jumper

Zoltán Társi (born 20 May 1961) is a retired Hungarian high jumper.

He was born in Oroszlány. He became Hungarian high jump champion in 1980, and competed at the 1980 European Indoor Championships and the 1980 Summer Olympics, but without reaching the final round.

His personal best jump was 2.24 metres, achieved in 1980.

== See also ==
- József Jámbor – who was the Hungarian high jump champion in 1979.
