= Gennady Ivanov =

Soviet serial killer, rapist and robber

- Born: Gennady Ivanovich Ivanov; 1947; Chuvash ASSR, RSFSR
- Died: 1982 (aged 34–35); USSR
- Cause of death: Execution by shooting
- Other names: "The Gorky Maniac" "The King" "The Beast"
- Conviction: Murder
- Penalty: Death

Details
- Victims: 8
- Span of crimes: 1973–1980
- Country: Soviet Union
- States: Nizhny Novgorod, Chuvash ASSR
- Date apprehended: Autumn 1980

Gennady Ivanovich Ivanov (Russian: Генна́дий Ива́нович Ивано́в; 1947 – 1982), known as The Gorky Maniac (Russian: Горьковский маньяк), was a Soviet serial killer, rapist and robber, active during 1980 in the city of Gorky.

In most murders, he killed his victims by inflicting numerous blows with a knife, including one to the neck, which caused the victim's death.

== Biography ==
Gennady Ivanov was born in 1947 in the Chuvash ASSR, and later served in Baikonur as part of a secret military service. After demobilization, approximately in 1973, he committed his first murder during a domestic quarrel, for which he was sentenced to 10 years in prison. He collaborated with the colony's administration, and thanks to denunciations, in 1980, 7 years after his conviction, he was granted parole. He got a job at GAZ, but soon quit, beginning to commit crimes in the autumn of 1980.

The first instance was at night, when Ivanov tried to rape a girl named Anna Kovaleva, but she was saved by passers-by. That same night, he made another unsuccessful attack on another girl. The second victim received several knife wounds but survived and was able to describe her assailant. After two weeks, Ivanov raped and killed Nina Sinitsyna, stealing 200 rubles from her. With this money, he bought himself new clothes, and, pretending to be a public toilet cleaner, entered a cubicle and changed his bloodied clothing. A few days later, Ivanov killed a man and took his shoes, leaving his own at the crime scene. On the same day, he killed another man, Konstantin Aleksandrov, stealing 1100 rubles and another pair of shoes from his victim.

A few weeks later, he attacked two girls who were using a payphone. One of them, 28-year-old Nadezhda Slepova, was killed by the suffered knife wounds. The second girl, although heavily injured, was able to escape, but died from her wounds at the hospital. Before her death, the victim managed to describe her assailant.

Soon after, Ivanov killed a WWII veteran, which spread panic around the city. Later, in the village of Vurnary in the Chuvash ASSR, he killed a woman during a domestic quarrel. On that same day, he committed another rape, after which he was detained. During a search of his home, women's jewellery belonging to his victims were located there.

During interrogations, Ivanov constantly called himself "The King" - now in the jungle, now in the underworld. He was sentenced to death by firing squad, and in 1982, the sentence was carried out.

=== In the media ===
- Documentary film from the series "The investigation was conducted..." - "The king of the jungle"
- Documentary film from the series "Legends of the Soviet Investigation" - "Operation 'The Beast'"

== See also ==
- List of Russian serial killers
