= Paolo Borghi =

Italian high jumper

Personal information
- Nationality: Italian
- Born: 27 November 1961 (age 64) Spresiano, Italy
- Height: 1.85 m (6 ft 1 in)
- Weight: 72 kg (159 lb)

Sport
- Country: Italy
- Sport: Athletics
- Event: High jump
- Club: Atalanta Spresiano

Achievements and titles
- Personal best: High jump: 2.28 m (1980)

Paolo Borghi (born 27 November 1961) is a retired Italian high jumper.

== Biography ==
He competed at the 1980 Olympic Games, without reaching the final. His personal best jump is 2.28 metres, achieved in May 1980 in Santa Lucia di Piave.

== Olympic results ==
Year	Competition	Venue	Position	Event	Performance	Notes
1980	Olympic Games	(Soviet Union) Moscow	Qual.	High jump	2.18 m	

== National titles ==
Paolo Borghi has won one time the individual national championship.

- 1 win in High jump (1984)

== See also ==
- Men's high jump Italian record progression
