= Dietmar Mögenburg =

German high jumper

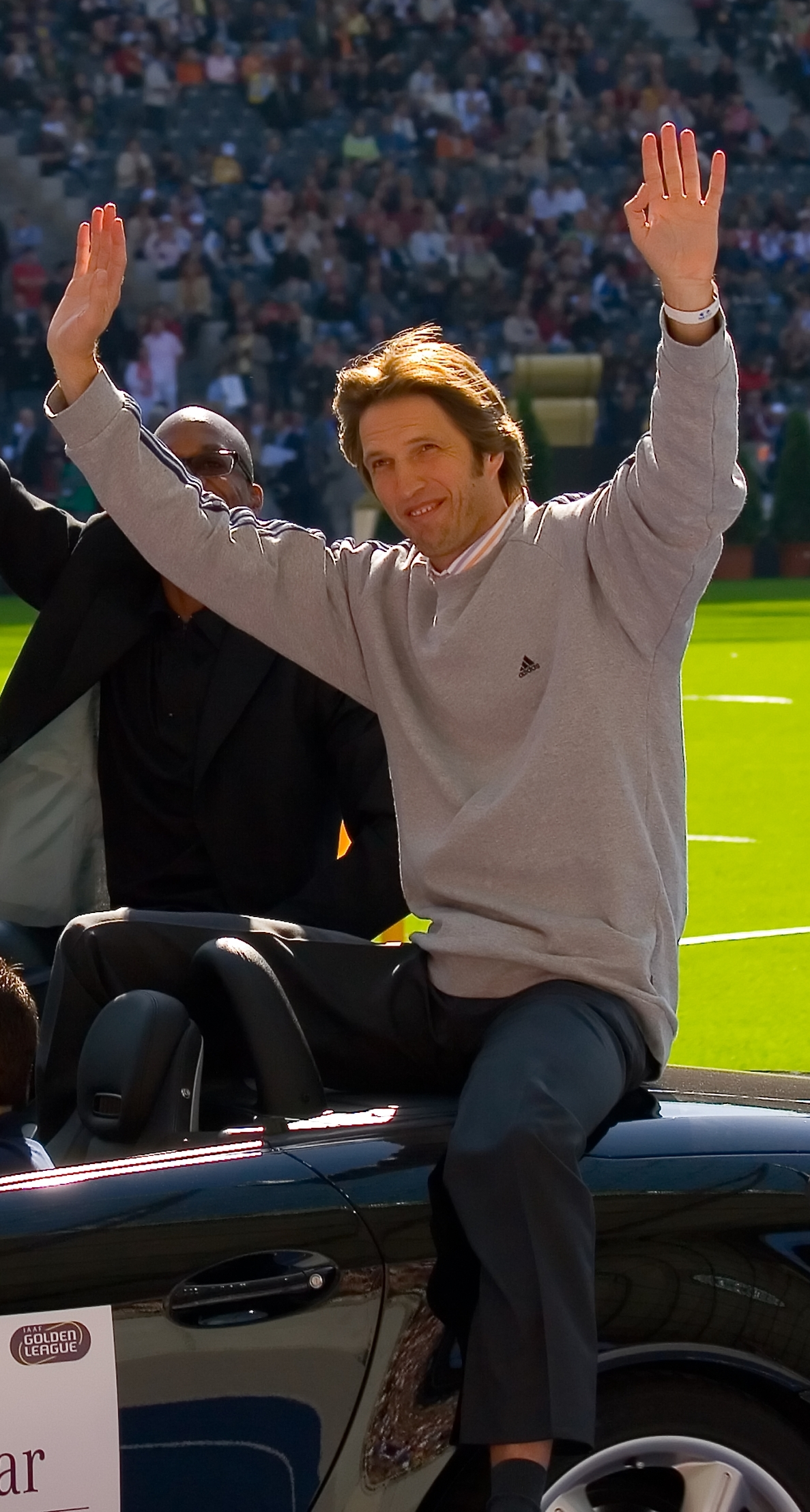

Personal information
- Born: 15 August 1961 (age 64) Leverkusen, West Germany
- Height: 2.01 m (6 ft 7 in)
- Weight: 78 kg (172 lb)

Achievements and titles
- Personal bests: 2.36 m 2.39 m (indoor)
Medal record
Men's athletics
Representing West Germany
Olympic Games
Gold medal – first place	1984 Los Angeles	High jump
World Indoor Championships
Silver medal – second place	1989 Budapest	High jump
European Championships
Gold medal – first place	1982 Athens	High jump
European Indoor Championships
Gold medal – first place	1980 Sindelfingen	High Jump
Gold medal – first place	1982 Milan	High Jump
Gold medal – first place	1984 Gothenburg	High Jump
Gold medal – first place	1986 Madrid	High Jump
Gold medal – first place	1989 Haag	High Jump
Silver medal – second place	1988 Budapest	High Jump
Bronze medal – third place	1981 Grenoble	High Jump
Bronze medal – third place	1990 Glasgow	High Jump

Dietmar Mögenburg (German pronunciation: [ˈdiːtmaʁ ˈmøːɡn̩ˌbʊʁk], audio; born 15 August 1961) is a (West) German former high jumper who won gold medals at the 1984 Summer Olympics in Los Angeles and at the 1982 European Championships in Athens.

== Career ==
On 26 May 1980, at the age of 18, Mögenburg jumped 2.35 m which tied the world outdoor record set by Jacek Wszoła of Poland. At the time, this mark also established a new world outdoor junior record. He reached his outdoor peak on 10 June 1984 when he cleared 2.36 m in Eberstadt, in a competition won by Zhu Jianhua with a world record of 2.39 m. Mögenburg would later establish a new world indoor mark of 2.39 m on 14 February 1985 in Cologne. As of 2015, the only German to have jumped higher is his 1980s rival Carlo Thränhardt, who cleared 2.37 m outdoors (1984) and 2.42 m indoors (1988).

== International competitions ==
- 10-time West German High Jump Champion (1980–85, 1987–90)
- 5-time West German Indoor High Jump Champion (1979–81, 1984, 1989)

Year	Competition	Venue	Position	Notes
Representing West Germany
1980	European Indoor Championships	Sindelfingen, West Germany	1st	2.31 m
1980	Liberty Bell Classic	Philadelphia, United States	3rd	2.22 m
1981	European Indoor Championships	Grenoble, France	3rd	2.25 m
1982	European Indoor Championships	Milan, Italy	1st	2.34 m
1982	European Championships	Athens, Greece	1st	2.30 m
1983	World Championships	Helsinki, Finland	4th	2.29 m
1984	European Indoor Championships	Gothenburg, Sweden	1st	2.33 m
1984	Olympic Games	Los Angeles, United States	1st	2.35 m
1986	European Indoor Championships	Madrid, Spain	1st	2.34 m
1986	European Championships	Stuttgart, West Germany	4th	2.28 m
1987	World Championships	Rome, Italy	4th	2.35 m
1988	European Indoor Championships	Budapest, Hungary	2nd	2.37 m
1988	Olympic Games	Seoul, South Korea	6th	2.34 m
1989	European Indoor Championships	The Hague, Netherlands	1st	2.33 m
1989	World Indoor Championships	Budapest, Hungary	2nd	2.35 m
1990	European Indoor Championships	Glasgow, Scotland	3rd	2.30 m
1990	European Championships	Split, Yugoslavia	6th	2.31 m
Representing Germany
1992	Olympic Games	Barcelona, Spain	27th (q)	2.15 m

Note: Result with a q, indicates overall position in qualifying round.

Records
Preceded by (Poland) Jacek Wszoła	Men's High Jump World Record Holder equalled the 2.35 mark by Jacek Wszoła (POL); 1980-05-26 – 1980-08-01	Succeeded by (East Germany) Gerd Wessig
Sporting positions
Preceded by (Soviet Union) Vladimir Yashchenko	Men's High Jump Best Year Performance; 1979	Succeeded by (East Germany) Gerd Wessig
