= Gennadiy Belkov =

Uzbekistani high jumper

Gennady Belkov
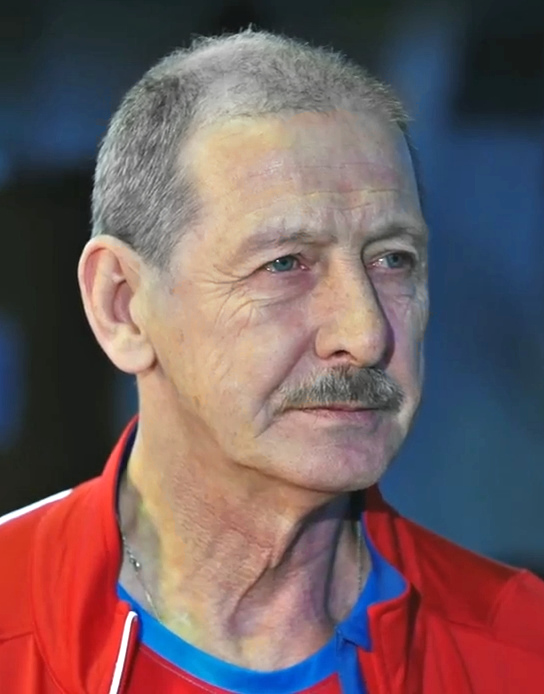
- Belkov in 2017

Personal information
- Nationality: Soviet Union, Uzbekistan
- Born: 24 June 1956 (age 70) Samara

Sport
- Sport: athletics
- Event: high jump
Medal record
Men's athletics
Representing Soviet Union
European Indoor Championships
Silver medal – second place	1979 Vienna	High jump

Gennadiy Belkov (born 24 June 1956) is a retired Uzbekistani high jumper who represented the Soviet Union.

He won the silver medal at the 1979 European Indoor Championships and finished eighteenth at the 1980 European Indoor Championships.

He competed in the men's high jump at the 1980 Summer Olympics.

His personal best jump was 2.32 metres, achieved 29 May 1982 in Tashkent.
