= Athletics at the 1984 Summer Olympics – Men's high jump =

Men's high jump at the Games of the XXIII Olympiad
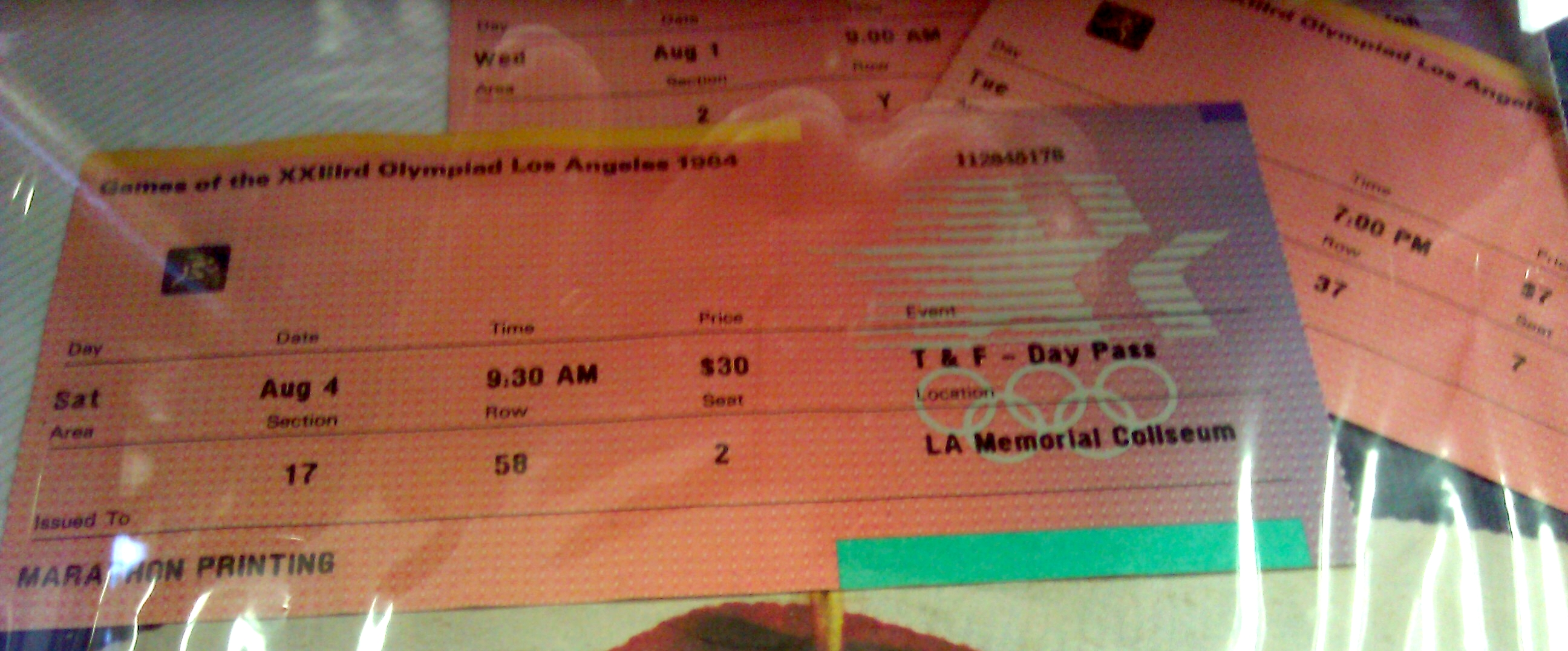
- Athletics tickets
- Venue: Los Angeles Memorial Coliseum
- Dates: 10–11 August
- Competitors: 30 from 20 nations
- Winning height: 2.35

Medalists
1st place, gold medalist(s)		Dietmar Mögenburg; West Germany
2nd place, silver medalist(s)		Patrik Sjöberg; Sweden
3rd place, bronze medalist(s)		Zhu Jianhua; China

The men's high jump event at the 1984 Summer Olympics in Los Angeles, California, was held at the Los Angeles Memorial Coliseum on 10–11 August 1984. Thirty athletes from 20 nations competed. The maximum number of athletes per nation had been set at 3 since the 1930 Olympic Congress. The event was won by Dietmar Mögenburg of West Germany, the nation's first victory in the men's high jump (mirroring East Germany's victory in 1980). Patrik Sjöberg's silver was Sweden's first medal in the event since 1920. Zhu Jianhua won bronze in the People's Republic of China's first appearance. The United States, which had made the podium in each of the 18 editions of the high jump before the 1980 boycott, now missed the podium for the first time in which the country competed, as Dwight Stones in fourth place fell just short of becoming the first man to earn three medals in the event.

== Background ==
This was the 20th appearance of the event, which is one of 12 athletics events to have been held at every Summer Olympics. The returning finalists from the 1980 Games were fifth-place finisher Roland Dalhäuser of Switzerland and ninth-place finisher Mark Naylor of Great Britain. Two-time bronze medalist (1972 and 1976) Dwight Stones of the United States, who had missed the Moscow Games due to the boycott, was back, however. Going into the competition, a clear favourite was China's Zhu Jianhua, who won bronze in the 1983 World Championships and who had set a new world record of 2.39 metres on 10 June 1984, less than two months before the Games in Los Angeles. Stones was also a contender, along with Dietmar Mögenburg of West Germany.

The People's Republic of China (as "China"), Hong Kong, and Zambia each made their debut in the event; the Republic of China appeared for the first time as "Chinese Taipei". The United States made its 19th appearance, most of any nation, having missed only the boycotted 1980 Games.

== Competition format ==
The competition used the two-round format introduced in 1912. There were two distinct rounds of jumping with results cleared between rounds. Jumpers were eliminated if they had three consecutive failures, whether at a single height or between multiple heights if they attempted to advance before clearing a height.

The qualifying round had the bar set at 2.05 metres, 2.10 metres, 2.15 metres, 2.18 metres, 2.21 metres, and 2.24 metres. All jumpers clearing 2.24 metres in the qualifying round advanced to the final. If fewer than 12 jumpers could achieve it, the top 12 (including ties) would advance to the final.

The final had jumps at 2.15 metres, 2.18 metres, 2.21 metres, 2.24 metres, 2.27 metres, 2.29 metres, 2.31 metres, 2.33 metres, 2.35 metres, and 2.40 metres.

== Records ==
Prior to the competition, the existing world and Olympic records were as follows.

World record	Zhu Jianhua (CHN)	2.39	Eberstadt, West Germany	10 June 1984
Olympic record	Gerd Wessig (GDR)	2.36	Moscow, Soviet Union	1 August 1980

No new world or Olympic records were set during the competition.

== Schedule ==
All times are Pacific Daylight Time (UTC-7)

Date	Time	Round
Friday, 10 August 1984	9:30	Qualifying
Saturday, 11 August 1984	16:30	Final

== Results ==
Key

- o = Height cleared
- x = Height failed
- – = Height passed
- r = Retired
- SB = Season's best
- PB = Personal best
- NR = National record
- AR = Area record
- OR = Olympic record
- WR = World record
- WL = World lead
- NM = No mark
- DNS = Did not start
- DQ = Disqualified

=== Qualifying round ===
Qualification rule: qualifying performance 2.24 m (Q) or twelve best performers (q) advance to the final.

Rank	Group	Athlete	Nation	2.05	2.10	2.15	2.18	2.21	2.24	Height	Notes
1	A	Milton Goode	United States	—	—	—	o	o	o	2.24	Q
1	A	Patrik Sjöberg	Sweden	—	—	o	o	o	o	2.24	Q
1	A	Zhu Jianhua	China	—	o	—	o	o	o	2.24	Q
1	B	Liu Yunpeng	China	—	o	o	—	o	o	2.24	Q
1	A	Doug Nordquist	United States	—	—	o	o	o	o	2.24	Q
1	A	Milton Ottey	Canada	—	o	o	o	o	o	2.24	Q
1	A	Dietmar Mögenburg	West Germany	—	—	o	—	o	o	2.24	Q
8	A	Dwight Stones	United States	—	—	o	o	xo	o	2.24	Q
9	B	Cai Shu	China	—	o	o	—	o	xo	2.24	Q
9	A	Erkki Niemi	Finland	—	o	o	o	o	xo	2.24	Q
11	A	Roland Dalhäuser	Switzerland	—	—	—	—	xxo	xo	2.24	Q
12	A	Carlo Thränhardt	West Germany	o	—	x–	—	o	xxo	2.24	Q
13	B	John Atkinson	Australia	o	o	o	xo	o	xxx	2.21	
13	B	Thomas Eriksson	Sweden	—	o	o	xo	o	xxx	2.21	
15	A	Eddy Annys	Belgium	—	—	o	—	xo	xxx	2.21	
15	B	Geoff Parsons	Great Britain	—	—	o	—	xo	xxx	2.21	
15	A	Takao Sakamoto	Japan	–	o	o	o	xo	xxx	2.21	
18	A	Gerd Nagel	West Germany	o	xo	o	o	xxx	—	2.18	
19	B	Hrvoje Fižuleto	Yugoslavia	o	xxo	xo	o	xxx	—	2.18	
20	B	Alain Metellus	Canada	—	o	o	xo	xxx	—	2.18	
21	B	Nick Saunders	Bermuda	—	o	o	xxo	xxx	—	2.18	
22	B	Novica Čanović	Yugoslavia	—	—	o	—	xxx	—	2.15	
22	B	Dimitrios Kattis	Greece	—	—	o	xxx	—		2.15	
24	A	Franck Verzy	France	—	o	xo	—	xxx	—	2.15	
25	B	Desmond Morris	Jamaica	—	xo	xo	xxx	—		2.15	
26	B	Liu Chin-chiang	Chinese Taipei	o	xo	xxx	—			2.10	
26	B	Lam Tin Sau	Hong Kong	o	xo	xxx	—			2.10	
28	B	Mutale Mulenga	Zambia	xo	xxx	—				2.05	NR
—	A	Stephen Wray	Bahamas	—	—	xxx	—			No mark	
—	B	Mark Naylor	Great Britain	—	xxx	—				No mark	

=== Final ===
Rank	Athlete	Nation	2.15	2.18	2.21	2.24	2.27	2.29	2.31	2.33	2.35	2.40	Height
1st place, gold medalist(s)	Dietmar Mögenburg	West Germany	o	—	o	—	o	—	o	o	o	xxx	2.35
2nd place, silver medalist(s)	Patrik Sjöberg	Sweden	—	—	o	—	xo	o	xo	xo	xxx	—	2.33
3rd place, bronze medalist(s)	Zhu Jianhua	China	o	—	o	—	o	—	o	x–	xx	—	2.31
4	Dwight Stones	United States	—	o	—	o	—	x–	o	xxx	—		2.31
5	Doug Nordquist	United States	—	o	—	o	o	o	xxx	—			2.29
6	Milton Ottey	Canada	o	—	o	xo	xo	o	xxx	—			2.29
7	Liu Yunpeng	China	o	—	o	o	xxo	xo	xxx	—			2.29
8	Cai Shu	China	o	—	xo	o	xo	x–	xx	—			2.27
9	Erkki Niemi	Finland	o	—	xo	xxo	xxx	—					2.24
10	Carlo Thränhardt	West Germany	xo	—	xx–	—							2.15
—	Roland Dalhäuser	Switzerland	—	—	xxx	—							No mark
—	Milton Goode	United States	—	—	xxx	—							No mark

== See also ==
- Athletics at the Friendship Games – Men's high jump
