= Francis Agbo =

French high jumper (1958–2023)

Francis Agbo (15 January 1958 – 11 November 2023) was a French athlete who specialised in the high jump. Agbo competed at the 1980 Summer Olympics. He was born in Adjohoun, French Dahomey (now Benin) on 15 January 1958, and died on 11 November 2023, at the age of 65.
