= Vaso Komnenić =

Vaso Komnenić (Serbian Cyrillic: Васо Комненић, born 15 May 1955 in Kosovska Mitrovica), is a retired Serbian and Yugoslav high jumper.

He represented Yugoslavia at the 1980 Summer Olympics and won 6th place in high jump. He was a member of Red Start athletics club.
