= Martí Perarnau =

Spanish sports journalist and former athlete

Personal information
- Born: 7 March 1955 (age 71) Barcelona, Spain

Sport
- Sport: Track and field

Martí Perarnau Grau (born 7 March 1955) is a Catalan sports journalist and former athlete.

== Biography ==
He was born in Barcelona and in his youth he practiced athletics at the wish of his father, who was a university champion in the 400 meter hurdles. At one time, he held the Spanish national record in his discipline. When he was 19, he combined his career with his first job as a journalist at the Diario de Barcelona, and in 1976 he retired from competition to assume the sports leadership of the Mundio Diario for four years. He returned to elite spots after the disappearance of that newspaper, in time to win a place in the 1980 Summer Olympics. Already in the Soviet capital he fell into the elimination phase.

=== Journalism ===
He returned to journalism in 1982 on the staff of the El Correo Catalan and after two years, failing to reach the minimum requirements to compete in the 1984 Summer Olympics, he retired to direct the sports newsroom at TVE Cataluña. Under his mandate he created the program Estadio 2 and covered different national and international events. He left public television in November 1987 to assume the sports leadership role at Radio Barcelona, belonging to Cadena SER.

In 1988 he was named director of the press center for the 1992 Summer Olympics, within the Organizing Olympic Committee. When the games ended, Antena 3 Televisión signed him to work in their communication and advertising department, in full corporate renewal undertaken by Grupo Zeta, and he remained there until 1995. Since then he has managed his own advertising production company, along with collaborating as a sports analyst in different media and he has created the publication Perarnau Magazine.

=== Book writing ===
In April 2011 he published the book Path of Champions, in which he explains the history and function of the lower categories within FC Barcelona. His second book Herr Pep went on sale in September 2014 and reflects the work of Pep Guardiola, then the manager at Bayern Munich and former manager at Barcelona, during his first season as the manager of the German club. Perarnau followed the Catalan coach during the entirety of the season to be able to write the book. In November 2021 he published his latest book, The Tactical Evolution of Football 1863–1945; deciphering the genetic code of football from the hand of the false 9, in which he analyzes historical tactics of that period and the variant of the striker known as the "False Nine".
