= Marco Tamberi =

Italian high jumper

Personal information
- Nationality: Italian
- Born: July 30, 1958 (age 67) Ancona, Italy
- Height: 1.87 m (6 ft 1 1/2 in)
- Weight: 78 kg (172 lb)

Sport
- Country: Italy
- Sport: Athletics
- Event: High jump
- Club: Pro Patria Milano

Achievements and titles
- Personal best: High jump: 2.28 m (1983)

Marco Tamberi (born 30 July 1958 in Ancona) is a retired Italian high jumper and former coach of his son, the Olympic champion Gianmarco Tamberi.

== Biography ==
His personal best jump is 2.27 metres, achieved in June 1983 in Udine. He had 2.28 metres on the indoor track, achieved in February 1983 in Genoa. Until 2022 Tamberi was the coach of his son, Olympic and world champion Gianmarco Tamberi. He has 11 caps in national team from 1980 to 1984.

== National records ==
- High jump: 2.28 m ( (Italy) Genoa, 2 February 1983)

== Achievements ==
Year	Competition	Venue	Position	Event	Measure	Notes
1980	European Indoor Championships	(West Germany) Sindelfingen	5th	High jump	2.26 m	
1980	Olympic Games	(Soviet Union) Moscow	15th	High jump	2.18 m	
1983	European Indoor Championships	(Hungary) Budapest	11th	High jump	2.20 m	

== National titles ==
He has won one time the individual national championship.

- 1 win in high jump indoor (1980)

== See also ==
- Gianmarco Tamberi
