= Valeriy Sereda =

Soviet Azerbaijani high jumper

Valeriy Sereda (born 30 June 1959) is a retired high jumper who represented the Soviet Union and later Azerbaijan. His personal best jump is 2.37 metres, achieved in September 1984 in Rieti, Italy. This is the current Azerbaijani record.

== Achievements ==
Year	Competition	Venue	Position	Event	Notes
Representing Soviet Union
1982	European Championships	Athens, Greece	5th	High jump	
1983	World Championships	Helsinki, Finland	8th	High jump	
1984	Friendship Games	Moscow, Soviet Union	1st	High jump	2.25 m
1985	World Indoor Games	Paris, France	4th	High jump	
